= Fangoria Chainsaw Award for Best Limited Release =

Fangoria Chainsaw Award

- Country: USA
- Presented by: Fangoria
- First award: 1992
- Currently held by: Dust Bunny (2026)

Highlights
- Most wins: Don Coscarelli (2)
- Most nominations: Brian Yuzna (5)

Fangoria Chainsaw Award for Best Limited Release is an award presented by Fangoria as part of the Fangoria Chainsaw Awards.

== Winners and nominees ==
In the list below, winners are listed first in the gold row, followed by the other nominees.

=== 1990s ===
Year	Film	Director	Ref
1992 (1st)	Bride of Re-Animator	Brian Yuzna	
1992 (1st)	Maniac Cop 2	William Lustig	
1992 (1st)	The Pit and the Pendulum	Stuart Gordon	
1992 (1st)	The Unborn	Rodman Flender	
1992 (1st)	Warlock	Steve Miner	
1993 (2nd)	The Resurrected	Dan O'Bannon	
1993 (2nd)	Basket Case 3	Frank Henenlotter	
1993 (2nd)	Highway to Hell	Ate de Jong	
1993 (2nd)	The Refrigerator	Nicholas Jacobs	
1993 (2nd)	Scanners III	Christian Duguay	
1994 (3rd)	Dead Alive	Peter Jackson	
1994 (3rd)	Ticks	Tony Randel	
1994 (3rd)	Dust Devil	Richard Stanley	
1994 (3rd)	Freaked	Tom Stern and Alex Winter	
1994 (3rd)	Return of the Living Dead 3	Brian Yuzna	
1995 (4th)	Phantasm III: Lord of the Dead	Don Coscarelli	
1995 (4th)	Body Snatchers	Abel Ferrara	
1995 (4th)	Cronos	Guillermo del Toro	
1995 (4th)	Jack Be Nimble	Garth Maxwell	
1995 (4th)	Trauma	Dario Argento	
1996 (5th)	Castle Freak	Stuart Gordon	
1997 (6th)	Cemetery Man	Michele Soavi	
1997 (6th)	Tremors 2: Aftershocks	S. S. Wilson	
1997 (6th)	The Cold Light of Day	Rudolf van den Berg	
1997 (6th)	The Dentist	Brian Yuzna	
1997 (6th)	Necronomicon	Brian Yuzna, Christophe Gans, and Shusuke Kaneko	
1998 (7th)	Lost Highway	David Lynch	
1998 (7th)	Crash	David Cronenberg	
1999 (8th)	The Night Flier	Mark Pavia	
1999 (8th)	Cube	Vincenzo Natali	
1999 (8th)	Funny Games	Michael Haneke	
1999 (8th)	Shadow Builder	Jamie Dixon	
1999 (8th)	The Ugly	Scott Reynolds	

=== 2000s ===
Year	Film	Director	Ref
2000 (9th)	The Day of the Beast	Álex de la Iglesia	
2000 (9th)	Open Your Eyes	Alejandro Amenábar	
2000 (9th)	Perfect Blue	Satoshi Kon	
2000 (9th)	The Eternal	Michael Almereyda	
2000 (9th)	The Stendhal Syndrome	Dario Argento	
2001 (10th)	Cherry Falls	Geoffrey Wright	
2001 (10th)	Lighthouse	Simon Hunter	
2001 (10th)	Requiem for a Dream	Darren Aronofsky	
2001 (10th)	The Phantom Lover	Ronny Yu	
2001 (10th)	The Wisdom of Crocodiles	Po-Chih Leong	
2002 (11th)	Ginger Snaps	John Fawcett	
2002 (11th)	Audition	Takashi Miike	
2002 (11th)	Session 9	Brad Anderson	
2002 (11th)	The Convent	Mike Mendez	
2002 (11th)	The Devil's Backbone	Guillermo del Toro	
2003 (12th)	Dog Soldiers	Neil Marshall	
2003 (12th)	Dagon	Stuart Gordon	
2003 (12th)	Wendigo	Larry Fessenden	
2003 (12th)	She Creature	Sebastian Gutierrez	
2003 (12th)	Wolf Girl	Thom Fitzgerald	
2004 (13th)	Bubba Ho-Tep	Don Coscarelli	
2004 (13th)	Beyond Re-Animator	Brian Yuzna	
2004 (13th)	May	Lucky McKee	
2004 (13th)	Nightstalker	Chris Fisher	
2004 (13th)	Spider	David Cronenberg	
2005 (14th)	Ginger Snaps 2: Unleashed	Brett Sullivan	
2005 (14th)	Dead End	Jean-Baptiste Andrea and Fabrice Canepa	
2005 (14th)	Lucky	Steve Cuden	
2005 (14th)	My Little Eye	Marc Evans	
2005 (14th)	The Machinist	Brad Anderson	
2006 (15th)	Toolbox Murders	Tobe Hooper	
2006 (15th)	Dead Birds	Alex Turner	
2006 (15th)	Satan's Little Helper	Jeff Lieberman	
2006 (15th)	Shallow Ground	Sheldon Wilson	
2006 (15th)	The Nameless	Jaume Balagueró	
~~2007~~	Cancelled		
~~2008~~	Cancelled		
2009 (16th)	Let the Right One In	Tomas Alfredson	
2009 (16th)	Jack Brooks: Monster Slayer	Jon Knautz	
2009 (16th)	Rogue	Greg McLean	
2009 (16th)	Stuck	Stuart Gordon	
2009 (16th)	The Living and the Dead	Simon Rumley	

=== 2010s ===
Year	Film	Director	Ref
2010 (17th)	Trick 'r Treat	Michael Dougherty	
2010 (17th)	Deadgirl	Marcel Sarmiento and Gadi Harel	
2010 (17th)	Martyrs	Pascal Laugier	
2010 (17th)	Rec	Jaume Balagueró and Paco Plaza	
2010 (17th)	The Burrowers	J. T. Petty	
2010 (17th)	The Children	Tom Shankland	
2011 (18th)	The Human Centipede (First Sequence)	Tom Six	
2011 (18th)	Antichrist	Lars von Trier	
2011 (18th)	Buried	Rodrigo Cortés	
2011 (18th)	Monsters	Gareth Edwards	
2011 (18th)	Rec 2	Jaume Balagueró and Paco Plaza	
2012 (19th)	Tucker & Dale vs. Evil	Eli Craig	
2012 (19th)	Attack the Block	Joe Cornish	
2012 (19th)	Black Death	Christopher Smith	
2012 (19th)	Red White & Blue	Simon Rumley	
2012 (19th)	Stake Land	Jim Mickle	
2012 (19th)	The Human Centipede 2 (Full Sequence)	Tom Six	
2013 (20th)	Absentia	Mike Flanagan	
2013 (20th)	A Lonely Place to Die	Julian Gilbey	
2013 (20th)	Compliance	Craig Zobel	
2013 (20th)	Kill List	Ben Wheatley	
2013 (20th)	The Revenant	Kerry Prior	
2014 (21st)	V/H/S/2	Simon Barrett, Adam Wingard, Eduardo Sánchez, Gregg Hale, Timo Tjahjanto, Gareth Huw Evans and Jason Eisener	
2014 (21st)	Berberian Sound Studio	Peter Strickland	
2014 (21st)	Byzantium	Neil Jordan	
2014 (21st)	Stoker	Park Chan-wook	
2014 (21st)	We Are What We Are	Jim Mickle	
2015 (22nd)	The Babadook	Jennifer Kent	
2015 (22nd)	Housebound	Gerard Johnstone	
2015 (22nd)	The Battery	Jeremy Gardner	
2015 (22nd)	The Sacrament	Ti West	
2015 (22nd)	Under the Skin	Jonathan Glazer	
2016 (23rd)	What We Do in the Shadows	Jemaine Clement and Taika Waititi	
2016 (23rd)	Anguish	Sonny Mallhi	
2016 (23rd)	Some Kind of Hate	Adam Egypt Mortimer	
2016 (23rd)	The Final Girls	Todd Strauss-Schulson	
2016 (23rd)	We Are Still Here	Ted Geoghegan	
2017 (24th)	The Autopsy of Jane Doe	André Øvredal	
2017 (24th)	The Eyes of My Mother	Nicolas Pesce	
2017 (24th)	Hush	Mike Flanagan	
2017 (24th)	I Am Not a Serial Killer	Billy O'Brien	
2017 (24th)	The Invitation	Karyn Kusama	
~~2018~~	Cancelled		
2019 (25th)	Mandy	Panos Cosmatos	
2019 (25th)	Anna and the Apocalypse	John McPhail	
2019 (25th)	Revenge	Coralie Fargeat	
2019 (25th)	Suspiria	Luca Guadagnino	
2019 (25th)	Terrifier	Damien Leone	

=== 2020s ===
Year	Film	Director	Ref
2020 (26th)	The Lighthouse	Robert Eggers	
2020 (26th)	Bliss	Joe Begos	
2020 (26th)	Daniel Isn't Real	Adam Egypt Mortimer	
2020 (26th)	In Fabric	Peter Strickland	
2020 (26th)	Nightmare Cinema	Alejandro Brugués, Joe Dante, Mick Garris, Ryūhei Kitamura and David Slade	
2020 (26th)	Satanic Panic	Chelsea Stardust	
2021 (27th)	Color Out of Space	Richard Stanley	
2021 (27th)	The Dark and the Wicked	Bryan Bertino	
2021 (27th)	Possessor	Brandon Cronenberg	
2021 (27th)	Relic	Natalie Erika James	
2021 (27th)	The Wolf of Snow Hollow	Jim Cummings	
2022 (28th)	PG: Psycho Goreman	Steven Kostanski	
2022 (28th)	Come True	Anthony Scott Burns	
2022 (28th)	Hurt	Sonny Mallhi	
2022 (28th)	In the Earth	Ben Wheatley	
2022 (28th)	Werewolves Within	Josh Ruben	
2023 (29th)	Terrifier 2	Damien Leone	
2023 (29th)	Orphan: First Kill	William Brent Bell	
2023 (29th)	Resurrection	Andrew Semans	
2023 (29th)	Something in the Dirt	Justin Benson and Aaron Moorhead	
2023 (29th)	Mad God	Phil Tippett	
2024 (30th)	I Saw the TV Glow	Jane Schoenbrun	
2024 (30th)	Cobweb	Samuel Bodin	
2024 (30th)	Enys Men	Mark Jenkin	
2024 (30th)	The Outwaters	Robbie Banfitch	
2024 (30th)	Suitable Flesh	Joe Lynch	
2025 (31st)	Azrael	E. L. Katz	
2025 (31st)	Frankie Freako	Steven Kostanski	
2025 (31st)	Freaky Tales	Anna Boden and Ryan Fleck	
2025 (31st)	Get Away	Steffen Haars	
2025 (31st)	Little Bites	Spider One	
2026 (32nd)	Dust Bunny	Bryan Fuller	
2026 (32nd)	Mārama	Taratoa Stappard	
2026 (32nd)	Queens of the Dead	Tina Romero	
2026 (32nd)	The Serpent's Skin	Alice Maio Mackay	
2026 (32nd)	Touch Me	Addison Heimann	
