= Fangoria Chainsaw Award for Best Screenplay =

Fangoria Chainsaw Award

- Country: USA
- Presented by: Fangoria
- First award: 1992
- Currently held by: Obsession (2026)

Highlights
- Most wins: Ari Aster and Kevin Williamson (2)
- Most nominations: Guillermo del Toro (4)

Fangoria Chainsaw Award for Best Screenplay is an award presented by Fangoria as part of the Fangoria Chainsaw Awards.

== Winners and nominees ==
In the list below, winners are listed first in the gold row, followed by the other nominees.

=== 1990s ===
Year	Film	Writer(s)	Ref
1992 (1st)	The Silence of the Lambs	Ted Tally	
1992 (1st)	Maniac Cop 2	Larry Cohen	
1992 (1st)	The People Under the Stairs	Wes Craven	
1992 (1st)	Terminator 2: Judgment Day	James Cameron and William Wisher	
1992 (1st)	Warlock	David Twohy	
1993 (2nd)	Bram Stoker's Dracula	James V. Hart	
1993 (2nd)	Hellraiser III: Hell on Earth	Peter Atkins	
1993 (2nd)	Naked Lunch	David Cronenberg	
1993 (2nd)	The Resurrected	Brent V. Friedman	
1993 (2nd)	Candyman	Bernard Rose	
1994 (3rd)	The Dark Half	George A. Romero	
1994 (3rd)	Freaked	Tom Stern, Alex Winter, and Tim Burns	
1994 (3rd)	The Ambulance	Larry Cohen	
1994 (3rd)	Jason Goes to Hell: The Final Friday	Dean Lorey and Jay Huguely	
1994 (3rd)	Dead Alive	Stephen Sinclair, Frances Walsh and Peter Jackson	
1995 (4th)	Wes Craven's New Nightmare	Wes Craven	
1995 (4th)	Cronos	Guillermo del Toro	
1995 (4th)	Interview with the Vampire	Anne Rice	
1995 (4th)	Jack Be Nimble	Garth Maxwell	
1995 (4th)	Mary Shelley's Frankenstein	Steph Lady and Frank Darabont	
1996 (5th)	Seven	Andrew Kevin Walker	
1997 (6th)	Scream	Kevin Williamson	
1997 (6th)	From Dusk till Dawn	Quentin Tarantino	
1997 (6th)	Cemetery Man	Gianni Romali	
1997 (6th)	The Frighteners	Peter Jackson and Fran Walsh	
1997 (6th)	The Craft	Peter Filardi and Andrew Fleming	
1998 (7th)	Scream 2	Kevin Williamson	
1998 (7th)	Lost Highway	David Lynch and Barry Gifford	
1999 (8th)	Dark City	David S. Goyer, Lem Dobbs and Alex Proyas	
1999 (8th)	Apt Pupil	Brandon Boyce	
1999 (8th)	Bride of Chucky	Don Mancini	
1999 (8th)	Funny Games	Michael Haneke	
1999 (8th)	Vampires	Don Jakoby	

=== 2000s ===
Year	Film	Writer(s)	Ref
2000 (9th)	The Sixth Sense	M. Night Shyamalan	
2000 (9th)	Existenz	David Cronenberg	
2000 (9th)	Open Your Eyes	Alejandro Amenábar and Mateo Gil	
2000 (9th)	Stir of Echoes	David Koepp	
2000 (9th)	The Day of the Beast	Jorge Guerricaechevarría and Álex de la Iglesia	
2001 (10th)	Shadow of the Vampire	Steven A. Katz	
2001 (10th)	American Psycho	Mary Harron and Guinevere Turner	
2001 (10th)	Pitch Black	Ken and Jim Wheat and David Twohy	
2001 (10th)	Requiem for a Dream	Darren Aronofsky and Hubert Selby Jr.	
2001 (10th)	The Cell	Mark Protosevich	
2002 (11th)	Ginger Snaps	Karen Walton	
2002 (11th)	Hannibal	Steven Zaillian and David Mamet	
2002 (11th)	Audition	Daisuke Tengan	
2002 (11th)	The Convent	Chaton Anderson	
2002 (11th)	The Devil's Backbone	Guillermo del Toro, Antonio Trashorras and David Muñoz	
2003 (12th)	Frailty	Brent Hanley	
2003 (12th)	Blade II	David S. Goyer	
2003 (12th)	Dagon	Dennis Paoli	
2003 (12th)	Wendigo	Larry Fessenden	
2003 (12th)	Wolf Girl	Lori Lansens	
2004 (13th)	28 Days Later	Alex Garland	
2004 (13th)	Bubba Ho-Tep	Don Coscarelli	
2004 (13th)	Cabin Fever	Eli Roth and Randy Pearlstein	
2004 (13th)	May	Lucky McKee	
2004 (13th)	Spider	Patrick McGrath	
2005 (14th)	Shaun of the Dead	Simon Pegg and Edgar Wright	
2005 (14th)	Ginger Snaps 2: Unleashed	Megan Martin	
2005 (14th)	Hellboy	Guillermo del Toro	
2005 (14th)	My Little Eye	David Hilton and James Watkins	
2005 (14th)	The Machinist	Scott Kosar	
2006 (15th)	The Devil's Rejects	Rob Zombie	
2006 (15th)	Dark Water	Rafael Yglesias	
2006 (15th)	Land of the Dead	George A. Romero	
2006 (15th)	Satan's Little Helper	Jeff Lieberman	
2006 (15th)	Wolf Creek	Greg McLean	
~~2007~~	Cancelled		
~~2008~~	Cancelled		
2009 (16th)	Let the Right One In	John Ajvide Lindqvist	
2009 (16th)	Hellboy II: The Golden Army	Guillermo del Toro	
2009 (16th)	Jack Brooks: Monster Slayer	John Ainslie and Jon Knautz	
2009 (16th)	Stuck	John Strysik	
2009 (16th)	Teeth	Mitchell Lichtenstein	

=== 2010s ===
Year	Film	Writer(s)	Ref
2010 (17th)	Martyrs	Pascal Laugier	
2010 (17th)	Deadgirl	Trent Haaga	
2010 (17th)	From Within	Brad Keene	
2010 (17th)	Surveillance	Jennifer Lynch and Kent Harper	
2010 (17th)	The Burrowers	J. T. Petty	
2010 (17th)	The Children	Tom Shankland and Paul Andrew Williams	
2011 (18th)	Black Swan	Andres Heinz, Mark Heyman and John J. McLaughlin	
2011 (18th)	Buried	Chris Sparling	
2011 (18th)	I Sell the Dead	Glenn McQuaid	
2011 (18th)	Rec 2	Jaume Balagueró, Manu Díaz and Paco Plaza	
2011 (18th)	Triangle	Christopher Smith	
2012 (19th)	Tucker & Dale vs. Evil	Eli Craig and Morgan Jurgenson	
2012 (19th)	Attack the Block	Joe Cornish	
2012 (19th)	Black Death	Dario Poloni	
2012 (19th)	Red White & Blue	Simon Rumley	
2012 (19th)	Stake Land	Nick Damici and Jim Mickle	
2012 (19th)	The Skin I Live In	Pedro Almodóvar and Agustín Almodóvar	
2013 (20th)	The Cabin in the Woods	Joss Whedon and Drew Goddard	
2013 (20th)	Kill List	Ben Wheatley and Amy Jump	
2013 (20th)	Rabies	Aharon Keshales and Navot Papushado	
2013 (20th)	The Revenant	D. Kerry Prior	
2013 (20th)	The Tall Man	Pascal Laugier	
2014 (21st)	You're Next	Simon Barrett	
2014 (21st)	Grabbers	Kevin Lehane	
2014 (21st)	Haunter	Brian King	
2014 (21st)	Stoker	Wentworth Miller	
2014 (21st)	We Are What We Are	Nick Damici and Jim Mickle	
2015 (22nd)	The Babadook	Jennifer Kent	
2015 (22nd)	Housebound	Gerard Johnstone	
2015 (22nd)	Life After Beth	Jeff Baena	
2015 (22nd)	Oculus	Mike Flanagan and Jeff Howard	
2015 (22nd)	Proxy	Zack Parker and Kevin Donner	
2016 (23rd)	What We Do in the Shadows	Jemaine Clement and Taika Waititi	
2016 (23rd)	Anguish	Sonny Mallhi	
2016 (23rd)	The Final Girls	M. A. Fortin and Joshua John Miller	
2016 (23rd)	The Gift	Joel Edgerton	
2016 (23rd)	The Midnight Swim	Sarah Adina Smith	
2017 (24th)	The Invitation	Matt Manfredi and Phil Hay	
2017 (24th)	Pet	Jeremy Slater	
2017 (24th)	Last Girl Standing	Benjamin R. Moody	
2017 (24th)	The Similars	Isaac Ezban	
2017 (24th)	Trash Fire	Richard Bates Jr.	
~~2018~~	Cancelled		
2019 (25th)	Hereditary	Ari Aster	
2019 (25th)	Cam	Isa Mazzei	
2019 (25th)	The Cleanse	Bobby Miller	
2019 (25th)	The Cured	David Freyne	
2019 (25th)	A Quiet Place	Scott Beck, Bryan Woods and John Krasinski	

=== 2020s ===
Year	Film	Writer(s)	Ref
2020 (26th)	Midsommar	Ari Aster	
2020 (26th)	Ready or Not	Guy Busick and Ryan Murphy	
2020 (26th)	Doctor Sleep	Mike Flanagan	
2020 (26th)	Satanic Panic	Grady Hendrix	
2020 (26th)	Us	Jordan Peele	
2020 (26th)	One Cut of the Dead	Shin'ichirô Ueda	
2021 (27th)	The Invisible Man	Leigh Whannell	
2021 (27th)	Bacurau	Kleber Mendonça Filho and Juliano Dornelles	
2021 (27th)	Come to Daddy	Toby Harvard	
2021 (27th)	Freaky	Michael Kennedy and Christopher Landon	
2021 (27th)	His House	Remi Weekes	
2022 (28th)	The Night House	Ben Collins and Luke Piotrowski	
2022 (28th)	Censor	Prano Bailey-Bond and Anthony Fletcher	
2022 (28th)	Detention	John Hsu, Fu Kai-ling, and Chien Shih-keng	
2022 (28th)	Saint Maud	Rose Glass	
2022 (28th)	Violation	Madeleine Sims-Fewer and Dusty Mancinelli	
2023 (29th)	The Black Phone	C. Robert Cargill and Scott Derrickson	
2023 (29th)	Barbarian	Zach Cregger	
2023 (29th)	The Menu	Seth Reiss and Will Tracy	
2023 (29th)	Nope	Jordan Peele	
2023 (29th)	Pearl	Mia Goth and Ti West	
2024 (30th)	Late Night with the Devil	Colin and Cameron Cairnes	
2024 (30th)	The First Omen	Arkasha Stevenson, Tim Smith and Keith Thomas	
2024 (30th)	Infinity Pool	Brandon Cronenberg	
2024 (30th)	M3GAN	Akela Cooper and James Wan	
2024 (30th)	Talk to Me	Danny and Michael Philippou	
2025 (31st)	Sinners	Ryan Coogler	
2025 (31st)	Bring Her Back	Bill Hinzman and Danny Philippou	
2025 (31st)	Heretic	Scott Beck and Bryan Woods	
2025 (31st)	Strange Darling	JT Mollner	
2025 (31st)	The Substance	Coralie Fargeat	
2026 (32nd)	Obsession	Curry Barker	
2026 (32nd)	28 Years Later: The Bone Temple	Alex Garland	
2026 (32nd)	Faces of Death	Isa Mazzei and Daniel Goldhaber	
2026 (32nd)	Hokum	Damian McCarthy	
2026 (32nd)	Weapons	Zach Cregger	
