= Fangoria Chainsaw Award for Best Wide Release =

Fangoria Chainsaw Award

- Country: USA
- Presented by: Fangoria
- First award: 1992
- Currently held by: Obsession (2026)

Highlights
- Most wins: James Wan (3)
- Most nominations: James Wan (5)

The Fangoria Chainsaw Award for Best Wide Release has been awarded since 1992.

== Winners and nominees ==
In the list below, winners are listed first in the gold row, followed by the other nominees.

=== 1990s ===
Year	Film	Director	Ref
1992 (1st)	The Silence of the Lambs	Jonathan Demme	
1992 (1st)	Freddy's Dead: The Final Nightmare	Rachel Talalay	
1992 (1st)	The People Under the Stairs	Wes Craven	
1992 (1st)	Terminator 2: Judgment Day	James Cameron	
1992 (1st)	The Addams Family	Barry Sonnenfield	
1993 (2nd)	Bram Stoker's Dracula	Francis Ford Coppola	
1993 (2nd)	Alien 3	David Fincher	
1993 (2nd)	Candyman	Bernard Rose	
1993 (2nd)	Hellraiser III: Hell on Earth	Anthony Hickox	
1993 (2nd)	Innocent Blood	John Landis	
1994 (3rd)	Army of Darkness	Sam Raimi	
1994 (3rd)	The Nightmare Before Christmas	Tim Burton	
1994 (3rd)	Jason Goes to Hell: The Final Friday	Adam Marcus	
1994 (3rd)	The Dark Half	George A. Romero	
1994 (3rd)	Jurassic Park	Steven Spielberg	
1995 (4th)	The Crow	Alex Proyas	
1995 (4th)	Wes Craven's New Nightmare	Wes Craven	
1995 (4th)	Mary Shelley's Frankenstein	Kenneth Branagh	
1995 (4th)	Interview with the Vampire	Neil Jordan	
1995 (4th)	Wolf	Mike Nichols	
1996 (5th)	Seven	Alex Proyas	
1997 (6th)	Scream	Wes Craven	
1997 (6th)	From Dusk till Dawn	Robert Rodriguez	
1997 (6th)	The Frighteners	Peter Jackson	
1997 (6th)	The Craft	Andrew Fleming	
1998 (7th)	Scream 2	Wes Craven	
1998 (7th)	Alien Resurrection	Jean-Pierre Jeunet	
1998 (7th)	The Devil's Advocate	Taylor Hackford	
1999 (8th)	Dark City	Alex Proyas	
1999 (8th)	Apt Pupil	Bryan Singer	
1999 (8th)	Bride of Chucky	Ronny Yu	
1999 (8th)	Halloween H20: 20 Years Later	Steve Miner	
1999 (8th)	Vampires	John Carpenter	

=== 2000s ===
Year	Film	Director	Ref
2000 (9th)	The Sixth Sense	M. Night Shyamalan	
2000 (9th)	Existenz	David Cronenberg	
2000 (9th)	Sleepy Hollow	Tim Burton	
2000 (9th)	Stir of Echoes	David Koepp	
2000 (9th)	The Blair Witch Project	Daniel Myrick and Eduardo Sánchez	
2001 (10th)	American Psycho	Mary Harron	
2001 (10th)	Final Destination	James Wong	
2001 (10th)	Pitch Black	David Twohy	
2001 (10th)	Shadow of the Vampire	E. Elias Merhige	
2001 (10th)	The Cell	Tarsem Singh	
2002 (11th)	Jeepers Creepers	Victor Salva	
2002 (11th)	From Hell	Hughes brothers	
2002 (11th)	Hannibal	Ridley Scott	
2002 (11th)	Joy Ride	John Dahl	
2002 (11th)	The Others	Alejandro Amenábar	
2003 (12th)	The Ring	Gore Verbinski	
2003 (12th)	Blade II	Guillermo del Toro	
2003 (12th)	Brotherhood of the Wolf	Christophe Gans	
2003 (12th)	Frailty	Bill Paxton	
2003 (12th)	Signs	M. Night Shyamalan	
2004 (13th)	28 Days Later	Danny Boyle	
2004 (13th)	Cabin Fever	Eli Roth	
2004 (13th)	House of 1000 Corpses	Rob Zombie	
2004 (13th)	The Texas Chainsaw Massacre	Marcus Nispel	
2004 (13th)	Wrong Turn	Rob Schmidt	
2005 (14th)	Shaun of the Dead	Edgar Wright	
2005 (14th)	Dawn of the Dead	Zack Snyder	
2005 (14th)	Hellboy	Guillermo del Toro	
2005 (14th)	Open Water	Chris Kentis	
2005 (14th)	Saw	James Wan	
2006 (15th)	The Devil's Rejects	Rob Zombie	
2006 (15th)	High Tension	Alexandre Aja	
2006 (15th)	Land of the Dead	George A. Romero	
2006 (15th)	The Exorcism of Emily Rose	Scott Derrickson	
2006 (15th)	Wolf Creek	Greg McLean	
~~2007~~	Cancelled		
~~2008~~	Cancelled		
2009 (16th)	Hellboy II: The Golden Army	Guillermo del Toro	
2009 (16th)	Cloverfield	Matt Reeves	
2009 (16th)	Quarantine	John Erick Dowdle	
2009 (16th)	The Ruins	Carter Smith	
2009 (16th)	The Strangers	Bryan Bertino	

=== 2010s ===
Year	Film	Director	Ref
2010 (17th)	Drag Me to Hell	Sam Raimi	
2010 (17th)	Paranormal Activity	Oren Peli	
2010 (17th)	The Last House on the Left	Dennis Iliadis	
2010 (17th)	The Road	John Hillcoat	
2010 (17th)	Zombieland	Ruben Fleischer	
2011 (18th)	Black Swan	Darren Aronofsky	
2011 (18th)	Let Me In	Matt Reeves	
2011 (18th)	Splice	Vincenzo Natali	
2011 (18th)	The Crazies	Breck Eisner	
2011 (18th)	The Last Exorcism	Daniel Stamm	
2012 (19th)	Insidious	James Wan	
2012 (19th)	Don't Be Afraid of the Dark	Troy Nixey	
2012 (19th)	Drive Angry	Patrick Lussier	
2012 (19th)	Final Destination 5	Steven Quale	
2012 (19th)	Fright Night	Craig Gillespie	
2012 (19th)	Paranormal Activity 3	Henry Joost and Ariel Schulman	
2013 (20th)	The Cabin in the Woods	Drew Goddard	
2013 (20th)	ParaNorman	Sam Fell and Chris Butler	
2013 (20th)	Sinister	Scott Derrickson	
2013 (20th)	The Grey	Joe Carnahan	
2013 (20th)	The Woman in Black	James Watkins	
2014 (21st)	The Conjuring	James Wan	
2014 (21st)	Evil Dead	Fede Álvarez	
2014 (21st)	Insidious: Chapter 2	James Wan	
2014 (21st)	Mama	Andy Muschietti	
2014 (21st)	You're Next	Adam Wingard	
2015 (22nd)	Oculus	Mike Flanagan	
2015 (22nd)	As Above, So Below	John Erick Dowdle	
2015 (22nd)	Dracula Untold	Gary Shore	
2015 (22nd)	Godzilla	Gareth Edwards	
2015 (22nd)	The Quiet Ones	John Pogue	
2016 (23rd)	It Follows	David Robert Mitchell	
2016 (23rd)	Crimson Peak	Guillermo del Toro	
2016 (23rd)	Krampus	Michael Dougherty	
2016 (23rd)	The Gift	Joel Edgerton	
2016 (23rd)	The Visit	M. Night Shyamalan	
2017 (24th)	The Witch	Robert Eggers	
2017 (24th)	Green Room	Jeremy Saulnier	
2017 (24th)	10 Cloverfield Lane	Dan Trachtenberg	
2017 (24th)	Don't Breathe	Fede Álvarez	
2017 (24th)	Ouija: Origin of Evil	Mike Flanagan	
~~2018~~	Cancelled		
2019 (25th)	Hereditary	Ari Aster	
2019 (25th)	Halloween	David Gordon Green	
2019 (25th)	Overlord	Julius Avery	
2019 (25th)	A Quiet Place	John Krasinski	
2019 (25th)	Upgrade	Leigh Whannell	

=== 2020s ===
Year	Film	Director	Ref
2020 (26th)	Midsommar	Ari Aster	
2020 (26th)	Crawl	Alexandre Aja	
2020 (26th)	Doctor Sleep	Mike Flanagan	
2020 (26th)	It Chapter Two	Andy Muschietti	
2020 (26th)	Ready or Not	Matt Bettinelli-Olpin and Tyler Gillett	
2020 (26th)	Us	Jordan Peele	
2021 (27th)	The Invisible Man	Leigh Whannell	
2021 (27th)	Freaky	Christopher Landon	
2021 (27th)	Gretel & Hansel	Oz Perkins	
2021 (27th)	The Hunt	Craig Zobel	
2021 (27th)	Underwater	William Eubank	
2022 (28th)	Malignant	James Wan	
2022 (28th)	Candyman	Nia DaCosta	
2022 (28th)	Last Night in Soho	Edgar Wright	
2022 (28th)	The Night House	David Bruckner	
2022 (28th)	A Quiet Place Part II	John Krasinski	
2023 (29th)	The Black Phone	Scott Derrickson	
2023 (29th)	Barbarian	Zach Cregger	
2023 (29th)	Nope	Jordan Peele	
2023 (29th)	Pearl	Ti West	
2023 (29th)	X	Ti West	
2024 (30th)	Godzilla Minus One	Takashi Yamazaki	
2024 (30th)	Abigail	Matt Bettinelli-Olpin and Tyler Gillett	
2024 (30th)	Evil Dead Rise	Lee Cronin	
2024 (30th)	The First Omen	Arkasha Stevenson	
2024 (30th)	Infinity Pool	Brandon Cronenberg	
2024 (30th)	Late Night with the Devil	Colin and Cameron Cairnes	
2024 (30th)	M3GAN	Gerard Johnstone	
2024 (30th)	Satanic Hispanics	Mike Mendez, Demián Rugna, Eduardo Sánchez, Gigi Saul Guerrero, and Alejandro Brugués	
2024 (30th)	Talk to Me	Danny and Michael Philippou	
2024 (30th)	When Evil Lurks	Demián Rugna	
2025 (31st)	Sinners	Ryan Coogler	
2025 (31st)	28 Years Later	Danny Boyle	
2025 (31st)	Bring Her Back	Danny and Michael Philippou	
2025 (31st)	Final Destination Bloodlines	Zach Lipovsky and Adam Stein	
2025 (31st)	Heretic	Scott Beck and Bryan Woods	
2025 (31st)	Longlegs	Oz Perkins	
2025 (31st)	Nosferatu	Robert Eggers	
2025 (31st)	Strange Darling	JT Mollner	
2025 (31st)	The Substance	Coralie Fargeat	
2025 (31st)	The Ugly Stepsister	Emilie Blichfeldt	
2026 (32nd)	Obsession	Curry Barker	
2026 (32nd)	28 Years Later: The Bone Temple	Nia DaCosta	
2026 (32nd)	Backrooms	Kane Parsons	
2026 (32nd)	The Bride!	Maggie Gyllenhaal	
2026 (32nd)	Faces of Death	Daniel Goldhaber	
2026 (32nd)	Forbidden Fruits	Meredith Alloway	
2026 (32nd)	Hokum	Damian McCarthy	
2026 (32nd)	Leviticus	Adrian Chiarella	
2026 (32nd)	Send Help	Sam Raimi	
2026 (32nd)	Weapons	Zach Cregger	
