= Fangoria Chainsaw Awards =

Awards for horror and thriller films and television

- Current: 2026 Fangoria Chainsaw Awards
- The Fangoria Chainsaw Award trophy
- Awarded for: Best in Horror
- Country: United States
- Presented by: Fangoria
- First award: 1992
- Website: fangoria.com/chainsaw-awards

The Fangoria Chainsaw Awards is an award ceremony focused on horror and thriller films run by Fangoria, an American horror film fan magazine. Beginning in 1992, the awards were expanded and an annual ceremony was inaugurated to give out the awards. As of 2015, Fangoria also delivers awards to television series.

== Ceremonies ==
Year	Host(s)	Best Wide Release	Best Limited Release	Best International Movie	Best Streaming Premiere	Ref
1992	Bruce Campbell	The Silence of the Lambs	Bride of Re-Animator	Not awarded	Not awarded	
1993	Bruce Campbell	Bram Stoker's Dracula	The Resurrected	Not awarded	Not awarded	
1994	Linnea Quigley	Army of Darkness	Dead Alive	Not awarded	Not awarded	
1995	Rick Overton and Scott LaRose	The Crow	Phantasm III: Lord of the Dead	Not awarded	Not awarded	
1996	Rick Overton and Scott LaRose	Seven	Castle Freak	Not awarded	Not awarded	
1997	No host	Scream	Cemetery Man	Not awarded	Not awarded	
1998	No host	Scream 2	Lost Highway	Not awarded	Not awarded	
1999	No host	Dark City	The Night Flier	Not awarded	Not awarded	
2000	No host	The Sixth Sense	The Day of the Beast	Not awarded	Not awarded	
2001	No host	American Psycho	Cherry Falls	Not awarded	Not awarded	
2002	No host	Jeepers Creepers	Ginger Snaps	Not awarded	Not awarded	
2003	No host	The Ring	Dog Soldiers	Not awarded	Not awarded	
2004	No host	28 Days Later	Bubba Ho-Tep	Not awarded	Not awarded	
2005	No host	Shaun of the Dead	Ginger Snaps 2: Unleashed	Not awarded	Not awarded	
2006	No host	The Devil's Rejects	Toolbox Murders	Not awarded	Not awarded	
~~2007~~	Cancelled					
~~2008~~	Cancelled					
2009	No host	Hellboy II: The Golden Army	Let the Right One In	Not awarded	Not awarded	
2010	No host	Drag Me to Hell	Trick 'r Treat	Not awarded	Not awarded	
2011	No host	Black Swan	The Human Centipede (First Sequence)	Not awarded	Not awarded	
2012	No host	Insidious	Tucker & Dale vs. Evil	Trollhunter	Not awarded	
2013	No host	The Cabin in the Woods	Absentia	Juan of the Dead	Not awarded	
2014	No host	The Conjuring	V/H/S/2	Here Comes the Devil	Not awarded	
2015	No host	Oculus	The Babadook	Big Bad Wolves	Not awarded	
2016	No host	It Follows	What We Do in the Shadows	Goodnight Mommy	Not awarded	
2017	No host	The Witch	The Autopsy of Jane Doe	Train to Busan	Not awarded	
~~2018~~	Cancelled					
2019	No host	Hereditary	Mandy	Terrified	Bird Box	
2020	Shock Waves	Midsommar	The Lighthouse	Tigers Are Not Afraid	The Perfection	
2021	David Dastmalchian	The Invisible Man	Color Out of Space	La Llorona	Host	
2022	David Dastmalchian	Malignant	PG: Psycho Goreman	Titane	Fear Street Part Three: 1666	
2023	David Dastmalchian and Peaches Christ	The Black Phone	Terrifier 2	Speak No Evil	Prey	
2024	David Dastmalchian and Angel Melanson	Godzilla Minus One	I Saw the TV Glow	When Evil Lurks	V/H/S/85	
2025	Josh Ruben and Barbara Crampton	Sinners	Azrael	Oddity	Mr. Crocket	
2026	Devon Sawa	Obsession	Dust Bunny	Exit 8	V/H/S/Halloween	

== Categories ==
=== Film ===
- Best Wide Release
- Best Limited Release
- Best Streaming Premiere Film - since 2019
- Best International Film - since 2019
- Best Documentary Film - since 2022
- Best First Film - since 2019
- Best Director - since 2019
- Best Lead Performance - since 2021
- Best Supporting Performance - since 2021
- Best Screenplay
- Best Score - since 1992
- Best Cinematography - since 2023
- Best Makeup FX - since 1992
- Best Creature FX - since 2019
- Best Costume Design - since 2022
- Best Documentary Feature
- Best Kill - since 2019

=== Television ===
- Best TV Series
- Best Nonfiction Series or Miniseries

=== Other ===
- Best Video Game
- Best Public Domain Resurrection
- Fangoria Horror Hall of Fame
- Fangoria Lifetime Achievement Award
- The Editor's Eyeball Award

=== Discontinued awards ===
- Worst Film - 1992 - 2017
- Best Actor - 1992 - 2020
- Best Actress - 1992 - 2020
- Best Supporting Actor - 1992 - 2020
- Best Supporting Actress - 1992 - 2020
- Best TV Actor
- Best TV Actress
- Best TV Supporting Actor
- Best TV Supporting Actress
- Best TV SFX

== Films with multiple wins ==
Films with 4 and more wins.

Wins	Films
6	Bram Stoker’s Dracula
6	Hereditary
5	Army of Darkness
5	Black Swan
5	Midsommar
5	Obsession
4	The Babadook
4	Evil Dead Rise
4	The Cabin in the Woods
4	Insidious
4	Let the Right One In
4	Scream
4	Shaun of the Dead
4	The Silence of the Lambs
4	Sinners
4	The Sixth Sense
