= Nightstalker (film) =

- Directed by: Chris Fisher
- Written by: Chris Fisher
- Produced by: Chris Fisher; Ash R. Shah
- Cinematography: Eliot Rockett
- Edited by: Daniel R. Padgett
- Music by: Ryan Beveridge
- Release date: November 10, 2002
- Running time: 95 minutes
- Country: United States
- Language: English

Nightstalker is a 2002 American crime horror film written, directed, and produced by Chris Fisher about Richard Ramirez. It was nominated for two Fangoria Chainsaw Awards.

== Cast ==
- Bret Roberts as Night Stalker
- Roselyn Sanchez as Gabriella Martinez
- Danny Trejo as Officer Frank Luis
- Brandi Emma as Adrianne Deloia
- A. J. Buckley as Somo
- Douglas Spain as Father Rodriguez
- Lillian Hurst as Thelma Martinez
- Chay Santini as Teenage Girl
- Patricia Rae as Teenager's Mother
