= 2004 Fangoria Chainsaw Awards =

2004 horror film awards show

13th Fangoria Chainsaw Awards
- Presented by: Fangoria
- Presented on: May 20, 2004
- Site: Los Angeles, California

Highlights
- Most awards: 28 Days Later, Bubba Ho-Tep and House of 1000 Corpses (2)
- Most nominations: 28 Days Later (7)

The 2004 Fangoria Chainsaw Awards, presented by Fangoria magazine and Creation Entertainment, honored the best horror films of 2003.

== Winners and nominees ==
Best Wide Release	Best Limited Release
28 Days Later − Directed by Danny Boyle; Cabin Fever − Directed by Eli Roth; House of 1000 Corpses − Directed by Rob Zombie; The Texas Chainsaw Massacre − Directed by Marcus Nispel; Wrong Turn − Directed by Rob Schmidt	Bubba Ho-Tep − Directed by Don Coscarelli; Beyond Re-Animator − Directed by Brian Yuzna; May − Directed by Lucky McKee; Nightstalker − Directed by Chris Fisher; Spider − Directed by David Cronenberg
Best Actor	Best Actress
Bruce Campbell − Bubba Ho-Tep as Elvis Presley / Sebastian Haff; Cillian Murphy − 28 Days Later as Jim; Crispin Glover − Willard as Willard Stiles; Ralph Fiennes − Spider as Dennis "Spider" Cleg; Robert Englund − Freddy vs. Jason as Freddy Krueger	Angela Bettis − May as May Dove Canady; Angelica Lee − The Eye as Wong Kar-mun; Jessica Biel − The Texas Chainsaw Massacre as Erin Hardesty; Radha Mitchell − Visitors as Georgia Perry; Roselyn Sanchez − Nightstalker as Gabriella Martinez
Best Supporting Actor	Best Supporting Actress
Sid Haig − House of 1000 Corpses as Captain Spaulding; Brendan Gleeson − 28 Days Later as Frank; Ossie Davis − Bubba Ho-Tep as John F. "Jack" Kennedy; R. Lee Ermey − The Texas Chainsaw Massacre as Sheriff Winston Hoyt / Charlie Hewitt Jr.; Ray Wise − Jeepers Creepers 2 as Jack Taggart	Karen Black − House of 1000 Corpses as Mother Firefly; Anna Faris − May as Polly; Miranda Richardson − Spider as Yvonne / Mrs. Cleg; Naomie Harris − 28 Days Later as Selena; Susannah York − Visitors as Carolyn Perry
Best Screenplay	Best Score
28 Days Later − Alex Garland; Bubba Ho-Tep − Don Coscarelli; Cabin Fever − Eli Roth and Randy Pearlstein; May − Lucky McKee; Spider − Patrick McGrath	Cabin Fever − Nathan Barr and Angelo Badalamenti; Dreamcatcher − James Newton Howard; Flesh for the Beast − Buckethead; Spider − Howard Shore; Willard − Shirley Walker
Best Make-Up/Creature FX	Worst Film
Freddy vs. Jason − Bill Terezakis; Cabin Fever − KNB EFX Group; 28 Days Later − Cliff Wallace, Alan Hedgcock and Creature Effects; House of 1000 Corpses − Wayne Toth; Jeepers Creepers 2 − Brian Penikas	House of the Dead − Directed by Uwe Boll; 28 Days Later − Directed by Danny Boyle; Cabin Fever − Directed by Eli Roth; Dreamcatcher − Directed by Lawrence Kasdan; House of 1000 Corpses − Directed by Rob Zombie; Jeepers Creepers 2 − Directed by Victor Salva; The Texas Chainsaw Massacre − Directed by Marcus Nispel

== Fangoria Horror Hall of Fame ==
- Don Coscarelli
