= Cherry Falls =

1999 film by Geoffrey Wright

- French theatrical release poster
- Directed by: Geoffrey Wright
- Written by: Ken Selden
- Produced by: Marshall Persinger; Eli Selden
- Starring: Brittany Murphy; Jay Mohr; Gabriel Mann; Michael Biehn
- Cinematography: Anthony B. Richmond
- Edited by: John F. Link
- Music by: Walter Werzowa
- Production companies: Rogue Pictures; Good Machine; Industry Entertainment
- Distributed by: USA Films
- Release dates: May 28, 1999 (France); August 25, 2000 (United Kingdom); October 20, 2000 (United States)
- Running time: 91 minutes
- Country: United States
- Language: English
- Budget: $14 million

Cherry Falls is a 1999 American slasher film directed by Geoffrey Wright, and starring Brittany Murphy, Jay Mohr, and Michael Biehn. The plot focuses on a small Virginia town where a serial killer is targeting teenaged virgins. After being submitted to and rejected by the MPAA numerous times, Cherry Falls premiered in May 1999 at Marché du Film in France and subsequently screened at several film festivals in some countries in early 2000, but did not have a theatrical release in the United States. Finally it was purchased by USA Films, who telecast it in the fall of 2000.

== Plot ==
In the woods outside of Cherry Falls, Virginia, a teenage couple, Rod Harper and Stacy Twelfmann are getting romantic in a car when a black-haired woman appears and murders them both. Meanwhile, in town, teenager Jody Marken, the daughter of the local sheriff, is with her boyfriend, Kenny, who thinks it is time to "see other people." Jody goes back home to find her father, Brent, upset that she is out past her curfew. Brent and his deputies begin to investigate the murders the next day. They see that the killer carved the word "virgin" into both victims. At school, Brent sees English teacher Mr. Leonard Marliston, who urges him to divulge more details of the murder to students and the town so as to eliminate the possibility of secrets.

Annette Duwald, also a virgin, is home alone when she is killed in the same manner as the other two teenagers. Concerned for the town's safety, Brent holds a meeting at the high school to tell parents the nature of the crimes. No students are invited, but Jody and her friend Timmy, who stayed after school, witness the meeting. Timmy asks to borrow Jody's cell phone and goes into the stairwell to make a call. Jody goes downstairs to find him and discovers his dead body in a locker room. She is confronted by the killer, who attacks her, but she manages to escape. At the police station, Jody describes the killer to an officer, who draws a composite. Brent confides with an old friend, Tom Sisler, the current high school principal, that the suspect looks like "Lora Lee Sherman." The two are both visibly nervous, and Jody listens in on their conversation.

Back at school, Jody and Kenny reconcile. Later Jody learns from her mother about the tale of Lora Lee. Twenty-five years ago, Lora Lee was a high school loner. She claimed that four popular boys at school, including Brent and the high school principal, raped her one night. Her cries fell on deaf ears, and she left the city for the rural outskirts, where she was rarely seen or heard from again. After Jody discovers the truth, disappointed with the hypocrisy of her parents, she visits Kenny at his house. They talk, and Jody, being upset with her parents, tries to have sex with Kenny. He refuses, causing her to get upset and leave.

After catching news of the killer's targeting of virgins, the high school students in town congregate at an abandoned hunting lodge to indulge in a mass orgy. Brent goes to the school to meet Sisler only to find the principal dead in his office with the words "virgin not" carved into his forehead. Before Brent can react, he is knocked out by the killer. Jody, who has refused to attend the orgy with Kenny, is out riding her bike when she cycles by Mr. Marliston's house and witnesses him dragging a heavy trunk inside. She helps him get it into the house, and he casually mentions that her father is inside it. She opens it and finds her father, beaten and bloody, before she is knocked unconscious. At the orgy, Kenny is about to have sex with a girl when he has second thoughts and leaves to find Jody. Driving around, he is puzzled to see her bicycle outside of Marliston's house.

In his basement, Marliston puts on a wig and makeup to "become" Lora Lee Sherman. Marliston reveals that he is Lora Lee Sherman's illegitimate son and asks Brent to retell the story of what happened that night 25 years ago. Brent reveals that the four boys, including himself, did indeed rape Lora Lee. Marliston says his mother became an abusive "psycho" after the rape and that one of the rapists is his father; there is an implication that Brent is in fact Marliston's biological father. By targeting virgins, Marliston would rob all the wealthy parents of their "precious virginal children".

Kenny enters the house and frees Jody as Brent fights with Marliston, who brutally kills him. Jody and Kenny flee to the orgy with Marliston in furious pursuit, killing a deputy en route. He bursts inside wielding an axe, and mass panic erupts. After wildly stabbing panicking students and then trying to escape, Marliston fights both Jody and Kenny, with Kenny being severely wounded during the melee. Eventually, Marliston is pushed off a balcony by Jody and impaled on fence posts. At first he seems to be dead, before reviving briefly only to be promptly shot dead by Deputy Sheriff Mina, who unloads two pistols into him. The next day, Jody hides the reasons for the killings from the police, and she and her mother head away from the station. As they leave town, Jody sees someone resembling Lora Lee Sherman disappear behind a moving school bus. The film ends with a shot of the waterfalls outside town, turning red.

== Cast ==
- Brittany Murphy as Jody Marken
- Jay Mohr as Leonard Marliston
- Gabriel Mann as Kenny Ascott
- Michael Biehn as Sheriff Brent Marken
- Jesse Bradford as Rod Harper
- DJ Qualls as Wally
- Kristen Miller as Cindy
- Candy Clark as Marge Marken
- Amanda Anka as Deputy Sheriff Mina
- Joe Inscoe as Principal Tom Sisler
- Natalie Ramsey as Sandy
- Douglas Spain as Mark
- Bre Blair as Stacy Twelfmann
- Michael Weston as Ben
- Keram Malicki-Sanchez as Timmy
- Vicki Davis as Heather
- Rick Forrester as Deputy Beau
- Clementine Ford as Annette Duwald
- Colin Fickes as Dino
- Zachary Knighton as Mr. Rolly

== Production ==
In October 1998, Variety announced Geoffrey Wright as director. Wright promised an intelligent script full of irony. In 1999, the filmmakers began scouting locations in Virginia, using the town square in Warrenton; the high school used in the film was Thomas Jefferson High School, located in Richmond. The residents of Richmond lambasted the making of the film because of its brutality.

The film's set was described as "tense" by writer Ken Selden, due to the thirty-day production schedule falling behind, which led to budget issues from October Films. Director Geoffrey Wright kept Selden's original script relatively unchanged, but re-wrote the film's final "orgy scene", which had originally been conceived by Selden as featuring the teenagers having a mass sex party under a giant white sheet. Wright opted to shoot the scene with the cast nude, which resulted in much of the scene being cut in order to avoid an NC-17 rating.

Wright said that working with Michael Biehn was difficult because of the actor's personal troubles. The crew lost Biehn for two weeks, and Wright had to "shoot [the film] around him."

== Release ==
Cherry Falls was shopped at the Cannes film market in 1999, and was sold for theatrical distribution in all international territories across the world. The film had a tentative theatrical release scheduled for November 2000. However, the film was troubled by censor disapproval in the United States, and the distributors' relationship with USA Films led the company to make the decision to release it as a television movie in the United States, syndicated on the USA Network. As a result, it unintentionally became (and remains) the most expensive television film ever made, with a production budget of $14 million. Cherry Falls was released in the United States on October 20, 2000.

The film had successful theatrical runs in the United Kingdom and throughout Europe. It opened in the United Kingdom on August 25, 2000.

== Reception ==
On review aggregator website Rotten Tomatoes, the film has an approval rating of 65% based on 20 critics' reviews, with an average score of 6.00/10. Doug Brod of Entertainment Weekly rated it A− and wrote that "it might just be the wittiest, most subversive teen thriller since Heathers". AllMovie gave it a favorable review: "Of all the teen slasher flicks that premiered after the wildly successful Scream series (Urban Legend, etc.), Cherry Falls will possibly go down as one of the most creative, but sadly unseen ones in the bunch".

Derek Elley of Variety called it "a semi-successful spin on familiar material that could build minor cult status". Nathan Rabin of The A.V. Club wrote: "Smart at times but not nearly smart enough, and peppered with good ideas it doesn't really know how to exploit, Cherry Falls is just good enough to make you wish it were far, far better". Chris Parcellin of Film Threat rated it 3/5 stars and wrote that "it aspires to be another Heathers or Rivers Edge, but doesn't make it". Total Film rated it 3/5 stars and wrote: "If you're not already sick to death of the teen horror genre, you might want to give this a look".

Matt Serafini of Dread Central ranked Cherry Falls number seven in a list of the top ten high school horror films from 1996 to the present.

=== Accolades ===
Wright won Best Director at the Sitges Film Festival, and the movie itself was nominated for Best Picture. At the 2001 Fangoria Chainsaw Awards Brittany Murphy was nominated for the Best Actress award, and Cherry Falls won the Best Limited-Release/Direct-to-Video Film award.

== Home media ==
The film was released on VHS by USA Home Entertainment, as well as on DVD in a double feature disc paired with Terror Tract (2000). This disc remained out of print since the early 2000s. Scream Factory released the film on Blu-ray in the spring of 2016. In their statement, it was revealed they had attempted to license the uncut version of the film but were unable to procure it through USA Films. The film's director Geoffrey Wright also stated that he did not possess the original cut of the film, and was thus unable to provide it for the release, so they released the original cut as seen in the film's original telecast.
