= 2003 Fangoria Chainsaw Awards =

Annual US horror film awards ceremony

12th Fangoria Chainsaw Awards
- Presented by: Fangoria
- Presented on: June 17, 2003
- Site: Los Angeles, California

Highlights
- Most awards: The Ring (3)
- Most nominations: Wendigo (5)

The 2003 Fangoria Chainsaw Awards, presented by Fangoria magazine and Creation Entertainment, honored the best horror films of 2002.

== Winners and nominees ==
Best Wide Release	Best Limited Release
The Ring − Directed by Gore Verbinski; Blade II − Directed by Guillermo del Toro; Brotherhood of the Wolf − Directed by Christophe Gans; Frailty − Directed by Bill Paxton; Signs − Directed by M. Night Shyamalan	Dog Soldiers − Directed by Neil Marshall; Dagon − Directed by Stuart Gordon; Wendigo − Directed by Larry Fessenden; She Creature − Directed by Sebastian Gutierrez; Wolf Girl − Directed by Thom Fitzgerald
Best Actor	Best Actress
Robin Williams − One Hour Photo as Sy Parrish; Anthony Hopkins − Red Dragon as Hannibal Lecter; Jake Weber − Wendigo as George; Mel Gibson − Signs as Father Graham Hess; Michael Reilly Burke − Ted Bundy as Ted Bundy	Naomi Watts − The Ring as Rachel Keller; Aaliyah − Queen of the Damned as Akasha; Laura Linney − The Mothman Prophecies as Connie Mills; Patricia Clarkson − Wendigo as Kim; Victoria Sanchez − Wolf Girl as Tara the Wolf Girl
Best Supporting Actor	Best Supporting Actress
Ralph Fiennes − Red Dragon as Francis Dolarhyde; Erik Per Sullivan − Wendigo as Miles; Liam Cunningham − Dog Soldiers as Captain Richard Ryan; Thomas Kretschmann − Blade II as Eli Damaskinos; Will Patton − The Mothman Prophecies as Gordon Smallwood	Monica Bellucci − Brotherhood of the Wolf as Sylvia; Boti Bliss − Ted Bundy as Lee; Connie Nielsen − One Hour Photo as Nina Yorkin; Emily Watson− Red Dragon as Reba McClane; Emma Cleasby − Dog Soldiers as Megan
Best Screenplay	Best Score
Frailty − Brent Hanley; Blade II − David S. Goyer; Dagon − Dennis Paoli; Wendigo − Larry Fessenden; Wolf Girl − Lori Lansens	The Ring − Hans Zimmer; Below − Graeme Revell; Brotherhood of the Wolf − Joseph LoDuca; Frailty − Brian Tyler; Trouble Every Day − Tindersticks
Best Make-Up/Creature FX	Worst Film
Blade II − Steve Johnson and Tippett Studio; Brotherhood of the Wolf − Jim Henson's Creature Shop; Dagon − DDT Efectos Especiales; No Such Thing − Mark Rappaport; She Creature − Stan Winston Studio	FeardotCom − Directed by William Malone; Ghost Ship − Directed by Steve Beck; Halloween: Resurrection − Directed by Rick Rosenthal; Signs − Directed by M. Night Shyamalan; The Ring − Directed by Gore Verbinski
