= 2001 Fangoria Chainsaw Awards =

Annual US horror film awards ceremony

10th Fangoria Chainsaw Awards
- Presented by: Fangoria
- Presented on: 2001
- Site: Los Angeles, California

Highlights
- Most awards: The Cell (3)
- Most nominations: Requiem for a Dream (7)

The 2001 Fangoria Chainsaw Awards, presented by Fangoria magazine and Creation Entertainment, honored the best horror films of 2000.

== Winners and nominees ==
Best Wide Release	Best Limited Release
American Psycho − Directed by Mary Harron; Final Destination − Directed by James Wong; Pitch Black − Directed by David Twohy; Shadow of the Vampire − Directed by E. Elias Merhige; The Cell − Directed by Tarsem Singh	Cherry Falls − Directed by Geoffrey Wright; Lighthouse − Directed by Simon Hunter; Requiem for a Dream − Directed by Darren Aronofsky; The Phantom Lover − Directed by Ronny Yu; The Wisdom of Crocodiles − Directed by Po-Chih Leong
Best Actor	Best Actress
Christian Bale − American Psycho as Patrick Bateman; Kevin Bacon − Hollow Man as Sebastian Caine; Jude Law − The Wisdom of Crocodiles as Steven Grlscz; Vin Diesel − Pitch Black as Richard B. Riddick; Willem Dafoe − Shadow of the Vampire as Max Schreck	Ellen Burstyn − Requiem for a Dream as Sara Goldfarb; Brittany Murphy − Cherry Falls as Jody Marken; Cate Blanchett − The Gift as Annabelle "Annie" Wilson; Michelle Pfeiffer − What Lies Beneath as Claire Spencer; Radha Mitchell − Pitch Black as Carolyn Fry
Best Supporting Actor	Best Supporting Actress
Vincent D'Onofrio − The Cell as Carl Rudolph Stargher; Keanu Reeves − The Gift as Donnie Barksdale; Marlon Wayans − Requiem for a Dream as Tyrone C. Love; Michael Parks − From Dusk Till Dawn 3: The Hangman's Daughter as Ambrose Bierce; Udo Kier − Shadow of the Vampire as Albin Grau	Parker Posey − Scream 3 as Jennifer Jolie; Barbara Jefford − The Ninth Gate as Baroness Frieda Kessler; Chloë Sevigny − American Psycho as Jean; Erica Leerhsen − Book of Shadows: Blair Witch 2 as Erica Geerson; Jennifer Connelly − Requiem for a Dream as Marion Silver
Best Screenplay	Best Score
Shadow of the Vampire − Steven A. Katz; American Psycho − Mary Harron and Guinevere Turner; Pitch Black − Ken and Jim Wheat and David Twohy; Requiem for a Dream − Darren Aronofsky and Hubert Selby Jr.; The Cell − Mark Protosevich	The Cell − Howard Shore; American Psycho − John Cale; Hollow Man − Jerry Goldsmith; Requiem for a Dream − Clint Mansell; The Ninth Gate − Wojciech Kilar
Best Make-Up/Creature FX	Worst Film
Shadow of the Vampire − Pauline Fowler, Julian Murray and Amber Sibley; The Cell − Michèle Burke; Komodo − John Cox and Tippett Studio; Pitch Black − Patrick Tatopoulos and John Cox; Requiem for a Dream − Vincent J. Guastini	Book of Shadows: Blair Witch 2 − Directed by Joe Berlinger; Hellraiser: Inferno − Directed by Scott Derrickson; Urban Legends: Final Cut − Directed by John Ottman

== Fangoria Horror Hall of Fame ==
- Udo Kier
- Joe Dante
