= 2000 Fangoria Chainsaw Awards =

Annual US horror film awards ceremony

9th Fangoria Chainsaw Awards
- Presented by: Fangoria
- Presented on: 2000
- Site: Los Angeles, California

Highlights
- Most awards: The Sixth Sense (4)
- Most nominations: Existenz, Sleepy Hollow and The Sixth Sense (5)

The 2000 Fangoria Chainsaw Awards, presented by Fangoria magazine and Creation Entertainment, honored the best horror films of 1999.

== Winners and nominees ==
Best Wide Release	Best Limited Release
The Sixth Sense − Directed by M. Night Shyamalan; Existenz − Directed by David Cronenberg; Sleepy Hollow − Directed by Tim Burton; Stir of Echoes − Directed by David Koepp; The Blair Witch Project − Directed by Daniel Myrick and Eduardo Sánchez	The Day of the Beast − Directed by Álex de la Iglesia; Open Your Eyes − Directed by Alejandro Amenábar; Perfect Blue − Directed by Satoshi Kon; The Eternal − Directed by Michael Almereyda; The Stendhal Syndrome − Directed by Dario Argento
Best Actor	Best Actress
Johnny Depp − Sleepy Hollow as Ichabod Crane; Álex Angulo − The Day of the Beast as Father Ángel Berriartúa; Bruce Willis − The Sixth Sense as Malcolm Crowe; Kevin Bacon − Stir of Echoes as Tom Witzky; Robert Carlyle − Ravenous as F.W. Colqhoun / Colonel Ives	Heather Donahue − The Blair Witch Project as Heather; Asia Argento − The Stendhal Syndrome as Anna Manni; Emily Bergl − The Rage: Carrie 2 as Rachel Lang; Jennifer Jason Leigh − Existenz as Allegra Geller; Jillian McWhirter − Progeny as Sherry Burton
Best Supporting Actor	Best Supporting Actress
Haley Joel Osment − The Sixth Sense as Cole Sear; Arnold Vosloo − The Mummy as Imhotep; Joshua Leonard− The Blair Witch Project as Joshua; Santiago Segura − The Day of the Beast as José María; Seth Green − Idle Hands as Mick	Toni Collette − The Sixth Sense as Lynn Sear; Famke Janssen − House on Haunted Hill as Evelyn Stockard-Price; Illeana Douglas − Stir of Echoes as Lisa; Miranda Richardson − Sleepy Hollow as Lady Mary Van Tassel; Penélope Cruz − Open Your Eyes as Sofía
Best Screenplay	Best Score
The Sixth Sense − M. Night Shyamalan; Existenz − David Cronenberg; Open Your Eyes − Alejandro Amenábar and Mateo Gil; Stir of Echoes − David Koepp; The Day of the Beast − Jorge Guerricaechevarría and Álex de la Iglesia	Sleepy Hollow − Danny Elfman; Existenz − Howard Shore; Ravenous − Michael Nyman and Damon Albarn; The Mummy − Jerry Goldsmith; The Stendhal Syndrome − Ennio Morricone
Best Make-Up/Creature FX	Worst Film
Sleepy Hollow − Kevin Yagher; Existenz − James Isaac and Stephan Dupuis; Idle Hands − Greg Cannom; Progeny − Screaming Mad George; The Mummy − Nick Dudman and John Berton	The Haunting − Directed by Jan de Bont; The Blair Witch Project − Directed by Daniel Myrick and Eduardo Sánchez

== Fangoria Horror Hall of Fame ==
- Tim Burton
- Paul Naschy
