= 2014 Fangoria Chainsaw Awards =

Annual US horror film awards ceremony

21st Fangoria Chainsaw Awards
- Presented by: Fangoria
- Presented on: 2014
- Site: Los Angeles, California

Highlights
- Most awards: The Conjuring and Maniac (2)
- Most nominations: We Are What We Are (6)

The 2014 Fangoria Chainsaw Awards, presented by Fangoria magazine and Creation Entertainment, honored the best horror films of 2013.

== Winners and nominees ==
Best Wide Release	Best Limited Release
The Conjuring − Directed by James Wan; Evil Dead − Directed by Fede Álvarez; Insidious: Chapter 2 − Directed by James Wan; Mama − Directed by Andy Muschietti; You're Next − Directed by Adam Wingard	V/H/S/2 − Directed by Simon Barrett, Adam Wingard, Eduardo Sánchez, Gregg Hale, Timo Tjahjanto, Gareth Huw Evans and Jason Eisener; Berberian Sound Studio − Directed by Peter Strickland; Byzantium − Directed by Neil Jordan; Stoker − Directed by Park Chan-wook; We Are What We Are − Directed by Jim Mickle
Best Actor	Best Actress
Elijah Wood − Maniac as Frank Zito; Bill Sage − We Are What We Are as Frank Parker; Francisco Barreiro − Here Comes the Devil as Felix; Patrick Wilson − Insidious: Chapter 2 as Josh Lambert; Toby Jones − Berberian Sound Studio as Gilderoy	Katharine Isabelle − American Mary as Mary Mason; Juno Temple − Magic Magic as Alicia; Mia Wasikowska − Stoker as India Stoker; Saoirse Ronan − Byzantium as Eleanor Webb; Sharni Vinson − You're Next as Erin
Best Supporting Actor	Best Supporting Actress
Matthew Goode − Stoker as Charlie Stoker; Joe Swanberg − You're Next as Drake Davison; Lou Taylor Pucci − Evil Dead as Eric; Michael Parks − We Are What We Are as Doctor Barrow; Stephen McHattie − Haunter as Pale Man / Edgar Mullins	Lili Taylor − The Conjuring as Carolyn Perron; Ambyr Childers − We Are What We Are as Iris Parker; Julia Garner − We Are What We Are as Rose Parker; Julianne Moore − Carrie as Margaret White; Tristan Risk − American Mary as Beatress Johnson
Best Screenplay	Best Score
You're Next − Simon Barrett; Grabbers − Kevin Lehane; Haunter − Brian King; Stoker − Wentworth Miller; We Are What We Are − Nick Damici and Jim Mickle	Maniac − Robin Coudert; Berberian Sound Studio − Broadcast; Byzantium − Javier Navarrete; We Are What We Are − Phil Mossman, Darren Morris and Jeff Grace; You're Next − Jasper Lee, Kyle McKinnon and Mads Heldtberg
Best Make-Up/Creature FX	Best International Film
Evil Dead − Roger Murray and Jane O'Kane; Bad Milo! − Justin Raleigh; Frankenstein's Army − Rogier Samuels; Grabbers − Paddy Eason and Shaune Harrison; Hansel & Gretel: Witch Hunters − Mike Elizalde, Tamar Aviv and Jörn Seifert	Here Comes the Devil − Directed by Adrián García Bogliano (Mexico); Horror Stories − Directed by Im Dae-woong, Jung Bum-sik, Hong Ji-young, Kim Gok, Kim Sun and Min Kyu-dong (South Korea); The Condemned − Directed by Roberto Busó-García (Australia); Tormented − Directed by Takashi Shimizu (UK); Wither − Directed by Sonny Laguna and Tommy Wiklund (Sweden)
Worst Film
Texas Chainsaw 3D − Directed by John Luessenhop; Dracula 3D − Directed by Dario Argento; Evil Dead − Directed by Fede Álvarez; The Last Exorcism Part II − Directed by Ed Gass-Donnelly; The Lords of Salem − Directed by Rob Zombie; The Purge − Directed by James DeMonaco

== Fangoria Horror Hall of Fame ==
- James Wan
- Adrian Garcia Bogliano
