= Frailty (2001 film) =

2001 film by Bill Paxton

- Theatrical release poster
- Directed by: Bill Paxton
- Written by: Brent Hanley
- Produced by: David Kirschner
- Starring: Bill Paxton; Matthew McConaughey; Powers Boothe; Luke Askew; Jeremy Sumpter; Matt O'Leary
- Cinematography: Bill Butler
- Edited by: Arnold Glassman
- Music by: Brian Tyler
- Production companies: David Kirschner Productions; American Entertainment Co. Cinerenta Medienbeteiligungs KG; Cinedelta
- Distributed by: Lions Gate Films
- Release dates: November 7, 2001 (Deep Ellum Film Festival); April 12, 2002 (United States)
- Running time: 99 minutes
- Countries: United States; Canada
- Language: English
- Budget: $11 million
- Box office: $17.4 million

Frailty is a 2001 Southern Gothic psychological horror film directed by Bill Paxton and written by Brent Hanley. The film stars Paxton, Matthew McConaughey and Powers Boothe. It marks Paxton's directorial debut. The plot focuses on a strange relationship between two young brothers and their father, who believes that he has been commanded by God to destroy demons disguised as people. The film premiered at the Deep Ellum Film Festival on November 7, 2001, before being released by Lions Gate Films on April 12, 2002, to generally positive reviews from critics and grossing $17.4 million against an $11 million budget. It’s an international co-production film between the United States and Canada.

== Plot ==
Fenton Meiks visits FBI Agent Wesley Doyle's Dallas office and claims his brother Adam is behind the "God's Hand" serial killings that Doyle is investigating. Fenton says that Adam committed suicide, and Fenton buried him in a rose garden in their hometown of Thurman, Texas. The skeptical Doyle calls the Thurman Sheriff's office and learns that Fenton stole Adam's body earlier that day. Fenton begins recounting his childhood to Doyle.

In the summer of 1979, Fenton and Adam live with their father, a local mechanic and a widower, in the groundskeeper's cottage just behind the rose garden. One night Meiks claims that an angel had visited him and tasked their family with "destroying" demons disguised as humans on Earth. Fenton is confused and frightened by the story, whereas the younger Adam seems to believe Meiks. Guided by visions, Meiks acquires three "holy" weapons: an axe carved with the name "Otis", a pair of work gloves, and a section of pipe. He also receives a list of names of people whom he believes to be demons in disguise.

Meiks incapacitates his first victim with the pipe and brings her back to the family home. Upon touching her with his bare hand, Meiks claims to see visions of her evil. Meiks kills the woman with the axe and makes the boys help him bury her body in the rose garden. Horrified, Fenton believes his father has gone insane, but Adam claims to share Meiks' visions and supports his mission.

Doyle handcuffs Fenton and drives him back to Thurman. On the way, Doyle reveals that his own mother was murdered by someone who was never caught. Fenton recalls helping Meiks abduct their second victim in broad daylight, with Meiks claiming that God would blind any witnesses. The brothers again watch as Meiks murders the man in their backyard shed.

Fenton's mental condition deteriorates from the shock and stress. Meiks tells him the angel revealed something terrible about Fenton that he chose not to believe. He then makes Fenton dig a large hole in the backyard, seemingly to test his will and help bring him to faith. Fenton eventually completes the hole without work gloves, while refusing to believe in his father's God. His father then turns the hole into a cellar and he moves the shed directly on top of it.

During the third abduction, Fenton runs to find the local sheriff. Although skeptical, the sheriff takes the boy back home and asks to see the cellar, which is empty. As the sheriff turns to leave, Meiks kills him with the axe.

Meiks is distraught and angry with Fenton for forcing him to kill an innocent man to protect their secret mission. After burying the sheriff's body, Meiks reveals that the angel told him that Fenton is a demon. To save his son, Meiks locks Fenton in the cellar for more than a week with only a cup of water per day. After suffering a mental breakdown, Fenton claims to have his own vision of God. Meiks releases him, happy that his son is ready.

As they abduct the next victim, Fenton accidentally alerts him, resulting in Meiks being injured. In the cellar, Meiks hands the axe to Fenton and commands him to destroy the demon. Instead, Fenton strikes Meiks in the chest with the axe. Adam rushes to Meiks, who whispers something with his dying breath. Adam kills the victim with the axe before Fenton can release him. The boys bury the two men in the rose garden, and Fenton forces Adam to promise to bury him (Fenton) in the garden if Adam ever "destroys" him.

In the present, Doyle and Fenton arrive at the Thurman rose garden. The adult "Fenton" then reveals that he is actually Adam. The real Fenton, possibly seeking to stop others who had received visions like Meiks' (or possibly simply having gone insane), had grown up to become the actual God's Hand serial killer, and was responsible for several murders that were unrelated to Adam's and Meiks's mission. Doyle is horrified to see the number of graves in the garden.

Adam reveals that he did share his father's visions, and that all of their victims were guilty of terrible crimes. Adam then lays his hands on Doyle and confirms that Doyle murdered his own mother. The incapacitated Doyle is placed in an open grave. Adam reveals that Doyle was on the original revealed list and that Adam has continued his father's work for all the ensuing years. Confident that God will protect him, Adam kills Doyle and buries him.

After Doyle's disappearance, Agent Griffin Hull, who had previously met Adam in Dallas, cannot remember his face. The security tapes from the FBI office are inexplicably obscured by static whenever Adam is in frame. Raiding Fenton's house, the FBI finds the God's Hand list with Doyle's name, as well as his badge, among trophies taken from Fenton's other victims.

Later, Agent Hull visits Adam, who is revealed to be the sheriff of Thurman, to inform him of the findings. After shaking his hand, Adam tells Hull that he is a good man. As Agent Hull leaves, Adam's pregnant wife and deputy asks if everything is okay. He assures her that God's will has been done.

== Cast ==
- Bill Paxton as Dad Meiks, Fenton and Adam's widower father
- Matthew McConaughey as adult Adam Meiks (who impersonates Fenton Meiks part of the time)
  - Jeremy Sumpter as Adam as a child
- Matt O'Leary as Fenton Meiks as a child
  - Levi Kreis as adult Fenton Meiks
- Powers Boothe as FBI Agent Wesley Doyle
- Luke Askew as Sheriff Smalls
- Derk Cheetwood as Agent Griffin Hull
- Missy Crider as Becky Meiks (as Melissa Crider)
- Alan Davidson as Brad White
- Cynthia Ettinger as Cynthia Harbridge
- Vincent Chase as Edward March
- Gwen McGee as Operator
- Edmond Scott Ratliff as The Angel
- Rebecca Tilney as Teacher

== Production ==
In October 2000, it was announced that Lionsgate Films would fully finance Bill Paxton's directorial debut, Frailty. The film at one point had been slated to be produced by Atlantic Streamline, but Atlantic's unwillingness to handle domestic rights in addition to foreign rights resulted in the deal never materializing. At the time, Frailty marked Lionsgate's largest investment in an in-house production.

Tom Huckabee, longtime friend of Bill Paxton, was credited as a Frailty executive producer. However, in a 2019 interview, Huckabee said, "...my contribution was mostly as a catalyst. I'm credited as executive producer, which may make people think I had something to do with financing, which I didn't. Besides 'finding' the property and foisting it on Bill, I may have made small contributions to the script in the final stages of development, but I wouldn’t want to take anything away from the sole author, Brent Hanley, nor chief producers Paxton, David Kirschner, and Corey Sienega..."

== Reception ==
Review aggregator website Rotten Tomatoes reported that 76% of 154 critics gave the film a positive review, with an average rating of 6.9/10. The site's critics consensus states: "Creepy and disturbing, Frailty is well-crafted, low-key horror." Metacritic, which uses a weighted average, assigned the film a score of 64 out of 100, based on 32 critics, indicating "generally favorable" reviews. Audiences polled by CinemaScore gave the film an average grade of "B−" on an A+ to F scale.

Roger Ebert gave the film four out of four stars, noting that "Frailty is an extraordinary work, concealing in its depths not only unexpected story turns but also implications, hidden at first, that make it even deeper and more sad."

Bloody Disgusting gave the film an 'Honorable Mention' in their list of the twenty best horror films of the 2000s, calling the film an "underrated gem [...] a small-scale, thought-provoking horror film that deserves a second look."

=== Box office ===
Frailty grossed $13.1 million in the United States and Canada, and $4.3 million in other territories, for a worldwide total of $17.4 million.

== See also ==
- Binding of Isaac
