= 2009 Fangoria Chainsaw Awards =

Annual US horror film awards ceremony

16th Fangoria Chainsaw Awards
- Presented by: Fangoria
- Presented on: 2009
- Site: Los Angeles, California

Highlights
- Most awards: Hellboy II: The Golden Army (4)
- Most nominations: Hellboy II: The Golden Army (6)

The 2009 Fangoria Chainsaw Awards, presented by Fangoria magazine and Creation Entertainment, honored the best horror films of 2008.

== Winners and nominees ==
Best Wide Release	Best Limited Release
Hellboy II: The Golden Army − Directed by Guillermo del Toro; Cloverfield − Directed by Matt Reeves; Quarantine − Directed by John Erick Dowdle; The Ruins − Directed by Carter Smith; The Strangers − Directed by Bryan Bertino	Let the Right One In − Directed by Tomas Alfredson; Jack Brooks: Monster Slayer − Directed by Jon Knautz; Rogue − Directed by Greg McLean; Stuck − Directed by Stuart Gordon; The Living and the Dead − Directed by Simon Rumley
Best Actor	Best Actress
Ron Perlman − Hellboy II: The Golden Army as Hellboy; Kåre Hedebrant − Let the Right One In as Oskar; Leo Bill − The Living and the Dead as James Brocklebank; Marc Senter − The Lost as Ray Pye; Trevor Matthews − Jack Brooks: Monster Slayer as Jack Brooks and Forest Troll	Lina Leandersson − Let the Right One In as Eli; Alysson Paradis − Inside as Sarah Scarangella; Eliza Dushku − The Alphabet Killer as Megan Paige; Jess Weixler − Teeth as Dawn O'Keefe; Naomi Watts − Funny Games as Ann Farber
Best Supporting Actor	Best Supporting Actress
Doug Jones − Hellboy II: The Golden Army as Abe Sapien, Angel of Death and Chamberlain; A. J. Bowen − The Signal as Lewis Denton; Michael Pitt − Funny Games as Paul; Robert Englund − Jack Brooks: Monster Slayer as Professor Gordon Crowley; Vinnie Jones − The Midnight Meat Train as Mahogany	Béatrice Dalle − Inside as La Femme; Anna Walton − Hellboy II: The Golden Army as Princess Nuala; Jennifer Ellison − The Cottage as Tracey; Lauren Roy − The Chair as Anna Velayo; Lou Doillon − Sisters as Angelique Turner / Annabel Tristiana Turner
Best Screenplay	Best Score
Let the Right One In − John Ajvide Lindqvist; Hellboy II: The Golden Army − Guillermo del Toro; Jack Brooks: Monster Slayer − John Ainslie and Jon Knautz; Stuck − John Strysik; Teeth − Mitchell Lichtenstein	Let the Right One In − Johan Söderqvist; Jack Brooks: Monster Slayer − Ryan Shore; Cloverfield − Michael Giacchino; Teeth − Robert Miller; The Strangers − tomandandy
Best Make-Up/Creature FX	Worst Film
Hellboy II: The Golden Army − Mike Elizalde, David Martí, Montse Ribé and Cliff Wallace; Inside − Jacques-Olivier Molon; Jack Brooks: Monster Slayer − David Scott; Quarantine − Robert Hall; Trailer Park of Terror − Todd Tucker and Drac Studios	Prom Night − Directed by Nelson McCormick; Cloverfield − Directed by Matt Reeves; Saw V − Directed by David Hackl; The Happening − Directed by M. Night Shyamalan; Twilight − Directed by Catherine Hardwicke

== Fangoria Horror Hall of Fame ==
- Doug Jones
- Forrest J Ackerman
- Roger Corman
