= 2013 Fangoria Chainsaw Awards =

Annual US horror film awards ceremony

20th Fangoria Chainsaw Awards
- Presented by: Fangoria
- Presented on: 2013
- Site: Los Angeles, California

Highlights
- Most awards: The Cabin in the Woods (4)
- Most nominations: The Cabin in the Woods and The Grey (4)

The 2013 Fangoria Chainsaw Awards, presented by Fangoria magazine and Creation Entertainment, honored the best horror films of 2012.

== Winners and nominees ==
| Best Wide Release | Best Limited Release |
|---|---|
| The Cabin in the Woods − Directed by Drew Goddard; ParaNorman − Directed by Sam Fell and Chris Butler; Sinister − Directed by Scott Derrickson; The Grey − Directed by Joe Carnahan; The Woman in Black − Directed by James Watkins | Absentia − Directed by Mike Flanagan; A Lonely Place to Die − Directed by Julian Gilbey; Compliance − Directed by Craig Zobel; Kill List − Directed by Ben Wheatley; The Revenant − Directed by Kerry Prior |
| Best Actor | Best Actress |
| Liam Neeson − The Grey as John Ottway; Daniel Radcliffe − The Woman in Black as Arthur Kipps; Ethan Hawke − Sinister as Ellison Oswalt; Luis Tosar − Sleep Tight as César; Neil Maskell − Kill List as Jay | Elizabeth Olsen − Silent House as Sarah; AnnaLynne McCord − Excision as Pauline; Gretchen Lodge − Lovely Molly as Molly Reynolds; Jessica Biel − The Tall Man as Julia Denning; Robin McLeavy − The Loved Ones as Lola |
| Best Supporting Actor | Best Supporting Actress |
| Fran Kranz − The Cabin in the Woods as Marty Mikalski; Barry Bostwick − Some Guy Who Kills People as Sheriff Walt Fuller; Frank Grillo − The Grey as John Diaz; Michael Smiley − Kill List as Gal; Pat Healy − Compliance as The Caller | Traci Lords − Excision as Phyllis; Ashley Bell − The Day as Mary; Dreama Walker − Compliance as Becky; Samantha Ferris − The Tall Man as Tracy; Seo Young-hee − Bedevilled as Kim Bok-nam |
| Best Screenplay | Best Score |
| The Cabin in the Woods − Joss Whedon and Drew Goddard; Kill List − Ben Wheatley and Amy Jump; Rabies − Aharon Keshales and Navot Papushado; The Revenant − D. Kerry Prior; The Tall Man − Pascal Laugier | Sinister − Christopher Young; ParaNorman − Jon Brion; The Grey − Marc Streitenfeld; The Innkeepers − Jeff Grace; The Woman in Black − Marco Beltrami |
| Best Make-Up/Creature FX | Best International Film |
| The Cabin in the Woods − David LeRoy Anderson; Monster Brawl − Jason Derushie and Jeff Derushie; Silent Hill: Revelation − Paul Jones; The Divide − Todd Masters and Steven Kostanski; The Loved Ones − Justin Dix | Juan of the Dead − Directed by Alejandro Brugués (Cuba); Bedevilled − Directed by Jang Cheol-soo (South Korea); Cold Sweat − Directed by Adrian Garcia Bogliano (Argentina); Rabies − Directed by Aharon Keshales and Navot Papushado (Israel); Sleep Tight − Directed by Jaume Balagueró (Spain) |
Worst Film
Paranormal Activity 4 − Directed by Henry Joost and Ariel Schulman; Piranha 3DD − Directed by John Gulager; Smiley − Directed by Michael Gallagher; The Apparition − Directed by Todd Lincoln; The Devil Inside − Directed by William Brent Bell

== Fangoria Horror Hall of Fame ==
- Joss Whedon
- David Lynch
