= 2020 Fangoria Chainsaw Awards =

Annual US horror film awards ceremony

26th Fangoria Chainsaw Awards
- Presented by: Fangoria
- Announced on: January 6, 2020
- Presented on: February 7, 2020
- Hosted by: Shock Waves

Highlights
- Most awards: Midsommar (5)
- Most nominations: Doctor Sleep (7)

The 26th Fangoria Chainsaw Awards is an award ceremony presented for horror films that were released in 2019. The nominees were announced on January 6, 2020. The film Midsommar won four of its five nominations, including Best Wide Release, as well as the write-in poll of Best Kill. The Lighthouse took three awards, including Best Limited Release. Doctor Sleep only took one award out of its leading seven nominations.

== Winners and nominees ==
Best Wide Release	Best Limited Release
Midsommar – Directed by Ari Aster; Crawl – Directed by Alexandre Aja; Doctor Sleep – Directed by Mike Flanagan; It Chapter Two – Directed by Andy Muschietti; Ready or Not – Directed by Matt Bettinelli-Olpin and Tyler Gillett; Us – Directed by Jordan Peele	The Lighthouse – Directed by Robert Eggers; Bliss – Directed by Joe Begos; Daniel Isn't Real – Directed by Adam Egypt Mortimer; In Fabric – Directed by Peter Strickland; Nightmare Cinema – Directed by Alejandro Brugués, Joe Dante, Mick Garris, Ryūhei Kitamura and David Slade; Satanic Panic – Directed by Chelsea Stardust
Best International Movie	Best Streaming Premiere
Tigers Are Not Afraid – Directed by Issa López (Mexico); Hagazussa – Directed by Lukas Feigelfeld (Germany); Knife+Heart – Directed by Yann Gonzalez (France); Koko-di Koko-da – Directed by Johannes Nyholm (Sweden); Luz – Directed by Tilman Singer (Germany); One Cut of the Dead – Directed by Shin'ichirô Ueda (Japan)	The Perfection – Directed by Richard Shepard (Netflix); Eli – Directed by Ciarán Foy (Netflix); In the Tall Grass – Directed by Vincenzo Natali (Netflix); Little Monsters – Directed by Abe Forsythe (Hulu); The Nightshifter – Directed by Dennison Ramalho (Prime Video); Velvet Buzzsaw – Directed by Dan Gilroy (Netflix)
Best Director	Best First Feature
Ari Aster – Midsommar; Joe Begos – Bliss; Robert Eggers – The Lighthouse; Mike Flanagan – Doctor Sleep; Jordan Peele – Us; Shin'ichirô Ueda – One Cut of the Dead	Girl on the Third Floor – Directed by Travis Stevens; Braid – Directed by Mitzi Peirone; Darlin' – Directed by Pollyanna McIntosh; The Hole in the Ground – Directed by Lee Cronin; The Wind – Directed by Emma Tammi
Best Actor	Best Actress
Robert Pattinson – The Lighthouse as Ephraim Winslow; Winston Duke – Us as Gabriel "Gabe" Wilson / Abraham; Lief Edlund Johansson – Koko-di Koko-da; Ewan McGregor – Doctor Sleep as Danny Torrance; Daniel de Oliveria – The Nightshifter	Lupita Nyong’o – Us as Adelaide Wilson / Red; Kiersey Clemons – Sweetheart as Jenn; Caitlin Gerard – The Wind as – Elizabeth ‘Lizzy’ Macklin; Florence Pugh – Midsommar as Dani Ardor; Samara Weaving – Ready or Not as Grace Le Domas
Best Supporting Actor	Best Supporting Actress
Willem Dafoe – The Lighthouse as Thomas Wake; Alex Breaux – Depraved as Adam; Bill Hader – It Chapter Two as Richie Tozier; John Lithgow – Pet Sematary as Jud Crandall; Jackson Robert Scott – The Prodigy as Miles Blume	Rebecca Ferguson – Doctor Sleep as Rose the Hat; Kyliegh Curran – Doctor Sleep as Abra Stone; Zoey Deutch– Zombieland: Double Tap as Madison; Marianne Jean-Baptiste – In Fabric as Sheila; Ruby Modine – Satanic Panic as Judi Ross
Best Screenplay	Best Score
Midsommar – Ari Aster; Ready or Not – Guy Busick and Ryan Murphy; Doctor Sleep – Mike Flanagan; Satanic Panic – Grady Hendrix; Us – Jordan Peele; One Cut of the Dead – Shin'ichirô Ueda	Midsommar – The Haxan Cloak; In Fabric – Cavern of Anti-Matter; The Lighthouse – Mark Korven; Doctor Sleep – The Newton Brothers; Luz – Simon Waskow
Best Make-Up FX	Best Creature FX
The Dead Don't Die – Mike Marino; The Nightshifter– Britney Federline and Marcelo A.M.P.; Girl on the Third Floor – Dan Martin; Bliss – Josh and Sierra Russell; Depraved – Brian Spears and Peter Gerner	Scary Stories to Tell in the Dark – Spectral Motion; Boar – Steve Boyle; Child’s Play – Todd Masters; The Lighthouse - Adrien Morot; Sweetheart – Neville Page; Itsy Bitsy – Dan Rebert
Best Series	Best Kill (write-in category)
Stranger Things (Netflix); Are You Afraid of the Dark? (Nickelodeon); Castle Rock (Hulu); Creepshow (Shudder); Into the Dark (Hulu); Marianne (Netflix)	Christian and the Bear Suit on Fire – Midsommar
