= 2012 Fangoria Chainsaw Awards =

Annual US horror film awards ceremony

19th Fangoria Chainsaw Awards
- Presented by: Fangoria
- Presented on: 2012
- Site: Los Angeles, California

Highlights
- Most awards: Insidious (4)
- Most nominations: Black Death and Stake Land (6)

The 2012 Fangoria Chainsaw Awards, presented by Fangoria magazine and Creation Entertainment, honored the best horror films of 2011.

== Winners and nominees ==
Best Wide Release	Best Limited Release
Insidious − Directed by James Wan; Don't Be Afraid of the Dark − Directed by Troy Nixey; Drive Angry − Directed by Patrick Lussier; Final Destination 5 − Directed by Steven Quale; Fright Night − Directed by Craig Gillespie; Paranormal Activity 3 − Directed by Henry Joost and Ariel Schulman	Tucker & Dale vs. Evil − Directed by Eli Craig; Attack the Block − Directed by Joe Cornish; Black Death − Directed by Christopher Smith; Red White & Blue − Directed by Simon Rumley; Stake Land − Directed by Jim Mickle; The Human Centipede 2 (Full Sequence) − Directed by Tom Six
Best Actor	Best Actress
Antonio Banderas − The Skin I Live In as Dr. Robert Ledgard; Choi Min-sik − I Saw the Devil as Jang Kyung-chul; Nick Damici − Stake Land as Mister; Noah Taylor − Red White & Blue as Nate; Sean Bean − Black Death as Ulric; Tyler Labine − Tucker & Dale vs. Evil as Dale Dobson	Rose Byrne − Insidious as Renai Lambert; Amanda Fuller − Red White & Blue as Erica; Bailee Madison − Don't Be Afraid of the Dark as Sally Hurst; Josie Ho − Dream Home as Cheng Lai-sheung; Pollyanna McIntosh − The Woman as the Woman; Tabrett Bethell − The Clinic as Beth Church
Best Supporting Actor	Best Supporting Actress
Michael Parks − Red State as Pastor Abin Cooper; Alexander Skarsgård − Straw Dogs as Charlie Venner; Eddie Redmayne − Black Death as Osmund; Marc Senter − Red White & Blue as Franki; Timothy Spall − Wake Wood as Arthur; William Fichtner − Drive Angry as the Accountant	Lin Shaye − Insidious as Elise Rainier; Carice van Houten − Black Death as Langiva; Danielle Harris − Stake Land as Belle; Elena Anaya − The Skin I Live In as Vicente Guillén Piñeiro (voice) / Vera Cruz / Gal; Jodie Whittaker − Attack the Block as Samantha Adams; Katrina Bowden − Tucker & Dale vs. Evil as Allison
Best Screenplay	Best Score
Tucker & Dale vs. Evil − Eli Craig and Morgan Jurgenson; Attack the Block − Joe Cornish; Black Death − Dario Poloni; Red White & Blue − Simon Rumley; Stake Land − Nick Damici and Jim Mickle; The Skin I Live In − Pedro Almodóvar and Agustín Almodóvar	Insidious − Joseph Bishara; Attack the Block − Steven Price and Basement Jaxx; Black Death − Christian Henson; Contagion − Cliff Martinez; Stake Land − Jeff Grace; Wake Wood − Michael Convertino
Best Make-Up/Creature FX	Best International Film
Attack the Block − Mike Elizalde, Paul Hyett and Spectral Motion; ChromeSkull: Laid to Rest 2 − Robert Hall; Stake Land − Brian Spears and Pete Gerner; Sweatshop − Kristi Boul, Marcus Koch and Mike Oliver; The Dead − Max Van De Banks and Dan Rickard; The Woman − Robert Kurtzman and Anthony Pepe	Trollhunter − Directed by André Øvredal (Norway); A Serbian Film − Directed by Srđan Spasojević (Serbia); Amer − Directed by Hélène Cattet and Bruno Forzani (Belgium); I Saw the Devil − Directed by Kim Jee-woon (South Korea); Kidnapped − Directed by Miguel Ángel Vivas (Spain); The Skin I Live In − Directed by Pedro Almodóvar (Spain)
Worst Film
The Human Centipede 2 (Full Sequence) − Directed by Tom Six; Creature − Directed by Fred M. Andrews; Fright Night − Directed by Craig Gillespie; Paranormal Activity 3 − Directed by Henry Joost and Ariel Schulman; Shark Night − Directed by David R. Ellis

== Fangoria Horror Hall of Fame ==
- Danielle Harris
- S. William Hinzman
