= 2005 Fangoria Chainsaw Awards =

Annual US horror film awards ceremony

14th Fangoria Chainsaw Awards
- Presented by: Fangoria
- Presented on: May 24, 2005
- Site: Los Angeles, California

Highlights
- Most awards: Shaun of the Dead (4)
- Most nominations: Hellboy (7)

The 2005 Fangoria Chainsaw Awards, presented by Fangoria magazine and Creation Entertainment, honored the best horror films of 2004.

== Winners and nominees ==
Best Wide Release	Best Limited Release
Shaun of the Dead − Directed by Edgar Wright; Dawn of the Dead − Directed by Zack Snyder; Hellboy − Directed by Guillermo del Toro; Open Water − Directed by Chris Kentis; Saw − Directed by James Wan	Ginger Snaps 2: Unleashed − Directed by Brett Sullivan; Dead End − Directed by Jean-Baptiste Andrea and Fabrice Canepa; Lucky − Directed by Steve Cuden; My Little Eye − Directed by Marc Evans; The Machinist − Directed by Brad Anderson
Best Actor	Best Actress
Simon Pegg − Shaun of the Dead as Shaun; Christian Bale − The Machinist as Trevor Reznik; Desmond Harrington − Love Object as Kenneth Winslow; Johnny Depp − Secret Window as Morton "Mort" Rainey; Ron Perlman − Hellboy as Hellboy	Emily Perkins − Ginger Snaps 2: Unleashed as Brigitte Fitzgerald; Blanchard Ryan − Open Water as Susan Watkins; Bryce Dallas Howard − The Village as Ivy Elizabeth Walker; Jennifer Tilly − Seed of Chucky as Tiffany Valentine; Sarah Polley − Dawn of the Dead as Ana Clark
Best Supporting Actor	Best Supporting Actress
Nick Frost − Shaun of the Dead as Ed; Jake Weber − Dawn of the Dead as Michael Shaunessy; John Hurt − Hellboy as Trevor "Broom" Bruttenholm; Nicholas Turturro − The Hillside Strangler as Angelo Buono Jr.; Winston Rekert − Savage Island as Eliah Savage	Tatiana Maslany − Ginger Snaps 2: Unleashed as Ghost; Jennifer Jason Leigh − The Machinist as Stevie; Lin Shaye − Dead End as Laura Harrington; Melissa Sagemiller − Love Object as Lisa Bellmer; Selma Blair − Hellboy as Liz Sherman
Best Screenplay	Best Score
Shaun of the Dead − Simon Pegg and Edgar Wright; Ginger Snaps 2: Unleashed − Megan Martin; Hellboy − Guillermo del Toro; My Little Eye − David Hilton and James Watkins; The Machinist − Scott Kosar	The Grudge − Christopher Young; Hellboy − Marco Beltrami; Ginger Snaps 2: Unleashed − Kurt Swinghammer; Seed of Chucky − Pino Donaggio; The Machinist − Roque Baños
Best Make-Up/Creature FX	Worst Film
Hellboy − Chad Waters, Matt Rose and Mike Elizalde; Dawn of the Dead − David LeRoy Anderson; Shaun of the Dead − Jane Walker and Stuart Conran; Species III − Rob Hinderstein and Joel Harlow; Starship Troopers 2: Hero of the Federation − Tippett Studio	The Village − Directed by M. Night Shyamalan; Alien vs. Predator − Directed by Paul W. S. Anderson; Open Water − Directed by Chris Kentis; The Grudge − Directed by Takashi Shimizu; Van Helsing − Directed by Stephen Sommers

== Fangoria Horror Hall of Fame ==
- Emily Perkins
