= 2021 Fangoria Chainsaw Awards =

Annual US horror film awards ceremony

27th Fangoria Chainsaw Awards
- Presented by: Fangoria
- Announced on: January 20, 2021
- Presented on: April 18, 2021
- Hosted by: David Dastmalchian
- Preshow hosts: Angel Melanson
- Directed by: Xanthe Pajarillo

Highlights
- Most awards: The Invisible Man (5)
- Most nominations: His House (7)

The 27th Fangoria Chainsaw Awards is an award ceremony presented for horror films that were released in 2020. The nominees were announced on January 20, 2021. The film The Invisible Man won five of its five nominations, including Best Wide Release, as well as the write-in poll of Best Kill. Color Out Of Space and Possessor each took two awards. His House did not win any of its seven nominations. The ceremony was exclusively livestreamed for the first time on Shudder.

Kevin Smith, Keith David, and Jamie Lee Curtis were among the ceremony's presenters

== Winners and nominees ==
Best Wide Release	Best Limited Release
The Invisible Man – Directed by Leigh Whannell; Freaky – Directed by Christopher Landon; Gretel & Hansel – Directed by Oz Perkins; The Hunt – Directed by Craig Zobel; Underwater – Directed by William Eubank	Color Out of Space – Directed by Richard Stanley; The Dark and the Wicked – Directed by Bryan Bertino; Possessor – Directed by Brandon Cronenberg; Relic – Directed by Natalie Erika James; The Wolf of Snow Hollow – Directed by Jim Cummings
Best International Movie	Best Streaming Premiere
La Llorona – Directed by Jayro Bustamante (Guatemala); Bacurau – Directed by Kleber Mendonça Filho and Juliano Dornelles (Brazil); Blood Quantum – Directed by Jeff Barnaby (Canada); Impetigore – Directed by Joko Anwar (Indonesia); Sputnik – Directed by Egor Abramenko (Russia)	Host – Directed by Rob Savage (Shudder); Anything for Jackson – Directed by Justin G. Dyck (Shudder); The Beach House – Directed by Jeffrey A. Brown (Shudder); His House – Directed by Remi Weekes (Shudder); The Mortuary Collection – Directed by Ryan Spindell (Shudder); Run – Directed by Aneesh Chaganty (Hulu)
Best Director	Best First Feature
Leigh Whannell − The Invisible Man; Bryan Bertino − The Dark and the Wicked; Justin G. Dyck − Anything for Jackson; Romola Garai − Amulet; Natalie Erika James − Relic; Remi Weekes − His House	Come to Daddy – Directed by Ant Timpson; Amulet – Directed by Romola Garai; Dead Dicks – Directed by Chris Bavota; Extra Ordinary – Directed by Mike Ahern and Enda Loughman; Sea Fever – Directed by Neasa Hardiman
Best Lead Performance	Best Supporting Performance
Elisabeth Moss – The Invisible Man as Cecilia Kass; Jim Cummings – The Wolf of Snow Hollow as John Marshall; Sopé Dìrísù – His House as Bol Majur; Jeremy Gardner – After Midnight as Hank; Heston Horwin – Dead Dicks as Richie; Marin Ireland – The Dark and the Wicked as Louise Straker; Carla Juri – Amulet as Magda; Tamara Lawrance – Kindred as Charlotte; Emily Mortimer – Relic as Kay; Wunmi Mosaku – His House as Rial Majur; Andrea Riseborough – Possessor as Tasya Vos; Alec Secareanu – Amulet as Tomas; Vince Vaughn – Freaky as The Butcher	Clancy Brown – The Mortuary Collection as Montgomery Dark; Xander Berkeley – The Dark and the Wicked as Priest; Will Forte – Extra Ordinary as Christian Winter; Brea Grant – After Midnight as Abby; Udo Kier – Bacurau as Michael; Alice Krige – Gretel & Hansel as Witch; Stephen McHattie – Come to Daddy as Gordon; Robyn Nevin – Relic as Edna; Julie Oliver-Touchstone – The Dark and the Wicked as Virginia Straker; Misha Osherovich – Freaky as Josh Detmer; Vanessa Williams – Bad Hair as Zora
Best Screenplay	Best Score
The Invisible Man – Leigh Whannell; Bacurau – Kleber Mendonça Filho and Juliano Dornelles; Come to Daddy – Toby Harvard; Freaky – Michael Kennedy and Christopher Landon; His House – Remi Weekes	Possessor – Jim Williams; His House – Roque Baños; Gretel & Hansel – Rob; The Dark and the Wicked – Tom Schraeder; The Empty Man – Christopher Young and Lustmord
Best Make-Up FX	Best Creature FX
Possessor – Dan Martin; Freaky– Alterian Studios; The Mortuary Collection – Amalgamated Dynamics; Gretel & Hansel – Liz Byrne; Random Acts of Violence – Paul Jones	Color Out of Space – Dan Martin; Come Play – Jim Henson Studio; His House - David Martí and Montse Ribé; The Wretched – Erik Porn; Amulet – Cliff Wallace
Best Series	Best Non-Fiction Series or Miniseries
What We Do in the Shadows (FX); Dracula (Netflix); The Haunting of Bly Manor (Netflix); Helstrom (Hulu); Lovecraft Country (HBO)	The Last Drive-in with Joe Bob Briggs (Shudder); Blood & Flesh: The Reel Life and Ghastly Death of Al Adamson (Prime Video); The Boulet Brothers' Dragula: Resurrection (Shudder); Cursed Films (Shudder); Leap of Faith: William Friedkin on The Exorcist (Shudder); Scream, Queen! My Nightmare on Elm Street (Shudder)
Best Kill
Restaurant Scene – The Invisible Man; Head in the Chipper – Anything for Jackson; Bacamarte Head Explosion – Bacurau; Randall's Infection – The Beach House; Jethro's Metal Pick Death – Come to Daddy; Mr. Bernardi Sawed in Half – Freaky; Caroline's Death by Keyboard – Host; Exploding Penis Birth – The Mortuary Collection; John Parse's Death – Possessor; Edna's Transformation – Relic

== Presenters ==
- Keith David — presented Best Supporting Performance
- Andrea Subissati — presented Best Streaming Premiere
- Travis Stevens — presented Best First Feature
- Gory Cory — presented Best Series
- Biqtch Puddin' — presented Best Make-Up FX
- Issa López — presented Best International Movie
- Rebekah McKendry and Phil Nobile Jr. — presented Best Non-Fiction Series or Miniseries
- Emmanuel Osei-Kuffour Jr. — presented Best Score
- Doug Jones — presented Best Make-Up FX
- Corin Hardy — presented Best Limited Release
- Tananarive Due — presented Best Screenplay
- Kevin Smith — presented Best Director
- Jamie Lee Curtis — presented Best Lead Performance
- James Jude Courtney — presented Best Kill
- Gigi Saul Guerrero — presented Best Wide Release
