= 1996 Fangoria Chainsaw Awards =

Annual US horror film awards ceremony

5th Fangoria Chainsaw Awards
- Presented by: Fangoria
- Presented on: June 29, 1996
- Site: Los Angeles, California

Highlights
- Most awards: Seven (3)

The 1996 Fangoria Chainsaw Awards ceremony, presented by Fangoria magazine and Creation Entertainment, honored the best horror films of 1995 and took place on June 29, 1996, at the LAX Wyndham in Los Angeles, California. The ceremony was hosted by comedians Rick Overton and Scott LaRose who had hosted the ceremony the previous year.

== Ceremony ==
The event was held as part of Fangoria's annual Weekend of Horrors convention, in partnership with Creation Entertainment. Attendees at the convention included special effects artist Gabe Bartalos, Ken Foree, Betsy Palmer, and Dick Warlock.

== Winners and nominees ==
Best Wide Release	Best Limited Release
Seven − Directed by Alex Proyas	Castle Freak − Directed by Stuart Gordon
Best Actor	Best Actress
Christopher Walken − The Prophecy as Gabriel	Jada Pinkett − Tales from the Crypt: Demon Knight as Jeryline
Best Supporting Actor	Best Supporting Actress
Kevin Spacey − Seven as John Doe	Virginia Madsen − The Prophecy as Katherine
Best Screenplay	Best Score
Seven − Andrew Kevin Walker	Lord of Illusions − Simon Boswell
Best Make-Up/Creature FX	Worst Film
Interview with the Vampire (film) − Stan Winston	Halloween: The Curse of Michael Myers − Directed by Joe Chappelle

== Fangoria Horror Hall of Fame ==
- Christopher Lee
- Christopher Walken

== Presenters ==
- David Arnold – presenter of Best Score
- Stephen Geoffreys and Virginya Keehne – presenters of Best Supporting Actor and Best Supporting Actress
- Larry Cohen – presenter of Best Screenplay
- Chris Nelson – presenter of Best Make-Up/Creature FX
- Johnny Legend – presenter of Worst Film
- Vivian Schilling – presenter of Best Actress
- Jeffrey Combs – presenter of Best Actor
- William Lustig – presenter of Best Limited Release
- Mick Garris – presenter of Best Wide Release
- Rick Overton and Scott LaRose – presenters of Fangoria Horror Hall of Fame
