= 2016 Fangoria Chainsaw Awards =

Annual US horror film awards ceremony

23rd Fangoria Chainsaw Awards
- Presented by: Fangoria
- Presented on: 2016
- Site: Los Angeles, California

Highlights
- Most awards: It Follows (3)
- Most nominations: We Are Still Here (5)

The 2016 Fangoria Chainsaw Awards, presented by Fangoria magazine and Creation Entertainment, honored the best horror films of 2015.

== Winners and nominees ==
Best Wide Release	Best Limited Release
It Follows − Directed by David Robert Mitchell; Crimson Peak − Directed by Guillermo del Toro; Krampus − Directed by Michael Dougherty; The Gift − Directed by Joel Edgerton; The Visit − Directed by M. Night Shyamalan	What We Do in the Shadows − Directed by Jemaine Clement and Taika Waititi; Anguish − Directed by Sonny Mallhi; Some Kind of Hate − Directed by Adam Egypt Mortimer; The Final Girls − Directed by Todd Strauss-Schulson; We Are Still Here − Directed by Ted Geoghegan
Best Actor	Best Actress
Kurt Russell − Bone Tomahawk as Sheriff Franklin Hunt; Henry Rollins − He Never Died as Jack / Cay'in (Cain) / Vlad the Impaler; Lou Taylor Pucci − Spring as Evan Russell; Mark Duplass − Creep as Josef; Tom Hiddleston − Crimson Peak as Thomas Sharpe	Maika Monroe − It Follows as Jaime "Jay" Height; Abigail Breslin − Maggie as Marguerite “Maggie” Vogel; Barbara Crampton − We Are Still Here as Anne Sacchetti; Ryan Simpkins − Anguish as Tess; Susanne Wuest − Goodnight Mommy as Mother
Best Supporting Actor	Best Supporting Actress
Joel Edgerton − The Gift as Gordo; Larry Fessenden − We Are Still Here as Jacob Lewis; Pit Bukowski − Der Samurai as Der Samurai; Rainn Wilson − The Boy as William Colby; Richard Jenkins − Bone Tomahawk as Deputy Chicory	Jessica Chastain − Crimson Peak as Lucille Sharpe; Deanna Dunagan − The Visit as Marja Bella Jamison; Kate Greenhouse − He Never Died as Cara; Krista Stadler − Krampusas 'Omi'; Malin Akerman − The Final Girls as Nancy / Amanda Cartwright
Best Screenplay	Best Score
What We Do in the Shadows − Jemaine Clement and Taika Waititi; Anguish − Sonny Mallhi; The Final Girls − M. A. Fortin and Joshua John Miller; The Gift − Joel Edgerton; The Midnight Swim − Sarah Adina Smith	It Follows − Disasterpeace; Crimson Peak − Fernando Velázquez; The Boy − Volker Bertelmann; The Editor − Claudio Simonetti, Carpenter Brut, Brian Wiacek and Jeremy Gillespie; We Are Still Here − Wojciech Golczewski
Best Make-Up/Creature FX	Best International Film
Krampus − Wētā Workshop; Bone Tomahawk − Hugo Villasenor; Deathgasm − Tim Wells, Roger Murray and Main Reactor; The Hallow − John Nolan; We Are Still Here − Marcus Koch	Goodnight Mommy − Directed by Veronika Franz and Severin Fiala (Austria); Alleluia − Directed by Fabrice Du Welz (Belgium); Cub − Directed by Jonas Govaerts (Belgium); Der Samurai − Directed by Till Kleinert (Germany); When Animals Dream − Directed by Jonas Alexander Arnby (Denmark)
Worst Film
Poltergeist − Directed by Gil Kenan; Paranormal Activity: The Ghost Dimension − Directed by Gregory Plotkin; The Human Centipede 3 (Final Sequence) − Directed by Tom Six; The Gallows − Directed by Chris Lofing and Travis Cluff; The Visit − Directed by M. Night Shyamalan
Best TV Series	Best TV Make-Up/Creature FX
Ash vs Evil Dead (Starz); Hannibal (NBC); Penny Dreadful (Showtime); Salem (WGN America); The Walking Dead (AMC)	The Walking Dead − Greg Nicotero and Howard Berger; American Horror Story: Hotel − Eryn Krueger Mekash and David LeRoy Anderson; Hannibal − François Dagenais; Salem − Matthew W. Mungle and Clinton Wayne; The Strain − Steve Newburn and Sean Sansom
Best TV Actor	Best TV Actress
Bruce Campbell − Ash vs Evil Dead as Ash Williams; Hugh Dancy − Hannibal as Will Graham; Josh Hartnett − Penny Dreadful as Ethan Chandler; Mads Mikkelsen − Hannibal as Dr. Hannibal Lecter; Matt Ryan − Constantine as John Constantine	Eva Green − Penny Dreadful as Vanessa Ives; Caroline Dhavernas − Hannibal as Dr. Alana Bloom; Janet Montgomery − Salem as Mary Walcott / Mary Sibley; Lady Gaga − American Horror Story: Hotel as Elizabeth Johnson / The Countess; Vera Farmiga − Bates Motel as Norma Louise Bates
Best TV Supporting Actor	Best TV Supporting Actress
Richard Armitage − Hannibal as Francis Dolarhyde; Evan Peters − American Horror Story: Hotel as James Patrick March; Lennie James − The Walking Dead as Morgan Jones; Rory Kinnear − Penny Dreadful as the Creature; Seth Gabel − Salem as Cotton Mather	Gillian Anderson − Hannibal as Dr. Bedelia Du Maurier; Billie Piper − Penny Dreadful as Brona Croft / Lily Frankenstein; Dana DeLorenzo − Ash vs Evil Dead as Kelly Maxwell / Sorceress Kaya; Jamie Lee Curtis − Scream Queens as Dean Cathy Munsch; Lucy Lawless − Salem as Countess Palatine Ingrid von Marburg

== Fangoria Horror Hall of Fame ==
- Kurt Russell
- Barbara Crampton
