= 1999 Fangoria Chainsaw Awards =

Annual US horror film awards ceremony

8th Fangoria Chainsaw Awards
- Presented by: Fangoria
- Presented on: 1999
- Site: Los Angeles, California

Highlights
- Most awards: Vampires (3)
- Most nominations: Dark City (5)

The 1999 Fangoria Chainsaw Awards, presented by Fangoria magazine and Creation Entertainment, honored the best horror films of 1998.

== Winners and nominees ==
| Best Wide Release | Best Limited Release |
|---|---|
| Dark City − Directed by Alex Proyas; Apt Pupil − Directed by Bryan Singer; Bride of Chucky − Directed by Ronny Yu; Halloween H20: 20 Years Later − Directed by Steve Miner; Vampires − Directed by John Carpenter | The Night Flier − Directed by Mark Pavia; Cube − Directed by Vincenzo Natali; Funny Games − Directed by Michael Haneke; Shadow Builder − Directed by Jamie Dixon; The Ugly − Directed by Scott Reynolds |
| Best Actor | Best Actress |
| James Woods − Vampires as John "Jack" Crow; Ian McKellen − Apt Pupil as Kurt Dussander / Arthur Denker; Miguel Ferrer − The Night Flier as Richard Dees; Paolo Rotondo − The Ugly as Simon Cartwright; Wesley Snipes − Blade as Eric Brooks / Blade | Jamie Lee Curtis − Halloween H20: 20 Years Later as Laurie Strode / Keri Tate; Alicia Witt − Urban Legend as Natalie; Gillian Anderson − The X Files as Special Agent Dana Scully; Jennifer Tilly − Bride of Chucky as Tiffany Valentine; Rebecca Hobbs − The Ugly as Dr. Karen Shumaker |
| Best Supporting Actor | Best Supporting Actress |
| Udo Kier − Blade as Gitano Dragonetti; Liev Schreiber − Phantoms as Deputy Stu Wargle; Richard O'Brien − Dark City as Mr. Hand; Rich Komenich − Henry: Portrait of a Serial Killer, Part II as Kai; Robert Patrick − The Faculty as Coach Willis | Sheryl Lee − Vampires as Katrina; Anne Heche − Psycho as Marion Crane; Brittany Murphy − The Prophecy II as Isabelle "Izzy"; Clea DuVall − The Faculty as Stokely Mitchell; Jennifer Connelly − Dark City as Emma Murdoch / Anna |
| Best Screenplay | Best Score |
| Dark City − David S. Goyer, Lem Dobbs and Alex Proyas; Apt Pupil − Brandon Boyce; Bride of Chucky − Don Mancini; Funny Games − Michael Haneke; Vampires − Don Jakoby | Vampires − John Carpenter; Apt Pupil − John Ottman; Dark City − Trevor Jones; Disturbing Behavior − Mark Snow; Fallen − Tan Dun |
| Best Make-Up/Creature FX | Worst Film |
| Bride of Chucky − Kevin Yagher; Blade − Greg Cannom; Species II − Steve Johnson; Strangeland − Michael Burnett; The Faculty − KNB EFX Group | I Still Know What You Did Last Summer − Directed by Danny Cannon; Godzilla − Directed by Roland Emmerich |

== Fangoria Horror Hall of Fame ==
- Brad Dourif
- Dick Miller
