= 2006 Fangoria Chainsaw Awards =

Annual US horror film awards ceremony

15th Fangoria Chainsaw Awards
- Presented by: Fangoria
- Presented on: May 23, 2006
- Site: Los Angeles, California

Highlights
- Most awards: The Devil's Rejects (4)
- Most nominations: The Devil's Rejects (6)

The 2006 Fangoria Chainsaw Awards, presented by Fangoria magazine and Creation Entertainment, honored the best horror films of 2005.

== Winners and nominees ==
Best Wide Release	Best Limited Release
The Devil's Rejects − Directed by Rob Zombie; High Tension − Directed by Alexandre Aja; Land of the Dead − Directed by George A. Romero; The Exorcism of Emily Rose − Directed by Scott Derrickson; Wolf Creek − Directed by Greg McLean	Toolbox Murders − Directed by Tobe Hooper; Dead Birds − Directed by Alex Turner; Satan's Little Helper − Directed by Jeff Lieberman; Shallow Ground − Directed by Sheldon Wilson; The Nameless − Directed by Jaume Balagueró
Best Actor	Best Actress
Sid Haig − The Devil's Rejects as Captain Spaulding / "Cutter"; John Jarratt − Wolf Creek as Mick Taylor; John Leguizamo − Land of the Dead as Cholo DeMora; John Turturro − Fear X as Harry; Stellan Skarsgård − Dominion: Prequel to the Exorcist as Father Lankester Merrin	Cécile de France − High Tension as Marie; Angela Bettis − Toolbox Murders as Nell Barrows; Dakota Fanning − Hide and Seek as Emily Callaway; Jennifer Connelly − Dark Water as Dahlia; Kari Wuhrer − Hellraiser: Deader as Amy Klein
Best Supporting Actor	Best Supporting Actress
William Forsythe − The Devil's Rejects as Sheriff John Quincey Wydell; John C. Reilly − Dark Water as Mr. Murray; Robert Joy − Land of the Dead as Charlie Houk; Ted Raimi − Man with the Screaming Brain as Pavel; Tobin Bell − Saw II as Jigsaw / John Kramer	Leslie Easterbrook − The Devil's Rejects as Mother Firefly; Amanda Plummer − Satan's Little Helper as Merrill Whooly; Gena Rowlands − The Skeleton Key as Violet Devereaux; Jennifer Carpenter − The Exorcism of Emily Rose as Emily Rose; Tilda Swinton − Constantine as Gabriel
Best Screenplay	Best Score
The Devil's Rejects − Rob Zombie; Dark Water − Rafael Yglesias; Land of the Dead − George A. Romero; Satan's Little Helper − Jeff Lieberman; Wolf Creek − Greg McLean	The Devil's Rejects − Tyler Bates; Dark Water − Angelo Badalamenti; Dead Birds − Peter Lopez; The Exorcism of Emily Rose − Christopher Young; Wolf Creek − François Tétaz
Best Make-Up/Creature FX	Worst Film
Land of the Dead − Greg Nicotero and Howard Berger; Dead Birds − Robert Hall and Almost Human; High Tension − Giannetto De Rossi; Shallow Ground − Patrick Magee; Toolbox Murders − Dean Jones and Starr Jones	The Fog − Directed by Rupert Wainwright

== Fangoria Horror Hall of Fame ==
- KNB EFX Group
- Eli Roth
