= 1997 Fangoria Chainsaw Awards =

Annual US horror film awards ceremony

6th Fangoria Chainsaw Awards
- Presented by: Fangoria
- Presented on: 1997
- Site: Los Angeles, California

Highlights
- Most awards: Scream (4)
- Most nominations: The Frighteners (8)

The 1997 Fangoria Chainsaw Awards, presented by Fangoria magazine and Creation Entertainment, honored the best horror films of 1996.

== Ceremony ==
There was no ceremony to commemorate the occasion, as the annual Los Angeles Weekend of Horrors event was cancelled (originally scheduled for May 31, 1997 at the LAX Wyndham).

== Winners and nominees ==
Best Wide Release	Best Limited Release
Scream − Directed by Wes Craven; From Dusk till Dawn − Directed by Robert Rodriguez; The Frighteners − Directed by Peter Jackson; The Craft − Directed by Andrew Fleming	Cemetery Man − Directed by Michele Soavi; Tremors 2: Aftershocks − Directed by S. S. Wilson; The Cold Light of Day − Directed by Rudolf van den Berg; The Dentist − Directed by Brian Yuzna; Necronomicon − Directed by Brian Yuzna, Christophe Gans, and Shusuke Kaneko
Best Actor	Best Actress
George Clooney − From Dusk till Dawn as Seth Gecko; Corbin Benson − The Dentist as Dr. Alan Feinstone; Rupert Everett − Cemetery Man as Francesco Dellamorte; Michael J. Fox − The Frighteners as Frank Bannister	Neve Campbell − Scream as Sidney Prescott; Fairuza Balk − The Craft as Nancy Downs; Trini Alvarado − The Frighteners as Lucy Lynskey; Lynsey Baxter − The Cold Light of Day as Milena Tatour; Robin Tunney − The Craft as Sarah Bailey
Best Supporting Actor	Best Supporting Actress
Jeffrey Combs − The Frighteners as Milton Dammers; Skeet Ulrich − Scream as Billy Loomis; Tom Savini − From Dusk till Dawn as Sex Machine; Francois Hadji-Lazaro − Cemetery Man as Gnaghi; Simon Cadell − The Cold Light of Day as Vladimir Kozant	Drew Barrymore − Scream as Casey Becker; Dee Wallace − The Frighteners as Patricia Bradley; Anna Falchi − Cemetery Man as She; Kate Beckinsale − Haunted as Christina Mariell; Rachel True − The Craft as Rochelle Zimmerman
Best Screenplay	Best Score
Scream − Kevin Williamson; From Dusk till Dawn − Quentin Tarantino; Cemetery Man − Gianni Romali; The Frighteners − Peter Jackson and Fran Walsh; The Craft − Peter Filardi and Andrew Fleming	The Frighteners − Danny Elfman; From Dusk till Dawn − Graeme Revell; Thinner − Daniel Licht; The Island of Dr. Moreau − Gary Chang; Cemetery Man − Manuel de Sica
Best Make-Up/Creature FX	Worst Film
From Dusk till Dawn − KNB EFX Group (Robert Kurtzman, Greg Nicotero, and Howard Berger); The Frighteners − Rick Baker and Richard Taylor; Night of the Scarecrow − David Miller; Cemetery Man − Sergio Stivalenti; Hellraiser: Bloodline − Gary J. Tunnicliffe and Kevin Yagher	The Crow: City of Angels − Directed by Tim Pope

== Fangoria Horror Hall of Fame ==
- Jamie Lee Curtis
- Stuart Gordon
