= 2011 Fangoria Chainsaw Awards =

Awards that honored the best horror films of 2010

18th Fangoria Chainsaw Awards
- Presented by: Fangoria
- Presented on: 2011
- Site: Los Angeles, California

Highlights
- Most awards: Black Swan (5)
- Most nominations: Black Swan (6)

The 2011 Fangoria Chainsaw Awards, presented by Fangoria magazine and Creation Entertainment, honored the best horror films of 2010.

== Winners and nominees ==
Best Wide Release	Best Limited Release
Black Swan − Directed by Darren Aronofsky; Let Me In − Directed by Matt Reeves; Splice − Directed by Vincenzo Natali; The Crazies − Directed by Breck Eisner; The Last Exorcism − Directed by Daniel Stamm	The Human Centipede (First Sequence) − Directed by Tom Six; Antichrist − Directed by Lars von Trier; Buried − Directed by Rodrigo Cortés; Monsters − Directed by Gareth Edwards; Rec 2 − Directed by Jaume Balagueró and Paco Plaza
Best Actor	Best Actress
Ryan Reynolds − Buried as Paul Conroy; James LeGros − Bitter Feast as Peter Gray; Kodi Smit-McPhee − Let Me In as Owen; Leonardo DiCaprio − Shutter Island as Edward "Teddy" Daniels / Andrew Laeddis; Patrick Fabian − The Last Exorcism as Cotton Marcus	Natalie Portman − Black Swan as Nina Sayers; Charlotte Gainsbourg − Antichrist as She; Chloë Grace Moretz − Let Me In as Abby; Melissa George − Triangle as Jess; Sarah Polley − Splice as Elsa Kast
Best Supporting Actor	Best Supporting Actress
Richard Jenkins − Let Me In as Thomas; Jackie Earle Haley − Shutter Island as George Noyce; Joe Anderson − The Crazies as Russell; Joshua Leonard − Bitter Feast as J.T. Franks; Vincent Cassel − Black Swan as Thomas Leroy	Barbara Hershey − Black Swan as Erica Sayers; Ashley Bell − The Last Exorcism as Nell Margaret Sweetzer; Delphine Chanéac − Splice as Dren; Jessica Paré − Suck as Jennifer; Jodelle Ferland − Case 39 as Lillith "Lily" Sullivan
Best Screenplay	Best Score
Black Swan − Andres Heinz, Mark Heyman and John J. McLaughlin; Buried − Chris Sparling; I Sell the Dead − Glenn McQuaid; Rec 2 − Jaume Balagueró, Manu Díaz and Paco Plaza; Triangle − Christopher Smith	Black Swan − Clint Mansell; Buried − Víctor Reyes; I Sell the Dead − Jeff Grace; Splice − Cyrille Aufort; Triangle − Christian Henson
Best Make-Up/Creature FX	Worst Film
Daybreakers − Steve Boyle; Black Swan − Mike Marino; I Sell the Dead − Brian Spears and Pete Gerner; Splice − C.O.R.E. Digital Pictures and KNB EFX Group; The Crazies − Robert Hall	A Nightmare on Elm Street − Directed by Samuel Bayer; My Soul to Take − Directed by Wes Craven; Splice − Directed by Vincenzo Natali; The Human Centipede (First Sequence) − Directed by Tom Six; Vampires Suck − Directed by Jason Friedberg and Aaron Seltzer

== Fangoria Horror Hall of Fame ==
- Richard Matheson
- Larry Fessenden
