= 1998 Fangoria Chainsaw Awards =

Annual US horror film awards ceremony

7th Fangoria Chainsaw Awards
- Presented by: Fangoria
- Presented on: 1998
- Site: Los Angeles, California

Highlights
- Most awards: Vampires (3)
- Most nominations: Dark City (5)

The 1998 Fangoria Chainsaw Awards, presented by Fangoria magazine and Creation Entertainment, honored the best horror films of 1997.

== Winners and nominees ==
Best Wide Release	Best Limited Release
Scream 2 − Directed by Wes Craven; Alien Resurrection − Directed by Jean-Pierre Jeunet; The Devil's Advocate − Directed by Taylor Hackford	Lost Highway − Directed by David Lynch; Crash − Directed by David Cronenberg
Best Actor	Best Actress
Al Pacino − The Devil's Advocate as John Milton / Satan; Andrew Divoff − Wishmaster as The Djinn / Nathaniel Demerest; Sam Neill − Event Horizon	Sigourney Weaver − Alien Resurrection as Ellen Ripley; Neve Campbell − Scream 2 as Sidney Prescott
Best Supporting Actor	Best Supporting Actress
Robert Blake − Lost Highway as The Mystery Man; Liev Schreiber − Scream 2 as Cotton Weary as The Violator; John Leguizamo − Spawn	Courteney Cox − Scream 2 as Gale Weathers; Charlize Theron − The Devil's Advocate as Mary Ann Lomax
Best Screenplay	Best Score
Scream 2 − Kevin Williamson; Lost Highway − David Lynch and Barry Gifford	Lost Highway − Angelo Badalamenti; Mimic − Marco Beltrami
Best Make-Up/Creature FX	Worst Film
Starship Troopers − Phil Tippett and Kevin Yagher; Alien Resurrection − Alec Gillis and Tom Woodruff Jr.	Spawn − Directed by Mark A.Z. Dippé; Anaconda − Directed by Luis Llosa
Chick You Don't Wanna Mess With
Jennifer Love Hewitt − I Know What You Did Last Summer

== Fangoria Horror Hall of Fame ==
- Kevin Williamson
- Sigourney Weaver
- Lucio Fulci
