= 2002 Fangoria Chainsaw Awards =

Annual US horror film awards ceremony

11th Fangoria Chainsaw Awards
- Presented by: Fangoria
- Presented on: 2002
- Site: Los Angeles, California

Highlights
- Most awards: Hannibal and Jeepers Creepers (2)
- Most nominations: Hannibal (8)

The 2002 Fangoria Chainsaw Awards, presented by Fangoria magazine and Creation Entertainment, honored the best horror films of 2001.

== Winners and nominees ==
Best Wide Release	Best Limited Release
Jeepers Creepers − Directed by Victor Salva; From Hell − Directed by Hughes brothers; Hannibal − Directed by Ridley Scott; Joy Ride − Directed by John Dahl; The Others − Directed by Alejandro Amenábar	Ginger Snaps − Directed by John Fawcett; Audition − Directed by Takashi Miike; Session 9 − Directed by Brad Anderson; The Convent − Directed by Mike Mendez; The Devil's Backbone − Directed by Guillermo del Toro
Best Actor	Best Actress
Anthony Hopkins − Hannibal as Dr. Hannibal Lecter; Johnny Depp − From Hell as Inspector Frederick Abberline; Jeff Daniels − Chasing Sleep as Ed Saxon; Peter Mullan − Session 9 as Gordon Fleming; Steve Railsback − Ed Gein as Ed Gein	Nicole Kidman − The Others as Grace Stewart; Emily Perkins − Ginger Snaps as Brigitte Fitzgerald; Katharine Isabelle − Ginger Snaps as Ginger Fitzgerald; Julianne Moore − Hannibal as Clarice Starling; Eihi Shiina − Audition as Asami Yamazaki
Best Supporting Actor	Best Supporting Actress
Jonathan Breck − Jeepers Creepers as the Creeper; Ian Holm − From Hell as Sir William Gull; Giancarlo Giannini − Hannibal as Chief Inspector Rinaldo Pazzi; Federico Luppi − The Devil's Backbone as Dr. Casares; Muse Watson − If I Die Before I Wake as Daryl	Adrienne Barbeau − The Convent as Adult Christine; Mimi Rogers − Ginger Snaps as Pamela Fitzgerald; Emily Bergl − Chasing Sleep as Sadie; Fionnula Flanagan − The Others as Bertha Mills; Patricia Velásquez − The Mummy Returns as Meela Nais / Anck-su-namun
Best Screenplay	Best Score
Ginger Snaps − Karen Walton; Hannibal − Steven Zaillian and David Mamet; Audition − Daisuke Tengan; The Convent − Chaton Anderson; The Devil's Backbone − Guillermo del Toro, Antonio Trashorras and David Muñoz	Hannibal − Hans Zimmer; From Hell − Trevor Jones; The Devil's Backbone − Javier Navarrete; Ginger Snaps − Mike Shields; Joy Ride − Marco Beltrami
Best Make-Up/Creature FX	Worst Film
Thirteen Ghosts − KNB EFX Group; Jeepers Creepers − Brian Penikas; Ginger Snaps − Paul Jones; Hannibal − Greg Cannom; Route 666 − Norman Cabrera	Valentine − Directed by Jamie Blanks; Hannibal − Directed by Ridley Scott; The Mummy Returns − Directed by Stephen Sommers; Thirteen Ghosts − Directed by Steve Beck

== Fangoria Horror Hall of Fame ==
- Mario Bava
- Guillermo del Toro
