= 1994 Fangoria Chainsaw Awards =

Annual US horror film awards ceremony

3rd Fangoria Chainsaw Awards
- Date: Saturday, June 11, 1994
- Site: Hilton Los Angeles Airport, Los Angeles, California
- Hosted by: Linnea Quigley

Highlights
- Best Picture: Army of Darkness

The 1994 Fangoria Chainsaw Awards ceremony, presented by Fangoria magazine and Creation Entertainment, honored the best horror films of 1993 and took place on June 11, 1994, at the Hilton LAX in Los Angeles, California. The ceremony was hosted by Linnea Quigley.

== Ceremony ==
The event was held as part of Fangoria's annual Weekend of Horrors convention, in partnership with Creation Entertainment. Hosted by B-movie scream queen Linnea Quigley, the 1994 event was notable for featuring an appearance by Jack Nicholson, promoting his upcoming film Wolf. Also present at the convention were Clive Barker, Howard Berger, Wes Craven, Frank Darabont, Tony Gardner, Peter Jackson, Sam Raimi, Scott Spiegel, Kevin Yagher.

== Winners and nominees ==
Best Wide Release	Best Limited Release
Army of Darkness − Directed by Sam Raimi; The Nightmare Before Christmas − Directed by Tim Burton; Jason Goes to Hell: The Final Friday − Directed by Adam Marcus; The Dark Half − Directed by George A. Romero; Jurassic Park − Directed by Steven Spielberg	Dead Alive − Directed by Peter Jackson; Ticks − Directed by Tony Randel; Dust Devil − Directed by Richard Stanley; Freaked − Directed by Tom Stern and Alex Winter; Return of the Living Dead 3 − Directed by Brian Yuzna
Best Actor	Best Actress
Bruce Campbell − Army of Darkness as Ashley "Ash" J. Williams and "Evil Ash"; Robert John Burke − Dust Devil as Dust Devil; Lance Henriksen − Man's Best Friend as Dr. Robert Jarret; Timothy Hutton − The Dark Half as Thad Beaumont / George Stark; Max von Sydow − Needful Things as Leland Gaunt	Melinda Clarke − Return of the Living Dead III as Julie Walker; Chelsea Field − Dust Devil as Wendy Robinson; Kari Keegan − Jason Goes to Hell: The Final Friday as Jessica Kimble; Amy Madigan − The Dark Half as Liz Beaumont; Alicia Silverstone − The Crush as Adrian / Darian Forrester
Best Supporting Actor	Best Supporting Actress
Jeff Goldblum − Jurassic Park as Ian Malcolm; Michael Rooker − The Dark Half as Sheriff Alan Pangborn; Ian Watkin − Dead Alive as Uncle Les; Steven Williams − Jason Goes to Hell: The Final Friday as Creighton Duke; Randy Quaid − Freaked as Elijah C. Skuggs	Embeth Davidtz − Army of Darkness as Sheila; Julie Harris − The Dark Half as Reggie Delesseps; Elizabeth Moody − Dead Alive as Vera Cosgrove; Amanda Plummer − Needful Things as Netitia "Nettie" Cobb; Megan Ward − Freaked as Julie
Best Screenplay	Best Score
The Dark Half − George A. Romero; Freaked − Tom Stern, Alex Winter, and Tim Burns; The Ambulance − Larry Cohen; Jason Goes to Hell: The Final Friday − Dean Lorey and Jay Huguely; Dead Alive − Stephen Sinclair, Frances Walsh, and Peter Jackson	Army of Darkness − Danny Elfman and Joseph LoDuca; The Dark Half − Simon Boxwell; Needful Things − Patrick Doyle; Freaked − Kevin Kiner; The Dark Half − Christopher Young
Best Make-Up/Creature FX	Worst Film
Army of Darkness − KNB EFX Group (Greg Nicotero, Robert Kurtzman, Howard Berger) and Tony Gardner; Leprechaun − Gabe Bartalos; The Dark Half − Everett Burrell and John Vulich; Dead Alive − Bob McCarron, Marjory Hamlin, Richard Taylor; Freaked − Screaming Mad George, Steve Johnson, Tony Gardner	Leprechaun − Directed by Mark Jones

== Fangoria Horror Hall of Fame ==
- Peter Jackson
- Angus Scrimm

== Presenters ==
- Richard Band — presenter for Best Score
- Clint Howard and Cynthia Garris — presenter for Best Supporting Actor and Best Supporting Actress
- Brent V. Friedman — presenter for Best Screenplay
- Mike Deak — presenter for Best Make-Up/Creature FX
- Johnny Legend — presenter for Worst Film
- Beverly Garland — presenter for Best Actress
- Ted Raimi — presenter for Best Actor
- C. Courtney Joyner — presenter for Best Limited Release
- Anthony Hickox — presenter for Best Wide Release
- Reggie Bannister — presenter for Fangoria Horror Hall of Fame
