= Bubba Ho-Tep =

- Theatrical release poster
- Directed by: Don Coscarelli
- Screenplay by: Don Coscarelli
- Based on: Bubba Ho-Tep by Joe R. Lansdale
- Produced by: Don Coscarelli; Jason R. Savage
- Starring: Bruce Campbell; Ossie Davis; Ella Joyce; Heidi Marnhout; Bob Ivy
- Narrated by: André Sogliuzzo
- Cinematography: Adam Janeiro
- Edited by: Scott J. Gill; Donald Milne
- Music by: Brian Tyler
- Production company: Silver Sphere Corporation
- Distributed by: Vitagraph Films
- Release date: September 19, 2002
- Running time: 92 minutes
- Country: United States
- Language: English
- Budget: $1 million
- Box office: $1.2 million

Bubba Ho-Tep is a 2002 American comedy horror film written, co-produced and directed by Don Coscarelli. It stars Bruce Campbell as Sebastian Haff, a man residing in a nursing home who claims to be the real Elvis Presley. The film also stars Ossie Davis as Jack, a black man who claims to be John F. "Jack" Kennedy, explaining that he was patched up after the assassination, dyed black, and abandoned.

It is based on the novella of the same title by Joe R. Lansdale, which originally appeared in the anthology The King Is Dead: Tales of Elvis Post-Mortem. Originally the film was "roadshowed" by the director across the country. Only 32 prints were made and circulated around various film festivals. However, this was enough to garner critical success for the movie, and it went on to win the Bram Stoker Award for Best Screenplay. By the time it was released on DVD, Bubba Ho-Tep had already achieved cult status due to positive reviews, lack of access, and the inclusion of Campbell.

While the novella and film revolve around an ancient Egyptian mummy (played by Bob Ivy) terrorizing a retirement home, Bubba Ho-Tep also deals with deeper themes of aging, identity, mortality, and existentialism. The film also features a cameo by Reggie Bannister from Coscarelli's Phantasm series.

== Plot ==
An elderly man at The Shady Rest Retirement Home in East Texas is known to the staff as Sebastian Haff, but claims to be the real Elvis Presley. He explains that during the 1970s, he grew tired of the demands of his fame and switched places with an Elvis impersonator named Sebastian Haff; he claims it was Haff who died in 1977, while he lived in quiet, happy anonymity and made a living pretending to be himself. After a propane explosion destroyed documentation which was the only proof that he was actually Elvis, he was unable to return to his old life. He also falls into a coma after injuring himself during a performance.

Twenty years later in the present, Elvis contemplates his age and dignity; his only friend is a man named Jack who insists he is President John F. Kennedy (who was nicknamed Jack) claiming to have had his skin dyed black after an assassination attempt and abandoned by Lyndon Johnson in a nursing home. Initially skeptical of Jack's story, Elvis does spot a mysterious scar on the back of Jack's head, but is ultimately unsure of its origin.

Eventually, Elvis and Jack are forced to face off against a re-animated ancient Egyptian mummy that was stolen during a U.S. museum tour, and then lost during a severe storm in East Texas when the thieves' bus veered into a river near the nursing home. The mummy takes on the garb of a cowboy and feeds on the souls of the residents of the home. Jack surmises that it feeds at the nursing home because the residents are weak and that nobody will suspect that it is killing them off. It is dubbed "Bubba Ho-Tep" by Elvis, who has a telepathic flashback of the mummy's life and death when he looks into its eyes. Due to their age, Jack and Elvis lack mobility and use a motorized wheelchair and a walker to get around the grounds.

Elvis and Jack create an elaborate plan to destroy the mummy. Destruction of the mummy would release the trapped souls of the other inhabitants, and they would be able to go to their final resting place. Elvis and Jack battle the mummy in the middle of the night, with Jack in an electric wheelchair and Elvis wielding a makeshift flamethrower. Jack is knocked out of his wheelchair by the mummy and is about to have his soul devoured; Elvis commandeers the wheelchair and taunts the mummy to draw it off Jack. With the mummy doused, set aflame, fallen on the ground, and burning, Elvis rouses the dying Jack long enough to receive a useless incantation. The mummy standing again, Elvis crashes himself and the wheelchair into the mummy. The two tumble down the riverbank below the bridge; Elvis receiving a deep mortal wound. Resigned to his death, Elvis knocks over the broken sprayer, spilling the rest of the gasoline towards the mummy. He throws a match to relight the mummy, killing it this time.

Elvis lies near the riverbank, dying from the gash and broken ribs. He contemplates that he does not fear death, knowing he still has his soul and has saved everyone at the Shady Rest Retirement Home. Reflecting on this, the stars align into a message for Elvis, saying: "all is well". Elvis says, "Thank you, thank you very much", and dies.

== Cast ==
- Bruce Campbell as Elvis Presley / Sebastian Haff
- Ossie Davis as John F. "Jack" Kennedy
- Ella Joyce as The Nurse
- Heidi Marnhout as Callie Thomas
- Bob Ivy as Bubba Ho-Tep
- Larry Pennell as Kemosabe
- Daniel Roebuck as Hearse Driver
- Reggie Bannister as Rest Home Administrator

== Production ==
Many of Bubba Ho-Tep's crew also worked on the films in Coscarelli's Phantasm series. Several actors from the series also have small roles including Heidi Marnhout, Bob Ivy, and Reggie Bannister. Coscarelli kept much of the original short story's exposition, but had some difficulty trying to "integrate Elvis' voice".

== Critical reception ==
Review aggregator Rotten Tomatoes reports a rating of 79% based on 107 reviews, and an average of 6.8/10. The site's consensus was a tongue-in-cheek statement, "The best movie to star both the King and JFK." Metacritic gives it a weighted average rating of 57/100 based on 28 reviews, indicating "mixed or average" reviews.

Peter Travers of Rolling Stone gave the film three out of four stars saying, "This absurdly clever caper is elevated by Bruce Campbell's pensive Elvis into a moving meditation on the diminutions of age and the vagaries of fame." Todd McCarthy of Variety gave a negative review, stating, "[The] introduction of the mummy plot basically derails the film at about the 45-minute point, and the silly climax...is so rote and generic that it could have come out of any ordinary horror film", although McCarthy does admit, "Campbell's Elvis stands as one of the very best screen interpretations of the King seen thus far, even if he's arguably not even playing the real thing."

Roger Ebert of the Chicago Sun-Times gave the film three out of four stars, highlighted the film's "delightful wackiness" and stated, "It has the damnedest ingratiating way of making us sit there and grin at its harebrained audacity, laugh at its outhouse humor, and be somewhat moved (not deeply, but somewhat) at the poignancy of these two old men and their situation."

=== Accolades ===
Bubba Ho-Tep won the Bram Stoker Award for Best Screenplay in 2003.

== Proposed sequel ==
Coscarelli didn't intend to create a sequel to Bubba Ho-Tep, and the end credits announcement of a second film entitled Bubba Nosferatu: Curse of the She-Vampires was meant as a joke. He changed his mind after the positive reception of the first film and after several people inquired about the sequel. The sequel would center around the production of a 'lost' Elvis movie from the 1950s or 1960s, and would bring in Paul Giamatti as Colonel Tom Parker.

In 2007 Bruce Campbell reported that he was no longer involved in the sequel, as he and Coscarelli had "a few points [developing the screenplay] that we couldn't reconcile", and that he had parted ways with the project as a way of keeping his friendship with the director. The project was briefly reported as "dead" by Joe Lansdale in February 2008, but later that same year Giamatti asserted that the film was still alive and that Ron Perlman was interested in taking over the role of Elvis. Due to the amount of time that had passed since the release of Bubba Ho-Tep, Coscarelli and Giamatti had trouble raising funding for the film, and the movie went back into development hell. However Giamatti reported that they were still trying to get the film made and that they had plans to create a franchise that would include plot lines such as Elvis battling aliens. In 2013 Giamatti confirmed that a script has been written and that it was "really great", and that he hoped that they would be able to eventually make the film.

Ultimately, Lansdale developed ideas discussed for the follow-up movie into a novella, Bubba and the Cosmic Bloodsuckers, published in 2017. This story took place earlier in Elvis's life, during a period in which he worked for Colonel Parker battling monsters prior to exchanging identities with Sebastian Haff.

In 2018, IDW Publishing released a five-issue limited series adaptation of the novella, retitled Bubba Ho-Tep and the Cosmic Blood-Suckers. The series was supervised by Lansdale, written by Joshua Jabcuga, and illustrated by Tadd Galusha. In 2019, Dynamite Entertainment published a four-issue crossover miniseries, Army of Darkness/Bubba Ho-Tep, which followed up the original story and saw Elvis team up with Ash Williams, another character portrayed by Bruce Campbell.

== See also ==
- List of cult films
