= 1992 Fangoria Chainsaw Awards =

Annual US horror film awards ceremony

1st Fangoria Chainsaw Awards
- Date: Saturday, May 16, 1992
- Site: Hilton Los Angeles Airport, Los Angeles, California, United States
- Hosted by: Bruce Campbell

Highlights
- Best Picture: The Silence of the Lambs

The 1992 Fangoria Chainsaw Awards ceremony, presented by Fangoria magazine and Creation Entertainment, honored the best horror films of 1991 and took place on May 16, 1992, at the Hilton Los Angeles Airport (5711 W. Century Blvd; formerly Hyatt) in Los Angeles, California. The ceremony was hosted by Bruce Campbell.

== Ceremony ==
The event was held as part of the Fangoria annual Weekend of Horrors convention with Creation Entertainment; previously, the magazine had awarded the best in genre film through its Movie Poll Awards since 1981. Former magazine editor Tony Timpone informed the Los Angeles Times, "Fangoria has been giving out Movie Poll Awards for the last eleven years, but this year we decided to revamp it, add more categories and turn it into an actual ceremony."

The Evil Dead star Bruce Campbell hosted the event at the Hilton Los Angeles Airport (formerly the Hyatt), and included presenters such as Danielle Harris (Halloween 5: The Revenge of Michael Myers), Breckin Meyer (Freddy's Dead: The Final Nightmare), Jason Voorhees actor and stuntman Kane Hodder, directors Sam Raimi and Stuart Gordon, and B-movie scream queen Linnea Quigley.

The People Under the Stairs and Terminator 2: Judgment Day tied for most nominations with six each; however, The People Under the Stairs did not win in any category. Both films were eclipsed by The Silence of the Lambs which won four of its five nominations. Winners Jonathan Demme, Anthony Hopkins, Jodie Foster, Ted Tally, and Christina Ricci were not present to accept the award. Each sent an acceptance speech that was published in Fangoria.

Other attendees at the convention included Dario Argento, Clive Barker, special effects artist Gabe Bartalos, Michelle Bauer, Robert Clarke, Ken Foree, Monique Gabrielle, Mick Garris, Lance Henriksen, Anthony Hickox, Adrienne King, John Landis, Barbara Steele, and Brinke Stevens. Sneaks peeks included previews for the films Army of Darkness and Alien 3.

== Winners and nominees ==
Best Wide Release	Best Limited Release
The Silence of the Lambs − Directed by Jonathan Demme; Freddy's Dead: The Final Nightmare − Directed by Rachel Talalay; The People Under the Stairs − Directed by Wes Craven; Terminator 2: Judgment Day − Directed by James Cameron; The Addams Family − Directed by Barry Sonnenfield	Bride of Re-Animator − Directed by Brian Yuzna; Maniac Cop 2 − Directed by William Lustig; The Pit and the Pendulum − Directed by Stuart Gordon; The Unborn − Directed by Rodman Flender; Warlock − Directed by Steve Miner
Best Actor	Best Actress
Anthony Hopkins − The Silence of the Lambs as Dr. Hannibal Lecter; Lance Henriksen − The Pit and the Pendulum as Torquemada; Raul Julia − The Addams Family as Gomez Addams; Everett McGill − The People Under the Stairs as Eldon Robeson / Daddy; Julian Sands − Warlock as Warlock	Jodie Foster − The Silence of the Lambs as Clarice Starling; Brooke Adams − The Unborn as Virginia Marshall; Linda Hamilton − Terminator 2: Judgment Day as Sarah Connor; Anjelica Huston − The Addams Family as Morticia Addams; Wendy Robie − The People Under the Stairs as Mrs. Robeson / Mommy
Best Supporting Actor	Best Supporting Actress
Brad Dourif − Body Parts as Remo Lacey; James Karen − The Unborn as Dr. Richard Meyerling; Joe Morton − Terminator 2: Judgment Day as Miles Dyson; Andrew Robinson − Child's Play 3 as Sergeant Botnick; Tom Towles − The Borrower as Bob Laney	Christina Ricci − The Addams Familyas Wednesday Addams; Adrienne Barbeau − Two Evil Eyes as Jessica Valdemar; Lezlie Deane − Freddy's Dead: The Final Nightmare as Tracy Swan; Lindsay Duncan − Body Parts as Dr. Agatha Webb; A.J. Langer − The People Under the Stairs as Alice Robeson
Best Screenplay	Best Score
The Silence of the Lambs − Ted Tally; Maniac Cop 2 − Larry Cohen; The People Under the Stairs − Wes Craven; Terminator 2: Judgment Day − James Cameron and William Wisher; Warlock − David Twohy	Terminator 2: Judgment Day − Brad Fiedel; Body Parts − Loek Dikker; The Pit and the Pendulum − Richard Band; The Silence of the Lambs − Howard Shore; Warlock − Jerry Goldsmith
Best Make-Up/Creature FX	Worst Film
Terminator 2: Judgment Day − Stan Winston; Body Parts − Gordon J. Smith; The Borrower − Kevin Yagher; Bride of Re-Animator − KNB EFX Group, John Carl Buechler, Screaming Mad George and Anthony Doublin; The People Under the Stairs − KNB EFX Group	Freddy's Dead: The Final Nightmare − Directed by Rachel Talalay

== Fangoria Horror Hall of Fame ==
- Jeffrey Combs
- Lance Henriksen

== Presenters ==
- John Skipp and Craig Spector — presented Best Score
- Danielle Harris and Breckin Meyer — presented Best Supporting Actor and Best Supporting Actress
- John Russo — presented Best Screenplay
- Steve Johnson — presented Best Make-Up/Creature FX
- Johnny Legend — presented Worst Film
- Linnea Quigley — presented Best Actress
- Kane Hodder — presented Best Actor
- Bruce Campbell, Sam Raimi and Robert Tapert — presented Best Limited Release
- Sam Arkoff — presented Best Wide Release
- Stuart Gordon — presented Fangoria Horror Hall of Fame
