= 1993 Fangoria Chainsaw Awards =

Annual US horror film awards ceremony

2nd Fangoria Chainsaw Awards
- Date: Saturday, May 1, 1993
- Site: Hilton Los Angeles Airport, Los Angeles, California

Highlights
- Best Picture: Bram Stoker's Dracula

The 1993 Fangoria Chainsaw Awards ceremony, presented by Fangoria magazine and Creation Entertainment, honored the best horror films of 1992 and took place on May 1, 1993, at the Sheraton Grand Los Angeles (711 S Hope St; formerly Hyatt Regency) in Los Angeles, California. The ceremony was hosted by Bruce Campbell.

== Winners and nominees ==
Best Wide Release	Best Limited Release
Bram Stoker's Dracula − Directed by Francis Ford Coppola; Alien 3 − Directed by David Fincher; Candyman − Directed by Bernard Rose; Hellraiser III: Hell on Earth − Directed by Anthony Hickox; Innocent Blood − Directed by John Landis	The Resurrected − Directed by Dan O'Bannon; Basket Case 3 − Directed by Frank Henenlotter; Highway to Hell − Directed by Ate de Jong; The Refrigerator − Directed by Nicholas Jacobs; Scanners III − Directed by Christian Duguay
Best Actor	Best Actress
Gary Oldman − Bram Stoker's Dracula as Count Dracula / Vlad the Impaler; Doug Bradley − Hellraiser III: Hell on Earth as Pinhead / Captain Elliott Spencer; Jeff Fahey − The Lawnmower Man as Jobe Smith; Robert Loggia − Innocent Blood as Salvatore "Sal The Shark" Macelli; Tony Todd − Candyman as Candyman	Virginia Madsen − Candyman as Helen Lyle; Anne Parillaud − Innocent Blood as Marie; Winona Ryder − Bram Stoker's Dracula as Mina Harker and Elisabeta; Kristy Swanson − Buffy the Vampire Slayer as Buffy Summers; Sigourney Weaver − Alien 3 as Ellen Ripley
Best Supporting Actor	Best Supporting Actress
Anthony Hopkins − Bram Stoker's Dracula as Professor Abraham Van Helsing and the Romanian Orthodox priest; Clancy Brown − Pet Sematary II as Sheriff Gus Gilbert; Charles S. Dutton − Alien 3 as Leonard Dillon; Don Rickles − Innocent Blood as Manny Bergman; Chris Sarandon − The Resurrected as Charles Dexter Ward / Joseph Curwen	Alice Krige − Sleepwalkers as Mary Brady; Sadie Frost − Bram Stoker's Dracula as Lucy Westenra; Paula Marshall − Hellraiser III: Hell on Earth as Terri / Dreamer Cenobite; Annie Ross − Basket Case 3 as Granny Ruth; Vanessa Williams − Candyman as Anne-Marie McCoy
Best Screenplay	Best Score
Bram Stoker's Dracula − James V. Hart; Hellraiser III: Hell on Earth − Peter Atkins; Naked Lunch − David Cronenberg; The Resurrected − Brent V. Friedman; Candyman − Bernard Rose	Bram Stoker's Dracula − Wojciech Kilar; Twin Peaks: Fire Walk with Me − Angelo Badalamenti; Raising Cain − Pino Donaggio; Candyman − Philip Glass; Naked Lunch − Howard Shore and Ornette Coleman
Best Make-Up/Creature FX	Worst Film
Bram Stoker's Dracula − Greg Cannom; Dr. Giggles − KNB EFX Group; Hellraiser III: Hell on Earth − Bob Keen; Innocent Blood − Steve Johnson; Naked Lunch − Chris Walas and James Isaac	Dr. Giggles − Directed by Manny Coto

== Fangoria Horror Hall of Fame ==
- Anthony Hopkins
- Linnea Quigley
