= The Human Centipede (First Sequence) =

2009 film by Tom Six

- Theatrical release poster
- Directed by: Tom Six
- Written by: Tom Six
- Produced by: Ilona Six; Tom Six
- Starring: Dieter Laser; Ashley C. Williams; Ashlynn Yennie; Akihiro Kitamura
- Cinematography: Goof de Koning
- Edited by: Tom Six
- Music by: Patrick Savage; Holeg Spies
- Production company: Six Entertainment Company
- Distributed by: IFC Films
- Release dates: 30 August 2009 (FrightFest); 30 April 2010
- Running time: 92 minutes
- Country: Netherlands
- Languages: English; German; Japanese
- Budget: $1.6 million
- Box office: $352,161

The Human Centipede (First Sequence) is a 2009 Dutch body horror film written, directed and co-produced by Tom Six. The independent film concerns a deranged German surgeon who kidnaps three tourists and conjoins them surgically, mouth to anus, forming the eponymous "human centipede". It stars Dieter Laser as Josef Heiter, the creator of the centipede, and Ashley C. Williams, Ashlynn Yennie, and Akihiro Kitamura as Heiter's victims.

According to Six, the concept arose from a joke he had made with friends about punishing a child molester by stitching his mouth to the anus of a "fat truck driver". Other sources of inspiration were Nazi medical experiments performed during World War II, such as those performed by Josef Mengele at the Auschwitz concentration camp. When approaching investors to fund the project, Six did not mention the premise of the film for fear of putting off potential backers; financiers did not discover the full nature of the film until completion.

The film held its premiere at the London FrightFest Film Festival on 30 August 2009. It received a limited theatrical release in the United States on 30 April 2010. Despite a mixed critical reception, the film won several accolades at international film festivals. Two sequels that were also written and directed by Six—Full Sequence and Final Sequence—were released in 2011 and 2015, respectively. The entire trilogy was combined into a single film in 2016, titled Complete Sequence, which Six described as a "movie centipede" due to each Sequence leading into its successor while simultaneously working as a separate standalone cinematic film.

== Plot ==
Lindsay and Jenny, tourists from New York City visiting Germany, get a flat tire on their way to a nightclub and seek help at the house of Dr. Josef Heiter. He drugs the women with Rohypnol in their water and locks them up in a makeshift medical ward.

The misanthropic, psychopathic surgeon Heiter is a retired world-renowned expert at separating conjoined twins, but dreams of "making new creatures." He plans to surgically connect his three victims' mouths to their anus, so that they share a single digestive system. His prior experiment, the 3Dog, conjoined three Rottweilers into a "conjoined triplet"; all three dogs died following the operation.

Lindsay and Jenny find themselves trapped on their gurneys next to a Dutch truck driver, whom Heiter kidnapped at the beginning of the film. Heiter declared the trucker incompatible with the ladies and ends his life. He later kidnaps Japanese tourist Katsuro. After Lindsay tries to escape and fails, Heiter decides to make her the middle segment of the centipede. Heiter performs the surgery, placing Katsuro at the lead, Lindsay in the middle, and Jenny at the rear; mutilating Lindsay and Jenny's mouths and stitching each to the anus of the person in front. He severs the ligaments of his victims' knees, forcing them to crawl.

Once the operation is complete, Heiter takes the centipede to his living room, takes photos of each segment to humiliate them, and passes a mirror around so the segments can view their new form. Heiter treats his human centipede as a pet by caging the centipede in a dog kennel, training them into obeying his orders, forcing Katsuro to eat dog food at dinner, and belittling Katsuro with racist insults and beating him with a crop when he becomes rebellious.

Eventually, Katsuro needs to defecate. He does so after apologizing to the girls, after which Lindsay is forced to swallow his excrement. Heiter becomes irritated after being kept awake at night by the caged centipede and threatens Katsuro (who, as the front part of the centipede, has his mouth free and is still able to speak) with the removal of his vocal cords. When the centipede attempts to escape while Heiter is swimming, all three segments are punished by being beaten with the crop. During a checkup, Heiter is displeased to learn that Lindsay is constipated. He proposes to use laxatives on Lindsay, but discovers that Jenny is dying from sepsis.

Two detectives, Kranz and Voller, visit the house to investigate the disappearance of the three tourists as well as the trucker. Heiter is inspired to add them as replacements for Jenny in a new four-segment centipede. He offers the detectives more spiked water, causing them to become suspicious and obtain a search warrant for his home. After the detectives leave, the victims attempt to escape, and Katsuro attacks Heiter. He injures him, but their attempt to escape fails. Katsuro confesses to Heiter that he deserves his fate because he treated his family poorly, then takes his own life by slitting his throat with a glass shard.

Upon returning to Heiter's home, the detectives conduct separate searches as Heiter, injured, hides near his swimming pool. Kranz finds the ward containing Heiter's victims. Voller begins to feel ill from the earlier drugging, and Heiter stabs him with a scalpel that he pulled from his foot during Katsuro's attack, killing him. Heiter takes Voller's sidearm and shoots Kranz when he enters. Kranz fatally shoots Heiter in the head before succumbing to his wounds.

Back in the house, Jenny and Lindsay hold hands as Jenny dies from her infection. Lindsay sobs as she is left alone in the house, trapped between her deceased fellow captives.

== Cast ==
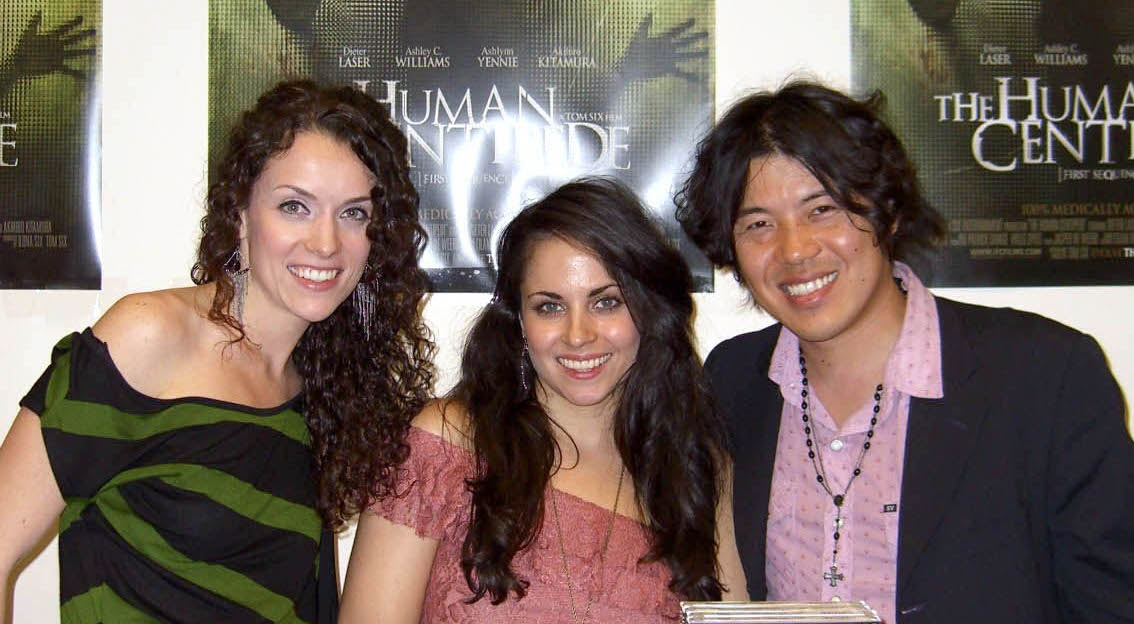
Stars Ashlynn Yennie, Ashley C. Williams, and Akihiro Kitamura at the Big Apple Convention in Manhattan, 1 October 2010

- Dieter Laser as Josef Heiter, a retired surgeon who specialised in the separation of conjoined twins, but in retirement is more interested in joining creatures together. Casting for the role of Heiter took place in Berlin, and Six intended to cast Laser before he had even read for the part, after Six saw a DVD of one of Laser's previous films. Laser had previously appeared in over 60 mostly German-language films, including Der Unhold and Baltic Storm (he speaks German in parts of First Sequence as well). Upon meeting him in Berlin, Six gave Laser a shot-by-shot explanation of Heiter's scenes, and Laser, impressed by Six's dedication and passion, agreed to take part in the film. Laser contributed considerably to the development of Heiter's character. For example, because Heiter views the "centipede" as his pet, Laser felt that it was important that Heiter appear naked during a scene in which he swam in full view of his victims, because Laser said "you aren't ashamed to be naked" around a pet.
- Ashley C. Williams as Lindsay, an American tourist, a friend of Jenny's, and the central section of the centipede. Auditioning for the roles of Jenny and Lindsay took place in New York City. Six said during the auditioning process, many actresses walked out of readings in disgust after hearing the full nature of the role. Others thought they would be able to take on the role, but found it was "too much" for them once they got onto their hands and knees behind another actor. Williams expressed concern about the nudity expected of her in the film, but took the role when she was assured it would be modest and of a non-sexual nature.
- Ashlynn Yennie as Jenny, an American tourist, a friend of Lindsay's, and the rear section of the centipede, where she acts as the functioning anus. As with Williams, The Human Centipede was Yennie's first major film role. Yennie was one of several actresses to audition for the role, as the producers searched for an actress who would have good on-screen chemistry with Williams. Yennie was able to further develop her relationship with Williams when the pair shared an apartment in the Netherlands during filming. Yennie auditioned to Ilona Six, the film's producer and sister of Tom Six, and did not meet Tom Six, who had viewed tapes of her reading, until fitting for the centipede special effects in the Netherlands. Yennie was drawn to the role by the humanity throughout the story, referring to how the three victims of Heiter are unwillingly forced into their situation. She also said the story was so realistic it scared her.
- Akihiro Kitamura as Katsuro, a Japanese tourist and front section of the centipede, acting as the head. Having already acted in or written for a number of films and television shows (including popular American television series Heroes), Kitamura was a relatively experienced actor compared to other cast members. He auditioned for the role of Katsuro via Skype from Los Angeles after the casting director saw him on television and recommended him for the role. The rest of the cast did not meet Kitamura until the day before shooting commenced.
- Rene de Wit as Truck Driver, one of Heiter's victims. De Wit had previously worked with Six in his 2008 film I Love Dries.
- Andreas Leupold as Detective Kranz, a police officer.
- Peter Blankenstein as Detective Voller, a police officer.

== Production ==
=== Writing ===
The inspiration for the film's plot came from a joke that writer/director Tom Six once made to his friends about punishing a child molester they saw on TV by stitching his mouth to the anus of an overweight truck driver. Six saw this as the concept for a great horror film, and he began to develop the idea. He has said he was heavily influenced as a filmmaker by the early works of David Cronenberg and Japanese horror films. Six has said he prefers horror films that are more realistic over monster films that are "not really believable", and that he gets "a rash from too much political correctness." A major influence for The Human Centipede was Pier Paolo Pasolini's controversial 1975 Italian drama film Salò, or the 120 Days of Sodom, which was notable for its scenes depicting intensely graphic violence, sadism, and sexual depravity, as was the work of Japanese director Takashi Miike. Six has also expressed his love of the works of David Lynch. Further inspiration came from Six's previous role as a director on the Dutch series of Big Brother, where he had been able to observe people who "did crazy things when they were alone and thought they were not (being) watched."

Six has stated that The Human Centipede is, to an extent, a reflection on fascism. Dieter Laser, who played the antagonist Dr Heiter, said during the promotion of the film that he felt the guilt of Nazi actions during the war had haunted ordinary Germans for generations, and that as a German whose father participated in the war, he often felt "like a child whose father is in jail for murder." The inclusion of a German villain came from this, with Six citing both the German invasion of the Netherlands during World War II and the Nazi medical experiments as inspiration. Laser stated in an interview with Clark Collis for Entertainment Weekly that he considered the film a "grotesque [parody] about the Nazi psyche". Heiter's name was an amalgamation of several Nazi war criminals, his surname (literally meaning "cheerful" in German) a combination of the names of Nazi doctors Fetter and Richter, and his first name coming from Josef Mengele, who carried out experiments on prisoners at the Auschwitz concentration camp. World War II also played an influence on the nationality of the other main characters who were American and Japanese. Six includes many horror film clichés in the first act, such as a broken-down car, lack of phone signal and very naïve victims. Six did this in an attempt to lull audiences into thinking they are watching a conventional horror film, therefore making Dr Heiter's treatment of his victims more shocking.

Six placed a Japanese male at the front of the centipede to create a language barrier between the doctor and the centipede. Throughout the film the characters (with the exception of Heiter who for the most part speaks to the centipede in English) speak in their native languages only (subtitled for the viewer into English where necessary). Katsuro, as the front part of the centipede, can only speak Japanese and therefore cannot speak with either the doctor or Jenny and Lindsay. Secondly, Katsuro's position in the centipede sets up the opportunity for the doctor and the male victim of the centipede to fight toward the climax of the film. Six stated in the director's commentary for The Human Centipede that he has a personal fear of hospitals and doctors, so he stretched out the scene where Heiter explains how he will create the centipede and the subsequent procedure to create his "own nightmare."

While seeking funding for the film, Six pitched the idea of a surgeon who sewed people together. He did not initially reveal that the victims would be joined mouth-to-anus, as he believed this idea would stand no chance of receiving investments. His backers felt that the idea of a surgeon sewing people together was original and Six received funding. However, they did not learn the exact details of the film until it had been completed. Six claimed that they were very happy with the finished film. Before signing on, the actors were given an outline of the storyboard rather than a complete script. They were also shown sketches of how the centipede would be formed.

=== Filming ===
Although The Human Centipede is set in Germany, principal photography took place in the Netherlands due to the neighbouring countries' similar landscapes. Heiter's home, where most of The Human Centipede takes place, was a villa in the Netherlands found by the production team. The property was in a residential area and not surrounded by woodland as it appears in the film, but by other houses. This meant the filmmakers had some difficulty ensuring that the other houses did not appear in shot. Some conversion of the property took place prior to filming, such as a home theater which was converted to form Heiter's basement operating room, with real hospital beds and intravenous drips rented from a local hospital. The paintings of conjoined twins that were displayed throughout the house were painted by Tom Six, which he felt contributed to the atmosphere in the house. The hotel room scene near the beginning of the film was filmed in a hotel suite at a location near Amsterdam. The film was shot almost entirely in sequence, which Yennie stated helped the actors to develop their characters throughout the film. The opening scene, which only featured Laser and de Wit, was shot on the last day of filming.

Laser remained in character as Heiter throughout the filming process, often shouting at the rest of the cast on set, and wherever possible staying away from the other actors and crew between scenes to preserve a level of separation. He only ate food he had brought onto the set himself, eating mostly fruit. He contributed dialogue for his character and selected many of his character's outfits from his personal wardrobe. Six claims that the jacket Heiter wore, which was bought by Laser, was a genuine jacket worn by real Nazi doctors. Laser was also happy for the other actors in The Human Centipede to add their own ideas to the film. For example, when Heiter is explaining his procedure to his victims, Katsuro's dialogue was improvised, which pleased Laser. During filming Laser accidentally kicked Kitamura (Katsuro), leading to a fight on set between the actors. The incident contributed to the tension and anger throughout the scene they were filming, in which Heiter sits at his dining table eating while the centipede eats dog food from the floor alongside him. Laser also unintentionally hurt Williams during the scene where Heiter roughly grabs and injects Lindsay, which caused a pause in shooting.

The Nazi influence behind Heiter led to the use of classical music when the doctor is "training" his centipede. The music was deliberately played at low quality to simulate the music coming from a loudspeaker, in much the same way as music was sometimes played in Nazi concentration camps. Many of the sound effects in The Human Centipede were created by manipulating meat. For example, the sound of a nose being broken was made by snapping bones within cuts of raw meat. Due to the discomfort of spending long periods on their hands and knees, the actors playing the centipede were given massages at the end of each day of filming. Yennie stated that she and Williams experienced jaw pain from holding a bit in their mouths during filming, but overall she did not feel that the physical side of filming had been excessively difficult.

=== Effects ===
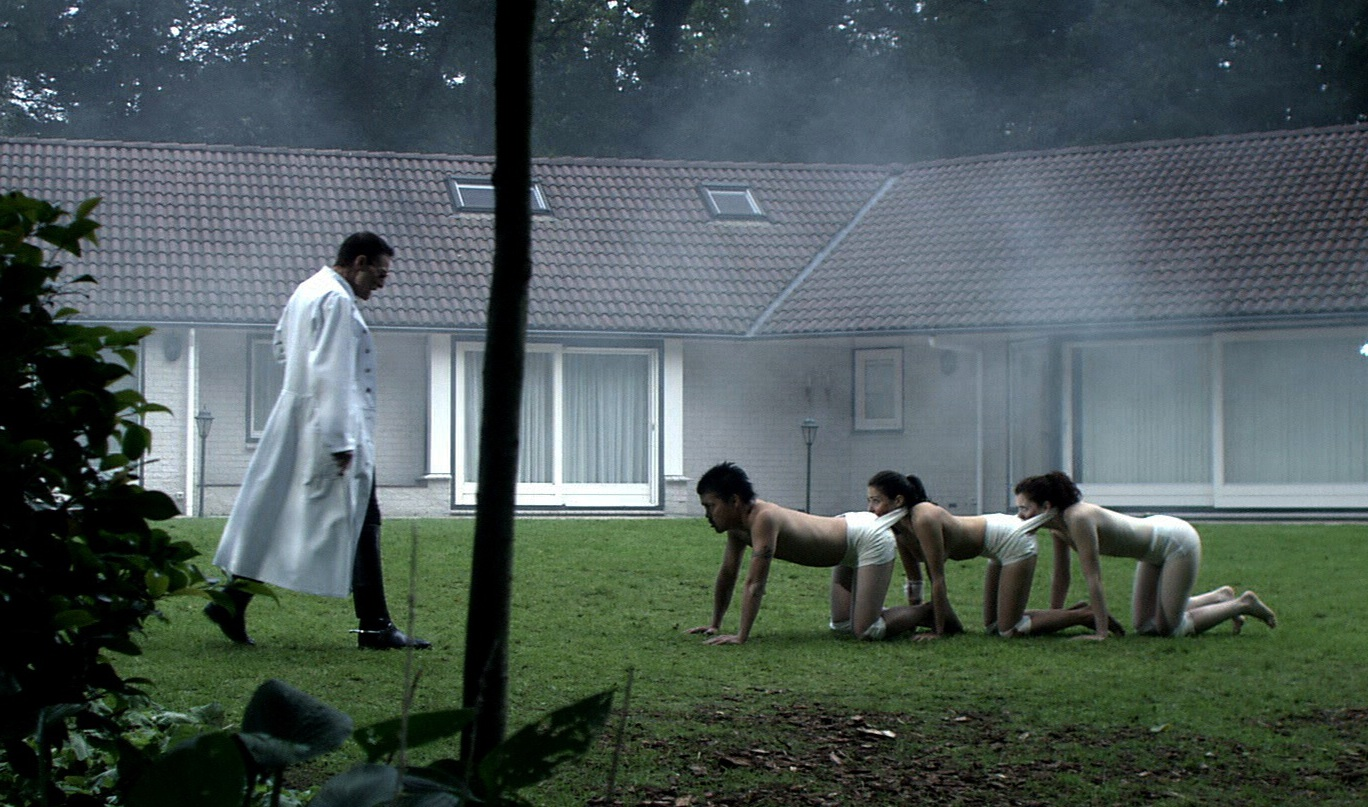
Heiter attempts to "train" his completed human centipede. The use of bandages in The Human Centipede allowed the filmmakers to imply a more graphic and disturbing idea than is actually shown on screen.

The Human Centipede contains relatively few gory images; little of the surgical procedure is depicted directly, no excrement is shown on screen, and according to Kim Newman in Empire, it is "never quite as outrageous as it threatens to be." Six stated that he wanted the film to be as authentic as possible and claimed to have consulted a Dutch surgeon during the creation and filming process, resulting in the film being "100% medically accurate." Six said that the surgeon initially wanted nothing to do with his film, as he felt Six was "crazy" and the idea had "nothing to do with medical science." However, the surgeon changed his mind and decided that he liked the idea, and so came up with a method of creating a human centipede. Six has claimed that the central and rear members of the centipede could survive longer by being provided vitamins and fluids via an IV drip, adding that feces still contain some nutrients, though he acknowledged that there would be progressively less nutrients for every segment following the second one. The special effects team was led by Rob and Erik Hillenbrink, father and son. They designed the final composition of the centipede from sketches provided by the consulting surgeon. The actors who made up the centipede wore hardened underwear, compared by Yennie to shorts, which had a rubber grip for the actors to wear, and for the actor behind to bite, creating the illusion of the mouth-to-anus connection. Six kept secret how the centipede would be formed as long as possible, and Yennie claimed that even her make-up artist did not know, asking Yennie what kind of "suit" the actors would be wearing.

When Heiter is operating on his victims, Jenny's teeth were digitally removed in post-production. However, other effects were relatively simple to create. Heiter's "three dog" was created by Photoshopping an image of three Rottweilers to create an image of dogs joined together. Colour grading was used extensively throughout the production of The Human Centipede. For example, at the end of the film when Lindsay is left between the dead bodies of Jenny and Katsuro, their skin tones were lightened to further emphasise that they were dead and Lindsay was still alive.

The rain when Jenny and Lindsay's car breaks down was added digitally in post-production. The filmmakers had not been granted permission to film at the roadside location, but went ahead against the authorities' wishes as Six felt the location in the woods was ideal for the scene. When Heiter's window is repaired after Lindsay's escape attempt, the use of a tracking shot through the window pane required the reflection of the crew to be digitally removed from the glass. The film contains a large number of long tracking shots; Six has cited the influence of Takashi Miike who also uses many tracking shots in his films.

== Release ==
=== Promotion ===
During promotion for The Human Centipede, press materials claimed that the film was "100% medically accurate". Six and the producers frequently stated that the film had been described as "the most horrific film ever made," and many writers, such as Karina Longworth of LA Weekly magazine and Jay Stone of the Calgary Herald, described the film as torture porn. Roger Ebert, writing in the Chicago Sun-Times, stated that he felt the film had been "deliberately intended to inspire incredulity, nausea and hopefully outrage." However, writing in The Guardian, David Cox noted that he had been unable to trace the source of this quote as the "most horrific film ever made" and had contacted Six to attempt to ascertain the origin of the judgement. Six claimed that the statement had originally been made by The Sun newspaper in the United Kingdom. However, Cox was unable to trace any article making this claim. When asked by Cox as to what Six regarded as the "most horrific" film, Six stated he in fact believed it to be Pier Paolo Pasolini's Salò, or the 120 Days of Sodom.

=== Theatrical ===
The Human Centipede was released in the United States without an MPAA rating. It was released theatrically in New York City on 30 April 2010 and had a limited release in the US shortly afterward, distributed by IFC Films. Throughout 2009, the film was included in several film festivals around the world including the London FrightFest Film Festival, Leeds International Film Festival, Sitges Film Festival, and Screamfest Horror Film Festival. Six remarked on how many film festival audiences reacted strongly to the film, sometimes almost vomiting in the cinema aisles. To Six's amusement, Spanish audiences often found the film funny, and laughed throughout screenings. Six claimed that the "buzz" surrounding the film led to several studios approaching him to discuss its distribution. IFC Films has a history of releasing unconventional horror films, having previously distributed the Norwegian Nazi-zombie feature Dead Snow and the 2009 release Antichrist. The Human Centipede's US gross was $181,467, and worldwide takings amounted to $252,207.

The film was passed uncut by the British Board of Film Classification (BBFC) and released with an 18 certificate, receiving a limited run in the UK on 20 August 2010. It was distributed by Bounty Films.

=== Home media ===
The Human Centipede was released in the United Kingdom on DVD and Blu-ray on 4 October 2010, and in the US the following day, where, as of July 2023, DVD sales have totalled $3,750,554. The film was released on 4K UHD on 22 October 2026 by Umbrella Entertainment, along with a VHS release in a limited collectors' edition.

== Reception ==
=== Critical response ===
The Human Centipede received mixed reviews. Review aggregator web site Rotten Tomatoes gave the film a 47% approval rating based on 95 reviews, with an average rating of 5.15/10; the general consensus states: "Grotesque, visceral and hard to (ahem) swallow, this surgical horror doesn't quite earn its stripes because the gross-outs overwhelm and devalue everything else." At Metacritic, which assigns a weighted average score out of 100 to reviews from mainstream critics, the film received an average score of 33, based on 15 reviews, indicating "generally unfavorable reviews".

Giving the film three stars out of five, Empire writer Kim Newman stated that "underneath an extremely repulsive concept, this is a relatively conventional horror movie." Variety Magazine writer Peter DeBurge criticised the film's lack of social commentary, stating that it could not "be bothered to expand upon its unpleasant premise, inviting audiences to revel in its sick humor by favoring Dr. Heiter ... and characterizing the victims as shallow expendables." Writing in Entertainment Weekly, Clark Collis was broadly positive about Dieter Laser's performance as the Doctor, and praised Six's direction, saying Six "has put together his nightmare yarn with Cronenbergian care and precision." Collis said The Human Centipede was "without question one of the most disgusting horror films ever made." Writing in The Guardian, Peter Bradshaw gave the film three out of five, saying that, whilst "entirely deplorable and revolting," the film was "sort of brilliant". Total Film writer Jamie Russell gave the film four stars out of five, calling it "Shocking, funny, disturbing... a throwback to the glory days of Cronenberg."

Sukhdev Sandhu of The Daily Telegraph was generally negative about the film, stating, "The Human Centipede has its moments, but they're largely obscured by umpteen holes in the plot as well as by reams of exposition," and that it was "an ultimately underwhelming affair that's neither sick or [ sic ] repellent enough to garner the cult status it so craves." The New York Times review by Jeannette Catsoulis noted that whether the film was "a commentary on Nazi atrocities or a literal expression of filmmaking politics, the grotesque fusion at least silences the female leads, both of whose voices could strip paint." Writing in the Chicago Sun Times, Roger Ebert did not assign the film a star rating (not to be confused with awarding it zero stars), stating, "I am required to award stars to movies I review. This time, I refuse to do it. The star rating system is unsuited to this film. Is the movie good? Is it bad? Does it matter? It is what it is and occupies a world where the stars don't shine."

Critics and a doctor have dismissed Six's claim that the film was "100 percent medically accurate" as "utterly ludicrous" and "rubbish". Dr John Cameron, speaking to TV3 News in New Zealand, gave an interview about the feasibility of a human centipede, stating how he believed it would be difficult for a join between different people to heal and form a connection, and how the centipede would quickly die from lack of nutrition. John Martin, a former Hollywood film executive and CEO of Alamo Drafthouse Cinemas, said Six's claims of 100 percent medical accuracy should be viewed with reference to the kind of shock gimmicks that film producers had long used to attract attention. Martin compared Six's claims to those of Kroger Babb and William Castle, who had also made "grand promises" about what they were putting on screen, in a bid to lure audiences.

Reviewing the film as its sequel, The Human Centipede 2 (Full Sequence) (2011), was in production, Tom Butler of IGN praised Laser's performance as well as Six's "creative use of his limited locations". However, Butler also felt that "despite the twisted concept, The Human Centipede actually pulls a lot of potential punches, and the gore on offer is relatively tame", concluding that "with its half-decent and morbidly intriguing premise already set up, let's hope Tom Six doesn't hold back next time, letting rip with the gore, and amping up the gross-out factor to give horror fans the Centipede film they crave".

In 2013, GamesRadar+ named Dr. Heiter one of the "50 Creepiest Movie Psychopaths".

=== Accolades ===
Despite mixed reviews, the film won several awards in 2009 during advance screenings at various international horror film festivals, including Best Picture/Movie at Fantastic Fest (Austin, Texas), Screamfest Horror Film Festival (Los Angeles), and the Sainte Maxime International Horror Film Festival. Laser won Best Actor in the horror category at Fantastic Fest and the film won the award for Best Ensemble Cast at the South African Horrorfest.

== Sequels ==
Each film or "sequence" in the Human Centipede franchise acts as both a standalone project and as a segment in a larger 4.5-hour film, with the trilogy serving as a 'Movie Centipede'.

When Tom Six began creating the Human Centipede sequels, he envisioned a trilogy that works as a "movie centipede". Each sequel opens with the ending of the previous film, as the events of that film influence said sequel. Although every film is intended to work as a standalone movie, they can all be connected to form a single 4.5-hour-long film.

While promoting The Human Centipede, Six stated that he had started work on a sequel to First Sequence, titled The Human Centipede 2 (Full Sequence). Shooting on a similar budget to the first film, Six stated the sequel would be a much more graphic, disturbing and even "shittier" film; First Sequence being "My Little Pony compared with part two." Yennie stated at the May 2010 Weekend of Horrors that the sequel would contain "the blood and shit" that viewers did not see in the first film. The plot of Full Sequence involved a centipede made from twelve people, featured a largely British cast, and was given the tagline "100% medically inaccurate".

The plot of Full Sequence involves a man who, after becoming sexually obsessed with a DVD recording of First Sequence, decides to create his own human centipede. The film had been planned for a DVD release in the United Kingdom. However, upon submitting the film to the BBFC for classification, the film was rejected due to content that was "sexually violent and potentially obscene". The BBFC's report criticised the film as making "little attempt to portray any of the victims in the film as anything other than objects to be brutalised, degraded and mutilated for the amusement and arousal of the central character, as well as for the pleasure of the audience," and that the film was potentially in breach of the Obscene Publications Act, meaning its distribution in the UK would be illegal. Bounty Films, the UK distributor, appealed the decision, and the film was eventually passed with an 18 certificate in October 2011. To achieve the 18 rating, thirty-two cuts were made from the film, removing two minutes and thirty-seven seconds from the original version.

The third and final film in the trilogy, The Human Centipede 3 (Final Sequence), received a limited theatrical release on 22 May 2015. The film features the largest human centipede in the series, composed of five hundred victims, as Six says, "each film is a reaction to the other. And the film got so big, it was a pop culture phenomenon, and people wanted more: a bigger centipede, helicopters and things… it had to be bigger and bigger. And what I did, I used the idea and almost made a parody on the human centipede films itself." As Full Sequence was intended to make First Sequence look like My Little Pony in comparison, Final Sequence was intended to make Full Sequence resemble a Disney film. The movie features the tagline "100% Politically Incorrect". Both Dieter Laser and Full Sequence star Laurence R. Harvey returned in starring, albeit different, roles.

The Human Centipede (Final Sequence) was nominated for two Golden Raspberry Awards in the categories of "Worst Director" and "Worst Prequel, Remake, Rip-Off, or Sequel", respectively. It was also named the second-worst movie of 2015 by Entertainment Weekly and The A.V. Club. In 2016, a compilation film of the entire trilogy titled The Human Centipede (Complete Sequence): The Movie Centipede was released, running a total of 275 minutes.

== Parodies ==
A number of parodies of the film have been made. A pornographic parody, directed by Lee Roy Myers and titled The Human Sexipede, was released in September 2010. It starred Tom Byron as Heiter, who joined three people mouth-to-genitals. The South Park episode "HUMANCENTiPAD" saw character Kyle Broflovski unwittingly agreeing to become a part of a "Human CENTiPAD" after failing to read the full details of an Apple user license agreement. The website Funny or Die featured a sketch where the freed victims of a human centipede, now separated, but scarred physically and mentally, argue at a survivors' meeting. The Human Centipede 3 (Final Sequence) actress Bree Olson starred in a parody of the franchise that was directed by Graham Rich. "Red Flags", a song by Tom Cardy and featuring Montaigne, is about a man who is first repulsed by, and then swept up in his date's obsession with the film. In 2023, The Human Centipede Musical was performed in Brisbane and Melbourne in Australia, with a book by Liam Hartley and Oliver Catton.

== Graphic novel ==
In January 2016, Tom Six revealed on Twitter that production of a graphic novel adaptation of The Human Centipede was underway, along with posting an image of a test printed copy. It was also stated the graphic novel was going to be available in English, Spanish, German, French, and Japanese. The release for the graphic novel was stated to be in 2017, but it wasn't released that year.

On 27 March 2018, Six again posted on Twitter that the graphic novel was ready, and he is seeking a distributor for it. Later in May 2019, in an interview with Bloody Disgusting, Six said that the graphic novel, along with a behind-the-scenes book of the first film, is set to be released on the 10th anniversary of the series, which he reiterated on Twitter. The book ended up not being released due to Six being unable to find a publisher.

The story of the graphic novel will feature the events of the first film but it will display things that occurred before, and an epilogue that will shed light on the fate of the character Lindsay.

== Future ==
Although Tom Six openly stated he viewed The Human Centipede as a trilogy, he told Bloody Disgusting in an interview that if he had to make a fourth installment he did have some ideas. Six said, "If I had to make a fourth one, which I might do in 20 years from now, who knows, it will be about connecting all starving Africans on the African continent done by a charity organisation, to solve the hunger problem. Or about aliens connecting the whole human race!"

Tom Six later revealed that he had written a script for a potential spin-off film titled The Human Caterpillar, a reference to a scene from The Human Centipede 3 (Final Sequence) where sewed prison inmates had their limbs amputated so they resemble a caterpillar. Furthermore, Six stated that the concept of The Human Centipede would appear in future projects in some form.

== See also ==
- List of films featuring psychopaths and sociopaths
- Parabiosis § Parabiotic experiments (a similar class of real-world experiments on animals).
