= The Human Centipede 3 (Final Sequence) =

2015 film by Tom Six

- Theatrical release poster
- Directed by: Tom Six
- Written by: Tom Six
- Produced by: Tom Six; Ilona Six
- Starring: Dieter Laser; Laurence R. Harvey; Robert LaSardo; Tommy Lister Jr.; Jay Tavare; Eric Roberts; Bree Olson; Clayton Rohner; Bill Hutchens
- Cinematography: David Meadows
- Edited by: Tom Six
- Music by: Misha Segal
- Production company: Six Entertainment Company
- Distributed by: IFC Midnight
- Release date: 22 May 2015 (United States)
- Running time: 102 minutes
- Countries: United States; Netherlands
- Language: English
- Box office: $18,976

The Human Centipede 3 (Final Sequence) is a 2015 black comedy body horror film written and directed by Tom Six and starring Dieter Laser and Laurence R. Harvey, the leading actors from the first two films in new roles, Robert LaSardo, Tommy "Tiny" Lister, Jay Tavare, Eric Roberts, Bree Olson, Clayton Rohner, and Bill Hutchens as well as a cameo by Six. The film tells the story of a psychopathic prison warden and his accountant who create their own "human centipede" from the inmates. It is the conclusion to Six's The Human Centipede trilogy.

The Human Centipede 3 was released both theatrically and on video on demand on 22 May 2015. The film was panned by critics due to its overwhelming gore and repetitive plot compared to its predecessors. It was deemed one of the worst films of 2015 and at the Golden Raspberry Awards, it was nominated for Worst Prequel, Remake, Rip-off or Sequel and Six was nominated for Worst Director.

== Plot ==
At George H. W. Bush State Prison somewhere in the Southwestern United States, William "Bill" Boss, a cannibalistic, psychopathic warden, watches the end of The Human Centipede 2 (Full Sequence) with his accountant, Dwight Butler. Bill is then informed that one of the guards has been injured. He then confronts and breaks the arms of the inmate who did it. He then goes outside and yells at the other inmates.

Bill receives a threatening prank phone call from an inmate. He then has a medical checkup with Dr. Jones, in which Bill believes there is nothing wrong with himself. Bill waterboards the inmate who prank-called him with three buckets of boiling water as punishment, horribly disfiguring him. Governor Hughes arrives, ordering Bill and Dwight to stop the violence and promising that they will both be fired otherwise. In anger and retaliation, Bill orders a mass castration of the inmates, brutally castrating one of the prisoners himself, then cooks and eats the testicles for "energy food."

Dwight pitches an idea to fix the prison's horrible retention and violence rates to Bill: suture all of the inmates together, mouth-to-anus, forming a giant human centipede, which would be the ultimate deterrent to crime. Bill is skeptical and opposed to the idea. Bill then has a nightmare about being attacked by inmates and raped by the inmate he castrated. Bill then summons the director of The Human Centipede 2, Tom Six, to the prison. Bill is assured that the films are "100% medically accurate". Six grants the prison permission to use his Centipede idea, provided he may witness the operation. The first two films are then shown to the inmates as a preview of their future, sparking a riot. Inmates chase Bill and Dwight to the warden's office, prompting Dwight to order the entry of special forces. The rioting prisoners beat his assistant, Daisy, unconscious until they are subdued by the assault team, which restores order in the prison.

Bill goes around each cell and shoots every inmate with tranquilizers, readying them for the operation. Incompatible inmates are shot and killed. They discover an inmate with Crohn's disease, who suffers from severe diarrhea. Bill orders the man who raped him in the dream to be attached to him as an added punishment. Daisy is in a coma, where she is raped by Bill. Six returns to the prison, where he is met by Bill and Dwight. After touring the cells, they discover a mentally unstable inmate eating his own feces, wanting to be sewn to the centipede. Bill shoots and kills the inmate as he does not want anyone to enjoy the punishment.

Upon the centipede's completion, Governor Hughes arrives, greatly disgusted at what he sees. In addition to the centipede, a "Human Caterpillar" has been created by suturing together death row inmates, along with those who were given a life sentence, and amputating their limbs. Daisy has been sewn into the Centipede, while one inmate from the Centipede is in the infirmary, having been disconnected after serving his time. Hughes leaves the prison, telling Dwight and Bill they should receive the death penalty. In anger, Bill shoots Dr. Jones dead. However, Hughes returns to prison with a sudden change of heart, stating that the Centipede punishment is "exactly what America needs." After Hughes leaves, Dwight and Bill celebrate their success. Dwight is then shot and killed by Bill for trying to take credit for the idea.

In the final scene, a naked Bill screams with joy in the lookout tower overlooking the Centipede while the Star-Spangled Banner plays.

=== Alternate ending (Blu-ray version) ===
In an alternate ending, Doctor Josef Heiter lies in his bed, implying that the previous events were part of a dream. He finds his three rottweilers, his first centipede creation, deceased. The camera pans over his house and the film transitions into the beginning of The Human Centipede (First Sequence).

== Cast ==
- Dieter Laser as Bill Boss, the prison warden of George H.W. Bush State Prison
- Laurence R. Harvey as Dwight Butler, Bill's accountant
- Robert LaSardo as Inmate 297
- Tommy "Tiny" Lister, Jr. as Inmate 178
- Jay Tavare as Inmate 346
- Eric Roberts as Governor Hughes, the governor of the unidentified state who is Bill's boss
- Bree Olson as Daisy, Bill's secretary
- Clayton Rohner as Dr. Jones
- Tom Six as Himself
- Hamzah Saman as Inmate 093
- Peter Blankenstein as Inmate 106
- Carlos Ramirez as Inmate 109
- Bill Hutchens as Inmate 488
- Chris Clanton as Prisoner
- Akihiro Kitamura as Inmate 333
- Basil Firea as Inmate 310
- Daniel TwoFeathers as Stabbed Prison Guard

== Production ==
Six noted that casting for the third film was much easier than the first, as more people were familiar with the concept and wanted to appear in the film. To this end, Eric Roberts was easier to attract to the film, because according to Six, he was a fan of the original. Six decided to cast porn actress Bree Olson because he wanted a female character, even though the movie was set in an all-male prison, and wanted "the ultimate American female," which he believed to be a porn actress. Both Laser and Harvey had starred in previous entries as the main antagonists, Dr. Josef Heiter and Martin, respectively.

Six chose a prison setting to bring back the theme of "punishment" that generated the idea for the series, although Six admits that "I totally ignored [it] in the first two films." Six filmed the movie in the style of "a Hollywood film," which according to him meant shooting "everything widescreen with over-the-top color grading and big Hollywood music," after receiving encouragement to do so from film festival audiences. Six noted that this helped bring out how "ridiculous" the concept was.

Six has stated that some of the crew members did not agree to put their full names in the credits, and adding these same members did not have such reservations about the second part. In order to promote the film, Six distributed 250 hand-signed prints of the film in March 2015.

Production of the film was briefly delayed due to a dispute between Six and Laser. Six claimed that Laser had agreed to appear in the film and praised the script but later demanded extensive changes and withdrew from the project only weeks before filming was scheduled to begin. Laser disputed this, claiming that he signed on before reading the script and had only seen a brief story outline. According to Laser, the script was delivered several months later than promised, after the film had already been announced, and he was unhappy with how his character was written. He proposed a number of revisions, which Six rejected, leading to a public disagreement and threats of a lawsuit for breach of contract. The dispute was eventually resolved in early 2013.

== Release ==
On 7 April 2015, Entertainment Weekly announced the film's theatrical and video on demand release date to be 22 May 2015.

The film passed uncut in Australia on 6 May, with an R18+ rating, and screened in a national tour throughout June, with Harvey appearing as a special guest. The film was released on DVD and Blu-ray in Australia on 22 July 2015.

Despite controversy over the second film in the franchise, the film passed uncut in the UK with an 18 certificate and in New Zealand with an R18 certificate. It was released in the UK on 20 July.

The Japanese version's theme song is "Krazy" by Raychell feat. RICKY & RABBIE.

== Reception ==
The Human Centipede 3 was near-universally panned by critics. On review aggregate website Rotten Tomatoes, the film has a 20% rating based on 46 reviews with an average rating of 2.2/10. The site's critical consensus states that "Human Centipede fans may find enough extreme body horror in the third installment to satisfy, but filmgoers of every other persuasion are strongly advised to stay far, far away from Final Sequence." Metacritic reports an average score of 5 out of 100, indicating "overwhelming dislike" from 15 critics.

Entertainment Weekly ranked the film as the second worst movie of 2015, specifying, "sleazy sadism served with a wink and a smile, Six’s anus-to-mouth trilogy is a satire without any clue of what it’s satirizing." Additionally, The A.V. Club also ranked the film as the second worst of 2015, declaring, "Writer-director Tom Six lives for disapproval, and he’s finally made a movie that basically no one—not even those amused or unnerved by the past two installments—could possibly enjoy."

In his review for Variety, Dennis Harvey noted, "As with earlier chapters, the packaging is as competent (if not particularly inspired) as the content is remedial. Indeed, perhaps the series' only really good joke has been the inherent absurdism of seeing an ever-rising level of expense, polish, and now "name" actors applied to something so fundamentally dumb." Eddie Goldberger of New York Daily News concluded his review with, "The movie passes time until it can get to the centipeding. Even the big namesake event, when it finally arrives, is ho-hum. Turns out, whether it’s three people stuck together or 500, if you’ve seen one human centipede, you’ve seen them all."

The New York Times critic Jeannette Catsoulis said of the film, "An ugly, claustrophobic celebration of sexual violence that’s anchored by one of the most repellent characters ever to appear on screen: the prison warden Bill Boss. Portrayed by Dieter Laser, Boss is a capering obscenity whose oft-protruding tongue deserves its own agent."

Greg Cwik of Indiewire gave the film a C− and said: "Final Sequence is too self-serious to be camp, but too silly to be scary, so Six just settles for gross."

=== Home media ===
The Human Centipede 3 (Final Sequence) was released on DVD and Blu-ray on 27 October 2015 in the United States. Additionally, a Blu-ray box set containing all of the films was released on the same day. The film was released on 4K UHD on 22 October 2026 by Umbrella Entertainment.

=== Accolades ===
At the 36th Golden Raspberry Awards, Final Sequence was nominated for Worst Prequel, Remake, Rip-off or Sequel with Six being nominated for Worst Director.

== Future ==
Although Tom Six openly stated he viewed The Human Centipede as a trilogy, he told Bloody Disgusting in an interview in 2019 that if he had to make a fourth installment, he did have some ideas. Six said, "If I had to make a fourth one, which I might do in 20 years from now, who knows, it will be about connecting all starving Africans on the African continent done by a charity organisation, to solve the hunger problem. Or about aliens connecting the whole human race!"

Tom Six later revealed that he had written a script for a potential spin-off film titled The Human Caterpillar, a reference to a scene from The Human Centipede 3 (Final Sequence) where sewed prison inmates had their limbs amputated so they resemble a caterpillar. Furthermore, Six stated that the concept of The Human Centipede would appear in future projects in some form.
