= Laurence R. Harvey =

Actor

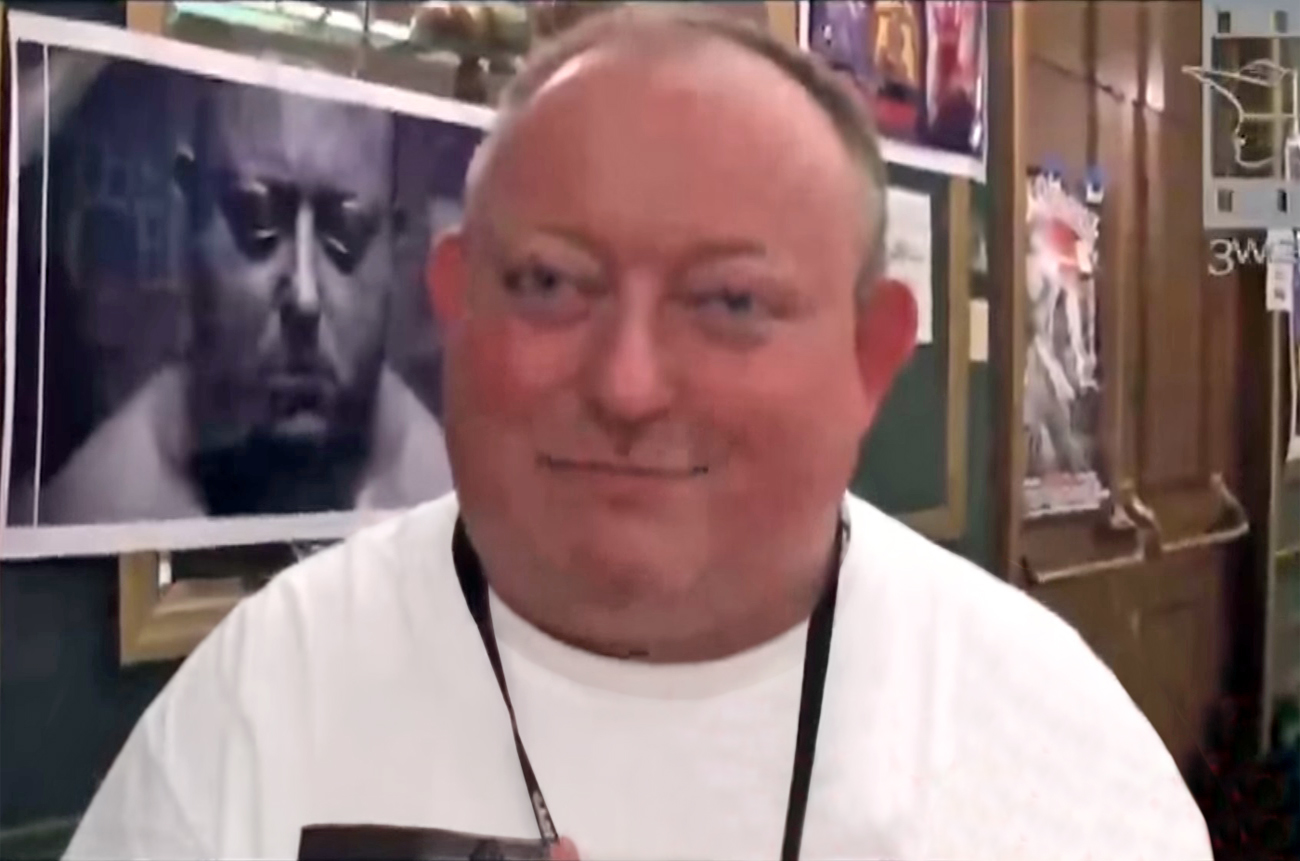
- Harvey in 2012
- Born: 17 July 1970 (age 55); Wigan, Lancashire, England
- Occupation: Actor

Laurence Robert Harvey (born 17 July 1970) is an English actor. He is best known for his roles in the horror films The Human Centipede 2 (Full Sequence) (2011) and The Human Centipede 3 (Final Sequence) (2015).

== Career ==
Harvey is best known for portraying Martin Lomax in the horror film The Human Centipede 2 (Full Sequence), directed by Tom Six. In the film, Martin is an obese, asthmatic, and mentally challenged security guard for a multi-storey car park, who is obsessed with the original film.

Harvey also appears in The Human Centipede 3 (Final Sequence) in a different role than the second film. He also played alongside Tristan Risk in Jill Sixx Gevargizian's directing debut Call Girl. In 2015, Harvey was cast along with Tristan Risk and Ellie Church for Frankenstein Created Bikers.

== Filmography ==
- The Pizza Miracle (2010)
- Ham and Onions (2011)
- The Human Centipede 2 (Full Sequence) (2011)
- King of Thebes (2012)
- Cool as Hell (2013)
- The ABCs of Death 2 (2014)
- The Editor (2014)
- My Bloody Banjo (2015)
- Dead Love (2015)
- English Mary (2015)
- House of Many Sorrows (2015)
- The Human Centipede 3 (Final Sequence) (2015)
- Boogeyman: Reincarnation (2015)
- Kindred Spirits (2015)
- Redacted (2015)
- Frankenstein Created Bikers (2015)
- Elephant Man of War (2016)
- Egomaniac (2016)
- Made Ordinary (2017)
- Dark Web (2017)
- Attack of the Adult Babies (2017)
- For We Are Many (2019)
- House of Many Sorrows (2020)
- A Little More Flesh II (2021)
- Torture (2021)
- Eating Miss Campbell (2022)
- Ribspreader (2022)
- Artifacts of Fear (2023)
- Secrets of a Wallaby Boy (2023)
- Serial (2025)
- Doctor Deathface (2025)

== Awards and nominations ==
=== Nominations ===
Fright Meter Awards

- Best Actor: 2011.
