= Eating Miss Campbell =

- Directed by: Liam Regan
- Written by: Liam Regan
- Produced by: Liam Regan; Lloyd Kaufman
- Starring: Lyndsey Craine; Lala Barlow; Vito Trigo; Laurence R. Harvey; James Hamer-Morton; Charlie Bond; Emily Haigh; Michaela Longden; Sierra Summers; Alexander J Skinner; Justin A. Martell; Annabella Rich; Dani Thompson; Blade Braxton
- Cinematography: Hamish Saks
- Edited by: Jack Hayes
- Music by: Joe Renzetti
- Production companies: Refuse Films; Troma Entertainment; Dereks Dont Run Films
- Distributed by: Refuse Films (United Kingdom); Troma Entertainment (United States)
- Release date: 26 August 2022 (FrightFest)
- Running time: 84 minutes
- Country: United Kingdom
- Language: English

Eating Miss Campbell is a 2022 British comedy horror film directed and written by Liam Regan, starring Lyndsey Craine, Lala Barlow, Vito Trigo, Laurence R. Harvey, James Hamer-Morton, Charlie Bond, Emily Haigh, Michaela Longden, Sierra Summers, Alexander J Skinner, Justin A. Martell, Annabella Rich, Dani Thompson and Blade Braxton.

== Plot ==
Beth Conner is a 17-year-old vegan goth student at Henenlotter High School in England which is prone to school shootings. She keeps committing suicide in order to wake up in a romantic comedy movie but, to her annoyance, keeps waking up in a low-budget horror movie which she hates. The school is introduced to the new American headmaster Mr. Sawyer, who was hired thanks to his involvement in stopping the infamous Reams for Less Massacre, (Note: As depicted in My Bloody Banjo (2015)) announces an “All You Can Eat Massacre” in which the winner will get to either shoot up the school or shoot themselves. Sawyer also introduces the new English teacher, Miss. Campbell who is also American. Beth develops a crush on her.

In class, Beth is harassed by popular student Ethan Rembrandt and ends up biting his finger off, developing a taste for human flesh. Beth's father Mark and stepmother Frankie Sullivan tell Beth to invite Ethan around to settle things. When Ethan comes over, he tries to roofie Beth who instead roofies him and ends up eating him. Meanwhile, Campbell is seduced by Clyde Toulon, the Human Resources representative of Henenlotter High School and Sawyer's best friend. However, she bites his penis off and decapitates him. The next day, Campbell takes Beth to the local diner where she reveals that she suffers from erotophonophilia before killing a waitress and presenting Clyde's head for Beth to eat. The two begin a secret relationship.

After getting caught kissing on the school bus, American faculty member Nancy Applegate seemingly sends Campbell back to America on a hijacked plane. Enraged, Beth enters the All You Can Eat Massacre so she can commit suicide and finally escape the horror movie genre. That night, Campbell kidnaps and kills Nancy. Meanwhile, Clarissa, the sadistic leader of The Mean Girls, plans to sabotage the All You Can Eat Massacre so that she will win and be able to kill the outcasts of Henenlotter High School including Beth. Sawyer is fired after the school board discovers his girlfriend, school secretary Deetz Montgomery, had been sleeping with Ethan. Campbell wakes up Beth on her 18th birthday and tranquillises her in front of her parents. When she wakes up, she finds out that her family and Campbell are part of a cannibalistic cult who ate her mother years ago. When they try to eat Beth, she breaks free, kills Frankie and her father and chases after Campbell.

Beth arrives at Henenlotter High School where she kills Campbell and serves her as food for the All You Can Eat Massacre (hosted by boxing promoter The Midnight Rose) allowing her to win due to her cannibalistic nature and heritage. Sawyer snaps from his firing, Clyde's death and Deetz's betrayal and shoots up the school killing multiple students and staff, including Deetz. Beth shoots Sawyer who gives her his respect before dying. Having won the All You Can Eat Massacre and saving the school, Beth shoots herself in the head and seemingly wakes up in a romantic comedy. However, she finds Ethan's severed head in the fridge. Campbell's voice tells her that a sequel has been greenlit in which Beth finds herself on the set of as she expresses her disdain towards low-budget horror movies.

== Cast ==
- Lyndsey Craine as Beth Conner
- Lala Barlow as Miss Campbell
- Vito Trigo as Mr. Sawyer
- Laurence R. Harvey as Clyde Toulon
- James Hamer-Morton as Mark Conner
- Charlie Bond as Frankie Sullivan
- Emily Haigh as Clarissa
- Michaela Longden as Melissa Lee-Ray
- Sierra Summers as Sabrina
- Alexander J Skinner as Ethan Rembrandt
- Justin A. Martell as Tusk Everbone
- Annabella Rich as Nancy Applegate
- Dani Thompson as Deetz Montgomery
- Blade Braxton as Midnight Rose
- Lloyd Kaufman as Dr. Samuel Weil
- Sarah Waldron as Sandy
- Jessica McDonagh as Cassandra
- Symren Gharial as Marcus
- Paris Rivers as Byron Law
- Ria Fend as Phoebe

== Release ==
The film premiered at FrightFest on 26 August 2022.

== Reception ==
David Gelmini of Dread Central rated the film 4 stars out of 5 and wrote that it "might just be one of the best high school cannibal movies ever to have been produced."

PopHorror called the film a "hilarious, knives-out, balls-to-the-wall blood fest from beginning to end."

Martin Unsworth of Starburst praised the "spot-on satire on American high school life", the performances and the cinematography.
