= Chris Clanton =

American actor

Chris Clanton is an American actor best known for appearing in The Wire (2002–2008).

== Career ==
Clanton had a recurring role as Savino Bratton in seasons one and five of The Wire. He is credited as Christopher J. Clanton in the fifth season. He also had an uncredited role in The Corner as a street kid. Chris played the lead character Torn Pettigrew in the 2009 independent film TORN which was written and directed by Richard Johnson and produced by Corey Williams. In 2015, Clanton appeared in Tom Six's Dutch horror film The Human Centipede 3. In 2014, he also founded Hunted Foxx Entertainment a boutique production company with a focus on indie films.

== Personal life ==
In 2006, Clanton pled guilty to drug related charges and was sentenced to five years, four of which were suspended and three years of probation. In 2008, Clanton was stabbed in the chest and buttocks at the Overlea Event Center nightclub in Baltimore. Clanton was arrested again in 2019 after allegedly escaping police custody and violating a protective order.

In May 2021, Clanton was shot in the ear in Baltimore. He said he believes he was not the intended target.

== Filmography ==
=== Film ===
Year	Title	Role	Notes
2009	Torn	Torn Pettigrew	
2010	Razorblade City	Bling Bling	
2010	King of Baltimore	Tyrell	
2011	All in the Game	Vince	
2012	LUV	Flashlight Guy	
2013	Sleeping with Fate	Kendal Fate	Also director and producer
2015	San Andreas Quake	Resnick	
2015	Mega Shark Versus Kolossus	Section Chief Steve Hardin	
2015	The Human Centipede 3	Prisoner	Uncredited

=== Television ===
Year	Title	Role	Notes
2002–2008	The Wire	Savino Bratton	9 episodes
2014	Sex Sent Me to the ER	Jamar	Episode: "Forbidden Fruit"
2022	We Own This City	Brian Hairston	6 episodes
