= The Human Centipede 2 (Full Sequence) =

2011 film by Tom Six

- Theatrical release poster
- Directed by: Tom Six
- Written by: Tom Six
- Produced by: Tom Six; Ilona Six
- Starring: Ashlynn Yennie; Laurence R. Harvey
- Cinematography: David Meadows
- Edited by: Tom Six
- Music by: James Edward Barker
- Production company: Six Entertainment Company
- Distributed by: Bounty Films (United Kingdom)
- Release dates: 22 September 2011 (Fantastic Fest); 4 November 2011 (United Kingdom)
- Running time: 88 minutes (International version); 84 minutes (BBFC cut); 91 minutes (Unrated director's cut)
- Countries: United Kingdom; Netherlands
- Language: English
- Box office: $170,323

The Human Centipede 2 (Full Sequence) is a 2011 psychological body horror film written, directed, and co-produced by Tom Six. An international co-production of the Netherlands and the United Kingdom, and the sequel to Six's 2009 film The Human Centipede (First Sequence), the film stars Laurence R. Harvey as a psychiatrically and intellectually impaired English man who watches and becomes obsessed with the first Human Centipede film, and decides to make his own "centipede" consisting of 12 people by using crude and violent techniques to connect their lips to each other's buttocks, including Ashlynn Yennie, an actress from the first film.

The Human Centipede 2 (Full Sequence) received substantial attention and controversy for its graphic depictions of violence, sexual violence, forced defecation, and overall body horror. It was subject to heavy censorship throughout the world where it was sometimes edited to remove objectionable content or banned altogether. It was critically panned, with much criticism focused on its acting, plot, editing, and violence, although Harvey's performance received some praise from critics.

== Plot ==
In the tollbooth of a parking garage in East London, Martin Lomax is watching The Human Centipede (First Sequence), a film he is obsessed with, on his laptop. Short, obese, asthmatic, and mentally challenged, Martin lives in an unkempt council flat with his emotionally abusive mother, who blames him for having his father put in prison for physically, psychologically, and sexually abusing Martin when he was a boy. Dr. Sebring, Martin's psychiatrist, touches him inappropriately, and prescribes him heavy medication.

During a home appointment with Dr. Sebring, Mrs. Lomax talks about her son's unsettling discussion of creating a twelve-person centipede. Dr. Sebring says that Martin's obsession with a twelve-person centipede, as well as Martin's pet centipede, is a "phase", relating the pain of a centipede's bite and phallic shape to the sexual abuse he endured at the hands of his father. Mrs. Lomax remains resentful and apathetic towards Martin.

Martin acquires a dingy warehouse after killing the owner and landlord, and begins abducting people to use for a twelve-person human centipede. His victims include a young couple, a man and his pregnant wife, and two drunk girls who catch Martin masturbating with sandpaper. Martin's mother finds and destroys his scrapbook in disgust after unsuccessfully attempting a murder-suicide. When Mrs. Lomax attempts to dispose of his centipede, Martin throws his centipede on her face, which bites her. After killing her by bludgeoning her head with a crowbar, Martin then lures his detested neighbour, Dick, to the scene, before shooting and kidnapping him.

Back at the tollbooth, Martin catches Dr. Sebring and a taxicab driver having sex (as well as oral sex with a prostitute) on one of the CCTV security cameras. Martin kills Sebring in a fit of rage and abducts the others. Martin's final victim is Ashlynn Yennie, the actress who played Jenny in The Human Centipede, whom Martin lures under false pretenses of being Quentin Tarantino's casting agent.

Martin assembles his "centipede". Following his notes and sketches from The Human Centipede, Martin severs the ligaments in each person's knees to prevent them from fleeing and uses a hammer to knock out their teeth. Martin initially tries to mutilate the buttocks of each victim. When he cuts into the buttocks of one victim too deeply, it causes him to bleed to death. Instead of surgical tools, Martin uses a staple gun and duct tape to attach each person's lips to the next person's buttocks. The pregnant woman, who was planned to be the front of the centipede out of sympathy for her pregnancy, is presumed dead; Martin places her in the corner. Martin's "human centipede" is ultimately ten people long with Ashlynn in front.

Martin experiments by having his centipede walk around and force-feeds Ashlynn cream-of-mushroom soup using the funnel and tube when she refuses to eat from the dog bowl. Disturbed by Ashlynn's screams, he tears her tongue out with pliers. Martin soon starts rubbing on his victims' stomachs in hopes that they defecate. When they don't, this angers Martin. He then injects each victim with a laxative, forcing them to uncontrollably and violently defecate into the mouth of the person behind them in a chain-like reaction, causing all the victims to swallow each other's excrement, much to Martin's excitement. He wraps his genitals in barbed wire and rapes the woman at the back of the centipede. The pregnant woman awakens and runs outside screaming, in labour. She leaps into a victim's car and gives birth. When Martin pursues her, she stomps on the accelerator, crushing her baby's skull in the process, and drives away.

Martin returns to the warehouse and finds that the centipede has separated into two halves after one victim was able to free his lips from another victim's buttocks. Furious that his centipede is ruined, Martin kills the victims via gunshot and stabbing with a knife. As he hesitates to kill Ashlynn, she punches him in the crotch and shoves the funnel into his rectum, before dropping his pet centipede into it. Martin fatally stabs her in the neck and staggers out in agony.

== Cast ==
- Laurence R. Harvey as Martin Lomax, a short, fat, asthmatic, and mentally challenged man in his 40s who becomes obsessed with First Sequence. Martin does not actually have any dialogue in the film except for a few laughs and moans.
- Ashlynn Yennie as Miss Yennie / Human centipede No. 1: Martin captures Yennie by flying her over from America thinking she was auditioning for a Quentin Tarantino film. She plays as a fictionalized version of herself and is in the front of the centipede, acting as the head.
- Maddi Black as Candy / Human centipede No. 2, a prostitute who is kidnapped by Martin while performing oral sex on Dr. Sebring in a cab that was driven by Paul. She is placed behind Ashlynn and is forced to consume her excrement.
- Kandace Caine as Karrie / Human centipede No. 3, a woman who is captured by Martin after coming from a party drunk along with Valerie. She is placed behind Candy and is forced to consume her excrement.
- Dominic Borrelli as Paul / Human centipede No. 4, an overweight cab driver that buys Candy for himself and Dr. Sebring, but is taken by Martin along with Candy. He is placed behind Karrie and is forced to consume her excrement. He is the only male that is placed behind a female.
- Lucas Hansen as Ian / Human centipede No. 5, an aggressive and abusive young man who is the boyfriend of Kim. He is placed behind Paul and is forced to consume his excrement.
- Lee Nicholas Harris as Dick / Human centipede No. 6, the aggressive upstairs neighbor of Martin and his mother, who has threatened them with violence when the mother complains about his loud music. He is placed behind Ian and is forced to consume his excrement. He causes the centipede to split into two after he frees his lips from Ian's buttocks.
- Dan Burman as Greg / Human centipede No. 7, a young man who is the first victim and is first seen gagged and unconscious in Martin's van at the beginning of the film. He is placed behind Dick and is forced to consume his excrement.
- Daniel Jude Gennis as Tim / Human centipede No. 8, a rich man. When he and his pregnant wife Rachel are abducted by Martin, their young child is left crying in their car for the rest of the film. He is placed behind Greg and is forced to consume his excrement.
- Georgia Goodrick as Valerie / Human centipede No. 9, a woman who is captured by Martin after coming from a party drunk along with Karrie. She is placed behind Tim and is forced to consume his excrement. She is the only female who is placed behind a male.
- Emma Lock as Kim / Human centipede No. 10: The girlfriend of Ian. She is placed behind Valerie and is forced to consume her excrement. She acts as the functioning anus of the centipede. She is sexually abused by Martin, being forcibly penetrated anally with barbed wire.
- Katherine Templar as Rachel / Human centipede No. 11, a pregnant woman and Tim's wife, who is abducted by Martin. She was planned to be in the front of the centipede out of sympathy for her pregnancy, but she escapes after being presumed dead by Martin.
- Peter Blankenstein as Alan / Human centipede No. 12, a man who is taken by Martin when he complains about the ATM having no cash. He bleeds to death after Martin mutilates his buttocks. He was supposed to be in between Valerie and Kim in the centipede.
- Bill Hutchens as Dr. Sebring, Martin's psychiatrist.
- Vivien Bridson as Mrs. Lomax, Martin's mother.
- Peter Charlton as Jake, the lessor of the warehouse Martin uses for his "centipede". Martin wanted to use him for his centipede, but he accidentally kills him.
Additionally Ashley C. Williams and Akihiro Kitamura appear as Lindsay and Katsuro from the first movie and as themselves in photographs only, respectively.

== Production ==
Director Tom Six stated in 2010 that he was working on a sequel to The Human Centipede (First Sequence), as well as a possible third film depending upon its success. He said that the plot would follow on from the first film, but with a centipede made from 12 people as opposed to the three victims of the first. The tag-line would be "100% medically inaccurate", in contrast to his "100% medically accurate" claim for the first film. Six stated the sequel would be much more graphic and disturbing, making the first film seem like "My Little Pony compared with part two."

Speculation regarding the plot of Full Sequence grew after the Weekend of Horrors convention in May 2010, when Ashlynn Yennie and Akihiro Kitamura, who had starred in First Sequence, hinted that their characters might return for the sequel despite their deaths in First Sequence. Additionally, Ashley C. Williams, whose character was left alive at the end of First Sequence, stated in September 2010 that she was shooting a horror film in Britain, which led to speculation from FEARnet that she is reprising her role of Lindsay. In a further interview, Yennie confirmed Six's statement that the sequel would contain "the blood and shit" which viewers did not see in the first film. Mark Hamill was offered an undisclosed role in the film, but turned it down as he was "disgusted" by the premise.

Six was inspired to make the movie a metafilm after reporters kept asking him if he worried about people committing copycat crimes inspired by the first film. Although he had previously considered the concept for a possible sequel, the questions cemented his idea.

According to Six, he intentionally made Full Sequence very different from First Sequence for two reasons. First, when he was writing the script of First Sequence, he knew people would want more "blood and shit" than is shown. Second, the two parts reflect the different characters: the coloured First Sequence, with a slow-moving camera, fit the story of Dr. Heiter, while Martin Lomax's character required a "dark and dirty" film. Six shot Full Sequence in colour, but "was always thinking about black and white" and realized while editing that it was "much scarier" that way. It was also Six's idea to have little dialogue in the film's second half, except for moans, screams, grunts, flatulence, whimpers, and Martin either laughing or crying.

Principal photography for Full Sequence began in London in June 2010 with a largely British cast. A teaser trailer was released on 24 September, in which Six introduced Martin, a man wearing a cardboard box over his head, as the new doctor.

== Release ==
=== United States ===
The film had its United States premiere at Fantastic Fest in Austin, Texas, on 22 September 2011. The film's distributor, IFC Films, gave audience members complimentary barf bags at the screening, and stationed an ambulance outside the theater as a gimmick. However, one audience member became so physically ill during the premiere that paramedics had to assist her.

The film began a limited theatrical release in the United States on 7 October 2011. It was released unrated and only had midnight showings. The film was released in an "unrated director's cut" on DVD and Blu-ray on 14 February 2012; the film runs a total of 91 minutes.

A full-colour version of the film was released for the first time in the United States on 27 October 2015, exclusively on The Human Centipede: The Complete Sequence Blu-ray set.

In April 2016, a Tennessee high school teacher was suspended after the film was played during class. Tom Six responded by tweeting "It should be mandatory to watch THC2 in school classes...It deals with a character that is bullied and what to do!" Six also said that he would be giving the teacher an autographed copy of the film.

The film was released on 4K UHD on 22 October 2026 by Umbrella Entertainment.

=== Censorship ===
==== United Kingdom ====
In June 2011, the British Board of Film Classification (BBFC) refused to classify The Human Centipede 2 (Full Sequence) for a direct-to-video release, effectively meaning that the film could not legally be supplied in any format in the UK. The BBFC had given the preceding First Sequence title an 18 certificate. The Board stated that they had considered First Sequence to be "undoubtedly tasteless and disgusting", but deemed it acceptable for release because the "centipede" was the product of a "revolting medical experiment". By contrast, the BBFC report on Full Sequence stated that the film's content was too extreme for an 18 certificate and was "sexually violent, and potentially obscene". The board members felt that the centipede of Full Sequence existed purely as "the object of the protagonist's depraved sexual fantasy". They criticised the film for making "little attempt to portray any of the victims in the film as anything other than objects to be brutalised and degraded for the amusement and sexual arousal of the main character and for the pleasure of the viewer", and stated their opinion that the film was potentially in breach of the Obscene Publications Act. The BBFC initially suggested that cutting the film would not affect the decision, "as the unacceptable material featured throughout".

Tom Six responded to the BBFC's decision in a statement released the next day:

Thank you BBFC for putting spoilers of my movie on your website and thank you for banning my film in this exceptional way. Apparently I made an [sic] horrific horror-film, but shouldn't a good horror film be horrific? My dear people it is a fucking MOVIE. It is all fictional. Not real. It is all make-belief [sic]. It is art. Give people their own choice to watch it or not. If people can't handle or like my movies they just don't watch them. If people like my movies they have to be able to see it any time, anywhere also in the UK.

Eureka Entertainment, the film's UK distributor, issued a statement criticising the ban, echoing Six's sentiments about the revelation of plot details in the BBFC's report, and announcing their intention to appeal to the Video Appeals Committee.

In October 2011, the BBFC ultimately granted the film an 18 certificate for "very strong bloody violence and gore, and sexual violence" after 32 compulsory cuts were made, totalling 2 minutes and 37 seconds. Sir Quentin Thomas, president of the BBFC, stated:

When we first examined this work earlier this year we judged that, as submitted, it was unsuitable for classification; and, as we explained to the company, we could not ourselves see how cuts could produce a viable and classifiable work. That remains the view of one of our Vice Presidents, Gerard Lemos, who is therefore abstaining from the Board's collective decision. The company lodged an appeal against our decision to refuse classification. In the course of preparations for that appeal, the company proposed a number of cuts which it was right for us to consider. In response, after further examination, we proposed a more extensive series of cuts. These cuts produce a work which many will find difficult but which I believe can properly be classified at the adult level. The company has now accepted these cuts, withdrawn its appeal and the work has been classified, as cut, at 18.

The sales director of Eureka Entertainment supported the decision, stating:

We are really pleased that after nearly four months of detailed discussion and debate, we have been able to reach an agreement with the BBFC and to produce a very viable cut of the film which will both excite and challenge its fans. Naturally we have a slight disappointment that we have had to make cuts, but we feel that the storyline has not been compromised and the level of horror has been sustained.

==== Australia and New Zealand ====
In May 2011, the uncut film was originally granted an R18+ classification by the Australian Classification Board (ACB). However, this decision was later overruled after Minister for Justice Brendan O'Connor asked for a review of the rating by the Australian Classification Review Board. On 28 November 2011, the film was reviewed and by unanimous decision of a three-person board, refused classification.

Several groups and individuals, including FamilyVoice Australia, Collective Shout and Cardinal George Pell, the Archbishop of Sydney, welcomed the decision. Monster Pictures, the Australian distributor of the film, criticised the decision and announced their intention to re-edit and re-submit the film for review.

On 13 December 2011, the ACB classified a modified version of the film at R18+ for "high impact themes, violence and sexual violence". Monster Pictures expressed their "delight", and clarified that thirty seconds of the film had been "modified". They concluded that "this decision highlights the absurdity of Classification Review Board's decision to ban the film in the first place."

Due to the reaction by Australian film authorities, the film was not submitted for theatrical distribution in New Zealand. However, in April 2012, the DVD version was classified as "objectionable" (banned) by the New Zealand Office of Film & Literature Classification.

== Reception ==
=== Box office ===
The Human Centipede 2 (Full Sequence) opened at 45th place with $49,456, for an average of $2,748, in the 18 theaters where it premiered. With four theaters added the next weekend, the film dropped a modest 29.9% with $34,679. Its third weekend saw a 56.2% drop despite having two more theaters added. However, in its fourth weekend, the film lost 12 theaters, causing a 61.9% drop ($5,792). In its final weekend, it grossed $2,267, putting the movie's resting spot at No. 95 for the weekend.

The film grossed $5,824 in Iceland and $1,511 in the United Kingdom. Released in Peru in April 2012, the horror picture grossed $21,111 there. At the end of its run, the film made $141,877, about half of what the previous installment had grossed.

=== Critical response ===
The film has a rating of 28% at Rotten Tomatoes based on 81 reviews, with a weighted average of 3.28/10. The site's consensus reads: "The Human Centipede II (Full Sequence) attempts to weave in social commentary but as the movie wears on, it loses its ability to repulse and shock and ends up obnoxious and annoying." At Metacritic, it rates 17 out of 100, indicating "overwhelming dislike", based on 22 reviews.

Giving it a score of 7 out of 10, Bloody Disgusting writer Brad Miska said the film was a "brilliant response to critics of his first film. It makes a strong statement that it's just a movie and that people take his work way too seriously, while also implementing a unique concept". Miska added that he "found it an intensely engaging and absolutely hilarious meta experience that gets its point across with flying colors", but was critical of the script's lack of depth. Entertainment Weekly writer Owen Gleiberman gave the film a B+ rating, stating that viewers "may feel gripped by the horror of what you're seeing and the terror of what's coming". Gleiberman noted how "The scatological climax would have the Marquis de Sade gagging into his popcorn." Writing in the New York Post, V. A. Musetto gave the film 3 out of 4 and said Full Sequence "is sick, disgusting and vile. (but) It's also demonically funny, stylish and ingenious."

Jen Yamato, writing for Movieline, criticized the film's excessive gore and the way director Tom Six seemed to dislike his own audience, specifying "It's not really a film one can or should 'enjoy', which is what Six seems to be telling his own audience, the fans who giggled through The Human Centipede and demanded more! Gorier! More extreme! Well, those people will get what they asked for." Eric Kohn, writing for indieWire, criticized the excessive grotesqueness of the film as well as Six's vanity. He stated, "Well, what if it turns someone's own body against them—is that a measure of success? To some degree, yes; it's designed to turn the tables on its own gore-hungry fans by depicting a fictionalized version of one of their own so revolting they think twice about their twisted tendencies. But it's so indulgently perverse, and so viscerally disturbing to watch—not to mention a painfully vain exercise in self-worship—that the lesson is incredibly hard-won. Take a word of warning, if you're on the fence; you don't have to see The Human Centipede II to know you don't want to see it."

Some reviewers found the extreme nature of the film boring. Robert Koehler, writing for Variety, found the gore so excessive that he termed it a form of lazy filmmaking. "More boring than stomach-churning, the film nevertheless contains scattered scenes and sequences so far beyond the tolerance of the squeamish that it can't be overstated; one, detailing the violent birth and death of a baby, is here simply to shock the most jaded of the jaded".

Reviewer Robert Saucedo of InsidePulse.com was more generous toward the film, but found its execution lacking. He wrote, "The film ... has a hint of intelligence hiding behind its beady little eyes. Smeared with blood and poo as it may be, this intelligence exposes a film that has something to say. The problem, unfortunately, is that director Tom Six is like a child—attempting to make a profound statement but unable to get it out eloquently or even in anything not resembling a whimper or a groan most of the time ... Who would have guessed? Human Centipede II is a treatise about horror fandom as delivered by a giggling, poop-infatuated toddler."

Mark Olsen, film critic for the Los Angeles Times, expressed concern over the film's conclusion as well as its basic premise. The conclusion (which he admits is open to interpretation; did Lomax commit these crimes or not?) leaves the audience either believing that the film is a "cop-out repudiation of everything that has come prior" or that even more graphic torture is coming in the third film. Regardless, Olsen concluded that writer-director Six has left himself with no good option for the third film.

Roger Ebert, of the Chicago Sun-Times, who did not assign a star rating to the original, gave this film zero stars on review, calling it "reprehensible, dismaying, ugly, artless and an affront to any notion, however remote, of human decency". He would later name it the worst movie of 2011.

In the UK, the reception of the film was just as hostile. Scott Weinberg and Catherine Shoard in The Guardian and Mark Kermode in The Observer praised the BBFC for heavily censoring the film, their only regret being that the BBFC could not make The Human Centipede 2 into a "better" film.

As with the first film, the medical accuracy was criticized, with Philip Coakley, then a medical doctor training to specialize in gastroenterology and the respiratory system, noting during an interview with Vice magazine that the procedure could lead to complications including vomiting, choking, pneumonia, asphyxia, hypothermia, dehydration, malnutrition, diarrhea, and diseases and infections such as Escherichia coli.

=== Accolades ===
The Human Centipede 2: Full Sequence, at the Fangoria Chainsaw Awards 2012, won as Worst Film and was nominated as Best Limited-Release/Direct-to-DVD Film.

== Sequel ==
Six stated that the third film would again be very different from the previous entry, but would also start with its ending, making the trilogy similar to a centipede. In the end, the parts of the trilogy form one continuous film about four and a half hours long. He also stated that the third film would answer some "lasting questions", have a strange happy ending, and is the last of the series, as he does not want to make any more Centipede films. In an interview with DreadCentral.com, Six said the third film would "make the last one look like a Disney film. We're going to shoot the third film entirely in America, and it's going to be my favorite ... It's going to upset a lot of people."

Around late 2012, actor Dieter Laser and Six ended their legal battle about creative differences, which had been ongoing since March 2012. Laser and Harvey returned for the third film, which is set in the United States, and played new characters. Six had said that the film would star a "big American celebrity", have "a storyline that nobody would expect", and feature a centipede consisting of 500+ people.

Filming commenced in May 2013, with Eric Roberts added to the cast. Other cast members include former pornographic actress Bree Olson, Robert LaSardo, and Tommy "Tiny" Lister, Jr. Filming concluded in June, with the film taking place in a prison. The official tagline for the film is "100% Politically Incorrect". The Human Centipede 3 (Final Sequence) was released both theatrically and through video on demand on 22 May 2015.

== See also ==
- List of banned films
- List of black-and-white films produced since 1966
- The Green Elephant, a 1999 film whose distribution was banned due to extreme violence
