= 36th Golden Raspberry Awards =

Award ceremony presented by the Golden Raspberry Award Foundation in 2015

- Awarded for: Worst in film
- Date: February 27, 2016
- Site: The Palace Theatre, Los Angeles, California

Highlights
- Worst Picture: Fantastic Four / Fifty Shades of Grey
- Most awards: Fifty Shades of Grey (5)
- Most nominations: Fifty Shades of Grey / Jupiter Ascending / Paul Blart: Mall Cop 2 / Pixels (6)

The 36th Golden Raspberry Awards, or Razzies, ceremony, held by the Golden Raspberry Foundation, identified the worst films the film industry had to offer in 2015. The nominations were revealed on January 13, 2016. The ceremony was held on February 27, 2016, beginning at 8:00 p.m. PST at the Palace Theater in Los Angeles, California.

== Ceremony ==
Fifty Shades of Grey received the most awards, winning Worst Picture, Worst Actor, Worst Actress, Worst Screen Combo and Worst Screenplay. Fantastic Four tied for Worst Picture, also receiving Worst Director and Worst Remake, Rip-off or Sequel. Eddie Redmayne received Worst Supporting Actor for Jupiter Ascending, while Kaley Cuoco received Worst Supporting Actress for Alvin and the Chipmunks: The Road Chip and The Wedding Ringer. The Razzie Redeemer Award, given to former Razzie winners and nominees for quality work in film, was given to Sylvester Stallone for his Oscar-nominated role in Creed after receiving seven Razzie awards in the past. The winners were announced via parody sketches; one of them was performed by an impersonation of Donald Trump, who won Worst Supporting Actor at the 11th Golden Raspberry Awards in 1990. None of the winners or nominees attended the ceremony. Per tradition, the nominations announcement and the ceremony took place one day before their corresponding 88th Academy Awards ceremony. The Razzie Redeemer Award winner was decided through a public vote on Rotten Tomatoes, while the 943 members of the Golden Raspberry Foundation voted to determine the winners for the other categories. Membership is open to the public for a membership fee.

== Winners and nominees ==
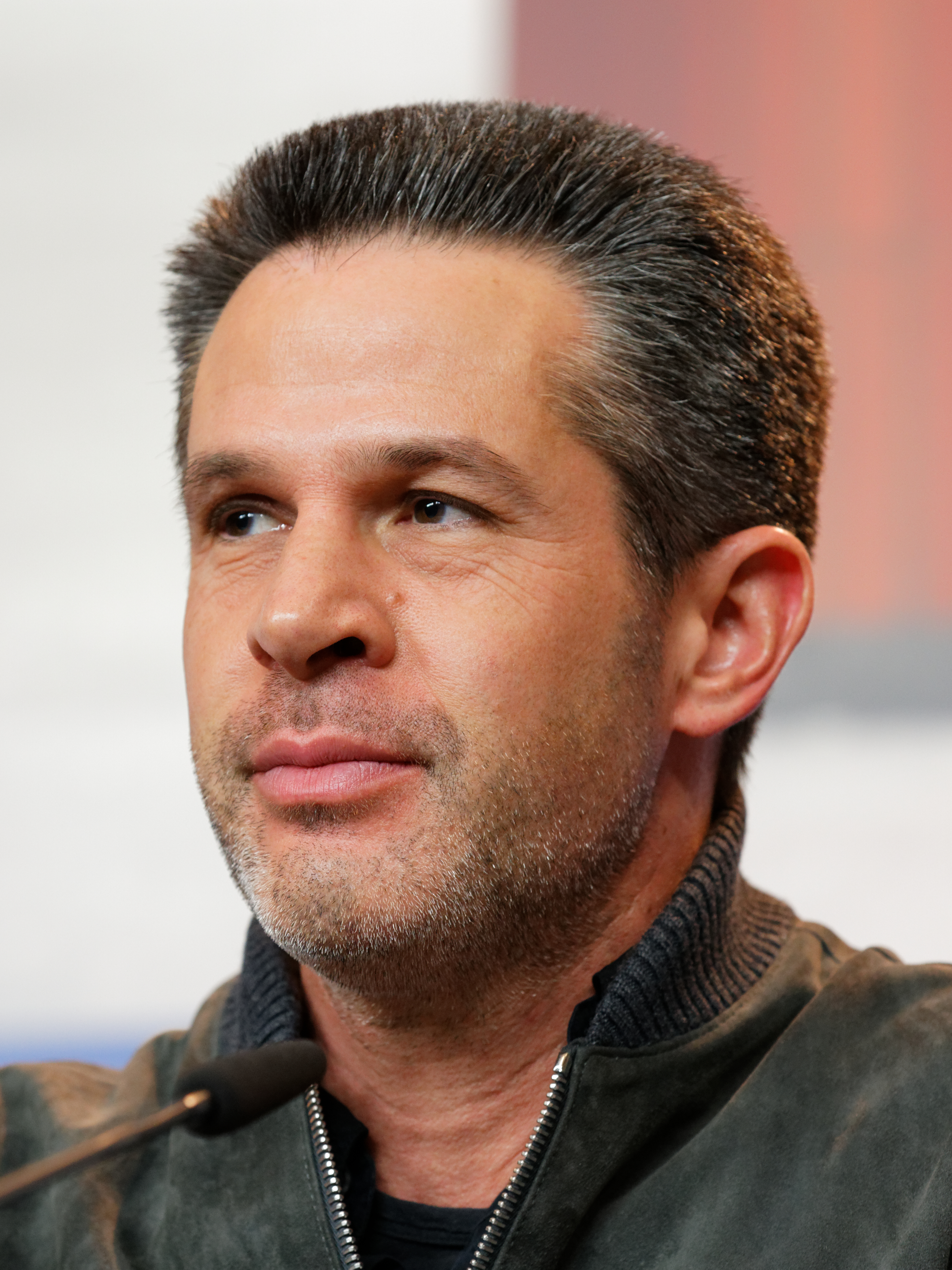
Simon Kinberg, Worst Picture and Worst Remake, Rip-off or Sequel co-winner

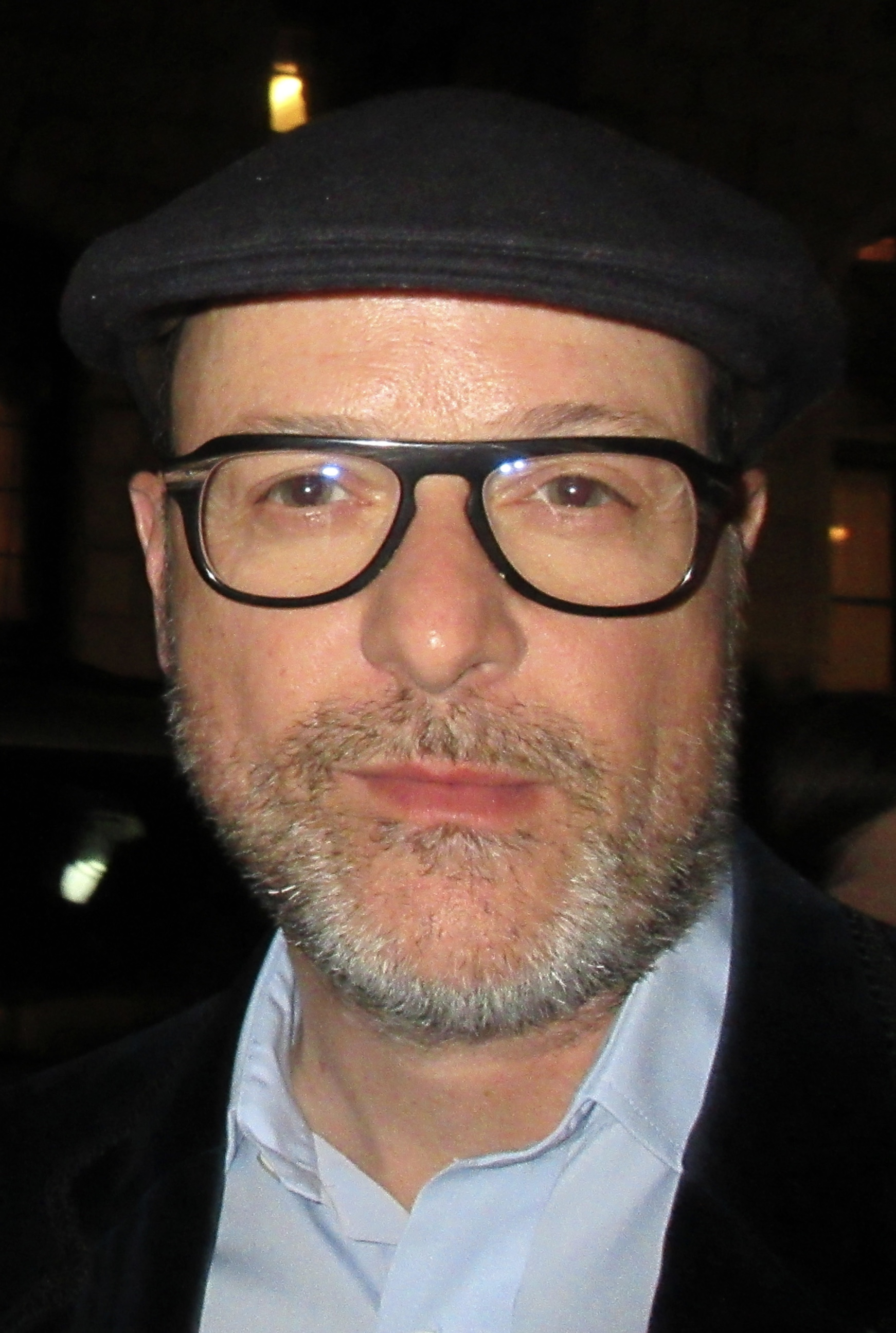
Matthew Vaughn, Worst Picture and Worst Remake, Rip-off or Sequel co-winner

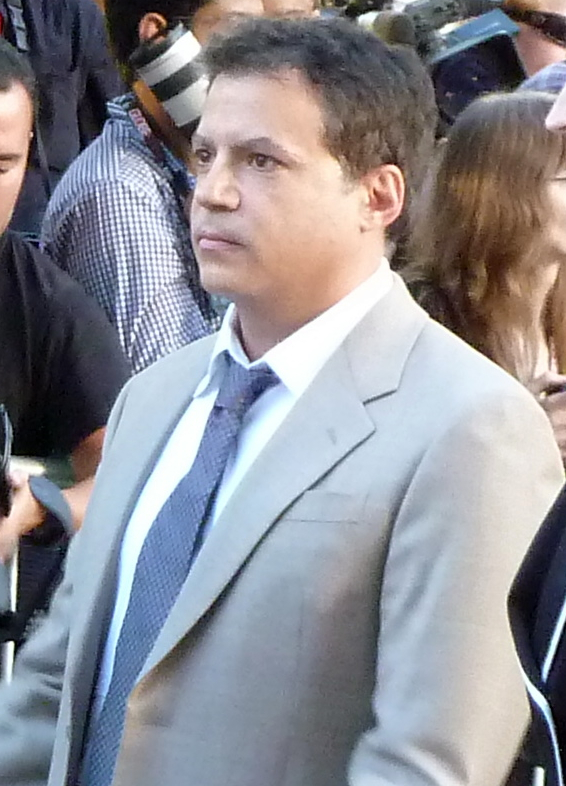
Michael De Luca, Worst Picture co-winner

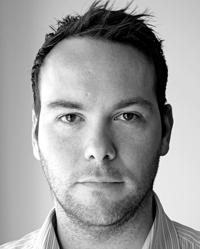
Dana Brunetti, Worst Picture co-winner

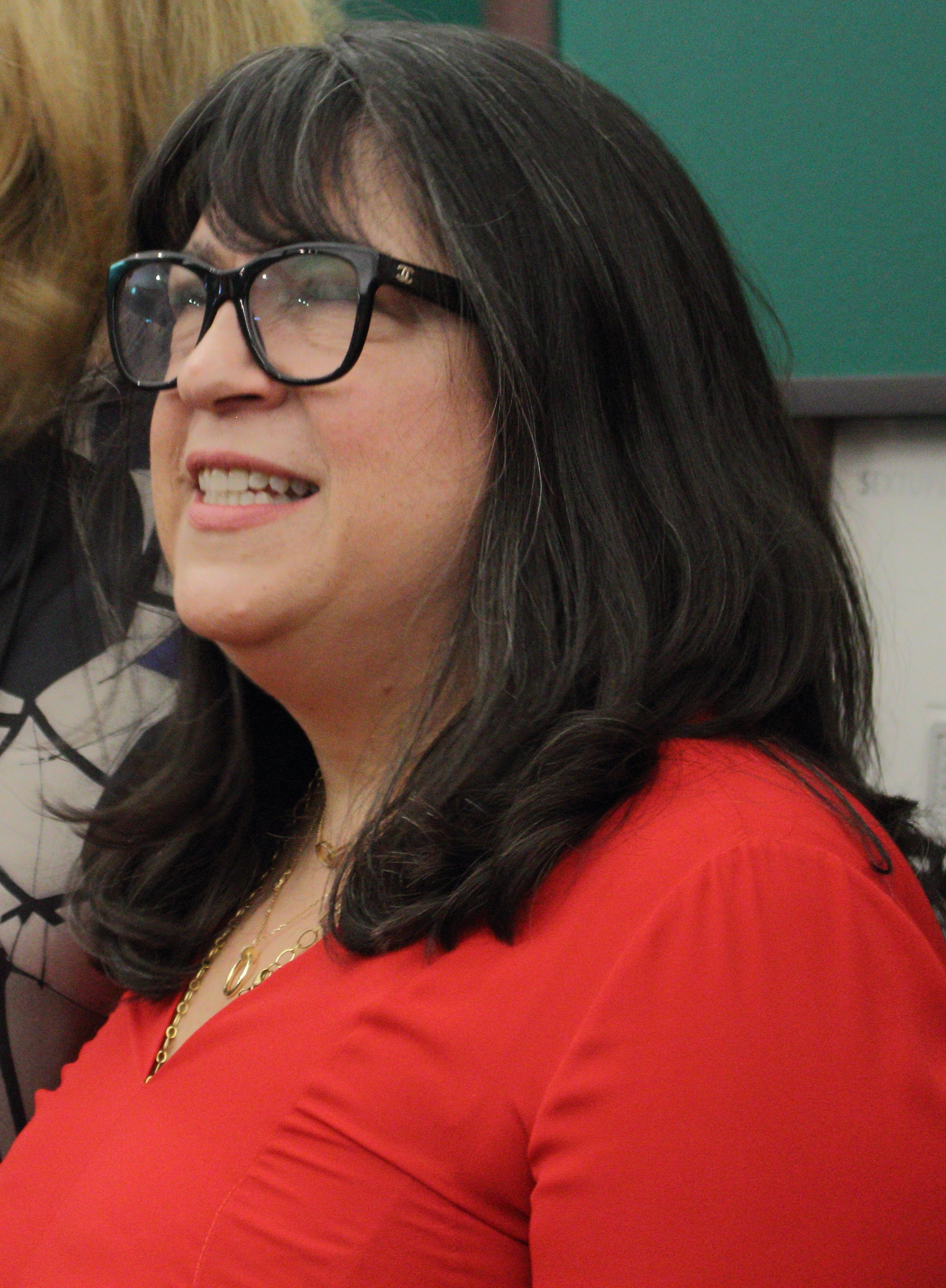
E. L. James, Worst Picture co-winner

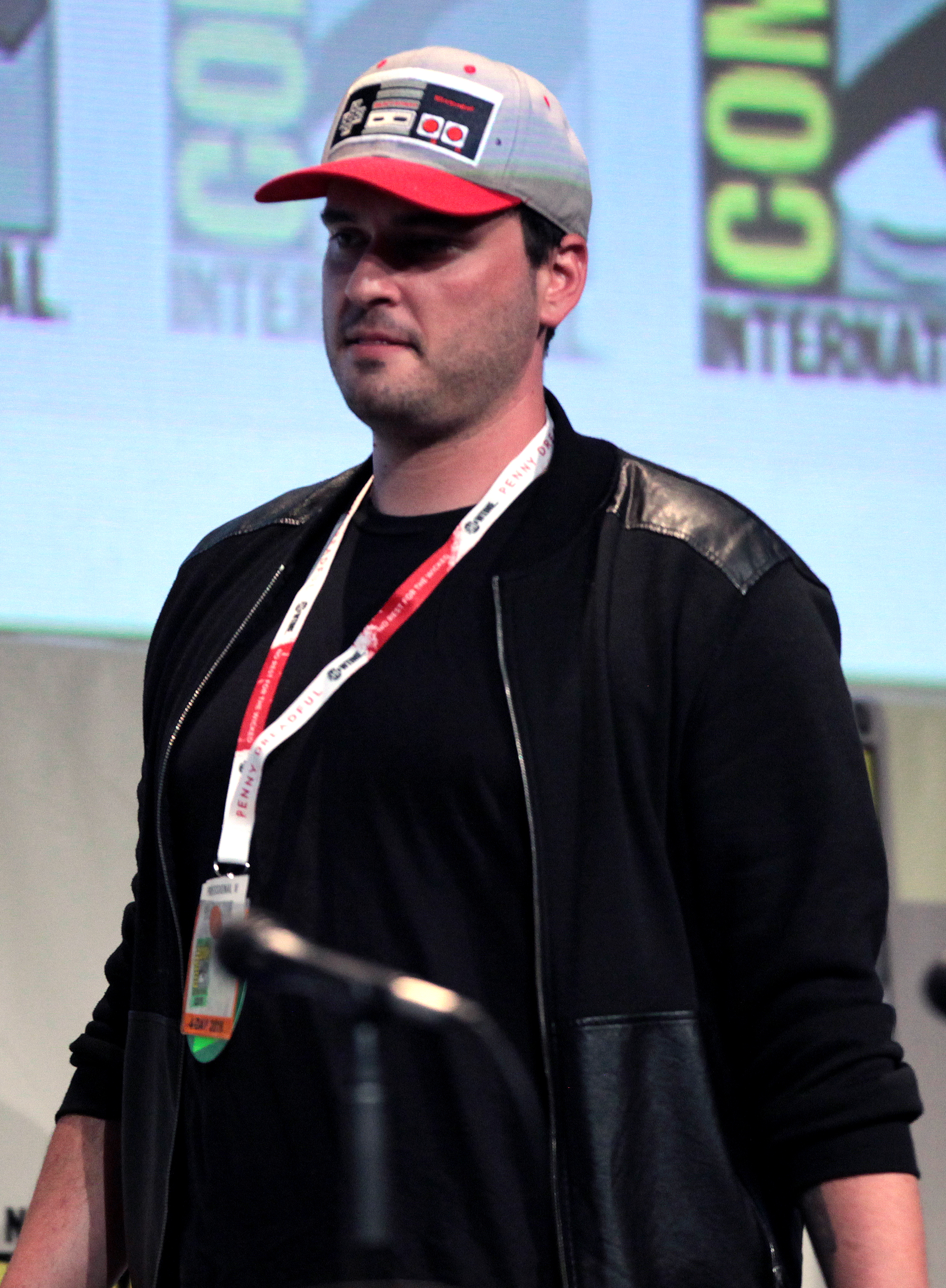
Josh Trank, Worst Director winner

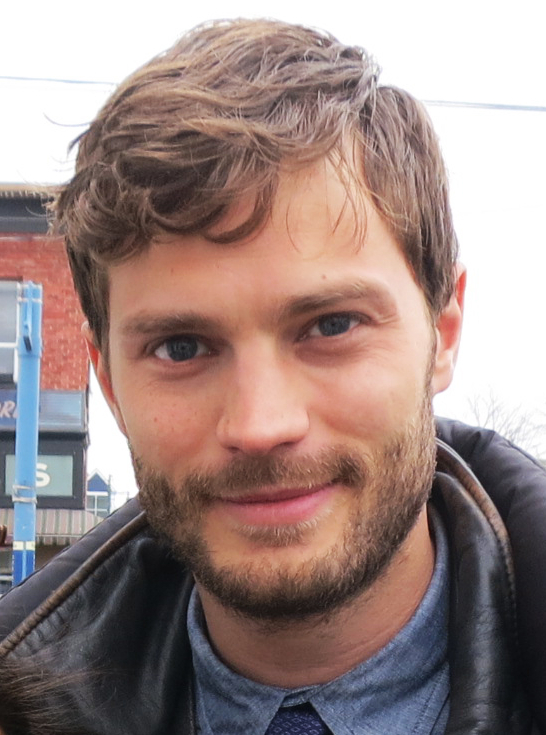
Jamie Dornan, Worst Actor winner and Worst Screen Combo co-winner

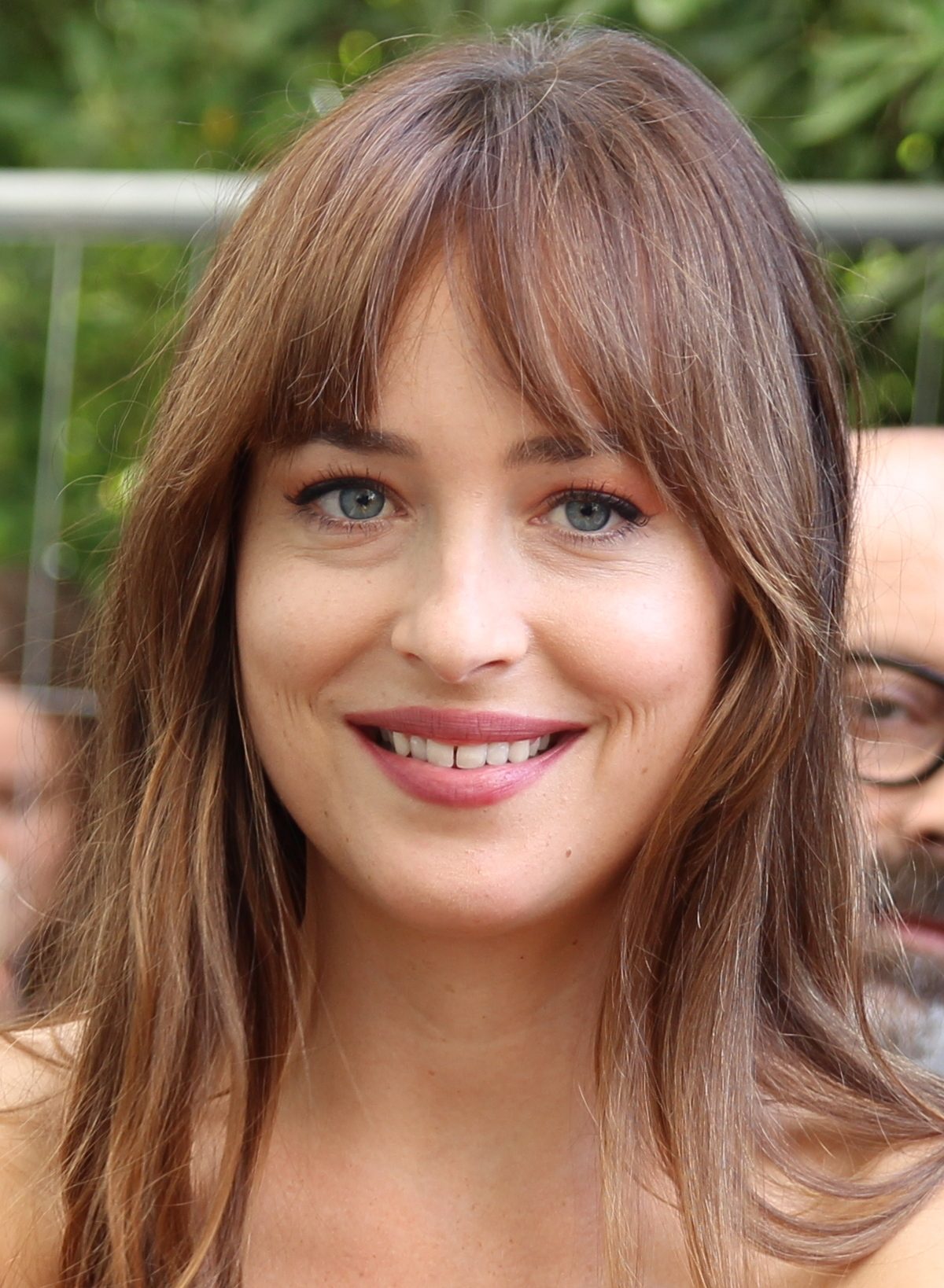
Dakota Johnson, Worst Actress winner and Worst Screen Combo co-winner

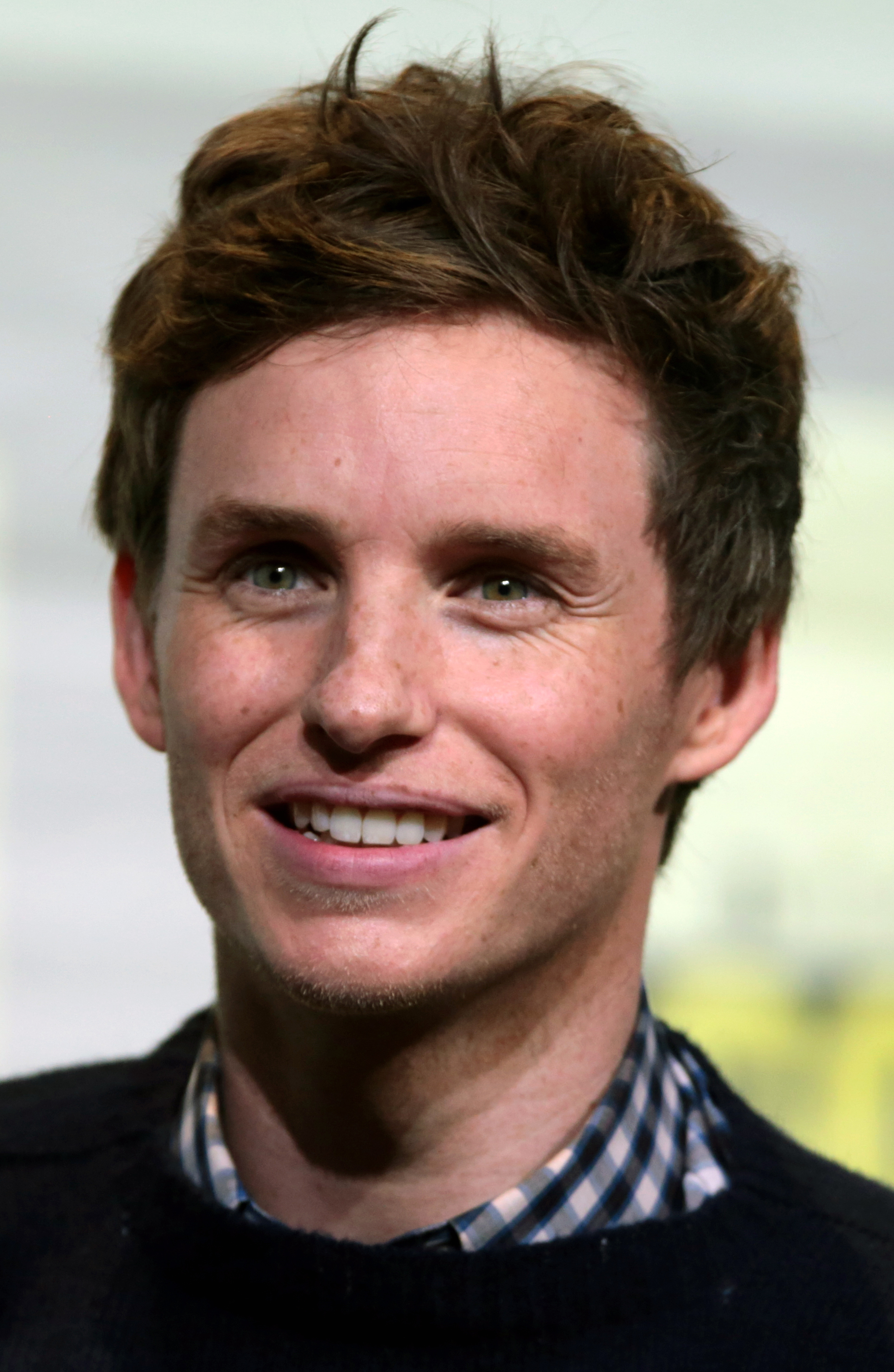
Eddie Redmayne, Worst Supporting Actor winner

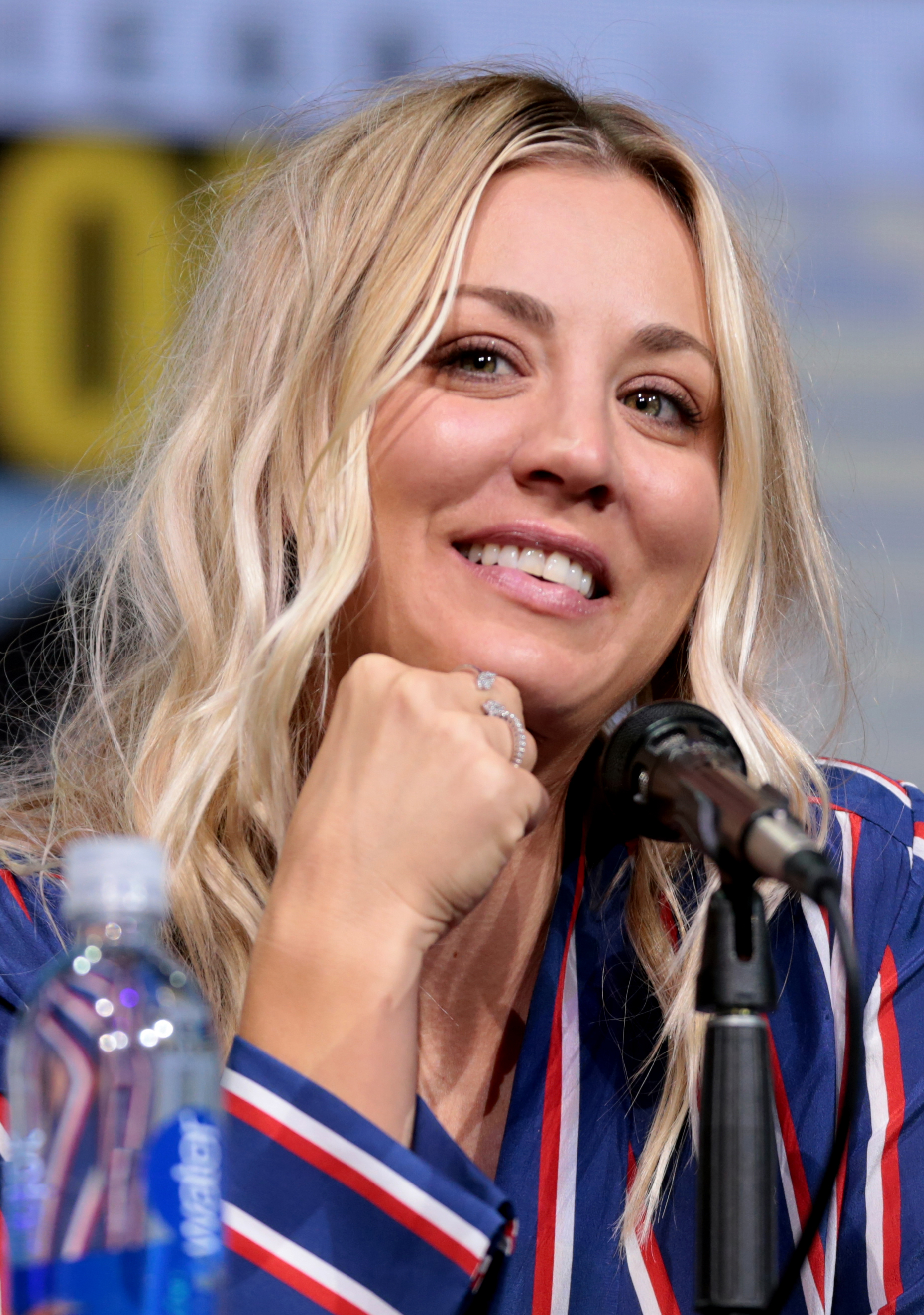
Kaley Cuoco, Worst Supporting Actress winner

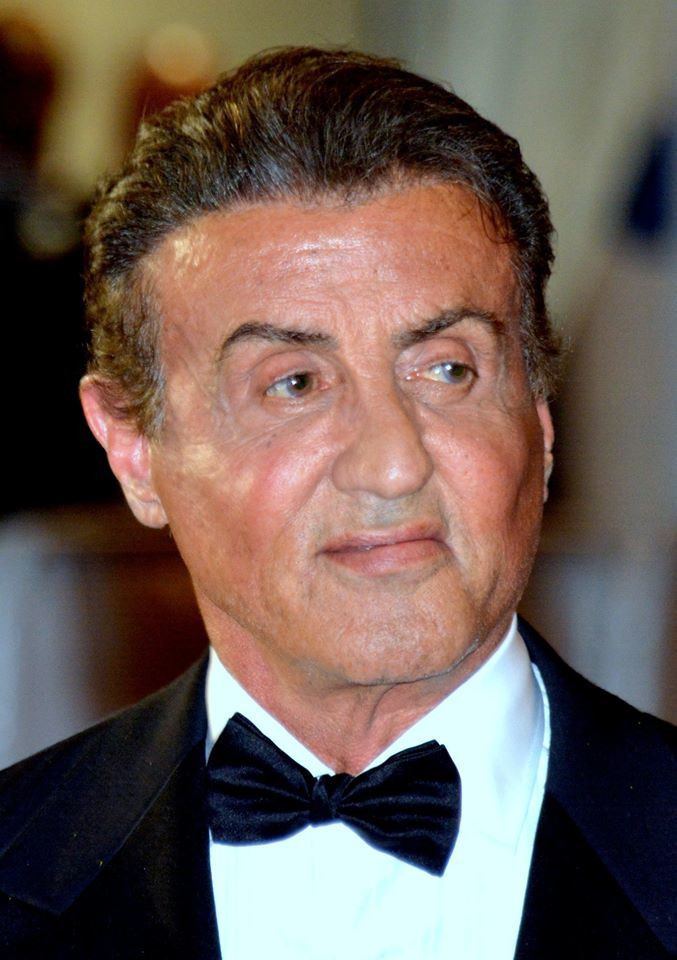
Sylvester Stallone, Razzie Redeemer Award winner

Worst Picture: Fantastic Four (20th Century Fox) – Simon Kinberg, Matthew Vaughn, Hutch Parker, Robert Kulzer, Gregory Goodman; Fifty Shades of Grey (Universal/Focus Features) – Michael De Luca, Dana Brunetti, E. L. James; Jupiter Ascending (Warner Bros.) – Grant Hill, The Wachowskis; Paul Blart: Mall Cop 2 (Columbia) – Todd Garner, Kevin James, Adam Sandler; Pixels (Columbia) – Adam Sandler, Chris Columbus, Mark Radcliffe, Allen Covert	Worst Director: Josh Trank – Fantastic Four; Andy Fickman – Paul Blart: Mall Cop 2; Tom Six – The Human Centipede 3 (Final Sequence); Sam Taylor-Johnson – Fifty Shades of Grey; The Wachowskis – Jupiter Ascending
Worst Actor: Jamie Dornan – Fifty Shades of Grey as Christian Grey; Johnny Depp – Mortdecai as Charlie Mortdecai; Kevin James – Paul Blart: Mall Cop 2 as Paul Blart; Adam Sandler – The Cobbler and Pixels as Max Simkin and Sam Brenner (respectively); Channing Tatum – Jupiter Ascending as Caine Wise	Worst Actress: Dakota Johnson – Fifty Shades of Grey as Anastasia Steele; Katherine Heigl – Home Sweet Hell as Mona Champagne; Mila Kunis – Jupiter Ascending as Jupiter Jones; Jennifer Lopez – The Boy Next Door as Claire Peterson; Gwyneth Paltrow – Mortdecai as Johanna Mortdecai
Worst Supporting Actor: Eddie Redmayne – Jupiter Ascending as Balem Abrasax; Chevy Chase – Hot Tub Time Machine 2 and Vacation as Hot Tub Repairman and Clark Griswold (respectively); Josh Gad – Pixels and The Wedding Ringer as Ludlow Lamonsoff and Doug Harris (respectively); Kevin James – Pixels as President William Cooper; Jason Lee – Alvin and the Chipmunks: The Road Chip as David "Dave" Seville	Worst Supporting Actress: Kaley Cuoco – Alvin and the Chipmunks: The Road Chip (voice only) and The Wedding Ringer as Eleanor and Gretchen Palmer, respectively; Rooney Mara – Pan as Tiger Lily; Michelle Monaghan – Pixels as Lieutenant Colonel Violet van Patten; Julianne Moore – Seventh Son as Mother Malkin; Amanda Seyfried – Love the Coopers and Pan as Ruby and Mary (respectively)
Worst Screen Combo: Jamie Dornan and Dakota Johnson – Fifty Shades of Grey; All four "Fantastics" (Miles Teller, Michael B. Jordan, Kate Mara, & Jamie Bell) – Fantastic Four; Johnny Depp and his glued-on moustache – Mortdecai; Kevin James and either his Segway or his glued-on moustache – Paul Blart: Mall Cop 2; Adam Sandler and any pair of shoes – The Cobbler	Worst Remake, Rip-off or Sequel: Fantastic Four (20th Century Fox) – Simon Kinberg, Matthew Vaughn, Hutch Parker, Robert Kulzer, Gregory Goodman; Alvin and the Chipmunks: The Road Chip (20th Century Fox) – Janice Karman, Ross Bagdasarian; Hot Tub Time Machine 2 (Paramount/Metro-Goldwyn-Mayer) – Andrew Panay; The Human Centipede 3 (Final Sequence) (IFC Midnight) – Tom Six, Ilona Six; Paul Blart: Mall Cop 2 (Columbia) – Todd Garner, Kevin James, Adam Sandler
Worst Screenplay: Fifty Shades of Grey – Kelly Marcel, from the novel by E. L. James; Fantastic Four – Jeremy Slater, Simon Kinberg and Josh Trank from the Marvel Comics characters by Stan Lee and Jack Kirby; Jupiter Ascending – The Wachowskis; Paul Blart: Mall Cop 2 – Nick Bakay and Kevin James; Pixels – Tim Herlihy and Timothy Dowling, story: Herlihy, from the short film by Patrick Jean	Razzie Redeemer Award: Sylvester Stallone – From all-time Razzie champ to 2015 award contender for Creed; Elizabeth Banks – From Razzie “winning” director for Movie 43 to directing the 2015 hit film Pitch Perfect 2; M. Night Shyamalan – From Perennial Razzie nominee and “winner” to directing the 2015 horror hit The Visit; Will Smith – For following up Razzie “wins” for After Earth to starring in Concussion
The Barry L. Bumstead Award: United Passions (Screen Media Films)

== Films with multiple nominations ==
The following twelve films received multiple nominations:

Nominations	Film
6	Fifty Shades of Grey
6	Jupiter Ascending
6	Paul Blart: Mall Cop 2
6	Pixels
5	Fantastic Four
3	Alvin and the Chipmunks: The Road Chip
3	Mortdecai
2	The Cobbler
2	Hot Tub Time Machine 2
2	The Human Centipede 3 (Final Sequence)
2	Pan
2	The Wedding Ringer

== Films with multiple wins ==
The following two films received multiple awards:

Wins	Film
5	Fifty Shades of Grey
3	Fantastic Four

== Box office performance of nominated films ==
Winner (in bold)

Film	Budget	Box office	Net	Rotten Tomatoes	Metacritic	Refs.
**Fifty Shades of Grey**	$40,000,000	$571,006,128	$531,006,128	25% (4.1/10)	46/100	
Pixels	$88,000,000	$244,874,809	$156,874,809	17% (3.9/10)	27/100	
**Alvin and the Chipmunks: The Road Chip**	$90,000,000	$234,798,636	$144,798,636	15% (3.42/10)	33/100	
Paul Blart: Mall Cop 2	$30–38 million	$107,588,225	$77,588,225	5% (2.6/10)	13/100	
Vacation	$31,000,000	$104,884,188	$73,884,188	27% (4.1/10)	34/100	
**The Wedding Ringer**	$23,000,000	$79,799,880	$56,799,880	28% (4.4/10)	35/100	
The Boy Next Door	$4,000,000	$52,425,855	$48,425,855	10% (3.3/10)	30/100	
**Fantastic Four**	$120,000,000	$167,977,596	$47,977,596	9% (3.4/10)	27/100	
Love the Coopers	$17,000,000	$42,426,912	$25,246,912	19% (3.9/10)	31/100	
Seventh Son	$95,000,000	$114,178,613	$19,178,613	13% (3.8/10)	30/100	
**Jupiter Ascending**	$176,000,000	$183,987,723	$7,987,723	26% (4.3/10)	40/100	
Hot Tub Time Machine 2	$14,000,000	$13,081,651	−$918,349	13% (3.8/10)	29/100	
The Cobbler	$10,000,000	$852,464	−$9,147,536	10% (3.1/10)	23/100	
Mortdecai	$60,000,000	$47,275,695	−$13,275,695	13% (3.4/10)	27/100	
Pan	$150,000,000	$128,388,320	−$21,388,320	27% (4.6/10)	36/100	
Home Sweet Hell	—N/a	—N/a	—N/a	5% (3.2/10)	22/100	
The Human Centipede 3 (Final Sequence)	—N/a	$16,184	—N/a	19% (2.2/10)	5/100	

== See also ==
- 22nd Screen Actors Guild Awards
- 88th Academy Awards
- 58th Grammy Awards
- 68th Primetime Emmy Awards
- 69th British Academy Film Awards
- 70th Tony Awards
- 73rd Golden Globe Awards
- List of submissions to the 88th Academy Awards for Best Foreign Language Film
