= Nipples & Palm Trees =

2012 film by Dylan Reynolds

- Film poster
- Directed by: Dylan Reynolds
- Written by: Matthew James
- Produced by: Matthew James; Dylan Reynolds; Vanessa Rose Parker
- Starring: Matthew James; Sadie Katz; Akihiro Kitamura; Vanessa Rose Parker
- Cinematography: Matt Gulley
- Edited by: Dylan Reynolds
- Production company: Jackson County Films
- Distributed by: Cinema Epoch
- Release date: July 13, 2012
- Running time: 89 minutes
- Country: United States
- Language: English

Nipples & Palm Trees is a 2012 American sex comedy film directed by Dylan Reynolds, written by Matthew James, and starring James, Sadie Katz, Akihiro Kitamura, and Vanessa Rose Parker.

== Plot summary ==
After having trouble with his girlfriend, a painter named Jackson searches Los Angeles to find love, though he mostly finds casual sex.

== Cast ==
- Matthew James as Jackson
- Sadie Katz as Harmony
- Akihiro Kitamura as Phil
- Vanessa Rose Parker as Liz
- Cary Thompson as Cary
- Will Morales as Al
- Jackie Kamm as C. C.

== Release ==
Nipples & Palm Trees was released theatrically July 13, 2012, and on DVD November 6, 2012. Hulu picked it up in October 2014.

== Reception ==
Robert Koehler of Variety wrote that the film is too incompetent to be funny. Gary Goldstein of the Los Angeles Times described it as "a dreary, dirty-talking sex comedy from the you've-got-to-be-kidding-me school of filmmaking". Michael Nordine of LA Weekly wrote, "Though Nipples and Palm Trees isn't without its eventual charms, the film is too content, for too long, to dwell on unfunny sleaze and thinly-sketched characters." HorrorCultFilms rated it 8/10 stars and called it "quite possibly the biggest surprise of the year".
