= Dani Thompson =

British actress and glamour model

- Born: 22 August 1983 (age 43); Penrith, New South Wales, Australia
- Occupations: Actress; model; television presenter
- Modeling information
- Height: 5 ft 2 in (1.57 m)
- Hair color: Dark Brown
- Eye color: Blue
- Website: Official modelling website

Danielle Thompson (born 22 August 1983) is a British actress, glamour model and TV presenter who rose to fame after making regular appearances in the Daily Sport and Sunday Sport newspapers, later becoming a prominent figure in UK horror industry.

In addition to continuing her work in horror films and as a glamour model, Dani hosts a weekly horror podcast called The Scream Princess.

== Early life ==
Thompson was born in Australia (in Penrith, New South Wales, on the fringe of Sydney). At the age of 2, her family relocated to Norwich, England.

== Career ==
Thompson started her professional modelling career featuring in the Daily Sport and Sunday Sport. She later appeared in British lads' magazines such as Nuts, Zoo Weekly, Loaded, Maxim and FHM; as well as gossip magazines New and Heat.

Deciding to pursue a career in acting, Thompson attended The International School Of Screen Acting, obtaining a Post Grad Diploma in Screen Acting in 2010. She has appeared in several feature films, including as a scream queen in British indie horror films.

During 2012, Thompson completed writing her first screenplay, originally titled Call Me, drawing partly on her experience as a model. Now renamed Serial Kaller, the film was shot in 2013. That year also saw Thompson film Axe to Grind, Cute Little Buggers, and Rock Band Vs Vampires.

At the beginning of 2014, Christmas Slay was filmed in Bulgaria.

== Filmography ==
- The Fixer (2009 - TV series) (Played Keeley)
- Just For The Record (2009) (Played Rapture)
- Brighton Rock (2010) (Played a ‘60s model)
- Riot (2010) (Played Kerry)
- How to Stop Being a Loser (2010) (Played Bambi)
- Monitor (2011) (Played Nurse A Price)
- Three's a Shroud (2012)
- Deadly Spectrum (2011) (Mary Rouge)
- Please Hold (2011 - Video short) (Bexi)
- No Strings 2 (2011 - not yet released) (Plays Mistress Pain)
- Forest of the Damned 2 (2011) (Angel)
- O31:Don't Fear the Reaper (2012)
- Big Pink (2012) (Sapphire)
- G.B.H. (2012) (Abi)
- The Fall of the Essex Boys (2013) (Casey)
- Zombie Women of Satan 2 (2013) (Zara)
- Convention of the Dead (2013) (Slave girl zombie)
- Axe to Grind (2013) (Nikki)
- Serial Kaller (2014) (Tanya)
- Christmas Slay (2014) (Beccy)
- Pumpkins (2018) (Pam)
- Harvest of the Dead Halloween Night (2020) (Sally Burns)
- Saturnalia: Cavegirl from outer space (2022) (Saturnalia)
- The Pocket Film of Superstitions (2023) (Ethelina/ Sara)
- Video Shop Tales of Terror (2023) (Played various characters across several segments)
- Punch (2023) (Babs)
- Christmas Party (2023) (Stacy)
- Nightmare on 34th Street (2023) (Carly)
- Mosaic (2024) (Paula Valentine)
- Blood Demons (2024) (Mylee)
- Burnt Flowers (2024) (Cassandra Young)
- Dragon (2024) (Valentina)
- One Night Rental (2024) (Mrs. Philby)
- Mannequin (2024) (Una Roper)
- Good Neighbours (2024) (Mary)
- Big Cats (2024) (Shelly Buckston)
- Who Do YOu Trust? (2024) (Carly)
- Video Shop Tales of Terror II: Lust and Revenge (2025) (Miss Dani Teeze)
