= Akihiro Kitamura =

Japanese actor (born 1979)

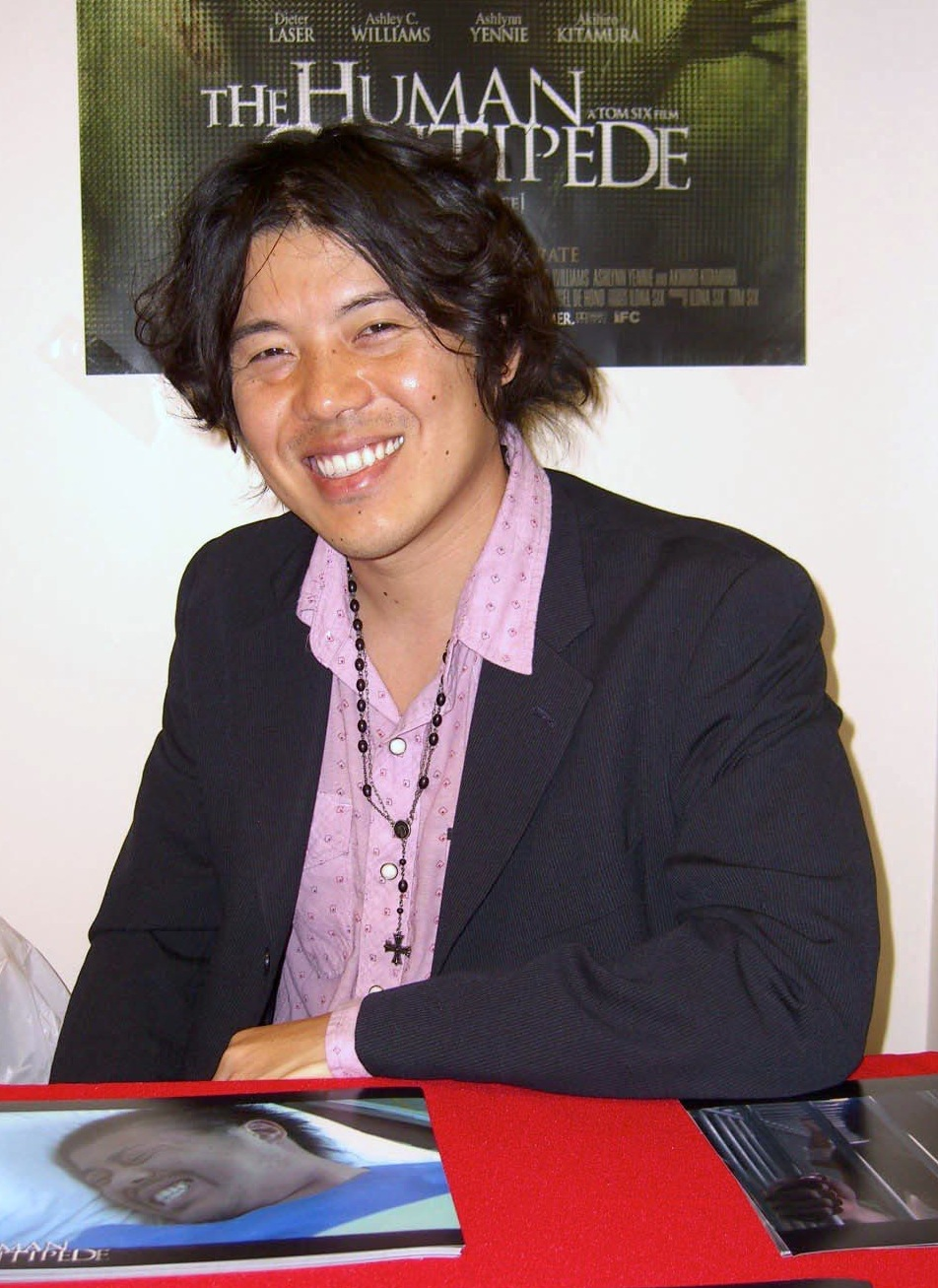
- Kitamura in 2010
- Born: March 26, 1979 (age 47); Kōchi, Japan
- Occupations: Actor, Director
- Years active: 2004–present
- Spouse: Miki Kawawa (m. 2016)

Akihiro Kitamura (北村 昭博, Kitamura Akihiro; born March 26, 1979) is a Japanese actor and director, who appeared in The Human Centipede (First Sequence) and Cobra Kai as Young Sato.

== Early life ==
After moving to the United States at the age of 18, Kitamura studied acting at the Beverly Hills Playhouse for five years. As a filmmaker he studied at the North Carolina School of the Arts (1997–1999) and at Los Angeles City College (2001–2004).

== Career ==
Kitamura's first two feature films, Porno and I'll Be There With You were both written and directed by him. He also starred in both of the films, playing the main characters.

In 2008, Kitamura appeared in a number of television roles, including VH1's New York Goes to Hollywood and MTV's From Gs to Gents. He also appeared in NBC's Heroes as Tadashi, a Japanese businessman who tries to commit suicide. The role's dialogue was done in Japanese to keep with the character.

In 2009, Kitamura starred in the controversial IFC Films horror film The Human Centipede (First Sequence).

== Filmography ==
=== Film ===
Film
Year	Film	Role	Notes
2004	Porno	Aki	Film debut
2006	I'll Be There with You	Aki	Main role
2007	Blinded by Beauty	Director	(short)
2009	The Human Centipede (First Sequence)	Katsuro	Main role
2011	Nipples & Palm Trees	Phil	
2012	SR Saitama no rappâ - Rôdosaido no toubousha	MC Rindou	
2013	It's a Beautiful Day	Masanori	
2013	Why Don't You Play in Hell?	Hitman	
2014	Operation Barn Owl	Kevin	(short)
2014	Tokyo Tribe	Mukade	
2015	The Human Centipede 3 (Final Sequence)	Inmate 333	
2016	Karate kill	Sexy Japanese Man	
2017	Shinjuku Swan II	Moriken	
2018	The Silk Road	Ryusuke	

=== Television ===
Television
Year	Series	Role	Notes
2007	Canoga Park	Aki	The Fashion Show/Haute Cooter
2008	From G's to Gents	Businessman	Episode 1.7
2008	New York Goes to Hollywood	Japanese director	2 episodes
2008	Seikatsu! Hop, Step, Mitsuwa	Director	19 episodes
2009	Heroes	Tadashi	Chapter Three 'Acceptance'
2010	Cinetsu!	Himself	2 episodes
2013	Loiter Squad	Japanese commercial director	1 episode
2013	Onna Nobunaga	Kazumasu Takigawa	2 episodes
2017	Tokyo Vampire Hotel	Gen	5 episodes
2022	Cobra Kai	Young Sato	1 episode
