= Bree Olson =

American former pornographic film actress (born 1986)

- Olson in 2012
- Born: Rachel Oberlin; October 7, 1986 (age 40); Houston, Texas, U.S.
- Occupations: Pornographic film actress; model; social media personality
- Years active: 2006-present
- Spouse: Kayla Banter (2019-2021; divorced)

Rachel Oberlin (born October 7, 1986), known professionally as Bree Olson, is an American actress, model, and former pornographic film actress. She performed in over 170 adult films from 2006 to 2011. Since retiring from pornography, she has been critical of the discrimination and social stigma directed at adult film performers.

== Early life ==
Olson was born in Houston, Texas. She says she moved with her mother to Fort Wayne, Indiana, when she was two years old. Her mother and stepfather later bought a house in nearby Woodburn, Indiana. Her first summer job was detasseling corn plants.

== Career ==
=== Adult films ===
Olson entered the pornographic film industry in November 2006 and worked for a variety of companies such as Digital Playground, Elegant Angel, and Red Light District Video. She was a contract performer with Adam & Eve from 2007 to 2010. She says she chose the stage name Bree Olson because it sounded "wholesome" and also because she liked the actresses the Olsen twins.

Olson was named Penthouse Pet of the Month for March 2008. In 2010, she was named by Maxim as one of the 12 top female porn stars. She appeared on the covers of both Penthouse and Playboy in 2011. She retired from shooting pornography in 2011, having appeared in more than 170 adult films. The Daily Beast has called her "one of the most sought-after actresses in the adult film industry".

In a 2016 interview for the YouTube video series Real Women, Real Stories, she highlighted the social stigma she felt she was subjected to as a former pornographic film actress, saying that people treated her as they would a "pedophile". Saying there was nothing wrong with women wanting to embrace their sexuality, she nonetheless advised young women to stay away from the pornography business, citing discrimination she has faced from employers using morality clauses to avoid hiring adult film performers. In an essay for The Daily Dot, she wrote, "Porn didn't hurt me. The way society treats me for having done it does". She also criticized the lack of financial security performers face, saying that porn was "the only entertainment industry that doesn't offer talent royalties after they are gone". According to CNN, Olson worked "reluctantly" as a webcam model after leaving the porn industry, mainly due to a lack of other career options.

=== Mainstream TV and cinema ===
Olson at the Exxxotica in Miami, 2009

In 2007, Olson appeared on the E! Network reality show Keeping Up with the Kardashians, in which she played a nanny to daughters Kendall and Kylie Jenner who was fired for wearing bikinis at her job. Olson later told Cosmopolitan that although the show portrayed matriarch Kris Jenner as having hired her from a "reputable agency", she had actually been booked by her agent, relating that during casting, the producers "wanted a super-sexy vixen. Instead they got a cute little girl with blonde hair, like the girl next door. I just looked too wholesome, even in a bikini. I showed up with a baby blue and pink gingham two-piece. I mean...And so they had to spin it, I think, because they wanted me to be super trashy. I think that they thought because of my background that that's just something that comes naturally, but it doesn't to me." Olson stated that she was cast in order to engage in antics such as rummaging through Kris' belongings and sunbathing by the pool while topless, in order to provoke a reaction from family members such as Caitlyn Jenner, who was initially uncomfortable with her presence, but became more amenable when the two of them got to know one another. After the producers left the house, Olson was left to babysit the children in earnest, spending time with them and getting to know them.

Olson subsequently appeared in the independent comedy film Purgatory Comics (2009), co-starred in the horror film The Human Centipede 3 (Final Sequence) (2015), and appeared in Penn Jillette and Adam Rifkin's Director's Cut (2016). She played Divatox in the short web film Power/Rangers. She has appeared in a series of videos for Will Ferrell and Adam McKay's website Funny or Die.

== Personal life ==
Olson was in a relationship with actor Charlie Sheen for six months as his live-in girlfriend alongside model for the marijuana magazine Cali Chronic X, Natalie Kenly. Sheen nicknamed the two women his "goddesses". Their relationship ended in April 2011. In 2011 when Sheen came out as HIV-positive, Olson claimed he showed symptoms of HIV during their relationship to which she took an HIV test that came back as HIV-negative.

Olson is vegan and a lesbian.

== Filmography ==
=== Film ===
Year	Title	Role	Notes
2009	Purgatory Comics	Self	Feature film debut
2013	Not Another Celebrity Movie	Porn Star 1	
2015	Power/Rangers	Divatox	Short film
2015	The Human Centipede 3 (Final Sequence)	Daisy	
2016	Director's Cut	Sexy Nurse	Cameo
2018	Three Bullets to Redemption	Bree	

=== Television ===
Year	Title	Role	Notes
2007	Keeping Up with the Kardashians	Self	guest star
2009	Tosh.0	Self	Cameo
2011	ABC News	Self	Interview
2013-2016	Funny or Die	Self	Various episodes
2015	Bree Does Comedy	Self	Host; 6 episodes
2016	Fox News	Self	interview

== Awards ==
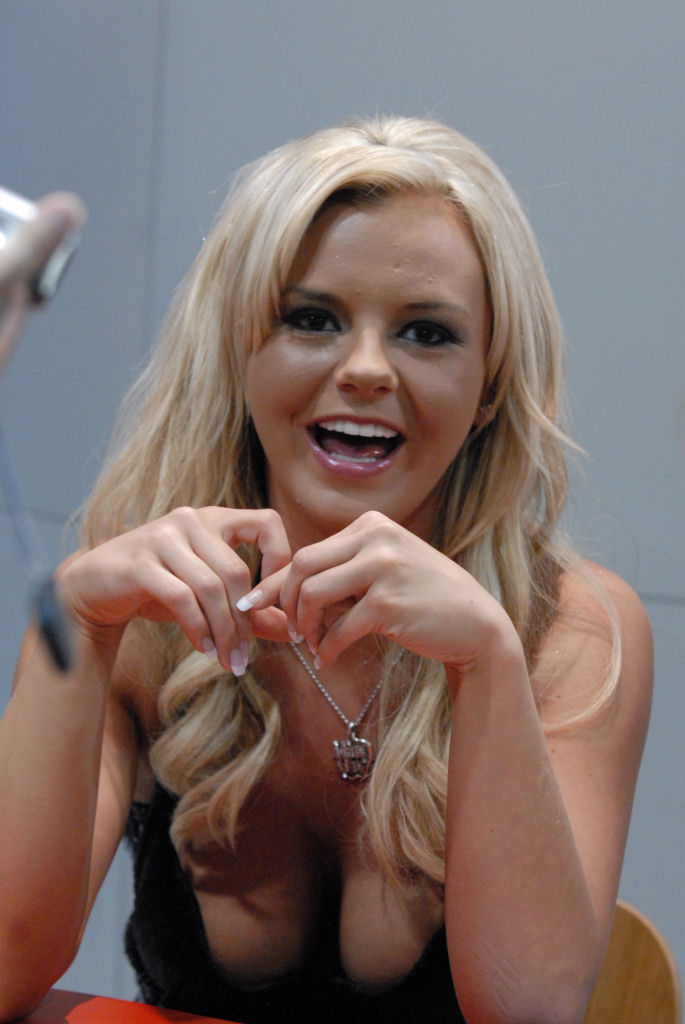
Olson at the Adult Entertainment Expo, 2010

- 2007 NightMoves Award – Best New Starlet (Editor's Choice)
- 2007 Adultcon Top 20 Adult Actresses
- 2008 AVN Award – Best New Starlet
- 2008 AVN Award – Best Anal Sex Scene (Video) – Big Wet Asses 10 (with Brandon Iron)
- 2008 XBIZ Award – New Starlet of the Year
- 2008 Adam Film World Guide Award – Starlet of the Year
- 2008 XRCO Award – New Starlet
- 2008 XRCO Award – Cream Dream
- 2008 F.A.M.E. Award – Favorite Female Rookie
- 2008 NightMoves Award – Best Female Performer (Fan's Choice)
- 2008 NightMoves Award – Best Girl/Girl Release – Bree & Kayden (Fan's Choice)
- 2009 AVN Award – Best New Web Starlet – BreeOlson.com
- 2009 Twistys Treat of the Year
- 2009 NightMoves Award – Best Female Performer (Fan's Choice)
- 2010 AEBN VOD Award – Performer of the Year
- 2010 AVN Award – Best All-Girl Three-Way Sex Scene – The 8th Day (with Poppy Morgan & Tori Black)
- 2010 Miss FreeOnes
- 2010 NightMoves Award – Best All Girl Release (Fan's Choice) – Bree & Teagan
- 2011 NightMoves Award – Best Social Media Star (Editor's Choice)
- 2012 Fame Registry Award – Social Network Sensation
- 2012 XRCO Award – Mainstream Adult Media Favorite
