= Tom Six =

Dutch filmmaker (born 1973)

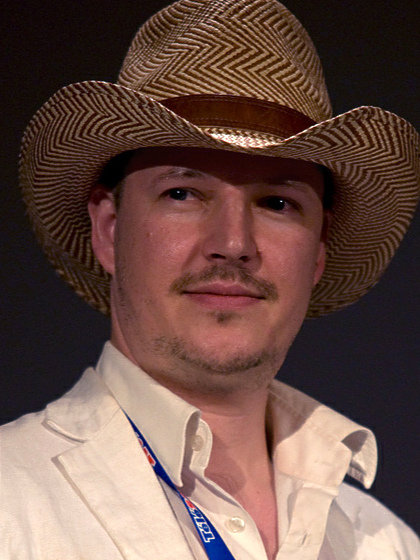
- Six in February 2011
- Born: 29 August 1973 (age 53); Alkmaar, Netherlands
- Occupations: Filmmaker; director; writer; actor; producer; editor
- Years active: 2004–present
- Website: sixentertainmentcompany.com

Tom Six (born 29 August 1973) is a Dutch filmmaker, screenwriter, film editor, and actor. He is best known for his trilogy of body horror films; The Human Centipede (First Sequence) (2009), The Human Centipede 2 (Full Sequence) (2011) and The Human Centipede 3 (Final Sequence) (2015). Six was an original director of Dutch reality TV series Big Brother, which has since become an international franchise.

== Early life ==
Tom Six was born in Alkmaar, North Holland, in the Netherlands, on 29 August 1973.

== Career ==
Six started a film production company with his sister Ilona called Six Entertainment, where he wrote and directed such films as Gay in Amsterdam, Honeyz and I Love Dries (later retitled What the F**k?!), about the aspiring Dutch singer Dries Roelvink.

Six had success with the film The Human Centipede. Although it met with mixed reviews and reactions, The Human Centipede garnered widespread attention. The first film's success gave Six the flexibility he needed to work on a sequel, The Human Centipede 2 (Full Sequence), eventually leading to a trilogy. He made the first film to get viewers comfortable with the idea of the Human Centipede. Both the controversial content of the first film and the second's brutal depictions of sexual violence have generated controversy. In the United Kingdom, the BBFC declined to issue an 18 certificate for The Human Centipede 2 (Full Sequence), highlighting the antagonist's "total degradation, humiliation, mutilation, torture, and murder of his naked victims". Six then submitted a new cut with two minutes and 37 seconds removed and received the 18 certificate. Six responded with mixed feelings. On the one hand, he was devastated that he had to cut his film, and on the other, the decision of the BBFC gained much press and notoriety. He has said, "In the UK, censors cut many minutes from The Human Centipede 2 by law. It feels like I made a comedy and they cut out all the good jokes. It’s appalling. Nobody is forced to see a movie."

The final film in the Human Centipede series, The Human Centipede 3 (Final Sequence), was released on 22 May 2015. Tom Six's idea was that each of the three sequences of The Human Centipede can stand on their own as a self-contained film, or they can be connected into a single 4.5-hour-long movie. The Human Centipede 2 begins where the original ends, while The Human Centipede 3 begins where The Human Centipede 2 ends; therefore, the three films together make a "movie centipede" titled The Human Centipede (Complete Sequence).

For several years, Six has been attempting to distribute the satirical psychological horror film The Onania Club, originally due in 2017, later delayed to 2019, and with no updated release date. He commented on the matter, saying that "great art takes time." According to Six Entertainment Company official site, the movie was finished in 2020. However, in 2021, Six admitted there have been issues getting it released after the distributor decided not to release it, which led to Six asking fans for support to get it released.

== Personal life and health ==
In 2026, Six publicly disclosed that he had been living with multiple sclerosis (diagnosed roughly 14 years earlier and kept private for a long time). He made the self-described final documentary The End of Tom Six (shot over a year while largely isolated in his Amsterdam home), produced with his long-time partner/girlfriend Maartje Willems, through their company Six Headquarters. Six talks about his unreleased film The Onania Club, living with multiple sclerosis and his views on the film industry, art and life itself. After distributors ignored or rejected the documentary as well, they released it independently on YouTube in mid-August 2026 on a pay-what-you-want basis (also available on DVD through their website www.theendoftomsix.com).

== Filmography ==
Year	Film	Functioned as				Notes
Year	Film	Director	Writer	Producer	Actor	Notes
2004	Gay in Amsterdam	Yes	Yes	Yes	No	
2007	Honeyz	Yes	Yes	Yes	No	
2008	I Love Dries (Note: Re-cut for English-speaking audiences as What the F**k?! [sic].)	Yes	Yes	Yes	No	
2009	The Human Centipede (First Sequence) (Note: Uncut versions of all three of the Human Centipede films were compiled into the official 2016 film titled The Human Centipede (Complete Sequence) - The Movie Centipede.)	Yes	Yes	Yes	No	
2011	The Human Centipede 2 (Full Sequence)	Yes	Yes	Yes	No	
2015	The Human Centipede 3 (Final Sequence)	Yes	Yes	Yes	Yes	Uncredited appearance
2020	The Onania Club	Yes	Yes	Yes	Yes	Unreleased film
2026	The End of Tom Six	Yes	Yes	Yes	Himself	Documentary film
