= Erotas season 2 =

Erotas
- Season 2
- No. of episodes: 230

Release
- Original network: ANT1
- Original release: September 17, 2006 – July 13, 2007

Season chronology
- ← Previous; Season 1 Next → Season 3

This article contains a summary of the second season of the Greek television soap opera Erotas.

== Background and criticism ==
This series picks up months after the fatal bombing at Martha's farewell party, at the end of Season 1. This season introduces many new characters, and has been criticised for have a cast too large, and therefore slow development of story lines. Despite this, ratings remained consistent with season 1, and the show continued to rate very highly, especially at the end of the season, when many of the new characters were either killed, or left the show. The show was also highly criticised for killing the very popular character Vera Douka, at which point the ratings fell by 15% for a short period of time.

== Cast ==
=== Starring ===
- Koralia Karanti - Myrto Anagnostou
- Gregoris Valtinos - Ektoras Anagnostou
- Noni Ioannidou - Vera Douka
- Vasia Panagopoulou - Aphrodite Aperyi
- Stefanos Kiriakidis - Stefanos Doukas
- Adamantia Kontogiorgi - Antigoni Douka
- Dimitris Liakopoulos - Pavlos Doukas
- Manos Papayiannis - Renos Doukas
- Maro Mavri - Nadia Douka
- Alexandros Parthenis - Angelos Papadatos
- Christos Vasilopoulos - Lefteris Argiyiou
- Yiannis Spaliaras - Alexandros Mavrakis
- Καterina Savrani - Anna
- Anna Tsoukala - Fedra

=== Also starring ===
- Manos Zaharakos- Konstantinos
- Patricia Peristeri- Christina Douka
- Katerina Mantziou- Tania Azaroglou
- Yiannis Aivazis - Manos
- Augoustinos Remondos- Stelios
- Vaso Laskaraki - Ariadni
- Georgia Mavrogiorgi- Thalia
- Othonos Metaksas- Philippos
- Stella Antipa- Eleftheria
- Deana Douvani - Eva Anagnostou
- Vyron Kolasis- Markos Anagnostou
- George Dambasis - Aris
- Vasilis Galeos - Andreas
- Katerina Panayaki- Eleni
- Thodoris Thanos- Dimitrakis
- Athina Zotou- Alexandra

=== Special guest star ===
- Kostas Mesaris - Yerasimos Papadatos

== Plot summary ==
=== Martha and Vasiliki ===
At the start of the second season months have passed since the tragic explosion at Martha's farewell party. Andreas, who sets a bomb in Martha's house makes a last minute leap into the house upon seeing young Eva's face. He dies instantly while everybody else in the house miraculously survives. We learn that Martha has moved away to Kriti. Her mother, Vasiliki, continues to run the bar that she bought from long-standing friend Dida, at the end of season one. Overwhelmed by all the losses of her family, Vasiliki departs from Mykonos, renting her house to two young employee's at "Antigones Resort" -Nadia and Philippos. She joins Martha in Kriti and disappears from the show altogether. However, Martha was recently seen in flashback sequences when Renos was reflecting on his failed relationships, after he and Fedra broke up. Writers have said she may return to the show sometime next season, but only in a guest role.

=== Vera and Antigoni ===
Vera is released from prison in the season première and seeks to foil her estranged husband, Stephanos Doukas, by pretending to have developed a life-threatening cancer leaving her about 6 months to live. She fabricates this story with the help of Antigone and Alexandros, who help her to deceive the entire family by paying a fraudulent doctor to lie about her diagnosis. When the doctor's office disappears the truth is uncovered and uncovers Vera's sadistic plot. She is ostracised by the entire family and commits suicide as a final demonstration. Antigoni, blames her parents Mirto and Stefanos for never accepting Vera into the family, driving her to commit suicide, and leaves Greece and the Doukas family permanently venturing off to London. Her new flame, Philipos, tracks her down in France, where they become united, and he too disappears from the show. However, Antigoni was reintroduced into the show at the end of the second season, having finally gotten over Vera's death and regretting abandoning her family due to her grief. However, it was later seen that the only reason that Antigoni returned was so that she could destroy Alexandros' relationship with newcomer Tania, succeeding temporarily, but the couple later reunited after Antigoni left the country, and Nadia convinced the couple to reunite. Antigoni will probably never return to the show, as her father, disgusted in his daughter's behaviour disinherits her and places the painting of her as a small child back on his wall after she left, because that is the only way that he wants to remember her, after everything that she has done, therefore finally bringing closure to this storyline.

=== Alexandros and Antigoni, and working his way back into the Doukas family ===
Alexandros is in hot pursuit of his estranged wife Antigoni. He no longer has the DVD controlling Stephanos and protecting Antigone from incarceration for the shooting down of an innocent lawyer (happened in Season 1). He does not make much progress, but eventually reports to Stephanos that he has made contact with Antigoni and settled his financial claims with her. For a temporary time, he acquires Antigoni's shares in the Doukas' family multimillion-dollar pharmaceutical company. He uses these shares as a way to make amends with Stephanos after willingly disobeying Stephanos' wishes to desert Antigoni. Alexandros proves his loyalty and gains Stephanos trust when he rescues Pavlo from criminals who have kidnapped both him and Christina in an effort to thwart Mirto's testimony at the trial convicting Aphroditi Apergi of the first degree murder of her late husband, Dr. Papadatos. Alexandros has now firmly re-established himself back into Stefanos' family and is dating Tania.

==== Mirto/Lefteri/Ektora/Aphrodite ====
Philipos' friend Nadia, has an interest in Mirto's husband Lefteri, and when Mirto and Lefteri break up after she continually refuses to have a child with him, Nadia and Lefteri have sex. However, Lefteri realises that he is still in love with his wife and tells her everything and they soon reunite. Later in the season, Lefteri and Mirto break up several times due to Mirto's very close platonic relationship with her ex-husband Ektora threatening Lefteri. Mirto is also kidnapped part-way through the season by Aphrodite's late-husbands associates so she doesn't reveal the evidence in court that she has to prove that Aphrodite didn't murder her late-husband. They also adopt a seven-year-old boy, Andreas, His birthmother Alexandra who is a drug addict meets Stelios the child's biological father and tells him that they have a son but Stelios wants proof of this so Alexandra kidnaps Andrea and has a DNA test performed on the child to prove paternity. Stelios also arranges for Alexandra to go into rehabilitation to repair her image as a parent then they to fight for custody of the child against adoptive parents Mirto and Lefteri. Ektora's new girlfriend Aphroditi also found the close relationship between Mirto and Ektora threatening, and after being framed for murder by her elderly husband (whom she had stood by despite the lack in physical attraction between them for many years, because she pitied him), making an alliance with her late-husband's son, Angelos, to hide her from Ektora soon after she is released from prison, she flees the country for London. She also defends abandoning Ektora by saying that she had to protect her child from the jailbirds demanding money from her, and also the fact that he said he wouldn't be with her if it wasn't for her being pregnant. Aphroditi is still heard frequently in phone calls, and Ektora has now discovered her rough whereabouts, with the help of Stefanos. Aphrodite recently gave birth in London, informing Angelos by phone. Angelos has fallen in love with Aphroditi and the two have started a romantic relationship. (see section below) Lefteri also beats Andreas' biological mother, Alexandra, after it is almost certain that she will be taking her son back, he also sleeps with an unidentified woman, which has forced Mirto to consider divorce again. He also begins drinking, and hits Mirto while heavily intoxicated after she tells him that she turned to Ektora for support because he is the only person that she can turn to in this difficult time. Mirto and Lefteri divorce. Ektora is currently single, and has become increasingly close to Mirto. This is being noticed by many people around the ex-couple.

=== Stefanos and Nadia ===
Stefanos and Nadia grow close in the second half of the season as both of them feel very lonely, they begin a relationship and soon after marry in secret from their friends and family. The fact that they were married was uncovered however when Stefanos and Nadia became entangled in a murder mystery involving Stefanos' sister. However, it turned out that long-time maid, Olga had committed the murder. Stefanos and Nadia however, continue to face problems in their marriage after Nadia begins work at Stefanos' chemical factory, much to the dismay of his son Renos, who has a romantic crush on her. Furthermore, Stefanos reintroduces drug trafficking within his business, and information about this has been caught on tape by Tania and Ari, who were trying to expose these dealings, however Tania regretted it and they stopped, much to Ari's dismay. Ari continued to work behind Tania's back with Angelo, Renos' former friend, who opened a pharmaceutical business with Renos' ex-girlfriend's partner, Constantinos, until Ari was murdered by Angelo for not agreeing with his plans. Stefanos and Nadia remain happily married, and share all their problems with each other, the problems caused with Antigoni's return caused them to come much closer.

=== Renos/Anna/Fedra love triangle ===
Renos embarks on a relationship with new character Anna at the beginning of the season, however he soon discovers that he is in love with her sister, Fedra. Both Fedra and Renos realise their love but can't be together as Fedra accidentally fell pregnant with Constantinos in a one-night stand, and they decide to do the right thing and marry, even after the baby is lost. Renos tries to stop Fedra on the day of her wedding but is unsuccessful. Renos breaks up with Anna unable to withstand the relationship with her any longer, soon after Renos and Fedra finally end up together, much to the dismay of Anna and Constantinos. Anna makes it her mission to get back at them by any means possible, and has Fedra raped in front of Renos in an attempt to dismantle their relationship. She succeeds, but Fedra soon discovers that her sister employed the rapists when she finds one of them in her house talking to her sister. Anna then flees town to go and live with her father, while Fedra leaves behind everything that has gone wrong in the past year to start a new life with none other than her ex-husband Konstantinos. New neighbours move in next to Renos, who are taping him, in an attempt to expose his father's drug ring within the family business. They are related to the person who took the blame when Renos was convicted due to his father's drug trafficking earlier this year. Renos took a long time to get over the relationship with Fedra, and now resides in Paris due to complications of Angelo's crimes (see below), but he is still credited and is expected to return to the show next season.

=== Pavlos/Christina/Ariadni/Manos love square ===
Pavlos and Christina's relationship becomes much more serious after he is diagnosed with a potentially fatal blood condition, the first time they don't make it to the altar and both decide to not turn up to their wedding. The second time, Christina goes to the wrong church on the day of the wedding, however they finally marry and soon after they marry, a male donor is found for Pavlos' condition and all is well. However, Christina quickly finds herself infatuated with the donor Manos and Pavlos with the donor's girlfriend Ariadni. Myrtle is aware of the affairs that have risen from these infatuations, and is deeply worried about both of the newly-weds. Christina has recently become best friends with the donor's now ex-girlfriend, Ariadni, after the couples engaged in a sort of story similar to a real life wife swap. The 4 people have now split up, with Manos going to Iraq to work on photography, as an attempt to get over his relationships with Ariadni and Christina and Christina and Ariadni avoiding Pavlos to try to get over their relationships with him. Pavlos is constantly seeking relationship advice from Hector and his brother, which provides some of the comic relief in this storyline.

=== Aphrodite and Angelo relationship and complications ===
Aphrodite returns to Athens with Angelo, and they begin a relationship. At the end of the season they are planning to move away from the country and get married. However, Angelo murdered one of the people that was monitoring Renos and tried to frame Renos for it, blackmailing him to get Renos' father to stop threatening Angelle's business. Renos fled the country and in an attempt to clear her son's name, Myrtle in collaboration with Stefanos are suspected of hatching a plan to kill Angelo. The reason for this suspicion is that Myrtle invited them to her Birthday cruise which was also for the opening of her new resort in Spetses as a result of finding out about Renos' problems, due to Angelo's crimes. Angelo and Aphrodite thought that they were invited to the cruise by sponsors of Myrtle's resort, however Angelo thought it was Myrtle that invited them and insisted that they didn't go after some thought. Unaware of Angelo's crimes, Aphrodite wants to go the cruise, to prove that she doesn't care what Myrtle and Hector think of her relationship with Angelo. Unable to tell Aphrodite that he killed Ari, Angelo agrees to go to the cruise since he promised that he would go with her. At this time, Aphrodite is still being threatened by Apostolia about the money that she owes her because Apostolia knows about the fake witnesses involved in Aphrodite's court case at the beginning of the season. The season ends with Aphrodite and Angelo boarding the cruise.
