= Erotas season 1 =

Erotas
- Season 1
- No. of episodes: 221

Release
- Original network: ANT1
- Original release: September 8, 2005 – June 24, 2006

Season chronology
- Next → Season 2

This article contains a summary of the first season of the Greek television soap opera Erotas.

== Background ==
The viewer is introduced to the upper class society of Athens. Their personal dilemmas outweigh their wealth. A heart surgeon and a business woman have a daughter, all seems wonderful in their life until the woman's ex-husband sets it as his objective to destroy her life.

== Cast ==
=== Starring ===
- Koralia Karanti - Myrto Anagnostou
- Gregoris Valtinos - Ektoras Anagnostou
- Noni Ioannidou - Vera Douka
- Georgia Apostolou - Martha Douka
- Stefanos Kiriakidis - Stefanos Doukas
- Katerina Didaskalou - Ioulia Anagnostou
- Adamantia Kontogiorgi - Antigoni Douka
- Dimitris Liakopoulos - Pavlos Doukas
- Manos Papayiannis - Renos Doukas
- Christos Vasilopoulos - Lefteris Argiriou
- Yiannis Spaliaras - Alexandros

=== Also Starring ===
- Elena Keramida - Eva Anagnostou
- Natasha Tsakarisianou - Basiliki
- Manos Zaharakos - Konstantinos
- Patricia Peristeri - Christina Douka
- Victor Kolasis - Markos Anagnostou

== Ratings ==
The series, opened to very strong ratings, ranking 4th within Greece, and 2nd in its timeslot, unable to beat the popular Vera Sto Dexi.

== Plot summary ==
=== Myrto / Ektora / Lefteri / Ioulia ===
Ein erfolgreicher Herzchirurg und unsere dynamische Geschäftsentwicklung Frau genießen die persönliche und familiäre Abschluss mit ihrer Tochter. Alles scheint in ihrem Leben wunderbar bis zu dem Augenblick, dass die Frau Ex-Mann setzt es als sein Ziel, ihr Leben zu zerstören. Myrto und Ektora und genießen das Leben, aber nicht für lange, als Ioulia es darauf anlegt ihre Ehe zu zerstören. Ektora hat eine Affäre mit seiner alten Flamme, und sie stellt sicher, dass Myrto darüber schriftlich erfährt, in einem lebendigen Tagebuch stehen Einzelheiten der Affäre, nachdem es vorbei ist. Aus diesem Grund und der Tatsache, dass Myrto auch gefangen Hector betrügt sie mit Stella, eine Bardame aus Mykonos, sie sich scheiden und einen Teil ihre eigenen Wege. Myrto erfüllen Lefteri, ein Mann um 10 Jahre jünger ist als sie und sie fallen in Liebe, aber sie zögert, sich zu verpflichten, ihn nicht wegen seiner Vergangenheit zu verurteilen, sondern der Altersunterschied. In der Nacht vor ihrer Hochzeit mit Lefteri, hat eine Affäre mit Myrto Ektora trotz dieser, Myrto und Lefteri noch als Myrto heiraten im Klaren, dass er nur mit ihr ins Bett, weil er sich nicht von billigen Lefteri in der Nähe seiner Tochter. Ektora hatte auch eine Affäre mit seiner Sekretärin in Planung sie zu heiraten, nachdem sie schwanger war, aber sie brachen die Verbindungen, als sie eine Fehlgeburt erlitt. Darüber hinaus Ioulia später schnitt sich auf eine giftige gemein, dass sie von der Hüfte abwärts gelähmt für 6 Monate, ging sie im Ausland für die Behandlung, und nicht aus, da zu hören war.

=== Antigoni and Vera ===
Myrto's and Stefano's youngest child Antigoni was taken by her best friend, Vera, 15 years ago, when Antigoni was 4 years old after Antigoni wondered off during a fight between Myrto and her now first husband, Stefanos. Vera was also having a 20-year affair with Stefanos during Myrto's and Stefanos's marriage; she marries Stefanos early in the first season. Soon after, Antigoni returns and despises her biological parents as she was led to believe by Vera that they treated her badly. When she realises that her parents truly love her, and missed her deeply, the secret of her kidnapping is exposes and she is ostracized by the family. Antigoni defends her saying that she is the only mother she has ever known, however Myrto and Vera's friendship is ruined forever. Later in the season, Antigoni marries Alexandros, Stefanos's henchman against her parents will, whom she only met months before their marriage. He is a golddigger, and Vera encouraged him to marry Antigoni as she is seeking revenge on Stefanos for ignoring her after the secret of the kidnapping is exposed. Vera is persistent with Stefanos refusing to let him push her out of his life and trying to make their marriage work.

=== Pavlos and Christina ===
Pavlos is Myrto's and Stefano's second child, and serves as the comic relief during this season. His relationship with Christina changes significantly throughout the season. It begins with her having complete control, but when Pavlos reverses the power he cheats on her with Ekctora's secretary's cousin. However, she moves back to London to continue with her studies and Pavlos and Christina are reunited at the end of the season.

=== Renos and Martha ===
Renos is Myrto's and Stefano's eldest son, at the start of the first season, he is having an affair with his childhood flame, Martha. She is married to Andreas, living in Mykonos in a loveless marriage, that she only went through with because she believed that her son, Panayioti was his. A paternity test is done and it is realised that Renos is the father of the child, and Martha and Renos officially become a couple. Within months they marry and Renos pressures Martha to make the move to Athens with her child. She reluctantly accepts, and Renos buys a new house which he tours with his son and his father, Stefanos. Panayioti falls off a third storey balcony during the tour and dies. Martha leaves Renos blaming him for the accident, she soon makes plans to move away from him and his family and make a new start. Shortly before she leaves she realises that she is still in love with Renos but decides to move forward with the leave as it will be the only way to leave behind the death of her son, during her farewell party her psychotic ex-husband sets a bomb, in the season finale all the core-characters are in the vicinity of the accident except Hector and Myrtle who run towards the house wondering if anyone has survived.
