= Erotas season 3 =

Erotas
- Season 3
- No. of episodes: 195

Release
- Original network: ANT1
- Original release: September 3, 2007 – May 30, 2008

Season chronology
- ← Previous; Season 2

Erotas season three is the third and final season of the Greek soap opera television series Erotas.

== Season 3 ==
Aphrodite Aperyi and Angelo board Myrto's cruise for her 50th birthday. Everyone enjoys the cruise and Myrto's birthday cake is cut. Overnight they arrive at Spetses, the cruise's destination. However, when everyone awakes the next morning they are shocked to find Angelo's dead body in the pool. Aphrodite immediately blames Ektora and Myrto. The mystery of who murdered Angelo begins.

== Prime suspects ==
- Myrto Anagnostou: conspired with Stefanos to get Angelo on the cruise.
- Ektoras Anagnostou: met with Aphrodite on the night of the murder.
- Aphrodite Aperyi: met with Ektora just before the murder occurred.
- Nadia Douka: probably not guilty, seen in flashbacks to be with Renos during the time of the murder, however it is unknown what happened afterward.
- Antigoni Douka: was angry at Angelo for not upholding their financial agreement.
- Stefanos Doukas: conspired with Myrto to get Angelo on the cruise.
- Tania Azaroglou: was angry with Angelo for exploiting her sister in law, took a pistol onto the cruise.
- Pavlos Doukas: said he would do anything to save his brother, implying he would commit murder.
- Renos Doukas: not guilty, seen in flashbacks with Nadia Douka at the time of the murder.

== Cast ==
=== Starring ===
- Koralia Karanti - Myrto Anagnostou
- Gregoris Valtinos - Ektoras Anagnostou
- George Ninios - Thanasis Avgeris (alias Petros Karras)
- Melpo Kosti - Elena Hatziyianni
- Stefanos Kiriakidis - Stefanos Doukas
- Dimitris Liakopoulos - Pavlos Doukas
- Maro Mavri - Nadia Douka
- Orestis Dourvas - Iasonas
- Yiannis Spaliaras - Alexandros Mavrakis
- Katerina Mantziou - Tania Azaroglou
- Vaso Laskaraki - Ariadni
- Patricia Peristeri - Christina Douka
- Yiannis Dritsas - Renos Doukas
- Rea Toutountzi - Tatiana

=== Also starring ===
- Thomas Kindinis - Miltiadis Hatziyiannis
- Mary Akrivopoulou - Athina Hatzigianni
- Christos Yiannaris - Antonis Ikonomou
- Victor Kolasis - Markos Anagnostou
- Stella Antipa - Eleftheria
- Dimitris Nasioulas - Dimitris Hatzis
- Vasilis Galeos - Andreas
- Olympia Papayianni - Eva Anagnostou (Season 3)

=== Recurring characters ===
- Alexandros Parthenis - Angelos Papadatos
- Adamantia Kontogiorgi - Antigoni Douka

== Synopsis ==
Two months after the murder, Aphrodite has moved to London and has asked a top-ranking policeman named Thanasis Avgeris (Angelo's uncle), to investigate his death. He goes under the alias Petros Karras and starts dating Myrto. Renos mysteriously returns to Greece. It is revealed through a series of flashbacks that he met with Nadia in Spetses on the night Angelo was murdered. The three prime suspects are Ektora, Myrto and Stefanos. However, Nadia, Renos, Tania and Antigoni had motive. Everyone accuses each other of the murder and Myrto and Ektora's relationship becomes strained as does Stefanos and Nadia's. Stefanos becomes increasingly paranoid. Tania and Alexandros also experience struggles, with Tania feeling uncomfortable in Spetses, unable to be anywhere near the scene of the crime.

While traveling in Malta with Petros Karras (Thanasis Avgeris), Myrto's partner Litra reopens the case with Myrto as the prime suspect. Myrto is taken in for a statement and is brought face to face with the man she once trusted. Myrto is charged with the murder. Karras joins Alexandros to discover the true murderer. Viewers soon find out that Tania is the killer. Feeling guilty, she confesses to Alexandros and wants to go and make her official statement.

Karras interrogates Tania about the murder. Alexandros tries to leave the country with her, but is caught by the police. Avgeri then tricks Tania into believing that Alexandros gave himself up as the murderer. Not wanting Alexandros to take the blame, Tania also confesses, before unsuccessfully attempting suicide in jail. Alexandros breaks her out of the hospital, only to have Tania give herself up so Alexandros doesn't get involved. She then refuses to speak to him. He proposes to her, saying he can't live without her.

Viewers see Alexandros trying to find evidence to clear Tania's name. A video he filmed after Angelo's murder shows Tania with no significant bruises to show that she had fought with Angelo. Karras goes to speak to Tania again and asks her why she hit Angelo so many times and she responds that she only hit him once. He asks whether he was standing or had fallen. She replies he was still standing. With Karras' assistance, they figure out that Tania did not kill Angelo. As Karras believes that Tania is not the murderer, he goes to be with his ex-wife who is dying of cancer and has to leave with her overseas. He tells Alexandros to keep looking.

In the meantime Antigoni (Myrto and Stefano's daughter) comes back to Athens with visible marks on her arm, suggesting she may have been Angelo's killer.

Pavlos catches his mother with Antigoni (whom he hates after she tormented her family by doing a deal with her fathers rival Angelo and holding a gun to Pavlos' head). Renos had told Pavlos in a prior episode that Antigoni was on the opposite island from Spetses.

Pavlos goes to Alexandros when he receives a call that he is needed at Spetses the next day because of a problem with the pool. He invites Alexandros to come with him and they go together.

=== Christina/Pavlos/Ariadni love triangle ===
As the third season begins, Christina and Pavlos are divorcing and either fight constantly or avoid each other. Rhey later realize their love for each other, and decide to get the divorce, but remain together as a couple. During this reunion, Pavlos resumes his relationship with Ariadni, who claims that she doesn't mind that Pavlos is with Christina, but is secretly plotting revenge.

Pavlos meets with Ariadni when they hear shotguns. Shortly after, Pavlos gets shot. He tells Ariadni to stay as he goes to Ektora who takes him to the hospital under a false name. He and his family try to keep his meeting with Ariadni a secret. He then realizes that he should not treat Christina that way and breaks up with Ariadni.

Bent on ruining Pavlos' life, Ariadni joins Avgeri and labels his family as the murderers.

After some time, Christina gets a call saying that the divorce has gone through. She realizes that she forgot to tell her lawyer to cancel the divorce. When Pavlos finds out he becomes angry, but then sees the romance in remarrying Christina.

When Ariadni finds out, she tries to stop the wedding, even planning to claim that she is having a second affair with Pavlos. Renos and Dimitri stop her. After the honeymoon, she tells Christina, who in turn claims that Ariadni manipulated both her and Pavlos.

=== Athina/Antonis/Dimitri love triangle ===
Eleni Hatziyianni, Mirto's best friend from her childhood, returns to Mirto's life in Spetses during the season premiere, where her daughter Athina is married to Antonis Ikonomou. However, on the day of her wedding her past lover Dimitri returns, whom she had lied to about her identity because she is a politician's daughter. He demands that she not get married, however, she does anyway, because she knows that she must since her husband works with her father politically. The marriage goes wrong quickly, and Athina resumes her affair with Dimitri after her husband hits her. She and Dimitri then escape and live in Renos' apartment for a while until scandal erupts, and so the couple goes to Spetses to get away from Adonis who is stalking them. Adonis then follows them and whilst Dimitri is working he gets the key to Athena's room and gives her 24 hours to come back to him. She refuses him. When he takes action and causes Dimitri distress, he goes again to her room and forces her to write a heartbreaking letter to Dimitri breaking up with him and telling him that she is going back to Adonis.

=== Elena and Miltiadis marriage complications ===
Elena Hatziyianni is a reserved politician's wife. Myrto immediately realizes that she doesn't know how to relax and worries for her friend. One night in Spetses, Myrto takes Elena out drinking on the beach. They see Miltiadis, Elena's husband with an unidentified woman. She confronts him about it, and he says that he has been dating her for years. Elena attempts suicide, in order to guilt Miltiadis into staying with her. However, she doesn't tell her daughter Athina why she tried to commit suicide and uses it to her advantage.

=== Nafsika ===
After weeks of not actually having seen the 'diamond ringed' woman Nafsika's face, viewers are introduced to a woman who we recognize to perhaps be Nafsika having a secret meeting with Andonis. So far Nafsika has been seen linked to Andonis, Stefanos, and possibly Alexandros, and Ariadni, who has introduced Renos, Dimitri, Pavlos and Christina to her.
