= Duke (film) =

- Directed by: Anthony and James Gaudioso
- Written by: Anthony Gaudioso
- Produced by: Anthony Gaudioso; James Gaudioso; Nancy Leopardi; Ross Kohn; Carmine Giovinazzo
- Starring: Carmine Giovinazzo; Hank Harris
- Cinematography: Jayson Crothers
- Edited by: Josh Rifkin
- Music by: Bill Brown
- Distributed by: Gravitas Ventures
- Release date: February 19, 2019 (Houston)
- Running time: 107 minutes
- Country: United States
- Language: English

Duke is a 2019 American crime drama film starring Carmine Giovinazzo and Hank Harris.

== Plot ==
Two siblings are driven to heroic extremes by childhood trauma.

== Cast ==
- Carmine Giovinazzo as Dare
- Hank Harris as Roost
- Michael Monks as Collins
- Anthony Gaudioso as Morrison
- Lesley-Ann Brandt as Violet
- James Gaudioso as Joan 'J-Bird'
- Michael Irby as Evelio
- Michael Bowen as Sgt. Roman
- Carmen Argenziano as Lt. Brannigan
- Richard Portnow as Carroll Green
- Richard Roundtree as J.T.
- Vanessa Ferlito as Cookie
- Maurice Benard as Winky

== Release ==
The film was released in Houston on February 19, 2019.

== Reception ==
Joe Leydon of Variety gave the film a positive review, calling it "an uneven but arresting indie thriller about two siblings who are driven to heroic extremes by childhood traumas."
