= Aggeliki Daliani =

Greek actress

- Born: Aggeliki Daliani; August 11, 1979 (age 47); Athens, Greece
- Education: National and Kapodistrian University of Athens; Hellenic Open University
- Occupations: Actress, former Reporter
- Years active: 2004–present
- Spouse: Manos Papayiannis (m. 2009)
- Children: Lydia Papayianni; Nikitas Papayiannis
- Parent(s): Nikitas Dalianis; Voula Daliani
- Relatives: Panagiota Daliani (sister)

Aggeliki Daliani (Greek: Αγγελική Δαλιάνη; born August 11, 1979) is a Greek actress and entrepreneur. She is best known for her role as Maria in Maria, i Aschimi, the Greek edition of the television series Betty la Fea.

== Early life ==
Daliani was born on August 11, 1979, in Athens even her origin is from Kalamata. She has a 6-year younger sister Panagiota Daliani. She graduated the Department of Communication and Media Studies of the National and Kapodistrian University of Athens and the Department of the Greek Culture of the Hellenic Open University. She worked as a reporter for 5 years in a gossip magazine. She left reporting for acting.

== Career ==
In 2005, she made her television debut in ANT1 series "Min Mou Les Antio" with a recurring role of 10 episodes. In 2006 she had a guest role for 2 episodes in Mega series "Hrthe kai Edese".

In 2006, she passed from audition for the role of Maria Papasotiriou in Mega series Maria, i Aschimi, the Greek edition of the television series Betty la Fea. It was her first main role in a television series. The series were viewed for 2 seasons between 2007 and 2008. But due to the success of the series, she decided with the channel to be appearing with her ugly look during the first time of the series viewing. However, the press found and showed old photographs with her normal look. This series made her known in the public and during that time, she was the most popular person in the country.

After the end of the series, she appeared in her third Mega series called "Ola ston Aera" with a Guest role in 1 episode. During the episode filming, she was pregnant in her first child.

In theatre, she has appeared in numerous theatrical performances such as: "The Bacchae" (2004-2005), "Erotika Paixnidia" (2006-2007), "To Asximopapo" (2007-2008), "Den Plirono, Den Plirono" (2008-2009), "Paizoun to Tragoudi Mas" (2010-2012), "The Miracle Worker" (2012-2013), "Pontikopagida" (2014-2015), "Boeing Boeing" (2016-2018) and "My Friend Lefterakis" (Summer 2018).

In 2019, she returned to television after a 10-year absence with her second in her career and her first main role since Maria, i Aschimi in ANT1 series "H Epistrofi" in the role of "Athena Sideri". Her main role started from the 85th episode.

== Personal life ==
In 2003, Daliani began dating actor Manos Papayiannis. On May 3, 2009, she gave birth to their first child, a daughter, Lydia Papayianni and on September 12, 2009, the couple married. On September 16, 2017, Daliani gave birth to their second child, a son, Nikitas Papayiannis, who was born earlier in 8 months.
In August 2013, Daliani and Papayiannis opened a Cafeteria-Bar called "Sweeney Todd".

== Filmography ==
=== Television ===
Year	Title	Channel	Role	Notes
2005	Min Mou Les Antio	ANT1	Aggeliki	Recurring Role (10 Episodes)
2006	Hrthe kai Edese	Mega	Anna	Guest Role (2 Episodes)
2007-2008	Maria, i Aschimi	Mega	Maria Papasotiriou	Main Role (All 301 Episodes)
2009	Ola ston Aera	Mega	Sarah	Episode:"And the Wife Shall Revere Her Husband"
2012-2013	Dr.Cook	Mega	Herself	Co-Presenter
2019	H Epistrofi	ANT1	Athena Sideri	Main Role (Starting from 85th Episode until Series Finale/78 Episodes)

=== Theatre ===
Year	Title	Theater
2004-2005	The Bacchae	Theater of Art "Charles Kunn"
2006-2007	Erotika Paixnidia	Theater "Park"
2007-2008	To Asximopapo	Badminton Theater
2008-2009	Den Plirono, Den Plirono	Theater "Alekos Alexandrakis"
2010-2012	Paizoun to Tragoudi Mas	Theater "Anesis"
2012-2013	The Miracle Worker	Theater "Brodway"
2014-2015	Pontikopagida	Theater "Veaki"
2016-2018	Boeing-Boeing	Theater "Hitirio"
2018 (Summer)	My Friend Lefterakis	Theater "Hitirio"
