= Papayiannis =

Papayiannis is a Greek surname Παπαγιάννης. Notable people with the surname include:

- Manos Papayiannis (born 1966), Greek fashion model and actor
- Thodoros Papayiannis, Greek sculptor

== See also ==
- Athina Papayianni (born 1980), Greek race walker
