= Antidote (2021 film) =

- Directed by: Peter Daskaloff (Director); Alexi Stavrou (Assistant Director)
- Written by: Peter Daskaloff; Matthew Toronto
- Produced by: Peter Daskaloff (Executive Producer); Ian Michaels (Executive Producer); Alexi Stavrou; Ashlynn Yennie; Maria Jorjezian (Line Producer); Olivia Daskaloff (Associate Producer)
- Starring: Louis Mandylor; Ashlynn Yennie; Yorgos Karamihos; Augie Duke; Christos Vasilopoulos; Gina Venditti
- Cinematography: Lucas Pitassi
- Edited by: Vanagan Gaboudian
- Music by: Ryan Harrison; Kohld Wintertide; Joshua Seigel; David Valdovinos
- Production company: Uncork'd Entertainment
- Release date: 11 May 2021 (Streaming)
- Running time: 88 minutes
- Country: United States
- Language: English

Antidote is a 2021 science fiction horror film written and directed by Peter Daskaloff along with Matthew Toronto.

== Plot ==
At the hospital, Sharyn Berkley is informed that she has acute appendicitis and requires emergency surgery. After awakening, she is greeted by Dr. Aaron Hellenbach and finds that her incisions have almost fully healed. She questions this and is told that the facility has unconventional healing methods. She flees her room before being sedated by staff.

Sharyn meets fellow patients Cassandra Franklin, Rizzo, Marjorie, Lester, and Everett, a criminal attorney who claims his tongue was cut out but grew back. Cassandra explains that they are in an experimental facility and that Sharyn was burned alive. Rizzo is selected for a procedure during the "Indexing" and reveals that he had been impaled.

Hellenbach finds Sharyn wandering the halls and takes her to his office. He allows her use the phone if she tells him about her ex-boyfriend, Nico, a drug trafficker who committed suicide. She attempts to call her family, but the phone does not work. She later finds a room containing a piano and a noose. As punishment for breaking the rules, her leg is amputated and reattached. Rizzo shares his theory that the military is harvesting test subjects to develop immortal soldiers. Sharyn tries and fails to escape again.

Everett tells Sharyn that if they cooperate, they will be released in three months. After Sharyn reveals that she saw Nico in the facility after his supposed death, Everett confronts Hellenbach. Hellenbach promises that he will be evaluated in three months; when Everett argues, his tongue is severed again.

Sharyn and Cassandra manage to steal Hellenbach's keys and find a map of the facility without being caught by Hellenbach, but several staff recognize and corner them in the hallway. Cassandra attempts suicide by slitting her throat, allowing Sharyn to flee. Rizzo protects her from a violent Lester, but later molests her while hiding in an empty room during the Indexing; she rips off his testicles.

Sharyn manages to escape, triggering an alarm. She finds her way to a residential home, but is followed by a staff member and returned to the facility. Upon awakening, Sharyn finds herself being hanged in the piano room. She asks Hellenbach why he keeps healing her instead of killing her, but he says the facility does not kill people.

A still-alive Cassandra confides that she deserves her continuous immolation, revealing that during life, she broke into a mink farm, released the minks, and set the farm ablaze, killing the farmers that were still inside - she had known they were there, but believed they deserved their fate. Cassandra claims death is their only escape, but Sharyn hypothesizes that they are already dead and in Hell, revealing that she accidentally killed Nico ten years ago and framed his death as a suicide.

Sharyn confronts Hellenbach, who reveals that everyone in the facility is a patient, including him. He spent his life causing overdoses by overprescribing opiates to his patients. Upon arrival in Hell in 1969, he perpetually overdosed on bile. He explains that after three months, each patient is allowed to begin torturing others and continuously punished until they comply. Sharyn asks if there is any way to die permanently, but Hellenbach denies this.

Nico appears and drags Sharyn out of Hellenbach's office. She expresses remorse and begs him to let her die, but he refuses. They are confronted by Hellenbach while leaving, but Nico overpowers him. After traversing the halls, they find themselves at the edge of a cliff above lava. Sharyn bids Nico goodbye and attempts to walk off the edge. A path forms across the lava as doctors resuscitate Sharyn's body on Earth. Sharyn makes it to the other side, but Nico cannot follow.

Sharyn awakes in the hospital and discovers that she was placed into a medically induced coma due to complications from the surgery, and was clinically dead for about fifteen seconds. Sharyn's husband and daughter enter the room to greet her.

Once home, Sharyn finds an article about Dr. Hellenbach on the internet, confirming his story. She also finds articles related to Cassandra Franklin, who died following a mushroom poisoning. Sharyn later visits and places flowers on Nico's grave.

== Cast ==
- Ashlynn Yennie as Sharyn Berkley
- Louis Mandylor as Dr. Aaron Hellenbach
- Yorgos Karamihos as Costas Aetos
- Augie Duke as Cassandra Franklin
- Ravi Naidu as Everett
- Christos Vasilopoulos as Rizzo
- Scott Alin as Nico Cash
- Elli Rahn as Hector
- Olive Hoffman as Ashley Aetos
- Jeremy Walker as Dr. Merritt
- Alexi Stavrou as Lester

== Production ==
Antidote was filmed in Los Angeles, California.

== Reception ==
Rotten Tomatoes reports that 60% of critics gave the film a positive review with an average score of 5.3/10, based on 5 reviews.

Enrique Acosta, writing for Film Threat, said, "Antidote is a credible effort. I would love to see what Mr. Daskaloff might create with a decent budget. If you get a chance, I recommend you check this one out."
