= Anthony and James Gaudioso =

American identical twin actors

Anthony Gaudioso James Gaudioso
- Born: Crystal Lake, Illinois
- Years active: 2004 - Current

Anthony Gaudioso and James Gaudioso (birth date November 29) are American identical twin actors, producers, and directors known for Medium (2007), The Ghost and The Whale (2017), Duke (2019) and the upcoming Bloodline Killer.

== Early life ==
Born in Crystal Lake, Illinois and later raised in Long Island, the twins began a career in acting at an early age, appearing in mainstream commercials and off-Broadway shows. In 1997, they were discovered by Spike Lee during a national search of over twenty thousand New Yorkers to be featured in a string of commercials for Nike and Finish Line. In an effort to further pursue their interests, Anthony went on to receive a film degree from LIU Post while training under Stella Adler, Bill Howey and Ivana Chubbuck. During this time, James trained under Betsy Parrish, who is known for training award-winning actress Meryl Streep. In 2005, the twins were named Top 25 to watch in indie film by Vanity Fair in their annual Rising Star campaign where they were featured alongside Oscar nominee Catalina Sandino Moreno and Lucas Black.

== Career ==
The brothers would move to Los Angeles to further pursue their career in film and quickly founded their own production company, Gaudioso Twin Films, which produces anything from commercials to feature-length projects. The brothers directed their first film in 2007, Medium, which caught the attention of New York socialite Cornelia Guest who ultimately referenced the twins to the editors of Vanity Fair. They collaborated with Jonathan Pryce in 2017 on the film, The Ghost and the Whale and the film would go on to receive the People's Choice Best Picture Award at the Hollywood Reel Independent Film Festival and Anthony was nominated to the Sag ballot for his role as Jack Lee. Later that year, the brothers co-wrote, starred and directed Duke, a western movie set in contemporary Los Angeles. James has twice auditioned to play the son of Daniel Day-Lewis, first in The Ballad of Jack and Rose and later as H.W. in There Will Be Blood The Gaudioso Twins will be directing the indie feature She's Still Here, which will begin principal photography in December 2020 and is set to star Mickey Rourke, Nick Stahl, Christina Ricci, and Jennifer Carpenter. They directed the horror film Bloodline Killer that is planned to be released in late 2023.

== Filmography ==
Anthony Gaudioso
Year	Work	Role	Notes
2000	The Yards	Young Party Supporter	Uncredited
2005	In the Glimmer	Patrick	Writer and director
2007	Medium	Ricky	Writer and director
2008	Ibanker	Michael Baci	TV movie
2008	Danny Fricke	Javier Vicente	TV movie
2009	Twenty Something	Sean	Episode "Sleepless in Miami" / Director
2009	Sanctuary		Director
2010	CSI: Miami	Fresh-Faced Lawyer	Episode: "Come Watch Me Die"
2011	Blood Canvas		
2012	Nesting	Officer Kelly	
2012	Sassy Pants	Oversized Senior	
2013	Shrader House	Officer Michael Spagnoli	TV movie
2015	I Love You... But I Lied	Kevin	TV series
2016	Me You and Five Bucks	Will the Manager	
2017	The Ghost and the Whale	Jack Lee	Writer and director
2017	Charlie		Writer
2019	Duke	Morrison	Writer and director
2020	What Josiah Saw	Roy Roy	Currently in post-production
2021	She's Still Here	Chris Cleary	Director
2022	Sweet Sixteen	The Stranger	
2024	Bloodline Killer		Writer and producer
James Gaudioso
Year	Work	Role	Notes
2004	The Jersey	Kid	TV series
2005	In the Glimmer	Shawn	Short
2007	Medium	Jobe	Writer and Director
2008	Danny Fricke	Matias Vicente	TV movie
2011	American Horror Story	Sal	Episode: "Murder House"
2013	Chasing Taste	Produce Market Cashier	
2013	Shrader House	Officer Kenneth Gilardi	TV movie
2015	Unsullied	Mason	
2015	I Love You... But I Lied	Daniel	TV series
2016	Lady Gaga: G.U.Y.	Businessman	Video Short
2016	Killing Frisco	Eunice	
2016	*69	St. Nick	
2016	Me You and Five Bucks	Bill the Manager	
2017	Charlie		Writer and director
2017	The Ghost and the Whale	Ed Hale	Director
2019	Babysplitters	Evan	
2019	Duke	Joan 'J-Bird'	Director
2021	She's Still Here		Director
2022	Sweet Sixteen		Director
2024	Bloodline Killer		Writer and producer
