= I Polykatoikia =

- H Πολυκατοικία
- Genre: Comedy
- Created by: Vasilis Spiliopoulos; Vicky Alexopoulou; Constantine Ganosis
- Starring: Pavlos Chaikalis; Vasiliki Andritsou; Charis Asimakopoulos; Vilma Tsakiri; Vaso Laskaraki; Giannis Tsimitselis; Antigoni Glykofridi; Martha Voursi; Dimiris Kouroumpalis; Elena Asimakopoulou
- Opening theme: I Agapi pou menei by Michalis Hatzigiannis
- Ending theme: I Agapi pou menei by Michalis Hatzigiannis
- Country of origin: Greece
- Original language: Greek
- No. of seasons: 3
- No. of episodes: 132

Production
- Executive producer: Vasilis Thomopoulos
- Production location: Athens
- Running time: 45-48 minutes
- Production company: Anosis A.E

Original release
- Network: Mega Channel
- Release: October 6, 2008 – May 27, 2011

Related
- Aquí no hay quien viva (2003)

I Polykatoikia (The Block of Flats) (Greek: H Πολυκατοικία), is a popular Greek Comedy television series, originally broadcast on Mega Channel and lasting for three seasons, from October 6, 2008 until May 27, 2011. It consists of 132 episodes. The script of each of the first 90 episodes was taken from the Spanish series Aquí no hay quien viva.

== Plot ==
This is a story of a "typical" apartment building at 19 Alamanas Street in downtown Athens. Thanasis Balafoutis (Pavlos Chaikalis) is the apartment manager and he's working hard to support his wife Margarita, his son Petros and his daughter Natali. Konstantinos, Natali's boyfriend, is a resourceful person who is currently unemployed and he doing Janitor services. Natali is also unemployed and kind of lazy.

Loukia works in a magazine as the manager of her boyfriend Takis but they keep their relationship as a secret at work. Tzovani is an immigrant from Albania with a wealthy job. He is married with Tzouli, ex Miss Albania and they have a daughter Romina who managed to pass the exams in medicine school. Markos and Hristos are a gay couple and Vasiliki(who also is still a virgin), Panagiota and Mary are the oldest tenants who are still looking to find their partners.

Eleni is a lyricist with a low income. She is insecure and believes that she has bad luck, especially with men. Everyone goes through difficult situations, which are presented to the public in a hilarious manner. On the surface, nobody likes anyone, but when they are in trouble, they come together for one purpose: "the good of the apartment building."

== Cast ==
Main Characters

Actor	Role
Pavlos Chaikalis	Thanasis Mpalafoutis
Vasiliki Andritsou	Eleni Sotiropoulou
Charis Asimakopoulos	Markos Androutsos
Vilma Tsakiri	Mary Stathatou
Vaso Laskaraki	Loukia Asimaki
Giannis Tsimitselis	Takis Peristeris
Antigoni Glykofridi	Vasiliki Stathatou
Martha Vourtsi	Panagiota Petrocheilou
Dimitris Kouroumpalis	Manolis Galatsanos
Elena Asimakopoulou	Aliki Kontogiorgou
Nikos Poursanidis	Christos leventis
Nikoleta Vlavianou	Margarita Mpalafouti
Alexandros Giannou	Tzimis Fitros
Christodoulos Stylianou	Apostolis Petrocheilos
Kostas Flokatoulas	Argyris Galatsanos
Andreas Kontopoulos	Stavros Zacharakis
Despoina Mpougiatioti	Natali Mpalafouti
Giorgos Liatis	Petros Mpalafoutis
Giannis Vouros	Andreas Matsoukas
Yolanda Mpalaoura	Elpida Matsouka
Dimitris Tsoukalas	Nikos Matsoukas
konstantinos Famis	Giorgos Matsoukas
Eftychia Sideri	Anna
Nikoleta Karra	Tzouli Skreki
Pavlos Orkopoulos	Jovanni Skrekis
Evgenia Tsaousi	Romina Skreki
Giannis Papazisis	Konstantinos Saltamouris
Dimitris Liakopoulos	Stefanos

Cameo Characters

Actor	Role
Eleni Krita	Litsa Mpalafouti
Eudokía Roumelioti	Mpetti Polychroniou
Nefeli Orfanou	Tzortzia Sotiropoulou
Ilias Zervos	Pantelis Asimakis
Thanasis Tsaltampasis	Miltos
Titika Siriggouli	-
Apostolia Zoi	Stella
Rea Karagiannidou	Katia
Grigoris Stamoulis	Michalis
Natassa Marmataki	Meni
Theofania Papathoma	Elektra Akrivou
Giannis Evaggelidis	Filippos
Spiros Poulis	Mechanic
