= Hold On (2019 film) =

- Directed by: Tarek Tohme
- Written by: Tarek Tohme
- Produced by: Tarek Tohme; Cemi Guzman; Micayla De Ette
- Starring: Luis Guzmán; Maurice Benard; Flavor Flav; Beth Grant; Tarek Tohme; Micayla De Ette
- Cinematography: Jonathan Pope
- Edited by: Nicholas D. Johnson
- Music by: Nathan Matthew David; Jeremy Lamb
- Production companies: Flipped Out Entertainment; Joule Entertainment; Stone Canyon Pictures
- Distributed by: Film Bureau
- Release date: December 6, 2019
- Running time: 106 minutes
- Country: United States
- Language: English

Hold On is a 2019 American drama film written and directed by Tarek Tohme and starring Luis Guzmán, Maurice Benard, Flavor Flav, Beth Grant, Tohme and Micayla De Ette.

== Cast ==
- Luis Guzman as Pastor Rivera
- Maurice Benard as Peter Duran
- Flavor Flav as Officer Drayton
- Beth Grant as Shelly
- Tarek Tohme as Vic Duran
- Micayla De Ette as Sidney Rhodes

== Release ==
The film was released in select theaters on December 6, 2019.

== Reception ==
Lynette Nicholas of Common Sense Media noted the film's powerful message while referencing what they believed to be a predictable plot.

Scott Craven of The Arizona Republic wrote, "Hold On proves De Ette a talented singer, one destined for success."
