= Skin Diamond =

American actress, model, musician and former pornographic actor

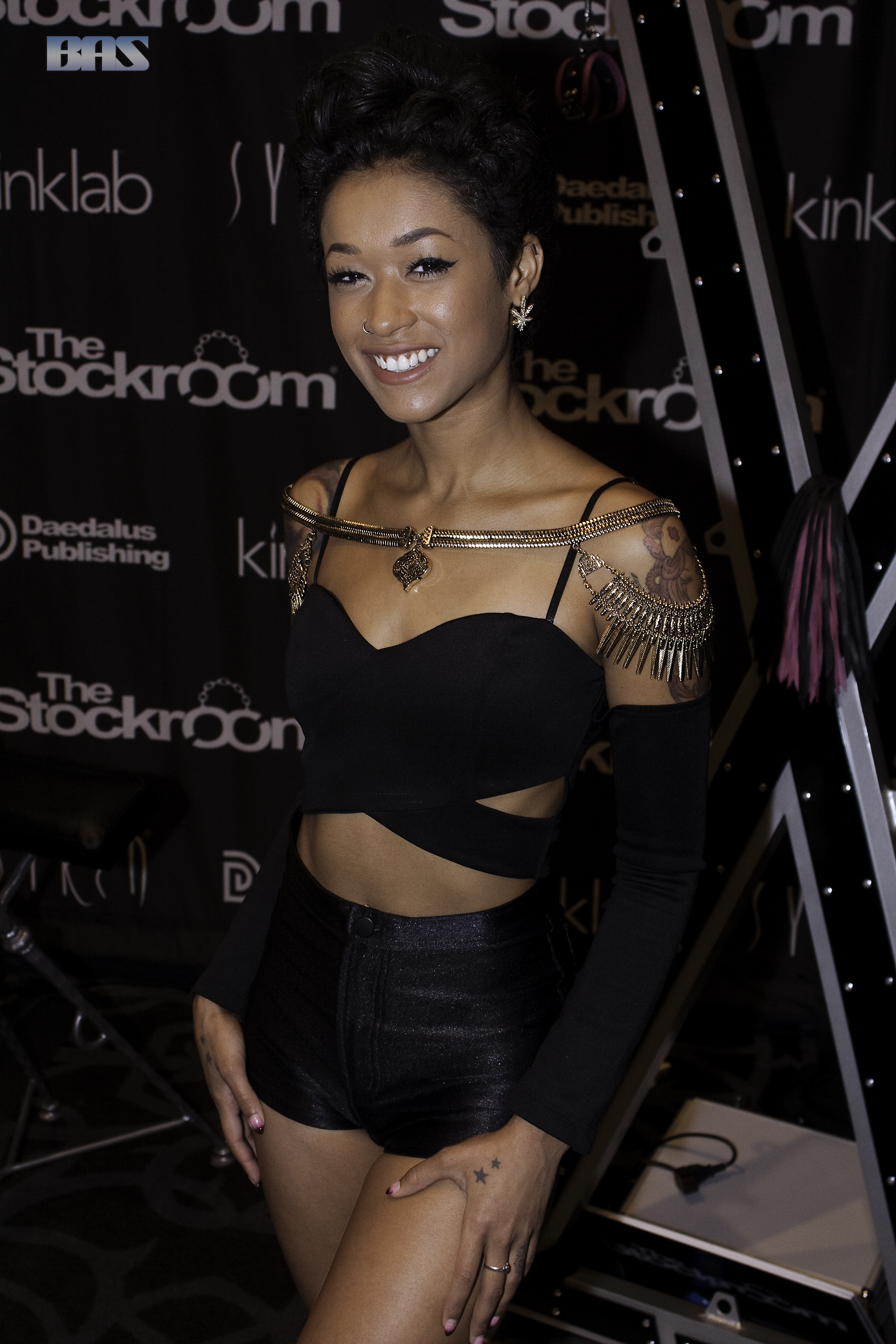
- Skin Diamond at AVN Adult Entertainment Expo 2016
- Born: Raylin Christensen; 1987 (age 38–39); Ventura, California, U.S.
- Other name: Raylin Joy
- Occupations: Actress; model; singer-songwriter; pornographic actress
- Agent: Mark Spiegler
- Website: skindiamondvip.com

Raylin Joy (born 1987), formerly known by her stage name Skin Diamond, is an American actress, model, singer-songwriter and retired pornographic actress. Joy left adult film in 2016 to pursue other interests such as songwriting and mainstream acting.

== Early life ==
Joy was born Raylin Christensen in 1987 in Ventura, California. She was raised in Dunfermline, Scotland where her parents took up positions as missionaries. She is of Ethiopian, Danish, Czech, Yugoslavian, and German descent.

== Career ==
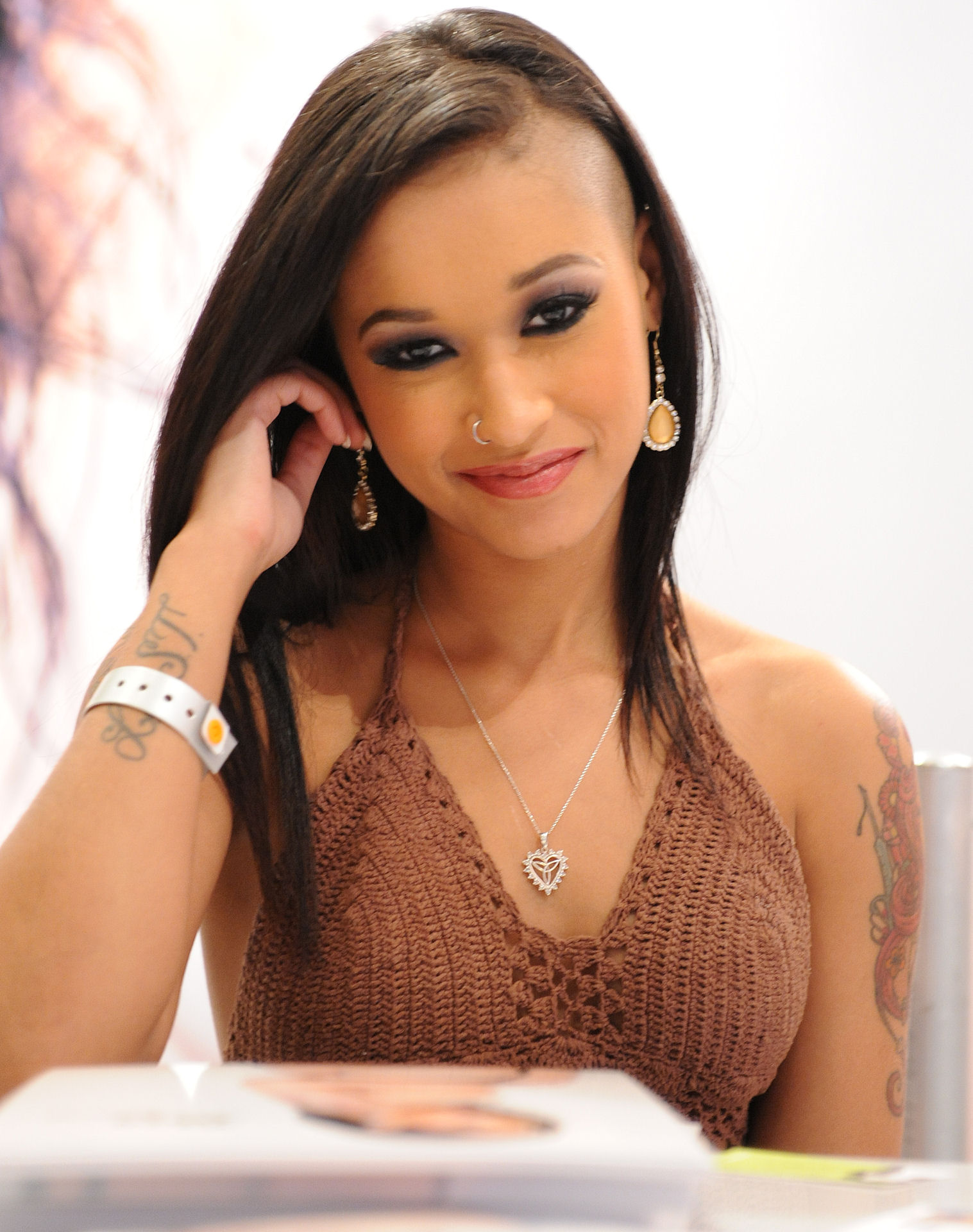
Joy at AVN Adult Entertainment Expo in 2012

Joy started her career as an alternative model posing for GodsGirls, before branching out into art modeling and fetish modeling for photographers in Europe and the United States. Her unique look attracted the attention of a wide variety of photographers.

In 2009, she posed on the cover of Bizarre winning their first ever "Cover Girl Search" competition, after which she was signed to London-based modeling agency Girl Management. She also entered the adult film industry in 2009, performing her first scenes with Joanna Angel and James Deen for Burning Angel.

In 2011, she posed in an editorial campaign for i-D magazine's "The Exhibitionist Issue No. 312" wearing Louis Vuitton and American Apparel.

In 2012, Joy posed for comic book artist David Mack, who portrayed her as Echo in the Marvel Comics miniseries Daredevil: End of Days.

Joy first dabbled in the music industry with her 2013 song/music video "Sex in a Slaughter House". which she wrote as part of a scene for Brazzers.

Joy was on CNBC's list of "The Dirty Dozen: Porn's Most Popular Stars" in 2014, 2015, and 2016. Diamond also starred (with Allie Haze) in the music video for American hip hop recording artist B.o.B, for his song "John Doe", which features Priscilla Renea.

Joy was the Penthouse Pet of the Month for July 2014. That same year, she made her directorial debut with the film Skin Diamond's Dollhouse for Deviant Entertainment.

In 2015, Joy was named Penthouse Pet of the Year Runner-up.

In 2016, Joy performed her last adult film scenes to pursue mainstream acting and singing full-time, after she was cast in the role of Dylan Quinn in Submission, a series on Showtime exploring BDSM themes. It was also during this time period that she launched her music project with the release of her first official single and music video ("Fire" produced by Ben Cole) under her real name, "Raylin Joy". She briefly posed for Dechristo Studios in 2019 in a shoot for Penthouse magazine

In April 2020, Joy and eleven other adult/former adult actresses appeared in the music video for the G-Eazy song "Still Be Friends".

Since 2024, Joy is the lead singer for the reggae-rooted, punk-flavored quartet The Calamatix.

== Personal life ==
Joy's father is Rodd Christensen, who was a famous actor in the United Kingdom. Between 2002 and 2005, he appeared in Balamory in the role of Spencer, a painter and musician. She has two piercings in her navel, and one in her right nostril. She is also well known for her distinctive shaved-on-one-side haircut; because of this, she has been featured in the column "Beauty Showdown" in the magazine Cosmopolitan. When she first entered the adult film industry, her hair was pink. She is bisexual.

== Filmography ==
=== Television ===
Year	Title	Role	Notes
2016	Submission	Dylan Quinn	Second role

== Awards ==
List of accolades
Awards
Award	Won
AVN Awards	4
Inked Awards	2
XBIZ Awards	1
Urban X Awards	2
- Total numbers of wins
Totals	9

Year	Ceremony	Award	Work
2012	Urban X Award	Female Performer of the Year	—N/a
2013	XBIZ Award	Best Supporting Actress	Revenge of the Petites
2014	AVN Award	Best Double Penetration Sex Scene (with Marco Banderas & Prince Yahshua)	Skin
2014	AVN Award	Best Oral Sex Scene	Skin
2014	Inked Award	Performer of the Year	—N/a
2015	Inked Award	Group Scene of the Year (with Joanna Angel, Kleio Valentien, Natalia Marie, James Deen, Mr. Pete, & Mick Blue)	All About That Orgy
2021	AVN Award	Mainstream Venture of the Year	—N/a
2022	AVN Award	Best Oral Sex Scene (with Riley Reid & Winston Burbank)	Oral Queens Riley Reid and Skin Diamond Give Spit Filled Sloppy Blowjob
2024	Urban X Award	Hall of Fame	—N/a

== Discography ==
- 2016: "Fire" (single)
- 2016: "All Night" (single)
- 2016: "Feel Me" (single)
- 2016: "Karma" (single)
- 2016: "Sunny Grey" (single)
- 2017: "Wet Dreams" (single)
- 2017: "Freak" (single)
- 2024: "The Calamatix" (LP)
