= Yorgos Karamihos =

Greek actor

- Γιώργος Καραμίχος
- Born: 3 January 1974 (age 52); Veria, Greece
- Occupation: Actor

Yorgos Karamihos (Greek: Γιώργος Καραμίχος; born on January 3, 1974) is a Greek actor.

== Biography ==
Yorgos Karamihos is a graduate of the History Department of the Ionian University and the Higher School of Dramatic Art of the National Theater of Greece. He has a long career in the theater, with performances at the National Theater. He also appeared in many movies and TV productions, including The Durrells (2016–2019), a British TV series, where he played Theodore Stephanides.

== Filmography ==
=== Film ===
Year	Title	Role	Notes	Ref.
1998	Money: A mythology of darkness	Himself (narrator)	Film debut	
1999	Soil & Water	Nikolas		
2001	Save Me	Mimis		
2001	Sudden braking		short film	
2003	Liza and all the others	Giannis		
2003	Destroy all brains!		short film	
2003	Oxygen	waiter		
2003	What a wonderful day...	Dimitris		
2003	The actresses	Theodosios		
2004	Is God a chef?	Thodoros Notaras		
2005	Between Friends			
2006	Five minutes left	Patroklos		
2007	Fugitive Pieces	Ioannis		
2007	El Greco	Titian's assisant		
2008	The wedding party	Mani		
2008	Tale 52	Iasonas' voice		
2008	Just Broke Up	Dimitris		
2008	My doll		short film	
2008	Doves		short film	
2008	Demetra's Dream	Apollo	short film	
2008	Beware of bear		short film	
2008	Well Kept Secrets, Athanassia	Hristos		
2010	Stillness	Aris		
2011	Without borders	Yorgos		
2011	Dos	Patroklos		
2012	The Way of Styx	Nikos	short film	
2014	Cineastes	man		
2014	Maestro		short film	
2015	Bad Rage	Alex		
2016	Short fuse	lawyer		
2016	You Only Live Once	Prometheus		
2016	Ben-Hur	Sick Oarsman		
2017	Love Is...	Larry		
2018	Paul, Apostle of Christ	Saul of Tarsus		
2018	Sergey's Fortune	Sergey		
2020	In plaster	Brain (voice)	short film	
2021	Antidote	Costas		
2021	Flik flok	Kyriakos	short film	
2023	Yiacemi	George	short film; also co-producer	
2024	Stelios	Makis Matsas		
2024	I've something to tell you	Himself	cameo appearance	
	Sound of Silence	Nikos	upcoming film	

=== Television ===
Year	Title	Role(s)	Notes
2001	Secret Routes		Episode: "Haunted Houses"
2001	Red Circle	Grigoris	Episode: "Mum"
2001	Red Circle	rapist	Episode: "Woman's day"
2002	Red Circle	Petros	Episode: "Happy end"
2002	Red Circle	policeman #2	Episode: "Trojan War"
2002-2003	Go Away	Lucas	Main role, 20 episodes
2003	I die for you	gun seller	1 episode
2003-2004	Leni	Spyros Pavlou	Main role, 20 episodes
2004	The Nanny	Antonis Zafeiriou	1 episode
2004-2005	Nobody says I love you	Charis Markatos	Lead role, 32 episodes
2004-2006	Joy's café	Aris Sergianopoulos	14 episodes
2005	10th commandment	Mark	Episode: "In a close family circle"
2005	10th commandment	Argyris	Episode: "Broken doll"
2005-2006	The contact	Marios Petridis	Lead role, 28 episodes
2006	10th commandment	Nicolas	Episode: "The escape"
2006	10th commandment	Kostis	Episode: "Fallen"
2006	Marriage with everything	Tryfon Karapiperis	Episode: "Marriage is a prison"
2006-2007	The last show	Dimitris Horn	Main role, 13 episodes
2006-2007	Are you kidding me?	Yannis Despotidis	Lead role, 17 episodes
2007	Honorable Cuckolds	Michalis Tsaousoglou	Episode: "The Activist Cuckold"
2007	Honorable Cuckolds	Dinos	Episode: "The Jealous Cuckold"
2008	True Loves	Manos	Episode: "A man on bus stop"
2008	I saw you	Vasilis	Episode: "Ladybug"
2008	The stories of detective Bekas	Stelios Daponde	4 episodes
2008-2009	Farewell Anatolia	Manolis Axiotis	Lead role, 21 episodes
2009-2011	Dreamcatcher	Petros Valianos	Lead role, 34 episodes
2011	No if you receive more than the one who doesn't have	historian professor (voice role)	Episode: "The revolution"
2016	NCIS	officer Kohl	Episode: "Family first"
2016-2019	The Durrells	Theo Stephanides	Main role, 26 episodes
2018	Genius	Paul Arrighi	Episode: "Picasso Chapter Ten"
2020	Bulletproof	Stefan	1 episode
2020-2022	Sun	Dimitris Lainas	Lead role, 284 episodes
2022	30's Generation		Episode: "M. Karagatsis"
2022	A night in August	Manolis Vandoulakis	Lead role, 14 episodes
2022-2025	Say the word	Himself (host)	Weekend game show on ERT1
2023	Zoe	Nikolas Ksekarfotos	Episode: "Paul"
2023	Herrhausen: The Banker and the Bomb	Hurtado	1 episode
2023	The Doctor	Achilleas Kassandrinos	Episode: "Poisons"
2024	Kostas	Zenos	2 episodes
2024-2025	Deserted Land	Manos	Lead role, 12 episodes
2025	Kabul	Italian ambassador	Episode: "La chute"
2025	Very awful ideas	russian mobster	1 episode
2025	Malice	Nikos	2 episodes
2025-2026	Holy Love	Andreas Ioannou	Main role, 80 episodes
2026	Daredevil: Born Again	Christophis Savvas	5 episodes
