= Bloodline Killer =

2024 film by Ante Novakovic

- Theatrical release poster
- Directed by: Ante Novakovic
- Written by: The Gaudioso Twins
- Produced by: James Gaudioso; Anthony Gaudioso; Ante Novakovic; DJ Dodd; Shawnee Smith; Rob Simmons
- Starring: Shawnee Smith; Taryn Manning; Drew Moerlein; James Gaudioso; Montanna Gillis; Kresh Novakovic; Adam Shippey; Anthony Gaudioso; Bruce Dern; Tyrese Gibson
- Cinematography: John Schmidt
- Edited by: Pete Talamo
- Music by: Nima Fakhrara; Charlie Sun
- Production companies: Gaudioso Twins Films; Twelve 83 Entertainment; Jars Media Group; Novakovic Brothers Productions
- Distributed by: Vertical Entertainment
- Release date: April 26, 2024
- Running time: 105 minutes
- Country: United States
- Language: English
- Box office: $231,909

Bloodline Killer is a 2024 American slasher film directed by Ante Novakovic and written by Anthony and James Gaudioso. It stars Bruce Dern, Tyrese Gibson, Shawnee Smith and Taryn Manning.

Filming took place in December 2022 in Connecticut. It was released on April 26, 2024.

== Premise ==
Moira Cole's life was shattered by the slaying of her loved ones by her unhinged and fixated cousin, Lee Morris. She now lives a simple and quiet suburban life with her two grown sons who were also scarred by the tragedy. They are brutally reminded of the murders every October by the successful horror film series based on them.

== Cast ==
- Shawnee Smith as Moira Cole
- Taryn Manning as Sam Marrin
- Drew Moerlein as Michael Cole
- James Gaudioso as Connor Cole
- Montanna Gillis as Lisa
- Kresh Novakovic as Detective Fink
- Adam Shippey and Damian Maffei as Skulleton
- Anthony Gaudioso as Trusten James, a detective
- Bruce Dern as Dr. Lucien
- Tyrese Gibson as Detective Cyphers
- Sal Rendino as Dillon Cole
- Daniel Cosgrove as Sidney Stone, a lieutenant
- Jennifer King as Cindi Hogan, an officer
- David Gere as Lester

== Production ==
In December 2022, it was reported that Ante Novakovic signed on to direct the then titled film, The Skulleton, that was written by twins Anthony and James Gaudioso, who also produce and star in the film. Bruce Dern, Tyrese Gibson, Shawnee Smith and Taryn Manning were cast in lead roles.

Principal photography began in early December 2022 in West Hartford, Connecticut for two days. The city serves as the fictional Deep Ridge Falls for the film. Filming moved a few months later to Los Angeles to shoot interior scenes with Dern, Manning, and Smith, before moving back to Connecticut in July 2023 to conclude filming.

== Release ==
Bloodline Killer was released in select theaters and on VOD by Vertical Entertainment on April 26, 2024. It was released as a Tubi original on June 28, 2024.
