= The Ghost and the Whale =

The Ghost and The Whale
- Directed by: Anthony Gaudioso; James Gaudioso
- Written by: Anthony Gaudioso
- Story by: Anthony Gaudioso
- Produced by: Paula Benard; Anthony Gaudioso; James Gaudioso; Matt Russell
- Starring: Maurice Benard; Tippi Hedren
- Cinematography: Jayson Crothers
- Edited by: Neguine Sanani
- Music by: Evan Frankfort
- Distributed by: MarVista Entertainment
- Release date: June 1, 2017 (Los Angeles)
- Running time: 105 minutes
- Country: United States
- Language: English

The Ghost and the Whale is a 2017 American mystery thriller drama film directed by Anthony Gaudioso and James Gaudioso and starring Maurice Benard and Tippi Hedren.

== Cast ==
- Maurice Benard as Joseph Hawthorne
- Jonathan Pryce as Whale (voice)
- Ashlynn Yennie as Anne
- Monica Keena as Dr. Sweetie Jones
- Tippi Hedren as Tippi
- James Gaudioso as Ed Hale
- Anthony Gaudioso as Jack Lee
