= Ashlynn Yennie =

American actress (born 1985)

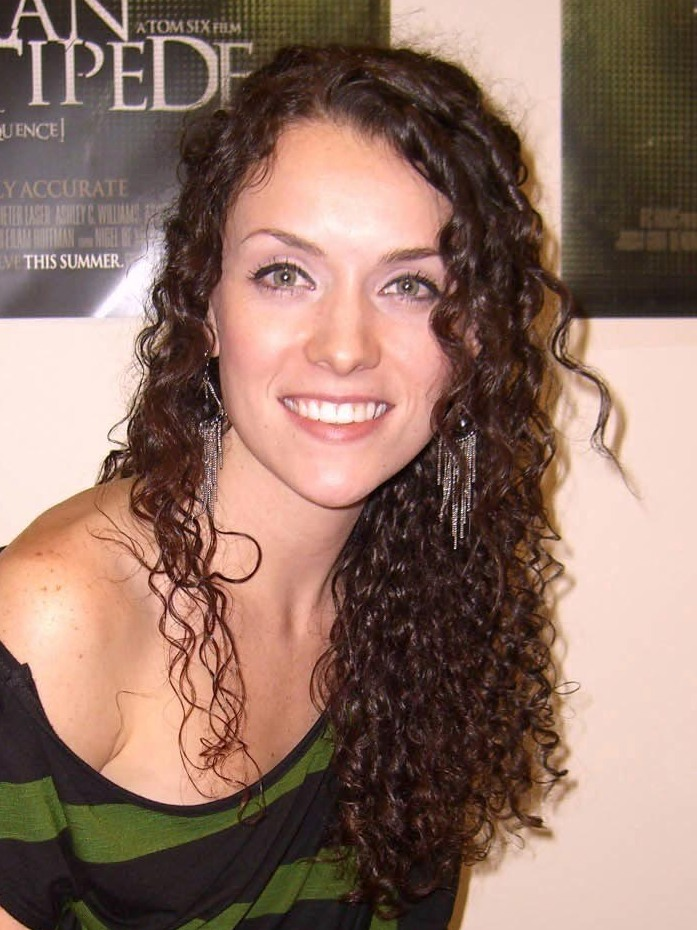
- Yennie in 2010
- Born: May 15, 1985 (age 41); Riverton, Wyoming, U.S.
- Occupations: Actress; producer
- Years active: 2008–present
- Spouse: Michael Mattera (2014-present)
- Children: 1

Ashlynn Yennie (born May 15, 1985) is an American actress from Riverton, Wyoming. She is best known for her role in the 2009 Dutch horror film The Human Centipede (First Sequence) and its 2011 sequel. In 2016, Yennie played Ashley in the Showtime TV mini-series Submission.

== Early life and education ==
Ashlynn Yennie was born on May 15, 1985 in Riverton, Wyoming, U.S as the youngest of four children to an account father and stay at home mother.

In 2004, Yennie studied at the New York Conservatory for Dramatic Arts.

== Career ==
Yennie first began working in school plays and local theater as a child and teenager before voicing Raven in the 2008 film, Absent Father. Her first major role in a feature film was as Jenny in the 2009 Dutch horror film, The Human Centipede (First Sequence). She appeared as a fictionalized version of herself in the sequel The Human Centipede 2 (Full Sequence).

In 2016, Yennie played the lead role of Ashley Pendleton in the Showtime erotic mini-series, Submission. She has appeared in several television shows including guest star roles on Undateable and NCIS. She has also appeared in supporting roles in films such as Fractured, The Scribbler, The Divorce Party, The Ghost and the Whale, and Fear, Inc. In 2021 she had the lead role in the horror film, Antidote.

== Personal Life ==
Yennie began dating Michael Mattera in 2009 before marrying in November 2026. The couple have one child, a daughter.

== Filmography ==
=== Film ===
Year	Title	Role	Notes
2008	Absent Father	Raven (voice)	
2009	The Human Centipede (First Sequence)	Jenny	
2011	The Human Centipede 2 (Full Sequence)	Miss Yennie	
2012	American Maniacs	Starlene Arbuckle	
2013	Fractured	Brandy	
2014	The Scribbler	Emily	
2014	The Divorce Party	Leena	
2015	The Human Centipede 3 (Final Sequence)	Jenny/Miss Yennie	Archival footage
2015	L.A. Slasher	Scream Queen	
2016	Fear, Inc.	Trisha Harrison	
2017	The Ghost and the Whale	Anne	
2017	The Wrong Neighbor	Jamie	TV movie
2019	The Wrong Mommy	Phoebe Sutton/Lisa Nolan	TV movie
2019	The Springfield Three	Suzanne	Short
2020	Faith Based	Ashlynn	
2020	Variant	Aria	
2021	Antidote	Sharyn	
2022	The Recipe	The Wife	Short

=== Television ===
Year	Title	Role	Notes
2014	Undateable	Jane	Episode: "Pilot"
2015	NCIS	Daughter	Episode: "Spinning Wheel"
2016	Submission	Ashley Pendleton	Main Cast

=== Documentary ===
Year	Title
2010	Chiller 13: The Decade's Scariest Movie Moments
