= Submission (TV series) =

American erotic thriller TV mini-series

- Submission promotional poster
- Genre: Erotic thriller: Drama
- Created by: Jacky St. James; Paul Fishbein
- Starring: Ashlynn Yennie; Justin Berti; Raylin Joy; Victoria Levine; Kevin Nelson; Nika Khitrova; Brent Harvey
- Country of origin: United States
- Original language: English
- No. of seasons: 1
- No. of episodes: 6

Production
- Producer: Saskia Slade
- Running time: 24–37 minutes

Original release
- Network: Showtime
- Release: May 12 – June 16, 2016

Submission is an American erotic thriller mini-series created by Jacky St. James and Paul Fishbein, starring Ashlynn Yennie, Justin Berti, Victoria Levine and Raylin Joy. The series premiered on Showtime on 12 May 2016.

== Synopsis ==
The series follows the journey of Ashley (Ashlynn Yennie) from being in an unhappy relationship to her exploration of BDSM when she stumbles upon an erotic novel.

== Cast ==
=== Main cast ===
- Ashlynn Yennie as Ashley Pendleton, a woman, recently out of a bad relationship, stumbles into the BDSM world after her interest is piqued by an erotic novel SLAVE by a mysterious novelist named Nolan Keats.
- Justin Berti as Elliott, a BDSM practitioner who works with Dylan and develops an interest in Ashley and eventually initiates her into BDSM practices.
- Victoria Levine as Jules, Ashley's friend who offers her a place to stay and has secrets of her own.
- Raylin Joy as Dylan Quinn, Jules' roommate who is into kinky sex and recruits girls for Elliott.
- Kevin Nelson as Raif, a coffee bar owner who has a mutual attraction to Ashley.
- Nika Khitrova as Scarlet, one of Jules' bosses who is, unbeknownst to her husband, having an affair with Jules. Later, Jules, Scarlet and Tomas enter into a faithful polygamous relationship.
- Brent Harvey as Tomas, Jules's boss and Scarlet's husband.

=== Recurring ===
- Richie Calhoun as Jonathan
- Sara Luvv as Maura
- Valerie Baber as Kimberly
- Boston Blake as Anthony
- Vicki Chase as Susannah
- Karla Kush as Chelsea, a member of the book club started by Dylan
- Spike Mayer as Vincent, Ashley's ex-boyfriend
- Melissa Schumacher as Tina

== Development ==
The series co-creator, Jacky St. James, mentioned that she was unhappy with the way BDSM was portrayed in Fifty Shades of Grey, which she considers "passed off an abusive relationship as an honest interpretation of the BDSM lifestyle". She hoped to create a more nuanced view of the BDSM world with the series. In an interview with GQ, she described the series as, "imperfect people in BDSM relationships." The lead actress Ashlynn Yennie also echoed the creator's sentiment saying, "Fifty Shades of Grey was not a correct portrayal of the type of sex that people practice. It made it seem like it was for people that were messed up or dark and it’s not at all." She hoped that the show "can shatter that glass ceiling of false belief and show the world what it truly means to trust, communicate, and finally feel free to talk about what you want and don’t want sexually in a consensual and healthy way."

The trailer for the series was released on 29 April 2016.

== Episodes ==
No.	Title	Directed by	Written by	Original release date	US viewers
1	"Slave"	Jacky St. James	Jacky St. James	May 12, 2016	55,000
Ashley (Ashlynn Yennie) is stuck in an unhappy relationship, but finally breaks up with her boyfriend. After the break-up, she moves in with her friend Jules (Victoria Levine). The next day while searching for the job she walks in on the cafetaria owner Raif (Kevin Nelson) and Dylan (Raylin Joy) having sex. She is embarrassed, but Raif ends up offering her a job as a barista. Later she finds out that Dylan is Jules' roommate. Ashley stumbles upon the erotic novel SLAVE by Nolan Keats and pleasures herself to it.
2	"Control"	Jacky St. James	Jacky St. James	May 19, 2016	106,000
Dylan catches Ashley reading the book and invites her to the book club to discuss the book. Although initially hesitant, Ashley agrees. Raif tells Ashley that he thinks Dylan is crazy and reveals that she had sex in the cafeteria bathroom a few days ago with a complete stranger (Sydney Black). In the bookclub, women discuss the book and talk about their fantasies. Later that night, Ashley sees Dylan taking Chelsea, one of the book club members, handcuffed and blindfolded in her car. She gets worried and calls Jules, but she doesn't pay attention. So she calls Raif at her home, Raif assures her that Chelsea will be fine and they end up having sex. Dylan takes Chelsea to a dungeon, ties her up naked and blindfolded, and introduces her to Elliott (Justin Berti).
3	"Smut"	Jacky St. James	Jacky St. James	May 26, 2016	119,000
Elliott engages in bondage with Chelsea, which she enjoys. Jules and Dylan tease Ashley about her encounter with Raif, while Ashley feels awkward about her relationship with Raif. Ashley also attempts to get her security deposit from her ex-boyfriend, Vincent (Spike Mayer). At Jules' 25th birthday party, it's revealed that Jules is not having an affair with her boss, Tomas (Brent Harvey), as everyone thinks, but her boss's wife, Scarlet (Nika Khitrova). Scarlet is smitten by Ashley's beauty and asks her if she'd be interested in posing nude for her. Dylan tries to recruit a woman for Elliott, but Elliott is interested in Ashley, to which Dylan says she's "off limits", but Elliott refuses to listen. Elliott, while talking to Ashley, claims that Nolan Keats is in fact his own pen name, but Ashley doesn't believe him. Elliott secretly steals Ashley's underwear and makes Hayley (Gia Ramey-Gay), who he picked up at the party, wear it while having sex with her. At the end of sex, he exclaims, "Thank you, Ashley", to Hayley's shock and dismay.
4	"Master"	Jacky St. James	Jacky St. James	June 2, 2016	98,000
Ashley receives a manuscript of Nolan Keats' next book, Owned in the mail and believes that Elliott is, in fact, Nolan Keats and thanks him for the book. Jules is shocked to hear that Tomas and Scarlet are renewing their vows and she angrily confronts Scarlet. Raif apologizes to Ashley about his drunken behaviour at the party and they agree to remain friends. Elliott asks Ashley if she'd be interested in a submissive experience with him, she agrees and as a part of the task, she agrees to go to work without wearing a bra. Meanwhile, to help Jules, Ashley agrees for a nude photoshoot with Scarlet so she can confront her about not leaving her husband, but Scarlet is ambivalent about leaving him because he has really helped her career. Dylan feels neglected from Elliott and tries to find ways to surprise him, only to get Elliott even more angry with her. Elliott finally invites Ashley to his house and they have sex.
5	"Safeword"	Jacky St. James	Jacky St. James	June 9, 2016	122,000
Elliott "punishes" Dylan for disregarding his wishes. Later Dylan inquires about Elliott's other escapades, Elliott reacts angrily to it and breaks off his arrangement with her, bringing her to tears. Elliott takes Ashley to his dungeon, establishes a safeword and introduces her to submissive sex. Jules confronts Scarlet about not leaving Tomas and after the discussion agrees to enter into a polyfidelituous relationship with Tomas and Scarlet, and they have threesome. After her initial nervousness and fear, Ashley decides that she wants to experience mummification. Dylan accidentally finds out about Elliott's letters to Ashley and is heartbroken. In her anger, she emails one of the old videos of a sex session of her and Elliott with another girl to blackmail him.
6	"Domination"	Jacky St. James	Jacky St. James	June 16, 2016	116,000
Elliott is disturbed when he receives threatening email from Dylan, who threatens that unless Elliott agrees to loan her to her, she'll expose him. Elliott tells Ashley that as a part of a submissive experience, she would be loaned to another dominant. Initially baffled, Ashley reluctantly agrees as a trust-building measure. During the submissive experience, Dylan puts her through pain, but she manages to complete it without using the safeword. Traumatised by the experience, she vows to Elliott that she'll never go through it again. Jules is not satisfied with her threesome and complains that threesomes are overrated. Raif disagrees and recounts his experience of a threesome with two older women, Melanie Masterson (Cherie DeVille) and Roberta Johnson (India Summer) and claims he satisfied both of them, however Ashley and Jules laugh him off. Jules realizes that she loves only Scarlet and cannot be in the relationship with both Scarlet and Tomas and breaks off the relationship. Dylan decides to move out of the house and while leaving she reveals to Ashley that Elliott is not Nolan Keats, just his copy editor; Ashley is heart-broken. She informs Elliott that revealing the secret was her ultimate act of domination. The series ends with an angry Ashley breaking up with Elliott, Jules now working for Raif in his cafe, and Dylan at the doorstep of the real Nolan Keats.

== Reception ==
=== Ratings ===
The series debuted with low viewership of 0.01 share and 55,000 viewers. However, the second episode almost doubled the viewers at 106,000 viewers and 0.02 share. The series continued its rating growth with 0.03 share and 119,000 viewers in the third week. The series finale accumulated the rating of 0.02 and 116,000 viewers.

=== Critical reception ===
Uproxx praised the series saying, "[Submission] is trying to change the way we look at late-night erotica". SheKnows also praised the show for its BDSM portrayal and said, "While Fifty Shades of Grey the movie failed to arouse interest for many, Submission is taking viewers deep into the world of BDSM — and it doesn't seem to be afraid to go there."
