= Erotas =

Greek television series

- Gregoris Valtinos and Vasia Panagopoulou (Season 2-3)
- Έρωτας
- Created by: Vana Dimitriou; Kostas Kostopoulos
- Starring: Koralia Karanti; Gregoris Valtinos; Stefanos Kiriakidis; Adamantia Kontogiorgi; Vasilis Galaios; Noni Ioannidou; Dimitri Liakopoulos
- Narrated by: Koralia Karanti (flashbacks)
- Opening theme: Pezi o Erotas by Giorgos Perris
- Ending theme: Pezi o Erotas (instrumental) by Giorgos Perris
- Country of origin: Greece
- No. of seasons: 3
- No. of episodes: 646 (list of episodes)

Production
- Executive producer: Ena Productions
- Production locations: Athens, Greece; Mykonos, Greece; Santorini, Greece; London, England; Paris, France; Rome, Italy; Agia Napa, Cyprus
- Running time: 42 min. approximately

Original release
- Network: ANT1
- Release: September 18, 2005 – May 30, 2008

Related
- Based on The Bold and the Beautiful

Erotas (Greek: Έρωτας; English translation: Love) is a Greek television soap opera, produced in 2005 by TV author Vana Dimitriou. The show aired on the ANT1 network from September 18, 2005, until May 30, 2008, in Greece and Australia. Kostas Kostopoulos, Katerina Kokkinidou, and Spyros Michalopoulos directed the show, that had three seasons and 646 episodes. Erotas aired in the time-slot previously claimed by the show Lampsi, which concluded in the summer of 2005, after 14 years of continuous screening.

The main storyline revolves around the private life of a wealthy Athenian family. The series follows Ektoras (Grigoris Valtinos) and Myrto Anagnostou (Koralia Karanti) five years into their seemingly blissful marriage and successful professional lives. As the story unfolds, secrets and jealousy cast a shadow over the couple's happiness. The story becomes more complicated when Myrto's ex-husband comes back into their lives.

The show was originally renewed for a fourth season, but on April 26, 2008, ANT1 decided not to proceed with airing it. The five final episodes of Erotas were the highest rating episodes in its history, with over 4,250,000 watching, on average, in Greece. The series also aired in Cyprus, Mexico, Germany, Australia, Canada, the United States, and the United Kingdom.

== Controversy ==
Uproar arose among fans in early 2007, during the storyline of Myrto's kidnapping, when the writers led the fans to believe she was dead. The writers admitted in early 2008 that they were unsure at the time whether or not the character would survive and "unintentionally" left viewers hanging in the balance while they made their decision. They eventually concluded that the character would have died had they not anticipated an adverse audience reaction. Koralia Karanti renewed her contract until the end of the series, on August 25, 2007, and remained on the show for the entire series, appearing in every episode.

== Ratings ==
Season	Timeslot (EDT)	Season premiere	Season finale	TV season	Rank	Viewers (in millions)
1	Monday-Friday 7.00 P.M.	September 18, 2005	July 21, 2006	2005–2006	#2	4.0
2	Monday-Friday 7.00 P.M.	September 17, 2006	July 13, 2007	2006–2007	#10	3.2
3	Monday-Friday 7.00 P.M.	September 3, 2007	May 30, 2008	2007–2008	#1	4.5

It was the highest rating television show in Greece after the cancellation of Vera Sto Dexi. Almost immediately after beginning, the show has proven quite popular, beating all other shows in its timeslot except Vera Sto Dexi, until its end in May 2007. The show suffered a significant drop in ratings of 15% after Noni Ioannidou's character Vera left the show in November 2006; the writers have now admitted that they regretting killing her character, as they knew Vera was one of the most popular characters, but did not predict this sharp decline in ratings, however by the end of the second season the ratings had significantly recovered. However, in 2008, the show was cancelled on the ANT1 network, due to low ratings, opposite Mega Channel's UGLY MARIA.

== Broadcast ==
Its popularity has been reflected by airing it internationally on the ANT1 Pacific network in Australia, where it has a huge fanbase, broadcast at 7pm, on the ANT1 network, in synchronization with Greece.

It is also seen in over 15 other countries, including across Canada via the Odyssey Network and the United States via ANT1 Satellite network. Replacing reruns of Lampsi and Kalimera Zoi, the show has attracted quite a lot of fans outside Greece as it is aired at the 7 p.m. timeslot (like in Greece).

== Criticism ==
Almost every cast member has been framed for a crime, and many have been sent to jail, which has sparked criticism against the show as the characters are setting a bad example for the community. Other criticisms of the show are that in the second season, many characters in Stefanos' family were killed. The list includes Vera, Olga, and his half-sister, sister and father.

Central character Aphrodite's husband was also killed along with Hector's secretary, along with various other minor characters that were killed only weeks after being introduced. The writers have promised to lower the amount of death on the show next season, as in only 2 seasons of the show over 15 characters have died, this is more than Lost in its first two seasons. Furthermore, at the start of the third season, many new characters were introduced and roles of current characters re-cast. Many fans feel that they are not watching the same show anymore, since hardly any original cast members remain after only two completed seasons.

Additionally, the fans were disappointed that the storyline involving Angelle's death was revealed by the actor before the end of the second season. This ultimately spoiled the cliffhanger.

== Setting ==
- Erotas is set in the Northern suburbs of Athens including Ekali.
- It is also set one east coast of Athens, including Sounio and also on the Greek island of Mykonos where Mirto and her family own two resorts named after their daughter, Antigoni.
- A third resort in Agia Napa, Cyprus, was burned to the ground after a suspicious fire at the end of the first season, the fire was most probably caused by Ioulia's associates.
- On July 13, 2007, Mirto opened another location of the Antigoni's Hotel corporation in Spetses at the end of the second season.
- During the third season Mirto also bought a fifth hotel in Santorini, with two weeks spent on location observing the area.

== Storyline guides ==
=== Season 1(2005–2006) ===
Erotas Season 1 premiered on September 8, 2005 and ended on June 24, 2006 with a total of 221 episodes. A successful heart surgeon and a dynamic business woman enjoy personal and family completion with their daughter. All seems wonderful in their life until the moment that the woman's ex-husband sets it as his objective to destroy her life.

=== Season 2 (2006–2007) ===
Erotas Season 2 premiered on September 17, 2006 and ended on July 13, 2007 with a total 230 episodes. At the start of the second season months have passed since the tragic explosion at Martha's farewell party and everybody struggles to move on.

=== Season 3 (2007–2008) ===
Erotas Season 3 premiered on September 3, 2007 and ended on May 30, 2008 with a total of 195 episodes. This season would have had 100 episodes, however this was extended to 195 episodes on October 10, 2007 due to outstanding ratings performance. This lead many to believe it would be the last season, since it was being given an increasingly extended run. These people were proven corrected, as the series was cancelled on May 26, 2008. The start of the third season begins where Season 2 left off. Everybody has boarded Myrto's cruise, and Angello is murdered. A wedding occurs, and some beloved faces from Mirto's past return.

=== Cancellation and future ===
On April 26, 2008, the series was officially cancelled. The producers stated, that this was always the plan, and talk of future seasons was a ploy to avoid determining the end point of the series to the audience. The final episode aired on May 30, 2008 in Greece. The producers say they wanted to end the series at the height of its popularity, and therefore decided to not renew for an additional season, however, it is becoming increasingly clear that this is untrue, and the real reason being a financial dispute. The creator of Erotas has said she would be more than willing to continue the show on another network, should any of the major networks express interest.

=== Syndication ===
The ANT1 network begin to run Erotas episodes in syndication in a late-night timeslot from the fall of 2008.

== Specials ==
Two specials have aired, recapping Season 1 on May 19, 2006, and Season 2 on June 20, 2007, with spoilers for next season, and the respective seasons' final episodes. A recap special highlighting future season 3 events/cast interviews, aired on September 2, 2007.

== Cast and characters ==
=== Main characters ===
Below is a list of all main characters, that have appeared in Erotas, in order of prominence.

- Koralia Karanti - Myrto Anagnostou
- Gregoris Valtinos - Ektoras Anagnostou
- Stefanos Kiriakidis - Stefanos Doukas
- Adamantia Kontogiorgi - Antigoni Douka (Season 1,2,3-4)
- Noni Ioannidou - Vera Douka (Season 1-2, 4)
- Dimitri Liakopoulos - Pavlos Doukas
- Victor Kolasis - Markos Anagnostou
- Yianni Spaliaras - Alexandros Mavrakis
- Patricia Peristeri- Christina Douka
- Maro Mavri - Nadia Douka (Season 2-4)
- Vasia Panagopoulou - Aphrodite Aperyi (Season 2, 4)
- Stella Antipa - Eleftheria (Season 2-3)
- Katerina Didaskalou - Ioulia Anagnostou (Season 1, 4)
- Melpo Kosti - Elena Hatziyianni (Season 3)
- Manos Papayiannis - Renos Doukas (Seasons 1-2)
- Georgia Apostolou - Martha Douka (Season 1, 4)
- Orestis Dourvas - Iasonas (Season 3)
- Alexandros Parthenis - Angelos Papadatos (Season 2)
- Natasha Tsakarisianou Τσακαρισιάνου - Basiliki (Season 1-2, 4)
- Καterina Savrani - Anna (Season 2)
- Anna Tsoukala - Fedra (Season 2)
- Manos Zaharakos - Konstantinos (Season 1-2, 4)
- Kostas Mesaris - Yerasimos Papadatos (Season 2)
- Katerina Mantziou - Tania (Season 2-3)
- Christos Vasilopoulos - Lefteris Argiriou (Seasons 1-2, 4)
- Augoustinos Remondos - Stelios (Season 2)
- Yiannis Aivazis - Manos (Season 2)
- George Dambasis - Aris (Season 2)
- Vaso Laskaraki - Ariadni (Season 2-3)
- Georgia Mavrogiorgi - Thalia (Season 2)
- Othonos Metaksas - Philipos (Season 2)
- Elena Keramida - Eva Anagnostou (Season 1-2)
- Deana Douvani - Eva Anagnostou (Season 2-3)
- Olympia Papagianni - Eva Anagnostou (Season 3)
- Vasilis Galeos - Andreas (Season 2-3)
- Katerina Panayaki - Eleni (Season 1-2, 4)
- Thodoris Thanos - Dimitrakis (Season 1-2)
- Panos Gogos - Dimitris (Season 1)
- Athina Zotou - Alexandra (Season 2)
- Giorgos Ninios - Thanasis Avgeris (Season 3)
- Mary Akrivopoulou - Athina Hatzigianni (Season 3)
- Yiannis Dritsas - Renos Doukas (Season 3-4)
- Orestis Dourvas - Iasonas (Season 3)
- Thomas Kindinis - Miltiadis Hatziyiannis (Season 3)
- Christos Yiannaris - Antonis Ikonomou (Season 3)
- Dimitris Nasioulas - Dimitris Hatzis (Season 3)

== DVD releases ==
A greatest hits DVD covering the most memorable moments from the first two seasons will be released before the beginning of the third season in Greece and Australia.

== Final season ==
The MEGA network has not confirmed when it will run the final season of Erotas.
