= List of Erotas episodes =

The following article contains a list of episodes of the television series Erotas on the ANT1 channel from 2005 to 2008. The episodes are grouped by week. 560 episodes have aired in Greece and Australia and 540 episodes have aired in Cyprus, United States, United Kingdom and Canada, to February 1, 2008. The show premiered on September 8, 2005, and is currently in its third season. The final episode was on 30 May 2008 and there will not be a fourth season.

== Episodes ==
=== Season 1 (2005–2006) ===
No.	Title	Original release date
1	"Pilot, Survive, New Beginning, A Horrible Memory, Just Can't Forget"	September 8, 2005
2	"Pilot, Survive, New Beginning, A Horrible Memory, Just Can't Forget"	September 2005
3	"Pilot, Survive, New Beginning, A Horrible Memory, Just Can't Forget"	September 2005
4	"Pilot, Survive, New Beginning, A Horrible Memory, Just Can't Forget"	September 2005
5	"Pilot, Survive, New Beginning, A Horrible Memory, Just Can't Forget"	September 11, 2005
The main characters are introduced, and Renos survives his crucial car accident.
6	"Trouble, Divorce?, This is Hell, Oh Boo Hoo, Reunite"	September 12, 2005
7	"Trouble, Divorce?, This is Hell, Oh Boo Hoo, Reunite"	September 13, 2005
8	"Trouble, Divorce?, This is Hell, Oh Boo Hoo, Reunite"	September 14, 2005
9	"Trouble, Divorce?, This is Hell, Oh Boo Hoo, Reunite"	September 15, 2005
10	"Trouble, Divorce?, This is Hell, Oh Boo Hoo, Reunite"	September 16, 2005
Myrtle and Hector suffer problems in their marriage.
11	"Manipulation, Seduction, Action, Diary, Consequences"	September 19, 2005
12	"Manipulation, Seduction, Action, Diary, Consequences"	September 20, 2005
13	"Manipulation, Seduction, Action, Diary, Consequences"	September 21, 2005
14	"Manipulation, Seduction, Action, Diary, Consequences"	September 22, 2005
15	"Manipulation, Seduction, Action, Diary, Consequences"	September 23, 2005
Ioulia tries to get Hector back in her life.
16	"The Real Truth Part 1, The Real Truth Part 2, The Real Truth Part 3, The Return of Antigoni, Welcome Back"	September 26, 2005
17	"The Real Truth Part 1, The Real Truth Part 2, The Real Truth Part 3, The Return of Antigoni, Welcome Back"	September 27, 2005
18	"The Real Truth Part 1, The Real Truth Part 2, The Real Truth Part 3, The Return of Antigoni, Welcome Back"	September 28, 2005
19	"The Real Truth Part 1, The Real Truth Part 2, The Real Truth Part 3, The Return of Antigoni, Welcome Back"	September 29, 2005
20	"The Real Truth Part 1, The Real Truth Part 2, The Real Truth Part 3, The Return of Antigoni, Welcome Back"	September 30, 2005
Stefanos and Vera have a massive fight. And flashbacks continue surrounding Myrtle's missing daughter Antigoni and she returns.

=== Season 3 (2007–2008) ===
No.	Title	Original release date
1	"A Beautiful Disaster, Cheaters and Liars, Unhappily Married, The True Love, Who's Back"	September 3, 2007
2	"A Beautiful Disaster, Cheaters and Liars, Unhappily Married, The True Love, Who's Back"	September 4, 2007
3	"A Beautiful Disaster, Cheaters and Liars, Unhappily Married, The True Love, Who's Back"	September 5, 2007
4	"A Beautiful Disaster, Cheaters and Liars, Unhappily Married, The True Love, Who's Back"	September 6, 2007
5	"A Beautiful Disaster, Cheaters and Liars, Unhappily Married, The True Love, Who's Back"	September 7, 2007
Angelle is murdered. Aphrodite leaves for London. Elena gets married, but is really still in love with her longtime ex-lover. And Renos returns.
6	"Renos' Secret, Tanya Turner, The Helpful Fight, The Happy Couple, The Naughty Escape"	September 10, 2007
7	"Renos' Secret, Tanya Turner, The Helpful Fight, The Happy Couple, The Naughty Escape"	September 11, 2007
8	"Renos' Secret, Tanya Turner, The Helpful Fight, The Happy Couple, The Naughty Escape"	September 12, 2007
9	"Renos' Secret, Tanya Turner, The Helpful Fight, The Happy Couple, The Naughty Escape"	September 13, 2007
10	"Renos' Secret, Tanya Turner, The Helpful Fight, The Happy Couple, The Naughty Escape"	September 14, 2007
Renos' and Nadia's involvement in the murder of Angelle is revealed through various flashbacks.
11	"Nadia's secret, Hector and Aphrodite Part 1, Hector and Aphrodite Part 2, Another Hotel, Santorini Days"	September 17, 2007
12	"Nadia's secret, Hector and Aphrodite Part 1, Hector and Aphrodite Part 2, Another Hotel, Santorini Days"	September 18, 2007
13	"Nadia's secret, Hector and Aphrodite Part 1, Hector and Aphrodite Part 2, Another Hotel, Santorini Days"	September 19, 2007
14	"Nadia's secret, Hector and Aphrodite Part 1, Hector and Aphrodite Part 2, Another Hotel, Santorini Days"	September 20, 2007
15	"Nadia's secret, Hector and Aphrodite Part 1, Hector and Aphrodite Part 2, Another Hotel, Santorini Days"	September 21, 2007
It is revealed that Hector and Aphrodite possibly conspired to kill Angelle. Mirto leaves to Santorini to buy another hotel.
16	"The Chess Player, Motherly Problems, The Accident, Yet Another Loss?, Suicidal Attempts"	September 24, 2007
17	"The Chess Player, Motherly Problems, The Accident, Yet Another Loss?, Suicidal Attempts"	September 25, 2007
18	"The Chess Player, Motherly Problems, The Accident, Yet Another Loss?, Suicidal Attempts"	September 26, 2007
19	"The Chess Player, Motherly Problems, The Accident, Yet Another Loss?, Suicidal Attempts"	September 27, 2007
20	"The Chess Player, Motherly Problems, The Accident, Yet Another Loss?, Suicidal Attempts"	September 28, 2007
Mirto and Petros start a chess game. Nadia's issues with her mother continue. Hector persuades Nadia to give him an alibi. Dimitris is involved in a car accident. And Elena attempts suicide.
21	"New Love, Back Home, Continuing Pain, You Have Hysteria, Waking Up"	October 1, 2007
22	"New Love, Back Home, Continuing Pain, You Have Hysteria, Waking Up"	October 2, 2007
23	"New Love, Back Home, Continuing Pain, You Have Hysteria, Waking Up"	October 3, 2007
24	"New Love, Back Home, Continuing Pain, You Have Hysteria, Waking Up"	October 4, 2007
25	"New Love, Back Home, Continuing Pain, You Have Hysteria, Waking Up"	October 5, 2007
Hector and Elena have obvious feelings for each other and so do Mirto and Petros. Athina still waits to hear from Dimitri, still unaware that he has been in a car accident. Elena is diagnosed with hysteria by Hector. Dimitri wakes up, and Athina finally finds out he was in a car accident.
26	"Come Back To Me, Flashing Back, Suicidal Deux, Nadia's Baby, The Evil Maid"	October 8, 2007
27	"Come Back To Me, Flashing Back, Suicidal Deux, Nadia's Baby, The Evil Maid"	October 9, 2007
28	"Come Back To Me, Flashing Back, Suicidal Deux, Nadia's Baby, The Evil Maid"	October 10, 2007
29	"Come Back To Me, Flashing Back, Suicidal Deux, Nadia's Baby, The Evil Maid"	October 11, 2007
30	"Come Back To Me, Flashing Back, Suicidal Deux, Nadia's Baby, The Evil Maid"	October 12, 2007
Elena begs Miltiadis to come back to her, and attempts suicide again. Athina's husband becomes very violent with her, forcing her to throw up. Mirto and Petros keep having flashbacks to their time in Santorini together. It is revealed that Nadia has a child when she was 16 years old and her mother knows where it is? Stedanos' maid is caught by him with a stranger in her house who is actually investigating the murder of Angelle.
31	"Bad Marriages, Taking Charge, Arianthi's Secret, Moving On, Political Plans"	October 15, 2007
32	"Bad Marriages, Taking Charge, Arianthi's Secret, Moving On, Political Plans"	October 16, 2007
33	"Bad Marriages, Taking Charge, Arianthi's Secret, Moving On, Political Plans"	October 17, 2007
34	"Bad Marriages, Taking Charge, Arianthi's Secret, Moving On, Political Plans"	October 18, 2007
35	"Bad Marriages, Taking Charge, Arianthi's Secret, Moving On, Political Plans"	October 19, 2007
Elena and her husband have marital problems, with him constantly pressuring her to have sex. Elena moves on from her second suicide attempt by giving away all of her old clothes to charity and adopting an all new look. Arianthi has a secret blonde friend who is paying the rent for her, she took the photos for Stefanos and Elena's husband who plan to use them to overthrow the current political power and place Miltiadis in power. However, while Miltiadis is in power to control him. Mirto and Elena take up yoga classes, and Eloena begins daily exercise.
36	"Shot, Secret Hospital Visits, Arianthi Spilt It, I Can Feel My Arms, Cooking Disasters"	October 22, 2007
37	"Shot, Secret Hospital Visits, Arianthi Spilt It, I Can Feel My Arms, Cooking Disasters"	October 23, 2007
38	"Shot, Secret Hospital Visits, Arianthi Spilt It, I Can Feel My Arms, Cooking Disasters"	October 24, 2007
39	"Shot, Secret Hospital Visits, Arianthi Spilt It, I Can Feel My Arms, Cooking Disasters"	October 25, 2007
40	"Shot, Secret Hospital Visits, Arianthi Spilt It, I Can Feel My Arms, Cooking Disasters"	October 26, 2007
Pavlos is shot on a date with Arianthi. He then goes to see Hector to sneak him into the hospital under a false name so Christina doesn't find out what has happened and about the date. It is found that his arm may be permanently paralysed after surgery. Only Mirto is allowed into the room to see him to reduce press attention. Eventually, they tell Christina he was involved in a car accident. However, Arainthi has told the truth to the police, and she also says she thinks Pavlos killed Angelle, and says that Renos killed Ari. She gets the DVD for the police and begins to work with Petros against Renos and co. Mirtoe tries to cook for Pavlos because he gets better quickly and is coming home, she fails at many things and tries to get help from Christina who knows even less about cooking than she does.
41	"That DVD, And Then We Kiss, Tania's Paranoia, Well I'm Surprised, No More Baby"	October 29, 2007
42	"That DVD, And Then We Kiss, Tania's Paranoia, Well I'm Surprised, No More Baby"	October 30, 2007
43	"That DVD, And Then We Kiss, Tania's Paranoia, Well I'm Surprised, No More Baby"	October 31, 2007
44	"That DVD, And Then We Kiss, Tania's Paranoia, Well I'm Surprised, No More Baby"	November 1, 2007
45	"That DVD, And Then We Kiss, Tania's Paranoia, Well I'm Surprised, No More Baby"	November 2, 2007
Petros shows the DVD to his boss, and he issues a warrant for Renos' arrest. Mirto and Petros share a passionate kiss. Tania stops being paranoid about finding the charm with an A on it and gets back together again with Alexandros. Mirto and Petro stop after their kiss thinking that what they are doing is wrong. Stefanos finds out about Hector and Elena. Athina loses the baby after her husband beats her.
46	"No More Baby, Running Away, Beautiful Sex, Still In Hiding, 500th episode special"	November 5, 2007
47	"No More Baby, Running Away, Beautiful Sex, Still In Hiding, 500th episode special"	November 6, 2007
48	"No More Baby, Running Away, Beautiful Sex, Still In Hiding, 500th episode special"	November 7, 2007
49	"No More Baby, Running Away, Beautiful Sex, Still In Hiding, 500th episode special"	November 8, 2007
50	"No More Baby, Running Away, Beautiful Sex, Still In Hiding, 500th episode special"	November 9, 2007
Athina loses the baby and goes into hiding with Dimitris. Leading her husband to desperately search for her and have Dimitris followed. Renos is arrested and Mirto collapses, Nadia is sent into a spiral of guilt over everything, as she knowns the truth.
51	"So Your Not Answering Your Phone?, The Truth Behind it All, Running Out of Funds, Nadia Moves Out, A Painful Phonecall"	November 12, 2007
52	"So Your Not Answering Your Phone?, The Truth Behind it All, Running Out of Funds, Nadia Moves Out, A Painful Phonecall"	November 13, 2007
53	"So Your Not Answering Your Phone?, The Truth Behind it All, Running Out of Funds, Nadia Moves Out, A Painful Phonecall"	November 14, 2007
54	"So Your Not Answering Your Phone?, The Truth Behind it All, Running Out of Funds, Nadia Moves Out, A Painful Phonecall"	November 15, 2007
55	"So Your Not Answering Your Phone?, The Truth Behind it All, Running Out of Funds, Nadia Moves Out, A Painful Phonecall"	November 16, 2007
Miltiadis works with Antonis to starve Elena and Athina of funds in order to make Athina move back in with him. Nadia tells Stefanos the truth about Spetses, she was with Renos. Stefanos throws her out, and Mirtoe comes to her rescue giving her a room in Sounio to stay in. Antigoni re-establishes contact, as she is worried about Renos. She calls Stefanos who explicitly tells her to not come home and cause more grief.
56	"When Things Run Dry Part One, When Things Run Dry Part Two, Third Time Around, Loulou, Nafsika's Torture"	November 19, 2007
57	"When Things Run Dry Part One, When Things Run Dry Part Two, Third Time Around, Loulou, Nafsika's Torture"	November 20, 2007
58	"When Things Run Dry Part One, When Things Run Dry Part Two, Third Time Around, Loulou, Nafsika's Torture"	November 21, 2007
59	"When Things Run Dry Part One, When Things Run Dry Part Two, Third Time Around, Loulou, Nafsika's Torture"	November 22, 2007
60	"When Things Run Dry Part One, When Things Run Dry Part Two, Third Time Around, Loulou, Nafsika's Torture"	November 23, 2007
The funds run dry for Athina and Elena, Elena pawns her engagement ring for 4000 euros in a desperate attempt to reclaim her ID card, which she traded for car petrol. Athina's lover, Dimitris is informed that he will soon be fired. Both women however are resilient to the tragic circumstances they face and are not willing to succumb so easily. Antigoni calls Mirtoe and tells her she is coming home because she is worried about Reno, but tells Mirto at the same time that she is the worst mother in the world. Pavlos catches Arianthi with Petros, the DVD is found but not by him, they manage to fool him with an excuse and Mirtoe doesn't believe Pavlos.
61	TBA	November 26, 2007
62	TBA	November 27, 2007
63	TBA	November 28, 2007
64	TBA	November 29, 2007
65	TBA	November 30, 2007
TBA
66	TBA	December 26, 2007
67	TBA	December 27, 2007
68	TBA	December 28, 2007
69	TBA	December 29, 2007
70	TBA	December 30, 2007
TBA
