= Paul, Apostle of Christ =

2018 American film written and directed by Andrew Hyatt

- Theatrical release poster
- Directed by: Andrew Hyatt
- Screenplay by: Andrew Hyatt
- Story by: Andrew Hyatt; T.J. Berden
- Produced by: David Zelon; T.J. Berden
- Starring: Jim Caviezel; Olivier Martinez; James Faulkner; Joanne Whalley; John Lynch
- Cinematography: Geraldo Madrazo
- Edited by: Scott Richter
- Music by: Jan A.P. Kaczmarek
- Production companies: Affirm Films; ODB Films; Giving Films; Mandalay Pictures
- Distributed by: Sony Pictures Releasing
- Release date: March 23, 2018
- Running time: 106 minutes
- Country: United States
- Language: English
- Budget: $5 million
- Box office: $25.5 million

Paul, Apostle of Christ is a 2018 American biblical drama film written and directed by Andrew Hyatt. It stars James Faulkner as Paul the Apostle and Jim Caviezel (who portrayed Jesus in the 2004 film The Passion of the Christ) as Luke.

The film tells the story of Paul, who was known as a ruthless persecutor of Christians prior to his conversion to Christianity. The plot focuses on his becoming a pivotal figure in the formation of the early church before being executed by Emperor Nero in Rome.

Principal photography began in September 2017 in Malta. The film was released on March 23, 2018 by Sony Pictures.

== Plot ==
Paul has been imprisoned inside Mamertine Prison in Rome for his strong influence as a Christian leader which makes him a threat to Nero's power. Mauritius Gallus, the newly appointed prefect of the prison, accuses Paul of burning half of Rome down and, by Nero's decree, sentences him to death. After meeting with Aquila and Priscilla, Luke sneaks into the prison and joyfully greets a weary, physically beaten Paul. Both men agree that Paul's time on Earth is nearing an end and so Luke convinces him to help write an account of how Paul, formerly known as Saul of Tarsus, came to be one of Christianity's greatest leaders. Although Mauritius discovers that Luke sneaked into the prison aided by high-ranking Romans, he allows him to visit Paul unscathed.

Paul narrates his origins. As Saul of Tarsus, a Jewish boy, he was influenced by the zealotry of his leaders and witnessed the martyrdom of Stephen at their hands for professing faith in Jesus Christ. This event made Saul vow to destroy all Christians throughout the world until the day he rode for Damascus with his brethren. He became blinded by God and heard His voice asking why Saul persecuted Him. This event along with Saul's meeting Ananias, a disciple of Christ, humbled Saul so deeply that he repented of his actions. Ananias restored Saul's sight and baptized him in the name of the Lord, which led to Saul rejecting his former name and becoming Paul.

The Christian community continues to suffer losses, and Cassius, who lost a cousin to the persecution, adamantly calls for Christians to seek revenge against the Romans. Although Luke rebukes Cassius by saying that Paul never sought revenge or wished ill upon those who harmed him, Luke begins to sympathize with the need for retribution after witnessing the Romans' cruelty and barbarity. However, Paul admonishes him for "giving up on the world when Christ did not" and tells him that the very love which Christ died for is the only way to counter this evil. Inspired by those words, Luke receives Paul's promise that he will have the grace and strength to endure.

Mauritius laments being made prefect of the prison despite his many deeds for Rome and the fact that his daughter is dying from a terrible sickness even with all his sacrifices to the Roman gods. Having heard of Paul's reputation as a preacher and miracle worker, he speaks with Paul and relays his concerns about his sickly daughter. Paul suggests that Luke be allowed to examine her and help, but Mauritius refuses to allow a Christian in his home against the protests of his wife who grows impatient with Mauritius' hubris. Further, Mauritius has Luke imprisoned believing that he and Paul are plotting an escape from the prison to lead an uprising against Rome despite Paul's assurances to the contrary.

Having lost all patience with Priscilla and Aquila's pacifism, Cassius takes matters into his hands by bringing an armed group of men to storm the prison and free Paul. However, Paul rejects their rescue attempt by saying that Christ has already won the victory upon the cross. Dejected, Cassius and the others escape before more guards arrive and disappear into the night. Mauritius angrily accuses Paul and Luke of the conspiracy to escape despite their protests and has Luke imprisoned with other Christians. After being sentenced to Nero's circus to be devoured by wild beasts, Luke leads the other prisoners in prayer asking the Lord to forgive their captors for their impending execution.

Fearing the loss of his daughter, Mauritius finally relents and has Luke brought to his house to save her. Luke sends Mauritius to Aquila and Priscilla for supplies needed to heal the child. Amazed that Luke would entrust the lives of other Christians to him, Mauritius goes alone to their hiding place and begs for their assistance. Although initially wary of a Roman prefect asking for help, they ultimately give Mauritius the requested supplies. With the items delivered, Luke uses his healing skills as a physician to cure the prefect's daughter of her illness while the imprisoned Christians are thrown into the circus.

With his daughter finally healthy again, Mauritius graciously spares Luke's life and thanks Paul for his continued kindness and compassion. Although Mauritius regrets the deaths of the Christians in the arena, Paul is hopeful that Mauritius may yet come to know Jesus Christ. Paul and Luke express their belief that all the world shall know the Christians by their love and that they will meet again. Aquila and Priscilla, having decided at last to leave Rome with their community, agree to deliver Luke's completed writings to Timothy and thus ensure that the Acts of the Apostles will be told and retold across the world.

Luke remains in Rome to continue evangelizing in the name of Christianity. As the Christians escape into the countryside, Paul is escorted outside the prison to be executed by decapitation with Luke watching it unfold. Mauritius shakes Paul's hand in a final gesture of goodwill and respect. As Paul's execution is underway, he narrates to Timothy saying that he is thankful to have fought the good fight, finished the race, and kept the faith. The final scene depicts Paul arriving in Heaven as a crowd of people greet him joyfully, including all of whom he once persecuted and killed. He is last seen walking towards Jesus filled with peace.

== Cast ==
- James Faulkner as Paul
  - Yorgos Karamihos as Saul of Tarsus, i.e., Paul before his conversion experience
- Jim Caviezel as Luke
- Olivier Martinez as Mauritius Gallus, prefect of Mamertine Prison
- Antonia Campbell-Hughes as Irenica, wife of Mauritius
- Joanne Whalley as Priscilla, companion of Paul and Aquila’s wife
- John Lynch as Aquila, companion of Paul and Priscilla's husband
- Noah Huntley as Publius
- Alessandro Sperduti as Cassius

== Themes ==
In an interview with Variety, Berden said that one of the main themes of the film is forgiveness: "Paul changed from murdering Christians to becoming one of their most influential leaders. His life personifies 'forgiveness,' a concept that seems almost impossible today — but desperately needed."

== Production ==
=== Development ===
Producer T.J. Berden, recognizing the emergence of new platforms for movie distribution which allows the viewer access anytime, anywhere, partnered with Hyatt to produce a series of film projects to capitalize on the new technologies. The first film resulting from the collaboration was Full of Grace, released in 2016. Paul, Apostle of Christ is the second film of the series.

=== Casting ===
Jim Caviezel was cast as Luke. It is his first biblical role since he portrayed Jesus in The Passion of the Christ in 2004. Caviezel's performance in the blockbuster film was met with critical acclaim. In an interview, Caviezel said that Mel Gibson told him that the role would ruin his career; and he "has no regrets about playing the most iconic role of all time". Caviezel explains how he prepared for the role of Luke:

I read the Acts of the Apostles and started lifting little clues here and there, and I went to Mass and prayed on them. And then we see how he wrote, how Paul sees [Luke], and I started cross-examining him — and there is a lot of cross-examining and asking him about it — and slowly it starts to all come together.

James Faulkner, who portrays Paul, starred as Randyll Tarly in HBO's Game of Thrones and Pope Sixtus IV in BBC's Da Vinci's Demons. Faulkner also had a small role in another film about St. Paul, the 1981 TV movie Peter and Paul, starring Anthony Hopkins as Paul. Faulkner's most famous role may be another historical and Biblical character of the first century, Herod Agrippa, in the 1976 miniseries I, Claudius. Joanne Whalley, in the role of Priscilla, had biblical roles previously as Pilate's wife Claudia in A.D. The Bible Continues (2015) and Noah's wife Emmie in The Ark (2015). Priscilla's husband, Aquila is played by John Lynch, known for The Secret Garden, as well as roles from the Bible as Sagan in The Passion (2008), Gabriel in The Nativity (2010) and Nicodemus in Killing Jesus (2015).

=== Filming ===
According to Yorgos Karamihos, the director and producers urged the actors to be "as authentic and visceral as possible in order to be real" rather than take into consideration sensibilities of various religious groups.

The filming was done on location on Malta. St. Paul's Island in Malta is known as the location where Paul and Luke were shipwrecked on their way to Rome. Many of the crew who worked on the film were culled from HBO's Game of Thrones, another production filmed in Malta. Karamihos said they were "some of the best people [in the local film industry]." Karamihos found Malta to be "one of the strangest places I've ever seen in my life – it is so built up for such a small place." He described it as "a strange combination of Africa, Asia, and Europe, bringing together all three continents both in the language and the culture and aesthetic."

== Release ==
Paul, Apostle of Christ was originally scheduled to be released on the Wednesday before Easter, March 28, 2018, by Affirm Films. However, in February 2018, the film's release date was moved up to March 23, 2018. The film was released on DVD, Blu-ray, and digital platforms on June 12, 2018.

== Reception ==
=== Box office ===
Paul, Apostle of Christ grossed $17.6 million in the United States and Canada, and $5.4 million in other territories, for a worldwide total of $23 million, against a production budget of $5 million.

In the United States and Canada, the film released alongside Pacific Rim Uprising, Midnight Sun, Unsane and Sherlock Gnomes, was projected to gross $2–7 million from 1,473 theaters in its opening weekend. It ended up debuting to $5.2 million, finishing 8th at the box office.

=== Critical response ===
The film has received mixed to negative reviews. On Rotten Tomatoes, the film holds an approval rating of 47% based on 38 reviews, and an average rating of 5.6/10. The website's critical consensus reads, "Paul, Apostle of Christ proves a well-intentioned yet disappointingly diffuse interpretation of a Bible story whose flashes of potential never come close to living up to the source material." On Metacritic, the film has a weighted average score of 52 out of 100 based on 11 critic reviews, indicating "mixed or average reviews". Audiences polled by CinemaScore gave the film an average grade of "A−" on an A+ to F scale.

Richard Roeper of the Chicago Sun-Times gave the film 3 out of 4 stars: "It's an impressively-staged, well-acted, thoughtful and faithful telling of the last days of the Apostle Paul — and how Luke risked his life again and again to visit his great mentor in prison and make a written record of Paul's life experiences and teachings."

Ann Hornaday of The Washington Post gave the film 3 out of 4 stars, applauded Faulkner's and Caviezel's performances, and called the film a "relevant — and inspiring — portrayal of principled steadfastness and spiritual integrity in the face of a petty, corrupt and tyrannical leader."

Todd McCarthy of The Hollywood Reporter wrote the film was "missing passion" and wrote: "The life of the crucial evangelist Paul has everything needed for a powerful film, but the filmmakers picked the wrong part of his life to dramatize in Paul, Apostle of Christ, a soupy, conjectural take on how the widely-traveled proselytizer came to produce his account of spreading Jesus' word throughout the Mediterranean world."

Steven Greydanus rated the film as the 3 out 4 stars on artistic and entertainment value in decentfilms.com for a review that originally appeared in the National Catholic Register. He describes the film as "not the unmade epic about the life of Paul of Tarsus many would like to see, but ... worthwhile in its own right."

== Accolades ==
Award	Date of ceremony	Category	Recipients	Result
GMA Dove Awards	October 17, 2018	Inspirational Film of the Year	Paul, Apostle of Christ	Nominated
27th Annual Movieguide Awards	February 8, 2019	Best Movie For Families	Paul, Apostle of Christ	Nominated
27th Annual Movieguide Awards	February 8, 2019	Epiphany Prize for Most Inspiring Movie	Paul, Apostle of Christ	Nominated
27th Annual Movieguide Awards	February 8, 2019	Grace Award for Movies	Jim Caviezel and James Faulkner, for their roles in Paul, Apostle of Christ	Won
Plugged In Movie Awards 2019	February 22, 2019	Best Christian Movie	Paul, Apostle of Christ	Won
