= Mary Akrivopoulou =

Greek actress

Mary Akrivopoulou (born 1975 in Thessaloniki) is a Greek actress. She is best known for her roles on Ton Ilio Tou Aiyaiou and Erotas. During the September 2007 parliamentary elections, she was a candidate MP of PASOK party for the region of Thessaloniki.
