= Vasia Panagopoulou =

Greek theatre and stage actress (born 1966)

Vasia Panagopoulou (Greek: Βάσια Παναγοπούλου; born 6 October 1966, in Mytilene) is a Greek theatre and stage actress who starred in Erotas.
