= Maurice Benard =

American actor

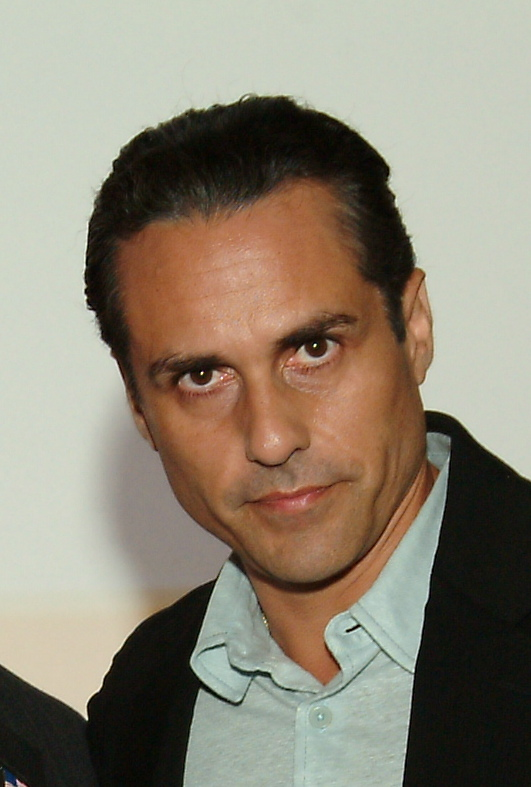
- Benard in 2005
- Born: Mauricio José Morales; March 1, 1963 (age 63); Martinez, California, U.S.
- Other name: Maurice Bénard
- Occupation: Actor
- Years active: 1987–present
- Spouse: Paula Smith (m. 1990)
- Children: 4
- Relatives: Marvin Benard (cousin)
- Website: mauricebenard.tv

Maurice Benard (born Mauricio José Morales; March 1, 1963) is an American actor. He played Nico Kelly in the ABC daytime soap opera All My Children from 1987 to 1990 and in 1991 portrayed Desi Arnaz in the biographical television film Lucy & Desi: Before the Laughter. In 1993, Benard began starring as Sonny Corinthos in the ABC soap opera General Hospital. For his role in General Hospital, Benard received three Daytime Emmy Award for Outstanding Lead Actor in a Drama Series.

== Early life ==
Benard was born Mauricio José Morales in Martinez, California, the son of Martha, a bank employee, and Humberto Morales, a bakery superintendent. He grew up in San Francisco, California, and is of Nicaraguan and Salvadoran ancestry.

== Career ==
In 1980s, he began career as a model before acting. In 1987, Benard made his television debut playing Nico Kelly in the ABC daytime soap opera All My Children, a role he played until 1990. He received Soap Opera Digest Award nomination for Outstanding Male Newcomer: Daytime in 1989. He later made guest appearances in prime time shows include DEA, Stat and Dark Justice. In 1991, Benard appeared in a supporting role in the made-for-television movie Her Wicked Ways and later that year played Desi Arnaz in the biographical television film Lucy & Desi: Before the Laughter opposite Frances Fisher. The following year he made his big screen debut appearing in the biographical drama film, Ruby and later had secondary role in the 1993 independent film Mi Vida Loca.

In 1993, Benard was cast as Sonny Corinthos, a manic depressive mobster kingpin in the ABC daytime soap opera, General Hospital. His first air date on GH was August 13, 1993. Initially, the character was only supposed to last for six months as Benard was not interested in anything more than a year. He revealed that after his stint on All My Children, he was not interested in doing another soap. He joined the cast of General Hospital because he had gone broke and acting was all he knew at the time. The producers offered him two separate roles, that of mobster Damian Smith, with a two-year contract, and that of Sonny. Benard revealed that just two weeks after starting work, he suffered a manic depressive breakdown. At one point he had stopped coming in to work but expressed his gratitude to the network for keeping faith in him instead of firing him immediately. He reprised his role in the 1996 prime time special General Hospital: Twist of Fate, daytime spin-off Port Charles in 2000, and in an episode of prime time spin-off General Hospital: Night Shift in 2007.

Benard has been nominated for ten Daytime Emmy Awards for his role of Sonny Corinthos, winning for Outstanding Lead Actor in a Drama Series in 2003, 2019, and 2021, as well as winning three Soap Opera Digest Awards for Outstanding Lead Actor in 1996, 2003, and 2005.

In addition for his daytime television career, Benard also starred in a number of feature and made-for-television movies. He appeared in the 2015 comedy-drama film Joy directed by David O. Russell. He starred in the 2017 independent mystery thriller film The Ghost and the Whale, executive produced by his wife Paula. He guest-starred on ABC crime series Castle in 2016 and appeared opposite Jamie Luner in the Lifetime thriller A Lover Betrayed (2017). In 2018, Benard appeared in the horror anthology film, Nightmare Cinema starring in segment directed by Ryuhei Kitamura. In 2019, he played John Gotti in the Lifetime crime film Victoria Gotti: My Father's Daughter. He later starred in films Hold On (2019), and Equal Standard (2020).

== Personal life ==
Benard married Paula Smith on August 11, 1990. They have four children: three daughters and one son. He and his wife adopted his wife's younger sister Heather, after their mother's death.

His cousin, Marvin Benard, played professional baseball.

Benard was diagnosed with bipolar disorder at age 22. He has become a spokesperson for treatment of the disorder with Mental Health America. He made the decision to have the General Hospital writers make his character, Sonny Corinthos, also have the disorder. Many of the struggles he faces on the show due to the disorder are ones he faced in his own life. Much praise has been given to the show for the realistic depiction.

== Filmography ==
=== Film ===
Year	Title	Role	Notes
1991	Her Wicked Ways	Steve	Television film
1991	Lucy & Desi: Before the Laughter	Desi Arnaz	Television film
1992	Ruby	Diego	
1993	Mi Vida Loca	Creeper	
1996	To Face Her Past	Jesse Molina	Television film
1999	Operation Splitsville	Frank	
1999	Restraining Order	Sicko	
2000	Crystal Clear	Steven	Short film
2000	We Married Margo	Himself	
2009	Confession	Mitch	
2015	The Ghost and the Whale	Joseph Hawthorne	
2015	Joy	Jared	
2017	A Lover Betrayed	Detective Alvarez	Television film
2018	Nightmare Cinema	Father Benedict	
2019	Victoria Gotti: My Father's Daughter	John Gotti	Television film
2019	Hold On	Peter Duran	
2019	Duke	Winky	
2020	Equal Standard	Captain Chavat Issak	
2022	Passions	Father Thomas Rourke	Short film

=== Television ===
Year	Title	Role	Notes
1987–1989	All My Children	Nico Kelly	Series regular
1990	DEA	Curro	Episode: "Bloodsport"
1991	Stat	Jorge Rosario	Episode: "Ladyfinger"
1992	Dark Justice	Kelly's Mob Boyfriend	Episode: "Anniversary"
1993–present	General Hospital	Sonny Corinthos	Series regular
1996	General Hospital: Twist of Fate	Sonny Corinthos	Television special
2000	Port Charles	Sonny Corinthos	3 episodes
2007	General Hospital: Night Shift	Sonny Corinthos	Episode: "Time Served"
2016	Castle	Horatio Spate	Episode: "Dead Again"

== Awards and nominations ==
List of acting awards and nominations
Year	Title	Award	Category	Result
1996	General Hospital	Daytime Emmy Award	Outstanding Lead Actor in a Drama Series	Nominated
1996	General Hospital	Soap Opera Digest Award	Outstanding Lead Actor	Won
1997	General Hospital	Daytime Emmy Award	Outstanding Supporting Actor in a Drama Series	Nominated
2003	General Hospital	Daytime Emmy Award	Outstanding Lead Actor in a Drama Series	Won
2003	General Hospital	Soap Opera Digest Award	Outstanding Lead Actor	Won
2004	General Hospital	Daytime Emmy Award	Outstanding Lead Actor in a Drama Series	Nominated
2005	General Hospital	Soap Opera Digest Award	Outstanding Lead Actor	Won
2006	General Hospital	Daytime Emmy Award	Outstanding Lead Actor in a Drama Series	Nominated
2011	General Hospital	Daytime Emmy Award	Outstanding Lead Actor in a Drama Series	Nominated
2019	General Hospital	Daytime Emmy Award	Outstanding Lead Actor in a Drama Series	Won
2021	General Hospital	Daytime Emmy Award	Outstanding Lead Actor in a Drama Series	Won
2023	General Hospital	Daytime Emmy Award	Outstanding Lead Actor in a Drama Series	Nominated
2024	CineHealth	Lifetime Achievement	Lifetime Achievement	Won
