= Christos Vasilopoulos =

Greek actor

Christos Vasilopoulos (Greek: Χρήστος Βασιλόπουλος; born 16 April 1978) is a Greek theatre, television and film actor. He is best known for portraying Lefteri on Erotas. He appeared as Olek in the first season of the Cinemax series Banshee.

== Personal life ==
Vasilopoulos married Antonia Ventouras on 2 July 2011. The wedding was held in Fiscardo, on the Island of Kefalonia, Greece.

The marriage ended in 2012 and their divorce was officially filed in 2014.

== Filmography ==
Year	Title	Format	Role
1999	Diakritiki goiteia ton arsenikon, I	-	-
2003	Hartino karavi	-	-
2005	Erotas	TV series	-
2005	Omiros	-	-
2006	Istories tou astynomou Beka, Oi	TV series	Christos Alexandris
2007	Alithinoi erotes	TV series	-
2007	Deligianneion Parthenagogeion	TV series	Rodolfos Pagourelis
2008	Matomena homata	TV series	Stratis Xenos
2008	Lola	TV series	Grigoris Exarhos
2010	Love at First Sight?	TV short	Chris
2011	A Quick Stop	TV short	The Cop
2011	Fresh Pursuit	-	David Komb
2011	The Closer	TV series	David Komb
2011	Traci Lords: Last Drag	TV short	-
2012	Hollywood Dream	-	Alexandros
2012	Paramithiasmenes	TV series	Alexandros
2012	Pleasure or Pain	-	Jack
2012	The Survival Game	Video	Hector
2013-2014	Banshee	TV series	Olek
2015	Metal Gear Solid V: The Phantom Pain	video game	Dr. Evangelos Constantinou
2015	Pocket Listing	Film	Victor
2015	Blindspot	TV series	Misha
2015	Caged No More	-	-
2016	Guys Reading Poems	-	The Director
2016	Days of Our Lives	TV series	Young Victor Kiriakis
2017	Camp Cool Kids	-	Instructor Mark
2017	The Last Ship	TV series	Stavros Diomedes
2018	Assassin's Creed Odyssey	video game	Greek Civilian (voice)
2019	Whiskey Cavalier	-	Marco
2020	Warrior	TV series	Smits
2021	Antidote	Film	Rizzo
2022	The Enforcer	Film	Silvio
