= Vaso Laskaraki =

Greek actress

- Βάσω Λασκαράκη
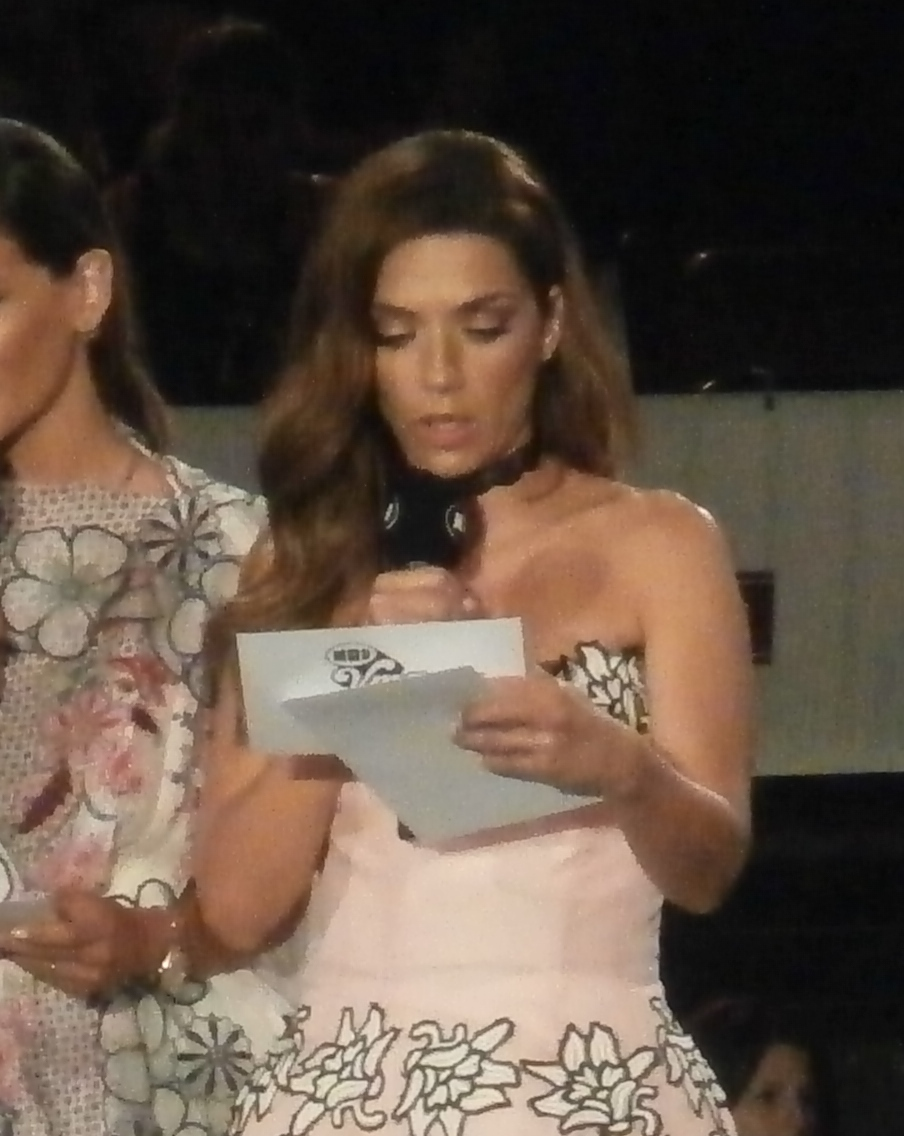
- Vaso Laskaraki in 2017
- Born: Vasiliki Laskaraki; October 19, 1979 (age 46); Thessaloniki, Greece
- Occupation: Actress
- Years active: 2005–present
- Height: 1.65 m (5 ft 5 in)
- Spouses: Giannis Tsimitselis (m. 2013; div. 2017) Lefteris Soultatos (m. 2019)
- Children: Eva Tsimitseli

Vaso (Vasiliki) Laskaraki (Greek: Βάσω (Βασιλική) Λασκαράκη; born 19 October 1979) is a Greek actress and tv hostess. After she finished her acting studies, she started working as an actress on theatre while some years after she made her first television appearances on greek soap operas as Ambitions and Love. She rosed to fame with the role of Loukia Asimaki on MEGA comedy The Block of Flats on 2008. She is also known for the lead role of Lydia Chambea on ALPHA comedy Your Family (2014-2019, 2025–present).

== Early life ==
She was born and raised in Thessaloniki, Greece to Anastasia Laskaraki (née Vamvakidou) and Christos Laskarakis. After school, she studied acting at National Theatre of Northern Greece's drama school.

== Filmography ==
=== Television ===
Year	Title	Role	Notes
2005-2006	Ambitions	Pepi	Main role, 190 episodes
2006-2008	Love	Ariadne Lambrou	Main role, 300 episodes
2007	Traces	Angeliki Fillipou	Episode: "The shop window girl"
2008-2011	The Block of Flats	Loukia Asimaki	Lead role, 130 episodes
2011-2014	Stolen Dreams	Fay Savvidi	Lead role, 317 episodes
2014-2019	Your Family	Lydia Chambea	Lead role, 307 episodes
2019-2020	Love After	Anna Makridi	Lead role, 97 episodes
2021-2022	In Foreign Hands	Tonia Mavromati	Lead role, 157 episodes
2022-2023	Mary Mary Mary	Mary B	Lead role, 43 episodes (5 unaired)
2023-2024	The Break with Vaso Laskaraki	Herself (host)	Sunday talk show on Skai TV; 17 episodes
2024	2023 Cyprus Eating Awards	Herself (co-host)	SIGMA TV special
2025–present	Your Family	Lydia Chambea	Lead role

=== Film ===
Year	Title	Role	Notes	Ref.
2014	Thursday the 12th	waitress	Film debut	

== Theatrography ==
Year	Title	Role	Theatre
2008-2009	H Pentamorfi kai to Teras	Princess Bell	Vorra Theatre
2009-2010	To Anthos tou Kaktou	Tonia	Lambeti Theatre
2010	O Filos mou Lefterakis	Dolly	Victoria Theatre
2011-2012	Sesouar gia dolofonous	Sophie	Apothiki Theatre
2012-2013	Val' Ton Ypourgo Stin Priza	Izabella	Peiraeus 131 Theatre
2014-2015	Prin To Harama	Vaso	Vembo Theatre

== Personal life ==
Laskaraki began dating Greek actor Giannis Tsimitselis in 2009, after meeting on the set of TV series I Polykatoikia. They married on October 24, 2013, in Athens and on November 10, 2013, she gave birth to their daughter, Evangelia "Eva" Tsimitseli. On September 28, 2017, Laskaraki and Tsimitselis announced their divorce with their lawyer's statement on media. On April 24, 2019, Laskaraki married Greek chef Lefteris Soultatos in Crete, Greece.
