= Georgia Apostolou =

Greek actress and fashion model

- Γεωργία Αποστόλου
- Born: 5 January 1973; Athens, Greece
- Died: 12 June 2016 (aged 43); Athens, Greece
- Occupation: Actress
- Years active: 1995–2005

Georgia Apostolou (Greek: Γεωργία Αποστόλου; 5 January 1973 – 12 June 2016) was a Greek actress and fashion model. She was best known for starring in popular TV series such as Fili zois, Aliki (TV series)|Aliki, Pes to psemata and Erotas. She died on 12 June 2016 at the age of 43.

== Selected filmography ==
=== Cinema ===
- Zoe (1995)

=== Television ===
- Anatomia enos egklimatos (1995)
- To monopati tis agapis (1995)
- Vammenos ilios (1996)
- Karambola (1997)
- Trikymia (1999)
- Pes to psemata (2000)
- Aliki (2001)
- Fili zois (2002–2004)
- Erotas (2005)
