= Noni Ioannidou =

Greek theatre and stage actress and model

- Born: Noni Ioannidou; 15 April 1958 (age 68)
- Occupation: Actress
- Years active: 1985–present

Noni Ioannidou (Greek: Νόνη Ιωαννίδου) (born 15 April 1958) is a Greek theatre and stage actress and model. She is best known for Antigoni in the 1992 television series Vammena kokkina mallia, as Aggela Solomou on 17 episodes of Me thea sto pelago and for playing Vera Douka on the first two seasons of Erotas. From 1999 to 2003 she had one of the leading roles in the daily ET1 series In the Wings of Love. In the 2003–2004 season she played the role of Angela Solomou in the mystery series With a Goddess in the Sky. This was followed by the role of Amalia Angelidou in the 14th season of ANT1's daily series The Shining. From 2005 to 2007 she starred in the daily series Erotas, playing Vera Doukas.

== Career ==
=== Film ===
Year	Film	Role	Notes
1985	Tatouage me velones		
1986	Morfi kai periehomeno		
1986	Dynastia ala ellinika		(Video)
1987	Monaxia	Girl	
1988	To magiko gyali	Nikoleta	
1989	Love Me Not?	Sleeping girl	
1992	Meine Tochter gehört mir	Aliki	
2000	Fovou tous Ellines	Maria	

=== Television ===
Year	Programme or series	Role	Notes	1989	Sto camping
1991	I lampsi				
1992	Vammena kokkina mallia	Antigoni	18 episodes		
1993	Guilty Relationships				
1995	Stras				
1995	To geloion tou pragmatos		Episode: "Skylisies aretes, anthropina vitsia"		
1997	To timhma tou pathous	Christina	20 episodes		
1999	Sta ftera tou erota				
2000	Toutes les femmes sont des déesses	Eleni			
2004	Me thea sto pelago	Aggela Solomou	17 episodes		
2005–2006	Erotas	Vera Douka			
2008–2009	O pseftis pappous		4 episodes		
