= Manos Papayiannis =

Greek actor and model

Manos Papayiannis (Greek: Μάνος Παπαγιάννης; born December 15, 1977) is a Greek, former male fashion model, theatre, stage, television and movie actor.

== Appearances ==
He has appeared on many Greek television series in leading roles. He is best known for his roles in Erotas, Aliki, Oso Iparhi Agapi, Lampsi, and Mi Mou Les Antio. Manos has appeared with co-star Georgia Apostolou in several different TV series. His on screen brother, appeared with him in Mi Mou Les Antio.
