= Grigoris Valtinos =

Greek television and stage actor

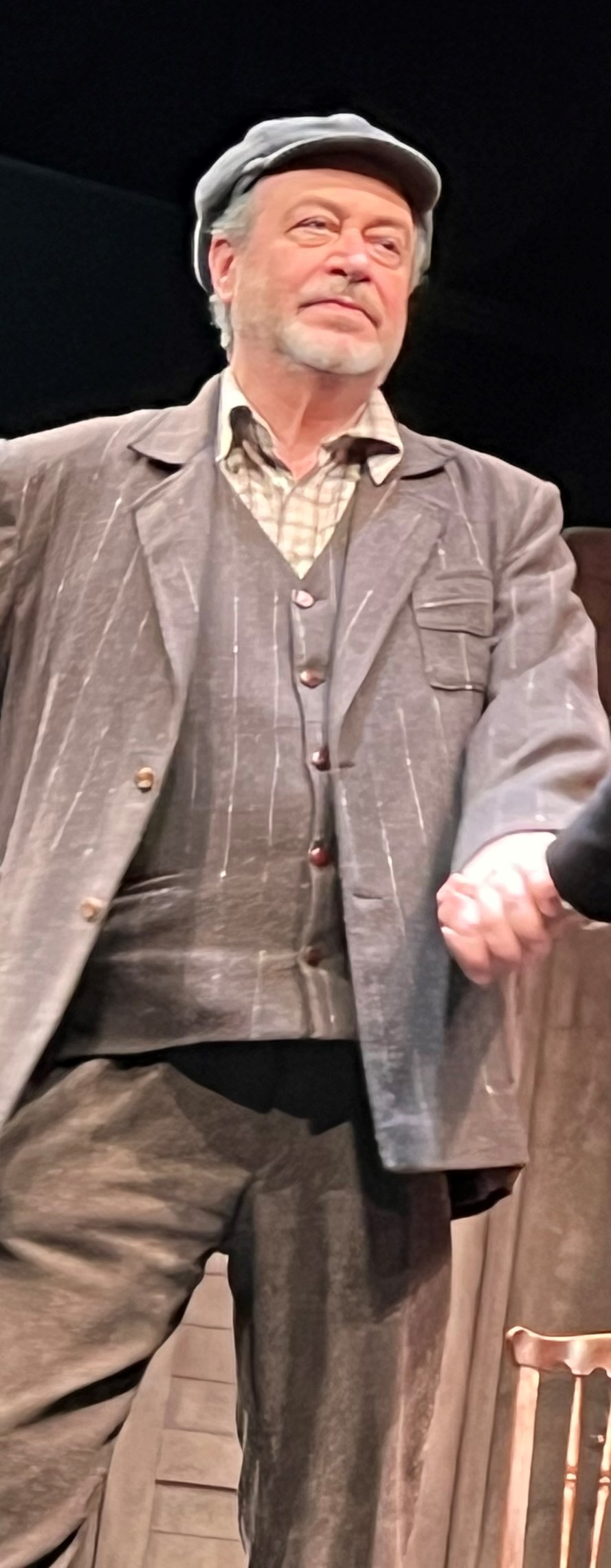
- Grigoris Valtinos in 2023
- Born: August 7, 1955 (age 69); Thessaloniki, Greece
- Occupation(s): Actor, stage director

Grigoris Valtinos (Greek: Γρηγόρης Βαλτινός; born August 7, 1955) is a Greek television and stage actor.

He is perhaps best known for playing Hector Anagnostou on Erotas, a role he has played since 2005.

== Selected filmography ==
- Ta Paidia tis Niovis (2004) (TV Series) as Mihalakis Anastasiadis (Sarris)
- Megalos thimos, O (1998) (TV Series) as Asimakis
- Dipli alithia (1996) (TV Series)
- Prova nifikou (1995) (TV Series) as Petros Manias
- Anatomia enos eglimatos (1992) (TV Series) as Narrator
- Fakelos Amazon (1991) (TV Series)
- Treis harites, Oi (1990) as Yannis Alexiou
- Thanatos tou Timotheou Konsta, O (1986) (TV Series)
- Dikigoroi, Oi (1982) (TV Series)
- Astrofeggia (1980) (TV Series)
- Eleftherios Venizelos: 1910-1927 (1980)
