= Koralia Karanti =

Greek actress

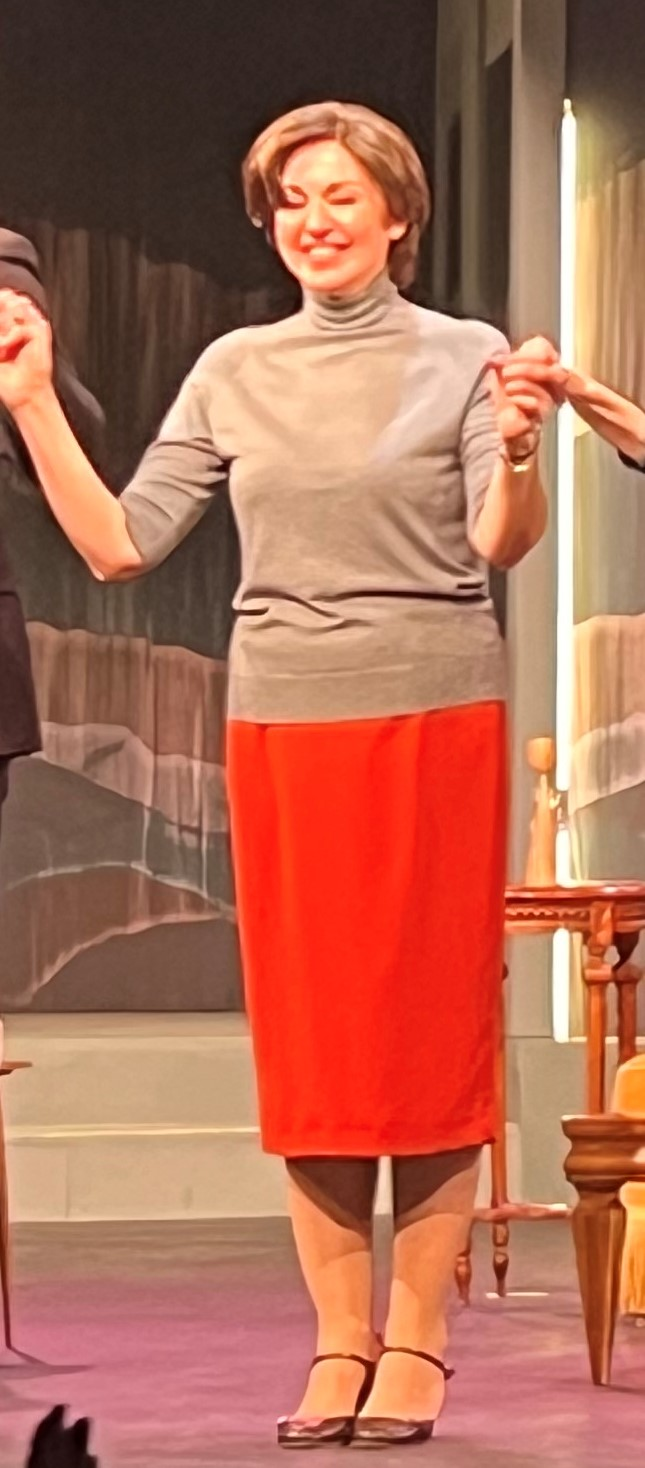
- Born: Koralia Karanti; 1 October 1959 (age 66); Athens, Attica, Greece
- Years active: 1981–present
- Spouse(s): Johnny Kalimeris (1991–1998); George Liani (2003–2013)

Koralia Karanti (born 1 October 1959) is a Greek actress of theatre and television.

== Personal life ==
She is currently married to Giorgos Lianis, a journalist and minister of socialist government, she has a son with her ex-husband Johnny Kalimeris. She is the daughter of actress Afroditi Grigoriadou.

== Filmography ==
- "Erotas" (2005–2008; 2010–present) (TV Series)
- "Venteta" (1999) TV Series as Hara
- "Kokkino feggari, To" (1994) TV Series
- "Africa" (1992) TV Series
- "Dipsa, I" (1990) TV Series
- "Lampsi ton Astron" (1983) TV Series
- "Fos tou Aygerinou" (1982) TV Series
- Kerithres (1981) (Greece: recut version)
