= Benoît Lestang =

French special effects designer, makeup artist (1964–2008)

Benoît Jean Lucien Lestang
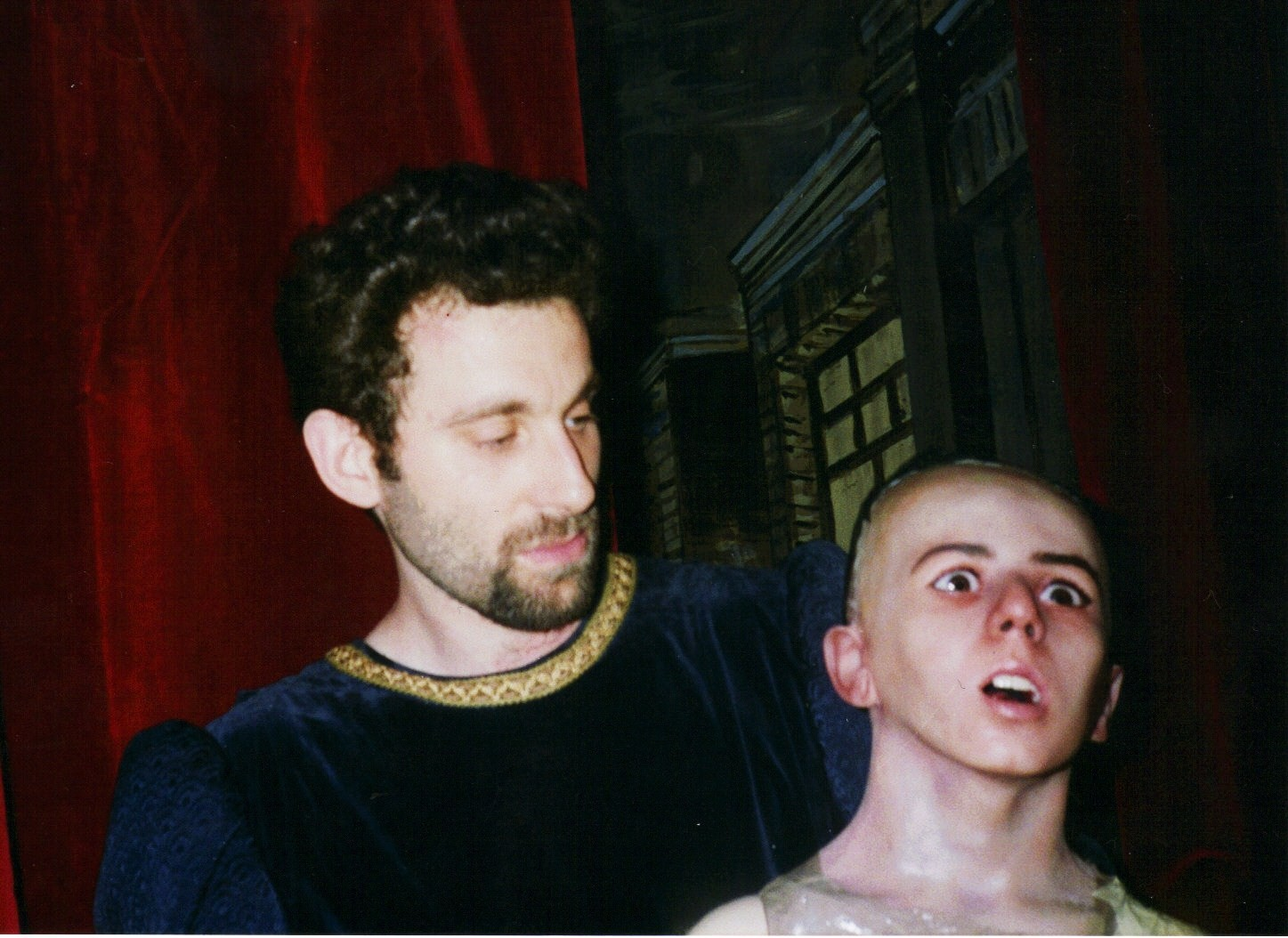
- Lestang in 1996
- Born: Benoît Jean Lucien Lestang; December 14, 1964; Bale, Switzerland
- Died: 27 July 2008 (aged 43); Paris, France
- Occupation: Special effects artist

Benoît Lestang (14 December 1964 – 27 July 2008) (Note: Sources on Lestang's birthdate vary; the Internet Movie Database has listed a birthdate of 14 December 1964, but a memorial biography of Lestang published by Mylène Farmer on her official site indicates Lestang was actually born on 14 July 1964. An obituary for Lestang states he died at age 43, suggesting his birthday was earlier than 27 July.) was a French special effects designer and makeup artist who worked on a number of French films.

== Biography ==
Lestang began working as a collaborator on the French fantasy film magazine Starfix in the 1980s. Lestang worked as an effects artist on the American horror film Brain Damage (1988).

He also worked as a special effects makeup artist on numerous French films, including Baby Blood (1990), Sade (2000), Brotherhood of the Wolf (2001), and The Diving Bell and the Butterfly (2007). Lestang worked as an effects artist on two films by Pascal Laugier: Saint Ange (2004) and Martyrs (2008), as well as on Olivier Assayas's Sentimental Destinies (2000) and Demonlover (2003). In 2005, Lestang directed the music video for Mylène Farmer's song "Q.I.".

Lestang died by suicide in Paris on 27 July 2008, shortly before the release of Martyrs.

== Select filmography ==
Year	Title	Role	Ref.
1982	The Living Dead Girl	Special effects	
1983	Ogroff	Special effects	
1987	Revenge of the Living Dead Girls	Special effects	
1988	Brain Damage	Special effects	
1990	Baby Blood	Makeup artist	
1992	Bitter Moon	Special effects	
1995	The City of Lost Children	Makeup artist	
1996	Mr. Stitch	Special makeup effects	
1997	Wax Mask	Special effects artist	
1997	On Guard	Makeup artist	
1998	Alissa	Special effects makeup artist	
1998	Pleasure (And Its Little Inconveniences)	Special effects makeup artist	
2000	Sentimental Destinies	Special effects makeup artist	
2000	Sade	Special effets makeup artist	
2000	Murderous Maids	Special effects makeup artist	
2001	Brotherhood of the Wolf	Special effects makeup artist	
2002	Safe Conduct	Special effects makeup artist	
2002	Amen.	Special effects makeup artist	
2002	Demonlover	Special effects makeup artist	
2003	The Story of Marie and Julien	Special effects makeup artist	
2004	Saint Ange	Makeup effects	
2004	The Light	Special effects makeup artist	
2004	Kings and Queen	Special effects makeup artist	
2004	36 Quai des Orfèvres	Special effects makeup artist	
2005	Manderlay	Special effects makeup artist	
2005	The Ring Finger	Special effects makeup artist	
2006	Days of Glory	Special effects makeup artist	
2006	Tell No One	Special effects makeup artist	
2007	Molière	Special effects makeup artist	
2007	The Diving Bell and the Butterfly	Special effects makeup artist	
2007	A Secret	Special effects makeup artist	
2007	Intimate Enemies	Special effects makeup artist	
2008	Martyrs	Special effects makeup artist	
2009	Inspector Bellamy	Special effects makeup artist	
