= 2010 Fangoria Chainsaw Awards =

Annual US horror film awards ceremony

17th Fangoria Chainsaw Awards
- Presented by: Fangoria
- Presented on: 2010
- Site: Los Angeles, California

Highlights
- Most awards: Drag Me to Hell (3)
- Most nominations: Martyrs (5)

The 2010 Fangoria Chainsaw Awards, presented by Fangoria magazine and Creation Entertainment, honored the best horror films of 2009.

== Winners and nominees ==
Best Wide Release	Best Limited Release
Drag Me to Hell − Directed by Sam Raimi; Paranormal Activity − Directed by Oren Peli; The Last House on the Left − Directed by Dennis Iliadis; The Road − Directed by John Hillcoat; Zombieland − Directed by Ruben Fleischer	Trick 'r Treat − Directed by Michael Dougherty; Deadgirl − Directed by Marcel Sarmiento and Gadi Harel; Martyrs − Directed by Pascal Laugier; Rec − Directed by Jaume Balagueró and Paco Plaza; The Burrowers − Directed by J. T. Petty; The Children − Directed by Tom Shankland
Best Actor	Best Actress
Jesse Eisenberg − Zombieland as Columbus; Garret Dillahunt − The Last House on the Left as Krug Stillo; Song Kang-ho − Thirst as Fr. Sang-hyun; Stephen McHattie − Pontypool as Grant Mazzy; Viggo Mortensen − The Road as Man	Morjana Alaoui − Martyrs as Anna Assaoui; Emmanuelle Béart − Vinyan as Jeanne Bellmer; Jordan Ladd − Grace as Madeline Matheson; Manuela Velasco − Rec as Ángela Vidal; Virginia Madsen − The Haunting in Connecticut as Sara Campbell
Best Supporting Actor	Best Supporting Actress
Dylan Baker − Trick 'r Treat as Steven; Frank Langella − The Box as Arlington Steward; French Stewart − Surveillance as Officer Jim Conrad; Kodi Smit-McPhee − The Road as Boy; Noah Segan − Deadgirl as J.T.; Tom Noonan − The House of the Devil as Mr. Ulman	Lorna Raver − Drag Me to Hell as Mrs. Sylvia Ganush; Isabelle Fuhrman − Orphan as Esther; Kim Ok-vin − Thirst as Tae-ju; Mylène Jampanoï − Martyrs as Lucie Jurin; Ryan Simpkins − Surveillance as Stephanie
Best Screenplay	Best Score
Martyrs − Pascal Laugier; Deadgirl − Trent Haaga; From Within − Brad Keene; Surveillance − Jennifer Lynch and Kent Harper; The Burrowers − J. T. Petty; The Children − Tom Shankland and Paul Andrew Williams	Drag Me to Hell − Christopher Young; Grace − Austin Wintory; The Box − Win Butler, Régine Chassagne and Owen Pallett; The Burrowers − Joseph LoDuca; The House of the Devil − Jeff Grace
Best Make-Up/Creature FX	Worst Film
Splinter − Justin Raleigh and Ozzy Alvarez; Deadgirl − James Ojala; End of the Line − Adrien Morot; Martyrs − Benoît Lestang; The Burrowers − Robert Hall; The Haunting in Connecticut − Todd Masters	Friday the 13th − Directed by Marcus Nispel; Halloween II − Directed by Rob Zombie; Paranormal Activity − Directed by Oren Peli; The Box − Directed by Richard Kelly; The Final Destination − Directed by David R. Ellis; The Twilight Saga: New Moon − Directed by Chris Weitz

== Fangoria Horror Hall of Fame ==
- Tom Atkins
- Tobin Bell
