= Seppuku Paradigm =

French electronica/film music/rock duo

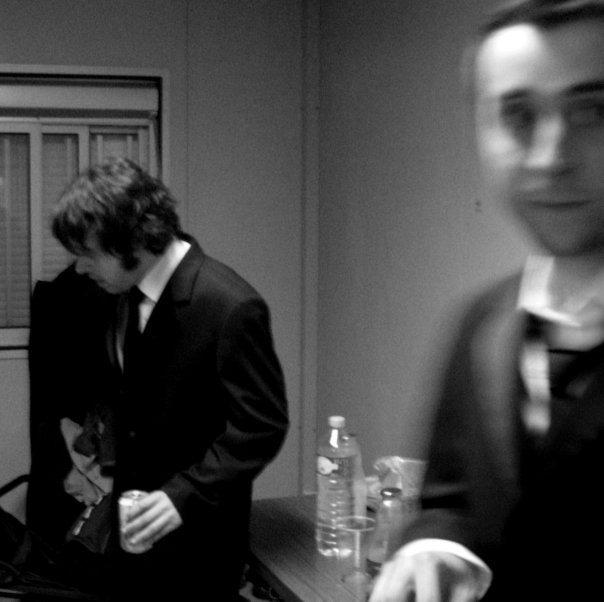
- Left to right : Willie Cortés, Alex Cortés

Background information
- Origin: Paris, France
- Genres: film music
- Years active: 2005-present
- Members: Willie Cortés, Alex Cortés

Seppuku Paradigm is a French electronica/film music/rock duo. They are currently based in Paris, France.

Their name was inspired by the self given death of Japanese author Yukio Mishima who, after a failed coup d'état, committed suicide according to ancient Japanese tradition (seppuku or hara kiri) as a gesture of public protest.

Composed of brothers Cortes namely Alex (guitar/programming) and Willie (vocals/drums/bass/programming), Seppuku Paradigm was formed in 2005.

Before forming the group Willie had released a debut solo album in 2004 on a major label (Willie Cortez: Farsuct'/Delabel/EMI). Alex, who is a former member of French collective Downliners Sekt' (The Pledge EP /B:Cuts) also appeared live and in studio alongside Willie for the FARSUCT project (live performances included festivals "Printemps de Bourges", "Transmusicales" and opening act for Buck 65 at "Elysée Montmartre" in Paris).

In 2007 the duo independently released their first effort Unedited/Unreviewed EP).

The same year the band wrote/produced three exclusive songs for Julien Séri's film Scorpion.

Their first full original soundtrack was for Franck Vestiel's first film Eden Log, featuring singer Melissa Mars (released in French theaters on Dec 26 2007; bought for the US by Magnet).

In 2008 they composed the score to Pascal Laugier’s very controversial second film Martyrs (out in France September 2008/bought for US release by the Weinstein Company).

Their latest work to date is the original soundtrack for Red Nights by Julien Carbon and Laurent Courtiaud for which they won the 'Best Original Soundtrack' award at the Sitges Film Festival in 2010.

== Discography ==
Seppuku Paradigm - Unedited/Unreviewed EP (2007/Label: Farsuct Global Communication/Dist: Wild Palms Music)

== Filmography ==
- Additional music (3 songs) for Scorpion (2007/Dir: Julien Séri/Prod: Imperia Films/Dist: Bac Films/Country:France)
- Full original soundtrack for Eden Log (2007/Dir: Franck Vestiel/ Prod: Imperia Films/Dist: Bac Films]/Country:France)
- Full original soundtrack for Martyrs (2008/Dir: Pascal Laugier/ Prod: Eskwad]/Dist: Wild Bunch]/Country:France/Canada)
- Full original soundtrack for Red Nights (2009/Dir: Julien Carbon and Laurent Courtiaud/Prod:Red East Pictures/Dist:Film Distribution/Country:Hong Kong/France)

Short films

- Full original soundtrack for the fan film Welcome to Hoxford (2011/Dir: Julien Mokrani & Samuel Bodin /Prod:Six Pieds Sur Terre /Country:France)
- Full original soundtrack for On the Other Side‘’ (2010/Dir: Robin Veret/Prod: Rez Creative Labs/Country:Canada)

== Awards ==
- 2010 - Best Original Soundtrack for 'RED NIGHTS'- Sitges International Fantastic Film Festival.

== Other ==
Music for the trailer of the game Far Cry 2 released by Ubisoft (MONTREAL - CANADA).(2008)
