= Catherine Bégin =

Canadian actress

- Bégin in 1985
- Born: 22 April 1939; Bois-Colombes, France
- Died: 29 December 2013 (aged 74); Montreal, Quebec, Canada
- Education: Montreal Conservatory of Dramatic Art
- Occupation: Actress
- Notable work: Délivrez-nous du mal; Les Beaux Dimanches; Martyrs; Laurence Anyways
- Television: Septième nord; Le Paradis terrestre; Grand-Papa; Caroline; Des dames de cœur
- Relatives: Monique Bégin (sister)

Catherine Bégin (22 April 1939 – 29 December 2013) was a Canadian actress.

== Biography ==
Catherine Bégin's parents were Quebec sound engineer Lucien Bégin (1895–1964) and Belgian accountant Marie-Louise Vanhavre (or Van Havre) (1906–1967), who married in 1935. Catherine was born in Bois-Colombes, France in 1939. They were in Paris when World War II was declared and fled to Périgueux, then Lisbon, arriving in Montreal in August 1941.

Bégin graduated from the Montreal Conservatory of Dramatic Art in 1959.

She portrayed more than a hundred roles on the stage, frequently including the classical (Euripides, Corneille, Racine, Molière, Musset, Marivaux, Beaumarchais, Chekhov), contemporary (Cocteau, Arrabal, Bernhardt), and Québécoise repertoires (Marcel Dubé, Réjean Ducharme, Jovette Marchessault, Michel Garneau, Évelyne de la Chenelière). Her interpretations of Madame Rosa (La vie devant soi), Hécube (Les Troyennes), and La Mé (Jouliks) won her a Masque for Best Female Performance in a Supporting Role.

She has been seen in about 30 Société Radio-Canada teleplays and in about 20 téléromans, including Septième nord, Sympohrien, Grand-Papa, Le parc des braves, Des dames de cœur, Un signe de feu, and Virginie.

In the cinema, Bégin acted under the direction of Jean-Claude Lord (Délivrez-nous du mal, Panique), Denys Arcand (Stardom), Bernard Émond (Contre toute espérance), Ghyslaine Côté (Le Secret de ma mère) and Denis Côté (Elle veut le chaos). She embodied the disturbing character of Mademoiselle in Pascal Laugier's genre film Martyrs. One of her last performances in the cinema was Mamy Rose, under the direction of Xavier Dolan in Laurence Anyways.

As a theater instructor at Collège Lionel-Groulx for over 20 years, she helped train a generation of young actors.

Involved in the cause of a better recognition of the importance of the arts, and the improvement of the status of artists and creators in Quebec, Bégin acted as spokesperson for the World Coalition of Arts and Cultural Affairs (1986–1990). In particular, she participated in the works of the boards of directors of the Union des artistes (1976–1980) and the Association des directeurs de théâtre (1980–1984). She chaired the Quebec Council of Theatre (1986–1990) and the Académie québécoise du théâtre (1999–2003).

Bégin passed away in Montreal in 2013. Her archival fonds (P964) are housed in the Bibliothèque et Archives nationales du Québec.

== Performances ==
=== Theatre ===
- 1959 – Cinna (Pierre Corneille)
- 1961 – La soif d'aimer (Éloi de Grandmont)
- 1963 – Britannicus (Jean Racine)
- 1963 – Patate (Marcel Achard)
- 1964 – Guillaume le confident (Gabriel Arout et Jean Loche)
- 1965–66 – Horace (Pierre Corneille)
- 1966 – Une folie (Sacha Guitry)
- 1967 – Le Système Ribadier (Georges Feydeau)
- 1967–68 – Le bourgeois gentilhomme (Molière)
- 1968 – La crécelle (Charles Dyer)
- 1970 – Le cri de l'engoulevent (Guy Dufresne)
- 1973–74 – Le saut du lit (Ray Cooney et John Chapman)
- 1974 – Teresa (Natalia Ginzburg)
- 1974 – Deux et deux font sexe (Leslei Darbon et Richard Harris)
- 1975 – La libellule (Aldo Nicolaï)
- 1976 – Inès Pérée et Inat Tendue (Réjean Ducharme)
- 1976 – Les Maxibules (Marcel Aymé)
- 1977 – À vos souhaits (Pierre Chesnot)
- 1979 – Harold et Maude (Colin Higgins)
- 1981 – Quelque part... un lac (Albert Millaire)
- 1983 – Le dernier round (Michael Cristofer)
- 1984 – La ronde (Arthur Schnitzler)
- 1985 – L'heureux stratagème (Marivaux)
- 1985 – Chacun sa vérité (Luigi Pirandello)
- 1985 – Drôle de Valentin (Denis R. Anderson)
- 1986 – On m'appelle Émilie (Maria Pacôme)
- 1986 – Nuit d'amour d'un moulin à paroles (Charles Dyer)
- 1987 – Le mariage de Figaro (Beaumarchais)
- 1989 – Les liaisons dangereuses (Christoper Hampton)
- 1989 – Les mensonges de papa (Jean-Raymond Marcoux)
- 1990 – Le voyage magnifique d'Émily Carr (Jovette Marchessault)
- 2005 – Jouliks (Marie-Christine Lê-Huu) — la Mé
- 2012 – Christine, la reine-garçon (Michel Marc Bouchard) — La très vieille reine-mère

=== Film and television ===
- 1959–1961 – En haut de la pente douce (TV series) — Diane Chevalier
- 1960–1962 – La Côte de sable (TV series) — Suzanne
- 1962 – Comme tu me veux (télé-théâtre)
- 1963–1967 – Septième nord (TV series) — Renée Daigneault
- 1964–65 – Monsieur Lecoq (TV series) — Blanche de Courtomieu
- 1968–1972 – Le Paradis terrestre (TV series) — Denise Dumouchel
- 1969 – Deliver Us from Evil (Délivrez-nous du mal) — Lucille
- 1970–1977 – Symphorien (TV series) — Diane Beaulac
- 1971 – Au retour des oies blanches (TV)
- 1973 – And I Love You Dearly — Janet
- 1973 – La Maîtresse — Janet
- 1974 – Les Beaux Dimanches — Hélène
- 1976–1979 – Grand-Papa (TV series) — Marguerite
- 1977 – The Uncanny — Madeleine
- 1977 – Panic (Panique)
- 1979–80 – Caroline (TV series) — Caroline Duplain
- 1983–1985 – La Vie promise (TV series) — Dorothée
- 1984 – Covergirl — Sonia
- 1984–85 – Le 101, ouest, avenue des Pins (TV series) — Geneviève
- 1984–1988 – Le Parc des braves (TV series) — Corinne St-Pierre
- 1986 – La Clé des champs (TV series) — Pauline
- 1986–1989 – Des dames de cœur (TV series) — Micheline Gagnon
- 1989–1991 – Un signe de feu (TV series) — Micheline Gagnon
- 1993 – Catherine Courage (TV) — Mme Thoré-Dumont
- 1994 – Les grands procès (TV) — Madame Biard
- 1997 – Paparazzi (TV series) — Mireille
- 1997 – L'Enfant des Appalaches (TV) — Gertrude
- 1998–2001 – Virginie (TV series) — Pauline Guérin
- 2000 – Stardom
- 2000 – Méchant party — La dame au guichet automatique
- 2004 – Smash (feuilleton TV) — Madame Boivin
- 2006 – My Mother's Secret (Le Secret de ma mère) — Fleurette
- 2006–07 – Kif-Kif (TV series) — Ludmilla Taillefer
- 2007 – La Brunante
- 2008 – Martyrs — Mademoiselle
- 2009 – Tout sur moi — Mère du constable Thibodeau
- 2012 – Laurence Anyways by Xavier Dolan — Mamy Rose

== Awards and distinctions ==
- 1998 – Prix Victor-Morin
- 2005 – Masque for best female performance in a supporting role, Jouliks
- 2014 – Prix Gémeaux (posthumous) for Female Interpretation: Digital Media – Fiction for Michaëlle en sacrament
