= The Tall Man (2012 film) =

- Theatrical release poster
- Directed by: Pascal Laugier
- Written by: Pascal Laugier
- Produced by: Clément Miserez; Kevin DeWalt; Jean-Charles Levy; Scott Kennedy
- Starring: Jessica Biel; Jodelle Ferland; Janet Wright; William B. Davis; Samantha Ferris; Stephen McHattie
- Cinematography: Kamal Derkaoui
- Edited by: Sebastien Prangere
- Music by: Todd Bryanton
- Production companies: Minds Eye Entertainment; Radar Films; Forecast Pictures
- Distributed by: SND Films (worldwide); Image Entertainment (United States)
- Release date: August 31, 2012
- Running time: 106 minutes
- Countries: Canada; France
- Language: English
- Budget: $18.2 million
- Box office: $5,212,903

The Tall Man is a 2012 Canadian-French mystery-horror film written and directed by Pascal Laugier. It was filmed in the Kootenay region of Southeastern British Columbia and stars Jessica Biel. The film is set in a small former mining town where poverty is rife and children are disappearing on a regular basis. The abductions are blamed on a local legend called "the Tall Man". Jessica Biel plays a widowed nurse whose child is abducted, leading her on a desperate chase to recover him.

== Plot ==
Julia lives in a small town in Washington called Cold Rock. She is the town's local nurse, widowed by her husband, who was the town's doctor. Cold Rock was formerly a prosperous mining town, but has become poverty-stricken. There is little work, the school has been closed and the town has virtually vanished from the map. During her day, Julia visits several families. Jenny and Carol live with their mother and her violent, alcoholic boyfriend, who has impregnated Carol. Despite this, their mother did not kick him out, drawing Julia's ire. Instead, she sends away Carol and her baby, whom Julia helped to deliver. Because of her rough life, Jenny is selectively mute, communicating through a journal she carries. She also sketches things she's seen, including "the Tall Man". This is a local legend or urban myth surrounding a being who abducts local children who are never seen again.

Julia returns to her large home on the outskirts of Cold Rock, which she shares with her son David and his nanny. She eats dinner, puts David to bed, and falls asleep on a couch. She awakes to a noise downstairs, followed by a loud radio sermon. She finds the nanny bound and gagged, then rushes to her son's bedroom, finding him gone. While in pursuit of what the viewer believes is "the Tall Man", it is gradually revealed that David is not her son at all, but rather one of the kidnapped children. The kidnapper is actually the real mother of the boy, attempting to take back her child. The rest of the town, skeptical of the mother's accusations, agree to give her a chance to prove her claims.

Julia, with the help of Jenny, pursues the mother, reacquires David, and hands him off to "the Tall Man" in the tunnels which run under the town, left over from the defunct mine. Jenny begs her to send the Tall Man to take her, too. Julia initially refuses but then relents, cautioning her to remain silent about it until the Tall Man comes for her. Julia then waits in her house. The police and FBI arrive, as does an angry mob. The nanny hangs herself, and Julia is taken to jail, where she is despised and threatened as a child killer. Julia admits to kidnapping and murdering the children, but the confession is later revealed to be a lie.

Soon after, Jenny watches her mother engage in a drunken fight with her boyfriend, before laughing with him over it. Disgusted, Jenny walks off into a nearby field, where she finds the Tall Man waiting for her—Julia's husband, who is not dead after all. He takes her to an empty house in a nearby city, providing her with new clothes. He then delivers her to a new family, with a new identity. The Tall Man refuses payment, saying that the organization faces massive risks to rescue each child, with Julia martyring herself to save the organisation, which "rescues" young children from bad homes and places them with good ones, in an attempt to break the cycle of poverty and abuse which passes from one generation to the next.

In Cold Rock, Jenny's birth mother grieves over her runaway daughter, the town continues to decline, and Julia sits in prison. The police have given up on finding the children, thinking that Julia buried them in the tunnels which run for miles and are dangerous to traverse because of cave ins, etc. In comparison, Jenny lives in a beautiful home, where her art is encouraged, and she has the best of everything. She has begun to talk and seems well-adjusted and happy. As she walks to an art class, she gives a voice-over expressing love and gratitude toward her three mothers: her birth mother, whom she misses; Julia, who gave her a chance at a new life; and her new mother, who is providing her with everything she could ever want. As she crosses a park, she sees David with his new family, which he now accepts as his own. (Jenny thinks he and the other younger ones have forgotten and do not recognize her, but the visual cues leave it decidedly open-ended). Despite getting her wish of a better life, she sometimes wishes to return. Jenny's closing thoughts question society's implication that her new life is better.

== Cast ==
- Jessica Biel as Julia Denning
- Jodelle Ferland as Jenny Weaver
- Stephen McHattie as Lt. Dodd
- Janet Wright as Trish
- William B. Davis as Sheriff Chestnut
- Samantha Ferris as Tracy
- Eve Harlow as Christine
- Colleen Wheeler as Mrs. Johnson
- Jakob Davies as Mr. Johnson

== Production ==
Star Jessica Biel said that she enjoyed Pascal Laugier's previous film, Martyrs, and loved the script for The Tall Man, which impressed her with its unpredictable plot twists. She became enthusiastic about the project and wanted to work with him. Principal photography began in September 2010. The film is Pascal Laugier's first English production.

== Release ==
In 2012 The Tall Man premiered at South by Southwest, where it was acquired by Image Entertainment. It received a limited release on August 31, 2012, and was released on Blu-ray Disc and DVD 25 days later on September 25, 2012.

== Reception ==
Reviews were often mixed as; Rotten Tomatoes reports that 41% of the 29 surveyed critics gave it a positive review; the average score was however 5.24/10. Metacritic, which uses a weighted average, assigned the film a score of 52 out of 100, based on 8 critics, indicating "mixed or average" reviews.

Mark Olsen of the Los Angeles Times wrote that Biel's performance was believable and the film atmospheric, but the story becomes ridiculous and nonsensical. Jeanette Catsoulis positively compared it to Stephen King's early work, and designated it as a New York Times Critics' Pick. Chris Packham of The Village Voice called the film implausible and deceptive in its narrative twists. Scott Tobias of The A.V. Club rated the film B and described the film's plot as unpredictable but unwieldy, though Biel's performance and a final plot twist save the film from the expected mediocrity of a direct-to-video release. Scott Weinberg of Fearnet wrote that the film's increasingly unpredictable plot twists and acting by Biel cause it to defy expectations and may encourage discussion among viewers. Elizabeth Kerr of The Hollywood Reporter wrote that, like Martyrs, the film had arresting imagery but a leaden narrative.

== See also ==
- Happy Town
