= Martyrs (2015 film) =

Horror film by the Goetz brothers

- Theatrical release poster
- Directed by: Kevin Goetz; Michael Goetz
- Screenplay by: Mark L. Smith
- Based on: Martyrs by Pascal Laugier
- Produced by: Peter Safran; Agnes Mentre
- Starring: Troian Bellisario; Bailey Noble; Kate Burton
- Cinematography: Sean O'Dea
- Edited by: Jake York
- Music by: Evan Goldman
- Production companies: Wild Bunch; The Safran Company; Blumhouse Productions
- Distributed by: Anchor Bay Entertainment
- Release dates: October 9, 2015 (Sitges Film Festival); January 22, 2016 (U.S.)
- Running time: 86 minutes
- Country: United States
- Language: English
- Box office: $1.5 million

Martyrs is a 2015 American horror film directed by Kevin and Michael Goetz, written by Mark L. Smith, and starring Troian Bellisario, Bailey Noble and Kate Burton. A remake of Pascal Laugier's 2008 film of the same name, the story sees a woman who, after having been kidnapped and tortured as a child, goes to kill her supposed captors, and with her friend discovers the dark truth behind her abuse.

The development of Martyrs began in 2008, with Daniel Stamm originally attached to direct the project from Smith's screenplay. The Goetz brothers were ultimately hired to direct the film in 2015 with financing through Blumhouse Productions. Principal photography took place over sixteen days in Los Angeles, California in early 2015.

Martyrs premiered at the Sitges Film Festival on October 9, 2015, and was released in limited theaters on January 22, 2016, by Anchor Bay Entertainment. The film was panned critically, with most critics deeming it inferior to the original film.

== Plot ==
As a child, Lucie Jurin escapes from a building where she has been held captive and tortured. Lucie spends the rest of her childhood at St. Mary's Orphanage, where she is haunted by hallucinations of a strange-looking creature that attempts to attack her at every turn. Over time, she grows extremely close to Anna Assaoui, a fellow resident at the orphanage and Lucie's only friend.

Ten years later, Lucie goes to the countryside home of the Patterson family with a shotgun and executes all four family members, believing them to be related to her childhood torture. Lucie calls Anna who is concerned that the family may not be responsible for Lucie's torture. Anna is horrified by the scene when she arrives at the house and calls 9-1-1 while Lucie sleeps but hangs up. Anna discovers Mrs. Patterson is still alive and tries to help her escape. Lucie suddenly tackles Mrs. Patterson outside and stabs her to death. While cleaning the crime scene, Anna finds a secret panel in a closet which leads to a hidden basement. Anna finds a little girl named Sam and rescues her. The two regroup with Lucie and safely make their exit from the basement when several trucks arrive with Eleanor, Fenton and several other people to give chase; after the pursuit, all three girls are soon captured and taken under custody.

Later, Anna is interrogated by Eleanor, who explains that her group is a collective dedicated to discovering what waits in the afterlife; by torturing women and young girls to their breaking point, they believe they can create Martyrs with an ability to glimpse briefly into "the other side". Giving Anna gratitude for bringing Lucie back, she values Lucie as a rare find, as she is capable of enduring great pain without dying. As an example, Eleanor has Anna watch from an overhead room as the cabal gathers to observe a captive woman being burned at the stake. After the woman dies, the priest overseeing her ordeal looks in Eleanor's direction and shakes his head. Lucie is taken for surgery and Eleanor orders the doctor to perform a procedure on Lucie. The doctor cuts and peels a piece of flesh from Lucie's back as part of the final preparations for her martyrdom.

Meanwhile, Anna is taken to a pit outside and buried alive for being Lucie's accomplice but she digs her way into a drainage ditch and escapes. She fights her way back into the underground facility, killing several cabal members. She frees Sam and tells her to run for help. While she searches for Lucie, she is attacked by Fenton and shot in the shoulder but eventually kills him with the help of another captive woman. Anna gets stabbed in the side by one of the cabal members before shooting him.

Anna finds and interrupts an assembly gathered to watch Lucie die on a cross. Lucie gets a look in her eyes that the group feels signifies martyrdom and Anna, wielding Fenton's gun, insists that Lucie be freed. Lucie reveals what she saw in a whisper to Anna. Eleanor demands to know what Lucie said; the priest says he heard Lucie's whispers before quickly putting a gun in his mouth and killing himself. Anna shoots Eleanor and the rest of the cabal members flee. Anna embraces Lucie as they lie dying on the floor. With the police on their way, both women's eyes glaze over with the look of martyrdom.

== Cast ==
- Troian Bellisario as Lucie Jurin
  - Ever Prishkulnik as Young Lucie
- Bailey Noble as Anna Assaoui
  - Elyse Cole as Young Anna
- Caitlin Carmichael as Sam
- Romy Rosemont as Mrs. Patterson
- Toby Huss as Fenton
- Melissa Tracy as The Creature
- Kate Burton as Eleanor
- Blake Robbins as Mr. Patterson
- Taylor John Smith as Son
- Lexi DiBenedetto as Daughter
- Diana Hopper as Sarah
- Ivar Brogger as Priest

== Production ==
=== Development ===
The project dates back to at least 2008 with the director of the original, Pascal Laugier, negotiating for the rights for an American remake of his film, Martyrs, released that same year. Daniel Stamm was set to direct at this time but later dropped out due to budgetary concerns. Specifically he worried about "plateauing", saying that "if you're a filmmaker who makes two movies in the same budget bracket, that becomes your thing. You are the guy for the $3 million movie, and then that's all you do", further elaborating that his agent advised him against making the film for this reason.

Screenwriter Mark L. Smith had stated that he tried to avoid showing as much of the violence on screen as possible which he stated resulted in "less about watching someone be tortured and more about trying to save a friend." he has stated that he chose this route because " it’s more just my taste." Early on Kristen Stewart was considered for a role, though her presence in the film was later denied by Stamm.

The production was ultimately executed with financing from Blumhouse Tilt, a subsidiary of Blumhouse Productions, with brothers Kevin and Michael Goetz directing the project. The screenplay by Smith, which had been completed years prior, was "inherited" for the production, and shooting began approximately two months after the Goetzes had been presented with it.

=== Casting ===
Troian Bellisario was cast in the lead role of Lucie after auditioning for the part. Kevin Goetz stated that Bellisario "committed [to the role] like you wouldn't believe." Bailey Noble was cast opposite Bellisario as Anna.

=== Filming ===
Principal photography of Martyrs took place in Los Angeles over only sixteen days. According to Kevin Goetz, the film's shooting schedule was "fast" and comprised back-to-back night shoots. He added, "We kind of went into it like, 'Yeah, sure, not a penny over [budget] ...' Seven days into shooting and we really needed something? We didn't get it. Not that [Blumhouse] weren't supportive, but this was the deal we signed up for. And there were times when they helped us out. They were great, but you're going to definitely see a sixteen-day shoot."

== Release ==
Anchor Bay Entertainment acquired all North American rights for Martyrs from Wild Bunch after the film premiered at the 2015 Cannes Film Festival. The film had its world premiere at the Sitges Film Festival on October 9, 2015, and was later screened at the Screamfest Horror Film Festival in Los Angeles that same month.

The film had a limited theatrical release in the United States on January 22, 2016. It was released theatrically in Russia and Ukraine on February 4, 2016, before premiering internationally in several other countries over the following several months.

=== Home media ===
Anchor Bay Entertainment released Martyrs on DVD and Blu-ray on February 2, 2016.

== Reception ==
=== Box office ===
Though given a limited theatrical release in the United States, Martyrs had significant earnings of $181,389 in Brazil and $80,673 in Russian cinemas. Its ultimate worldwide gross totaled $1,548,909.

=== Critical response ===
Martyrs received unfavorable reviews from critics. On the review aggregator website Rotten Tomatoes, 9% of 33 critics' reviews are positive, with an average rating of 3.3/10. The website's consensus reads: "Martyrs flays off everything that gave the original its icy horrific beauty, leaving us with an empty, pointless remake." Metacritic, which uses a weighted average, assigned the film a score of 22 out of 100, based on 13 critics, indicating "generally unfavorable" reviews.

Jeanette Catsoulis of The New York Times panned the film, writing: "Shatteringly stupid and repulsively misogynistic, Martyrs mashes revenge, torture and the supernatural into one solid, quasi-religious lump." Noel Murray of the Los Angeles Times was similarly critical, deeming the film "pointlessly repellent" and noting that it "doesn’t alter the material substantially enough to give it fresh meaning."

Henry Barnes of The Guardian noted that the film was "predictably, less hardcore" than its source material, summarizing, "What's left after the gore is stripped away is a mildly bloody, meatless horror. There is just enough smart editing (cutting the violence of a home invasion with images of sliced tomatoes and frying bacon adds flavour) to keep it clinging on to life." Paste magazine's Dom Sinacola echoed a similar sentiment, writing: "While the American remake of Martyrs shares much of the same plot as its predecessor, gone is the ambiguity and the accusation—and much of the brutality, to be honest." Kalyn Corrigan of Bloody Disgusting wrote that "aside from creating a much tamer version, the 2015 Martyrs headed by the Goetz brothers feels too similar to the first film, bordering on a shot-for-shot remake that doesn't really bring anything new or worthwhile to the table in order to justify its existence".

Kenji Fujishima of Slant Magazine awarded the film a two out of four star-rating, noting that the directors "infuse their version with an eerie slow-burn vibe distinctly its own, exemplified most of all by Evan Goldman's portentously droning electronic score. But if the original ended on a nihilistic punchline, the Goetzes' more sentimental finale is scarcely an improvement, forgoing Laugier's perverse spiritual aspirations for a mundane confirmation of the two female main characters' emotional bond."

Reel Film Reviews critic David Nusair gave the film a rare favorable review, noting that it "pushes into a midsection that captures the spirit of its predecessor while also boasting a number of unexpected twists and turns—with the Goetz siblings punctuating the narrative with several impressively tense sequences." Starburst magazine's John Townsend awarded the film a six out of ten star-rating, summarizing it as an "entertaining, fun and at times brutal horror film that will probably delight the casual horror fan. It is a decent, if diluted version of a film that many will be unaware of and is, for want of a better word, fine."

=== Pascal Laugier's response ===
When asked about the remake, Laugier responded, "I had a bad contract, I didn't even get paid for it! That's really the only thing I regret in my career: That my name is now associated with such a junk film and I didn't even get a cent for it! I tried to watch it but only got through 20 minutes. It was like watching my mother get raped! Then I stopped. Life is too short. In the American system, a movie like Martyrs is just not possible - they saw my movie and then turned it into something completely uninteresting."

== See also ==
- List of films featuring home invasions
