= Martyrs (2008 film) =

Psychological horror film by Pascal Laugier

- Theatrical release poster
- Directed by: Pascal Laugier
- Written by: Pascal Laugier
- Produced by: Richard Grandpierre; Simon Trottier
- Starring: Morjana Alaoui; Mylène Jampanoï
- Cinematography: Stéphane Martin; Nathalie Moliavko-Visotzky
- Edited by: Sébastien Prangère
- Music by: Seppuku Paradigm
- Production companies: Eskwad; TCB Film
- Distributed by: Wild Bunch
- Release dates: 24 August 2008 (FrightFest); 3 September 2008 (France)
- Running time: 99 minutes
- Countries: France; Canada
- Language: French
- Budget: €2.8 million
- Box office: $1.1 million

Martyrs is a 2008 psychological horror film written and directed by Pascal Laugier. The film stars Morjana Alaoui, Mylène Jampanoï, and Catherine Bégin. Set in 1986, it follows the story of Lucie, a traumatized young woman who seeks revenge against individuals who abducted and tortured her as a child. Her actions, aided by her friend Anna, also a victim of abuse, result in dire consequences.

Laugier wrote the screenplay for Martyrs during a period in which he was suicidal and experiencing clinical depression, inspiring him to "make a movie about pain." He was particularly influenced by Catholicism while writing the film. Martyrs was an international co-production between France and Canada. Principal photography began in Montreal in 2007.

Martyrs screened at the French film market Marché du Film in May 2008, where it incited audience walkouts due to its graphic and disturbing content. After screening at numerous film festivals, it was theatrically released in France on 3 September 2008, where it faced notable controversy. The French film ratings board, Le commission de classification des œuvres cinématographiques, initially granted it an 18+ rating, forbidding audience members under the age of eighteen from seeing the film. Following an appeal by the film's producers, this was overturned by the French Minister of Culture, and its rating was reduced to 16+.

Critical responses to Martyrs were highly polarized, with some film critics condemning it as a violent splatter film, while others praised it for its thematic content. It has been cited by some critics as being part of the New French Extremity movement, an association Laugier denounced. Film scholars have observed that the film features themes of revenge, Catholic sainthood, transcendence, and existentialism. In 2017, IGN named it one of the best horror films of all time, ranking it number 32 in a list of 100 films, while Rolling Stone included it in a 2021 list of the greatest horror films of the 21st century. It is regarded as a contemporary classic of the horror genre. An American-produced remake of the same name, written by Mark L. Smith, was released in 2015.

== Plot ==
In 1971, Lucie Jurin escapes from a slaughterhouse where she has been imprisoned and tortured for over a year. She is placed in an orphanage, where she befriends Anna Assaoui. One day, Anna finds Lucie in a bathtub, her arm covered in cuts. Lucie begs Anna not to tell anyone. Anna embraces her, imploring her not to cut herself. Lucie responds that she did not do it. Later, Lucie is attacked by a disfigured, demonic woman.

15 years later, Lucie invades the home of a seemingly normal family, the Belfonds, whom she believes were involved in her torture as a child, and methodically kills each of them with a shotgun. She calls Anna and gives her the house's address. While waiting for Anna to arrive, the demonic woman attacks Lucie, stabbing her hand and cutting her back. Lucie flees the house and encounters Anna, who tends to her injuries and enters the house despite Lucie's warning not to. Anna is horrified by the carnage, but decides to help Lucie clean the crime scene and dispose of the bodies. Anna kisses Lucie, who rejects her. Lucie is once again attacked by the woman and hides with Anna in a bedroom. Lucie recalls her escape, during which she ran from a pleading fellow prisoner who begged her for help. Anna discovers the Belfond mother is still alive and tries to help her escape, but Lucie catches them and beats the mother to death with a hammer. The demonic woman again attacks Lucie, but Anna only sees Lucie hurting herself; the woman resembles the victim that Lucie left behind at the slaughterhouse and is a psychological manifestation of Lucie's guilt. Lucie then runs outside and kills herself by slitting her own throat.

The following morning, Anna, while on the phone with her estranged, abusive mother, discovers a secret passageway in the home's living room, leading to a subterranean chamber containing illuminated photographs of torture, and a living, brutalized, emaciated woman, proving Lucie's claims about the Belfonds. Anna attempts to help the woman, who is hysterical and nonverbal. She removes a steel blindfold that has been stapled to the woman's skull and helps bathe her, only to later find her mutilating her arm with a knife. A group of people arrives at the house, kills the woman, and captures Anna. The group's leader, identified only as Mademoiselle, explains that they belong to a secret society seeking to uncover the secrets of the afterlife by creating "martyrs". They capture individuals and inflict on them systematic acts of torture, believing that their physical suffering will result in transcendental insight into the world beyond. Though they have only produced "victims" who succumbed to the pain and were unable to speak, the group is determined to create martyrs who accept their suffering and report their visions of the afterlife.

Anna becomes the group's newest subject. After a period of being brutally beaten and degraded, she is told that she has progressed further than any other subject and reached the "final stage", demonstrating her acceptance of her fate. She is surgically flayed alive and reportedly enters an "ecstatic" state. Mademoiselle arrives, eager to learn Anna's secrets, and Anna whispers into her ear. Members of the society gather at the house to pay veneration to Anna for her martyrdom and hear Mademoiselle's announcement of the groundbreaking testimony. While waiting for Mademoiselle, who is in the bathroom, Étienne, an assistant, asks her from outside the door if what Anna said was clear. She unequivocally confirms and asks him in turn if he can imagine what comes after death. After he says no, Mademoiselle produces a handgun, tells him to "keep doubting," and shoots herself.

An intertitle explains that "martyr" is Greek for "witness". The film ends with a shot of Anna lying catatonic on a table, seemingly looking at something far away. During the credits, home movies of Anna and Lucie as children are shown.

== Cast ==
- Mylène Jampanoï as Lucie Jurin
  - Jessie Pham as young Lucie
- Morjana Alaoui as Anna Assaoui
  - Erika Scott as young Anna
- Catherine Bégin as Mademoiselle
- Isabelle Chasse as The Creature
- Robert Toupin as Mr. Belfond (the father)
- Patricia Tulasne as Gabrielle Belfond (the mother)
- Juliette Gosselin as Marie Belfond
- Xavier Dolan-Tadros as Antoine Belfond
- Louise Boisvert as Anna's mother (voice)
- Jean-Marie Moncelet as Étienne
- Emilie Miskdjian as Sarah

== Themes ==
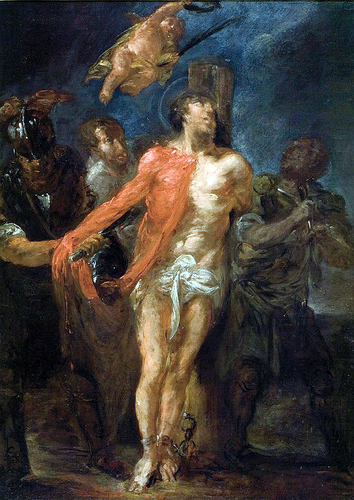
Michael Willmann's The Flaying of Saint Bartholomew (c. 1660); the character of Anna suffers a similar fate in the film, demonstrating its central theme of martyrdom

Critic Maitland McDonagh observes prominent themes of Roman Catholic sainthood and martyrdom in the film's exploration of spiritual transcendence through physical pain. Film scholar Brian H. Collins also notes that the secret society depicted in the film appears to be "vaguely Catholic", and its practices in attempting to elicit religious ecstasy through physical suffering and torture mimic the martyrdom of numerous Roman Catholic saints.

Film scholar Ruth McPhee writes in Female Masochism in Film: Sexuality, Ethics and Aesthetics (2016) that Anna's characterization "accords closely to the conventions of the narratives of Christian saints and martyrs." McPhee adds that Anna's experiences as a captive of the secret society mimic the hagiographic accounts of Saint Catherine, and cites the film as "almost unsurpassed in the relentless and visceral extremity of the suffering shown."

Laugier himself stated that he intended to make the film's audience "feel real pain" and to "share it as part of an honest process [of] communion... It was a very Catholic process. I have a very Catholic mind." In a 2009 interview with Electric Sheep magazine, he stated that he feels "the Western world is sick ... Horror cinema allowed me to express this in a very direct way. Martyrs is almost a work of prospective fiction that shows a dying world, almost like a pre-apocalypse. It's a world where evil triumphed a long time ago, where consciences have died out under the reign of money and where people spend their time hurting one another. It's a metaphor, of course, but the film describes things that are not that far from what we're experiencing today."

The film's graphic violence resulted in it being associated with the New French Extremity movement, which Laugier vocally denounced. Literary professor Gwendolyn Audrey Foster similarly challenges the sentiment that Martyrs belongs in this category, writing that its "nihilism is complete and impossible to dismiss, making it a far different experience from other extreme horror films", also citing Laugier's statement that the film exists in a world "in which evil triumphed a long time ago". Grace Britten of The Film Magazine states that the film features nihilistic and "gut-wrenching existentialist" themes.

Foster suggests that the film's audience "become martyrs in a sense". While Foster feels that the film retains some ambiguity in its conclusion, she writes, "in the end, it seems clear to me that there is no afterlife, no union with God, and no ascendance into the heaven for the final victim in Martyrs, even as it conjures up iconic images of female martyrdom, such as that of Bernini's sculpture The Ecstasy of Saint Teresa (1652), or Carl Th. Dreyer's film La Passion de Jeanne d’Arc (1928)."

Film writer Andrew Couzens echoes Foster's belief that the audience become martyrs, writing in a 2013 article for The Artifice:

We, like Anna, must earn the revelation the film offers us. The film hasn’t offered us cheap visceral thrills, but a contemplative treatise on how we think of violence. The victim, the sufferer, is no longer disempowered, but may be the most spiritually powerful being possible. As an audience we are invited to suffer rather than enjoy the cheap, visceral thrills of another torture porn film. And it is through this invitation that we, too, may be martyrs.

== Production ==
=== Development ===
Writer-director Pascal Laugier, who had previously made his directorial debut with the supernatural horror film Saint Ange (2005), wrote the screenplay for Martyrs after being inspired by Eli Roth's Hostel (2005), and intended to "make a movie about pain." Laugier stated he was in a severely depressed state at the time of writing the film, and was nearly suicidal. Visually, he was partly inspired by Carl Theodore Dreyer's The Passion of Joan of Arc (1928), and based the film's final shot on a still of the dying Joan of Arc (portrayed by Renée Jeanne Falconetti), an image he pasted to the final page of the screenplay. He was also inspired by The Texas Chain Saw Massacre (1974).

On pitching the project, Laugier commented that "the film was rejected by all the big French studios, by a lot of actresses, too. […] The film was really supported by Canal+, the only television channel in France that still finances some unusual projects".

=== Casting ===
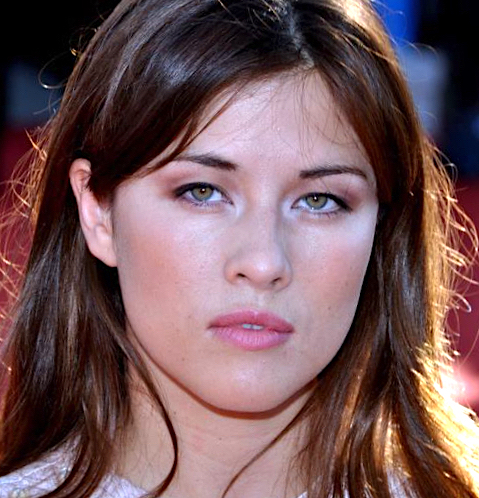
Laugier had actress Mylène Jampanoï (pictured in 2012) study the performances of Isabelle Adjani in Possession (1981) and Jamie Lee Curtis in Halloween (1978) to prepare for her role.

Mylène Jampanoï, who was cast as Lucie, was drawn to the project after being profoundly affected by the screenplay. "When I chose this movie, my agent told me maybe it's not a good choice as an actress," she recalled. "'You should maybe start with a comedy!' But the script was amazing, really amazing. I knew this would be a film that people would either love or hate". Laugier said he was attracted to Jampanoï's charisma and that she was almost an "immediate choice". "When [Mylène] enters a room, the temperature changes, people behave differently. It would be impossible to be a film director and not feel that", Laugier said. "Moreover, her natural energy is pretty dark. She’s dangerous and dark, full of passionate contradictions."

Prior to shooting, Laugier had Jampanoï watch Andrzej Żuławski's Possession (1981) and John Carpenter's Halloween (1978) to draw inspiration from the lead performances of Isabelle Adjani and Jamie Lee Curtis, respectively.

Morjana Alaoui, who was cast as Anna, was also attracted to the project after being impressed by its screenplay: "The first time I read the script, I was just like, 'Wow. I have to be a part of this.' After Pascal cast me as Anna, I started rereading it and every page I was like, 'Oh my God. How am I going to do this? I'm gonna die'". Laugier cast Alaoui after another actress dropped out of the project, and was partly drawn to her after seeing her performance in Marock (2005). He decided on Alaoui for the role of Anna within "five minutes" of meeting her, as he felt she possessed a "luminous" energy that lent itself to her role as a saint-like figure in the film.

In preparation for the shoot, Laugier spent two months undertaking rehearsals with Jampanoï and Alaoui.

=== Filming ===
Principal photography of Martyrs took place in Montreal, Quebec, Canada in 2007. It was shot on 35mm film, and utilized a significant amount of handheld camerawork. The interiors of the house in the film were entirely constructed on a soundstage. Laugier said he chose to film in Canada for "practical reasons", adding:

Once there, we integrated it into the artistic plan. The light in Quebec is really remarkable, and brought an additional emotion to the film. The sky has shades of grey that I’ve never seen anywhere else, and the whites are also distinctive. It brought back feelings I had while watching Canadian genre films from the '70s and '80s. David Cronenberg of course, but also lesser-known directors like William Fruet or George Mihalka. They made some B movies that I liked nostalgically and which made this country very mythological for me.

Laugier stated that his filming approach was much looser than that of his previous film, Saint Ange (2004), and that he refused to complete any storyboards or engage in excessive preparation, instead relying on a "very precise general impression" he had of what he wanted the film to look and feel like. He further stated that the main difficulty other than technical issues such as special effects was to keep actresses Jampanoï and Alouai in a heightened emotional state on set. In order to facilitate this, Laugier kept the two isolated from most of the crew.

Jampanoï recalled that she found the shoot emotionally difficult: "Every night when I went back to my room, I just cried, because I was so physically and psychologically tired. All my scenes are violent." Jampanoï also stated that, though she respected Laugier's working style, she found him to be "as short-tempered as me... I have a huge amount of admiration for him... but we did end up clashing". Laugier confirmed this, recalling that at one point during the shoot, she lost her temper and "really scared" him: "The technicians were scared of her and at the same time they were worried for her. We really had a sensation of imminent catastrophe. It was an amazing experience, and I’ll never forget it."

Production was temporarily halted for over a month after Alaoui fell 3 metres (9.8 ft) off a soundstage, breaking several bones in her foot.

=== Special effects ===
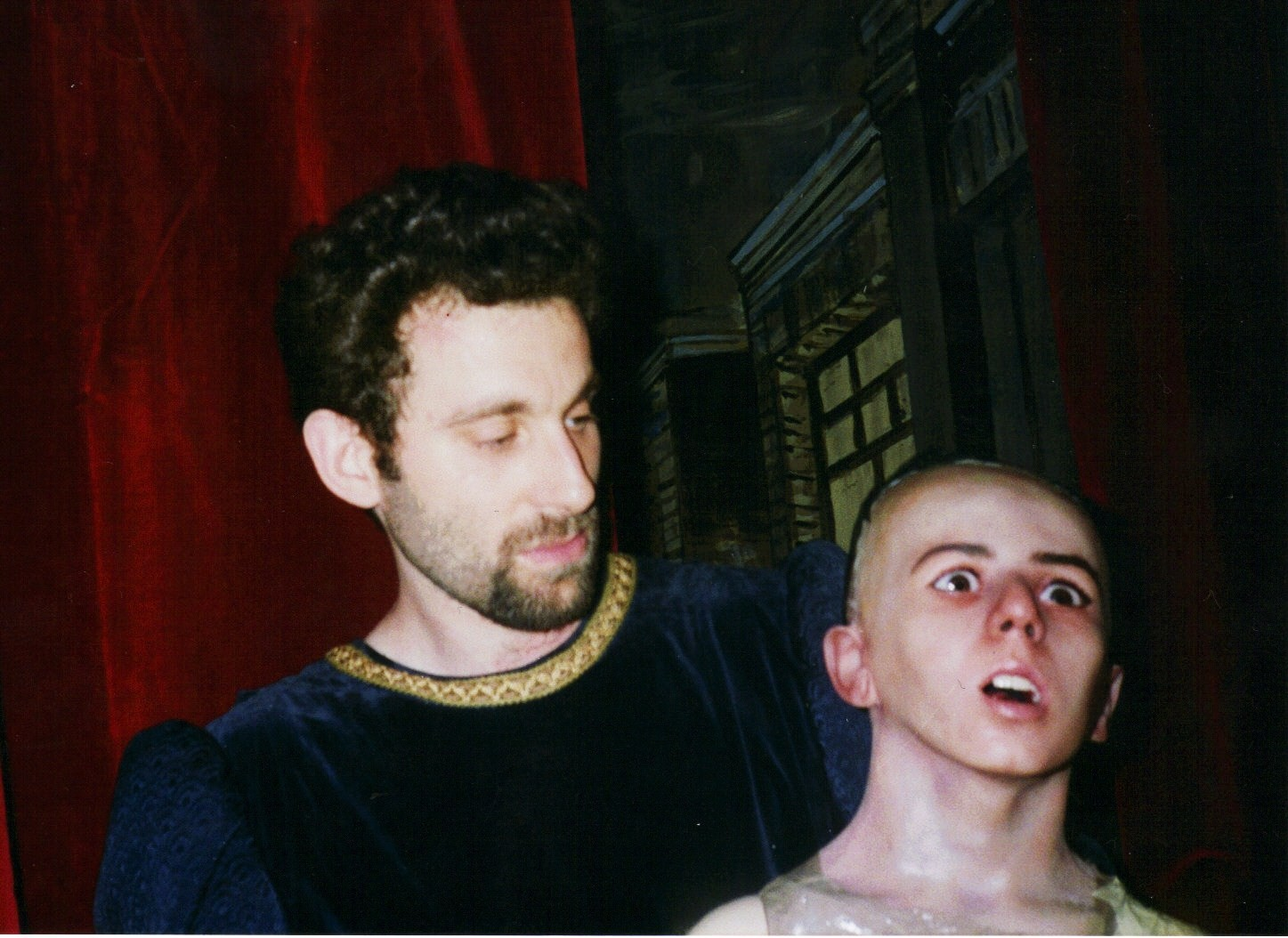
Special effects designer Benoît Lestang (pictured here in 1996), who died prior to the film's theatrical release

The film's special effects were designed by Benoît Lestang and Montreal-based makeup artist Adrien Morot, who had previously worked on several major Hollywood productions such as 300 and Night at the Museum (both 2006). Laugier had collaborated with Lestang on previous projects, and the two were close friends. Lestang described his work on the film as the "biggest project of [his] career", stating that the workload equated to that of four or five films. The film features a mixture of both practical and digital special effects, some of which were completed with the use of green screen.

Lestang's makeup for the film was extensive, and required significant time to complete each day for Jampanoï and Alaoui. Alaoui recalled that "Benoît’s good mood and serenity permitted me to breathe during the filming", while Jamapnoï added that his sense of humor helped her "tremendously" during the extensive makeup applications.

Alaoui's makeup was the most extensive, particularly for the filming of scenes in which her character is seen flayed alive. To accomplish the necessary makeup effects, Lestang would spend approximately four hours applying Alaoui's prosthetics: "We started her daily makeup at 3 a.m.! Considering the filming, and the three hours of taking off the makeup, I worked exhausting 19 hour days."

Lestang, who committed suicide prior to the film's release, was posthumously honored (along with Morot) for his makeup and special effects at the Sitges Film Festival, winning the award for Best Makeup.

== Music ==
The film's original score was composed by the French electronic duo Seppuku Paradigm, composed of brothers Willie and Alex Cortés. The Cortéses were hired late into the post-production process to score the film after a "high-profile musician" dropped out of the project.

Rodney Perkins of ScreenAnarchy described the group's score for the film as ranging from "creepy ambient to acoustic balladry, all of which adds an extra emotional depth to the film. The main theme is particularly effective as the soft melodies and contextual lyrics are a stark contrast to the film's hard imagery."

The Omega Productions Records released the full score on vinyl in 2020.

== Release ==
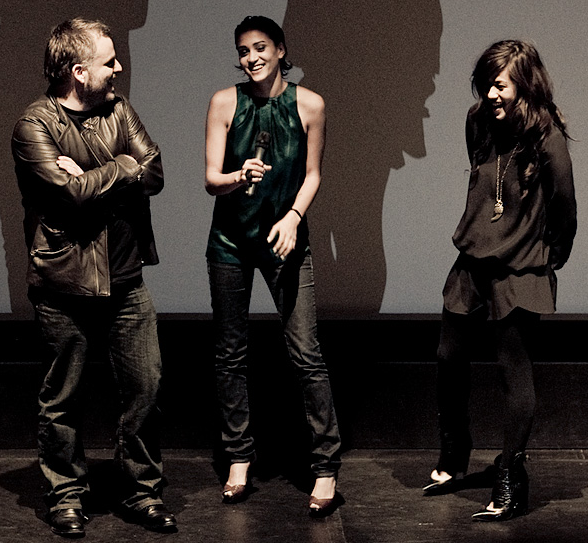
Director Laugier and stars Alaoui and Jampanoï attending the film's premiere at the 2008 Toronto International Film Festival

Martyrs was exhibited at the Marché du Film film market in Cannes in May 2008, where it incited walkouts from some audience members. Following its screening at Cannes, the film was sold to Wild Bunch for European distribution, while The Weinstein Company acquired U.S. distribution rights. It was subsequently shown at the London FrightFest on 24 August 2008. The film received a theatrical release in France the following week, on 3 September 2008.

In Canada, the film was screened at the Toronto International Film Festival on 10 September 2008 as part of the Midnight Madness section, followed by a 19 October 2008 showing at Montreal's Festival du nouveau cinéma. In the United States, it was shown on 25 September 2008 at Fantastic Fest in Austin, Texas, and at Screamfest in Los Angeles on 18 October 2008.

The film was shown at a number of other international film festivals throughout the remainder of 2008, including the Stockholm International Film Festival, the Helsinki Film Festival, Rome Film Fest, and the Mar Del Plata Film Festival. In 2009, it was shown at Spain's San Sebastián International Film Festival, Taiwan's Golden Horse Film Festival, and FICCO in Mexico.

According to Laugier, a man collapsed during the film's 7 October 2008 screening at the Sitges Film Festival, and a woman vomited during the film's screening at the Toronto International Film Festival.

=== Controversy and censorship ===
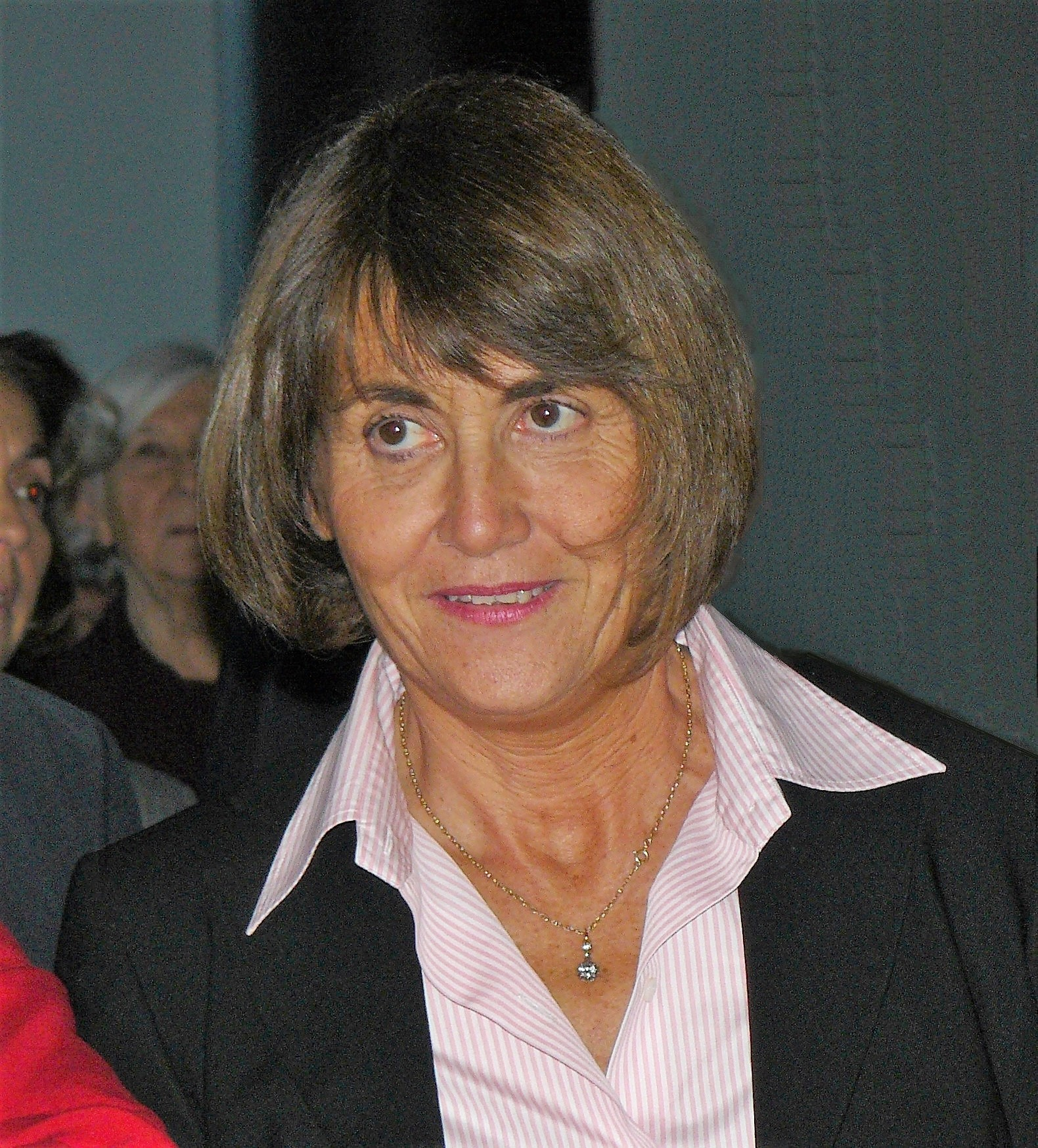
The French Minister of Culture, Christine Albanel, defended the producers' protests against its 18+ rating in France.

In France, the film faced significant controversy from the country's film rating system, which was chronicled in a documentary titled Martyrs vs Censorship, directed by Frédéric Ambroisine in June 2008. The French Commission de classification des œuvres cinématographiques initially rated the film 18+ (unsuitable for children under 18 or forbidden in cinemas for persons under 18), which the producers of the film unsuccessfully appealed. It was the second film, after Saw III (2006), to receive such a rating since the board's inception in 1990.

As a last resort, the French Society of Film Directors (SRF) asked the French ministry of culture to examine the decision, remarking that "this is the first time a French genre film has been threatened with such a rating". The Union of Film Journalists adopted the same position as the SRF, claiming censorship. The Minister of Culture Christine Albanel eventually asked the Commission of Classification to reduce its rating, which was done in July 2008. Martyrs was finally rated 16+, and released theatrically in France on 3 September 2008.

Recounting the film's rating controversy, Laugier said:

In France, when you get an 18+ rating, your film is dead. It's like a porno. It's like XXX. It was a way for them to censor me without asking me to cut anything. So we fought a lot and I was supported by all the unions of the French film industry. I was very surprised. It was a matter of principle. Even for people who didn't like the movie, it was a matter of freedom of speech and expression.

The Weinstein Company purchased North American distribution rights to the film following its screening at Cannes, but producer Bob Weinstein was ultimately so revolted by the film that they chose not to release it theatrically. The film never received a theatrical release in the United States and was instead released directly to DVD. A heavily edited cut of the film was given an R rating by the Motion Picture Association for "disturbing/severe aberrant behavior involving strong bloody violence, torture, child abuse and some nudity."

=== Home media ===
Wild Side Video released the film on DVD in France in 2009. In the United States, Genius Products released the film in both unrated and R-rated DVD editions in early 2009, as part of the Weinstein Company's Dimension Extreme home media label. The British distributor Optimum Releasing issued a Blu-ray edition of the film in the United Kingdom in May 2009, and a Canadian Blu-ray followed in 2010 from Entertainment One Films.

On 16 September 2022, the Australian distributor Umbrella Entertainment released a limited special edition region-free Blu-ray edition as part of their "Beyond Genres" series. Eureka Entertainment's Masters of Cinema line released the film on 4K UHD format in the United Kingdom limited to 6,000 copies on 27 October 2025.

== Reception ==
=== Box office ===
Upon its theatrical release in France, Martyrs earned $282,362 during its opening weekend, with a final domestic gross of $723,611. It was released theatrically in several other European countries, as well as Australia and South Korea. The film's final worldwide gross was $1,149,138.

=== Critical response ===
Martyrs divided critics upon its release, with some condemning it for its extreme violence, and others praising it for its themes and artistic value. The film was widely categorized as an example of new era French horror films akin to Inside with regard to the level of violence it depicts. On the review aggregator website Rotten Tomatoes, 64% of 39 critics' reviews are positive, with an average rating of 6.1/10. The website's consensus reads: "A real polarising movie, this Gallic torture-porn is graphic, brutal, nasty and gruesome and not to everyone's taste."

Commenting on the controversy surrounding the film, director Laugier said he felt "insulted" by many critics' misinterpretations of Martyrs, but conceded: "It’s not a likable movie. Even me, myself, I hate the film."

Todd Brown of ScreenAnarchy called it "without a doubt the single most divisive film to screen in the Cannes Marché Du Film this year," while Ryan Turek at ShockTillYouDrop said that the film "is the new yard stick against which all forms of extreme genre films should be measured against." Jordan Mintzer, reviewing the film for Variety, gave it an unfavorable assessment, describing it as a "splatterfest" that "offers a few genuine scares early on, but they're quickly washed away by all the blood tossed around."

The Montreal Gazette's John Griffin awarded the film a three-and-a-half out of four-star rating, describing it as "a film of almost unspeakable horror and sadism [that] is also a cleverly controlled exercise in hardcore terror with a real end in mind". Simon Abrams of Slant Magazine felt the film transcended a straightforward splatter film, praising its boldness, writing that it has "intelligence and a dogged determination to do and to say what its predecessors could or would not."

Critic Maitland McDonagh wrote that the film "has more than can-you-top-this shocks in mind: For all its brutality, Martyrs is conspicuously high minded, rooted in the centuries-old notion that spiritual transcendence lies just beyond the horizon of pain... You don't have to be Catholic to shudder at Pascal Laugier's Martyrs, but it helps." Andrew Mack of ScreenAnarchy similarly commented on the film's religious themes, writing: "Because it starts so strong yet impersonal and switches to slow, methodical and deeply, deeply personal it will then turn off many viewers... Certainly anyone familiar with religious history will be more impacted by the answers and the reasons why our characters endure and suffer so much in this film. Hopefully that answer will disgust you as much as it did me."

Anton Bitel of Britain's Eye For Film praised the film, saying it "eludes the 'torture porn' label precisely by questioning what those terms might mean, what appeal they might possibly have, and what questions – fundamental, even metaphysical questions – they might answer". Jamie Graham of Total Film called Martyrs "one of the most extreme pictures ever made, and one of the best horror movies of the last decade". He also likened it to "a torture-porn movie for Guardian readers", one that owed as much to Francis Bacon and Raphael as to its genre contemporaries. By contrast, writer and film scholar Jon Towlson says Martyrs' "political intentions are less overt, more ambivalent and ultimately nihilistic" compared to its contemporaries. "Putting the audience 'through it,'" he says, "is the film's raison d'etre".

The New York Times's Erik Piepenburg praised the film in a 2024 retrospective review, but concluded: "The final, pivotal scene, in which the film’s gruesome actions are sort-of explained, left me with such a deep sense of sadness and despair that it took me days to get over it." Writing in a retrospective for Collider, Matt Goldberg declared:

I hate this film. But is it a bad film? Not in the least. In fact, both characters are engaging, their predicament is exhilarating and fun to track, and the movie’s got no trouble supporting its big twist. My only problem with Martyrs is that it’s too scary. This isn’t a movie that’ll have you checking under the bed or leaving the lights on at night, but rather one with a grand finale that’s so unnerving, it’ll eat away at you long after it ends”.

=== Accolades ===
Institution	Year	Category	Recipient	Result	Ref.
Fangoria Chainsaw Awards	2010	Best Actress	Morjana Alaoui	Won	
Fangoria Chainsaw Awards	2010	Best Screenplay	Pascal Laugier	Won	
Fangoria Chainsaw Awards	2010	Best Limited-Release/Direct-to-Video Film	Martyrs	Nominated	
Fangoria Chainsaw Awards	2010	Best Supporting Actress	Mylène Jampanoï	Nominated	
Fangoria Chainsaw Awards	2010	Best Makeup/Creature FX	Benoît Lestang	Nominated	
Fright Meter Award	2009	Best Screenplay	Pascal Laugier	Won	
Fright Meter Award	2009	Best Makeup	Benoît Lestang	Won	
Fright Meter Award	2009	Best Horror Film	Martyrs	Nominated	
Fright Meter Award	2009	Best Director	Pascal Laugier	Nominated	
Fright Meter Award	2009	Best Supporting Actress	Catherine Bégin	Nominated	
Jutra Awards	2010	Best Makeup	Bruno Gatien; Sophie Lebeau; Mélanie Rodrigue	Nominated	
Méliès International Festivals Federation	2009	Méliès d'Or	Martyrs	Won	
Scream Awards	2009	Best Foreign Film	Martyrs	Nominated	
Sitges Film Festival	2008	Grand Prize of European Fantasy Film: Gold	Pascal Laugier	Won	
Sitges Film Festival	2008	Best Makeup	Benoît Lestang; Adrien Morot	Won	

== Remake ==
In 2008, Laugier confirmed in an interview that he was in the middle of negotiating the rights for Martyrs to be remade in the United States by director Daniel Stamm. The producer attached at the time, who had previously produced Twilight (2008), indicated that Kristen Stewart was being sought to star in the film, though her involvement with the project was later denied by Stamm. Stamm said "[The original film] is very nihilistic. The American approach [that I'm looking at] would go through all that darkness but then give a glimmer of hope. You don't have to shoot yourself when it's over."

In a 2014 interview, Stamm revealed he had left the project after the budget had been reduced, stating, "I think they're now back to making the movie for like $1 million, really low budget, which I think you could almost do, it's just there's this philosophy in Hollywood that you can never go back budget-wise. As a filmmaker you are judged by that. And then there's also this concept I was unaware of called plateauing, where if you're a filmmaker who makes two movies in the same budget bracket, that becomes your thing. You are the guy for the $3 million movie, and then that's all you do. And so my agents wouldn't let me do the $1 million movie, because then that's it for you, you'll supposedly never get that bigger budget".

In February 2015, the new production companies Blumhouse Productions and The Safran Company announced that the film was already filmed and that the Goetz Brothers, Michael and Kevin, had directed. In the leads stars Bailey Noble, Troian Bellisario, Kate Burton and Blake Robbins.

When asked about the remake, Laugier responded, "I had a bad contract, I didn't even get paid for it! That's really the only thing I regret in my career: That my name is now associated with such a junk film and I didn't even get a cent for it! I tried to watch it but only got through 20 minutes. It was like watching my mother get raped! Then I stopped. Life is too short. In the American system, a movie like Martyrs is just not possible – they saw my movie and then turned it into something completely uninteresting."

== Legacy ==
Several publications have named Martyrs one of the greatest horror films of all time: In October 2017, IGN ranked it number 32 in a list of 100 films, with critic Marty Sliva writing: "Few horror movies elicit as extreme a physical reaction quite like 2008's Martyrs... the film transforms into a bizarre religious gore-fest that draws a link between spiritual enlightenment and utterly brutal physical and emotional torture. It’s tough to keep your eyes set on the horrifying images that unfold on-screen, but for those willing to dive into its heady themes, it’s even harder to look away."

In 2021, Rolling Stone also ranked it number 36 in their list of the greatest horror films made in the 21st century. Complex Networks and The A.V. Club have ranked it on their lists as the most disturbing films of all time. In 2024, IndieWire named it the scariest horror film of the 2000s.

It has also proven to be influence on several other projects; notably, the film was a strong influence on Glen Schofield when developing Dead Space. When making his 2019 film Us, Jordan Peele had star Lupita Nyong'o watch Martyrs, in addition to nine other horror films, in preparation for her dual roles.

== See also ==
- List of films featuring home invasions
- New French Extremity

== Sources ==
- Collins, Brian H. (2013). "A Voice and Something More: Jigsaw as Acousmêtre and Existential Guru". In Aston, James; Walliss, John (eds.). To See the Saw Movies: Essays on Torture Porn and Post-9/11 Horror. Jefferson, North Carolina: McFarland. pp. 86–104. ISBN 978-1-476-60380-3.
- Desport, Matthieu (2009). Martyrs: Chroniques organiques (Documentary film). Eskwad and TCB Film.
- Foster, Gwendolyn Audrey (2014). Hoarders, Doomsday Preppers, and the Culture of Apocalypse. New York City, New York: Palgrave Macmillan. ISBN 978-1-137-46808-6.
- Kerner, Aaron (2016). Extreme Cinema: Affective Strategies in Transnational Media. Edinburgh, Scotland: Edinburgh University Press. ISBN 978-1-474-40291-0.
- McPhee, Ruth (2016). Female Masochism in Film: Sexuality, Ethics and Aesthetics. New York City, New York: Routledge. ISBN 978-1-317-13600-2.
- Muir, John Kenneth (2023). Horror Films of 2000–2009. Jefferson, North Carolina: McFarland. ISBN 978-1-476-64450-9.
- West, Alexandra (2016). Films of the New French Extremity: Visceral Horror and National Identity. Jefferson, North Carolina: McFarland. ISBN 978-1-476-62511-9.
