= Eden Log =

- Theatrical release poster
- Directed by: Franck Vestiel
- Written by: Franck Vestiel; Pierre Bordage
- Produced by: Cédric Jimenez
- Starring: Clovis Cornillac; Vimala Pons
- Cinematography: Thierry Pouget
- Edited by: Nicolas Sarkissian
- Music by: Seppuku Paradigm
- Production company: Impéria Films
- Distributed by: BAC Films
- Release date: 26 December 2007 (France)
- Running time: 101 minutes
- Country: France
- Language: French

Eden Log is a 2007 French science fiction horror film directed and co-written by Franck Vestiel. The film was Vestiel's first as a director, who shot the entire film using only hand-held cameras.

Reviews towards the film were mixed, which received an aggregated score of 43% from Rotten Tomatoes. In North America, it premiered at the Toronto International Film Festival on September 11, 2008.

== Synopsis ==
A man wakes up disoriented, deep inside a cave. Suffering amnesia, he has no recollection of who he is, or how he got there. A dead man lies next to him. As he stumbles around in the limited light, he comes upon a dilapidated area with damaged pieces of technology all around him. A registration plays, explaining the place is a sort of processing network called Eden Log, whose workers are all immigrants promised citizenship in the society above ground. The workers are apparently harvesting the sap of a gigantic plant whose roots and vines are now everywhere in the underground complex, which appears abandoned.

While trying to reach the surface, the man comes upon a bearded stranger pinned against the wall by the protruding vines that are slowly taking over his body. The stranger, in great pain and sounding deranged, tells the man he is the creator of the entire system, and then warns him about an unseen menace. A growling noise approaches and the man loses consciousness.

Upon waking up, the man keeps going up, passing throughout areas increasingly better-lit. He retrieves more recordings, revealing that one of the network technicians refused to give access to security personnel. It becomes clear that some kind of revolt was started by the workers over the conditions in the network. As a result, the corporate overlords ordered the security forces to forcibly take control of the network levels and seal the area.

The man climbs up to Level -3, where he overhears some security personnel talk about their orders to capture "the architect". They also have what looks like a mutated human chained up, and it is revealed that a significant amount of the worker population have changed into mutants.

On Level -2, the man ends up in a small laboratory, which is suddenly surrounded by mutants. A figure in a protective suit uses a bright light and loud noise to scare the mutants away, then knocks the man out and restrains him, fearing he is infected as well. The figure, being one of Eden Log's botanists, explains the goal of the entire structure is to generate power from the sap of the living plant at the center of the network. However, at some point the plant has started to react, triggering the mutation. The botanist conducts a test on the man, connecting briefly with the plant, but surprisingly, the man seems to be able to reverse the corruption process, causing the seemingly sterile plant to sprout and become lush with growth.

Shortly after, the mutants resume their assault on the botanist's lab, and the botanist flees, leaving the man behind. After escaping a mutant, the man catches up with the botanist, who is revealed to be a woman. The two are now on an elevator, and during their ascension, the man is suddenly overwhelmed by a sexual urge, that quickly degenerates to the point that he brutally rapes the botanist. She is traumatized, but the man seems to have lost control of himself only temporarily, due to the peculiar sort of mutation he is experiencing. He realizes he had killed the architect as well, before blacking out.

The botanist agrees to follow the man, despite being still wary of him. Together, the two traverse several tunnels, and eventually stumble upon the location of a technician who merged with the plant to stop the mutation. Fending off the mutants, they reach the sap collector at Level -1. The botanist sees white cubes with human workers inside, and realizes that is where the infected are stored, not to be cured but to be exploited for energy themselves: the dangerous "secret" the corporate woman from the registrations had alluded to.

The botanist begins convulsing and realizes she had been infected by the man when he raped her. She tosses him a final data chip with recordings, then runs away, back into the tunnels.

Proceeding upward, the man emerges in a chamber that he seems to recognize. He sneaks into a surveillance room and begins watching the videos and piecing all the information together, finally rediscovering his own identity: his name is Tolbiac and is the commander of the security force tasked to quell the rebellion. After being infected, he killed in a rage the guard who was with him, losing his memory afterwards. The computer system now confirms his mission was successful, having killed the architect, stopped the revolt, and recovered all the data from the technicians. A group of guards enter the room and, upon recognizing their chief, stand by waiting for orders.

On the surface, Tolbiac is saluted by Eden Log's corporate people for protecting the company's secrets as he stands in front of an animated board depicting the full process of the power harvesting procedure: the immigrant workers are purposely sent to the lowest levels, given sap to energize them, then work until they are depleted or dead as their energy is harvested to power the city above; this is society's way to "integrate" the immigrant populations.

Tolbiac decides to break this cycle of exploitation, as he walks into the tree's main chamber and plugs himself in, causing the plant to undergo explosive growth, which destroys the power plant and causes a full blackout in the surrounding city and denying the means for the corporation to exploit the immigrants ever again. The tree's growth overruns the city, while a single tear falls down from Tolbiac's eye.

== Cast ==
- Clovis Cornillac as Tolbiac
- Vimala Pons as the botanist
- Zohar Wexler as the last technician
- Sifan Shao as the rebel technician
- Arben Bajraktaraj as the architect

== Production ==
The film was Franck Vestiel's first as a director. Eden Log uses a muted palette. The film is shot with only hand-held cameras in underground locations 60 feet (18 m) below the surface, as well as in a sewer. A gray and blue multilevel set is used in Eden Log, which, according to Vestiel, was designed to "avoid the look of the usual science fiction future [...] The last thing I wanted was for Eden Log to fall into the trap of those science fiction films where the characters live in super-sterile, bathroom-like environments. [...] And I did not want people to be able to date the film by identifying the technology, which is why I have no apparatuses, no dials, no buttons." The surrealistic landscapes of Eden Log were inspired by Vestiel's favorite films, such as Escape from New York and Dawn of the Dead, and comics and literature, such as Frank Miller's Daredevil and Métal Hurlant.

== Release ==
The film first appeared in North America at the Toronto International Film Festival, where it aired on 11 September and 13 September 2008. It was released in France on 26 December 2007.

== Festivals ==
- Grand Prix International Festival of Fantasy Film São Paulo
- Official Selection Toronto International Film Festival 2008 Midnight Madness
- Official Selection Sitges Film Festival 2008
- Official Selection Austin Film Festival 2008
- Official Selection London FrightFest Film Festival 2008
- Official Selection Brussels International Fantastic Film Festival 2008
- Official Selection Fantasy Filmfest Germany 2008
- Official Selection Trieste International Science Fiction Film Festival 2008
- Official Selection Melbourne International Film Festival 2009

== Reception ==
Eden Log receives an aggregated score of 43% from Rotten Tomatoes, based on seven reviews. The Toronto International Film Festival described the film as a "stunning sci-fi vision", in which Vestiel "created a decaying universe for his bewildered yet resourceful hero to explore". They noted that Eden Log appears to have been influenced by role-playing games and the works of Luc Besson, Marc Caro, Jean-Pierre Jeunet, and Darren Aronofsky, as well as channeling the "rich visual history of French comics, or bandes dessinées, from magazines like Métal Hurlant and its American counterpart, Heavy Metal". Chris Cabin of Film Critic credited the film for its first 20 minutes of attention-grabbing action, but notes that the journey that Tolbiac takes is "more suited that of a video game programmer than a young filmmaker". Cabin wrote that the film does not emotionally connect with the viewer, and he gave the film 1.5 out of 5 stars. Variety remarked that the film is "bold", despite rehashing some cinematic qualities and sound design, concluding that the film "the most bang for limited bucks, with an eye-popping finale".
