= Red Nights =

2010 Hong Kong-French-Belgian film by Julien Carbon and Laurent Courtiaud

- Directed by: Julien Carbon; Laurent Courtiaud
- Written by: Julien Carbon; Laurent Courtiaud
- Produced by: Alexis Dantec; Rita Wu
- Starring: Frédérique Bel; Carrie Ng; Jack Kao
- Cinematography: Man-Ching Ng
- Edited by: Sébastien Prangère
- Music by: Alex Cortés; Willie Cortés
- Production companies: The French Connection; Red East Pictures
- Release date: 2010
- Running time: 98 minutes
- Countries: Hong Kong; France; Belgium
- Languages: French; Cantonese

Red Nights (Les Nuits rouges du Bourreau de Jade) is a 2010 giallo slasher film directed by Julien Carbon and Laurent Courtiaud. A Hong Kong-French-Belgian co-production, it is a thriller and a tale of erotic horror. The filmmakers call it a Hong Kong giallo with mystery, (sadistic) murders, fetishism and women. The film played at the 2010 Toronto International Film Festival in the Midnight Madness section.

== Plot ==
There is a legend of an executioner who created a poison which brought death through absolute pleasure. This legend repeats nowadays when a French woman flees to Hong Kong after killing her lover and stealing from him an old artifact containing this poison. She meets a mobster from Taiwan and an epicurean and sadistic woman killer, who all want to get the precious poison.

== Cast ==
- Frédérique Bel as Catherine Trinquier
- Carrie Ng as Carrie Chan
- Carole Brana as Sandrine Lado
- Stefan Wong as Patrick
- Kotone Amamiya as Tulip
- Maria Chen as Flora
- Jack Kao as Mister Ko
