= Deliver Us from Evil (1969 film) =

1969 Canadian drama film

- French: Délivrez-nous du mal
- Directed by: Jean-Claude Lord
- Written by: Jean-Claude Lord
- Based on: Délivrez-nous du mal by Claude Jasmin
- Starring: Yvon Deschamps; Guy Godin; Catherine Bégin; Olivette Thibault
- Cinematography: Claude Charron
- Edited by: Jean-Claude Lord
- Music by: François Dompierre
- Production company: Coopératio
- Distributed by: France Film
- Release date: July 4, 1969 (Théâtre Saint-Denis)
- Running time: 82 minutes
- Country: Canada
- Language: French

Deliver Us from Evil (French: Délivrez-nous du mal) is a 1969 Canadian drama film, written, directed, and edited by Jean-Claude Lord. One of the first Canadian films ever to address the subject of homosexuality, the film was produced and shot in 1965 but remained unreleased until 1969 due to its sensitive subject matter.

The film centres on the emotionally complex and abusive relationship between André (Yvon Deschamps), a gay man, and Georges (Guy Godin), a bisexual man who was also formerly romantically involved with André's sister Lucille (Catherine Bégin). When a vacation at a hotel ends with Georges having sex with a woman, André is driven to attempt both suicide and murder because of his inability to secure Georges' affections.

The film was not well received by critics, and has subsequently been heavily criticized as a "sordid" film that relies too heavily on outdated stereotypes of homosexual men. The film's representation of gay identity was most prominently analyzed by Thomas Waugh in a 1981 article for the magazine Copie Zéro.

Due to its controversial reception, following its premiere the film was not widely seen until a restored print was screened at Montreal's Fantasia Film Festival in 2016.
