= Baby Blood =

1990 French horror film

- French theatrical release poster
- Directed by: Alain Robak
- Written by: Alain Robak; Serge Cukier
- Produced by: Ariel Zeitoun; Joelle Malberg; Irene Sohm
- Starring: Emmanuelle Escourrou; Jean-François Gallotte; Christian Sinniger; Francois Frapier
- Cinematography: Bernard Nechet
- Music by: Carlos Acciari
- Production companies: Partner's Productions; Exo 7 Productions
- Distributed by: Pushkar Films
- Release date: 24 January 1990
- Running time: 84 minutes
- Country: France
- Language: French

Baby Blood is a 1990 French horror film directed and co-written by Alain Robak, and starring Emmanuelle Escourrou and Jean-François Galotte. Its plot follows a former circus performer who is driven to commit murders and consume blood by an ancient parasite that has invaded her womb.

The film was shown at the Avoriaz Fantasy Film Festival and the Sarasota French Film Festival in 1990. At Avoriaz, it became the first film to win a Jury Award despite not being in competition. In the United States, Dimension Films acquired home media distribution rights, releasing it directly-to-video in 1994 under the alternate title The Evil Within. In 2008, a sequel to the film was released titled Lady Blood.

== Plot ==
In June 1991 in northern France, a cheetah arrives by cargo ship from Africa, where it is acquired by a local circus overseen by the abusive Lohman. Before the circus can begin training the cheetah, it is found dead in its cage one night, its body inexplicably burst open. Unbeknownst to Lohman, an ancient serpent-like parasite living in the cheetah has escaped, and it crawls into the uterus of Yanka, a young performer in Lohman's act, while she is sleeping.

One month later, Yanka has escaped the carnival and is squatting in a derelict building in a nearby city. Lohman tracks her there, but Yanka, who is now telepathically communicating with the parasite, and whose body is partly controlled by it, violently murders him with a knife. The parasite urges Yanka to begin drinking blood, which it claims will help it grow and reach birth, at which point Yanka is to release it into the sea, from where it originates. When the parasite directs Yanka to murder a vagrant and drink his blood, she instead unsuccessfully attempts suicide by trying to drown herself in a river.

Some time later, Yanka arrives in Paris and begins working as a waitress, where she catches the eye of Richard, a man who becomes quickly enamored of her. The two begin a romance, as Yanka continues to murder civilians at the parasite's order. When Richard suggests he and Yanka marry and have children, she, under the influence of the parasite, murders him. Rosette, her jealous coworker who is attracted to Richard, arrives at Yanka's apartment and finds Richard's body, causing Yanka to flee.

Six months later, a visibly pregnant Yanka has taken a job as a taxi driver. One night, she is compelled by the parasite to drive over a jogger and feast on his blood. When she begins to sense she is going into labor, Yanka murders several other civilians, and is ordered by the parasite to steal a mobile blood donation van. Yanka steals the vehicle with a blood donor still inside, incapacitating him, and begins to drive toward the ocean. The parasite explains to her that it must retreat to the ocean where it can evolve, and eventually replace humankind in fifty billion years. The donor regains consciousness and attacks Yanka, causing her to crash the van.

Police arrive at the scene and Yanka is rushed by ambulance toward the nearest hospital, but a medic confirms she has already died en route. The parasite, sensing Yanka's body is dying, manages to restart her heart. Yanka returns to life and murders both the medic and the ambulance driver. In the back of the ambulance, Yanka gives birth to a normal-looking baby boy, and is disturbed to find that the telepathic connection the two had during her pregnancy has been severed. Yanka steals another motorist's truck. At a rest area, the parasite kills a hitchhiker while Yanka is trying to get a mechanic's attention and escapes the infant's body, leaving behind its skin.

Yanka abandons the truck and boards a bus of football players headed to Le Havre, which she suspects the parasite has covertly boarded. Yanka tries to warn the passengers who taunt and molest her, only to find moments later that the parasite, revealing its true form, has burrowed through the head of the driver. Yanka intentionally crashes the van, causing it to explode. At dawn, the parasite retreats into the ocean.

== Cast ==
- Emmanuelle Escourrou as Yanka
- Christian Sinniger as Lohman
- Jean-François Gallotte as Richard
- Roselyne Geslot as Rosette, the cashier
- François Frappier as Leopard Deliveryman
- Thierry Le Portier as Le dompteur
- Rémy Roubakha as Passenger in Taxi
- Eric Averlant as Driver of Car
- Alain Robak as Voice of Monster (as Roger Placenta) (Note: In the English dubbed version of the film, Gary Oldman provides the voice of the parasite.)
- Alain Chabat as Passerby
- Jacques Audiard as Jogger
- Jean-Claude Romer as Howling Man
- Jean-Yves Lafesse as the truck driver
- Yann Piquer as the homeless man
- Anne Singer as the hotel woman

== Production ==
Baby Blood was directed by Alain Robak who found that interest in films of the fantastique genre had increased in France and so desired to make a film in this style as he was a fan of b-movies. Despite proposing a low budget, Robak initially had trouble finding producers to back the film, but he received help when he became associated with producer Ariel Zeitoun.

Baby Blood began shooting on 16 May 1989 in Paris, France. The film was shot in five weeks. To save money, the circus in the film was a real circus located in Nanterre. The film's special effects were coordinated by Benoît Lestang and Jean-Marc Toussaint. The film features cameos from Jean-Yves Lafesse, Alain Chabat and Jacques Audiard. Robak got them to be in the film by simply asking them. Chabat had not been in films previously. Audiard agreed as he was friends with the filmmaker who created Baxter (1989). The film also has a cameo of Baxter the dog from the previously mentioned film. In the English-dubbed version, Gary Oldman provides the voice of fetus monster.

== Release ==
The film was shown at the Avoriaz International Fantasy Film Festival in January 1990 and the Sarasota French Film Festival in November 1990. At Avoriaz, the film was shown in competition but despite being presented out of competition, it was awarded a jury award, the first time this had happened in the festival's history.

Baby Blood was released in France on 24 January 1990. The film played for three weeks in Paris where it sold 6750 tickets in its first week. In total, it sold 10381 tickets in Paris. In 2008, a sequel to the film was released titled Lady Blood.

=== Home media ===
In France, the film was released on VHS by Fil à Film in 1992, and on DVD in 2004 with a trailer and interview with the director.

In the United States, a Region 1 DVD of Baby Blood was released by Anchor Bay Entertainment on 10 October 2006. On 8 October 2019, Kino Lorber released the film on Blu-ray, On 29 October 2024, Kino Lorber issued a newly-restored 4K UHD Blu-ray edition through their Kino Cult line.

The film was released on DVD in Japan in 2014 with French audio and Japanese subtitles, and on DVD and Blu-ray in Germany in 2019. The German release included German subtitles, audio commentary, a booklet, interviews, short films and a trailer.

In the United Kingdom, the film received its first release on 6 October 2025, when StudioCanal issued it on Blu-ray, 4K UHD and digital as part of its Cult Classics line. The release used a 4K scan of the original 35 mm camera negative.

== Reception ==
Baby Blood was called "one of those hard-to-find splatter gems" by Steve Barton of Dread Central, who further opined that it was "one of those movies that will make you constantly shake your head is disbelief" and "another fine addition to your horror loving library" before giving it a score of 3½/5. Film Threat's Steve Anderson commended the film's "unsettling" ending and the way it employed splatter and gore, and concluded, "Some genuine shocks combine with an overall pervasive creepiness to yield a movie that's quite solidly put together." Neil Lumbard of Blu-ray.com, while highly critical of the film's "awful" and "cringe-worthy" plot and dialogue, praised other aspects of it like the cinematography, score, and acting, and gave it an overall grade of 4/5, writing, "Somehow the terrible screenplay didn't prevent director Alain Robak from making an effective horror film as it manages to succeed as a brooding and gory experience with an interesting visual flair and a fitting lead performance by Emmanuelle Escourrou."

In 2025, the British Film Institute included Baby Blood in its list of "10 great French horror films".

== Legacy ==
Baby Blood has retrospectively been regarded as an early precursor to later French extreme horror. The British Film Institute described it as an "ur-child of the New French Extremity", citing its combination of body horror, graphic violence and themes surrounding pregnancy and gender. The Wexner Center for the Arts similarly described the film as a forerunner of modern French feminist body horror films such as Raw (2016) and Titane (2021).

A sequel, Lady Blood, was released in 2008. Actress Emmanuelle Escourrou, who reprised the role of Yanka, said that the project originated after she was interviewed for a DVD release of Baby Blood, prompting her to consider what had become of the character seventeen years later and begin developing a sequel.

== See also ==
- Reproduction and pregnancy in speculative fiction
- Parasitism

== Sources ==
- Muir, John Kenneth (2011). Horror Films of the 1990s. Jefferson, North Carolina: McFarland. ISBN 978-0-7864-4012-2.
- Lukeman, Adam (2011). Fangoria's 101 Best Horror Movies You've Never Seen. Random House Digital. ISBN 978-0-307-52347-1.
