= Revenge of the Living Dead Girls =

- La revanche des mortes vivantes
- Directed by: Pierre B. Reinhard
- Written by: Jean-Claude Roy
- Produced by: Jean-Claude Roy
- Starring: Véronique Catanzaro; Kathryn Charly; Sylvie Novak; Anthea Wyler; Laurence Mercier; Patrick Guillemin; Gabor Rassov; Christina Schmidt; Cornélia Wilms
- Cinematography: Henry Frogers
- Music by: Christopher Reid
- Release date: 16 September 1987 (France)
- Running time: 95 minutes
- Country: France
- Language: French

Revenge of the Living Dead Girls (French: La revanche des mortes vivantes) is a 1987 French splatter film directed by Pierre B. Reinhard, written by Jean-Claude Roy, and starring Véronique Catanzaro, Kathryn Charly, Sylvie Novak, Anthea Wyler, Laurence Mercier, Patrick Guillemin, Gabor Rassov, Christina Schmidt, and Cornélia Wilms. Toxic waste causes a zombie outbreak in France.

== Plot ==
In France, the CEO of a chemical company looks to cheaply dispose of their plant's chemical waste. He and his secretary come up with the idea to dump it illegally. When the secretary contaminates a milk tanker, it causes several deaths in the town. The toxic waste, illegally dumped in a nearby graveyard, then causes the recently dead townspeople to rise as ravenous zombies, who seek revenge on the unscrupulous company and its employees.

== Cast ==
- Véronique Catanzaro
- Kathryn Charly
- Sylvie Novak
- Anthea Wyler
- Laurence Mercier
- Patrick Guillemin
- Gabor Rassov
- Christina Schmidt
- Cornélia Wilms

== Release ==
Revenge of the Living Dead Girls premiered in France on 16 September 1987. It was released on DVD on 8 August 2006.

== Reception ==
Dave Bow of The Portland Mercury rated it 2/4 stars and wrote that story is confused and the ending makes no sense. Peter Schorn of IGN rated it 2/10 and called it a weak ripoff of The Return of the Living Dead. Ian Jane of DVD Talk rated it 3/5 stars and called it "an entertaining slice of European sleaze".
