= Saint Ange =

2004 film by Pascal Laugier

- Theatrical release poster
- Directed by: Pascal Laugier
- Written by: Pascal Laugier
- Produced by: Christophe Gans; Richard Grandpierre; Vlad Paunescu
- Starring: Virginie Ledoyen; Catriona MacColl; Lou Doillon; Dorina Lazăr
- Cinematography: Pablo Rosso
- Edited by: Sébastien Prangère
- Music by: Joseph LoDuca
- Production company: Eskwad
- Distributed by: ARP Sélection
- Release date: 23 June 2004 (France)
- Running time: 98 minutes
- Countries: France; Romania
- Languages: French; English
- Box office: $6.8 million

Saint Ange (also known as House of Voices) is a 2004 supernatural horror film written and directed by Pascal Laugier in his feature film debut, and starring Virginie Ledoyen, Catriona MacColl, Lou Doillon, and Dorina Lazăr. The film is set 1958 at an isolated orphanage in the French Alps. A pregnant woman is hired as the new housekeeper, though most of the orphans were moved elsewhere following a recent death. The housekeeper investigates the suspicious deaths of war orphans during World War II, working with an adult orphan who has remained in the orphanage since the war.

== Plot ==
In 1958, Anna Jurin accepts a job as a housekeeper of Saint Ange, a rusty and isolated orphanage located in the French Alps and owned by Madam Francard. The last batch of children have been sent elsewhere shortly after the mysterious death of a boy in the bathroom, which tarnishes the orphanage's reputation and threatens its closure. Other than Anna, the orphanage is now populated by only two people: the long-time cook Helenka and an adult orphan, Judith, who suffers from a mental disability and claims that there are other, unseen, children in the location.

Throughout her stay, Anna experiences apparent supernatural phenomena. However, Helenka dismisses her worries as mere hallucinations, especially after she learns that Anna is pregnant due to a gang rape, a fact that she tries to hide at first. Anna learns that Judith is one of the many sent to Saint Ange in 1946 as a war orphan of World War II; because of shortages of supplies and logistics, Judith is the only survivor.

Despite this explanation, Anna suspects that the orphanage deliberately killed and hid the children. She gains the trust of Judith by befriending and calming her when her kittens are apparently drowned by Helenka, enough for her to disclose that the children inhabit an area somewhere behind a mirror in the bathroom, revealed to be an abandoned dormitory. Helenka tries to prevent them from heading to the area, but Judith knocks her unconscious. The two women proceed to the dormitory and find remains of toys and rotten food. Judith realizes that the children had really died and begs Anna to stop searching, but the latter insists on continuing and boards an elevator heading to the underground. Anna arrives at a sterile, hospital-like structure with clean white walls and brightly lit lamps. She is confronted by the children who rise from a series of murky baths, who surround her. Anna goes into a sudden labor and is helped to deliver the baby by the children but the newborn infant is stillborn when the stillbirth killed Anna.

Sometime later, Francard and her assistant search for Anna in the underground, which is now damp, dark, and rust-walled. They find Anna and her baby on the floor, both dead. Deciding to leave them there, the two head upstairs to leave the premises alongside Helenka and Judith; it is implied that Anna has been hallucinating the phenomena due to the stress, as she is revealed to be the true culprit for the drowning of the kittens. However, before they leave, Judith throws away her medication, as Anna advised her earlier, and peeks into Anna's former bedroom, where she sees her and her baby, now as spirits of Saint Ange, alongside the dead children. Francard comes back for Judith and the film ends as the room is seen empty.

== Cast ==
- Virginie Ledoyen as Anna Jurin
- Lou Doillon as Judith
- Catriona MacColl as Francard
- Dorina Lazăr as Helenka
- Virginie Darmon as Mathilde
- Jérôme Soufflet as Daniel
- Marie Herry as Marie
- Éric Prat as an unnamed social services worker

== Production ==
Some thought that Virginie Ledoyen was actually five or six months pregnant during filming. The star in fact wore a prosthetic pregnancy for the shoot and spoke of the hard bodily work and physical discomfort this entailed: "We shot scenes in stifling heat, with my hair sticking to me, false blood on my face, and the latex stomach melting."

== Language ==
According to Christophe Gans, the film was shot both in French and English. The Canadian DVD has both cuts of the film.

== Release ==
In the United States, the film was acquired by Rogue Pictures, who released it directly-to-DVD under the alternate title House of Voices.

== Reception ==
=== Box office ===
Saint Ange grossed $6.8 million internationally.

=== Critical response ===
Lisa Nesselson of Variety wrote of the film: "An incredibly stylish but ultimately hollow tour-de-force, first film by scripter-helmer Pascal Laugier is a triumph of production design and smart lensing in the service of a story that most moviegoers have already seen enough variations on to last a lifetime. A few mild shivers and the feeling that one will be hearing more from this particular talent almost make up for a tepid punchline."
