= Pascal Laugier =

French screenwriter and film director (born 1971)

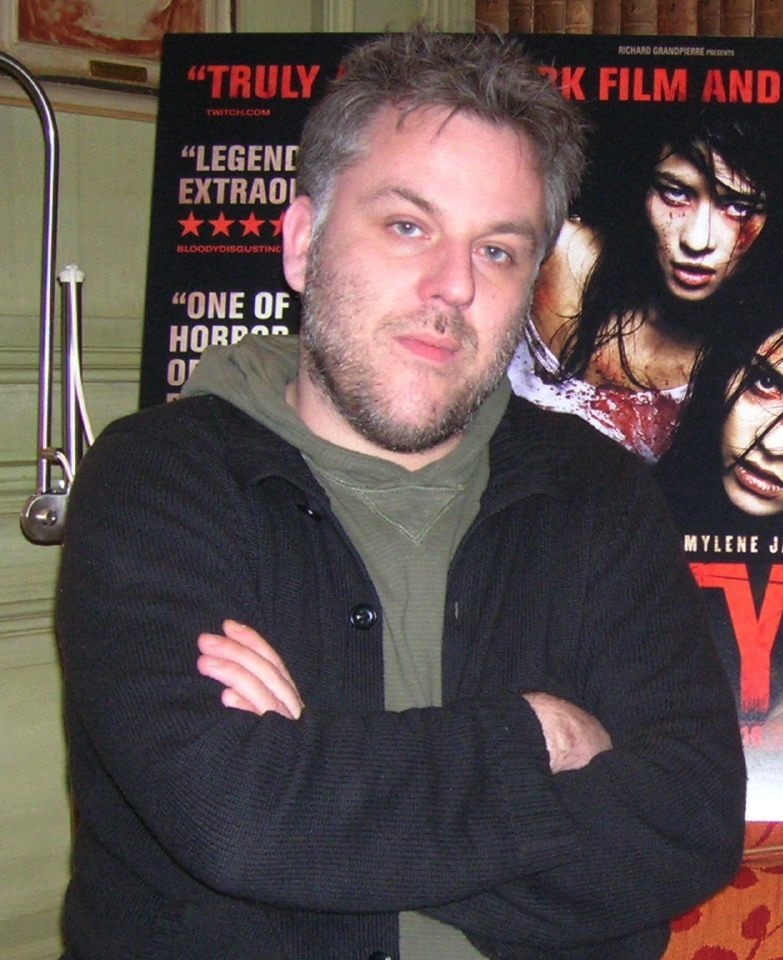
- Laugier in 2009
- Born: 16 October 1971 (age 54); Vallauris, France
- Occupations: Film director, screenwriter
- Years active: 1993–present

Pascal Laugier (French pronunciation: [paskal loʒje]; born 16 October 1971) is a French screenwriter and film director.

== Career ==
Pascal Laugier made his first major mark in the film industry with Christophe Gans' film Brotherhood of the Wolf (2001). Laugier was a gofer on the set and can briefly be seen playing the assistant to Francois Hadji-Lazaro's character. Gans had Laugier direct the "making-of" documentaries of the film.

Working with Gans led to Laughier's first feature film with Saint Ange (2004) for producers Richard Grandpierre and Gans. The film impressed Grandpierre enough to let him make another project which would develop into Martyrs (2008).

Following the film's release, the American production company Miramax asked Laugier to create a remake of Hellraiser (1987). Laugier initially agreed and spent four months working on the project but eventually left the film and worked on his English-language debut with The Tall Man (2012). Laugier wanted his Hellraiser to be very serious and explore gay S&M culture, whereas the producers wanted the film to be more commercial and appeal to a teen audience. Following the release of The Tall Man in France, Jason Blum approached Laugier to direct a sequel to the film Sinister (2012). Blum's production company Blumhouse had already produced a remake of Martyrs with Martyrs (2015), which Laugier had despised. Laugier responded that "American studios have the ability to hire us for our original vision only to ultimately insist we just be like everyone else. There can be only one person in control of a film, not ten all with different views. I played that game with Miramax and I had no intention of ever doing it again."

Potential future directing projects include a supernatural thriller entitled Details. Laugier spent two years working on a project which never developed. In that time, he directed Mylène Farmer's music video "City of Love", the teaser of which was released online in December 2015.

Inspired by three films: Rob Zombie's The Lords of Salem (2012), David Robert Mitchell's It Follows (2014) and S. Craig Zahler's Bone Tomahawk (2015) he wrote Ghostland (2018). In December 2016, while filming Ghostland, actress Taylor Hickson was told by director Laugier to bang her fists against a glass window and was repeatedly told it was safe to do so. The window then shattered and she fell on the glass, severely cutting the left side of her face. The wound required 70 stitches, which left her with permanent scarring. Subsequently, in 2019, the film's production company, Incident Productions Inc., "pleaded guilty to failing to ensure the safety and welfare of a worker under the Workplace Safety and Health Act" and was fined $40,000 by the province of Manitoba for the incident.

== Filmography ==
- Saint Ange (2004)
- Martyrs (2008)
- The Tall Man (2012)
- Ghostland (2018)
- Ils étaient dix (2020)

== Bibliography ==
- Jones, Alan (2018). Incident in a Ghostland (booklet). Arrow Video. FCD1792.
