= Street Musique =

- DVD cover for the film
- Directed by: Ryan Larkin
- Produced by: Ryan Larkin
- Music by: Rick Scott; Dick Tarnoff; Rick Stone; Rick Watson; Jim Colby; Jon Van Arsdell
- Production company: National Film Board of Canada
- Release date: 1972
- Running time: 9 minutes
- Country: Canada
- Budget: $45,734

Street Musique is a 1972 animated short film by Ryan Larkin produced by the National Film Board of Canada (NFB). It is a line animation of "music as performance", in which actions of the film's characters are choreographed to the music of street musicians.

Soon after returning from the 42nd Academy Awards in 1970, for which his animated short film Walking had been nominated, Larkin was loaned by the NFB to a Vancouver art school, where he stayed for eight months conducting animation workshops. He would travel to each student's studio to direct them, one of which was a group of street musicians. These street musicians were the origin of the idea for the film, as Larkin had stated that "they would make a great focal point for my abstract images".

One of the figures in the film

The film consists of five or six vaguely defined segments whose animation matches the pace of the music to which it is set. It begins with a photograph of a musician that is replaced by a line drawing of that photograph. A transition leads to images of a man's body transforming into abstract improvisational forms using line shading and watercolours. The figures undergo a continuous metamorphosis throughout the film. Chris Robinson stated that the film's awkward ending is indicative of Larkin's creative hesitancy, as the last image is a figure waiting for music. Larkin said that he "ran out of ideas" and "didn't know how to end the film".

The film cost $45,734 (equivalent to $318,200 in 2025) to make.

Street Musique won the Grand Prize at the Melbourne International Film Festival in 1973, which included a cash prize of A$2,500 from the Government of Victoria in Australia. The film also received the Jury's First Prize at the Berlin Film Festival of Animated Films. Larkin was fond of the Melbourne International Film Festival award because Street Musique "was a ten minute film up against all kinds of complicated feature films". He used the prize money to support young artists in Montreal, to whom he rented his nine-room apartment for CA$100.

In 2000, after having lived on the streets in Montreal and spending his nights at the Old Brewery Mission, Larkin met Chris Robinson. During a discussion, Larkin told Robinson that after creating Street Musique, he was bereft of ideas for new projects. Robinson invited Larkin to be a member of the selection committee for the Ottawa International Animation Festival. The other three members were Chris Landreth, Pjotr Sapegin, and Andrei Svislotksi, none of whom were aware of Larkin's identity. After reviewing selections, they screened each other's films. Larkin was last, showing Walking, Street Musique, and Syrinx. Landreth was immediately inspired to create a documentary film about Larkin's life, which became Ryan. The animated documentary incorporated in their entirety Street Musique and Walking. Larkin's character in Ryan is animated to dance with characters from Street Musique.

== Awards ==
- International Week of Animation Cinema, Barcelona: Molinillo de Oro, First Prize, Special Techniques, 1972
- Melbourne International Film Festival, Melbourne: Grand Prix – Gold Boomerang, 1973
- International Short Film Festival Oberhausen, Oberhausen: First Prize of the International Animation Film Jury, 1973
- Columbus International Film & Animation Festival, Columbus, Ohio: Chris Bronze Plaque, 1973
- FIBA International Festival of Buenos Aires, Buenos Aires: Honorable Mention, 1974

== Works cited ==
- Evans, Gary (1991). In the National Interest: A Chronicle of the National Film Board of Canada from 1949 to 1989. University of Toronto Press. ISBN 0802027849.
