= Ryan (film) =

- DVD cover
- Directed by: Chris Landreth
- Written by: Chris Landreth
- Produced by: Steven Hoban; Mark Smith; Marcy Page
- Starring: Ryan Larkin; Chris Landreth; Felicity Fanjoy; Derek Lamb
- Edited by: Allan Code
- Music by: Fergus Marsh; Michael White
- Production company: Copperheart Entertainment
- Distributed by: National Film Board of Canada
- Release date: 17 May 2004
- Running time: 14 minutes
- Country: Canada
- Language: English

Ryan is a 2004 short animated documentary film created and directed by Chris Landreth about Canadian animator Ryan Larkin, who had lived on skid row in Montreal as a result of drug and alcohol abuse. Landreth's chance meeting with Larkin in 2000 inspired him to develop the film, which took 18 months to complete. It was co-produced by Copper Heart Entertainment and the National Film Board of Canada (NFB), and its creation and development is the subject of the NFB documentary Alter Egos. The film incorporated material from archive sources, particularly Larkin's works at the NFB.

The film is an animated interpretation of an interview of Larkin by Landreth, and includes interviews with Larkin's previous partner and coworkers, as well as Landreth. Development of the characters was partially inspired by the plastinated human bodies of the Body Worlds exhibition. The distorted and disembodied appearance of the film's characters is based on Landreth's use of psychological realism to portray emotion visually, and expression is modelled by use of straight ahead animation. The animation was created at the Animation Arts Centre of Seneca College in Toronto. Some of the animation was based on cords, mathematical equations modelling the physical properties of curves and used to animate filamentous objects in the film. The visual effects of the film has been described by reviewers and film critics as difficult to describe and having a distinctive visceral style.

Ryan won over 60 awards, including the 2004 Oscar for Best Animated Short Film and the 25th Genie Award for Best Animated Short. It was presented and won awards at many film festivals, including Cannes Film Festival, San Francisco International Film Festival, and Worldwide Short Film Festival. It also won Jury awards at SIGGRAPH and the Annecy International Animated Film Festival, and an honourable mention at the Sundance Film Festival.

As a result of the film's popularity, Larkin became famous once again and received requests for his animation services. He began work with Laurie Gordon on an animated film Spare Change about his panhandling on the streets of Montreal, and created several bumpers for MTV Canada. Larkin died in 2007, and Spare Change was completed by Gordon and released in 2008. Landreth received offers to produce feature films, but instead chose to continue producing animated short films, releasing The Spine in 2009.

== Background ==
Larkin was a Canadian animator who had worked at the National Film Board of Canada in the 1960s and 1970s, producing several celebrated works. Best known for his film Walking composed of animated vignettes of people walking, Larkin was considered one of the best animators of his generation. In 1969, the Montreal Gazette referred to him as the "Frank Zappa or George Harrison of animation". In the 1970s, unable to cope with his success and the pressure to develop more works, and facing a creative block, he became addicted to alcohol and cocaine. By 1978, he was broke and no longer working for the NFB. He worked as a commercial animator and painter for the next ten years, but by the late 1980s he was living on the streets of Montreal. He continued to draw and sculpt.

Chris Robinson first learned of Larkin in 2000 after his name was mentioned in a discussion by staff member Lesya Fesiak, who had heard about Larkin panhandling in Montreal from a friend. Fesiak and Robinson, who is the director of the Ottawa International Animation Festival, drove to Montreal to meet Larkin in June 2000, where they found him panhandling near Schwartz's on Saint Laurent Boulevard. At the time, he resided at the Old Brewery Mission and spent his days "wandering around town" visiting art galleries, museums, and libraries. He always had a notepad with him for drawing. They offered him dinner at a nearby bar, where he recounted his life story, which Robinson found "comical and heartbreaking, pathetic and inspiring". Before leaving, Robinson invited Larkin to Ottawa to watch a few entries for that year's film festival.

Landreth met Larkin at the suggestion of Robinson. Landreth had been taking part in the festival's selection committee when a fourth member of the committee dropped out. Robinson asked Larkin to take the missing committee member's place, and personally drove him to Ottawa in July 2000. Committee members Landreth, Pjotr Sapegin, and Andrei Svislotksi, in addition to Larkin, reviewed the commissioned films competition entries. Nobody on the selection committee knew of Larkin's identity at the time, and Landreth found his presence on the committee to be odd. Committee members were only told about Larkin's identity at the end of the viewings, when they screened each other's films. Larkin was last, showing Walking, Street Musique, and Syrinx. Landreth later described his surprise, and stated "I looked at him and wondered, how did this happen?"

Landreth, at the time employed by Alias, was "immediately inspired" to create a film based on Larkin's life, but waited a few months before acting on it. He met Larkin again in September during the Ottawa International Animation Festival, and asked him if he would agree to be the subject of a film. Larkin agreed, and on 13 February 2001, Landreth decided to make the film.

== Development ==
Landreth spent several years developing the film. Instead of first creating a storyboard on which the animation would be based, he conceived the theme after interviews with Larkin. After the screenplay was developed, the production followed a more typical process of creating a storyboard, character modelling, scene design, animation, and post-production.

In February 2001, Landreth contacted producer Steven Hoban at Copper Heart Entertainment. Hoban liked the concept for the film, and wanted to include it as a 3D rendering in the IMAX film CyberWorld he was producing. A manager rejected the idea, as the subject material was deemed to be inappropriate for CyberWorld's young target audience.

A production team was assembled with Copper Heart Entertainment, and it received a grant from the Canada Council for the Arts. The National Film Board of Canada agreed to be a co-producer. Landreth also secured studio space at the Animation Arts Centre of Seneca College in Toronto, and in 2003 four graduates and fifteen undergraduates from its 3D Animation program were recruited to work on the film. The core development team consisted of one computer graphics supervisor, four animators, one texture mapper, one renderer, two set modellers, and a few character modellers.

In the summer of 2001, he conducted several interviews with Larkin, who gave Landreth carte blanche for the project. Landreth accumulated about 20 hours of audio footage, but did not think it was sufficient material on which to base a story, so in August he interviewed him again, this time asking about his alcoholism. Larkin, who had been drinking throughout the interview, responded angrily, and this would become the "climactic moment in the film". This led Landreth to change the production from a story primarily narrated by Larkin to an interview-style cinéma vérité documentary in which Landreth's character had a larger role.

Landreth acquired a comprehensive set of Larkin's works from the National Film Board of Canada and other reference material. He also conducted interviews with Felicity Fanjoy, who had been Larkin's girlfriend in the past, and Derek Lamb, who directed films at the NFB and was a producer for Larkin in the 1970s. He used the interviews and reference material to create a script, which he completed by December.

The animation used the technique of psychological realism, blending dialogue from interviews with subjective screen characters who are "sometimes fragmented, distorted, or in some way unusual". The representation of the characters was partly inspired by Body Worlds, a travelling exhibition of human bodies preserved by plastination to reveal internal anatomical structures.

Landreth has stated that Larkin's character in the film is a subjective interpretation based on his own ideology and experiences, citing one of his favourite quotations "we don't see things as they are, we see things as we are". He animated Larkin as a beaten character "battered by years of substance abuse and still bearing the scars of his artistic failure". Landreth stated that the visual appearance of the characters "reflect pain, insanity, fear, mercy, shame, and creativity", and that the effect was to show the characters' "souls or mental states or psyches".

Landreth incorporated Larkin's alcoholism as part of the narrative of the film, at first in the background as Larkin sips from a thermos, and later directly as Landreth asks Larkin about his alcoholism. The attention to Larkin's alcoholism also reflects Landreth's mother's troubles with alcohol.

Pre-production and production took about 18 months. Use of the Seneca College computing infrastructure, which was loaned for free for the production, was valued by NFB producer Marcy Page at about CA$250,000. Intel donated the use of a render farm for the production. The overall cost to produce Ryan was about CA$900,000.

The film was dedicated to Landreth's mother, Barbara.

== Animation ==
The cafeteria appears to have been rendered by nonlinear projection when viewed from a linear perspective camera

The animation consists of three-dimensional avatars representing the interview subjects, each "mutilated and deformed in ways expressive of emotional and artistic trauma". The film uses emotional realism instead of photorealism, using graphic elements to represent the characters' state of mind. There is a shift between techniques throughout the animation, particularly the use of hand-drawn vectors, rotoscoping, and 3D rendering of characters and the environments in which they are set. The setting is a dilapidated cafeteria in which the characters representing Larkin and Landreth are seated across from each other at a table. It was chosen to bring the characters into one setting for interaction, instead of having to deal with multiple settings. It also provides a neutral setting with a relaxed atmosphere to mitigate any initial bias toward the characters. In some scenes, colour correction was used to "achieve a dark mood".

Incorporated into the film in their entirety are two of Larkin's most famous animated shorts, Walking and the 1972 line animation Street Musique. As Larkin's character dances with one of the characters from Street Musique, stroboscoping arms are shown, an homage to Pas de deux by Norman McLaren, Larkin's mentor at the NFB. An animated rendering of Larkin attending the 42nd Academy Awards in 1970 is also included.

Animators were required to present a "continuously varying viewpoint" using distortion effects on a linear perspective camera. Each object in the three-dimensional scene had to be independently specified, and frame composition had to be independent of the projection. Three types of projection systems were used for the production of Ryan: perspective linear projection for lines converging at a common vanishing point, parallel linear projection for objects to maintain "parallel line relationships", and nonlinear projection for curvilinear distortion of nearby objects. The latter was defined by the viewing and projection transformations of the cameras and spatial weight functions applied to each camera. Included in the model was support for independent manipulation of two-dimensional transformations, particularly for changing an object's translation, rotation, and scaling. The model was then incorporated into Maya for animation using scene geometry deformation. This would render "multiple simultaneous projections and camera angles" to a single frame. The nonlinear projections were also used to establish a "cinematic mood" for the setting.

=== Software and algorithms ===
The coloured threads wrapped around Chris Landreth's character's face were animated using algorithms created by the Mathematics of Information Technology and Complex Systems

The students at Seneca College used eight workstations with "the latest 3D digital technology". The Maya software by Alias (now part of Autodesk) was used for 3D modeling, rigging, lighting, rendering, and animation. The brushes smear, blur, and erase were used extensively to create the psychological realism effects of the film. Landreth stated that Maya was chosen because of its paint effects, which were an integral part of the film.

Discreet Combustion was used for compositing and all 2D computer graphics. According to lead compositor Belma Abdicevic, the frequently used compositing tools were paint, colour correction, and motion blur. Adobe Photoshop was used for painting and texture mapping, and Adobe Premiere was used for creative development and editing.

Landreth contacted Mathematics of Information Technology and Complex Systems (MITACS), a network funded by the Government of Canada, to create algorithms for digitally modelling and rendering hair. The MITACS team, headed by computer science associate professor Karan Singh of the University of Toronto, created a mathematical formula known as a cord, which is used to represent the physical characteristics of animated curves. The cord was based on a cubic function with uniform parametrization. This cord enables rope-like objects, such as hair, string, or wire, to "behave intuitively" when rendered in animation, preserving "length, elasticity and stiffness". Implemented using Maya, cords could be generated by defining a guide curve, a parametric curve in space, which the software would then follow to create an analytic, continuous shape wrapping around scene geometry. Singh was the software research and development director for the film. The MITACS team also executed all technical scripting and programming for the animation.

=== Characters ===
Although it appears to be live action, all aspects of character movement are rendered animations conceived for the film, and are not based on motion capture. Patrick Louguet and Fabien Maheu state that the characters are brought to life as disembodied, skinned, and broken. The characters have faces that are "dissipated and decimated", representing each individual's personal demons, and temporary protrusions from the head represent emotions. Larkin's character is presented as incomplete and fragile, and is the "most ravaged of all the characters".

About half of the facial animation was performed by Landreth, and the other half by the Seneca College students. Character expression and gesture was modelled using straight ahead animation, which was used to avoid the cartoonish style of "one gesture per accent of dialogue" in pose-to-pose animation. Landreth chose this style after having studied anatomy and biomechanics, and a body's expression of emotion, such as finger movements and facial expressions. The expression of Larkin's character changes from nostalgia, joy, anger, anxiety, nervousness, defensiveness, and passivity during the film. The thermos is imbued with character, persistently demanding Larkin's attention, who submits to it compulsively. The settings also exhibit character, morphing at times reflecting the state of mind of the primary characters.

Landreth directed the animators to use graph editing rather than the exposure sheets typically used in 2D animation. The latter enable an animator to "break down the individual motions in a character", but Landreth preferred an approach that did not involve characters moving in curves. He wanted the characters to portray realistic motion, which begins with an abrupt twitch for a muscle contraction and must also account for momentum and mass. For example, Landreth stated that an individual's arm should be slightly in front of the body, at 30 degrees with respect to the "scapular plane of the skeleton".

Cords are used to animate coloured threads that wrap themselves around the character's heads, and are used metaphorically in the film to represent Landreth's fear of failure and Larkin's loss of creativity. The use of coloured threads is explained by Landreth's character in first-person narrative at the beginning of the film as metaphorically representing emotional scars and frustrations. Landreth's character is rendered so that a halo appears above his head "when he gets too sanctimonious". Other characters appear when mentioned by Larkin, rendered as three-dimensional interpretations of Larkin's sketches.

=== Soundtrack ===
The soundtrack consists of audio from previously recorded interviews, and uses a technique employed in the development of Aardman Animation's 1989 film Creature Comforts. It uses character action to reveal "the half-truths and self-deceptions of the dialogue". Throughout, Landreth narrates the story based on information obtained from the interviews and the archives. Landreth did not remove Larkin's stutter, a condition resultant from Larkin's cocaine use.

== Reception ==
Ryan debuted at the Cannes Film Festival on 17 May 2004, where it was well received. Its Canadian debut was at the Worldwide Short Film Festival, and it was later shown at the Ottawa International Animation Festival, for which Robinson arranged to screen Walking in the Friday night competition as a special event and for publicity. Its US premiere was at SIGGRAPH 2004 in Los Angeles.

Roger Ebert reviewed the film in his coverage of Academy Award nominees, stating that the "animation technique is dramatic, striking and wholly original" and that the "effect is hard to describe, impossible to forget". The Toronto Film Critics' Association stated that Ryan was "an historic achievement in Canadian animation". David Kehr stated in an article in The New York Times that Ryan is a "work of art that exists on its own highly original terms". F.C. Luz stated that Ryan is an example of the "new visual and narrative forms" enabled by computer-generated imagery.

Rick Baumgartner of Animation World Network described Ryan as a "3D hand-animated symphony of creativity and color" with a "visceral graphic style". M.J. Stone of The Globe and Mail stated that the film has "astonishing imagery". Ellen Besen stated that "breaking away from the one gesture per accent standard is a hallmark of Landreths approach".

Larkin had a "pained reaction to his psychorealistic portrayal", stating that he was not fond of his "skeleton image". Landreth stated that Larkin first found his character's appearance in the film disturbing, but came to like it after realizing that all the characters in the film had a "disconnected, distorted appearance".

== Accolades ==
By 2007, the film had won over 60 awards, including:

- Academy Award for Best Animated Short Film (77th Academy Awards, 2004)
- Annecy International Animated Film Festival Jury's Special Award (2004)
- CFC Worldwide Short Film Festival Best Canadian Short (2004)
- Cannes Film Festival Kodak Discovery Award (2004)
- Cannes Film Festival Canal+ Award (2004)
- Cannes Film Festival Young Critics Award Best Short Film (2004)
- Columbus International Film & Video Festival The Arts Silver Chris Award (2004)
- Cork Film Festival Audience Award for Best International Short Film (2005)
- Dok Leipzig Golden Dove, Animated Film (47th International Leipzig Festival for Documentary and Animated Film, 2004)
- Genie Award Best Animated Short (25th Genie Awards, 2005)
- ION International Animation, Games and Short Film Festival "Animation of the Year" Award (2004)
- Ottawa International Animation Festival Nelvana Grand Prix for Independent Short Film (2004)
- Prix Ars Electronica Golden Nica for Computer Animation/Visual Effects (2004)
- Puchon International Fantastic Film Festival Grand Prize for Short Film (2005)
- San Francisco International Film Festival Golden Gate Award, Animated Short (2005)
- SIGGRAPH Jury Award (2004)
- Tampere Film Festival Best Animation (2005)
- Uppsala International Short Film Festival Special Jury Prize (2004)
- Valladolid International Film Festival Golden Spike, Short Film (2004)
- Victoria Film Festival Best Short Animation (2005)

The film also received honourable mention at the 2005 Sundance Film Festival for short filmmaking. It was one of Canada's Top Ten features of 2004 compiled by the Toronto International Film Festival.

Larkin attended the Ottawa International Animation Festival, and when it was announced as the grand prize winner, accompanied Landreth to the stage and "took a bow". The NFB invited Larkin to attend the Academy Awards, but he declined the offer. The NFB sent staff to Los Angeles one month before the Academy Awards in order to promote Ryan, the "most aggressive Oscar campaign" it had ever undertaken.

Landreth dedicated the Academy Award to Larkin, stating in his acceptance speech that receiving the award was made possible because of "the grace and humility of one guy watching in Montreal". Larkin was watching the Academy Awards with friends at Copacabana, his favourite Montreal bar which he also referred to as his "office". He did not hear the speech because his friends and other bar patrons were cheering loudly and congratulating him after the film was announced as the winner.

Landreth hoped that winning the Academy Award would enable him to convince theatre operators to include Ryan preceding a full-length film in order to obtain greater mainstream exposure. In Canada, the Canadian Broadcasting Corporation (CBC) bought first window broadcast rights for Ryan and Alter Egos, and Alliance Atlantis bought second window rights. The CBC had already broadcast both films on The Passionate Eye and Rough Cuts. The NFB also signed agreements with specialty channels in Canada, the United States, and Europe to broadcast the film.

Ryan was in the 2004 collection of the Animation Show of Shows, and was included in the 11th volume and second box set it released.

== Legacy ==
Poster for the film Spare Change created by Ryan Larkin and Laurie Gordon, and completed by Gordon after Larkin's death.

Owing to the film's popularity, Larkin "found himself gaining unusual fame for someone who supposedly lived in obscurity". Larkin stated that because of the film, "there are millions of people out there wanting to see another Ryan Larkin film". Landreth established a fund at the Old Brewery Mission for Larkin who in 2005 began working on an animated film titled Spare Change about his panhandling on the streets of Montreal based on poems he had recently written. It was a collaboration with composer Laurie Gordon of the band Chiwawa, who would be responsible for the film's music and voices. When he began the project, he continued to panhandle on Saint-Laurent Boulevard, stating that "I can't disappoint my clientele". He was one of the panhandlers interviewed for the documentary film Chez Schwartz about the delicatessen.

In 2006, Larkin signed a contract with MTV Canada to create three five-second bumpers that aired on 25 and 26 December 2006. They were the only channel IDs to be broadcast by MTV Canada on those days. He died on Valentine's Day 2007 as a result of lung cancer that had metastasized to his brain. The ten-minute animation Spare Change was completed alone by Gordon, and premiered in a double bill with All Together Now at the Festival du nouveau cinéma in Montreal on 8 October 2008. The two films were shown together in theatres throughout Canada that month. Gordon and Nicola Zavaglia later released Ryan's Renaissance, a documentary film about Larkin and Spare Change.

Robinson stated in his book Ballad of a Thin Man: In Search of Ryan Larkin that although Larkin did not change because of the new-found attention, that "by knowing him, he seems to trigger change in others". In the book The Animation Pimp, Robinson states that he "quit drinking and started to make amends for the swamp of a life I created" after his few meetings with Larkin.

The eleven Seneca College students who were responsible for the animation of Ryan all found employment in the animation industry. Landreth received offers to produce feature films, but rejected them to create another animated short film, The Spine, which was released in 2009 and used the same production team and psychological realism technique that was used in Ryan. The software model created for the production of Ryan was the basis for a Master of Science thesis by Patrick Coleman.

Ryan is considered to be one of the high-profile examples of animated documentary. It was screened at the Ontario Science Centre in November 2005, during which the Body Worlds exhibit was on display. The film Alter Egos was commissioned by the NFB to document the making of Ryan, and includes interviews with Landreth, Larkin, and others.

== See also ==
- McLaren's Negatives
- Lipsett Diaries
- Arthur Lipsett

== Notes ==
- Armitage, John, ed. (2011). Virilio Now: Current Perspectives in Virilio Studies. Polity. ISBN 9780745648781.
- Baumgartner, Rick (19 August 2004). "SIGGRAPH 2004: Computer Animation Festival & Electronic Theater". Animation World Network.
- Besen, Ellen (16 December 2004). "Make It Real — Part 1: Off the Beaten Path". Animation World Network.
- Brown, Louise (1 March 2005). "A golden moment for college students who worked on award-winning film". Toronto Star. Torstar. ProQuest 438794301.
- Buchan, Suzanne, ed. (2013). Pervasive Animation. AFI Film Readers. Routledge. ISBN 9781136519543.
- Coleman, Patrick (2004). Interactive Control of Nonlinear Projection for Complex Animated Scenes (Master of Science). University of Toronto. CiteSeerX 10.1.1.94.799.
- Coleman, Patrick; Singh, Karan (11 August 2004), Cords: Keyframe Control of Curves with Physical Properties, Dynamic Graphics Project, University of Toronto
- Davis, Charles H.; Vladica, Florin (2010). "Valor del consumidor y modos de recepción de medios: respuestas de la audiencia Ryan, un pequeño documental psicorrealista animado por computador, y su propia documentación en Alter Egos" [Consumer Value and Modes of Media Reception: Audience Response to Ryan, a Computer-animated Psycho-realist Documentary and its Own Documentation in Alter Egos]. Palabra Clave (in Spanish). 13 (1): 13–29. doi:10.5294/pacla.2010.13.1.1. ISSN 0122-8285.
- DeMott, Rick (8 September 2005). "Submit Your Animation, Machinima and Game Trailers to the ION Fest". Animation World Network.
- DeMott, Rick (21 December 2006). "Ryan Larkin Resurfaces For MTV IDs". Animation World Network.
- DeMott, Rick (16 February 2007). "Ryan Larkin Dies at Age 63". Animation World Network.
- Desowitz, Bill (27 April 2004). "Ryan Short to Premiere at Cannes, Annecy and SIGGRAPH". Animation World Network.
- Dixon, Guy (26 February 2004). "The truth is in the lens of the beholder". The Globe and Mail.
- Dixon, Guy (25 February 2005). "NFB hopefuls clutch hot tickets". The Globe and Mail.
- Dixon, Guy (21 October 2006). "Poetry Chez Schwartz's". The Globe and Mail.
- Dixon, Guy (1 January 2007). "Larkin ascending". The Globe and Mail.
- Dixon, Guy (17 February 2007). "Ryan Larkin, 63". The Globe and Mail.
- Dixon, Guy (8 October 2008). "Larkin's animated legacy". The Globe and Mail.
- Doyle, John (4 November 2004). "A prime-time soap that's so, like, bad it's good". The Globe and Mail.
- Doyle, John (19 February 2011). "February's hard. And these shows don't make it better". The Globe and Mail.
- Ebert, Roger (2007). Roger Ebert's Movie Yearbook 2007. Andrews McMeel Publishing. ISBN 9780740792199.
- Ebert, Roger (24 February 2005). "Oscar Short Subject Nominees (2005)". Ebert Digital LLC.
- Heatherington, Janet (28 November 2007). "The National Film Board of Canada: 'Auteur' Animation". Animation World Magazine. Animation World Network.
- Honess Roe, Annabelle (2013). Animated Documentary. Palgrave Macmillan. ISBN 9781137017468.
- Hutsul, Christopher (23 February 2005). "Drawing a downfall". Toronto Star. Torstar. ProQuest 438777091.
- Jaakkola, Maarit (13 March 2005). "Tampere Film Festival Grand Prix to Pjotr Sapegin" (Press release). Tampere Film Festival. Archived from the original on 23 December 2005.
- Kehr, David (25 March 2005). "Oscar-Nominated Shorts Few See but Many Should". The New York Times.
- Kriger, Judith (2011). Animated Realism: A Behind the Scenes Look at the Animated Documentary Genre. Focal Press. ISBN 9780240814407.
- Kundert-Gibbs, John; Kunzendorf, Eric; Derakhshani, Dariush; Larkins, Mick; Keller, Eric; Livny, Boaz; de Souza, MArk (2006). Mastering Maya 7. John Wiley & Sons. ISBN 9780782144420.
- Lacey, Liam (16 December 2004). "Film critics hail Sideways as best 2004 movie". The Globe and Mail.
- Landreth, Chris (1 April 2005). "Q&A: Animator/director Chris Landreth". Studio Daily (Interview). Interviewed by Michelle Paster. Access Intelligence.
- Louguet, Patrick; Maheu, Fabien, eds. (2011). "Cinéma(s) et nouvelles technologies: continuités et ruptures créatives". Cahiers du CIRCAV (22). Editions L'Harmattan. ISBN 9782296555693.
- Luz, Filipe Costa (2010). "Digital Animation: Repercussions of new media on traditional animation concepts". In Zhang, Xiaopeng; Zhong, Shaochun; Pan, Zhigeng; Wong, Kevin; Yun, Ruwei (eds.). Entertainment for Education. Digital Techniques and Systems. 5th International Conference on E-learning and Games (August 2010). Lecture Notes in Computer Science. Vol. 6249. Changchun: Springer Berlin Heidelberg. pp. 562–569. doi:10.1007/978-3-642-14533-9_57. ISBN 9783642145322.
- MacDonald, Gayle (1 March 2005). "Lauded film fights obscurity". The Globe and Mail.
- Maguire, Ellen (3 April 2005). "True Montreal Story". The New York Times.
- Mandell, Laura (Spring 2005). "Ryan wins Oscar" (PDF). Seneca Alumni. 1. Seneca College Alumni Association.
- Martinelli, Lawrence Thomas (July 2012). Il documentario animato. Un nuovo genere di racconto del reale e i suoi protagonisti internazionali [The animated documentary. A new kind of account of the real and its international protagonists] (in Italian). Latina: Tunué. ISBN 9788897165446.
- Martins, Índia Mara (May 2008). "O documentário animado de Chris Landreth: experimentação e tecnologia" [The animated documentary of Chris Landreth: experimentation and technology]. Actas do 5º Congresso da Associação Portuguesa de Ciências da Comunicação. 5º Congresso da Associação Portuguesa de Ciências da Comunicação (in Portuguese). University of Minho (Braga): Associação Portuguesa de Ciências da Comunicação (SOPCOM). pp. 84–95. ISBN 9789899550018.
- Mills, Robert (15 February 2010). A comparative analysis of the contemporary documentary films Ryan and Waltz with Bashir as animated representations of autobiographical reality (Master of Arts). University of the Witwatersrand.
- O'Hailey, Tina (2013). Rig it Right! Maya Animation Rigging Concepts. Taylor & Francis. ISBN 9780240820798.
- O'Hara, Kathleen (21 May 2004). "Canadian films earn quiet raves in Cannes". Toronto Star. Torstar. ProQuest 438701120.
- Pilling, Jayne, ed. (2013). Animating the Unconscious: Desire, Sexuality, and Animation. Columbia University Press. ISBN 9780231850148.
- Power, Pat (July 2009). "Animated Expressions: Expressive Style in 3D Computer Graphic Narrative AnimationAnimated Expressions: Expressive Style in 3D Computer Graphic Narrative Animation". Animation. 4 (2). SAGE Publications: 107–129. CiteSeerX 10.1.1.458.8449. doi:10.1177/1746847709104643. S2CID 54056847.
- Quinn, Ellis (28 February 2005). "Ryan the toast of St-Laurent". Toronto Star. Torstar. ProQuest 438771517.
- Robertson, Barbara (July 2004). "Psychorealism". Computer Graphics World. 27 (7).
- Robinson, Chris (2007). The Animation Pimp. Cengage Learning. ISBN 9781435457935.
- Robinson, Chris (2009). Ballad of a Thin Man: In Search of Ryan Larkin. Cengage Learning. ISBN 9781598639087.
- Robinson, Chris (2010). Animators Unearthed: A Guide to the Best of Contemporary Animation. Continuum International Publishing Group. ISBN 9780826429568.
- Sawhney, Anubha (20 March 2005). "NRI prof makes an Oscar splash". The Times of India. New Delhi.
- Siddiqui, Tabassum (30 November 2005). "Rabbi, imam, Mohawk talk about Body Worlds". Toronto Star. Torstar. ProQuest 438895373.
- Singer, Gregory (4 June 2004). "Landreth on 'Ryan'". Animation World Network.
- Slade, Mark (13 September 1969). "Ryan Larkin: Painting on film to stir the minds of old and young". The Gazette.
- Stone, M.J. (12 March 2007). "Ryan Larkin, filmmaker and derelict, 1943-2007". The Globe and Mail.
- Taylor, Kate (2 March 2005). "Ryan gives a leg-up to reanimated NFB". The Globe and Mail.
- Teninge, Annick (18 July 2000). "Canadian Animators Lead The Pack At Ottawa 00". Animation World Network.
- Waugh, Thomas (2006). Romance of Transgression in Canada: Queering Sexualities, Nations, Cinemas. McGill-Queen's University Press. ISBN 9780773576803.
- Wells, Paul (2006). The Fundamentals of Animation. Fundamentals Series. AVA Publishing. ISBN 9782940373024.
- Whyte, Murray (21 December 2006). "Filmmaker's reanimation". Toronto Star. Torstar. ProQuest 439113503.
- "Landreth's Ryan wins". The Globe and Mail. The Canadian Press. 27 February 2005.
- "Mathematicians celebrate Oscar win". The Globe and Mail. 4 March 2005.
- "The 77th Academy Awards (2005) Nominees and Winners". Oscar Legacy. Academy of Motion Picture Arts and Sciences. Archived from the original on 2013-12-24.
- "Ryan, by Chris Landreth". Acme Filmworks. Archived from the original on 4 March 2016.
- "2004 - Special Jury Award: Ryan". Annecy International Animated Film Festival.
- "SIGGRAPH 2004 Announces Best Animated Short & Jury Award for the Computer Animation Festival" (Press release). Chicago: Association for Computing Machinery. 3 May 2004.
- "Genies, Best Animated Short, 2004". Canada's Awards Database. Academy of Canadian Cinema & Television. Archived from the original on 8 January 2014.
- "Maya Software at the Core of Oscar Winning Spider-Man 2 and Ryan" (Press release). Toronto: Alias Systems. 1 March 2005. Archived from the original on 2014-02-21.
- "52nd Annual Chris Awards" (PDF). Columbus International Film & Video Festival. 13 November 2004. Archived from the original (PDF) on 9 May 2015.
- "Discreet Congratulates Visual Effects and Animated Short Film Academy Award Winners: Spider-Man 2 and Ryan" (Press release). Hollywood: Discreet Logic. 28 February 2005. Archived from the original on 2014-02-21.
- "The Heart of documentary". Leipziger Dok-Filmwochen. Archived from the original on 22 February 2014.
- "2005 Cork Film Festival Winners Announced". Irish Film Research. 18 October 2005. Archived from the original on 4 March 2016.
- "Alter Egos". National Film Board of Canada.
- "2004 OIAF official competition award winners". Ottawa International Animation Festival. 26 September 2004.
- "9th Puchon Choice Awards". Puchon International Fantastic Film Festival. 2005. Archived from the original on 29 October 2014.
- "Ryan". San Francisco Film Society.
- "23rd edition, 2004 18–24 October". Short Film Central.
- "Ryan". Sundance Institute.
- "Canada's Top Ten Film Festival". Toronto International Film Festival. Archived from the original on 21 February 2014.
- "49th Edition". Valladolid International Film Festival. Archived from the original on 12 March 2016.
- "2005 VIFVF Awards". Victoria Film Festival. 13 February 2005.
