= 2007 in film =

The following is an overview of events in 2007 in film, including the highest-grossing films, award ceremonies and festivals, a list of films released and notable deaths. The highest-grossing film of the year was Pirates of the Caribbean: At World's End, which was just marginally ahead of Harry Potter and the Order of the Phoenix. 2007 is often considered one of the greatest years for film in the 21st century. It was also the last year to never have a film gross $1 billion until 2020.

== Evaluation of the year ==
In his article from April 18, 2017, which highlighted the best movies of 2007, critic Mark Allison of Den of Geek said, "2007 must surely be remembered as one of the finest years in English-language film-making, quite possibly the best of this century so far. Like 1939, 1976, or 1994, it was one of those years in which a succession of veritable classics came into being. So many, in fact, that some of the best examples were cruelly overlooked by the hype machine of the day." He also emphasized, "If 2007 proves anything, it's that classic films aren't just a relic of ages past; they're being made all around us. I can't wait to see what we're watching in another ten years' time."

Critic Craig Johnson from the film review and movie list website Taste of Cinema said in an article from December 16, 2014, "For one glorious year, it (2007) was like the 1970s all over again. Smart characters were using their brains as weapons. Movie stars were challenging themselves with tough roles. Punches were not pulled. Happy endings were not guaranteed. There was a parade of intelligent movies, seemingly made for adults to watch while the kids were watching Transformers".

== Highest-grossing films ==
The top 10 films released in 2007 by worldwide gross are as follows:

Highest-grossing films of 2007
Rank	Title	Distributor	Worldwide gross
1	Pirates of the Caribbean: At World's End	Disney	$960,996,492
2	Harry Potter and the Order of the Phoenix	Warner Bros.	$941,676,843
3	Spider-Man 3	Sony	$895,871,626
4	Shrek the Third	Paramount	$813,367,380
5	Transformers	Paramount	$709,709,780
6	Ratatouille	Disney	$623,726,085
7	I Am Legend	Warner Bros.	$585,410,052
8	The Simpsons Movie	20th Century Fox	$536,414,270
9	National Treasure: Book of Secrets	Disney	$459,242,249
10	300	Warner Bros.	$456,068,181

== Events ==
Month
Day
Event
January
9
33rd People's Choice Awards: Pirates of the Caribbean: Dead Man's Chest wins Favorite Movie, Favorite Movie Drama, and Favorite On Screen Matchup for Johnny Depp and Keira Knightley. Depp also wins Favorite Male Action Star and Favorite Male Movie Star.
13
64th Golden Globe Awards: Major winners include Dreamgirls and Babel.
17
Illumination is founded by Chris Meledandri.
20
Little Miss Sunshine is chosen as best picture by the Producers Guild of America.
22
The Golden Raspberry Awards announces picks for worst film achievement in 2007, with both Little Man and Basic Instinct 2 leading with seven nominations. Other nominees included Lady in the Water, RV, The Shaggy Dog, and Date Movie.
23
79th Academy Awards nominations announced, leading films are:
- 8: Dreamgirls
- 7: Babel
- 6: Pan's Labyrinth
- 6: The Queen
- 5: The Departed
28
Screen Actors Guild Awards: Helen Mirren, for Best Female Actor, Forest Whitaker, for Best Male Actor, Eddie Murphy, for Best Male Supporting Actor, Jennifer Hudson, for Best Female Supporting Actor.
February
15
BAFTA Awards: Major winners include Helen Mirren, Best Actress and Forest Whitaker, Best Actor
24
Basic Instinct 2 dominates the Golden Raspberry Awards, walking away with 4 awards, including Worst Picture and Worst Actress (Sharon Stone). M. Night Shyamalan wins Worst Director and Worst Supporting Actor for Lady in the Water. Other awards include Shawn and Marlon Wayans for Little Man and Carmen Electra for Scary Movie 4 and Date Movie.
25
79th Academy Awards: The Departed wins picture and director (Martin Scorsese) and two other awards. Helen Mirren (The Queen) and Forest Whitaker (The Last King of Scotland) win top acting awards for leading roles, while Jennifer Hudson (Dreamgirls) and Alan Arkin (Little Miss Sunshine) win top acting awards for supporting roles.
March
27
12th Empire Awards: Casino Royale wins the most awards with three including Best Film and Best Actor for Daniel Craig.
April
25
The 2007 Tribeca Film Festival opens with notable films such as Spider-Man 3 and Surf's Up.
May
6
Spider-Man 3 finishes weekend with a total weekend gross of $151,116,516, breaking the previous record set by Pirates of the Caribbean: Dead Man's Chest.
27
4 Months, 3 Weeks and 2 Days, a Romanian film by Cristian Mungiu wins the top prize, the Palme d'Or, at the Cannes Film Festival. Paranoid Park, a film by Gus Van Sant wins the 60th Anniversary Prize.
June
20
The American Film Institute holds a revised edition of 100 Years...100 Movies. Citizen Kane retains its place as the greatest movie of the past century.
September
12
Producer Gil Cates elects Jon Stewart as MC for the 80th Academy Awards.
November
5
12,000 writers of the Writers Guild of America go on strike affecting both motion picture and television production, including the Golden Globes and the Academy Awards in 2008.
December
13
Nomination for the 65th Golden Globe Awards are announced. Atonement earns the most entries with seven. Charlie Wilson's War follows with five.

== Awards ==
Category/Organization	13th Critics' Choice Awards January 7, 2008	65th Golden Globe Awards January 14, 2008		Producers, Directors, Screen Actors, and Writers Guild Awards	61st BAFTA Awards February 10, 2008	80th Academy Awards February 24, 2008
Category/Organization	13th Critics' Choice Awards January 7, 2008	Drama	Musical or Comedy	Producers, Directors, Screen Actors, and Writers Guild Awards	61st BAFTA Awards February 10, 2008	80th Academy Awards February 24, 2008
Best Film	No Country for Old Men	Atonement	Sweeney Todd: The Demon Barber of Fleet Street	No Country for Old Men	Atonement	No Country for Old Men
Best Director	Joel Coen and Ethan Coen; No Country for Old Men	Julian Schnabel; The Diving Bell and the Butterfly		Joel Coen and Ethan Coen; No Country for Old Men		
Best Actor	Daniel Day-Lewis; There Will Be Blood		Johnny Depp; Sweeney Todd: The Demon Barber of Fleet Street	Daniel Day-Lewis; There Will Be Blood		
Best Actress	Julie Christie; Away From Her		Marion Cotillard; La Vie en Rose	Julie Christie; Away From Her	Marion Cotillard; La Vie en Rose	
Best Supporting Actor	Javier Bardem; No Country for Old Men					
Best Supporting Actress	Amy Ryan; Gone Baby Gone	Cate Blanchett; I'm Not There		Ruby Dee; American Gangster	Tilda Swinton; Michael Clayton	
Best Screenplay, Adapted	Diablo Cody; Juno	Joel Coen and Ethan Coen; No Country for Old Men		Joel Coen and Ethan Coen; No Country for Old Men	Ronald Harwood; The Diving Bell and the Butterfly	Joel Coen and Ethan Coen; No Country for Old Men
Best Screenplay, Original	Diablo Cody; Juno	Joel Coen and Ethan Coen; No Country for Old Men		Diablo Cody; Juno		
Best Animated Film	Ratatouille					
Best Original Score	There Will Be Blood; Jonny Greenwood	Atonement; Dario Marianelli		—N/a	La Vie en Rose; Christopher Gunning	Atonement; Dario Marianelli
Best Original Song	"Falling Slowly"; Once	"Guaranteed"; Into the Wild		—N/a	—N/a	"Falling Slowly"; Once
Best Foreign Language Film	The Diving Bell and the Butterfly			—N/a	The Lives of Others	The Counterfeiters
Best Documentary	Sicko	—N/a	—N/a	Sicko	—N/a	Taxi to the Dark Side

Palme d'Or (60th Cannes Film Festival):

4 Months, 3 Weeks and 2 Days (4 luni, 3 săptămâni şi 2 zile), directed by Cristian Mungiu, Romania

Golden Lion (64th Venice International Film Festival):

Lust, Caution (色，戒), directed by Ang Lee, Taiwan

Golden Bear (57th Berlin International Film Festival):

Tuya's Marriage (圖雅的婚事), directed by Wang Quan'an, China

== 2007 films ==
=== By country/region ===
- List of American films of 2007
- List of Argentine films of 2007
- List of Australian films of 2007
- List of Bangladeshi films of 2007
- List of Bengali films of 2007
- List of Bollywood films of 2007
- List of Brazilian films of 2007
- List of British films of 2007
- List of Canadian films of 2007
- List of Chinese films of 2007
- List of French films of 2007
- List of Hong Kong films of 2007
- List of Italian films of 2007
- List of Japanese films of 2007
- List of Marathi films of 2007
- List of Mexican films of the 2000s
- List of Pakistani films of 2007
- List of Russian films of 2007
- List of South Korean films of 2007
- List of Spanish films of 2007
- List of Kannada films of 2007
- List of Malayalam films of 2007
- List of Tamil films of 2007
- List of Telugu films of 2007

=== By genre/medium ===
- List of action films of 2007
- List of animated feature films of 2007
- List of avant-garde films of 2007
- List of crime films of 2007
- List of comedy films of 2007
- List of drama films of 2007
- List of horror films of 2007
- List of science fiction films of 2007
- List of thriller films of 2007
- List of western films of 2007

== Births ==
- January 18 – Tyler Crumley, American actor
- January 28 – Alaya High, American actress and singer
- January 30 – Braxton Alexander, American actor
- February 2 – Florence Hunt, English actress
- February 16 – Choi Ro-woon, South Korean actor
- February 27 – Demi Singleton, American actress, singer, and dancer
- March 1 – Miguel Cazarez Mora, American actor
- March 4 – Miya Cech, American actress
- March 5 – Roman Griffin Davis, British actor
- March 10 – Malachi Barton, American actor
- March 25 – Cailey Fleming, American actress
- May 11 – Samantha Lorraine, American actress
- June 2 – Jacob Moran, American actor
- June 6 – Aubrey Anderson-Emmons, American actress
- June 12 – Jack Veal, English actor
- June 14 – Lyon Daniels, American actor
- June 16 - Billy Barratt, English actor
- July 10 – Mason Thames, American actor
- July 14 – Darby Camp, American actress
- July 17 – Charlie Shotwell, American actor
- July 18 – JD McCrary, American singer, dancer and actor
- July 27 - Alyvia Alyn Lind, American actress
- August 24 – Noah Cottrell, American actor
- August 27 – Ariana Greenblatt, American actress
- August 28 – August Maturo, American actor
- September 14 – Heo Jung-eun, South Korean actress
- October 11 – Raffiella Chapman, British actress
- October 22 – Izaac Wang, American actor
- November 3 – Ever Anderson, American actress and model
- November 23 – Lonnie Chavis, American actor and activist
- December 4 – Scarlett Estevez, American actress
- December 27 – Faithe Herman, American actress

== Deaths ==
Month	Date	Name	Age	Country	Profession	Notable films
January	1	A. I. Bezzerides	98	US	Screenwriter	They Drive by Night; Kiss Me Deadly
January	4	Ben Gannon	54	Australia	Producer	Gallipoli; The Man Who Sued God
January	4	Christopher Greenbury	55	UK	Film Editor	American Beauty; Dumb and Dumber
January	8	Yvonne De Carlo	84	Canada	Actress	The Ten Commandments; McLintock!
January	8	Iwao Takamoto	81	US	Animator, Director	Charlotte's Web; Jetsons: The Movie
January	10	Carlo Ponti	94	Italy	Producer	Doctor Zhivago; Blowup
January	11	Solveig Dommartin	45	Algeria	Actress	Wings of Desire; Until the End of the World
January	11	Tudor Gates	77	UK	Screenwriter	Barbarella; Danger: Diabolik
January	14	Harvey Cohen	55	US	Orchestrator	King Kong; Mission: Impossible III
January	16	Ron Carey	71	US	Actor	High Anxiety; History of the World, Part I
January	20	Brian Eatwell	67	UK	Production Designer	The Three Musketeers; The Man Who Fell to Earth
January	21	Myrtle Devenish	94	UK	Actress	Brazil; Monty Python's The Meaning of Life
January	22	Anna Cropper	68	UK	Actress	Cromwell; All Neat in Black Stockings
January	23	David M. Ronne	63	US	Sound Engineer	Mr. & Mrs. Smith; Face/Off
January	27	Tige Andrews	86	US	Actor	Mister Roberts; The Last Tycoon
January	28	Teala Loring	84	US	Actress	Gas House Kids; Fall Guy
January	30	Sidney Sheldon	89	US	Screenwriter	Easter Parade; The Other Side of Midnight
February	1	George Robotham	86	US	Stuntman, Actor	The Goonies; Mississippi Burning
February	3	Donfeld	72	US	Costume Designer	The Great Race; Prizzi's Honor
February	4	Barbara McNair	72	US	Actress, Singer	They Call Me Mister Tibbs!; Stiletto
February	6	Frankie Laine	93	US	Actor, Singer	Meet Me in Las Vegas; Bring Your Smile Along
February	8	Anna Nicole Smith	39	US	Actress	Naked Gun 33 1/3: The Final Insult; Skyscraper
February	9	Ian Richardson	72	UK	Actor	Brazil; Dark City
February	9	Erik Schumann	82	Germany	Actor	Veronika Voss; Lili Marleen
February	12	Peter Ellenshaw	93	UK	Visual Effects Artist	Mary Poppins; Spartacus
February	12	Randy Stone	48	US	Casting Director, Actor	Jaws 3-D; Say Anything...
February	14	Ryan Larkin	63	Canada	Animator, Director	Walking; Street Musique
February	14	Lee Patterson	77	Canada	Actor	Jack the Ripper; Time Lock
February	15	Ray Evans	92	US	Lyricist	The Man Who Knew Too Much; The Paleface
February	19	Janet Blair	85	US	Actress	Tonight and Every Night; My Sister Eileen
February	22	Fons Rademakers	86	Netherlands	Director, Actor	The Assault; The Village on the River
February	24	Bruce Bennett	100	US	Actor	Mildred Pierce; The Treasure of the Sierra Madre
March	1	Harold Michelson	87	US	Art Director, Production Designer	Star Trek: The Motion Picture; Dick Tracy
March	7	Andy Sidaris	76	US	Director, Screenwriter	Guns; Hard Ticket to Hawaii
March	8	John Inman	71	UK	Actor	Are You Being Served?; The Tall Guy
March	10	Richard Jeni	49	US	Comedian, Actor	The Mask; An Alan Smithee Film: Burn Hollywood Burn
March	12	Betty Hutton	86	US	Actress, Singer	Annie Get Your Gun; The Miracle of Morgan's Creek
March	13	Herbert Fux	79	Austria	Actor	The Three Musketeers; Asterix & Obelix Take On Caesar
March	15	Alice Backes	83	US	Actress	I Want to Live!; Gable and Lombard
March	15	Stuart Rosenberg	79	US	Director	Cool Hand Luke; The Amityville Horror
March	17	Freddie Francis	89	UK	Cinematographer, Director	Glory; The Elephant Man
March	18	William N. Panzer	64	US	Producer	Highlander; The Osterman Weekend
March	19	Calvert DeForest	85	US	Actor	Waitress!; Freaked
March	20	John P. Ryan	70	US	Actor	The Right Stuff; Runaway Train
March	22	Bradley Lavelle	48	Canada	Actor	Judge Dredd; Superman IV: The Quest for Peace
March	25	Lynn Merrick	87	US	Actress	Voice of the Whistler; A Close Call for Boston Blackie
March	26	Bill Capizzi	70	US	Actor	Don Juan DeMarco; Bulletproof
March	29	John Gill	94	UK	Actor	This Sporting Life; Tess
March	29	Howard Goorney	85	UK	Actor	Fiddler on the Roof; The Hill
March	29	Calvin Lockhart	72	Bahamas	Actor	Cotton Comes to Harlem; Let's Do It Again
April	1	George Sewell	82	UK	Actor	Barry Lyndon; Get Carter
April	4	Bob Clark	67	US	Director, Screenwriter	A Christmas Story; Porky's
April	4	John Flynn	75	US	Director	Rolling Thunder; Lock Up
April	6	Luigi Comencini	90	Italy	Director	Bread, Love and Dreams; Everybody Go Home
April	6	George Jenkins	98	US	Production Designer	All the President's Men; Klute
April	7	Barry Nelson	89	US	Actor	The Shining; Shadow of the Thin Man
April	8	Roscoe Lee Browne	79	US	Actor	The Cowboys; Logan's Run
April	9	A. J. Carothers	75	US	Screenwriter	The Happiest Millionaire; The Secret of My Success
April	10	Jack Williams	85	US	Stuntman	Gone with the Wind; Wild Wild West
April	12	James Lyons	46	US	Film Editor	Far from Heaven; The Virgin Suicides
April	16	Giuseppe Ruzzolini	76	Italy	Cinematographer	Firestarter; Duck, You Sucker!
April	17	Kitty Carlisle	96	US	Actress, Singer	A Night at the Opera; Murder at the Vanities
April	19	Jean-Pierre Cassel	74	France	Actor	Murder on the Orient Express; Is Paris Burning?
April	24	Roy Jenson	80	Canada	Actor, Stuntman	Chinatown; Red Dawn
April	27	Al Hunter Ashton	49	UK	Actor	Gladiator; From Hell
April	28	Dabbs Greer	90	US	Actor	The Green Mile; Invasion of the Body Snatchers
April	30	Tom Poston	85	US	Actor	Christmas with the Kranks; Zotz!
April	30	Gordon Scott	80	US	Actor	Tarzan's Hidden Jungle; Zorro and the Three Musketeers
May	5	Gusti Wolf	95	Austria	Actress	Orient Express; When a Woman Loves
May	7	Curtis Harrington	80	US	Director	Queen of Blood; Games
May	7	Nicholas Worth	69	US	Actor	Swamp Thing; Darkman
May	8	Mark Burns	71	UK	Actor	Stardust; Death in Venice
May	11	Bernard Gordon	88	US	Screenwriter	55 Days at Peking; Earth vs. the Flying Saucers
May	15	Yolanda King	51	US	Actress	Ghosts of Mississippi; Hopscotch
May	16	C. Timothy O'Meara	64	US	Film Editor	Conan the Barbarian; The Last Starfighter
May	21	Bruno Mattei	75	Italy	Director	SS Girls; Strike Commando
May	21	Bud Molin	81	US	Film Editor	The Jerk; Dead Men Don't Wear Plaid
May	22	Art Stevens	92	US	Animator, Director	The Fox and the Hound; The Rescuers
May	25	Lee Frost	71	US	Director, Screenwriter	Chrome and Hot Leather; The Black Gestapo
May	25	Charles Nelson Reilly	76	US	Actor	All Dogs Go to Heaven; Cannonball Run II
May	29	Norman Kaye	80	Australia	Actor	Moulin Rouge!; Oscar and Lucinda
May	30	Jean-Claude Brialy	74	France	Actor	Le Beau Serge; The Monster
May	30	Nick Ramus	77	US	Actor	Star Trek IV: The Voyage Home; Invasion USA
June	2	Charles Evans	81	US	Producer	Tootsie; Showgirls
June	9	Alma Beltran	87	Mexico	Actress	Ghost; Marathon Man
June	9	Christina Kokubo	56	US	Actress	Midway; The Yakuza
June	9	Beverly Michaels	79	US	Actress	Wicked Woman; East Side, West Side
June	9	Ousmane Sembène	84	Senegal	Director, Screenwriter	Black Girl; Moolaadé
June	11	Mala Powers	75	US	Actress	Cyrano de Bergerac; City Beneath the Sea
June	14	Alex Thomson	78	UK	Cinematographer	Excalibur; Demolition Man
June	22	Willy Holt	85	US	Production Designer	Is Paris Burning?; Au revoir les enfants
June	28	Leo Burmester	63	US	Actor	The Abyss; A Perfect World
June	29	Edward Yang	59	Taiwan	Director	Yi Yi; Taipei Story
July	5	Kerwin Mathews	81	UK	Actor	The 7th Voyage of Sinbad; The Three Worlds of Gulliver
July	9	Charles Lane	102	US	Actor	Mr. Smith Goes to Washington; Murphy's Romance
July	11	Richard Franklin	58	Australia	Director	Psycho II; Cloak & Dagger
July	12	Marc Behm	82	US	Screenwriter	Help!; The Thirteen Chairs
July	13	Michael Reardon	42	US	Actor	The Punisher; Cabin Fever
July	15	Kieron Moore	82	Ireland	Actor	Anna Karenina; The Day of the Triffids
July	19	Laura Devon	76	US	Actress	Red Line 7000; Goodbye Charlie
July	22	Laszlo Kovacs	74	Hungary	Cinematographer	Easy Rider; Ghostbusters
July	23	Joan O'Hara	76	Ireland	Actress	The Dawning; Far and Away
July	24	Chaney Kley	34	US	Actor	Darkness Falls; Legally Blonde
July	26	John Normington	70	UK	Actor	Atonement; Rollerball
July	27	William J. Tuttle	95	US	Makeup Artist	North by Northwest; 7 Faces of Dr. Lao
July	29	Michel Serrault	79	France	Actor	La Cage aux Folles; Nelly and Mr. Arnaud
July	30	Michelangelo Antonioni	94	Italy	Director, Screenwriter	Blowup; L'Avventura
July	30	Ingmar Bergman	89	Sweden	Director, Screenwriter	Persona; The Seventh Seal
August	2	Frank Rosenfelt	85	US	Studio Executive	
August	3	James T. Callahan	76	US	Actor	The Burning Bed; Lady Sings the Blues
August	5	Peter Graham Scott	82	UK	Director	Captain Clegg; Bitter Harvest
August	8	Melville Shavelson	90	US	Screenwriter, Director	Yours, Mine and Ours; Houseboat
August	12	Merv Griffin	82	US	Producer, Actor	So This Is Love; The Boy from Oklahoma
August	22	Keith Knight	51	Canada	Actor	Meatballs; My Bloody Valentine
August	23	Robert Symonds	80	US	Actor	The Exorcist; Catch Me if You Can
August	24	Aaron Russo	80	US	Producer	Trading Places; The Rose
August	25	Elizabeth Inglis	94	UK	Actress	The 39 Steps; The Letter
August	27	Richard T. Heffron	76	US	Director	Futureworld; I, the Jury
August	28	Miyoshi Umeki	78	Japan	Actress	Sayonara; The Horizontal Lieutenant
August	30	José Luis de Vilallonga	87	Spain	Actor	Breakfast at Tiffany's; Blood and Sand
September	2	Marcia Mae Jones	83	US	Actress	Heidi; The Way We Were
September	3	Steve Ryan	60	US	Actor	D.A.R.Y.L.; I'm Not Rappaport
September	4	Michael Evans	87	UK	Actor	Time After Time; Bye Bye Birdie
September	5	Nikos Nikolaidis	67	Greece	Director	Evrydiki BA 2O37; The Wretches Are Still Singing
September	5	Charlotte Zucker	86	US	Actress	Airplane!; Ghost
September	6	Percy Rodriguez	89	Canada	Actor	The Heart Is a Lonely Hunter; The Plainsman
September	10	Jane Wyman	90	US	Actress	Johnny Belinda; Magnificent Obsession
September	14	Emilio Ruiz del Río	84	Spain	Special Effects Artist	Pan's Labyrinth; Spartacus
September	21	Alice Ghostley	81	US	Actress	To Kill a Mockingbird; Grease
September	22	Karl Hardman	80	US	Actor, Producer	Night of the Living Dead; Santa Claws
September	22	Marcel Marceau	84	France	Actor	Barbarella; Silent Movie
September	28	Charles B. Griffith	77	US	Screenwriter, Director	Death Race 2000; The Little Shop of Horrors
September	28	Martin Manulis	92	US	Producer	Days of Wine and Roses; Luv
September	29	Lois Maxwell	80	Canada	Actress	James Bond; That Hagen Girl
October	1	Peggy Maley	84	US	Actress	The Wild One; Human Desire
October	2	George Grizzard	79	US	Actor	Advise & Consent; From the Terrace
October	6	Bud Ekins	77	US	Stuntman	The Great Escape; The Blues Brothers
October	9	Carol Bruce	87	US	Actor	Keep 'Em Flying; This Woman is Mine
October	12	Lonny Chapman	87	US	Actor	The Birds; The Hunted
October	14	Sigrid Valdis	79	US	Actress	Our Man Flint; Marriage on the Rocks
October	16	Deborah Kerr	86	UK	Actress	From Here to Eternity; An Affair to Remember
October	17	Joey Bishop	89	US	Actor	Ocean's 11; Betsy's Wedding
October	17	Harry Kleiner	91	Russia	Screenwriter	Fantastic Voyage; Bullitt
October	20	Arlene Francis	93	US	Actress	One, Two, Three; The Thrill of It All
October	21	Don Fellows	84	US	Actor	Raiders of the Lost Ark; The Omen
October	21	Vic Ramos	77	US	Casting Director	Star Wars; The Godfather Part II
October	24	Masakazu Yoshizawa	57	Japan	Musician	Memoirs of a Geisha; Dragon: The Bruce Lee Story
October	26	Bernard L. Kowalski	78	US	Director	Krakatoa, East of Java; Sssssss
October	27	Moira Lister	84	South Africa	Actress	The Yellow Rolls-Royce; The Cruel Sea
October	29	David Morris	83	UK	Actor	Charlie and the Chocolate Factory; Flick
October	30	Robert Goulet	73	US	Singer, Actor	Honeymoon Hotel; Beetlejuice
October	30	Yisrael Poliakov	66	Israel	Comedian, Actor	Giv'at Halfon Eina Ona; Schlager
November	1	Sonny Bupp	79	US	Actor	Citizen Kane; Angels with Dirty Faces
November	2	Henry Cele	58	South Africa	Actor	The Last Samurai; The Ghost and the Darkness
November	4	Peter Viertel	86	Germany	Screenwriter	White Hunter Black Heart; Five Miles to Midnight
November	6	Peter Handford	88	UK	Sound Engineer	Dangerous Liaisons; Out of Africa
November	10	Jack Bear	87	US	Costume Designer	The Party; The Odd Couple
November	10	Laraine Day	87	US	Actress	The High and the Mighty; Foreign Correspondent
November	10	Norman Mailer	84	US	Screenwriter, Director, Actor	Ragtime; Tough Guys Don't Dance
November	11	Delbert Mann	89	US	Director	Marty; That Touch of Mink
November	12	Al Mancini	74	US	Actor	Falling Down; Miller's Crossing
November	13	Monty Westmore	84	US	Makeup Artist	Hook; The Shawshank Redemption
November	13	Peter Zinner	88	Austria	Film Editor, Director	The Godfather; The Deer Hunter
November	14	Michael Blodgett	87	US	Actor, Screenwriter	Turner & Hooch; 40 Guns to Apache Pass
November	14	Ronnie Burns	72	US	Actor	Anatomy of a Psycho; Bernardine
November	22	Verity Lambert	71	UK	Producer	Clockwise; Evil Angels
November	22	Reg Park	79	UK	Actor	Hercules and the Conquest of Atlantis; Maciste in King Solomon's Mines
November	26	Marit Allen	66	UK	Costume Designer	Mrs. Doubtfire; Brokeback Mountain
November	28	Jeanne Bates	89	US	Actress	Eraserhead; Die Hard 2
November	28	Mali Finn	69	US	Casting Director	The Matrix; Titanic
November	30	Evel Knievel	69	US	Daredevil, Actor	Viva Knievel!; Freebie and the Bean
December	1	Gary Epper	62	US	Stuntman, Actor	Scarface; Jurassic Park
December	1	Anton Rodgers	74	UK	Actor	Scrooge; Dirty Rotten Scoundrels
December	2	Eleonora Rossi Drago	82	Italy	Actress	Le amiche; The Bible: In the Beginning...
December	4	Melvin Shapiro	82	US	Film Editor	Taxi Driver; American Hot Wax
December	5	Joe Brooks	83	US	Actor	Gremlins; The Bad News Bears
December	5	Tony Tenser	87	UK	Producer	Repulsion; Cul-de-sac
December	8	Donald Burton	73	UK	Actor	Hudson Hawk; The Message
December	10	Ashleigh Aston Moore	26	US	Actress	Now and Then; Gold Diggers: The Secret of Bear Mountain
December	11	Freddie Fields	84	US	Producer	Glory; Escape to Victory
December	13	Floyd Red Crow Westerman	71	US	Actor, Singer	Dances with Wolves; Hidalgo
December	19	Frank Capra, Jr.	73	US	Producer	Escape from the Planet of the Apes; Firestarter
December	19	James Costigan	81	US	Screenwriter	The Hunger; King David
December	20	Jeanne Carmen	77	US	Actress	Portland Exposé; Untamed Youth
December	21	John McPherson	65	US	Cinematographer	Batteries Not Included; Just One of the Guys
December	23	Michael Kidd	92	US	Actor, Choreographer	It's Always Fair Weather; Seven Brides for Seven Brothers
December	28	Tab Thacker	45	US	Actor	City Heat; Wildcats

== Film debuts ==
- Gbenga Akinnagbe – The Savages
- Gemma Arterton – St. Trinian's
- Hayley Atwell – Cassandra's Dream
- Haley Bennett – Music and Lyrics
- Alison Brie – Born
- Jamie Chung – I Now Pronounce You Chuck and Larry
- Adèle Exarchopoulos – Boxes
- Michael Fassbender – 300
- Dave Franco – Superbad
- Zachary Gordon – Because I Said So
- Hafsia Herzi – The Secret of the Grain
- Ken Jeong – Knocked Up
- Christopher Mintz-Plasse – Superbad
- Pom Klementieff – After Him
- Zoë Kravitz – No Reservations
- Caleb Landry Jones – No Country for Old Men
- John Magaro – The Brave One
- Craig Robinson – D-War
- Saoirse Ronan – I Could Never Be Your Woman
- Andy Samberg – Hot Rod
- Emma Stone – Superbad
- Jason Sudeikis – The Ten
- Katherine Waterston – Michael Clayton
