= The Spine (film) =

- Two DVD set that contains the film
- Directed by: Chris Landreth
- Written by: Chris Landreth
- Produced by: Steve Hoban; Marcy Page
- Starring: Gordon Pinsent; Alberta Watson
- Edited by: Yonah Lewis; Jeremy Montgomery
- Music by: Kirk Elliott
- Animation by: Seneca College
- Production companies: Copperheart Entertainment; C.O.R.E.; National Film Board of Canada; Dolby; Autodesk; Seneca College; Gumby; Poppetstown
- Distributed by: National Film Board of Canada
- Release date: June 8, 2009 (Annecy)
- Running time: 11 minutes
- Country: Canada
- Language: English

The Spine is a 2009 animated short film by Chris Landreth about a married dysfunctional couple, created in Landreth's "psycho realist" style, in which characters' mental states are reflected in their physical appearance. Voices for the couple were supplied by Gordon Pinsent and Alberta Watson.

Landreth has explained his animation style as "a kind of surrealistic portrayal of real people and what I do with the surrealistic part is to make people's emotional, psychological and spiritual state kind of very evident on their faces and in their body so that they look …scarred in a way that reflects their history."

The Spine was produced by the National Film Board of Canada in association with Copperheart Animation and C.O.R.E. Digital Pictures, with the creative participation of Autodesk Canada and Seneca College's School of Communication Arts. It is Landreth's second film with Copper Heart and the NFB, having won the 2004 Academy Award for Animated Short Film and the 25th Genie Award for Best Animated Short for his previous work, Ryan.

== Production ==
Producing The Spine took two years, with the first year devoted mainly to development. The film was a more ambitious project technically than Ryan, and so required a much larger production team. Animators from Seneca College, which had been involved in Ryan, played a much larger role in the making of The Spine, with Seneca College people doing "about 95% of the animation," according to Landreth. Seneca professor Sean Craig, who had worked on Ryan as a student, was an animation director on The Spine. The film also utilized the input of C.O.R.E., including a team that did most of the computer rendering. The film was principally created using Autodesk Maya and Houdini 3D software.

The screenplay for The Spine was written by Landreth while enrolled in a professional screenwriting workshop at Ryerson Polytechnic University. Some of the story was based on what he'd seen, 20 years earlier, at a group therapy session for couples, where it seemed to Landreth that portraying a dysfunctional relationship would make for an interesting story. It took Landreth just two hours to put the outline together, but completing the story took a year. The Ryerson workshop helped Landreth to flesh out his story and as of 2009, he continues to meet with his writing group once a month. Landreth also credits the production teams from the National Film Board and Copperheart for their creative input.

== Release ==
The Spine had its world premiere at the Annecy International Animated Film Festival, followed by a North American premiere at the Worldwide Short Film Festival in Toronto. In August 2009, Landreth presented the film at SIGGRAPH in New Orleans.

== Reception ==
Scott Hill of Wired.com called it "a freakish array of human drama" that will "blow minds".

The Spine received the award for the best film at the Melbourne International Animation Festival, and was named best animated short at the Nashville Film Festival. It was also nominated for the Genie Award for Best Animated Short at the 30th Genie Awards.
