= Bingo (1998 film) =

1998 animated short film by Chris Landreth

- Directed by: Chris Landreth
- Written by: Greg Kotis
- Produced by: Penny Wilson; Kevin Tureski; Andy Jones
- Starring: David Kodeski; Phil Ridarelli; Diana Slickman; Stephanie Shaw; Dave Awl; Greg Allen
- Edited by: Craig Clarke; Matt Lyon
- Music by: Jim LaMarche
- Distributed by: Alias|Wavefront
- Release date: March 31, 1998
- Running time: 5 min 35 sec
- Country: Canada
- Language: English

Bingo is a 1998 animated short film directed by Chris Landreth. The short is based on the stage play Disregard This Play by the theater troupe The Neo Futurists. It uses surrealistic imagery and dialogue to tell the story of an ordinary man who is surrounded by characters who insist that he is someone named "Bingo the Clown" even though he is not. Eventually, the man is worn down by their unwavering insistence and comes to believe that he is Bingo the Clown.

At the time of Bingo's creation, Landreth was employed as an animator at Alias|Wavefront, and the film was used to demonstrate the capabilities of the company's new Maya animation software.

== Plot ==
The film opens with a live-action footage of the Neo-Futurists performing the excerpt of Disregard This Play before a live audience. A man in a strange hat greets a man sitting in a chair and addresses him as "Bingo". When the man in the chair denies being named Bingo, the man in the hat insists that he was, in fact, "Bingo the Clown-o". As the man in the chair tries to correct him, the man in the hat continues to address him more loudly from cutting off the protests. This was removed from a Vimeo upload by the film’s director.

After the footage, it opens the scene in computer-generated imagery. A man, "Dave," is sitting in a chair under a spotlight and surrounded by darkness. A clown enters, smoking a cigarette, and addresses Dave as "Bingo." Dave starts to protest that he's not "Bingo the Clown," but the clown ignores him and repeats the phrases "Hi, Bingo!" and "Bingo the Clown!" With each repetition, the clown's voice gets louder and he grows physically larger until he is screaming at Dave with a head larger than Dave's entire body.

A female harlequin enters, calling for "Music, please!" As she exits, the stage is illuminated with an instrumental rendition of "In The Good Old Summer Time" playing in the background. Strange screens rise up from under the floor and begin displaying a series of seemingly random images interspersed with pictures of clowns and the words "Hi Bingo!" At the same time, the clown begins riding a bicycle in circles around Dave while balancing a piano on one hand, and Dave is bombarded with peanuts.

The harlequin descends from the ceiling and orders the music to stop. As she exits, the music stops and the lights dim, leaving Dave alone in a spotlight once again. A little girl clown enters, holding a balloon that keeps bursting and re-inflating in new colors. She addresses Dave as "Bingo" and warns him that "he" is coming to "check on your progress." When Dave asks if Bingo is the one who is coming, the balloon girl's face transforms into a gigantic, snake-like monster and she shouts that Dave is Bingo. She then turns immediately back into a little girl to inform Dave that "he" is coming. The first clown walks through the spotlight, still carrying the piano in one hand, and drops his bicycle beside Dave's chair before leaving.

The balloon girl calls Dave "Bingo" again, and when he tries to protest, he is interrupted by the harlequin shouting "Music, please!" again. The music begins playing again, and the screens also reappear, but are soon replaced by enormous, robotic faces. The balloon girl drifts away on a giant balloon, and a human-sized flea walks past with a sign announcing "The Money Guy." The harlequin returns briefly and orders the music to stop before disappearing.

When the music stops, there is a strange creature with no legs, many arms, a man's head, and dollar bills sprouting from its neck and arms. It yells at Dave for "looking at my money," but then offers to let Dave look at his money. Confused and frightened, Dave declares that yes, he would like to look at the creature's money. The creature congratulates him for being a "good little Bingo." Dave says that he doesn't think that he's Bingo, asking "who am I?"

The harlequin once again calls for music. This time, the lighting does not change, but the money creature is wheeled away as music plays and then fades out. Left alone, Dave says that maybe he is "Bingo" after all. The clown reappears, sitting in an easy chair, wearing glasses, with an axe embedded in his head. The clown asks Dave to confirm that he is "Bingo the Clown." Dave agrees, stating enthusiastically that he is "Bingo, Bingo the Clown-o!" He stands up and starts dancing around while shaking a baby's rattle.

The lights come on, fully illuminating the room, and a voice on a loudspeaker says "Thank you. Next." The screen cuts in black, following the credits.

== Technology ==
Bingo was created with a pre-release version of Alias|Wavefront's Maya computer graphics and animation software. The Maya software and the film were developed concurrently at Alias|Wavefront, and the company used the finished film as a demonstration of the software's capabilities.

Some of the Maya features that were showcased in Bingo included blend shapes, custom shaders, rigid and soft body dynamics, particle systems, and interactive lighting setups.

== Festivals and awards ==
Bingo was shown at both technology trade shows, like the 1998 SIGGRAPH conference where it was shown as the grand finale of the Electronic Theater, and at more traditional film festivals. Some notable film festivals that showed Bingo during its initial release include the Sundance Film Festival, the Ottawa International Animation Festival, Toronto's CFC Worldwide Short Film Festival, the Aspen Short Film Festival, and the Los Angeles Independent Film Festival.

The film received critical acclaim upon its release. Landreth did not submit Bingo to the Sundance Film Festival, but the festival organizers asked to show it anyway — a rare honor. At the Aspen Short Film Festival it won the "Animated Eye" award, it won the Audience Award for Best Short Film at the Los Angeles Independent Film Festival, and it won the Media Prize for Best Computer Animation at the Ottawa International Animation Festival.

In 1999, Bingo was given the Genie Award for Best Animated Short.
