= Aspen Shortsfest =

Short film festival in Aspen, Colorado

- Location: Aspen, Colorado, United States
- Founded: 1992
- Hosted by: Aspen Film
- Language: International
- Website: aspenfilm.org/our-festivals/shortsfest/

The Aspen Shortsfest is an annual Oscar-qualifying film festival held in Aspen, Colorado. It is run by Aspen Film, which has also run the feature film festival, Aspen Filmfest, since 1979.

== History and description ==
Aspen Film was founded by Ellen Kohner Hunt in 1979, which began hosting the annual Aspen Filmfest of feature films in that year. Aspen Films also hosts the Shortsfest, whose inaugural edition was held in 1993.

Aspen Shortsfest is an annual Oscar-qualifying short film festival held in Aspen, Colorado.

== Past winners ==
In 2003, director Lionel Bailliu was given the Shortsfest Award for the 2002 French short film called Squash.

In 2004, director Taika Waititi was given the Aspen Shortsfest Best Drama Award for the 2004 New Zealand short film called Two Cars, One Night.

== See also ==
- List of Short Film Festivals
