= Shane Smith (producer) =

Australian-Canadian executive

Shane Smith is an Australian-Canadian film and television executive, currently a programmer and producer of documentary films for TVOntario. Prior to joining TVOntario in 2024, he was a programmer for the Hot Docs Canadian International Documentary Festival from 2015 to 2023, holding the role of artistic director of the festival in 2022 and 2023.

He should not be confused with the Shane Smith associated with Vice Media.

Born and raised in Australia, he is a graduate of Macquarie University, and moved to Canada in 1996.

He previously served as a programmer for the Inside Out Film and Video Festival, director of the CFC Worldwide Short Film Festival, and director of special projects with the Toronto International Film Festival. He has written film reviews for Xtra Magazine and Cinema Scope, and has worked as a programmer for Silver Screen Classics.

While with TIFF he was regular programmer of the Short Cuts lineup, and returned for the 2024 Toronto International Film Festival as a member of the Short Cuts award jury.
