= Squash (film) =

- Directed by: Lionel Bailliu
- Written by: Lionel Bailliu
- Produced by: Gilles de Maistre; Jérôme Cornuau; Miguel Courtois
- Starring: Malcolme Conrath; Eric Savin
- Cinematography: Thierry Deschamp
- Edited by: Vincent Tabaillon
- Music by: Denis Penot
- Production company: Tétra Média
- Release date: 2002
- Running time: 27 min.
- Country: France
- Language: French

Squash is a 2002 French short film (27 min / 29 min runtime) directed and written by Lionel Bailliu. The film has won multiple awards at film festivals and was nominated for an Academy Award in the Best Live Action Short Film category in 2004. The film stars Malcolme Conrath as 'Alexandre' and Eric Savin as 'Charles'.

It was used as the basis for a longer film (103 Minutes) called Fair Play in 2006. The opening scene of the long feature are complete repeats of the short film, but with actor Malcolm Conrath is replaced by Jérémie Rénier to play 'Alexandre'.

== Synopsis ==
Squash depicts an increasingly aggressive squash game between two businessmen, Alexandre and his boss, Charles. The game is presented as a metaphor for office politics.

== Awards and nominations ==
List of awards and nominations
Year	Award	Category	Result
2002	Cork Film Festival (Corona, Ireland)	Audience Prize for Best International Short Film	Won
2002	Montecatini International Short Film Festival (Italy)	(3 Awards) - Golden Heron - Best Movie, Award for Best Actor: Éric Savin and Award for Best Actor: Malcolm Conrath	Won
2002	Valencia International Film Festival (Spain)	Luna de Valencia for Best Short Movie	Won
2002	Message to Man (Russia)	Mention from the International Competition Jury	Won
2002	Brussels Short Film Festival (Belgium)	International Audience Prize	Won
2002	Clermont-Ferrand International Short Film Festival (France)	(2 Awards) - Adami Prize for Best Actor: Malcolm Conrath and Éric Savin	Won
2002	Regensburg Short Film Week (Germany)	Award	Won
2002	Abitibi-Temiscamingue Film Festival (Rouyn-Noranda) (Canada)	'Jury Special Mention' award	Won
2003	CFC Worldwide Short Film Festival (Toronto, Canada)	Award for Best Fiction	Won
2003	Aspen Shortsfest (United States)	Award to Lionel Bailliu	Won
2003	Flickerfest (Australia)	Award	Won
2003	Cesar Awards (France)	Best Short Film	Nominated

It also was given the Lutin Award for Best Editing to Vincent Tabaillon.
