= Secret Agents (film) =

- Directed by: Frédéric Schoendoerffer
- Written by: Yann Brion; Jean Cosmos; Olivier Douyère; Frédéric Schoendoerffer; Ludovic Schoendoerffer
- Produced by: Éric Névé; Francisco Ramos; Catherine Lapoujade; Jean Louis Porchet
- Starring: Vincent Cassel; Monica Bellucci; André Dussollier
- Cinematography: Jean-Pierre Sauvaire
- Edited by: Irene Blecua
- Music by: Bruno Coulais
- Production companies: La Chauve Souris; Carcharodon; TF1 Films Production; 120 Films; Gimages; Alquimia Cinema; Medusa Film; Canal+; TPS Star
- Distributed by: TFM Distribution
- Release date: 31 March 2004
- Running time: 109 minutes
- Country: France
- Language: French
- Budget: $14.6 million
- Box office: $6.3 million

Secret Agents (French: Agents Secrets), also released as Spy Bound, is a 2004 French crime film directed by Frédéric Schoendoerffer.

== Plot ==
A man steps off a ferry. Suspicious he is being watched, he ducks through traffic and avoids his pursuers long enough to swallow a microchip and flee in a car. Unable to elude them, he is rammed off the road and shot, but his murderers are unable to find the microchip. Back in France his body is scanned by intelligence chief Colonel Grasset and team. As a result, Grasset gathers DGSE field agents, Loic, Rayond and Brissaeu, and introduces them to Tony, a 'company guest' and deep sea expert who will support their next mission to Morocco. Their debriefing includes France's motives behind the mission: France plans to stop an Estonian arms dealer from collaborating with Angolan rebels leveraging the country's diamond mines for Civil War weapons.

Laying the groundwork in Geneva, is female agent Lisa. Disguised as a babysitter, she drugs the two children so she can find and photograph their father's documents. Once completed, she joins Brissaeu in their new cover as husband and wife vacationers to Morocco. From the start, their team are not alone, a suspicious pair of females engage Loic and Raymond poolside, whereas Lisa is harassed by a US spy to abort the mission. The team receive instructions to move forward as planned, and although they sink a ship carrying ammunition, Lisa is arrested at the Swiss border and Raymond is murdered in his hotel. Who is behind these events and why becomes the knot Brisseau must unravel with help from the spy community.

== Cast ==
- Vincent Cassel as George Brisseau
- Monica Bellucci as Barbara / Lisa
- André Dussollier as Colonel Grasset
- Charles Berling as Eugène
- Bruno Todeschini as Homme maigre en civil
- Sergio Peris-Mencheta as Raymond
- Ludovic Schoendoerffer as Loic
- Eric Savin as Tony
- Najwa Nimri as Maria Menendez
- Rosanna Walls as Maria's friend
- Beatrice Kessler as Helena Standler
- Jo Prestia as Gianni
- Serge Avedikian as Igor Lipovsky
- Gabrielle Lazure as Véronique Lipovsky
- Simón Andreu as Maître Deligny

`
