= After All (film) =

2006 Canadian short film

- French: Après tout
- Directed by: Alexis Fortier Gauthier
- Written by: Géraldine Charbonneau
- Produced by: Élaine Hébert
- Starring: Catherine De Léan; Rémi-Pierre Paquin
- Cinematography: Philippe Roy
- Edited by: Martin Thibeault
- Production company: Institut national de l'image et du son
- Release date: 2006
- Running time: 14 minutes
- Country: Canada
- Language: French

After All (French: Après tout) is a Canadian drama short film, directed by Alexis Fortier Gauthier and released in 2006. The film stars Catherine De Léan as Claire, a woman who decides, after having consumed too much alcohol, to go visit her ex-boyfriend Philippe (Rémi-Pierre Paquin) for the first time since their breakup.

The film won the Genie Award for Best Live Action Short Drama at the 28th Genie Awards, as well as the award for Best Canadian Short Film at the 2007 CFC Worldwide Short Film Festival.
