= CFC Worldwide Short Film Festival =

Annual film festival in Toronto, Canada (1994–2012)

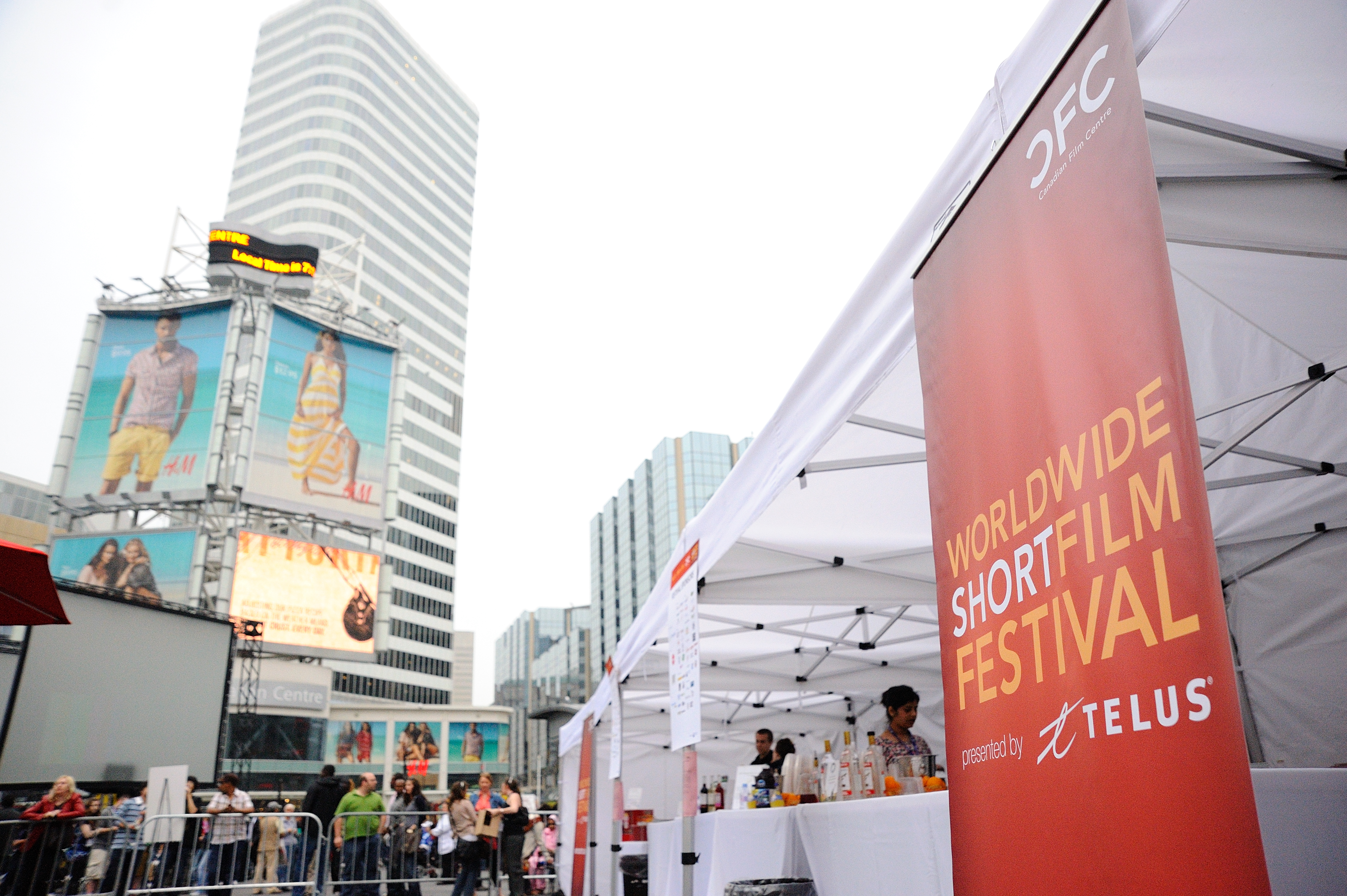
The CFC Worldwide Short Film Festival 2011 in Yonge-Dundas Square (now Sankofa Square), Toronto

The Canadian Film Centre's Worldwide Short Film Festival (WSFF), founded by Brenda Sherwood in 1994, was an annual film festival held over several days in Toronto, Ontario, in June, at The Annex-Yorkville area venues; including the Bloor Cinema, the University of Toronto, and the Isabel Bader Theatre, among others. As well as film screenings, the festival hosted parties and the CFC's annual picnic.

The WSFF held accreditation, and was recognized as a qualifying event for the Academy of Motion Picture Arts and Sciences, the Academy of Canadian Cinema and Television, and the British Academy of Film and Television Arts (BAFTA) short film awards. This means that certain award-winners at the WSFF were eligible to be nominated for the Oscars, Genies, and BAFTAs awards.

In 2012, the festival received 4,768 submissions from 113 countries, making it the largest short film festival in North America at that time. The festival was described in the Canadian Encyclopedia as "a popular and productive meeting place for audiences, filmmakers, buyers and sellers interested in the art and commerce of making movies in short form", and this was reflected in the Short Films Big Ideas Symposium, which featured master classes and panel discussions focused on professional development for those involved in the industry.

Each year the festival offered a celebrity program, which featured films with actors such as Scott Thompson, Judi Dench, David Duchovny, Michael Fassbender, Max von Sydow, Natalie Portman, Dick Van Dyke, Don Cheadle, Will Ferrell, John C. Reilly, Crispin Glover, Gérard Depardieu, Stephen Fry, and Anthony Hopkins, among others. The festival also screened films by celebrity directors, including Errol Morris, Spike Jonze, Rachel Weisz, Talmage Cooley, Courteney Cox, and Joseph Gordon-Levitt. In addition to the annual screenings in June, the festival also ran a monthly screening series called A World of Shorts.

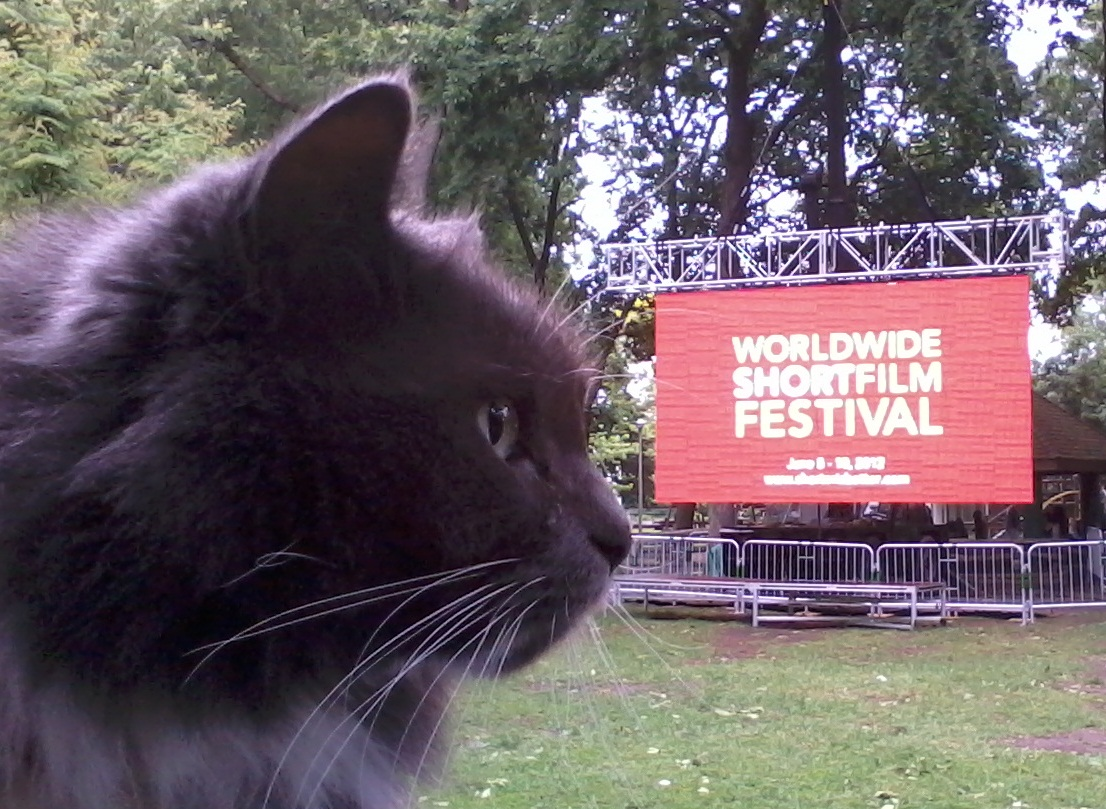
The Festival Mascot, Miel, watches over the 2012 launch in Dufferin Grove Park

== History ==
The Worldwide Short Film Festival was founded in 1994, and operated independently under the direction of Brenda Sherwood until 2000, when the Festival was acquired by the Canadian Film Centre (CFC). The Centre brought some professional expertise to the venture: Wayne Clarkson, the CFC's executive director, who was the former head of the Toronto International Film Festival (TIFF), from 1978 to 1985.

Brenda Sherwood was replaced as festival director by Shane Smith (2000-2006). Sherwood continued to serve on the festival advisory committee for 2001 festival season. Since 2001, under the direction of Shane Smith, the CFC-WSFF attendance doubled to over 15,000, and submissions increased to over 4,200. The CFC-WSFF also hosted the largest digital marketplace for short films in North America.

Several CFC-WSFF juried short films went on to be nominated for Academy Awards. A few, like Chris Landreth's animated documentary Ryan, won the 2004 Oscar for Best Animated Short Film, and the 25th Genie Award for Best Animated Short. Other Oscar winners include Harvie Krumpet by Adam Elliot (2003), Wasp by Andrea Arnold (2004) and The Danish Poet by Torill Kove (2006).

== IMAX Exhibition ==
From 2004-to-2006, Festival Director Shane Smith, and festival researcher Peter Hasek pursued the idea of curating a 45-minute presentation of large format IMAX 15/70mm short films. This presentation was to have been screened at one of the IMAX theaters in downtown Toronto, as part of the CFC-WSFF program. The effort had support from Kodak Canada and the English Animation Department of the National Film Board of Canada. The event was to be promoted with tongue-in-cheek, but in fact, as "the only presentation at the Worldwide Short Film Festival that actually uses film."

With only a dozen-or-so 15/70mm short films in existence, the long-term plan was to create a boutique distribution service and "circuit" for large format short films; with each festival offering its own pro-rated "audience choice" cash award system. The goal was to create a reliable source of income for large format short film makers.

The debut screening of the 15/70mm large format short film platter was to have been held during the Worldwide Short Film Festival, at one of the IMAX theaters in downtown Toronto in June, 2006 followed by a screening for the Cinéfest Sudbury International Film Festival, at the Science North IMAX Theater in Sudbury, Ontario in September, 2006.

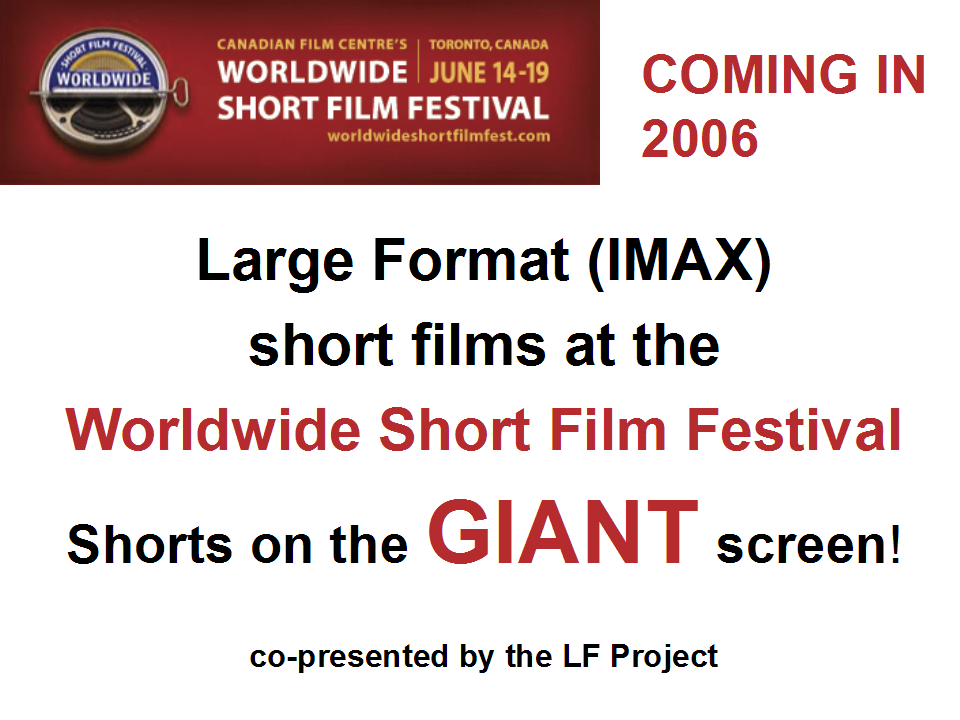
Promotional sign for the LF Project: a screening of large format, 15/70mm (IMAX) short films, on display at the 2005 Worldwide Short Film Festival. For references on the Large Format Project and the production of 15/70mm short films, see these on-line archives:

Following these two festival screenings, the 15/70mm platter was destined for on-going, for-profit screenings at the Western Fair IMAX Theater in London, Ontario in exchange for their help with the project. The Western Fair IMAX projection room and other facilities were to be used for print traffic co-ordination and revision work needed to assemble a 45-minute presentation of 15/70mm short films.

There were tentative plans for screening this ad hoc platter of 15/70mm short films at other IMAX theaters in Canada, and the United States, wherever the local IMAX theater had a strong partnership with their local, mainstream film festival that was similar to the working arrangement and relationship between the Cinéfest group and Science North, in Sudbury, Ontario.

This plan fell through over time when:

1. The Western Fair IMAX Theater in London, Ontario ceased operations in September 2005.
2. The IMAX theaters in downtown Toronto wanted up to $2000/hour in theater rental fees to prepare and host a 15/70mm short film festival event, making the event unrealistic and unaffordable for CFC-WSFF organizers and patrons. And neither the Famous Players IMAX in downtown Toronto or the Cinesphere IMAX at Ontario Place were able to provide print maintenance and on-site storage for the duration of the project, April–June 2006. (At the time, most film festival entries were submitted on DVD; a reel or platter of large format (IMAX) 70mm 15-perf short films can weigh 100 kilograms or more, and requires the use of a forklift truck to move the platter from shipping dock to storage room to projection room.)
3. The IMAX corporate office in Santa Monica, California let it be known, throughout the IMAX theater network, that the corporation did not support the idea of a large format, 15/70mm short film circuit for its theaters, and that the corporation's priority (circa 2004–05) was the re-purposing of mainstream Hollywood feature films for use in IMAX theaters. The official IMAX distribution model consists of packaging existing IMAX feature films and selling them at a deep discount, so the WSFF's conventional festival model might have been in competition with their commercial goals.
4. The loss of the project's principals: WSFF Director Shane Smith left the festival, and festival researcher Peter Hasek was diagnosed with cancer.

In the end, it was determined that the scope and human resource requirements of The LF Project was so wide and deep, it would require the formation of a separate, double bottom line non-profit organization in order to fully develop, implement and maintain the goal, set forth by Shane Smith and Peter Hasek, of curating a traveling presentation of IMAX short films that was both manageable and financially sustainable.

Shane Smith retired as festival director of the CFC-WSFF after the 2006 festival season, and was replaced by former print traffic coordinator, Eileen Arandiga, who is currently the Director of Partnerships and Events at the Canadian Film Centre. Shane Smith is currently the Toronto Film Festival's Director of Special Projects.

In early 2013, the Canadian Film Centre began a re-evaluation of its public activities. As part of this re-evaluation process, the CFC Worldwide Short Film Festival was put on hiatus.

== Previous award winners ==
=== Academy Awards Oscars qualifications, nominations and wins ===
Up until the 2012 film festival season, and the 2013 hiatus, the Canadian Film Centre's Worldwide Short Film Festival offered two Academy-accredited awards. Winners of the Best Animated Short award and the Deluxe Award for Best Live-Action Short qualify to be nominated for an Oscar. From 2001-to-2012, the following short films were screened at the Worldwide Short Film Festival, and were later nominated for an Oscar.

- 2003 - Best Animated Short: Harvie Krumpet, directed by Adam Elliot. WINNER at the 76th Academy Awards (2004 ceremony for motion picture productions released in 2003)
- 2003 - Best Live Action Short: Squash, directed by Lionel Bailliu. Nominated for the 76th Academy Awards (2004 ceremony for motion picture productions released in 2003)
- 2004 - Best Animated Short: Ryan, directed by Chris Landreth. WINNER at the 77th Academy Awards (2005 ceremony for motion picture productions released in 2004)
- 2004 - Best Documentary Short: Hardwood, by Hubert Davis and Erin Faith Young. Nominated for the 77th Academy Awards (2005 ceremony for motion picture productions released in 2004)
- 2004 - Best Live Action Short: Wasp, directed by Andrea Arnold. WINNER at the 77th Academy Awards (2005 ceremony for motion picture productions released in 2004)
- 2005 - Best Animated Short: The Mysterious Geographic Explorations of Jasper Morello, by Anthony Lucas. Nominated for the 78th Academy Awards (2006 ceremony for motion picture productions released in 2005)
- 2006 - Best Animated Short: The Danish Poet, by Torill Kove. WINNER at the 79th Academy Awards (2007 ceremony for motion picture productions released in 2006)
- 2007 - Best Animated Short: Madame Tutli-Putli, by Chris Lavis and Maciek Szczerbowski. Nominated for the 80th Academy Awards (2008 ceremony for motion picture productions released in 2007)
- 2010 - Best Animated Short: The Gruffalo, by Jacob Schuh and Max Lang. Nominated for the 83rd Academy Awards (2011 ceremony for motion picture productions released in 2010)

=== Audience Choice ===
- 2001 – Dual Citizen, directed by Christy Garland, Canada
- 2002 – Three Sisters on Moon Lake, directed by Julie Kwan, Canada
- 2003 – The School, directed by Jonathan Hayes, Ontario
- 2004 – Creature Comforts, Cats or Dogs?, animated by Richard Goleszowski, UK
- 2005 – Invulnerable, directed by Alvaro Pastor, Spain
- 2006 – The Legend of the Scarecrow, directed by Marco Bezas, Spain
- 2007 – It's My Turn Now, directed by Jorgen Hjerdt, Sweden
- 2008 – Out of Spjald (Vaek fra Spjald), directed by Thomas Glud & Lars Wass, Denmark
- 2009 – Paul Rondin Is... Paul Rondin (Paul Rondin est... Paul Rondin), directed by Frédéric Vin, France
- 2010 – Luxury (Luksus), directed by Jaroslaw Sztandera, Poland
- 2011 – The Gruffalo, directed by Jakob Schuh & Max Lang, UK, Germany
- 2012 – Unravel, directed by Meghna Gupta, India, UK

=== Best Emerging Canadian Filmmaker ===
- 2005 – Jeffrey St. Jules for The Sadness of Johnson Joe Jangles, Ontario
- 2006 – Chris Nash for Day of John, Ontario
- 2006 – Maxime Giroux for Red (Le rouge au sol), Quebec
- 2007 – Nicolas Roy for Sunday (Petit dimanche), Canada
- 2008 – Audrey Cummings for Burgeon and Fade, Ontario
- 2009 – Aparna Kapur for Amma, Canada
- 2010 – J.B. Sugar for Wood If, Canada

=== The Bravo!FACT Award for Best Canadian Short ===
- 2001 – Killing Time, directed by Tara Johns, Quebec
- 2002 – Remembrance, directed by Stephanie Morgenstern
- 2003 – The Truth About Head, directed by Dale Heslip, Ontario
- 2004 – Ryan, directed by Chris Landreth, Ontario
- 2005 – Through My Thick Glasses, directed by Pjotr Sapegin, Quebec
- 2006 – Noise, directed by Greg Spottiswood, Ontario
- 2007 – After All (Après tout), directed by Alexis Fortier, Quebec
- 2008 – Can You Wave Bye-Bye?, directed by Sarah Galea-Davis
- 2009 – Land of Men (Terre des hommes), directed by Ky Nam Le Duc
- 2010 – Fishes (Les poissons), directed by Jean Malek
- 2011 – Cold Blood (Sang froid), directed by Martin Thibaudeau
- 2012 – Edmond Was a Donkey (Edmond était un âne) directed by Franck Dion

=== The Deluxe Award for Best Live-Action Short ===
- 2001 – To See a Boat in Sail, directed by Anja Breien, Norway
- 2002 – Bamboleho, directed by Luis Prieto, Spain
- 2003 – Squash, directed by Lionel Bailliu, France
- 2004 – Wasp, directed by Andrea Arnold, United Kingdom
- 2005 – Before I Go, directed by Heiko Hahn, Germany
- 2006 – Bawke, directed by Hisham Zaman, Norway
- 2007 – Soft, directed by Simon Ellis, UK
- 2008 – Manon on the Asphalt (Manon sur le bitume), directed by Elizabeth Marre & Olivier Pont, France
- 2009 – My Name is Dominic (Tous les enfants s'appelent Dominique), directed by Nicolas Silhol, France
- 2010 – Over the Fence (Viiko Ennen Vappua), directed by Hamy Ramezan, Finland
- 2011 – Aglaée, directed by Rudi Rosenberg, France
- 2012 – The Factory (A fábrica) directed by Aly Muritiba, Brazil

=== The Kodak Award for Best Cinematography in a Canadian Short ===
- 2002 – Lara Fitzgerald for Scenes from Childhood
- 2003 – Steve Asselin for Clearing Skies (Une éclaircie sur le fleuve)
- 2004 – Nicolas Roy for Leo
- 2005 – James Cooper for Lepidultrous
- 2006 – Tess Girard for Benediction
- 2007 – Phillipe Roy for After All (Après tout)
- 2008 – Brendan Steacy for The Answer Key
- 2009 – Miroslaw Baszak for The Water, directed by Kevin Drew
- 2010 – Maya Bankovic for Slip
- 2011 – Ian Lagarde for Nowhere Elsewhere (Au milieu de nulle part ailleurs)
- 2012 – Christophe Collette for Gravity of Center

=== Best Animated Short ===
- 2001 – The Man with the Beautiful Eyes, directed by Jonathan Hodgson, UK
- 2002 – Home Road Movies, directed by Robert Bradbrook, UK
- 2003 – Fast Film, directed by Virgil Widrich, Austria/Luxembourg
- 2004 – Harvie Krumpet, directed by Adam Elliot, Australia
- 2005 – The Mysterious Geographic Explorations of Jasper Morello, directed by Anthony Lucas, Australia
- 2006 – The Danish Poet, directed by Torill Kove, Canada/Norway
- 2007 – Madame Tutli-Putli, directed by Maciek Szczerbowski and Chris Lavis, Canada
- 2008 – Boar Attack, directed by Jay White, Canada
- 2009 – Slaves (Slavar), directed by Hanna Heilborn & David Aronowitsch, Sweden & Denmark
- 2010 – The Silence Beneath the Bark (Les silence sous l'ecorce), directed by Joanna Lurie, France
- 2011 – The Tannery, directed by Iain Gardner, UK
- 2012 – The Maker, directed by Christopher Kezelos, Australia

=== The Panasonic Award for Best Documentary Short ===
- 2012 - Eighty Eight, directed by Sebastian Feehan, Josh Bamford, UK

=== Best Experimental Short ===
- 2001 – Copy Shop, directed by Virgil Widrich, Austria
- 2002 – Eve, directed by Britt Randle, Canada
- 2003 – Islands, directed by Richard Fung, Ontario
- 2004 – The Paper Wall, directed by Nicholas & Sheila Pye, Quebec
- 2005 – Spacer, directed by Guy Roland, British Columbia
- 2006 – Film Noir, directed by Osbert Parker, UK
- 2007 – The Nautical Education, directed by Christian Laurence, Canada
- 2008 – Roastbeef, directed by François Bégin and Miryam Bouchard, Canada
- 2009 – Danse Macabre, directed by Pedro Pires, Canada
- 2010 – Slip, directed by Chelsea McMullan, Canada
- 2011 – The Death of an Insect (Erään Hyönteisen Tuho), directed by Hannes Vartiainen and Pekka Veikkolainen, Finland
- 2012 – Gravity of Center, directed by Thibaut Duverneix, Canada

=== The Deluxe Award for Best Performance in a Live-Action Short ===
- 2008 – Death of Shula, Yosef Corman-Korman, Israel
- 2010 – A Parachute Falling in Siberia, Noni Hazlehurst, Anthony Phelan, Australia
- 2011 – Fathermotherchild (Vatermutterkind), Aline Kolditz and Lea Kolditz
- 2012 – My Sweetheart (Mon amoureux), Miss Ming, France

=== Screenplay Giveaway ===
- 2001 – Masterpiece Monday, Glenn Forbes
- 2003 – Gold, Armen J. Kazazian
- 2004 – Scarlet Runners, Teresa Hannigan
- 2005 – The Contest, Naoko Kumagai
- 2006 – Funky Prairie Boy, Michael Schultz
- 2007 – The Bridge, Lindsey Connell
- 2008 – Big Head, Dylan Akio Smith
- 2009 – She Said Lenny, Kate Hewlett
- 2010 – Last Christmas, Geoffrey Redknap
- 2011 - Sam and Rea's Fault, Jason Hreno
- 2012 – Static, Tanya Lemke

=== Funding Forum Pitch Prize ===
- 2001 – Firster's Dungeon, Sophie Hargest
- 2007 – Where Do White People Go When the Long Weekend Comes? The Wondrous Journey of Delroy Kincaid, Powys Dewhurst; Belonging, Elizabeth Lazebnik
