= Lipsett Diaries =

- Film poster
- Directed by: Theodore Ushev
- Written by: Chris Robinson
- Produced by: Marc Bertrand
- Starring: Samuel Jacques; Jarvis Robinson Neall
- Narrated by: Xavier Dolan
- Edited by: Oana Suteu; Theodore Ushev
- Production company: NFB
- Release date: June 2010 (Animafest Zagreb)
- Running time: 14 minutes
- Country: Canada
- Language: French

Lipsett Diaries (French: Les journaux de Lipsett) is a 2010 short animated documentary film about the life and art of collage filmmaker Arthur Lipsett, animated and directed by Theodore Ushev and written by Chris Robinson. The 14-minute film was produced by the National Film Board of Canada in Montreal, where Lipsett had worked from 1958 to 1972, before committing suicide in 1986. The film is narrated by Xavier Dolan.

== Inspiration ==
Ushev was inspired to make a film about Lipsett, after Robinson had forwarded him an email where the late filmmaker was discussed. Until that point, Ushev had never heard of Lipsett. He began to do some research and was surprised to learn that Lipsett had lived on the same street as him in Montreal. Ushev went to the building where Lipsett once lived and met with the concierge, who showed him a locker where belongings from former tenants were stored. There, Ushev discovered a small blue notebook with "Lipsett" written on it, containing notes by the late filmmaker.

== Production ==
The film was animated by hand-painting the frames, using computer editing to link the images. Ushev estimated that 40 frames were painted per day during production. Lipsett Diaries was Robinson's first attempt at screenwriting.

== Reception ==
Lipsett Diaries received the Genie Award for Best Animated Short at the 31st Genie Awards. In June 2011, it received three awards at the 2011 Golden Sheaf Awards: for Animation, the Founders' Award, and Best of Festival.

Lipsett Diaries also received a Special Jury Award at the Annecy International Animation Film Festival, a Special International Jury Prize at the Hiroshima International Animation Festival, an audience award at the Melbourne International Animation Festival, Best Canadian Film at the Ottawa International Animation Festival, special mentions at the Bravo!FACT Awards and Worldwide Short Film Festival in Toronto, Best Animated Film at Clermont-Ferrand Short Film Festival, and the grand prize at the Rencontres internationales du cinéma d'animation in Wissembourg.

At the end of 2010, the film was included in the Toronto International Film Festival's Top 10 Canadian films of the year.
