= Ryan Larkin =

Canadian animator, artist, and sculptor (1943–2007)

- Born: July 31, 1943; Dorval, Quebec, Canada
- Died: February 14, 2007 (aged 63); Saint-Hyacinthe, Quebec, Canada
- Occupations: Film director Animator
- Years active: 1964–2007

Ryan Larkin (July 31, 1943 – February 14, 2007) was a Canadian animator, artist, and sculptor who rose to fame with the psychedelic Oscar-nominated short Walking (1968) and the acclaimed Street Musique (1972). He was the subject of the Oscar-winning film Ryan.

Born in Dorval, a small suburb city in Montreal, the middle child of two siblings, the son of an airplane mechanic father and a secretary mother. Larkin was known for his remarkable understanding and replication of human movement in his work. Instead of rotoscoping Larkin relied on self-study and references to perfect his work. He was also known for his psychedelic and diverse range of animation techniques and mediums, such as charcoal drawing, and Ink and color wash.

== Early life ==
Larkin had idolized his older brother, Ronald, whom he described as "the epitome of cool". In 1958, at the age of fifteen, Larkin witnessed his brother die in a boating accident and, because he had never learned to swim, was unable to save him. Larkin stated that his brother's death deeply scarred him.

Shortly after his brother's death, in search of new adventures, Larkin and one of his close friends decided to drop out of school and run from home to hitchhike around Canada, but this adventure was short-lived as they were quickly reported to the police and promptly picked up by Larkin's father the following day.

Following this incident, Larkin told his parents about his dislike of traditional high school and was able to convince them to allow him to go to the Montreal Museum of Fine Arts School with the condition that he would pay the tuition himself. For three summers, Larkin would work odd jobs to pay for tuition.

At the Art School of the Montreal Museum of Fine Arts Larkin studied under Arthur Lismer (a member of the Group of Seven) and quickly excelled at the school, being considered for a job at the National Film Board early on.

Eventually Larkin started work at the National Film Board of Canada in 1962.

== NFB years ==
At the National Film Board of Canada (NFB), Larkin learned animation techniques from the ground-breaking and award-winning animator Norman McLaren. He made two acclaimed short animated films, Syrinx (1965) and Cityscape (1966), before going on to create Walking (1968). Walking was nominated for an Academy Award in 1970 in the category Best Short Subject, Cartoon, but lost to It's Tough to Be a Bird by director Ward Kimball. Syrinx won many international awards. He went on to direct the award-winning short Street Musique, which premiered in 1972 and would be the last of his works, finished during his lifetime.

He also contributed art work and animation effects to NFB films including the 1974 feature Running Time, directed by Mort Ransen, in which Larkin also played three bit parts.

In 1975, the NFB commissioned Larkin to create a mural for the entrance foyer at its Montreal headquarters. Larkin delivered a piece featuring an adolescent boy with an erection, which the NFB removed from viewing. Larkin stated that "the mural was meant to be a satirical commentary on masculinity. At the time there was a year-long festival going on about women's rights. It was supposed to be a comical relief from all their terrible, self-conscious seriousness.".

Larkin left the NFB in 1982.

== Ryan, the film (2004) ==
In later years, Larkin was plagued by a downward spiral of drug abuse, alcoholism and homelessness. By this time, estranged from his parents, he had developed a routine of spending his nights at Montreal's Old Brewery Mission, and his days panhandling at Schwartz's Deli, eating at Mondo Fritz, drinking beer at the Copacabana bar, or reading a book in the lounge at Welch's used book store. In 2004, he was back in the limelight when a 14-minute animated documentary on his life, Ryan, by Canadian animator Chris Landreth, won the Academy Award for Animated Short Film and screened to acclaim at film festivals throughout the world. Alter Egos (2004), directed by Laurence Green, is a documentary about the making of Ryan that includes interviews with both Larkin and Chris Landreth as well as with various people who knew Larkin at the peak of his success.

== Later work ==
As of 2002, Larkin was working with composer Laurie Gordon of the band 'Chiwawa' on a new animated film entitled Spare Change, his first auteur film since working at the NFB. Together, they founded Spare Change Productions and sought funding for the film through Gordon's production company MusiVision. They received grants from Bravo!FACT, the Canada Council for the Arts and the Conseil des arts et des lettres du Québec and SODEC but were still short of financing. MusiVision and the National Film Board of Canada went into co-production only after Larkin's death.

Spare Change, which premiered at the Festival du Nouveau Cinema on October 9, 2008, features three Chiwawa tunes for which Larkin created storyboards and animation, including Do It For Me from the 2005 album Bright. The 2009 Chiwawa album Bus Stop Chinese Buffet include tracks from Spare Change; the lyrics of Overcast Skies were penned by Larkin.

MusiVision's Gordon and Nicola Zavaglia also produced the documentary film Ryan's Renaissance for CTV Television about Ryan's final years, his return to creating art, and Spare Change. Larkin, who had panhandled outside Montreal Schwartz's deli, appeared briefly in a documentary on the famous restaurant, Chez Schwartz, directed by Garry Beitel.

In December 2006, Larkin created three five-second bumpers for MTV in Canada, a preview to Spare Change. Each frame was hand-drawn. It was the first professional work he had executed in over 20 years. Larkin said that he had given up some bad habits, including drinking, in order to better focus on his animating career.

== Death ==
Larkin died in Saint-Hyacinthe, Quebec, on February 14, 2007, from lung cancer, which had spread to his brain.

== Personal life ==
It is speculated that Larkin was bisexual with writer Chris Robinson recalling Larkin saying the following in a conversation "She wanted sex twice a night. I was having sex with my gentleman friend and had only so much to give" (referring to an old girlfriend Larkin had). Robinson also brings up the fact that Larkin's mentor Norman McLaren was gay, and speculates that Larkin had an attraction to his mentor, but Larkin tended to suppress his sexuality in his early years.

== Filmography ==
- The Ball Resolver in Antac – animated short, Bernard Longpré 1964 – co-animator with William Pettigrew
- Syrinx – animated short, 1965 – director
- Cityscape – animated short, 1966 - animator, producer, director
- The Canadian Forces Hydrofoil Ship: Concept and Design – documentary short, Martin Defalco and Kenneth McCready 1967 – co-animator with Sidney Goldsmith
- Walking – animated short, 1968 – animator, producer, director
- Street Musique – animated short, 1972 - animator, producer, director
- Running Time – feature, Mort Ransen 1974 – co-animator with Co Hoedeman
- Agency – feature, George Kaczender, RSL Entertainment 1981 – co-animator with Ida Eva Zielinska
- Gulf Stream – documentary short, William Hansen and Bruce Mackay, 1982 – co-animator with Meilan Lam, Kenneth Horn and Sydney Goldsmith
- Spare Change – animated short, 2008 – writer, animator, designer, cinematographer, co-director with Laurie Gordon

== Awards ==
Syrinx (1965)

- 18th Canadian Film Awards, Montreal: Genie Award for Best Film, Arts and Experimental, 1966
- Golden Gate International Film Festival, San Francisco: Certificate of Motion Picture Excellence, 1966
- International Film Festival at Addis Ababa, Addis Ababa, Ethiopia: First Prize, Best Short film, 1966
- Philadelphia International Festival of Short Films, Philadelphia: Award for Exceptional Merit, 1968

Cityscape (1966)

- Golden Gate International Film Festival, San Francisco: Honorable Mention, Film-as-Art, 1967

Walking (1968)

- 21st Canadian Film Awards, Toronto: Genie Award for Best Animated Film 1969
- Chicago International Film Festival, Chicago: Gold Hugo for Best Animated Film, 1969
- American Film and Video Festival, New York: Blue Ribbon, 1969
- Adelaide International Film Festival, Adelaide: Silver Southern Cross Plaque, 1969
- Kraków Film Festival, Kraków: Award of the Science and Art Films Committee, 1969
- Golden Gate International Film Festival, San Francisco: Certificate of Merit, Short Films, 1969
- La Plata International Children's Film Festival, La Plata: Honourable Mention, 1969
- Melbourne International Film Festival, Melbourne: Silver Boomerang – Silver Boomerang, 1970
- Salerno Film Festival, Salerno: Diploma of Merit, 1970
- International Week of Cinema in Colour, Barcelona: Silver Medal, 1970
- Roshd International Film Festival, Tehran: Golden Delfan - General Release, Children and Young Adults, 1971
- San Francisco Short Film Festival, San Francisco: Certificate of Merit in Recognition of the Artistic Quality and Significance of the Work of Ryan Larkin for the film Walking, 1976
- 42nd Academy Awards, Los Angeles: Nominee: Academy Award for Best Animated Short Film, 1970

Street Musique (1972)

- International Week of Animation Cinema, Barcelona: Molinillo de Oro, First Prize, Special Techniques, 1972
- Melbourne International Film Festival, Melbourne: Grand Prix – Gold Boomerang, 1973
- International Short Film Festival Oberhausen, Oberhausen: First Prize of the International Animation Film Jury, 1973
- Columbus International Film & Animation Festival, Columbus, Ohio: Chris Bronze Plaque, 1973
- FIBA International Festival of Buenos Aires, Buenos Aires: Honorable Mention, 1974

== See also ==
- History of Canadian animation
