= Chris Landreth =

American animator working in Canada

- Born: Hartford, Connecticut, U.S.
- Occupations: director, animator, writer

Chris Landreth is an American animator working in Canada, best known for his work on the 2004 film Ryan. He has made many animated films since the mid-1990s, including The End, Bingo, The Listener, Caustic Sky: A Portrait of Regional Acid Deposition, and Data Driven: The Story Of Franz K.

== Life and career ==
After being an engineer for years, Landreth quit and began a second career as an animator. He received a BS (1984) in general engineering and an MS (1986) degree in theoretical and applied mechanics at the University of Illinois. Three years following, he experimented in fluid mechanics research, until he made baby steps into the world of computer animation. In 1994, he was hired to define, test, and sometimes even abuse computer graphics software products. Such products include "movie-grade" software, not limited to but including programs, such as Maya, from the Toronto-based animation firm, Alias (formerly Alias|wavefront, now owned by Autodesk).

This resulted in the productions of The End and Bingo. The End was nominated in 1996 for an Academy Award for Best Animated Short Film. Afterward, he met Ryan Larkin, a renowned animator in the 1960s and 1970s, who had recently fallen into a spiral of excessive drinking, cocaine abuse, and homelessness. This resulted in the 2004 production of Ryan, which won an Oscar in 2005.

Landreth's 2009 film The Spine won the Best of the Festival award at the Melbourne International Animation Festival. Produced by the National Film Board of Canada in association with Copperheart Entertainment, C.O.R.E. Digital Pictures and Seneca College, The Spine depicts a man who's physically and figuratively spineless and the breakdown of his marriage.

Subconscious Password was his third with the NFB, Seneca College and Copperheart Entertainment. It won the best short film prize at the Annecy animation Festival 2013.

In 2016, he created the animated vignette Be Cool for the NFB satirical public service announcement series, Naked Island.

Landreth is currently an artist in residence at the Dynamic Graphics Project of the University of Toronto. He is working on a feature-length adaptation of Hans Rodionoff, Enrique Breccia and Keith Giffen's graphic-novel biography of H.P. Lovecraft.

Landreth's films Ryan, The Spine and Subconscious Password were included in the Animation Show of Shows.

Landreth is a master with The Beijing DeTao Masters Academy (DTMA), a high-level, multi-disciplined, application-oriented higher education institution in Shanghai, China.

== "Psychorealism" ==
Landreth uses standard CGI animation in his work, with the added element of what he calls Psychorealism. This often puts a surrealist styling into his work, notably The End, Bingo, The Spine, and Ryan. For instance, in Ryan, people's psychological traumas are represented by twisted, surreal lacerations and deformities. As people depicted in the film get distraught, their faces distort. At one time in the interview, Ryan gets so upset he literally flies apart.

Psychorealism is a style first put into words by Landreth to refer to what Karan Singh described as "the glorious complexity of the human psyche depicted through the visual medium of art and animation."

== Awards and nominations ==
Year	Award	Category	Title of work	Result
1995	Academy Awards	Best Animated Short Film	The End	Nominated
2004	Academy Awards	Best Animated Short Film	Ryan	Won

== Sources ==
- Studio Daily
- Who's Who entry on Landreth
- Ohio State University
