= Chris Robinson (writer) =

Canadian writer and film festival director (born 1967)

- Born: 1967 (age 58–59); Ottawa, Canada
- Education: Carleton University

Chris Robinson is a Canadian writer and author. He is renowned for his contributions to the field of animation and is the Artistic Director of the Ottawa International Animation Festival (OIAF). In addition to fiction and sports writing, Robinson has authored numerous books on independent animation and has been recognized for hi work with several awards, including the Outstanding Contribution to Animation Studies Award from Animafest Zagreb in 2020 and Le Prix René-Jodoin in 2022 for his contributions to Canadian animation. Robinson also authored the screenplay for the Jutra Award and Genie Award-winning animated short film, Lipsett Diaries, directed by Theodore Ushev

== OIAF ==
Robinson began his association with the OIAF in 1991 while studying film at Carleton University. He has held various roles within the festival, including coordinating festival submissions and selection committees. In 1995, was named Executive Director of the OIAF. In 2000, he switched to Artistic Director to focus solely on the programming activities of the OIAF.

== Essays and columns ==
From 2000 to 2016, Robinson wrote the "Animation Pimp" column for Animation World Magazine. Partially influenced by Nick Tosches, Richard Meltzer, gonzo journalism, Robert Pollard, and Beat Generation writers, Pimp columns often fused philosophy, history, comedy, and memoir in discussing various facets of animation. A selection of columns were later compiled into a book illustrated by German artist and animator, Andreas Hykade. In 2016, Robinson renamed the column, Cheer and Loathing in Animation.

Robinson has also contributed to various publications such as Salon.com, Take One, Sight and Sound, Cinemascope, Montage, Stop Smiling, and the Ottawa Xpress. He is also the series editor of CRC Press’ Focus Animation series and a contributing programmer, moderator, and writer for the Animateka animation festival in Ljubljana.

Robinson's magic realist memoir, My Balls are Killing Me, about his experience with testicular cancer and divorce, is currently serialized in the Canadian magazine, Galaxy Brain.

Most recently, Robinson reunited with Theodore Ushev, writing the script for their live action feature film, Idling.

== Books ==
Robinson’s approach to writing about animation is both passionate and opinionated, often introducing readers to lesser-known animators and their works. His style is personal and engaging, making readers feel as though they are on a journey of discovery alongside him. He frequently discusses various facets of animation, including its artistic and technical aspects, and often includes personal anecdotes and reflections.

In addition to his columns, Robinson has authored several books on independent animation, such as "Unsung Heroes of Animation" "Japanese Animation: Time out of Mind", “Mad Eyed Misfits: Writings on Indie Animation,” "Earmarked for Collision - A Highly Biased Tour of Collage Animation" which showcases his eclectic and opinionated style. These books not only provide critical analysis but also introduce readers to a wide range of animators and their works from around the world.

Overall, Chris Robinson’s writing style in animation is distinctive for its blend of personal insight, critical analysis, and a deep passion for the subject matter.

Robinson's non-animation book Stole This From a Hockey Card: A Philosophy of Hockey, Doug Harvey, Identity & Booze (2005), which was a critical success and was shortlisted for the Ottawa Book Award. In 2013, TV hockey personality Ron Maclean listed Stole This From a Hockey Card as one of his choices of books that could change the nation stating that:

Robinson draws parallels between his own troubled past and that of epic defenceman Doug Harvey... The result is a biography cum memoir that should find resonance with many Canadians... Robinson reaches a high level of sports biography... creating an exquisite patchwork of sports, personal narrative and manic alcoholism that is tragic in its normalcy.

— Janine Armin, The Globe and Mail

== Bibliography ==
- Estonian Animation: Between Genius and Utter Illiteracy (2003)
- Ottawa Senators (2004)
- Stole This From a Hockey Card: A Philosophy of Hockey, Doug Harvey, Identity & Booze (2005)
- Unsung Heroes of Animation (2006)
- Great Left Wingers of Hockey's Golden Era (2006)
- The Animation Pimp (2007). Illustrated by Andreas Hykade. AWN Press. ISBN 9781598634037.
- Canadian Animation: Looking for a Place to Happen (2008)
- Ballad of a Thin Man: In Search of Ryan Larkin (2008)
- Love Simple (2009)
- Animators Unearthed (2010)
- Japanese Animation: Time out of Mind (2010)
- Maurice Richard: The Most Amazing Hockey Player Ever (2011)
- Mad Eyed Misfits: Writings on Indie Animation (2022)
- The Corners are Glowing: Selected Writings from the Ottawa International Animation Festival (September 2022)
- Earmarked for Collision: A History of Collage Animation (2023)
- Cheer and Loathing: Scattered Ramblings on Indie Animation (2023)
- Dreaming a Way (of) Life: The Films of Lewis Klahr (2025)
- My Balls are Killing Me (2025)
- Raw Outrage: The Films of Phil Mulloy (2025)
- Watch Me Jumpstart: Strutting and Stumbling Through a Life in Animation (2026)
- Times Out of Mind - Japanese Independent Animation (Routledge, 2026)

== Scripts ==
- Lipsett Diaries (short animation directed by Theodore Ushev, 2010)
- Idling (live action feature film directed by Theodore Ushev, 2026)

== Awards ==
- 2004: Special Award for Continuing Support of Independent Animated Film (ASIFA-East)
- 2005: Ottawa Books Awards Finalist for "Stole This From A Hockey Card"
- 2011: Genie Award for Best Animated Short for Lipsett Diaries (directed by Theodore Ushev)
- 2011: Jutra Award for Best Animated Short Film for Lipsett Diaries (directed by Theodore Ushev)
- 2020: Outstanding Contribution to Animation Studies (Animafest Zagreb)
- 2022: Le Prix René-Jodoin (for contributions to Canadian animation)
