= Walking (1968 film) =

- Screenshot from Walking
- Directed by: Ryan Larkin
- Written by: Ryan Larkin
- Produced by: Ryan Larkin
- Music by: David Fraser; Pat Patterson; Christopher Nutter
- Distributed by: National Film Board of Canada
- Release date: 1968
- Running time: 5 minutes
- Country: Canada
- Budget: $21,676

Walking is a 1968 Canadian animated short film directed and produced by Ryan Larkin for the National Film Board of Canada, composed of animated vignettes of how different people walk.

Following Larkin's work on In the Labyrinth for Expo 67, Larkin submitted a proposal to the NFB for a short film based on sketches of people walking. It took him two years to make the film—twice as long as expected—as he was perfecting new ink wash painting techniques in order to not repeat his earlier films. He was also absorbed in exploring human movements and behavior, even setting up mirrors in his small studio to study his own motions.

It was nominated for an Academy Award for Best Animated Short Film at the 42nd Academy Awards. Excerpts from the film also appear in the Oscar-winning short about Larkin, Ryan.

Walking was one of seven NFB animated shorts acquired by the American Broadcasting Company, marking the first time NFB films had been sold to a major American television network. It aired on ABC in the fall of 1971 as part of the children's television show Curiosity Shop, executive produced by Chuck Jones.

== Awards ==
- 21st Canadian Film Awards, Toronto: Genie Award for Best Animated Film 1969
- Chicago International Film Festival, Chicago: Gold Hugo for Best Animated Film, 1969
- American Film and Video Festival, New York: Blue Ribbon, 1969
- Adelaide International Film Festival, Adelaide: Silver Southern Cross Plaque, 1969
- Kraków Film Festival, Kraków: Award of the Science and Art Films Committee, 1969
- Golden Gate International Film Festival, San Francisco: Certificate of Merit, Short Films, 1969
- La Plata International Children's Film Festival, La Plata: Honourable Mention, 1969
- Melbourne International Film Festival, Melbourne: Silver Boomerang – Silver Boomerang, 1970
- Salerno Film Festival, Salerno: Diploma of Merit, 1970
- International Week of Cinema in Colour, Barcelona: Silver Medal, 1970
- Roshd International Film Festival, Tehran: Golden Delfan - General Release, Children and Young Adults, 1971
- San Francisco Short Film Festival, San Francisco: Certificate of Merit in Recognition of the Artistic Quality and Significance of the Work of Ryan Larkin for the film Walking, 1976
- San Francisco Short Film Festival, San Francisco: Certificate of Merit in Recognition of the Artistic Quality and Significance of the Work of Raymond Dumas for the film Walking, 1976
- San Francisco Short Film Festival, San Francisco: Certificate of Merit in Recognition of the Artistic Quality and Significance of the Work of William Wiggins for the film Walking, 1976
- 42nd Academy Awards, Los Angeles: Nominee: Academy Award for Best Animated Short Film, 1970

== Works cited ==
- Evans, Gary (1991). In the National Interest: A Chronicle of the National Film Board of Canada from 1949 to 1989. University of Toronto Press. ISBN 0802027849.
