= Lionel Bailliu =

French film director and screenwriter

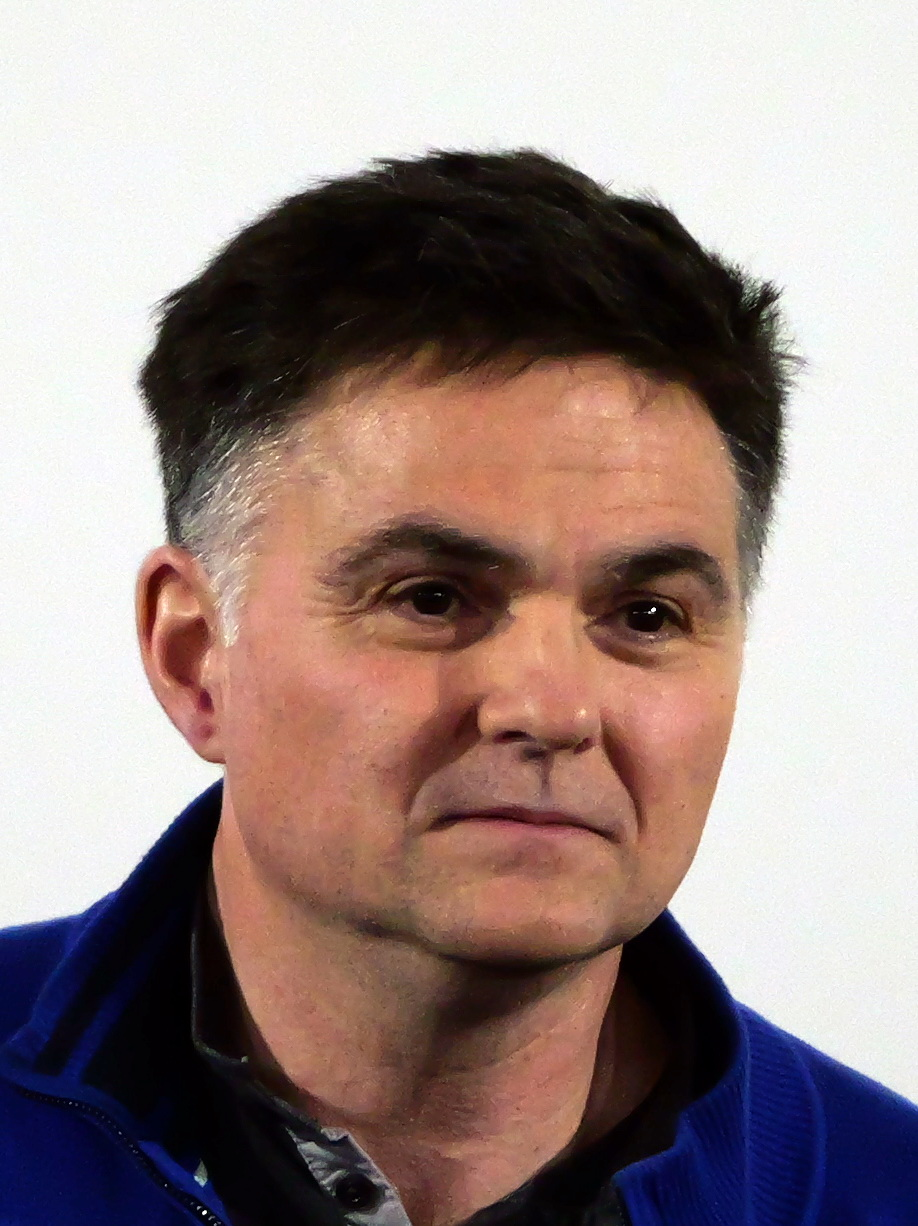
Lionel Bailliu

Lionel Bailliu is a filmmaker best known for writing and directing his Academy Award-nominated 2002 short film Squash. According to the Internet Movie Database, Bailliu also wrote four episodes of the French T.V. series Élodie Bradford, a show he created in 2004. He also wrote and directed the 2000 film Microsnake, the 2005 compilation Selected Shorts #2: European Award Winners, and the 2006 film Fair Play.
