= Old Brewery Mission =

Canadian homeless services organization

Coordinates: 45°30′24.69″N 73°33′28.55″W

- Mission Old Brewery
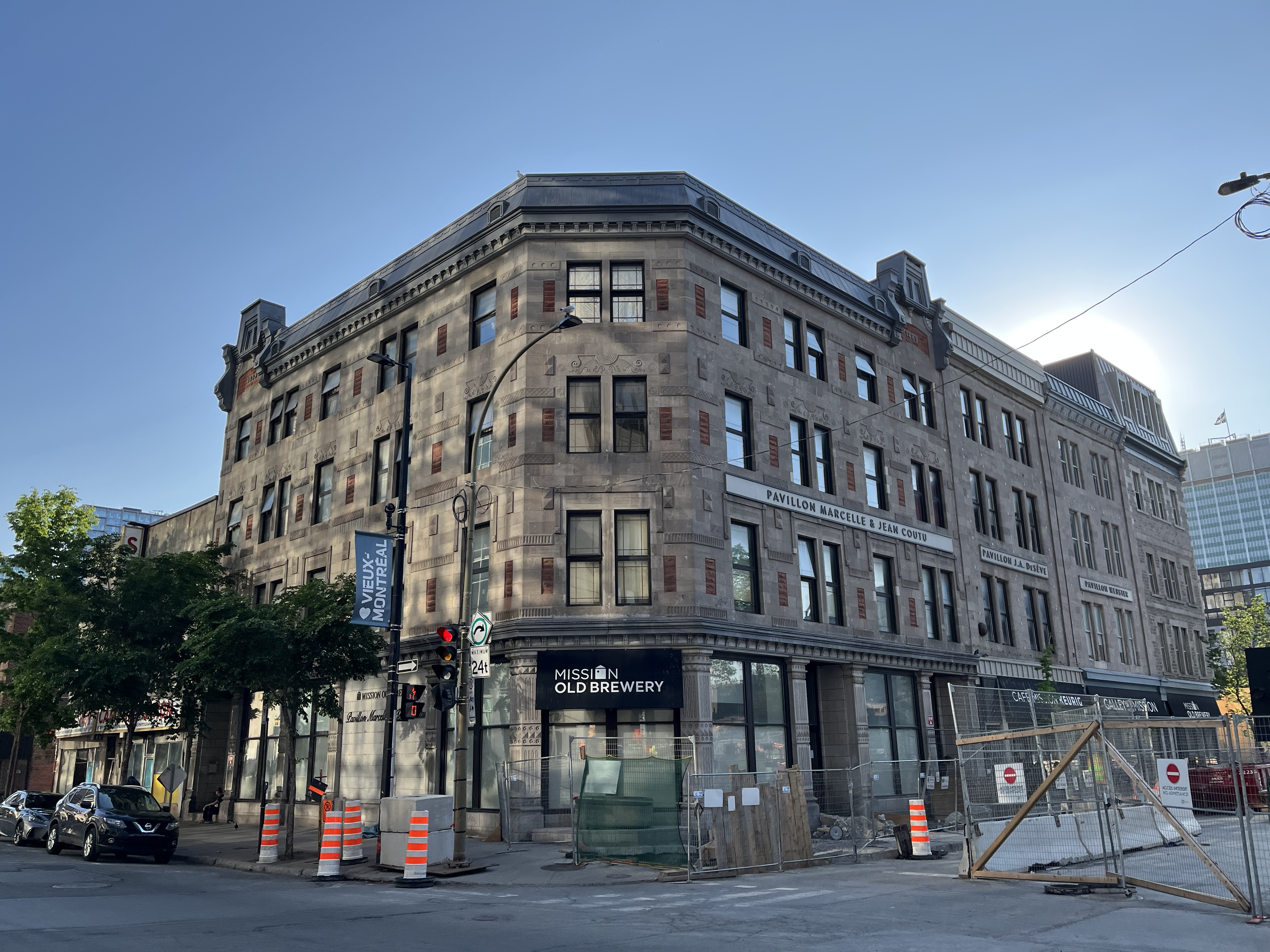
- Formation: 1889
- Founder: Mina Douglas and Eva Findlay
- Founded at: Montreal
- Type: Non-profit
- VAT ID no.: 89201 3608 RR0001
- Purpose: homeless services
- Headquarters: 902 Boulevard Saint-Laurent
- Official language: French, English
- Website: www.missionoldbrewery.ca/en/

The Old Brewery Mission is a resource for homeless men and women in Quebec, Canada.

== History ==
The Old Brewery was founded in 1889 by two women, Mina Douglas and Eva Findlay, who started serving hot meals to Montrealers in need.

In the early 20th century, the Old Brewery Mission gradually evolved from a soup kitchen to a full homeless shelter.

In 1998, its women's shelter, the Patricia Mackenzie Pavilion was opened.

Today, the Old Brewery Mission offers a wide variety of services to its homeless clientele, including food, shelter, reintegration programs, and mental health services.
