= Melbourne International Animation Festival =

- Location: Melbourne, Australia
- Founded: 2001; 25 years ago
- Website: miaf.net

The Melbourne International Animation Festival (MIAF) is an independent, not-for-profit annual animation festival held in Melbourne, Australia, since 2001. Recognised as the largest animation-dedicated event in the country, MIAF showcases a diverse array of animated works from around the world, with a typical program screening over 200 films from more than 30 countries. The festival has historically included international competitions, retrospectives, student showcases, and guest appearances by prominent animators and industry professionals.

Originally supported by the Australian Centre for the Moving Image (ACMI), Screen Australia, and the City of Melbourne, MIAF moved its screenings to the Treasury Theatre in 2019 due to ACMI's temporary closure for renovations. In 2022, the festival was cancelled following the withdrawal of key public funding, including support from Screen Australia, significantly impacting its operations and long-term viability.

== History ==
The Melbourne International Animation Festival (MIAF) was established in 2001 as a platform to celebrate and promote the art of animation in Australia. Over the years, the festival has grown to become the country's largest animation event, featuring a diverse selection of films from both local and international filmmakers.

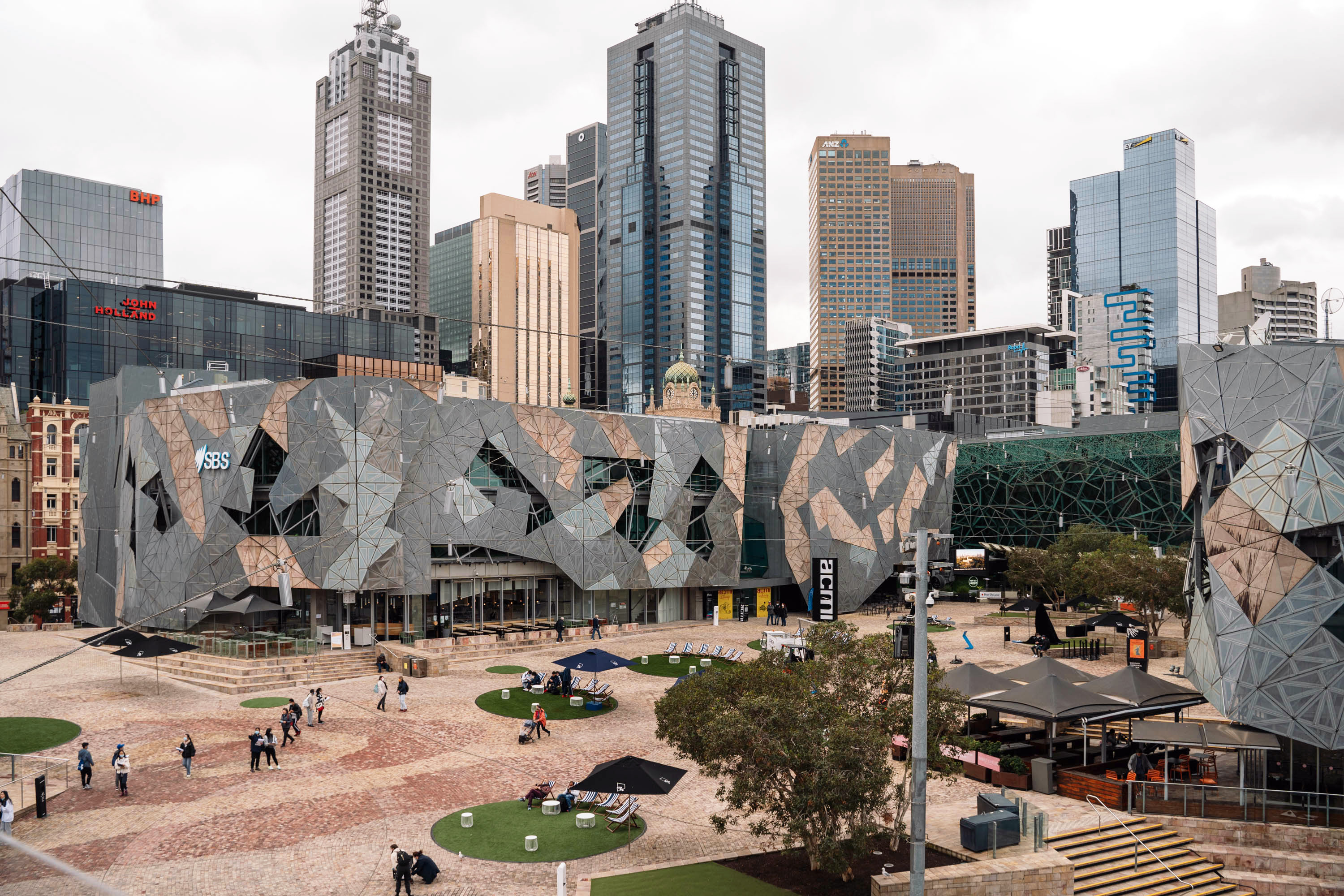
An aerial view of Australian Centre for the Moving Image, Melbourne

In its early years, MIAF was supported by the Australian Centre for the Moving Image (ACMI), the Australian Film Commission (now Screen Australia), and the City of Melbourne. The festival was initially held at ACMI, providing a central location for screenings and events. However, in 2019, due to ACMI's temporary closure for large-scale renovations, MIAF relocated its screenings to the Treasury Theatre. This move allowed the festival to continue its operations without interruption.

In 2022, the festival faced significant challenges when Screen Australia decided not to continue its funding support. This decision, coupled with the financial impact of the COVID-19 pandemic, led to the cancellation of MIAF 2022. The organisers expressed their regret, stating, "The ability to run the Melbourne International Animation Festival has always required significant funding... But together this has made it possible to run our festival." They further noted that "the decision in 2022 by Screen Australia to not continue funding us changed the DNA of our festival".

== Festival programming ==
MIAF has been renowned for its diverse and inclusive programming, showcasing a wide range of animated works from around the globe. The festival typically features over 200 films selected from thousands of submissions, encompassing various genres and styles. Programs include international competitions, student showcases, and curated sessions focusing on specific themes or techniques. Notable sessions have included "Digital Extremes," "Masters & Returnees," and "Hi-Fi Design," each highlighting different aspects of the animation industry.

The festival has also been a platform for retrospectives, celebrating the works of influential animators and studios. These retrospectives have provided audiences with an opportunity to explore the evolution of animation and its impact on culture and society.

== List of festivals by year ==
Year	Length	Dates	Location	Notes
2001	6 days	26 June 2001 to 1 July 2001	Treasury Theatre	Inaugural festival
2002	6 days	25 June 2002 to 30 June 2002	Treasury Theatre	
2003	6 days	24 June 2003 to 29 June 2003	Australian Centre for the Moving Image	First year at ACMI
2004	6 days	22 June 2004 to 27 June 2004	Australian Centre for the Moving Image	
2005	6 days	21 June 2005 to 26 June 2005	Australian Centre for the Moving Image	
2006	6 days	20 June 2006 to 25 June 2006	Australian Centre for the Moving Image	
2007	6 days	19 June 2007 to 24 June 2007	Australian Centre for the Moving Image	
2008	7 days	16 June 2008 to 22 June 2008	Australian Centre for the Moving Image	
2009	7 days	22 June 2009 to 28 June 2009	Australian Centre for the Moving Image	
2010	9 days	19 June 2010 to 27 June 2010	Australian Centre for the Moving Image	
2011	8 days	19 June 2011 to 26 June 2011	Australian Centre for the Moving Image	
2012	8 days	17 June 2012 to 24 June 2012	Australian Centre for the Moving Image	
2013	11 days	20 June 2013 to 30 June 2013	Australian Centre for the Moving Image	
2014	11 days	19 June 2014 to 29 June 2014	Australian Centre for the Moving Image	
2015	8 days	21 June 2015 to 28 June 2015	Australian Centre for the Moving Image	
2016	8 days	19 June 2016 to 26 June 2016	Australian Centre for the Moving Image	
2017	8 days	18 June 2017 25 June 2017	Australian Centre for the Moving Image	
2018	10 days	June 14, 2018 to June 23, 2018	Australian Centre for the Moving Image	
2019	10 days	July 12 to July 21, 2019	Treasury Theatre	
2020	4 days	May 13 to May 16, 2021	Australian Centre for the Moving Image	Re-Animated program with virtual engagements due to COVID-19
2021	4 days	May 19 to May 22, 2022	Australian Centre for the Moving Image	Re-Animated program with virtual engagements due to COVID-19
2022	Cancelled			Lack of funding
2023	8 days	May 7 to May 14, 2023	Treasury Theatre & The Backlot Studios	
2024	8 days	May 5 to May 14, 2024	Treasury Theatre & The Backlot Studios	
2025	8 days	May 18 to May 25, 2025	Treasury Theatre & The Backlot Studios	

== Results ==
Year	Best of the Fest	Best Australian Film	Best International Student Film	Best Australian Student Film
2016	Velodrool - Sander Joon (Estonia)	Hound by Georgia Kriss (Australia)	Switch Man - Hsun-Chun Chuang, Shao-Kuei Tung (Taiwan)	The Good, The Bad & The Noodley - Essington College (Australia)
2017	N/A	N/A	N/A	N/A
2018	After All – Michael Cusack (Australia)	After All – Michael Cusack (Australia) Lost Property Office – Daniel Agdag (Australia)	The Potion Controversy – Oscar Stockdale (UK)	Welcome To Shmeven 11 – Dru Shaw (Australia)
2019	Per Tutta La Vita – Roberto Catani (France)	Sohrab And Rustum – Lee Whitmore (Australia) Lost And Found – Andrew Goldsmith, Bradley Slabe and Lucy Hayes (Australia)	Strawberry Bums: Invasion Of The Snubgrubs – Jeremy Sullivan (USA)	Olga's Self Insert Fanfiction – Ella Sanderson, Georgette Stefoulis (Australia)
2020	Metamorphosis – Carla Pereira, Juan Fran Jacinto (Spain)	Meanwhile, At The Abandoned Factory... – Michael Cusack (Australia)	N/A	N/A
2021	Nocturne – Alexander Dupuis (USA)	Two Little People – Xin Li (Australia)	N/A	N/A
2022	Cancelled			
2023	11 – Vuk Jevremovic	The Pioneers – Simon Cottee	N/A	Hollow – Shirin Shakhesi
2024	Lack – Paweł Prewencki (Poland)	My Jumper, It Roars! – Isabella Spagnolo	N/A	Shoot Me In The Grocery Line – Yunlin Bai, Tori Huynh – RMIT
2025	Trash – Gregory Bouzid, Maxime Crancon, Robin Delaporte, Matteo Durand, Romain Fleischer, Alexis Le Ral, Margaux Lutz, Fanny Vecchie (France)	Plumpin – Ivan Dixon	NRUT – Sophia Schonborn (Germany)	Carrion – Gabriella Lee Sudyatmiko

== See also ==
- List of international animation festivals
