= Fangoria Chainsaw Award for Best Actress =

List of Fangoria Chainsaw Best Actress awards

The following is a list of Fangoria Chainsaw Award winners for Best Actress. The award was awarded annually to an actress for her work in a horror or thriller film. It was last awarded in 2020; the following year, leading and supporting performances were each placed into a single category, regardless of gender.

== Winners and nominees ==
=== 1990s ===
Year	Nominees	Film	Result	Ref
1992	Jodie Foster	The Silence of the Lambs	Won	
1993	Virginia Madsen	Candyman	Won	
1994	Melinda Clarke	Return of the Living Dead 3	Won	
1995	Heather Langenkamp	Wes Craven's New Nightmare	Won	
1996	Jada Pinkett	Demon Knight	Won	
1997	Neve Campbell	Scream	Won	
1997	Trini Alvarado	The Frighteners	Nominated	
1997	Fairuza Balk	The Craft	Nominated	
1997	Lynsey Baxter	The Cold Light of Day	Nominated	
1998	Sigourney Weaver	Alien: Resurrection	Won	
1999	Jamie Lee Curtis	Halloween H20: 20 Years Later	Won	

=== 2000s ===
Year	Nominees	Film	Result	Ref
2000	Heather Donahue	The Blair Witch Project	Won	
2001	Ellen Burstyn	Requiem for a Dream	Won	
2002	Nicole Kidman	The Others	Won	
2002	Emily Perkins	Ginger Snaps	Nominated	
2003	Naomi Watts	The Ring	Won	
2003	Aaliyah	Queen of the Damned	Nominated	
2003	Laura Linney	The Mothman Prophecies	Nominated	
2003	Patricia Clarkson	Wendigo	Nominated	
2003	Victoria Sanchez	Wolf Girl	Nominated	
2004	Angela Bettis	May	Won	
2004	Jessica Biel	The Texas Chainsaw Massacre	Nominated	
2004	Angelica Lee	The Eye	Nominated	
2004	Roselyn Sanchez	Nightstalker	Nominated	
2004	Radha Mitchell	Visitors	Nominated	
2005	Emily Perkins	Ginger Snaps 2: Unleashed	Won	
2005	Sarah Polley	Dawn of the Dead	Nominated	
2005	Jennifer Tilly	Seed of Chucky	Nominated	
2005	Bryce Dallas Howard	The Village	Nominated	
2005	Blanchard Ryan	Open Water	Nominated	
2006	Cécile De France	High Tension	Won	
2006	Angela Bettis	Toolbox Murders	Nominated	
2006	Jennifer Connelly	Dark Water	Nominated	
2006	Dakota Fanning	Hide and Seek	Nominated	
2006	Kari Wuhrer	Hellraiser: Deader	Nominated	
2007	No award			
2008	No award			
2009	Lina Leandersson	Let the Right One In	Won	
2009	Naomi Watts	Funny Games	Nominated	
2009	Eliza Dushku	The Alphabet Killer	Nominated	
2009	Jess Weixler	Teeth	Nominated	
2009	Alysson Paradis	Inside	Nominated	

=== 2010s ===
Year	Nominees	Film	Result	Ref
2010	Morjana Alaoui	Martyrs	Won	
2010	Virginia Madsen	The Haunting in Connecticut	Nominated	
2010	Jordan Ladd	Grace	Nominated	
2010	Manuela Velasco	REC	Nominated	
2010	Emmanuelle Béart	Vinyan	Nominated	
2011	Natalie Portman	Black Swan	Won	
2011	Chloë Grace Moretz	Let Me In	Nominated	
2011	Charlotte Gainsbourg	Antichrist	Nominated	
2011	Sarah Polley	Splice	Nominated	
2011	Melissa George	Triangle	Nominated	
2012	Rose Byrne	Insidious	Won	
2012	Pollyanna McIntosh	The Woman	Nominated	
2012	Amanda Fuller	Red White & Blue	Nominated	
2012	Tabrett Bethell	The Clinic	Nominated	
2012	Josie Ho	Dream Home	Nominated	
2013	Elizabeth Olsen	Silent House	Won	
2013	AnnaLynne McCord	Excision	Nominated	
2013	Jessica Biel	The Tall Man	Nominated	
2013	Gretchen Lodge	Lovely Molly	Nominated	
2013	Robin McLeavy	The Loved Ones	Nominated	
2014	Katharine Isabelle	American Mary	Won	
2014	Sharni Vinson	You're Next	Nominated	
2014	Mia Wasikowska	Stoker	Nominated	
2014	Saoirse Ronan	Byzantium	Nominated	
2014	Juno Temple	Magic Magic	Nominated	
2015	Essie Davis	The Babadook	Won	
2015	Scarlett Johansson	Under the Skin	Nominated	
2015	Tilda Swinton	Only Lovers Left Alive	Nominated	
2015	Alexandra Essoe	Starry Eyes	Nominated	
2015	Marta Milans	Devoured	Nominated	
2016	Maika Monroe	It Follows	Won	
2016	Barbara Crampton	We Are Still Here	Nominated	
2016	Abigail Breslin	Maggie	Nominated	
2016	Susanne Wuest	Goodnight Mommy	Nominated	
2016	Ryan Simpkins	Anguish	Nominated	
2017	Anya Taylor-Joy	The Witch	Won	
2017	Kate Siegel	Hush	Nominated	
2017	Kika Magalhaes	The Eyes of My Mother	Nominated	
2017	Natasha Lyonne	Antibirth	Nominated	
2017	Samantha Robinson	The Love Witch	Nominated	
2019	Toni Collette	Hereditary	Won	
2019	Nadia Alexander	The Dark	Nominated	
2019	Emily Blunt	A Quiet Place	Nominated	
2019	Jamie Lee Curtis	Halloween	Nominated	
2019	Violetta Schurawlow	Cold Hell	Nominated	

=== 2020s ===
Year	Nominees	Film	Result	Ref
2020	Lupita Nyong'o	Us	Won	
2020	Kiersey Clemons	Sweetheart	Nominated	
2020	Caitlin Gerard	The Wind	Nominated	
2020	Florence Pugh	Midsommar	Nominated	
2020	Samara Weaving	Ready or Not	Nominated	
