= Ginger Snaps Back: The Beginning =

2004 film

- DVD cover
- Directed by: Grant Harvey
- Written by: Stephen Massicotte; Christina Ray
- Based on: Characters by Karen Walton; John Fawcett
- Produced by: Steve Hoban; Paula Devonshire; Grant Harvey
- Starring: Katharine Isabelle; Emily Perkins
- Cinematography: Michael Marshall
- Edited by: Ken Filewych
- Music by: Alex Khaskin
- Distributed by: Lionsgate Films
- Release date: 10 July 2004 (FIFF)
- Running time: 94 minutes
- Country: Canada
- Languages: English; Cree

Ginger Snaps Back: The Beginning is a 2004 Canadian horror film and a prequel to Ginger Snaps and Ginger Snaps 2: Unleashed. The third and final installment in the Ginger Snaps series takes place in 19th century Canada, following the ancestors of the Fitzgerald sisters of the two previous films: Ginger (Katharine Isabelle) and Brigitte (Emily Perkins), who are identical in all respects to their modern-day counterparts.

== Plot ==
Each spring, a party from a fort travels to Hudson Bay to trade pelts for winter provisions, but in 1815, nobody returns.

Brigitte and Ginger Fitzgerald are lost with their horse in the wintry Canadian wilderness when they come across an abandoned camp. An elderly Cree seer woman appears and warns that they must kill a boy to prevent one sister from killing the other. As the sisters depart, unseen creatures track them and start howling, and their startled horse runs off. In the ensuing chaos, a Cree man (known as "The Hunter") saves and leads them to Fort Bailey, where they take refuge. Ginger explains to the fort's residents they are the daughters of a drowned trader and are seeking passage east.

The creatures are revealed as werewolves, which have besieged the fort for some time. Murphy, the fort's physician, inspects Brigitte's wound and applies a leech, secretly testing for werewolf infection. They are given a room that belonged to the son of the fort's leader, Wallace Rowlands. Awakened by a voice, Ginger investigates the corridors, where she eventually finds the source: a deformed boy kept in a small, bolted unlit room; he bites her shoulder as he flees.

When Ginger and Brigitte attempt to leave, James, Wallace's sergeant, confronts them. While Ginger and James are fighting, werewolves attack, killing one of the residents. Reverend Gilbert, suspicious of the sisters' intentions, leads them to an allegedly safe building, which actually contains a werewolf. The werewolf attacks the sisters, but the Hunter appears and kills it. As Ginger and Brigitte are going to their room, Ginger's nose starts to bleed, a sign that she is infected.

The sisters discover the boy who bit Ginger is Wallace's son, Geoffrey. As Ginger sleeps, he sneaks into the bedroom and wakes her. She tries to grab him, but he gets away. Geoffrey accidentally kills a man named Seamus who investigates the noise he makes, and Ginger is framed for his murder. Brigitte is held captive by James as Ginger is taken away to test for lycanthropy. Wallace arrives to find James threatening to rape Brigitte. He dismisses James and makes a deal with Brigitte: her sister's life in exchange for the sisters' silence regarding his son. Wallace and Brigitte find Ginger at the doctor's, strapped to the examination table and held at gunpoint, about to be tested with a leech. When Wallace demands they release Ginger, Murphy ignores the order. Wallace shoots him dead, which prompts the other men to leave.

Ginger finds Geoffrey mourning at his mother's grave and cannot bring herself to kill him. He tries to escape but is captured instead by the men, alerting them to the deception. Wallace arrives and kills his son himself. The sisters' protection at an end, Ginger is forced to leave, and Brigitte goes with her. Desperate for a cure, the sisters go to the Hunter's cave.

At the cave, the Hunter and the Cree seer explain that the sisters' coming has long been prophesied and that the Red and the Black will decide the destiny of the werewolf bloodline. Brigitte enters a trance-like state and has a vision of her destiny – the Hunter attempts to kill Ginger, but Brigitte kills her sister herself. As Brigitte emerges from the trance, she finds the seer is dead, killed by Ginger, who has fled. The Hunter offers to help Brigitte find Ginger but deceives her, leading her back to the fort.

Arriving at the fort, Brigitte is taken prisoner. Gilbert tells her to beg forgiveness to save her soul, but Brigitte rejects him. He drags her out onto the parade square and prepares to burn her alive but is interrupted by Wallace, who kills him. Ginger arrives, lures James into a fight, and slashes his throat, then opens the gates and ushers in the werewolves, who chase down and maul the last of the fort's residents. Wallace is soon bitten and sets the fort on fire before killing himself. The Hunter urges Brigitte to kill her sister; instead, she kills him and flees with Ginger.

The prophecy broken, Brigitte and Ginger decide to run away together and vow to protect each other. Brigitte holds out her hand and presses a cut on it against a cut on Ginger's hand, mixing their blood and infecting herself.

== Cast ==
- Katharine Isabelle as Ginger Fitzgerald
- Emily Perkins as Brigitte Fitzgerald
- Nathaniel Arcand as The Hunter
- JR Bourne as James
- Hugh Dillon as Reverend Gilbert
- Adrien Dorval as Seamus
- Brendan Fletcher as Finn
- David La Haye as Claude
- Tom McCamus as Wallace Rowlands
- Matthew Walker as Doc Murphy
- Fabian Bird as Milo
- Kirk Jarrett as Owen
- David MacInnis as Cormac
- Stevie Mitchell as Geoffrey

== Production ==
Ginger Snaps Back: The Beginning was shot back-to-back with Ginger Snaps 2: Unleashed.

== Release ==
The film premiered at the Fantasia International Film Festival on 10 July 2004. After the disappointment of the second film's theatrical run, Ginger Snaps Back: The Beginning was released direct-to-DVD. Lionsgate released it on 27 August in Canada and on 7 September in United States the same year.

== Reception ==
On the review aggregator website Rotten Tomatoes, 60% of 5 critics' reviews are positive.

Bloody Disgusting rated it 5/5 stars and said: "It surpasses its two predecessors by leaps and bounds". Joshua Siebalt of Dread Central rated it 2.5/5 and wrote that the film does not live up to the previous installments of the series. Brett Cullum of DVD Verdict wrote: "It's not quite up to snuff with what came before, but it still takes Canadian horror above and beyond anything Hollywood has been cranking out lately".

=== Accolades ===
Year	Award	Category	Nominee(s)	Result	References
2005	DGC Craft Award	Outstanding Achievement in Sound Editing – Feature Film	Barry Gilmore, Ronayne Higginson, Garrett Kerr, David McCallum, Brandon Walker	Nominated	
