= Ginger Fitzgerald =

- Ginger Snaps character
- Katharine Isabelle portraying Ginger in Ginger Snaps
- Created by: Karen Walton; John Fawcett
- Portrayed by: Katharine Isabelle (human form); Nick Nolan (werewolf form, 1st movie)

In-universe information
- Full name: Ginger Fitzgerald
- Species: Human (formerly); Werewolf
- Occupation: High school student
- Family: Brigitte Fitzgerald (sister); Pamela Fitzgerald (mother); Henry Fitzgerald (father)

Ginger Fitzgerald is a fictional character and the anti-villain of the Ginger Snaps trilogy. She is the sister of Brigitte Fitzgerald. Ginger was portrayed by Katharine Isabelle, while her werewolf form is performed by Nick Nolan.

== Appearances ==
=== Ginger Snaps ===
In Ginger Snaps, Ginger and Brigitte Fitzgerald are teenage sisters living in the town of Bailey Downs who are both fascinated with death and, as children, formed a pact to die together. One night, while preparing to steal the dog of Trina Sinclair, Ginger starts her first period which causes the girls to be attacked by a werewolf. Ginger is wounded, but is rescued by Brigitte. The creature is run over by a van belonging to Sam who is a local drug dealer. Ginger decides not to go the hospital as her wounds heal quickly. She slowly begins to change causing Brigitte to become worried and desperate to find a cure. Ginger starts to develop claws on her hands, hair growth on parts of her body, and a small tail above her rear end. After several failed attempts to cure Ginger, Brigitte discovers that a dose of monkshood helps control the infection. Before Brigitte can inject Ginger with the plant, she completely transforms during the ride home. After Ginger breaks out and kills Sam, Brigitte defends herself while holding the syringe in one hand and a knife in the other. Ginger lunges at Brigitte and into the knife, fatally wounding herself.

=== Ginger Snaps 2: Unleashed ===
In Ginger Snaps 2: Unleashed, while only appearing as a minor character, Ginger is seen in several of Brigitte's hallucinations telling her to give in to the transformation.

=== Ginger Snaps Back: The Beginning ===
In Ginger Snaps Back: The Beginning, Ginger returns as a lead character. In the 1800s, Ginger and Brigitte are lost with their horse in the Canadian wilderness when they discover an "abandoned camp". An Indian woman gives them each a pendant. Brigitte's foot is caught in a trap. Ginger seeks help, but a hunter frees Brigitte before she returns. They are led to Fort Bailey. A group of werewolves attack the camp and Ginger is bitten on the shoulder. After being held prisoner and fighting back, Ginger is now seen with claws and white streaks in her hair as she opens the gates and lets the werewolves enter. Ginger and Brigitte are the only ones left alive. When Brigitte states that she is cold when both of them are huddling in the snow outside the burning fort, Ginger states, "I'm not." Brigitte cuts her hand and presses it against a cut on Ginger's hand, mixing their blood and infecting herself with the curse as well.

== Characterization ==
The character is a goth teen who harbors an obsession with death and loathes the transition to adulthood, even making a pact with her sister to move out of their suburb or to commit suicide by the age of 16. Author Steffen Hantke describes Fitzgerald as having a "dark wit" and a "righteous social fury".

== Casting ==
Casting took place in Los Angeles, New York, Toronto, Montreal, and Vancouver. Isabelle auditioned on the same day as Perkins at their agency in Vancouver, reading to one another off-camera. Screenwriter Karen Walton said they were exactly as she had pictured the characters when their taped auditions had arrived.

== Reception ==
Susan S., a contributor to What Culture, wrote: "Obsessed with death and morbidity, and afraid of adulthood, Ginger Fitzgerald, portrayed by Katharine Isabelle of American Mary fame, only gets worse when she's bitten by a lycanthrope and the transformation into a wolf begins. She gradually becomes aggressive and over-sexualised, loses her relationship with her sister, grows pointy teeth and sprouts hair in really weird places. She even grows a tail which she actually attempts to cut off. It takes a big set of cojones to try to cut off any body part. Ultimately though, the film is interesting because it examines the dichotomy between Ginger's humanity and her animalistic side".

Jessica Roakes of The Toast also mentions the metaphorical nature of the character: "Ginger's body has betrayed her by menstruating. This is a key [tenet] of the body-horror genre—the monstrous comes not just from the outside, but from within the human body, from infection or perversion or unwanted biological functions. In Ginger's case, it is her metamorphosis from girl to woman that renders her monstrous".

== Works cited ==
- Hantkehe, Steffen (2010). American Horror Film The Genre at the Turn of the Millennium. University Press of Mississippi. ISBN 978-1-604734-54-6.
- Steiger, Brad (2011). The Werewolf Book The Encyclopedia of Shape-Shifting Beings. Visible Ink Press. p. 122. ISBN 978-1-578593-78-1.
