= A Christmas Horror Story =

- Theatrical release poster
- Directed by: Grant Harvey; Steven Hoban; Brett Sullivan
- Written by: Jason Filiatrault; James Kee; Sarah Larsen; Doug Taylor; Pascal Trottier
- Produced by: Steve Hoban; Mark Smith
- Starring: William Shatner
- Cinematography: Gavin Smith
- Edited by: Brett Sullivan; D. Gillian Truster
- Music by: Alex Khaskin; Ilya Kaplan; Main opening and " End credits theme" sung by : Nicolas Kaplan
- Production company: Copperheart Entertainment
- Distributed by: Image Entertainment (DVD); RLJ Entertainment (all media)
- Release dates: July 20, 2015 (FIFF); October 23, 2015 (Canada)
- Running time: 99 minutes
- Country: Canada
- Language: English

A Christmas Horror Story is a 2015 Canadian anthology horror film directed by Grant Harvey, Steven Hoban, and Brett Sullivan. It premiered on July 20, 2015, at the Fantasia International Film Festival and had a limited theatrical release on October 2, 2015, along with a VOD release. The film is a series of interwoven stories tied together by a framework story featuring William Shatner as a radio DJ.

== Plot ==
Dangerous Dan is a radio DJ stuck pulling a long shift at the Bailey Downs radio station on Christmas Eve. During his broadcast, he begins receiving notices of a disturbance at the local mall, where the station's weatherman, Stormin' Norman, is hosting a charity food drive. Telling his listeners to stay away, Dan keeps playing holiday music while a series of four stories unfolds.

=== First story ===
Dylan, Ben, and Molly Simon have decided to break into their school, which used to be a convent, to investigate the murders of two students that occurred in the school's basement the year before. Their friend Caprice, Dan's granddaughter, was supposed to go, but she instead has to go with her parents out of town. The three of them end up getting locked in the basement. Molly becomes possessed after witnessing a bloody ghost and tries to seduce Dylan. When he refuses her, Molly kills him. Molly successfully seduces Ben and after the act is finished, the ghost leaves Molly's body. Upon waking, Molly reveals that the ghost was actually a pregnant teenager named Grace who died when the school was a convent after the nuns gave her a gruesome abortion. The ghost is only interested in having someone give birth to her child and if they refuse, they are murdered – explaining last year's deaths. Despite having successfully gotten Molly pregnant, the ghost sees Ben holding a weapon which is viewed as a threat, and the ghost kills him. The ghost then unlocks the door and allows Molly to leave.

=== Second story ===
Scott Peters is a police officer who worked the murder case of the two students the year before, but had to take a leave from the force due to the trauma of it. On Christmas Eve, much to his wife's reluctance, Scott convinces his family to go into woods owned by "Big Earl" to chop down a Christmas tree for their house. During the trek, Scott's son Will wanders off and gets lost. He and his wife Kim find Will inside of a tree and are overjoyed, but their joy is short lived after Will begins to act strangely, culminating in Big Earl contacting the family to warn them that Will is actually a changeling. Earl demands she return the changeling to the forest, but she refuses until it kills Scott. Kim finally brings the changeling to Big Earl. He scolds the creature for leaving, but says he's unable to help Kim find her son because it's "up to the trolls". This ultimately ends with Kim shooting Big Earl, who was containing the changelings in the grove. Finally free, the changeling returns to its home and frees Will.

=== Third story ===
Caprice and her younger brother Duncan are traveling with their parents Taylor and Diane to visit their elderly Aunt Edda. During their visit, Edda tells them about the mythological creature Krampus, a punisher of evildoers, which frightens Caprice – especially after Duncan purposely destroys a Krampus figurine in an attempt to irritate Edda's caretaker, Gerhardt. Their parents take the children home at Edda's insistence, but on the way they get into a car accident, forcing them to walk. Aware that they're now being hunted by Krampus because they acted badly, the family members take refuge in a church where they attempt to confess their sins in belief that Krampus will leave them if they do so. However, they are picked off one by one until only Caprice remains. Caprice manages to flee to Aunt Edda's house. She is successful in killing Krampus who transforms into Gerhardt. It's revealed that he transformed into Krampus due to his anger over the family's actions and that Edda was fully aware that this would happen. Furious, Caprice's anger causes her to transform into Krampus, and she attacks Edda.

=== Fourth story ===
While preparing for a busy Christmas, Santa Claus discovers that all of his elves and his wife Martha have turned into zombies after one of the infected elves dies following a fit of rage. He manages to kill them all, but is then forced to fight against Krampus. However, right when he's about to kill Krampus it's revealed that "Santa" is actually a mall Santa named Norman, the weather forecaster on Dangerous Dan's radio show, who had a psychotic break while working overtime that caused him to see regular mall goers as zombies . The police arrive and manage to gun him down just as he goes to kill "Krampus", revealed to be the mall's manager, Mr. Taylor.

This is the disturbance at the mall that Dangerous Dan has been mentioning through his broadcast.

== Cast ==
- William Shatner as DJ Dangerous Dan
- George Buza as Santa Claus / Norman
- Rob Archer as Krampus
- Zoé De Grand Maison as Molly Simon
- Alex Ozerov as Ben
- Shannon Kook as Dylan
- Amy Forsyth as Caprice Bauer
- Jeff Clark as Taylor
- Michelle Nolden as Diane Bauer
- Adrian Holmes as Scott
- Oluniké Adeliyi as Kim Peters
- Orion John as Will
- A.C. Peterson as Big Earl
- Percy Hynes White as Duncan
- Corinne Conley as Aunt Edda
- Julian Richings as Gerhardt
- Debra McCabe as Marta Claus
- Joe Silvaggio as Jingles, Changeling
- Damir Andre as Principal Herod
- Jessica Clement as Grace
- Ken Hall as Shiny Elf
- Korina Rothery as Sparkles Elf
- Jonathan H. Caines as Wire Elf
- Brad Bennett as Chomping Elf
- Paige Moyles as Sobbing Teen
- Glen Gaston as Middle-Aged Man
- Eric Woolfe as Foreman Elf

== Production ==
Directors for this film were Steven Hoban, who created the original idea, Grant Harvey (and Brett Sullivan, all of whom worked on the Ginger Snaps trilogy.

The sound track was created by Alex Khaskin, and consisted of spooky adaptations of traditional Christmas music. The film includes gory special effects.

== Reception ==
On the review aggregator website Rotten Tomatoes, 83% of 23 critics' reviews are positive, with an average rating of 7/10. The website's consensus reads: "If you're in the mood for a fun enough genre film that kills its holiday theme, look no further than the surprisingly astute A Christmas Horror Story." Metacritic, which uses a weighted average, assigned the film a score of 49 out of 100, based on 5 critics, indicating "mixed or average" reviews.

Jake Dee from Arrow in the Head rated the film a 5/10, calling its overlapping segments "uneven", and stating that only the final two segments managed to be memorable. Brett Gallman from Oh, the Horror! offered similar criticism, stating that the film would have been better if its segments had played separately.

Not all reviews of the film, however were negative. Brad Miska from Bloody Disgusting gave the film a positive review, writing, "While A Christmas Horror Story doesn’t have the qualities of a big theatrical release, like Trick ‘r Treat, it’s glossy enough to bring joy to those however they end up seeing it." Jay Seaver from eFilmCritic gave the film 4/5 stars, calling it "a solidly-entertaining piece of work".

== See also ==
- Krampus, a 2015 horror film that also features the Krampus folklore
- Silent Night, a 2012 horror film that is centered around Christmas
- Tales of Halloween, a 2015 horror anthology film that is also centered around a holiday
- Trick 'r Treat, a 2007 anthology horror film that is also centered around a holiday
