= Show Me (film) =

- Theatrical Poster
- Directed by: Cassandra Nicolaou
- Written by: Cassandra Nicolaou
- Produced by: Howard Fraiberg
- Starring: Michelle Nolden; Kett Turton; Katharine Isabelle
- Cinematography: Patrick McGowan
- Edited by: Saul Pincus
- Music by: Evelyne Datl
- Production company: Red Plush Films
- Distributed by: Wolfe Releasing
- Release date: September 26, 2004 (VIFF)
- Running time: 97 minutes
- Country: Canada
- Language: English
- Budget: $CAD 900,000

Show Me is a 2004 Canadian psychological thriller written and directed by Cassandra Nicolaou and starring Michelle Nolden, Kett Turton and Katharine Isabelle.

== Plot ==
The film begins with Sarah caught in traffic. After Sarah (Michelle Nolden) shouts at Jenna (Katharine Isabelle) and Jackson (Kett Turton) when they attempt to wash her windshield, she feels bad and offers them some cash. Jenna and Jackson then enter Sarah's car and persuade her to take them to another corner to beg. After the pair spot some other teenagers on the corner they wanted, Jenna pulls out a knife and tells Sarah to keep driving.

The two teenagers force Sarah to bring them to her newly purchased cabin in a remote part of the wilderness where they begin to tie her up and toy with her. Tensions begin to rise as more is revealed about Jackson and Jenna and Sarah sees her opportunity to seduce Jackson in an attempt to escape. When Jackson attempts to rape her, she knocks him unconscious with a rock. Sarah gets away and runs into the forest after slashing her tires so the pair cannot drive away.

Back at the cabin, Jenna and Jackson get drunk after drinking the wine Sarah brought in the back of her truck. Jackson makes a move on Jenna, and they have sex. However, Jenna seems uncomfortable and in the morning, she leaves Jackson and goes into the forest to self harm. Sarah is still lost and comes across tree carvings by Jenna that lead to a picture of Jenna's mother who supposedly died in a car accident. After finding Jenna asleep on the ground with fresh wounds, Sarah decides to take her back to the cabin.

The trio spend a night drinking wine and celebrating Jenna's 17th birthday. It is revealed to Jenna that Sarah is a lesbian, and her relationship with her partner Sam has become tense in the leadup to their tenth anniversary. Jenna and Sarah kiss. The next morning, Sarah discovers a picture of the two while looking through Jenna's things that reveals they are brother and sister.

A man who Jenna had previously met at a gas station shows up at the cabin, and is confronted by the teenagers. Sarah introduces them as her kids to avoid his suspicion. However, when he notices the broken window on Sarah's car, Jackson hits him in the back of the head, killing him. Jackson and Jenna panic and run into the woods, where they hatch a plan to murder Sarah before leaving, as she is the only witness to the killing. Sarah follows them and promises to lie for them so they can leave. Jackson pins her down and urges Jenna to cut her throat, but Jenna can't kill her. Jackson, feeling betrayed, runs to the lake beside the cabin, and swims far out as Jenna and Sarah watch and scream his name. Jackson drowns, leaving the pair distraught.

The film ends with Sarah dropping Jenna off on a road and giving her her expensive bracelet. Sarah drives away remarking that all she had wanted was to save them.

== Cast ==
- Michelle Nolden – Sarah
- Kett Turton – Jackson
- Katharine Isabelle – Jenna
- Gabriel Hogan – Carl
- Allegra Fulton – Sam
- J. Adam Brown – Gas station attendant

== Distribution ==
The film premiered at the 2004 Vancouver International Film Festival, before going into commercial release in 2005.

== Critical response ==
Leah McLaren of The Globe and Mail panned the film, writing that "Perhaps the most off-putting aspect of this picture is the way it portrays the street kids as heartless sociopaths (they stab and kidnap people for fun, and laugh when their captive wets herself), and subsequently tries to arm-twist us into some form of sympathy for their 'unfortunate situation'."(Turns out the poor kittens were adopted.) Conversely, Sarah's brand of bourgeois Stockholm syndrome only makes her seem like a brainless dupe. The emotionally weighted revelation that she's a lesbian is supposed to signify, um, what exactly? That she's somehow morally above the fray? That she's 'one of them'? The soft relativist politics are enough to make any thinking liberal retch. As the story limps toward its painfully obvious moral conclusion (they must lay down their differences and come to understand each other in a yucky campfire make-out scene), the implausibilities pile up in inverse proportion to the film's lagging dramatic tension."
