= Small Sacrifices =

1989 television film directed by David Greene

- Genre: Drama
- Based on: Small Sacrifices by Ann Rule
- Screenplay by: Joyce Eliason
- Directed by: David Greene
- Starring: Farrah Fawcett; Ryan O'Neal; John Shea; Gordon Clapp; Emily Perkins
- Music by: Peter Manning Robinson
- Countries of origin: United States; Canada
- Original language: English

Production
- Executive producers: Suzanne De Passe; Louis Rudolph; Charles W. Fries
- Producer: S. Bryan Hickox
- Production locations: Edmonton; Springfield, Oregon; Allarcom Studios, Edmonton, Alberta, Canada; Law Centre, Edmonton, Alberta, Canada
- Cinematography: Ron Orieux
- Editor: Parkie L. Singh (as Parkie Singh)
- Running time: 159 minutes
- Production companies: Louis Rudolph Films; Motown Productions; Allarcom Limited; Fries Entertainment

Original release
- Network: ABC
- Release: November 12 – November 14, 1989

Small Sacrifices is a 1989 American made-for-television crime drama film written by Joyce Eliason and based on the true crime book of the same name by Ann Rule. The film is about Diane Downs and the murder and attempted murder of her three children. It stars Farrah Fawcett, Ryan O'Neal, Gordon Clapp, John Shea, and Emily Perkins. The film premiered in two parts on ABC on November 12 and 14, 1989.

== Plot ==
On 19 May 1983, at approximately 10:48 p.m, Diane Downs drives to McKenzie-Willamette Hospital in Springfield, Oregon with a gunshot wound to her arm. She claims that an unknown assailant attempted to carjack her and shot her three children: Karen, 8, Shauna, 7, and Robby, 3.

Her eldest daughter Karen suffers a temporary loss of speech due to a stroke after the shooting but recovers sufficiently to serve as a witness in court against her mother; her youngest daughter Shauna was dead on arrival, and Diane's son is paralyzed due to the gunshot. She is eventually tried and convicted of murder and attempted murder. During the trial, the prosecution plays Duran Duran's "Hungry Like the Wolf" to demonstrate to the jury Diane's choice of song used to motivate her to kill.

Diane Downs is sentenced to life in prison, and her two surviving children are adopted by the prosecutor Frank Joziak and his wife, Lola.

== Differences from book ==
Downs' children, Christie, Cheryl, and Danny, were renamed Karen, Shauna, and Robbie for the film. Her ex-husband, Steve, was renamed Boyd Paul. The prosecutor and his wife, who later adopted Christie and Danny, were also renamed. In both the book and movie, Downs' lover, Robert Knickerbocker, was renamed Lew Lewiston.

== Cast ==
- Farrah Fawcett as Diane Downs
- Ryan O'Neal as Lew Lewiston
- Gordon Clapp as Detective Doug Welch
- John Shea as Frank Joziak
- Garry Chalk as Boyd Paul Downs
- Emily Perkins as Karen Downs
- Ken James as Daryl Chapman
- Sean McCann as Russell Wells
- Lynne Cormack as Lola Joziak
- Maxine Miller as Verla Mae Wells
- Vicki Wauchope as Shauna Downs
- Christopher Carvalho as Robby Downs
- Timothy Sell as The Stranger (Carjacker)

== Reception ==
The film met with wide acclaim. It scored three Emmy Award nominations, including Outstanding Comedy/Drama Special, and Outstanding Lead Actress in a Miniseries or Special (Farrah Fawcett).

It received a Peabody Award, which cited the high quality of both the show and Fawcett's performance:

"This terrifying true story, based on Ann Rule’s best-selling book, marked a high point in television drama for 1989. At the heart of the chilling tale of a mother’s mental illness and unthinking cruelty is the performance of Farrah Fawcett. With this portrayal, Farrah Fawcett has forever put to rest the image of her talents associated with Charlie's Angels. Ably assisted by Ryan O'Neal, with exceptional writing by Joyce Eliason and direction by David Greene, Ms. Fawcett brings a sense of realism rarely seen in television miniseries. For a drama of unusual power, a Peabody Award to Small Sacrifices."

== See also ==
List of television films produced for American Broadcasting Company
