= Almost Grown (TV series) =

American drama television series (1988–89)

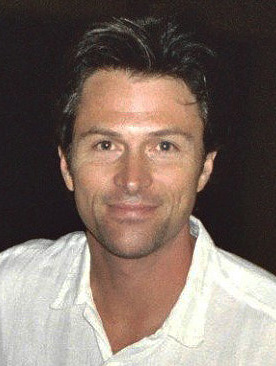
- Tim Daly was one of the leads in the short-lived TV series, Almost Grown
- Genre: Drama
- Created by: David Chase; Lawrence Konner
- Starring: Tim Daly; Eve Gordon; Marcia Cross; Rita Taggart; Anita Gillette; Michael Alldredge
- Composer: Craig Safan
- Country of origin: United States
- Original language: English
- No. of seasons: 1
- No. of episodes: 13 (4 unaired)

Production
- Executive producer: David Chase
- Running time: 60 minutes
- Production company: Universal Television

Original release
- Network: CBS
- Release: November 27, 1988 – February 20, 1989

Almost Grown is an American drama television series about a couple, played by Tim Daly and Eve Gordon, whose lives are explored during three time periods of their lives. The series was well received by critics, but aired for only 9 out of 13 episodes from November 27, 1988, until February 20, 1989, on CBS due to low ratings – running in the same timeslot as Monday Night Football and The NBC Monday Movie.

The series was co-created by David Chase, who would later create The Sopranos. Despite this and the later fame of Daly and Marcia Cross, the series has never been distributed outside of its original network run.

== Cast and characters ==
- Tim Daly as Norman Foley
- Eve Gordon as Suzie Long Foley
- Marcia Cross as Lesley Foley
- Rita Taggart as Joan Foley
- Michael Alldredge as Frank Foley
- Anita Gillette as Vi Long
- Richard Schaal as Dick Long
- Albert Macklin as Joey Long
- Ocean Hellman as Anya Foley
- Nathaniel Moreau as Jackson Foley
- Raffi Diblasio as Jackson Foley

== Episodes ==
No.	Title	Directed by	Written by	Original release date	U.S. viewers (millions)	Rating/share (households)
1	"Pilot"	David Chase	David Chase & Lawrence Konner	November 27, 1988	17.1	12.8/20
2	"Pilot"	David Chase	David Chase & Lawrence Konner	November 27, 1988	17.1	12.8/20
3	"If That Diamond Ring Don't Shine"	Michael Rhodes	Story by : David Chase & William Sackheim; Teleplay by : Robin Green	November 28, 1988	18.3	12.9/21
4	"Ghost Town"	Unknown	Unknown	December 5, 1988	11.0	8.7/14
5	"Santa Claus Got Stuck in My Chimney"	George Mendeluk	Frank South	December 12, 1988	13.1	10.0/16
6	"Take It Slow"	Tom Moore	David Chase	January 2, 1989	21.4	15.8/27
7	"The Wimp Factor"	Stephen Cragg	Andrew Schneider	January 9, 1989	15.3	11.6/19
8	"Visitors"	Joan Tewkesbury	Andrew Schneider	January 23, 1989	13.2	9.7/16
9	"Jersey Blues"	Unknown	Unknown	February 13, 1989	10.3	8.2/14
10	"Joey's 15 Minutes"	Kevin Hooks	Robin Green	February 20, 1989	10.6	7.9/13
11	"The Root of All Evil"	N/A	Jeff Baron	Unaired	N/A	N/A
12	"Richie"	N/A	N/A	Unaired	N/A	N/A
13	"Holy Grail"	N/A	N/A	Unaired	N/A	N/A
14	"The Hat That Fell from Space"	N/A	N/A	Unaired	N/A	N/A

== Awards ==
The list of awards and nominations for Almost Grown

Year	Award	Category	Recipient	Result
1989	Emmy Award	Primetime Emmy Award for Outstanding Achievement in Hairstyling for a Series	Susan Schuler-Page & Sharleen Rassi	Nominated
1989	CSC Award	Best Cinematography in TV Drama	Rene Ohashi	Nominated
1989	Young Artist Awards	Best New Television Series		Nominated
1989	Young Artist Awards	Best Young Actor in a Nighttime Drama Series	Raffi Di Blasio	Nominated
1989	Young Artist Awards	Best Young Actress Featured, Co-starring, Supporting, Recurring Role in a Comedy or Drama Series or Special	Ocean Hellman	Nominated
(Source: IMDb.com)
