= Katharine Isabelle =

Canadian actress (born 1981)

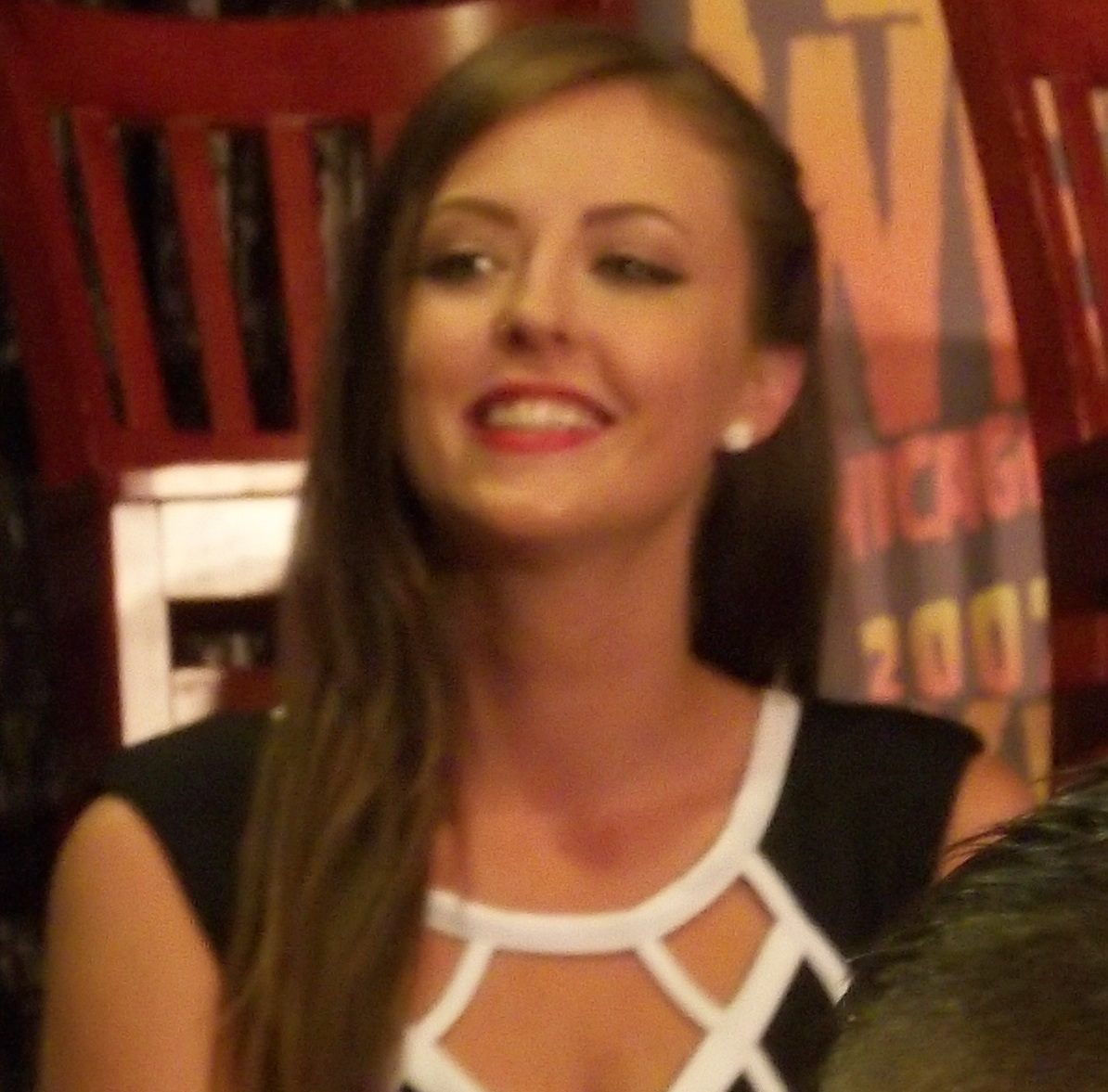
- Isabelle in 2014
- Born: Katharine Isobel Murray; 2 November 1981 (age 45); Vancouver, British Columbia, Canada
- Occupation: Actress
- Years active: 1989–present
- Parent: Graeme Murray (father)

Katharine Isobel Murray (born 2 November 1981), known professionally as Katharine Isabelle, is a Canadian actress. She has been described as a scream queen due to her roles in various horror films. She started her acting career in 1989, playing a small role in the television series MacGyver. She gained fame for the role of Ginger Fitzgerald in the films Ginger Snaps, Ginger Snaps 2: Unleashed, and Ginger Snaps Back: The Beginning.

In 2014, Isabelle was awarded the Fangoria Chainsaw Award for Best Actress for her role as Mary Mason in the Canadian body horror film American Mary.

== Early life ==
Katharine Isabelle Murray was born on 2 November 1981, in Vancouver, British Columbia. Her parents are Graeme Murray, an art director and production designer who has won two Emmy Awards for work on The X-Files, and Gail Johnson Murray, a writer and producer. Her paternal grandparents and maternal grandfather are from Scotland. Her paternal half-brother is Joshua Murray, a director and former actor.

== Career ==
Isabelle has been credited under several stage names during the course of her career.

She began her acting career at the age of eight as Katie Murray, playing an episodic role in the television series MacGyver in 1989. Then she continued to act in small episodic roles in television series and films such as: Cold Front, Immediate Family, The Last Winter, Burning Bridges, Children of the Dust, Salt Water Moose, and Married to a Stranger.

Isabelle has worked with her half-brother Joshua Murray in Cold Front and The Last Winter. In 1998, she worked with her father Graeme Murray on an episode of The X-Files titled "Schizogeny".

In 1998, she played Lindsay Clark in the film Disturbing Behavior, where Katie Holmes, James Marsden, and Nick Stahl were her film partners.

She first found fame in 2000 with the role of Ginger Fitzgerald in the film Ginger Snaps, directed by John Fawcett; actress Emily Perkins became her co-star in the film as sister, Brigitte Fitzgerald. Casting took place in Los Angeles, New York, Toronto, Montreal, and Vancouver. Isabelle auditioned on the same day as Perkins at their agency in Vancouver, reading to one another off-camera. Screenwriter Karen Walton said that they were exactly as she had pictured the characters when their taped auditions had arrived. The film centers around two sisters who find themselves dealing with the effects after one of them is bitten by a werewolf.

What Culture said:

Obsessed with death and morbidity, and afraid of adulthood, Ginger Fitzgerald, portrayed by Katharine Isabelle of American Mary fame, only gets worse when she's bitten by a lycanthrope and the transformation into a wolf begins. She gradually becomes aggressive and over-sexualised, loses her relationship with her sister, grows pointy teeth and sprouts hair in really weird places. She even grows a tail that she actually attempts to cut off. It takes a big set of cojones to try to cut off any body part. Ultimately though, the film is interesting because it examines the dichotomy between Ginger's humanity and her animalistic side.

Jessica Roakes of The Toast also mentions the metaphorical nature of the character saying "Ginger's body has betrayed her by menstruating. This is a key tenet of the body-horror genre — the monstrous comes not just from the outside, but from within the human body, from infection or perversion or unwanted biological functions. In Ginger's case, it is her metamorphosis from girl to woman that renders her monstrous."

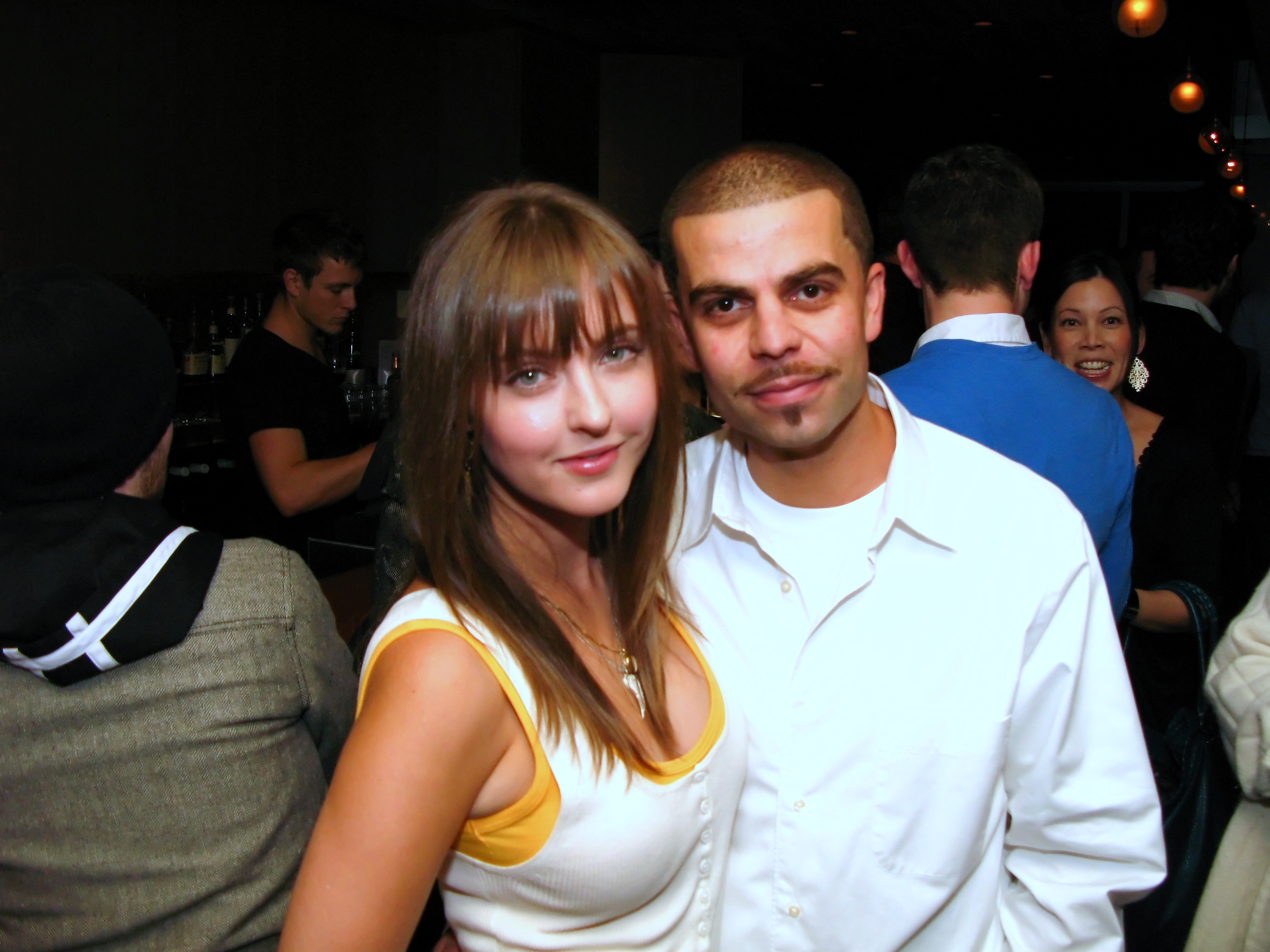
Isabelle with Syvash Yoriko at the premiere of the short film Favorite People List at the Vancouver 1181 Lounge in January 2009.

The actress also portrayed the character in the sequel Ginger Snaps 2: Unleashed and the prequel Ginger Snaps Back: The Beginning, both in 2004.

Two years later, Isabelle appeared in the film Insomnia. In this detective thriller directed by Christopher Nolan, the actress played along with Al Pacino, Robin Williams and Hilary Swank. In 2012, Isabelle starred in the horror film American Mary from twins Jen and Sylvia Soska. American Mary premiered at the London FrightFest Film Festival on 27 August 2012. It received a limited theatrical run in the U.S. on 31 May 2013, and became available on video on demand on 16 May 2013. This role brought her many awards at various horror film festivals, including the "Fangoria Chainsaw Awards".

In 2008, Isabelle received the Gemini Award for Best Performance by an Actress in a Featured Supporting Role in a Dramatic Program or Mini-Series for her role in The Englishman's Boy. She later reunited with Perkins in Another Cinderella Story where they played the daughters of Jane Lynch's character.

Cooperation with the gothic sisters continued in 2014 when Isabelle played a major role in their 2006 horror sequel, See No Evil 2. Later, she played a major role in the thriller Primate. In 2015, the film 88 starred Isabelle, after she played a cameo role in the film The Girl in the Photographs.

Also, she played the lead role in the short film Iteration 1 and one of the main roles in the action film Countdown in 2016. In 2019, Isabelle was cast as Vera Stone in the Netflix horror-drama series, The Order.

== Personal life ==
Despite acting in a large number of gory films and television productions, Isabelle is uneasy with the sight of real blood.

In 2003, Isabelle almost died from a viral infection, which caused one of her lungs to collapse, as well as kidney failure. She fell into a coma and had to be put on a ventilator. Isabelle made this revelation in 2020, on her Instagram account.

== Filmography ==
=== Film ===
Year	Title	Role	Notes
1989	Cousins	Chloe Hardy	as Katie Murray
1989	Cold Front	Katie McKenzie	as Katie Murray
1989	Immediate Family	Birthday Girl Carrie	as Katie Murray
1989	The Last Winter	Winnie Jamison	as Katie Murray
1992	Knight Moves	Erica Sanderson	as Katharine Isabelle
1996	Salt Water Moose	Josephine 'Jo' Parnell	as Katharine Isabelle
1998	Disturbing Behavior	Lindsay Clark	
2000	Snow Day	Marla	
2000	Ginger Snaps	Ginger Fitzgerald	
2001	A Shot in the Face	Erin	
2001	Josie and the Pussycats	Laughing Girl	
2001	Bones	Tia Peet	
2001	Turning Paige	Paige Fleming	
2002	Insomnia	Tanya Francke	
2002	Spooky House	Mona	
2003	Freddy vs. Jason	Gibb Smith	
2003	Falling Angels	Lou Field	
2003	On the Corner	Stacey Lee	
2004	Ginger Snaps 2: Unleashed	Ginger Fitzgerald	
2004	Ginger Snaps Back: The Beginning	Ginger Fitzgerald	Direct-to-video film
2004	Show Me	Jenna	
2006	Everything's Gone Green	Heather	
2008	Another Cinderella Story	Bree Blatt	Direct-to-video film
2009	Favorite People List	Denise Moynahan	Short film
2009	Rampage	Beauty Staff #2	
2010	Frankie & Alice	Paige	
2010	Hard Ride to Hell	Kerry	Direct-to-video film
2010	30 Days of Night: Dark Days	Stacey	Direct-to-video film
2012	American Mary	Mary Mason	
2012	The Movie Out Here	Danielle	
2013	13 Eerie	Megan	
2013	Torment	Sarah	
2013	Lawrence & Holloman	Zooey	
2014	See No Evil 2	Tamara	Direct-to-video film
2014	Primary	Andrea	
2015	88	Gwen / Flamingo	
2015	The Girl in the Photographs	Janet	
2015	How to Plan an Orgy in a Small Town	Alice Solomon	
2016	Countdown	Julia Baker	Direct-to-video film
2016	A.R.C.H.I.E.	Brooke	Direct-to-video film
2018	Bad Times at the El Royale	Auntie Ruth	
2019	Iteration 1	Anna	YouTube Short
2021	Night of the Animated Dead	Barbara (voice)	Direct-to-video film
2021	The Green Sea	Simone	
2023	It's a Wonderful Knife	Gale Prescott	
2025	Tron: Ares	Marcia Lee Hadlow	
2026	Prank Night	Joyce	
2026	Backrooms	Robin	
2026	Lockbox	Vahna Minter	

=== Television films ===
Year	Title	Role	Notes
1990	The Last Train Home	Sarah Bradshaw	
1990	Burning Bridges	Emily Morgan	
1991	Yes, Virginia, There Is a Santa Claus	Virginia O'Hanlon	
1996	The Prisoner of Zenda, Inc.	Fiona	
1997	Married to a Stranger	Lacey Potter	
1998	Voyage of Terror	Aly Tauber	
2002	Due East	Reba	
2002	The Secret Life of Zoey	Kayla	
2002	Carrie	Tina Blake	
2004	The Life	Amber Reilly	
2004	Earthsea	Yarrow	
2004	The Last Casino	Elyse	
2006	Eight Days To Live	Lucinda Klunn	
2006	Engaged to Kill	Maddy Lord	
2006	Rapid Fire	Amber	
2008	Ogre	Jessica	
2008	Mail Order Bride	Jen	
2009	Killer Hair	Cherise Smithsonian	
2009	Hostile Makeover	Cherise Smithsonian	
2009	Beyond Sherwood Forest	Alina	
2010	Sins of the Mother	Ivy	
2010	Smoke Screen	Wife	
2012	Goodnight for Justice: Queen of Hearts	Lucy Truffaut	
2017	Undercover Angel	Robin Bladen	
2021	The Long Island Serial Killer: A Mother's Hunt for Justice	Shannan Gilbert	
2022	The Gift of Peace	Joyce	
2023	Christmas on Cherry Lane	Olivia Sawyer	

=== Television ===
Year	Title	Role	Notes
1989	MacGyver	Violet	Episode: "The Madonna"; as Katie Murray
1990	Neon Rider	Maxine 'Max' Forrest	Episode: "Running Man"
1992	The Ray Bradbury Theater	Mink	Episode: "Zero Hour"
1995	Children of the Dust	Young Rachel	Television miniseries
1995	Lonesome Dove: The Series	Francis Maitland	Episode: "Rebellion"
1996	Goosebumps	Kat Merton	Episode: "It Came from Beneath the Sink"
1996	Titanic	Ophelia Jack	Television miniseries
1997	Madison	Allysia Long	4 episodes
1998	The X-Files	Lisa Baiocchi	Episode: "Schizogeny"; worked with father Graeme Murray
1998	Da Vinci's Inquest	Audrey	Episodes: "Little Sister: Part 2", "Little Sister: Part 3"
1998	First Wave	Elizabeth	Episode: "Book of Shadows"
1999	First Wave	Denise	Episode: "The Channel"
1999	Da Vinci's Inquest	Madeline Marquetti	Episodes: "A Cinderella Story: Parts 1 & 2"
1999	The Net	Malika	Episode: "In Dreams"
2000	The Fearing Mind	Josie Hogan	Episode: "Good Harvest"
2001	The Immortal	Taurez	Episode: "Wired"
2001	The Chris Isaak Show	Melissa	Episode: "Smackdown"
2001	Night Visions	Vicki	Episode: "Rest Stop"
2002	The Outer Limits	Tammy Sinclair	Episode: "Dark Child"
2002	Mentors	Anne Sullivan	Episode: "Breakthrough"
2002	John Doe	Shayne Pickford	Episode: "Blood Lines"
2003	Smallville	Sara Conroy	Episode: "Slumber"
2004	The Eleventh Hour	Petrel	Episode: "Stormy Peterel"
2005	Young Blades	Celeste La Rue	Episode: "To Heir is Human"
2006	Stargate SG-1	Valencia	Episode: "Camelot"
2006	Reunion	Courtney	Episode: "1998"
2007	Supernatural	Ava Wilson	Episodes: "Hunted", "All Hell Breaks Loose: Part 1"
2008	Psych	Sigrid	Episode: "Black and Tan: A Crime of Fashion"
2008	The Englishman's Boy	Norma Carlyle	Television miniseries
2008	Sanctuary	Sophie	Episode: "Nubbins"
2009	Heartland	Mindy Fanshaw	Episode: "Starstruck!"
2009	The L Word	Marci Salvatore	Episode: "Leaving Los Angeles"
2009	The Assistants	Paulette Reubin	Episode: "The Bully"
2009	The Good Wife	Cindy Lewis	Episode: "Pilot"
2011	Health Nutz	Jennifer	Episodes: "The Local Hero", "The Sponsor"
2011	Endgame	Danni	Main role, 13 episodes
2012	Flashpoint	Madelyn 'Maddie'	Episode "Run To Me"
2013–2014	Being Human	Susanna Waite	Recurring role; seasons 3–4
2013	Motive	Liane Healey	Episode: "Pushover"
2013	Eve of Destruction	Calla	Television miniseries
2013	Cedar Cove	Cecilia Rendall	Episode: "Pilot"
2014	Psych	Priscilla Morganstern	Episode: "Cloudy with a Chance of Improvement"
2014–2015	Hannibal	Margot Verger	Recurring role; seasons 2–3
2015	Rookie Blue	Detective Frankie Anderson	Episodes: "Integrity Test", "Ninety Degrees", "74 Epiphanies"
2017	Rosewood	Naomi	Episode: "Puffer Fish & Personal History"
2017–2018	The Arrangement	Hope	Recurring role; 8 episodes
2018–present	Little Dog	Ginny Ross	Main role
2019–2020	The Order	Vera Stone	Main role
2021	Ghosts	Liz	Episode: "The Vault"
2023	Transplant	Marissa	Episode: "Sinkhole"
2024	Tracker	Mallory Banks	Episode: "St. Louis"
2025	Sight Unseen	Gina Mathison	Episode: "Episode 2.1"

== Awards and nominations ==
Award nominations for Katharine Isabelle
Year	Title	Award	Category	Result	Ref(s)
2002	Ginger Snaps; Turning Paige	Vancouver Film Critics Circle	Best Actress in a Canadian Film	Nominated	
2004	Falling Angels	Leo Awards	Best Lead Performance by a Female - Feature Length Drama	Nominated	
2008	The Englishman's Boy	Gemini Awards	Best Performance by an Actress in a Featured Supporting Role in a Dramatic Program or Mini-Series	Won	
2011	Endgame	Gemini Awards	Best Performance by an Actress in a Featured Supporting Role in a Dramatic Series	Nominated	
2012	American Mary	Fantastic Fest	Special Mention in Horror Features	Won	
2012	American Mary	Screamfest Horror Film Festival	Best Actress	Won	
2012	American Mary	Toronto After Dark Film Festival	Best Leading Actress	Won	
2012	American Mary	Toronto After Dark Film Festival	Best Antihero (Mary Mason, played by Isabelle)	Won	
2013	American Mary	Fright Meter Awards	Best Actress in a Leading Role	Won	
2014	American Mary	Fangoria Chainsaw Awards	Best Actress	Won	
2014	See No Evil 2	Fright Meter Awards	Best Supporting Actress	Nominated	
2014	Lawrence & Holloman	Leo Awards	Best Supporting Performance by a Female – Motion Picture	Nominated	
2014	Motive	Leo Awards	Best Guest Performance by a Female – Dramatic Series	Won	
2015	Primary	Leo Awards	Best Lead Performance by a Female – Motion Picture	Nominated	
2016	How to Plan an Orgy in a Small Town	Canadian Film Festival	Best Ensemble Cast	Won	
2019	The Order	Leo Awards	Best Supporting Performance Female – Dramatic Series	Nominated	
