= Anything to Survive =

1990 film directed by Zale Dalen

- Promotional photo
- Written by: Elmo Wortman; Jonathan Rintels
- Directed by: Zale Dalen
- Starring: Robert Conrad; Emily Perkins; Matt LeBlanc
- Composer: Michael Conway Baker
- Countries of origin: United States; Canada
- Original language: English

Production
- Producers: Nick Gillott; Gary Hoffman
- Cinematography: Ron Orieux
- Editor: Rick Martin
- Running time: 91 minutes
- Production companies: ATL Productions; Saban/Scherick Productions

Original release
- Network: ABC (US); CTV (Canada)
- Release: February 5, 1990

Anything to Survive, also called Almost Too Late, is a 1990 Canadian-American coproduced disaster survival film directed by Zale Dalen and starring Robert Conrad, Matt LeBlanc and Emily Perkins. It is loosely based on the book Almost Too Late by Elmo Wortman, which is the true story of the Wortman family of Prince of Wales Island, Alaska.

== Plot ==
While sailing from Prince Rupert to their home in Ketchikan, Alaska, the Barton family (siblings Wendy, Krista and Billy and their father Eddie) lose their boat in a storm and get stranded on an island. The plot concerns the family going to extreme lengths to survive. Billy builds a raft and they attempt to sail to safety but they do not get far. Eddie and Billie head off to seek help while the two daughters try to keep warm under the remains of their boat's sail. Eddie and Billy find their way to a cabin on the mainland but cannot raise help. On day 23 they are able to return to the island and find that the girls are alive. Eddie and Wendy have frostbitten feet but all in the family survive and they are able to return to Ketchikan.

== Cast ==
- Robert Conrad as Eddie
- Emily Perkins as Krista
- Matt LeBlanc as Billy
- Ocean Hellman as Wendy
- Tom Heaton as Dave
- William B. Davis as Dr. Reynolds

== Reception and nominations ==
Anything to Survive is a made-for-television film, although the film did have some half-price screenings at limited cinemas in the United Kingdom, including one at London IMAX. The film was nominated for a Gemini Award in 1990 for Best Performance by a Supporting Actress (Ocean Hellman).
