= Elevated (film) =

- Directed by: Vincenzo Natali
- Written by: Vincenzo Natali; Karen Walton
- Produced by: Steve Hoban; Vanessa C. Laufer
- Starring: David Hewlett; Vicki Papavs; Bruce McFee
- Cinematography: Derek Rogers
- Edited by: Brett Sullivan
- Release date: 1996
- Running time: 20 minutes
- Country: Canada
- Language: English

Elevated is a 1996 Canadian horror-themed short film, directed by Vincenzo Natali and co-written by him and Karen Walton, who also participated in the writing of Ginger Snaps.

== Plot ==
Ellen takes the elevator from her workplace on floor 38, pressing the button for the parking garage. Burly workman Ben gets on several floors below. At floor 4, the elevator opens but nobody is there until a shout is heard as the door is about to close. Ellen holds the door to allow panic-stricken security guard Hank into the elevator, who takes the elevator back up. Ellen and Ben protest but see Hank's shirt is covered in blood.

Hank says something outside that looks like an alien is killing people and was about to get him. Ben doesn't believe it and tries unsuccessfully to send the elevator back down. Hank reveals he used his security card to override the controls. Ben tries to grab the card but Hank pulls a knife to defend himself. Ben restrains Hank while Ellen tries to call for help on the elevator telephone to no avail. The elevator rocks and the lights go out. Suffering claustrophobia, Ben opens the control panel using Hank's knife and tries to operate the elevator, but Hank stops him. He then tries to open the elevator ceiling hatch but Hank again stops him, saying the monsters will kill them all. The elevator becomes operational and Ellen wrestles the card from the men and sends the elevator down to the garage. Ben presses the button for floor 39.

When the door opens there is no sign of alien monsters. Ben steps out and invites Ellen to leave with him via the stairs. Ellen initially accepts but, seeing Hank's knife in Ben's pocket, dashes back into the elevator. As the elevator descends, Hank halts it with the stop button and something attempts to open the elevator hatch. Hank holds the hatch shut and instructs Ellen to send the elevator to floor 44. The thing outside dents the hatch before stopping its attempt to enter. Ben's mutilated corpse falls into the elevator.

Ellen blames Hank for not letting Ben back in and they struggle for possession of the security card which falls down the hole between the door and the floor. Ellen uses the knife to open the panel while Hank tries to convince her it is safer to stay in the elevator. She stabs Hank, initially accidentally, then proceeds to murder him by stabbing him repeatedly. The elevator descends to the parking garage.

When the doors open a shouting and screaming group of people squeeze into the elevator. Ellen grins malevolently.

== Cast ==
- David Hewlett as Hank
- Vicki Papavs as Ellen
- Bruce McFee as Ben

== Release ==
Elevated is distributed by the Canadian Film Centre and is not available on home video, although some DVD releases of Cube feature it as an extra.

== Reception ==
Beyond Hollywood compared it to The Twilight Zone and The Outer Limits, calling it "a surprisingly accomplished piece of suspenseful fiction".

It was a Genie Award nominee for Best Live Action Short Drama at the 18th Genie Awards.
