= Ginger Snaps (film) =

2000 film by John Fawcett

- Theatrical release poster
- Directed by: John Fawcett
- Screenplay by: Karen Walton
- Story by: Karen Walton; John Fawcett
- Produced by: Karen Lee Hall; Steve Hoban
- Starring: Emily Perkins; Katharine Isabelle; Kris Lemche; Mimi Rogers
- Cinematography: Thom Best
- Edited by: Brett Sullivan
- Music by: Mike Shields
- Production company: Oddbod Productions
- Distributed by: Motion International
- Release dates: August 1, 2000 (Munich Fantasy Filmfest); May 11, 2001
- Running time: 108 minutes
- Country: Canada
- Language: English
- Budget: $4.5 million
- Box office: $572,781

Ginger Snaps is a 2000 Canadian supernatural horror film directed by John Fawcett and written by Karen Walton, from a story they jointly developed. The film stars Emily Perkins and Katharine Isabelle as Brigitte and Ginger Fitzgerald, two morbid teenage sisters whose relationship is tested when Ginger (who has started her period for the first time) is attacked and bitten by an unknown animal, and then later, during the next full moon, slowly starts to transform into a werewolf. The supporting cast features Kris Lemche, Jesse Moss, Danielle Hampton, John Bourgeois, Peter Keleghan, and Mimi Rogers.

After premiering at the Munich Fantasy Filmfest in August 2000 and screening at the 2000 Toronto International Film Festival, Ginger Snaps received a limited theatrical release in May 2001. Despite modest box office receipts, the film was a critical success. It has since amassed a cult following and has been re-examined for its feminist themes. It was followed by a sequel, Ginger Snaps 2: Unleashed, and a prequel, Ginger Snaps Back: The Beginning, which were filmed back-to-back and both released in 2004.

== Plot ==
A rash of dog killings strikes the quiet suburb of Bailey Downs, Ontario. Teenage sisters Brigitte and Ginger Fitzgerald harbor a fascination with death and formed a pact as children to move out of the suburb or die together by the age of 16. One night, while on their way to kidnap a dog owned by school bully Trina Sinclair, Ginger begins her first period. The scent of blood attracts the creature responsible for the maulings, which bites Ginger. As the girls flee, the creature is run over by a van belonging to local drug dealer Sam Miller. Noticing that her wound has already healed, Ginger opts not to visit a hospital.

Following the attack, Ginger undergoes transformations that concern Brigitte - she begins behaving aggressively, sprouts a tail, and menstruates heavily, and hair grows from her scars. Ignoring Brigitte's warnings, Ginger has unprotected sex with classmate Jason McCardy. Later, she furiously beats Trina in public and kills a neighbor's dog. Brigitte seeks out Sam to obtain information on what his van struck, and they agree that Ginger was attacked by a werewolf and is transforming into one. After a silver navel piercing proves ineffective as a remedy, Sam suggests infusing an extract of monkshood, a perennial plant often referred to in lycanthrope folklore.

Trina appears at the Fitzgerald home and accuses Ginger of kidnapping her dog. In the ensuing struggle, Trina slips and fatally strikes her head upon the kitchen counter. The sisters hide her body in a freezer. Brigitte accidentally breaks off two of Trina's fingers while removing her body to bury it, which she later misplaces. On Halloween, Brigitte brings monkshood to Sam, and he creates an extract from it. Brigitte is attacked by an infected Jason, and defends herself by using the monkshood syringe against him. His behavior suddenly changes, proving that the cure works. At school, Brigitte discovers that Ginger has killed the counselor, and witnesses her killing the janitor. Ginger discloses her intent to target Sam next at the Greenhouse Bash, a Halloween party hosted by him.

The girls' mother discovers the fingers and Trina's corpse. She drives Brigitte to the Greenhouse Bash, telling her that she will erase the evidence of Trina's death by burning their house down. Brigitte arrives to find Sam fending off a nearly-turned Ginger. Brigitte wounds Ginger's and her own palm and clasps their hands together, infecting herself with Ginger's blood. She convinces Ginger of her loyalty and willingness to help her. As the sisters leave, Brigitte decides to abandon her mother. As Ginger feels her transformation approaching, Sam knocks her unconscious with a shovel. They take Ginger back home to prepare more of the cure for her.

On the way, Ginger fully transforms into a werewolf and escapes from the van. Sam and Brigitte hide in the pantry as Sam makes the cure. When he goes to find Ginger, she mutilates him. After finding Sam, injured and bloody, Brigitte tries to save him by drinking his blood to calm Ginger, but is unable to go through with it. Ginger senses Brigitte's insincerity and kills Sam. As Ginger chases Brigitte, Brigitte returns to the room where they grew up. Brigitte defends herself while holding the syringe in one hand and a knife in the other. Ginger lunges at Brigitte and into the knife, fatally wounding herself. Brigitte lays her head upon her dying sister's chest and weeps.

== Cast ==
- Emily Perkins as Brigitte Fitzgerald
- Katharine Isabelle as Ginger Fitzgerald
- Kris Lemche as Sam McDonald
- Mimi Rogers as Pamela Fitzgerald
- Jesse Moss as Jason McCardy
- Danielle Hampton as Trina Sinclair
- John Bourgeois as Henry Fitzgerald
- Peter Keleghan as Mr. Wayne, a teacher and guidance counselor at Bailey Downs High School
- Christopher Redman as Ben
- Jimmy MacInnis as Tim
- Lindsay Leese as Nurse Ferry, the school nurse
- Wendii Fulford as Ms. Sykes, the Bailey Downs High School gym and field hockey teacher
- Ann Baggley as mother
- Graeme Robertson and Maxwell Robertson as toddler
- Pak-Kong Ho as janitor
- Bryon Bully as hockey kid
- Steven Taylor as puppy kid
- Shelley Cook as puppy kid's mother

Nick Nolan portrayed both the initial werewolf (nicknamed "the Beast of Bailey Downs" by the town's residents) and the "Gingerwolf", the werewolf which Ginger becomes.

== Production ==
=== Development ===
John Fawcett, a fan of monster movies and David Cronenberg, was inspired to write a story about the relationship between two female protagonists during horrific events after watching Heavenly Creatures (1994). Fawcett stated that "I knew that I wanted to make a metamorphosis movie and a horror film. I also knew that I wanted to work with girls". In January 1995, he talked to screenwriter Karen Walton, who was initially reluctant to write the script due to the horror genre's reputation for weak characters, poor storytelling, and a negative portrayal of women. However, Fawcett convinced Walton the film would reinterpret the genre.

In 1996, Walton met with Vincenzo Natali, who was writing Cube, at the Canadian Film Centre and she later stated that Ginger Snaps and Cube were "cross-pollinating each other". Natali and Walton previously worked together on Elevated. Walton viewed most werewolf films as the same and said that while An American Werewolf in London was her favourite werewolf film, "it was still two white dudes grappling with the beast inside of them".

Fawcett and Walton encountered trouble financing the film. They approached producer Steve Hoban, with whom they had worked before, and he agreed to produce the film. Hoban employed Ken Chubb to edit and polish the story, and after two years they were ready to seek financiers.

The $4.5 million budget for the film came from public and private sourcing. Telefilm Canada contributed $1.25 million and the Canadian Television Fund contributed a similar amount. Motion International committed to co-financing and Canadian distribution, and Trimark Pictures agreed to be the co-financier, U.S. distributor, and international sales agent. Hoban formed Copperheart Entertainment in 1999, and Ginger Snaps was the first project it supported. Production seemed ready to go by fall of 1998; however, negotiations with Trimark caused the producers to miss the budgeting deadline for Telefilm. Rather than go ahead with only 60% of the funding, Hoban decided to wait a year for Telefilm's funding. During this interval, Trimark dropped the film. Lionsgate Films, who Trimark would end up merging with in 2000, took Trimark's place. Wendy Lill, the New Democratic Party's federal culture critic, was critical of Telefilm's financial support of the film due to its violence.

=== Casting ===
Six casting directors in Toronto, who chose to remain anonymous, announced they would boycott Ginger Snaps due to their worries about it depicting the murder of high school students after multiple school shootings in the United States and Canada. In 2021, Fawcett revealed that Scarlett Johansson was originally offered the role of Brigitte, but her mother did not want her involved after reading a National Post article about a boycott of the film by casting directors in Canada.

Auditions were held in Toronto, Vancouver, and Los Angeles. Emily Perkins and Katharine Isabelle, who read for the parts together, were selected to play the Fitzgerald sisters. The actresses were noted for their similar backgrounds as both were born in the same hospital, attended the same school, and appeared in episodes of The X-Files. Perkins, who cut her hair before confirmation of her casting, wore a wig during the film. Isabelle credits the casting director boycott for her casting as independent and low-budget Canadian films would normally hire locally.

Attention then turned to the next most important characters: the drug dealer and the mother roles. Mimi Rogers readily agreed to play the mother, Pamela, saying that she liked the black humour and comic relief in the role. Robin Cook, the Canadian casting director, put forward one of her favourites, Kris Lemche, for the role of drug dealer Sam. After seeing Kris's audition, Fawcett hired him.

Lucy Lawless, who Fawcett directed in several episodes of Xena: Warrior Princess, appears in the film in an uncredited cameo as a school announcer and is thanked in the credits alongside Rob Tapert.

=== Shooting ===
Katharine Isabelle having a facial prosthetic applied.

Principal photography took place between October 25 and December 6, 1999. Thom Best, the film's cinematagrapher, previously worked with Fawcett on Half Nelson and The Boys Club. Interior scenes were shot in a studio warehouse in Toronto. The Bailey Downs High scenes were filmed at a school in Scarborough. The exterior of the Fitzgeralds' house was shot at a home in Brampton, and a park in Meadowvale Village in Mississauga was also used. Shooting outside during Toronto's winter for sixteen hours a day, six days a week meant that sickness would make its rounds through the cast and crew every few weeks.

On the first day of shooting in the suburbs, all the still photographs for the title sequence were created. The bloody, staged deaths drew a crowd and Fawcett worried about upsetting the neighbours. The girls were covered in fake blood for the shots, and at the time, a homeowner's basement served as their changing room. Each time they needed to change, someone had to distract the homeowner's four-year-old child.

Long shooting days pushed the earliest possible start later each day until the scenes written for day were being shot after late into the night. Director of photography Thom Best solved the problem by using diffusion gel and four eighteen kilowatt lamps which generated enough light to be seen a mile high in the sky.

Fawcett stated that Ginger's wolf transformation was meant to be similar to Seth Brundle's transformation in The Fly.

The special effects proved to be a major hardship, as Fawcett eschewed CGI effects and preferred to use more traditional means of prosthetics and make-up. Consequently, Isabelle had to spend up to seven hours in the makeup chair to create Ginger's metamorphosis and a further two hours to remove them. Often covered in sticky fake blood that required Borax and household detergent to remove, she further endured wearing contacts that hindered her vision and teeth that meant she could not speak without a lisp. The most aggravating thing was the full facial prosthetic which gave her a permanently runny nose that she had to stop with cotton swabs.

Industrial metal and Gothic rock are used in the film's soundtrack and appear diegetically in Sam's van.

Fawcett requested Brett Sullivan to consistently trim down scenes and produce a tightly paced film.

=== Post-production ===
Beginning in December 1999, Brett Sullivan worked with Fawcett for eight weeks to create the final cut of the film. Despite the short time for editing, the film was nominated for a Genie in editing. Despite a similarly tight schedule in the sound department, the film would also be nominated for a Genie in sound editing.

== Soundtrack ==
The soundtrack was released on Roadrunner Records.

Track listing
No.	Title	Artist	Length
1.	"Inside You"	Godhead	3:31
2.	"Pipe Dream"	Project 86	4:35
3.	"Siberian Kiss"	Glassjaw	3:50
4.	"The Silent Acquiescence of Millions"	Sinch	8:44
5.	"Temple from the Within"	Killswitch Engage	3:45
6.	"First Commandment"	Soulfly featuring Chino Moreno	4:29
7.	"Cloning Technology"	Fear Factory	5:52
8.	"A Night Like This"	Professional Murder Music	3:28
9.	"Desire to Fire"	Machine Head	4:49
10.	"Burial for the Living"	Hatebreed	1:40
11.	"Pin Cushion"	Saliva	4:49
12.	"Of One Blood"	Shadows Fall	4:45
13.	"Action Radius"	Junkie XL	3:53
14.	"Her Ghost in the Fog"	Cradle of Filth	6:24

Uncredited track listing
No.	Title	Artist	Length
15.	"Ginger Snaps - Opening"	Michael Shields	2:10
16.	"Ginger Snaps Theme Song (no sound effects)"	Michael Shields	3:00

== Release ==
Ginger Snaps premiered at the Munich Fantasy Filmfest on 1 August 2000. It was shown at the Toronto International Film Festival the next month. Word-of-mouth marketing led to the film's showings on 10 and 11 September to have high ticket sales. However, the hype for the film declined and few theatres in Canada showed it for more than one week. It was theatrically released in Canada by Motion International through TVA Films in May 2001. It grossed CAD $425,753 domestically, making it the fifth highest-grossing Canadian film between December 2000 and November 2001.

In the United States, Ginger Snaps received a limited theatrical release by Unapix Entertainment and Village Features while Artisan Entertainment released it on home video; 20th Century Fox was later given a license for a DVD release. For its home video releases it was distributed by Optimum Releasing in the United Kingdom and Paradiso Entertainment in the Netherlands and Belgium. In France and Germany, the film was released on VHS and DVD under the titles of Between Sisters and The Beast Is Inside You respectively.

== Reception ==
The film has a 92% approval rating on review aggregator website Rotten Tomatoes, based on 61 reviews; the average rating is 7.3/10. The site's consensus reads: "The strong female cast and biting satire of teenage life makes Ginger Snaps far more memorable than your average werewolf movie – or teen flick". Metacritic, which uses a weighted average, assigned the film a score of 70 out of 100, based on 9 critics, indicating "generally favorable" reviews.

Critics' praise was centered on the quality of acting by the two leads, the horrific metamorphosis reminiscent of Cronenberg, the use of lycanthropy as a metaphor for puberty, and the dark humour. The humour of the film was praised by Scott Tobias, writing for The A.V. Club, and he noted that it was a hybrid of Buffy the Vampire Slayer and the works of Cronenberg.

Because the film links lycanthropy to menstruation and features two sisters, Ginger Snaps lends itself to a feminist critique. Feminist scholar Bianca Nielsen wrote: "By simultaneously depicting female bonds as important and fraught with difficulties, Ginger Snaps portrays the double-binds teenage girls face. Ginger is an embodiment of these impossible binaries: she is at once sexually attractive and monstrous, 'natural' and 'supernatural', human and animal, 'feminine' and transgressive, a sister and a rival".

Critics who panned the film thought the puberty metaphor was too obvious, the characters too over-the-top (especially the mother), and the dark humour and horror elements unbalanced.

Melora Koepke, a reporter for Maisonneuve, was one of the first people to declare Ginger Snaps a cult film. Frederick Blichert, writing for Vice, stated that Ginger Snaps was one of the greatest Canadian films of the 21st century. Perkins was inducted into Fangoria Hall of Fame in 2005, and Ginger Snaps was listed as one of the 101 Best Horror Movies You've Never Seen by Fangoria in 2009. It is ranked 78 on Time Out London's list of 100 best horror films, with Tom Huddleston referring to the film as "the best teenage werewolf movie, period".

=== Accolades ===
Award	Ceremony (Note: Each date is linked to the article about the awards held that year, wherever possible.)	Category	Recipient(s)	Result	Ref.
Toronto International Film Festival	September 17, 2000	Best Canadian Film - Special Jury Citation	Ginger Snaps	Won	
Málaga International Week of Fantastic Cinema	February 28, 2001	Best Feature Film	Ginger Snaps (John Fawcett, director)	Won	
Málaga International Week of Fantastic Cinema	February 28, 2001	Best Special Effects	Ginger Snaps	Won	
Málaga International Week of Fantastic Cinema	February 28, 2001	Best Actress	Emily Perkins	Won	
Toronto Film Critics Association Awards	December 20, 2001	Best Canadian Film	Ginger Snaps (John Fawcett, director)	Nominated	
Vancouver Film Critics Circle	January 31, 2002	Best Canadian Film	Ginger Snaps	Nominated	
Vancouver Film Critics Circle	January 31, 2002	Best Actress in a Canadian Film	Katharine Isabelle	Nominated	
Genie Awards	February 7, 2002	Achievement in Cinematography	Thom Best	Nominated	
Genie Awards	February 7, 2002	Achievement in Editing	Brett C. Sullivan	Nominated	
Genie Awards	February 7, 2002	Achievement in Sound Editing	David McCallum, Donna Powell, Fred Brennan, Garrett Kerr, Jane Tattersall, Mishann Lau, Rob Warchol	Nominated	
Canadian Comedy Awards	April 4, 2002	Best Writing - Film (Pretty Funny Writing)	Karen Walton	Won	
International Horror Guild Award	April 13, 2002	Best Film	Ginger Snaps	Won	
Saturn Award	June 10, 2002	Best DVD Release (inaugural)	Ginger Snaps	Won	
Fangoria Chainsaw Awards	2002	Best Limited-Release Film/Direct-to-Video Film	Ginger Snaps	Won	
Fangoria Chainsaw Awards	2002	Best Screenplay	Karen Walton	Won	
Fangoria Chainsaw Awards	2002	Best Actress	Emily Perkins	Nominated	
Fangoria Chainsaw Awards	2002	Best Supporting Actress	Mimi Rogers	Nominated	

== Analysis ==
Ginger Snaps was compared to The Company of Wolves after it was shown at Fantasy Filmfest. Aviva Briefel stated that Ginger Snaps was a "self-conscious rewrite" of Carrie and that both dealt with suffering and menstruation. Baxter, the first dog to die, shares the same name with the dog in the horror film Baxter.

== Franchise and influence ==
Based on successful DVD sales, both a sequel, Ginger Snaps 2: Unleashed, and a prequel, Ginger Snaps Back: The Beginning, were filmed back-to-back in 2003. Even though Ginger Snaps 2 had a wider release than the original, it underperformed at the box office. Consequently, Ginger Snaps Back: The Beginning went direct-to-video. In October 2020, a television series was announced to be in development.

The 2009 film Jennifer's Body draws frequent comparisons to Ginger Snaps. Their plots, and the relationship between the two main female characters, are strikingly similar in many ways. Despite this, Jennifer's Body writer Diablo Cody and director Karyn Kusama have not referenced it as an influence.

The music video for Sabrina Carpenter's "Taste" features a visual reference to the scene where a character is impaled by a white picket fence.

The album WLFGRL by Machine Girl samples Ginger Snaps on several tracks, those being "Out by 16, Dead on the Scene", "Ginger Claps", "Excruciating Death (phase γ)", and "Phase α".

== See also ==
- List of cult films

== Works cited ==
=== Books ===
- Mathijs, Ernst (2013). John Fawcett's Ginger Snaps. University of Toronto Press. doi:10.3138/9781442668713. ISBN 9781442668713.

=== News ===
- Blichert, Frederick (August 5, 2020). "'Ginger Snaps' Was a Monster Win for Canadian Cinema". Vice. Archived from the original on January 25, 2025.
- Tobias, Scott (October 29, 2009). "Ginger Snaps". The A.V. Club. Archived from the original on January 19, 2025.
