= Graham Robertson =

Graham Robertson may refer to:

- Graham Robertson (filmmaker)
- Graham Robertson (bowls)
- W. Graham Robertson, British painter, illustrator and author

== See also ==
- Graeme Robertson (disambiguation)
