= Michelle Nolden =

Canadian actress (born 1973)

- Born: March 17, 1973 (age 53)
- Occupation: Actress
- Years active: 1998–present
- Spouse: Chris Szarka
- Children: 3

Michelle Nolden is a Canadian actress. She has appeared in numerous films and television shows including Murdoch Mysteries, ZOS: Zone of Separation, Numb3rs, Street Time, Earth: Final Conflict, The Time Traveler's Wife, Men with Brooms, and Republic of Doyle as well as directing and writing a film called Loonie. She has been nominated for an ACTRA Award and a Gemini Award. She is married to Chris Szarka, executive producer of Showcase's Rent a Goalie, and they have three sons named Alex, Joseph and Michael.

== Filmography ==
=== Film ===
year	title	role	Notes
2000	Moon Palace	Alice	Short
2000	Blur	Anna	
2001	Century Hotel	Eloise	
2002	Men with Brooms	Julie Foley	
2002	Deceived	Smitty Turner	Video
2002	Winter Sun	Iona	Short
2002	Minor Adjustments	Clare	Short
2004	Safe	Wrae	Short
2004	Show Me	Sarah	
2005	The Perfect Man	Amber	
2005	Lucid	Chandra	
2007	All Hat	Gena Stanton	
2007	Cursing Hanley	Margo	Short
2007	Congratulations Daisy Graham	Young Daisy	Short
2009	The Time Traveler's Wife	Annette DeTamble	
2009	Fading Fast	Jayne	Short
2010	St. Roz	Sharon Gold	
2010	Red	Michelle Cooper	
2012	Come Dance with Me/Christmas Dance	Christine	
2013	Haunter	Carol Johnson	
2013	Carrie	Estelle Parsons	
2013	Skating to New York	Jessie Demas	
2013	Hardsell	Eve	Short
2015	A Christmas Horror Story	Diane Bauer	
2016	Prisoner X	Carmen	
2021	Die in a Gunfight	Beatrice Rathcart	
2024	Home Free	Rain Homur	

=== Television ===
year	title	role	Notes
1998-2000	Earth: Final Conflict	Anna, T'than	6 episodes
1999	Relic Hunter	Lori	"Smoking Gun"
1999	Twice in a Lifetime	Melanie	"A Match Made in Heaven"
2000	La Femme Nikita	Monique	"Line in the Sand"
2000	Earth: Final Conflict	T'than	Recurring role
2000	The Zack Files	Tara Bond	"Crypt Seeker"
2001	Largo Winch	Anya	"Endgame"
2001	A Nero Wolfe Mystery	Miss Bailey	"The Doorbell Rang"
2002	A Nero Wolfe Mystery	Helen Iacono	"Poison à la Carte"
2002	You Belong to Me	Dee	Television film
2002	The 5th Quadrant	Dr. Jasmine Venus	1 episode
2002–2003	Street Time	Rachel Goldstein	Main role
2003	Rudy: The Rudy Giuliani Story	Cristyne Lategano	Television film (USA)
2003	Hemingway: That Summer in Paris	Hadley Hemingway	Television film
2003	Martha, Inc.: The Story of Martha Stewart	Norma Collier	Television film (NBC)
2003	Cybermutt	Juliet	Television film
2004	The Shields Stories	Anne	Television mini-series
2004	The Eleventh Hour	Zoe Kent	"I'll Build Me an Island"
2004	Kevin Hill	Robin Tate	"Pilot"
2004	ReGenesis	Dr. Lauren Foley	"The Trials", "Faint Hope"
2005	Falcon Beach	Alex	Television film (ABC Family)
2005	Betting on Love	Kylin	Television film (Canada)
2005	Ghost Whisperer	Gwen Alexander	"Mended Hearts"
2005	CSI: Miami	Valerie Naff	"Payback"
2006	Crossing Jordan	Dr. Amy Bowen	"Mysterious Ways", "Mace vs. Scalpel"
2006	Everwood	Kathy Carmody	"Enjoy the Ride", "Foreverwood: Part 1"
2006–2010	Numbers	AUSA Robin Brooks	Recurring role
2007	Rent-a-Goalie	Mrs. Almost	"Rabies Almost", "B-Boys"
2007–present	Heartland	Jessica Cook	Guest role in Season 1, Recurring role since Season 14.
2009	ZOS: Zone of Separation	Sean Kuzak	Television mini-series
2010	Cra$h & Burn	Sonia DeRossi	"Lawyers, Guns & Money"
2010	Rookie Blue	Kathryn Leigh	"Girlfriend of the Year"
2011	Murdoch Mysteries	Susannah Murdoch / Reverend Mother	"Voices"
2011	The Listener	Isabel Dessante	"To Die For"
2011	John A.: Birth of a Country	Anne Nelson Brown	Television film (Canada)
2011–2014	Republic of Doyle	Allison Jenkins	Recurring role
2012	Covert Affairs	Megan Carr	"Man in the Middle", "Scary Monsters (and Super Creeps)", "Quicksand"
2012	Flashpoint	Prof. Butler	"Keep the Peace: Part 1"
2012	Christmas Dance	Christine	Television film (Hallmark)
2012–2013	Nikita	Kathleen Spencer	Recurring role
2012–2017	Saving Hope	Dr. Dawn Bell	Main role
2013	Cracked	Esme Belk-Wallace	"The Light in Black"
2014–15	Lost Girl	Freyja	"Like Hell: Part 1", "Sweet Valkyrie High"
2016	Running for Her Life	Dr. Laura Stevens	Television film (Canada)
2017	Designated Survivor	Catherine Cray	"Two Ships"
2018	Impulse	Wendy	"The Eagle and the Bee", "New Beginnings"
2019	Northern Rescue	Sarah West	Main Cast
2020	October Faction	Hannah Mercer	Recurring role
2020	The Wedding Planners	Marguerite	Recurring role
2020	Tiny Pretty Things	Katrina Whitlaw	Recurring role
2024	Sullivan's Crossing	Alysa Mackenzie	Recurring role
