= Emily Perkins =

Canadian actress (born 1977)

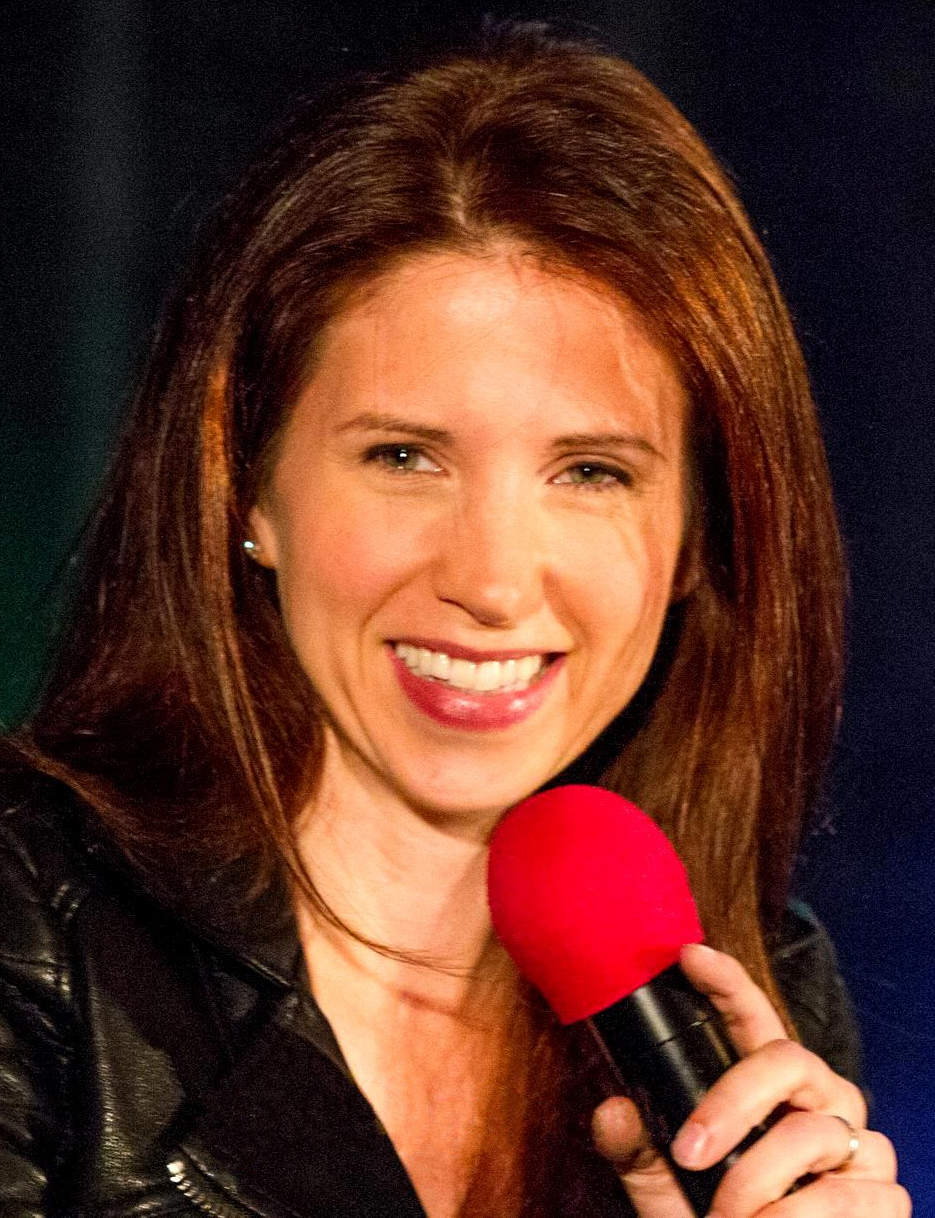
- Perkins at a Supernatural convention in Vancouver in 2013
- Born: Emily Jean Perkins; May 4, 1977 (age 49); Vancouver, British Columbia, Canada
- Occupations: Actress, school teacher
- Years active: 1989–2019

Emily Jean Perkins (born May 4, 1977) is a Canadian retired actress, known for her roles as Crystal Braywood in the TV series Hiccups, young Beverly Marsh in Stephen King's It, and Brigitte Fitzgerald in Ginger Snaps. Since the late 1980s, she has appeared in various films and television series.

== Early life ==
Perkins was born in Vancouver, British Columbia. Her father is Sicilian and her mother is of Scottish and English ancestry.

== Career ==
As a child actress, she appeared in three made-for-television films: Small Sacrifices, Anything to Survive, and Stephen King's It.

In 1998, Perkins took a supporting role in the Canadian TV crime-drama series Da Vinci's Inquest as Carmen in the episode "The Most Dangerous Time". She returned to the series in 2001 to take a recurring, supporting role as the prostitute Sue Lewis for a further 34 episodes, a role which earned her a Leo Award for Best Supporting Performance in 2003.

In 2000, Perkins starred in the film Ginger Snaps as Brigitte Fitzgerald opposite of Katharine Isabelle as Ginger Fitzgerald. In 2004, she starred in two back-to-back films, a sequel titled Ginger Snaps 2: Unleashed, and a prequel titled Ginger Snaps Back: The Beginning. Her role in Ginger Snaps gained her Best Actress award at the Málaga International Week of Fantastic Cinema in 2001. Ginger Snaps 2: Unleashed is Perkins' largest role in a film. In 2004 the horror magazine Fangoria awarded Perkins their Chainsaw Award for her work in GS2: Unleashed.

Perkins had supporting roles in She's the Man, Another Cinderella Story (where she reunited with Isabelle), and a small role as a receptionist in Juno. She stars in the thriller Blood: A Butcher's Tale.

In 2009 and 2011, she appeared as "superfan" Becky Rosen in the CW TV series Supernatural. She reprised her role in 2019 for the 15th and final season of the show.

Starting in March 2010, Perkins played the regular role of Crystal Braywood in the Canadian TV comedy series Hiccups. After two seasons the show was cancelled.

== Personal life ==
She used to be married to Belgian Canadian academic Ernest Mathijs, who has written about cult films, including her roles in the Ginger Snaps series.

== Filmography ==
=== Film ===
| Year | Title | Role | Notes |
|---|---|---|---|
| 1989 | Small Sacrifices | Karen Downs | |
| 1989 | Little Golden Book Land | Katy Caboose (voice) | |
| 1990 | Anything to Survive | Krista | |
| 1993 | Miracle on I-880 | Desiree Helm | |
| 1993 | Woman on the Ledge | Abby | |
| 1994 | Moment of Truth: Broken Pledges | Suzanne Stevens | |
| 1996 | In Cold Blood | Kathy Ewalt | |
| 1996 | Past Perfect | Karen "shy girl" Daniels | |
| 2000 | Ginger Snaps | Brigitte Fitzgerald | |
| 2000 | Christy: Return to Cutter Gap | Zady Spencer | |
| 2001 | Christy: A Change of Seasons | Zady Spencer | |
| 2001 | Christy: A New Beginning | Zady Spencer | |
| 2001 | Prozac Nation | Ellen | |
| 2002 | Insomnia | Girl reading a speech in the funeral | |
| 2004 | Ginger Snaps 2: Unleashed | Brigitte Fitzgerald | |
| 2004 | Ginger Snaps Back: The Beginning | Brigitte Fitzgerald | |
| 2006 | She's the Man | Eunice Bates | |
| 2007 | Juno | Punk Receptionist | |
| 2008 | Another Cinderella Story | Brittany "Britt" Blatt | |
| 2010 | Blood: A Butcher's Tale | Goth Chick | |
| 2010 | Repeaters | Jumper | |
| 2014 | Extraterrestrial | Nancy | |
| 2021 | Pennywise: The Story of It | Herself | |

=== Television ===
| Year | Title | Role | Notes |
|---|---|---|---|
| 1989 | Danger Bay | Shannon Darcus | Episode "Up The Coast" |
| 1990 | It | Young Beverly Marsh | Miniseries |
| 1990 | Mom P.I. | Marie Sullivan | Season 1 regular |
| 1993 | The Odyssey | Tower Council Member | Episode "Welcome to the Tower" |
| 1998 | The X-Files | Dara Kernof/Paula Koklos/Roberta Dyer | Episode "All Souls" |
| 1998 | Da Vinci's Inquest | Carmen | Episode "The Most Dangerous Time" |
| 2001–2005 | Da Vinci's Inquest | Sue Lewis | Season 4-7 Regular |
| 2002 | The Twilight Zone | Dina | Episode "Night Route" |
| 2002 | Mentors | Mary Shelley | Episode "Transition" |
| 2004 | Dead Like Me | Josie Feldman | Episode "Haunted" |
| 2007 | Aliens in America | Brenda | Episode "Church" |
| 2009–2011; 2019 | Supernatural | Becky Rosen | 4 episodes |
| 2010 | Hiccups | Crystal Braywood | Series Regular |
| 2014 | When Calls the Heart | Marty Crocker | Episodes "Cease and Desist", "Lost and Found" |

== Awards and nominations ==
| Year | Title | Awards | Category | Result | Ref(s) |
|---|---|---|---|---|---|
| 1990 | Small Sacrifices | YTV Achievement Award | Best young actress | Won | |
| 2001 | Ginger Snaps | Málaga International Week of Fantastic Cinema | Best Actress | Won | |
| 2002 | Ginger Snaps | Fangoria Chainsaw Awards | Best Actress | Nominated | |
| 2003 | Da Vinci's Inquest | Leo Awards | Best supporting actress in a drama series | Won | |
| 2005 | Ginger Snaps 2: Unleashed | Fangoria Chainsaw Awards | Best Actress | Won | |
| 2005 | Ginger Snaps 2: Unleashed | Fangoria Chainsaw Awards | Fangoria Horror Hall of Fame | Inducted | |
