= Ocean Hellman =

Canadian actress

- Born: Crystal Ocean Supri Heavenly Blue Sky Hellman; 8 November 1971 (age 54); Victoria, British Columbia, Canada
- Occupation: Actress
- Years active: 1974–2006

Crystal Ocean Supri Heavenly Blue Sky Hellman (born 8 November 1971), known shortly as Ocean Hellman, is a Canadian former actress who began her acting career as a child actress when she was 3 years old. Hellman is best known for her role in the television series Danger Bay (1984–1990), for which she was nominated for the Gemini Award for Best Performance by a Lead Actress in a Continuing Dramatic Role.

== Filmography ==
=== Movies ===
Year	Title	Role	Notes
1983	The Haunting Passion	Tracy	TV movie
1983	The Best Christmas Pageant Ever	Alice	TV movie
1990	Anything to Survive	Wendy	TV movie
1995	Mixed Blessings	Sam Goode	TV movie
2000	We All Fall Down	Michael's mother	TV movie
2001	Voyage of the Unicorn	Titania	TV movie
2001	Along Came a Spider	Amy Masterson	Cinema release

=== TV series ===
Year(s)	Title	Role	Notes
1984–1989	Danger Bay	Nicole Roberts	
1985	Constable Constable		
1988–1989	Almost Grown	Anya Foley	
1990	21 Jump Street	Suzanne Ross	Season 5, episode 8: "The Girl Next Door" (December 1, 1990)
1991–1992	Neon Rider		
1994	Northern Exposure	Iris	Season 5, episode 16: "Northern Hospitality" (February 28, 1994)
1996	Highlander: The Series	Alexa Bond	Season 4
1997	Dead Man's Gun		
1997–1999	Poltergeist: The Legacy		
1997–2001	The Outer Limits	Miriam Turner	Season 3, episode 8: "Heart's Desire" (February 28, 1997)
1997–2001	The Outer Limits	pregnant woman	Season 6, episode 17: "Gettysburg" (July 28, 2000)
1997–2001	The Outer Limits	Fern	Season 7, episode 4: "The Surrogate" (April 6, 2001)
1999	Millennium		
1999	So Weird		
2001	Mysterious Ways		
2002	Beyond Belief: Fact or Fiction		
2003	Jeremiah		
2006	Masters of Horror	Mary	Season 2, episode 1: "The Damned Thing" (October 27, 2006)

== Awards and nominations ==
Year	Award	Category	Title of work	Result	Refs
1988	Gemini Award	Best Performance by a Lead Actress in a Continuing Dramatic Role	Danger Bay	Nominated	
1989	Young Artist Award	Best Young Actress in a Cable Family Series	Danger Bay	Nominated	
1989	Young Artist Award	Best Young Actress Featured, Co-starring, Supporting, Recurring Role in a Comedy or Drama Series or Special	Almost Grown	Nominated	
1990	Gemini Award	Best Performance by a Supporting Actress	Anything to Survive	Nominated	
1993	Gemini Award	Best Guest Performance in a Series by an Actor or Actress	Neon Rider (for episode #3.6: "Labour Day")	Nominated	
