= Married to a Stranger =

1997 television film directed by Sidney J. Furie

- Genre: Romance; Drama
- Written by: Susan Black
- Directed by: Sidney J. Furie
- Starring: Jaclyn Smith; Robert Clohessy; Kim Coates
- Music by: Paul Zaza
- Countries of origin: United States; Canada
- Original language: English

Production
- Executive producer: Albert S. Ruddy
- Producers: Jeffrey Barmash; George Erschbamer
- Cinematography: David Geddes
- Editor: Nick Rotundo
- Running time: 120 minutes
- Production companies: Cinevu Films; MTM Enterprises

Original release
- Network: The Family Channel
- Release: September 28, 1997

Married to a Stranger is a 1997 American-Canadian made-for-television romantic drama film starring Jaclyn Smith, Robert Clohessy and Kim Coates. It premiered on The Family Channel on September 28, 1997. It was directed by Sidney J. Furie.

== Plot ==
A middle-aged woman named Meagan develops amnesia after a blow to the head, and can no longer remember anything that happened since age 16. Meagan can't remember her 16-year-old daughter Lacey, nor her husband of 20 years, David. Jesse, a psychiatrist, tries to help her discover her identity. Meagan had an art scholarship in Paris but never attended college, eloping eloped because she was pregnant. She remembers seeking out colleges to attend and wanted to know why she never went to college.

Meagan tells Jesse she desires to live alone and he arranges for her to move into a friend's apartment. Meagan takes art classes and wants to go to Italy to learn painting. Meagan and David go on dates to try to reunite. David is jealous about Jesse and blames him for Meagan moving out on her own. Meagan feels trapped and tells David that she must move forward in order to determine if they can resolve their lives together. David buys her ticket to Italy.

Meagan's memories of her marriage return as she paints. She remembers David giving her the night sky as a wedding gift, and picking roses for her to walk down the aisle when they eloped. She decides to not go to Italy. Meagan and David dance under the open sky, and he proposes to her. They plan a renewed wedding ceremony and she asks her father to give her away. Later while speaking with her mother Meagan learns that she had a son named Douglas who had been killed on the way on the way to the hospital.

Their friends and family show up for the ceremony, but Meagan is missing. David suspects she is at the graveyard looking at Douglas' grave. Meagan fears what other painful memories might be recovered. David and Meagan chosse to face the unknown together and they skip out on their wedding on a motorcycle.

== Cast ==
- Jaclyn Smith as Megan Potter
- Robert Clohessy as David Potter
- Kim Coates as Dr. Jesse Bethan
- Ed Lauter as Harry, Megan's Father
- Lorena Gale as Jerry, David's Assistant
- Katharine Isabelle as Lacey Potter
- Louise Fletcher as Nana, Megan's Mother

== Reception ==
Variety said, "Production as designed by Brian Davie is handsome, and David Geddes’ camerawork catches the Smith beauty and that of the Vancouver locations. Paul Zaza’s score is pretty, but undistinguished."
