= Evelyne Datl =

Canadian musician, composer, and record producer

Evelyne Datl is a Canadian musician, record producer, and composer of music for film and television.

Datl has played piano/keyboards in live performance and on recordings of many award-winning Canadian artists, notably Shirley Eikhard, Alannah Myles, Lorraine Segato, and The Parachute Club, as well as many indie artists in the Queen West Scene.

Her film and television work can be heard on the television shows Adventures of Dudley the Dragon, The Big Comfy Couch, and What's for Dinner?, as well as in several feature films (Show Me), dramatic series (Crimes of Passion), and documentaries.

She has produced several artists as well as her own self-titled CD. She also appeared on the television series Eric's World as a musician in the band from 1991 to 1995.
