= Diane Downs =

American murderer (born 1955)

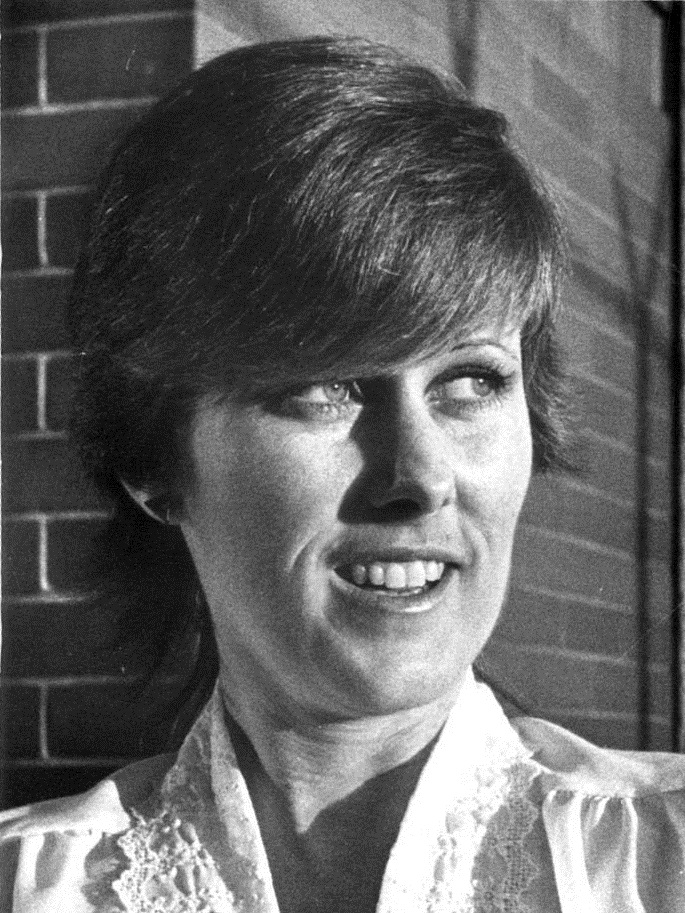
- Downs in 1984
- Born: Elizabeth Diane Frederickson; August 7, 1955 (age 71); Phoenix, Arizona, U.S.
- Occupation: Postal worker
- Spouse: Steve Downs (m. 1973; div. 1980)
- Children: 4
- Status: Incarcerated, earliest possible release 2032
- Convictions: Murder; Attempted murder (2 counts); Criminal assault (2 counts)
- Penalty: Life imprisonment with the possibility of parole after 25 years
- Escaped: July 11–21, 1987

Details
- Date: May 19, 1983
- Location: Springfield, Oregon
- Killed: 1
- Injured: 3
- Date apprehended: February 28, 1984

Elizabeth Diane Downs (née Frederickson, born August 7, 1955) is an American woman who murdered her daughter and attempted to murder her other two children on May 19, 1983, in Oregon. She claimed to police that a man had shot her and the children during an attempted carjacking.

In 1984, she was sentenced to life in prison with the possibility of parole after twenty-five years. She escaped in 1987 and was recaptured after ten days. Downs has been repeatedly denied parole, and has been diagnosed with narcissistic, histrionic, and antisocial personality disorders, and labelled a "deviant sociopath".

== Early life ==
Downs was born Elizabeth Diane Frederickson on August 7, 1955, in Phoenix, Arizona, to Willadene (née Engle) and Wesley "Wes" Linden Frederickson (October 12, 1930 – September 30, 2017). They were of Danish and English descent and had married in April 1954. Downs' mother said she and Frederickson raised Downs and her four siblings "not to be crybabies." Downs testified that her father sexually abused her when she was a child, although she later recanted the allegations, and both parents denied any such acts took place.

Downs grew up in a family with strict conservative values, and her parents forbade her from wearing fashionable clothes or makeup, which led to her being bullied. After age 14, she became rebellious, experimenting with her style and asserting independence from her parents' rules.

== Early adulthood ==
She graduated from Moon Valley High School in Phoenix, where she met her future husband, Steve Downs. Downs continued the relationship despite her parents' disapproval. She enrolled at Pacific Coast Baptist Bible College in Orange, California, but was expelled after one year for promiscuous behavior and returned to her parents' home in Arizona.

On November 13, 1973, Downs married Steve (who had enlisted in the United States Navy) after running away from home. "I did not marry Steve for love", she said at her trial, "I married Steve to get out of the family".

Their first child, Christie Ann, was born in 1974; Cheryl followed in 1976. She ended her next pregnancy with an abortion, but after witnessing pictures of fetuses at an anti-abortion booth in a local fair, she regretted her decision. "I felt the need to do something to make amends for what I had done wrong", she testified. "When I had the abortion, I was led to believe that a six-week fetus is nothing more than mucus." Downs later testified that Steve had had a vasectomy, so she had an extramarital affair with a friend, Mark Sager, who became the father of her third child, Stephen Daniel, born in 1979.

Downs and Steve regularly fought over financial issues and alleged infidelities, which resulted in their divorce in 1980 when Steve discovered that Daniel was the result of an extramarital affair. On May 8, 1982, Downs gave birth as a surrogate mother to a girl named Jennifer, despite twice failing psychiatric tests due to signs of psychosis.

Downs worked for the United States Postal Service, where she was responsible for the mail routes in Cottage Grove, Oregon. According to Steve, she lacked any maternal instincts and treated her children like "crap": "Diane forbade everything to her children. If Danny demanded a little attention, she rejected him... but the worst was when one day I caught Cheryl jumping on her bed, I told her that it was not allowed. I made her sit down and think about what she had done. Cheryl remained calm while looking up and asked, 'Is there a gun here?' I replied that no and the reason for this question to which she told me: 'I want to kill me. My mom says I'm bad.'"

== Shootings and prosecution ==
On May 19, 1983, Downs drove a blood-spattered car to McKenzie-Willamette Hospital in Springfield, Oregon carrying her three gravely injured children. Upon arrival, Danny, aged 3, was paralyzed from the waist down; Christie, 8, had suffered a disabling stroke; and Cheryl Lynn Downs, 7, was dead. Downs herself had been shot in the left forearm.

Downs claimed that a strange man carjacked her on a rural road near Springfield and then shot her and the children. However, investigators and hospital workers became suspicious because they believed her demeanor was too calm for someone who had just experienced such a traumatic event. She also made a number of statements that both police and hospital workers considered highly inappropriate.

Downs claimed that, shortly before 10:30 pm on a drive home from a friend's house, she got out of her car on Old Mohawk Road after being flagged down by a "stranger." Downs claimed that this man ordered her to give him her car and that, after she pretended to throw her car keys into a nearby bush, the man walked up to her car and shot her children with a small-caliber pistol. Downs claimed the man walked back toward her and shot her in the arm before he ran northbound around a curve in the road. Downs drove her children to McKenzie-Willamette Hospital in Springfield. Diane described the shooter as having "shaggy, brown hair" and a "stubble beard."

On June 9, 1983, in an interview with The Oregonian, Downs claimed her children were sleeping at the time of the incident. Downs later altered her story, claiming during court proceedings that the man shot her in the left arm during a physical altercation between them, that the man then opened the driver's side door before shooting her three children, and that she was able to flee in her car because she pretended to throw her car keys and the man went to look for them.

Suspicions heightened when Downs, upon arrival at the hospital to visit her children, phoned Robert Knickerbocker, a married man and former coworker in Arizona with whom she had been having an affair. The forensic evidence also contradicted her story: there was no blood spatter on the driver's side of the car, nor any gunpowder residue on the driver's door or on the interior door panel. Knickerbocker also reported to the police that Downs had stalked him and appeared willing to kill his wife in order to possess him exclusively. He stated that he was relieved that she had left for Oregon and that he was able to reconcile with his wife.

Downs did not disclose to police that she owned a .22 caliber handgun, but both Steve and Knickerbocker informed authorities that she did. Investigators later discovered that she had bought the handgun in Arizona during her marriage to Steve. While investigators were unable to find the handgun, they did discover unfired cartridges in her home that had extractor markings matching those of the murder weapon. Most damaging, witnesses saw her car being driven very slowly toward the hospital, at an estimated speed of 5–7 mph (8–11 km/h)—contradicting her claim that she drove to the hospital at a "high speed" after the shooting. Based on this and additional evidence, Downs was arrested nine months after the shooting on February 28, 1984, and charged with one count of murder and two counts each of attempted murder and criminal assault.

Prosecutors argued that Downs shot her children to be free of them so that she could continue her affair with Knickerbocker, as she claimed that he let it be known that he did not want children in his life. There was testimony by the prosecution's psychiatrist, who diagnosed Downs as having narcissistic, histrionic, and antisocial personality disorders. These qualities meant that Downs also fit into the now-outdated profile of malignant hysteria psychopathy.

Stated in this testimony was that "she shows no remorse. She regards her children with no empathy and as objects or possessions. Any feelings she has for them are superficial and only extend to how they are part of her and her life." Much of the case against her rested on the testimony of her surviving daughter, Christie, who, once she recovered her ability to speak, described how her mother shot all three children while parked at the side of the road and then shot herself in the arm. Downs was convicted on all charges on June 17, 1984, and sentenced to life in prison plus fifty years. She was required to serve twenty-five years before being considered for parole. Most of Downs' sentence is to be served consecutively. The judge made it clear that he did not intend for Downs to ever be free again.

== Incarceration ==
Downs' sentence meant she could not be considered for parole until 2009. Under Oregon law at the time, as a dangerous offender, Downs would have been eligible for a parole hearing every two years until she was released or died in prison. In her first application for parole in 2008, Downs reaffirmed her innocence. She insisted that, "over the years, I have told you and the rest of the world that a man shot me and my children. I have never changed my story." Her first parole hearing was on December 9, 2008.

Lane County District Attorney Douglas Harcleroad wrote to the parole board: "Downs continues to fail to demonstrate any honest insight into her criminal behavior... even after her convictions, she continues to fabricate new versions of events under which the crimes occurred." He also wrote that "she alternately refers to her assailants as a bushy-haired stranger, two men wearing ski masks, or drug dealers and corrupt law enforcement officials." Downs participated in the hearing from the Valley State Prison for Women. She was not permitted a statement but answered questions from the parole board. After three hours of interviews and thirty minutes of deliberation, she was denied parole. Downs had parole hearings in 2010, 2020, and 2025, which were all denied. Downs maintained her innocence in all parole hearings. The Oregon Board of Parole and Post-Prison Supervision gave Downs a 6-year extended deferral and scheduled her next parole consideration hearing for 2031.

== Aftermath ==
Downs' two surviving children eventually went to live with the lead prosecutor on her case, Fred Hugi. He and his wife, Joanne, adopted them in 1986.

Downs was initially incarcerated at the Oregon Women's Correctional Center in Salem. On July 11, 1987, Downs escaped from her cell by scaling an eighteen-foot (5.5-meter) razor wire fence. For ten days, Downs managed to evade law enforcement—despite a fourteen-state manhunt—before she was recaptured. She received an additional five-year sentence for the escape. After her recapture, Downs was transferred to the New Jersey Department of Corrections's Clinton Correctional Facility for Women after heavy lobbying from Fred Hugi. The Salem prison was located 66 miles from Hugi's home in Springfield. During her ten days of freedom, Hugi had feared that Downs would attempt to travel there in hopes of contacting Christie and Danny. Despite significant security upgrades at the women's facility after the escape, state officials accepted Hugi's argument that the risk of harm to Christie and Danny, in the event of another escape, was too great for Downs to remain incarcerated in Oregon.

While in prison, Downs earned an associate degree in general studies. In 1994, after serving ten years, Downs was transferred to the California Department of Corrections and Rehabilitation. In 2010, Downs was relocated to the Valley State Prison for Women in Chowchilla, California, but was transferred out when the facility was converted to an all-male institution in 2013.

Prior to her arrest, Downs became pregnant with a fifth child and gave birth to a girl, whom she named Amy Elizabeth, a month after her 1984 trial. Ten days before Downs' sentencing, Amy was seized by the State of Oregon and adopted by Chris and Jackie Babcock, who subsequently renamed her Rebecca Babcock. As an adult, Rebecca appeared on The Oprah Winfrey Show and ABC's 20/20, where she discussed how she felt about her biological mother. Rebecca wrote to Downs in her younger years and has stated that she regrets the contact, regarding her mother as "a monster". In 2020 Rebecca was the subject of Season 2 of the podcast Happy Face, which portrayed her efforts to find her biological father.

Author Ann Rule wrote the book Small Sacrifices in 1987, which detailed Downs' life and murder trial. The book documented accounts by friends, acquaintances, neighbors, and Downs' surviving daughter Christie, who questioned the quality of her parenting. A made-for-TV movie, also titled Small Sacrifices, starring Farrah Fawcett as Downs, aired on ABC in 1989.

== See also ==
- List of homicides in Oregon
- Familicide
- Filicide
- List of murdered American children
