= J. Adam Brown =

Canadian actor (born 1983)

- Born: 3 March 1983 (age 43); Kingston, Ontario, Canada
- Occupation: Actor
- Years active: 1998–present

James Adam Brown (born 3 March 1983) is a Canadian actor.

== Background ==
J. Adam is a graduate of Ryerson University in Toronto, Ontario. He is best known for his role in the return episode of the cult classic TV series Are You Afraid of the Dark?.

== Filmography ==
=== Film ===
Year	Title	Role	Notes
2000	Snow Day	Bill Korn	
2002	The Fraternity	John Frazier	
2003	Fast Food High	Brimshaw	
2004	Show Me	Gas Station Attendant	
2008	Camille	Officer #1	
2014	Joy Ride 3: Roadkill	Rob	
2015	Zoom	Photographer / Announcer	
2017	The Hitman Never Dies	Jesse	
2018	Frat Pack	Sean	

=== Television ===
Year	Title	Role	Notes
1998	Goosebumps	Alan	2 episodes
1999	Are You Afraid of the Dark?	Peter	Episode: "The Tale of the Forever Game"
1999	Real Kids, Real Adventures	Adam	Episode: "Lost & Found: The Richard Prieur Story"
2000	Common Ground	Jimmy Allen	Television film
2000	The Ride	College Kid #1	Television film
2000	Mom's Got a Date with a Vampire	Boomer	Television film
2000	In a Heartbeat	Kenny	2 episodes
2001	Drop the Beat	Troy	Episode: "Sabotage"
2001	My Horrible Year!	Zack Bomback	Television film
2002	The Zack Files	Merlin	Episode: "Once and Future Zack"
2002	The Associates	Anthony Cross	Episode: "Revelations"
2002	Terrorised by Teens: The Jonathan Wamback Story	Gord	Television film
2002	Odyssey 5	Wade	4 episodes
2002	Save the Last Dance	Chaz	Television film
2003	Word of Honor	Young John Kelly	Television film
2004	The Eleventh Hour	Keith	Episode: "Gone Baby Gone"
2004	Sue Thomas: F.B.Eye	Scott	Episode: "Skin Deep"
2004	Wild Card	Steve Griswald	Episode: "Blind in a Faith"
2008, 2009	Little Mosque on the Prairie	Tree	2 episodes
2010	Pure Pwnage	Stoner	4 episodes
2011	The Listener	Donald	Episode: "Vanished"
2012	Degrassi: The Next Generation	Cash	2 episodes
2013	Dangerous Persuasions	Kerry Noble	Episode: "Highway to Hate"
2014	Republic of Doyle	Oscar Noonan	Episode: "Sleight of Hand"
2015	Rookie Blue	Adrian Locke	Episode: "A Real Gentleman"
2017	The Expanse	Haggard Belter	2 episodes
2017	Private Eyes	Café Owner	Episode: "Between a Doc and a Hard Place"
2017	Haunters: The Musical	Gent	17 episodes; also writer and director
2019	Designated Survivor	Crawford	Episode: "#nothingpersonal"
2019	The Handmaid's Tale	Young Guardian	Episode: "Mayday"
2020	Nurses	Jason Day	Episode: "Incoming"
2023	Reacher	Lieutenant Hughes	1 episode
2024	Star Trek: Discovery	Fred	Episode: "Red Directive"
