= Danielle Hampton =

Canadian actress

- Occupation: Actress

Danielle Hampton is a Canadian television, theatre and film actress.

In 2004 she starred as a regular cast member in the nationally televised soap opera Paradise Falls, playing the role of Charlene "Charlie" Piercy. In the same year she was also in the cast of Metropia playing Jordan. In 2005 she made guest appearances in Show Me Yours. Previous TV guest appearances include Kevin Hill (2004), Odyssey 5 (2002), and Code Name: Eternity.

Her first film role was in Ginger Snaps. Other film credits include White Knuckles (2004), Detention (2003), and If Wishes Were Horses (2002)

== Early life ==
Hampton's professional dance training began at age ten, and performed professionally before entering high school. She continued studying dance, while in high school at Earl Haig Secondary School in Toronto; and then subsequently at the George Randolph Academy.
