= Steve Hoban =

Canadian film producer (born 1964)

Steven Hoban
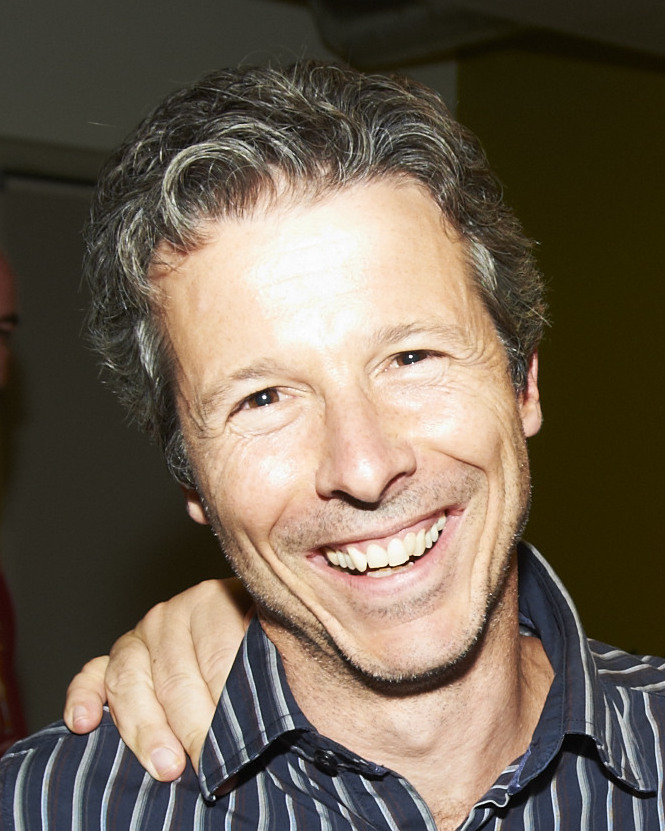
- Hoban in 2011
- Born: 1964 (age 61–62); Ottawa, Ontario, Canada
- Occupation: Film producer
- Known for: Splice, Ginger Snaps, "Ryan"

Steven "Steve" Hoban (born 1964) is a Canadian film producer. He has been nominated for three Genie Awards and won another. He has collaborated with Vincenzo Natali, David Hewlett, and Chris Landreth on multiple films. He is perhaps best known for Splice and the Ginger Snaps trilogy.

== Early life ==
Steve Hoban was born in Ottawa, Ontario, Canada, in 1964.

== Career ==
Hoban and director Vincenzo Natali are friends and have collaborated on several films, including Nothing, Splice, and Haunter. Hoban has also collaborated with Chris Landreth on animated shorts, including The Spine and Ryan, which won an Academy Award.

In 2001, Hoban co-founded 49th Parallel, a Montreal-based film production company. Among the early projects that they produced was Natali's 2003 film Nothing and Landreth's 2004 short Ryan. Hoban's new company, Copperheart Entertainment, is based in Toronto.

In 2013, he collaborated with Natali again to produce and direct the television series Darknet. This was his directorial debut.

A television adaptation of William Gibson's The Peripheral was put into development in April 2018, with Hoban an executive producer.

== Personal life ==
Hoban told Screen International that his favorite film is Taken, but not for creative reasons; Hoban said that he admires the film for its repeatable business model and success at the American box office despite its lack of traditional indicators of success.

== Awards ==
Year	Film	Award	Result	Ref
1997	Elevated	Canadian Screen Award for Best Live Action Short Drama	Nominated	
2005	Ryan	Academy of Canadian Cinema and Television Award for Best Animated Short	Won	
2010	The Spine	Academy of Canadian Cinema and Television Award for Best Animated Short	Nominated	
2011	Splice	Canadian Screen Award for Best Motion Picture	Nominated	

== Filmography ==
=== Films ===
Producer Credits
Title	Year	Notes
Half Nelson	1992	Short
Blood and Donuts	1995	
Elevated	1996	Short
Paint Misbehavin'	1997	Short
Ginger Snaps	2000	
CyberWorld	2000	Short
Nemesis Game	2003	Executive producer
Nothing	2003	
Ginger Snaps 2: Unleashed	2004	
Ryan	2004	Short
Ginger Snaps Back: The Beginning	2004	
Alter Egos	2004	Documentary about the making of Ryan
Black Christmas	2006	
Young People Fucking	2007	
Paradise	2007	Short
The Spine	2009	Short
Splice	2009	
388 Arletta Avenue	2011	
Haunter	2013	
Subconscious Password	2013	Short, executive producer
Wolves	2014	
Debug	2014	
A Christmas Horror Story	2015	also director
In the Tall Grass	2019	
Night of the Zoopocalypse	2025	also writer

=== Television ===
Title	Year	Notes
Darknet	2013	Also director
The Peripheral	2022	
