= Cold Front (film) =

- Directed by: Allan A. Goldstein
- Written by: Sean Allen; Stefan Arngrim
- Produced by: Sean Allen; Ed Richardson
- Starring: Martin Sheen; Michael Ontkean; Beverly D'Angelo
- Cinematography: Thomas Burstyn
- Edited by: Martin Hunter
- Music by: Braun Farnon; Craig Zurba
- Release date: 1989
- Language: English

Cold Front is a 1989 Canadian-American crime-thriller film directed by Allan A. Goldstein and starring Martin Sheen, Michael Ontkean and Beverly D'Angelo.

== Plot ==
The RCMP, the CIA, and the KGB are all in pursuit of a free-lance hit man who kills randomly-selected women, in addition to the targets he's been paid to kill.

CIA agent John Hyde (Martin Sheen) and his Canadian Mountie counterpart, Derek McKenzie (Michael Ontkean), investigate the murder of a Korean embassy employee, and end up in the middle of this jurisdictional nightmare, as does Hyde's ex-wife Amanda O'Rourke (Beverly D'Angelo), who is the assassin's next target.

== Cast ==
- Martin Sheen as John Hyde
- Michael Ontkean as Derek McKenzie
- Kim Coates as Mantha
- Beverly D'Angelo as Amanda O'Rourke
- Yvan Ponton as Inspector Dechesne
- Shelagh McLeod as Jeannie McKenzie
- Joshua Murray as Matthew McKenzie
- Katharine Isabelle as Katie McKenzie (as Katie Murray)
- Doug McGrath as Jackie Clearly
- Dale Wilson as Chaney
- Jan Rubeš as Zoubov
