= Graeme Robertson =

Graeme Robertson may refer to:

- Graeme Robertson (Australian footballer) (born 1952), Australian rules footballer
- Graeme Robertson (RAF officer) (born 1945), RAF commander
- Graeme Robertson (Scottish footballer) (born 1962), Scottish footballer

== See also ==
- Graham Robertson (disambiguation)
