= Ginger Snaps 2: Unleashed =

- Theatrical release poster
- Directed by: Brett Sullivan
- Written by: Megan Martin
- Based on: Characters by Karen Walton; John Fawcett
- Produced by: Steve Hoban; Paula Devonshire; Grant Harvey
- Starring: Emily Perkins; Tatiana Maslany; Eric Johnson; Janet Kidder; Katharine Isabelle; Brendan Fletcher
- Cinematography: Gavin Smith; Henry Less
- Edited by: Michele Conroy
- Music by: Kurt Swinghammer
- Distributed by: Lionsgate Films
- Release date: January 30, 2004
- Running time: 94 minutes
- Country: Canada
- Language: English
- Budget: $3.5 million
- Box office: $80,372 (US)

Ginger Snaps 2: Unleashed (also known as Ginger Snaps II or Ginger Snaps: Unleashed) is a 2004 Canadian horror film, written by Megan Martin and directed by Brett Sullivan. It is the second installment in the Ginger Snaps series and sequel to Ginger Snaps (2000), directed by executive producer John Fawcett and written in collaboration with Karen Walton. A prequel, Ginger Snaps Back: The Beginning, was filmed back-to-back with Ginger Snaps 2: Unleashed and was also released in 2004.

== Plot ==
Several weeks (Note: The exact passage of time is never specified, but Ginger Snaps ended on Halloween (October 31). Since this film is set in the winter, it has been at least a few weeks. On the DVD's audio commentary, director Brett Sullivan mentioned that it has been "maybe, probably six months". However, that would set the film in May, which is clearly not the case. Brigitte's injection records seem to indicate that a month or two has passed.) after the events of the first film, Brigitte Fitzgerald uses monkshood extract to fight the effects of lycanthropy that transformed her sister Ginger into a werewolf. Brigitte shaves off excess hair, cuts her arm with a scalpel, and documents her injections and increasingly rapid healing rate.

Ginger appears as an apparition and warns her that monkshood only slows her transformation progression and is not a cure. Regardless, Brigitte has become addicted to monkshood. While dosing for a second time in a motel, Brigitte detects the nearby presence of a male werewolf that has been relentlessly stalking her with the intention to mate, as it senses that she is in heat. As she quickly packs up and opens the door, she is found by Jeremy, a flirtatious librarian who has brought to her several books she attempted to check out earlier. He sees that Brigitte has toxic shock syndrome, and Jeremy attempts to bring her to a hospital; however, the male werewolf mauls him to death. Brigitte escapes but is too sick to go on. She stumbles down the street and collapses in the snow.

Brigitte wakes in an in-patient drug rehabilitation hospital, from which she unsuccessfully attempts to escape. She pleads to be released, but Alice, the clinic's director, refuses; however, Brigitte palms a piece of glass to continue to measure her healing. Tyler, an orderly at the clinic, offers to trade monkshood for sexual favors, which she declines. As her healing rate continues to accelerate, so does her rate of transformation and the dose of monkshood needed to resist it. Ginger continues to appear, taunting Brigitte as she experiences growing cravings for sex and murder, which Ginger also had. During a group therapy session, Brigitte fantasizes about her stretching class being instructed to lie on the floor and violently masturbate; a vision of Ginger jolts her back to reality, and her palm is revealed to be covered in hair. Later, a despondent Brigitte holds the shard of glass to her throat, but she does not go through with it.

While at the clinic, a girl named Ghost – the granddaughter of Barbara, a severe burn victim at the hospital – follows the clinical staff, who discuss Brigitte's injections of monkshood, and realizes Brigitte's secret. Ghost slips Brigitte a werewolf comic book and begins to question her about lycanthropy. When Ghost notices that Brigitte's ears have become pointed, Brigitte cuts off the tips. Ghost, now convinced of Brigitte's lycanthropy, attempts to slip Brigitte monkshood, but Tyler prevents it. In despair at her rate of transformation, Brigitte allows Tyler to inject her. After the male werewolf tracks Brigitte to the clinic, she and Ghost plan their escape. They crawl through air vents to reach the basement, where they encounter Beth-Ann, an addict who traded sex for drugs. The male werewolf kills and drags away Beth-Ann, and Brigitte is wounded after she fights the werewolf, but her wounds heal almost instantly.

Ghost drives them to Barbara's house and explains that Barbara fell asleep with her bedtime cigarette. The next morning, Brigitte eats a dying deer while it is still alive. Brigitte realizes that her rate of transformation is progressing too fast, and with no other choice, the duo arrange a meeting at a gas station with Tyler to procure more monkshood. When Brigitte wanders in the gas station, she discovers the attendant has been slain. Brigitte quickly returns to the car to find Tyler arriving, and, when they return to Barbara's house, Tyler administers monkshood to Brigitte, which her body violently rejects. Worried, Tyler calls Alice. Jealous of the attention that Tyler is getting, Ghost tricks Brigitte into thinking that Tyler abused her, causing Brigitte to lock Tyler outside, where the werewolf kills him. Alice arrives, and Ghost attacks her with Barbara's hunting rifle. Alice confronts Ghost about her delusions, and Brigitte, discovering that Barbara is not a smoker, aggressively pins Ghost against the wall and argues with her; she realizes that Tyler did not abuse Ghost, and Ghost burnt Barbara.

Alice attempts to take Ghost with her but retreats to the attic once the werewolf breaks in through a window. Brigitte, whose transformation is almost complete, lures the werewolf into a room. Brigitte stabs him while Ghost distracts the werewolf. The werewolf bites Brigitte, and, as they struggle, they both fall into the basement, where the werewolf is impaled on a booby-trapped mattress. Ghost kills Alice with a hammer, and a weakened Brigitte begs Ghost to kill her before the transformation completes. Instead, Ghost locks her in the basement and illustrates a comic book that depicts herself as a powerful warrior with a werewolf pet. Ghost narrates that Brigitte is getting stronger and is waiting to be unleashed on her enemies. A doorbell is heard, and Ghost prepares to welcome Barbara home.

== Cast ==
- Emily Perkins as Brigitte Fitzgerald
- Tatiana Maslany as Ghost
- Eric Johnson as Tyler
- Janet Kidder as Alice Severson
- Brendan Fletcher as Jeremy
- Katharine Isabelle as Ginger Fitzgerald
- Susan Adam as Barbara
- Chris Fassbender as Luke
- Pascale Hutton as Beth-Ann
- Michelle Beaudoin as Winnie
- David McNally as Marcus
- Shaun Johnston as Jack
- Patricia Idlette as Dr. Brookner

== Release ==
Ginger Snaps 2: Unleashed was released in Canadian theaters on 30 January 2004, and Lionsgate released it on home video in the United States on 13 April.

== Reception ==
Rotten Tomatoes, a review aggregator, reports that 88% of 16 surveyed critics gave the film a positive review; the average rating was 6.5/10. Dennis Harvey of Variety wrote that it "keeps most cliches at bay, and actually is less formulaic, even if storytelling and [performances] remain uneven". Liam Lacey of The Globe and Mail wrote: "Though less original and satiric than the original, and more decorated with gore and prank scares, the movie maintains the previous film's mordant tone". Brad Miska of Bloody Disgusting rated it 2.5/5 stars and called it "a major letdown" that "is an enjoyable film, yet nothing to get all psyched about".

Ernest Mathijs, in his book John Fawcett's Ginger Snaps, wrote that the sequel is "more radical and nihilist". He identifies the major themes as self-harm, drug addiction, and deconstruction of the themes explored in the first film.

=== Accolades ===
Year	Award	Category	Nominee(s)	Result	References
2005	Fangoria Chainsaw Awards	Best Limited-Release/Direct-to-Video Film	Ginger Snaps 2: Unleashed	Won	
2005	Fangoria Chainsaw Awards	Best Actress	Emily Perkins	Won	
2005	Fangoria Chainsaw Awards	Best Supporting Actress	Tatiana Maslany	Won	
2005	Fangoria Chainsaw Awards	Best Screenplay	Megan Martin	Nominated	
2005	Fangoria Chainsaw Awards	Best Score	Kurt Swinghammer	Nominated	
