= Karen Walton =

Canadian screenwriter

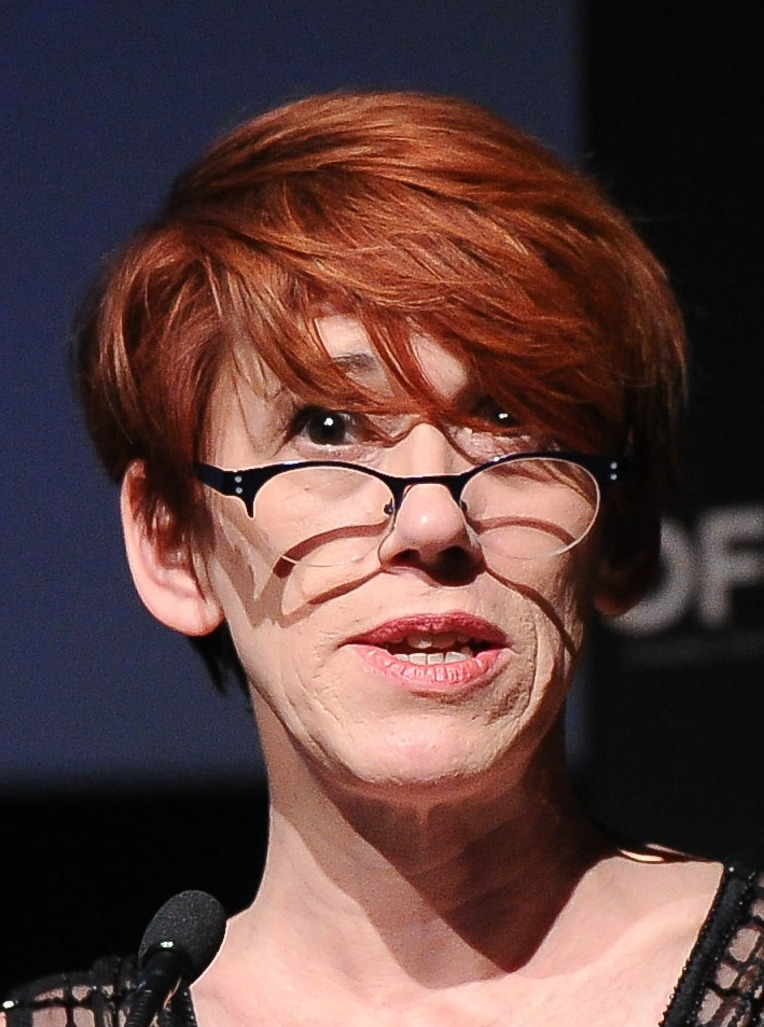
- Born: Halifax, Nova Scotia
- Occupation: Screenwriter
- Notable work: Ginger Snaps (2000)
- Awards: Nell Shipman Award; Margaret Collier Award (2016)

Karen Walton is a Canadian screenwriter best known for writing the film Ginger Snaps, for which she won the Best Film Writing Canadian Comedy Award in 2002. Her writing for the film received both critical scrutiny and academic analysis. Walton has since been recognised with multiple awards. She has also written for the Canadian television series What It's Like Being Alone and three episodes of the American version of Queer as Folk, for which she also served as executive story consultant. She appeared in the 2009 documentary Pretty Bloody: The Women of Horror. In recent years, she has served as a writer and producer on a number of Canadian television series including Flashpoint, The Listener and Orphan Black, which is distributed by BBC Worldwide and airs on BBC America in the United States.

== Early life ==
Karen Walton was born in Halifax, Nova Scotia, and grew up in nearby Dartmouth. As a teenager, she moved west to the suburbs of Edmonton, Alberta.

== Career ==
Walton had experience in acting before she began to focus primarily on scriptwriting. She began her work in the film industry by assisting local film production companies in Edmonton. After she entered and won a CBC radio play writing contest in the early 1990s her early work in scriptwriting gained traction. Walton was recognized and given access to lessons in screenwriting at the Canadian Film Centre where she later graduated. She has since been credited with establishing the online community inkcanada – Canadian Screenwriters and their Sketchy Friends, a digital venue where Canadian and international screenwriters can share their ideas.

== Awards ==
In May 2018, Walton received the Nell Shipman Award in Toronto for her contributions to Canadian film and television. Walton won the Margaret Collier Award for screenwriting in 2016, an award offered by the Canadian Screen Academy. Other past awards received by Walton include a Crystal Award for Women in Film and Television (specifically in the mentor-ship category), and the Denis McGrath Award for her contributions to screenwriters.

== Filmography (screenwriting) ==
- Elevated (1996)
- Straight Up (1998)
- The City (1999–2000)
- Ginger Snaps (2000)
- Heart: The Marilyn Bell Story (2001)
- The Many Trials of One Jane Doe (2002)
- Queer as Folk (2002)
- The Eleventh Hour (2003–2004)
- Ginger Snaps 2: Unleashed (2004) (characters based on)
- The Human Kazoo (2004)
- Flashpoint (2011)
- The Listener (2012)
- Orphan Black (2013–2014)

== Sources ==
- Ernest, Mathijs (2013). John Fawcett's Ginger Snaps. Toronto: University of Toronto Press. ISBN 9781442647596.
- Monk, Katherine (2001), Weird Sex & Snowshoes : and other Canadian film phenomena. Vancouver: Raincoast Books ISBN 1551924749
