= American Mary =

2013 film by Jen and Sylvia Soska

- Theatrical release poster
- Directed by: Jen and Sylvia Soska
- Written by: Jen and Sylvia Soska
- Produced by: Evan Tylor; John Curtis
- Starring: Katharine Isabelle; Antonio Cupo; Tristan Risk; David Lovgren; Paula Lindberg; Clay St. Thomas; John Emmet Tracy; Twan Holliday
- Cinematography: Brian Pearson
- Edited by: Bruce MacKinnon
- Music by: Peter Allen
- Production companies: American Mary Productions; Evolution Pictures
- Distributed by: IndustryWorks Pictures; XLrator Media
- Release dates: 27 August 2012 (Film4 Fright Fest); 18 October 2012 (Canada)
- Running time: 102 minutes
- Country: Canada
- Language: English

American Mary is a 2012 Canadian body horror film written and directed by Jen and Sylvia Soska and starring Katharine Isabelle, Antonio Cupo, and Tristan Risk. Isabelle plays a destitute medical student who begins taking clients from the extreme body modification community to solve her financial troubles.

== Plot ==
Desperate for funds, surgical student Mary Mason applies for work at a strip club. Billy Barker, the club's owner, is in need of a medical professional to patch up a man bleeding in his club's basement, the obvious victim of illegal dealings, and offers Mary $5,000 to perform emergency surgery. Mary accepts the money, but spends the next few days terrified that the criminal activity she got involved in will follow her home.

Mary is approached by Beatress Johnson, a stripper at the club who has had extreme plastic surgery to make herself resemble Betty Boop. She offers Mary a large sum of money to perform illegal surgery on her friend Ruby Realgirl in a veterinary clinic. Ruby wishes to be transformed into a human doll and has been unable to find a surgeon willing to complete the last step in her transformation: removing her nipples, all external genitalia, and partially suturing her vulva shut. Mary accepts, and a follow-up post on Ruby's blog introduces Mary to the world of extreme body modification.

Mary begins her residency in the surgical specialty, and her teachers and mentors praise her promising skills. Mary is invited by a doctor named Dr. Walsh to what she believes is a networking party with several of the head surgeons at her hospital; however, she finds she was the only young resident invited. The surgeons commit lewd acts on the others in attendance, who are escorts. At the party, Mary is drugged and raped by her former teacher, Dr. Alan Grant, who records it. Mary later drops out of her residency.

Mary hires Billy and his enforcers to kidnap Grant and deliver him to her apartment, where she holds him hostage and uses him as "practice" material for her extreme surgeries. Using pictures of Grant for her portfolio, Mary goes into body modification surgery full-time. Word spreads quickly through dark web channels that "Bloody Mary" is a surgeon of great skill willing to perform any extreme surgery desired.

Mary is later questioned about Grant's disappearance by police detective Dolor, explaining that her name was on a list Dr. Walsh gave him of women who might bear a grudge against Grant. While torturing Grant in a warehouse, Mary is discovered and attacked by a security guard, who attempts to free him, but Mary bludgeons him to death. Billy, who has become attached to Mary, kidnaps and beats Dr. Walsh on her behalf. Detective Dolor questions Mary again, believing that she was a victim of one of the sex parties hosted by the two missing doctors and hoping to help her.

Mary's grandmother dies, causing her mental state to deteriorate further. She finds Billy receiving fellatio from one of the strippers at his club and jealously attacks the woman with surgical tools in the bathroom. Due to police interest in her, Mary starts to worry that the video of her rape, which was supposed to have been destroyed, will be found.

Ruby's husband, vengeful after seeing his newly modified wife, tortures Beatress to near death for Mary's location before ambushing Mary at her house with a knife. He stabs her before she kills him in self-defense. Mary attempts to suture her own wound shut but ultimately bleeds to death in her operating room, to be discovered by the police.

== Cast ==
- Katharine Isabelle as Mary Mason, a medical school student and aspiring surgeon. Out of desperation, she performs extreme body modification surgeries to solve her financial issues.
- Antonio Cupo as Billy Barker, the owner of the strip club where Mary applies for a job
- Tristan Risk as Beatress Johnson, a stripper who has had herself surgically altered to resemble Betty Boop
- David Lovgren as Dr. Alan Grant, Mary's deranged and perverted professor at medical school
- Paula Lindberg as Ruby Realgirl, a fashion designer who wishes to become a human doll
- John Emmet Tracy as Detective Dolor, a Police Detective who is suspicious of Mary's involvement in Dr. Grant's disappearance
- Twan Holliday as Lance Delgreggo, one of Billy's enforcers
- Travis Watters as Mr. Realgirl, Ruby's husband
- Julia Maxwell as Tessa, Beatress' niece who works as a receptionist at a veterinary clinic

=== Cameos ===
The Soskas make an appearance as the demon twins from Berlin; their parents, father Marius and mother Agnes, also appear in minor roles as Dr. Janusz, a professor at the medical school, and a female police officer, respectively.

== Production ==
The film was shot in Vancouver, British Columbia, Canada. There were no postproduction visual effects; all visual effects are practical and many of Mary's patients were portrayed by members of the real-life body modification community. The role of Mary was written specifically for Katharine Isabelle. The script was written while the Soskas were trying to sell their film Dead Hooker in a Trunk and it mirrors some of the experiences that they had in the film industry, such as meeting sleazy people that seem initially reputable.

== Release ==
American Mary premiered at the London FrightFest Film Festival on 27 August 2012. It received a limited theatrical run in the U.S. on 31 May 2013 and became available on video on demand on 16 May 2013.

=== Home media ===
It was released on DVD and Blu-ray in the UK on 21 January 2013 by Universal Pictures UK. The release includes a behind-the-scenes documentary with cast and crew as well as a feature titled An American Mary in London, which detailed the world premiere.

== Reception ==
Rotten Tomatoes, a review aggregator, reports that 62% of 52 surveyed critics gave positive reviews; the average rating was 5.9/10. The site's consensus reads: "It suffers a bit from some uneven acting and an underwhelming climax, but American Mary utilizes pitch black humor and striking visuals to deliver gory, freaky thrills for body horror enthusiasts". It has a score of 46 out of 100 on Metacritic based on 15 reviews. Andy Webster of The New York Times designated it a NYT Critics' Pick and wrote that American Mary "combines gore, quiet dread, feminist conviction and a visual classicism, often using a red palette, with impressive, unbelabored dexterity." Joshua Rothkopf of Time Out New York rated the film 2/5 and wrote that the film starts out promising but ends up "going for the gross-out". Dennis Harvey of Variety called the film "outre and entertaining" but said it "doesn't develop all its narrative and thematic ideas to the fullest." Gary Goldstein of the Los Angeles Times wrote that the film "turn[s] slack and unfocused after an enticingly lurid, wickedly tense first half."
