= Bianca Montgomery and Maggie Stone =

Bianca and Maggie
- All My Children character
- Elizabeth Hendrickson as Maggie (seated) and Eden Riegel as Bianca (standing)
- Duration: 2003–07
- Created by: Gordon Rayfield and Anna Cascio (Note: While seeds for the couple's story were planted during Richard Culliton's tenure, Bianca and Maggie's actual romance doesn't start until the summer of 2003 during Rayfield and Cascio's tenure.)
- Introduced by: Jean Dadario Burke
In-universe information
- Other names: BAM
- Family: Kane
- Spouse: 2004–07

Bianca Montgomery and Maggie Stone are fictional characters and a supercouple from the American daytime drama All My Children. Bianca was portrayed by Eden Riegel, and Maggie was portrayed by Elizabeth Hendrickson.

Lorraine Broderick created and introduced Bianca in 1988, and Agnes Nixon expanded on the character, scripting her as a lesbian and making her the first lead character on a major daytime drama to be a lesbian. Hendrickson was originally brought on as character Frankie Stone; the storyline revolved around the close relationship of Bianca and Frankie, as well as the aftermath of Frankie's death. When her death attracted criticism, writer Richard Culliton decided to bring the actress back as the character's identical twin sister, Maggie Stone. Maggie debuted on the show in 2002, to investigate her sister's murder, and was immediately thereafter set up to bond with Bianca.

The two characters became the center of an on-again, off-again romantic flirtation that developed into a romance, which spanned four years all together. Star-crossed true loves, the pairing was planned to have various ups and downs; they sought friendship and security in their need for solidarity, and dealt with sexual confusion and ambiguity in their struggle to remain platonic.

Though the series paced Bianca and Maggie's relationship for three and a half years before making the couple's romance official, the pairing consistently intrigued the All My Children audience, as well as soap opera critics and LGBT outlets such as The Advocate and AfterEllen.com. They subsequently became the most demanded homosexual pairing in American daytime soap opera history, and are daytime television's first same-sex supercouple.

== Background ==
=== Writing ===
Before Frankie Stone's introduction, former All My Children head writer Richard Culliton already planned for her to die in a murder storyline after three months on the series. Culliton and ABC executives were surprised when viewers became attached to the romance between Bianca and Frankie, developed by Culliton with Frankie's debut. These fans attributed Frankie's death to the show's fear to focus on a lesbian romance. Eventually, Culliton came up with the idea to bring back the popular actress who had portrayed Frankie, Elizabeth Hendrickson, as the character's identical twin sister. He continued to write for the show until late 2002.

Television executive Brian Frons held a six-year position with SBS Broadcasting in the United Kingdom, where he worked on a number of popular reality shows. When he became head of ABC Daytime in 2002, he pushed for ABC's soap operas, which he felt had become cliché-ridden and predictable, to become more realistic. With Jean Dadario Burke as executive producer, Frons had ABC begin adding more depth to All My Children's Bianca Montgomery, the lesbian daughter of Susan Lucci's Erica Kane. Feeling that Bianca was defined only by her sexuality, they began writing her character "to become everywoman, to make her more real and to understand what makes her good or bad". Writers were initially uncertain whether to pair Maggie romantically with Bianca; they did not want Maggie to be a copy of Frankie, and subsequently scripted Maggie as heterosexual with various aspects of her personality different than Frankie's. Complicating matters further, Bianca was given a different lesbian love interest, Lena Kundera. At the time, in an interview reported by the New York Post, Frons stated that he considered the Lena and Bianca pairing "much bolder" than romantically pairing Bianca with "longtime" galpal Maggie. However, he expressed uncertainty about pairing Maggie with a man. "Maybe it will be decided that Maggie has no chemistry with Henry because she is a lesbian and wasn't ready to deal with it," he said.

When choosing Maggie's love interests, the audience often seemed to have as much say about the matter as Frons. Before Maggie's relationship with character Henry Chin came to an end, viewers refused to give their romance a chance, adamant that the only true love for Maggie had to be Bianca. Ivan Shaw, Henry's then-portrayer, relied on optimism. "I have definitely felt the heat from all of the Bianca and Maggie fans, but hope that the Henry and Maggie relationship will eventually win them over," he said. Viewers, however, were persistent in their opposition to Henry and Maggie's relationship, and the writers soon created an exit for Henry to leave town. Maggie is soon seen questioning her sexual orientation due to sensing romantic feelings on her part for Bianca. Early scenes between Bianca and Maggie revolve around the two romantically desiring each other but often secretly. As time goes on, conflict between Lena and Maggie becomes apparent. Maggie dates men to negate her sexual attraction to Bianca, her "coming-out" process designed as going from denial, to confusion, to acceptance of her sexuality — a portrayal lauded as representative of real-life experiences of lesbians and bisexual women. Bianca was not written to face exactly the same struggle with her sexuality onscreen; she largely comes to terms with her sexual orientation before returning to Pine Valley in 2000 after a time of absence from the series.

By the time Megan McTavish stepped in as head writer with Julie Hanan Carruthers as executive producer, McTavish explained that Maggie's involvement with character Jonathan Lavery was mostly a result of her feeling rejected by Bianca. Though the writers had Maggie accept her sexual interest in Bianca, the character was once again written to deny being sexually attracted to women; her relationship with Jonathan was now her main focus and the possibility of her wanting Bianca as a lover was now retracted. With viewers indifferent about the Lena/Bianca/Maggie love triangle, a story arc was written pushing a Jonathan/Maggie/Bianca love triangle. This second love triangle developed slowly, but included an aspect that kept viewers invested: Jonathan is presented as an abuser, and Bianca feels she must fight to free Maggie of his control. Maggie's new denial does not last long, and the character later admits her desire to start a life with Bianca.

Fan response to the Bianca and Maggie romance was mostly positive, and the arc worked towards the goals of realism Frons wanted to convey. He believed "it was very real and had not been done in daytime [television] before".

=== Actresses ===
Hendrickson had not originally planned on working on soap operas. She believed the medium would not challenge her acting. After a few years of struggling to acquire a steady acting job, however, she decided to give the daytime genre a chance and agreed to a contract role with the show. She soon came to regard the soap opera industry as challenging.

Eden Riegel, who signed on one year earlier and had formerly appeared on Broadway, was also apprehensive about joining a soap opera, but was convinced by her parents. She later attributed her reluctance to elitism.

Actress Olga Sosnovska was brought on as Lena Kundera, to add conflict to Bianca and Maggie's relationship; the writers introduced Lena in December 2002, as a "sassy" bisexual from Poland, characterized as a temptress "in the mold of Juliette Binoche". Sosnovska was asked if she realized that by accepting this role she would be stepping into "so much" controversy. "I’m still coming to terms with this phenomenon of Lianca," she replied, "with the devotion that I’m shown as a couple on TV, and the whole concept of fans. The letters that I get are heart breaking. It’s horrible that even now in the 21st century [so many lesbians] feel the need to hide. Not everyone is confident enough to face the world, and not everyone lives in a safe environment."

The couples became popular, but viewers and critics such as magazine Soap Opera Digest especially cited a positive working dynamic between Riegel and Hendrickson. The two women, though both heterosexual in real life, stated that they "just clicked" and enjoy each other's company.

When later queried on the viewer demand for a romance between Bianca and Maggie, the actresses relayed their support for gay and lesbian representation in television, with Riegel stating: "I think Liz [Hendrickson] will agree that it would be an amazing storyline. [...] I realize what an incredible opportunity we have to show a real love between two women that really speaks to people and can promote tolerance and respect." Hendrickson followed up: "That's one of the reasons that I took the role of Frankie. They didn't necessarily say that Frankie was going to be a lesbian, but they alluded to the fact that she could be. I felt that I could make an impact, and what better way to choose a role? I am more than willing to go that way."

Riegel and Hendrickson have described an emotional investment in their characters driven by impact on fans and positive fan response.

=== Music ===
Music within Bianca and Maggie's relationship consisted of soft rock, pop and the show's own original melodies.

In a less hectic time for the characters, an original song titled "All I Ever Wanted Was You" was played during a scene where Bianca and Maggie discussed their feelings for each other, but decided to remain best friends.

Original and featured music on the show was followed through by composers A.J. Gundell, Gary Kuo, Kim Oler and Jerry Pilato. In 2004, they were nominated for a Daytime Emmy in the 31st Annual Daytime Emmy Awards for Outstanding Achievement In Music Direction And Composition For A Drama Series.

== Storyline ==
In 2002, Maggie Stone comes to Pine Valley to investigate the murder of her twin sister, Frankie, whom Bianca mistakes her for at first sight. Their meeting is set up by Kendall Hart (Alicia Minshew), Bianca's sister, who loathes Bianca. She figures that Bianca will be hurt by seeing someone who looks exactly like Frankie, Bianca's deceased girlfriend. Maggie explains who she is, but Bianca is too happy to see Frankie's face and does not understand Maggie's words completely at first. Kendall's plan having backfired, Bianca and Maggie meet later, where they discuss Frankie in further detail.

Maggie reconnects with her family, Vanessa Cortlandt (Marj Dusay), Leo du Pres (Josh Duhamel) and David Hayward (Vincent Irizarry), whom she barely knows. Bianca bonds with Maggie. Together, they work to find Frankie's killer. After discovering Frankie was killed by her Aunt Vanessa's henchman, Maggie confronts Vanessa. Maggie is drugged and left to die in an abandoned pump house, but is rescued by David and Leo.

As time passes, Maggie begins to care for her family, but her bond with Bianca grows even stronger. She becomes furious, however, when a drunken Bianca attempts to caress her face. Maggie asserts that she is not a lesbian, unlike her sister. Bianca and Maggie later reconcile, and the two develop a solid friendship after Maggie assists Bianca in confronting some homophobic, high school bullies. They attend prom together as a platonic couple. Bianca develops the fear that she is using Maggie as a replacement to Frankie, and the sexual tension between the two causes Bianca to push Maggie into briefly dating good guy Tim Dillon. Bianca later provides comfort for Maggie when Leo is killed, and some time later decides to confront Maggie about her feelings. Maggie admits that she loves Bianca, but asserts that she is "into guys" and apologizes for not being able to be Bianca's lover. Bianca admits that she is hurt, but vows to move on. Maggie enrolls at Pine Valley University, where she enters into a romantic relationship with classmate Henry Chin. Despite the tension caused by Henry's traditional Chinese family, who see Maggie as a distraction, it is Henry cheating off of Maggie's test that causes their relationship to end. Bianca, also a student at the university, cheers Maggie up. Still looking for romance, she begins dating Lena Kundera (Olga Sosnovska), and becomes oblivious to Maggie's signs of jealousy.

In 2003, summer, Bianca is raped by Michael Cambias (William deVry); Maggie helps her through the mental anguish during the aftermath, and Bianca keeps the rape a secret from everyone else. She attributes her change in attitude to her ended relationship with Lena. Maggie tries to persuade her to go to the police, but Bianca convinces Maggie not to talk to them, saying that she will not either.

When Michael avoids punishment for raping Bianca and she relays to Maggie that she is pregnant with Michael's child, Maggie buys a gun and secretly plans to kill him. Bianca decides that she will keep the baby. Fearing that her mother, Erica Kane (Susan Lucci), will resent her baby due to having been raped before as well, Bianca decides that she is going to leave town to give birth to the child and inform everyone on her return that she adopted. Erica finds out about her pregnancy, however, and encourages her to have an abortion for her own sake. Bianca says that she will, but secretly changes her mind. During this time, Kendall finds out, and she and Bianca grow close. The two forge a deep bond.

Michael's dead body turns up before Maggie can kill him. It is revealed that as she stood outside Michael's condo, she saw two mysterious figures dragging a large bag from it, causing her to flee. Everyone a suspect in the Michael murder case at this point, Maggie tells Bianca that even though he deserved it, she could not have killed him in cold blood. Over time, Maggie begins to show more signs that she desires Bianca, making excuses to distance herself from her after making flattering remarks about her appearance. In 2004, Bianca announces to Maggie that she plans to move to Paris, so that she can give birth without her mother finding out. This causes Maggie to become emotional, and she confuses herself and Bianca when she kisses Bianca. Embarrassed, she abruptly leaves the apartment. She is panicked and immediately has sex with Jamie Martin (Justin Bruening) upon fleeing. When Maggie returns to the apartment the following morning, on Bianca's birthday, she tells Bianca that the kiss meant nothing. Immediately after their talk, she begins dating Jamie, as Bianca continues her romance with Lena.

Everyone becomes aware that Bianca is pregnant when it is revealed that her sister, who was covering for her, is not the pregnant one. The truth about Michael's death is soon unveiled, as it comes to light that Bianca killed Michael in self-defense, not remembering this until Michael's murder trial, where her sister and mother are both willing to confess to killing him. It turns out that the two figures Maggie saw that night at his condo were Kendall and one of Bianca's cousins trying to protect Bianca. The judge sees the painful ordeal Bianca has been through following her rape and Michael's death, and Bianca is not charged with any crime. More strife, however, comes when Bianca is told that the baby she just gave birth to is dead. Maggie becomes even more of a support line for her, but Lena leaves town to care for her ailing mother back in Poland. Maggie eventually professes her love to Bianca, feeling that this is her "coming out" moment. Bianca informs her that she does not want to begin a relationship with her because she is still in love with Lena and she does not want Maggie regretting her decision later. Hurt by Bianca's rejection, as well as her distorted perception of Bianca's bond with Babe Carey (Alexa Havins), Maggie distances herself from Bianca and begins dating Jonathan Lavery (Jeff Branson).

Maggie's relationship with Jonathan becomes abusive, when Jonathan believes Maggie is secretly in love with Bianca. Jonathan intentionally tries to isolate Maggie from Bianca, and proposes marriage to her. Maggie agrees, but Jonathan's jealousy turns physical against Maggie. Bianca becomes concerned with Maggie's relationship, as she feels that something is off about it and later believes Maggie to have lied about a bruise on her face. She visits Jonathan and Maggie's home while Maggie is alone and tries to reason with her to leave him. Her emotions get the better of her and she kisses Maggie. She confesses that she has fallen in love with her.

Initially dismissing Bianca's declaration of love, Maggie learns the truth about Jonathan's abusive past with his previous girlfriend and dumps him. Free from Jonathan, Bianca and Maggie decide to move to Paris with Bianca's newly discovered-alive daughter, Miranda (Haley Evans), in February 2005.

I was encouraging Kendall and Zach to get together, so I kept talking about how Maggie and I had been through a lot, but that we are now a full-fledged couple. We've definitely consummated our relationship off camera in Paris, and we're girlfriends! Bianca always rushes home to Maggie as soon as she's done with whatever crisis is going on in Pine Valley because she's the love of her life and Bianca really wants to get home to her.

— Eden Riegel

When Bianca returns for a Christmas visit to Pine Valley, she tells everyone that she and Maggie are an official couple in Paris, advising Zach Slater (Thorsten Kaye) to be happy with Kendall, because she is very happy with Maggie. Despite this, when she returns again near Thanksgiving in 2006, bringing her daughter with her, she informs everyone that Maggie had an affair with a woman named Cecelia. Bianca says that she would still take Maggie back. During a phone call, though, it is clear that Maggie does not want that. Bianca is left further devastated, but still voices to wanting Maggie. However, when Maggie shows up in early 2007 on Bianca's doorstep wanting to renew their romance, Bianca does not, and Maggie later has a confrontation with Zoe (Jeffrey Carlson), someone else who wants a romance with Bianca. Zoe is a transgender rockstar, biologically male but identifying herself as a lesbian woman. Zoe asks Maggie how could she cheat on Bianca, and Maggie angers. Harsh words are exchanged between the two. Before the confrontation is over, Maggie warns Zoe not to hurt Bianca, but notes that Zoe will never be Bianca's type, regardless.

On February 7, 2007, Maggie meets with Bianca at a park and kisses her, and Bianca admits that she has never stopped being in love with Maggie. Despite this, she agrees that Maggie should leave. She relays that she needs some time away from her, but that they can keep in touch through e-mails. Bianca informs her that there is still a chance that they may once again be together. Maggie hugs Bianca. "You were my first love," she says, and confesses, "You're my everything." She then walks away.

== Reception and impact ==
=== General ===
As one of the few lesbian romances depicted on daytime television, Bianca and Maggie's romance gave lesbian viewers a pairing they could relate to, and inspired closeted lesbian viewers to reveal their sexuality. In addition, the romance was appreciated by heterosexual fans. In 2005, the couple's second kiss (their first having taken place the previous year) was ranked #4 on TV Guide's list of the best same-sex kisses on television. The kiss was also listed as one of television's most "unforgettable kisses" in Andréa Demirjian's 2006 book Kissing, with the rating of "Really Good". In October 2008, Soaps In Depth named Bianca and Maggie one of soap opera's 100 greatest couples.

Bianca being brought back to the series in 2000 made her the first major character on a soap opera to come out as gay or lesbian. All My Children was consistently nominated thereafter by the Gay & Lesbian Alliance Against Defamation (GLAAD) for its "fair, accurate, and inclusive portrayal" of a lesbian teenager and her mother's process of coming to terms with her daughter's homosexuality. However, until recently, Bianca fell exclusively for perceived straight or unattainable women, which prevented her from having an on-screen girlfriend. GLAAD Director of Communications, John Sonego, contends that "Many young, newly out lesbians fall for a close friend, only to discover the friend is straight" and that on television "unrequited love...and heartbreak are what keep the viewers tuning in — and learning". Initially, Maggie, who continually asserted her heterosexuality, seemed to be a continuation of this trend.

=== BAM ===
Though GLAAD was pleased with Bianca's "coming out" storyline and awarded her their first Favorite Out Image of the Year Award, two years of no on-screen romance for Bianca frustrated fans who supported a relationship between Bianca and Maggie; these fans formed a shipping community that came to refer to the match-up as "BAM" (for Bianca and Maggie). In October 2008, Soaps In Depth named Bianca and Maggie one of soap opera's 100 greatest couples. According to their website, BAMFan members are a diverse group of all ages, economic, and cultural backgrounds, and sexual orientations and "want to ensure the story – the romance of Bianca Montgomery and Maggie Stone – is brought to the forefront of All My Children". BAM fans were vocal and persistent in campaigning to writers and executive producers of All My Children for inclusion of the relationship. They sent letters, videos, T-shirts, and roses to the network.

To enable others, particularly new viewers to the series, with easy access to the Bianca and Maggie storyline, BAM fans launched what they call "BAMChannel" on the video sharing site YouTube. The channel chronicles Bianca and Maggie's relationship, from their first meeting to their recent status, as well as Bianca's relationship with Maggie's deceased twin, Frankie.

Hendrickson in her All My Children dressing room, with Absolute BAM poster in the background.

The fans sent gifts to Hendrickson and Riegel. "I won't work for several days and then I'll come back and my room is filled with boxes. It's hysterical!" exclaimed Hendrickson, who cited her favorite gift as being her "Absolute BAM" poster, a reference to Absolut Vodka, and also confirmed receiving a wooden clock labeled "TIME FOR BAM!" Riegel received the gifts positively as well: "[BAM] sent me and Liz [Hendrickson] this big package with presents, hats and posters that say 'Absolute BAM'. All of them wrote us these wonderful notes about what the characters and the storyline means to them. I don't know how this happened, but I'm incredibly inspired and energized by it."

For her July 3 birthday, Hendrickson encouraged fans to donate to an animal shelter in her town instead of shower her with additional gifts. Most dramatically, BAM fans raised money to launch a blimp to hover above the building; this plan was not completed.

BAM fans' efforts drew the attention of leading soap opera magazines, which frequently commented on the widespread fan support for Bianca and Maggie's relationship; they were voted "Best Non-Couple" of the year by readers in the December 31, 2002 Soap Opera Digest issue.

LGBT newspaper The Advocate took notice of the pairing's support. "Ironically, the move to provide Bianca with a girlfriend might disappoint the fans who've been cheering the most for it," stated Web Behrens of the paper in her April 29, 2003, article. "When our lesbian protagonist finally gets her groove on, it won't be with Maggie, who flirted with Bianca for months, [spawning a devoted fan club named BAM]... But the object of Bianca's affection will instead be the mysterious bisexual Lena (played by Olga Sosnovska), a newcomer to the fictional town of Pine Valley."

Jean Dadario Burke, the show's then-executive producer, was noted as saying, "There was wonderful chemistry with Bianca and Maggie." Regardless, Brian Frons, who had become head of ABC Daytime, somewhat based his reasoning for not going through with the romance when demand for it was the most prominent. "Rather than trust that momentum, 'cowardly network people that we are, we did some research,'" he said. "After polling 1,500 soap fans about Bianca's love life, the network found that many viewers wanted Bianca to have a romance — with someone else." The assessment made by Frons differed from a previous article earlier in the year which cited the Bianca and Maggie fanbase as growing bigger and at an unprecedented level in American daytime soap opera history for a homosexual pairing. Three years after his 2003 comments, Frons titled Bianca and Maggie "the supercouple of daytime".

=== Maggie's sexuality ===
Substantial reasoning fans in the poll Frons alluded to may have wanted to see Bianca with another woman as opposed to Maggie was likely due to Maggie's ambiguous nature during her early relationship with Bianca. Fans consistently wondered whether or not Maggie was gay, which spun into "heated" debate regarding Maggie or Lena being better suited for Bianca.

Hendrickson weighed in on her character's mixed signals. "There's a huge question mark hanging over her head, isn't there?" she said. "But I think that almost any woman at that age [has one]. I think every woman and every man, at some point at their life... It's only natural to think twice about your sexual orientation."

Throughout their confrontation, Eden Riegel's Bianca was animated, her hands flailing haphazardly. Elizabeth Hendrickson's Maggie was withdrawn, her expression flat. Hendrickson imbued Maggie with just as much longing as Bianca, but toward a different goal: She wanted to separate herself from her twin, not just as a person but in her sexual identity. Maggie was acting just like a guy — evasive, foot-shuffling, slightly jokey, unable to find the right words. Finally she just said it, plaintively: "Bianca, I love you, I really do...but I'm into guys.

— Soap Opera Weekly

Maggie's sexual identity perplexed the soap opera media as well. Their confusion regarding Maggie's sexual identity led to Soaps In Depth putting Bianca and Maggie on the cover of a 2003 October issue detailing November storylines with the caption "Together At Last!", though the actual article did not document an opportunity of a romantic relationship between the two.

In a Soap Opera Weekly issue, editor Carolyn Hinsey and Soap Opera Digest/All My Children editor Mara Levinsky sat down to debate Maggie's sexual orientation. Hinsey felt that Maggie was a "flip-flopper" and that it was odd that she could "jump between the sexes" as quickly as she did when, in reality, she wanted Bianca. Levinsky argued Maggie's confusion and frustration. "She's on the rebound, and as likely if not likelier to go out with a guy to try to forget Bianca than a girl," Levinsky stated. "Maggie knows she's attracted to Bianca, but Bianca is the only girl she's ever been attracted to."

Maggie's sexual interaction with guys, however, was consistently scripted by the series to showcase itself as a direct response to her denying her feelings for Bianca or what she felt was Bianca having rejected her. Years later, the story reveals her attraction to women as not exclusive to Bianca.

=== Chemistry and confessions ===
Bianca and Maggie's romantic chemistry was complimented by critics, who deemed themselves fans of the pairing. Critics cited feeling cheated out of opportunities to see the full potential of the pairing's chemistry. TV Guide soap opera columnist Michael Logan dubbed the non-relationship as "Rip-Off of the Year" in his January 4, 2003, roundup of "The Worst of 2002". He stated:

AMC teased and titillated us mercilessly with the flirtatious sparks between openly gay Bianca (Eden Riegel) and her buddy Maggie (Elizabeth Hendrickson), but the show — once famous for its boldness — didn't have the guts to put them in a real romance, even though the fans are begging for it. C'mon, AMC! These two have more chemistry than any boy-girl duo in soaps!

Heather Havrilesky of Salon.com expressed her thoughts about the "never-ending sexual tension" between Bianca and Maggie as well. "Bianca hasn't seen any action at all, partly because she mostly manages to fall for straight or unavailable women, including her close friend Maggie," she stated. "The two characters have exchanged intimate gazes and frolicked provocatively in countless scenes, the tension becoming so unbearable that frustrated fans formed BAM."

Riegel and Hendrickson were asked by Soap Opera Digest what they thought accounted for their on-screen chemistry. While Riegel replied that "chemistry can't be faked, and when two people like each other, there's an energy between them that's undeniable", Hendrickson stated, "When I started, my friends were telling me what great chemistry we had, and I didn't notice it. But now that I've worked with probably half the cast, I realize what amazing chemistry we have together. I'll have to work with men and really, I'm heterosexual, but I have more chemistry with her! I'm trying to have romances with boys, but I don't know, I just feel it with her!"

Hendrickson captured, in the unaffected and eminently relatable fashion so typical of her AMC work, Maggie's mixture of certainty (of her love for and attraction to Bianca) and confusion (what does it all mean?).

— Soap Opera Digest

On June 13, 2004, New York Daily News became another aspect of the media taking interest in the love story when they reported the week in which Maggie would finally admit to being in love with Bianca. The news was followed by soap opera press covering the event as well. "It's the moment BAM fans have been waiting for on All My Children, but thought would never come: Maggie finally 'fesses up to Bianca about her true feelings for her 'best friend'," announced Soap Opera Digest. Hendrickson was excited about the revelation. She stated, "It's about time!" She expressed that she "could not believe [her] eyes" when she read the dialogue for her character. "When I read the scene where Maggie tells Bianca she loves her," said Hendrickson, "I was sure that the next day, Maggie would backpedal like she always does, like, 'I meant, "I love you as a friend."' I was so excited to get the next script and find out that she doesn't backpedal. She's honest, forward and open about her feelings. It took her two-and-a-half years, but she does it!"

Despite Maggie confessing her feelings to Bianca, Bianca is the one to turn down their chance this time; she expresses that her heart, in the romantic sense, belongs to Lena. The performance by Hendrickson in the scenes were praised by soap opera critics, who felt that it added new depth to the character.

=== Fundraising and merchandising ===
On July 8, 2003, Tori Amos's version of "I'm Not in Love" was featured prominently on the show during the scene in which Bianca is raped. The following day, the show broadcast a RAINN (Rape, Abuse, & Incest National Network) PSA after the program. In response to the rape storyline, fans of the Bianca and Maggie relationship organized a charity auction on eBay that ran throughout the month of July 2003 with all proceeds having gone to RAINN.

SOAPnet BAM ID bracelet

On November 1, 2004, SOAPnet, described as the new way to watch soaps, launched shopsoapnet.com. The site is an on-line shopping boutique which offers customers SOAPnet-themed items, including products from its original programs I Wanna Be A Soap Star and Soap Talk, as well as exclusive SOAPnet-brand merchandise. SOAPnet stated that they are always looking for unique ways to put a new twist on a long-loved genre. One aspect of their marketing was to make popular soap opera couples a part of the equation. With Bianca and Maggie's visibility as one of the more "in-demand" couples, ABC saw this as part of their market. "Soap opera fans have a history of supporting character couples and giving their favorite couples nicknames that combine the letters of the characters' names. For example, fans of a Nikolas and Emily pairing on General Hospital refer to the couple as 'NEM'. Shopsoapnet.com will honor this tradition by offering limited edition bracelets engraved with a few of these popular couple names including NEM and BAM. BAM honors a Bianca and Maggie pairing on All My Children," the press release stated.

The Bianca and Maggie (BAM) ID bracelet originally went on sale for $14.95, as seen in the ABC TV Store with the advertisement of the couple's star-crossed predicament:

BAM bracelet — All My Children’s Bianca and Maggie (BAM) may not be a soap super couple...YET! That doesn’t mean you shouldn’t show your support for the intriguing duo that can’t quite seem to get together (it’s like they’re distracted or something) with this stylish brushed-pewter/nickel-plated ID emblem featuring engraved lettering, a 6 ¾" velvet strap in forest green and adjustable chain strap. Limited edition.

In December 2008, Broadway Cares/Equity Fights AIDS, which raises funds for HIV/AIDS-related causes, started contest Battle of the ABC Daytime "Power Couples" for the 2009 year. Though no longer a couple and not on the Broadway Cares official list for the competition, Team BAM was created in honor of Bianca and Maggie and for the organization's cause. The team said Bianca and Maggie's story "never ended" and that for "the fans who fell in love with this couple, and watched them from the early days of friendship, through personal struggles and triumphs, with the hope that their dream would be realized and these two best friends and soul mates would finally be together, the story will live on forever". They stated, "When all the money was in and the final numbers tallied, Team BAM finished in the top 4." The team's goal was to achieve $500.00. They report having achieved $3,900.00.

=== Departure and return ===
Sarah Warn of AfterEllen.com had previously commented on All My Children stalling Bianca's romantic life by making her pregnant. Warn stated that it was a way to assure Bianca's continued asexuality. She added that "the pregnant-lesbian storyline" is a favorite refuge for television writers who both want to avoid dealing with the sexual aspects of lesbian relationships and who want to "normalize" the lesbian characters – "to show viewers that, at their core, lesbians are just like heterosexual women – who of course, all want to be mothers".

When Riegel and Hendrickson left their roles together in 2005, with their characters being written out as possible lovers, Warn's disappointment in the show's writing team remained. She cited Bianca and Maggie's progression toward romance only after leaving television screens, but detailed positive aspects of the story in an article entitled "The End of a Lesbian Era on All My Children". A farewell was given to the pairing, with Warn stating, "Today, as All My Children airs its final episode with actresses Eden Riegel and Elizabeth Hendrickson (who have left the series to try their luck elsewhere), we say goodbye to one of American television's longer-running lesbian storylines — a storyline which has alternately entranced, infuriated, delighted and frustrated viewers over the last four and a half years." Warn also commented on Bianca and Maggie's star-crossed dynamic, reasoning "while stringing out romantic storylines for maximum drama is appropriate and even expected in daytime television, it is also expected that, eventually, star-crossed couples do get together".

In early 2007, the series decided to bring the couple back. Viewers watched as Bianca relayed news that Maggie cheated on her while in Paris. Bianca fled back to Pine Valley, and Maggie soon followed to plead for her forgiveness. Viewers felt that it was out of character for Maggie to cheat on Bianca. Hendrickson was also upset about the storyline. Soap Opera Weekly magazine's January 23, 2007, issue quoted Hendrickson as saying that she found out about Maggie cheating on Bianca by watching the show (since her character had not returned to Pine Valley at the time). "I was screaming and yelling at the TV. I was very upset. It was a huge shock to me," she relayed. Although, there was something Hendrickson was pleased about with the storyline of Maggie returning to chase after Bianca — Maggie's sexuality. It was apparent that Maggie had come to terms with being a lesbian. While upset that Maggie cheated on Bianca, Hendrickson was content that Maggie cheated on Bianca with a woman, confessing that she had always felt that Maggie was leaning more toward the women than the men; she relayed her happiness about the writers having made a decision about Maggie's sexuality. Soaps In Depth also sought to clear up Maggie's sexual orientation when they cited her as a lesbian while recapping her history the week of her return.

Maggie being complete in her sexuality with Bianca was something viewers had wanted for years; it was tainted with the cheating storyline. Unlike Hendrickson, Riegel found the news of Maggie's betrayal refreshing: "It's so funny how the fans are all up in arms like, 'Maggie would never cheat!' When they told me Maggie was cheating, I went like, 'Woo hoo!' because an actor wants interesting stuff to play." Riegel approached the matter in humor and seriousness: "Oh yeah, Maggie's a slutty lesbian!" Riegel laughed, adding that "because Bianca has now lost this love, she's looking to reinvent herself and looking for answers".

Another element agitating the audience during and after Maggie's return was Bianca's romantic attraction to transgender Zarf/Zoe. Zarf/Zoe was still of the male form, and viewers felt that it was an "underhanded" way for the show to romantically pair Bianca with a "man" while getting around the reality of Zarf/Zoe's anatomy.

On January 15th, Maggie, Bianca’s not-so-ex ex, comes back to Pine Valley. And there was Bianca on New Year's Eve, after she fled from Zarf/Zoe, with old pal Leslie (really, the writers actually named the only other lesbian Leslie), who is clearly still ready to take a tumble with Bianca. So there are some actual lesbian lesbians available for Binx. Zarf/Zoe can develop her transgendered [sic] lesbian self with someone else, post surgery and hormones.

— Victoria A. Brownworth

Victoria A. Brownworth of the San Francisco Bay Area Reporter, Inc., a free weekly newspaper serving the lesbian, gay, bisexual and transgender (LGBT) communities, called the storyline a mess. Brownworth felt that it had an unhealthy angle to it, and made several comments voicing her and her publication's detest toward the romance.

TV Guide named Zarf/Zoe, as well as her storyline, one of the worst of 2007.

Maggie eventually returned to Paris at Bianca's request, but with a hint that they may once again be united. "Bianca still loves her," former head writer Megan McTavish assured the audience. "And yet, at the same time, I don't think it's a given that you necessarily forgive the person who cheated on you. So Maggie has an uphill climb."

=== AfterEllen.com interview and Reese Williams ===
Due to the continual fan support and demand for the pairing, Riegel and Hendrickson agreed to do a video blog interview with AfterEllen.com vlogger Bridget McManus on her show Brunch With Bridget, where they answered questions most queried by viewers and acted out desired scenes regarding the couple. The episode aired on May 4, 2008, and coincided with Hendrickson and Riegel's new web series Imaginary Bitches. McManus started off the interview asking the actresses how they felt about the writers having Maggie be unfaithful to Bianca. "I was totally upset about it. Are you kidding me?!" Riegel stated. "I was really surprised. But you know...Maggie's been confused, so it's not entirely surprising, but... I was...yeah... Those were hard scenes to do... We were both, like, genuinely upset," she continued. Hendrickson had acknowledged her displeasure with the storyline in an earlier interview, and agreed. She also mentioned Maggie's sexual confusion.

When asked about the emotional impact of Bianca and Maggie's scenes together, how the actresses cry on cue, Riegel cited their close friendship. "It's easy for me to cry around Lizzie because I have real feelings for her," she said. "And I can imagine...'Oh, my god. This person that I love so much doesn't love me back.'" McManus mentioned some viewers thinking of Bianca and Maggie as real, alluding to their questions being addressed more so to the characters rather than the actresses. Riegel and Hendrickson found humor in the topic and agreed as McManus read a letter asking "Maggie" how she felt about her breakup with Bianca. This was followed by a query questioning whether Hendrickson receives hate mail for her character's cheating. "No, I don't get hate mail," said Hendrickson. "Probably, I just never read it. But they just love me so much, they know that I'm not in control of what's written."

Since fans of the pairing often come up with "perfect scenarios" for the couple, Riegel and Hendrickson were asked if they had the opportunity to create their own storyline for the pairing, what would Bianca and Maggie be doing at the moment. Riegel replied, "Well, I think we'd be in bed together," she said. McManus, however, questioned what Maggie and Frankie's parents might have thought about having two lesbian daughters. Hendrickson believed that they would have been proud.

One fan had a series of questions for the actresses, asking: "It's obvious that you two have no issue playing gay or bisexual characters, so what is the biggest obstacle for you guys, obstacles to Bianca and Maggie being a couple in a relationship and seeing the relationship onscreen? And would you ever play gay again?" Riegel and Hendrickson said they would, and Hendrickson said they already "played gay again" earlier in the interview when the two acted out Bianca and Maggie's first meeting. Riegel said, "...Yes, to the second question, but the first question I don't know. It was very complicated."

Hendrickson said her only issue with the role was with the fact that the show would not let them use tongue during Bianca and Maggie's kissing scenes. There was a kissing scene that two of them "got so into", but the directors told them to "cut" and that they were "going to have to do it again because [they] saw tongue". McManus questioned whether heterosexual characters on the series show tongue. Hendrickson said, "Um, try ménage à trois... In the shower. Or a man with a brother and sister... And a sister? God, no. Two brothers and one woman.... We had this lame little kiss, then cut to Kendall and, um, Ryan mauling each other," she said. Riegel agreed with Hendrickson's assessment that the scene "literally" went from their kiss to the more detailed Ryan and Kendall's, and stated that it was as if Ryan was "devouring Kendall's face".

Riegel said of heterosexual couples being given more passionate kisses than her lesbian romances, "...I think they're a couple of reasons. I don't think that you can necessarily say, you know, that they were scared of it...because I think they didn't want to turn people off because they wanted people to invest in the story. And they thought, 'Well, if we go too far...' Like, they were afraid that people who had — who didn't know gay people, and this was very new to them... You know. So I think that was admirable. And I think as we went, we got more into it, and they let us kiss more and there was more whatever..." She cited a "nice kissing scene" between Bianca and Lena Kundera, and said that she remembered thinking why more scenes between gay/lesbian couples could not be like that, where it is "no big deal" and not heavily advertised. Hearing Lena's name brought resentment from Hendrickson, who felt that Lena "stole everything" from Maggie, such as the first lesbian kiss on an American soap opera and Bianca herself. Riegel said, despite this, that Maggie had won Bianca's heart.

Riegel and Hendrickson acknowledged that some fans believe they are gay in real life. "Well, actually, one time I was in this big gay club right over in the area, and all of a sudden, apparently, I was in a serious relationship with a woman," stated Hendrickson. Riegel was unaware of the rumor, and McManus questioned if it was the press that started it. Hendrickson clarified, "No, someone on the Internet was saying, 'Elizabeth was at — and I saw her with a girl...and I was with Ally and we were just hanging out.'" Hendrickson found humor in this, saying that fans consistently speculate that she is gay based on the pictures she takes. She said that they make comments such as "Liz's pictures are always with her girlfriends", "she always has her leg around them", or "she's always, like, sexually with her girlfriends, maybe she's a lesbian". Hendrickson relayed her surprise, saying, "And I was like, I just like to take risque pictures. I'm just really horny. Sorry." Riegel said, "She's not a lesbian. She's just non-discriminating."

Riegel and Hendrickson said their portrayals of gay characters has not harmed their acting careers, and has actually helped Hendrickson in acquiring new roles. The interview was concluded with a scene of Riegel and Hendrickson acting out Bianca and Maggie being reunited. Done for fans dissatisfied with the way the couple's story ended, the scenes included two kisses and other suggestive moments. Earlier in the interview, Riegel stated she liked to think of Bianca and Maggie living together back in Paris.

On September 18, 2008, though fans still hoped for a Bianca and Maggie reunion, Bianca's return to the series without Maggie was reported. Hendrickson currently stars on The Young and the Restless as Chloe Mitchell, and Bianca was given a new female lover named Reese Williams. Riegel returned to the series on October 17, 2008. Tamara Braun was brought on as Reese Williams soon after.

Riegel credited her comeback to her Internet series Imaginary Bitches. She said its All My Children viewers who also watch the web series forced her to establish that Bianca was needed back in Pine Valley. "It was then that I realized how much people wanted to see Bianca back," she said, "how upset they were that Erica had been to prison and Bianca hadn't visited her. And they were angry at me! I was like, 'Wait a minute. I want to go back!'" Riegel felt that the show's writers and producers were not aware of her eagerness to return. So she "called up" Julie Hanan Carruthers, executive producer, and said, "Just so guys know, I would come back anytime, for as long as my schedule would allow. If you guys have an idea, call. I'm always, always here and always eager." When Riegel returned from a trip to Europe, "there was a message from her saying, 'We've got something cooked up for you. Call us back'". Riegel stated that Carruthers "got [her] so excited" about the storyline, and that she was pleased to know she would be working with Braun.

Reese Williams would allow Bianca the type of physical onscreen intimacy she had not had before on the series, and their romance would also include the first same-sex marriage proposal and wedding on an American soap opera. Hendrickson was not excited about the revelation. "[Hendrickson] is very jealous," said Riegel. "I called her up and said, 'Okay, get this!' And she said, 'What? No!' I'd love for Maggie to come back, though, and have a catfight or something!" Riegel forewarned Bianca and Maggie fans that it is a fight Maggie would likely lose. "[Reese and Bianca are] a committed couple. They're in love," she said. Riegel did, however, give Bianca and Maggie fans reason to believe that the two could be romantically reunited. When asked how she felt Bianca and Maggie fans would respond to the Reese and Bianca pairing, she said, "I'm pretty sure BAM fans will never be entirely satisfied until they have their two favorite girls together forever. But Lizzie's [Elizabeth Hendrickson] been so successful on Y&R [as Chloe], and is so obviously happy there, I am hoping they are able to embrace this pairing for the time being." She added, "Hey, at least she's a woman. And maybe sometime down the road the show would be able to entice Lizzie back for a visit to Pine Valley. I do have pull with the little munchkin. I bet I could get her to do it."

After significant criticism directed toward the Reese and Bianca romance, and the feeling that the writers no longer understood Bianca or what she was about, Riegel decided to permanently exit the role in 2010; she joined Hendrickson on The Young and the Restless soon after, as Heather Stevens.

=== Criticism ===
Bianca and Maggie's romance received criticism in addition to praise; there was a part of the audience that saw the romance as detrimental to both characters; they cited that it reinforced the notion that straight women can be "converted" by lesbians, or that lesbians and straight women cannot be friends without sex becoming an issue between them.

The topic of what message All My Children was sending with the storyline was brought into question; whether it was a story about two women in a platonic relationship where one woman within the relationship fights the fact that she is gay and ends up with the woman she romantically desires, or about two women in a platonic relationship where the lesbian in the relationship waits long enough and the straight woman she romantically desires eventually becomes hers. Viewers had a need for the show to tell this controversial storyline responsibly. A significant portion of lesbian viewers, while watching Bianca and Maggie's dilemma, remembered how, in their own lives, they lost friendships, were subjected to acts of violence, and family estrangement because of the false belief that all gay/lesbian people are out to "turn" straight people to "their side" and are malicious in trying.

There were a number of message board postings from people who were scared or angered by the possibility of a Bianca and Maggie romance due to the fact that it caused unpleasant memories to resurface for them in real life. It was addressed that it had not been that long for some gay men and lesbians that "they could walk out of a bar after a night of fun and dancing and not worry about who was watching them leave".

Sentiment was expressed by Laura N. Cook of The Advocate that "despite assurances to the contrary, the show used Bianca's rape to marginalize Bianca's lover, Lena, and completely cut her out of Bianca's healing and recovery, while having Bianca's 'friend', Maggie, ponder her sexuality again, which added insult to injury".

== See also ==
- List of supercouples
