= Leo du Pres and Greenlee Smythe =

Leo and Greenlee
- Josh Duhamel as Leo and Rebecca Budig as Greenlee in August 2011.
- Duration: 1999-2002, 2011
- Introduced by: Jean Dadario Burke
In-universe information
- Other names: Greenleo
- Spouse: 2002

Leo du Pres and Greenlee Smythe du Pres are fictional characters and a supercouple from the American daytime drama All My Children. Leo was portrayed by Josh Duhamel, and Greenlee was portrayed by Rebecca Budig. The couple is often referred to by the portmanteau "Greenleo" (for Greenlee and Leo) on Internet message boards.

The pairing accumulated significant acclaim and media attention during their reign, 1999 to 2002, including two nominations at the Daytime Emmy Awards for America's Favorite Couple. Their loving but antagonistic relationship is regarded as one of the greatest romances in American daytime television.

== Storyline ==
Schemers Leo du Pres and Greenlee Smythe meet when Greenlee is trying to win back college flame Scott Chandler from virgin do-gooder Becca Tyree. Leo wants Becca for himself, so when Greenlee offers him a bet to get Becca into bed, Leo readily takes the challenge. Leo and Greenlee's friendship deepens and as time passes, they learn they have a lot in common. Greenlee eventually moves on to attempting to seduce Ryan Lavery, but gives him up when it becomes obvious that he only loves Gillian Andrassy. Greenlee develops a relationship with Leo. The two fool around, but neither think about becoming a serious couple.

Greenlee's trouble with a criminal named Wade turns dangerous. Wade somehow manages to escape jail and goes after Greenlee for turning him in to the cops. He holds Greenlee at gunpoint and demands that she get him a sizable chunk of cash and a passport out of the country. Greenlee tries her best to get Leo out of the way by telling him that she does not care about him and wants nothing more to do with him. Nevertheless, Leo continues hanging around and almost gets shot in the process. Wade later corners Greenlee and holds her hostage for $1,000,000 in ransom. Woodruff agrees to drop off the money at the boathouse (a placed where Pine Valley residents go for peace) in order to win his granddaughter's freedom. Leo happens upon the scene and tries to muscle Wade into submission. He fails and Wade locks Leo and Greenlee in a faulty elevator. Leo helps Greenlee escape the elevator before its cable snaps; Leo is not as lucky, though he does manage to escape before the elevator totally bottoms out.

Afterward, Leo and Greenlee are closer than ever. Leo takes Greenlee to the tropics to toast to their new relationship. Greenlee is unaware that Leo is using her grandfather's ransom money to fund the getaway. When Greenlee learns the truth, she and Leo return to Pine Valley and Leo is subsequently arrested for theft. Greenlee asks her grandfather to have the charges against Leo dropped. Woodruff says that he will only talk to Leo. Woodruff visits Leo in his jail cell and tells him that he will drop the charges against him if he agrees to take the rest of the ransom money and fly to Europe — and never see Greenlee again. Leo refuses and wins Woodruff's respect in the process. Greenlee, however, thinks that Leo has accepted the offer and severs her ties to Leo. She later learns from her grandfather that Leo has not accepted the offer, but by then Leo is furious with Greenlee and is questioning whether or not he really wants her in his life.

Leo and Greenlee find themselves growing more and more fond of each other. Eventually, Leo and Greenlee's attraction turns to love. In the later winter of 2001, Greenlee asks Leo to marry her. Leo fears accepting her proposal because Roger Smythe, Greenlee's father, learned why he originally came to Pine Valley — to swindle Greenlee out of her fortune. As it turns out, Leo developed true feelings for Greenlee and no longer wants her money. He has a prenuptial agreement drawn up that will prevent him from seeing even one cent of Greenlee's money after a split. Roger catches wind of the agreement and flies in a woman from Verona, Italy named Katerina di Courcey. During his days as a con, Leo had taken Katerina for everything she had. Katerina lies and says that Leo asked her for a prenup too. She makes up the story to ruin Leo's happiness, the same way that he ruined hers when he stole her money. Greenlee and Leo promptly split, though it is clear that they both love each other.

In spring, a frantic Brooke English begs Leo to pretend to be interested in her dying daughter, Laura, so that this will spur Laura to fight for her life. Leo initially refuses, but over time he and Laura grow closer. It is suspect if Leo truly loves Laura, but also clear that he does care for her and wants to see her recover fully. On June 18, Leo pops the question to a hospitalized Laura and she accepts. Just two days later, the pair marry in Laura's hospital room with Brooke, Bianca Montgomery, David Hayward (Leo's half-brother), and nurse Zora in attendance. However, in spite of her happiness, Laura's health continues to deteriorate rapidly and the only possible way to save her life is with a heart transplant. In the nick of time, Leo learns that Gillian has been shot in the head and manages to convince her grieving husband, Ryan, to donate her heart to Laura. Laura rapidly recovers, but is quite needy and Leo almost immediately realizes that as much as he wants to, he does not love her. Leo is in love with Greenlee, and cannot even fathom making love to his wife.

Even though he is married to Laura, Greenlee is determined to win back Leo. When Laura recovers from her transplant, Leo finds himself trapped in a loveless marriage. Greenlee seizes her opportunity and is tossed in jail after violating a restraining order to steer clear of the married couple.

Greenlee eventually gives up on Leo, as he is determined to keep Laura happy in his sham of a marriage. Greenlee subsequently moves in with Jake Martin and the two become very close.

Laura eventually begins to go insane, plotting against Greenlee and ultimately guilts Leo into a "proper" ceremony, where Leo comes to his senses and turns Laura down. As he gives her back his ring, Greenlee, who was trapped by Laura in an air duct, sets off the sprinkler system in an attempt to get help. The entire wedding party ducks for cover except for Leo, who feels cleansed of Laura and is ready to win Greenlee back.

Once Leo leaves Laura, Greenlee becomes torn between Jake and Leo. Neither man wants to be "the other man." Leo proposes to Greenlee and she accepts, but the engagement is later broken when Leo tries to give her the ring in front of Jake and Laura, which Greenlee takes as an attempt to show up Jake. The two quickly get back together however, but the happiness is short-lived. Greenlee ends up trapped on an island with Jake after she is drugged and left for dead on a sinking boat by Leo's mother, Vanessa Cortlandt, who sets it up to make Leo think Greenlee has left him for Jake. Greenlee and an also-drugged Jake escaped their near-watery grave, but Greenlee's unwillingness to commit to Jake results in Jake walking away and Leo and Greenlee happily reunite.

Leo spends most of 2002 coping with his bizarre and criminal family. First comes Vanessa kidnapping and nearly killing Greenlee, and the reveal that Vanessa has long been Proteus, head of an international drug cartel. Leo begins to wonder about the drug money she has stashed away somewhere, seeing the cash as a way for him and Greenlee to eventually move to their favorite city, Paris. Vanessa develops a split personality, is admitted to the hospital as a psych patient, and Leo is drawn into her needs in spite of his better judgment. He also distrusts her new lawyer, Trey Kenyon, and with good reason, as Trey is plotting against him and Vanessa, both out of revenge and to get his hands on the Proteus money. Unknown to everyone, Trey is Leo's long-lost half-brother, and wants revenge for what he feels was abandonment by his family.

As Greenlee tries to deal with Leo's need to stay in Vanessa's life and the constant revolving door of his new-found relatives (cousins Frankie and Maggie Stone), she and Leo finally manage to marry in the summer. Even this is marred, due to former associates of Vanessa's (who also want the drug money) crashing the wedding with her in tow. Greenlee's father, Roger Smythe, who continues to worm his way back into her life, even after disappointing her countless times, is shot by drug operatives. A few hours before he dies, he accidentally lets it slip to Greenlee that he was sleeping with her bridesmaid and close friend, Simone Torres. After he dies, Greenlee's pain is intensified when she overhears her grandfather telling her mother, Mary Smythe, who has come back into her life claiming to want a reconciliation, that he knows she is only interested in Greenlee because she wants to be put back into his will. Greenlee's dependency on Leo magnifies and they go off on a brief honeymoon. Their happiness is not to last.

When they return to town, the couple becomes embroiled with Trey and Kendall Hart, both of whom Greenlee despises, in a quest to track down the missing Proteus drug money. The paper trail ends in worthless stocks, and with Vanessa being shipped off to a federal location, Greenlee seizes the opportunity to convince Leo to move to Paris with her. However, Vanessa goes into a coma, "dies" for a few seconds, and comes back to life as the calm, sweet mother Leo never had, calling herself Nessa. Leo feels close to her for the first time. He discovers that he has another long-lost relative — Trey is actually his older brother, Ben Shepherd. Trey assumed his dead best friend's identity and dedicated his life to wreaking havoc on the mother who had abandoned him at birth. Leo, also a lost soul, quickly accepts Trey and forgives the many misdeeds Trey had perpetrated on him in the past months. Working with Greenlee and Kendall, they find the Proteus "stash", which are worthless stocks. They think that the trail has finally reached a dead end, and can only laugh.

Even though Vanessa has supposedly given way to a kinder, gentler split personality, Greenlee does not trust her for a second. In truth, "Nessa", who is now in federal custody, has reverted to being Vanessa, and knows that the real treasure happens to be a fortune in diamonds. Greenlee is increasingly frightened by Nessa and never believes for a second that she is kind or sweet. She demands that Leo finally give up his "loser" family for good, and he agrees. But moments before their flight to Paris, he receives a call from David, whom he had been helping out after his latest arrest and imprisonment. Unfortunately, while he was absent, Vanessa kidnapped Greenlee. She took her to Miller's Falls. Vanessa informs Leo that he has to find and give her the diamonds before she will release Greenlee. In a panic, Leo finds the jewels and races to the falls with Trey. When Vanessa refuses to release her, Leo begins dropping the priceless gems over the falls, one by one. Vanessa agrees to do as he wishes, but actually plans to kill her hated enemy. Leo drops more diamonds into the falls, freaking out Vanessa. When Vanessa threatens to shoot Leo for dropping her diamonds, Greenlee fights with Vanessa for the gun but is knocked off the edge, falling onto a ledge 20 feet below. Leo thinks Greenlee is dead and in retaliation, throws the rest of the diamonds over the falls. Vanessa screams angrily at her loss, and in return calls Leo a fool for throwing away their future. Leo and Vanessa then have a very bad argument, which eventually led him to strangle her for pushing Greenlee over the edge. Leo's strangle caused Vanessa to fire the gun, waking up Greenlee. Reaching her breaking point, Vanessa was forced to aim the gun at Leo's head while gasping for air, threatening him not to make her kill him. All of a sudden, Greenlee's call gives Leo hope. Leo lets go of Vanessa's neck and he starts to climb down to her. When Vanessa realizes Greenlee survived the fall, she begins shooting at her. Leo attacks Vanessa and they had a bad fight for control of the gun. Unfortunately their combined weight during the fight for the gun breaks the railing and Leo and Vanessa fall 100 feet into the falls. His body is never recovered and neither was Vanessa's. His beloved "Greens" and his family, who saw him as their moral center, are devastated. As much as they try to move on with their lives, they feel an inescapable ache. Greenlee lost her soul mate and one true love. Pine Valley and Greenlee would never quite be the same without him.

On August 4, 2011, Leo and Greenlee briefly reunited for the first time in 9 years. On August 5, they share a kiss which causes Greenlee to wake to find that in Leo's place is Zach.

Greenlee was brought back by The Orpheus Project.

== Impact ==
Leo and Greenlee were acclaimed among All My Children viewers and soap opera television critics, and were dubbed "GreenLeo." In 2000, the pairing were named "Best New Couple" by magazine Soap Opera Digest, and in 2001, as well as 2002, were nominated for the Daytime Emmy fan award America's Favorite Couple. The couple were a top contender in NBC's 2002 Soap Chat Viewers Choice Awards Cyber-Ceremony, and in 2003, the duo's part in a young Bianca Montgomery "coming out" as gay was documented in C. Lee Harrington's book Homosexuality on All My Children: transforming the daytime landscape. In 2000, Soap Opera Digest stated:

The best romances are born of the most unlikely circumstances. That’s the case with wicked cynics Leo and Greenlee, pals who schemed to win Becca and Ryan before coming to their senses and the conclusion that they belong with each other. With their sizzling chemistry and sparkling wit, this unorthodox duo brightens even the dullest of scenes. Take the one where Greens crashed a Halloween bash dressed as a harem girl and flirted with Leo at the punch bowl: 'Could you pour a cup for me? I’ve traveled so long and so far. I need some refreshment so I can dance with you, Oh noble master,' she purred. 'You’re going to have to rock somebody else’s casbah; I’ve got a date,' was his wry response. Rather than telling us that the pair is in love, AMC shows us with lots of scenes with playful romance like that bubble bath or the tender moment when Leo gave Greens a puppy. Add undeniable heat between Rebecca Budig and Josh Duhamel, two of AMC’s most riveting performers, and you’ve got a winning team.

In 2007, Soaps In Depth listed the pairing among the ten perfect couples for the magazine's tenth anniversary issue. Originally, the couple were considered as being "on the verge of" supercouple status, but in February 2009, soap opera columnist Carolyn Aspenson stated that Leo and Greenlee were a "supercouple redefined". She argued that tragic couples such as Leo and Greenlee are a better love story than if they had stayed together with a "boring" everyday life. "They loved, they lost. Their love ‘ended’ tragically but the love itself didn’t die. The death of Leo saddened and frustrated the fans but left them with the thought that these two were meant to be together," she said. In 2011, with the return of Josh Duhamel as Leo, the pairing were also referred to as a supercouple by Entertainment Weekly's Lynette Rice.

== See also ==
- List of supercouples
