= Elizabeth Hendrickson =

American actress (born 1979)

- Born: Elizabeth Hendrickson; July 3, 1979 (age 47); New York City, New York, U.S.
- Occupation: Actress
- Years active: 2001–present
- Spouse: Rob Meder (m. 2019)
- Children: 1

Elizabeth Hendrickson (born July 3, 1979) is an American actress. Her big break came when she was cast as character Frankie Stone on the daytime drama All My Children. Her equally popular role of Maggie Stone, the character's identical twin, launched the character into iconic status as one half of supercouple Bianca Montgomery and Maggie Stone.

Following her departure from All My Children, Hendrickson guest starred in several primetime shows. Since 2008, she starred as fashion vixen Chloe Mitchell on The Young and the Restless.

== Early life ==
Hendrickson was born in New York City. Her family later moved to Northport, Long Island, and maintained a home there. At an early age, Hendrickson showed an interest in the performing arts. "Artistic people have always surrounded me," she stated in a Q&A interview, citing her actor/artist family as her inspiration for wanting to become an actress. "Their talent and love for the arts continue to inspire me and always will." Her cousin is documentary filmmaker Dennis Michael Lynch. By the age of 5, Hendrickson was tap dancing on tabletops at family weddings. As she aged, her love for performing deepened.

My first play was in fourth grade, Johnny Appleseed. By the time I was in sixth grade, I knew that I wanted to be an actress. My dream has always been to be on Broadway. In eighth grade, I was one of the six finalists for New York for The Mickey Mouse Club. But I goofed on my screen test. It was my first professional audition. I heard the advertisement on the radio and I dragged my mother there. My favorite performance was my role in The Music Man my senior year in High School. I played Minnie. I had so much fun playing the little pipsqueak, it was so me!

Hendrickson studied musical theatre at Syracuse University for two years before returning to New York. She transferred to Fordham College in her sophomore year.

She auditioned for the roles of Bianca Montgomery, Rain Wilkins and Pine Valley High cheerleader Mindy on the daytime drama All My Children, but others were cast in the parts. She tried out as Guiding Light character Michelle Bauer Santos, a role that eventually went to actress Rebecca Budig.

== Career ==
=== All My Children ===
In 2001, when All My Children head writer Richard Culliton wanted to set up a murder storyline, he created character Mary Frances Stone (referred to onscreen as "Frankie"). Hendrickson was cast in the part. Her character was set to be the lesbian girlfriend of Bianca Montgomery (Eden Riegel) and be killed in 3 months. It was deemed unlikely that a homosexual pairing on a soap opera would be successful, but fan reaction to the Bianca and Frankie pairing was unprecedented. Unfortunately, the Culliton murder storyline could not be rewritten, so Frankie was killed and Bianca's mother, Erica Kane (Susan Lucci), was seen standing over her corpse holding a gun.

This prompted uproar in the soap opera community, and producers quickly thought up a way to bring the actress back to the show. Rather than rewrite Frankie's murder, the writers created her identical twin sister, Mary Margaret Stone (better known as Maggie), in 2002. Maggie quickly became instrumental in solving her sister's murder.

Storyline tension was created when it was revealed that unlike Frankie, character Maggie was not gay. This, however, did not stop Bianca and Maggie (fondly referred to in soap circles as BAM) fans from becoming very vocal about their support for the couple. After several heterosexual pairings involving Maggie did not work on the show, the writers began to develop a deepening relationship between the two characters. Eventually, Maggie kissed Bianca, moments before Bianca's lover, Lena Kundera (Olga Sosnovska), walked in.

Bianca and Maggie became one of the most demanded couples in soap opera history. Hendrickson subsequently gained a loyal lesbian following. In 2006, Lesbianation.com, self-proclaimed as the leading online community for lesbians, voted her on their top ten list of Women We Love. The following year, Hendrickson again made the list.

Hendrickson portrayed the popular role of Maggie until February 2005. Onscreen, Maggie exited Pine Valley with Bianca, traveling with her and her daughter, Miranda, to live in Paris. In late 2005, during Bianca's visit to Pine Valley, it was revealed that Maggie and Bianca had become lovers offscreen. In real life, Hendrickson and former castmate Eden Riegel have since separately moved to Los Angeles, and are pursuing other acting ventures. Riegel, however, did return to All My Children for a year, as part of a major storyline in late 2006, early 2007. Hendrickson returned again in January 2007 for a short 3-week stint. Her last airdate was February 7, 2007 when her character returned to Paris.

=== Other roles ===
Since leaving All My Children, Hendrickson has earned guest starring roles in the television shows Medium, Cold Case, CSI: Miami and an uncredited role in Criminal Minds. She was to guest star on an episode of Criminal Minds titled Doubt on April 25, 2007, in the role of Katie, but the episode was pulled in deference to the tragedy at Virginia Tech and similar subject matter. The episode became the Season 3 premiere instead.

Hendrickson signed on to play the role of Chloe Mitchell, a fashionista who stirs up trouble on the daytime drama The Young and the Restless in early 2008. It was revealed on the August 29, 2008 episode that the character was actually Kate, daughter of Katherine Chancellor's maid, Esther Valentine. Hendrickson exited the program in May 2014, but made guest appearances in October 2014 and October 2015. In May 2016 it was announced that Hendrickson would be returning to The Young and the Restless. She appeared from July 2016 to July 2017. She returned again in June 2019, and has remained on the series on a recurring status. In June 2023, Henderson announced on Instagram that she was no longer under contract.

Hendrickson has starred in the web series Imaginary Bitches with Riegel. In May 2018, it was announced that Hendrickson had joined the cast of General Hospital as Margaux Dawson. However, she left the show the following year in order to return to her role on The Young and the Restless.

== Personal life ==
Hendrickson married Rob Meder on June 29, 2019, after becoming engaged in December 2018. The couple have one daughter, born on March 27, 2020. Hendrickson's pregnancy was written into her character's storyline on The Young and the Restless.

== Filmography ==
Year	Title	Role	Notes
Film
2005	Searching for Bobby D	Denise	TV movie
2006	That Guy	411 Partygoer	Comedic short
Television
2001	Law & Order: Special Victims Unit	Mandy Schumacher	Episode: "Consent"
2006	Medium	Mindy	Episode: "Method to His Madness"
2006	Cold Case	Emma Elizabeth Vine - 1968	Episode: "Debut"
2006	CSI: Miami	Rebecca Roth	Episode: "Going, Going, Gone"
2001–05, 2007	All My Children	Mary Frances "Frankie" Stone / Mary Margaret "Maggie" Stone	Contract roles
2006–07	Criminal Minds	Amy Cole / Katie	Episodes: "P911" & "Doubt"
2008–17; 2019–present	The Young and the Restless	Chloe Mitchell	Contract role; February 6, 2008 – May 27, 2014; guest star: October 14, 2014 and October 12-October 14, 2015
2015	NCIS: New Orleans	Beth	
2015	Major Crimes	Sarah	
2018–19	General Hospital	Margaux Dawson	Contract role; May 29, 2018 – June 18, 2019
Other work
unknown	Tide	Young wife	TV commercial
2009	McDonald's	Girlfriend	TV commercial
2009	Special K:	Scary Girl	TV commercial
2009	Bud Light: Language of Love	Hot girl	TV commercial
2009	Ford Fusion: Ice	Girlfriend	TV commercial
2009	Imaginary Bitches	Lizzie	Web series

== Awards and nominations ==
List of acting awards and nominations
Year	Award	Category	Title	Result	Ref.
2009	Daytime Emmy Award	Outstanding New Approaches - (Daytime Entertainment)	Imaginary Bitches	Nominated	
2012	Daytime Emmy Award	Outstanding Supporting Actress in a Drama Series	The Young and the Restless	Nominated	
2014	Daytime Emmy Award	Outstanding Supporting Actress in a Drama Series	The Young and the Restless	Nominated	
2015	Daytime Emmy Award	Outstanding Supporting Actress in a Drama Series	The Young and the Restless	Nominated	
2018	Daytime Emmy Award	Outstanding Supporting Actress in a Drama Series	The Young and the Restless	Nominated	
