= Bomb Patrol Afghanistan =

American documentary television series

- Genre: Documentary series
- Starring: Chase Holzhauer; Brad Penley; Jeremy Stein; Matt Rayl; Brendan Schmutte; John Groat; Sam Durham; Ricky Thibeault
- Narrated by: Josh Duhamel
- Country of origin: United States
- Original language: English
- No. of seasons: 1
- No. of episodes: 17

Production
- Production location: Afghanistan
- Running time: 42 minutes
- Production company: Big Fish Entertainment

Original release
- Network: G4
- Release: October 25, 2011 – May 1, 2012

Bomb Patrol Afghanistan is an American documentary television series that premiered in the United States on G4 in October 2011. The series follows members of a United States Navy EOD (Explosive Ordnance Disposal) unit (Platoon 3-4-2) as they hunt for and dismantle explosives in Afghanistan. Bomb Patrol Afghanistan began the second half of its first season on March 27, 2012 consisting of deleted scenes, behind the scenes and best of specials. Josh Duhamel hosted a special "sit down" episode with four members of the original cast in the G4 studios. Duhamel refused to sit down during the special, and decided to stand for the whole taping out of respect for the lives lost during the 17 episode run.

== The team ==
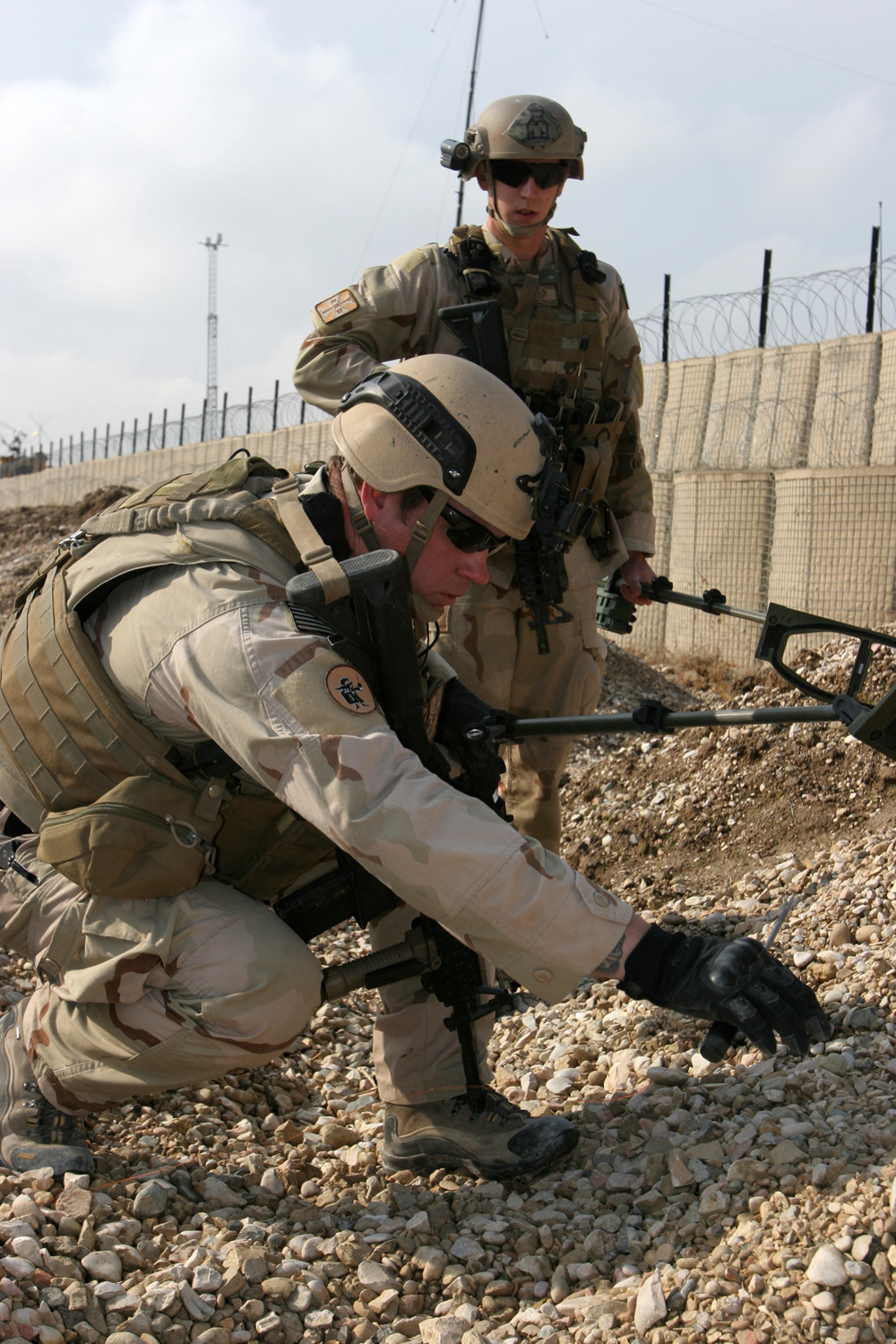
Members of the Navy EOD 3 team perform a training exercise in Maimanah, Afghanistan

The team consisted of:

- Lieutenant Junior Grade (LTJG) Brad Penley
- Chief Petty Officer John Groat
- Petty Officer 1st Class Ricky Thibeault
- Petty Officer 1st Class Jeremy Stein
- Petty Officer 2nd Class Brendan Schmutte
- Petty Officer 3rd Class Matt Rayl
- Petty Officer 3rd Class Chase Holzhauer
- Petty Officer 3rd Class Sam Durham

== Episodes ==
No.	Title	Original release date
1	"Rules of Engagement"	October 25, 2011
2	"The Road of Blood"	November 1, 2011
3	"The Triggerman"	November 8, 2011
4	"Live Charge"	November 15, 2011
5	"For Sgt. Kirspel"	November 22, 2011
6	"Suicide Vest"	November 29, 2011
7	"Thanksgiving"	December 6, 2011
8	"Teamwork"	December 13, 2011
9	"Ambush"	December 20, 2011
10	"The Firefight"	December 27, 2011
11	"Donkeys"	March 27, 2012
12	"Route X Part One"	April 3, 2012
13	"Route X Part Two"	April 10, 2012
14	"Best of Bomb Patrol"	April 17, 2012
15	"Weapons Tech"	April 24, 2012
16	"Behind the Scenes"	May 1, 2012
17	"Reunion"	May 1, 2012

== International broadcast ==
- United Kingdom – From March 11, 2013 on Channel 5. The title has been changed to just Bomb Patrol and the first episode name has been renamed to The Rules of Engagement and the second Road of Blood.
- Czech Republic – From April 30, 2013 on Prima Cool under name Pyrotechnická hlídka: Afghánistán (Pyrotechnic Patrol: Afghanistan)
