= Buddy Games: Spring Awakening =

- Theatrical release poster
- Directed by: Josh Duhamel
- Written by: Gabriel McKinley; Rachael Thoele
- Produced by: Josh Duhamel
- Starring: Dan Bakkedahl; Kevin Dillon; Josh Duhamel; Nick Swardson
- Cinematography: Tristan Sachar; Shawn Seifert
- Edited by: Diana Fishman
- Music by: Rob Lord
- Production companies: The Long Game; Dakotakid Productions
- Distributed by: Paramount Pictures
- Release date: May 19, 2023
- Running time: 91 minutes
- Country: United States
- Language: English

Buddy Games: Spring Awakening is a 2023 American comedy film directed by Josh Duhamel, starring Duhamel, Dan Bakkedahl, Kevin Dillon, Duhamel and Nick Swardson. It is the sequel to the 2019 film Buddy Games.

== Plot ==
Set some time after the events of the first film, Murphy John Durfy, Jr. has died, and his friends, Bobfather, Bender, Doc and Zane attend his funeral. Durfy's brother, Jack, prepares to take Durfy's ashes to the family business, where he intends to scatter them. However, Bobfather, wanting to scatter the ashes in a place that is more sentimental to their friendship, steals the urn and plays a game of keep away with it. They flee the church with the urn and escape in a helicopter with their friend Shelly, but Jack and his uncle Tommy pursue and attack Zane on foot. The guys resolve to scatter the ashes at the lake where they first invented the Buddy Games.

The guys arrive at Party Marty's, the bar they invented the games at and are banned from for life. The guys are shocked to see that the owner, Marty, has stolen their idea and has been doing it ever since. The guys participate in the Buddy Games to regain their crown, only to be beaten by some underhanded tactics by an opposing team. Although they lose the games, they earn the respect of Marty, who buries the hatchet with the guys. Marty informs the guys that a former waitress, Celia, fell in love with Durfy and quit after he went back home. The guys decide to scatter the ashes with her, and resolve to go to her home in nearby Backwater the next day. Marty informs the guys that there are no vacancies in the area because of spring break.

However, they are approached by a mysterious new age woman named Phoenix, who invites them to her rave and offers to make sure they have a place to sleep. With no other options, the guys go to Phoenix's rave where they are given a warm welcome, but their old-fashioned ways clash with the new, "woke" attitudes of the younger party attendees. Thinking they are Shiitakes, Doc eats ten Psilocybin mushrooms by mistake. Not wanting their friend to have a trip alone, all of the guys take various recreational drugs and become extremely high. After a night of hardcore partying, the guys become separated and pass out.

The next morning, the guys realize that their group has split into two. Bobfather and Bender wake up in a spare room in Phoenix's house and realize that she runs a cult and intends to indoctrinate them into her philosophy. Doc and Shelly wake up in a brothel and Doc realizes that he had sex with a prostitute the previous night. Doc and Shelly are unable to get ahold of the other two, so they decide to start walking towards Backwater, followed by a chicken Doc names "Henrietta". Back at the cult, Phoenix tells Bobfather and Bender that the purpose of her re-education camp is to take the rejects of society and incoctrinate them. She specifically targets "alpha males" in hopes of giving them an awareness of social inequalities.

Phoenix puts the two into her own version of the Buddy Games, a series of escape rooms that educate the participants on leftist social ideology. The guys reluctantly pass all the tests, only for Phoenix to force Bobfather to play an "adult game", Russian Roulette with a loaded revolver. Bobfather refuses to play and drops the gun, only for the weapon to discharge and shoot off Phoenix's toe. While Phoenix and her cult members all panic and search for the missing toe, her second-in-command, Beta, gives the guys Durfy's ashes and lets them leave, having come to respect their traditional masculinity. Meanwhile, having tortured Zane in a tanning bed, Jack gets their location and heads after them.

Bobfather and Bender take two bicycles and ride to Backwater, where they get directions to Celia's house and see that Shelly and Doc have also made it there after a ten-mile walk that involved having to eat a skunk. Celia reveals that she became pregnant by Durfy and now has an adult daughter, Jennifer, who strongly resembles her father. Jack is shocked and realizes that the ashes belong with Celia and Jennifer until they can all get together again and scatter them together. However, Bobfather's helicopter arrives, causing Jack to drop the urn and scattering the ashes anyway. Having bonded over the chaotic experience, the friends all reunite and leave in the helicopter.

== Cast ==
- Josh Duhamel as Bobfather
- Nick Swardson as Bender
- Kevin Dillon as Doc
- Dan Bakkedahl as Shelly
- James Roday Rodriguez as Zane Rockwell
- Jensen Ackles as Jack Durfy
- Carmel Amit as Phoenix
- Ginnifer Goodwin as Celia
- Savannah Miller as Jennifer
- Garry Chalk as Marty
- Lochlyn Munro as Uncle Tommy
- Nathan Kay as Beta
- Dylan Playfair as Larry Lampshade
- Dax Shepard as Murphy John Durfy, Jr. (photo only)

== Production ==
Like the first film, Buddy Games: Spring Awakening was shot in Vancouver, British Columbia, Canada. Josh Duhamel said that they chose to kill Dax Shepard's character because he was too busy to come back, explaining: "It was a get to get him the first time around, and I knew that he’s been so busy that there wasn’t a chance I was going to get him to come back for the second one. So I just told him ‘Listen bro, we just can’t pretend you’re not there, we’ve got to do something, so I’m going to kill you off.’ He was like, ‘Alright, that’s fine.’ Dax is one of my very good friends and I would have loved to have him, but he’s just been — you know, with the podcast and everything else he does out in the desert with the dune buggies — the guy just isn’t available. So we had to come up with a story around it, and I think that it was actually kind of a blessing, because we needed a way into this one, and as somber as the movie starts, it gives us that base that you need. This movie, with all the shenanigans that happen, it does ultimately have to be about friendship, and brotherhood, and how do you celebrate a fallen brother’s life? That’s kind of what the whole driving force behind the movie is. As a guy who has very close friends, this is the kind of thing that we’d go do. I mean, not at spring break, but we would take his ashes and go spread them and celebrate him."

== Release ==
The film was released in select theaters on May 19, 2023. It was also released on digital on June 2, 2023.

== Reception ==
The film has a 33% rating on Rotten Tomatoes based on six reviews. Peter Sobczynski of RogerEbert.com gave the film a "thumbs down."
