= Buddy Games =

2019 American comedy film

- Film poster
- Directed by: Josh Duhamel
- Written by: Josh Duhamel; Bob Schwartz; Jude Weng
- Produced by: Josh Duhamel; Michael J. Luisi; Jude Weng
- Starring: Josh Duhamel; Dax Shepard; Kevin Dillon; Olivia Munn; Dan Bakkedahl; James Roday Rodriguez; Nick Swardson
- Cinematography: Luke Bryant
- Edited by: Kenneth Marsten
- Music by: Alex Wurman
- Production companies: WWE Studios; Dakotakid Productions; The Long Game
- Distributed by: Saban Films
- Release dates: February 10, 2019 (Mammoth Film Festival); November 24, 2020 (United States)
- Running time: 90 minutes
- Country: United States
- Language: English
- Box office: $852,378

Buddy Games is a 2019 American comedy film directed by Josh Duhamel in his solo directorial debut and written by Duhamel, Bob Schwartz, and Jude Weng. Produced by Duhamel, Michael J. Luisi, and Weng, the film centers on a group of six friends that reunite after a five-year hiatus to engage in a challenging set of dares and games and help lift one of their own out of depression and also have a chance of winning $150,000 while doing so. The cast includes Duhamel, Dax Shepard, Olivia Munn, Kevin Dillon, and Neal McDonough.

The project was originally announced in June 2017 as a deal with WWE Studios, with the cast joining shortly thereafter and filming commencing two months later in Vancouver. The film held its world premiere at the 2019 Mammoth Film Festival and Saban Films acquired distribution rights for the United States in July 2020. The film received mostly negative reviews from critics, with most criticism directed at the plot, humor, direction, and characters.

In 2023, a sequel to the film was released with most of the cast reprising their role. That same year, a CBS game show spin-off and featuring Duhamel as the host was also released.

== Plot ==
Shelly, a six-time winner of the annual Buddy Games, defeats Bender in the most recent edition. During a drunken celebration, Shelly humiliates a passed-out friend. In response, Bender and Nikki, Shelly's wife, jokingly threaten revenge. Nikki ultimately shoots Shelly in the groin, causing the loss of both his testicles. Bender takes the blame to protect Shelly's marriage and as subtle retaliation for Shelly's behavior.

Five years later, Shelly is suicidal, divorced, and living with his mother. His mother contacts Bob, a wealthy friend, urging him to restart the Buddy Games to give Shelly a sense of purpose. Shelly agrees to participate under the conditions that Bender not be invited and his medical condition remain secret. Bob agrees.

Bob invites all the friends except Bender. Bender learns of the event and confronts Bob, who lies about a $10,000 entry fee. Bender sells his mother's belongings and performs degrading acts to pay. Upon arrival, Bender publicly reveals Shelly's condition and offers vials of his sperm. Bob admits Bender was never invited. Bender pressures Bob into adding a $100,000 cash prize, which Shelly agrees to.

The competition includes various physical and comedic challenges. Shelly, Bob, and Bender reach the final round. The night before, Shelly spikes the group's drinks with Bender's semen. Bender is later kidnapped and restrained by Shelly, who destroys his van in retaliation. Bender reveals Nikki was the one who pulled the trigger.

In the final round, the three compete in an archery-based hunt. Bob is eliminated first. Bender defeats Shelly in hand-to-hand combat and wins the prize. Bob's girlfriend, Tiffany, proposes to him, suggesting he move on from the group. When Bob refuses, she physically assaults the group and leaves.

In the credits, Zane comes out as gay, Durfy lands a TV role, and Bender gifts Shelly artificial testicles using part of the prize money.

== Cast ==
- Josh Duhamel as Bobfather
- Olivia Munn as Tiffany
- James Roday Rodriguez as Zane Rockwell
- Kevin Dillon as Doc
- Dan Bakkedahl as Shelly
- Sheamus as Thursty
- Dax Shepard as Durfy
- Nick Swardson as Bender
- Neal McDonough as himself
- Jensen Ackles as Jack Durfy (cameo role)

== Production ==
The film was directed by Josh Duhamel in his directorial debut and co-written by Duhamel, Bob Schwartz, and Jude Weng. Filming began in August 2017 in Vancouver.

The casting of Sheamus and Nick Swardson was announced in June 2017, with Kevin Dillon, Dax Shepard, Olivia Munn, James Roday Rodriguez, and Dan Bakkedahl joining two months later.

== Release ==
Buddy Games had its world premiere on February 10, 2019, at the Mammoth Film Festival in California. In July 2020, Saban Films acquired distribution rights for the United States. The film was released digitally and through video on demand on November 24, 2020.

== Reception ==
Buddy Games received largely negative reviews from critics.

On Rotten Tomatoes, the film holds an approval rating of 16% based on 25 reviews, with an average rating of 3.9/10. On Metacritic, it has a weighted average score of 22 out of 100, based on 6 critic reviews, indicating "generally unfavorable reviews".

Cath Clarke of The Guardian rated the film 1 out of 5 stars, describing it as "a buddy gross-out movie that's unfunny and offensive in equal measures." Richard Roeper of The Chicago Sun-Times gave it 1 out of 4 stars, writing that its "middle-aged, self-absorbed clowns are so repugnant and uninteresting and small-minded and awful, they make the gang from Tag look like the Knights of the Round Table," and called it "a legit contender for worst movie of 2020."

Johnny Oleksinski of the New York Post awarded the film zero stars, criticizing its lack of character development and depiction of toxic masculinity, concluding that "Buddy Games leaves you feeling dead inside." Frank Scheck of The Hollywood Reporter described the film as a "paean to arrested male adolescence", noting that it favors excessive gags over genuine comedy. However, he acknowledged Dan Bakkedahl's performance as "undeniably vanity-free" and "no-holds-barred."

In a more positive review, Mick LaSalle of The San Francisco Chronicle wrote that the film "has a wicked sense of comedy that occasionally is quite funny," but criticized the narrative shift once the games begin, calling it "mere spectacle." He also found the protagonist's preference for his friends over his wife implausible, noting that Olivia Munn, despite limited screen time, remains "the best thing in every movie she's in."

== Franchise ==
In April 2023, CBS announced that it had ordered a reality competition series inspired by the film, produced by Bunim/Murray Productions, Dakota Kid Productions and CBS Studios with Duhamel as host and executive producer. The series premiered on September 14, 2023.

A sequel, Buddy Games: Spring Awakening, was released on May 19, 2023, with most of the cast returning.
