= Buddy Games (TV series) =

American reality competition show

- Genre: Game show
- Created by: Josh Duhamel; Bob Schwartz; Jude Weng
- Presented by: Josh Duhamel
- Country of origin: United States
- Original language: English
- No. of seasons: 1
- No. of episodes: 8

Production
- Executive producers: Josh Duhamel; Michael J. Luisi; Julie Pizzi; Rupert Dobson; Jacob Lane; Emer Harkin
- Production location: Bogotá, Colombia
- Production companies: Dakota Kid Productions; The Long Game Productions; Bunim/Murray Productions; CBS Studios

Original release
- Network: CBS
- Release: September 14 – November 2, 2023

Buddy Games is an American reality competition television series that aired on CBS from September 14 to November 2, 2023. The series is hosted by Josh Duhamel, who starred in the film of the same name on which the show is based.

== Format ==
Six teams of four people each compete in several competitions. The winner of the first competition gets to pick another team to sabotage in the second competition. The two teams who lose the second competition face off against each other in a third challenge, and whichever team loses that must choose one of their members to be eliminated from the game. They can also choose to eliminate themselves. If a team falls below three members, they are eliminated from the competition.

== Contestants ==
Competitor	Hometown	Status	Ref.
Derby Squad
Melissa Berglund	Los Angeles, California	Lost on October 19, 2023	
Rachel Johnston	Los Angeles, California	Voted out on October 12, 2023	
Shengul "Shaggy" Plummer	Los Angeles, California	Lost on October 19, 2023	
Jacky "Shu" Shu	Los Angeles, California	Lost on October 19, 2023	
Chicago's Finest
Melvin "Rae" Davis	Chicago, Illinois	Runner-up on November 2, 2023	
David "Sarge" Moore	Chicago, Illinois	Runner-up on November 2, 2023	
Elyse Rodriguez	Chicago, Illinois	Runner-up on November 2, 2023	
Ikeila "Kei" Smart	Chicago, Illinois	Runner-up on November 2, 2023	
Team PRIDE
Steven Mosier	Portland, Oregon	Lost on November 2, 2023	
Summer Lynne Seasons	Tigard, Oregon	Lost on November 2, 2023	
Andrew Shayde	Lexington, Kentucky	Lost on November 2, 2023	
Bekah Telew	Seattle, Washington	Lost on November 2, 2023	
Team OK
Stephen Craig	Edmond, Oklahoma	Voted out on September 21, 2023	
James Brian "Huddy" Hudson	Isle of Palms, South Carolina	Winner on November 2, 2023	
Justin Palmer	Edmond, Oklahoma	Winner on November 2, 2023	
Yue Pun Szeto	Edmond, Oklahoma	Winner on November 2, 2023	
Pageant Queens
Lauren Cisneros Campbell	Denver, Colorado	Lost on October 5, 2023	
Lourdes Spurlock	Harrisonburg, Virginia	Lost on October 5, 2023	
Yolanda "Yoli" Stennett	White Plains, Maryland	Lost on October 5, 2023	
Erika "Devi" Deveney Shea Wall	Lorton, Virginia	Voted out on September 28, 2023	
Philly Forever
Anthony Franzzo	Philadelphia, Pennsylvania	Lost on October 26, 2023	
Erica Franzzo	Philadelphia, Pennsylvania	Lost on October 26, 2023	
Louis "Freddie" Meyers IV	Philadelphia, Pennsylvania	Lost on October 26, 2023	
Mike Ward	Philadelphia, Pennsylvania	Voted out on September 14, 2023	

== Elimination table ==
Results
Contestant	Episodes							
Contestant	1	2	3	4	5	6	7	8
Huddy	WIN	LOSS	WIN	SAFE	SAFE	WIN	ELIM	WINNER
Justin	WIN	LOSS	WIN	SAFE	SAFE	WIN	ELIM	WINNER
Yue	WIN	LOSS	WIN	SAFE	SAFE	WIN	ELIM	WINNER
Rae	ELIM	WIN	ELIM	SAFE	ELIM	ELIM	WIN	RUNNER-UP
Sarge	ELIM	WIN	ELIM	SAFE	ELIM	ELIM	WIN	RUNNER-UP
Elyse	ELIM	WIN	ELIM	SAFE	ELIM	ELIM	WIN	RUNNER-UP
Kei	ELIM	WIN	ELIM	SAFE	ELIM	ELIM	WIN	RUNNER-UP
Steven	SAFE	SAFE	WIN	WIN	SAFE	SAFE	SAFE	OUT
Summer	SAFE	SAFE	WIN	WIN	SAFE	SAFE	SAFE	OUT
Andrew	SAFE	SAFE	WIN	WIN	SAFE	SAFE	SAFE	OUT
Bekah	SAFE	SAFE	WIN	WIN	SAFE	SAFE	SAFE	OUT
Anthony	LOSS	ELIM	WIN	SAFE	WIN	SAFE	OUT	
Freddie	LOSS	ELIM	WIN	SAFE	WIN	SAFE	OUT	
Erica	LOSS	ELIM	WIN	SAFE	WIN	SAFE	OUT	
Melissa	SAFE	SAFE	ELIM	ELIM	LOSS	OUT		
Shaggy	SAFE	SAFE	ELIM	ELIM	LOSS	OUT		
Shu	SAFE	SAFE	ELIM	ELIM	LOSS	OUT		
Rachel	SAFE	SAFE	ELIM	ELIM	OUT			
Lauren	SAFE	SAFE	LOSS	OUT				
Lourdes	SAFE	SAFE	LOSS	OUT				
Yoli	SAFE	SAFE	LOSS	OUT				
Devi	SAFE	SAFE	OUT					
Stephen	WIN	OUT						
Mike	OUT							

- WINNER This contestant won Buddy Games.
- RUNNER-UP This contestant was a runner-up.
- WIN This contestant won the episode's Buddy Game.
- ELIM This contestant won Loser's Last Stand.
- SAFE This contestant was safe from elimination.
- LOSS This contestant was a part of a team that lost Loser's Last Stand, but was not eliminated.
- OUT This contestant was eliminated from the competition.

== Production ==
On April 12, 2023, it was announced that CBS had ordered the series. On July 17, 2023, it was announced that the series would premiere on September 14, 2023. On August 14, 2023, the contestants and teams were announced.

== Episodes ==
No.	Title	Original release date	Prod. code	U.S. viewers (millions)	Rating (18-49)
1	"Let the Buddy Games Begin!"	September 14, 2023	101	1.99	0.3
2	"Cornholio"	September 21, 2023	102	1.79	0.3
3	"It's Prom Night, Baby!"	September 28, 2023	103	1.77	0.2
4	"Buddy Betrayals"	October 5, 2023	104	2.02	0.3
5	"Meaner Colada"	October 12, 2023	105	1.91	0.3
6	"The Buddy Lines Are Drawn"	October 19, 2023	106	1.89	0.3
7	"Balancing Act"	October 26, 2023	107	1.98	0.3
8	"Lodge’s Last Hurrah"	November 2, 2023	108	1.86	0.3
