= Rebecca Budig =

American actress

- Born: June 26, 1973 (age 53); Cincinnati, Ohio, U.S.
- Occupations: Actress, television presenter
- Years active: 1993–present
- Spouses: Daniel Geller (m. 2000) Bob Guiney (m. 2004–2010) Michael Benson (m. 2012)
- Children: 1

Rebecca Budig (/ˈbʌdɪɡ/; born June 26, 1973) is an American actress and television presenter. Her career began in 1993, and in 1995, she was cast in the role of Michelle Bauer on the CBS soap opera Guiding Light. In 1999, she was cast as Greenlee Smythe on the ABC soap opera All My Children; she held the role off-and-on until the network series finale in 2011. In 2015, she was cast in the role of Hayden Barnes on General Hospital. In 2019, Budig was cast on L.A.'s Finest, as Carlene Hart, a drug-trafficking soccer mom. In August 2024, Budig began playing the contract role of Dr. Taylor Hayes on the CBS soap The Bold and the Beautiful.

In June 2025, Budig began hosting with Greg Rikaart in podcast series Soapy.

== Early life and career ==
Born in Cincinnati, Ohio and raised in Fort Mitchell, Kentucky, Budig was the youngest of three siblings and five half-siblings, as each of her parents had children by a previous marriage. At approximately 9 years of age, she returned to Cincinnati to attend the School for Creative and Performing Arts, which she did from grade 4 through 12, graduating in 1991. Budig then attended the Miami University until, at her manager's suggestion, she dropped out during her sophomore year and headed west, so as not to miss out on that pilot season's auditions.

Budig's first acting job was in Aerosmith's music video "Livin' on the Edge". She later had a cameo role as a teenage girl saved by Chris O'Donnell's character Dick Grayson in Batman Forever.

In 1995, Budig was about to audition for the role of Kelsey Jefferson on All My Children when she received an offer from Guiding Light, where she began her three-year stint as Michelle Bauer from (1995 to 1998).

Budig played the role of Patty in Captain Nuke and the Bomber Boys in 1995. She then portrayed Babsy in the 1996 film God's Lonely Man, followed by James Dean: A Race with Destiny where she played actress Natalie Wood and Bonehead Detectives in the Paleo World where she played Allie. Both films were released in 1997.

Budig's most famous role has been that of the spoiled, rich girl-turned-makeup company executive Greenlee Smythe on All My Children—a role which she originated on August 11, 1999. Greenlee was supposed to be a recurring role, but executives enjoyed Budig and offered her a three-year contract. While on All My Children, Budig garnered accolades from fans and press for her performance on the soap opera, as well as her character's pairing with Josh Duhamel's Leo du Pres. She was nominated for a Daytime Emmy Award for Outstanding Supporting Actress in a Drama Series in 2001 and again in 2003. Her onscreen pairing with Duhamel earned them a Daytime Emmy Award nomination as well, for America's Favorite Couple in 2002. She was often called "Little Budig" by Duhamel, who had given her the nickname. In 2003, Budig won a Soap Opera Digest Award for Outstanding Younger Lead Actress. In November 2005, Budig left the show to relocate to California.

Other notable roles include co-hosting The Sports Illustrated for Kids Show. Budig worked for the World Wrestling Federation as an interviewer for a short time on Sunday Night HEAT in 2000. She has made appearances on Out of Practice, as well as on Hope & Faith. She did a movie called The Perfect Child (2007) featured on Lifetime with the leading role as Sarah Daniels. In addition, Budig has been seen on CSI playing a role as a murdered lap dancer (Season 8, Episodes 9 & 10).

It was announced in late 2007 that Budig would be returning to All My Children as Greenlee Smythe, the role she originated. She had been replaced by another actress Sabine Singh earlier that year. She returned to the show in January 2008. However, she signed a limited contract with the show. Later, while rumors circulated of Budig's departure, she confirmed in October 2008 that she would be leaving the series again in February 2009. Budig cited the reason for her departure as wanting to return to the West Coast to be with her husband. Budig returned to 'All My Children in late December 2009 (when the show relocated production to Los Angeles), and remained with the series until its series finale in September 2011.

In 2010, Budig won the first and only season of the ABC show Skating with the Stars. The show paired celebrities with professional ice skaters, who competed each week. Since September 2013, she began co-hosting the syndicated lifestyle television show Better, alongside JD Roberto. In 2012, she appeared with Janeane Garofalo in the comedic movie Bad Parents. In February 2015, it was announced that Budig had been cast on General Hospital in an unknown "killer" role. She debuted the role of Hayden Barnes on March 20, 2015. On June 27, 2017, it was announced that Budig had been let go from General Hospital, with her dismissal cited as a "storyline necessity". On May 9, 2019, it was announced that she would reprise the role of Hayden Barnes on General Hospital. On June 27, 2019, it was announced that Budig would return in July; returning during the final moments of the July 8, 2019, episode. However, on November 20, 2019, Budig's exit was confirmed once more; she made her last appearance on November 27, 2019.

On August 6, 2024, Budig began airing on her fourth soap opera, The Bold and the Beautiful, stepping into the long-running role of Taylor Hayes.

She has hosted the podcast called Soapy with Greg Rikaart premiered on June 8, 2025, and the first special guest is Eric Braeden.

== Personal life ==
Budig is the youngest of eight children. She has five sisters and two brothers. In 2000, Budig married Dr. Daniel Geller; the marriage only lasted several months.

She met former Bachelor star Bob Guiney while hosting The Bachelor repeat shows on ABC Family. The two were married on July 3, 2004. On January 13, 2010, People Magazine reported that Budig and Guiney had decided to split, with Budig filing for divorce in April 2010.

Budig became engaged to television marketing executive Michael Benson on Christmas Day in 2010. The pair married in 2012. On May 1, 2014, Budig announced that she was five months pregnant with the couple's first baby. On September 8, 2014, Budig gave birth to a daughter.

== Filmography ==
=== Film ===
Year	Title	Role	Notes
1995	Batman Forever	Teenage Girl	
1995	Captain Nuke and the Bomber Boys	Patty Conrad	
1996	Star Hunter	Carrie	Video
1996	God's Lonely Man	Babsy	
1997	James Dean: Race with Destiny	Natalie Wood	
2002	Pride & Loyalty	Kelly Francini	
2010	Please Give	Big Back	
2012	Bad Parents	Allison	
2013	Getaway	Leanne Magna	
2020	About a Girl	Jill	Short Film
2022	Fit for Christmas	Lisa	CBS Original Film

=== Television ===
Year	Title	Role	Notes
1994	Murder or Memory: A Moment of Truth Movie	Kathy Hansen	TV film
1995–1998	Guiding Light	Michelle Bauer	Regular role
1997	Bonehead Detectives of the Paleoworld	Allie	TV series
1999–2005, 2008–2009, 2009–2011	All My Children	Greenlee Smythe	Regular role
2003–2004	Hope & Faith	Brooke Spencer	Recurring role (season 1)
2006	Out of Practice	Dr. Carla Munson	Episode: "Doctors Without Bidders"
2007	Perfect Child	Sarah Daniels	TV film
2007	CSI: Crime Scene Investigation	Joanna 'Candy' Krumsky	Episodes: "Cockroaches", "Lying Down with Dogs"
2007	The Beast	PJ	TV film
2009	How I Met Your Mother	Holli	Episode: "The Three Days Rule"
2011	Castle	Mandy Bronson	Episode: "One Life to Lose"
2013	Blue Bloods	Connie Patrick	Episode: "Ties That Bind"
2015–2017, 2019	General Hospital	Hayden Barnes	Contract role
2019	L.A.'s Finest	Carlene Hart	Recurring role
2021	Reunion Road Trip	Herself	TV Mini-Series 1 Episode
2023	State of Mind	Herself	YouTube Talk Show 1 Episode
2024–present	The Bold and the Beautiful	Taylor Hayes	Series regular

== Awards and nominations ==
List of awards and nominations for Rebecca Budig
Year	Award	Category	Work	Result	Ref.
2001	Daytime Emmy Award	Outstanding Supporting Actress in a Drama Series	All My Children	Nominated	
2001	Soap Opera Digest Award	Outstanding Younger Lead Actress	All My Children	Nominated	
2002	Daytime Emmy Award	America's Favorite Couple (shared with Josh Duhamel)	All My Children	Nominated	
2003	Daytime Emmy Award	Outstanding Supporting Actress in a Drama Series	All My Children	Nominated	
2003	Soap Opera Digest Award	Outstanding Younger Lead Actress	All My Children	Won	
2005	Daytime Emmy Award	Most Irresistible Combination (shared with Josh Duhamel)	All My Children	Nominated	
2014	Daytime Emmy Award	Outstanding Host in a Lifestyle/Travel Program (shared with Audra Lowe and JD Roberto)	The Better Show	Nominated	
2020	Daytime Emmy Award	Outstanding Supporting Actress in a Drama Series	General Hospital	Nominated	
2020	Soap Hub Awards	Favorite Actress from General Hospital	General Hospital	Nominated	
2020	Boden International Film Festival	Best Actress	About a Girl	Won	
2021	Global Shorts Award	The Best Shorts Competition	About a Girl	Won	
2021	Santana Barbara Short Film Awards	Best Actress	About a Girl	Won	
2022	IndieFEST Film Awards	Leading Actress in a Short Film	About a Girl	Won	

== See also ==
- Leo du Pres and Greenlee Smythe
