= Josh Duhamel =

American actor (born 1972)

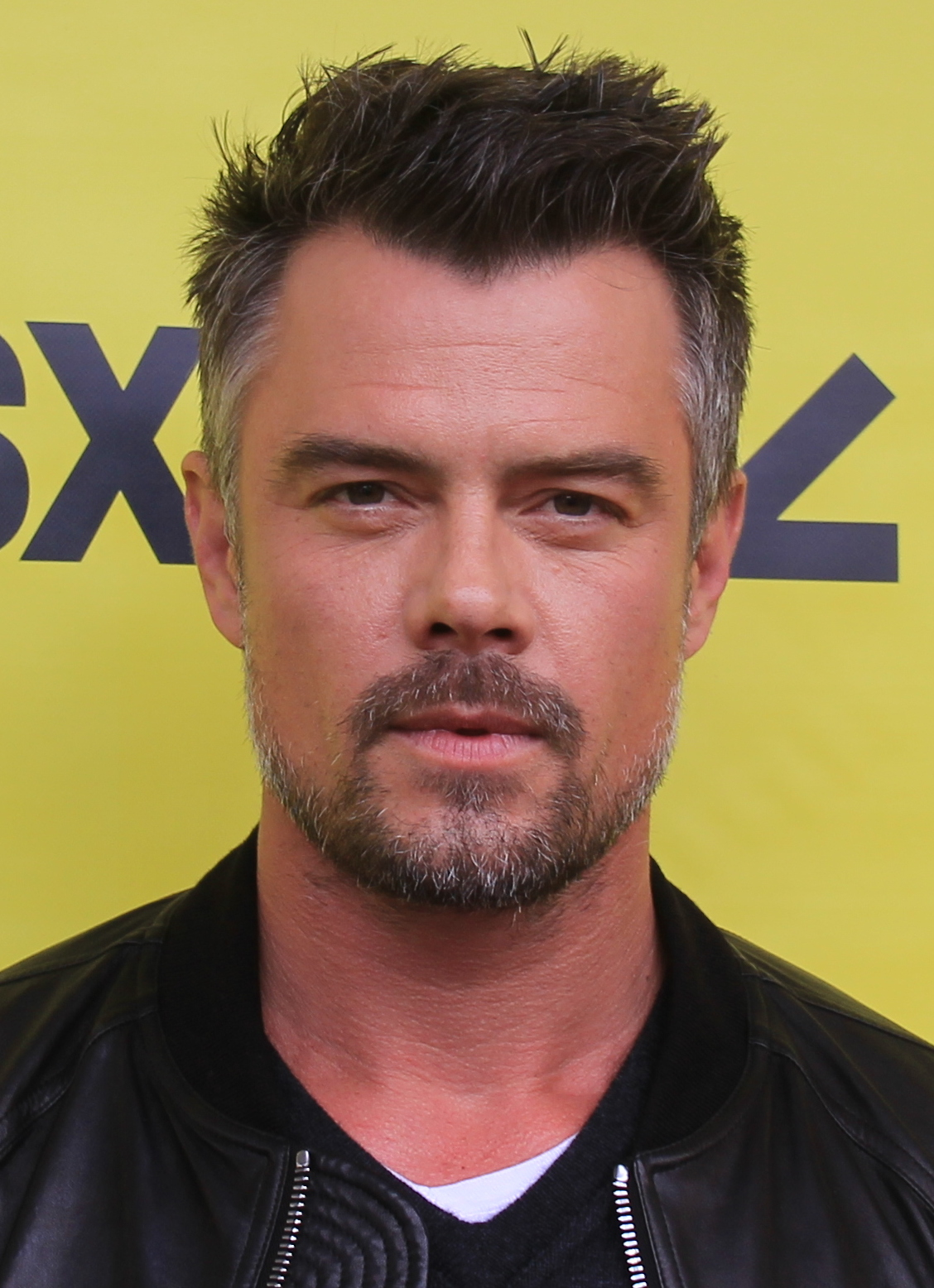
- Duhamel in 2017
- Born: Joshua David Duhamel; November 14, 1972 (age 53); Minot, North Dakota, U.S.
- Education: Minot State University (BA)
- Occupations: Actor, model
- Years active: 1999–present
- Spouses: Fergie (m. 2009; div. 2019) Audra Mari (m. 2022)
- Children: 3

Joshua David Duhamel (/dəˈmɛl/ də-MEL; born November 14, 1972) is an American actor. After working as a model, he made his acting debut as Leo du Pres on the ABC daytime soap opera All My Children, for which he won a Daytime Emmy Award, and later starred as Danny McCoy on NBC's Las Vegas.

Duhamel has ventured into film, appearing as one of the main protagonists in four of the Transformers films, most recently in the fifth entry, Transformers: The Last Knight (2017). He has also appeared in When in Rome (2010), Life as We Know It (2010), New Year's Eve (2011), Safe Haven (2013), and You're Not You (2014). In 2015, Duhamel co-starred on the short-lived CBS crime drama Battle Creek. He has also starred in several video games, most notably Call of Duty: WWII (2017). In 2018, he appeared in the coming-of-age film Love, Simon. In 2021, Duhamel starred in the role of Sheldon Sampson in the Netflix superhero series Jupiter's Legacy. He also portrayed the role of Jacob Lee in the 2022 survival horror game The Callisto Protocol.

== Early life ==
Joshua David Duhamel was born on November 14, 1972, in Minot, North Dakota. His mother, Bonnie L. (Bachmeier) Kemper, is a retired teacher and local businesswoman, and his father, Larry Duhamel, is an advertising salesman. Duhamel's family is Catholic.

His parents divorced during his youth. He was raised by his mother and stepfather, George Kemper. He has a younger sister and two younger maternal half-sisters. After graduating from Minot High School in 1991, Duhamel attended Minot State University and played backup quarterback for the university's football team. He planned to attend dental school, but dropped out one-and-a-half credits shy of his undergraduate degree. He later completed his credits and received his degree in 2005.

== Career ==
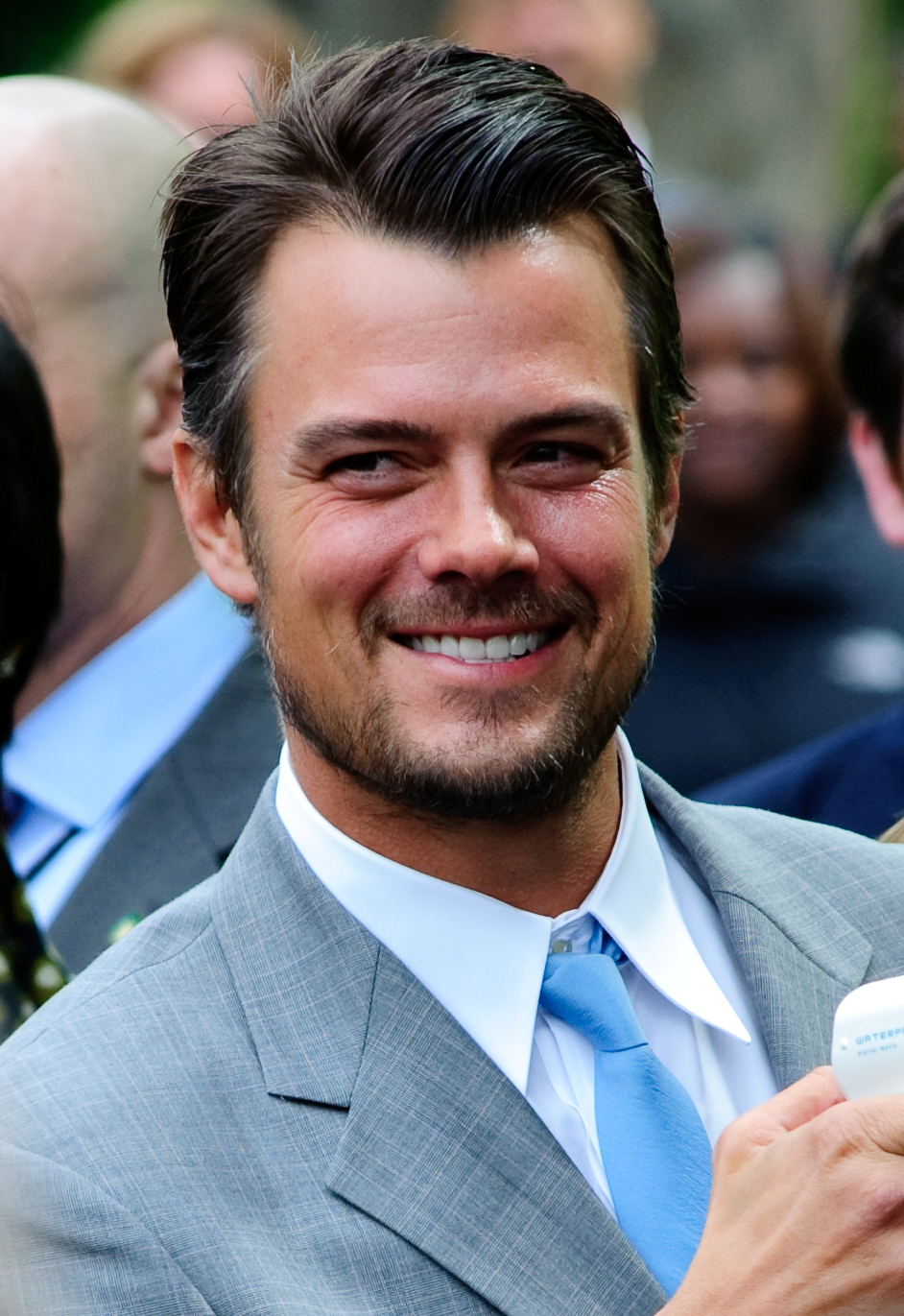
Duhamel in 2009

Duhamel has stated, "After college, I followed an ex-girlfriend to northern California, did a bunch of odd jobs." He won the title of Male Model of the Year in an International Modeling and Talent Association (IMTA) competition in 1997 (the runner-up was actor Ashton Kutcher).

Duhamel began his acting career as an extra in the music videos for Donna Summer's "I Will Go With You (Con te partirò)" and Christina Aguilera's "Genie in a Bottle" in 1999. Josh trained with Scott Sedita Acting Studios. Later that year, he won the role of Leo du Pres on the ABC soap opera All My Children. His work on the show, especially his character's pairing with Greenlee Smythe (portrayed by actress Rebecca Budig), garnered critical acclaim. In 2000, he posed fully nude for Greg Gorman's As I See It photography book.

In 2003, he received a Daytime Emmy Award nomination for the Special Fan Award for America's Favorite Couple in 2002, shared with Budig, and a Daytime Emmy Award for Outstanding Supporting Actor for his portrayal of Leo du Pres. Duhamel left All My Children in 2002 to pursue other acting opportunities. In 2003, Duhamel landed a primetime role on the NBC show Las Vegas, playing the head of security for the Montecito Casino, Danny McCoy. His character succeeded James Caan's as head of the casino after Caan departed the series at the end of the fourth season. The series ended in 2008.

Duhamel made his big-screen acting debut in 2004's Win a Date with Tad Hamilton!, then starred in the thriller Turistas (2006). After watching an episode of Las Vegas in which Duhamel's character had just returned from the war in Iraq, Steven Spielberg handpicked him for the role of Captain William Lennox in 2007's summer blockbuster film Transformers (a film for which Spielberg was the executive producer). Duhamel reprised the role in three of the sequels: Transformers: Revenge of the Fallen, released in June 2009, Transformers: Dark of the Moon, released in June 2011, and Transformers: The Last Knight, released in June 2017.

Duhamel was the official pace car driver for the 2009 Indianapolis 500, driving the 2010 Chevrolet Camaro pace car. In 2010, he played the lead role in the film When in Rome as Nick Beamon. In 2014 Duhamel starred in the touching drama You're Not You playing the husband of Kate (Hilary Swank), who has the degenerative disease ALS.

On March 23, 2013, Duhamel hosted the 2013 Kids' Choice Awards, which was broadcast live from Los Angeles, California. He and his co-star from Safe Haven, Julianne Hough, performed a Safe Haven-themed showcase appearance via video on The Price is Right with Drew Carey.

In 2016, he starred as Frank Dunning in the Hulu science fiction thriller miniseries 11.22.63.

In 2018, he appeared in a Taco Bell commercial to advertise Mexican spiced fries with nacho cheese sauce called Web of Fries.

In March 2018, it was announced that Duhamel would star alongside Megan Fox, in the independent family comedy Think Like a Dog. In the same year, he starred in the romantic comedy-drama film, Love, Simon.

On February 11, 2019, it was announced that Duhamel had been cast as Sheldon Sampson in the Netflix superhero series, Jupiter's Legacy. The series premiered on May 7, 2021, and was canceled less than a month later.

In February 2021, it was announced that Duhamel would co-star opposite Jennifer Lopez in the film Shotgun Wedding, replacing Armie Hammer, who had left the project in January, following controversy concerning sexually explicit social media activity. In August 2021, it was announced that Duhamel joined Renée Zellweger in The Thing About Pam limited series on NBC. He was to play a defense attorney, Joel Schwartz, on this show based on a real-life crime story.

In early 2022, it was announced that Duhamel had been cast as a series regular on The Mighty Ducks: Game Changers, for its second season, as Colin Cole, a former NHL player-turned-coach who runs the hockey institute.

On September 23, 2022, Duhamel's film Bandit, based on the best-selling novel and true story about The Flying Bandit, was released in theatres and on demand. The film received positive reviews with critics calling it a career-best performance for Duhamel.

== Personal life ==
=== Relationships and family ===
Duhamel met and began dating singer Stacy Ann Ferguson, better known as Fergie, in September 2004 after she appeared on Las Vegas with her then-band, The Black Eyed Peas. The couple married on January 10, 2009, in a Catholic ceremony at the Church Estate Vineyards in Malibu, California. They have a son born in August 2013. In September 2017, the couple announced that they had separated earlier in the year. In June 2019, they filed for divorce after two years of separation. Their divorce was finalized in November 2019.

In 2018, Duhamel began dating former Miss World America Audra Mari. The couple married on September 10, 2022. They have a son born in January 2024 and a daughter born in May 2026.

=== Interests and politics ===
Duhamel is a practicing Catholic and attends church regularly.

On April 8, 2016, Duhamel posted a selfie wearing a T-shirt bearing the name of Doug Burgum, then a candidate for the Republican nomination for governor of North Dakota in the 2016 election. On June 28, 2023, Duhamel endorsed Burgum, then governor of North Dakota, in the 2024 Republican Party presidential primary. In an Instagram story, Duhamel wrote, "I don't normally get involved in politics, but Governor Burgum has become a good friend over the years and I can't think of anyone better than him to be our president."

=== Residence ===
Duhamel owns two cabins in Minnesota. In October 2023, in an interview on In Depth with Graham Bensinger, he said, "And the older I got, the more I wanted to come back here [to North Dakota]." He described his lake house as a place where he "can get back to being who I really am."

== In the media ==
In 2012, Duhamel was inducted into the Scandinavian-American Hall of Fame, a signature event of Norsk Høstfest. On May 19, 2022, Minot State University named their Summer Theatre stage the "Josh Duhamel Stage" in his honor.

== Other ventures ==
In 2005, he became the co-owner of 10 North Main, a restaurant in Minot, North Dakota.

Duhamel is a spokesman for North Dakota tourism and has appeared in promotional videos for the state over the past decade. In 2022, Duhamel was paid $75,000 to become the face of the state's tourism campaign for the next two years.

== Filmography ==
=== Film ===
Year	Title	Role	Notes
2004	The Picture of Dorian Gray	Dorian Gray	
2004	Win a Date with Tad Hamilton!	Tad Hamilton	Nominated — Teen Choice Award for Choice Movie: Male Breakout Star; Nominated — Teen Choice Award for Choice Movie Liar
2006	Turistas	Alex	Nominated — Teen Choice Award for Choice Movie Actor: Horror/Thriller
2007	Transformers	Captain William Lennox	Nominated — Teen Choice Award for Choice Movie Rumble (Captain Lennox vs. Blackout)
2009	Transformers: Revenge of the Fallen	Major William Lennox	
2010	The Romantics	Tom	
2010	When in Rome	Nick Beamon	
2010	Ramona and Beezus	Hobart	
2010	Life as We Know It	Eric Messer	Nominated — Teen Choice Award for Choice Movie Actor: Romantic Comedy
2011	Transformers: Dark of the Moon	Lieutenant Colonel William Lennox	
2011	New Year's Eve	Sam Ahern	
2012	Fire with Fire	Jeremy Coleman	Direct-to-video
2012	Planet Ocean	Narrator	Documentary
2012	Wings	Ace (voice)	
2013	Movie 43	Anson	Segment: "Beezel"
2013	Safe Haven	Alex Wheatley	
2013	Scenic Route (aka Wrecked)	Mitchell	
2014	Wings: Sky Force Heroes	Ace (voice)	
2014	You're Not You	Evan	
2014	Lost in the Sun	John Wheeler	
2014	Don Peyote	Transient	
2015	Bravetown	Alexander Weller	
2016	Misconduct	Ben	
2016	Spaceman	Bill "Spaceman" Lee	
2017	The Institute	Detective	
2017	The Show	Adam Rogers	
2017	CHiPs	Rick	
2017	Transformers: The Last Knight	Colonel William Lennox	
2018	Love, Simon	Jack Spier	
2019	Capsized: Blood in the Water	John Lippoth	
2019	Buddy Games	Bobfather	Writer, Director, Producer
2020	The Lost Husband	James O'Connor	
2020	Think Like a Dog	Lukas Reed	
2021	Batman: The Long Halloween	Harvey Dent / Two-Face (voice)	Direct-to-video
2021	Night of the Animated Dead	Harry Cooper (voice)	
2022	Bandit	Gilbert Galvan	
2022	Blackout	Cain	
2022	Shotgun Wedding	Tom	Released on Amazon Prime Video
2023	Buddy Games: Spring Awakening	Bobfather	Director, Producer
2025	Off the Grid	Jack Guy	
2025	London Calling	Tommy Ward	
2025	Not Without Hope	Timothy Close	
2026	Preschool	Alan	
2027	The Rescue †	TBA	Post-production
TBA	The Good Samaritan †	Sean Fuller	Filming

=== Television ===
Year	Title	Role	Notes
1999–2002; 2011	All My Children	Leo du Pres	Contract role Daytime Emmy Award for Outstanding Supporting Actor in a Drama Series (2002); Nominated — Daytime Emmy Award for Outstanding Supporting Actor in a Drama Series (2001, 2003); Nominated — Daytime Emmy Special Fan Award: America's Favorite Couple (shared with Rebecca Budig); Nominated — Soap Opera Digest Award for Outstanding Young Lead Actor
2002	Ed	Richard Reed	Episode: "The Shot"
2003–2008	Las Vegas	Danny McCoy	Main role, 106 episodes Nominated — Teen Choice Award for Choice Breakout TV Star - Male; Nominated — Teen Choice Award for Choice TV Actor - Drama/Action Adventure
2004–2007	Crossing Jordan	Danny McCoy	3 episodes
2008	The Replacements	Himself (voice)	3 episodes
2009–2012	Fanboy & Chum Chum	Ozwald "Oz" Harmounian (voice)	Recurring role
2011–2012	Bomb Patrol Afghanistan	Narrator (voice)	17 episodes
2012–2015	Jake and the Never Land Pirates	Captain Flynn (voice)	14 episodes
2015	Battle Creek	FBI Special Agent Milton Chamberlain	Main role, 13 episodes
2016	11.22.63	Frank Dunning	Recurring role, 4 episodes
2018	LA to Vegas	Captain Kyle	Episode: "Two and a Half Pilots"
2018	Unsolved	Detective Greg Kading	Main role, 10 episodes
2019	Veronica Mars	Magnus	Episode: "Chino and the Man"
2021	Jupiter's Legacy	Sheldon Sampson / The Utopian	Main role, 8 episodes
2021	Love, Victor	Jack Spier	Episode: "There's No Gay in Team"
2021–2022	Blade Runner: Black Lotus	Marlowe (voice)	
2022	The Thing About Pam	Joel Schwartz	Main role
2022	The Mighty Ducks: Game Changers	Coach Colin Cole	Main role (Season 2)
2023	Buddy Games	Himself	Host
2025–2026	Ransom Canyon	Staten Kirkland	Main role

=== Video games ===
Year	Title	Voice role	Notes
2015	Skylanders: SuperChargers	High Volt	
2017	Call of Duty: WWII	Technical Sergeant William Pierson	Also motion capture
2022	The Callisto Protocol	Jacob Lee	Also motion capture
