= Frankie Stone =

- All My Children character
- Portrayed by: Elizabeth Hendrickson
- First appearance: September 27, 2001
- Last appearance: November 28, 2001
- Created by: Richard Culliton
- Introduced by: Jean Dadario Burke
In-universe information
- Occupation: Con artist
- Mother: Gwyneth Bennett Stone
- Sisters: Maggie Stone
- Aunts: Vanessa Bennett
- First cousins: David Hayward; Leo du Pres; Trey Kenyon
- Other relatives: Babe Carey; Marissa Tasker; Leora Hayward; Oliver Castillo; AJ Chandler

Frankie Stone is a fictional character from the American daytime drama All My Children. Portrayed by Elizabeth Hendrickson from September 27 to November 28, 2001, the character was one of the more popular additions to the series, having gained a significant following after only three months. When she was killed off, the popularity and loyal following the character had obtained resulted in Hendrickson being brought back as the character's identical twin sister, Maggie Stone.

== Background ==
=== Audition and character concept ===
The writers scripted Frankie's birth date to be on April 26, 1982, two years older than Bianca.

Actress Elizabeth Hendrickson had been auditioning for All My Children for over a year before acquiring the role of Frankie, and had originally auditioned for the role of Bianca Montgomery. The producers, however, felt that she was better suited for the part of Frankie Stone, a new character head writer Richard Culliton was scripting for an upcoming murder mystery storyline. Hendrickson approached the audition in a calm demeanor. "Going into this audition," she stated, "I was very relaxed, not only because I've been there like a dozen times, but I thought I had no shot at all. Frankie's character is nothing like me!! I was told she was tomboyish yet sexy. I thought to myself, how can I pull that off? So I threw on a tight little baseball shirt and just went in and did it." Hendrickson further relayed, "About two weeks later, my agent told me that it was between me and another girl and my tape was going to be tested. I for sure thought I didn't get the part. I always make my best impression in person. I feel that audition tapes are so impersonal. About a week later, I found out the news and believe me I was ecstatic."

=== Characterization and introduction ===
The writers detailed Frankie to be a wisecracking tomboy with feminine sex appeal. Hendrickson described the character as someone who "would never in her right mind get all dolled up." So when a scene finally called for the character to, in fact, wear a dress, Hendrickson stated that it did not feel right. "I've really become that character when I'm on set," she revealed. "So I played that uncomfortable feeling throughout the scene, I think it worked."

Other aspects adding depth to Frankie were her "rough around the edges" personality and vulnerability, the character being a complex blend of both, something Hendrickson found challenging but admired: "I really wanted to get that across. Even though her intentions were not always good, she always yearned for love from unexpected places."

Frankie's debut on the series is what Hendrickson describes as her most memorable day as part of the All My Children cast. She was nervous about playing opposite legendary soap opera diva Susan Lucci, and did not know how to introduce herself:

My most memorable day would have to be my first day because I was so, I don't get nervous, I really don't. This might sound cheesy, but it feels like home to me when I walk on to a set or on stage, it's refreshing. And I was so nervous. My first scene was being hit by a car by Susan Lucci. Please, tell me how that is not freaky? I was so scared. And she's sitting in the car and I hadn't introduced myself to her yet. And I was so nervous. 'Should I go up to her and say hi, I'm Elizabeth? Or is she going to come up to me and say, Hi, I'm Susan. I'm not one to be star struck. But I guess I was for the first time. I was so nervous.' And it wasn't like a comforting scene where she was going to walk up and be like, 'Hi, I'm Erica Kane, nice to meet you. Welcome to Pine Valley.' Instead it was, 'I'm going to run you over with my car and throw names at you and make you look like a horrible person.' And then before the scene, she had introduced herself and she is just the sweetest woman in the entire world. She's so sweet. She said, 'Hi, I'm Susan.' Ahhh, breathe. Everything's fine. Now just go get hit by the car.

=== Portrayal ===
Portraying Frankie called for Hendrickson to be somewhat androgynous. She was not sure herself of her character's sexual orientation or true motives when interacting with most characters. "At first," she cited, "in the description of the character, they alluded to the fact that she was a lesbian. Then when I started working, I went to Jean (Dadario Burke), the executive producer, and I asked 'Is she?' She said, 'Well, she's a con artist. You read your script and make the decision yourself.'"

Hendrickson theorized that when the writers saw the chemistry between Bianca and Frankie, "that's when they started pushing the fact that she was a lesbian." When it came down to Frankie's true purpose on the show, however, she was merely a plot device, a soon-to-be victim in order to initiate a murder mystery storyline. At the time, Hendrickson found humor in her character's demise, citing that a character can always come back. Though the obstacle to resurrecting Frankie was that Frankie's dead body was seen onscreen and on the floor for hours, this did not stop Hendrickson and her co-stars from speculating: "Frankie's body was found. We have this running joke that it wasn't Frankie, it was Maggie this whole time, posing as Frankie. Maggie knew that she was in trouble, so she called Frankie to come, and in reality Maggie was the one who was killed and Frankie is still alive."

When asked in an interview if she had any reservations about taking the part of Frankie due to the character's potential romance with Bianca, Hendrickson stated that she did not, and that she loves roles that are challenging. This one happened to be a type of role she had never portrayed before.

== Reception ==
Frankie had an immediate impact on viewers. Within a week, fans were fond of the character.

Frankie dead on the floor in her room. The imagery of the character's death and her departure from the series significantly impacted viewers.

I am still amazed as to all of the support I have received from the audience. This is all a dream come true. You guys are the greatest fans ever! Working on this show is such an honor and I am so relieved that everyone has responded so positively towards my character. I know how dedicated fans are to AMC and I was petrified that no one would like me. Especially playing opposite one of, if not the most profound actress on daytime television, Susan Lucci. But after my first week, my mother called to tell me about how everyone was raving about my character on ABC.com. I can't even describe how happy I was.

— Elizabeth Hendrickson, 2001

Frankie's death also had an impact; fans believed she was killed off due to the show's fear of portraying a homosexual romance, since the character was already being developed as a romantic interest for Bianca. Head writer at the time, Richard Culliton, however, stated that he had already planned for Frankie to die in his murder mystery storyline. Despite Culliton's explanation, viewers were largely disappointed. The character's identical twin sister, Maggie Stone, was brought on instead, as a result of fans campaigning for Hendrickson's return.
