= Leo du Pres =

- All My Children character
- Portrayed by: Josh Duhamel
- Duration: 1999–2003; 2011
- First appearance: November 22, 1999
- Last appearance: August 5, 2011
- Created by: Agnes Nixon and Jean Passanante
- Introduced by: Jean Dadario Burke (1999); Julie Hanan Carruthers (2011)
In-universe information
- Occupation: Co-Author of a book about Vanessa Cortlandt with Simone Torres; Assistant at IncredibleDreams.com; Former Male half of the "Young Couple of Enchantment" campaign Former Vice-President of Cortlandt Electronics; Former Assistant to Tad Martin on Nothing But the Truth
- Mother: Vanessa Bennett
- Half-brothers: David Hayward; Trey Kenyon
- Spouse: Laura Kirk English (2001–2002); Greenlee Smythe (2002)
- Aunts: Gwyneth Bennett Stone
- Nephews: Oliver Castillo
- Nieces: Babe Carey; Marissa Tasker; Leora Hayward
- First cousins: Frankie Stone; Maggie Stone
- Other relatives: AJ Chandler

Leonardo "Leo" du Pres is a fictional character from the American ABC Daytime soap opera All My Children. The role was portrayed by actor Josh Duhamel from November 22, 1999, to the character's death onscreen on October 17, 2002. Duhamel reprised his role on December 24, 2003, and for two episodes in August 2011.

Duhamel won a Daytime Emmy for Best Supporting Actor in 2002 for the role. His portrayal of the character, and the effect it had on viewers, was cited in a TV Guide interview as causing mania, an extension being Leo's death, as viewers could not grasp such a fate for their beloved con artist. On June 6, 2011, Entertainment Weekly reported that Duhamel would return in August to reprise his role as Leo du Pres in a dream of Greenlee Smythe's.

== Storyline ==
Leo started off his life not knowing his father or his brother. Vanessa had had an affair with a married French vineyard owner, or so it was said. Leo's father refused to leave his wife, and Vanessa was forced to raise her son by herself. She took to a life of finding rich, eligible men to finance herself and her son.

For portions of Leo's life, Vanessa claimed to be his aunt in order to protect her image. Her desire to be among the elite of society prevented her from announcing that she'd had a child out of wedlock.

Short on cash and tired of his boarding school lifestyle, Leo headed to Pine Valley to finally meet his mother's newest husband, Palmer Cortlandt. There was one problem. Palmer was sure that Leo was Vanessa's younger lover. He had his cronies kidnap and drug Leo. Palmer even planned to make it look like Leo had killed Vanessa in a fit of jealousy. Palmer Cortlandt found out just before the staged shooting that Leo was Vanessa's son and jumped in front of the bullet. Leo was thought to be involved in the shooting, but he was never charged with anything. Vanessa learned that Palmer had staged the shooting and used a guilt trip to convince Palmer to hire Leo as a vice president at Cortlandt Electronics.

Leo didn't really like the idea of working for a living and continued mulling about town. He met up with Greenlee Smythe, and the two of them made plans to win the affection of their crushes, Becca Tyree for Leo and Scott Chandler for Greenlee. Greenlee went too far and hooked up with a shady character in an attempt to make Ryan jealous. Leo saved the day by tracking down Greenlee and Ken, but he took a switchblade to the hand in the process.

As it became clearer and clearer that Ryan Lavery wasn't going to fall for Greenlee, Greenlee developed a relationship with Leo du Pres. The two fooled around, but neither one put much thought into the fact that they could have a relationship with each other. The pair even teamed up on a bet as to whether or not Leo could seduce Becca Tyree into giving her virginity to him.

Greenlee covered for Ryan when he "borrowed" two million dollars from his Internet company's tills. She got involved with a sleazy loan shark, with ties to the underworld, named Wade Randall. Wade loaned Greenlee the money to cover Ryan's debt so that Ryan would not be arrested for embezzlement, but Wade immediately took Greenlee to task by demanding that she introduce him to her grandfather. Greenlee turned him in to the police, and he was arrested. Greenlee's trouble with Wade, though, was anything but over. Wade somehow managed to regain his freedom, and he immediately went after Greenlee for turning him in to the cops.

Wade held Greenlee at gunpoint and demanded that she get him a sizeable chunk of cash and a passport out of the country. Greenlee tried her best to get Leo out of the way by telling him that she didn't care about him and wanted nothing more to do with him. Nevertheless, Leo continued hanging around and almost got shot in the process. Wade later collared Greenlee and held her hostage for one million dollars in ransom. Woodruff agreed to drop off the money at the boathouse in order to win his granddaughter's freedom. Leo happened upon the scene and tried to muscle Wade into submission. He failed, and Wade locked Leo and Greenlee in a faulty elevator. Leo helped Greenlee escape the elevator before its cable snapped; Leo wasn't as lucky, though he did manage to escape before the elevator totally bottomed out.

Afterwards, Leo and Greenlee were closer than ever. Leo took Greenlee to the tropics to toast their new relationship. What Greenlee didn't know was that Leo was using her grandfather's ransom money to fund the getaway. When Greenlee learned the truth, she and Leo returned to Pine Valley, and Leo was subsequently arrested for theft. Greenlee asked her grandfather to have the charges against Leo dropped. Woodruff said that he'd talk to Leo.

Woodruff visited Leo in his jail cell and said that he'd drop the charges against Leo if Leo agreed to take the rest of the ransom money and fly to Europe and never see Greenlee again. Leo refused and won Woodruff's respect in the process. Greenlee, however, thought that Leo had accepted the offer and severed her ties to Leo. She later learned from her grandfather that Leo hadn't accepted the offer, but by then Leo was furious with Greenlee and was questioning whether or not he really wanted Greenlee in his life.

Erica picked Leo—with a little help from Bianca, to be the male half of the Young Couple of Enchantment ad campaign. Leo and Bianca bonded almost from day one, prompting Erica to believe that her little girl had a crush on Leo. That wasn't the case. On Halloween 2000, Leo escorted Bianca to her high school dance. When Bianca overheard some girls talking poorly about her, she hooked up with her friend, Rain, and headed to a bar. When Leo and Greenlee tracked down Bianca, they realized that Bianca was in a gay bar. Leo comforted Bianca after she revealed to him that she was gay, and he used his unique brand of humor to help make her feel better about herself.

Leo and Greenlee found themselves growing more and more fond of each other—even though both had originally been working together to go to their supposedly true loves, Becca Tyree and Scott Chandler, respectively. Eventually, Leo and Greenlee's attraction turned to love. In the winter of 2001, Greenlee asked Leo to marry her. Leo feared accepting her proposal because Roger Smythe, Greenlee's father, had learned that Leo had originally gone to Pine Valley to swindle Greenlee out of her fortune. As it turned out, Leo had developed true feelings for Greenlee and no longer wanted her money.

Leo had a prenuptial agreement drawn up that would prevent him from seeing even one cent of Greenlee's money after a split. Roger caught wind of the agreement and flew in a woman from Verona, Italy, named Sybella di Courcey. During his days as a con, Leo had taken Sybella for everything she had. Sybella lied and said that Leo had asked her for a prenup too—though that part of the story was a lie; she had made it up to ruin Leo's happiness, the same way that he had stolen her money. Greenlee and Leo promptly split, though it was clear that each loved the other.

Later that spring, a frantic Brooke English begged Leo du Pres to pretend to be interested in her dying daughter, Laura, so that the romantic interest would spur Laura to fight for her life. Leo initially refused, but over time, he and Laura grew closer. It was unclear if Leo truly loved Laura, but it was clear that he really did care for Laura and wanted to see her recover fully. On June 18, Leo popped the question to a hospitalized Laura - and she accepted. Just two days later, the pair married in Laura's hospital room with Brooke, Bianca Montgomery, best man David Hayward, and nurse Zora in attendance.

However, in spite of her happiness, Laura's health continued to deteriorate rapidly and the only possible way to save her life was with a heart transplant. In the nick of time, Leo learned that friend Gillian Lavery had been shot in the head, and managed to convince her grieving husband Ryan to donate Gillian's heart to Laura. Laura rapidly recovered, but was quite needy. Leo almost immediately realized that as much as he wanted to, he did not love Laura. Leo loved only Greenlee, and he could barely even make love to his wife. Laura began to go insane, plotted against Greenlee, and ultimately guilted Leo into a "proper" ceremony, which was stopped only because Greenlee set off the sprinkler system. Leo took the downpour as symbolic, and cut all ties with Laura. Within a few months, she left town to get therapy, and Leo and Greenlee happily reunited.

Leo spent most of 2002 coping with his bizarre and criminal family. The first family issue was Vanessa kidnapping and nearly killing Greenlee, and the revelation that Vanessa had long been Proteus, head of an international drug cartel. Leo began to wonder about the drug money she had stashed away somewhere, seeing that cash as a way for him and Greenlee to eventually move to their favorite city, Paris. Vanessa developed a split personality and was admitted to the hospital as a psychiatric patient. Leo was drawn into his mother's needs in spite of his better judgment.

Leo also distrusted Vanessa's new lawyer, Trey Kenyon—and with good reason. Trey plotted against him and Vanessa, both out of revenge and to get his hands on the Proteus money. There was a brief moment of happiness when, even though Greenlee's family disapproved of him, he managed to marry her in spring 2002. Even this was marred, due to former associates of Vanessa's—who also wanted the drug money—crashing the wedding with Vanessa in tow and inadvertently shooting and killing Greenlee's father. The newlyweds managed to get away for a few days for a honeymoon, but their return home was back to business as usual.

Vanessa went into a coma, died for a few seconds, and returned as the calm, sweet mother Leo had never had—Nessa. Leo felt close to her for the first time. Leo also discovered he had another long-lost relative, after cousins Maggie and Frankie had arrived in town earlier in the year—Trey was actually his older brother, Ben Shepherd. Trey had assumed his dead best friend's identity and had dedicated his life to wreaking havoc on the mother who had abandoned him at birth. Leo, also a lost soul, quickly accepted Trey and forgave the many misdeeds Trey had perpetrated on him in the past months. Working with Greenlee and Kendall, they found the Proteus "stash," worthless stocks. They thought the trail had finally reached a dead end, and could only laugh.

In truth, "Nessa," who had been taken into federal custody, had reverted to being Vanessa, and knew of the real treasure-a fortune in diamonds. Greenlee was increasingly frightened by Nessa and never believed for a second that she was kind or sweet. She demanded that Leo finally give up his "loser" family for good, and he agreed. But moments before their flight to Paris, he received a call from David, whom he had been helping out after his latest arrest and imprisonment. Unfortunately, while Leo was absent, Vanessa kidnapped Greenlee. She took her to Miller's Falls and informed Leo he had to find and give her the diamonds before she would release Greenlee.

In a panic, Leo found the jewels and raced to the falls with Trey. When Vanessa refused to release her hostage, Leo began dropping the priceless gems over the falls, one by one—causing Vanessa to lose it. When Vanessa threatens to shoot Leo for dropping her diamonds, Greenlee fights with Vanessa for the gun but is knocked off the edge, falling onto a ledge 20 feet below. Leo thinks Greenlee is dead, and in retaliation, throws the rest of the diamonds into the falls. Vanessa screams angrily at her loss, and in return, calls Leo a fool for ruining their future. Leo and Vanessa then had a very bad argument, which apparently resulted in him strangling her for pushing Greenlee over the edge. Leo's strangle caused Vanessa to fire the gun, waking up Greenlee. Reaching her breaking point, Vanessa aimed the gun at Leo's head while gasping for air, threatening him not to make her kill him. All of a sudden, Greenlee's call gives him hope. Leo lets go of Vanessa's neck and he starts to climb down to her. When Vanessa realizes Greenlee survived the fall, she begins shooting at her. Leo attacks Vanessa and they wrestle for control of the gun. Unfortunately their combined weight during the fight for the gun breaks the railing and both Leo and Vanessa fall 100 feet to the river. His body is never recovered and neither was Vanessa's.

Leo returned briefly nine years later in August 2011, when he appeared to Greenlee in a dream.

== See also ==
- Leo du Pres and Greenlee Smythe
