= Andrew Miller (actor) =

Canadian actor, writer, and director (born 1969)

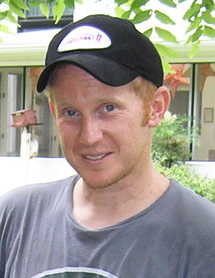
- Miller in 2008
- Born: February 25, 1969 (age 57); Toronto, Ontario, Canada
- Occupations: Actor; writer; director
- Years active: 1990–present
- Known for: Cube
- Spouse: Eden Riegel (m. 2007)
- Children: 2
- Relatives: Sam Riegel (brother-in-law)

Andrew Miller (born February 25, 1969) is a Canadian actor, writer, and director. He is known for his role as Kazan in the 1997 science fiction horror film Cube.

== Career ==
Miller began his career as an actor at age 16 in Toronto, Ontario, Canada. Early theater roles include Moritz Stiefel in Frank Wedekind's Spring Awakening and Eugene Morris Jerome in Neil Simon's Brighton Beach Memoirs. Film roles include Simon in South of Wawa, written by bestselling Canadian novelist and screenwriter Lori Lansens; Kazan, a disabled savant, in Vincenzo Natali's Cube; and Donald in Oh, What a Night, for which he was nominated for a 1992 Genie Award for Best Supporting Actor.

As a screenwriter, Miller co-wrote the films Simon Sez and Miramax Pictures' Boys and Girls. He also co-wrote Vincenzo Natali's independently produced feature film, Nothing, in which he also starred.

He also created the web series Imaginary Bitches. He has directed and produced all episodes, and written the first five episodes, as well as episodes 8, 10, 12, and 13. He co-wrote episodes 6 and 7. Imaginary Bitches was nominated for a 2008 Daytime Emmy in the New Approaches in Daytime Entertainment category. He is also adapting the novel The Beach for television.

Besides his work in Hollywood, Andrew Miller also has a career as a teacher at a school for children with autism and other conditions. Some of his work includes teaching drama and literature.

== Filmography ==
- 2010 Iris Expanding as Adam, The Morning Show Host
- 2003 Nothing as Andrew
- 1998 Thanks of a Grateful Nation as Jeff Bradford
- 1998 Circles as Garrett Winters
- 1997 Cube as Kazan
- 1995 Last of the Dogmen as Briggs
- 1994 Trapped in Paradise as Deputy Myers
- 1994 Trial by Jury as Krasny
- 1994 Boozecan as Eric
- 1993 JFK: Reckless Youth as Rip Horton
- 1993 Family Pictures as Bob
- 1993 Plashch Kazanovy
- 1992 Oh, What a Night as Donald
- 1992 A Savage Christmas: The Fall of Hong Kong as Ike Friesen
- 1991 South of Wawa as Simon
- 1991 Perfectly Normal as Pizza Guy
- 1990 Princes in Exile as Tyler
- 1987 Check it Out! as Derek

== Director ==
- Boy Meets Girl (2010)
- Imaginary Bitches (2008–2009) (TV series) (14 episodes)
- Cooking to Get Lucky (2008) (TV series) (5 episodes)

== Writer ==
- Tremors (pilot) (2018)
- Backstrom (2015) (TV series) (2 episodes)
- The Secret Circle (2011)
- Imaginary Bitches (2008–2009) (web series) (12 episodes)
- Nothing (2003)
- Boys and Girls (2000)
- Simon Sez (1999)

== Producer ==
- The Secret Circle (2011)
- Imaginary Bitches (2008–2009) (TV series) executive producer / producer (14 episodes)
- Nothing (2003) (co-producer)
- Percy Jackson and the Olympians (2023–) Co-executive producer
- YAGA (2026) Executive producer

== Personal life ==
Miller attended McGill University in Montreal, Quebec, Canada, where he studied Political Science and Economics.

In March 2007, Miller became engaged to Eden Riegel who had been friends with Cameron Mathison (Ryan Lavery on All My Children). Miller and Riegel married on September 30, 2007, and their first son, Jack Oscar Miller, was born on May 21, 2011. In June 2013, Riegel announced through Twitter that she was expecting her second child, a boy. Her second son, Henry Isaac Miller, was born on December 20, 2013.
