= Brian King (writer) =

American screenwriter

- Occupations: Writer, director
- Years active: 1999-present

Matthew "Brian King" is an American screenwriter and director known for writing Haunter, Night Train, and Cypher. He was nominated in 2014 for Best Screenplay at the Fangoria Chainsaw Awards.

== Career ==
In an interview for King's film Haunter, director Vincenzo Natali discussed how grateful he is to King after working with him on both Haunter and Cypher. "Out of the blue I came across my friend Brian King’s script for what was then called Company Man. Ultimately it was named Cypher. And then that came together very quickly. It took maybe...I don’t know, it was another 6-8 months and we were shooting the movie. And almost an identical thing happened with Haunter because I had these sort of long-standing, very ambitious projects, High Rise and Neuromancer that I’d been trying to do after Splice. And, invariably, it takes a long time. So, in the interim, Brian came up with this new script, entirely his creation. And I really loved it. We put it together in probably about the same time period, like eight months or less and we were shooting. So Brian keeps saving my ass. That’s how it works."

== Filmography ==
=== Writer ===
Year	Title	Notes
2001	The Day the World Ended	TV movie
2002	Cypher	
2009	Night Train	
2013	Haunter	

=== Director ===
Year	Title	Notes
1999	This Is Harry Lehman	
2009	Night Train	

== Awards and nominations ==
Year	Award	Category	Title	Result
2012	Fangoria Chainsaw Awards	Best Screenplay	Haunter	Nominated
