= Nothing (film) =

- Theatrical poster
- Directed by: Vincenzo Natali
- Screenplay by: Andrew Lowery; Andrew Miller
- Story by: Vincenzo Natali; Andrew Miller; David Hewlett
- Produced by: Steve Hoban
- Starring: David Hewlett; Andrew Miller
- Narrated by: Maurice Dean Wint
- Cinematography: Derek Rogers
- Edited by: Michele Conroy
- Music by: Michael Andrews
- Production company: 49th Parallel Productions
- Distributed by: Alliance Atlantis
- Release dates: September 9, 2003 (TIFF); December 7, 2004 (Canada)
- Running time: 90 minutes
- Country: Canada
- Language: English

Nothing is a 2003 Canadian surrealist comedy-drama film directed by Vincenzo Natali. It stars David Hewlett and Andrew Miller as friends who realize they can delete things from existence by hating them.

== Plot ==
A man named Dave is fired from his job after his girlfriend frames him for embezzlement. Meanwhile, his friend and housemate Andrew, an agoraphobic travel agent, is falsely accused of attempted child molestation, and their house is to be demolished by day's end. Both of them hide inside the house as police, city officials, and outraged neighbors surround it. Dave and Andrew open their front door and discover that the entire world beyond their house is gone, replaced with a featureless white void.

The nothingness surrounding them holds a flat, featureless, and somewhat springy surface. They set out across the empty plane to explore their new surroundings, leaving items behind as a means of getting back. After running out of items to leave as a trail, they lose track of their path. They eventually wander back home.

There, Andrew realizes that the house is out of food. Andrew glances around the room, eventually stopping and glaring at a noisy clock on the wall; it then disappears. Andrew drops a stack of overdue bills in front of Dave, and within seconds the bills disappear – they realize the clock, the bills, and the entire outside world have all disappeared because they were objects of their hate, and concentrating their hate on things somehow makes them disappear. Dave manages to hate away his need for food.

Dave still expresses some concern over Andrew's remaining phobias, questioning why the phobias still exist when there is nothing left to fear. Reluctantly, Andrew reveals that he was abused and tormented by his parents as a child. With some urging from Dave, he hates away the memory of each traumatic childhood event as he recounts it; when he is finally done he is no longer phobic and much more confident in himself. This change alters Andrew's personality and leads to friction between the friends, finally building into an outright confrontation. They decide that they can no longer share the same house, and opt to determine who keeps it by playing a match of their favorite fighting game. Dave loses, and is exiled with his possessions to reside out in the nothingness.

Things become tense with Dave's departure. Dave attempts to engage Andrew in conversation repeatedly, even performing the national anthem for his self-created nation (its borders marked by a line of his possessions), to no avail. Days later, Dave visits Andrew's house much happier; he has hated away his anger at Andrew. However, Andrew refuses to hate away his anger at Dave, quite content with his current emotions. Dave repeatedly hates away his anger as Andrew rebuffs and outright insults him, but his patience finally wears thin, leading Dave to hate away one of Andrew's possessions. Andrew retaliates by hating away one of Dave's possessions, and the situation escalates until everything including the house is hated away.

Dave walks away, assuming that the argument is finished, but falls over as his feet begin to disappear; Andrew is hating them away. He turns and retaliates, hating away Andrew's legs, and the situation escalates again until all that is left of the two are their disembodied heads. Refusing to give up the fight, Andrew and Dave turn themselves and (by bouncing) charge at each other, headbutting each other repeatedly until they finally stop, exhausted. They realize that they are unable to fully hate each other away and conclude that they must not really hate each other after all. Their anger abated, Dave and Andrew make up, agree to be best friends again, and set off to explore the nothingness. As they bounce away into the white void they remark how they both had always thought that their bodies were somehow holding them back.

Ten years later, (Note: In a post-credits scene.) an older Dave and Andrew – still disembodied heads – are sleeping when they are awakened by a popping sound, followed by a loud clamoring of voices and noise. As the unseen source of the clamoring gets louder and closer, the two scream.

== Cast ==
- David Hewlett as Dave
- Andrew Miller as Andrew
- Gordon Pinsent as Man In Suit
- Marie-Josée Croze as Sara
- Andrew Lowery as Crawford
- Elana Shilling as Little Girl
- Soo Garay as Little Girl's Mother
- Martin Roach as Co-worker
- Angelo Tsarouchas as Foreman
- Rick Parker as Mounted Police Officer
- Maurice Dean Wint as Narrator
- Bobby the Turtle as Stan

== Production ==
A lot of people said 'you can never make a movie set solely in one room' and they may have been right, but I did Cube. I made a movie called Nothing with only two characters set in a void, but that's what makes it exciting. The [possibility] of catastrophe is what makes making those movies so thrilling.

— Vincenzo Natali, Sky Movies HD

In an interview with Troy Riser of The Trades, director Vincenzo Natali described Nothing as "an experimental film" and called it "the comic flipside" of his earlier Cube. According to Natali, Cube and Nothing are the first two installments of "an informal trilogy of minimalist films," the third of which will be Echo Beach.

Natali, who considers Nothing "a story about friendship" at its core, originally envisioned Stan the turtle as the film's narrator. Due to budget constraints, however, the idea of a talking turtle could not be realized. Natali also associated Stan with a metaphorical significance: "He's a turtle because that's what David and Andrew are -- creatures who carry their home on their back and hide from the world."

In an email interview with Patrick Douglas of The Culture Shock, Natali attributed his desire to make Nothing to a fascination with the "notion of editing reality." He explained the decision to keep the leading actors' real names in the script as "creative bankruptcy."

David Hewlett, Andrew Miller and Natali grew up and went to high school together. In an interview with Ian Caddell of The Georgia Straight, Natali recalled how Hewlett and Miller had to enact many of the scenes in Nothing hanging from the ceiling on wires. But, he said, they enjoyed the abuse because they knew it could be the last opportunity the three would have to work together. In an interview with Jason Anderson of Eye Weekly, Hewlett, describing the suspension apparatus as a 30-foot atomic wedgie, commented, "[Natali]'d hang us from the ceiling like puppets and literally place us where he wanted us." Miller spoke of similar hardships: "It was really ridiculous."

Natali credited colleague Terry Gilliam as an influence to whom Nothing owes "a real debt."

The film features Squigglevision-like scenes produced by Head Gear Animation.

The premise of the film bears many similarities to the Twilight Zone episode The Mind and the Matter. As Natali's previous film Cube was said to be inspired by the Twilight Zone episode Five Characters in Search of an Exit, it is possible that this was a point of inspiration as well.

== Reception ==
Rotten Tomatoes, a review aggregator, reports that 50% of six surveyed critics gave the film a positive review; the average rating is 6/10.

Film critic Dan Schneider called Nothing "not a bad film", but "not good either", remarking that "its essential silliness and triviality are what keep this from reaching the existential level of a good The Twilight Zone episode, or something more akin to George Lucas's THX 1138." Schneider also criticized the soundtrack, arguing that "the film would have been much more effective if the music had suggested darker undertones." He concluded his review saying, "Nothing is one of those films that will stick with a viewer for a while, if only because it will leave scenarios open to be reworked in each viewer's mind."
