= Cypher (film) =

- Promotional movie poster
- Directed by: Vincenzo Natali
- Written by: Brian King
- Produced by: Paul Federbush; Wendy Grean; Casey La Scala; Hunt Lowry
- Starring: Jeremy Northam; Lucy Liu; Nigel Bennett; Timothy Webber
- Cinematography: Derek Rogers
- Edited by: Bert Kish
- Music by: Michael Andrews
- Distributed by: Pandora Cinema; Miramax Films
- Release date: August 2, 2002
- Running time: 95 minutes
- Country: Canada
- Language: English
- Budget: $7 million
- Box office: $898,365 (international only)

Cypher (also known as Brainstorm and Company Man) is a 2002 science fiction spy-fi thriller film directed by Vincenzo Natali and written by Brian King. The film follows an accountant (Jeremy Northam) whose sudden career as a corporate spy takes an unexpected turn when he meets a mysterious woman (Lucy Liu), uncovering secrets about the nature of his work. The film was shown in limited release in theaters in the US and Australia, and released on DVD on August 2, 2005. The film received mixed reviews, and Northam received the Best Actor award at the Sitges Film Festival.

== Plot ==
Recently unemployed accountant Morgan Sullivan is bored with his suburban life. Pressured by his wife to take a job with her father's company, he instead pursues a position in corporate espionage. Digicorp's Head of Security, Finster, inducts Morgan and assigns him a new identity. As Jack Thursby, he is sent to conventions to secretly record presentations and transmit them to headquarters. Sullivan is soon haunted by recurring nightmares and neck pain.

At a bar, Morgan meets Rita Foster from a competing corporation, who offers him pills and tells him not to transmit at the next convention. Afterward, Morgan is surprised when Digicorp confirms the receipt of his non-existent transmission. He takes the pills Rita gave him and his nightmares and pains stop. Confused and intrigued by Rita, he arranges to meet with her again. She tells him about Digicorp's deception and offers him an antidote – a green liquid in a large syringe. Morgan hesitantly accepts. She warns him that no matter what happens at the next convention he must not react.

Morgan discovers that all the convention attendees believe themselves to be Digicorp spies. While they are drugged from the served drinks, plastic-clad scientists probe, inject and brainwash them. Individual headsets reinforce their new identities, preparing them to be used and then disposed of. Morgan manages to convince Digicorp that he believes his new identity. He is then recruited by Sunway Systems, a rival of Digicorp. Sunway's Head of Security, Callaway, encourages Morgan to act as a double agent, feeding corrupted data to Digicorp. Morgan calls Rita, who warns him that Sunway is equally ruthless, and that he is in fact being used by Rita's boss, Sebastian Rooks. Morgan manages to steal the required information from Sunway Systems' vault, escaping with Rita's help.

Rita ultimately takes him to meet Rooks. When she temporarily leaves the room, a nervous Morgan calls Finster, and becomes even more distressed. He accidentally shoots Rita, who encourages him to ignore her and meet Rooks in the room next door. Morgan finds the room filled with objects which appear to be personal to him, including a photograph of him and Rita together. Realising that he is apparently Rooks, he turns to Rita in disbelief.

Before Rita can convince him, the apartment is invaded by armed men. Rita and Morgan escape to the roof of the skyscraper as the security teams of Digicorp and Sunway meet, led by Finster and Callaway. After a short Mexican standoff both sides realise they are after the same person, Sebastian Rooks, and rush to the roof, where they find Morgan and Rita in a helicopter. Rita cannot fly it, but, having designed it himself, Sebastian can after Rita encourages him to remember his past self, connecting through his love for her. He lifts off amid gunfire from the security teams. Finster and Callaway comment as the couple seem to have escaped:

Callaway: "Did you get a look at him? Did you see Rooks' face?"
Finster: "Just Morgan Sullivan, our pawn."

Looking up, they see the helicopter hovering and realise, too late, the true identity of Morgan Sullivan. Sebastian triggers a bomb, causing the whole roof to explode. On a boat in the South Pacific Ocean, Sebastian reveals the content of the stolen disc to Rita. Marked "terminate with extreme prejudice", it is the last copy of Rita's identity (after the one in the vault was destroyed). Sebastian throws the disc into the sea and says, "Now there's no copy at all."

== Cast ==
- Jeremy Northam as Morgan Sullivan and Jack Thursby
- Lucy Liu as Rita Foster
- Nigel Bennett as Finster
- Timothy Webber as Callaway
- David Hewlett as Virgil Dunn
- Kari Matchett as Diane Thursby
- Kristina Nicoll as Amy Sullivan
- Boyd Banks as Fred Garfield
- Marcus Hutchings as Jamison
- Denis Akiyama as speaker at the Omaha convention

== Reception ==
The film received mixed reviews. On the review aggregator website Rotten Tomatoes, 59% of 17 critics' reviews are positive.

Derek Elley of Variety called the film "consistently intriguing" and "100% plot driven" with excellent performances from the cast, while BBC's Neil Smith compared Cypher to The Manchurian Candidate, and noticed feelings of tension and claustrophobia, as in Natali's directorial début Cube, finally concluding that "Natali seeps [sic] his yarn in an Orwellian atmosphere of paranoia." Scott Weinberg, reviewing for DVD Talk, recommended the film, calling it "one of the best direct-to-video titles [he has] seen all year", noting similarities to The Matrix, Dark City and the works of Philip K. Dick. English horror fiction writer and journalist Kim Newman, writing for the Empire magazine, awarded the film 4 out of 5 stars, praising Northam's and Liu's performances and calling the film a "semi-science-fictional exercise in puzzle-setting and solving".

Some critics found problems with the film's complex narrative. Paul Byrnes of The Sydney Morning Herald found that the plot overwhelmed the characters so much that he "stopped caring". John J. Puccio, writing for Movie Metropolis, thought that "[Cypher's] corporate espionage plot doesn't prove simply too complicated, it ends up downright muddled", but concluded that the film was nevertheless "still kind of fun".

For his performance in Cypher, Jeremy Northam received the Best Actor award on the 2002 Sitges Film Festival in Catalonia.
