= Imaginary Bitches =

- Created by: Andrew Miller
- Directed by: Andrew Miller
- Starring: Eden Riegel; Brooke Nevin; Elizabeth Hendrickson; Connie Fletcher-Staton
- Ending theme: "Not Alone" by Ben Harrison
- Country of origin: United States
- Original language: English
- No. of episodes: 13

Production
- Executive producer: Andrew Miller
- Producers: Seth Adam Cohen; Judson Pearce Morgan
- Editor: Tatiana S. Riegel
- Running time: 5–7 minutes

Original release
- Release: May 2 – August 15, 2008

Imaginary Bitches is a web series created by Andrew Miller that premiered on May 2, 2008. It comprises thirteen short webisodes released on its website and YouTube.

== Overview ==
The series tells the story of a single girl who deals with the lonely reality that all her friends are in serious relationships by creating imaginary friends to talk to. But, as Edie explains: "They're not really my friends; they're horrible bitches."

The show stars Eden Riegel, Elizabeth Hendrickson, Brooke Nevin and Connie Fletcher-Staton. Guest stars include Michael Traynor, Jessalyn Gilsig, Aaron Staton, Greg Rikaart, James Kee, Chandra West, Brittany Ishibashi, Sam Page, Charlie Koznick, and Billy Aaron Brown.

Imaginary Bitches episodes have been viewed over 4 million times. In May 2008, Imaginary Bitches became a YouTube Partner, allowing the creators of the show to share revenue from advertising on YouTube video pages.

The show is something of a family affair. Show creator Andrew Miller is married to lead actress Eden Riegel. Riegel's half-sister, Tatiana S. Riegel, edits the episodes, and her brother, Sam Riegel, co-wrote episode 6 and sound edited episodes one and two. Quyen Tran, the cinematographer, is Sam Riegel's wife.

== Characters ==
=== Eden and friends ===
Eden (Eden Riegel): The protagonist of the series. She is slightly self-conscious and extremely lonely due to all of her friends being in relationships. She also has difficulty finding and keeping a boyfriend. She creates the Bitches to have someone to talk to. Her enemies are Brittany, who stole her boyfriend, and Jessalyn, who backstabbed her. She unsuccessfully attempted therapy. One of her favorite shows appears to be Grey's Anatomy, she plays a game with The Bitches where whenever someone says "Seriously" they have to eat a piece of chocolate.

Lizzie (Elizabeth Hendrickson): One of Eden's oldest friends, she appears to be perky and very friendly, as well as being open minded to Eden's single-ness. She has a forgetful boyfriend named Jake. In one episode, she breaks up with him after he reacts badly to her thoughts about weddings; however, she calls him in the end. In the same episode, she has an imaginary wedding in a way similar to the bitches but on a larger scale.

Brooke (Brooke Nevin): Appears to be Eden's closest friend. She considers herself to be very supportive of Eden, and helps her when they run into an old nemesis and sets her up with her shrink. She was the first of Eden's friends to learn about the Bitches, as well as the first to intervene. Her boyfriend Michael is extremely well organized, which sometimes bothers her.

Connie (Connie Fletcher-Staton): Eden's most promiscuous friend. She sets Eden up with a man from her office. She prefers not using condoms (citing it as her favorite thing about no longer being single) and has had sex dressed as Catwoman. Her priest is a former porn star.

=== The bitches ===
Initially created to be friends to talk to, they quickly developed mean personalities. Though Eden is the only one able to see them they have communicated with Brittany. Although they appear to be best friends they also constantly are at each other's throats.

Catherine: The first bitch, Catherine is the meaner of the two. She can be very greedy, shown when she demanded twice the salary of the cast of Desperate Housewives. She is described by Heather as being snobby. She dislikes Dr. Kee, refusing to even enter his office although he falls in lust with her. She compares Eden's friends to the Pod People when they attempt to set her up with the perfect guy.

Heather: The nicer, if more promiscuous bitch. She is described by Eden as being around 5'4", with dirty blonde hair, wide green eyes, and pouty lips. Catherine calls her an anorexic whore. Eden says everything about her is perky. She has an infatuation with bald men, and wants to have sex with Dr. Kee because of his baldness. She would like to have sex with the entire cast of The CW (both male and female), the Jonas Brothers, and Hannah Montana. She has a sexual fantasy involving baseball. Mark's avatar Brett almost hooks up with her.

Jennifer: The nicest bitch, she is actually a lesbian, and falls in love with Eden.

=== Enemies ===
Jessalyn (Jessalyn Gilsig): Eden's nemesis. She appears to dislike non-single people, and invites Eden to a singles party. Although she at first appears to be friendly, she quickly becomes a bitch. According to Heather she has an imaginary friend who thinks she's "psycho." She winds up being a lesbian and ruins Eden's attempt at lesbian dating by hooking up with Eden's date.

Brittany (Brittany Ishibashi): A wannabe Guru and yoga instructor and failed actress. She had stolen Eden's boyfriend, but now wishes forgiveness. Catherine and Heather appear to her (the only time someone beside Eden has directly communicated with them) and trick her into confessing to be a fake.

=== Men ===
Waiter Guy (Michael Traynor): A waiter who Eden sleeps with. The relationship seems to be going well, but when she has no one to talk to about the night before, Eden creates Catherine. They break up after Catherine insults Waiter Guy.

Bruce (Aaron Staton): A man at Jessalyn's singles party. Although Jessalyn promised him to Eden, she later uses her knowledge of the Bitches to take him. He calls Jessalyn "a sexy Mother Teresa."

Mark (Greg Rikaart): A Second Life fanatic who works with Connie. He was set up with Eden because of their mutual imaginary worlds. He attempts to hook his alter-ego Brett up with Heather. Eden breaks up with him after he tries to masturbate to a Heather avatar that Mark created after hearing a description of Heather and her fantasies.

Dr. James Kee (James Kee): Brooke's shrink and the author of #1 bestselling self-help book, "Your Psyche Has a Secret." Catherine hates him, refusing to enter his office. Heather flirts with him, due to her attraction to bald men. He soon proves to be crazy after becoming infatuated with Catherine and even trying to have sex with her.

Father Grant (Charlie Koznick): Connie's priest. He is an ex-porn star who attempts to rid Eden of the bitches by having sex with her, apparently the plot of one of his movies.

== Episodes ==
No. in series	Title	Written by	Original release date
1	"It's Not Easy Making Imaginary New Friends"	Andrew Miller	May 2, 2008
When her friends are too busy with their boyfriends to hear about Eden's amazing date, Eden (Eden Riegel) creates an imaginary friend named Catherine to listen too her. Unfortunately Catherine doesn't just listen, she talks back. And says things that Eden doesn't want to hear.
2	"The Dirtier Isn't Always the Better"	Andrew Miller	May 9, 2008
When Eden's Friend Lizzie (Elizabeth Hendrickson) doesn't invite her to a "couples-only" dinner party, Catherine appears and argues that Lizzie is a terrible friend. Eden creates another imaginary friend, Heather, to defend her.
3	"Where Were You When Eden Got Drunk and Puked All Over Me and Lizzie?"	Andrew Miller	May 16, 2008
When Brooke (Brooke Nevin) learns about Eden's imaginary friends she decides to take on the bitches in order to win back her best friend.
4	"A New Leper in the Colony"	Andrew Miller	May 23, 2008
Eden is very excited when she is invited to a singles party, only to learn that real girls can be bitches, too. In this episode we are introduced to Jessalyn (Jessalyn Gilsig), Eden's nemesis.
5	"It's Totally What You think"	Andrew Miller	May 30, 2008
Eden's friend Connie (Connie Fletcher-Staton) sets her up with a guy from her office, Mark (Greg Rikaart), who has an imaginary life of his own. But the date ends badly when Eden and Mark's imaginary worlds collide.
6	"Help Dr. James Help You"	Sam Riegel & Andrew Miller	June 6, 2008
Eden hopes a session with Brooke's shrink (played by James Kee) will help her with her imaginary problems... but sadly, Dr. Kee seems to have an even weaker grasp on reality than she does.
7	"A Spiritual Bitch Bath"	Andrew Miller	June 13, 2008
Eden and Brooke attend a yoga class taught by spiritual guru wanna-be Brittany (Brittany Ishibashi), who just so happens to be the girl who stole Eden's ex-boyfriend. But Brittany learns that payback's a bitch when Catherine and Heather expose her as a fraud.
8	"Sexy Secret Santa"	Bo Price & Andrew Miller	July 11, 2008
When Brooke finds out that Eden and her imaginary friends are doing Secret Santa in July, she feels guilty for having left Eden out of the girls' "couples-only" gift exchange last Christmas. But when Brooke, Lizzie and Connie crash Eden's imaginary holiday party, the bitches have a plan to make Eden's real friends disappear.
9	"Porn Star Priest"	Jeff Poliquin	July 18, 2008
Connie introduces Eden to her very sexy priest (played by Charlie Koznik) and hopes that he can "exorcise" her imaginary demons. But his technique is unconventional, and his past downright seedy.
10	"Imaginary Bridezilla"	Andrew Miller	July 25, 2008
Lizzie is depressed after breaking up with her boyfriend, but she finds something better than vodka to ease her sorrow: the wedding of her dreams. Too bad it's all in her head!
11	"Only Crazy Girls Queef"	Kathryn Price & Nichole Millard	August 1, 2008
Eden thinks that she has finally met Mr. Right, but when he doesn't call her she turns to the bitches to help her find out why. Turns out he was willing to overlook that quife... Breaking and entering? Not so much.
12	"Three Bitches is an Imaginary Crowd (Part I)"	Andrew Miller	August 8, 2008
Eden creates a dating profile on Match.com with the help of a new imaginary friend, Jennifer, who, unlike Catherine and Heather, seems to think Eden is perfect just the way she is. But when Jennifer makes sexual advances towards her, Eden wonders if her imagination is telling her she should be playing for the other team... or at least dating them.
13	"Three Bitches is an Imaginary Crowd (Part II)"	Andrew Miller	August 15, 2008
In the season finale Eden decides to go on a date with a sexy lady she meets at the gym. At dinner they flirt, they share deep, dark secrets, things are going great. So what bitch could possibly ruin Eden's first promising date? This time she's not even of the imaginary variety. She's as real as she is bitchy.

== Eden's Europe Vlog ==
Ten vlogs were made chronicling Eden (the actress, as opposed to the character) in Europe with Catherine and Heather. The reason for the trip was a hiatus caused by re-negotiations of the bitches' contracts, which nearly resulted in them being replaced, going as far as Andrew sending Eden audition videos for replacements.

A video setting the vlogs up was also made, as a press conference. It is implied during these videos that Heather is bisexual and somewhat of an ephebophile; as part of the contract she requests sex with male and female actors on The CW, as well as teenagers The Jonas Brothers and Hannah Montana.

== In the media ==
- On April 30, 2008, soap news website DaytimeConfidential.com posted an article about Imaginary Bitches, and included an interview with series lead Eden Riegel. Since the show's premiere, Daytime Confidential blogger Jamey Giddens has posted a weekly review of new episodes.
- The day before the premiere of Imaginary Bitches, May 1, 2008, Michael Starr mentioned the series in his column "Starr Report" in the New York Post.
- On May 6, 2008, Canadian website Sweetspot.ca, which calls itself "Canada's Sweetest Lifestyle Guide", posted an entry about Imaginary Bitches recommending the series as something of interest to Sweetspot subscribers while they awaited the opening of the film Sex and the City: The Movie.
- Entertainment Tonight Canada (ET Canada) aired a segment on Imaginary Bitches on May 29, 2008, which included behind-the-scenes footage of the cast and crew on set filming new episodes. Andrew Miller, Jessalyn Gilsig and Eden Riegel were interviewed. ET Canada featured Imaginary Bitches because several members of the cast and crew (Andrew Miller, Jeff Poliquin, Brooke Nevin, Jessalyn Gilsig, Chandra West, and James Kee) are Canadian-born.
- On June 3, 2008, TV Guide Canada named Imaginary Bitches one of its "Top 3 Shows to Watch" in the soap column "The Nelson Ratings" by Nelson Branco.
- In the June 30, 2008, issue of Us Weekly magazine, Imaginary Bitches made a list of "The Web's Big Hits".
- TV Guide's June 30 – July 13 double issue featured a review of Imaginary Bitches written by Michael Logan. In the review Logan raved, "You're a damn fool if you're not watching Imaginary Bitches!", and went on to call the show, "Fresh, randy and pee-your-pants funny." Logan proclaimed: "Bitches isn't just great. It's Sex and the City great."
- On July 25, 2008, the online edition of People Magazine mentioned Imaginary Bitches in its TV Roundup section.
- The website of TV's The Insider featured an exclusive interview with Imaginary Bitches' Eden Riegel on July 25, 2008. The interview was originally conducted by the entertainment blog Allie is Wired.

== Awards ==
Imaginary Bitches took part in the 2008 Portable Film Festival and was chosen winner in the "Look at Me" category for online webisodes and video blogging.

On December 24, 2008, TV Guide Canada announced its Second Annual Soap Opera Spirit Award Nominations. Imaginary Bitches received 5 nominations: Outstanding Ensemble, Outstanding Performance in a Podcast/Webisode/Soap-related Series (Eden Riegel and Elizabeth Hendrickson), Outstanding Guest Star (Greg Rikaart), and for Outstanding Podcast/Webisode/Soap-related Non-daytime Series (creator Andrew Miller). The winners were announced January 21, 2009 on TVGuide.ca. Imaginary Bitches took home awards for Outstanding Podcast/Webisode/Soap-related Non-daytime Series and for Eden Riegel for Outstanding Performance in a Podcast/Webisode/Soap-related Series.

On April 14, 2009, the 13th annual Webby Award nominations were announced. Riegel was nominated for her work on Imaginary Bitches in the best individual performance category. Miller received an official honoree selection for best writing. Riegel was announced on May 5, 2009, as the winner of the best individual performance people's voice award. Her acceptance speech, which was limited to five words, was: "I'm sleeping with the director."

In 2009, Imaginary Bitches was nominated for a Daytime Emmy Award in the New Approaches-Daytime Entertainment category.
