= Eden Riegel =

American actress (born 1981)

- Riegel at Animate! Philadelphia in 2026
- Born: Eden Sonja Jane Riegel; January 1, 1981 (age 45); Washington, D.C., U.S.
- Occupation: Actress
- Years active: 1992–present
- Spouse: Andrew Miller (m. 2007)
- Children: 2
- Relatives: Tatiana S. Riegel (half-sister); Sam Riegel (brother)

Eden Sonja Jane Riegel (born January 1, 1981) is an American actress. She portrayed Bianca Montgomery in the daytime drama All My Children, and propelled the character into a gay icon, as well as a popular figure within the medium. Nominated previously on multiple occasions, she received a Daytime Emmy Award for the role in 2005.

In addition to her work on All My Children, Riegel has guest starred in several prime time shows, as well as film, and starred as character "Eden" in the web series Imaginary Bitches. She assumed the role of Heather Stevens on The Young and the Restless from April 2010 to November 2011.

Riegel is also a prolific voice actress, providing the voices for many video games and animated projects. She is the voice director for Disney's animated TV series Amphibia, The Owl House, The Ghost and Molly McGee, Hailey's On It!, Zombies: The Re-Animated Series, Primos and Kiff (alongside her brother Sam Riegel).

== Early life ==
Born to Kurt and Lenore Riegel on New Year's Day 1981 in Washington, D.C., Riegel was raised in a Virginia suburb and became interested in acting while watching her brother, Sam, perform dinner theater, which she later joined in for $10 a week. Her big break came when she won the role of Cosette in Les Misérables, leading to other roles on and off-Broadway. She graduated from the Professional Children's School and attended Harvard University, with ambitions to become a lawyer, but later left the institution. In 2000, she served as an intern at the White House for the summer.

== Career ==
=== All My Children ===
From July 2000 to February 2005, Riegel portrayed the role of Bianca Montgomery on the American ABC soap opera All My Children; Bianca was the daughter of the show's central character, Erica Kane. During the 2004-2005 baby switch storyline, when Bianca's daughter is kidnapped and switched with the son of Babe Carey Chandler (Alexa Havins), Riegel also portrayed Bianca on fellow ABC soap opera One Life to Live.

In December 2000, Riegel's character Bianca "came out" to her mother, Erica Kane (Susan Lucci), becoming the only lesbian on a daytime soap opera at that time. In 2003, the kiss between Bianca and character Lena Kundera (Olga Sosnovska) made history when it became the first lesbian kiss to appear on American daytime television. In 2005, Bianca shared a kiss with close friend and confidante Maggie Stone (Elizabeth Hendrickson), making TV Guide's list of best same-sex kisses on television. Riegel's character was awarded the first Gay & Lesbian Alliance Against Defamation award for "Favorite OUT Image of the Year" in 2004. Lesbianation.com, self-proclaimed as the leading online community for lesbians, voted Eden Riegel as Number 7 on their top ten list of Women We Love: The Ladies of June '06, stating, "We were swamped with requests to add All My Children hottie Eden Riegel to our list this month — and here she is!"

Riegel was nominated for three Daytime Emmy Awards for Outstanding Younger Actress in a Drama Series (2001, 2002, 2004) and won the award in 2005. She also won two Soap Opera Digest Awards in 2001 for Outstanding Female Newcomer. Later that year, Riegel, along with best friend and co-star Elizabeth Hendrickson, exited All My Children, with their last show airing on February 24, 2005. Riegel then moved to Los Angeles, California, to pursue other acting ventures. She made a brief return to the soap opera when Bianca's mother (Erica) married in May 2005, and returned for an extended stay from December 16, 2005, to January 10, 2006. Bianca's daughter, Miranda, was aged accordingly. Riegel returned again for a short visit from May 24, 2006, until mid-June, in a storyline connected with Bianca's sister Kendall's (Alicia Minshew) pregnancy and coma. In August 2006, Riegel's return to All My Children as a contract player was announced. The actress taped her first scenes on September 12, which first aired on October 11. Riegel commuted back and forth between her home and family in Los Angeles and New York, where All My Children tapes. In 2007, she parted ways with the show once again, but reappeared in the episode dated August 14, 2007, when Bianca phones in to check on Kendall from Paris, and in December for a Christmas visit.

In 2008, Riegel agreed to return to All My Children with Tamara Braun. Braun came on as Reese Williams, Bianca's new lover/girlfriend and later wife. Bianca first aired on October 17, 2008. Reese followed on October 30, 2008. Riegel's return was partly to minimize the effect of Alicia Minshew's absence on the show while Minshew took a two-month hiatus to get married. Reese and Bianca's union made history when it resulted in the first legal same-sex marriage in American daytime television. Riegel left the show again in February 2009, but also confirmed in an interview with Soap Opera Digest that she would be returning in spring 2009 to conclude the Reese and Bianca story.

In 2010, Riegel returned for a short-term stint for All My Children's 40th anniversary. The character had been cited as too iconic to recast, but in 2010, Riegel decided to permanently exit the role, and plans to recast were subsequently confirmed. However, on February 22, 2013, it was announced that Riegel would be reprising her role as Bianca in guest-arc on the Prospect Park's brief continuation of All My Children.

=== Other projects ===
Prior to joining All My Children, Riegel had a small role on the daytime drama As the World Turns as an AIDS patient, appeared in Law & Order and portrayed a minor character in the feature film American Pie. She sang and did voice acting work in the film The Prince of Egypt. She has also done some voicework for animated TV shows like Stitch! and Bleach. While portraying Bianca, she remained active in other acting avenues, doing a small guest role on American Dreams and appearing in the New York play The Sex Lives of Superheroes.

In 2008, Riegel joined the cast of Year One, a Harold Ramis film that stars Jack Black and Michael Cera. The film is a comedy set during biblical times that follows two men as they wander through civilization and It was released in June 2009.

Eden and her brother, Sam Riegel, both voiced characters in the 2012 Vita port of Persona 4 Golden, voicing the characters of Marie and Teddie, respectively.

In 2008, Riegel starred in the web series Imaginary Bitches, portraying the role of "Eden", a single girl who deals with the lonely reality that her best friends are all in serious relationships by creating some imaginary friends...who turn out to be total bitches. The show is edited by Eden's half-sister Tatiana S. Riegel, written by brother Sam Riegel, and was created by Andrew Miller. In 2010, Riegel took over the role of Heather Stevens on The Young and the Restless. She also guest-starred on ABC's Castle, portraying the distraught sister of a man who is killed in the episode.

In 2025, Riegel voiced Guinevere, an android princess, in Knights of Guinevere, produced by independent animation studio Glitch Productions. On social media she called the production "astonishing" and a "wild ride", and said it was "gonna knock your socks off!" The pilot was co-created by Dana Terrace, Zach Marcus, and John Bailey Owen, who had worked together on The Owl House. In that series, she voiced Boscha and other characters, from 2020 to 2023.

She also voiced characters in other Disney series, such as Amphibia, The Ghost and Molly McGee, Hailey's On It!, Zombies: The Re-Animated Series, and Primos. She also was a voice director on Zombies: The Re-Animated Series, Star Wars: Young Jedi Adventures, five episodes of Kiff, and five other animated series: The Wonderfully Weird World of Gumball, Hailey's On It!, The Ghost and Molly McGee, The Owl House, and Amphibia. Riegel has received nominations at the Children's and Family Emmy Awards for the "Outstanding Voice Directing for an Animated Series" category for Amphibia in 2022, The Ghost and Molly McGee in 2023, and Star Wars: Young Jedi Adventures in 2025.

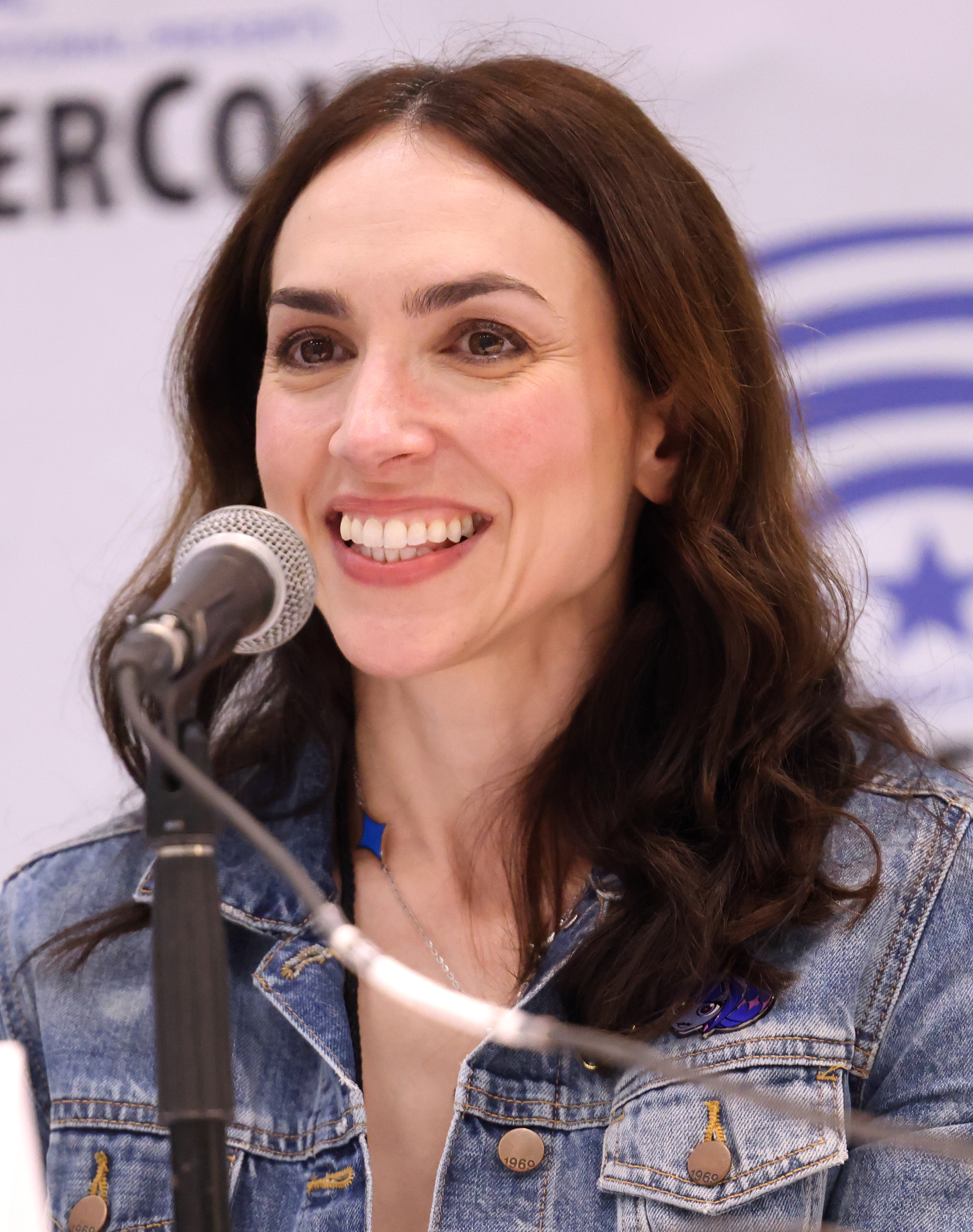
Riegel talking at Wondercon

== Personal life ==
Her older brother, Sam, is a voice actor and voice director in various animated shows and video games, and her half-sister, Tatiana (known as "Tanya" to friends and family), is an Oscar-nominated film editor for various television shows and films. Eden discussed the portrayal of Bianca with Tatiana, who is a lesbian, and with the producers of All My Children, in order to ensure that the character was not a stereotype.

In March 2007, Riegel became engaged to actor Andrew Miller, who had been a high school classmate of Cameron Mathison's (Ryan Lavery on All My Children). Miller and Riegel married on September 30, 2007, and their first son, Jack Oscar Miller, was born on May 21, 2011. In June 2013, Riegel announced on Twitter that she was expecting her second child, a boy. Her second son, Henry Isaac Miller, was born on December 20, 2013.

Riegel is a fan of the Toronto Maple Leafs, and is a close friend of actresses Rebecca Budig, Alicia Minshew, and Elizabeth Hendrickson.

== Filmography ==
=== Films ===
Year	Title	Role	Notes	Ref.
1992	Home Alone 2: Lost in New York	Choir Member	Uncredited role	
1994	The Frog King	Princess	Short Film	
1996	Duo	Joan		
1999	Henry Hill	Nicole Hill		
1999	American Pie	Sarah		
2001	Semmelweis	Elisabeth	Short Film	
2009	Year One	Lilith		
2012	Trauma Team	Taylor Ruske		
2013	The Morning After	Lisa	Short Film	
2014	Teacher of the Year	Jackie Campbell		
2016	ISRA 88	Mary Anderson		
2018	Living Room Coffin	Polly		

List of voice performances in films
Year	Title	Role	Notes	Ref.
1993	Peppermint Rose	Unknown	Voice role Special	
1993	Richard Scarry's Best Busy People Video Ever!	Unknown	Voice role Released straight-to-video	
1993	Richard Scarry's Best Learning Songs Video Ever!	Unknown	Voice role Released straight-to-video	
1994	Richard Scarry's Best Silly Stories and Songs Video Ever	Unknown	Voice role Released straight-to-video	
1994	Richard Scarry's Best Sing Along Mother Goose Video Ever	Unknown	Voice role Released straight-to-video	
1998	The Prince of Egypt	Young Miriam	Voice role	
2003	Azumi	Azumi	Voice role English dub	
2006	Azumi 2: Death or Love	Azumi	Voice role English dub	
2013	Naruto Shippuden the Movie: The Lost Tower	Queen Sara, Sara's Daughter	Voice role English dub	
2015	Tiger & Bunny: The Rising	Kaede Kaburagi	Voice role English dub	
2015	The Lion Guard: Return of the Roar	Kiara	Voice role Television film	
2017	The Lion Guard: The Rise of Scar	Kiara	Voice role Television film	
2018	Sailor Moon S: The Movie	Himeko Nayotake	Voice role English dub Viz Media Version	

=== Television ===
List of live-action acting performances on television and related media
Year	Title	Role	Notes	Ref.
1995-1997	New York Undercover	Meghan Cooper	Episode: "Digital Underground"; Episode: "The Solomon Papers"	
1997	Law & Order	Natalie	Episode: "Mad Dog"	
2000–2013	All My Children	Bianca Montgomery	(Role from: July 2000 - February 2005; May 2005; December 2005 - January 2006; May 2006; October 2006 - April 2007; August 2007; December 2007; October 17, 2008 - February 24, 2009; April 24, 2009 - April 29, 2009; January 5, 2010; April 29, 2013 - July 15, 2013)	
2004	American Dreams	Protestor	Episode: "Shoot the Moon"	
2004–2005	One Life to Live	Bianca Montgomery	3 episodes	
2010	Castle	Rachel Goldstein	Episode: "Punked"	
2010–2011	The Young and the Restless	Heather Stevens	April 20, 2010 – November 4, 2011	
2012	NCIS	Meredith Bilson	Episode: "The Good Son"	
2014	Hawaii Five-0	FBI Analyst Katie Halinan	Episode: "Pe'epe'e Kanaka"	
2014	Criminal Minds	Shelley Hicks	Episode: "A Thousand Suns"	
2015	Rizzoli & Isles	Florence Reynolds	Episode: "In Plain View"	
2016	NCIS: Los Angeles	Dr. Iris Miller	Episode: "Crazy Train"	
2017	One Day at a Time	Lucy	Episode: "Quinces"	
2018	A.P. Bio	Katie	Episode: "Dating Toledoans"	
2021	Sydney to the Max	Rabbi Feller	Episode: "The Bat Mitzvah Planner"	

List of voice performances in television and direct-to-video
Year	Title	Role	Notes	Ref.
2002	Samurai Deeper Kyo	Sakuya	English dub as Sonja Lingo/Eden Regal	
2004	DearS	B-Ko	English dub as Jane Lingo	
2009–2016	Stitch!	Yuna Kamihara	English dub	
2010–2011	Bleach	Rurichiyō Kasumiōji	English dub	
2011	Marvel Anime: Iron Man	Nanami Ota	English dub	
2012–2013, 2022	Tiger & Bunny	Kaede Kaburagi	English dub	
2015	Sailor Moon R	Kōan	English dub Viz dub; Credited as Claudia Lenz	
2015	Fresh Beat Band of Spies	Spooky Spooks	Episode: "Ghost of Rock"; Credited as Eden Riegel Miller	
2016–2019	The Lion Guard	Kiara	10 episodes	
2016	Sailor Moon Crystal	Kōan	Episode: "Infiltration -Sailor Mars-"; English dub Credited as Claudia Lenz	
2019–2022	Amphibia	Additional Voices	dialogue director	
2020–2023	The Owl House	Boscha / Additional Voices	dialogue director	
2020–2021	Kinderwood		Casting director/assistant dialogue director/dialogue director	
2020	Santiago of the Seas		Voice director ("A Pirate Christmas")	
2021–2024	The Ghost and Molly McGee	Kat / Additional Voices	dialogue director	
2021–2021	Archibald's Next Big Thing Is Here!		Voice director (6 episodes)	
2021–2022	Trolls: TrollsTopia		Voice director (11 episodes)	
2022–2023	Interrupting Chicken		Voice director	
2023–2025	Star Wars: Young Jedi Adventures		Voice director	
2023	Kiff		Voice director (5 episodes)	
2023–2024	Hailey's On It!	Olga	Dialogue director	
2024–2026	Zombies: The Re-Animated Series	Razzy	Dialogue director	
2024–2025	Primos	N.K. Scheinhorn / Caroline Malfeo / Additional Voices	Dialogue director	
2025–present	The Wonderfully Weird World of Gumball		Voice director: USA	
2025–present	The Sisters Grimm		Voiceover director	

=== Video games ===
List of performances in video games
Year	Title	Role	Notes	Ref.
2008	Tales of Vesperia	Estellise Sidos Heurassein		
2009	Star Ocean: Second Evolution	Rena Lanford	Credited as Claudia Lenz	
2009	Final Fantasy XIII	Cocoon Inhabitants		
2009	Dead or Alive Paradise	Hitomi	Shared with Hynden Walch	
2009	Naruto Shippuden: Dragon Blade Chronicles	Akari Tatsuhiro	English dub	
2010	Nier	Devola / Popola	Uncredited	
2011	Dead or Alive: Dimensions	Hitomi		
2011	Marvel Super Hero Squad: Comic Combat	Squirrel Girl		
2012	Call of Duty: Black Ops II	Josefina Menendez / Jane McKnight		
2012	Resident Evil: Operation Raccoon City	Sherry Birkin		
2012	Resident Evil 6	Sherry Birkin		
2012	Persona 4 Golden	Marie		
2012	Soulcalibur V	Credited as Claudia Lenz		
2013	Disgaea D2	Sicily		
2013	Fire Emblem Awakening	Sumia		
2013	Shin Megami Tensei IV	Isabeau		
2013	Saints Row IV	Jane Austen	Serves as narrator for the game	
2014	Final Fantasy X / X-2 HD Remaster	Chuami	Final Fantasy X -Will- Audio Drama	
2014	Guilty Gear Xrd	May		
2015	Saints Row: Gat out of Hell	Jane Austen / Demons		
2015	Lord of Magna: Maiden Heaven	Charlotte	Credited as Claudia Lenz	
2015	Xenoblade Chronicles X	Ryyz		
2016	Star Ocean: Integrity and Faithlessness	Miki Sauvester		
2016	World of Final Fantasy	Hauynn / Masked Woman		
2016	Final Fantasy XV	Iris Amicitia		
2016	Persona 5	Hifumi Togo		
2017	Nier: Automata	Devola / Popola	as Claudia Lenz	
2017	Fire Emblem Heroes	Genny / Kana (female)	as Claudia Lenz	
2017	The Legend of Heroes: Trails of Cold Steel II	Duvalie The Swift		
2018	Monster Hunter: World	The Handler		
2019	Fire Emblem: Three Houses	Fleche von Bergliez	Credited as Eden Miller	
2019	Catherine	Anna Rosmont		
2019	Monster Hunter: World - Iceborne	The Handler		
2020	Persona 5 Royal	Hifumi Togo		
2020	Crash Bandicoot 4: It's About Time	Coco Bandicoot, Fake Coco	Replacing Debi Derryberry	
2020	Yakuza: Like a Dragon	Eri Kamataki		
2020	Fallout 76: Steel Dawn	Tally Lang	In-game credits	
2020	The Legend of Heroes: Trails of Cold Steel IV	Duvalie The Swift	Credited as Claudia Lenz	
2021	Persona 5 Strikers	Additional Voices		
2021	Nier Replicant ver.1.22474487139...	Devola / Popola	In-game credits	
2021	Guilty Gear -STRIVE-	May		
2021	Cookie Run: Kingdom	Princess Cookie		
2022	Fire Emblem Warriors: Three Hopes	Fleche von Bergliez	Credited as Claudia Lenz	
2023	Mato Anomalies	Butterfly, Cheyne	In-game credits	
2023	The Legend of Heroes: Trails into Reverie	Duvalie The Swift		
2024	Like a Dragon: Infinite Wealth	Additional voices		
2024	Granblue Fantasy: Relink	Additional voices		
2025	Like a Dragon: Pirate Yakuza in Hawaii	Additional voices		
2026	Resident Evil Requiem	Sherry Birkin		

=== Web series ===
List of acting performances in web series
Year	Title	Role	Notes	Ref.
2008	Imaginary Bitches	Eden	13 episodes	
2025	Wildemount Wildlings	Sky Bloodforge	3-episode actual play limited series	
2025–present	Knights of Guinevere	Guinevere "Gwen"		
TBA	Strawberry Vampire	Nancy's Mom		

== Awards and nominations ==
Year	Award	Category	Nominee(s)	Result	Ref.
2001	Soap Opera Digest Award	Outstanding Female Newcomer for All My Children	Eden Riegel	Won	
2001	Daytime Emmy Award	Outstanding Younger Actress in a Drama Series for All My Children	Eden Riegel	Nominated	
2002	Daytime Emmy Award	Outstanding Younger Actress in a Drama Series for All My Children	Eden Riegel	Nominated	
2004	GLAAD Media Award	Favorite OUT Image of the Year Award for All My Children	Eden Riegel	Won	
2004	Daytime Emmy Award	Outstanding Younger Actress in a Drama Series for All My Children	Eden Riegel	Nominated	
2005	Daytime Emmy Award	Outstanding Younger Actress in a Drama Series for All My Children	Eden Riegel	Won	
2005	Soap Opera Digest Award	Outstanding Younger Lead Actress for All My Children	Eden Riegel	Won	
2009	Daytime Emmy Award	New Approaches - Daytime Entertainment for Imaginary Bitches	Eden Riegel	Nominated	
2009	Webby Awards	Best Individual Performance People's Voice Award for Imaginary Bitches	Eden Riegel	Won	
2022	Children's and Family Emmy Awards	Outstanding Voice Directing for an Animated Series for Amphibia	Eden Riegel	Nominated	
2023	Children's and Family Emmy Awards	Outstanding Voice Directing for an Animated Series for The Ghost and Molly McGee	Eden Riegel	Nominated	
2024	Children's and Family Emmy Awards	Outstanding Voice Directing for an Animated Series for Star Wars: Young Jedi Adventures	Eden Riegel	Nominated	

== See also ==
- Bianca Montgomery and Maggie Stone
- Lena Kundera and Bianca Montgomery
- Reese Williams and Bianca Montgomery
- Supercouple
