= Oh, What a Night (1992 film) =

1992 drama film directed by Eric Till

- Directed by: Eric Till
- Written by: Richard Nielsen
- Produced by: Peter R. Simpson
- Starring: Corey Haim; Barbara Williams; Robbie Coltrane; Emilie-Claire Barlow; Andrew Miller
- Music by: Ian Thomas
- Distributed by: Green Productions
- Release date: 1992
- Running time: 93 minutes
- Country: Canada
- Language: English

Oh, What a Night is a 1992 comedy film, starring Corey Haim and Barbara Williams.

== Plot ==
Two teenage boys are growing up in a small Canadian town in the summer of 1955. While their parents go about with their own concerns, the two develop an interest in girls. One tries to impress his crush with his father's cars. The other, seventeen-year-old Eric Hansen, becomes enamored with an older woman newly arrived in town.

== Cast ==
- Corey Haim as Eric
- Barbara Williams as Vera
- Keir Dullea as Thorvald
- Emilie-Claire Barlow as Lorraine
- Geneviève Bujold as Eva
- Andrew Miller as Donald
- Kirsten Kieferle as Betty
- Joseph Ziegler as Vern Rawlins
- Robbie Coltrane as Todd
- Denny Doherty as Harol
