= Night Train (2009 film) =

- Film poster
- Directed by: Brian King
- Written by: Brian King
- Produced by: Christopher Eberts; Brian R. Etting; Steve Markoff; Bruce McNall; Wendy Park; Michael Philip; Arnold Rifkin; Jo Marr
- Starring: Danny Glover; Leelee Sobieski; Steve Zahn; Matthias Schweighöfer; Geoff Bell; Constantine Gregory
- Cinematography: Christopher Popp
- Edited by: Patrick Wilfert
- Music by: Henning Lohner
- Release date: July 7, 2009
- Running time: 90 minutes
- Country: United States
- Language: English

Night Train is a 2009 direct-to-video mystery thriller film starring Danny Glover, Leelee Sobieski, and Steve Zahn. Written and directed by M. Brian King, it pays homage to Treasure of the Sierra Madre. It also references a variety of classic suspense films such as Strangers on a Train (1951), The Lady Vanishes (1938), and The Maltese Falcon (1941), though the plot bears only passing resemblance to any of them. The film did not appear in theaters and was released on DVD for US markets in July 2009. It was produced by Rifkin-Eberts Productions.

== Plot ==
One Christmas night, a man runs through a forest carrying something. A nearly deserted train pulls into a station, and two conductors get out, take a stretch, and kill time as no one seems to board. Just as the train is about to depart, the running man calls out, runs to the train, and seems to want to board. He does not speak and, assuming that perhaps he does not know English, the conductors let him on with the intention of getting his money later. He joins two of the only five passengers who appear to be on the train at that point. One of the passengers, an inebriated salesman named Pete, offers the man a drink. The man downs a mouthful of pills, then washes them down with the vodka. Soon after, the man dies as a result of ingesting Seconal combined with alcohol, which causes his heart and lungs to stop working.

Upon this discovery, Pete and another passenger, medical student Chloe, locate the head conductor, Miles, and alert him to what has happened. Miles intends to call the authorities at the next stop, but Pete discovers a mysterious object in the box the dead man was carrying and, peering inside, is intrigued. Chloe also looks inside the object and they immediately, convinced that there is a liberating fortune inside, scheme for ways to keep it. They suggest the idea to Miles, who tells them they're crazy and takes the object and the box it was in back to his office, purportedly to keep it safe and call the authorities, but he too peers inside and his will is overcome.

With a crazed Chloe taking the lead, the three decide to dispose of the man's body and keep the treasure for themselves. Their only problems now are keeping anyone else from finding out, warding off the other suspicious passengers as well as the other conductor, and keeping a close eye on one another, as paranoia takes hold and the box's influence continues to do its work.

Eventually, it is revealed that the box contains a supernatural force of some kind, and that whoever looks into it sees what would tempt them the most, dooming them to corruption and death before dawn. The last survivor, Miles, lives only long enough to attempt to destroy the device by placing it in the path of an oncoming train, but dies just after seeing it nudged off the tracks by a curious dog.

Ultimately, a random toddler-age child wandering alone in the middle of nowhere, miles from any city, town, or train station, picks up the box, looks inside, and smiles.

== Cast ==
- Danny Glover as Miles
- Leelee Sobieski as Chloe
- Steve Zahn as Pete
- Matthias Schweighöfer as Frankie
- Takatsuna Mukai as Hiro
- Togo Igawa as Yamashita
- Richard O'Brien as Mrs. Froy
- Jo Marr as Mr. Cairo
- Constantine Gregory as Mr. Gutman
- Harry Anichkin as Walter
- Geoff Bell as Detective
