= Haunter (film) =

- Theatrical release poster
- Directed by: Vincenzo Natali
- Written by: Brian King
- Produced by: Steve Hoban
- Starring: Abigail Breslin; Peter Outerbridge; Michelle Nolden; Stephen McHattie; Samantha Weinstein
- Cinematography: Jon Joffin
- Edited by: Michael Doherty
- Music by: Alex Khaskin, Ilya Kaplan
- Distributed by: Wild Bunch; IFC Midnight
- Release date: October 18, 2013
- Running time: 97 minutes
- Country: Canada
- Language: English

Haunter is a 2013 Canadian supernatural horror film directed by Vincenzo Natali, written by Brian King, and starring Abigail Breslin. The film premiered at the 2013 South by Southwest Film Festival, and was picked up for U.S. distribution there by IFC Midnight.

== Plot ==
Lisa Johnson, the ghost of a teenage girl who becomes aware that she is dead, haunts a house somewhere in northern Ontario. Along with her parents and brother, who are unaware that they are dead, she is stuck on the same day they were murdered in 1985. As she becomes more aware of her circumstances, she realizes that she can make contact with people in other timelines. As she explores this ability, a pale man appears and warns her to stop. Undeterred, Lisa uses personal items from other people killed in the house to make a connection with Olivia, part of a family living in the house in the future who will become the next set of victims.

With the help of Olivia and the spirits of other murdered girls, Lisa is transported into the timelines of other victims and unravels the mystery of the house, realizing that the previous resident of the house, serial killer Edgar Mullins, is possessing the fathers of the families who live in the house to continue his murders, until his death in 1983. She helps her family to come to terms with the knowledge that they are dead, and thus "awakened", they become able to assist her. After her family escapes to the afterlife, Lisa stays behind to stop Mullins. She is nearly trapped in Olivia's body as Mullins moves on to kill them, but Lisa is able to escape him long enough to summon the spirits of Mullins' past victims, delaying his next kill long enough for the spirits of his other victims to join her. As Mullins is "incinerated" in the furnace where he killed his own victims, Olivia's father retakes control of his body, confused about what just happened. After assuring him and Olivia that they will be a happy family again, Lisa says goodbye to Olivia and goes to sleep, but awakens with her family on her birthday in heaven, out of the loop that Mullins trapped them in.

== Cast ==
- Abigail Breslin as Lisa Johnson
- Peter Outerbridge as Bruce Johnson
- Michelle Nolden as Carol Johnson
- Stephen McHattie as Pale Man – Edgar Mullins
  - David Knoll as Young Edgar
- Peter DaCunha as Robert "Robbie" Johnson
- Samantha Weinstein as Frances Nichols
- Eleanor Zichy as Olivia
- David Hewlett as David – Olivia's Father
- Sarah Manninen as Olivia's Mother
- Martine Campbell as Olivia's Sister
- Michelle Coburn as Mary Brooks
- Tadhg McMahon as Edgar's Father
- Marie Dame as Edgar's Mother

== Soundtrack ==
The film's score was composed by Alex Khaskin.

PopMatters described the soundtrack as "A fable-like soundtrack, included in both diegetic and non-diegetic sound, which is composed around famous sections from Peter and the Wolf.

== Production ==
Haunter was filmed at Toronto and Brantford, Ontario, Canada. Production took 25 days. Natali said that he was drawn to the film because, unlike Splice, which took him twelve years to complete, Haunter only needed to be shot.

== Release ==
Haunter premiered at South by Southwest film festival on March 9, 2013, and received a limited US theatrical release on October 18, 2013. It was released on home video on February 11, 2014, and made $129,447 on domestic video sales.

== Reception ==
Rotten Tomatoes, a review aggregator, reports that 50% of 38 surveyed critics gave the film a positive review; the average rating is 5.1/10. The site's critics' consensus reads: "Haunter's premise is intriguing enough, though the film's too low budget to truly pull it off." Metacritic reports an aggregated score of 49 out of 100 based on 13 critics, indicating "mixed or average reviews".

Linda Barnard of the Toronto Star rated it 2/4 stars and called the script "ill-focused and juvenile". Joe Leydon of Variety called it "a modestly inventive variation on genre conventions". John DeFore of The Hollywood Reporter wrote that the film is "sufficiently novel to uphold [Natali's] reputation as a filmmaker not content telling conventional fanboy stories." Nicolas Rapold of The New York Times wrote, "the film's frazzled thought experiment becomes an adequate yarn." Annlee Ellingson of the Los Angeles Times wrote that Natali "brings cool visuals and a punk attitude to Brian King's cleverly layered script." Josh Modell of The A.V. Club rated it C and wrote, "The occasionally intriguing, but ultimately middling Haunter is caught in some kind of gauzy haunted-house purgatory between a girl-powered YA story and a ghostly serial-killer mystery."

== See also ==
- List of films featuring time loops
