= Tatiana S. Riegel =

American film editor

- Other name: Tanya Riegel
- Education: Boston University (BA)
- Occupation: Film editor
- Years active: 1986–present
- Relatives: Sam Riegel (half-brother); Eden Riegel (half-sister); Kurt Riegel (father); Susan Harding (mother)

Tatiana S. Riegel A.C.E., is an American film editor known for independent films such as Lars and the Real Girl, The Way Way Back and I, Tonya. She received an ACE Eddie award for "Best Edited Miniseries or Motion Picture for Non-Commercial Television".

== Early life ==
Riegel's younger half-siblings are actress Eden Riegel and screenwriter/voice-actor Sam Riegel. Together, the Riegel family has produced more than a dozen webisodes for the popular 2008 Internet series Imaginary Bitches.

== Career ==
Riegel was a long-time assistant to the late editor Sally Menke, editor of seven films by Quentin Tarantino.

Riegel became a member of Academy of Motion Picture Arts and Sciences in 2014 and was nominated for Best Film Editing in 2018 for I, Tonya.

== Personal life ==
Riegel is a lesbian; her half-sister Eden consulted her when portraying the lesbian character Bianca Montgomery on All My Children.

== Selected filmography ==
- River's Edge (1986) (apprentice editor)
- JFK (1991) (assistant editor) *team won Academy Award & BAFTA for "Best Film Editing"
- Honey, I Blew Up the Kid (1992) (assistant film editor)
- Doppelganger (1993) (editor & music editor)
- Last Action Hero (1993) (visual effects assistant editor, uncredited)
- Pulp Fiction (1994) (first assistant editor) *team nominated for Academy Award "Best Film Editing"
- Four Rooms (1995) (first assistant editor) (segment "The Man from Hollywood")
- Lover's Knot (1995) (editor)
- Mr. Holland's Opus (1995) (additional editor)
- Mulholland Falls (1996) (first assistant editor)
- Nightwatch (1997) (first assistant editor)
- Jackie Brown (1997) (associate editor)
- Hurlyburly (1998) (second editor)
- Splendor (1999) (co-editor)
- The Million Dollar Hotel (2000) (editor)
- Pasadena (TV series pilot, 2001) (editor)
- Homeward Bound (2002) (TV) (editor)
- American Dreams (TV series) (20 episodes, 2002–2005)
- House (3 episodes, 2006)
- Pu-239 (2006) (co-editor)
- Lars and the Real Girl (2007) (editor)
- There Will Be Blood (2007) (second editor, with Dylan Tichenor) *team nominated for Academy Award "Best Film Editing"
- Imaginary Bitches (12 webisodes, 2008) (editor)
- The Cleaner (TV series pilot, 2008) (editor)
- The United States of Tara (TV series pilot, 2009) (editor)
- The Men Who Stare at Goats (2009) (editor)
- Glee: The 3D Concert Movie (2011) (co-editor)
- Fright Night (2011) (editor)
- The Way, Way Back (2013) (editor)
- Bad Words (2013) (editor)
- Million Dollar Arm (2014) (editor)
- The Finest Hours (2016) (editor)
- I, Tonya (2017) (editor)
- Gringo (2018) (co-editor)
- The Girl in the Spider's Web (2018) (editor)
- Cruella (2021) (editor)
- Pam & Tommy (TV series, 2022) (co-editor)
- Guardians of the Galaxy Vol. 3 (2023) (Second editor, with Fred Raskin and Greg D'Auria)
- Wicked: For Good (2025) (Second editor, with Myron Kerstein)
- Supergirl (2026) (editor)

== Awards and nominations ==
- PU-239 (2006) - Won ACE Eddie Award "Best Edited Miniseries or Motion Picture for Non-Commercial Television"
- There Will Be Blood (2007) (Second editor) - *Part of team nominated for Academy Award - "Best Film Editing", film was also nominated for ACE Eddie "Best Editing", and for "Best Picture" of the year
- I, Tonya (2017) - Won American Cinema Editors Award for Best Edited Feature Film – Comedy or Musical; nominated for Academy Award for Academy Award for Best Film Editing : Won Independent Spirit Award Best Editing
