= Darknet (TV series) =

- Official show logo
- Genre: Horror
- Created by: Kyra Green
- Written by: Randall Cole; James Kee; Sarah Larsen; Vincenzo Natali; Doug Taylor; Pascal Trottier
- Directed by: Vincenzo Natali; Jeremy Ball; Anthony Scott Burns; Rodrigo Gudiño; Steven Hoban; Brett Sullivan
- Composer: Alex Khaskin
- Country of origin: Canada
- Original language: English
- No. of seasons: 1
- No. of episodes: 6

Production
- Production companies: Copperheart Entertainment; PorchLight Entertainment; 20th Century Fox Television; Gracie Films; Big Idea Entertainment

Original release
- Network: Super Channel; Fox Broadcasting Company
- Release: October 31, 2013

Darknet is a Canadian horror series that ran from October 2013 through March 2014. The show is an adaptation of the Japanese series Tori Hada. The series has been described as being composed of "snippets of people's lives being interrupted by vivid instances of unexpected violence or shocking strangeness" and each episode consists of several interlocking stories. The series' setup allowed for users to submit their own scripts and videos to the official series' social media sites after the season's end.

The first episode of Darknet was released onto the Internet on October 31, 2013 through the series' official Fox Broadcasting Company page and subsequent episodes were made available through Super Channel. The first season of Darknet comprises six episodes and was completed on March 28, 2014.

== Premise ==
Each episode features several different stories that revolve around people in various different horror-related situations. Each story is related to a website called "Darknet", where people can post questions or answers to various topics such as what would be the best way to dispose of a corpse.

== Cast ==
- Michelle Alexander as Alison
- Carlyn Burchell as Katie

== Reception ==
Critical reception for the initial episode of Darknet was positive and IndieWire compared the overall series format to the V/H/S series, as each series comprises several shorts created by different directors. Bleeding Cool praised Natali for "really [nailing] the atmosphere in the most suspenseful scenes". Fangoria also gave the episode a positive rating, as they enjoyed that Natali (who directed the initial episode) connected the stories and fates of the different tales in the pilot episode and felt that it was "one of the most fun and freaky episodes of horror television to come out of the web".

== Broadcast ==
The series is currently available for streaming on Netflix in Australia, Ireland, Romania and possibly other countries. In the United States, it can be streamed on Peacock or can be purchased on Amazon Prime Video.
