= Sam Riegel =

American voice actor (born 1976)

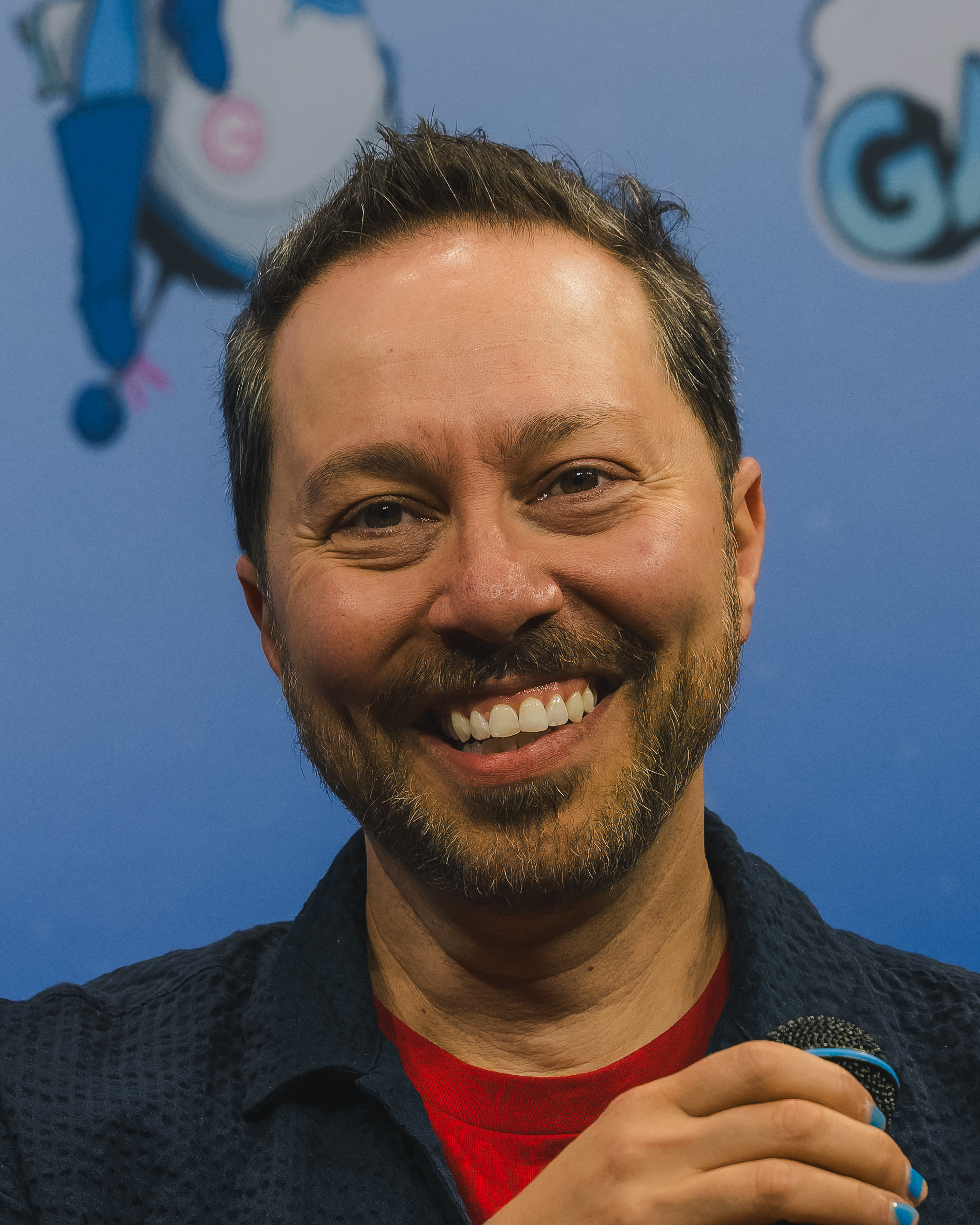
- Riegel in 2026
- Born: Samuel Brent Oscar Riegel; October 9, 1976 (age 50); Washington, D.C., U.S.
- Other names: Sam Regal; Jack Lingo
- Occupations: Voice actor; writer
- Years active: 1997–present
- Spouse: Quyen Tran
- Children: 2
- Relatives: Eden Riegel (sister); Tatiana S. Riegel (half-sister); Jerome Charyn (stepfather)

Samuel Brent Oscar Riegel (born October 9, 1976) is an American voice actor. He is best known for his voice roles as Donatello in the 2003 Teenage Mutant Ninja Turtles series, Phoenix Wright in the Ace Attorney games, and Teddie from Persona 4. He has also worked for Nickelodeon as the voice director for Fresh Beat Band of Spies and Sanjay and Craig, as well as the voice of Riven in the revival of Winx Club. Since 2015, he has been a regular cast member of the web series Critical Role, in which he and other voice actors play Dungeons & Dragons. In 2022, the show's first campaign was adapted into the animated series The Legend of Vox Machina, followed by the second campaign adaptation The Mighty Nein in 2025.

== Early life ==
Samuel Brent Oscar Riegel was born in Washington, D.C. on October 9, 1976, the son of Lenore and Kurt Riegel. His mother later married author Jerome Charyn. His father works as a radio astronomer, environmental executive, and sailor. Riegel is of Jewish descent, with his grandmother being a Holocaust survivor. He is the older brother of actress Eden Riegel and the younger half-brother of filmmaker Tatiana S. Riegel. He grew up in Northern Virginia, where he began performing in local theater at the age of six. He was cast in the touring production of Les Misérables at the age of 11, and performed in The Sound of Music three years later. He also had television roles on Guiding Light and Another World as a teenager, but opted to pursue a career onstage over screen acting as he preferred the live feedback of a theater audience. He joined the Upright Citizens Brigade shortly after graduating from college.

== Career ==
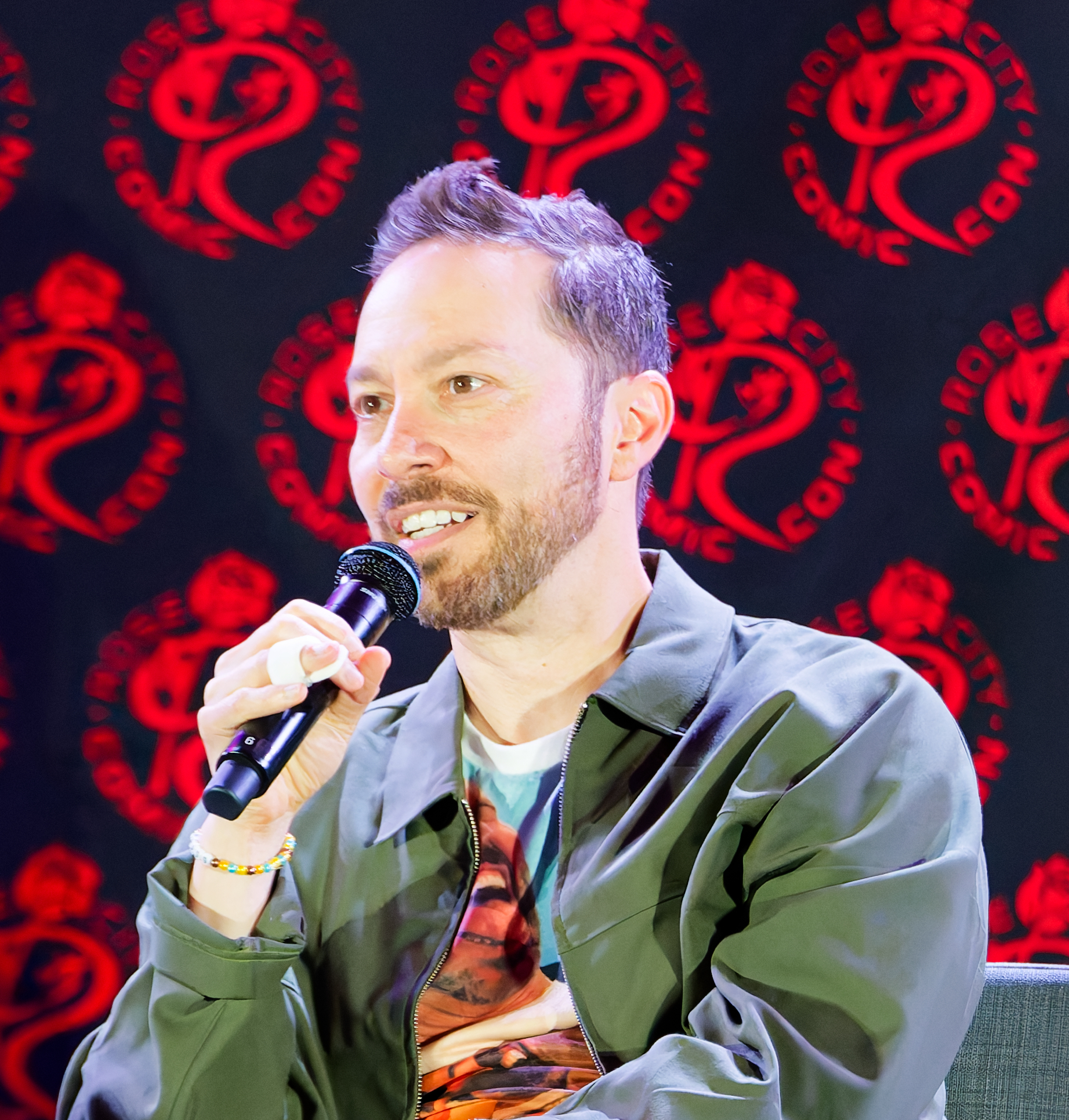
Riegel in 2025

In 2018, Riegel received the Daytime Emmy Award for Outstanding Directing in an Animated Program for his work on Danger & Eggs.

He is also a cast member of the popular web series Critical Role, in which he and other voice actors play Dungeons & Dragons. Critical Role was both the Webby Winner and the People's Voice Winner in the "Games (Video Series & Channels)" category at the 2019 Webby Awards; the show was also both a Finalist and the Audience Honor Winner at the 2019 Shorty Awards. After becoming hugely successful, the Critical Role cast left the Geek & Sundry network in early 2019 and set up their own production company, Critical Role Productions. Soon after, they aimed to raise $750,000 on Kickstarter to create an animated series of their first campaign, but ended up raising over $11 million. In November 2019, Amazon Prime Video announced that they had acquired the streaming rights to this animated series, now titled The Legend of Vox Machina. Riegel reprises his role as Scanlan Shorthalt. He hosts the All Work No Play podcast and spinoff web series with his Critical Role co-star and best friend Liam O'Brien.

== Personal life ==
Riegel lives in Los Angeles with his wife, Vietnamese-American cinematographer Quyen Tran, and their two children. Prior to his marriage, he converted to Catholicism.

On September 11, 2001, Riegel and Tran witnessed the 9/11 attacks on the World Trade Center. They were caught in the dust cloud formed by the collapse of the South Tower, but eventually escaped to Battery Park, where they witnessed the collapse of the North Tower; Riegel captured video footage that has since been featured in several documentaries. Shortly after the events, they moved to California when Tran was accepted to UCLA.

In July 2024, Riegel revealed that he had been diagnosed with HPV-positive oropharyngeal cancer earlier in the year and was recovering after undergoing six weeks of radiation therapy and surgery to remove his tonsils alongside parts of his tongue and soft palate, leaving him with a seven-inch scar across his throat.

== Filmography ==
=== Anime ===
List of dubbing performances in anime
Year	Title	Role	Crew role, notes	Source
2001	Yu-Gi-Oh! Duel Monsters	Tristan Taylor (Ep. 1–10), Rex Raptor (Ep. 2–144), Para, Arkana	1st voice of Tristan and Rex	
2003	Samurai Deeper Kyo	Kotaro Makaora	As Jack Lingo	
2003	Animation Runner Kuromi	Nonki Hayama	As Jack Lingo	
2003	K.O. Beast	Wan Derbard	As Sam Riegel	
2003	Space Pirate Mito	Aoi Mitsukuni	As Jack Lingo	
2004	Comic Party	Kazuki Sendou	As Jack Lingo; Also specials	
2004	Gungrave	Various characters	As Sam Riegel	
2004	Here is Greenwood	Tenma Koizumi, Masato Ikeda	As Sam Riegel	
2004	Ikki Tousen	Chuei Totaku, Student A	As Sam Riegel	
2004	Marmalade Boy	Michael Grant, others	As Sam Riegel and Jack Lingo	
2004	Paranoia Agent	Lil' Slugger, others	As Sam Riegel	
2004	R.O.D	Criminal #2, Cafe Owner, Young Owner	As Sam Riegel	
2004	Shaman King	Faust VIII, Yohmei Asakura	1st Voice of Faust VIII	
2004	Texhnolyze	Kazuho Yoshii, others	As Sam Riegel	
2005	Daphne in the Brilliant Blue	Chang, others	As Sam Riegel and Jack Lingo	
2005	DearS	Hikoro 'Oihiko' Oikawa, Assassin, others	As Sam Riegel and Jack Lingo	
2005	Di Gi Charat	Mishter Manager	As Sam Riegel	
2005	Fafner in the Azure	Hiroto Doma, others	As Sam Riegel	
2005	Ghost Talker's Daydream	Souichiro Kadotake, others	As Sam Riegel and Jack Lingo	
2005	Grenadier – The Senshi of Smiles	Yajiro Kojima	As Sam Riegel	
2005	Koi Kaze	Various characters	As Sam Riegel	
2005	Kyo Kara Maoh!	Gunter	As Jack Lingo	
2005	Le Portrait de Petit Cossette	Eiri's Friend	As Sam Riegel	
2005	Leave it to Piyoko!	BGG Member C, Store Manager, Various characters	As Sam Riegel	
2005	Marmalade Boy movie	Manager	As Sam Riegel	
2005	Mermaid Forest	Fisherman, Sailor, Toba Islander	As Sam Riegel	
2005	Naruto	Zaku Abumi, Shino Aburame, others	1st voice of Shino Aburame	
2005	New Getter Robo	Lab Staff, Guard	As Sam Riegel	
2005	Rumiko Takahashi Anthology	Various characters	As Sam Riegel	
2005	Saiyuki Reload	Impostor Demon, Mob Leader, Gate Guard	As Sam Riegel	
2005	Samurai Champloo	Various characters	As Sam Riegel	
2005	Scrapped Princess	Dennis, Officer, Soldier		
2005	Shingu: Secret of the Stellar Wars	Toshio Mikami, others	As Sam Riegel and Jack Lingo; Also Director and Script Adaptation	
2005	Skyhigh	Various characters	live-action film As Sam Riegel	
2005	Tenjho Tenge	Masayuki Sanada, Dan Inosato	As Sam Riegel	
2005	The Melody of Oblivion	Male Student A, Male Guest, Person of the Cape, Eichi Hikoyama	As Sam Riegel	
2005	The Twelve Kingdoms	Seishou	As Sam Riegel	
2005	Ultra Maniac	Student	As Sam Riegel	
2005	Zatch Bell!	Purio, others		
2006	The Prince of Tennis	Additional voices	As Jack Lingo	
2006	Boys Be...	Kyoichi Kanzaki	Voice director, script As Sam Riegel	
2006	Ergo Proxy	Pull	As Sam Riegel	
2006	Fate/stay night	Shirou Emiya	As Sam Riegel	
2006	Gun Sword	Klatt, others	As Sam Riegel	
2006	Haré+Guu	Ashio	As Sam Riegel	
2006	Kamichu!	Ino, others	As Sam Riegel	
2006	Saiyuki Reload Gunlock	Demon, Taizou	As Sam Riegel	
2007	To Heart	Various characters		
2007	The Melancholy of Haruhi Suzumiya	Taniguchi, Eijirou Ohmori (Appliance Store Owner), others		
2007	Mega Man Star Force	Tom Dubius		
2007–08	The Third: The Girl With the Blue Eye	Joey, others		
2007–08	Digimon Data Squad	Kudamon		
2008–09	Lucky Star	Minoru Shiraishi, Narration		
2008	Code Geass	Clovis la Britannia		
2008	Aika R-16: Virgin Mission	Gusto	As Sam Riegel	
2008	Gurren Lagann	Viral	as Sam Riegel	
2008	Buso Renkin	Madoka Maruyama	As Sam Regal	
2012	Hellsing Ultimate	Wild Geese, Vatican Officers	Ep. 6, 8	
2012–13	Persona 4: The Animation	Teddie		
2012–13	Nura: Rise of the Yokai Clan	Kiyotsugu Kiyojuji	As Sam Riegel	
2012–25	Blue Exorcist	Mephisto Pheles		
2013	K	Yashiro Isana, Fox Spirit (Current Colorless King)		
2013	Digimon Fusion	BlueMeramon		
2013–14	B-Daman Crossfire	Reggie Mak, others		
2016	Sengoku Basara: End of Judgement	Motonari Mōri		
2016–19	One-Punch Man	Metal Bat	As Sam Riegel also OVA's	
2018	Ace Attorney	Furio Tigre		
2020	Ghost in the Shell: SAC 2045	One Man, Agents, ISAF Officer		

=== Animation ===
Key
†	Denotes television productions that have not yet been released

List of voice performances in animation
Year	Title	Role	Crew role	Notes	Source
2003–09	Teenage Mutant Ninja Turtles	Donatello, Delivery Man, Utrom, Triceraton Guard, Swordsmith, Zippy Lad, Shellectro, Yellow Triple Threat, Dark Donatello, Mr. Hambrath, Dr. Chaplin,			
2011–14	Winx Club	Riven, Acheron, Sphinx, Lu Wei, Rumpelstiltskin			
2013–16	Wander Over Yonder	Emperor Awesome, Ship Computer, Something the So and So, Cartoon Awesome, Jimmy, Admiral Admirable, Additional Voices	Dialogue Director		
2013–17	Doc McStuffins	Wilbur, Orville		Into the Hundred Acre Wood!	
2013–18	Sofia the First	Squirrel, Doctor, Smokelee, Royal Builder, Coachman, Yellowbelly, Additional Voices	Dialogue Director		
2014–16	Sanjay and Craig	—N/a	Voice Director		
2015–16	Fresh Beat Band of Spies	Mate, Pirate Guard, Curtis, Kid #1 (2), Fan (3), Audience Guy	Casting Director and Voice Director		
2015–18	Pickle and Peanut	Sultry Dog, Chent, Salesman, College Professor, Party Goer, Mayor, Cody, Additional Voices	Dialogue Director		
2016–18	Home: Adventures with Tip & Oh	Trystane	Voice Director		
2016–18	Future-Worm!	Villager #2, Lew Cregger, Carl, Alien Sam Riegel	Dialogue Director		
2016–2020	Elena of Avalor	Additional Voices, Referee	Dialogue Director		
2017	Danger & Eggs	Phillip's Brother, Lt. Second in Command	Casting Director and Voice Director		
2017–21	DuckTales	Hack, Slash, Tenderfeet / Gavin, Stinky Boot, Two-Toed Jack, Moonlanders, Gilded Man, Pirates	Dialogue Director		
2018–22	Fancy Nancy	Male Announcer, Male Narrator, Dying Old Man, Poor Neighbor, Rabbi Katz, Prison Security Guard	Dialogue Director		
2019–22	Amphibia	Ab-Snatchers Actor, Movie Announcer, Blue Frog With Hat, Gary, Janitor, Brown Overalls Frog, Dartboard Frog, Dark Green Male Frog, Glass Artisan, Grub N Go Hirer, Bell Ringer, Chief McClintock, Cop 2, Arrested Civilian, Patrick, Bearded Frog, Neckerchief Betting Frog, Kurt, Neckerchief Frog, Frog DJ, Orange Haired Frog, Vince, Dragonfly Frog, Scared Hat Bittie, Neckerchief Bittie, Brown Slicked Hair Bittie, Bird Seller Trucker, Ushanka Hat Frog, Bartley, Branson, Ant Cream Worker, Gift Shop Worker, Fleafy, Red Eyed Frog, Blue Toad Soldier, Green Frog with Hat, Leander, Tyler, Tyler's Boyfriend, Hat Customer, Bearded Tough Guy Bus Passenger, Glasses Customer, Mitch Harper, Branson, Blair, Butterfly Drone Soldier Prototype, Scared Museum Observer, Worried Amphibians			
2021–22	Kid Cosmic	PT-SB, Jerry, Feeble Pilot, Travis	Casting Director and Voice Director		
2022	American Dad!	Benny, Athletic Spectator			
2022–23, 2025	Firebuds	Vin Voltage	Dialogue Director	Season 1	
2022–present	The Legend of Vox Machina	Scanlan Shorthalt, Death Knight, Cultist, Various voices	Executive Producer, Writer, and Casting Director		
2023–24	Kiff	—N/a	Voice Director	Season 1	
2023–25	Moon Girl and Devil Dinosaur	—N/a	Dialogue Director		
2025–present	The Sisters Grimm	—N/a	Casting Director		
2025–present	The Mighty Nein	Nott the Brave	Executive Producer, Writer, Casting and Voice Director		

=== Films ===
List of voice performances in direct-to-video and television films
Year	Title	Role	Crew role, notes	Source
2006	Patlabor the Movie	Isao Ota	As Sam Riegel	
2006	Patlabor 2	Isao Ota	As Sam Riegel	
2009	Redline	Miki		
2009	Tales of Vesperia: The First Strike	Flynn Scifo	As Sam Riegel	
2009	Turtles Forever	2003 Donnie	As Sam Riegel	
2010	Freak Dance	Bario	As Sam Riegel	
2011	Little Big Panda	Kung Fucios	As Sam Riegel	
2011	Sengoku Basara: The Last Party	Mori Motonari	As Sam Riegel	
2012	Back to the Sea	Short Seagull		
2013	Zambezia	Hurricanes		
2014	Khumba	Jock		
2015	Tiger and Bunny: The Rising	Mark Schneider		
2017	K: Missing Kings	Yashiro Isana	As Sam Riegel	

=== Video games ===
List of voice performances in video games
Year	Title	Role	Crew role, notes	Source
2004	Obscure	Josh Carter		
2006	Blue Dragon	King Jibral, Turbulent Mai	As Sam Regal	
2006	God Hand	Azel, Bruce, Ravel, Sensei, Villagers		
2006–07	.hack//G.U. series	Silabus, miscellaneous voices		
2007	Eternal Sonata	Allegretto	As Sam Regal	
2007	Digimon World Data Squad	Kudamon, Reppamon, Tyilinmon	As Sam Regal	
2007	Time Crisis 4	Captain Marcus Black	Credited as Jack Lingo	
2008	Final Fantasy IV	Edward	As Sam Regal	
2008	Tales of Vesperia	Flynn Scifo		
2008	Persona 4	Shu Nakajima		
2009	Resident Evil: The Darkside Chronicles	Steve Burnside		
2009	Teenage Mutant Ninja Turtles: Smash Up	Donatello		
2009	Teenage Mutant Ninja Turtles: Turtles in Time Re-Shelled	Donatello, Baxter Stockman, Foot Soldiers		
2009	Kamen Rider: Dragon Knight	Incisor, System Voice	As Sam Regal	
2010	Final Fantasy XIII	Cocoon Inhabitants		
2010	Resonance of Fate	Jean-Paulet		
2010	Fallout: New Vegas	Chris Haversam, Ghouls, Additional Voices	As Sam "Jack Lingo" Riegel	
2010	Metal Gear Solid: Peace Walker	Soldiers / Extras		
2010	Transformers: War for Cybertron	Starscream		
2010	Sengoku Basara: Samurai Heroes	Motonari Mori, Yoritsuna Anegakōji		
2011	Ultimate Marvel vs. Capcom 3	Phoenix Wright		
2012	Battleship	Captain Brent Franklin	As Sam Regal	
2012	The Amazing Spider-Man	Peter Parker / Spider-Man		
2012	Persona 4 Golden	Teddie, Shu Nakajima	Replaced Dave Wittenberg as Teddie	
2012	Transformers: Fall of Cybertron	Starscream		
2012	Resident Evil 6	Enemies		
2013	Tales of Xillia	Jude Mathis		
2013	Fire Emblem Awakening	Stahl, Donnel	As Sam Regal	
2013	Aliens: Colonial Marines	Marines		
2013	Naruto video games	Baki		
2013	Phoenix Wright: Ace Attorney – Dual Destinies	Phoenix Wright		
2013	Sly Cooper: Thieves in Time	Tennessee Kid Cooper, Red-Eye Robles		
2013	Gears of War: Judgment	Aftermath Survivor, Survivor Three, Lab Polanski		
2013	Final Fantasy XIV: A Realm Reborn	Alphinaud Leveilleur	As Sam Regal	
2013	Rune Factory 4	Arthur	Also Special	
2013	Call of Juarez: Gunslinger	Dwight		
2014	The Amazing Spider-Man 2	Peter Parker / Spider-Man		
2014	Transformers: Rise of the Dark Spark	Starscream, Autobot Soldier 02		
2014	Power Rangers Super Megaforce	Various voices	As Sam Regal	
2015	Pillars of Eternity	Heodan	As Sam Regal	
2015	Minecraft: Story Mode	Griefer		
2015	Guild Wars 2: Heart of Thorns	Braham		
2016	Fallout 4: Far Harbor	Faraday, Devin, Cole		
2016	Phoenix Wright: Ace Attorney – Spirit of Justice	Phoenix Wright		
2016	Ratchet & Clank	Zed, Zurkon Jr.		
2016	World of Final Fantasy	Ultros		
2016	Yu-Gi-Oh! Duel Links	Rex Raptor, Arkana and Para		
2016	Lego Dimensions	Templeton "Faceman" Peck, "Armman"	Credited under "Voice Talent"	
2017	Fire Emblem Heroes	Stahl, Raigh, Donnel	As Sam Regal	
2018	Pillars of Eternity 2: Deadfire	Rekke		
2018	Pillars of Eternity 2: Deadfire: Critical Role Pack	Scanlan Shorthalt		
2018	Guild Wars 2: Path of Fire	Qadim		
2018	Fallout 76	Ranger Ross, Victor, Quentin Arlen		
2019	Rage 2	Walker (Male)	As Sam Regal	
2019	Indivisible	Ren, Iron Kingdom Soldier, Monk (voice)	As Sam Regal	
2019	Freedom Finger	Mission Control		
2020	One Punch Man: A Hero Nobody Knows	Metal Bat		
2020	Bugsnax	Gramble Gigglefunny		
2021	Nier Replicant ver.1.22474487139...	Jakob, additional voices		
2021	Teppen	Phoenix Wright		
2022	Chocobo GP	Ifrit, Ultros		
2022	Return to Monkey Island	Quarantined Pirate		
2023	Disgaea 7: Vows of the Virtueless	Prinny		
2024	Like a Dragon: Infinite Wealth	Additional voices		
2025	Like a Dragon: Pirate Yakuza in Hawaii	Additional voices		
2025	Dispatch	Sweetalker		

=== Documentary ===
List of acting performances in documentaries
Year	Title	Role	Crew role, notes	Source
2011	"Sam Riegel and Quyen Tran on 9/11"	Himself	Documentary footage on 9/11 attack, used in 102 Minutes That Changed America and other documentaries	

=== Web series ===
List of appearances in web series
Year	Title	Role	Notes	Source
2015–present	Critical Role	Scanlan Shorthalt, Taryon Darrington (campaign 1)	Cast member; Dungeons & Dragons actual play web series	
2015–present	Critical Role	Nott the Brave/Veth Brenatto, Luc Brenatto (campaign 2)	Cast member; Dungeons & Dragons actual play web series	
2015–present	Critical Role	Fresh Cut Grass (F.C.G.), Braius Doomseed (campaign 3)	Cast member; Dungeons & Dragons actual play web series	
2015–present	Critical Role	Wicander Halovar (campaign 4)	Cast member; Dungeons & Dragons actual play web series	
2016–21	Talks Machina	Himself	A Critical Role aftershow	
2018	Between the Sheets	Himself	Episode: "Between the Sheets: Sam Riegel"	
2018–2020	All Work No Play	Himself	A web series where Riegel and Liam O'Brien catch up over a drink and try a new activity each episode. The show was developed from their original AWNP podcast (2012–2017).	
2020	AWNP: Unplugged	Himself	A spinoff web series during the COVID-19 pandemic where Riegel and O'Brien caught-up via video chat.	
2022	Exandria Unlimited: Calamity	Loquatius Seelie	Actual play anthology series; 4 episodes	
2022–24	4-Sided Dive	Himself	A Critical Role aftershow	
2025	Wildemount Wildlings	Game master	Actual play limited series; 3 episodes	
2025	Age of Umbra	Snyx	Actual play limited series using the Daggerheart system	

=== Audio books ===
List of voice performances in audio books
Year	Title	Role	Source
2022	Critical Role: The Mighty Nein – The Nine Eyes of Lucien	Veth Brenatto	
2025	Critical Role: Vox Machina – Stories Untold	Narrator, Taryon Darrington	
2026	Critical Role: Mighty Nein – Stories Untold	Narrator	
