= Cube (1997 film) =

Film by Vincenzo Natali

- Theatrical release poster
- Directed by: Vincenzo Natali
- Written by: André Bijelic; Graeme Manson; Vincenzo Natali
- Produced by: Mehra Meh; Betty Orr
- Starring: Nicole de Boer; Nicky Guadagni; David Hewlett; Andrew Miller; Julian Richings; Wayne Robson; Maurice Dean Wint
- Cinematography: Derek Rogers
- Edited by: John Sanders
- Music by: Mark Korven
- Production company: Cube Libre
- Distributed by: Cineplex Odeon Films; Trimark Pictures
- Release dates: 9 September 1997 (Toronto International Film Festival); 11 September 1998 (United States)
- Running time: 90 minutes
- Country: Canada
- Language: English
- Budget: $350,000 CAD
- Box office: $9 million

Cube is a 1997 Canadian science fiction horror film directed and co-written by Vincenzo Natali. A product of the Canadian Film Centre's First Feature Project, Nicole de Boer, Nicky Guadagni, David Hewlett, Andrew Miller, Julian Richings, Wayne Robson, and Maurice Dean Wint star as seven individuals trapped in a bizarre and deadly labyrinth of cube-shaped rooms.

Cube gained notice for its surreal and Kafkaesque setting in industrial, cube-shaped rooms. It received generally positive reviews and led to a series of films. A Japanese remake was released in 2021.

== Plot ==
A man named Alderson awakens in a cube shaped room that has hatches on each surface which all lead to a labyrinth of similar rooms. He enters another room and is killed by a hidden trelliswork-like wire trap that slices him into cubes.

Five people meet in another room: police officer Quentin, prison escape artist Rennes, designer Worth, math student Leaven and medical doctor Holloway. Quentin warns the group he has seen traps in some other rooms. Leaven notices that each hatch bears three sets of numbers. Rennes figures to make for the edge of the labyrinth by testing rooms for traps by throwing their boots in first, but is killed by an acid trap in one of the rooms; his body is dragged into the room the others were already standing in.

Leaven attempts to identify traps using the numbers, hypothesising that rooms whose plates contain prime numbers are trapped. They encounter a mentally disabled man named Kazan, whom Holloway insists be brought along. Tension rises among the group after Leaven's hypothesis is proven wrong and Quentin gets injured by razor wires in one of the rooms. Worth admits to Quentin in an ensuing argument that he was hired to design the labyrinth's outer shell. Worth believes the Cube labyrinth was created accidentally by an out-of-control bureaucratic project whose original purpose has been lost and which continues without any overseeing authority, and that the group have been placed inside only to justify its existence.

Using Worth's knowledge of the Cube labyrinth's dimensions, Leaven estimates that it contains 17,576 rooms and theorizes that the numbers indicate their coordinates within the superstructure. The group travels toward the outer edge but finds a void between the final room and the outer shell. Holloway attempts to reach the outer shell using a rope made from clothing, but Quentin, after catching her when the rope slips, deliberately drops her to her death.

Quentin attempts to abduct Leaven and abandon the others, but Worth tries to stop him. After a struggle, Quentin throws Worth through a hatch, leading to the same room containing Rennes' corpse. At first fearing they've been going in circles, the group realizes that the rooms periodically shift position and that an exit room that bridges to the outer shell may become accessible when they align. When Leaven determines the trapped rooms are marked with powers of prime numbers, Kazan is revealed as a savant who can calculate factorizations in his head instantaneously. With Kazan calculating the numbers, the group navigates toward the exit.

As Quentin becomes increasingly aggressive, Worth traps Quentin in a hatch so the others can escape to the exit. As all but Quentin get to the bridge room, they open the final hatch, revealing a bright light. Quentin reappears and, using a detached hatch handle, fatally stabs Leaven. In response, Worth attacks Quentin, but is also stabbed. As Quentin pursues Kazan through the exit, a mortally wounded Worth grabs Quentin's legs, trapping him in the bridge’s doorway. The bridge moves, killing Quentin by tearing him in half. As the bridge returns to the recesses of the labyrinth, Worth crawls toward Leaven's corpse, as Kazan walks into the bright light.

== Cast ==
Each character's name is connected with a real-world prison: Quentin (San Quentin State Prison, California), Holloway (HM Prison Holloway, England), Kazan (Russia), Rennes (Centre pénitentiaire de Rennes, France), Alderson (Federal Prison Camp, Alderson, West Virginia), Leaven and Worth (Leavenworth Detention Center, Kansas).

- Andrew Miller as Kazan, a developmentally disabled savant and mental calculator
- David Hewlett as David Worth, an office worker and unwitting designer of the Cube's outer shell
- Maurice Dean Wint as Quentin McNeil, a police officer who aggressively takes charge
- Nicole de Boer as Joan Leaven, a young mathematics student
- Nicky Guadagni as Dr. Helen Holloway, a free clinic doctor and conspiracy theorist
- Wayne Robson as Rennes, an escape artist who has broken out of seven prisons
- Julian Richings as Alderson, the first killed in the Cube and the only one not to meet the others

== Production ==
=== Pre-production ===
Alfred Hitchcock's Lifeboat, which was shot entirely in a lifeboat with no actor standing at any point, was reportedly an inspiration for the film.

Director Vincenzo Natali did not have confidence in financing a film. He cost-reduced his pitch with a single set reused as many times as possible, with the actors moving around a virtual maze. As the most expensive element, a set with a cube and a half was built off the floor, to allow the surroundings to be lit from behind all walls of the cube. In 1990, Natali had the idea to make a film "set entirely in hell", but in 1994 while working as a storyboard artist's assistant at Canada's Nelvana animation studio, he completed the first script for Cube. The initial draft had a more comedic tone, surreal images, a cannibal, edible moss growing on the walls, and a monster that roamed the Cube. Roommate and childhood filmmaking partner Andre Bijelic helped Natali strip the central idea to its essence of people avoiding deadly traps in a maze. Scenes outside the cube were deleted, and the identity of the victims changed. In some drafts, they were accountants and in others criminals, with the implication that their banishment to the Cube was part of a penal sentence. One of the most important dramatic changes was the removal of food and water for a more urgent escape.

Before writing Cube, Natali developed the short film Elevated. It is set in an elevator to show investors how Cube would hypothetically look and feel. Cinematographer Derek Rogers developed strategies for shooting in the tightly confined elevator, which he later reused on a Toronto soundstage for Cube.

=== Casting ===
Casting started with Natali's friends, and budget limitations allowed for only one day of script reading prior to shooting. On casting Maurice Dean Wint as Quentin, Natali's cost-centric approach sought an actor for a split-personality role of hero and villain. Wint was considered the standout among the cast and was confident that the film would be a breakthrough for the Canadian Film Centre.

As it was filmed relatively quickly with well prepared actors, there are no known outtake clips.

=== Filming ===
The film was shot in Toronto, Ontario, in 21 days, with 50% of the budget as C$350,000 to C$375,000 in cash and the other 50% as donated services, for a total of C$700,000. Natali considered the cash figure to be deceptive, because they deferred payment on goods and services, and got the special effects at no cost.

The set's warehouse was near a train line, and its noise was incorporated into the film as that of the cubes moving. To change the look of each room, some scenes were shot with wide lens, and others are long lens and lit with different colors, for the illusion of traversing a maze. Nicole de Boer said that the white room was more comforting to actors at the start of a day's filming, compared to the red room which induced psychological effects on the cast during several hours in the confined space.

Only one cube set was actually built, with each of its sides measuring 14 feet (4.3 m) in length, with only one working door that could actually support the weight of the actors. The colour of the room was changed by sliding panels. This time-consuming procedure determined that the film was not shot in sequence, and all shots taking place in rooms of a specific color were shot separately. Six colors of rooms were intended to match the recurring theme of six throughout the film; five sets of gel panels, plus pure white. However, the budget did not stretch to the sixth gel panel, and so the film has only five room colors. Another partial cube was made for shots requiring the point of view of standing in one room and looking into another.

The small set created technical problems for hosting a 30-person crew and a 6-person cast, becoming "a weird fusion between sci-fi and the guerrilla-style approach to filmmaking".

=== Mathematical accuracy ===
The Cube was conceived by mathematician David W. Pravica, who was the math consultant. It consists of an outer cubical shell or sarcophagus, and the inner cube rooms. Each side of the outer shell is 434 feet (132 m) long. The inner cube consists of 26^{3} = 17,576 cubical rooms (minus an unknown number of empty rooms to allow for movement), each having a side length of 15.5 feet (4.7 m). A space of 15.5 feet (4.7 m) is between the inner cube and the outer shell. Each room is labelled with three identification numbers such as "517 478 565". These numbers encode the starting coordinates of the room, and the X, Y, and Z coordinates are the sums of the digits of the first, second, and third number, respectively. The numbers also determine the movement of the room. The subsequent positions are obtained by cyclically subtracting the digits from one another, and the resulting numbers are then successively added to the starting numbers.

=== Post-production ===
During post-production, Natali spent months "on the aural environment", including appropriate sound effects of each room, so the Cube could feel like what he described as a haunted house.

== Release ==
=== Theatrical ===
Cube was shown at the Toronto International Film Festival on 9 September 1997 and released in Ottawa and Montreal on 18 September 1998. A theatrical release occurred in Spain in early 1999, while in Italy a release was scheduled for July 1999 and an opening in Germany was set for later that year. In the Japanese market, it became the top video rental at the time, and exceeded expectations, with co-writer Graeme Manson suggesting people in Japan had a better understanding of living in boxes so resonated better with the Japanese audience, as they were likely "more receptive to the whole metaphor underlying the film".

The film's television debut in the United States was on 24 July 1999 on the Sci-Fi channel.

In 2023, the film was one of 23 titles that were digitally restored under its new Canadian Cinema Reignited program to preserve classic Canadian films.

A 4K restoration of the film debuted at the 28th Fantasia International Film Festival on July 30, 2024.

=== Home media ===
The film was released on VHS and DVD formats on January 26, 1999, by Trimark Home Video.

== Reception ==
=== Box office ===
In its home country of Canada, the film was a commercial failure, lasting only a few days in Canadian theatres. French film distributor Samuel Hadida's company Metropolitan Filmexport saw potential in the film and spent $1.2 million in a marketing campaign, posting flyers in many cities and flying members of the cast over to France to meet moviegoers. At its peak, the film was shown at 220 French box offices and became among the most popular films in France of that time, collecting over $10 million in box office receipts. It went on to be the second-highest-grossing film in France that summer.

Elsewhere internationally, the film grossed $501,818 in the United States, and $8,479,845 in other territories, for a worldwide total of $8,981,663.

=== Critical response ===
On the review aggregator website Rotten Tomatoes, 63% of 40 critics' reviews are positive, with an average rating of 6.3/10. The website's consensus reads: "Cube sometimes struggles with where to take its intriguing premise, but gripping pace and an impressive intelligence make it hard to turn away." Metacritic, which uses a weighted average, assigned the film a score of 61 out of 100, based on 12 critics, indicating "generally favorable" reviews.

Bob Graham of the San Francisco Chronicle was highly critical: "If writer-director Vincenzo Natali, storyboard artist for Keanu Reeves's Johnny Mnemonic, were as comfortable with dialogue and dramatizing characters as he is with images, this first feature of his might have worked better". Nick Schager from Slant Magazine rated the film three out of five stars, noting that, its intriguing premise and initially chilling mood were undone by threadbare characterizations, and lack of a satisfying explanation for the cube's existence. He concluded the film "winds up going nowhere fast".

Anita Gates of The New York Times was more positive, saying the story "proves surprisingly gripping, in the best Twilight Zone tradition. The ensemble cast does an outstanding job on the cinematic equivalent of a bare stage... Everyone has his or her own theory about who is behind this peculiar imprisonment... The weakness in Cube is the dialogue, which sometimes turns remarkably trite... The strength is the film's understated but real tension. Vincenzo Natali, the film's fledgling director and co-writer, has delivered an allegory, too, about futility, about the necessity and certain betrayal of trust, about human beings who do not for a second have the luxury of doing nothing". Bloody Disgusting gave a positive review: "Shoddy acting and a semi-weak script can't hold this movie back. It's simply too good a premise and too well-directed to let minor hindrances derail its creepy premise". Kim Newman from Empire Online gave the film 4/5 stars, writing: "Too many low-budget sci-fi films try for epic scope and fail; this one concentrates on making the best of what it's got and does it well".

=== Accolades ===
The film won the award for Best Canadian First Feature Film at the 1997 Toronto International Film Festival and the Jury Award at the Brussels International Festival of Fantasy Film.

In 2001, an industry poll conducted by Playback named it the eighth best Canadian film of the preceding 15 years.

== Franchise ==
=== Sequel ===
Cube was followed by a sequel, Cube 2: Hypercube, released in 2002.

=== Prequel ===
A prequel, Cube Zero, was released in 2004.

=== Remake ===
In April 2015, The Hollywood Reporter wrote that Lionsgate Films was planning to remake the film, titled Cubed, with Saman Kesh directing, Roy Lee and Jon Spaihts producing, and a screenplay by Philip Gawthorne, based on Kesh’s original take.

A Japanese remake of the same title; based on Natali, Graeme Manson and André Bijelic's original script, was released in October 2021.

== See also ==
- "The Library of Babel"
- List of cult films
- List of films about mathematicians
- Saw (2004 film)
