= Vincenzo Natali =

American and Canadian filmmaker (born 1969)

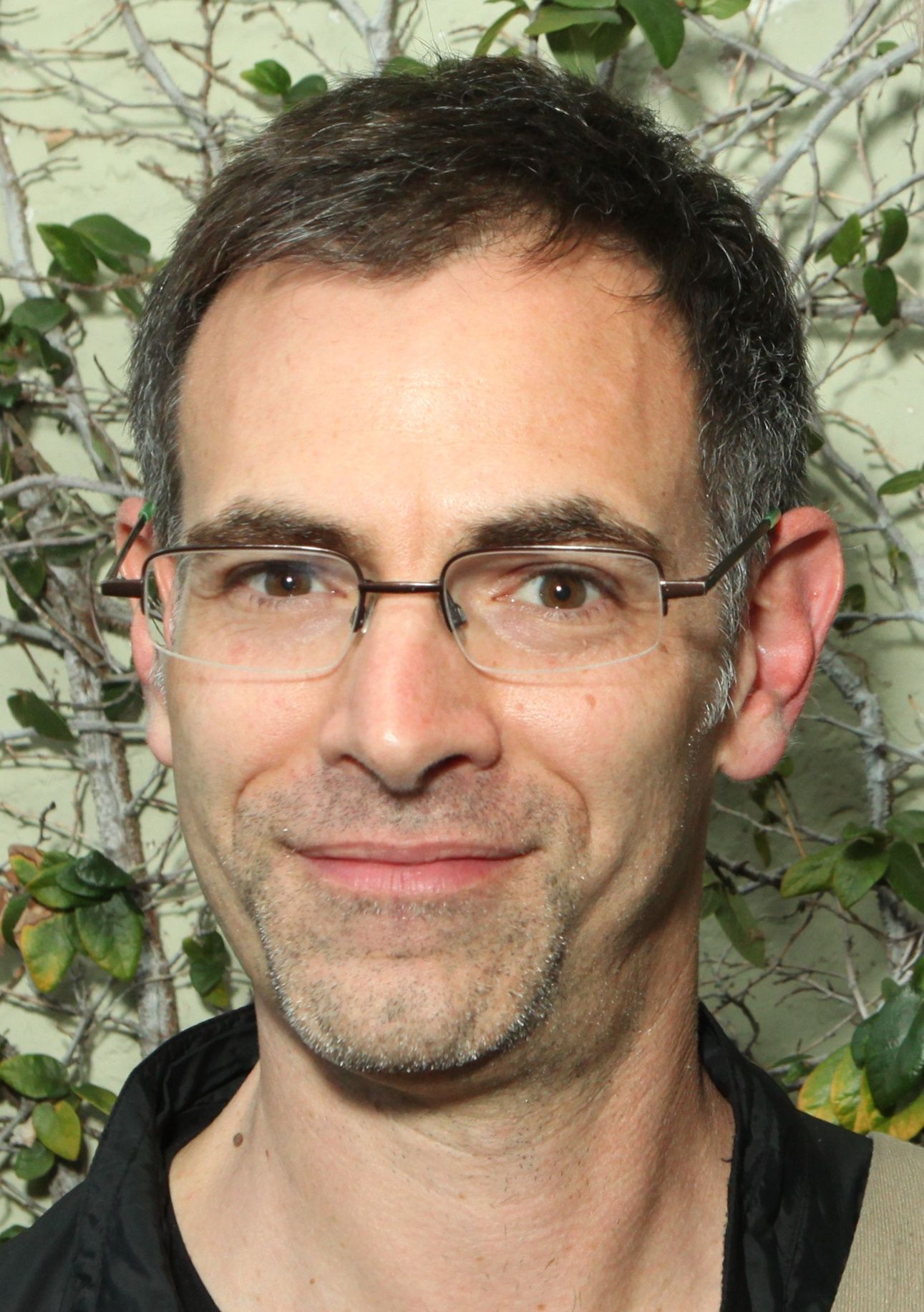
- Natali in 2013
- Born: 6 January 1969 (age 57); Detroit, Michigan, U.S.
- Citizenship: Canada; United States
- Education: Royal St. George's College; Toronto Metropolitan University (BA)
- Occupations: Film director; screenwriter
- Years active: 1997–present
- Website: vincenzo-natali.com

Vincenzo Natali (born 6 January 1969) is a Canadian and American film director and screenwriter, known for writing and directing science fiction and horror films such as Cube, Cypher, Nothing, and Splice.

== Early life and education ==
Natali was born in Detroit, to a nursery school teacher/painter mother and a photographer father. He is of Italian and English descent. He moved to Toronto, along with his family, at the age of one. During his time at Royal St. George's College, Natali befriended British-born Canadian actor David Hewlett, who has appeared in the majority of films that Natali has directed. Natali also attended the film programme at Ryerson Polytechnical Institute. He was eventually hired as a storyboard artist at the Nelvana Animation Studios. His cinematic influences included Samuel Beckett, David Cronenberg, and Terry Gilliam.

== Career ==
Natali's directing debut came in 1997, when he directed Cube which he also co-wrote. The film became a success worldwide, especially in Japan and France, grossing over $10 million in the latter country, and breaking box office records for a Canadian film. At the 19th Genie Awards, the film received five nominations, and also won the award for Best Canadian First Feature at the Toronto International Film Festival. After this success, Natali went on to direct Cypher (2002) and Nothing (2003).

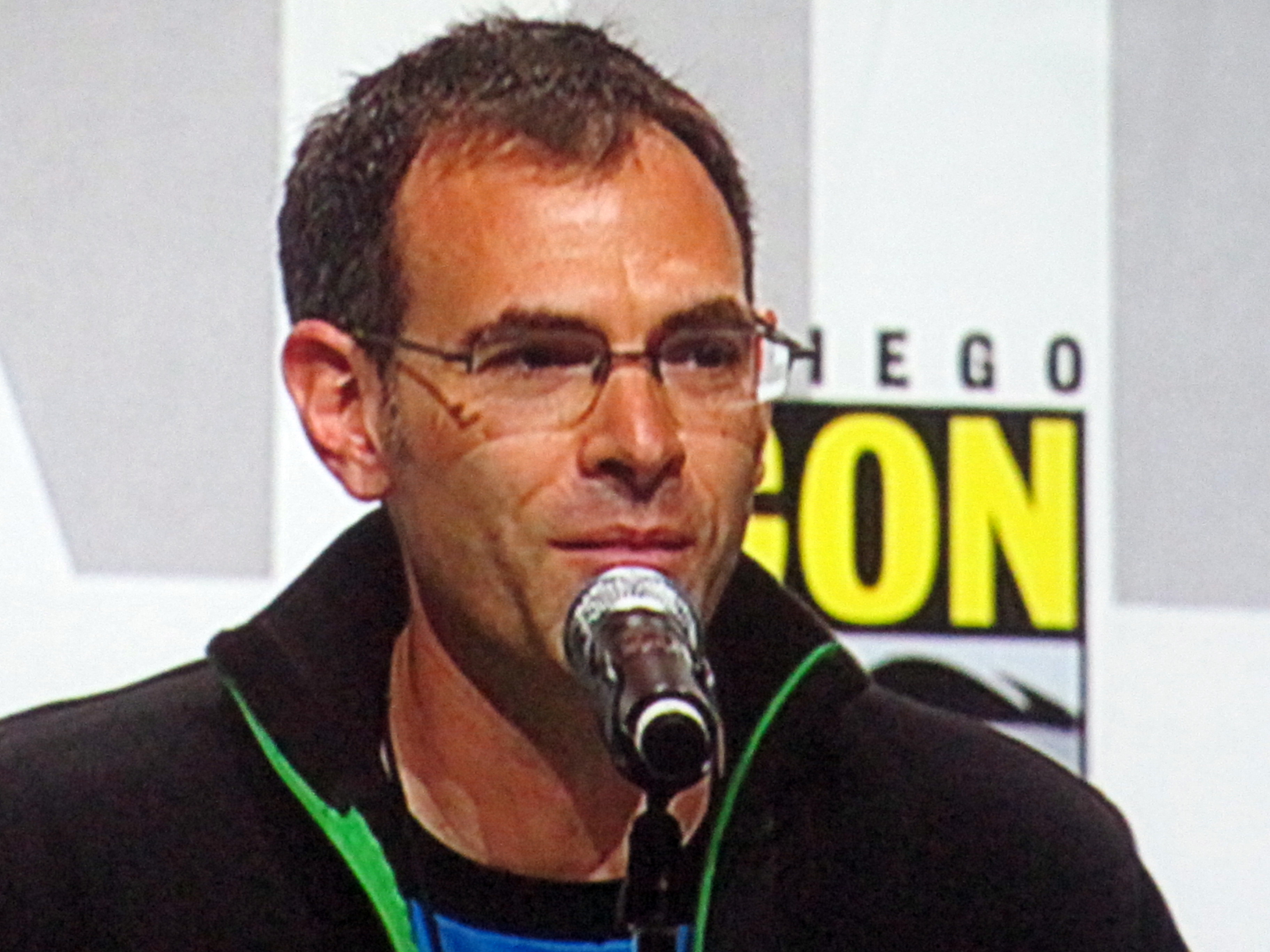
Natali at a panel for Splice at the 2010 San Diego Comic Con

Following the June 2010 release of Splice (2009), Natali's next efforts were expected to be an adaptation of J. G. Ballard's 1975 novel High Rise and a 3D adaptation of the Len Wein/Berni Wrightson comic book character Swamp Thing, for producer Joel Silver. A May 2010 item in The Hollywood Reporter, however, announced that Natali was to replace Joseph Kahn as director of the highly anticipated adaptation of cyberpunk author William Gibson's 1984 novel Neuromancer.

Natali was nominated for the 4th Annual Splatcademy Awards under the category "Best Director" presented by Cadaver Lab for his work Splice. In 2013 his series Darknet, an adaptation of the Japanese series Tori Hada, began airing on Super Channel in Canada. In 2014, he directed the episodes "Su-zakana" and "Naka-choko" of the second season of the crime drama series Hannibal and in 2015 the episodes "Antipasto", "Primavera" and "Secondo" of the third season of the same TV series. in 2015, he also directed the second episode (entitled "Simon") of the first season of the American supernatural drama television series The Returned. In 2016, he directed the fourth episode ("Dissonance Theory") of the HBO series Westworld. In 2017, he directed the fifth episode ("Lemon Scented You") of the Starz series American Gods. He directed a pilot for a new Tremors TV series starring Kevin Bacon reprising his role from the 1990 film but it was not picked up by SyFy as a series.

A television adaptation of William Gibson's The Peripheral was put into development in April 2018 by Amazon, with Natali among the executive producers. Natali directed the show's pilot, plus three other episodes of the first season.

He directed the last two episodes of the first season for the Locke & Key TV series, distributed by Netflix.

In 2024, he was awarded the Trailblazer Award at the 28th Fantasia International Film Festival.

== Filmography ==
=== Short film ===
Year	Title	Director	Writer	Notes
1996	Elevated	Yes	Yes	
2006	Quartier de la Madeleine	Yes	Yes	Segment of Paris, je t'aime
2014	U is for Utopia	Yes	Yes	Segment of ABCs of Death 2

=== Executive producer ===
- Eyes on the Road (2006)
- Cube (2021)

=== Feature film ===
Year	Title	Director	Writer	Executive Producer
1997	Cube	Yes	Yes	No
2002	Cypher	Yes	No	No
2003	Nothing	Yes	Yes	Yes
2009	Splice	Yes	Yes	No
2011	388 Arletta Avenue	No	No	Yes
2013	Haunter	Yes	No	Yes
2018	Come True	No	No	Yes
2019	In the Tall Grass	Yes	Yes	Yes

=== Documentary ===
Year	Title	Notes
2005	Getting Gilliam	Documentary on the making of Terry Gilliam's Tideland

=== Television ===
Year	Title	Episode
1996	Space Cases	"The Sporting Kind"
1998	PSI Factor: Chronicles of the Paranormal	"Pentimento"
1998–1999	Earth: Final Conflict	"Payback" "Friendly Fire"
2013	Darknet	Episode 1, also executive producer
2014–2015	Hannibal	"Su-zakana" "Naka-choko" "Antipasto" "Primavera" "Secondo" "Dolce"
2014	Hemlock Grove	"Gone Sis"
2014	Ascension	"Chapter Two: Part 1"
2015	The Returned	"Simon"
2015	Orphan Black	"Insolvent Phantom of Tomorrow"
2015–2016	The Strain	"Fallen Light" "The Night Train" "Do or Die"
2016	Wayward Pines	"City Upon a Hill"
2016	Luke Cage	"Step in the Arena"
2016–2018	Westworld	"Dissonance Theory" "Reunion"
2017	American Gods	"Lemon Scented You"
2018	Lost in Space	"Eulogy"
2020	Locke & Key	"Echoes" "Crown of Shadows"
2020	The Stand	"The Walk" "The Stand"
2022	Guillermo del Toro's Cabinet of Curiosities	"The Graveyard Rats"
2022	The Peripheral	Episodes 1, 2, 5, and 6, also executive producer
2025	The Copenhagen Test	"Looking Glass" "Allegiance"
2026	VisionQuest	"Firewall" "Deadlock"
2027	The Last of Us	Post-production
