= List of films: Q–R =

indexed lists of films
0–9	A	B	C	D	E	F
G	H	I	J–K	L	M	N–O
P	Q–R	S	T	U–V–W	X–Y–Z	

This is an alphabetical list of film articles (or sections within articles about films). It includes made for television films. See the talk page for the method of indexing used.

== Q ==
- Q: (1982 & 2011)
- Q&A (1990)
- Q Ball (2019)
- Q-Bec My Love (1970)
- Q Planes (1939)
- Q.R.R (Quien resulte responsable) (1970)

=== Qa–Qo ===
- Qafqaz və Merkuri cəmiyyətinin paroxodunun limandan yola düşməsi (1898)
- Qahar (1997)
- Qaid (1975)
- Qaidi: (1940, 1957, 1962, 1984 & 1986)
- Qaidi Band (2017)
- Qaidi No. 911 (1959)
- Qala (2022)
- Qalb (2024)
- Qallunaat! Why White People Are Funny (2006)
- Qamaran wa Zaytouna (2001)
- Qarib Qarib Singlle (2017)
- Qasam (1993)
- Qasam Se Qasam Se (2012)
- Qatil (1988)
- Qatl (1986)
- Qatil Aur Ashiq (1986)
- Qayamat (1983)
- Qayamat Se Qayamat Tak (1998)
- Qayamat – A Love Triangle In Afghanistan (2003)
- Qayamat: City Under Threat (2003)
- Qerq (2007)
- Qeysar (1969)
- Qila (1998)
- Qimmit, a Clash of Two Truths (2010)
- Qing Chang Ru Zhan Chang (1957)
- Qismat (2018)
- Qismat 2 (2021)
- Qissa (2013)
- Qissa Panjab (2015)
- Qissa-e Parsi: The Parsi Story (2014)
- Qiu Jin (1983)
- Qivitoq (1956)
- Qortimet e vjeshtës (1982)

=== Qu ===
- Qu Yuan (1977)
- Qu'est-ce qu'on attend pour être heureux! (1982)

==== Qua ====
- Qua la mano (1980)
- The Quack (1982)
- Quack Shot (1954)
- Quackser Fortune Has a Cousin in the Bronx (1970)
- Quacker Tracker (1967)
- Quackodile Tears (1962)
- Quad (2013)
- Quad God (2000)
- Quadrilateral (2024)
- Quadrille: (1938, 1997 & 1999)
- Quadrophenia (1979)
- Quai des Orfèvres (1947)
- The Quail Hunt (1935)
- Quake (1992 TV)
- The Quake (2018)
- The Quakeress (1913)
- A Qualcuna Piace Calvo (1959)
- The Qualified Adventurer (1925)
- Quality of Life (2004)
- The Quality of Mercy (1994)
- Quality Street: (1927 & 1937)
- Quality Time (2017)
- Qualquer Gato Vira-Lata (2011)
- Qualunquemente (2011)
- Quand j'avais cinq ans je m'ai tué (1994)
- Quand on crie au loup (2019)
- Quando c'era lui... caro lei! (1978)
- Quando la coppia scoppia (1981)
- Quando Elas Querem (1925)
- Quando Eu Era Vivo (2014)
- Quanto è bello lu murire acciso (1976)
- Quanto sei bella Roma (1959)
- Quantrill's Raiders (1958)
- Quantum Hoops (2007)
- Quantum Love (2014)
- Quantum Quest: A Cassini Space Odyssey (2010)
- Quantum of Solace (2008)
- Quarantine: (1923, 1983, 2008 & 2021)
- Quarantine 2: Terminal (2011)
- Quarantine L.A. (2013)
- Quarantined (1970)
- The Quarrel (1991)
- The Quarry: (1998 & 2020)
- Quarta Divisão (2013)
- The Quarterback: (1926 & 1940)
- Quarterback Princess (1981)
- Quartet: (1948, 1981 & 2012)
- Quartet of Five (1949)
- Quartier V.I.P. (2005)
- Quartiere (1987)
- Quasi at the Quackadero (1975)
- Quasimodo d'El Paris (1999)
- Quatermass 2 (1957)
- The Quatermass Experiment (2005 TV)
- Quatermass and the Pit (1967)
- The Quatermass Xperiment (1955)
- Quatre-vingt-treize (1920)
- Quattro bravi ragazzi (1993)
- Quax in Africa (1947)
- Quax the Crash Pilot (1941)
- Quay (2015)

==== Que ====
- Que Dios me perdone (1948)
- Que la barque se brise, que la jonque s'entrouvre (2001)
- Que me toquen las golondrinas (1957)
- Que Sera (2014)
- Que sera, sera (2002)
- Que viva la lucha (2007)
- Quebec (1951)
- Quebec – Path of Conquest (1942)
- Queberc: (1951 & 2007)
- Quebracho (1974)
- A Queda (1976)
- Queen: (2014 & 2018)
- The Queen: (1968, 2006 & 2012)
- Queen of the Amazons (1947)
- Queen of the Arena (1952)
- The Queen in Australia (1954)
- Queen of Babylon (1954)
- The Queen of the Baths (1926)
- Queen Bee (1955)
- Queen Bees (2021)
- The Queen of Biarritz (1934)
- Queen of Blood: (1966 & 2014)
- Queen of the Boulevards (1927)
- Queen of Broadway (1942)
- Queen of Burlesque (1946)
- Queen of Cactus Cove (2005)
- Queen of Carthage (2014)
- A Queen for Caesar (1962)
- Queen of the Chantecler (1962)
- Queen Christina (1933)
- Queen of Clubs (1966)
- Queen and Country (2014)
- Queen of the Damned (2002)
- Queen for a Day (1951)
- Queen of the Desert (2015)
- Queen Draga (1920)
- Queen of Earth (2015)
- Queen of Fashion (1929)
- The Queen of Fear (2018)
- Queen of the Gas Station (1963)
- Queen of Hearts: (1936, 1989 & 2019)
- The Queen of Hearts (2009)
- Queen High (1930)
- Queen of Housewives (2009)
- The Queen and I: (2008 & 2018)
- The Queen of Ireland (2015)
- A Queen Is Crowned (1953)
- The Queen Is in the Factory (2008)
- Queen of Katwe (2016)
- Queen Kelly (1929)
- Queen Kong (1976)
- The Queen of the Landstrasse (1948)
- Queen Louise: (1927 & 1957)
- Queen Margot: (1954 & 1994)
- Queen Mimi (2015)
- Queen of the Mob (1940)
- Queen of Montreuil (2012)
- Queen of the Morning Calm (2019)
- The Queen Mother (1916)
- The Queen of Moulin Rouge (1926)
- Queen of the Mountain (2005)
- Queen of the Mountains (2014)
- The Queen of Navarre (1942)
- Queen of the Night: (1931 German, 1931 Italian, 1951, 2001 & 2013)
- The Queen of the Night (1994)
- Queen of the Night Clubs (1929)
- Queen o'Diamonds (1926)
- Queen of Outer Space (1958)
- Queen of the Pirates (1960)
- Queen to Play (2009)
- Queen of Reversals (2010)
- Queen of the Ring (2024)
- Queen of the Road (1984)
- Queen Sacrifice (1988)
- Queen of the Scala (1937)
- Queen of the Sea (1918)
- Queen of the Seas (1961)
- The Queen of Sheba: (1921 & 1952)
- The Queen of Sheba's Pearls (2004)
- Queen Sized (2008)
- Queen & Slim (2019)
- The Queen of Spades: (1910, 1916, 1927, 1949, 1960, 1982 & 2016)
- The Queen of Spain (2016)
- The Queen of Sparta (1931)
- Queen of Sports (1934)
- Queen of the Stardust Ballroom (1975)
- The Queen of the Stock Exchange (1918)
- Queen of the Streets (1921)
- Queen of the Sun (2010)
- Queen of the Tabarin Club (1960)
- Queen of Temple Street (1990)
- The Queen of Versailles (2012)
- The Queen Was in the Parlour (1927)
- The Queen of Whitechapel (1922)
- Queen X (1917)
- Queen of the Yukon (1940)
- Queenie of Hollywood (1931)
- Queenpins (2021)
- Queens (2005)
- The Queens (2015)
- The Queens of Comedy (2001)
- Queens of the Dead (2025)
- Queens of Langkasuka (2008)
- Queens Logic (1991)
- Queensland (1976)
- Queen's Evidence (1919)
- The Queen's Affair (1934)
- The Queen's Corgi (2019)
- The Queen's Flower (1946)
- The Queen's Flower Girl (1940)
- The Queen's Guards (1961)
- The Queen's Love Letter (1916)
- The Queen's Necklace: (1929 & 1946)
- A Queen's Ransom (1976)
- The Queen's Secretary (1916)
- The Queen's Sister (2005)
- Queer (2024)
- Queer Boys and Girls on the Shinkansen (or ... on the Bullet Train) (2004)
- Queer Cargo (1938)
- Queer China (2008)
- Queer Duck: The Movie (2006)
- Queer Hutterite (2016)
- Queer Japan (2019)
- Queercore: How to Punk a Revolution (2017)
- Quel fantasma di mio marito (1950)
- Quel movimento che mi piace tanto (1977)
- Quelle drôle de gosse! (1935)
- Quelli che soffrono per voi (1951)
- Quem Matou Pixote? (1996)
- Quemar las Naves (2007)
- Querelle (1982)
- Quest: (1996, 2006 & 2017)
- The Quest: (1958 short & 1996)
- Quest for Camelot (1998)
- Quest for Fire (1981)
- The Quest for Freedom (1992)
- Quest for Love: (1971 & 1988)
- The Quest of Life (1916)
- Quest for Zhu (2011)
- Quest for the Lost City (1955)
- Quest for the Mighty Sword (1990)
- Quest of the Delta Knights (1993)
- Questa volta parliamo di uomini (1965)
- Questi giorni (2016)
- Questi pazzi, pazzi italiani (1965)
- Question 7 (1961)
- A Question of Adultery (1958)
- Question in Details (2010)
- A Question of Faith (2017)
- A Question of the Heart (2009)
- A Question of Honor: (1915 & 1922)
- A Question of Honour (1965)
- A Question of Silence (1982)
- A Question of Taste (2000)
- A Question of Trust (1920)
- Questions à la terre natale (2006)
- Questo amore ai confini del mondo (1960)
- Questo e Quello (1983)
- Questo pazzo, pazzo mondo della canzone (1965)
- The Questor Tapes (1974)
- Quetta: A City of Forgotten Dreams (2016)

==== Qui ====
- Qui c'est les plus forts? (2015)
- Qui comincia l'avventura (1975)
- Quick: (1932 & 2011)
- Quick Change: (1990 & 2013)
- The Quick and the Dead: (1963, 1987 & 1995)
- Quick Gun Murugun (2009)
- Quick Millions: (1931 & 1939)
- Quick Money (1937)
- Quick Pick (2006)
- Quick Trigger Lee (1931)
- Quick Triggers (1928)
- The Quick and the Undead (2006)
- Quick, Before It Melts (1964)
- Quick, Let's Get Married (1964)
- Quicker'n a Wink (1940)
- Quickie Express (2007)
- Quicksand: (1918, 1950, 2002 & 2003)
- Quicksand: No Escape (1992)
- Quicksands: (1913 & 1923)
- Quicksilver (1986)
- Quicksilver Highway (1997)
- Quid Pro Quo (2008)
- Quiéreme porque me muero (1953)
- Quiero llenarme de ti (1969)
- Quiero ser (I want to be...) (2000)
- The Quiet (2005)
- The Quiet American: (1958 & 2002)
- Quiet Bliss (2014)
- Quiet City (2007)
- Quiet Chaos (2008)
- Quiet Comes the Dawn (2019)
- Quiet Cool (1986)
- A Quiet Day in Belfast (1974)
- Quiet Days in August (1991)
- Quiet Days in Clichy: (1970 & 1990)
- Quiet Days in Hollywood (1997)
- A Quiet Dream (2016)
- The Quiet Duel (1949)
- The Quiet Earth (1985)
- The Quiet Family (1998)
- The Quiet Girl (2022)
- The Quiet Gun (1957)
- The Quiet Hour (2014)
- Quiet Killer (1992)
- Quiet Killing (2018)
- A Quiet Life (2010)
- A Quiet Little Marriage (2008)
- A Quiet Little Wedding (1913)
- The Quiet Man (1952)
- Quiet Night In (2005)
- Quiet Nights of Blood and Pain (2009)
- The Quiet Ones: (2010 & 2014)
- A Quiet Passion (2016)
- A Quiet Place series:
  - A Quiet Place (2018)
  - A Quiet Place Part II (2020)
  - A Quiet Place: Day One (2024)
- A Quiet Place in the Country (1968)
- A Quiet Place to Kill (1970)
- Quiet Please, Murder (1942)
- Quiet Riot - Well Now You're Here (2015)
- The Quiet Room (1996)
- The Quiet Storm (2007)
- A Quiet Street (1922)
- Quiet Wedding (1941)
- A Quiet Week in the House (1969)
- Quiet Weekend (1946)
- Quiet Zone (2015)
- Quigley (2003)
- Quigley Down Under (1990)
- Quill (2004)
- The Quiller Memorandum (1966)
- Quills (2000)
- Quilombo (1984)
- Quinceañera (2006)
- La Quinceañera (2007)
- Quincy (2018)
- Quincy Adams Sawyer (1922)
- Quincy's Quest (1979)
- Quinneys: (1919 & 1927)
- Quintet (1979)
- Quints (2000 TV)
- Quisiera Ser Hombre (1988)
- Quit Staring at My Plate (2016)
- Quitters (2015)
- Quitting (2001)
- Quiz Show (1994)

==== Quo–Qur ====
- Quo Vadis: (1913, 1924, 1951 & 2001)
- Quo Vadis, Aida? (2020)
- Quo Vadis, Baby? (2005)
- Quo Vado? (2016)
- Quod Erat Demonstrandum (2013)
- Quota (2020)
- Qurbaani (2000)
- Qurbani (1980)
- Qurbani Jatt Di (1990)
- Qurbani Rang Layegi (1991)

== R ==
- R (2010)
- R100 (2013)
- R2B: Return to Base (2012)
- R-Point (2004)
- R... Rajkumar (2013)
- REC series:
  - REC (2007)
  - REC 2 (2009)
  - REC 3: Genesis (2012)
  - REC 4: Apocalypse (2014)
- RFK (2002)
- RFK Must Die (2007)
- R.I.P.D. (2013)
- RK Nagar (2019)
- RKO 281 (1999)
- The R.M. (2003)
- R.O.T.O.R. (1989)
- RPM (1998)
- R. P. M. (1970)
- RR (2007)
- RRR (2022)
- RSVP (1991)
- R.S.V.P.: (1984 & 2002)
- RV (2006)
- RV: Resurrected Victims (2017)

=== Ra ===
- Ra: (1972 & 2014)
- Ra Choi (2006)
- Ra Daniel Dawal Migel 3 (2004)
- Ra.One (2011)
- Ra Ra... Krishnayya (2014)

==== Raa ====
- Raa (2001)
- Raa Raa: (2011 & 2018)
- Raabta (2017)
- Raadha Aur Seeta (1979)
- Raag (2014)
- Raag Desh (2017)
- Raaga (2017)
- Raaga Deepam (1982)
- Raagam (1975)
- Raagam Thaanam Pallavi (1980)
- Raagangal Maaruvathillai (1983)
- Raaj (2011)
- Raaj Mahal (1982)
- Raaj the Showman (2009)
- Raaj Tilak (1984)
- Raaja (1975)
- Raaja Raajathan (1989)
- Raajakumara (2017)
- Raajaveedhi (1979)
- Raajavembaala (1984)
- Raajjiyam (2002)
- Raajneeti (2010)
- Raakh: (1989, 2010 & 2016)
- Raakhandaar (2014)
- Raakhi Ki Saugandh (1979)
- Raakilipattu (2007)
- Raakuyil (1973)
- Raam: (2005, 2006 & 2009)
- Raama Raavanan (2010)
- Raamanam (2009)
- Raambo 2 (2018)
- Raamdhenu (2011)
- Raampur Ka Lakshman (1972)
- Raani Samyuktha (1962)
- Raanjhanaa (2013)
- Raasaiyya (1995)
- Raasaleela (1975)
- Raasave Unnai Nambi (1988)
- Raashtram (2006)
- Raasi (1997)
- Raasta: (2003 & 2017)
- Raaste Kaa Patthar (1972)
- Raaste Pyar Ke (1982)
- Raasukutti (1992)
- Raat (1992)
- Raat Aur Din (1967)
- Raat Bhar (2014)
- Raat Bhore (1955)
- Raat Gayi, Baat Gayi? (2009)
- Raat Ke Rahi (1959)
- Raatchasi (2019)
- Raathrikal Ninakku Vendi (1979)
- Raathriyile Yaathrakkaar (1976)
- Raaton Ka Raja (1970)
- Raattinam (2012)
- Raavan: (1984 & 2010)
- Raavanan (2010)
- Raavanaprabhu (2001)
- Raaz: (1967, 1981 & 2002)
- Raaz 3D (2012)
- Raaz: Reboot (2016)
- Raaz: The Mystery Continues (2009)
- Raazi (2018)

==== Rab ====
- Rab Ne Bana Di Jodi (2008)
- Rabat (2011)
- Rabb Da Radio (2017)
- Rabb Da Radio 2 (2019)
- Rabba Main Kya Karoon (2013)
- The Rabbi's Cat (2011)
- Rabbit à la Berlin (2009)
- Rabbit Every Monday (1951)
- Rabbit Fever (2009)
- Rabbit Fire (1951)
- Rabbit Hero (2015)
- Rabbit Hole (2011)
- Rabbit Hood (1949)
- The Rabbit Is Me (1965)
- The Rabbit Man (1990)
- Rabbit Punch (1948)
- Rabbit Rampage (1955)
- Rabbit Romeo (1957)
- Rabbit Seasoning (1952)
- Rabbit of Seville (1950)
- Rabbit Test (1978)
- Rabbit Transit (1947)
- Rabbit Trap (2025)
- The Rabbit Trap (1959)
- Rabbit Without Ears (2007)
- Rabbit Without Ears 2 (2009)
- Rabbit-Proof Fence (2002)
- Rabbit, Run (1970)
- Rabbit's Feat (1960)
- Rabbit's Kin (1952)
- Rabbit's Moon (1950)
- Rabbits (2002)
- Rabbitson Crusoe (1956)
- Rabhasa (2014)
- Rabid: (1977 & 2019)
- Rabid Dogs: (1974 & 2015)
- Rabid Grannies (1988)
- Rabid Rider (2010)
- Rabies: (1958 & 2010)
- Rabin, the Last Day (2015)
- Rabindranath Tagore (1961)
- Raboliot (1946)

==== Rac ====
- Race: (2007, 2011, 2013 & 2016)
- The Race: (1916 & 2002)
- Race series:
  - Race (2008)
  - Race 2 (2013)
  - Race 3 (2018)
- Race for the Bomb (1987)
- Race with the Devil (1975)
- Race to Freedom: Um Bok Dong (2019)
- Race for Glory (1989)
- Race Gurram (2014)
- Race to Nowhere (2009)
- Race Riot (1929)
- The Race for Space (1959)
- Race to Space (2002)
- Race Street (1948)
- Race the Sun (1996)
- The Race to the Throne (1919)
- Race to Witch Mountain (2009)
- Race for the Yankee Zephyr (1981)
- Race for Your Life, Charlie Brown (1977)
- Racek má zpoždění (1950)
- Racer and the Jailbird (2017)
- Racetime (2018)
- Racetrack (1933)
- Racha (2012)
- Rachana (1983)
- Rachel (2009)
- Rachel Carson (2017)
- The Rachel Divide (2018)
- Rachel Getting Married (2008)
- Rachel and the Stranger (1948)
- Rachel, Rachel (1968)
- Racing Blood (1954)
- Racing Dreams (2009)
- Racing Hearts (1923)
- Racing Lady (1937)
- Racing Luck: (1935, 1941 & 1948)
- Racing with the Moon (1984)
- Racing Romance: (1926 & 1937)
- The Racing Scene (1969)
- Racing Stripes (2005)
- Racing for Time (2008)
- Racing Youth (1932)
- The Racket: (1928 & 1951)
- Racket Busters (1938)
- Racket Girls (1951)
- The Racketeer (1929)
- Racketeer Rabbit (1946)
- Rackety Rax (1932)
- Racquet (1979)

==== Rad–Raf ====
- Rad (1986)
- Radar Station (1953)
- Le Radeau de la Méduse (1994)
- Radha (2017)
- Radha Enna Pennkutti (1979)
- Radha Gopalam (2005)
- Radha Ka Sangam (1992)
- Radha Kalyanam: (1935 & 1981)
- Radha Krishna (1933)
- Radha Madhavam (1990)
- Radha My Darling (1982)
- Radha Ramana (1943)
- Radhan Ganda (2013)
- Radhe: (2017, 2021 & TBD)
- Radiance: (1998 & 2017)
- Radiance: The Experience of Light (1978)
- Radiant City (2006)
- Radiator (2014)
- Radical Act (1995)
- Radical Harmonies (2002)
- Radin! (2016)
- Radio: (2003, 2009 & 2013)
- Radio Bar (1936)
- Radio Bikini (1988)
- Radio Bugs (1944)
- Radio Cab Murder (1954)
- Radio Cape Cod (2008)
- Radio City Revels (1938)
- Radio Corazon (2007)
- Radio Day (2008)
- Radio Days (1987)
- Radio Dayz (2008)
- Radio Dreams (2016)
- Radio Flyer (1992)
- Radio Free Albemuth (2010)
- Radio Inside (1994)
- Radio Lover (1936)
- Radio Magic (1927)
- Radio On (1979)
- Radio Parade of 1935 (1934)
- Radio Patrol (1932)
- Radio Pirates (1935)
- Radio Rebel (2012)
- Radio Rhythm (1931)
- Radio Star (2006)
- Radio Stars on Parade (1945)
- Radio Stories (1955)
- Radio Surprises (1940)
- Radioactive (2019)
- Radioactive Dreams (1985)
- Radioland Murders (1994)
- Radius (2017)
- Raees: (1976 & 2017)
- Raf (2019)
- Rafaël (2018)
- Rafea: Solar Mama (2012)
- Rafferty (1980)
- Rafferty and the Gold Dust Twins (1975)
- The Raffle (1991)
- Raffles: (1930, 1939 & 1958)
- Raffles, the Amateur Cracksman: (1917 & 1925)
- Rafiki (2018)
- Rafoo Chakkar (1975)
- The Raft of the Dead (1921)
- Raftaar (1975)
- Rafťáci (2006)
- Rafter Romance (1933)

==== Rag ====
- Rag Ball (1930)
- Rag Doll (1961)
- The Rag Man (1925)
- Rag Tag (2006)
- Rag Tale (2005)
- Rag Union (2015)
- The Rag-Picker (1896)
- Raga (1971)
- Ragalaipuram (2013)
- The Ragamuffin (1916)
- Ragan (1968)
- Ragasiya Police (1995)
- Ragasiya Police 115 (1968)
- Ragasiyamai (2003)
- Ragavan (2009)
- Ragazza alla pari (1976)
- Ragazze da marito (1952)
- Ragazzi del Juke-Box (1959)
- Ragdoll (1999)
- Rage: (1966, 1972, 1997, 1999, 2006, 2009 American, 2009 Spanish, 2014 & 2016)
- The Rage: (1997, 2002, 2007, 2008)
- Rage of the Buccaneers (1961)
- Rage at Dawn (1955)
- A Rage in Harlem (1991)
- Rage in Heaven (1941)
- Rage of Honor (1987)
- A Rage to Live (1965)
- The Rage of Paris: (1921 & 1938)
- The Rage in Placid Lake (2003)
- Rage of the Yeti (2011)
- The Rage: Carrie 2 (1999)
- Raggare! (1959)
- The Ragged Edge (1923)
- The Ragged Messenger (1917)
- The Ragged Princess (1916)
- Raggedy Ann & Andy: A Musical Adventure (1977)
- Raggedy Ann and Raggedy Andy (1941)
- Raggedy Man (1981)
- The Raggedy Rawney (1988)
- Raggedy Rose (1926)
- Ragging (1973)
- Raghavendra (2003)
- Raghu Romeo (2003)
- Raghupathi Raghavan Rajaram (1977)
- Raghupati Raghav Rajaram (2015)
- Raghuvamsham (1978)
- Raghuvinte Swantham Raziya (2011)
- Ragile Jwala (1981)
- Raging Barbora (1935)
- Raging Bull (1980)
- Raging Fire (2021)
- Raging Fists (1975)
- The Raging Moon (1971)
- Raging Phoenix (2009)
- Raging Sharks (2005)
- Raging Sun, Raging Sky (2009)
- The Raging Tide (1951)
- Ragini (1968)
- Ragini MMS series:
  - Ragini MMS (2011)
  - Ragini MMS 2 (2014)
- The Ragman's Daughter (1972)
- Rags: (1915 & 2012)
- Rags to Riches: (1922 & 1941)
- Rags and Silk (1925)
- Rags and Tatters (2013)
- Ragtime: (1927 & 1981)
- Ragtime Cowboy Joe (1940)
- Ragtime Snap Shots (1915)
- Raguluthunna Bharatham (1992)

==== Rah–Rai ====
- Rahaei (1982/83)
- Rahasya (2015)
- Rahasya Police (2009)
- Rahasya Rathri (1980)
- Rahasyam: (1967 & 1969)
- Rahasyarathri (1974)
- Rahe Chardi Kala Punjab Di (2012)
- Rahi (1952)
- Rahm (2016)
- Rahtree Reborn (2009)
- Rahu Ketu (1978)
- Rahul (2001)
- Rahul's Arranged Marriage (2005)
- RahXephon: Pluralitas Concentio (2003)
- Raid: (1921, 1947, 2003 & 2018)
- The Raid 2 (2014)
- The Raid: Redemption (2011)
- Raid on Entebbe (1977 TV)
- Raid on Rommel (1971)
- Raid in St. Pauli (1932)
- Raiden (1928)
- The Raiders: (1952 & 1963)
- Raiders from Beneath the Sea (1964)
- Raiders of Old California (1957)
- Raiders of the Living Dead (1986)
- Raiders of the Lost Ark (1981)
- Raiders of San Joaquin (1943)
- Raiders of Sunset Pass (1943)
- The Railroad (2007)
- Railroad Tigers (2016)
- Railroaded! (1947)
- The Railway Children: (1970 & 2000 TV)
- The Railway Man (2013)
- Rain: (1929, 1932, 2001 (NZ), 2001 (US), 2005, 2006, 2008 & 2016)
- Rain Clouds over Wushan (1995)
- Rain Man (1988)
- The Rain People (1969)
- Rainbow: (1921, 1944, 1978 TV, 1996, 2005 & 2008)
- The Rainbow: (1917, 1929, 1989 & 2016)
- Rainbow Bird and Monster Man (2002)
- Rainbow Brite and the Star Stealer (1985)
- Rainbow Song (2006)
- Rainbow's Sunset (2018)
- Raincoat (2004)
- Raining in the Mountain (1979)
- The Rainmaker: (1956 & 1997)
- The Rains Came (1939)
- The Rains of Ranchipur (1955)
- Raintree County (1957)
- A Rainy Day in New York (2019)
- Rainy Dog (1997)
- Rainy Seasons (2010)
- Raise the Red Lantern (1991)
- Raise the Roof (1930)
- Raise the Titanic (1980)
- Raise Your Voice (2004)
- A Raisin in the Sun: (1961 & 2008)
- Raising Arizona (1987)
- Raising Bertie (2016)
- Raising Buchanan (2019)
- Raising Cain (1992)
- Raising Helen (2004)
- Raising Jeffrey Dahmer (2006)
- Raising the Roof (1972)
- Raising Victor Vargas (2003)
- Raising the Wind: (1925 & 1961)

==== Raj ====
- Raj Nartaki (1941)
- Raj Tilak (1958)
- Raj Vishnu (2017)
- Raja: (1943, 1972, 1995, 1999, 2002 & 2003)
- Raja Aur Runk (1968)
- Raja Babu (1994)
- Raja Bakthi (1960)
- Raja Bersiong (1968)
- Raja Bhaiya (2003)
- Raja Cheyyi Vesthe (2016)
- Raja Chinna Roja (1989)
- Raja Dangdut (1978)
- Raja Desingu (1960)
- Raja Enga Raja (1995)
- Raja Harishchandra (1913)
- Raja Hindustani (1996)
- Raja Horu (2013)
- Raja Huli (2013)
- Raja Jani (1972)
- Raja Jhia Sathe Heigala Bhaba (2012)
- Raja Kaiya Vacha (1990)
- Raja Kempu Roja (1990)
- Raja Ki Aayegi Baraat (1996)
- Raja Ko Rani Se Pyar Ho Gaya (2000)
- Raja Kumarudu (1999)
- Raja Makutam (1960)
- Raja Malaya Simha (1959)
- Raja Mamai (2016)
- Raja Manthiri (2016)
- Raja Mariyadhai (1987)
- Raja Mukthi (1948)
- Raja Muthirai (1995)
- Raja Nagam (1974)
- Raja Nandini (1958)
- Raja Nanna Raja (1976)
- Raja Narasimha (2003)
- Raja Natwarlal (2014)
- Raja Paarvai (1981)
- Raja Pandi (1994)
- Raja Rajan (1957)
- Raja Rajendra (2015)
- Raja Ramesh (1977)
- Raja Ranguski (2018)
- Raja Rani: (1942, 1956, 1973 & 2013)
- Raja Rani Badsha (1998)
- The Rajah: (1911 & 1919)
- Rajini Murugan (2015)

==== Rak–Ral ====
- Raketeros (2013)
- Rakhe Hari Mare Ke (2003)
- Rakhi: (1962 & 2006)
- Rakhi Aur Hathkadi (1972)
- Rakhi Aur Rifle (1976)
- Rakht (2004)
- Rakhtbeej (2012)
- Rakthabandham (1951)
- Rakhwala: (1971 & 2013)
- Rakhwale (1994)
- Rakka (2017)
- Rakkayi Koyil (1993)
- Rakkhosh (2019)
- Rakkuyilin Ragasadassil (1986)
- Raksha: (1982 & 2008)
- Raksha Rekha (1949)
- Rakshadhikari Baiju Oppu (2017)
- Rakshak (1996)
- Rakshas (2018)
- Rakshasa (2005)
- Rakshasa Rajavu (2001)
- Rakshassu (1984)
- Rakshasudu: (1986 & 2019)
- Rakta Bandham (1980)
- Rakta Bandhan (1984)
- Rakta Charitra (2010)
- Rakta Golapa (1977)
- Rakta Sambandham (1962)
- Rakta Sindhuram (1985)
- Raktabhishekam (1988)
- Raktamukhi Neela (2008)
- Raktha Kanneeru (2003)
- Raktha Sakshi (1982)
- Raktha Tilakam (1988)
- Rakthabandham (1951)
- Raktham (1981)
- Rakthamillatha Manushyan (1979)
- Rakthapushpam (1970)
- Raktharakshassu 3D (2014)
- Raktokorobi (2017)
- Rakugo Eiga (2013)
- Rakugo Story (2012)
- Rally 'Round the Flag, Boys! (1958)
- Ralph Breaks the Internet (2018)

==== Ram ====
- Ram Dass, Going Home (2017)
- Ram Jaane (1995)
- Ram Laxman (2004)
- Ram Rajya: (1943 & 1967)
- Ram Ram Gangaram (1977)
- Ram Tere Kitne Naam (1985)
- Ram Teri Ganga Maili (1985)
- Rama Krishnulu (1978)
- Rama Madhav (2014)
- Rama O Rama (1988)
- Rama Paduka Pattabhishekam (1932)
- Rama Parushurama (1980)
- Rama Rama Krishna Krishna (2010)
- Rama Rama Kya Hai Dramaa? (2008)
- Rama Rama Raghu Rama (2011)
- Rama Rama Re... (2016)
- Rama Shama Bhama (2005)
- Ramaa: The Saviour (2010)
- Ramabai (2016)
- Ramabai Bhimrao Ambedkar (2011)
- Ramachaari (1991)
- Ramachandra (2003)
- Ramadasu (1964)
- Ramaiya Vastavaiya (2013)
- Ramakrishna: (2004 Kannada & 2004 Tamil)
- Ramalayam (1971)
- Ramaleela (2017)
- Raman (2008)
- Raman Abdullah (1997)
- Raman Ethanai Ramanadi (1970)
- Raman Parasuraman (1980)
- Raman Raghav 2.0 (2016)
- Raman Sreeraman (1985)
- Raman Thediya Seethai: (1972 & 2008)
- Ramanaa (2002)
- Ramanan (1967)
- Ramanna Shamanna (1988)
- Ramante Edanthottam (2017)
- Ramanujacharya (1989)
- Ramanujan (2014)
- Ramapurada Ravana (1984)
- Ramarajyadalli Rakshasaru (1990)
- Ramarajyamlo Bheemaraju (1983)
- Ramata (2007)
- Ramayan (1954)
- Ramayana: The Epic (2010)
- Ramayana: The Legend of Prince Rama (1992)
- Ramanyanam (1996)
- Ramayanam Lo Tuppakula Veta (2016)
- Ramayani (1945)
- Ramayya Vasthavayya (2013)
- Rambaan (1948)
- Rambaiyin Kaadhal: (1939 & 1956)
- Rambantu (1996)
- Rambha Rambabu (1990)
- Rambhajjan Zindabaad (TBD)
- Rambling Rose (1991)
- Rambo series:
  - Rambo: First Blood Part II (1985)
  - Rambo III (1988)
  - Rambo (2007)
  - Rambo: Last Blood (2019)
- Ramchand Pakistani (2008)
- Ramdhanu (2014)
- Ramen Teh (2018)
- Rameswaram (2007)
- Ramgarh Ke Sholay (1991)
- Ramin (2011)
- Ramji Londonwaley (2005)
- Ramji Rao Speaking (1989)
- Ramkinkar Baij (unreleased)
- Ramleela (2015)
- Rammbock (2010)
- Ramona: (1910, 1916, 1928, 1936, 1946 & 1961)
- Ramona and Beezus (2010)
- Rampage: (1963, 1986, 1987, 2006, 2009 & 2018)
- Rampage: Capital Punishment (2014)
- Rampage: President Down (2016)
- Rampart (2012)
- Rampo (1994)
- Ramrod (1947)
- Rams: (2015, 2018 & 2020)
- Ramshackle House (1924)
- Ramshastri (1944)
- Ramta Jogi (2015)

==== Ran ====
- Ran (1985)
- Ran Kevita (2007)
- Ran Kevita 2 (2013)
- Ran Salu (1967)
- Ran Sayura (2017)
- Rana Vikrama (2015)
- Rana's Wedding (2002)
- Ranachandi (1991)
- Ranadheera (1988)
- Ranadheera Kanteerava (1960)
- Ranam: (2006 & 2018)
- Ranaranga (1988)
- Ranbanka (2015)
- Ranbhool (2010)
- Ranbhoomi (1991)
- Ranchi Diaries (2017)
- Rancho Deluxe (1975)
- Rancho Grande (1940)
- Rancho Notorious (1952)
- Rancid (2004)
- Rancid Aluminium (2000)
- Ranczo Wilkowyje (2007)
- Randidangazhi (1958)
- Randiya Dahara (2004)
- Random Acts of Violence (2019)
- Random Encounter (1998)
- Random Encounters (2013)
- Random Harvest (1942)
- Random Hearts (1999)
- Randu Janmam (1978)
- Randu Lokam (1977)
- Randu Penkuttikal (1978)
- Randy and the Mob (2007)
- Rang: (1993 & 2014)
- Rang Birangi (1983)
- Rang De Basanti (2006)
- Rang Milanti (2011)
- Rang Rasiya (2008)
- Ranga: (1982 & 2022)
- Ranga Daku (1978)
- Ranga Khush (1975)
- Ranga Rattinam (1971)
- Ranga The Donga (2010)
- Ranga SSLC (2004)
- Rangaa Patangaa (2016)
- Rangam (1985)
- Rangamati (2008)
- Rangan Style (2014)
- Ranganayaki (1981)
- Rangappa Hogbitna (2011)
- Rangasthalam (2018)
- Range War (1939)
- Rango (2011)
- Ransom (1996)
- Ransom! (1956)

==== Rao–Raq ====
- Rao Gari Illu (1988)
- Rao Gari Intlo Rowdy (1990)
- Rao Saheb (1985)
- Raoni (1978)
- Raoul Wallenberg: Buried Alive (1983)
- Rapa Nui (1994)
- Rapado (1992)
- Rape (1971)
- Rape of the Belt (1964)
- Rape Culture (1975)
- The Rape of Europa (2007)
- Rape of Love (1978)
- Rape and Marriage: The Rideout Case (1980 TV)
- Rape Me (2000)
- Rape Squad (1974)
- Rape of the Sword (1967)
- Raped by an Angel (1993)
- Raped by an Angel 2: The Uniform Fan (1998)
- Raped with Eyes: Daydream (1982)
- Raphael, or The Debauched One (1971)
- Rapid Fire: (1989, 1992 & 2006 TV)
- Rapid Fire Romance (1926)
- Rappadikalude Gatha (1978)
- Rappakal (2005)
- Rappin' (1985)
- Rapsodia Bałtyku (1935)
- Rapt (2009)
- Raptor (2001)
- Raptor Ranch (2012)
- Rapture: (1950 & 1965)
- The Rapture (1991)
- Rapture-Palooza (2013)
- Raqeeb (2007)
- Raqt (2013)

==== Rar–Ras ====
- Rara (2016)
- Raraju: (1984 & 2006)
- Rarandoi Veduka Chudham (2017)
- Rare Beasts (2019)
- Rare Birds (2001)
- The Rare Breed (1966)
- Rare Exports: A Christmas Tale (2010)
- Rarichan Enna Pauran (1956)
- Rasaleela (2012)
- Rasam (2015)
- Rasathanthram (2006)
- Rasathi Varum Naal (1991)
- Rascal (1969)
- Rascal Does Not Dream of a Dreaming Girl (2019)
- Rascals: (1938 & 2011)
- Rascals on the Road (2005)
- Rascals and Robbers: The Secret Adventures of Tom Sawyer and Huckleberry Finn (1982 TV)
- Rasen (1998)
- Rasganço (2001)
- RASH (2005)
- Rashōmon (1950)
- Rashtram (2006)
- Rasigan (1994)
- Rasigar Mandram (2007)
- Rasika (1994)
- Rasikan (2004)
- Rasikkum Seemane (2010)
- Rasili (1946)
- Raskolnikow (1923)
- Rasmus, Pontus och Toker (1966)
- The Raspberry Reich (2004)
- Raspoutine (2011)
- Rasputin: (1928, 1938, 1954, 2011 & 2015)
- Rasputin, the Black Monk (1917)
- Rasputin: Dark Servant of Destiny (1996)
- Rasputin, Demon with Women (1932)
- Rasputin and the Empress (1932)
- Rasputin, the Holy Sinner (1928)
- Rasputin the Mad Monk (1966)

==== Rat ====
- Rat (2000)
- The Rat Pack (1998 TV)
- Rat Pack Rat (2014)
- Rat Pfink a Boo Boo (1966)
- Rat Race (2001)
- Rat Rod Rockers! (2010)
- The Rat Savior (1976)
- Rat Trap (1963)
- Ratanpur (2018)
- Ratatoing (2007)
- Ratatouille (2007)
- Ratboy (1986)
- Ratcatcher (1999)
- Ratchagan (1997)
- Ratchet & Clank (2016)
- Rated X (2000)
- Ratha Kanneer (1954)
- Ratha Paasam: (1954 & 1980)
- Ratha Sapthami (1986)
- Ratha Thilagam (1963)
- Rathavara (2015)
- Rathilayam (1983)
- Rathimanmadhan (1977)
- Rathinapuri Ilavarasi (1960)
- Rathinirvedam: (1978 & 2011)
- Rathna (1998)
- Rathna Manjari (1962)
- Rathnagiri Rahasya (1957)
- Rathri Mazha (2007)
- Rathrivandi (1971)
- Raththa Dhanam (1988)
- The Ratings Game (1984 TV)
- Ration Bored (1943)
- Rationing (1944)
- Ratko: The Dictator's Son (2009)
- Ratman (1988)
- Ratna Deepam (1953)
- Ratna Moetoe Manikam (1940s)
- Ratnadeep (1979)
- Ratnakumar (1949)
- Ratnamala (1947)
- Ratnamanjarii (2019)
- Raton Pass (1951)
- Ratrir Jatri (2019)
- Rats (2016)
- Rats and Cats (2007)
- Rats: Night of Terror (1984)
- Rats in the Ranks (1996)
- Ratsasan (2018)
- Ratskin (1929)
- Rattan (1944)
- Ratter (2015)
- Rattle the Cage (2015)
- Rattle and Hum (1988)
- Rattle of a Simple Man (1964)
- Rattlers (1976)
- Rattlesnake (2019)
- Ratty (1986)
- Ratón de ferretería (1985)
- El Ratón Pérez (2006)

==== Rau–Raz ====
- Raul: Straight to Kill (2005)
- Ravager (1997)
- Ravagers (1979)
- Ravan Raaj: A True Story (1995)
- Ravana Desam (2013)
- Ravanan: (1994 & 2006)
- Ravanna (2000)
- Ravanude Ramudayithe? (1979)
- Rave (2000)
- Raven (1996)
- The Raven: (1915, 1935, 1963, 2006 & 2012)
- Raven Hawk (1996 TV)
- Raven's End (1963)
- Ravens (2017)
- Ravenous: (1999 & 2017)
- Ravex in Tezuka World (2009)
- Ravimama (1999)
- Raving (2007)
- Raving Iran (2016)
- Ravished Armenia (1919)
- Ravivarma (1992)
- Raw (2016)
- Raw Deal: (1948, 1977 & 1986)
- Raw Edge (1956)
- Raw Force (1982)
- Raw Justice (1994)
- Raw Nerve: (1990, 1991 & 1999)
- Raw Opium (2011)
- Raw! Raw! Rooster! (1956)
- Raw Silk (1988)
- Raw Timber (1937)
- Raw Wind in Eden (1958)
- Rawhead Rex (1987)
- Rawhide: (1926, 1938 & 1951)
- Rawhide Mail (1934)
- Rawhide Rangers (1941)
- Ray (2004)
- Ray Donovan: The Movie (2022 TV)
- Ray Harryhausen: Special Effects Titan (2011)
- Ray & Liz (2018)
- Ray Meets Helen (2017)
- Ray of Sunshine (1919)
- Ray's Male Heterosexual Dance Hall (1987)
- Raya and the Last Dragon (2021)
- Rayaru Bandaru Mavana Manege (1993)
- Rayilukku Neramachu (1988)
- Raymond & Ray (2022)
- Rayudugaru Nayudugaru (1996)
- Raze (2013)
- Razing the Bar (2014)
- Raziya Sultan (1983)
- Razor Blade Smile (1998)
- The Razor's Edge: (1946 & 1984)
- Razor's Edge: The Legacy of Iranian Actresses (2016)
- Razorback (1984)
- Razzia (2017)
- Razzia sur la chnouf (1955)
- Razzle Dazzle: A Journey into Dance (2007)

=== Re ===
- ...Re (2016)
- Re-Animated (2006)
- Re-Animator (1985)
- ReBoot: Daemon Rising (2001)
- ReBoot: My Two Bobs (2001)
- Re:Born (2016)
- Re-cycle (2006)
- ReGeneration (2010)
- Re-Kill (2015)
- ReLIFE (2017)
- Re Ru (1999)
- ReWined (2013)

==== Rea ====
- Reach for Glory (1962)
- Reach for Me (2008)
- Reach the Rock (1998)
- Reach for the Sky: (1956 & 2001)
- Reaching from Heaven (1948)
- Reaching for the Moon: (1917, 1930 & 2013)
- Reaching for the Stars (1955)
- Reaching for the Sun (1941)
- Reaction: A Portrait of a Society in Crisis (1973)
- Read It and Weep (2006 TV)
- Read My Lips (2001)
- The Reader: (1988 & 2008)
- Readin' and Writin' (1932)
- Ready: (2008 & 2011)
- Ready Money (1914)
- Ready or Not: (2009 & 2019)
- Ready or Not 2: Here I Come (2026)
- Ready Player One (2018)
- Ready to Rumble (2000)
- Ready, Set, Zoom! (1955)
- Ready, Steady, Charlie! (2003)
- Ready, Willing, and Able (1937)
- Ready, Woolen and Able (1960)
- Reagan: (2011 & 2024)
- The Real Badlands (2009)
- The Real Blonde (1997)
- The Real Cancun (2003)
- Real Genius (1985)
- Real Life: (1979 & 2004)
- The Real McCoy (1993)
- A Real Pain (2024)
- Real Steel (2011)
- Real Women Have Curves (2002)
- A Real Young Girl (1976)
- Reality Bites (1994)
- Reality High (2017)
- A Really Haunted Loud House (2023)
- The Realm (2018)
- Reap the Wild Wind (1942)
- Reaper (2014)
- The Reaper: (2013 & 2014)
- The Reaping (2007)
- Rear Window (1954)
- Reasonable Doubt (2014)

==== Reb ====
- Rebecca: (1940, 1963, 2016 & 2020)
- Rebecca H. (Return to the Dogs) (2010)
- Rebecca of Sunnybrook Farm: (1917, 1932 & 1938)
- Rebecca Uthup Kizhakkemala (2013)
- Rebel: (1985, 2012 & 2014)
- The Rebel: (1915, 1931, 1932, 1961, 1980 French, 1980 Italian, 1993 & 2007)
- Rebel City (1953)
- Rebel Hearts (2021)
- Rebel High (1987)
- Rebel Liesel (1920)
- Rebel Love (1985)
- Rebel Moon - Part One: A Child of Fire (2023)
- Rebel Moon - Part Two: The Scargiver (2024)
- Rebel in Paradise (1960)
- Rebel Rabbit (1949)
- Rebel Scum (2015)
- The Rebel Rousers (1970)
- Rebel in the Rye (2017)
- Rebel in Town (1956)
- Rebel Without Claws (1961)
- Rebel Without a Cause (1955)
- Rebel Without a House (1960)
- Rebelión en los llanos (1953)
- Rebellion: (1936, 1954, 1975, 2009 & 2011)
- Rebellion: The Killing Isle (2008)
- Rebellion: the Litvinenko Case (2007)
- The Rebels (1979 TV)
- Rebels of the Neon God (1992)
- Rebirth: (2011 & 2016)
- Rebirth of Mothra (1996)
- Rebirth of Mothra II (1997)
- Rebirth of Mothra III (1998)
- Reborn (TBD)
- Rebound: (1931, 2005 & 2023)
- The Rebound: (2009 & 2016)
- Rebound: The Legend of Earl "The Goat" Manigault (1996 TV)
- Rebuilding (2025)
- Rebuilding Paradise (2020)

==== Rec ====
- Recalled (2021)
- Rec series:
  - Rec (2007)
  - Rec 2 (2009)
  - Rec 3: Genesis (2013)
  - Rec 4: Apocalypse (2014)
- Recep İvedik series:
  - Recep İvedik (2008)
  - Recep İvedik 2 (2009)
  - Recep İvedik 3 (2010)
  - Recep İvedik 4 (2014)
  - Recep İvedik 5 (2017)
  - Recep İvedik 6 (2019)
- Reception (2011)
- Recess series:
  - Recess: School's Out (2001)
  - Recess Christmas: Miracle on Third Street (2001)
  - Recess: All Growed Down (2003)
  - Recess: Taking the Fifth Grade (2003)
- Reckless: (1935, 1951, 1984, & 1995)
- Reckless Disregard (1985)
- Reckless Kelly (1993)
- Reckless Living: (1931 & 1938)
- The Reckless Moment (1949)
- Reckless Roads (1935)
- Reckless Youth: (1922 & 1931)
- The Reckoning: (1908, 1932, 1970, 2003, 2014 & 2020)
- Reclaim (2014)
- Reclaim Wasteland (1926)
- Reclaim Your Brain (2007)
- Reclaiming the Blade (2009)
- Reclaiming Their Voice: The Native American Vote in New Mexico & Beyond (2009)
- Recollections of Pavlovsk (1984)
- Recollections of the Yellow House (1989)
- Reconstitution (1970)
- The Record (2000)
- The Record of a Tenement Gentleman (1947)
- The Recruit (2003)

==== Red ====
- Red: (1970, 2002, 2008, 2010 & 2021)
- RED 2 (2013)
- Red 11 (2019)
- Red Amnesia (2014)
- Red Angel (film) (1966)
- Red Army (2014)
- The Red Awn (2007)
- The Red Badge of Courage: (1951 & 1974 TV)
- The Red Balloon (1956)
- The Red Baron (2007)
- Red Beard (1965)
- Red Cherry (1995)
- Red Christmas (2016)
- The Red Circle (1970)
- Red Cliff (2008-2009)
- Red Corner (1997)
- Red Cow (2018)
- Red Dawn: (1984 & 2012)
- Red Desert (1964)
- Red Dog (2011)
- Red Dot (2021)
- Red Dragon: (1965 & 2002)
- The Red Dragon (1946)
- Red Dust: (1932, 1999 & 2004)
- Red Eye (2005)
- Red Firecracker, Green Firecracker (1994)
- Red Headed Stranger (1986)
- Red Heat: (1985 & 1988)
- Red Hill (2010)
- Red Hook Summer (2012)
- Red Hot Riding Hood (1943)
- The Red House (1947)
- The Red Inn: (1951 & 2007)
- Red Joan (2018)
- Red Lights: (1923, 2004 & 2012)
- The Red Menace (1949)
- Red Monarch (1983) (TV)
- The Red Monks (1989)
- Red Notice (2021)
- Red Planet (2000)
- The Red Pony: (1949 & 1973 TV)
- Red Post on Escher Street (2020)
- Red Psalm (1972)
- Red Riding Hood: (1901, 1989, 2003, 2006 & 2011)
- Red River: (1948 & 2009)
- Red River Range (1938)
- Red River Valley: (1941 & 1997)
- Red Road (2006)
- Red Rock West (1993)
- Red Rocket (2021)
- Red Rose White Rose (1994)
- Red Scorpion (1989)
- The Red Sea Diving Resort (2019)
- The Red Shoes: (1948, 2005 & 2010)
- Red Snow: (1952, 2019 & 2021)
- Red Sonja: (1985 & 2025)
- Red Sorghum (1988)
- Red Sparrow (2018)
- Red State: (2006 & 2011)
- Red Sun (1972)
- Red Sundown (1956)
- Red Tails (2012)
- The Red Turtle (2016)
- The Red Violin (1998)
- The Red and the White (1967)
- Red White & Blue (2010)
- Red, White & Royal Blue (2023)
- Red-Headed Woman (1932)
- Redacted (2007)
- Redbelt (2008)
- Redd Inc (2012)
- Redeeming Love: (1916 & 2022)
- The Redemption (1924)
- Redemption Road (2010)
- Redemption: The Stan Tookie Williams Story (2004) (TV)
- The Redhead from Wyoming (1953)
- Redline: (2007 & 2009)
- Redneck Zombies (1986)
- Reds (1981)
- Redskin (1929)
- Redux Redux (2026)

==== Ree–Ref ====
- The Reef: (1999 & 2010)
- The Reef 2: High Tide (2012)
- The Reef: Stalked (2022)
- Reefer Madness: (1936 & 2005 TV)
- Reefer and the Model (1988)
- Reeker (2006)
- Reel Bad Arabs (2006)
- Reel in the Closet (2015)
- Reel Love (2011 TV)
- Reel Zombies (2008)
- The Reenactment (1968)
- Reencuentro con la gloria (1962)
- The Ref (1994)
- The Referee (2010)
- Reference (1985)
- The Reflecting Skin (1990)
- Reflection: (2018 & 2021)
- A Reflection of Fear (1972)
- Reflections in Black (1975)
- Reflections on a Crime (1994)
- Reflections in Dark Glasses (1960 TV)
- Reflections in a Dark Sky (1991)
- Reflections in a Golden Eye (1967)
- Reflections of Murder (1974 TV)
- Reform School Girl: (1957 & 1994 TV)
- Reform School Girls (1986)
- Reformation (2015)
- The Reformation of the Suffragettes (1911)
- A Reformed Santa Claus (1911)
- The Reformer and the Redhead (1950)
- The Reformers (1916)
- The Refrigerator (1991)
- Refrigerator Mothers (2003 TV)
- Refuge: (1923 & 2012)
- The Refuge (2009)
- Refuge: Stories of the Selfhelp Home (2012)
- Refugee: (2000 & 2006)
- Refugees (1933)

==== Reg–Rem ====
- Reg'lar Fellers (1941)
- Regarding Henry (1991)
- Regarding Susan Sontag (2014 TV)
- Regel nr. 1 (2003)
- Regeneration: (1915 & 1997)
- ReGeneration (2010)
- Regina (1987)
- Regine: (1927, 1935 & 1956)
- Registered Nurse (1934)
- Regresa (2010)
- Regression (2015)
- Regret to Inform (1998)
- Regretting You (2025)
- Regular Guys (1996)
- Regular Lovers (2005)
- Regular Show: The Movie (2015)
- Rehearsal (2015)
- The Rehearsal (1974 & 2016)
- Rehearsal for Murder (1982 TV)
- Rehnaa Hai Terre Dil Mein (2001)
- Reichenbach Falls (2007)
- Reign of Assassins (2010)
- Reign Behind a Curtain (1983)
- Reign of Fire (2002)
- Reign of the Gargoyles (2007 TV)
- Reign Over Me (2007)
- Reign of the Supermen (2019)
- Reign of Terror (1949)
- Reina de reinas: La Virgen María (1948)
- Reincarnation (2006)
- The Reincarnation of Peter Proud (1975)
- Reindeer Games (2000)
- Reindeerspotting: Escape from Santaland (2010)
- Reise ins Ehebett (1966)
- Reisender Krieger (1981 TV)
- The Reivers (1969)
- Rejected (2000)
- The Rejected (1961)
- Rejection (2011)
- Rejuvenatrix (1988)
- Rekha (1943)
- Rekka (2016)
- Relaks, It's Just Pag-ibig (2014)
- Relationship Dilemma (2015)
- Relative Chaos (2006 TV)
- Relative Values (2000)
- Relatives: (1985 & 2006)
- Relax...It's Just Sex (1998)
- Relaxer (2018)
- Relay (2024)
- The Reliant (2019)
- Relic (2020)
- The Relic (1997)
- Religulous (2008)
- The Reluctant Astronaut (1967)
- The Reluctant Debutante (1958)
- The Reluctant Dragon (1941)
- The Reluctant Fundamentalist (2012)
- The Reluctant Sadist (1967)
- The Reluctant Saint (1962)
- The Remains of the Day (1993)
- Rembrandt (1936, 1940, 1942 & 1999)
- Remember: (1926, 2015 & 2022)
- Remember Last Night? (1935)
- Remember Me: (1979, 1985 TV, 2010, 2013 & 2019)
- Remember My Name (1978)
- Remember the Night (1940)
- Remember Pearl Harbor (1942)
- Remember the Titans (2000)
- Rememory (2017)
- Reminders of Him (2026)
- Reminiscence: (2017 & 2021)
- Reminiscences of a Journey to Lithuania (1972)
- Remo Williams: The Adventure Begins (1985)
- Remorse at Death (1948)
- Remote: (1993 & 2004)
- Remote Control: (1930, 1988 & 1992)

==== Ren ====
- Rena (1938)
- Renaissance: (1964 & 2006)
- Renaissance Man (1994)
- Renaldo and Clara (1978)
- Renart the Fox (2005)
- Rencontre avec le dragon (2003)
- Rendel (2017)
- Rendella Tharuvatha (2005)
- Rendez-vous (1985)
- Rendez-vous avec Maurice Chevalier n°1 (1954)
- Rendez-vous avec Maurice Chevalier n°2 (1954)
- Rendez-vous avec Maurice Chevalier n°3 (1954)
- Rendezvous: (1930 & 1935)
- Rendezvous with Annie (1946)
- Rendezvous at Bray (1971)
- Rendezvous at Corfu (1960)
- Rendezvous with Death (2006)
- Rendezvous with Dishonour (1970)
- Rendezvous in July (1949)
- Rendezvous at Midnight (1935)
- Rendezvous in Paris (1982)
- Rendezvous in Paris (1995)
- Rendezvous in Space (1964)
- Rendition (2007)
- Rendu (2006)
- Rendu Jella Sita (1983)
- Rendu Pondatti Kaavalkaaran (1992)
- Rendu Rella Aaru (1986)
- The Renegade (1951)
- Renegade Force (1998)
- Renegade Girl (1946)
- Renegade Riders (1967)
- Renegade Trail (1939)
- Renegades: (1930, 1946, 1989 & 2017)
- Renegades of the Rio Grande (1945)
- Renegades of Sonora (1948)
- Renegades of the West (1932)
- Renewal (2008)
- Renfield (2023)
- Renfrew of the Royal Mounted (1937)
- Renner (2025)
- Reno: (1923, 1930 & 1939)
- Reno 911!: Miami (2007)
- Reno and the Doc (1984)
- Renoir (2012)
- Rent (2005)
- Rent Control: (1984 & 2005 TV)
- Rent-a-Cat (2012)
- Rent-a-Cop (1987)
- Rent-a-Kid (1995)
- The Rental (2020)
- Rental Family (2025)
- Rented Lips (1988)

==== Rep ====
- Repas de bébé (1895)
- Repast (1951)
- Repatriation (2004)
- Repeat Performance (1947)
- Repeaters (2010)
- Repent at Leisure (1941)
- Repentance: (1922, 1987 & 2013)
- The Replacement Killers (1998)
- The Replacements (2000)
- Replacing Dad (1999 TV)
- Replay (2001)
- Repli-Kate (2002)
- Replicant (2001)
- Replicas (2018)
- Repo Chick (2009)
- Repo Jake (1990)
- Repo Man (1984)
- Repo Men (2010)
- Repo! The Genetic Opera (2008)
- Report (1967)
- The Report: (1977 & 2019)
- Report to the Commissioner (1975)
- Report on Death (1993)
- A Report on the Party and the Guests (1966)
- Reportage 57 (1959)
- Reportaje (1953)
- Reportaje a un cadaver (1955)
- Reported Missing (1937)
- Reporter (2009)
- The Reporter (2015)
- Repossessed (1990)
- Reprisal (2018)
- Reprise (2006)
- The Reptile (1966)
- Reptilian (1999)
- Reptilicant (2006)
- Reptilicus (1961)
- Reptiloid (2013)
- Repulsion (1965)
- Reputation: (1917 & 1921)

==== Req–Res ====
- Requiem: (1982, 1995 & 2006)
- Requiem for Billy the Kid (2006)
- Requiem for Dominic (1991)
- Requiem for a Dream (2000)
- Requiem for a Gringo (1968)
- Requiem for a Gunfighter (1965)
- Requiem for a Handsome Bastard (1992)
- Requiem for a Heavyweight (1962)
- Requiem for Mrs. J (2017)
- Requiem pro panenku (1992)
- Requiem for a Secret Agent (1966)
- Requiem of Snow (2005)
- Requiem pour un Vampire (1971)
- Requiem pro panenku (1992)
- Requirements to Be a Normal Person (2015)
- Rerun (2018)
- Resan (1987)
- Resan bort (1945)
- Resan till dej (1953)
- The Rescue: (1917, 1929, 1988, 2021)
- Rescue Dawn (2007)
- Rescue from Gilligan's Island (1978)
- Rescue Heroes: The Movie (2003)
- Rescue Me (1992)
- The Rescue on the River (1896)
- Rescue Squad (1935)
- Rescued from an Eagle's Nest (1908)
- Rescued by Rover (1905)
- The Rescuers (1977)
- The Rescuers Down Under (1990)
- The Rescuing Angel (1919)
- Reservation Road (2007)
- Reserved for the Death (1963)
- Reservoir Dogs (1992)
- Reset (2017)
- Resham Filili (2015)
- Resham Ki Dori (1974)
- Reshma Aur Shera (1971)
- Reshmi Sari (1940)
- The Resident (2011)
- Resident Alien (1990)
- Resident Evil series:
  - Resident Evil (2002 & 2026)
  - Resident Evil: Apocalypse (2004)
  - Resident Evil: Extinction (2007)
  - Resident Evil: Degeneration (2008)
  - Resident Evil: Afterlife (2010)
  - Resident Evil: Retribution (2012)
  - Resident Evil: Damnation (2012)
  - Resident Evil: The Final Chapter (2016)
  - Resident Evil: Vendetta (2017)
  - Resident Evil: Welcome to Raccoon City (2021)
  - Resident Evil: Death Island (2023)
  - Resident Evil Requiem - Evil Has Always Had a Name (2026)
- The Resistance (2011)
- The Resistance Banker (2018)
- Resolution (2012)
- Respect (2021)
- Respiro (2002)
- The Response (2008)
- Ressha Sentai ToQger vs. Kyoryuger: The Movie (2015)
- The Rest Cure (1923)
- The Rest Is Silence: (1959 & 2007)
- Rest Stop (2006)
- Rest Stop: Don't Look Back (2008)
- The Restless (2006)
- The Restless Breed (1957)
- The Restless Conscience: Resistance to Hitler Within Germany 1933-1945 (1992)
- The Restless and the Damned (1959)
- Restless Natives (1985)
- The Restless Sex (1920)
- The Restless Spirit (1913)
- The Restless Years (1958)
- Restoration (1995)
- The Restoration (1910)
- The Restorers (2003)
- Restraint (2008)
- Restrepo (2010)
- Restricted Call (2021)
- Resurface (2017)
- Resurrected (1989)
- The Resurrected (1991)
- Resurrecting the Champ (2007)
- Resurrection: (1909, 1912, 1918, 1923, 1931, 1944, 1958, 1960, 1980, 1999, 2001, 2016 Argentine, 2016 Mexican & 2022)
- The Resurrection of Broncho Billy (1970)
- The Resurrection of Gavin Stone (2017)
- The Resurrection of the Golden Wolf (1979)
- Resurrection of the Little Match Girl (2002)
- The Resurrection of Zachary Wheeler (1971)

==== Ret ====
- Retablo (2017)
- Retenez Moi...Ou Je Fais Un Malheur (1984)
- El Retorno del Hombre Lobo (1980)
- El Retorno de Walpurgis (1973)
- Retouch (2017)
- Le Retour à la Raison (1923)
- Le Retour d'un aventurier (1966)
- Retrato de Familia (1976)
- Retreat (2011)
- Retribution: (1921, 1987, 2006, 2015 & 2023)
- Retrieval (2006)
- Retroactive (1997)
- Retrograde: (2004 & 2022)
- Return: (1985, 2010 & 2011)
- The Return: (1980, 2003, 2006 & 2013)
- Return to the 36th Chamber (1980)
- Return of the Ape Man (1944)
- Return from the Ashes (1965)
- Return of the Bad Men (1948)
- Return to the Batcave: The Misadventures of Adam and Burt (2003) (TV)
- Return of the Bastards (2003)
- Return of the Beverly Hillbillies (1981) (TV)
- Return of the Blind Dead (1973)
- Return to the Blue Lagoon (1991)
- Return to Boggy Creek (1977)
- Return of the Boogeyman (1994)
- The Return of Captain Invincible (1983)
- The Return of Captain Nemo (1978) (TV)
- The Return of the Cisco Kid (1949)
- The Return of Count Yorga (1971)
- Return of the Cuckoo (1944)
- The Return of Dr. Fu Manchu (1930)
- Return to Eden (1983)
- Return of the Fly (1959)
- The Return of Frank James (1940)
- The Return of the Frog (1938)
- Return to Frogtown (1993)
- Return of the Frontiersman (1950)
- Return to Glennascaul (1951)
- The Return of Godzilla (1984)
- Return of the Gunfighter (1967)
- Return to Halloweentown (2006) (TV)
- Return of the Hero (2018)
- Return to Horror High (1987)
- Return to House on Haunted Hill (2007)
- The Return of Jafar (1994)
- Return of the Jedi (1983)
- Return of the Killer Tomatoes! (1988)
- The Return of the King (1980)
- Return of the Kung Fu Dragon (1976)
- Return of the Lash (1947)
- Return of the Living Dead series:
  - The Return of the Living Dead (1985)
  - Return of the Living Dead Part II (1988)
  - Return of the Living Dead 3 (1993)
  - Return of the Living Dead: Necropolis (2005)
  - Return of the Living Dead: Rave to the Grave (2005)
- Return to the Lost World (1992)
- Return of the Lucky Stars (1989)
- Return of the Magnificent Seven (1966)
- The Return of a Man Called Horse (1976)
- Return of the Man from U.N.C.L.E. (1986) (TV)
- The Return of Martin Guerre (1982)
- Return to Me (2000)
- Return of the Moonwalker (2011)
- The Return of the Musketeers (1989)
- Return to Never Land (2002)
- Return of the One-Armed Swordsman (1969)
- Return to Oz (1985)
- Return to Paradise (1998)
- The Return of the Prodigal Son: (1966 & 1976)
- The Return of the Pink Panther (1975)
- Return of the Rebels (1981) (TV)
- Return of Sabata (1971)
- A Return to Salem's Lot (1987)
- The Return of the Scarlet Pimpernel (1937)
- Return of the Secaucus 7 (1980)
- Return of the Sentimental Swordsman (1981)
- Return of the Seven (1966)
- The Return of the Six Million Dollar Man and the Bionic Woman (1987) (TV)
- Return to Sleepaway Camp (2008)
- Return of the Storks (2007)
- Return of the Street Fighter (1974)
- The Return of Superfly (1990)
- The Return of Swamp Thing (1989)
- Return of the Terror (1934)
- Return of the Texan (1952)
- The Return of the Texas Chainsaw Massacre (1995)
- Return of the Tiger (1978)
- The Return of the Vampire (1943)
- Return from Witch Mountain (1978)
- Returner (2002)

==== Reu–Rey ====
- Reuben, Reuben (1983)
- Reunion: (1932, 1936, 1980 TV, 1989, 2001, 2012 & 2024)
- The Reunion: (1963, 2011 American, 2011 Danish, 2012 & 2013)
- Reunion at Fairborough (1985) (TV)
- Reunion in France (1942)
- Reunion in Reno (1951)
- Reunion in Rhythm (1937)
- Reunion in Vienna (1933)
- Reuniting the Rubins (2010)
- Revak the Rebel (1960)
- Revanche (2008)
- Revathikkoru Pavakkutty (1986)
- Revati (2005)
- Reveille (1924)
- Reveille with Beverly (1943)
- Reveille: The Great Awakening (1925)
- Revelation: (1918, 1924 & 2001)
- Revelations of an Insomniac (1991)
- The Revenant: (2009 & 2015)
- Revenge: (1918, 1928, 1948, 1971, 1978, 1985, 1989, 1990 & 2007)
- The Revenge (2002)
- Revenge of the Bandits (1922)
- Revenge of the Barbarians (1960)
- Revenge of Black Eagle (1951)
- Revenge of the Boarding School Dropouts (2009)
- Revenge of the Bridesmaids (2010) (TV)
- Revenge of a Crazy Girl (1951)
- Revenge of the Creature (1955)
- Revenge for Eddy (1929)
- The Revenge of Frankenstein (1958)
- Revenge of the Green Dragons (2014)
- Revenge for Jolly! (2012)
- Revenge Is Mine (1919)
- Revenge of Itzik Finkelstein (1993)
- Revenge for Love (2017)
- Revenge of the Nerds series:
  - Revenge of the Nerds (1984)
  - Revenge of the Nerds II: Nerds in Paradise (1987)
  - Revenge of the Nerds III: The Next Generation (1992)
  - Revenge of the Nerds IV: Nerds in Love (1994)
- Revenge of the Ninja (1983)
- Revenge of the Pink Panther (1978)
- Revenge Quest (1995)
- Revenge of the Gladiators: La vendetta di Spartacus (1964), La vendetta dei gladiatori (1964)
- The Revenge of the Whore (2012) (TV)
- Revenge: A Love Story (2010)
- Reversal of Fortune: (1990 & 2003)
- The Revisionaries (2012)
- Revolt of the Zombies (1936)
- Revolution: (1933, 1968, 1985 & 2012)
- Revolution OS (2001)
- Revolution of Pigs (2004)
- The Revolution Will Not Be Televised (2002)
- Revolutionary Road (2009)
- Revolver: (1973 & 2005)
- Reward Unlimited (1944)
- Rewind: (2013 TV, 2019 & 2022)
- Rewind This! (2013)
- Rey (2015)
- Reykjavik Whale Watching Massacre (2009)
- The Rezort (2015)

=== Rh ===
- Rhaatee (2015)
- Rhapsody (1954)
- Rhapsody in August (1991)
- A Rhapsody in Black and Blue (1932)
- Rhapsody in Blue (1945)
- Rhapsody of Happiness (1947)
- Rhapsody Rabbit (1946)
- Rhapsody in Rivets (1941)
- Rhapsody of Spring (1998)
- Rheinsberg (1967)
- Rhinegold (1978)
- The Rhineland Girl (1930)
- Rhinestone (1984)
- Rhino Season (2012)
- Rhinoceros (1974)
- Rhinoceros Eyes (2003)
- Rhubarb: (1951 & 1969)
- Rhubarb Rhubarb (1980)
- Rhyme & Reason (1997)
- Rhymes for Young Ghouls (2013)
- Rhythm: (2000 & 2016)
- Rhythm in the Air (1936)
- Rhythm and Blues Revue (1955)
- Rhythm in the Clouds (1937)
- Rhythm of a Crime (1981)
- Rhythm Inn (1951)
- Rhythm Is It! (2004)
- Rhythm of the Islands (1943)
- The Rhythm of My Life: Ismael Sankara (2011)
- Rhythm Parade (1942)
- Rhythm Racketeer (1937)
- Rhythm on the Range (1936)
- Rhythm on the Reservation (1939)
- Rhythm in a Riff (1947)
- Rhythm on the River (1940)
- Rhythm of the Saddle (1938)
- Rhythm, Salt and Pepper (1951)
- The Rhythm Section (2020)
- Rhythm Serenade (1943)
- Rhythm Thief (1994)
- Rhythm of the Wave (1974)
- Rhythm and Weep (1946)

=== Ri ===
==== Rib–Ric ====
- Ribbit (2014)
- Ribbon (2017)
- Ribo ou le soleil sauvage (1978)
- Rice (1957)
- Rice (1963)
- Rice People (1994)
- The Rice People (1957)
- Rice Rhapsody (2004)
- Rich and Famous: (1981 & 1987)
- Rich Girl (1991)
- Rich Girl, Poor Girl (1921)
- Rich Kids (1979)
- Rich in Love (1992)
- Rich Man, Poor Girl (1938)
- Rich Man, Poor Man (1918)
- Rich Man's Folly (1931)
- The Rich Man's Wife (1996)
- Rich Men, Single Women (1990 TV)
- Rich Men's Sons (1927)
- Rich People (1929)
- Rich Relations (1937)
- Rich and Strange (1931)
- Rich, Young and Beautiful (1928)
- Rich, Young and Pretty (1951)
- Richard (1972)
- Richard II (2012 TV)
- Richard III: (1912, 1955, 1995, 2007 & 2016 TV)
- Richard Cardinal: Cry from a Diary of a Métis Child (1986)
- Richard Jewell (2019)
- Richard the Lion-Hearted (1923)
- Richard the Lionheart (2013)
- Richard Pryor: Here and Now (1983)
- Richard Pryor: Live in Concert (1979)
- Richard Pryor: Live on the Sunset Strip (1982)
- Richard the Second (2001)
- Richard the Stork (2017)
- Richard's Things (1980)
- Richard's Wedding (2012)
- Riches, belles, etc. (1998)
- Richest Man in Town (1941)
- Ri¢hie Ri¢h (1994)
- Richie Rich's Christmas Wish (1998)
- Richthofen (1927)
- Ricky: (2009, 2016 & 2025)
- Ricky 1 (1988)
- Ricky 6 (2000)
- Ricky Stanicky (2024)
- Ricochet (1991)
- Ricochet Romance (1954)
- Ricomincio da tre (1981)
- Ricordare Anna (2004)

==== Rid ====
- Riddick (2013)
- Riddler's Moon (1998 TV)
- Riddles of the Sphinx (1977)
- Ride: (1998, 2009, 2012 & 2014)
- Ride 'Em Cowboy: (1936 & 1942)
- Ride Along (2014)
- Ride Along 2 (2016)
- Ride Beyond Vengeance (1966)
- Ride Clear of Diablo (1954)
- Ride a Crooked Mile (1938)
- Ride a Crooked Trail (1958)
- Ride with the Devil (1999)
- Ride or Die: (2003 & 2021)
- Ride to Freedom (1937)
- Ride the High Country (1962)
- Ride the High Iron (1956)
- Ride Him, Bosko! (1932)
- Ride Him, Cowboy (1932)
- Ride the Hot Wind (1971)
- Ride, Kelly, Ride (1941)
- Ride Lonesome (1959)
- Ride the Man Down (1952)
- Ride Me (1994)
- Ride Out for Revenge (1957)
- Ride the Pink Horse (1947)
- Ride Ranger Ride (1936)
- Ride, Rise, Roar (2010)
- Ride, Tenderfoot, Ride (1940)
- Ride the Tiger (1970)
- Ride Tonight! (1942)
- Ride, Vaquero! (1953)
- Ride on Vaquero (1941)
- Ride of the Valkyrie (1967)
- Ride a Violent Mile (1957)
- Ride in the Whirlwind (1965)
- Ride a Wild Pony (1975)
- Ride the Wild Surf (1964)
- Ride for Your Life (1924)
- Rider on a Dead Horse (1962)
- Rider on the Rain (1970)
- Riders (2002)
- Riders of Justice (2020)
- Riders of the Purple Sage: (1918, 1925, 1931, 1941 & 1996 TV)
- Ridicule (1996)
- The Ridiculous 6 (2015)
- Riding Alone for Thousands of Miles (2005)
- Riding the Bullet (2004)
- Riding in Cars with Boys (2001)
- Riding Giants (2004)
- Riding in Vans with Boys (2003)

==== Rie–Rin ====
- Riel (1979)
- Rien que les heures (1926)
- Riff Raff (2024)
- Riff-Raff (1991)
- Riffraff: (1936 & 1947)
- Rififi (1955)
- Rififi in Amsterdam: (1962 & 1966)
- Rififi in Stockholm (1961)
- Rififi in Tokyo (1963)
- Rifkin's Festival (2020)
- Right America: Feeling Wronged – Some Voices from the Campaign Trail (2009)
- Right Bokka Left (2015)
- Right Cross (1950)
- Right Footed (2016)
- The Right Mistake (2015)
- Right Now (2004)
- Right Now, Wrong Then (2015)
- Right Right (2016)
- The Right Stuff (1983)
- The Right Temptation (2001)
- Right There (2013)
- The Right Way: (1921 & 2004)
- Right of Way (1983 TV)
- Right at Your Door (2006)
- The Righteous (2021)
- Righteous Kill (2008)
- Righteous Ties (2006)
- Rihaee (1988)
- Riki-Oh: The Story of Ricky (1991)
- Riley (2023)
- Riley the Cop (1928)
- Riley's First Date? (2015)
- Rim of the Canyon (1949)
- Rim of the World (2019)
- Rime of the Ancient Mariner (1975)
- Rimfire (1949)
- Rimini Rimini (1987)
- Rimini Rimini - Un anno dopo (1988)
- Rimsky-Korsakov (1953)
- Rinaldo Rinaldini (1927)
- Ring (1998)
- The Ring: (1927, 2002, & 2017)
- Ring 0: Birthday (2000)
- Ring 2 (1999)
- Ring of Bright Water (1969)
- Ring of Darkness (2004)
- A Ring of Endless Light (2002 TV)
- Ring Ring (2019)
- Ring of Steel (1942)
- The Ring Two (2005)
- Ring Up the Curtain (1919)
- The Ring Virus (1999)
- The Ringer: (1928, 1931, 1952, 2005 & 2013)
- Ringers: Lord of the Fans (2005)
- Ringmaster (1998)
- Rings: (2005 & 2017)
- The Rink (1916)

==== Rio–Rir ====
- Rio: (1939 & 2011)
- Rio 2 (2014)
- Rio, 100 Degrees F. (1955)
- Rio 2096: A Story of Love and Fury (2013)
- Rio Belongs to Us (2013)
- Rio Bravo (1959)
- Rio Conchos (1964)
- Rio Grande: (1920 & 1950)
- Rio Grande Patrol (1950)
- Rio Grande Raiders (1946)
- Rio, I Love You (2014)
- Rio Lobo (1970)
- Rio das Mortes (1971)
- Rio Rita: (1929 & 1942)
- Rio Sex Comedy (2010)
- Rio turbio (1952)
- Riot: (1969 & 1997)
- The Riot: (1913 & 2021)
- Riot in Cell Block 11 (1954)
- Riot in Juvenile Prison (1959)
- Riot on Redchurch Street (2012)
- Riot Squad: (1933 & 1941)
- Riot on Sunset Strip (1967)
- Rip Girls (2000 TV)
- Rip Roarin' Buckaroo (1936)
- Rip, Sew and Stitch (1953)
- Rip Tide (2017)
- Rip Van Winkle: (1903, 1910, 1912 & 1921)
- Rip's Dream (1905)
- Ripa Hits the Skids (1993)
- Riparo (2007)
- R.I.P.D. (2013)
- Ripe (1996)
- Ripley Under Ground (2005)
- Ripley's Game (2003)
- Ripped Off (1972)
- Ripper (2001)
- Ripper 2: Letter from Within (2004)
- Riprendimi (2008)
- Riptide (1934)
- Riptide a/k/a Ressac (2013)
- Le Rire (1953)

==== Ris ====
- Risas en Vacaciones (1990)
- Rise (2014)
- The Rise (2012)
- Rise: Blood Hunter (2007)
- The Rise of Catherine the Great (1934)
- The Rise and Fall of English Montreal (1993)
- The Rise and Fall of the Great Lakes (1968)
- The Rise and Fall of Legs Diamond (1960)
- The Rise and Fall of Squizzy Taylor (1969)
- The Rise and Fall of a White Collar Hooligan (2012)
- Rise of the Footsoldier (2008)
- Rise of the Gargoyles (2009 TV)
- Rise of the Guardians (2012)
- The Rise of Jennie Cushing (1917)
- The Rise of the Johnsons (1914)
- The Rise of the Krays (2015)
- Rise of the Legend (2014)
- Rise of the Lonestar Ranger (2014)
- Rise of the Planet of the Apes (2011)
- The Rise and Rise of Bitcoin (2014)
- The Rise and Rise of Michael Rimmer (1970)
- Rise and Shine (1941)
- The Rise of Susan (1916)
- Rise of the Teenage Mutant Ninja Turtles: The Movie (2022)
- The Rise of a Tomboy (2016)
- Rise Up (2007)
- Rise of the Zombie (2013)
- Rise of the Zombies (2012 TV)
- Risen: (2010 & 2016)
- Rishi: (2001 & 2005)
- Rishi Moolam (1980)
- Rishta hai pyar ka (1967)
- Rishta Kagaz Ka (1983)
- Rishta To Ho Aisa (1992)
- Rishte Naate (1965)
- Rishtey (2002)
- Rishyasringan (1997)
- Rishyasringar: (1941 & 1964)
- Rising from Ashes (2012)
- Rising to the Bait (1992)
- Rising Damp (1980)
- The Rising Generation (1928)
- The Rising Hawk (2019)
- Rising Moon (2005)
- The Rising of the Moon (1957)
- Rising Stars (2010)
- Rising Sun (1993)
- The Rising Tide (1949)
- Risk: (2001, 2007 & 2016)
- Risky Business: (1920, 1926, 1939 & 1983)
- Risto (2011)

==== Rit–Riz ====
- Rita: (1959, 2009 Indian & 2009 Italian)
- Rita the American Girl (1965)
- Rita of Cascia (1943)
- Rita Dove: An American Poet (2014)
- Rita Hayworth: The Love Goddess (1983 TV)
- Rita the Mosquito (1966)
- Rita, Sue and Bob Too (1987)
- Rita of the West (1967)
- The Rite: (1969 & 2011)
- Rite of Spring (1963)
- Rites of Passage: (1999 & 2012)
- Rites of Spring (2011)
- Rithubhedam (1987)
- Ritmo a todo color (1980)
- Ritmo, amor y juventud (1966)
- Ritmo, amor y picardía (1954)
- Ritmos del Caribe (1950)
- Ritoma (2018)
- Ritratto di borghesia in nero (1978)
- Ritratto di donna velata (1975)
- Ritu: (2009 & 2014)
- Ritual: (2002 & 2013)
- The Ritual: (2009, 2017 & 2025)
- Ritual of Evil (1970 TV)
- Ritual in Transfigured Time (1946)
- Rituals (1977)
- The Ritz (1976)
- Rivales (2008)
- The Rival (1956)
- Rivalry (1953)
- Rivals: (1923, 1925, 1972 & 2008)
- Rivals for the World Record (1930)
- Rive droite, rive gauche (1984)
- River: (2011, 2015 Canadian, 2015 Tibetan & 2021)
- The River: (1938, 1951 & 1984)
- River of Darkness (2011)
- River of Death (1989)
- River of Exploding Durians (2014)
- The River Fuefuki (1960)
- River of Fundament (2014)
- River of Gold: (1971 & 1998)
- River of Grass (1994)
- The River of Love (1960)
- A River Made to Drown In (1997)
- River of Mystery (1971 TV)
- River of No Return (1954)
- River Patrol (1948)
- River Road (2014)
- River of Romance (1929)
- River Runs Red (2018)
- A River Runs Through It (1992)
- River Street (1996)
- The River Wild (1994)
- River Without Buoys (1983)
- River's Edge (1986)
- River's End: (1930 & 1940)
- The River's End (1920)
- Riverbend (1989)
- Riverboat Rhythm (1946)
- Riverburn (2004)
- Riverhead (2016)
- Rivers of Babylon (1998)
- Rivers of Fire and Ice (1969)
- Rivers of Sand (1973)
- Rivers and Tides (2001)
- Riverworld (2003)
- Riyasat (2014)
- Rize (2005)
- R.L. Stine's Pumpkinhead (2025)

=== Ro ===
==== Roa ====
- Road (2002)
- The Road: (1955, 1964, 2001, 2009, 2011 & 2015)
- Road Agent: (1941 & 1952)
- Road to Alcatraz (1945)
- Road to Andalay (1964)
- The Road Back (1937)
- Road to Bali (1952)
- Road to the Big House (1947)
- Road to the Big Leagues (2007)
- Road to Dawn (2007)
- Road Demon (1938)
- The Road to El Dorado (2000)
- Road to Fame (2008)
- Road Games (2015)
- Road Gang (1936)
- The Road to Glory: (1926 & 1936)
- The Road to Guantánamo (2006)
- Road to Happiness (1942)
- Road Hard (2015)
- Road of Hell: (1931, 1946 & 1951)
- Road to Hell (2008)
- The Road Home: (1999 & 2003)
- The Road to Hong Kong (1962)
- Road House: (1928, 1934, 1948, 1989, & 2024)
- Road House 2 (2006)
- Road to Istanbul (2016)
- Road Kill: (1999 & 2010)
- Road to Life: (1931 & 1955)
- The Road to Mandalay: (1926 & 2016)
- Road to Morocco (1942)
- The Road to Mother (2016)
- Road Movie (2002)
- Road to Nhill (1997)
- Road to Ninja: Naruto the Movie (2012)
- Road No. 1 (2010)
- Road North (2012)
- Road to Nowhere (2010)
- Road to Paloma (2014)
- Road to Paradise (1930)
- Road to Paris (2001)
- Road to Perdition (2002)
- Road Rage (1999)
- Road to Redemption (2001 & 2008)
- Road to the Reich (1945)
- Road to Rio: (1931 & 1947)
- Road to Rocío (1966)
- Road Romeo (2007)
- Road to Ruin (1991)
- The Road to Ruin: (1913, 1928 & 1934)
- Road Runner a Go-Go (1965)
- Road to Salina (1970)
- Road to Sangam (2009)
- Road Show (1941)
- Road to Singapore (1940)
- Road to the Stage (1963)
- Road to the Stars (1957)
- Road Trip (2000)
- Road Trip: Beer Pong (2009)
- Road to Utopia (1946)
- Road to Victory: (1941 & 1944)
- The Road to Wellville (1994)
- The Road Within (2014)
- Road to Yesterday (2015)
- Road to Zanzibar (1941)
- Road, Movie (2010)
- Roadblock (1951)
- Roadflower (1994)
- Roadgames (1981)
- Roadhouse 66 (1984)
- Roadhouse Nights (1930)
- Roadie: (1980 & 2011)
- Roadkill: (1989 & 2011)
- Roadracers: (1959 & 1994)
- Roadrunner: A Film About Anthony Bourdain (2021)
- Roads and Bridges (2000)
- Roads of Destiny (1921)
- Roads of Kiarostami (2005)
- Roads to Koktebel (2003)
- Roads to the South (1978)
- Roadside (2013)
- Roadside Ambanis (2011)
- Roadside Prophets (1992)
- Roadside Romeo (2008)
- Roald Dahl's Esio Trot (2015)
- Roam Sweet Home (1996)
- Roamin' Holiday (1937)
- Roamin' Wild (1936)
- Roaming (2013)
- Roaming Lady (1936)
- Roar: (1981 & 2014)
- Roar: Tigers of the Sundarbans (2014)
- Roar of the Crowd (1953)
- Roar of the Dragon (1932)
- Roar of the People (1941)
- Roar of the Press (1941)
- Roarin' Dan (1920)
- Roarin' Guns (1936)
- Roarin' Lead (1936)
- Roaring City (1951)
- Roaring Fire (1981)
- Roaring Lions at Home (1924)
- Roaring Rails (1924)
- Roaring Ranch (1930)
- Roaring Roads (1935)
- Roaring Timber (1937)
- The Roaring Twenties (1939)
- Roaring Wheels (2000)
- Roaring Years (1962)
- Roast Beef and Movies (1934)

==== Rob ====
- Rob the Mob (2014)
- Rob Roy: (1922 & 1995)
- Rob Roy, the Highland Rogue (1953)
- Rob-B-Hood (2006)
- Roba da ricchi (1987)
- The Robber (2010)
- The Robber Bride (1916)
- The Robber Kitten (1935)
- The Robber Symphony (1936)
- The Robbers (1962)
- Robbers of the Range (1941)
- Robbers' Roost: (1932 & 1955)
- Robbery: (1897, 1967 & 1985)
- The Robbery (1953)
- Robbery Alla Turca (2005)
- The Robbery of the Third Reich (2004)
- Robbery Under Arms: (1907 MacMahon, 1907 Tait, 1920, 1957 & 1985)
- Robbie (1979)
- Robbing Cleopatra's Tomb (1899)
- The Robe (1953)
- Robert the Bruce (2019)
- Roberta (1935)
- The Roberts Case (1933)
- Robin and the 7 Hoods (1964)
- Robin Hood: (1912, 1922, 1973, 1991, 2009, 2010 & 2018)
- Robin Hood Daffy (1958)
- Robin Hood: Men in Tights (1993)
- Robin Hood: Prince of Thieves (1991)
- Robin of Locksley (1996) (TV)
- Robin and Marian (1976)
- Robin's Wish (2020)
- Robinson Crusoe: (1902, 1927, 1947, 1954, 1974 TV, 1997 & 2016)
- Robinson Crusoe on Mars (1964)
- RoboCop series:
  - RoboCop: (1987 & 2014)
  - RoboCop 2 (1990)
  - RoboCop 3 (1993)
- Robot (2010)
- Robot & Frank (2012)
- Robot Carnival (1987)
- Robot Dreams (2023)
- Robot in the Family (1994)
- Robot Overlords (2014)
- Robot Stories (2003)
- The Robot vs. The Aztec Mummy (1958)
- Robots: (1988 & 2005)
- A Robust Romeo (1914)

==== Roc ====
- Rocco (2015)
- Rocco and His Brothers (1960)
- The Rochdale Pioneers (2012)
- The Rock (1996)
- Rock of Ages: (1918 & 2012)
- Rock All Night (1957)
- Rock Dog (2017)
- Rock the Kasbah (2015)
- Ro(c)k podvraťáků (2006)
- The Rock n' Roll Cops (2003)
- The Rock 'n' Roll Dreams of Duncan Christopher (2010)
- Rock 'n' Roll High School (1979)
- The Rock of Souls (1942)
- Rock Star: (2001, 2011 & 2015)
- The Rock Star and the Mullahs (2003)
- Rock-A-Bye Baby (1958)
- Rock-a-Doodle (1991)
- The Rocker (2008)
- The Rocket: (2005 & 2013)
- The Rocket from Calabuch (1956)
- The Rocket Man (1954)
- RocketMan (1997)
- Rocketman (2019)
- The Rocket Post (2004)
- Rocket Science (2007)
- The Rocketeer (1991)
- Rocketship X-M (1950)
- Rockin' in the Rockies (1945)
- The Rocking Horse Winner (1949)
- RocknRolla (2008)
- Rocko's Modern Life: Static Cling (2019)
- The Rocks of Valpre: (1919 & 1935)
- Rockula (1990)
- Rocky series:
  - Rocky (1976)
  - Rocky II (1979)
  - Rocky III (1982)
  - Rocky IV (1985)
  - Rocky V (1990)
  - Rocky Balboa (2006)
- The Rocky Horror Picture Show (1975)
- The Rocky Horror Picture Show: Let's Do the Time Warp Again (2016)
- Rocky Mountain Express (2011)
- The Rocky Road (1910)
- Roco Kingdom series:
  - Roco Kingdom: The Desire of Dragon (2013)
  - Roco Kingdom 3 (2014)
  - Roco Kingdom 4 (2015)

==== Rod–Roi ====
- Rodan (1956)
- Rodeo (1952)
- Rodeo Dough (1931)
- A Rodeo Film (2019)
- Rodeo Girl (2016)
- Rodeo King and the Senorita (1951)
- Rodeo Rhythm (1942)
- Rodin (2017)
- Rodinné trampoty oficiála Tříšky (1949)
- Rodor Sithi (2014)
- Rodora (1956)
- Roe v. Wade (2020)
- Roe vs. Wade (1989)
- Roesia si Pengkor (1939)
- Roger Corman's Operation Rogue (2014)
- Roger Dodger (2002)
- Roger la Honte: (1913, 1922, 1933 & 1946)
- Roger & Me (1989)
- Rogers Park (2017)
- Rogue: (2007 & 2017)
- The Rogue (1918)
- Rogue Agent (2022)
- Rogue Cop (1954)
- Rogue Male (1976 TV)
- Rogue One (2016)
- Rogue of the Range (1936)
- Rogue of the Rio Grande (1930)
- The Rogue Song (1930)
- Rogue Trader (1999)
- Rogue's Gallery (1968)
- Rogue's March (1953)
- The Rogues (1987)
- Rogues and Romance (1920)
- Rogues of Sherwood Forest (1950)
- Rogues of the Turf (1923)
- Rogues' Gallery (1944)
- Rogues' Regiment (1948)
- Roh (2019)
- Rohini (1953)
- Le Roi des Champs-Élysées (1934)
- Le Roi danse (2000)
- Le Roi Pandore (1950)
- Le Roi des resquilleurs (1930)

==== Roj–Rol ====
- Roja (1992)
- Roja Kootam (2002)
- Roja Malare (1997)
- Rojavai Killathe (1993)
- Rojavanam (1999)
- Rojavin Raja (1976)
- Rojo Amanecer (1990)
- Rojulu Marayi (1955)
- Rok 1863 (1922)
- Rok pierwszy (1960)
- Rok Sako To Rok Lo (2004)
- Rok spokojnego slonca (1984)
- Rokk í Reykjavík (1982)
- Rokkasho Rhapsody (2006)
- Rokunin no Ansatsusha (1955)
- Roland the Mighty (1956)
- The Role of Her Life (2004)
- Role Models: (2008 & 2017)
- Roll Along, Cowboy (1937)
- Roll Bounce (2005)
- Roll on Columbia: Woody Guthrie and the Columbia River Songs (2011)
- Roll, Freddy, Roll! (1974 TV)
- Roll Red Roll (2018)
- Roll Up Your Sleeves (2008)
- The Roller Blade Seven (1991)
- Roller Boogie (1979)
- Roller Derby Girl (1949)
- Roller Life (2016)
- Rollerball: (1975 & 2002)
- Rollercoaster: (1977 & 1999)
- Rolli: Amazing Tales (1991)
- Rollin' Home to Texas (1940)
- Rollin' with the Nines (2006)
- Rollin' Plains (1938)
- Rolling (2007)
- Rolling Caravans (1938)
- Rolling Down the Great Divide (1942)
- Rolling Home: (1926, 1935 & 1946)
- Rolling Kansas (2003)
- Rolling Loud: The Movie (2026)
- Rolling Love (2008)
- Rolling Man (1972 TV)
- Rolling Papers (2015)
- Rolling Stones (1916)
- The Rolling Stones Rock and Roll Circus (1996)
- Rolling Thunder (1977)
- Rolling Thunder Revue: A Bob Dylan Story by Martin Scorsese (2019)
- Rollo and the Spirit of the Woods (2001)
- Rollover (1981)
- Rolls – 28 (1951)

==== Rom ====
- Roma: (1972, 2004 & 2018)
- Roma come Chicago (1968)
- Roma, l'altra faccia della violenza (1976)
- Roma Elastica (2026)
- Roman (2006)
- Roman Candles: (1920 & 1966)
- Roman Holiday: (1953, 1987 TV & 2017)
- Roman Polanski: A Film Memoir (2018)
- Roman Polanski: Wanted and Desired (2008)
- Roman Scandals (1933)
- The Roman Spring of Mrs. Stone (1961)
- Roman Tales (1955)
- Romance: (1920, 1930, 1936, 1983, 1986, 1999 & 2013)
- Romance and Arabella (1919)
- Romance of Astree and Celadon (2007)
- Romance for Bugle (1967)
- Romance of Celluloid (1937)
- Romance & Cigarettes (2006)
- Romance Complicated (2016)
- Romance in the Dark (1938)
- Romance de fieras (1954)
- Romance Joe (2011)
- Romance Land (1923)
- Romance in Manhattan (1935)
- Romance in Mekong River (1933)
- Romance in a Minor Key (1943)
- Romance Out of the Blue (2015)
- Romance in Puerto Rico (1962)
- Romance in the Rain (1934)
- Romance Ranch (1924)
- Romance in Rhythm (1934)
- A Romance of Seville (1929)
- Romance in Venice (1962)
- Romance of the Western Chamber (1927)
- Romancing the Stone (1984)
- The Romantic Englishwoman (1975)
- The Romantic President (2002)
- The Romantics (2010)
- Romanzo criminale (2005)
- Rome, Open City (1945)
- Romeo Is Bleeding (1993)
- Romeo and Juliet: (1900, 1908, 1916 Fox, 1916 Metro Pictures, 1936, 1940, 1953, 1954, 1955, 1968, 1996, 2006, 2013 & 2014)
- Romeo and Juliet in Sarajevo (1994)
- Romeo & Juliet: Sealed with a Kiss (2006)
- Romeo.Juliet (1990)
- Romeo Juliet (2015 & 2017)
- Romeo Must Die (2000)
- Romper Stomper (1992)
- Rómulo Resiste (2021)
- Romy and Michele's High School Reunion (1997)

==== Ron–Ror ====
- Ron's Gone Wrong (2021)
- Ronaldo (2015)
- Ronan's Escape (2010)
- La Ronde: (1950 & 1964)
- Rondo (1966)
- Ronia, the Robber's Daughter (1984)
- Ronin (1999)
- Rooftops (1989)
- Roohi: (1981 & 2021)
- The Rookie: (1959, 1990 & 2002)
- Rookie of the Year (1993)
- Rookies (1927)
- The Rookies (2019)
- Rookies in Burma (1943)
- Rookies on Parade (1941)
- Room: (2005 & 2015)
- The Room: (2003 & 2019)
- Room 6 (2006)
- Room 8 (2013)
- Room 10 (2006)
- Room 237 (2012)
- Room 304 (2011)
- Room 666 (1982)
- Room No. 103 (2015)
- Room No.7 (2017)
- Room and Bird (1951)
- Room and Board (1921)
- Room and a Half (2009)
- Room for Rent (2017)
- Room for Rent (2019)
- Room in Rome (2010)
- A Room for Romeo Brass (1999)
- Room at the Top: (1959 & 2012)
- A Room with a View: (1986 & 2007)
- Room: The Mystery (2014)
- The Roommate (2011)
- The Roost (2006)
- Rooster Cogburn (1975)
- The Root of Evil (1912)
- The Roots of Heaven (1958)
- Roots Search (1986)
- Rope (1948)
- Rory o' the Bogs (1913)
- Rory O'More (1911)

==== Ros–Rot ====
- Rosa (1986)
- Rosa de América (1946)
- Rosa and Cornelia (2000)
- Rosa de las nieves (1944)
- Rosa Luxemburg (1986)
- Rosa Morena (2010)
- Rosalba, la fanciulla di Pompei (1952)
- Rosalie (1937)
- Rosalinda (1945)
- Rosaline (2022)
- Rosapoo (2018)
- Rosappu Ravikkaikari (1979)
- Rosario: (1935, 2010 & 2025)
- Rosario Tijeras (2005)
- Rosaura at 10 O'Clock (1958)
- Rose: (2011, 2012 & 2014)
- The Rose (1979)
- Rose of the Alley (1916)
- Rose by Any Other Name... (1997)
- Rose of the Asphalt Streets (1922)
- Rose Bernd: (1919 & 1957)
- Rose Bowl (1936)
- Rose of Cimarron (1952)
- Rose of the Golden West (1927)
- Rose Hobart (1936)
- Rose Hill (1997 TV)
- Rose Kennedy: A Life to Remember (1990)
- The Rose Maker (2020)
- Rose Marie: (1936 & 1954)
- Rose-Marie (1928)
- Rose of the Mountain (1952)
- Rose o' Paradise (1918)
- Rose Plays Julie (2019)
- Rose of the Rancho: (1914 & 1936)
- Rose of the Rio Grande (1938)
- Rose o' the River (1919)
- Rose o' the Sea (1922)
- Rose Rose I Love You (1993)
- The Rose Tattoo (1955)
- Rose of the Tenements (1926)
- Rose of Tralee: (1937 & 1942)
- Rose of Washington Square (1939)
- Rose of the Wilderness (1918)
- Rose of the World: (1918 & 1925)
- Rose of the Yukon (1949)
- Roseanna: (1967 & 1993)
- Rosebud: (1975 & 2019)
- Roseland (1977)
- Roselyne and the Lions (1989)
- Rosemary (1958)
- Rosemary Climbs the Heights (1918)
- Rosemary, That's for Remembrance (1914)
- Rosemary's Baby (1968)
- Rosemary's Daughter (1976)
- Rosemead (2025)
- Rosencrantz & Guildenstern Are Dead (1990)
- Rosenmontag (1924)
- Rosenstrasse (2003)
- Rosenwald (2015)
- Roses à crédit (2010)
- The Roses (2025)
- Roses Are Red (1947)
- Roses Bloom on the Moorland: (1929 & 1952)
- Roses Bloom Twice (1978 TV)
- Roses of Picardy (1927)
- Roses for the Prosecutor (1959)
- Roses from the South: (1926 & 1954)
- Roses in Tyrol (1940)
- Rosetta (1999)
- Rosewater (2014)
- Rosewood (1997)
- Rosewood Lane (2011)
- Rosie: (1965, 1998, 2013 & 2018)
- Rosie! (1967)
- Rosie Dixon – Night Nurse (1978)
- Rosie the Riveter (1944)
- Rosies of the North (1999)
- Rosita (1923)
- Rosogolla (2018)
- Rosolino Paternò, soldato... (1970)
- Rossana (1953)
- Rossini (1942)
- Rossini! Rossini! (1991)
- Rossini's Ghost (1996)
- Roswell (1994 TV)
- Roswell: The Aliens Attack (1999 TV)
- Rosy (2018)
- Rosy Dreams (1977)
- Rotation (1949)
- Roti: (1942, 1974 & 1988)
- Roti Kapda Aur Makaan (1974)
- Roti Ki Keemat (1990)
- Rotkäppchen (1962)
- Rötmånad (1970)
- Rotten to the Core (1965)
- Rottentail (2019)
- Rottweiler (2005)

==== Rou ====
- Rouge (1988)
- Rouge and Riches (1920)
- Rough (2014)
- Rough Aunties (2008)
- Rough But Respectable (1949)
- Rough Cut: (1980 & 2008)
- Rough Diamonds (1994)
- Rough Going (1925)
- The Rough House (1917)
- Rough House Rosie (1927)
- Rough Justice (1970)
- Rough Magic (1995)
- Rough Night (2017)
- Rough Night in Jericho (1967)
- Rough Play (2013)
- Rough and Ready (1918)
- Rough Rider (2014)
- Rough Riders (1997)
- Rough Riders of Cheyenne (1945)
- Rough Riders of Durango (1951)
- Rough Riding Ranger (1935)
- Rough Riding Romance (1919)
- Rough Romance (1930)
- Rough Sea at Dover (1895)
- Rough Shoot (1953)
- Rough Stuff (1925)
- Rough, Tough and Ready (1945)
- Rough Waters (1930)
- Roughly Speaking (1945)
- Roughshod: (1922 & 1949)
- Roujin Z (1991)
- Roulette: (1924 & 2011)
- Round the Decay (2025)
- Round Eyes in the Middle Kingdom (1995)
- Round Midnight (1986)
- Round Trip to Mars (1957)
- The Round Up: (1941 & 2010)
- The Round-Up: (1920 & 1966)
- Round-Up Time in Texas (1937)
- Rounders (1998)
- The Rounders: (1914 & 1965)
- Roundhay Garden Scene (1888)
- Rounding Up the Law (1922)
- Roundtrip (2004)
- The Roundup (2022)
- Roustabout (1964)

==== Rov–Roz ====
- The Rover: (1967 & 2014)
- Rover Dangerfield: The Dog Who Gets No Respect (1991)
- Rover's Big Chance (1942)
- Rovin' Tumbleweeds (1939)
- Roving Mars (2006)
- Row Your Boat (1998)
- Rowdy: (1966 & 2014)
- Rowdy Aliya (2004)
- Rowdy Alludu (1991)
- Rowdy Fellow (2014)
- Rowdy Gaari Pellam (1991)
- Rowdy Inspector (1992)
- Rowdy & MLA (1991)
- Rowdy Ramu (1978)
- Rowdy Ramudu Konte Krishnudu (1980)
- Rowdy Ranganna (1968)
- Rowdy Rathore (2012)
- The Rowdyman (1972)
- Rowing Across the Atlantic (1978)
- Rowing with the Wind (1988)
- Roxanne (1987)
- Roxanne Roxanne (2018)
- Roxie Hart (1942)
- Roxy Hunter series:
  - Roxy Hunter and the Mystery of the Moody Ghost (2007)
  - Roxy Hunter and the Secret of the Shaman (2008)
  - Roxy Hunter and the Myth of the Mermaid (2008)
  - Roxy Hunter and the Horrific Halloween (2008)
- Roxy and the Wonderteam (1938)
- Roy: (2015 & 2021)
- Roy Colt & Winchester Jack (1970)
- A Royal Affair (2012)
- Royal Bengal Rahashya (2011)
- Royal Blood (1916)
- Royal Cat Nap (1958)
- Royal Cavalcade (1935)
- Royal Children (1950)
- Royal Eagle (1936)
- Royal Family (1969 TV)
- The Royal Family of Broadway (1930)
- Royal Flash (1975)
- Royal Hearts (2018)
- Royal Journey (1951)
- Royal Kill (2009)
- Royal Paintbox (2013)
- Royal River (1959)
- A Royal Romance: (1917 & 1930)
- A Royal Scandal: (1945 & 1996)
- The Royal Scandal (2001)
- Royal Space Force: The Wings of Honnêamise (1987)
- The Royal Tenenbaums (2001)
- Royal Tramp (1992)
- Royal Tramp II (1992)
- Royal Treasure (2016)
- Royal Waltz (1936)
- Royal Wedding (1951)
- Royce (1994)
- Rozina, the Love Child (1945)

=== Rr–Rz ===
- RRR (2022)
- Ruang Talok 69 (1999)
- Rubber: (1936 & 2010)
- Rubber's Lover (1996)
- Ruby in Paradise (1993)
- Ruby Sparks (2012)
- Rudo y Cursi (2009)
- Rudolf the Black Cat (2016)
- Rudolph the Red-Nosed Reindeer: (1948 & 1964 TV)
- Rudolph the Red-Nosed Reindeer and the Island of Misfit Toys (2001)
- Rudolph the Red-Nosed Reindeer: The Movie (1998)
- Rudy (1993)
- Rudyard Kipling's Jungle Book (1942)
- Ruggles of Red Gap (1935)
- The Rugrats series:
  - The Rugrats Movie (1998)
  - Rugrats in Paris: The Movie (2000)
  - Rugrats Go Wild (2003)
- The Ruins (2008)
- Rule Breakers (2025)
- Rules Don't Apply (2017)
- The Rules of Attraction (2002)
- Rules of Dating (2005)
- Rules of Engagement (2000)
- The Rules of the Game (1939)
- The Ruling Class (1972)
- The Rum Diary (2011)
- Rumble: (2002, 2016 & 2021)
- Rumble in the Bronx (1996)
- Rumble Fish (1983)
- Rumor Has It (2005)
- Rumpelstiltskin: (1940, 1955, 1985 TV, 1987 & 1995)
- Run: (1991, 2002, 2004, 2014, 2016, 2019, 2020 American, 2020 Indian & 2025)
- Run Boy Run (2013)
- Run Fatboy Run (2007)
- Run Hide Fight (2020)
- Run Hide Fight: Infidels (2026)
- Run Lola Run (1998)
- Run Rabbit Run (2023)
- Run Raja Run (2008)
- Run Ronnie Run (2003)
- Run Silent, Run Deep (1958)
- Run Sweetheart Run (2020)
- Run This Town (2019)
- Run, Man, Run (1968)
- Runaway: (1964, 1984, 2001, 2005, 2009 short, & 2010)
- Runaway Bride (1999)
- Runaway Jury (2003)
- Runaway Train (1985)
- Runaway! (1973) (TV)
- The Runaway: (1926, 1966 & 2004)
- The Runaway Bride (1930)
- The Runaways: (1975 TV, 2010 & 2018)
- The Rundown (2003)
- The Runner: (1985, 1999 & 2015)
- Runner Runner (2013)
- The Runner Stumbles (1979)
- Running the Bases (2022)
- Running on Empty: (1982, 1988 & 2006)
- The Running Jumping & Standing Still Film (1960)
- Running on Karma (2003)
- The Running Man: (1963, 1987 & 2025)
- Running Man: (2013 & 2015)
- Running Out of Time: (1994 & 1999)
- Running Scared: (1972, 1980, 1986, & 2006)
- Running with Scissors (2006)
- Running Time (1997)
- Running Wild: (1992 & 2006)
- Runt (2020)
- Runt (2024)
- Rurouni Kenshin series:
  - Rurouni Kenshin (2012)
  - Rurouni Kenshin: The Beginning (2021)
  - Rurouni Kenshin: The Final (2021)
  - Rurouni Kenshin: Kyoto Inferno (2014)
  - Rurouni Kenshin: The Legend Ends (2014)
- Rush: (1991 & 2013)
- Rush Hour series:
  - Rush Hour (1998)
  - Rush Hour 2 (2001)
  - Rush Hour 3 (2007)
- Rush in Rio (2003)
- Rush Week (1989)
- Rushmore (1998)
- Ruslan and Ludmila (1972)
- Russian Ark (2002)
- Russian Dolls (2005)
- The Russian House (1990)
- The Russians Are Coming, the Russians Are Coming (1966)
- Rust: (2010, 2018 & 2024)
- Rust and Bone (2012)
- Rustlers: (1919 & 1949)
- Rustlers of Devil's Canyon (1947)
- Rustlers of Red Dog (1935)
- Rustlers' Hideout (1944)
- Rustlers' Rhapsody (1985)
- Rustlers' Roundup (1933)
- Ruthless (1948)
- The Ruthless (2019)
- Ruthless People (1986)
- Rx (2005)
- Rx Murder (1958)
- RX 100 (2018)
- Ryan (2004)
- The Ryan White Story (1989) (TV)
- Ryan's Daughter (1970)
- Ryan's World the Movie: Titan Universe Adventure (2024)
- Ryba na suchu (1942)
- Ryujin Mabuyer the Movie: Nanatsu no Mabui (2012)
- Ryuzo and The Seven Henchmen (2015)
- Rzeczywistość (1961)

Previous: List of films: P Next: List of films: S

== See also ==
- Lists of films
- Lists of actors
- List of film and television directors
- List of documentary films
- List of film production companies
