= Quality Time =

Quality time refers informally to periods proactively spent with one's loved ones.

Quality Time may refer to:

- Quality Time (album), a 1995 album by Whitehouse
- Quality Time (2017 film), a Dutch drama film
- My Apocalypse (film), originally titled Quality Time, a 2008 independent film
- "Quality Time" (Drop the Dead Donkey), a 1994 television episode
- Quality Time, a 2019 album by Jim Gaffigan
