= Red State =

Red State may refer to:

- a state in the United States with a tendency to elect Republicans, following the labeling convention of red states and blue states
- Red State (2006 film), a documentary film by Michael Shea
- Red State (2011 film), a film by Kevin Smith

== See also ==
- RedState, an American political weblog aimed at American Republicans and other conservatives
- Red flag (politics), an association of communism, socialism, or labor movements with the color red
