= Rerun (disambiguation) =

A rerun (or, sometimes, repeat) is a re-airing of an episode of a television program.

Rerun may also refer to:

== Fictional characters ==
- Rerun, a once-lived villain on the TV series Static Shock
- Freddie "Rerun" Stubbs, a character in the American TV series What's Happening!!, portrayed by Fred Berry
- Rerun van Pelt, a character in the Peanuts comic strip

== Music ==
- "Re Run", a song by Man Overboard from the 2013 album Heart Attack
- "Rerun", a 2022 song by Mia Wray
- "Rerun", a song by Quavo from his 2018 album Quavo Huncho

== Other uses ==
- Rerun (film), a 2018 film
- Night of the Living Rerun, an original novel based on the Buffy the Vampire Slayer television series
- The Rerun Show, a short-lived sketch comedy that aired on NBC in 2002
