= Rebel Scum =

- Thumbnail of the fan film
- Directed by: Timothy Van Nguyen
- Screenplay by: Paul Van Nguyen
- Based on: Star Wars by George Lucas
- Produced by: Timothy Van Nguyen; Paul Van Nguyen; Daniel Van Nguyen; Josiah Swaim (associate producer)
- Starring: Andrae Braun; Anastasia Moody; Hanna Soltek; Samantha Roberts
- Cinematography: Timothy Van Nguyen
- Edited by: Timothy Van Nguyen
- Production company: Blood Brother Cinema Company
- Release date: January 9, 2016 (YouTube)
- Running time: 9 minutes
- Country: Canada
- Language: English

Rebel Scum is a Star Wars fan film directed by Timothy Van Nguyen. On January 9, 2016, the film was released to YouTube. It takes place shortly after the Rebels retreat from Echo Base on the planet Hoth during the beginning of The Empire Strikes Back. As of February 2023, it has been viewed over 2.3 million times.

== Cast ==
- Andrae Braun as Rebel Pilot
- Anastasia Moody as Imperial Snowtrooper
- Hanna Soltek as Pilot's Wife
- Samantha Roberts as Pilot's Daughter

== Production ==
Around January 2015 to around March 2015, filming took place in Alberta, Canada. A snow camera was used during filming.

Instead of using CGI, stop motion animation and practical effects were used, due to the budget, and to make something that felt "real and lifelike". To film the animation, they used an illuminated box with still pictures of the scenes.

== Release ==
The film was officially selected at the 2016 Tri-Cities International Film Festival, MidAmeriCon II, the 2016 Lost Episode Festival Toronto, and the 2017 WorldFest-Houston International Film Festival.

== Reception ==
Richard Lawson of Vanity Fair praised the visual effects, described the film as, "well-produced," and said, "It’s a good, humbly done micro movie. I like it." Nick Statt of The Verge praised the costume work, how the environment was used, and the visual effects. Jeff Spry of Syfy Wire ranked the film number seven on his top fourteen best Star Wars fan films list. He described it as "excellent," and "impressive." Brock Wilbur of Inverse described himself as "blown away" after viewing the film. Holly Williams of ContactMusic.com called the film, "[The] Best Star Wars tribute ever...," and praised the filmmakers' efforts and production quality. Julien Cadot of Numerama called it (translated into English), "9 minutes you will not regret!," and praised the story. Jeremy Fuster of TheWrap ranked the film number two on his top eleven best Star Wars fan films list. Chloe Cole of Dorkly described the film as something that could have been in the Original Trilogy of Star Wars. Steve Fitch of Star Wars Reporter called the film, "engaging," and, "brilliant."

=== Accolades ===
Ceremony	Award	Date of ceremony	Result	Ref(s)
2017 WorldFest-Houston International Film Festival	Platinum Remi Award	April 20–30, 2017	Won	
