= The Reformation of the Suffragettes =

Silent comedy film

- Production company: Gaumont
- Release date: 1911
- Running time: 203 m
- Country: France

The Reformation of the Suffragettes is a 1911 French silent short comedy film produced by Gaumont.

== Plot ==
Fed up with their husbands' penchant for fishing, the women of a village expel them and attempt to live on their own. But they find this impossible to do, and in the end, welcome their husbands back.
