= Return of the Moonwalker =

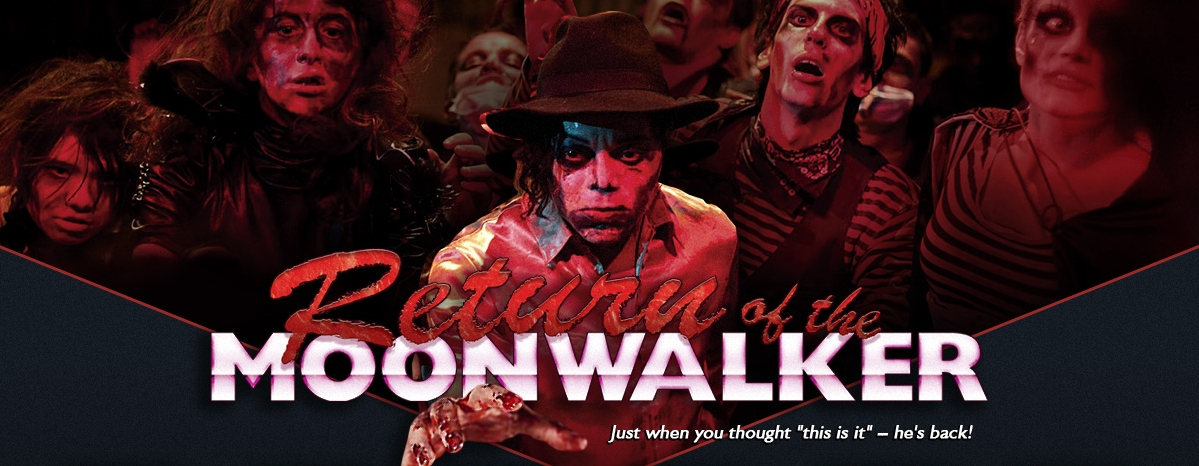
- Return of the Moonwalker promo still
- Directed by: Mike Maria
- Written by: Mike Maria; Mike Moreau
- Produced by: Mike Maria; Mike Moreau
- Starring: Michael Rider; Mike Maria; Nick Andrews; Nouk Baudrot; Claudine Biswas; Peter Brownbill; Kamil Buzgan
- Cinematography: Xiaosu Han; Andreas Thalhammer
- Edited by: Firas Sabbagh (film editor)
- Music by: Florian Erlbeck
- Production company: DeRam Film
- Distributed by: CMV Laservision; Indie Rights
- Release date: February 11, 2011
- Running time: 89 minutes
- Country: Germany
- Language: English

Return of the Moonwalker is a 2011 feature-length comedy which parodies Michael Jackson with specific references to Michael Jackson's Thriller and other Michael Jackson music videos. It was directed by Mike Maria, who also co-wrote the screenplay with Mike Moreau.

== Plot ==
Count Cagliostro has sent his agents Gog and Magog to retrieve the gloved hand of Michael Jackson (promising them gay marriage and eternal life in return). His plan is to resurrect the deceased pop star to lead a revolution which he feels will bring about peace on Earth. His wife Sarafina is opposed to this plan and feels that the two immortals should instead be focused on keeping a low profile and maintaining their own immortality. Despite her wishes Count Cagliostro manages to complete his ritual in preparation for a special performance at the punk circus that he has been using as a front for his sorcery.

Lesbian ghost hunters Raquel and Monique enter an underground chamber whose owner purports to have belonged to Adolf Hitler and claims is still inhabited by the former Nazi leader's ghost. After fleeing an attempted assault from this man the two girls manage to exit the labyrinth and happen upon the circus of Count Cagliostro.

Nico, T-Bag, and Obama are three young guys out getting drunk and causing trouble on the streets of Berlin when they get lured into a sex dungeon by Sarafina and her dominatrix friends. After torturing the guys and extracting their semen for her husband's elixir of eternal life, she gives them free passes to Cagliostro's circus where they are joined by Raquel and Monique.

During the performance the audience is stunned into silence upon first hearing the voice and then seeing the risen Michael Jackson in the flesh. He extends his hand to Raquel, but upon removing his glove she sees his exposed, decaying flesh. Cagliostro immediately calls a stop to the performance and the ghost hunters and the guys hatch a plan to rescue Jackson from the sorcerer.

While escaping and being chased by skinheads, Muslim extremists, and neo-Nazis, Jackson unites them all into a rainbow army which Cagliostro and Sarafina accidentally transform into an army of the undead, leaving only Raquel and Sarafina to stop them.

== Cast ==
- Michael Rider as Michael Jackson
- Mike Maria as Cagliostro
- Claudine Biswas as Sarafina
- Ana Mena as Raquel
- Sunny Myller as Monique
- Louis DeVaughn Nelson as Obama
- Nick Andrews as T-Bag
- Nouk Baudrot as Nico

== Production ==
=== Development ===
The character of Count Cagliostro was inspired by the 18th century occultist Alessandro Cagliostro. According to Director Mike Maria: "We wanted to do a satire, a crazy comedy about Cagliostro living again in Berlin, and he resurrects Michael Jackson because he's the only force who unite the masses, the left and the right."

=== Filming ===
The film was directed by independent film director Mike Maria (who also played the role of Count Cagliostro) based on an original screenplay by Mike Maria and Mike Moreau (who also co-produced the movie). Chief photography was handled by the team of Andreas Thalhammer and Xiaosu Han who also worked on Lost Place 3D, Asternauts, and the Chinese film Runaway Woman.
