= Revenge Quest =

- original cover art
- Directed by: Alan DeHerrera
- Written by: Alan DeHerrera
- Produced by: Jerry Phiffer
- Starring: Brian Gluhak; Christopher Michael Egger; Jennifer Aguilar
- Cinematography: Alan DeHerrera
- Edited by: Alan DeHerrera
- Music by: Joseph Andolino
- Distributed by: Vista Street Entertainment
- Release date: 1995
- Running time: 72 minutes
- Language: English

Revenge Quest, also known as Amtrak From Mars, is a 1995 direct-to-video action/science fiction thriller directed by Alan DeHerrera, starring Brian Gluhak, Christopher Michael Egger, and Jennifer Aguilar. The story takes place in 2031 Los Angeles, following the escape of a dangerous inmate from the fictitious Red Rock Prison on Mars. The film was released by Vista Street Entertainment.

== Plot ==
Prison fugitive Trent McKormick exits an Amtrak from Mars, having escaped from Red Rock Prison. He is searching for Julie Meyers, the office woman who testified against him. Elsewhere, Detective Rick Castle is summoned by his boss and learns about Trent's escape. He is assigned to protect Julie Meyers and bring in Trent alive. At the same time, a police officer enters Julie Meyers' apartment to secure the witness. Trent McKormick comes out of the shadows and kills the officer before figuring out where Julie works.

McKormick walks into Julie's office and stabs her sexually-harassing boss in the throat with a large knife. Rick finds the dead cop in Julie's apartment and races to her office complex. On his way to rescue her, Rick is attacked by a recently released ex-con. Rick is apparently responsible for the attacker's prison time. Rick knocks him out, dumps him in a garbage truck, and races to Julie's office.

In a stairwell shootout, Rick protects Julie from Trent. He takes her to the safe house, and the two come close to having an intimate moment. While taking a bath, Julie flashes back to the day that Trent vowed revenge. Meanwhile, Trent follows a police officer and kills him after giving him information on Rick's location. Rick takes to the streets in his Dodge Viper to search for McKormick. Rick meets an old friend from the police force at a cafe to see if he has any information. After leaving the bar, Trent brutally murders Rick's friend at a local playhouse. Trent ambushes Rick, and the two of them fight at an old junkyard during a rainstorm. Trent taunts Rick during the fight and misses several opportunities to kill him. Julie emerges from the shadows and shoots Trent. She and Rick embrace and walk off.

== Cast ==
- Brian Gluhak as Rick Castle
- Christopher Michael Egger as Trent McKormick
- Jennifer Aguilar as Julie Meyers

== DVD release ==
Revenge Quest was officially released on DVD in the late 1990s on the "Kill or Be Killed 4 Movie Pack" and the "Action Arsenal 10 Movie Pack". It is available on Amazon Prime with improved video and audio.

== Other formats ==
Revenge Quest was released on VHS in 1995.
