= Reformation (film) =

2015 American short film

- Official Release Poster
- Directed by: Hoyon Jung
- Written by: Hoyon Jung
- Produced by: Joshua Fulton
- Starring: Ty Trumbo, Ida Nilsen, Kevin Keller, VaLynn Rain
- Music by: Sydney Poma, Fabio Keiner
- Release date: April 11, 2015
- Running time: 15 minutes
- Country: United States
- Language: English

Reformation is a 2015 melodramatic neo-noir short film. The film was directed by Hoyon Jung, and stars Ty Trumbo, Ida Nilsen, Kevin Keller and VaLynn Rain.

It held its world premiere on 11 April 2015 at the Tiburon International Film Festival. It has been accepted in various film festivals, including Wizard World Comic Con's Con Film Festival: Philadelphia and Sacramento and San Francisco Frozen Film Festival. The film was released online on January 10, 2015.

== Cast ==
- Ty Trumbo as Bryan
- Ida Nilsen as Rachel
- Kevin Keller as Marcus
- VaLynn Rain as Katy
- Danny Hansen as Richard
- Morgan Galavan as Ice Cream Girl
- Beau Berglund as Male Detective
- Tasha Danvers as Female Detective
- Alexa Blanks as Secretary
- Joshua Dawson as Kenny

== Accolades ==
- Winner - Best Thriller - Topshorts Online Film Festival 2016
- Winner - Best Screenplay - #TOFF The Online Film Festival 2015
- Winner - Award of Merit Special Mention: Film Short - Best Shorts Competition 2015
- Official Selection - Tiburon International Film Festival 2015
- Official Selection - Con Film Festival: Philadelphia 2015/ Wizard World Comic Con Philadelphia
- Official Selection - Con Film Festival: Sacramento 2015/ Wizard World Comic Con Sacramento
- Official Selection - San Francisco Frozen Film Festival 2015
- Official Selection - Eureka Springs Indie Film Festival 2015
- Official Selection - Los Angeles CineFest 2015
- Official Selection - Village of Brewster Film Festival 2015
- Official Selection - #TOFF - The Online Film Festival 2015

== Notes ==
Reformation was shot in HD with Sony α7s. Two shots were taken with Canon 5d Mark III rigged on DJI Ronin.

== Locations ==
Reformation was shot in various locations of Los Angeles County (Los Angeles, Westminster, Anaheim, Culver City, Santa Monica) and the city of San Francisco.
