= ReGeneration (2010 film) =

- Theatrical release poster
- Directed by: Phillip Montgomery
- Written by: Phillip Montgomery
- Produced by: Christopher Lloyd Robert Baker; Matt DeRoss; Ryan Gosling; Jeremy Goulder; Joel Goulder
- Narrated by: Ryan Gosling
- Cinematography: Kevin Krupitzer
- Edited by: Brian Dickett
- Production company: Anonymous Content
- Release date: May 24, 2010 (Seattle International Film Festival)
- Running time: 81 minutes
- Country: United States
- Language: English

ReGeneration is a 2010 American documentary film written and directed by Phillip Montgomery that looks at the issues facing today's youth and young adults, and the influences that contribute to America's current culture of apathy toward to political and social causes.

== Background ==
ReGeneration was a co-production between Anonymous Content and Engine 7 Films, and premiered at the 2010 Seattle International Film Festival. The film was produced by Ryan Gosling, Matt DeRoss and Joel and Jeremy Goulder. Gosling acted as narrator for the film.

== Cast ==
The film features the participation of the late Howard Zinn, Noam Chomsky, Democracy Now!'s Amy Goodman, Adbusters Foundation's Kalle Lasn, Talib Kweli, STS9, Tucker Carlson and experts on media, pop culture, and education.

== Recognition ==
ReGeneration had its world premiere at the Seattle International Film Festival in 2010, where the film won the Youth Jury Award for Best FutureWave Feature.

However, Matt Goldberg of Collider and Chuck Bowen of Slant Magazine were more critical of the film mainly focusing on its treatment of Generation X adults and Generation Y youth as apathetic and addicted to technology.

== See also ==
- Occupy movement
