= Rakugo Story =

Rakugo Story (落語物語, Rakugo monogatari) is a Japanese film, released in 2012. Directed by Shinpei Hayashiya. The film centres on the Japanese art of "sit down" comedy, Rakugo. The film was shown as part of the 3rd Old Town Taito International Comedy Film Festival in September 2010, as well as the eigasai Film Festival in Czechoslovakia and was made with the assistance of the Rakugo Kyokai Association.

== Plotline ==
The main character, Masato, after seeing a rakugo performance, is himself inspired to enter the world of Rakugo storytelling. He becomes the apprentice of an established rakugo master by the name of Koroku Imadoya (Played by Pierre Taki). After a while, Masato receives the name “Koharu” and is himself promoted to “zenza” (performer who opens as first act). Koharu's life becomes challenging with his position as zenza, as well as his duties with Master Koroku and his wife Aoi (Tomoko Tabata), however, an unexpected incident happens that changes his life.

== Cast ==
- Anna Ishibashi
- Pierre Taki
- Shinkyo Kokontei
- Tokimatsu Sanyutei
- Kyūsaku Shimada
- Tomoko Tabata
