= Q Ball (film) =

2019 American documentary film

Q Ball is a 2019 American documentary film about the San Quentin Prison basketball team.
