= The Robbery (film) =

1953 film by Sami Ayanoğlu

- Directed by: Sami Ayanoğlu
- Written by: Sami Ayanoglu; Cevat Fehmi Baskut(play)
- Produced by: Cemil Filmer
- Starring: Sami Ayanoğlu; Talat Artemel; Suavi Tedü; Sadri Alışık; Aziz Basmacı; Heyecan Başaran; Saziye Moral; Uğur Boran; Berrin Aydan; Müfit Kiper; Kani Kıpçak; Reşit Gürzap
- Cinematography: Kriton Ilyadis
- Production company: Lale Film
- Release date: 1953
- Country: Turkey
- Language: Turkish

The Robbery (Turkish: Soygun) is a 1953 Turkish adventure film directed by Sami Ayanoglu.

== Cast ==
- Sami Ayanoglu
- Heyecan Basaran
- Sadri Alisik
- Suavi Tedü
- Talat Artemel
- Peruz Agopyan
- Sakir Arseven
- Atif Avci
- Berrin Aydan
- Necdet Mahfi Ayral
- Viktor Açikyan
- Aziz Basmaci

== Bibliography ==
- Burçak Evren. Türk sinema sanatçıları ansiklopedisi. Film-San Vakfı Yayınları, 1983.
