= Le Rire (film) =

1953 film by Maurice Régamey

- Directed by: Maurice Régamey
- Starring: Louis de Funès
- Release date: 1953
- Running time: Short film
- Country: France
- Language: French

Le Rire English: The Laugh, is a French comedy short film from 1953, directed by Maurice Régamey, starring Louis de Funès. Louis de Funès discusses and defines "the laugh."
