= Razing the Bar =

Razing the Bar is a documentary film about punk rock dive bar The Funhouse, located in Seattle, Washington. The film was produced and directed by Ryan Worsley and was a selection at the Seattle International Film Festival in 2014. The subject of the film is Seattle DJ and bar owner Brian Foss, who bought into The Funhouse in 2006 and turned it into a venue for both new and established international punk bands. The film chronicles the Funhouse's full history from its early days as Tex's Tavern, to Zak's in the 1990s, and finally reaching its end in 2012 when it was demolished by developers to make way for apartments. The film was a "Best of Seattle" pick for Best Documentary in the Seattle Weekly in 2014.
