= Roll on Columbia: Woody Guthrie and the Columbia River Songs =

Roll on Columbia: Woody Guthrie and the Columbia River Songs is a 2011 documentary film about Woody Guthrie's music created for Columbia River projects, particularly "Roll On, Columbia, Roll On". It premiered at McMenamin's Pub in Troutdale, Oregon. In the documentary, oral historian Michael O'Rourke is interviewed about Guthrie's month of songwriting in Oregon and Washington. O'Rourke also produced the film. The film was developed from a radio documentary that O'Rourke created for Oregon Public Broadcasting.
