= Questions à la terre natale =

- Directed by: Samba Felix N’diaye
- Screenplay by: Samba Felix N’diaye
- Produced by: La Huit Productions, Médiatik, Arte France
- Cinematography: Raphaël Popelier
- Edited by: Mariette Levy-Novion
- Music by: El Hadj Ndiaye
- Release date: 2006
- Running time: 52 minutes
- Countries: France; Senegal

Questions à la terre natale is a 2006 documentary film.

== Synopsis ==
Where is Africa going to? After forty years of regained independence, the African continent is in turmoil and is struggling with its contradictions, between its desire to be liberated from its colonial supervision and its dependence on the goodwill and the charity of rich countries. This film is a forum through which Africans themselves are asked about the way they see their continent and its leaders.
