= Quiet Nights of Blood and Pain =

- DVD released by Coppfilms and Tempe Video
- Directed by: Andrew Copp
- Written by: Andrew Copp
- Produced by: Andrew Copp; Amanda DeLotelle
- Starring: Ray Freeland; Loren S. Goins; Amanda DeLotelle
- Cinematography: Andrew Copp
- Edited by: Andrew Copp; Henrique Couto
- Music by: Andrew Copp; Canned Monster
- Production company: Coppfilms
- Distributed by: Coppfilms; Tempe Video
- Release date: March 5, 2009 (United States)
- Running time: 75 minutes
- Country: United States
- Language: English

Quiet Nights of Blood and Pain is a 2009 American horror film written and directed by Andrew Copp. It was the last feature-length film that Copp shot prior to his death in 2013.

== Plot ==
In 2007, William, a psychotic Iraq veteran, murders a war protester and the man's girlfriend, and poses their bodies in a manner evocative of incidents such as Abu Ghraib. Elsewhere, Adrienne, another veteran of the conflict in the Middle East, learns that she will be receiving no government assistance for her posttraumatic stress disorder, which drives her to try to cope with it via marijuana that she procures from Ray, a friend who served in the Vietnam War.

While at a bookstore, William is enraged by the liberal views expressed by two of the clerks, so he kills them, and covers their corpses with pages ripped out of a copy of The Interrogators: Inside the Secret War Against al-Qaeda. After accompanying Ray to a group therapy session, Adrienne is attacked by a pair of rapists, but she is saved by William, who stabs the criminals to death while Adrienne flees.

William subsequently waterboards and beheads a janitor who was a member of an environmental activist group, gives money to a homeless and hobbled veteran, converses with Daniel, his jingoistic older brother who was disfigured in the Gulf War, and kills two supporters of MoveOn.org. Adrienne, who a suspicious William begins to stalk, contemplates suicide due to her worsening mental state, which leads her to take peyote provided by Ray.

William slits Ray's throat, convinced that he is a dissident, and abducts Adrienne, who he tortures for "disloyalty" and to try to obtain information on other "Un-Americans". Adrienne breaks free of her restraints and tries to escape, but is fatally stabbed by William. A spasming Adrienne hacks William in the neck with a meat cleaver, and the two die together while William whispers, "I was just following orders."

== Cast ==
- Amanda DeLotelle as Adrienne
- Loren S. Goins as William
- Ray Freeland as Ray
- Nic Pesante as Peter
- Courtney C. Jenkins as Sandra
- Stefee Shirmer as Stefanie
- Mike Wilkinson as Mike
- Dave Crouse as Dave
- Adam Eckley as Homeless Vet
- Henrique Couto as School Janitor
- Bryan Brassfield as Rapist #1
- Matt Brassfield as Rapist #2
- Greg Nichols as Liberal Husband
- Kristie Cox as Liberal Wife
- Juliet Fromholt as Bus Stop Girl
- Kimberly Mitchem as Vet at Meeting #1
- G. Mitchem as Vet at Meeting #2
- Andrew Copp as Daniel

== Reception ==
The film was well received by Craig McGee of Horror News, who wrote, "If you're expecting huge production values and top-notch professional actors, and THX sound, then you'll probably want to sit this one out. But those of us that love and embrace the indie horror world will be enjoying watching what everyone did with obviously so little money to get the job done. In the end, I was impressed, at times shocked, and once or twice even a little moved by it all". Rogue Cinema's Brian Morton also commended Quiet Night of Blood and Pain, awarding it a score of 3/4, and noting that "it's not perfect, but it's a cool throwback to a lost era of filmmaking and Copp should be commended for doing this!"
