= Reclaim Wasteland =

1926 film

- Traditional Chinese: 殖邊外史
- Simplified Chinese: 殖边外史
- Literal meaning: Unofficial History of Reclaiming Borderlands
- Hanyu Pinyin: Zhí Biān Wài Shǐ
- Directed by: Wang Yuanlong
- Starring: Wang Yuanlong; Li Minghui; Wang Cilong
- Cinematography: S.M. Chow
- Release date: 1926
- Running time: ~39 minutes (extant version, incomplete)
- Country: Republic of China
- Languages: Silent film, with Chinese intertitles

Reclaim Wasteland is a 1926 Chinese silent film directed by Wang Yuanlong who also starred in it. It is one of the earliest Chinese films that have survived, although a portion is missing.

The story celebrates free love among young rural people. Wang conscientiously focused on traditional Chinese cultures, but while the film received positive reviews, it flopped at the Shanghai box office, leading Wang to conclude that "Our fellow countrymen had a strong admiration for the West."

== Plot ==
The orphaned Guisheng lives with her cousin Ah Zhen and her family in Liuhe Township, working as an agricultural laborer in the fields. Ah Zhen's parents have hired a few other farmhands, including Cinque and the dimwitted Cater. Guisheng and Ah Zhen are very much in love, as are Cinque and Mao Yuan, another local girl. Ah Zhen's parents also believe they would become two couples when they grow up. Every night, the teenagers gather around the barn and have fun.

Ah Zhen's mother has worked nonstop ever since she got married eleven years ago, and it has taken a toll on her health. One day, feeling dizzy, she suddenly collapses and dies. Ah Zhen and others try to fill her void in the kitchen, but the results are more often funny than delicious. Her father finally decides to get a second wife, and Zhou becomes Ah Zhen's stepmother. They don't get along, and when her father doesn't side with her Ah Zhen goes to her mother's grave to cry. Zhou's nephew Shunqing wants to marry Ah Zhen. He approaches Zhou and convinces her that the marriage would also benefit her.

Around this time, soldiers from the Beiyang government arrive calling for young farmhands to join them and reclaim land in border regions. Zhou wants Guisheng out of her nephew's way, so she demands that he goes. When Guisheng and Cinque leave for the hinterland, Ah Zhen tells Guisheng to wait for her no matter what. After their departure, Zhou quick arranges for Ah Zhen to marry Shunqing. Ah Zhen falls ill, and before the wedding she hands a letter to Mao Yuan to mail to Guisheng. On her wedding night, Ah Zhen tries to stab Shunqing with a hidden knife. The next morning, villagers discover a woman's body in the well. They hurry to the bridal chamber and find Shunqing's body as well as Ah Zhen's suicide note.

In the border regions, many peasants fall ill due to lack of water. Guisheng and Cinque are surprised when they receive letters from their lovers back home. The letter from Ah Zhen just encourages Guisheng to succeed. Cinque, on the other hand, is shocked by what Mao Yuan tells her. He decides not to tell Guisheng about Ah Zhen's death.

(Parts of the film are missing, but the likely scenario is: Guisheng is determined to visit home, so he and Cinque begin their long journey back. They somehow meet Mao Yuan and her father, who decide to follow them back to the borders.)

When they reach their reclaimed land, they are shocked to find Ah Zhen and Cater. Cater begins to speak. It turns out that Shunqing had a jealous lover who came to the bridal chamber on his wedding night, and they stabbed each other to death with Ah Zhen's knife. With the help of Cater, Ah Zhen dumped her body in the well, wrote a suicide note to mislead the villagers, and escaped. Having told his story, Cater introduces his girlfriend to the group. Everyone is ecstatic.

== Cast ==
- Li Minghui as Ah Zhen
- Wang Yuanlong as Guisheng
- Wang Cilong as Cinque
- Yang Jingwo as Mao Yuan
- Shao He as Cater
- Wang Jinming as Ah Zhen's mother
- Xie Yunqing as Ah Zhen's father
- Zhou Wenzhu as Zhou
- Wang Zhengxin as Officer
