= Rok 1863 =

1922 film

- Release date: 1922
- Country: Poland

Rok 1863 is a Polish historical film. It was released in 1922.

== Cast ==
- Aleksander Zelwerowicz - Aleksander Wielopolski
- Ryszard Sobiszewski - Książę Odrowąż
- Stanisława Chrzanowska - Księżna Odrowążyna
- Antoni Bednarczyk - Rudecki
- Helena Marcello-Palińska - Rudecka
- Maria Hryniewicz - Salomea Brynicka
- Stanisław Hryniewicz - Antoni Brynicki
- Kazimierz Lasocki - Szczepan
- Mieczysław Gielniewski
- Henryk Rydzewski
