= The Rebound (2016 film) =

2016 documentary film by Shaina Koren Allen

- Directed by: Shaina Koren Allen
- Written by: Brian Gordon
- Story by: Marshall Davis Jones
- Produced by: Pete D'Arruda; Michael Esposito; Josh Felber; William Parker; Rizi Timane
- Starring: Mario Moran; Jeremie "Phenom" Thomas; Orlando Carrillo
- Cinematography: Shaina Koren Allen; Chad Andreo Philp; Michael Esposito
- Edited by: Jeremy Bircher; Shaina Koren Allen
- Music by: Abel Okugawa; Jeremie "Phenom" Thomas; Mandy Harvey
- Production companies: Evergrain Studios; DNA Films
- Release date: March 5, 2016 (Miami)
- Running time: 63 minutes
- Country: United States
- Languages: English; Spanish

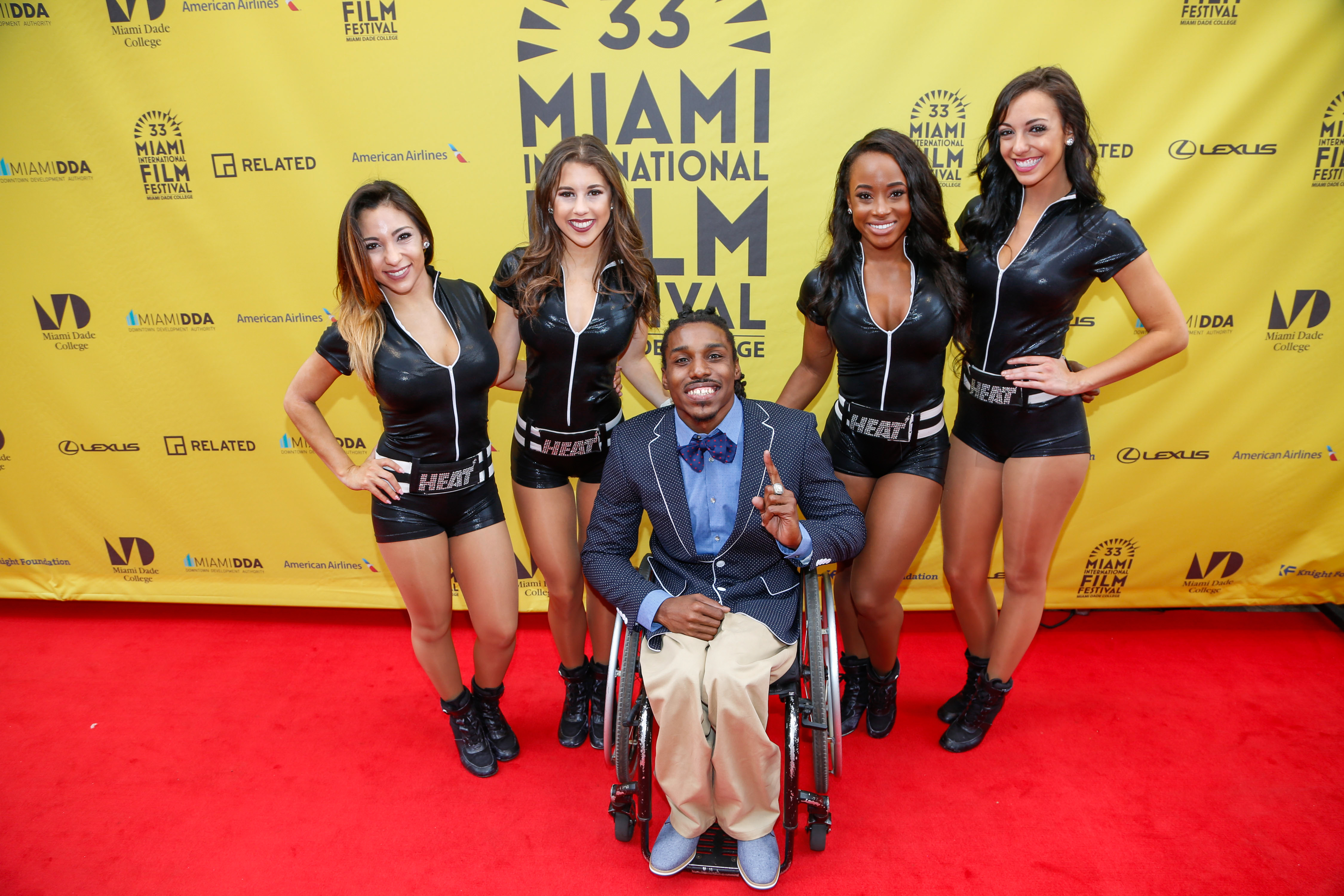
Jeremie Thomas and the Miami Heat dancers at the 2016 Miami International Film Festival presentation of the documentary.

The Rebound (originally titled The Rebound: A Wheelchair Basketball Story) is a 2016 sports documentary film directed by Shaina Koren Allen, starring adaptive athletes Mario Moran, Jeremie "Phenom" Thomas, Orlando Carrillo of the Miami Heat Wheels wheelchair basketball team. The film follows the team's quest for the national championship. It features appearances from coaches, Paralympic athletes, and family members.

The Rebound premiered at the Miami International Film Festival in 2016, and went on to screen at a variety of film festivals, including Cinequest, Napa Valley Film Festival, Dallas Film Festival, Brooklyn Film Festival, and Naples International Film Festival. The film was released to digital HD on November 20, 2018.

== Awards ==
- Cinequest Kaiser Permanente Thrive Award
- Brooklyn Film Festival Audience Award for Best Documentary
- Gallup Film Festival Awards for Best Documentary Feature and Best Editing (Documentary)
