= Red State (2006 film) =

- Directed by: Michael Shea
- Written by: Michael Shea
- Release date: June 7, 2006 (Jackson Hole Film Festival)
- Running time: 81 minutes
- Country: United States
- Language: English

Red State is a documentary film by Michael Shea. The film follows the director into America's red states (those with predominantly Republican voters) to find out why so many Americans chose to re-elect President George W. Bush in the 2004 presidential elections.
