= Rerun (film) =

- Film poster
- Directed by: Alyssa Rallo Bennett
- Written by: Gary O. Bennett
- Produced by: Alyssa Rallo Bennett; Gary O. Bennett
- Starring: Christopher Lloyd
- Cinematography: Fidel Ruiz-Healy; Eric LaPlante
- Edited by: Veronica Pomilla; Pati Amoroso
- Music by: Ethan Gustavson
- Production companies: Stonestreet Studios; Jamaad Productions
- Release date: October 15, 2018 (Woodstock)
- Running time: 91 minutes
- Country: United States
- Language: English

Rerun is a 2018 American drama film directed by Alyssa Rallo Bennett and starring Christopher Lloyd.

== Cast ==
- Christopher Lloyd
- Andrew Bridges
- Amelia Dudley
- Allison Frasca
- Shannon Kronstadt
- Danielle Lebron
- Tre’von Lyle
- Teo Rapp-Olsson
- Rishon Salters

== Release ==
The film premiered at the Woodstock Film Festival on October 15, 2018.

== Reception ==
Caryn James of The Hollywood Reporter gave the film a negative review and wrote, "It seems like an act of immense generosity that Christopher Lloyd has added his warm, affecting presence to ReRun, an otherwise pallid and clumsy contemporary spin on It's a Wonderful Life."
