= Quality Time (2017 film) =

2017 film

- Film poster
- Directed by: Daan Bakker
- Written by: Daan Bakker
- Starring: Noel Keulen
- Release date: 30 January 2017
- Running time: 85 minutes
- Country: Netherlands
- Languages: Dutch; Norwegian

Quality Time is a 2017 Dutch drama film directed by Daan Bakker. It was shortlisted by the EYE Film Institute Netherlands as one of the eight films to be selected as the potential Dutch submission for the Academy Award for Best Foreign Language Film at the 90th Academy Awards. However, it was not selected, with Layla M. being chosen as the Dutch entry.

== Cast ==
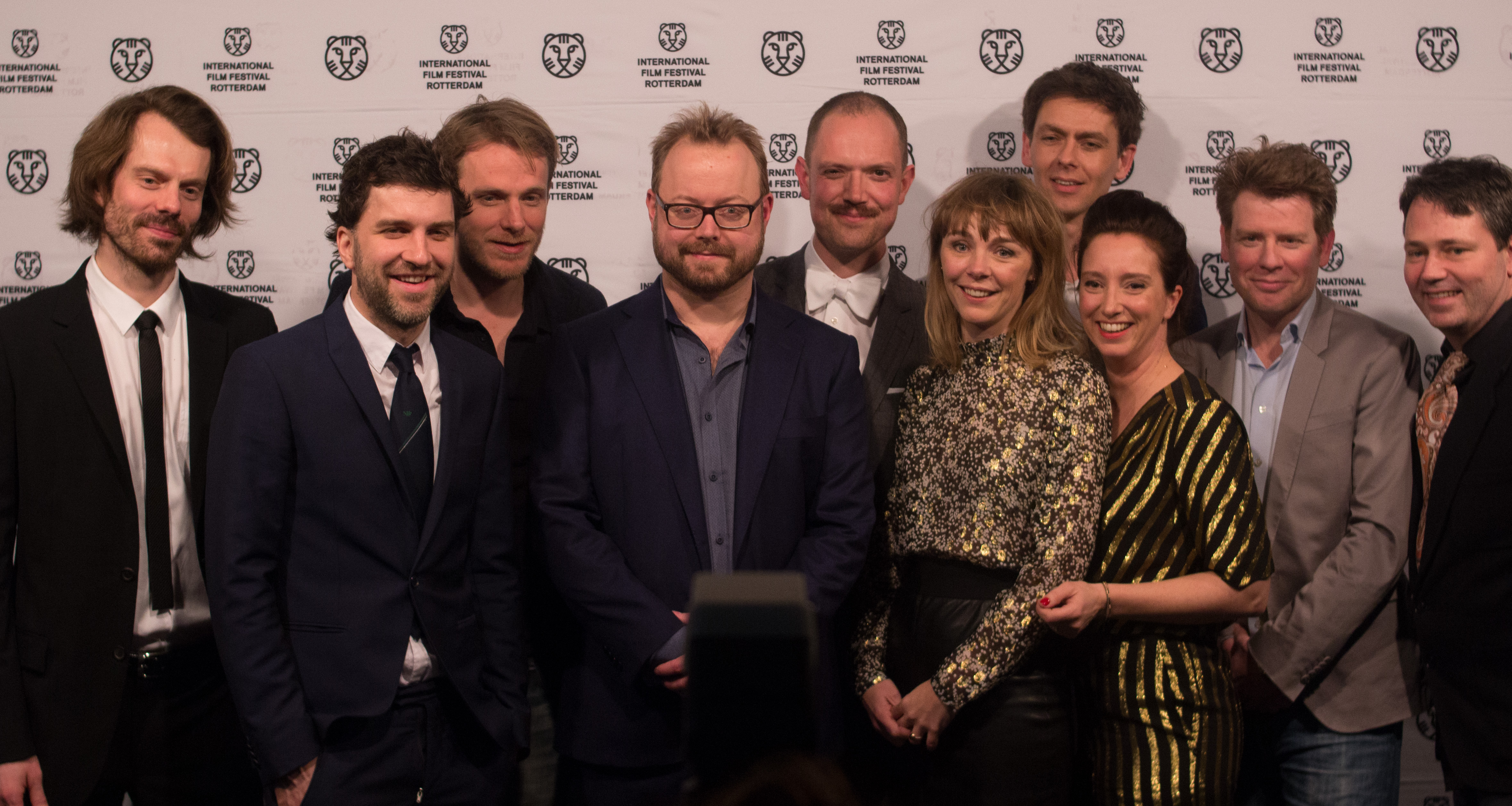
Cast & Crew at the International Film Festival Rotterdam 2017

- Noel Keulen
- Thomas Aske Berg
- Giulio D'Anna
- Steve Aernouts
