= Rec (film series) =

Spanish horror film franchise

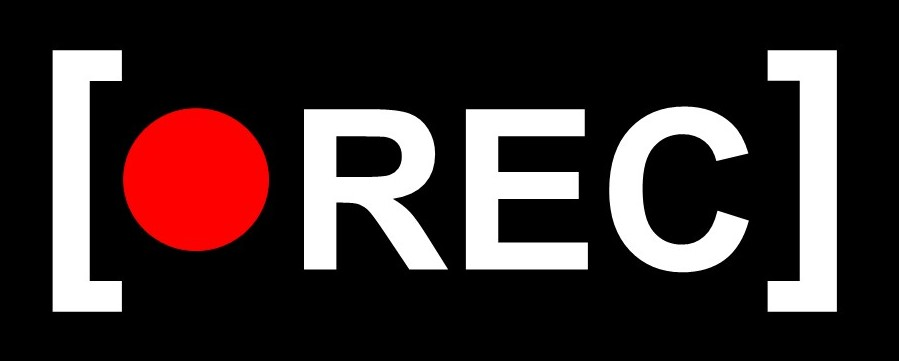
- Self-made logo artwork
- Directed by: Jaume Balagueró; Paco Plaza
- Written by: Paco Plaza; Luis Berdejo; Jaume Balagueró; Manu Diez; David Gallart
- Produced by: Julio Fernández
- Starring: Manuela Velasco
- Cinematography: Pablo Rosso
- Edited by: David Gallart
- Production companies: Filmax; Castelao Producciones
- Distributed by: Filmax International
- Release dates: 2007 (Rec); 2009 (Rec 2); 2012 (Rec 3: Genesis); 2014 (Rec 4: Apocalypse)
- Country: Spain
- Language: Spanish

Rec (stylized as [•REC]) is a Spanish found footage supernatural horror film franchise. The original 2007 film was shot in Barcelona, Spain and the title is an abbreviation of the word "record", as it appears on a video camera.

The first Rec film was followed by three sequels; Rec 2 in 2009, Rec 3: Genesis in 2012, and Rec 4: Apocalypse in 2014 as the final installment in the franchise. Spanish company Filmax is responsible for the production of the REC franchise and released all four installments.

The series lead protagonist, Ángela Vidal, is portrayed by actress Manuela Velasco in all the installments the character appears in (Rec 3: Genesis. being the exception).

Actor Javier Botet portrays Tristana Medeiros, the series main antagonist.

The first film was remade in the United States as the 2008 film Quarantine. Quarantine 2: Terminal was released in 2011. Although the sequel's plot picks up directly from where Quarantine leaves off, it is not a remake of Rec 2. Quarantine 2: Terminal takes the series in a completely different direction with its own rules and mythology different from those of the Rec series.

== Cast ==
List indicators
- This table shows the principal characters and the actors who have portrayed them throughout the franchise.
- A dark grey cell indicates the character was not in the film, or that the character's presence in the film has not yet been announced.
- A ^{C} indicates a cameo appearance.
- A ^{A} indicates an appearance in archival footage only.
- A ^{V} indicates a voice only role.

Character	Original series					
Character	Rec	Rec 2			Rec 3 Genesis	Rec 4 Apocalypse
Character	2007	2009			2012	2014
La Niña Medeiros Tristana Medeiros Da Souza	Javier Botet Roser Aldabó^{V}	Javier Botet Claudia Silva	Manuela Velasco Jonathan Mellor^{V}	Pau Poch Nico Baixas^{V}	Javier Botet^{C}	Paco Manzanedo Javier Botet^{A}
Ángela Vidal	Manuela Velasco	Manuela Velasco	Manuela Velasco	Manuela Velasco		Manuela Velasco
Manu	Ferrán Terraza	Ferrán Terraza	Ferrán Terraza	Ferrán Terraza		Ferrán Terraza
César	Carlos Lasarte	Carlos Lasarte	Carlos Lasarte	Carlos Lasarte		Carlos Lasarte
Pablo	Pablo Rosso	Pablo Rosso	Pablo Rosso	Pablo Rosso		Pablo Rosso^{A}
Álex	David Vert	David Vert	David Vert	David Vert		
Sergio	Jorge-Yaman Serrano	Jorge-Yaman Serrano	Jorge-Yaman Serrano	Jorge-Yaman Serrano		Jorge-Yaman Serrano^{A}
Mari Carmen	María Lanau	María Lanau	María Lanau	María Lanau		
Jennifer Carmen	Claudia Silva	Claudia Silva	Claudia Silva	Claudia Silva		
Mrs. Izquierdo	Martha Carbonell	Martha Carbonell	Martha Carbonell	Martha Carbonell		Martha Carbonell^{A}
Guillem Marimón	Carlos Vicente					Carlos Vicente^{A}
Japanese Family	Akemi Goto					
Japanese Family	Chen Min Kao					
Japanese Family	Daniel Trinh					
Older Policeman	Vicente Gil					
Elderly Couple	María Teresa Ortega	María Teresa Ortega	María Teresa Ortega	María Teresa Ortega		
Elderly Couple	Manuel Bronchud	Manuel Bronchud	Manuel Bronchud	Manuel Bronchud		
Colombian Girl	Ana Velasquez					
Mr.Carmen	Mentioned	Pep Molina	Pep Molina	Pep Molina		
Dr. Owen		Jonathan Mellor	Jonathan Mellor	Jonathan Mellor		
Chief Fernández		Oscar Sánchez Zafra	Oscar Sánchez Zafra	Oscar Sánchez Zafra		
Martos		Alejandro Casaseca	Alejandro Casaseca	Alejandro Casaseca		
Larra		Ariel Casas	Ariel Casas	Ariel Casas		
Rosso		Pablo Rosso	Pablo Rosso	Pablo Rosso		
Mire		Andrea Ros	Andrea Ros	Andrea Ros		
Tito		Pau Poch	Pau Poch	Pau Poch		
Ori		Àlex Batllori	Àlex Batllori	Àlex Batllori		
Old Lady					María Alfonsa Rosso	María Alfonsa Rosso
Clara					Leticia Dolera	Mentioned
Koldo					Diego Martin	Mentioned
Rafa					Ismael Martinez	
Adrián					Àlex Monner	
Pepe Victor					Emilio Mencheta	
Menchu					Mireia Ros	
Atun					Sr. B	
Guzmán						Paco Manzanedo
Nick						Ismael Fritschi
Lucas						Crispulo Cabezas
Dr. Ricarte						Héctor Colomé
Jesu						Emilio Baule
Dr. Ginard						Paco Obregón
Edwin						Cristian Aquino

=== Cast (remakes) ===
Character	Remake series	
Character	Quarantine	Quarantine 2: Terminal
Character	2008	2011
Angela Vidal	Jennifer Carpenter	
Scott Percival	Steve Harris	
Jake	Jay Hernandez	
George Fletcher	Johnathon Schaech	
Danny Wilensky	Columbus Short	
James McCreedy	Andrew Fiscella	
Yuri Ivanov	Rade Sherbedgia	
Lawrence	Greg Germann	
Bernard	Bernard White	
Sadie	Dania Ramirez	
Wanda Marimon	Elaine Kagan	
Kathy	Marin Hinkle	
Briana	Joey King	
Randy	Denis O'Hare	
Elise Jackson	Stacy Chbosky	
Mrs. Espinoza	Martha Carbonell	
Thin Infected Man	Doug Jones	
Jenny		Mercedes Mason
George		Mattie Liptak
Henry		Josh Cooke
Shilah Washington		Noree Victoria
Ed Ramirez		Ignacio Serricchio
Niall Britz		Phillip Devona
Susan Britz		Julie Gribble
Hvost		Tyler Kunkle
Nicca		Erin Aine Smith
Louise Tredwell		Sandra Lafferty
Preston		Lamar Stewart
Doc Stevens		Tom Thon
Bev Stevens		Lynn Cole
Paula		Bre Blair
Ralph Budnt		George Black
Captain Forrest		John Curran
Sylvester		Judd Lormand
Lee Blake		Blake Mason
