= Quarantine 2: Terminal =

2011 American horror film sequel

- Theatrical release poster
- Directed by: John Pogue
- Screenplay by: John Pogue
- Based on: Quarantine by; John Erick Dowdle; and Drew Dowdle; Rec by; Jaume Balagueró; Luiso Berdejo and; Paco Plaza
- Produced by: Doug Davison; Roy Lee; Sergio Aguero; Marc Brienstock
- Starring: Mercedes Mason (Note: Credited as "Mercedes Masöhn" in the end credits of the film.); Josh Cooke; Mattie Liptak; Ignacio Serricchio; Noree Victoria; Bre Blair; Lamar Stewart
- Cinematography: Matthew Irving
- Edited by: William Yeh
- Production companies: Lightning Entertainment; RCR Media Group; Stage 6 Films; Vertigo Entertainment; Andale Pictures
- Distributed by: Sony Pictures Home Entertainment
- Release dates: January 27, 2011 (Gérardmer Film Festival); June 17, 2011 (United States)
- Running time: 86 minutes
- Country: United States
- Language: English

Quarantine 2: Terminal is a 2011 American horror film and a sequel to the 2008 film, Quarantine. It was written and directed by John Pogue and produced by Marc Brienstock. The film stars Mercedes Mason, Josh Cooke and Mattie Liptak as passengers on an airplane where the mutant rabies virus from the previous film is now spreading, forcing the plane to make an emergency landing at a terminal that is promptly surrounded by the government, trapping the passengers and crew as they search for answers and a means of escape.

Although the first film was a remake of the Spanish film Rec, Quarantine 2 has no relation to any of the REC films and has an entirely different plot and setting. The film received mixed reviews from critics.

== Plot ==
On a flight from Los Angeles to Kansas City, passenger Ralph Bundt becomes violent and attempts to enter the cockpit. Ralph had been bitten by a lab rat, brought onto the plane by Henry, who claimed they were his classroom's pet hamsters. Ralph bites flight attendant Paula on the face, to the horror of her colleague Jenny. Captain Forrest and First Officer Willsy land the plane at the nearest city. Disobeying orders, they pull up to a jetway operated by baggage handler Ed Ramirez. Everyone flees the plane except for elderly couple Bev and Doc Stevens, and the pilots who try to contain Ralph in a bathroom. The passengers find that they have been locked out of the terminal which is quickly surrounded by armed soldiers and CDC scientists.

Passenger Shilah Washington reveals she has a medical kit in her bag in the cargo hold. Jenny, Henry, Ed, and fellow passengers Niall and Preston go to retrieve it. There they find the bathroom empty and covered in blood. Preston gets Doc off the plane while the others retrieve Shilah's kit and Niall's handgun. Jenny is attacked by an infected Captain Forrest. Niall shoots and kills him but is splattered by the captain's blood. Leaving the plane, they find Preston's body and avoid an infected Bev.

Rejoining the others, the group deduces that the infection is probably a form of rabies spread through bites. When Doc is bitten by an infected rat, they lock him and Paula away. George, an unaccompanied minor, tells the others that Henry brought the rats onto the plane. As Henry tells Jenny that George is just confused, they are attacked by the escaped Ralph, but kill him with the help of Ed and Shilah.

Four heavily armed officers arrive to administer drugs to the group, but they also release the infected passengers from their confinement. Passenger Louise Treadwell is bitten by her infected cat, while the infected Doc bites one of the officers. After shooting Doc, the officers and a passenger named Hvorst attempt to evacuate but are shot and killed by personnel outside the doors. Hvorst's girlfriend, Nicca is left distraught. Ed drags one surviving officer back inside. The survivors hear the screams of the infected (at this point they are Willsy, Louise, Preston, and Paula). Ed points out an airport catering truck the survivors can hide in. As the others clamber inside the truck, Niall and Susan share a loving embrace until Niall begins to drool and turns. Henry and the others grab Susan and begin pulling her into the truck. Niall, fully turned, grabs her from the back and pulls her off the truck floor. The group in the truck question the wounded officer who reveals that he does not represent the CDC but rather CBDT—Chemical Biological Domestic Terrorism, a division of the Department of Homeland Security that specializes in countering chemical and biological terrorism. He tells them about a quarantined building in Los Angeles that housed a lab for a group of bioterrorists and confirms that the drugs are only experimental antidotes. The wounded officer then shoots himself. Just as Ed suggests escaping through an old drainage tunnel beneath the terminal, Willsy appears on the roof of the truck. George raises the truck and crushes Willsy.

The survivors access the tunnel though Nicca is attacked and dragged away. Jenny kills an attacking Paula. While searching for directions to the tunnel, the group is attacked by Niall and Susan. Henry kills them but he is bitten. George confronts him with suspicious documents concerning viruses that he found in Henry's briefcase. Henry admits to being part of the terrorist cell at the apartment building who have planned a worldwide plague to cull the human population. After a struggle, Henry shoots and kills Ed, administers his trial antidote to himself, and then kidnaps George to use him as a human shield. Shilah and Jenny separate to find George and Henry.

While searching for George and Henry, Jenny is chased and attacked by an infected Preston. Running along the baggage conveyor belts Jenny eventually taunts him into crawling into part of the machinery and kills him. Continuing to look for George, Jenny quietly sneaks past an infected Nicca. Shilah finds Jenny and gives her the officer's thermal goggles. She then reveals to Jenny that she has been bitten and sacrifices herself to distract the infected others so Jenny can escape. While escaping into a wall, Jenny is attacked by an infected Louise but she knocks her unconscious with a wrench. Jenny uses the goggles and finds George near the tunnel where he tells her the antidote has failed and that Henry is infected. Henry then appears and attacks her. After a struggle with Jenny, George shoots him and Jenny bashes in his skull.

As Jenny and George crawl through the dark drainage tunnel, George sees through the thermal goggles that she has been bitten. Jenny encourages George to leave her, stating that she doesn't have long until she succumbs to the infection. But George refuses stating that he won't leave without her. Reluctantly, Jenny agrees to continue along the tunnel. As the pair advance, George sees light and hears birds towards the end of the tunnel, excitedly exclaiming to Jenny that they are nearly free. George squeezes through the bars but is remiss to see that Jenny is no longer behind him. As he calls for her, an infected Jenny now fully consumed by the virus, launches towards him. She attempts to bite George but can only get to his hood. He strips off his hoodie and turns to see Jenny unable to fit through the bars he just came through. She screams at him with red eyes as George discards the thermal vision goggles. Through them, Louise's infected cat is seen walking towards the Luxor Las Vegas hotel, implying that the plane landed at McCarran International Airport and that all efforts to contain the virus have failed.

== Cast ==
- Mercedes Mason (credited as Mercedes Masöhn) as Jenny
- Mattie Liptak as George
- Josh Cooke as Henry
- Noree Victoria as Shilah Washington
- Ignacio Serricchio as Ed Ramirez
- Bre Blair as Paula
- Phillip Devona as Niall Britz
- Julie Gribble as Susan Britz
- Erin Aine Smith as Nicca
- Tyler Kunkle as Hvorst
- Sandra Lafferty as Louise Tredwell
- Lamar Stewart as Preston
- Tom Thon as Doc Stevens
- Lynn Cole as Bev Stevens
- George Back as Ralph Bundt
- John Curran as Captain Forrest
- Andrew Benator as Willsy
- Jason Benjamin as CDC #1
- Beau Turpin as CDC #2
- Neko Parham as CDC #3
- Judd Lormand as Sylvester
- Blake Mason as Lee Blake

== Production ==
In May 2010, a sequel to Quarantine began moving forward at Screen Gems with John Pogue writing and directing and Robert Green Hall returning as the film's makeup designer. The following month, Bloody Disgusting reported the film was scheduled to begin filming in Los Angeles, California with Mercedes Mason and Josh Cooke cast as in the lead roles. Filming was moved to Atlanta and Griffin, Georgia, with a majority of the film being shot in an abandoned distribution facility. Production ended in July 2010. Unlike its predecessor, the film is not presented in the found footage format. Instead Pogue opted to shoot the film handheld, in the style of filmmakers such as Rodrigo Prieto and Paul Greengrass.

== Release ==
On January 27, 2011, Quarantine 2: Terminal debuted at the Gérardmer Film Festival in France. The film was given a limited release in theaters on June 17, 2011. The DVD was released on August 2, 2011, in the United States.

== Critical reception ==
Quarantine 2: Terminal received an approval of 67% on Rotten Tomatoes with an average rating of 5.42/10, based on 9 reviews.

Some critics have positively received the film's use of special effects and the scares, but have criticized the lack of character development and originality.

== See also ==
- Flight of the Living Dead: Outbreak on a Plane
- Snakes on a Plane
