= Festival international du film fantastique de Gérardmer =

Film festival in France

- Location: Gérardmer, France
- Founded: 1994; 32 years ago
- Festival date: Annually, last week of January
- Website: festival-gerardmer.com

The Festival international du film fantastique de Gérardmer, formerly known as Fantastica and then Fantastic'Arts, is an annual international film festival of horror and science fiction films.

== History ==
The film festival has been held each year since 1994 in Gérardmer in the Vosges, France towards the end of January. It replaced an earlier film festival which was held in Avoriaz for 20 years, from 1973 until 1993.

Originally, the festival was called Fantastica, then Fantastic'Arts, to stress the artistic as well as the fantastique side of the festival. In 2008 the festival was renamed Festival international du film fantastique de Gérardmer.

== Description ==
Each year, several celebrities form a jury to judge the competing films. Some also present their own work, including the writer Bernard Werber, who comes each year to Place du Tilleul at the centre of the town.

== Grand Prize ==
Year	Title of film	Director	Nationality
1994	Jiang-Hu, Between Love And Glory	Ronny Yu	Hong Kong
1995	Heavenly Creatures	Peter Jackson	New Zealand
1996	El Dia de la Bestia	Alex de la Iglesia	Spain
1997	Scream	Wes Craven	United States
1998	An American Werewolf in Paris	Anthony Waller	France, Luxembourg, Netherlands, United Kingdom, United States
1999	Cube	Vincenzo Natali	Canada
2000	Stir of Echoes	David Koepp	United States
2001	Thomas est amoureux	Pierre-Paul Renders	France, Belgium
2002	Fausto 5.0	Isidro Ortiz, Alex Ollé et Carlos Padrissa	Spain
2003	Honogurai mizu no soko kara	Hideo Nakata	Japan
2004	Janghwa, Hongryeon	Kim Jee-woon	South Korea
2005	Duplicity (Trouble)	Harry Cleven	Belgium
2006	Isolation	Billy O'Brien	Ireland, United Kingdom
2007	Norway of Life (Den brysomme mannen)	Jens Lien	Norway
2008	The Orphanage (El Orfanato)	Juan Antonio Bayona	Mexico, Spain
2009	Let The Right One In (Låt den rätte komma in)	Tomas Alfredson	Sweden
2010	The Door (Die Tür)	Anno Saul	Germany
2011	Bedevilled (Kim Bok-nam salinsageonui jeonmal)	Jang Cheol-soo	South Korea
2012	Babycall	Pal Sletaune	Norway
2013	Mama	Andrés Muschietti	Spain
2014	Miss Zombie	SABU	Japan
2015	It Follows	David Robert Mitchell	United States
2016	Bone Tomahawk	S. Craig Zahler	United States
2017	Raw	Julia Ducournau	France, Belgium
2018	Incident in a Ghost Land	Pascal Laugier	France, Canada
2019	Puppet Master: The Littlest Reich	Sonny Laguna and Tommy Wiklund	United States
2020	Saint Maud	Rose Glass	United Kingdom
2021	Possessor	Brandon Cronenberg	Canada, United Kingdom
2022	Hatching	Hanna Bergholm	Finland, Sweden
2023	Piety	Eduardo Casanova	Argentina, Spain
2024	Sleep	Jason Yu	South Korea
2025	In a Violent Nature	Chris Nash	Canada
2026	Mother's Baby	Johanna Moder	Austria, Switzerland, Germany

== Special Prize (or Jury Prize) ==
Year	Title	Director	Nationality
1994	La ardilla roja	Julio Medem	Spain
1995	Dellamorte Dellamore	Michele Soavi	France, Italy
1996	Mute Witness	Anthony Waller	Germany, Russia, United Kingdom
1997	Nur über meine Leiche	Rainer Matsutani	Germany
1998	Gattaca	Andrew Niccol	United States
1998	Photographing Fairies	Nick Willing	United Kingdom
1999	The Wisdom of Crocodiles	Po-Chih Leong	United Kingdom
1999	Bride Of Chucky	Ronny Yu	United States
2000	Los sin nombre	Jaume Balagueró	Spain
2001	Chasing Sleep	Michael Walker	United States
2002	El Espinazo del Diablo	Guillermo del Toro	Spain
2003	Maléfique	Éric Valette	France
2003	The Gathering	Brian Gilbert	United Kingdom
2004	The Happiness of the Katakuris	Takashi Miike	Japan
2005	Saw	James Wan	United States
2005	The Ordeal (Calvaire)	Fabrice Du Welz	Belgium
2006	Fragile	Jaume Balagueró	Spain
2007	Black Sheep	Jonathan King	New Zealand
2007	Fido	Andrew Currie	Canada
2008	REC	Jaume Balagueró and Paco Plaza	Spain
2009	Grace	Paul Solet	Canada, United States
2010	Moon	Duncan Jones	United Kingdom
2011	We Are What We Are (Somos los que hay)	Jorge Michel Gra	Mexico
2011	The Loved Ones	Sean Byrne	Australia
2012	Beast	Christoffer Boe	Denmark
2012	The Awakening	Nick Murphy	United Kingdom
2013	The End	Jorge Torregrossa	Spain
2013	Mama	Andres Muschietti	Canada, Spain
2014	The Babadook	Jennifer Kent	Australia
2015	The Voices	Marjane Satrapi	Germany, United States
2015	Ex Machina	Alex Garland	United Kingdom
2016	Évolution	Lucile Hadžihalilović	Belgium, France, Spain
2016	JeruZalem	Doron Paz, Yoav Paz	Israel
2017	Under the Shadow	Babak Anvari	Iran, Jordan, Qatar, United Kingdom
2017	They Call Me Jeeg Robot	Gabriele Mainetti	Italy
2018	As Boas Maneiras	Marco Dutra, Juliana Rojas	Brazil
2018	Les Affamés	Robin Aubert	Canada
2019	The Unthinkable	Victor Danell / Crazy Pictures	Sweden
2019	Aniara	Pella Kagerman	Sweden
2020	Howling Village	Takashi Shimizu	Japan
2021	Sleep	Michael Venus	Germany
2021	Teddy	Ludovic Boukherma, Zoran Boukherma	France
2022	The Grandmother	Paco Plaza	France, Spain
2022	You Are Not My Mother	Kate Dolan	Ireland
2023	The Mountain	Thomas Salvador	France
2023	Piaffe	Ann Oren	Germany
2024	Amelia's Children	Gabriel Abrantes	Portugal
2024	For Night Will Come	Céline Rouzet	France
2025	Exhuma	Jang Jae-hyeon	South Korea
2025	Rumours	Guy Maddin, Evan Johnson, Galen Johnson	Canada, Germany, Hungary, United States
2026	The Weed Eaters	Callum Devlin	New Zealand
2026	Cadet	Adilkhan Yerzhanov	Kazakhstan

== Critics' Prize ==
Year	Title	Director	Nationality
1994	The Red Squirrel (La ardilla roja)	Julio Medem	Spain
1995	Accumulator 1 (Akumulátor 1)	Jan Svěrák	Czech Republic
1996	The Secret of Roan Inish	John Sayles	United States, Ireland
1997	Over My Dead Body (Nur über meine Leiche)	Rainer Matsutani	Germany
1998	Photographing Fairies (Photographing Fairies)	Nick Willing	United Kingdom
1999	Cube	Vincenzo Natali	Canada
2000	The Nameless (Los sin nombre)	Jaume Balagueró	Spain
2001	Tales of the Unusual (世にも奇妙な物語 映画の特別編, Yonimo kimyō na monogatari: Eiga no tokubetsu hen)	Mamoru Hosi, Masayuki Ochiai, Hisao Ogura, Masayuki Suzuki	Japan
2002	The Devil's Backbone (El espinazo del diablo)	Guillermo del Toro	Spain, Mexico
2003	Dark Water (仄暗い水の底から, Honogurai mizu no soko kara)	Hideo Nakata	Japan
2004	Love Object	Robert Parigi	United States
2005	Calvaire	Fabrice Du Welz	Belgium, France, Luxembourg
2006	Isolation	Billy O'Brien	United Kingdom, Ireland, United States
2007	The Bothersome Man (Den brysomme mannen)	Jens Lien	Norway
2008	Diary of the Dead	George A. Romero	United States
2009	Let the Right One In (Låt den rätte komma in)	Tomas Alfredson	Sweden
2010	Moon	Duncan Jones	United Kingdom
2011	I Saw the Devil (악마를 보았다; Akmareul boatda)	Kim Jee-woon	South Korea
2012	Babycall	Pål Sletaune	Norway, Germany, Sweden
2013	Berberian Sound Studio	Peter Strickland	United Kingdom
2014	The Babadook	Jennifer Kent	Australia
2015	It Follows	David Robert Mitchell	United States
2016	Evolution	Lucile Hadžihalilović	France, Spain, Belgium
2017	Raw	Julia Ducournau	France, Belgium
2018	Good Manners (As Boas Maneiras)	Marco Dutra, Juliana Rojas	Brazil, France
2019	The Unthinkable (Den blomstertid nu kommer)	Victor Danell / Crazy Pictures	Sweden
2020	Prize not awarded	-	-
2021	The Swarm	Just Philippot	France
2022	The Innocents (De uskyldige)	Eskil Vogt	Norway, Sweden, Denmark, Finland, France, United Kingdom
2023	The Mountain	Thomas Salvador	France
2024	When Evil Lurks	Demián Rugna	Argentina
2025	The Wailing	Pedro Martín-Calero	Spain, Argentina, France
2026	Cadet	Adilkhan Yerzhanov	Kazakhstan

== Public Prize ==
Year	Title of film	Director	Nationality
2003	2009: Lost Memories	Lee Si-myung	South Korea
2006	Fragile	Jaume Balagueró	Spain
2007	Black Sheep	Jonathan King	New Zealand
2008	REC	Jaume Balagueró et Paco Plaza	Spain
2009	The Midnight Meat Train	Ryuhei Kitamura	United States
2010	5150 Elm's Way	Éric Tessier	Canada
2011	I Saw the Devil	Kim Jee-woon	South Korea
2012	Eva	Kike Maillo	Spain
2013	Mama	Andres Muschietti	Canada, Spain
2014	The Babadook	Jennifer Kent	Australia
2015	The Voices	Marjane Satrapi	Germany, United States
2016	The Devil's Candy	Sean Byrne	United States
2017	The Girl with All the Gifts	Colm McCarthy	United Kingdom
2018	Incident in a Ghost Land	Pascal Laugier	Canada, France
2019	Puppet Master: The Littlest Reich	Sonny Laguna and Tommy Wiklund	United States
2020	1BR	David Marmor	United States
2021	La Nuée	Just Philippot	France
2022	The Innocents (De uskyldige)	Eskil Vogt	Norway, Sweden, Denmark, Finland, France, United Kingdom
2023	La Pietà	Eduardo Casanova	Spain, Argentina
2024	When Evil Lurks	Demián Rugna	Argentina
2025	Oddity	Damian Mc Carthy	Ireland, United States
2026	Redux Redux	Kevin McManus and Matthew McManus	United States

== Fantastic Novel Prize ==
Year	Title	Author	Nationality
1995	Le Chien qui rit	Anne Dugüel	Belgium
1996	La Mécanique des ombres	Benjamin Legrand	France
1997	La Qualité du silence	Max Dorra	France
1998	Les Mères Noires	Pascal Françaix	France
1999	La Maison Usher ne chutera pas	Pierre Stolze	France
2000	Les Mémoires de l'Homme-Éléphant	Xavier Mauméjean	France
2001	Le Templier	François Angelier	France
2002	Wonderlandz	Jean-Luc Bizien	France
2003	Le Cinquième Règne	Maxime Chattam	France

== See also ==
- List of fantastic and horror film festivals
