= Rec 3: Genesis =

2012 film by Paco Plaza

- Theatrical release poster
- Directed by: Paco Plaza
- Screenplay by: Luiso Berdejo; Paco Plaza
- Story by: Luiso Berdejo; Paco Plaza; David Gallart
- Based on: Characters by; Jaume Balagueró; Paco Plaza
- Produced by: Julio Fernández
- Starring: Leticia Dolera; Diego Martín; Ismael Martínez; Àlex Monner; Sr. B; Emilio Mencheta
- Cinematography: Pablo Rosso
- Edited by: David Gallart
- Music by: Mikel Salas
- Production companies: Canal+ España; Filmax
- Distributed by: Filmax international
- Release date: 30 March 2012
- Running time: 81 minutes
- Country: Spain
- Language: Spanish
- Budget: €5 million; US$6.4 million
- Box office: $10.1 million

Rec 3: Genesis (stylized as [•REC]³: Genesis) is a 2012 Spanish action horror film directed and co-written by Paco Plaza. The film, which is the third installment in the Rec series, eschews the found-footage format of its predecessors and occurs concurrently as the first film. Rec 3: Genesis follows two newlyweds (played by Diego Martín and Leticia Dolera) who struggle to reunite with each other after the viral zombie outbreak ruins their wedding reception and infects their families.

Rec 3: Genesis was released in Spain on 30 March 2012. with more international premiere dates that followed. The world premiere took place in Paris at the Grand Rex on 7 March, followed by midnight screenings at the South By Southwest Film Festival on 9 March. In the U.S., it was released via video on demand on 3 August and was released theatrically on 7 September 2012 in select cities. Sony Entertainment released the DVD on 6 November 2012. The film was followed by a fourth installment, Rec 4: Apocalypse, in October 2014.

== Plot ==
Koldo and Clara are about to celebrate their wedding day and have gathered their friends and family in a sumptuous country house for the occasion. That evening, a veterinarian recently bitten by a dog develops abnormal behavior and becomes aggressive. In a few moments, an uncontrollable wave of violence sweeps over the party as an increasing number of guests are infected as a result of bites. Clara and Koldo are separated amidst the chaos. Koldo finds refuge in the kitchen with his cousin Adrián, Clara's sister Tita, the wedding photographer Atun and a copyright inspector nicknamed "Royalties". They escape through the air-conditioning ducts, apart from Atun due to his size. Outside, the group finds a police vehicle and a guest eating the policeman's flesh. After killing her, they try to contact the police, but Royalties is devoured by the now-infected policeman. The vehicle's sirens are triggered and alert the infected. The group escapes and joins other survivors within a chapel, which the infected cannot enter. Through the P.A. system, Koldo hears Clara say that she is safe as well as pregnant, and he decides to find her.

Clara and the wedding priest have found refuge in the video surveillance room and are helplessly watching the carnage unfold. Spotted by the infected, they escape and find Rafa, a friend of the couple, and Natalie, Clara's French friend who had retired to a room for sexual intercourse without realizing the situation. Clara, Rafa and Natalie flee while the priest immobilizes the infected by reciting a prayer. Meanwhile, Koldo arrives at the surveillance room and witnesses the massacre of Adrian, Tita, his grandmother, and others as they get cornered and eaten by the infected. Clara, Natalie and Rafa meet another survivor, children's entertainer "Sponge John". Natalie is bitten and Clara faces her infected mother. John shoots the mother before he himself is bitten. Clara and Rafa flee through a tunnel, but Clara turns around when she hears a song played by Koldo in the ballroom.

Clara, followed by Rafa, takes a chainsaw and fights her way through the infected, but Rafa is bitten and Clara is forced to kill him. Koldo enters the kitchen to find a dead Atun, having slit his wrists to prevent infection, and killing the Vet with a kitchen tool. Clara finds Koldo in the kitchen and both are surrounded by a horde of infected, which are suddenly paralyzed by the voice of the priest reciting scripture over the P.A. system. Clara and Koldo go out into the garden, where Clara is bitten by Koldo’s infected grandfather, whose deafness renders him immune to the prayer. Koldo cuts Clara's arm just below the elbow to stop the infection and they arrive at the estate's exit, where they discover that the authorities have quarantined the area. The attempt to stop Clara's infection fails and she begins to show signs of turning. Koldo takes her outside where the police and a GEO team tell him to let her go. Clara and Koldo share a final kiss before Clara, now fully turned, bites his tongue off and then turns to attack the armed men who shoot both of them down. Clara and Koldo hold each other's hands as they die from their gun wounds.

== Cast ==
- Leticia Dolera as Clara
- Diego Martín as Koldo
- Ismael Martínez as Rafa
- Àlex Monner as Adrián
- Claire Baschet as Natalie
- Jana Soler as Tita
- Sr. B as Atún
- Emilio Mencheta as Tio Pepe Victor
- David Ramírez as Royalties
- Miguel Ángel González as Sponge John
- Xavier Ruano as Priest
- Itziar Castro as Señora con Pamela
- Rosa Chevalier as Tia Amparo
- Javier Botet as Niña Medeiros
- Carme Contreras i Verdiales as Amelia
- Mireia Ros as Menchu
- Carla Nieto as Rebeca Viñas
- Ana Isabel Velásquez as Wendy
- Blai Llopis as Quiquín
- Paco Moreno as Charly
- Antonio Barroso as Pequeñín
- Charlotte Vega as Bridesmaid #2

== Production ==
In May 2010, it was announced Filmax had greenlit two new [REC] films consisting of Rec 3: Genesis and Rec 4: Apocalypse. In contrast to the previous movies, Jaume Balagueró and Paco Plaza did not co-direct the new installments with Plaza directing Rec 3: Genesis while Balagueró would direct Rec 4: Apocalypse.

The shooting began on 4th April 2011 and ended on 20th May 2011. Post-production began on 23rd May 2011. The shooting lasted for seven weeks in Barcelona. A teaser trailer premiered in September, while a theatrical trailer was released in December.

== Release ==
REC 3: Génesis was released in theatres 30th March 2012 in Spain. It was released on DVD in August 2012. The US release date was 3rd August 2012 via On Demand services with a 7th September 2012 theatrical release date that followed. It was released on DVD in the US on 6th November 2012.

== Reception ==
On review aggregator Rotten Tomatoes it has a 40% score based on 47 reviews, with an average rating of 5.24/10. The site's critics consensus reads, "[REC] 3 Genesis discards the handheld POV of its predecessors and loses the franchise's fresh perspective in the bargain, upping the gags and gore to the detriment of the chills that audiences crave." On Metacritic.com it has a weighted average score of 45 out of 100 based on 11 critics, indicating "mixed or average" reviews.

V. A. Musetto of the New York Post said the film was enjoyable to watch, giving it 4 out of 5 stars. It received a negative review from Slant Magazine's Ed Gonzalez, who said that "if a fourth entry wasn't already in the works, [Rec] 3: Genesis could have easily represented the nail in the franchise's coffin."

== Comic ==
A comic book compilation was released in 2012 to accompany the release of REC 3, titled REC: Historias Ineditas. The book presents five story arcs set in the REC series, illustrated by five artists.

1. The first, ENCERRADOS (Trapped) follows the Teenagers trapped in the Apartment, following Tito's possession. They're released and taunted by Tito. Before they can escape however, they are shot down by a new group of GEO's who have come to rescue Angela.
2. The second TRISTANA, provides the backstory for Tristana Medeiros, who becomes the possessed after being raped.
3. The Third, ZOOMBII, deals with an infected man making his way to a Zoo, where he infects the animals.
4. The fourth titled EL EXPERIMENTO (The Experiment), follows the priest, Padre Albelda, (the dead priest from the second film and the man heard on the voice recording at the end of the first installment) attempting to end the Medeiros Girl's life in the apartment.
5. The Final Arc follows the Infected Uncle from the third film and reveals what happened to Max (the infected dog from the first film).

== Sequel ==
A fourth film titled REC 4: Apocalypse, was released 31 October 2014, with Manuela Velasco reprising her role as Ángela Vidal, the reporter from the first two films. The film follows the events of the second film, and loses the "found-footage" style. Jaume Balagueró stated that the film doesn't have an apocalyptic style presumed by its title, saying that "all of the movies in the [REC] series have the same budget, so you're not really going to see big scenes of Barcelona full of zombies; they're just not intended that way. There has to be a story that's controlled and strong".
