= Sin Nombre =

Sin Nombre (Spanish for 'without name') may refer to:

- A placeholder name in Spanish
- Sin Nombre orthohantavirus, a virus
- Sin nombre (film), a 2009 film by Cary Joji Fukunaga
- The Nameless (film), a 1999 film also known in Spanish as Los Sin Nombre
