= Rec 2 =

2009 film by Jaume Balagueró and Paco Plaza

- Theatrical release poster
- Directed by: Jaume Balagueró; Paco Plaza
- Written by: Jaume Balagueró; Paco Plaza; Manu Díez
- Based on: Characters by Jaume Balaguero; Paco Plaza
- Produced by: Julio Fernández; Carlos Fernández
- Starring: Manuela Velasco; Jonathan Mellor; Oscar Sánchez Zafra; Ariel Casas; Alejandro Casaseca; Pablo Rosso; Claudia Silva
- Cinematography: Pablo Rosso
- Edited by: David Gallart
- Production companies: Filmax; Castelao Productions
- Distributed by: Filmax
- Release date: 2 October 2009
- Running time: 85 minutes
- Country: Spain
- Language: Spanish
- Budget: $5.6 million
- Box office: $18.5 million

Rec 2 (stylized as [•REC]²) is a 2009 Spanish found footage action-horror film directed by Jaume Balagueró and Paco Plaza. It is a sequel to the 2007 film Rec and the second installment of the Rec film series. The story takes place immediately after the events of the first film and follows a team of soldiers assigned to protect a scientist supposedly sent to investigate the cause of the outbreak, but who clearly knows more about it than he claims.

Several actors from the first film reprise their roles, mostly briefly appearing as infected versions of their characters. The film was followed by Rec 3: Genesis - the events of which take place concurrently with Rec and Rec 2 - and later by Rec 4: Apocalypse.

== Plot ==
Dr. Owen, an official from the Ministry of Health, and a heavily armed GEO team of four (Fernandez, Martos, Rosso and Larra) equipped with video cameras and body cams are sent into a quarantined apartment building to find out what happened to its inhabitants, who have been rendered violent by a contagious virus. (Note: As depicted in Rec. (2007)) They ascend to the attic and find it unoccupied. They return to a lower level to investigate a disturbance and are attacked by infected residents.

Martos is infected; Owen uses religious mantra and a rosary to hold him off in a room. He reveals that he is actually a priest sent by the Vatican to get a blood sample from a possessed girl named Tristana Medeiros, the root of the infection. The GEO operators search the apartment where Medeiros was held and discover the body of Father Albelda, the original priest charged with the case of Medeiros's possession. They find a sample of Medeiros's blood taken by Albelda, but lose it. Owen tells them that the only way to accomplish the mission is to get a blood sample from Tristana herself. They are attacked by a group of infected and Larra, cornered, commits suicide.

The father of an infected girl Jennifer persuades a firefighter to help him enter the building through the sewers. They are unknowingly followed by teenagers Tito, Mire and Ori, as the police seal their exit. Jennifer's father is infected and killed by the GEO team while the firefighter is killed accidentally by Mire, who kills Martos too. After Tito is infected, the crew locks Mire and Ori in a room and encounter reporter Ángela Vidal (Manuela Velasco), shocked but safe despite being attacked by Tristana at the end of the previous film. The group questions the possessed Tito and deduce from his cryptic answers that Medeiros is in the penthouse and certain areas are only accessible in total darkness and infrared light.

The group finds a hidden door using the night vision on Ángela's camera. They are attacked by Medeiros who kills Fernandez and attacks Owen before Ángela blows her head off with a shotgun. Owen is enraged because he needed the blood sample and refuses to authorize their exit. Angered, Ángela attacks him and kills Rosso when he attempts an intervention. It is revealed that the demon possessing Tristana has now possessed Ángela.

Ángela kills Owen and imitates his voice to contact the authorities. She tells them that the mission has been accomplished, that Owen must stay inside due to being infected, and that the only survivor allowed to leave is Ángela. A flashback reveals what happened right before the film's beginning: Ángela was captured by Medeiros and had a vermiform organism orally transmitted into her. As the response team arrived, she went into hiding.

== Cast ==
- Manuela Velasco as Ángela Vidal
- Jonathan Mellor as Dr. Owen
- Javier Botet as Tristana Medeiros
- Oscar Sánchez Zafra as Chief Fernández
- Ariel Casas as Larra
- Alejandro Casaseca as Martos
- Pablo Rosso as Rosso
- Claudia Silva as Jennifer
- Pau Poch as Tito
- Andrea Ros as Mire
- Àlex Batllori as Ori
- Juli Fàbregas as Fireman Jose
- Pep Molina as Jennifer's Father

== Production ==
Following the success of Rec, Jaume Balagueró and Paco Plaza signed on for a sequel. Principal photography began on 10 November 2008 and wrapped in December 2008. The film reunites the directors with many of the original cast and crew members of the previous film. It was shot in Barcelona over six weeks.

== Release ==
The film premiered at the 66th Venice International Film Festival, out of competition. It was also shown at the Midnight Madness portion of the 2009 Toronto International Film Festival, as well as the 2009 Fantastic Fest in Austin, Texas, and the 2009 Sitges Film Festival. It went on general release in Spain the first weekend of October, going to No. 1 in the Spanish box office and achieving the best opening weekend of the year for a Spanish film.

Rec 2 was released in New Zealand theaters by Vendetta Films on 13 November 2009. The marketing budget for the film, NZ$7500, was used to create a website, where the remaining $5000 marketing budget would be given away to the member of the public who was judged responsible for the most good publicity generated for the release of the film. Sony Pictures Home Entertainment will release the film on DVD in October 2010. In March 2010 Magnolia Pictures acquired the rights for the US market and will screen the film in a theatrical release in July 2010. The distributor Magnolia pictures will screen the film on Video on Demand platforms on 4 June 2010 and released the film only on DVD. Magnolia has the film set with a release on 9 July 2010 and released on 30 March 2010 the UK trailer.

The film was released on 28 May 2010 in the UK. It is part of the Terror in the Aisles 4 at the Portage Theater in Chicago, Illinois.

== Reception ==
Rec 2 received generally positive reviews. On Rotten Tomatoes, the film has a 68% rating based on 72 reviews, with an average rating of 6.21/10. The site's consensus states: "It lacks the surprising jolt of the first installment, but [REC] 2 almost maintains the original's chilling momentum – and proves not all horror sequels were made equal". Metacritic, which uses a weighted average, assigned the film a score of 52 out of 100, based on 13 critics, indicating "mixed or average" reviews.

Reviewing the film in The New York Times, Jeannette Catsoulis praised the sound design and the directing, but criticised the sequel's lack of terror found in the original film, and its anti-Catholic sentiment and repetitive staging.

Little White Lies gave the film 4/5 and called it "The greatest zombie sequel since Dawn of the Dead". Empire also awarded the film 4 stars, saying: "Here’s a horror juddering with such in-your-face malevolent energy, it’s like being caught in a first-person shooter possessed by the devil".

The Daily Mirror awarded the film 2 stars, and reviewer David Edwards stated it was "a bit of a W[rec]k."

== Sequels ==
On 3 May 2010, Bloody Disgusting announced that "...Filmax will produce two new [REC] films in the next couple of years called [REC] 3: Genesis and [REC] 4 with the same directors as the first two films." Genesis was released on 30 March 2012, and centers on an outbreak in a distant location from the original apartment building, also having prequel elements. [REC] 4 ended the saga with the infection spreading on a ship. The movie was released 31 October 2014 .

== See also ==
- List of Spanish films of 2009
