= Manuela Velasco =

Spanish actress and TV personality (born 1975)

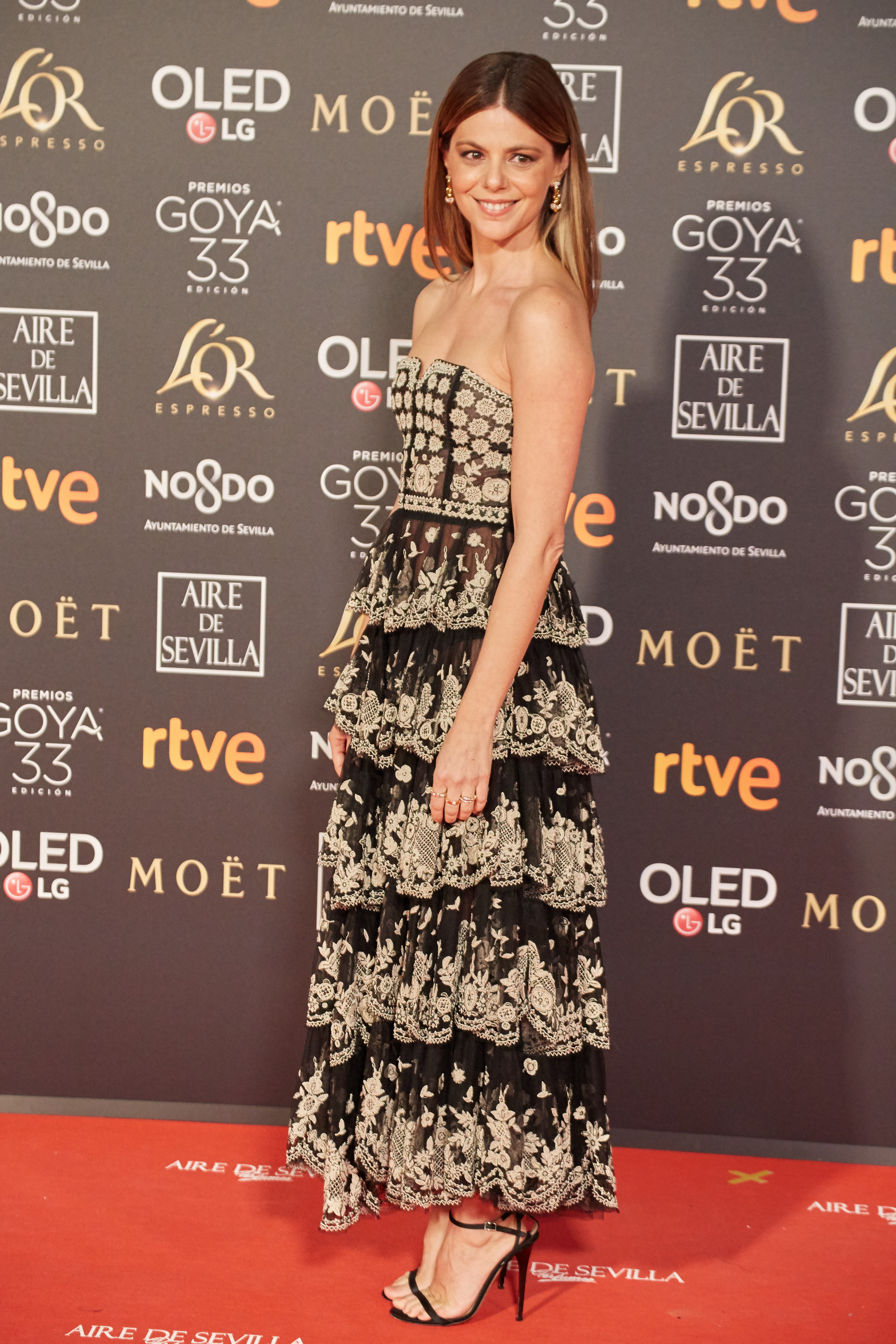
- Velasco at the Goya Awards in 2019
- Born: Manuela Velasco Díez; 23 October 1975 (age 51); Madrid, Spain
- Occupations: Actress; television personality
- Years active: 1983–present
- Relatives: Concha Velasco (aunt)

Manuela Velasco Díez (born 23 October 1975) is a Spanish actress and television personality. She is known for starring in the horror franchise REC (2007–2014), for which she won the Goya Award for Best New Actress in 2008.

== Career ==
Velasco's first film role was in 1987, as pre-teen Ada in Pedro Almodóvar's comedy-drama thriller Law of Desire.

She played TV-reporter Ángela Vidal in the found footage horror films REC, REC 2 and REC 4: Apocalypse. She won the Goya Award for Best New Actress for her performance in REC.

In 2005, she hosted Cuatrosfera, by Cuatro.

In 2009, she starred in La chica de ayer, a Spanish adaptation of the UK science fiction series Life on Mars. In 2010, she portrayed Eugenia de Molina, the duchess of Monfragüe in Águila Roja, by TVE.

In 2011, Velasco appeared in the TV series Ángel o demonio. In 2012, she portrayed Ainhoa in Aída.

From 2014 to 2016, Velasco played Cristina Otegui in the TV-series Velvet.

In 2016, she played in a theatrical adaptation of the 1994 film Todo es mentira.

In 2017 she appeared in the stage play Bajo terapia alongside Gorka Otxoa, Fele Martínez and Melani Olivares.

== Filmography ==
=== Television ===
Year	Title	Character	Channel	Notes
1983	Los desastres de la guerra	Girl with Víctor Hugo	TVE	
1996	Éste es mi barrio		Antena 3	1 episode
1998	A las once en casa		La 1	1 episode
1998	Médico de familia		Telecinco	1 episode
1999	Camino de Santiago		Antena 3	3 episodes
1999	El comisario	Carola	Telecinco	1 episode
2000	Hospital Central	Eva	Telecinco	1 episode
2000	Policías, en el corazón de la calle	Sergio's girlfriend	Antena 3	1 episode
2000	El grupo		Telecinco	1 episode
2000	Un chupete para ella	Alba	Antena 3	2 episodes
2001	Manos a la obra		Antena 3	1 episode
2002	Sant'Antonio di Padova			TV movie
2002–03	Géminis, venganza de amor	Beatriz Torres	La 1	23 episodes
2003–05	Cuéntame cómo pasó	Lourdes	La 1	2 episodes
2007	El síndrome de Ulises		Antena 3	1 episode
2007–08	Hienas	Ana	Web series	
2009	Doctor Mateo	Julia Muñiz	Antena 3	7 episodes
2009	La chica de ayer	Ana Valverde	Antena 3	8 episodes
2009	Amazing Mask	Reporter Perdita González	Web series	
2010–11	Águila Roja	Eugenia de Molina	La 1	7 episodes
2011	Ángel o demonio	Sandra Alcocer	Telecinco	1 episode
2012–14	Aída	Ainhoa Díaz Serrano	Telecinco	34 episodes
2014–16	Velvet	Cristina Otegui	Antena 3	55 episodes
2017–18	Traición	Isabel Fuentes del Riego	La 1	9 episodes
2018	Velvet Colección	Cristina Otegui	#0	6 episodes
2020	Mentiras	Catalina Munar	Antena 3	6 episodes
2020–2024	Amar es para siempre	Maica Vélez	Antena 3	

=== Film ===
Year	Movie	Character	Director
1987	Law of Desire	Ada	Pedro Almodóvar
1988	El juego más divertido	Ada	Emilio Martínez-Lázaro
2001	Comunicación	Friend	Enrique Andrés
2001	School Killer	Patricia	Carlos Gil
2001	Gente pez		Jorge Iglesias
2003	Atraco a las 3... y media		Raúl Marchand Sánchez
2006	El Ratón Pérez		Juan Pablo Buscarini
2007	El club de los suicidas	Andrea	Roberto Santiago
2007	REC	Ángela Vidal	Jaume Balagueró and Paco Plaza
2008	Sangre de Mayo		José Luis Garci
2009	REC 2	Ángela Vidal	Jaume Balagueró and Paco Plaza
2009	El Ratón Pérez 2	Reporter	Andrés G. Schaer
2011	Amigos...	Miranda	Borja Manso and Marcos Cabotá
2012	Holmes & Watson. Madrid Days	Elena	José Luis Garci
2014	Rec 4: Apocalypse	Ángela Vidal	Jaume Balagueró and Fernando Izquierdo
2015	Cuento de verano	Girl	Carlos Dorrego
2019	Antes de la quema	Rosario	Fernando Colomo

=== Television-host ===
Year	Program	Channel
1999–2000	Local de música	Localia Televisión
2000–05	Los 40	Canal+
2003–05	Del 40 al 1	Canal+
2005–07	Cuatrosfera	Cuatro
2007–08	Brainiac	Cuatro
2010	La noche de los Oscar	Canal+
2012	La noche de los Oscar	Canal+

=== Theater ===
Year	Title	Character	Theater
2010	Todos eran mis hijos	Ann Deever	Teatro Español
2013	Feelgood		
2015–17	Bajo terapia	Carla	Teatros del Canal and Teatro Marquina
2017	Alma de Dios		Teatro de la Zarzuela
2018	El Banquete		Teatro de la Comedia
2019	Ricardo III		Teatro Español

== Awards and nominations ==
Year	Award	Category	Work	Result
2007	Sitges Film Festival	Best Actress	•REC	Won
2007	Cinematographic Writers Circle Medals	Best New Actress	•REC	Nominated
2007	Union of Actors and Actresses Awards	Best New Actress	•REC	Nominated
2008	Goya Awards	Best New Actress	•REC	Won
2010	Fotogramas de Plata Awards	Best Theater Actress	Todos eran mis hijos	Nominated
