= Dimension Films =

American film production and distribution label

- Type: Label
- Industry: Film
- Predecessor: Millimeter Films
- Founded: 1992; 34 years ago
- Founder: Bob Weinstein
- Defunct: September 17, 2019; 7 years ago
- Fate: Bankruptcy
- Successors: Library: Paramount Pictures (under Miramax) (pre-2005, with some exceptions); Lionsgate and Spyglass Media Group (post-2005, with some exceptions)
- Headquarters: New York City, New York, U.S.
- Area served: Worldwide
- Key people: Bob Weinstein (chairman); Robert Katz (president)
- Products: Motion pictures
- Parent: Miramax Films (1992–2005); The Weinstein Company (2005–2018); Lantern Entertainment (2018-2019)
- Divisions: Dimension Home Entertainment; Dimension Extreme; Dimension Television

Dimension Films was an American independent film production and distribution label founded in 1992. Formally a brand of one of the American "mini-majors" The Weinstein Company (i.e., small to medium independent television and motion picture production studios), Dimension Films produced and released independent films and genre titles, specifically horror and science fiction films.

Dimension Films was used as Harvey and Bob Weinstein's label within the brothers' own Miramax Films studio, which was acquired by The Walt Disney Company on June 30, 1993. The Weinsteins took the Dimension Films label with them when they separated from Miramax Films on October 1, 2005, and paired it under their new company, The Weinstein Company (TWC). The firing of Harvey Weinstein following allegations of sexual harassment and rape against him, however, as well as financial troubles that followed, led to TWC's decline. TWC eventually declared bankruptcy in February 2018, with Lantern Entertainment acquiring a majority of its film library and assets, and was shut down on July 16 of the same year.

All films released by Dimension Films before 2005 (as part of Miramax) are currently owned and distributed by Paramount Pictures.

== History ==
=== 1992: Foundation and early releases ===
Dimension Films was officially founded in 1992 under its parent company Miramax Films by Bob Weinstein as a label to distribute horror films and other films deemed "disreputable" for release under the Miramax Films title. The Weinsteins had released similar titles under a smaller operation called Millimeter Films from 1988 to 1992.

The first release under the Dimension Films label was the sequel film Hellraiser III: Hell on Earth, released theatrically in the United States in 1992, followed by Stuart Gordon's sci-fi thriller Fortress, and the sequel Children of the Corn II: The Final Sacrifice, both released the same year.

=== 1993–1999: Disney's acquisition of Miramax ===
On June 30, 1993, The Walt Disney Company purchased Miramax Films, who had been facing financial troubles between 1990 and 1992, prior to their acquisition and release of The Crying Game, which earned the company US$60 million. The success of The Crying Game made Miramax Films attractive to Disney, who officially bought the company in 1993, resulting in Dimension Films becoming a Disney subsidiary.

After the box-office failure of Mother's Boys (1994) starring Jamie Lee Curtis, Dimension Films distributed Miramax Films' The Crow (1994), which would garner Dimension Films its first major commercial success. In 1995, Dimension Films acquired the rights to the Halloween film series, releasing the sixth installment Halloween: The Curse of Michael Myers in September that year. The release of From Dusk till Dawn (1996) would mark the beginning of a working relationship with director Robert Rodriguez as well as a lucrative franchise, with several sequels to follow.

Dimension Films would gain greater exposure with its distribution of Wes Craven's Scream, released on December 20, 1996, which became a major box office hit, grossing $173 million worldwide. The company also produced and distributed its sequel, Scream 2, released the following year, which grossed a comparable $172 million.

Dimension Films continued its trend of releasing horror and science fiction films, specifically films aimed at teenagers and young adult audiences, with the releases of Phantoms (1998) and the Halloween sequel Halloween H20: 20 Years Later (1998), the latter of which garnered the company another commercial success. The company released its second film with director Robert Rodriguez, the teen sci-fi film The Faculty, on Christmas Day 1998. In 1999, Dimension Films distributed David Cronenberg's eXistenZ and Scream-writer Kevin Williamson's directorial debut Teaching Mrs. Tingle.

=== 2000–2004: Post-millennium releases ===
Dimension Films' first post-millennium release was the direct-to-video From Dusk Till Dawn 3: The Hangman's Daughter. Next was Scream 3 (2000), which was theatrically released like its predecessors. In July 2000, the company released the slasher parody film Scary Movie, which grossed a record-breaking $278 million for the company and marked the beginning of another popular film series. 2001 saw the release of the Robert Rodriguez-directed Spy Kids, which was the company's first major children's film. The film would spawn another popular franchise for the company.

Beginning in 2000, Dimension Films began purchasing North American distribution rights to various international productions. Their 2001 release of The Others, a Spanish-produced supernatural thriller starring Nicole Kidman, was a surprise success for the company. Other international productions purchased by Dimension Films included two additional horror films by Spanish director Jaume Balagueró: The Nameless (1999), and Darkness (2002). Darkness received a North American theatrical release in December 2004 after being shelved for two years, and proved to be a financial success, while The Nameless was released direct-to-video in 2005. In January 2005, Dimension Films purchased the American distribution rights to the Australian horror film Wolf Creek, which was released in December that year.

For much of the early 2000s, Dimension Films produced and distributed numerous sequels to films released under their branch, including several direct-to-video releases for films such as Children of the Corn: Revelation (2001), Hellraiser: Hellseeker (2002), and Dracula III: Legacy (2005). They also distributed several comedies, such as the Terry Zwigoff-directed Bad Santa (2003), and David Zucker's My Boss's Daughter (2003).

=== 2005–2018: Separation from Miramax ===
In 2005, the Weinstein brothers purchased the rights to Dimension Films from Disney, and Dimension Films officially became a subsidiary of The Weinstein Company (TWC), established the same year.

After its separation from Miramax Films, Dimension Films would co-produce several titles with Metro-Goldwyn-Mayer (MGM), including the horror remakes The Amityville Horror (2005), Black Christmas (2006), and Halloween (2007), as well as the Stephen King-based thrillers 1408 and The Mist (both 2007). In the spring of 2007, Dimension Films produced and distributed the joint-double feature film Grindhouse, directed by Robert Rodriguez and Quentin Tarantino. The film was a major box office failure, grossing less than half of its $53 million budget.

In 2011, Scream 4, the fourth installment in the Scream series, was released and proved to be another box office success in the franchise, earning nearly $100 million in box office receipts. The company released the sci-fi horror films Apollo 18 (2011) and Dark Skies (2013). In 2013, Dimension Films acquired the rights to the independent slasher film All the Boys Love Mandy Lane, shot in 2006, and gave the film a limited release in the United States in October.

Dimension partnered with MTV for the television series Scream, based on the film series. On June 24, 2019, it was announced that Scream would be moving to VH1 ahead of the third season, which Dimension did not produce. Dimension Films also had involvement with One Ball Pictures, who owns the "Funny Or Die" online series. They released their first episode, "A Lesson with John McEnroe", with Dimension Films.

In 2015, Dimension Films lost the rights to the Halloween franchise.

=== Bankruptcy ===
In 2018, TWC was purchased in a bankruptcy auction by Lantern Entertainment.

On December 20, 2019, ViacomCBS (now known as Skydance Corporation) announced that they would acquire 49% of Miramax from beIN Media Group for at least $375 million, with Paramount Pictures gaining exclusive worldwide distribution rights to the Miramax library, including the pre-2005 Dimension films. ViacomCBS and Miramax will also co-produce new content based on titles from the Miramax library. The deal closed on April 3, 2020.

== Home media ==
The pre-2005 Dimension films were originally released to home video through Buena Vista Home Entertainment and marketed under the Dimension Home Video label (under the Hollywood Pictures Home Entertainment label in some places), while Miramax was owned by Disney. After Disney sold Miramax to Filmyard in 2010, they were distributed from 2011 to 2020 on home video through Lionsgate Home Entertainment, with Echo Bridge Home Entertainment briefly handling some as well. Through ViacomCBS (now Skydance Corporation)'s 49% stake in Miramax, Paramount Home Entertainment acquired the home video distribution rights to the pre-2005 Dimension titles. Notable exceptions are The Others (2001), Mr. 3000 (2004), and The Amityville Horror (2005).

As of 2024, the post-2005 Dimension Films titles are currently released on DVD and Blu-ray by Lionsgate. Before, they were distributed by Genius Products and Sony Pictures Home Entertainment.

=== Dimension Extreme ===
Beginning in 2008, Dimension introduced the Dimension Extreme label, which released primarily international indie horror and teen film/adult comedy (i.e., "Extreme Movie") titles on DVD.

== Filmography ==
=== Primary owners and distributors ===
==== Past owners and distributors ====
- Miramax Films
  (1992–2010 for films released before late 2005, under Buena Vista Pictures ownership from 1993 to 2010)
- The Weinstein Company
  (2005–2018 for films released from late 2005 to 2019)
  - Metro-Goldwyn-Mayer (2006–2008)
  - Genius Products (2006–2009)
  - Vivendi Entertainment (2009–2010)
  - Sony Pictures (2010–2011)
  - Anchor Bay Entertainment (2011–2017)
- Lionsgate and Echo Bridge Home Entertainment
  (2011–2014 for films released before late 2005 via Miramax through separate deals, Lionsgate gained Echo Bridge titles and released them from 2014 to 2020, Lionsgate also distributed films released from late 2005 to 2019 via The Weinstein Company through its acquisition of Anchor Bay's parent company Starz Inc.)

==== Current owners and distributors ====
- Paramount Pictures
  (via Miramax ownership since 2020 for films released before late 2005)
- Lantern Entertainment, Lionsgate and Studio Distribution Services (Conectiv Supply Chain Solutions)
  (via Spyglass Media Group ownership since 2021 for films released from late 2005 to 2019, film catalog acquired by Lantern in 2018, then transferred to Spyglass in 2019, partial stakes in Spyglass acquired by Warner and Lionsgate in 2019 and 2021, respectively. Lionsgate later acquired Entertainment One (eOne), which included the assets of former Alliance Atlantis division Alliance Films in 2023)
  - Sony Pictures Home Entertainment
  - RLJE Films
  - Shout! Factory

== See also ==
- Screen Gems, a subsidiary of Sony Pictures that similarly specializes in genre films.

== Works cited ==
- Lázaro-Reboll, Antonio (2014). Spanish Horror Film. University of Edinburgh Press. ISBN 978-0-748-63639-6.
- Perren, Alisa (2012). Indie, Inc.: Miramax and the Transformation of Hollywood in the 1990s. University of Texas Press. ISBN 978-0-292-74287-1.
