= Javier Botet =

Spanish actor (born 1977)

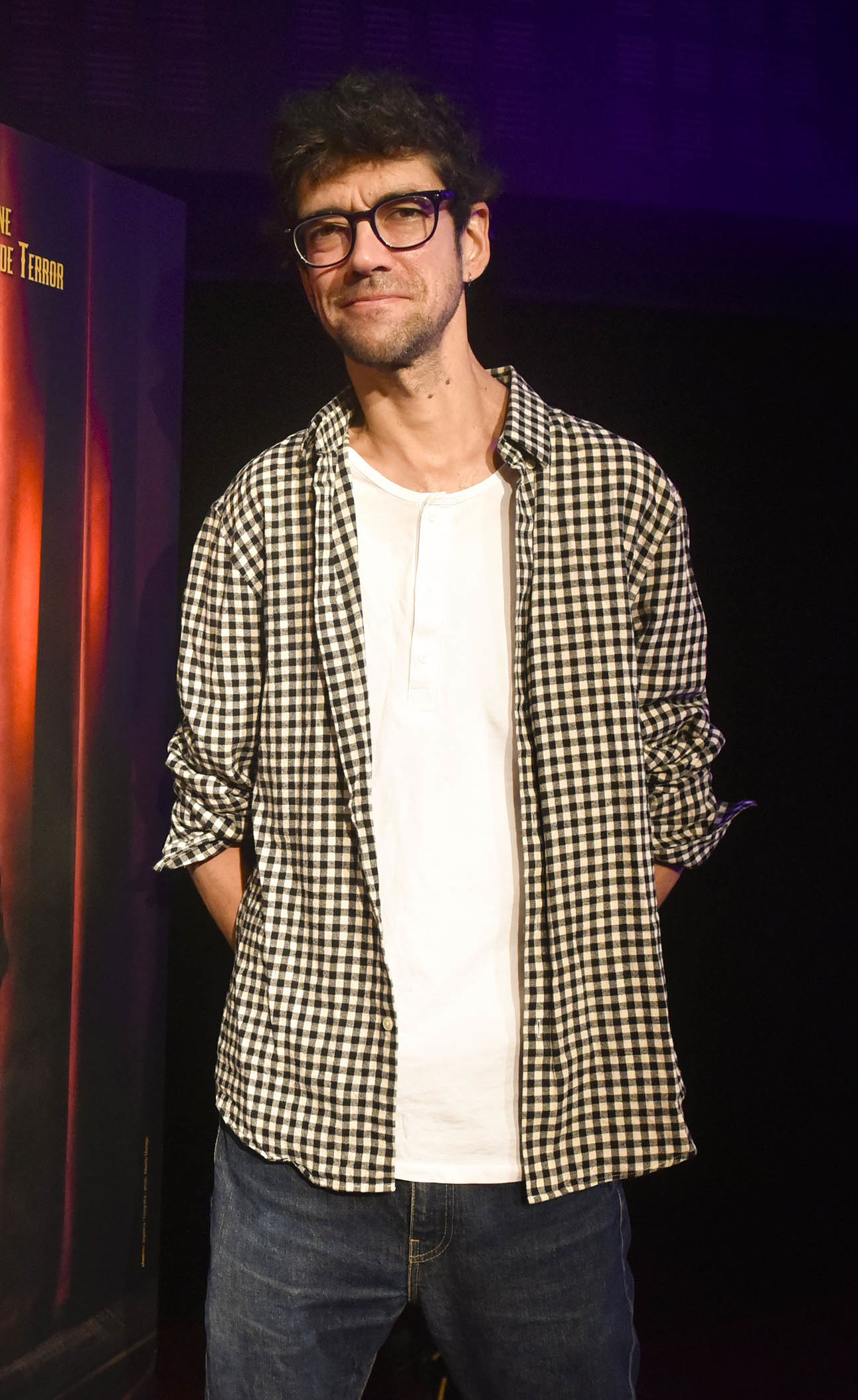
- Botet at the San Sebastián Horror and Fantasy Film Week in 2020
- Born: Javier Botet López; 30 July 1977 (age 49); Ciudad Real, Spain
- Occupation: Actor
- Years active: 2005–present
- Height: 6 ft 7 in (201 cm)

Javier Botet López (born 30 July 1977) is a Spanish actor, best known as a creature actor using his tall, thin build and long fingers resulting from Marfan syndrome. Although he originally worked in Spain, he has been making regular appearances in Hollywood horror films since 2013.

His roles include Tristana Medeiros in the REC franchise (2007–2009), the title character in Mama (2013), Set in The Mummy (2017), Slender Man in the 2018 film of the same name, and Dracula in The Last Voyage of the Demeter (2023). His appearances in horror films also include Crimson Peak (2015), The Conjuring 2 (2016), It (2017) and its 2019 sequel, Insidious: The Last Key (2018), and Scary Stories to Tell in the Dark (2019).

== Early life ==
Botet was born in Ciudad Real, Castile-La Mancha, the son of Agustín Andrés Botet Rodríguez and María del Carmen Servilia López Nieto.

At age five, he was diagnosed with Marfan syndrome. The hyperlaxity of certain body tissues brought about by Botet's condition has given him extremely long and fine fingers along with a tall, thin build, with Botet standing at 6 feet 7 inches (2.01 m) tall and weighing 123 pounds (56 kg).

== Career ==
Botet's unique physique, coupled with a personal interest in performing and fantasy, eventually led to his being cast in Brian Yuzna's Beneath Still Waters (2005). Two years later, he played the role of Tristana Medeiros in Jaume Balagueró and Paco Plaza's REC (2007).

=== Theater and television ===
In addition to film, Botet has acted in theatre productions, such as his portrayal of Frankenstein's monster in Teatros del Canal's stage adaptation of Frankenstein (2010). He has also appeared on television, including as a member of an alien species known as the Ba'ul in a 2019 episode of Star Trek: Discovery. Additionally that same year Botet appeared as a wight in the Game of Thrones episode The Long Night (2019).

== Awards ==
On 7 October 2019, Botet, along with actress Maribel Verdú, received the Màquina del Temps (English: Time Machine) award at the 2019 Sitges Film Festival. The annual award is specifically given to individuals from the fantasy genre for excellence in their field.

== Personal life ==
Botet lives in Madrid.

== Filmography ==
Actor (film)
Year	Film	Role(s)	Ref.
2005	Beneath Still Waters	Humanoid	
2007	REC	Tristana Medeiros	
2009	REC 2	Tristana Medeiros	
2013	Mama	Mama	
2013	Witching & Bitching	Luismi	
2015	Crimson Peak	Enola / Margaret / Pamela	
2016	The Other Side of the Door	Myrtu	
2016	The Conjuring 2	The Crooked Man	
2016	Don't Knock Twice	Ginger Special	
2017	The Mummy	Set	
2017	It	The Leper	
2018	Insidious: The Last Key	KeyFace	
2018	Slender Man	Slender Man	
2018	Mara	Mara	
2019	Scary Stories to Tell in the Dark	The Toeless Corpse	
2019	Polaroid (Note: Polaroid saw its planned 2017 wide release cancelled in favor of a 2019 limited release.)	Entity	
2019	It Chapter Two	The Leper / The Witch	
2019	Advantages of Travelling by Train	Gárate	
2019	Amigo	Javi	
2020	32 Malasana Street	Anciana Clara / Esteban Larrañaga	
2020	His House	The Apeth	
2020	Don't Listen	Cliente Librería	
2021	The Unemployment Club	Julián	
2023	The Fantastic Golem Affairs	Carlos	
2023	The Last Voyage of the Demeter	Dracula	
2023	The Boogeyman: The Origin of the Myth	Sack Man	
2026	Do Not Enter	Pale Creature	
2026	Upiro		
2026	Gummy	Mauro	
2026	La muerte de Drácula	Drácula	
Production crew member (film)
Year	Film	Title	Note
2017	Alien: Covenant	Movement Artist (Motion Capture)	

TV actor

Year	Title	Role	Notes	Ref
2019	Star Trek: Discovery	Ba'ul species	Season 2; episode 6: "The Sound of Thunder"	
2019	Game of Thrones	Wight	Season 8; episode 3: "The Long Night"	
2019–2020	Justo antes de Cristo	Silvio		
2021	The Neighbor	Tucker	Main. Introduced in season 2	
2021	#Luimelia	José Antonio, el Okupa	Main. Introduced in season 4	
2022	Dos años y un día	Adolfo	Main	
