= The Burning (2019 film) =

- Theatrical release poster
- Spanish: The Burning
- Directed by: Fernando Colomo
- Screenplay by: Javier Jáuregui
- Produced by: Beatriz de la Gándara; Álvaro Begines
- Starring: Joaquín Núñez; Manuela Velasco; Salva Reina; Maggie Civantos; Manuel Manquiña
- Cinematography: Juan Hernández
- Edited by: Ana Álvarez-Ossorio
- Music by: Fernando Furones
- Production companies: La Quema Movie AIE; Sangam Films; La Mirada Oblicua; La Fiesta PC
- Distributed by: Vértice Cine
- Release dates: 7 March 2019 (Málaga); 7 June 2019 (Spain)
- Country: Spain
- Language: Spanish

The Burning (Spanish: Antes de la quema) is a 2019 Spanish comedy thriller film directed by Fernando Colomo from a screenplay by Javier Jáuregui which stars Joaquín Núñez, Manuela Velasco, Salva Reina, Maggie Civantos, and Manuel Manquiña. It was billed as a "narco-chirigota".

== Plot ==
Set against the backdrop of the Carnival of Cádiz, the plot follows the relationship of chirigota composer Quique with local drug dealer El Tuti, who persuades him into stealing a huge cache of drugs guarded by the police before it is burned.

== Cast ==
- Salva Reina as Quique
- Manuela Velasco as Rosario
- Maggie Civantos as Meme
- Joaquín Núñez as El Tuti
- Manuel Manquiña as el Gallego
- María Alfonsa Rosso as Asun
- Vicente Romero
- César Mateo
- Sebastián Haro

== Production ==
The film is a La Quema Movie AIE, Sangam Films, La Mirada Oblicua, and La Fiesta PC production, with the participation of RTVE, Canal Sur, and Amazon Studios. Shooting locations in Cádiz included the Gran Teatro Falla, La Viña and La Caleta Beach.

== Release ==
The film was presented at the 22nd Málaga Film Festival on 7 March 2019. Distributed by Vértice Cine, it was released theatrically on 7 June 2019.

== Reception ==
Beatriz Martínez of Fotogramas rated the film 3 out of 5 stars, deeming it to be an "unexpected cross between carnivalesque humor, social cinema" "and action thriller".

Sergio F. Pinilla of Cinemanía rated the film 3 out of 5 stars, deeming it to be "a fresh and recommendable comedy".

== Accolades ==
Year	Award	Category	Nominee(s)	Result	Ref.
2019	22nd Málaga Film Festival	Best Supporting Actress	Maggie Civantos	Won	
2019	22nd Málaga Film Festival	Audience Special Awards		Won	

== See also ==
- List of Spanish films of 2019
