= The Nameless (film) =

- Original theatrical poster
- Spanish: Los sin nombre
- Directed by: Jaume Balagueró
- Screenplay by: Jaume Balagueró
- Based on: The Nameless by Ramsey Campbell
- Produced by: Julio Fernández
- Starring: Emma Vilarasau; Karra Elejalde; Tristán Ulloa
- Cinematography: Xavi Giménez
- Edited by: Luis de la Madrid
- Music by: Carles Cases
- Distributed by: Filmax
- Release dates: 8 October 1999 (Sitges); 12 November 1999 (Spain)
- Running time: 100 minutes
- Country: Spain
- Language: Spanish
- Budget: $900,000 (estimated)
- Box office: $3.9 million

The Nameless (Spanish: Los Sin Nombre; Catalan: Els sense nom) is a 1999 Spanish horror film written and directed by Jaume Balagueró in his directorial debut, and starring Emma Vilarasau, Karra Elejalde, and Tristán Ulloa. Based on the 1981 horror novel of the same name by English writer Ramsey Campbell, it follows a mother who receives a phone call from her believed-deceased daughter five years after her apparent occult-related ritualized murder, uncovering a nefarious cult preoccupied with the metaphysical aspects of corruption and evil.

The film premiered at the Sitges Film Festival in October 1999, and went on to receive the Méliès d'Or award at the Méliès International Festivals Federation. Filmax distributed the film theatrically in Spain, releasing it in November 1999. The Nameless proved to be a box-office success, and has been credited for spearheading a series of major studio horror films produced in Spain in the 2000s.

In the United States, the film was acquired by the Miramax subsidiary Dimension Films, who released it directly to video in 2005, after theatrically distributing Balagueró's second feature film, Darkness (2002).

== Plot ==
The gruesomely mutilated body of a girl is found in a manhole by Spanish police. The parents of missing six-year-old Angela Gifford, local editor Claudia and her British husband Marc, are duly notified. The identification is only deemed possible thanks to a bracelet and a four-centimeter leg length discrepancy. All other identifying traits are missing and the body shows needle insertions and acid burns, apparently inflicted antemortem.

Five years later, Claudia is still haunted by the tragedy. She is living alone, addicted to tranquilizers and stalked by her possessive ex-boyfriend Toni. One day, she receives a desperate phone call from someone identifying herself as her presumed dead daughter and begging to be rescued. Intrigued by the resemblance to Angela's voice and the mention of a seaside location where she used to take her daughter, Claudia visits the site. The nearby deserted clinic reveals grotesque angelic imagery and an orthopedic boot ostensibly left for her to find. Claudia contacts Massera, the detective who probed into Angela's disappearance. Despite his recent discharge from the force, he agrees to investigate.

Massera's research lends credibility to the hypothesis that Angela is alive, since a girl with similar characteristics disappeared around the same time and could have been used to fake Angela's death. A visit to a Jesuit expert in the Pontifical University uncovers a bizarre Satanic cult called The Nameless. It was first documented in Liverpool in 1962 and led by Argentinian expatriate Santini, whose scientific approach to ponerology went far beyond the activities of his original London occult circles. He believed in absolute evil and the path to reverse sanctity through heinous acts. He also advocated radical ego stripping to the point of losing one's name, thus the nameless sobriquet. Santini was arrested in 1982 for raping and mutilating two children. His project had links to the Thule Society and an accomplice of his, a neurologist from the Dachau concentration camp, was later released for lack of evidence.

Claudia and Massera cross paths with occult tabloid journalist Quiroga, who receives a videotape labelled with Claudia's phone number. It contains a snuff film featuring a young female victim, followed by surreptitious footage of Claudia visiting the derelict clinic. Fearing for her safety and sanity, Claudia spends the night in Massera's apartment. Their bond deepens when she learns he was widowed the previous year and is as despondent as herself. Meanwhile, her unhinged ex-boyfriend is approached in a bar by a hideously disfigured man whose stare had disturbed Claudia in an earlier scene. This stranger eggs Toni on to entering her apartment uninvited, and is joined by accomplices as they leave.

Claudia and Massera visit Santini in prison. His already disturbing countenance is compounded by a skin disease inoculated during his forceful internment in Dachau. He speaks to Claudia in riddles, obliquely mentions his acquaintance with Angela, recounts his confinement in a cobalt capsule in Dachau, and extols evil and suffering as sources of enlightenment. Claudia's pleas elicit his enigmatic advice to find Angela 'where it all began'. It soon becomes apparent that Santini's followers are still active; upon returning to her apartment, Claudia and Massera find Toni butchered, along with another cryptic message.

The trail leads to the now-abandoned hotel where Angela was conceived, thereby unveiling Santini's mysterious clue. Quiroga scouts ahead following indications by the Dachau neurologist but is quickly subdued and killed by cultists. Massera arrives soon thereafter and is murdered. Claudia is lured there by a phone call from Angela. She is greeted by cult members, including Angela's father. Marc reveals that Angela's conception, kidnapping, and corruption through torture was elaborately predetermined by the cult, in their quest for a pure evil being. Claudia confronts her visibly perverted daughter, whose task is now to commit the "ultimate atrocity" she was groomed and conditioned for: matricide. Instead, Angela shoots Marc through the door and briefly seems to resist the indoctrination – before proclaiming she has a plan more sinister than the cult's own. She cynically tells Claudia "I will call you [again]", before putting the gun in her mouth and pulling the trigger.

== Cast ==
- Emma Vilarasau as Claudia Horts
- Karra Elejalde as Massara
- Tristán Ulloa as Quiroga
- Toni Sevilla as Franco
- Brendan Price as Marc Gifford
- Jordi Dauder as Forense
- Pep Tosar as Toni
- Carlos Lasarte as Santini
- Josep Maria Domènech as Romero
- Jessica Del Pozo as Angela Gifford

== Analysis ==
Writing on the film's ambiguous conclusion, Jessica Balanzategui notes that narrative renders it impossible to discern whether or not the Angela that Claudia meets in the final scene is actually her daughter, leaving the audience "trapped in a perceptual gap incarnated by the child's subversive ambiguity," and the character of Claudia "forever entombed by the any-space-whatever of traumatic loss... a desolate future in which [she] will endlessly be tormented by a chain of "nameless" children posing as Angela."

== Production ==
Filming of The Nameless took place in Barcelona in 1998. After reading the novel The Nameless by Ramsey Campbell, Jaume Balagueró became enamored with the work citing the material's original story line and its handling of the seductive nature of evil and perversion which inspired him to adapt and direct a film adaptation.

== Release ==
=== Box office ===
The Nameless was a financial success, grossing $1,091,211 in Italy alone, with total worldwide earnings of $3,892,784.

=== Critical response ===
As of December 2022, the film has a 20% approval rating on internet review aggregator Rotten Tomatoes, based on five reviews. Common criticisms were aimed at the incomprehensible and convoluted plot.

In the 2011 book Directory of World Cinema: Spain, Lorenzo J. Torres Hortelano named the film "one of the most ambitious genre debuts of the last 20 years, supported by solid acting and the cold, murky cinematography of Xavi Giménez."

=== Accolades ===
Institution	Category	Recipient	Result	Ref.
Brussels International Fantastic Film Festival	Golden Raven Award	Jaume Balagueró	Won	
Fantafestival	Best Film	Jaume Balagueró	Won	
Fantasia International Film Festival	Best Film	Jaume Balagueró	Won	
Gérardmer Film Festival	Ciné-Live Award	Jaume Balagueró	Won	
Gérardmer Film Festival	International Critics Award	Jaume Balagueró	Won	
Gérardmer Film Festival	Special Jury Prize	Jaume Balagueró	Won	
Gérardmer Film Festival	Youth Jury Grand Prize	Jaume Balagueró	Won	
Méliès International Festivals Federation	Méliès d'Or	Jaume Balagueró	Won	
Fantasporto	Critics' Award	Jaume Balagueró	Won	
Fantasporto	Best Director — International Fantasy Film	Jaume Balagueró	Won (Note: Tied with Ben Hopkins for The Nine Lives of Tomas Katz.)	
Fantasporto	Best International Fantasy Film	Jaume Balagueró	Nominated	
Sitges Film Festival	Best Leading Actress	Emma Vilarasau	Won	
Sitges Film Festival	Best Cinematography	Xavi Giménez	Won	

=== Home media ===
Miramax bought the US distribution rights for the film in 1999, but did not release it on home video until 2005.

Licensing the title from Miramax, Echo Bridge Entertainment re-released the film in the United States on DVD and Blu-ray on May 10, 2011, and on March 10, 2013, respectively. The Blu-ray received negative reviews, for the poor picture quality and visible print damage, only including a very poorly dubbed English audio track and no Spanish audio track, lack of subtitles, using a film print for the disc that was not even created for the film's release in Spain (the occasional subtitle in the film is in Catalan), and no special features. The discs are rare now, as they have gone out of print.

In Spain, Filmax issued a special edition DVD and Blu-ray combination set on 6 July 2017, which contains both the original Spanish audio as well as the English-dubbed version. A standalone Blu-ray was subsequently issued by Filmax on 5 September 2019.

== Legacy ==
The financial success of The Nameless has been cited by film scholars such as Antonio Lázaro-Reboll for marking the beginning of a series of numerous studio horror films produced in Spain, from Balagueró's subsequent film [REC] and The Orphanage (both released in 2007), marking a "way of making films in Barcelona [typified] by quality genre production."

== Sources ==
- Balanzategui, Jessica (2015). ""Insects trapped in amber": The Mutant Child Seer in Contemporary Spanish Horror Film". In Bohlmann, Markus P. J.; Moreland, Sean (eds.). Monstrous Children and Childish Monsters: Essays on Cinema's Holy Terrors. Jefferson, North Carolina: McFarland. pp. 225–244. ISBN 978-0-786-49479-8.
- Hortelano, Lorenzo J. Torres, ed. (2011). Directory of World Cinema: Spain. Bristol, England: Intellect Books. ISBN 9781-841-50463-6.
- Lázaro-Reboll, Antonio (2017). "Generating Fear: From Fantastic Factory (2000–2005) to [REC] (2007–2014)". In Marí, Jorge (ed.). Tracing the Borders of Spanish Horror Cinema and Television. New York City, New York: Routledge. pp. 161–189. ISBN 978-1-351-85851-9.
- Merino, Julio Ángel Olivares (2011). Jaume Balagueró: En nombre de la oscuridad (in Spanish). Madrid, Spain: Ediciones AKAL. ISBN 978-8-446-02919-9.
