= Quarantine (2008 film) =

Film by John Erick Dowdle

- Theatrical release poster
- Directed by: John Erick Dowdle
- Screenplay by: John Erick Dowdle; Drew Dowdle
- Based on: Rec by: Jaume Balagueró; Luiso Berdejo and; Paco Plaza
- Produced by: Sergio Aguero; Doug Davison; Roy Lee
- Starring: Jennifer Carpenter; Jay Hernandez; Columbus Short; Greg Germann; Steve Harris; Dania Ramirez; Rade Šerbedžija; Johnathon Schaech
- Cinematography: Ken Seng
- Edited by: Elliott Greenberg
- Production companies: Screen Gems; Andale Pictures; Filmax; Vertigo Entertainment
- Distributed by: Sony Pictures Releasing (United States); Filmax (Spain)
- Release date: October 10, 2008 (United States)
- Running time: 89 minutes
- Countries: United States; Spain
- Languages: English; Spanish
- Budget: $12 million
- Box office: $41.3 million

Quarantine is a 2008 found footage zombie film directed and co-written by John Erick Dowdle, produced by Sergio Aguero, Doug Davison, and Roy Lee, and co-written by Drew Dowdle. The film stars Jennifer Carpenter, Jay Hernandez, Columbus Short, Greg Germann, Steve Harris, Dania Ramirez, Rade Šerbedžija, and Johnathon Schaech.

A remake of the 2007 Spanish film Rec, it follows a reporter and her cameraman assigned to a pair of Los Angeles firemen who follow a distress call to an apartment building where they discover a deadly mutated strain of rabies spreading among the building's occupants; escape becomes impossible once the government descends upon the building to prevent the virus from spreading beyond it, and the pair continue to record the events that unfold inside, of which the film itself is the result.

Quarantine features no actual musical score, using only sound effects, and differs in its characters, dialogue, and explanation of the virus from its source material.

Quarantine was released in the United States by Sony's subsidiary Screen Gems on October 10, 2008. The film received mixed reviews from critics and grossed $41.3 million worldwide at the box office. It was followed by a sequel, Quarantine 2: Terminal (2011).

== Plot ==
On the evening of March 11, 2008, news reporter Angela Vidal and her cameraman, Scott Percival, film a report on the night shift at the Los Angeles Fire Department. Firefighters Jake and George Fletcher respond to an emergency at a local apartment building, where elderly resident Mrs. Espinosa has been heard screaming by landlord Yuri, his wife Wanda, and residents Lawrence; Bernard and his roommate, Sadie; Randy; Kathy and her daughter, Briana; and immigrant couple Nadif and Jwahir. Angela and Scott enter with police officers Danny and James. Espinosa attacks them, biting James and Fletcher, and Danny shoots her. They find another resident, Elise, in a similar condition and bring her downstairs. Those bitten by Espinosa soon become sick and delirious.

Authorities and the CDC quarantine the building, preventing anyone from leaving. Angela interviews Briana, who says her dog named Max is at the vet because it was sick. Lawrence recognizes the symptoms as similar to rabies. Angela, Scott, Bernard, and Sadie witness a rabid dog maul Randy to death. When Elise attacks them, Scott kills her in self-defense. CDC officers wearing hazmat suits enter to examine Fletcher and James, who awaken and attack an officer and Lawrence. A surviving inspector explains that Briana's infected dog Max prompted the quarantine. Briana becomes infected, bites her mother, and flees. The group later finds her, but she bites Danny, causing the others to retreat downstairs as the infected break loose. Kathy is killed, while Nadif and Jwahir are infected by Lawrence.

The survivors barricade themselves upstairs but discover that both the inspector and Sadie have been bitten. Bernard tries to escape but is killed by a sniper outside. Yuri believes the basement, which connects to the sewers, may provide an escape route. However, he is attacked and bitten by the health inspector, who has succumbed to the infection. Wanda refuses to abandon Yuri and is bitten by Sadie. Jake, Angela, and Scott flee.

The trio find the basement key while fighting through the infected, but Jake is bitten by Yuri, leaving Angela and Scott as the only survivors. Forced into the attic apartment, they discover lab equipment and newspaper clippings belonging to a former tenant who was a member of a doomsday cult. The tenant had broken into a military biological facility and stolen a biological weapon called the Armageddon Virus, a mutated form of rabies that is highly contractable and deadly.

A trapdoor opens in the attic, and an infected boy knocks away Scott's camera light. Scott switches to night vision, and he and Angela hear banging inside the apartment. They discover an emaciated person apparently unaware of them and blindly searching the room. They attempt to sneak away, but the infected person attacks and beats Scott to death. Angela retrieves the camera and sees the attacker eating Scott before she is attacked herself. She drops the camera and is dragged into the darkness.

== Cast ==
- Jennifer Carpenter as Angela Vidal
- Steve Harris as Scott Percival
- Jay Hernandez as Jake
- Johnathon Schaech as George Fletcher
- Columbus Short as Danny Wilensky
- Dania Ramirez as Sadie
- Andrew Fiscella as James McCreedy
- Rade Šerbedžija as Yuri Ivanov
- Elaine Kagan as Wanda Marimon
- Greg Germann as Lawrence
- Bernard White as Bernard
- Marin Hinkle as Kathy
- Joey King as Briana
- Jermaine A. Jackson as Nadif
- Sharon Ferguson as Jwahir
- Denis O'Hare as Randy
- Stacy Chbosky as Elise Jackson
- Jeannie Epper as Mrs. Espinoza
- Doug Jones as Thin Infected Man

Ben Messmer, who starred in director John Erick Dowdle's previous film The Poughkeepsie Tapes, makes an appearance as firefighter Griffin.

== Production ==
=== Development ===
In August 2007, it was announced Screen Gems had begun working on a remake of REC. Duo filmmakers John Erick Dowdle and Drew Dowdle were hired to write and direct the film, while Roy Lee, Sergio Aguero and Doug Davison are serving as producers.

Unusually for a Hollywood production, Quarantine does not feature a musical score. The apartment complex was a set but a fully functioning one with four floors.

=== Filming ===
Principal photography on their film began in January 2008 and wrapped in March 2008 in Downtown, Los Angeles, California. The film was shot in chronological order and the average shot was between four and six minutes long.

== Release ==
Quarantine was released in the United States on October 10, 2008, by Screen Gems. On its opening day, the film grossed $5,379,867, ranking #1 in the box office. The film opened at #2, behind the second weekend of Beverly Hills Chihuahua, earning $14,211,321 in its opening weekend. It grossed a total of $41,319,906 worldwide against a production budget of $12 million.

=== Home media ===
Quarantine was released February 17, 2009, on DVD and Blu-ray.

== Reception ==
=== Critical response ===
The film was not screened in advance for American critics. On Rotten Tomatoes, the film reports an 56% of critics gave positive reviews based on 86 reviews; the average rating is 5.60/10. The site's critical consensus reads "Quarantine uses effective atmosphere and consistent scares to stand above the crop of recent horror films." Metacritic reported the film had an aggregate score of 53/100 based on 14 reviews, which indicates "mixed or average reviews". Audiences polled by CinemaScore gave the film an average grade of "C" on an A+ to F scale.

Quarantine received a 3.5/5 stars from Bloody Disgusting, which wrote, "A study in claustrophobia, expertly cast, edited and staged with expert meticulousness and precision, the film’s only major flaw is the need to explain that which never needed explaining." Michael Gingold of Fangoria rated it 3/4 stars and called it "an acceptable substitute" for the original film. Empire was lukewarm in its response but critical of the rushed and copied-verbatim style of the remake. Reviewing it in The New York Times, Jeannette Catsoulis praised its "solid acting and perfectly calibrated shocks".

Paul Nicholasi of Dread Central rated it 1.5/5 stars and called it hard to watch, both because of the shaky cam and the pacing. Joe Leydon of Variety described it as "a modestly inventive, sporadically exciting thriller that nonetheless proves too faithful to its central conceit for its own good."

=== Artistic response ===
Jaume Balagueró, who co-wrote and directed the REC series, disliked Quarantine, stating; "It's impossible for me to like, because it's a copy. It's the same, except for the finale. It's impossible to enjoy Quarantine after REC. I don't understand why they avoided the religious themes; they lost a very important part of the end of the movie."

Paco Plaza stated that Quarantine "helped REC to become more popular than it was. It moved a spotlight onto our film. You know, the fact that it was going to be remade in Hollywood, it was big news in Europe. Everyone knew that it existed, this tiny Spanish film."

== Awards ==
Year	Award	Category	Result
2009	Reaper Award	"Best Zombie Film"	Won
2009	Fangoria Chainsaw Awards	2nd place for Best Make-Up/Creature FX (Robert Hall)	Won
2009	Saturn Awards	Best Horror Film	Nominated
