= Darkness (2002 film) =

Film by Jaume Balagueró

- Promotional poster
- Directed by: Jaume Balagueró
- Written by: Jaume Balagueró; Fernando de Felipe
- Produced by: Julio Fernández; Brian Yuzna
- Starring: Anna Paquin; Lena Olin; Iain Glen; Giancarlo Giannini; Fele Martínez; Fermin Reixach; Stephan Enquist
- Cinematography: Xavi Giménez
- Edited by: Luis de la Madrid
- Music by: Carles Cases
- Production companies: Fantastic Factory Filmax International; Dimension Films
- Distributed by: Filmax (Spain); Miramax Films (United States)
- Release dates: 3 October 2002 (Sitges); 11 October 2002 (Spain); 25 December 2004 (United States)
- Running time: 102 minutes; 88 minutes (U.S. and British theatrical cut)
- Countries: Spain; United States
- Language: English
- Budget: $10.6 million–11 million
- Box office: $34.4 million

Darkness is a 2002 supernatural horror film directed by Jaume Balagueró, and starring Anna Paquin, Lena Olin, Iain Glen, Giancarlo Giannini, and Fele Martínez. It follows an American family who move into a house in the Spanish countryside, where six children disappeared during an occult ritual forty years before; the teenage daughter and young son of the family are subjected to increasing disturbances in the house.

The film was an international co-production between Spain's Filmax and the American studio Dimension Films, and co-produced by Julio Fernández and Brian Yuzna. Development began in late 2000, and the film was shot on location in Barcelona in 2001.

Darkness premiered at the Sitges Film Festival in Spain on 3 October 2002, and was released in theaters across the country eight days later on 11 October 2002. It was released in United States in an edited, PG-13-rated cut on 25 December 2004. The film was widely panned by critics, but was a commercial success, earning $34.4 million worldwide. Some film scholars have compared it to the works of Edgar Allan Poe and H. P. Lovecraft, and noted it for its theme of family dysfunction set against paranormal events.

== Plot ==
In the early 1960s, an unfinished occult ritual results in the disappearance of six young children in the Spanish countryside.

40 years later, Mark Rua, his wife Maria, and their two children—teenage Regina, and young Paul—relocate from the United States to Mark's native Spain, settling in a large country home outside Barcelona. The family have partly relocated to be closer to Mark's father, Albert, an accomplished physician who resides in the city. Soon after the move, Mark begins to suffer from seizures due to the progression of his Huntington's disease, which also causes him to become increasingly mentally unstable.

The family's home is plagued by recurring electrical problems, leading to power outages that further exacerbate tensions, especially between Regina, Mark, and Maria. Regina expresses worry about her father's declining medical condition, while Maria appears to be in denial about her husband's health. Meanwhile, Paul is plagued by supernatural occurrences at home and develops a fear of the dark. Apparitions of six children watch an unknowing Regina, and on several occasions, Regina notices a strange man observing the house from the road. While renovating a crawlspace under the stairs, Mark discovers a strange antique photograph of three women in sunglasses.

As Mark's symptoms worsen and he begins to deteriorate and lash out mentally, Regina begins investigating the history of the house with the help of Carlos, a young swimming teacher she has started dating. The two track the home's history to Villalobos, the architect who designed the house, and whom Regina has seen watching it from a distance. They discover that the home was constructed for a supernatural ritual requiring the sacrifice of six children (each sacrificed by "hands that love them") to coincide with an eclipse that only occurs every 40 years. With the next eclipse quickly approaching, and now armed with the knowledge that the earlier occult ritual needs one more death to be completed, Regina fears Paul will be the next victim.

Regina and Carlos visit her grandfather, Albert, to disclose their discovery, only to find that Albert is in fact a member of the cult, which has been performing these Satanic rituals. Albert explains that in the ritual 40 years ago, there were actually seven children, the seventh being Regina's father. Albert was unable to sacrifice his son because, at the last minute, he realized that he did not love him. Now, after 40 years, he has brought Mark and his family to the house with the intention of completing the ritual during this eclipse and opening a portal to hell. Regina also discovers the target is not Paul but still Mark, who is to be sacrificed by "hands that love him." As Regina laments, Albert realizes her genuine love for her father. He suddenly frees her to return to the house, aware that she will be able to carry out the ritual unknowingly.

Regina races back to her home to find her father in the midst of another attack, choking on pills as the eclipse begins. Maria tries to perform a tracheotomy on him, but is unable to bring herself to cut. In a panic, Regina does it instead, but Mark bleeds out and dies when the supernatural forces within the house hide the pen tube needed to complete the procedure. Because Regina genuinely loved her father, the ritual was completed. The darkness then takes the form of Regina and Paul, convincing Maria to turn off the lights. The darkness then kills Maria and takes the form of Regina's friend Carlos, who picks them up in his car; shortly after they leave, the actual Carlos arrives at the house and is called inside by the darkness, manifesting as Regina's voice. Carlos' doppelgänger drives Regina and Paul into a dark tunnel, implying their doom.

== Cast ==
- Anna Paquin as Regina "Reggie" Rua
- Lena Olin as Maria Rua
- Iain Glen as Mark Rua
- Giancarlo Giannini as Albert Rua
- Fele Martínez as Carlos
- Stephan Enquist as Paul Rua
- Fermin Reixach as Villalobos
- David Martí as Man Sleeping on Bus (uncredited)

== Production ==
=== Development ===
In October 2000, it was announced Filmax had sold U.S. distribution rights of Balagueró's 1999 film The Nameless and the then-unmade Darkness to Miramax Films, with Miramax's Dimension Films division slated to co-produce the latter and provide forty percent of the budget. At that time, it was noted that the film was scheduled to shoot in Barcelona in early 2001.

=== Casting ===
Casting for Darkness took place in both Barcelona and New York City. The casting of Lena Olin and Iain Glen was announced in April 2001, in addition to Anna Paquin. Prior to Paquin's casting, Natalie Portman was considered for the lead role.

=== Filming ===
Principal photography of Darkness began on 26 April 2001 in and around Barcelona, on a budget of $10.6–$11 million. Filming was scheduled to end in late June 2001.

Director Jaume Balagueró cited The Amityville Horror (1979) and The Shining (1980) as key influences on Darkness.

== Release ==
Darkness had its world premiere at the Sitges Film Festival on 3 October 2002. It was then given a wide release in Spain the following week, on 11 October 2002. The film was released in a number of European countries throughout 2003, but its United States release was shelved for nearly two years. On 24 November 2004, Dimension Films premiered a theatrical trailer for the film online, before launching a television advertising campaign over the following several weeks. Dimension Films released the film on 25 December 2004, in a heavily censored PG-13 version. It was given an even later release in the United Kingdom, on 18 March 2005, also in the truncated 88-minute cut.

=== Home media ===
In North America, Buena Vista Home Entertainment released Darkness on DVD in two different editions in 2005: One consisting of the original cut then-unrated by the Motion Picture Association of America, and one in the PG-13 cut released in theaters.

Echo Bridge Entertainment issued the film on Blu-ray for the first time in July 2012, featuring the extended cut. On 28 May 2024, Shout! Factory re-released the film on Blu-ray as a web store exclusive limited to 1,800 copies.

== Reception ==
=== Box office ===
Despite receiving very little promotion, Darkness performed well at the box office. In Spain, it earned €1.6 million during its opening weekend and concluded its theatrical run with a gross of €4 million. In the United States, where it was released on Christmas Day 2004 (a Saturday) in 1,718 theaters, it was the seventh-highest earner that weekend with $6.1 million (at $3,625 average per theater). The following week, it dropped to tenth-highest earner with $4.6 million. The film ultimately earned $22,163,442 in the United States, making for a total worldwide gross of $33,988,736.

=== Critical response ===
Darkness received largely unfavorable critical reviews. On the review aggregator website Rotten Tomatoes, 5% of 56 critics' reviews are positive, with an average rating of 2.5/10. The website's consensus reads: "Yet another predictable variation on the hoary old haunted-house movie, Darkness is an illogical, portentous mess." Metacritic, which uses a weighted average, assigned the film a score of 15 out of 100, based on 16 critics, indicating "overwhelming dislike". It received an average rating of "F" on CinemaScore.

The Los Angeles Times's Kevin Thomas awarded the film one out of four stars, deeming it "trite and flat," and "too mechanical to be persuasive or scary." Ned Martel of The New York Times noted: "Darkness, which crept into theaters nationwide on Christmas Day, tries to spook holiday revelers with a guessing game about which member of a handsome American family, relocated to Spain, will kill another. But the real mystery is why such a mangled film was not junked altogether." Owen Gleiberman of Entertainment Weekly said the film is "a horror movie so vague about the nightmare it’s spinning, it seems scared of its own shadows... Darkness was clearly tossed together like salad in the editing room, since it’s little more than the sum of its unshocking shock cuts." David Blaylock The Village Voice also gave the film a middling review, writing: "Moments hint at a metaphoric statement on child abuse, but the film proves mainly to be a commentary on poor electrical wiring." Bilge Ebiri of The New York Sun similarly noted the film as containing elements of "a disturbing family drama," adding that it is "at its best when exploring Dad's bouts with his inner demons - but it's quickly stifled by tired attempts to jolt the audience and more narrative dead-ends.

The Guardian's Peter Bradshaw derided the film as a poor imitation of The Shining, and awarded it a one out of five star-rating. Frank Scheck of The Hollywood Reporter praised the film's cinematography, but criticized its script: "Although director Balaguero displays a talent for spooky visuals and creating an atmosphere of quietly simmering tension, his screenplay (co-written by Fernando de Felipe) is a compendium of barely connected scenes that ultimately lapse into incoherence." Marc Savlov of The Austin Chronicle called the film "Eurotrash for the new millennium," comparing it negatively against Lucio Fulci's The Beyond (1981) and Dario Argento's Inferno (1980), summarizing: "Despite the very occasional shock... Darkness is a god-awful mess, the kind of monstrous misfire that makes your mind ache and your teeth grind." Jennifer Green of Screen Daily conceded that the film features "cleverly crafted" and "haunting" visuals, praising the work of cinematographer Xavi Gimenez and editor Luis de la Madrid, but felt the performances were lackluster "considering the caliber of the cast."

Michael Gingold of Fangoria gave the film a rare favorable review, noting that "the dynamics among the various family members are plausibly played out, even if specific scenes between them don’t always ring true," and concluded "It’s once he’s gotten past the exposition that Balagueró really gets cooking, and the final 10-15 minutes are full of genuine shivers. The movie’s title isn’t just a random scary moniker; the plot ultimately proves to actually hinge on darkness, and Balagueró and Gimenez’s use of light and the lack thereof is expert throughout."

=== Accolades ===
Institution	Year	Category	Recipient	Result	Ref.
Barcelona Film Awards	2002	Best Film	Jaume Balagueró	Won	
Barcelona Film Awards	2002	Best Cinematography	Xavi Giménez	Won	
Fantasporto	2002	Best Film	Jaume Balagueró	Nominated	
Goya Awards	2002	Best Sound	Salva Mayolas; Dani Fontrodona; Marc Orts	Nominated	
Sitges Film Festival	2002	Best Film	Jaume Balagueró	Nominated	

=== Themes and analysis ===
Professor Ann Davies wrote that Darkness shares similarities with the Edgar Allan Poe story The Fall of the House of Usher (1839), and commented on its narrative focus on "Gothic dysfunction and degeneration" of family relationships. The breakdown of the family (especially in relationship to the father's ancestry) are reflected in the "increasing evidence of evil" within the house. Davies also sees the film's representation of a haunted house as "part of a wider Gothic mode" both in Spanish cinema and beyond, which "tap into memories and reflections of traumas that are unconfined by national boundaries."

Shelagh Rowan-Legg, writing in The Spanish Fantastic: Contemporary Filmmaking in Horror, Fantasy and Sci-fi (2016) observes similar themes of familial dissolution paralleled by the supernatural: "In Darkness, the actions/events created by the cult draw out representations of the unstable family: Albert could not kill Mark because he did not love him, and Mark left the country with his mother. Upon his return home, the ensuing tension of the melodrama is represented through the return of Mark's mental illness, driven by supernatural forces. The resolution of the narrative—the entrapment of the remaining family members in the home–represents the idea that an unstable family is doomed."

Some writers and critics observed that the film shares elements with H. P. Lovecraft's The Case of Charles Dexter Ward (1927), particularly the story's antagonist, Yog-Sothoth.

== See also ==
- List of Spanish films of 2002
- List of films featuring eclipses

== Sources ==
- Davies, Ann (2016). "The Gothic House: Problematising the National Space". Contemporary Spanish Gothic. Edinburgh, Scotland: Edinburgh University Press. pp. 84–110. doi:10.1515/9781474403009-006. ISBN 978-1-474-40300-9. JSTOR 10.3366/j.ctt1g0513v.
- Lazaro-Reboll, Antonio (2012). Spanish Horror Film. Edinburgh, Scotland: Edinburgh University Press. ISBN 978-0-748-67062-8.
- Merino, Julio Ángel Olivares (2011). Jaume Balagueró: En nombre de la oscuridad (in Spanish). Madrid, Spain: Ediciones AKAL. ISBN 978-8-446-02919-9.
- Mira, Alberto (2019). Historical Dictionary of Spanish Cinema (Second ed.). Lanham, Maryland: Rowman & Littlefield. ISBN 978-1-538-12268-6.
- Muir, John Kenneth (2023). Horror Films of 2000-2009. Jefferson, North Carolina: McFarland. ISBN 978-1-476-64450-9.
- Monush, Barry; Willis, John, eds. (2006). Screen World: 2005 Film Annual. New York City, New York: Applause Books. ISBN 978-1-557-83667-0.
- Oliveira, Rui M. Trindade (2022). Supranational Horrors: Italian and Spanish Horror Cinema since 1968. Lanham, Maryland: Lexington Books. ISBN 978-1-793-65435-9.
- Rowan-Legg, Shelagh (2016). The Spanish Fantastic: Contemporary Filmmaking in Horror, Fantasy and Sci-fi. New York City, New York: I.B. Taurus. ISBN 978-1-786-73078-7.
