= Jonathan D. Mellor =

Spanish film actor and director

- Born: Jonathan David Mellor; 1968 (age 57–58); Liverpool, Merseyside, England
- Occupations: Actor and writer
- Years active: 2009–present

Jonathan David Mellor is a theatre director and film actor. He has appeared in numerous films, including [REC]² and The Wine of Summer, both in Spain and the U.S.

== Career ==
Mellor starred in the short film Voice Over, directed by Martin Rosete, which was nominated for Best Fictional Short Film at 27th Goya Awards. He starred also in the Drama Horror film Don't Look There. The lead role required acting in three different scenarios that expressed a single emotional state. Mellor starred in the movie [REC]2 in 2009.

== Selected filmography ==
- [REC]² (2009) ... Dr. Owen
- The Story of David Leonard Sutton (2010) ... Leonard Sutton
- Voice Over (2011) ... Lead
- In Between ( 2012)- Dr. William Dyler, also writer.
- very one dies at the end (2013) ... Alan Moore
- The Wine of Summer (2013) ... Henry
- Melita (2017) ... Narrator
- Tango One (2018) ... Doyle
- Knight and Day (2010)... Barman
