= Rec (film) =

2007 film by Jaume Balagueró and Paco Plaza

- Theatrical release poster
- Directed by: Jaume Balagueró; Paco Plaza
- Written by: Jaume Balagueró; Paco Plaza; Luiso Berdejo
- Produced by: Julio Fernández
- Starring: Manuela Velasco; Ferrán Terraza; Jorge-Yamam Serrano; Pablo Rosso; David Vert; Vicente Gil; Martha Carbonell; Carlos Vicente
- Cinematography: Pablo Rosso
- Edited by: David Gallart
- Production company: Castelao Productions
- Distributed by: Filmax
- Release date: 23 November 2007
- Running time: 78 minutes
- Country: Spain
- Languages: Spanish; Japanese
- Budget: $2 million
- Box office: $32.5 million

Rec (stylized as [•REC]; short for "record") is a 2007 Spanish found footage supernatural horror film co-written and directed by Jaume Balagueró and Paco Plaza. The film stars Manuela Velasco as television reporter Ángela Vidal, who, along with her cameraman, accompany firefighters on a late-night call to an apartment building in Barcelona, where an outbreak prompts authorities to seal the building and place its occupants under quarantine.

Rec was released on 23 November 2007 to critical and commercial success. It has appeared on lists and retrospectives covering found-footage and horror cinema.

The film spawned the Rec film series, which includes three sequels: Rec 2 (2009), Rec 3: Genesis (2012), and Rec 4: Apocalypse (2014). An American remake, Quarantine, was released in 2008, followed by Quarantine 2: Terminal (2011).

== Plot ==
Television reporter Ángela Vidal and her cameraman, Pablo, film a night shift at a Barcelona fire station for the programme While You're Sleeping. They accompany firefighters Álex and Manu to an apartment building after reports that an elderly resident is behaving erratically. Inside the apartment, the woman attacks and bites a police officer. As panic spreads, authorities seal the building, trapping residents and emergency personnel inside under quarantine.

Attempts to control the situation fail as more people display violent symptoms and begin attacking others. A health official in protective gear arrives and explains that the infection resembles rabies and may have originated with a dog from the building. The group searches for a way out, only to find stairwells and exits blocked. Several survivors take temporary refuge in a resident's flat while they plan an escape route through the basement.

As the outbreak escalates, Ángela and Pablo fight their way upstairs, pursued by the infected. They reach the penthouse, where they discover religious material and evidence of a prior investigation. A tape recording indicates that the penthouse occupant, acting on behalf of the Vatican, had been studying a sick Portuguese girl, Tristana Medeiros, whose condition was believed to be linked to demonic possession; the illness mutated into a contagious infection, and she was sealed inside.

In the darkened attic, Pablo switches the camera to night vision. An emaciated Tristana attacks, killing Pablo. Ángela flees but drops the camera; she is dragged into the darkness, screaming, as the footage ends.

== Cast ==
- Manuela Velasco as Ángela Vidal, a reporter for While You're Sleeping
- Pablo Rosso as Pablo, Ángela's cameraman
- Ferrán Terraza as Manu, a firefighter
- David Vert as Álex, a firefighter
- Jorge-Yamam Serrano as Sergio, a police officer
- Vicente Gil as the older police officer
- Carlos Vicente as Guillem Marimón, a doctor living in the building
- Carlos Lasarte as César, a resident
- María Lanau as Mari Carmen, Jennifer's mother
- Claudia Silva as Jennifer
- Martha Carbonell as Conchita Izquierdo
- Akemi Goto as the Japanese woman
- Chen Min Kao as the Japanese man
- María Teresa Ortega as the grandmother
- Manuel Bronchud as the grandfather
- Javier Botet as Tristana Medeiros
- Ben Temple as the doctor
- Ana Velasquez as the Colombian girl
- Daniel Trinh as the Japanese child
- Marita Borrego as fire station dispatcher #1
- Jana Prats as fire station dispatcher #2 (credited as Ana Prats)
- Víctor Massagué as the child in the attic
- Javier Coromina as Pablo (voice)

== Production ==
In October 2006, it was announced Jaume Balagueró and Paco Plaza would direct the film for Filmax. Balagueró and Plaza had previously directed the 2002 documentary OT: la película.

=== Development and approach ===
Balagueró and Plaza said they set out to tell a classic horror scenario using what they called "the language of television", staged as if a report were unfolding live with a single camera at the centre of events. They cited an epidemic scenario and their affection for zombie cinema as guiding reference points.

Velasco recalled that auditions leaned heavily on improvisation, including being asked to "report" surreal, chaotic situations as if live television, and to play small off-camera presenter beats with the cameraman.

The directors said the apartment building became a major creative constraint: the script was finalised in the building and reshaped around what was physically available due to budget limits, including changing a scripted "driving school" meeting point to a textile warehouse found on site.

=== Filming ===
Principal photography took place in late 2006 in Barcelona, Spain.

On the audio commentary, Balagueró and Plaza said the opening material at the fire station was filmed like a genuine TV segment at an active Barcelona fire station, using real firefighters, uniforms and equipment; they recalled having no script for the interviews and being interrupted by real emergency call-outs during shooting.

The directors highlighted the film's reliance on extended takes, including a continuous sequence they described as lasting "10 minutes or so" with "no cuts" as the camera moves from the fire engine into the building and up through the action. They also described staging select beats without warning some performers in order to capture spontaneous reactions, including a stairwell moment in which "none of the actors knew" a falling body would appear.

Balagueró and Plaza said the film was shot in chronological order, which allowed them to review assembled scenes during production and adjust staging and dialogue to avoid repetition as events escalated. They also said the cast were not given the full script and were given a "false ending" during production to keep performances reactive to unfolding events. Plaza added that one on-set rule was to keep rolling—"we would never stop filming, whatever happened"—including through accidental falls and collisions. Velasco likewise said she was not told how the film ended and that some beats were staged without her foreknowledge; for one night-vision sequence, she recalled being told to "react to whatever happens".

Velasco said shooting chronologically also extended to costume continuity, with her white top kept throughout so it could become progressively dirtier and bloodied over the course of the story. She described the long takes and repeated stair runs as physically demanding, and noted that the production often filmed at night.

=== Cinematography ===
Cinematographer Pablo Rosso said the camera was required to remain strictly reactive—"at no stage could the camera be one second ahead of events"—to preserve the feeling of live coverage; he cited television as a primary visual influence and described treating the camera as a character within the action. He said the building was lit largely from outside the set, including "through a skylight above the staircase", supplemented by practical wall lamps installed by the art department.

Balagueró and Plaza said they treated the camera as vulnerable within the story, raising the idea "What if the camera was also infected?" after a blood strike on the lens, and altering exposure and image behaviour accordingly. For the night-vision finale, they said they used an amateur MiniDV camera because professional cameras lacked night-vision capability, transferring the resulting footage to 35mm. Rosso said the set had to be in complete darkness, leaving the actors effectively unable to see while he monitored the action through the viewfinder.

=== Sound ===
Sound designer Oriol Tarragó said the film was conceived without a musical score and balanced special effects with what he called a "documentary feel", keeping the soundtrack aligned to the camera's perspective. Tarragó said infected vocalisations were created by blending performer recordings with animal sounds and other sources to give different infected distinct character while maintaining overall consistency.

Both Tarragó and the directors described pushing the corridor gunshot to an intentionally harsh, distorted impact to evoke the deafening effect of an indoor gunshot. Tarragó said the night-vision sequence strips the mix back so that "the only thing you can hear is them breathing", and he highlighted the use of off-camera noises to suggest a threatening presence before it is seen.

Sound recordist Xavi Mas described the production's long moving takes as "a bit like a dance" between cast and crew, and said the team briefly considered recording sound directly on the camera but rejected it to avoid losing dialogue and subtle details. Mas said the production began with "ten live tracks" and used ten microphones for most of the shoot, which increased the complexity of dialogue editing in post-production.

=== Make-up and effects ===
On the audio commentary, Balagueró and Plaza said they aimed for the infected to appear sweat-soaked and feverish, using heavy glycerin to give performers a glossy "wet" sheen. They also said the Medeiros make-up was prepared separately so the leads would not see the design before the reveal, and that the night-vision shoot heightened the cast's reactions because they could not see in the dark.

== Release ==
The film premiered in August 2007 at the 64th Venice International Film Festival, out of competition, in the opening and closing films sessions. It was also shown in October 2007 at the Sitges Film Festival and the Málaga International Week of Fantastic Cinema in November 2007, before going on general release in Spain later that month.

The film was also shown in February 2008 at the Glasgow Film Festival and the co-directors participated in a corresponding interview in which they revealed their influences during the creation of the cinema work: "Our main reference was TV; was not other films, or a tradition of previous features. I think the main influence for us was TV. What we wanted was to build a classic horror story, but telling it in the way of a TV show." REC was then released in the United Kingdom in April 2008 and a North American DVD release occurred in 2009.

== Reception ==
=== Critical response ===
On review aggregation website Rotten Tomatoes it has an approval rating of 90% based on 42 reviews. The site's consensus reads: "Plunging viewers into the nightmarish hellscape of an apartment complex under siege, [Rec] proves that found footage can still be used as an effective delivery mechanism for sparse, economic horror." Metacritic, which uses a weighted average, assigned the film a score of 71 out of 100, based on 10 critics, indicating "generally favorable" reviews.

Reviewing the film for the BBC, Jamie Russell called it "A runaway rollercoaster of a fright flick", praising the "faux-docu handheld style" and the sense of claustrophobia and confusion, though he criticised the lack of substance and a "one-dimensional" supporting cast. Bloody Disgusting awarded the film four-and-a-half stars out of five, writing that "[REC] has it all and is probably one of the best Spanish horror films in recent memory."

=== Accolades ===
The film has appeared on retrospective lists of 2000s horror, including Time Out's list of the 100 best horror films and Entertainment Weekly's list of the 25 best horror movies that defined the 2000s.

Year	Award	Category	Result	Ref.
2007	Festival de Cine de Sitges	Best Director	Won	
2007	Festival de Cine de Sitges	Best Actress (Manuela Velasco)	Won	
2007	Festival de Cine de Sitges	Audience Award (El Periódico de Catalunya – Best Motion Picture)	Won	
2007	Festival de Cine de Sitges	Jose Luis Guarner Critic Award	Won	
2007	Festival de Cine de Sitges	Grand Prize of European Fantasy Film in Silver – Special Mention	Won	
2008	Goya Awards (22nd)	Best New Actress (Manuela Velasco)	Won	
2008	Goya Awards (22nd)	Best Editing (David Gallart)	Won	
2008	Goya Awards (22nd)	Best Special Effects (David Ambid; Enric Masip; Álex Villagrasa)	Nominated	
2008	Fantasporto	Grand Prix Fantasporto	Won	
2008	Fantasporto	Audience Jury Award	Won	
2008	Fantastic'Arts	Special Jury Prize	Won	
2008	Fantastic'Arts	Youth Jury Grand Prize	Won	
2008	Fantastic'Arts	Audience Award	Won	
2008	Amsterdam Fantastic Film Festival	Silver Scream Award	Won	
2008	Cinema Writers Circle Awards, Spain	CEC Award – Best Editing	Nominated	
2008	Cinema Writers Circle Awards, Spain	CEC Award – Best New Artist	Nominated	
2008	European Film Awards	Audience Award – Best Film	Nominated	
2008	Fant-Asia Film Festival	Best European/North – South American Film	2nd place	
2008	Fant-Asia Film Festival	Fantasia Ground-Breaker Award – Best Film	2nd place	
2009	Reaper Award	Best Indie/Foreign production	Won	

== Franchise ==
=== Sequels ===
The Spanish Rec series continued with Rec 2 (2009), which begins immediately after the ending of the first film and again credits Jaume Balagueró and Paco Plaza as directors. Manuela Velasco reprises her role as Ángela Vidal in Rec 2 and Rec 4: Apocalypse. The third entry, Rec 3: Genesis (2012), was directed by Plaza, while the fourth film, Rec 4: Apocalypse (2014), was directed by Balagueró.

=== Remake series ===
An American remake, Quarantine (2008), was also released, followed by Quarantine 2: Terminal (2011).

== Works cited ==
- Balagueró, Jaume; Plaza, Paco (2021). [•REC] (archive audio commentary) (Blu-ray bonus feature (audio commentary)). Arrow Video.
- Balagueró, Jaume; Plaza, Paco (2021). Interview with Jaume Balagueró and Paco Plaza (archive) (Blu-ray bonus feature (interview)). Arrow Video.
- Rosso, Pablo (2021). Interview with Pablo Rosso (archive) (Blu-ray bonus feature (interview)). Arrow Video.
- Mas, Xavi (2021). Interview with Xavi Mas (archive) (Blu-ray bonus feature (interview)). Arrow Video.
- Tarragó, Oriol (2021). Interview with Oriol Tarragó (archive) (Blu-ray bonus feature (interview)). Arrow Video.
- Velasco, Manuela (2021). Confidences, a video diary by star Manuela Velasco (archive) (Blu-ray bonus feature (video diary)). Arrow Video.
