= Rec 4: Apocalypse =

2014 film by Jaume Balagueró

- US Theatrical release poster
- Directed by: Jaume Balagueró
- Written by: Jaume Balagueró; Manu Diez
- Produced by: Julio Fernández
- Starring: Manuela Velasco; Paco Manzanedo; Héctor Colomé; Ismael Fritschi; Críspulo Cabezas; Mariano Venancio; María Alfonsa Rosso; Carlos Zabala; Cristian Aquino; Emilio Buale; Paco Obregón; Javier Laorden
- Cinematography: Pablo Rosso
- Edited by: Guillermo de la Cal
- Music by: Arnau Bataller
- Production companies: Canal+ España; Castelao Productions
- Distributed by: Filmax
- Release dates: 9 September 2014 (TIFF); 31 October 2014
- Running time: 95 minutes
- Country: Spain
- Language: Spanish
- Box office: $4.9 million

Rec 4: Apocalypse (stylized as [•REC]⁴; subtitled in some countries as Apocalypse) is a 2014 Spanish action horror film, and the fourth and final installment of the Rec film series. The film is a direct sequel to Rec 2, taking place immediately after the events of the second film. Jaume Balagueró, the director of the first two installments, returns alongside actress Manuela Velasco, who reprises her role of the imperiled reporter Ángela Vidal. The film premiered at the Toronto International Film Festival on 9 September 2014 and screened at the 2014 Sitges Film Festival on 3 October, before being released in Spain on 31 October.

The film was released in the United States by Magnet Releasing on 2 January 2015, both theatrically and on VOD.

== Plot ==
A Special Forces Team is sent to an apartment complex to rescue a reporter named Ángela and destroy the building. Following an attack by infected firefighters and residents, the team's survivors, Lucas and Guzman, complete the assignment. Ángela awakens on a ship, chained to a bed and remembering nothing. Dr. Ginard takes a sample of Ángela's blood for testing. Lucas and Guzman are also on board the vessel, which has been effectively quarantined by its isolation. After a failed escape attempt, Ángela is informed by Dr. Ricarte that she is not infected. Meanwhile, Guzman makes acquaintances with the ship's captain Ortega and the technician Nic, who reconstructs the events within the apartment complex with the aid of Ángela's camera. Nic sends the film to the doctors in their laboratory, where they begin experimentation with the pathogen.

The doctors discover that their test subject, an infected monkey, has been released during a power outage the previous night. The monkey infects the ship's cook, who in turn contaminates the food. Ingestion infects the majority of the crew and guards. After an unsuccessful attempt by the doctors to cure the cook with an antidote, Ángela, Guzman, Lucas, and an elderly woman who survived an outbreak at a wedding make for the bridge. On the way, the elderly woman is separated from the group and Lucas stays behind to rescue her, only to find her infected which forces him to shoot her down. Ricarte recognizes that the attempt to find an antidote has failed because it requires an unmutated strain of the pathogen. Shortly before he can initiate a self-destruct sequence, his assistant informs him of the reconstructed film, which shows Ángela being orally infected with a worm-like parasite by the pathogen's original carrier. Ricarte attempts to extract the parasite by forcing surgery on Ángela when an attack by the now-infected Goro allows her escape. Ricarte searches for Ángela, who ambushes and bites him. Despite a scan of his blood reading negative, Ricarte is convinced that Ángela is tricking him. It is revealed that during Ángela's rescue the parasite transferred to Guzman. Guzman traps Ángela within the ship's bowels as Ricarte launches the ship's self-destruct sequence.

Lucas and Nic try and fail to start the ship's auxiliary engine, and Lucas is killed by the infected. Nic finds Ricarte planning to flee in a lifeboat. Nic knocks Ricarte out, takes the lifeboat for himself, and searches for Ángela. Nic finds her on the run from infected monkeys, which they manage to kill with an outboard motor. They are then attacked by Guzman who attempts to transfer the parasite back into Ángela. As he almost succeeds, Nic and Ángela kill Guzman with a harpoon gun. The two leave the boat as all the infected chase after them. They jump into the ocean as the ship explodes. Underwater, the parasite is swallowed by a fish.

Finally, Ángela and Nic are shown in a cab as driver jokes about the wild party they just came from.

== Cast ==
- Manuela Velasco as Ángela Vidal
- Paco Manzanedo as Guzmán
- Héctor Colomé as Dr. Ricarte
- Ismael Fritschi as Nic
- Críspulo Cabezas as Lucas
- Paco Obregón as Dr. Ginard
- Mariano Venancio as Captain Ortega
- María Alfonsa Rosso as Anciana
- Cristian Aquino as Edwin (the cook)
- Carlos Zabala as Goro
- Emilio Buale as Jesu
- Javier Laorden as Médico Auxiliar

== Production ==
On 3 May 2010, Bloody Disgusting announced that "...Filmax will produce two new [REC] films in the next couple of years called [REC] 3: Genesis and [REC] 4: Apocalypse with the same directors as the first two films". Genesis was released on 30 March 2012. It was directed by the co-founder of the REC franchises, Jaume Balagueró, who co-wrote the script along Manu Diez. Carlos Fernández, Julio Fernández and Alberto Marini returned 4th time as executive producers.

In an interview with Fangoria, director Balagueró stated that the film would not have an apocalyptic style presumed by its title, stating, "All of the movies in the [REC] series have the same budget, so you’re not really going to see big scenes of Barcelona full of zombies; they’re just not intended that way. There has to be a story that’s controlled and strong." Apocalypse is set to follow the events of the second film, and will not be made in the "found footage" style. Production was scheduled to begin in 2013. At the 2012 Sitges Film Festival, it was announced the film would have its world premiere there in October 2013. An announcement trailer was released in late November, confirming the return of Manuela Velasco.

However, in early May 2013, Balagueró stated that the film's production had been delayed and the film would now premiere sometime in mid-2014, but did confirm that Manuela Velasco would be starring in the fourth film. Teaser posters and an updated premise were released early May. Filming began on 13 July 2013 in Gran Canaria, aboard a Russian merchant navy ship. A theatrical trailer for the film was released in April 2014.

== Release ==
The film premiered on 9 September 2014 on the Toronto International Film Festival and screened on Sitges Film Festival on 3 October 2014. Entertainment One released the film 2 March 2015 on Blu-ray and DVD, the Blu-disc featured the Making-of feature "The Making of [REC] Apocalypse" in the United Kingdom. Sony Pictures Home Entertainment released the film on 14 April 2015 in the United States, as direct to video production.

== Reception ==
=== Critical response ===
The film received mixed-to-positive reviews, with some praising the return of Manuela Velasco. Spanish website ALT104 claimed that the film proves to be a worthy sequel to the franchise, but a weak way to end the series.

On the review aggregation website Rotten Tomatoes the film has a 68% approval rating with an average rating of 5.33/10, based on 22 reviews. The site's critics consensus reads, "After a lackluster third entry, [REC] 4 gets the series back on track, at least to the level of the first sequel." On Metacritic the film has a score of 53% based on reviews from 5 critics, indicating "mixed or average" reviews.

=== Accolades ===
Year	Award	Category	Nominee(s)	Result	Ref.
2015	24th Actors and Actresses Union Awards	Best Film Actress in a Leading Role	Manuela Velasco	Nominated	
2015	24th Actors and Actresses Union Awards	Best Film Actor in a Secondary Role	Críspulo Cabezas	Nominated	

== Soundtrack ==
REC 4

Film score by Arnau Bataller
- Released: 28 October 2014
- Genres: Soundtracks; Film scores
- Length: 44:05
- Label: Screamworks Records

The score soundtrack was composed by Arnau Bataller.

1. "Countdown" (2:17)
2. "Inside the House" (3:50)
3. "The Medeiros Girl" (3:08)
4. "First Attack" (2:20)
5. "Security Gates" (2:24)
6. "The Infection, Pt. 1" (2:50)
7. "Fighting" (3:45)
8. "Recovering the Tape" (2:00)
9. "The Infection, Pt.2" (3:13)
10. "Nic the Hero" (3:36)
11. "It's a Parasite" (4:57)
12. "Angela's Show" (5:36)
13. "Escaping" (2:25)
14. "Nic the Hero (Reprise)" (1:44)

== Companion book ==
REC: El Libro Oficial is a companion book to the films, which contains several behind-the-scenes pictures, storyboards, and production stills. The book also offers some insight into the series' overall mythology and addresses questions left unanswered by the films. It was released in Spain in October 2014.

== See also ==
- List of Spanish films of 2014
