= Fragile (film) =

- Theatrical poster
- Spanish: Frágiles
- Directed by: Jaume Balagueró
- Written by: Jaume Balagueró; Jordi Galcerán
- Produced by: Massimo Vigliar; Julio Fernández; Joan Ginard
- Starring: Calista Flockhart; Richard Roxburgh; Elena Anaya; Gemma Jones; Yasmin Murphy; Colin McFarlane
- Cinematography: Xavi Gimenez
- Edited by: Jaume Marti
- Music by: Roque Baños
- Production company: Filmax
- Release date: 14 October 2005 (Spain)
- Running time: 93 minutes
- Countries: Spain; United Kingdom
- Language: English
- Budget: $7 million
- Box office: $6.8 million

Fragile (Spanish: Frágiles) is a 2005 Spanish-British horror film directed by Jaume Balagueró.

== Plot ==
On the Isle of Wight, a train accident on the Island Line means that the main hospital, St. James's, is completely full and unable to take in any more patients. A smaller and older hospital, Mercy Falls, is to be decommissioned, but some of the patients, including those at the hospital's pediatric ward, need to remain at Mercy Falls until there is availability elsewhere. One of the children, Maggie, an orphan suffering from severe cystic fibrosis, tells the night nurse, Susan, that "she" is coming, unnerving her. Another child at the ward, Simon, wakes up with a horrible pain in his leg. He is taken to receive an x-ray, where it is found that his femur has been broken. A doctor asks him how the injury happened, but Simon has no idea.

Susan leaves the hospital on sick leave and Amy Nicholls replaces her. Amy bonds with Maggie as both are orphans. Maggie explains to Amy that there is a girl called Charlotte who lives in an abandoned ward on a higher floor. Roy, the operations manager, explains to Amy that Charlotte is an urban legend, seen by several children who were patients at the hospital for over the last two decades. Simon later tells Amy that Charlotte is the one who broke his leg. Amy visits Susan to ask why she left but learns that Susan died in an accident. She meets two local psychics, who explain that Charlotte can only be seen by those who are close to death.

Back at Mercy Falls, the children watch Sleeping Beauty, and Maggie says that true love's kiss has special power. Amy looks at the files of the other children who had mentioned Charlotte, and finds that all of them had since died; Amy realizes that Maggie must be close to death. Later, Roy is killed by Charlotte after she inflicts a serious nosebleed on the man, then violently forces him backwards through a window.

Amy goes up to the second floor through a hidden trapdoor. She finds an old photograph of a girl in a wheelchair with a nurse and a film reel which shows the girl receiving treatment for osteogenesis imperfecta, also known as "brittle bone disease." The photograph is labelled, "Charlotte and Mandy, 1959." Charlotte begins to appear in front of a metal door, taking the form of a tall, grey figure with orthotic braces on her legs. Maggie saves Amy, dropping her favorite blanket, "Mr. Sleepy" in the process. Amy and Dr. Robert view the film, and Robert explains that the disease Charlotte suffered from was a sickness that causes the patient's bones to be susceptible to fractures. Doctors had built orthotic braces for Charlotte to wear, in the hopes of strengthening her bones. Amy now believes Charlotte is the vengeful ghost of the little girl who is hurting the children. She searches the hospital's medical records, but finds no evidence of Charlotte.

Amy finally learns why the upstairs ward is closed. The nurse caring for the little girl had become obsessed with her. When the treatments began to work and the child improved, she started purposely breaking the girl's bones and eventually murdered the child. She then put on the child's braces and committed suicide by jumping down an elevator shaft. Robert shows Amy a file he found which proves that "Mandy" is the child's name and "Charlotte" is in fact, the obsessed nurse. Amy realizes Charlotte wants to harm the children.

The hospital begins to be torn apart by Charlotte's paranormal psychic powers as the staff desperately try to evacuate the children, assisted by additional staff from St. James's. As the evacuation takes place, Amy realises that everything has suddenly become eerily calm, and Mrs. Folder says that Maggie is missing. Amy realises that Maggie went to get her blanket, and runs to the abandoned ward to rescue her. Weak and exhausted, Maggie is in Mandy's old room. Despite Charlotte's presence, Amy determinedly picks up Maggie and tries to reach the trapdoor but Charlotte causes the floor to begin to break. Amy's leg is pierced by a piece of metal, causing her to bleed profusely. As the two escape the second floor by jumping through the trapdoor, Maggie succumbs to her illness and stops breathing. Despite Amy's desperate attempts to resuscitate her, the little girl dies in her arms. Amy then also collapses from blood loss.

Robert tries to revive her with a defibrillator, but Amy's heart stops beating. As the medical team step back, Maggie's ghost gives Amy a "pure love" kiss, and Amy comes back to life. The movie ends as Amy wakes up in a different hospital with Robert at her side. An elderly patient notices Maggie's smiling ghost sitting at Amy's bedside - staying close to who she loved best in life.

== Cast ==
- Calista Flockhart as Amy Nicholls
- Richard Roxburgh as Robert Marcus
- Elena Anaya as Helen Perez
- Gemma Jones as Mrs./Dr. Folder
- Yasmin Murphy as Maggie Reynolds
- Colin McFarlane as Roy
- Michael Pennington as Marcus
- Daniel Ortiz as Matt
- Susie Trayling as Susan
- Karmeta Cervera/ Julieta Marocco as Charlotte Rivers
- Ivana Baquero as Mandy Phillips

== Production ==
Fragile was filmed between Barcelona, Spain and the Isle of Wight, England, with locations including Ryde, Ryde Pier, the Military Road, and aboard the Red Osprey. The exterior scenes of the hospital were filmed at Bearwood House in Berkshire, England.

The Sleeping Beauty animation short seen on the projector was created specifically for this movie.

== Release ==
The film premiered on 2 September 2005 as part of the Venice Film Festival and was released in a theatrical release in Spain on 14 October 2005. The movie has had several release dates around the world since its original release in October 2005. Lightning Media released the film in July 2010 via DVD, Video on Demand and Digital Download. Fragile is also part of the Fangoria FrightFest 2010 on 21 June 2010.

== See also ==
- List of Spanish films of 2005
- List of British films of 2005
- List of ghost films
