= Paco Plaza =

Spanish film director (born 1973)

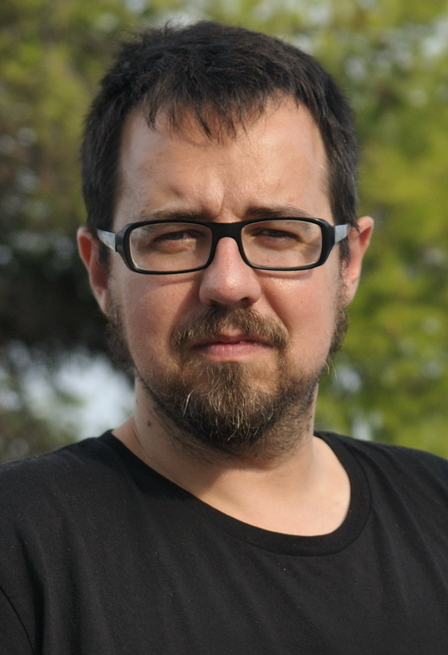
- At the 2009 Venice Film Festival
- Born: Francisco Plaza Trinidad; 8 February 1973 (age 53); Valencia, Spain
- Education: CEU Cardinal Herrera University
- Occupations: Film director; screenwriter; producer

Francisco Plaza Trinidad (born 8 February 1973), simply known as Paco Plaza, is a Spanish film director known for his works in the horror genre. He is the co-creator of the REC demon possession film franchise (commonly referred to as a zombie franchise).

== Early life and education ==
Plaza was born on 8 February 1973 in Valencia. He has a degree in Audiovisual Communication from CEU Cardinal Herrera University and a diploma in film direction from the ECAM. He speaks Spanish, English and French.

== Career ==
Although he is best known as a director, he is also a screenwriter, producer, editor and even was a costume designer on one occasion for Tropismos (1995), his first short film and with which he made his debut as a director.

Plaza is known in Spanish cinema and abroad for the creation of the trilogy REC (2007). A year after the release of the first film, American director John Erick Dowdle made an adaptation of the Paco Plaza film, under the name of Quarantine (2008). The trilogy REC has accumulated a total of 26 awards and 17 nominations in numerous film festivals.

On 23 July 2025, Variety revealed that Plaza was among the filmmakers who directed a segment for V/H/S/Halloween, Shudder's 8th instalment in their horror anthology V/H/S franchise. The film was released in October 2025.

== Filmography ==
=== Film ===
Year	Title	Director	Writer	Notes
2002	Second Name	Yes	Yes	
2002	OT: La película	Yes	No	Documentary; Co-directed with Jaume Balaguero
2004	Romasanta	Yes	No	
2007	REC	Yes	Yes	Co-directed with Jaume Balaguero
2009	REC 2	Yes	Yes	Co-directed with Jaume Balaguero
2010	Bunbury 3D	Yes	No	Enrique Bunbury concert film
2012	REC 3: Genesis	Yes	Yes	
2017	Verónica	Yes	Yes	Also associate producer
2019	Quien a hierro mata	Yes	No	IMDb
2021	La abuela	Yes	No	
2023	Hermana Muerte	Yes	Yes	
2025	V/H/S/Halloween	Yes	Yes	Segment: "Ut Supra Sic Infra"

==== As actor ====
Year	Title	Role
1996	Adosados	Marido
2009	REC 2	Zombie
2009	Spanish Movie	Municipal
2020	La Suite Nupcial	Cameo Camarero
2023	Saben aquell	Chicho Ibáñez Serrador

==== Producer only ====
Year	Title	Notes
2014	REC 4: Apocalypse	Creative producer
2015	Requirements to Be a Normal Person	Producer and executive producer

=== Short film ===
Year	Title	Director	Writer	Producer	Notes
1995	Tropismos	Yes	Yes	Yes	Also editor and costume designer
1997	Tarzán en el Café Lisboa	Yes	Yes	Yes	Also editor
1999	Abuelitos	Yes	No	No	
2001	Puzzles	Yes	No	No	
2007	Sr. Rosso	No	No	Yes	
2009	Lo siento, te quiero	No	No	Yes	
2010	Luna de miele, Luna di sangue VII	Yes	Yes	No	
2013	Habitantes	No	No	Yes	
2014	Ultravioleta	Yes	Yes	No	Advertising short Also additional still photographer
2020	D.E.V.:Disfrute en Vida	Yes	No	No	Advertising short Co-directed with Daniel Sánchez Arévalo

=== Television ===
Year	Title	Director	Writer	Notes
2005	Cuento de Navidad	Yes	No	TV movie
2016	El Ministerio del Tiempo	Yes	No	Episode: "Tiempo de magia"
2021	Historias para no dormir	Yes	Yes	Episode: "Freddy"

==== As himself ====
Year	Title	Role	Notes
2023	Drag Race España	Guest judge	Episode: "Secuelas de terror drag"

==== As actor ====
Year	Title	Role	Notes
1990	La Forja de un Rebelde	Extra	TV series 1 episode
1990	Eva y Adan: Agencia Matrimonial	Policia	TV series 1 episode
2002	Cuentame	Policía Gris	TV series 1 episode
