= Jaume Balagueró =

Spanish film director

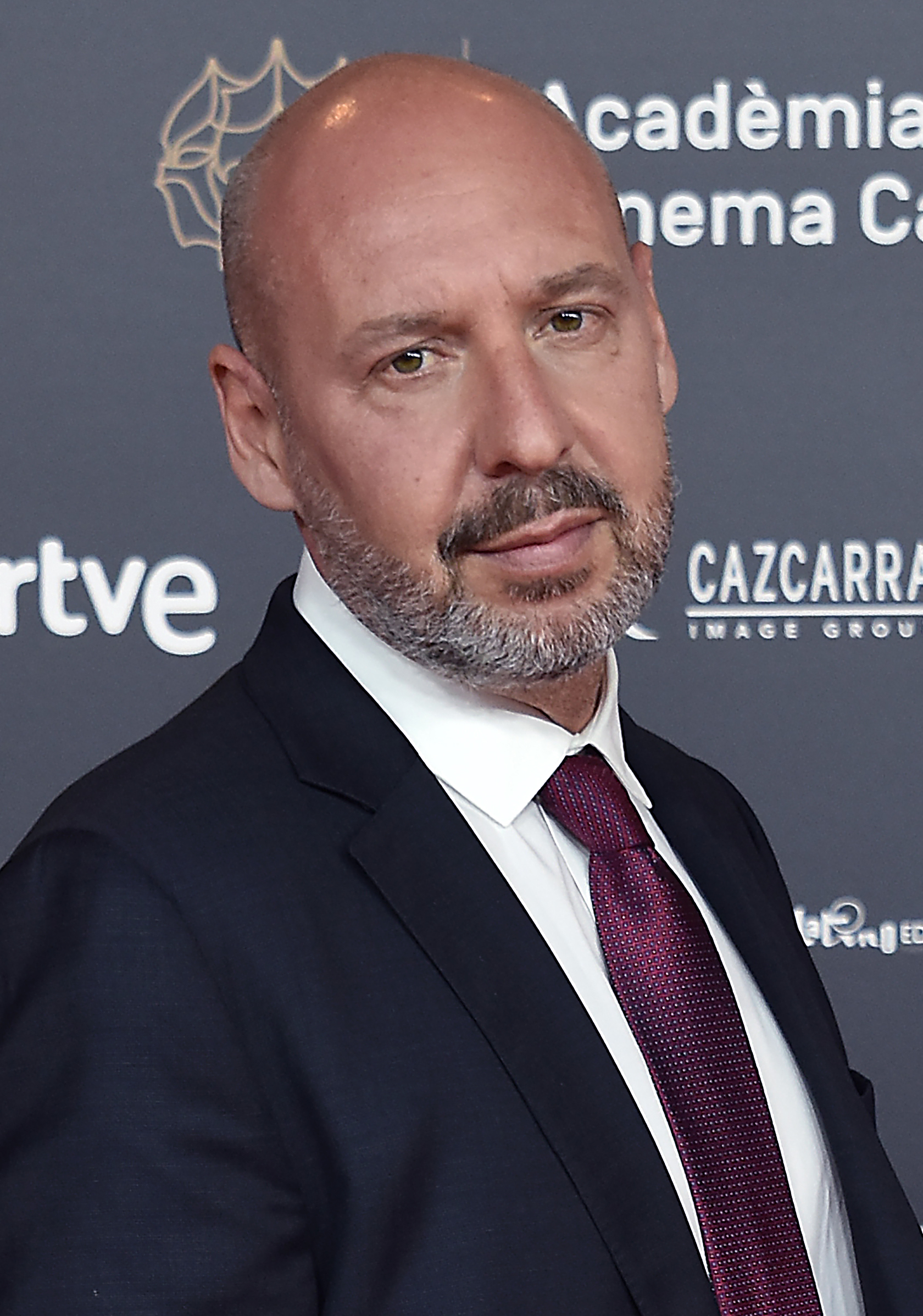
- Balagueró at the Gaudí Awards in 2021
- Born: Jaume Balagueró Bernat; 2 November 1968 (age 57); Lleida, Catalonia, Spain
- Occupations: Film director, screenwriter

Jaume Balagueró Bernat (Catalan pronunciation: [ˈʒawmə bələɣəˈɾo bəɾˈnat]; born 2 November 1968) is a Spanish film director and screenwriter known for his horror films, most notably the acclaimed REC series.

== Early life ==
Balagueró was born in Lleida and grew up in Barcelona. He studied communications and photography at the University of Barcelona, graduating in 1991 with a degree in communication sciences. In 1992, Balagueró began work as a film journalist and radio host with the show “La espuma de los días” on Radio Hospitalet.

== Career ==
In 1994, Balagueró graduated to shooting on 35mm with the short film Alicia (1994). The film won the prize for Best Short film at the Sitges Film Festival. Balagueró returned with the short Days without Light (1995), which achieved similar success on the festival circuit.

Balagueró made his feature-length film debut with The Nameless (1999). Based on the novel by Ramsey Campbell, the film appeared at festivals worldwide, winning several awards including Best Film at the Fant-Asia Film Festival. He returned three years later with the supernatural horror film Darkness (2002). The film marked Balagueró's English-language debut, and was picked up by Miramax Studios, which released a heavily truncated version in U.S. theaters in December 2004. 2005 saw the release of Balagueró's third film, the ghost story Fragile (2005), starring Calista Flockhart and Richard Roxburgh. Also in 2002, Balagueró co-directed the rock music documentary OT: la película (2002).

In 2006, Balagueró participated in the TV project Películas para no dormir (6 Films to Keep You Awake), directing the fourth film in the series To Let, with Nuria González. A revival of Narciso Ibañez Serrador's macabre TV series Historias Para No Dormir (a.k.a. Tales to Keep You Awake, 1966–67 with a brief resurrection in 1982), Películas consisted of six horror-themed episodes directed by several notable horror directors from Catalonia and other parts of Spain, including Álex de la Iglesia and Mateo Gil. Balagueró began work on REC (2007), his fourth theatrical feature, in early 2007 and planned his third movie of the REC franchise. He directed the thriller film Sleep Tight, which stars Luis Tosar. Balagueró directed REC 4: Apocalypse and co-wrote along Manu Díez the screenplay, of the film. He also wrote the screenbook of REC 3: Genesis.

== Filmography ==
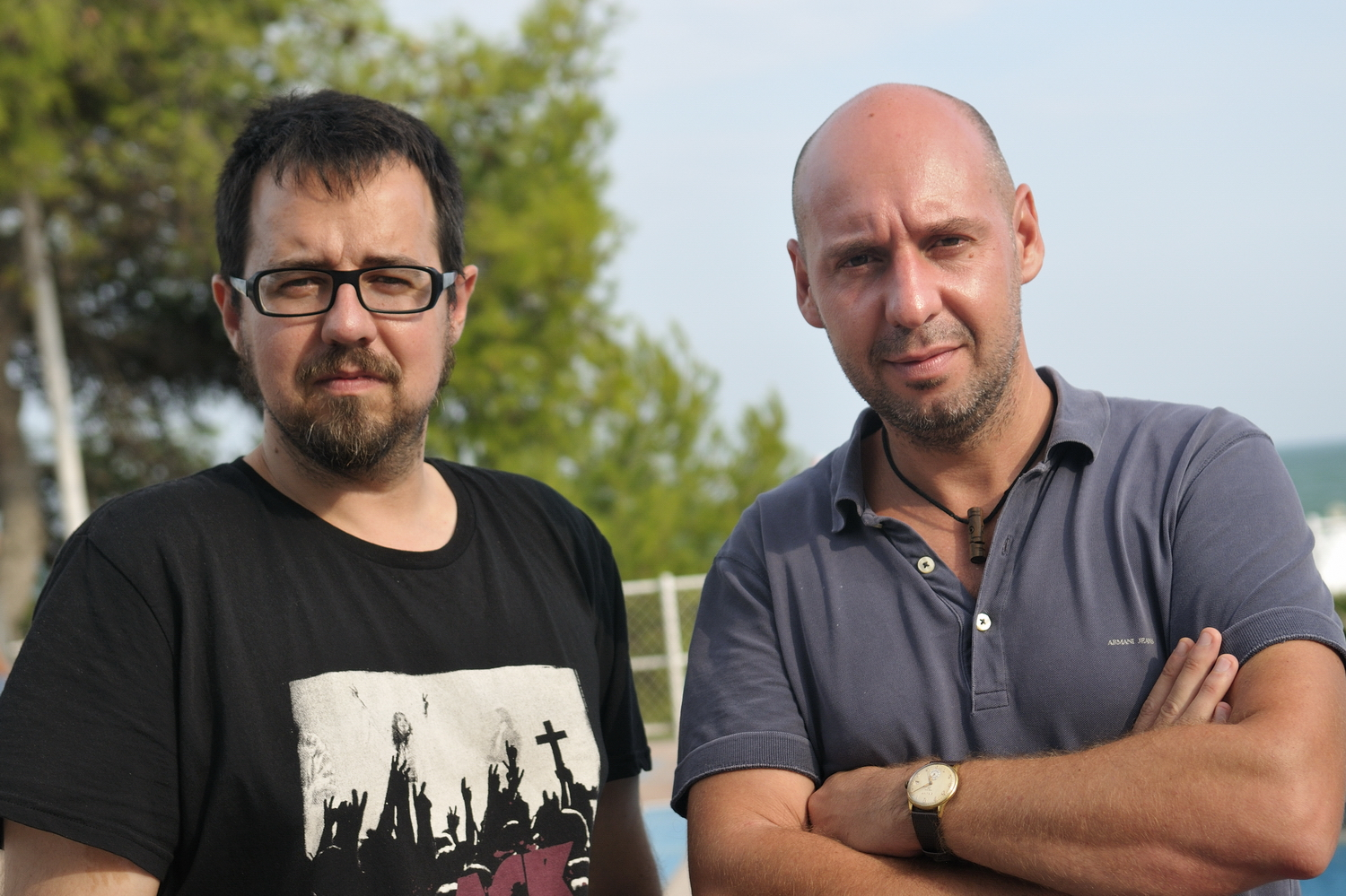
Balagueró (right) and Paco Plaza at the 2009 Venice Film Festival

=== Film ===
| Year | Title | Director | Writer | Notes |
|---|---|---|---|---|
| 1999 | The Nameless | Yes | Yes | Also associate producer |
| 2002 | O.T: La Película | Yes | No | Documentary film Co-directed with Paco Plaza |
| 2002 | Darkness | Yes | Yes | |
| 2005 | Fragile | Yes | No | |
| 2007 | REC | Yes | Yes | Co-directed with Paco Plaza |
| 2009 | REC 2 | Yes | Yes | Co-directed with Paco Plaza |
| 2011 | Sleep Tight | Yes | No | |
| 2014 | REC 4: Apocalypse | Yes | Yes | |
| 2016 | Inside | No | Yes | |
| 2017 | Muse | Yes | Yes | |
| 2021 | The Vault | Yes | No | |
| 2022 | Venus | Yes | Yes | |

==== Producer only ====
| Year | Title | Notes |
|---|---|---|
| 2012 | REC 3: Genesis | Creative producer |
| 2015 | Summer Camp | Executive producer |

=== Short film ===
| Year | Title | Director | Writer | Notes |
|---|---|---|---|---|
| 1994 | Alícia | Yes | Yes | |
| 1995 | Días sin luz | Yes | Yes | Also editor |
| 2010 | Fear | Yes | Yes | |
| 2007 | Sr. Rosso | Yes | No | Also producer |
| 2014 | Inquilinos | Yes | Yes | |
| 2021 | Unboxing Ibai | Yes | Yes | |

=== Televisión ===
| Year | Title | Director | Writer | Notes |
|---|---|---|---|---|
| 1997 | Novía Ficció | Yes | Yes | Episode "La Ciutat de la Sort" |
| 2006 | To Let | Yes | Yes | TV movie |
| 2011 | Slavados | Yes | No | Episode Short film director |
| 2022 | Historias para no dormir | Yes | No | Episode "El Telvisor" |

== Awards ==
- 2007 – Best director in the Festival de Cinema Fantàstic de Sitges for REC.
- 1999 – Best European film in the Festival de Cinema Fantàstic de Sitges for The Nameless.
- 1994 – Best shortcut in the Festival de Cinema Fantàstic de Sitges for Alicia.
