= Reisender Krieger =

- Based on: Odyssey by Homer
- Written by: Christian Schocher
- Directed by: Christian Schocher
- Starring: Willy Ziegler; Jürgen Zöller; various amateur actors
- Music by: Scharlatan Quintett
- Countries of origin: Switzerland; Germany
- Original language: Swiss German

Production
- Producer: Christian Schocher
- Cinematography: Clemens Klopfenstein
- Editors: Christian Schocher; Franz Rickenbach
- Running time: 195 minutes
- Production companies: Filmkollektiv Zürich; Schweizer Fernsehen; Federal Department of Home Affairs; ZDF

Original release
- Network: ZDF
- Release: 6 August 1981

Reisender Krieger is a Swiss film by Christian Schocher. The film depicts a week in the life of a travelling cosmetics salesman, inspired by Homer's Odyssey and the novel Ulysses by James Joyce. A road movie with amateur actors, it was aired in 1981 in television and premiered in cinema in early 1982.

== Plot ==
This plot description follows the director's cut of 2008.

On a grey autumn morning, a middle-aged man named Krieger leaves his Swiss Plattenbau home in a housing estate called Wohninsel Webermühle, driving a Citroën CX. Krieger visits beauty and hair salons, trying to sell products of the Blue Eye label, especially the Blue Dream Eau de Cologne, advertising with the slogan "That's how this winter smells in Switzerland" (in Swiss German: "Eso schmeckts dä Winter i dr Schwyz"). He isn't very successful. His route leads him to Basel via Olten. In Basel, Krieger visits the autumn fair (Basler Herbstmesse) after having phoned his wife from the hotel room. He drinks in a bar and in a dance hall, though rather observing the night life surrounding him than taking an active part in it.

The following day Krieger drives on, into the Swiss Alps. He takes along another salesman who had his driving licence suspended. Krieger mentions to him that he was a member of the French Foreign Legion. After visiting a hair salon in a Graubünden tourist village (the woman in charge mentions that Blue Eye's eye shadow doesn't sell well), they go to a local evening event with dance music.

Krieger's morning shower and shave are shown extensively. He then travels without the other salesman, and now takes along a hippie sporting a full beard and felt hat. At first quiet, his new travel companion soon makes homosexual advances, but is refused by Krieger who says that he's content with his wife. Finally, Krieger throws him out of the car. After a drive through Lucerne, Krieger talks with the female owner of a hair salon. The hairdresser, talking in Basel German and smoking a lot, asks Krieger about his life and his relationship to his wife while they drink champagne. She berates Krieger for spending his time in bars and driving. According to her, Krieger is always tired when he visits her and looks in need of a hair wash - "you want to sell me something, but I'd have something much better for you". Krieger fears for his job and stresses that he has to provide for his wife - to which the hairdresser responds asking him whether he thinks that leaving his wife alone in a tower block means providing for her. And for the rest, the hairdresser professes, she's fed up with the "arsehole-ness" ("Arschlochigkeit") of the world in general. - After leaving her, Krieger wanders aimlessly around the city streets at night-time.

Another day. Krieger sleeps in his car on the side of a mountain road. A young woman walks by, he notices her and offers her a lift to Tenna. Krieger is allowed to stay overnight on her parents' farm. The four of them eat "Gschwellti" (potatoes boiled in their jacket) and conduct a faltering conversation. The father is rather suspicious of Krieger and asks the daughter - in Krieger's presence - where she has "picked up that one". Krieger gives her a flask of perfume.

Krieger drives to Zürich, visiting Blue Eye's office. Apparently he's looking for someone or something there, opening various doors on the floor. As Krieger argues with an employee on the floor, a big Blue Eye logo painted on a glass pane is carried to another room, followed by a photographer and female models. - Krieger goes out, into the Zürich nightlife. At a bar, a middle-aged woman offers him sex; it remains unclear whether he accepts, but in the next scene, he sits alone, smoking and drinking before a stage where an Asian female singer performs Strangers in the Night. - Another bar, Krieger smokes and drinks. A young man in a leather jacket comes in, takes a seat at a table, and starts drumming fast rhythms with his hands and feet. Krieger pays and leaves, only to notice at another bar that the young guy is there again. - Krieger dances in a disco. The drummer is also there and accompanies the rhythm with a whistle. Krieger and the drummer - his name is Jürgen - start to hit the nightlife together and become friends. In the early morning, they drunkenly talk in the Shopville subterranean shopping mall under Zürich Main Station, telling of their lives. Jürgen mentions that his deaf stepfather had no understanding of music at all.

At the Blue Eye office, Krieger throws an empty bottle at the building. He gives Jürgen the key to the car and says "Bring me home, boy". On the way, they sing Somebody Loves Me. The car vanishes in the underground parking of Wohninsel Webermühle.

== Background ==
Reisender Krieger was produced in the autumn of 1979, first aired on 6 August 1981 on the ZDF television channel, and premiered in cinema on 12 March 1982. Shot in black and white on 16 mm film, the original cut had a length of 195 minutes. Schocher's director's cut of 2008 is at 142 minutes considerably shorter. Schocher used amateur actors; he noticed his leading actor, Willy Ziegler, at a Stammtisch in Lucerne. According to Schocher, Ziegler "just played himself".

In an outline of 1978, Schocher described the film as a "staged documentary or a documentary feature film". While the film follows stations and themes from the Odyssey, transferring them "to our country and our civilisation", a large part also consists of documentary shoots, showing places and landscapes in German-speaking Switzerland. Reisender Krieger was filmed without written dialogue, without artificial light, and using just a hand-held camera. According to Schocher, the manifest Dogma 95 where Danish directors made similar specifications, made him laugh: "Klopfenstein and me developed this earlier, we just didn't shout it out from the rooftops".

The German title is ambiguous, as Reisender Krieger can be read as "Travelling salesman Krieger", but also as "Travelling Warrior". "Reisender" means specifically a travelling salesman as well as more generally one who travels, and "Krieger" is a family name, but also the German word for warrior.

In 2015, the director's cut was published on DVD with German, French, and English subtitles.

== Themes ==
Schocher's outline mentions various counterparts for characters from the Odyssey. For example, Kriegers wife who waits at home is Penelope, the Graubünden farmer's daughter stands for Nausicaa, her father for Alcinous - and the drummer Jürgen is Telemachus, "whom Krieger, on a booze-cruise, beholds as his own, freer mirror image, and accepts as his son for one night."

== Critical response ==
At the time of its first release, Reisender Krieger was reviewed positively in Swiss and German media. Karsten Witte wrote 1982 in the German newspaper Die Zeit of a "sneaky fascination" by the movie. At first, the viewer would ask where the journey is supposed to lead, but soon one couldn't get enough of the "richness of these images". According to Witte, Schocher is "a pioneer who invents cinema anew, one who cunningly mixes magic with myth".

Also in retrospect and after publication of the director's cut, the film received a positive response. Wolfram Knorr described it in a Weltwoche article on occasion of the 66th Locarno International Film Festival (2013) as a "masterpiece of form and fantasy about Switzerland" and as by far the best Swiss movie, which, however, didn't inspire others to follow with similar studies.

The German Lexikon des internationalen Films attests the movie to be "excellently photographed" and describes it as trying to show alienation and the inability to communicate in modern society by the example of Krieger's conduct of life. In the Lexikon Filme im Fernsehen by Adolf Heinzlmeier and Berndt Schulz, Reisender Krieger is described as a film "that precisely realizes the ambiguity of its title".
