= Erica Pedretti =

Swiss artist (1930–2022)

- Born: Erica Schefter; 25 February 1930; Šternberk, Czechoslovakia
- Died: 14 July 2022 (aged 92); Tenna, Switzerland
- Occupations: Writer, painter, sculptor

Erica Pedretti (née Schefter; 25 February 1930 – 14 July 2022) was a Swiss author and artist. Pedretti has published texts since 1970, and since 1976 she has worked as an artist, especially as a sculptor. In 1984, Pedretti received the Ingeborg Bachmann Prize for her text The model and his painter and in 1996 the Marie Luise Kaschnitz Prize for her novel Engste Heimat. She was also awarded a Swiss Literature Prize in 2013.

== Life ==
Erica Pedretti was born Erica Schefter on 25 February 1930 in Steinberg in northern Moravia, Czechoslovakia. Her mother tongue was German. Her father was a silk manufacturer, but lost the factory after the Second World War. Pedretti went to Switzerland in 1945 on a Red Cross transport, to live with her aunt in Zurich. She studied art and enjoyed a career as a writer, painter, and sculptor. For a few years Pedretti lived in the United States, where she worked as a silver and goldsmith in New York, but in 1952 she returned to Switzerland. She married the Swiss painter Gian Pedretti that same year. Pedretti began writing in 1965, and has published texts since 1970, and since 1976 she has worked as an artist, especially as a sculptor.

In 1984, Pedretti received the Ingeborg Bachmann Prize for her novel The model and his painter and in 1996 the Marie Luise Kaschnitz Prize for her novel Engste Heimat. She was awarded the Culture Prize of the Canton of Grisons in 1999. In 2013 she was awarded a Swiss Literature Prize.

Pedretti died in Tenna, Switzerland on 14 July 2022 at the age of 92.
