= Christian Schocher =

Swiss film director

Christian Schocher (born 1946) is a Swiss independent filmmaker and cinema operator best known for his monumental odyssey Reisender Krieger (Travelling salesman Krieger or Travelling Warrior, 1981).

== Life and career ==
Schocher was born in Pontresina in the Upper Engadin valley. His father was a Swiss photographer and documentary filmmaker. He attended high school in Samedan and apprenticed as a photographer in Chur. Rather than taking over his father's photographic shop, as it was expected from him, the twenty-one-year-old opted for Cinéma Rex instead, a local movie theater equally owned by his father.

For his first experimental film, self-taught Schocher set his sights on the objects of Swiss artist Corsin Fontana. His first documentary feature, entitled Die Kinder von Furna (The children of Furna, 1975) was inspired by ethnographic films such as Fredi M. Murer's mountaineer documentary. In 1979, Schocher started shooting Reisender Krieger (Traveling Warrior, 1981). He cast the film almost entirely with non-actors, including the leading part. A lot of the dialogue was improvised. It premiered at Locarno International Film Festival in 1981. His next feature Lüzzas Walkman (1989) was shot without a screenplay and with no written dialogue. Most characters were portrayed by non-actors who played themselves.

Between 1998 and 2011, Schocher made three films in the Romansh-speaking Surselva region: In Paun jester ha siat crustas (Foreign bred has seven crusts, 1998), former hotel staff remember their seasonal employment at the posh establishments of Engadin. Giuventetgna dultsch utschi (Sweet Bird of Youth, 2002) portrays six Surselva teenagers. Egliadas (Moments, 2011), is a documentary film on Swiss photographer Emil Brunner.

Besides making films, Schocher owned and operated Cinéma Rex in Pontresina. He screened popular features alongside films from the so-called Third World and curated special programs dedicated to a particular author, to the Swiss documentary genre or to Swiss filmmakers such as Daniel Schmid or Fredi M. Murer. After 45 years in operation, the cinema was shut down in 2013.

== Family ==
Christian Schocher lives in Pontresina with his wife Carina. The couple has four children. Their son Nathan acted as composer in three of Schocher's films.
