= Ricarda-Huch-Preis =

Ricarda-Huch-Preis is a literary prize of Hesse. It has been awarded by the City of Darmstadt.

== Winners ==
- 1978 Friedrich Luft
- 1981 Marcel Reich-Ranicki
- 1984 Siegfried Unseld
- 1987 Herta Müller
- 1990 Martin Walser
- 1993 Adolf Muschg
- 1996 Alexander Kluge
- 1999 Ignatz Bubis
- 2002 František Černý
- 2005 Orhan Pamuk
- 2008 Hanna Krall
- 2011 Sibylle Lewitscharoff
- 2015 Barbara Honigmann
- 2018 Ferdinand von Schirach
- 2021 Petra Reski
- 2024 Philipp Peyman Engel
