= Sibylle Lewitscharoff =

German author (1954–2023)

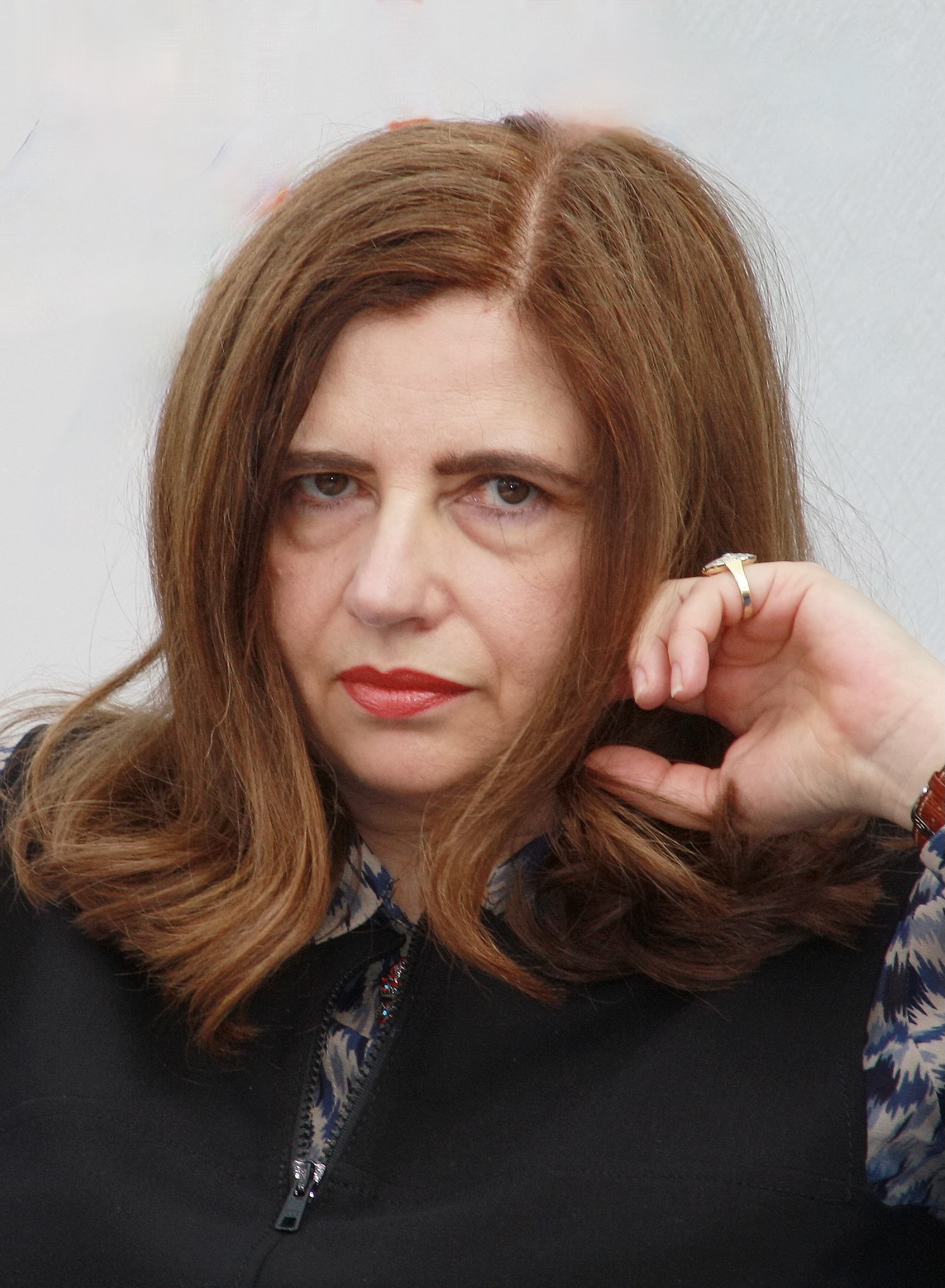
- Lewitscharoff at the 2009 Leipzig Book Fair
- Born: 16 April 1954 Stuttgart, West Germany
- Died: 13 May 2023 (aged 69) Berlin, Germany
- Occupation: Author
- Education: Free University of Berlin
- Notable awards: Ingeborg Bachmann Prize; Georg Büchner Prize

Sibylle Lewitscharoff (German: [ziˈbɪlə leviˈtʃaːʁɔf]; 16 April 1954 – 13 May 2023) was a German author. She first wrote in her spare time as a bookkeeper, quitting after her first novel, Pong, appeared in 1998. Pong was successful with critics and the public, earning her the Ingeborg Bachmann Prize. It was followed by Consummatus (2006), Apostoloff (2009) and Blumenberg (2011). She received several German literary awards, including the Georg Büchner Prize in 2013, for "[re-exploring] the boundaries of what we consider our daily reality with an inexhaustible energy of observation, narrative fantasy and linguistic inventiveness.".

== Early life ==
Lewitscharoff was born in Stuttgart. Her parents were Kristo Lewitscharoff, a gynecologist who had immigrated from Bulgaria, and Marianne, a German woman. She grew up with a brother, who went on to manage a Berlin-based advertising company that Lewitscharoff later worked under as a bookkeeper. Her father suffered from depression and committed suicide when she was eleven years old.

She obtained her Abitur from a Protestant gymnasium for girls in 1972 and then studied theology and sociology at the Free University of Berlin. She moved to Buenos Aires for an extended study trip of one year in 1977. When she returned to Berlin the following year she began work as a bookkeeper in her brother's company, a job that she kept for decades. She graduated in 1982, and studied further in Paris in 1984.

== Literary career ==
Lewitscharoff started her writing career by writing for radio, including radio plays. Her first book, 36 Gerechte, appeared in 1994.

In 1998, she published her first novel Pong. The novel is named after its main character, a man who has been interpreted by reviewers as possibly being insane, and possibly not being fully human. His name originates from his ability to bounce like a ball. He is obsessed with human perfection, especially that of women, and is portrayed as a misogynist. He meets a woman called Evmarie whom he eventually marries. He puts her on a rooftop to shelter two eggs which ultimately become a boy and a girl, who in turn have their own offspring. The book ends with Pong's joyous cry as he commits suicide by jumping from the roof. The book was praised for its playful language and earned Lewitscharoff the Ingeborg Bachmann Prize. Two years after its publication, she quit her day job and focused on writing.

Published in 2006, her novel Consummatus is named for the last saying of Jesus on the cross according to the Gospel of John, "consummatum est [it is completed]". The book follows the inner monologue of German teacher Ralph Zimmermann and as he sits alone in a Stuttgart café drinking vodka and coffee. His thoughts circle around death; of both of his parents from an accident, of his girlfriend Johanna (Joey), and of pop icons such as Andy Warhol, Jim Morrison and Edie Sedgwick.

Her 2009 novel Apostoloff is partly autobiographical, and features two sisters who go to Bulgaria to bury their Bulgarian immigrant father who had committed suicide by hanging himself, while their chauffeur tries to interest them in the nature and culture of Bulgaria. The book earned Lewitscharoff the Leipzig Book Fair Prize and the Marie Luise Kaschnitz Prize.

The novel Blumenberg was published in 2011 and features philosopher Hans Blumenberg, who in the novel finds a lion at his desk. The book subsequently focuses on Blumenberg's thoughts on lions in philosophy, history and theology. Lines are drawn to Hieronymus, Marc, Thomas Mann and other historical figures related to lions. The appearance of the lion makes Blumenberg feel selected. The novel also describes four of Blumenberg's students.

In 2013 she received the Georg Büchner Prize for "[re-exploring] the boundaries of what we consider our daily reality with an inexhaustible energy of observation, narrative fantasy and linguistic inventiveness." She was a scholar at the Villa Massimo then.

In 2014, she published her first crime novel, Killmousky. The novel is named after a black cat that arrives at the home of a retired police officer who names the cat after a similar cat in Midsomer Murders. The police officer has retired after he used violence against a suspect in a kidnapping case in order to get information to find the kidnapped. He goes on to take a position as a private detective for an upper-class New Yorker who wants a possible murder solved. The book received mostly mixed reviews.

Lewitscharoff received praise for her playful mastery of language, described by the jury of the Berlin Literature Prize in 2010 as "uncommonly dense and original prose works ... that oppose all classifications with their own peculiar amalgam of humor and profundity. ... Lewitscharoff's poetic gesture is a brilliant recitative, a virtuoso rhetoric." In 2011, she was described in Die Welt as "the most dazzling stylist of contemporary German literature."

Literature expert Ulrike Veder puts Lewitscharoff in the magical realism tradition and has further expressed on Lewitscharoff's writing that "It's the constellation of profound knowledge and a writing style that is funny and headstrong and that not only plays with language but actually enriches the language."

Invited to write about her favourite authors, she wrote the essay Der Dichter als Kind (The poet as a child), including Johann Wolfgang von Goethe, Friedrich Schiller, Gottfried Keller, Karl Philipp Moritz, Clemens Brentano and Bettina Brentano. She named Clemens Brentano her favourite.

== Dresden speech ==
On 2 March 2014, Lewitscharoff gave the traditional Dresdner Rede (Dresden Speech) at the Dresden Staatsschauspiel. In the speech "Von der Machbarkeit. Die wissenschaftliche Bestimmung über Geburt und Tod" she criticised what she considered medical mechanisation of reproduction and death. She voiced opposition to artificial insemination and surrogacy referring to the offspring through such methods as "twilight creatures", "half human, half artificial I-don't-know-whats". The speech caused discussion and criticism. Lewitscharoff later said she regretted a couple of phrases, but that her main points stood.

== Personal life ==
Lewitscharoff was married from 1990 to the artist Friedrich Meckseper. He provided illustrations to a 2013 edition of Pong. They lived in Berlin where he died in 2019. Her religious faith was shaped by her maternal grandmother, who lived with the family when she was a child. Although a Lutheran, she was influenced by the Catholic tradition on many moral issues.

Lewitscharoff was diagnosed with multiple sclerosis in 2010. She died in Berlin on 13 May 2023, at age 69.

== Awards ==
- Ingeborg Bachmann Prize (1998)
- Member of Deutsche Akademie für Sprache und Dichtung (2007)
- Ten-week London scholarship from the German Literature Fund, as Writer-in-Residence at Queen Mary University of London (2007)
- Marie Luise Kaschnitz Prize (2009)
- Leipzig Book Fair Prize (2009)
- Ricarda-Huch-Preis (2011)
- Marieluise-Fleißer-Preis (2011)
- Wilhelm Raabe Literature Prize (2011)
- Georg Büchner Prize (2013)
- Brothers Grimm Poetics Professorship at University of Kassel (2013)

== Novels ==
- 36 Gerechte. Steinrötter, Münster 1994, ISBN 3-927024-00-7.
- Pong. Berlin Verlag, Berlin 1998, ISBN 3-8270-0285-0.
- Der höfliche Harald. Berlin Verlag, Berlin 1999, ISBN 3-8270-0349-0.
- Montgomery. DVA, Stuttgart / München 2003, ISBN 978-3-421-05680-1.
- Consummatus. DVA, Stuttgart 2006, ISBN 3-421-05596-3.
- Apostoloff. Suhrkamp, Frankfurt am Main 2009, ISBN 3-518-42061-5.
- Blumenberg. Suhrkamp, Berlin 2011, ISBN 978-3-518-42244-1; als TB: Suhrkamp-Taschenbuch 4399, Berlin 2013, ISBN 978-3-518-46399-4.
- With Friedrich Meckseper: Pong redivivus. Insel, Berlin 2013, ISBN 978-3-458-19383-8.
- Killmousky. Suhrkamp, Berlin 2014, ISBN 978-3-518-42390-5.
