= Marie Luise Kaschnitz Prize =

German literary award

The Marie Luise Kaschnitz Prize (Marie Luise Kaschnitz-Preis) is a German literary prize, awarded approximately every two years by the Tutzing Protestant Academy Evangelische Akademie Tutzing. It recognizes the lifetime achievements of writers in the German language. The monetary value is €7,500.

The prize commemorates Marie Luise Kaschnitz, who died in 1974. The first award was announced on 14 October 1984.

== Recipients ==
- 1984 Ilse Aichinger
- 1986 Hanna Johansen
- 1988 Fritz Rudolf Fries
- 1990 Paul Nizon
- 1992 Gerhard Roth
- 1994 Ruth Klüger
- 1996 Erica Pedretti
- 1998 Arnold Stadler
- 2000 Wulf Kirsten
- 2002 Robert Menasse
- 2004 Julia Franck
- 2006 Pascal Mercier
- 2008 Sibylle Lewitscharoff
- 2010 Mirko Bonné
- 2012 Thomas Lehr
- 2015 Lutz Seiler
- 2017 Michael Köhlmeier
- 2019 Angelika Klüssendorf
- 2021 Iris Wolff
- 2023 Anja Kampmann
