= Tenna, Switzerland =

Tenna
- Former municipality
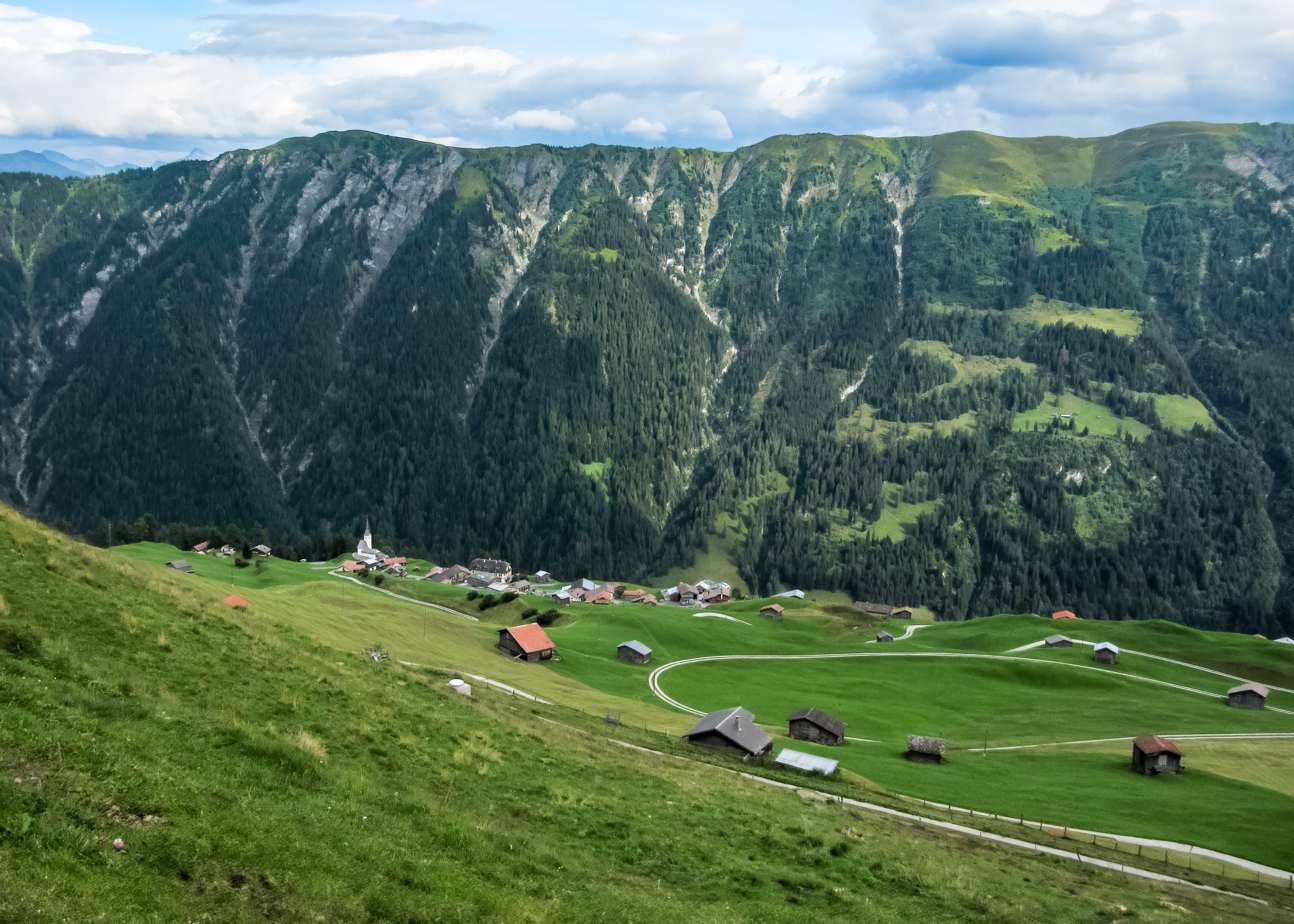
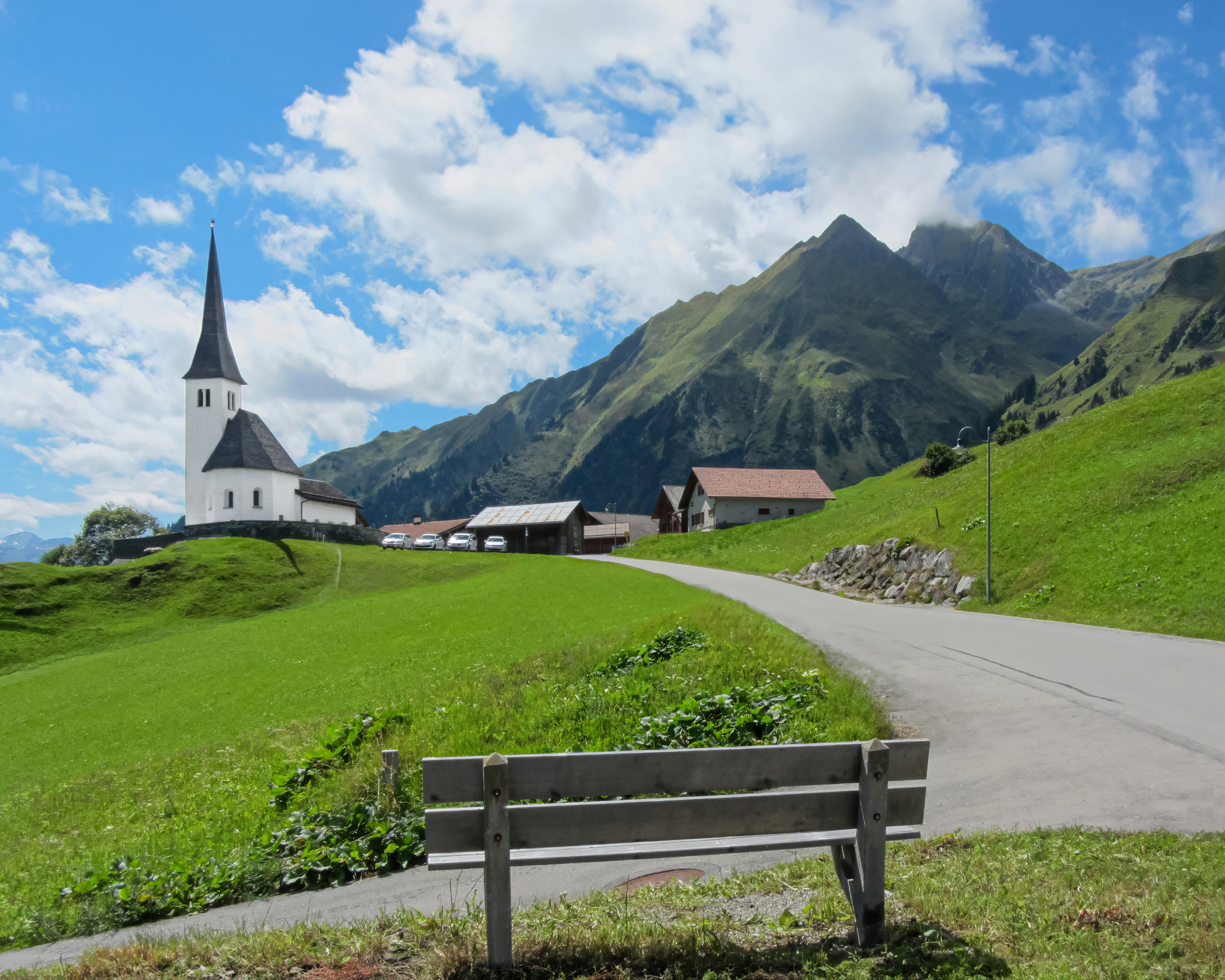
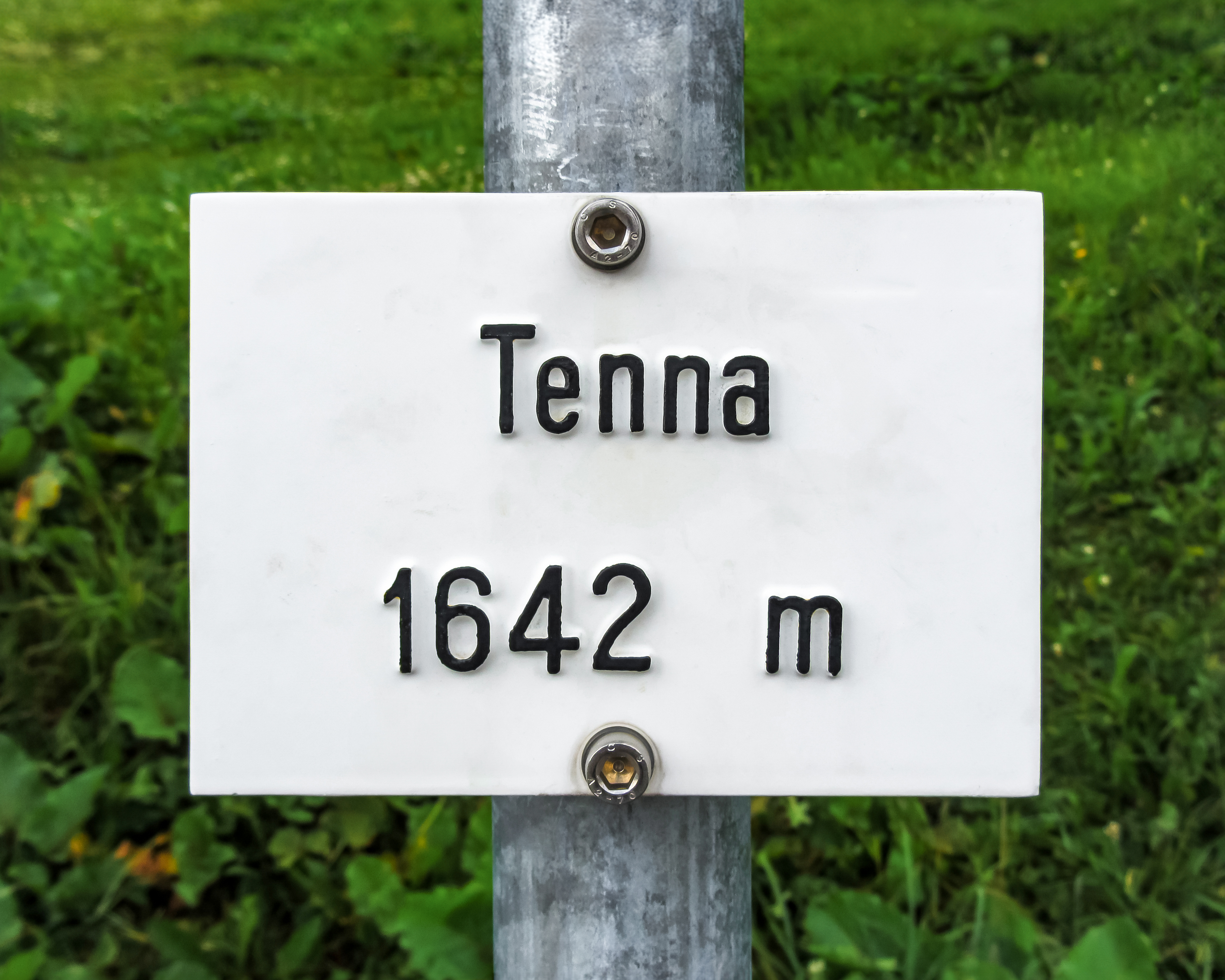

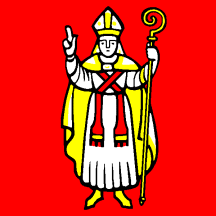
- Flag Coat of arms
- Location of Tenna
- Location within Switzerland Location within Canton of Graubünden
- Coordinates: 46°45′N 9°20′E
- Country: Switzerland
- Canton: Graubünden
- District: Surselva

Area
  - Total: 11.28 km^{2} (4.36 sq mi)
- Elevation: 1,654 m (5,427 ft)

Population (Dec 2011)
  - Total: 110
  - Density: 9.8/km^{2} (25/sq mi)
- Time zone: UTC+01:00 (CET)
  - Summer (DST): UTC+02:00 (CEST)
- Postal code: 7106
- SFOS number: 3652
- ISO 3166 code: CH-GR
- Surrounded by: Riein, Safien, Valendas, Versam
- Website: SFSO statistics

Tenna is a former municipality in the district of Surselva in the canton of Graubünden in Switzerland. The municipalities of Valendas, Versam, Safien and Tenna merged on 1 January 2013 into the new municipality of Safiental.

== History ==
Tenna is first mentioned in 1398 as Thena. The significant incidence of hemophilia in the population was documented in the mid 1800s and then later (1909) referenced by Bulloch and Fildes in "Treasury of Human Inheritance."

=== Coat of arms ===
The blazon of the municipal coat of arms is Gules St. Valentin clad Argent and caped Or with his dexter raised in blessing and holding in sinister a crosier of the last. The figure of Valentin von Rätien (an early bishop of Passau) comes from the municipal seal, where he is also represented as a seated figure.

== Geography ==
Tenna had an area, as of 2006, of 11.3 km^{2} (4.4 sq mi). Of this area, 45.1% is used for agricultural purposes, while 34% is forested. Of the rest of the land, 1.1% is settled (buildings or roads) and the remainder (19.8%) is non-productive (rivers, glaciers or mountains).

The former municipality is located in the Safien sub-district of the Surselva district. It is a German-speaking collection of small settlements on a terrace above the west side of the Safien Valley. It consists of the village of Tenna which is made up of the sections of Ausserberg, Mitte, and Innerberg as well as the hamlets of Acla and Egschi along the valley road.

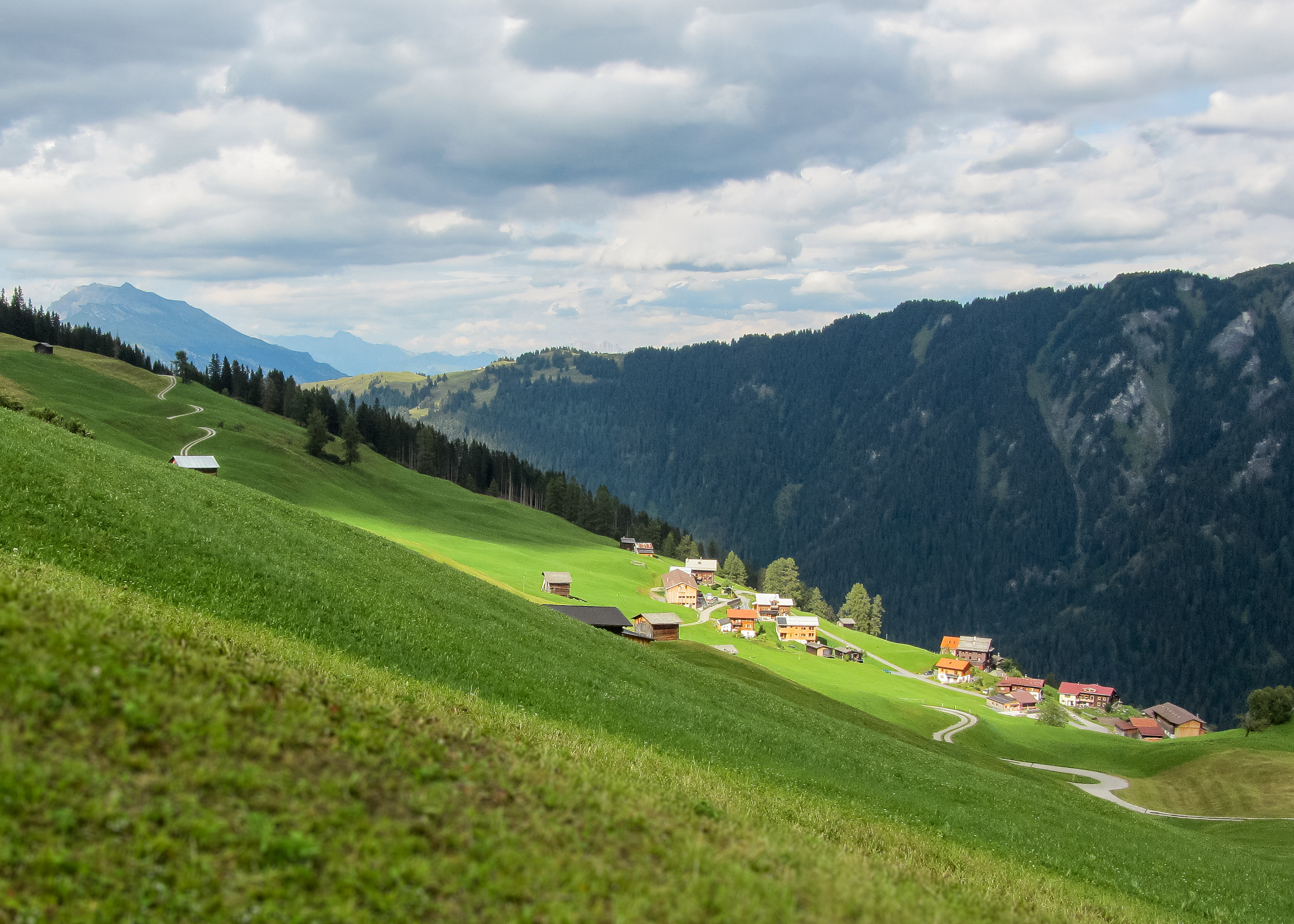
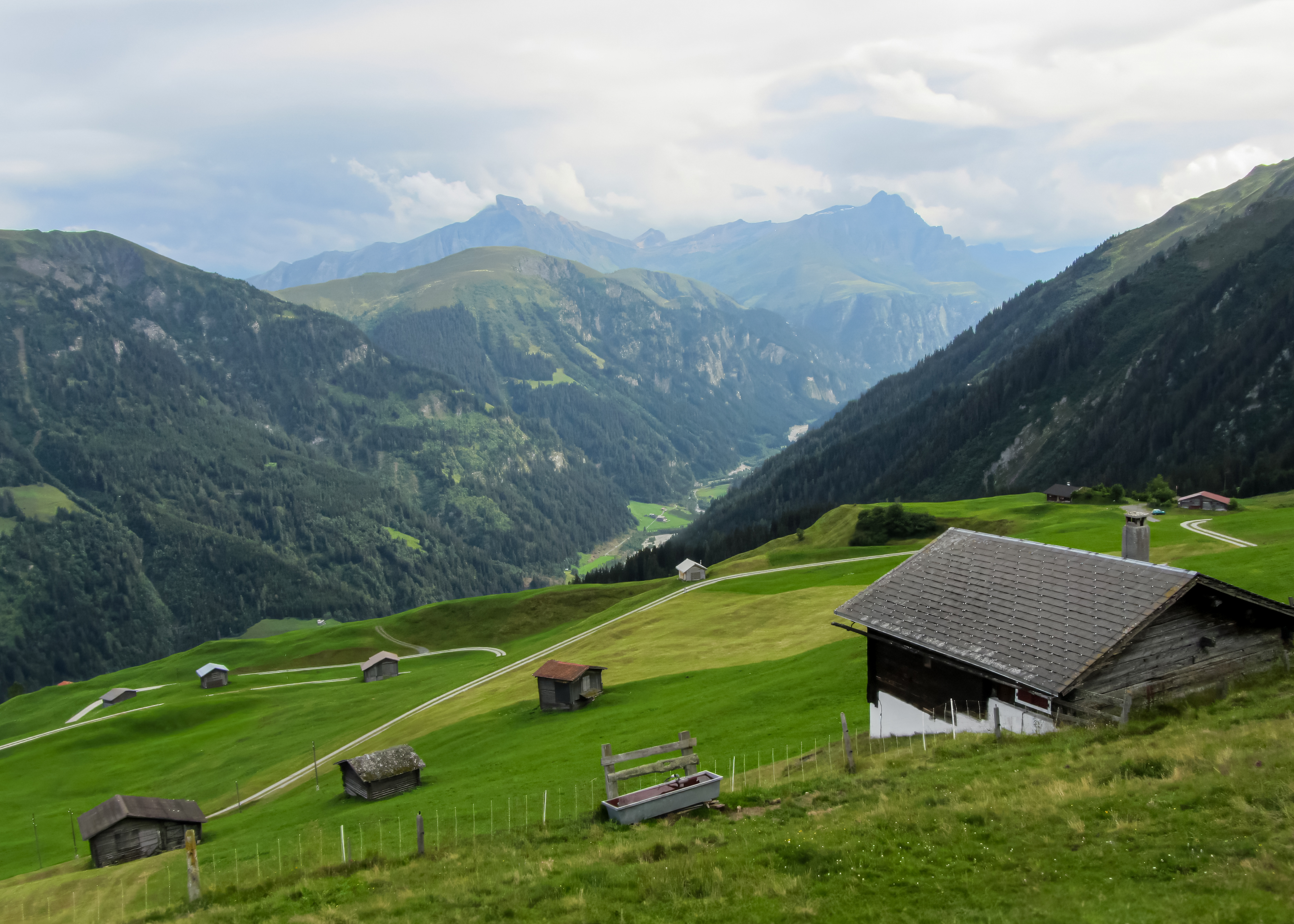
Farms and homes in Tenna

=== Ticks ===
Tenna is mostly in a tick-free / low-risk area. However, as you move lower down to areas with higher humidity and warmer temperatures, such as the Rabiusa, the risk of ticks increases. Nearby municipalities, such as Versam, show up as hot (high-risk) in Switzerland's tick bite model.

== Heritage sites of national significance ==
The Swiss Reformed church in Tenna is listed as a Swiss heritage site of national significance.

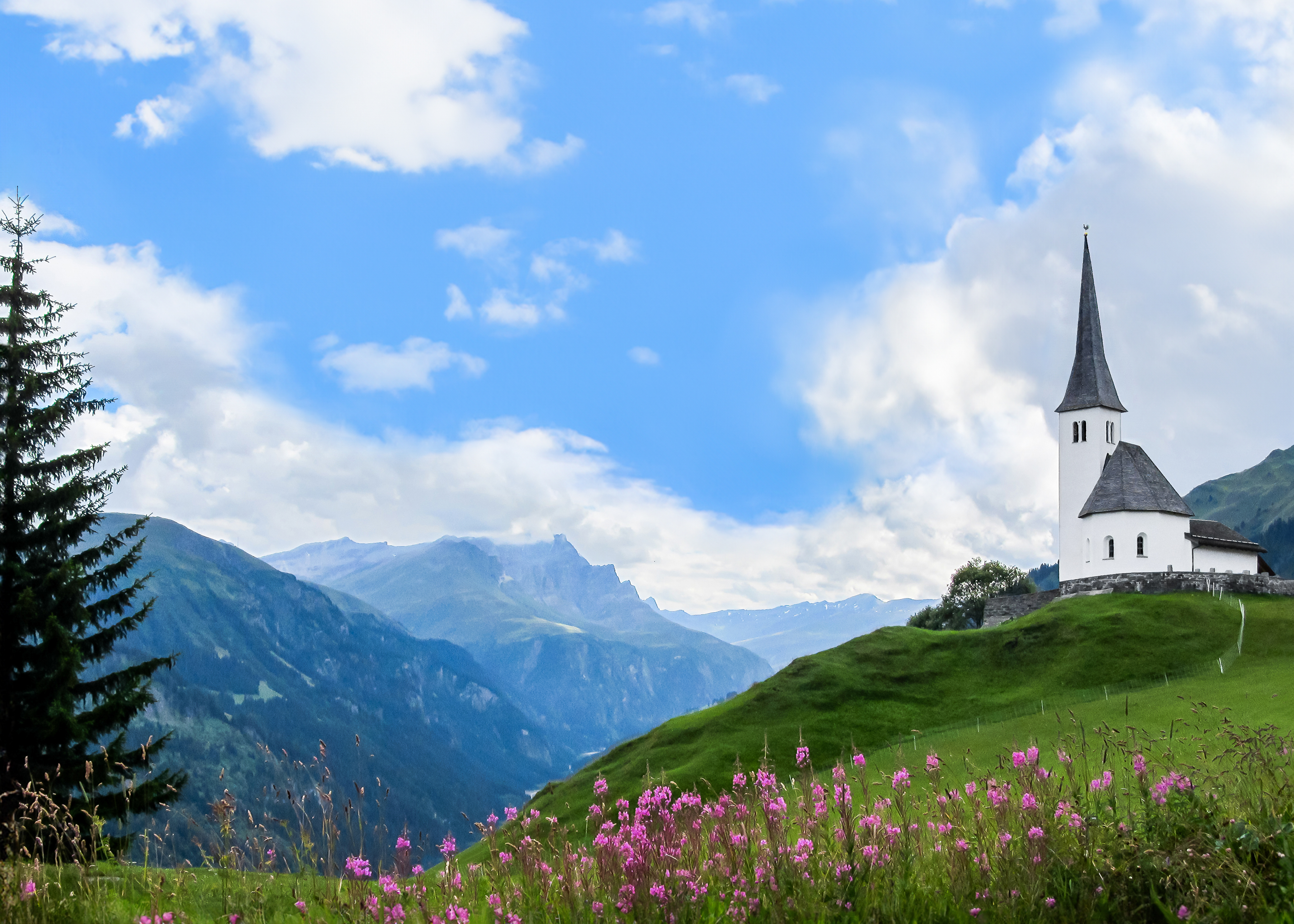
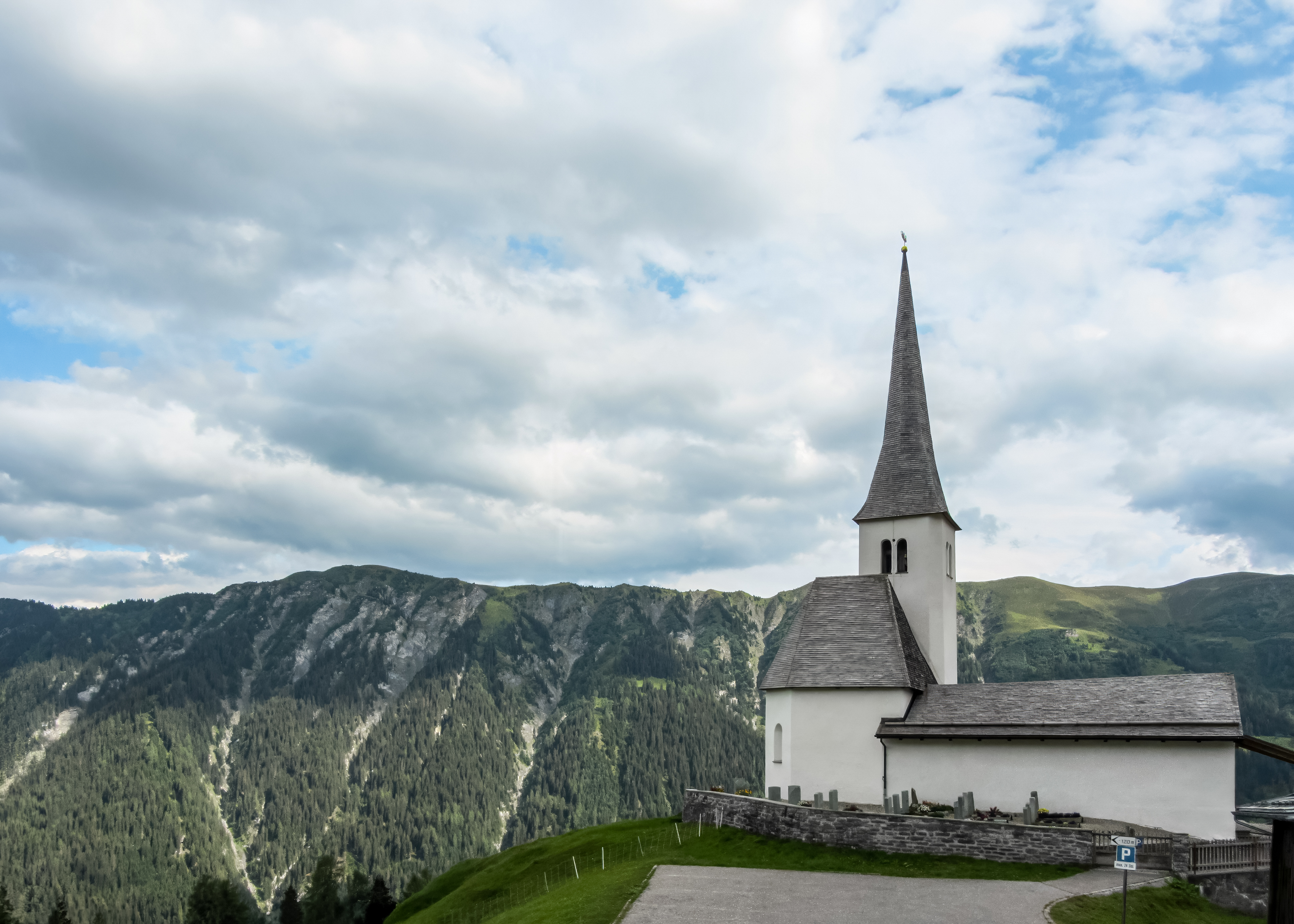
Tenna's Swiss Reformed church and graveyard.

== Solar ski lift ==
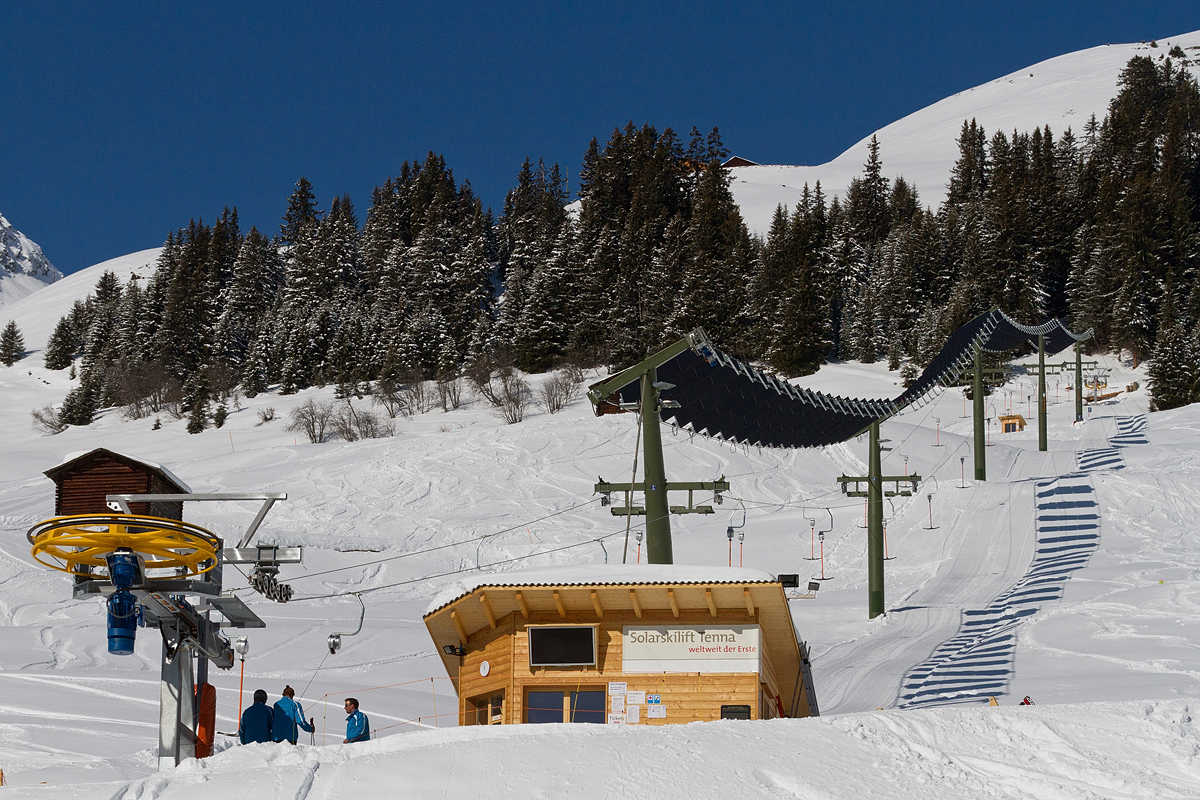
Tenna's solar ski lift

In February 2012, the world’s first solar-powered ski lift was completed in Tenna. It is 450 meters long and has the capacity to pull 800 skiers up the mountain per hour. The lift uses approximately 80 solar panels, which are expected to produce around 90,000 kWh of energy per year—of which only 22,000 kWh are required for the operation of the ski lift. The excess power is sold to the grid.

== Demographics ==
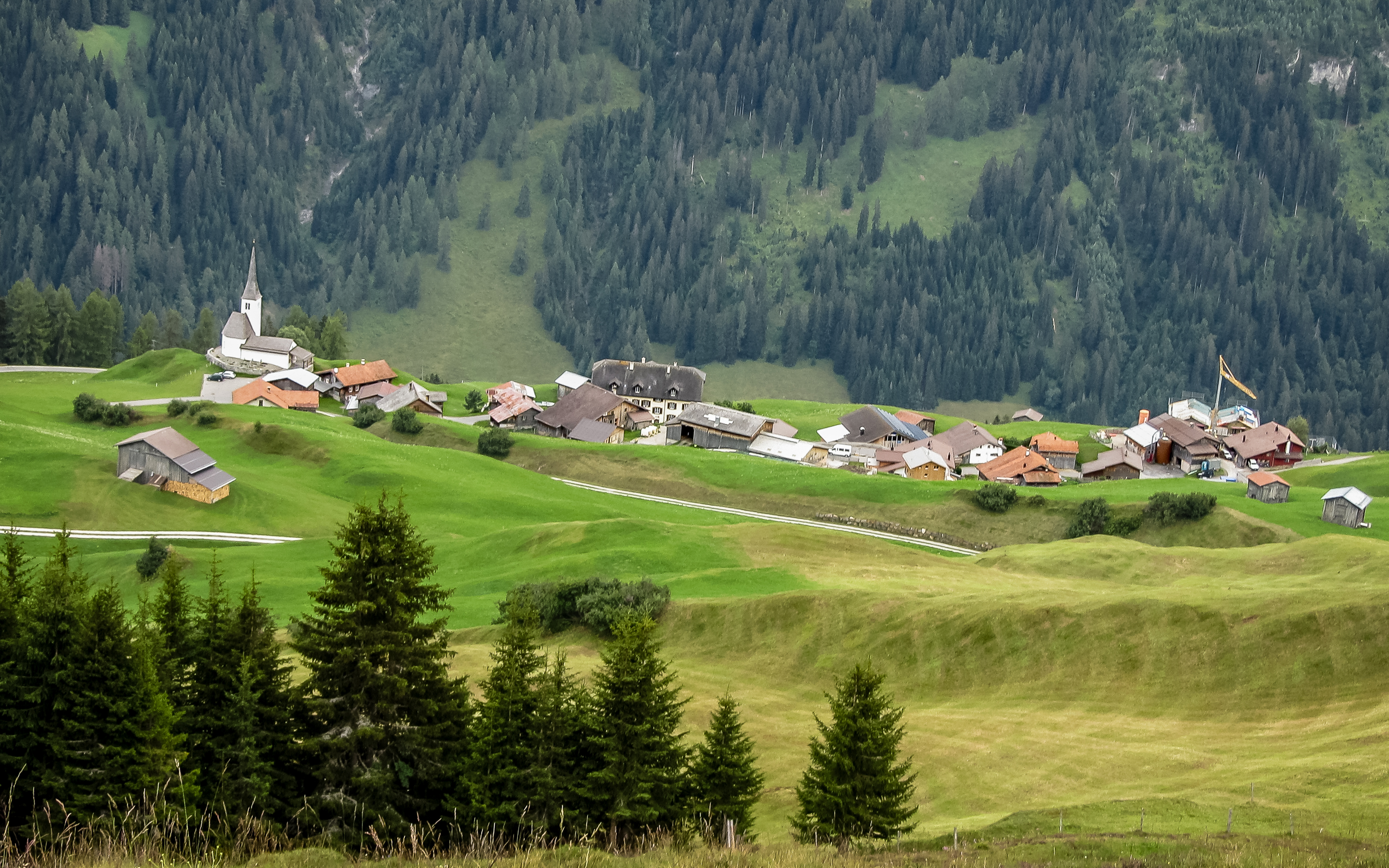
Tenna's village center as seen from the dairy farm

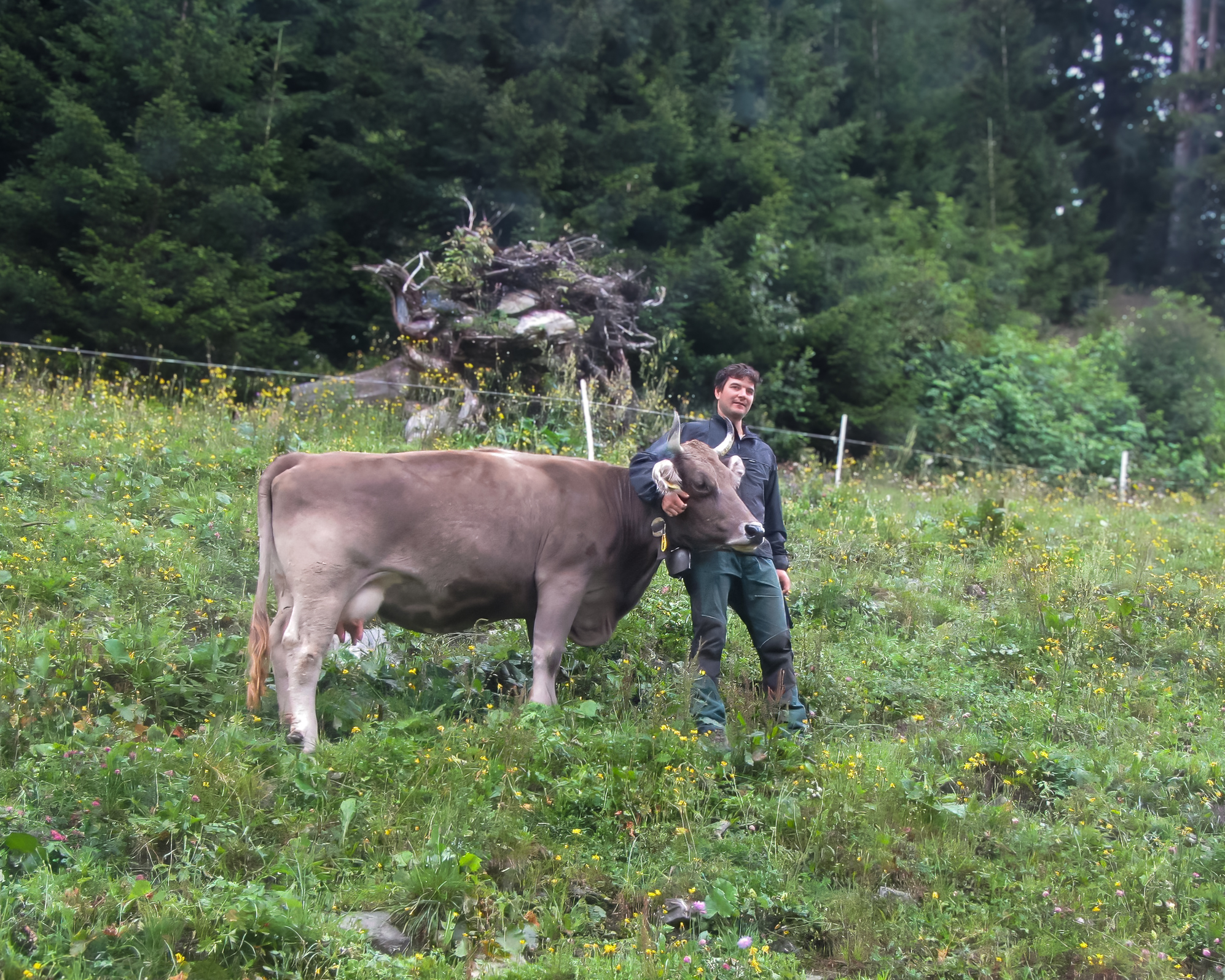
A farmer in Tenna hugging his cow

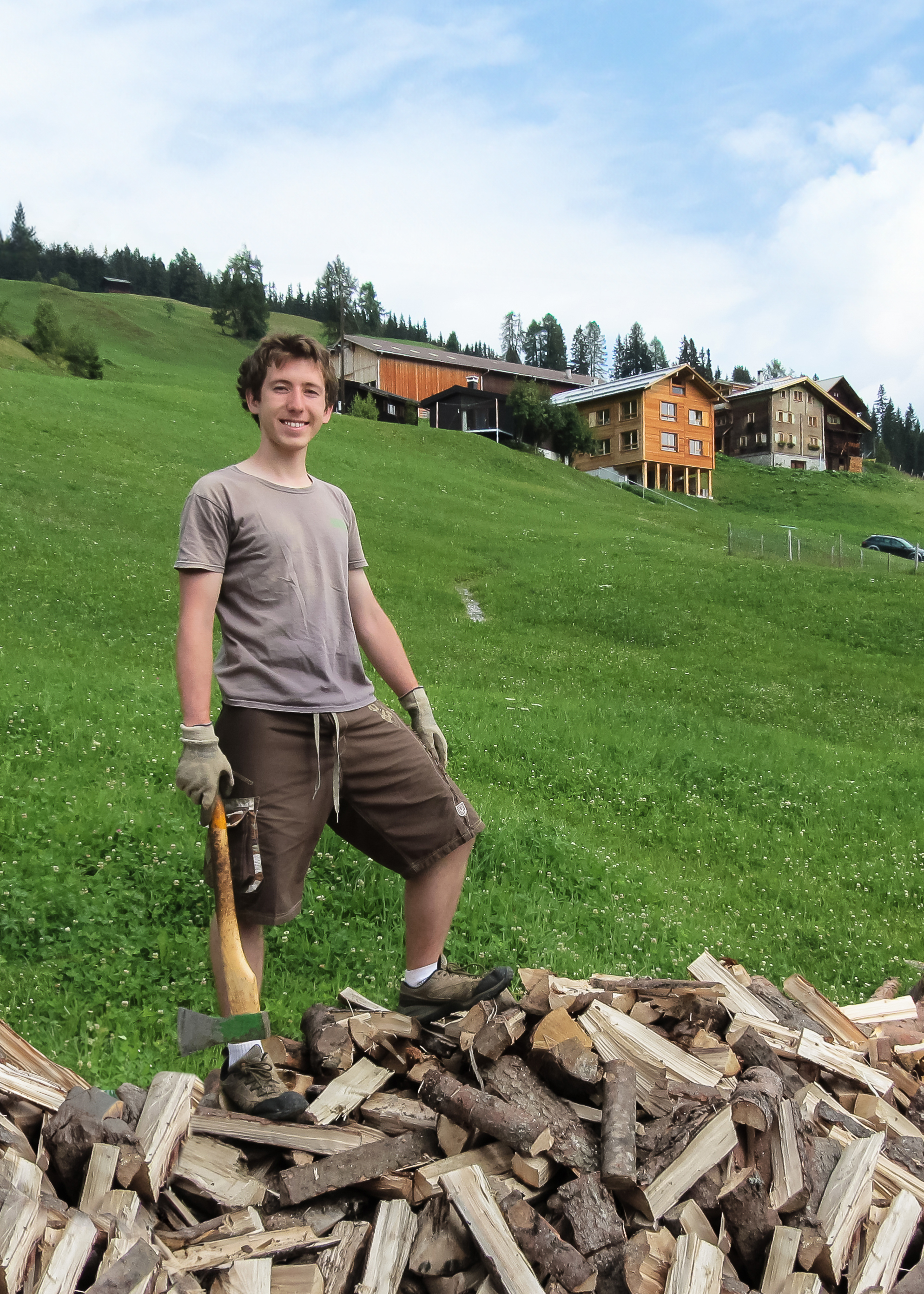
A farmer in Tenna chopping wood

As of 2011, Tenna has a population of 110—recovering from a historical low of 79 in 2000.

| Year | Population |
|---|---|
| 2010 | 110 |
| 2000 | 79 |
| 1950 | 141 |
| 1900 | 130 |
| 1850 | 162 |
| 1803 | 157 |

As of 2008, 3.9% of the population was made up of foreign nationals.

As of 2000:

- most of the population speaks Swiss German (98.7%), with the rest speaking Serbo-Croatian (1.3%, or exactly 1 person).
- the gender distribution was 47.4% male and 52.6% female.
- the age distribution was as follows:

| Age group | Population | % of total |
|---|---|---|
| Children (0-9yrs) | 11 | 13.9% |
| Teenagers (10-19yrs) | 8 | 10.1% |
| Adults (20-29yrs) | 6 | 7.6% |
| Adults (30-39yrs) | 10 | 12.7% |
| Adults (40-49yrs) | 9 | 11.4% |
| Adults (50-59yrs) | 13 | 16.5% |
| Seniors (60-69yrs) | 8 | 10.1% |
| Seniors (70-79yrs) | 9 | 11.4% |
| Seniors (80-89yrs) | 4 | 5.1% |
| Seniors (90-99yrs) | 1 | 1.3% |
| Total | 79 | 100% |

=== Education ===
Around 74.4% of the population (between age 25–64) have completed either non-mandatory upper secondary education or additional higher education (either university or a fachhochschule). The nearest fachhochschules to Tenna are in Chur, such as the Chur University of Applied Sciences and Fachhochschule Graubünden.

=== Politics ===
In the 2007 federal election the most popular party was the SVP which received 54.7% of the vote. The next three most popular parties were the SP (20.3%), the FDP (14.2%) and the CVP (5.2%).

== Economy ==
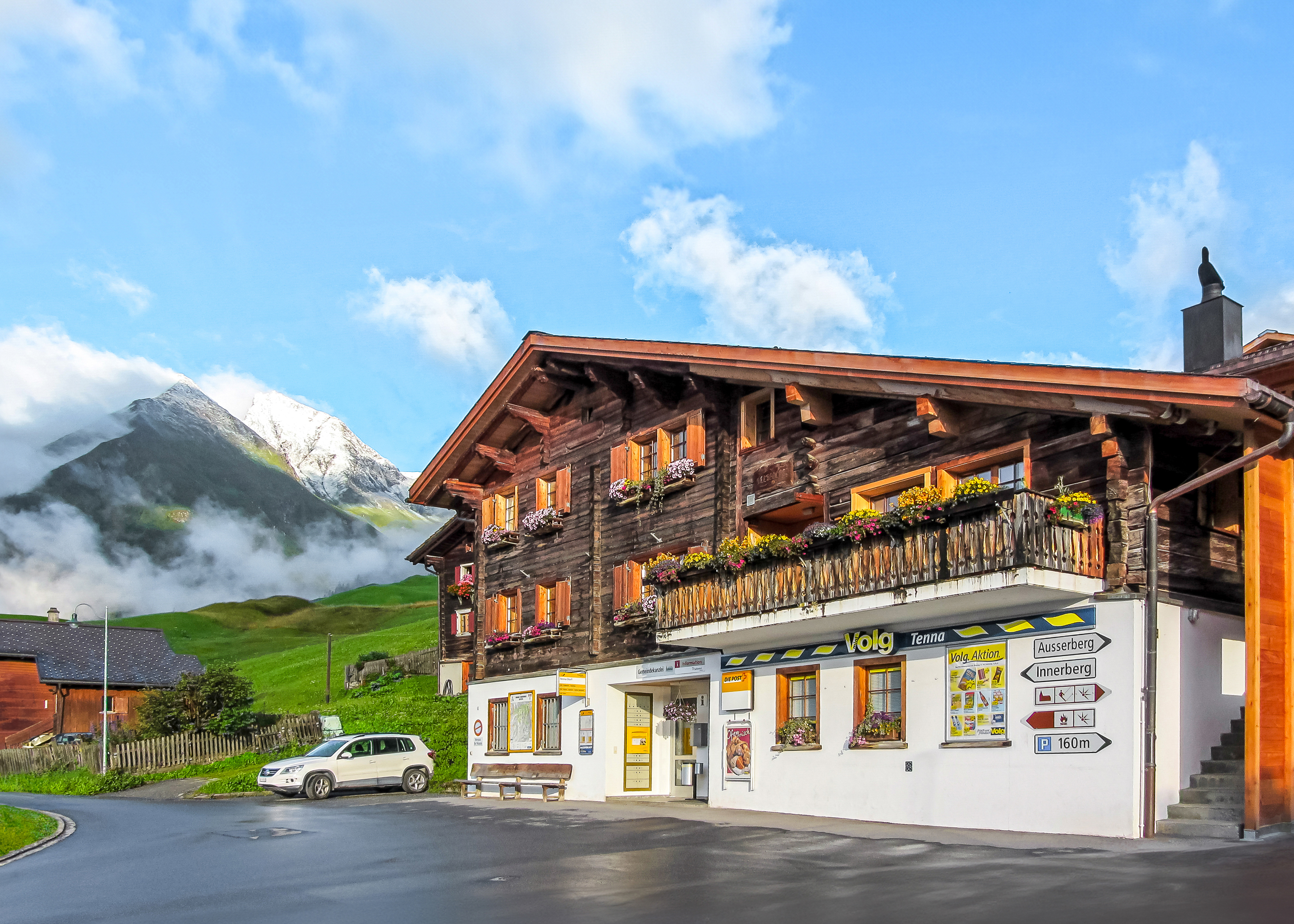
Tenna's Volg Mini store, post office, and PostAuto stop

As of 2005, Tenna has an unemployment rate of 0%. Employment and businesses were organized as follows:

| Sector | People Employed | Businesses Involved |
|---|---|---|
| Primary (raw materials) | 38 | 12 |
| Secondary (manufacturing) | 0 | 0 |
| Tertiary (service) | 8 | 4 |

Agriculture is the largest economic activity in Tenna, particularly hay harvesting for which there are government subsidies. There is just one cattle farm left in the village and it produces dairy and beef products.

The second largest economic activity is tourism. Visitors come to Tenna in the winter for skiing and in the summer for hiking, agritourism, and rafting and kayaking (at the nearby Versam-Safien railway station).

Despite its small size, Tenna has a hotel, holiday apartments, and bed and breakfasts. There is also a Volg Mini store that serves the essential shopping needs of locals and visitors.

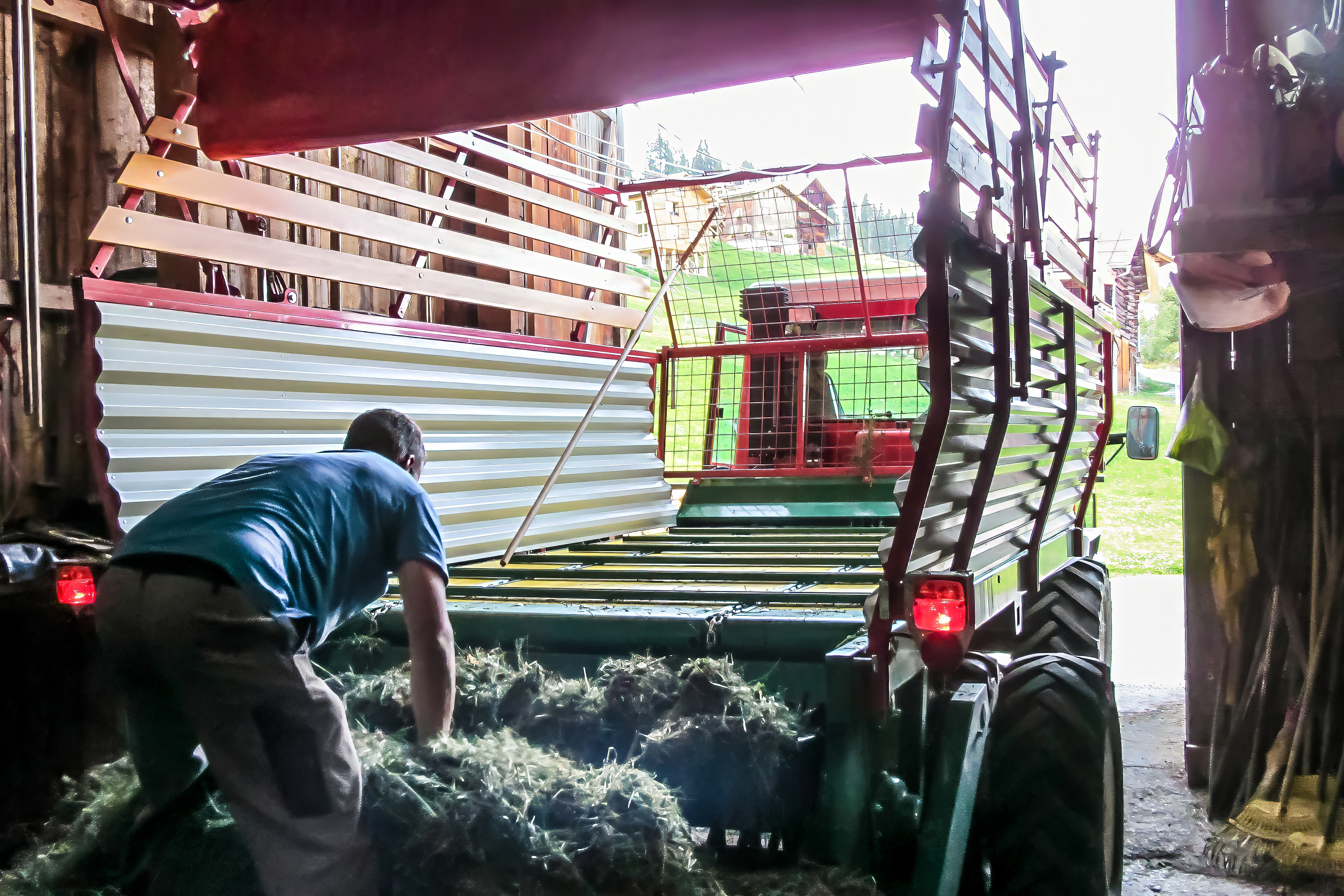
Unloading hay into a silo in Tenna

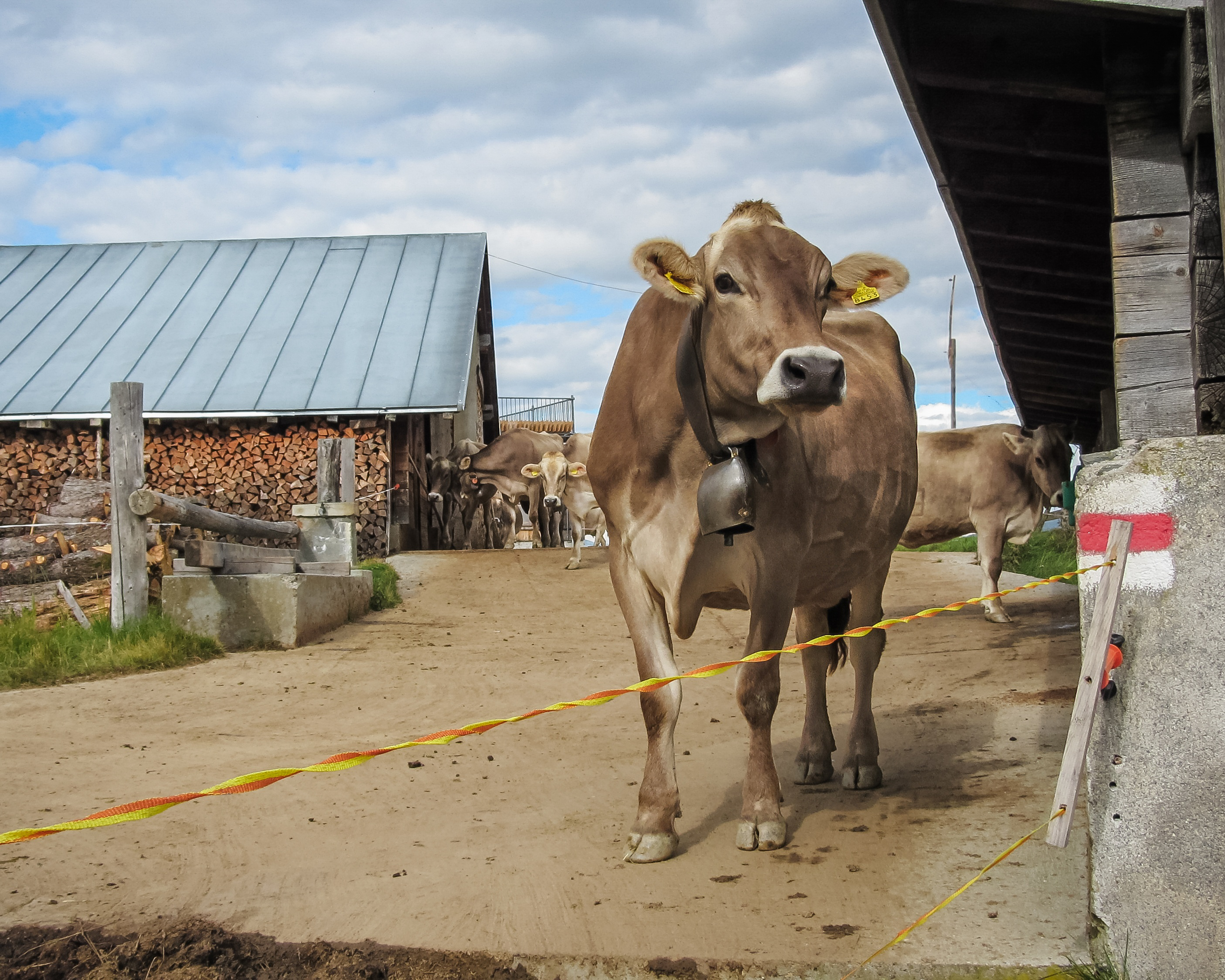
Tenna's last dairy farm

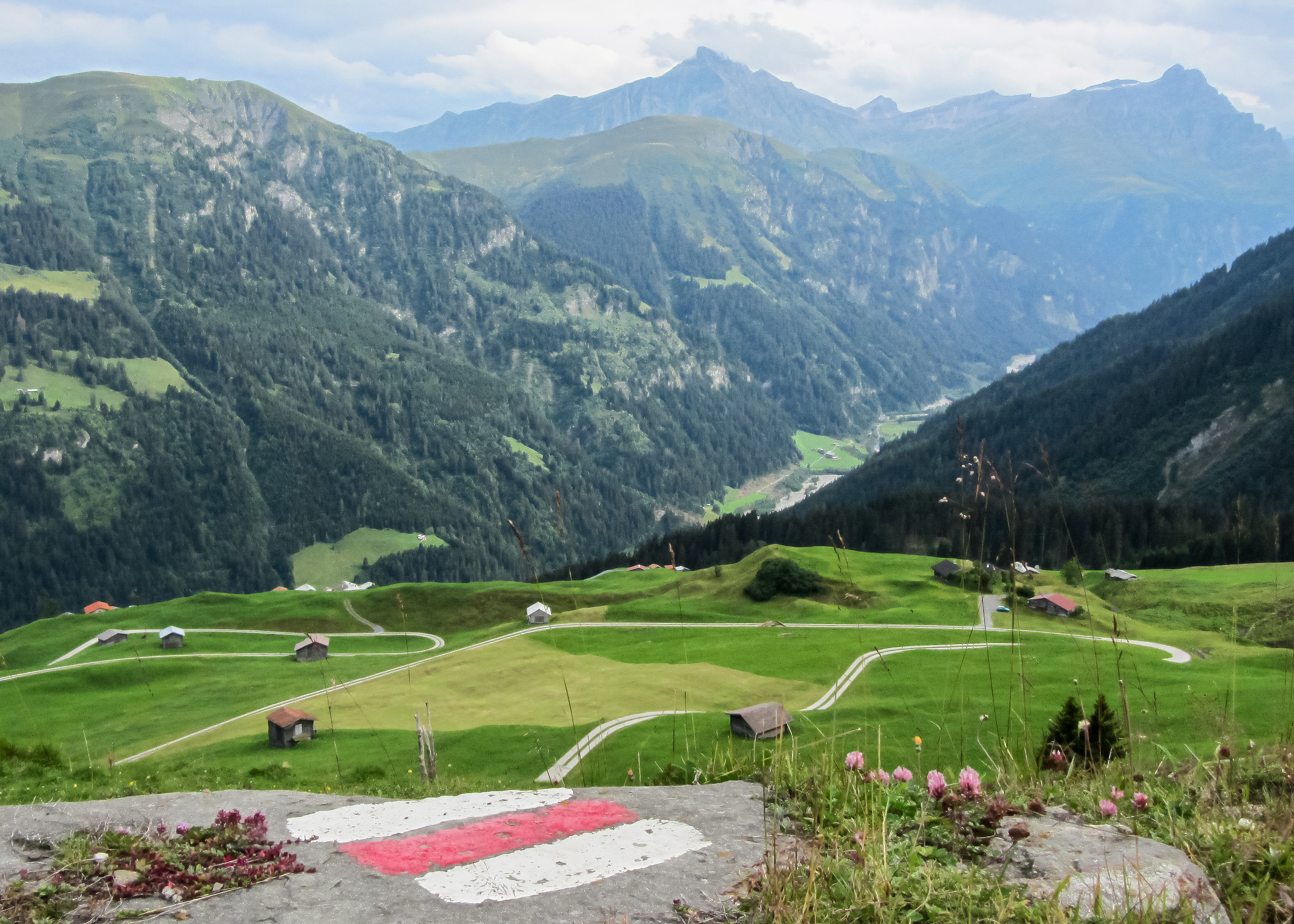
Swiss trail marker in Tenna

== Transportation ==
Tenna is accessible by just one road that splits off from Acla / Ober Egshi.

Tenna has a PostAuto bus stop at the Volg Mini store. The bus connects Tenna to Versam and Versam-Safien railway station via the Aclatobel Tunnel built in 1994.

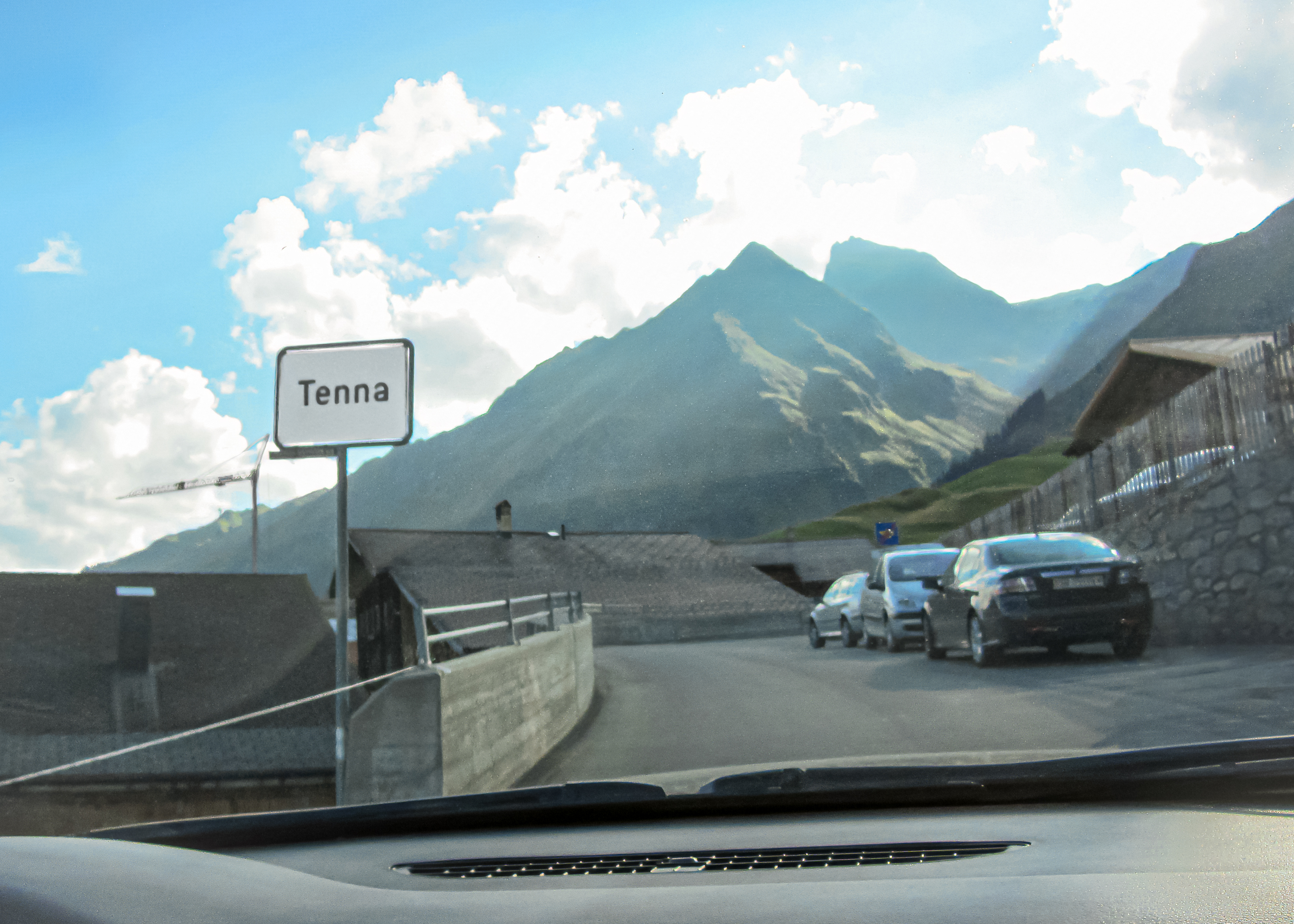
Tenna sign from Mitti road

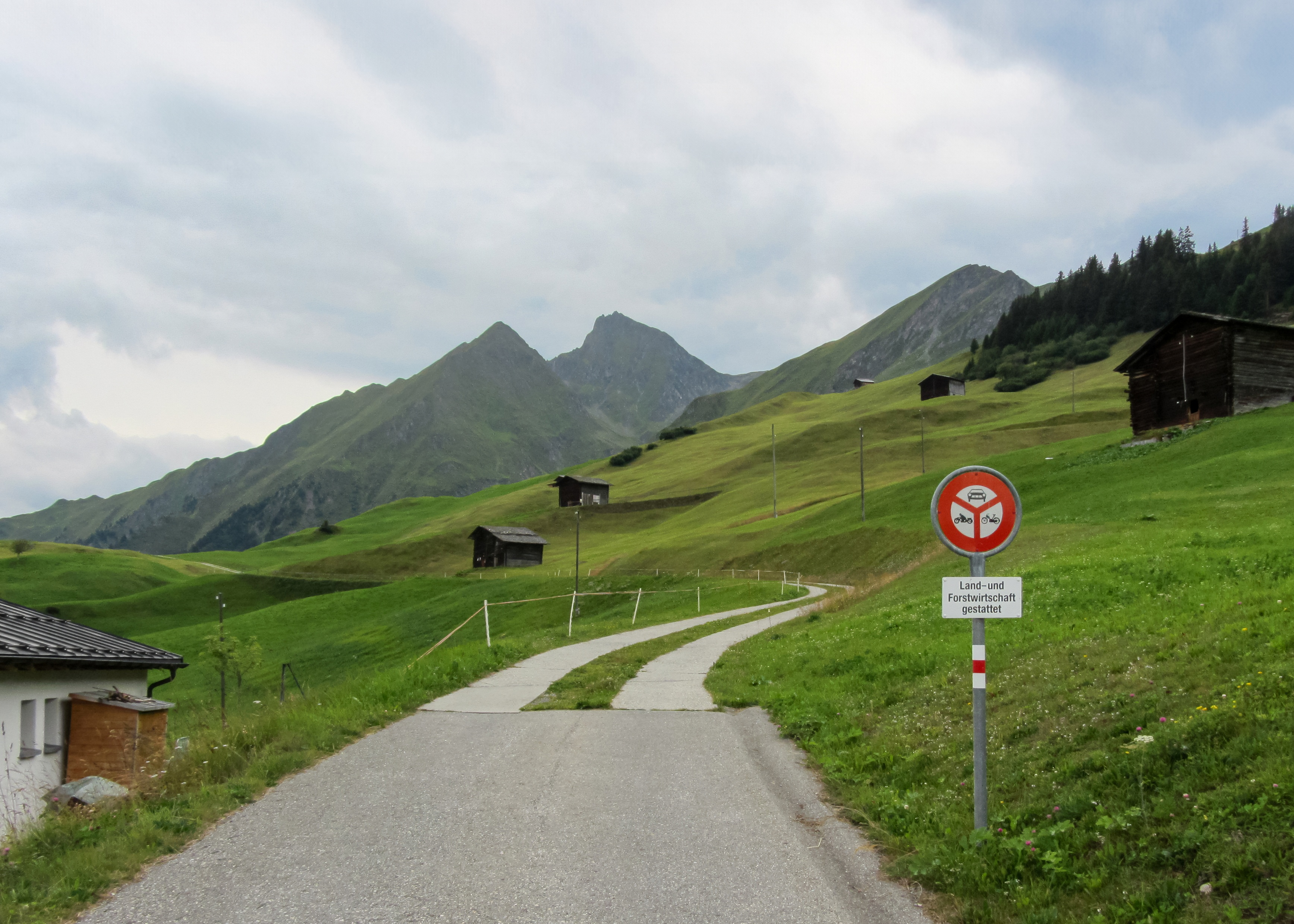
Tenna's Ausserberg road

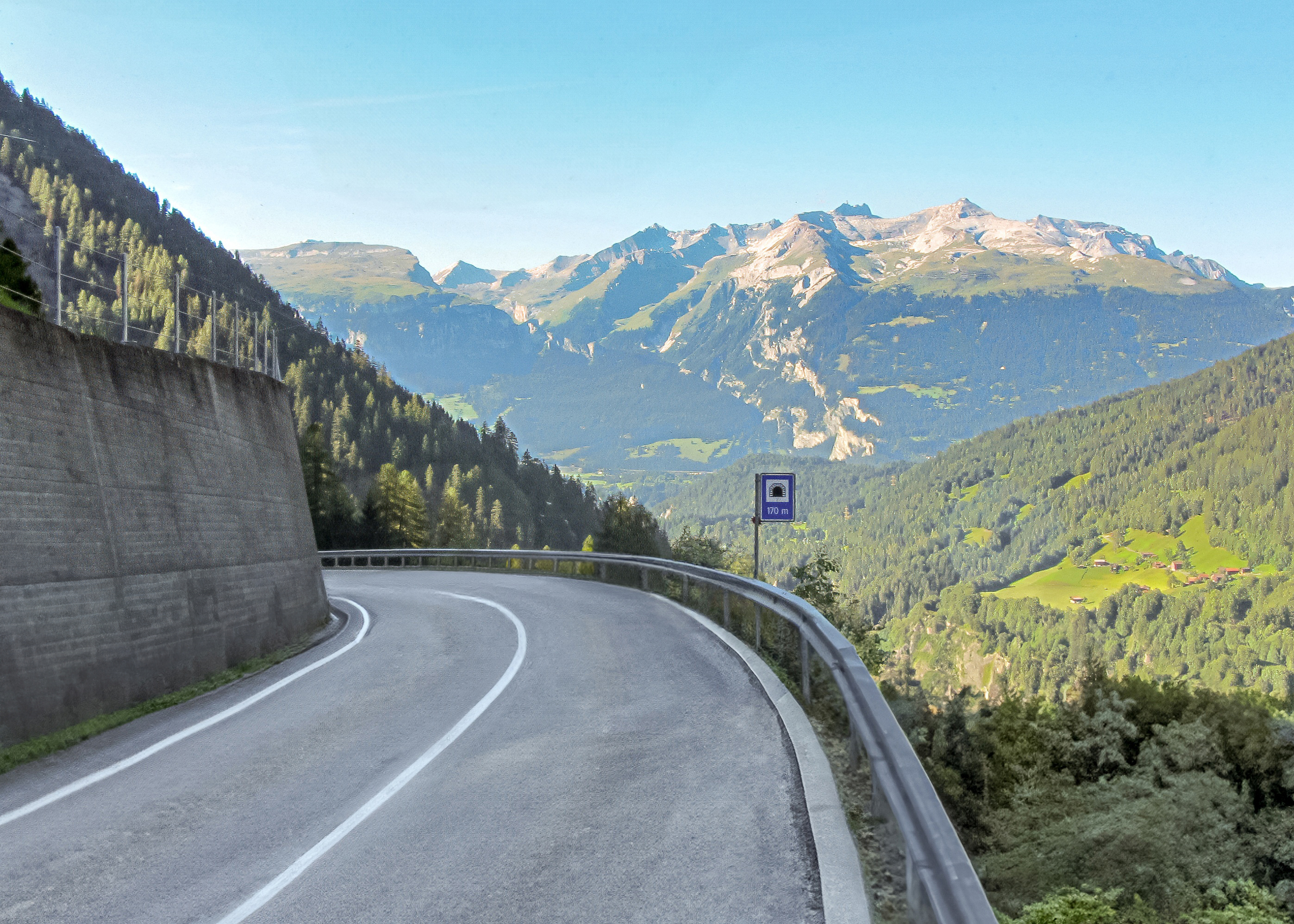
Acla Road (Tenna to Versam)

== Gallery ==
Aerial view (1949)

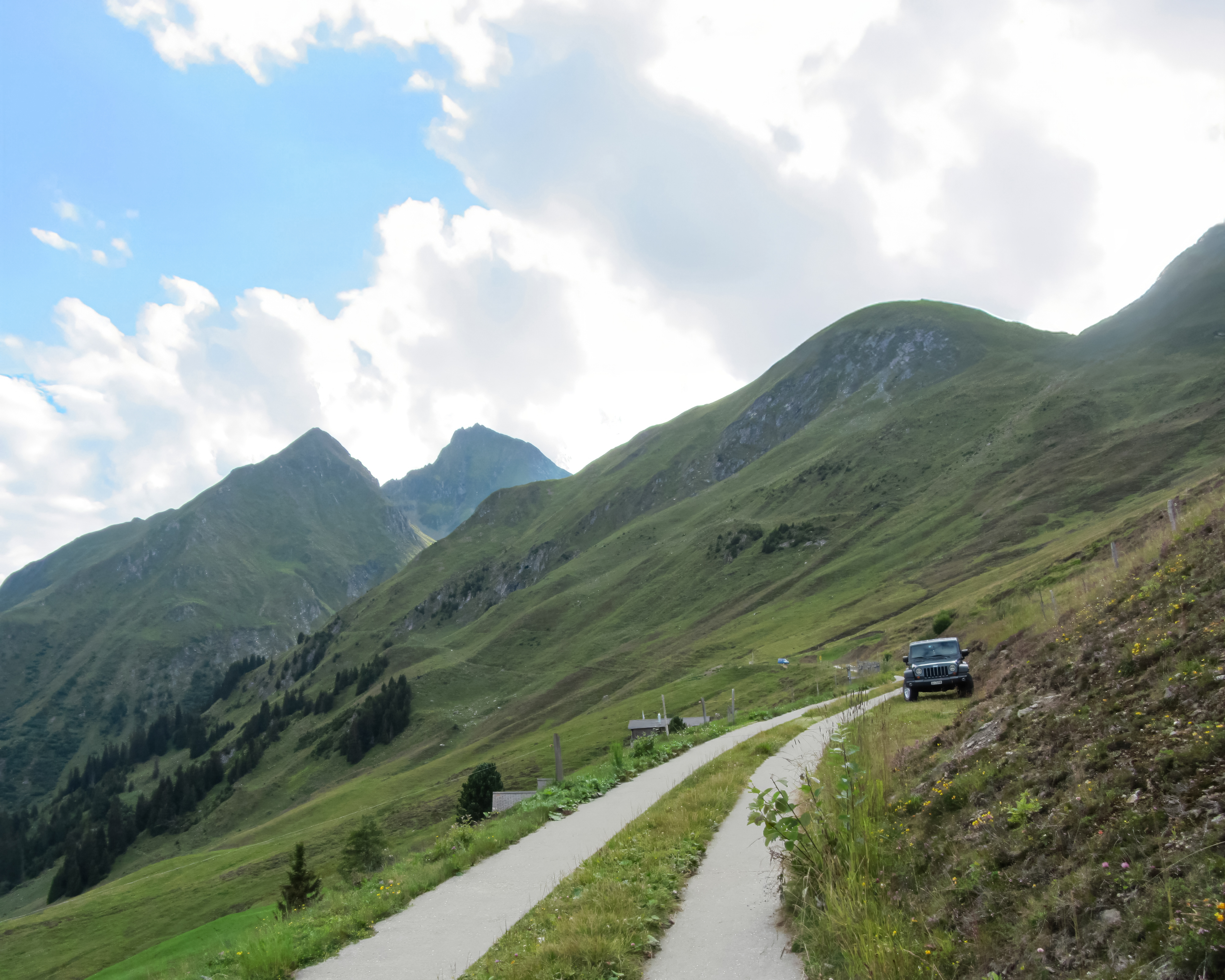
Tenna's Innerbärg road

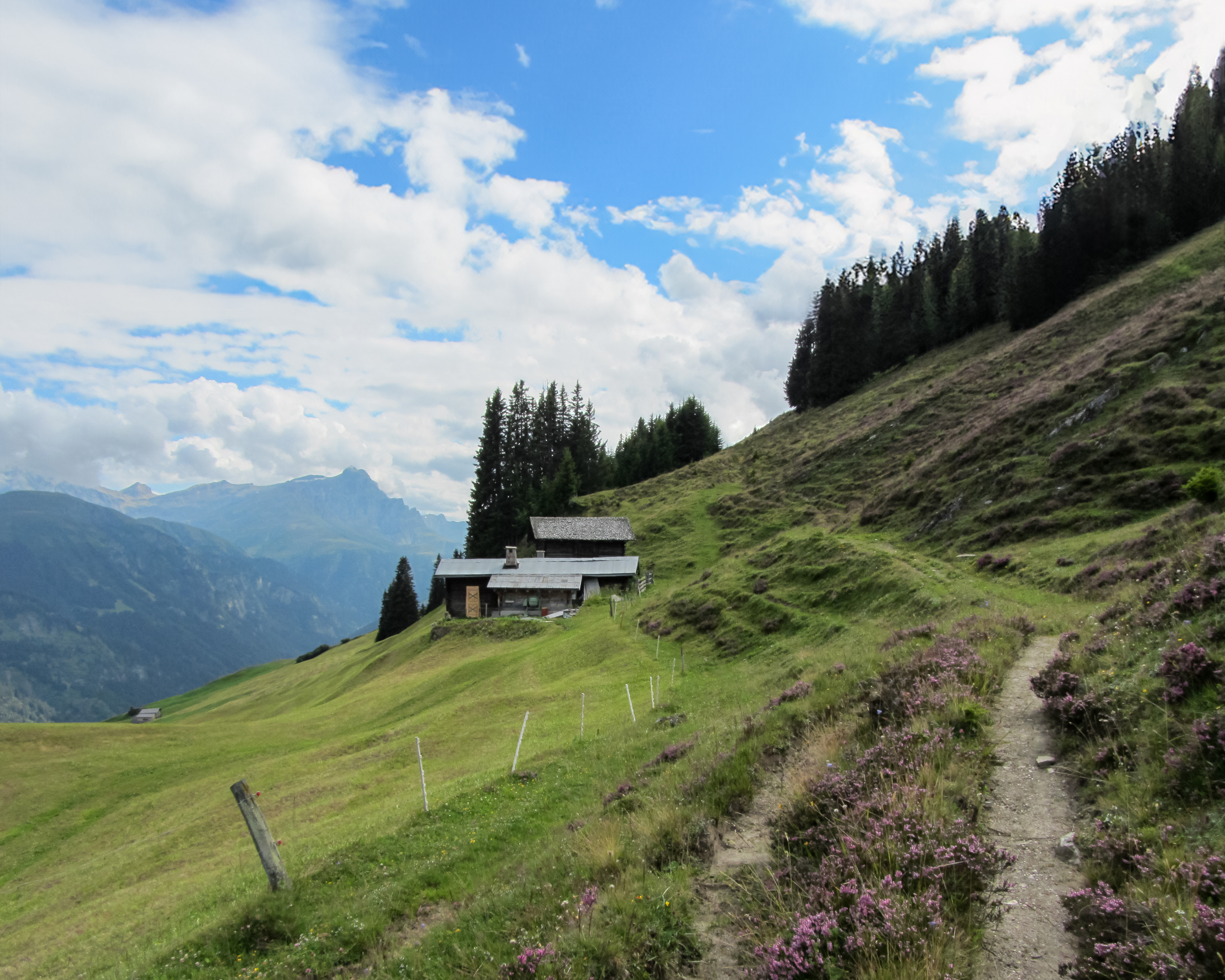
Farm in Tenna

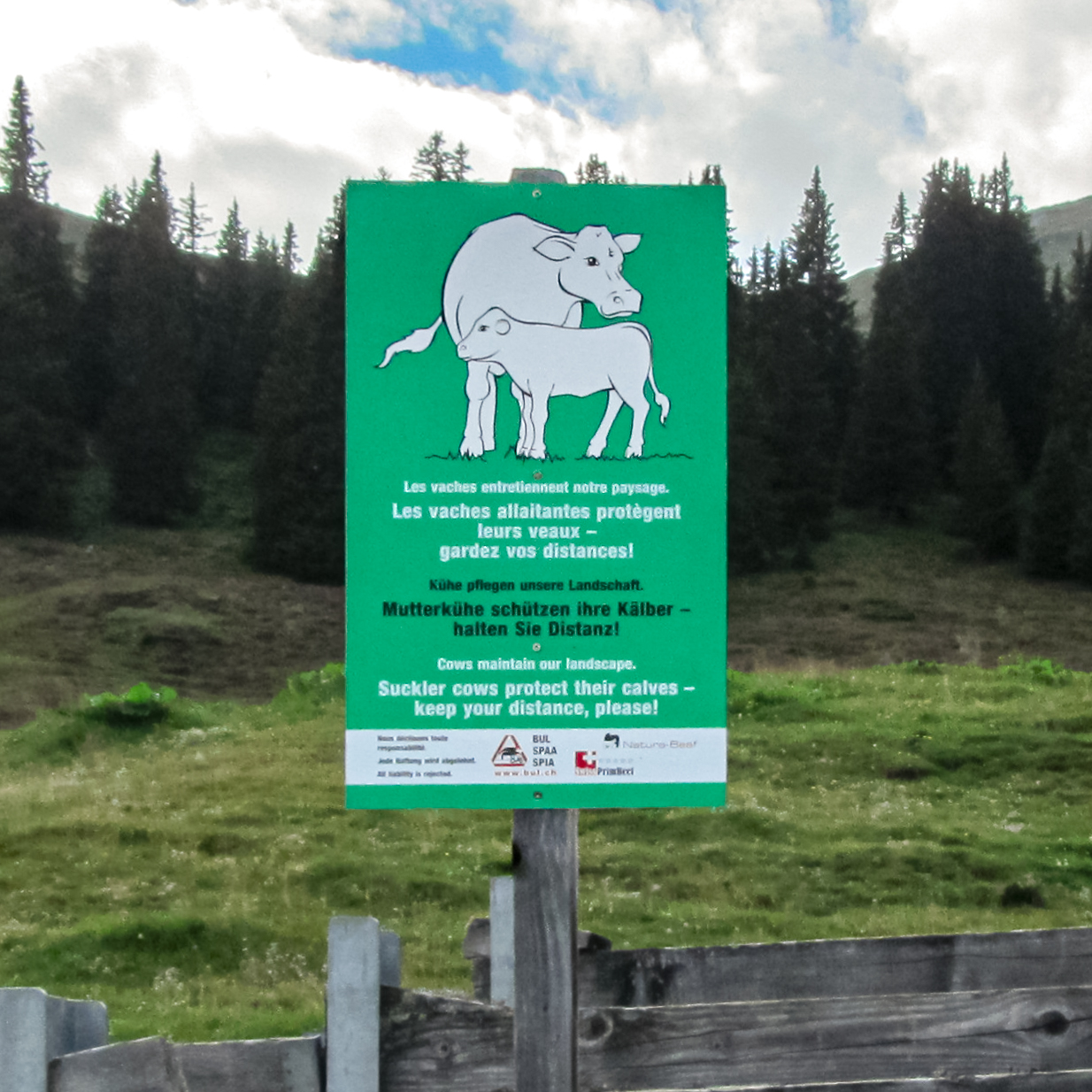
Cow warning in Tenna

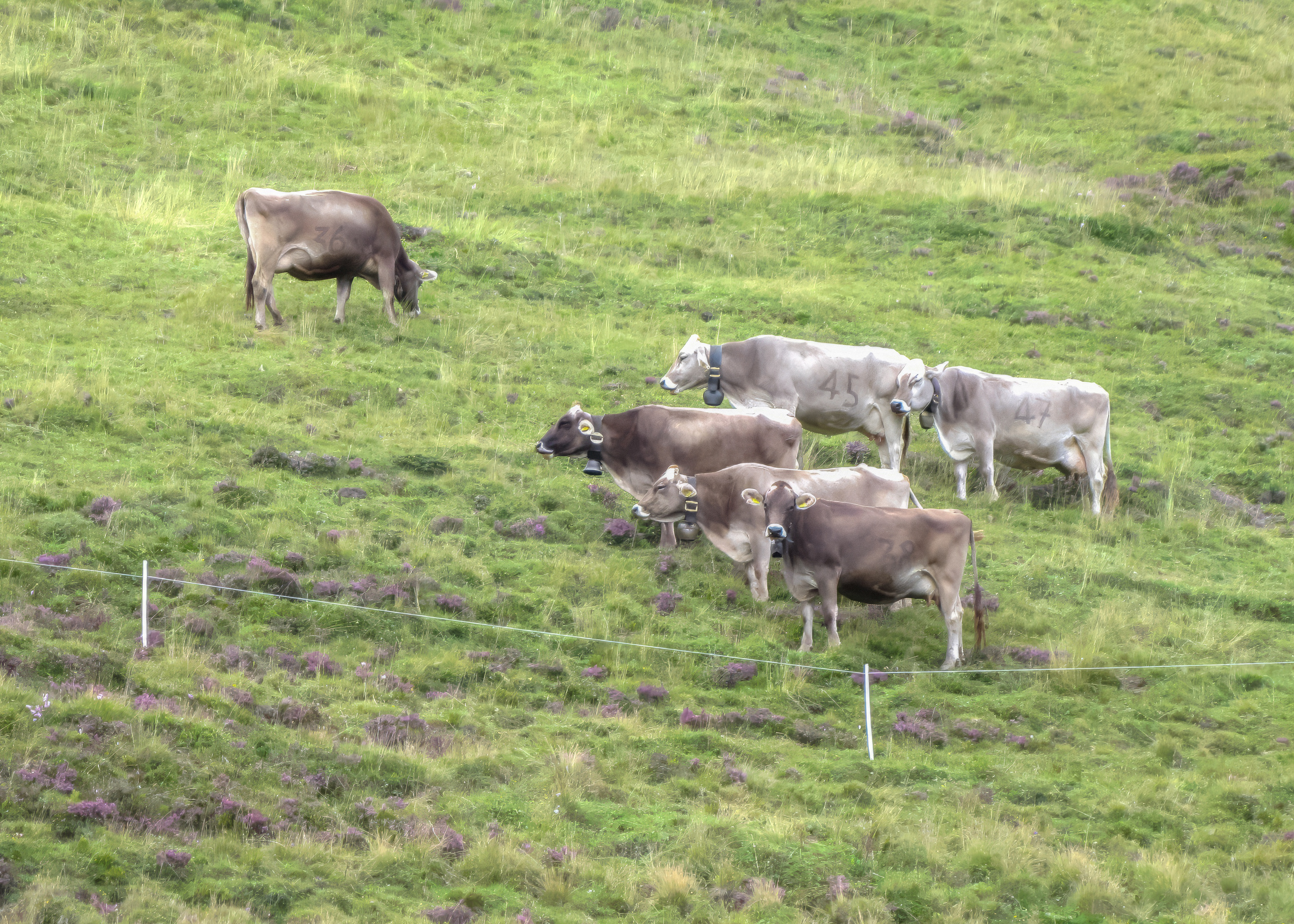
Cows grazing in Tenna

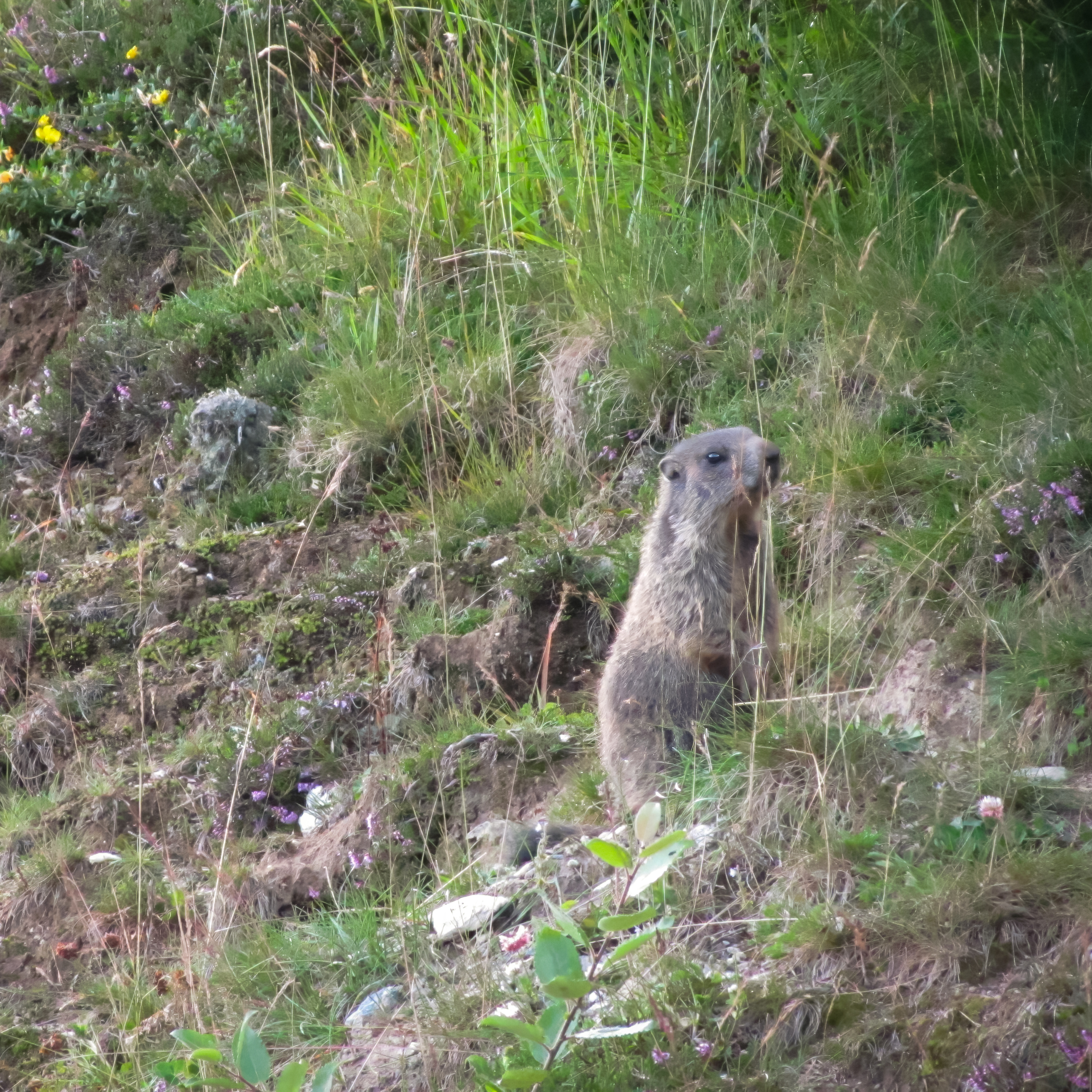
Alpine marmot in Tenna

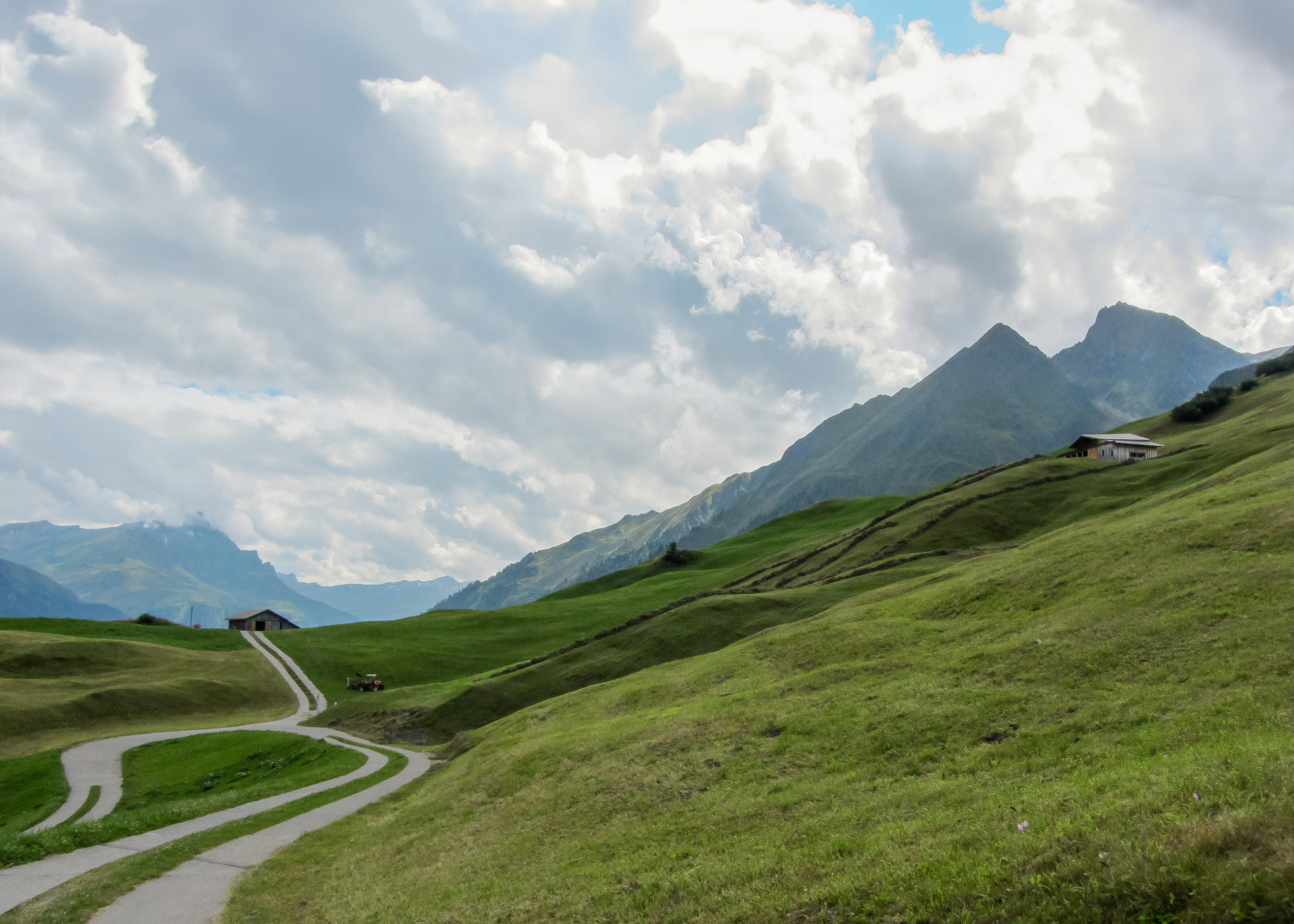
Tenna's Usserbarg road

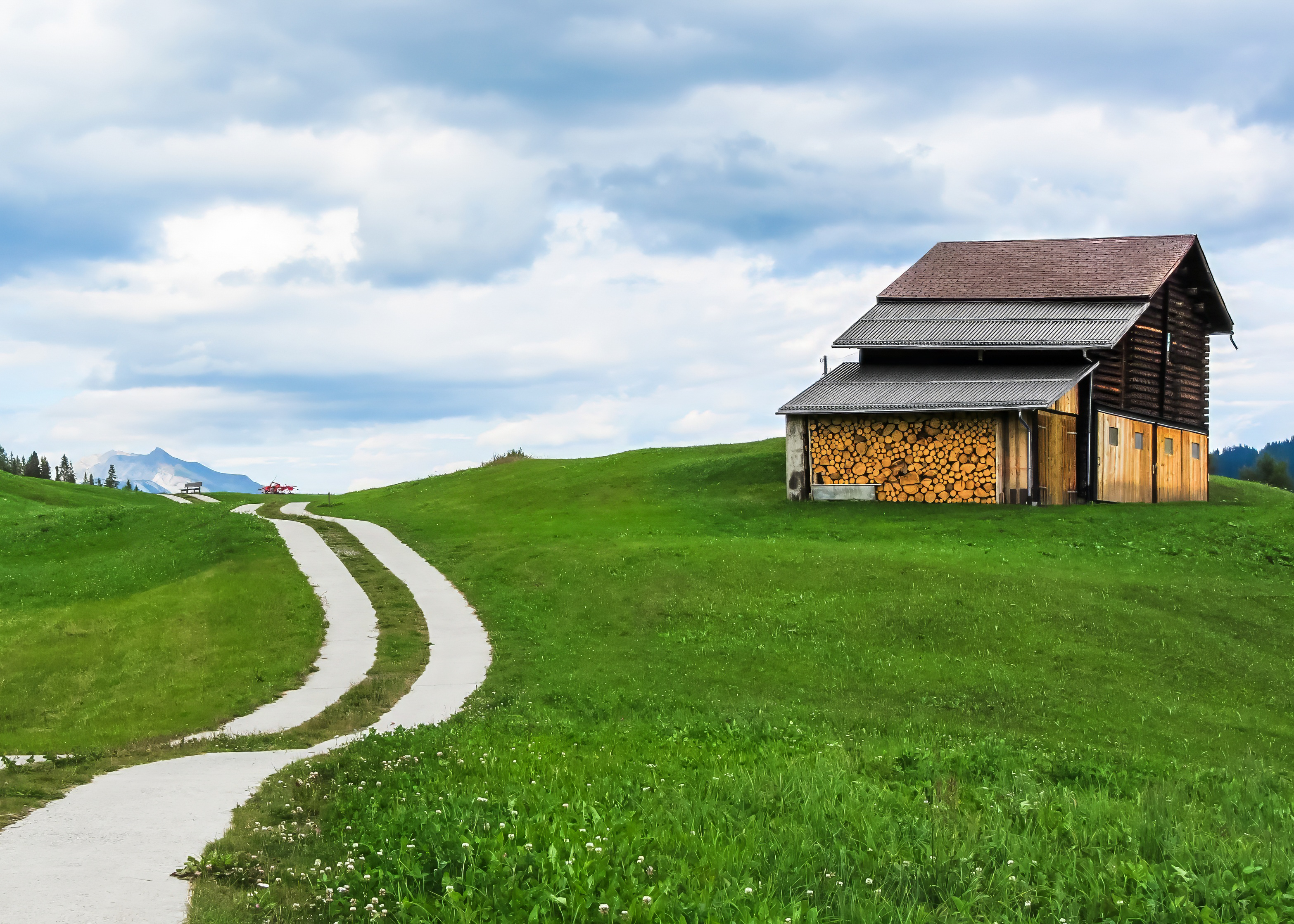
Barn in Tenna with firewood

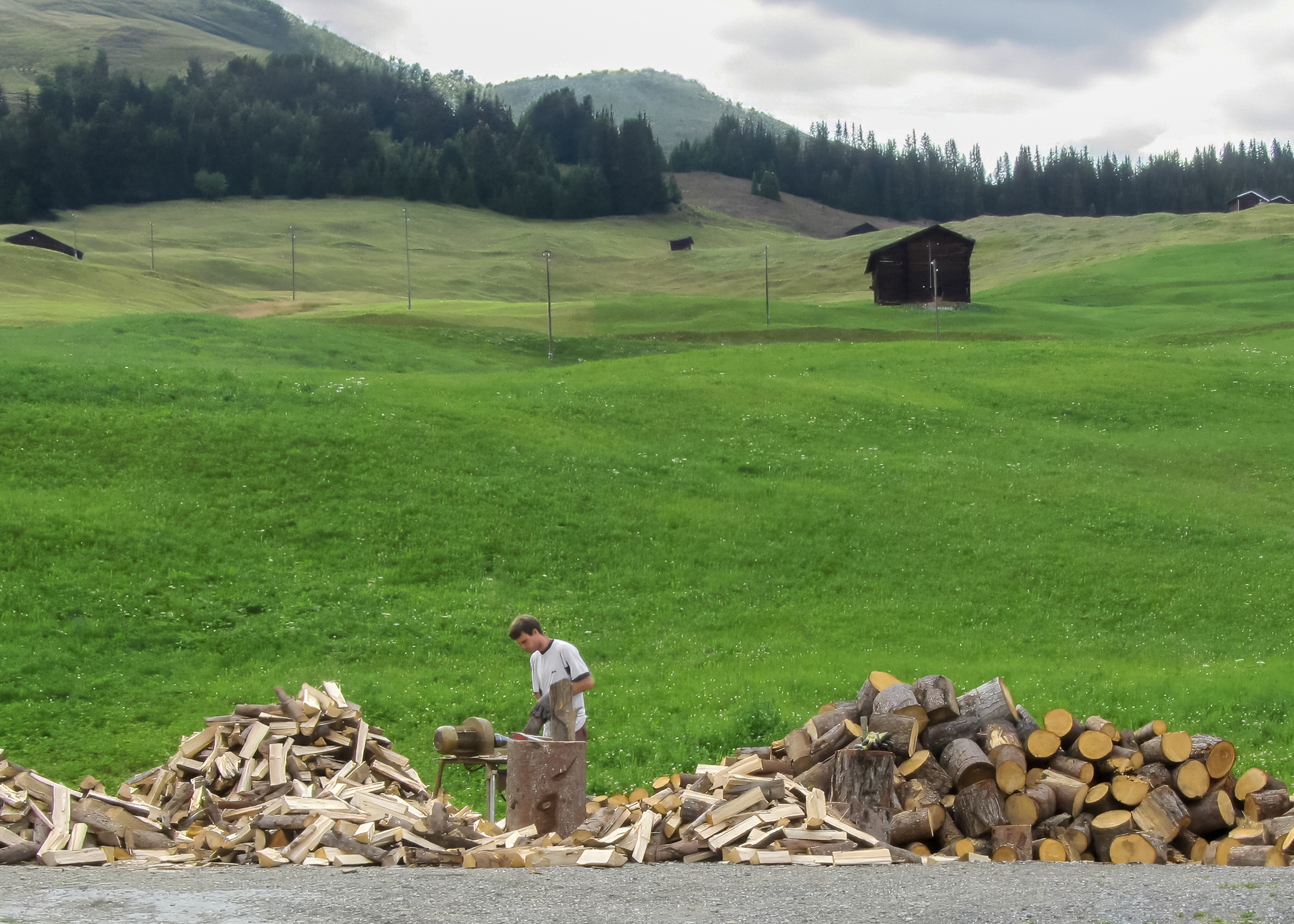
A resident of Tenna preparing firewood

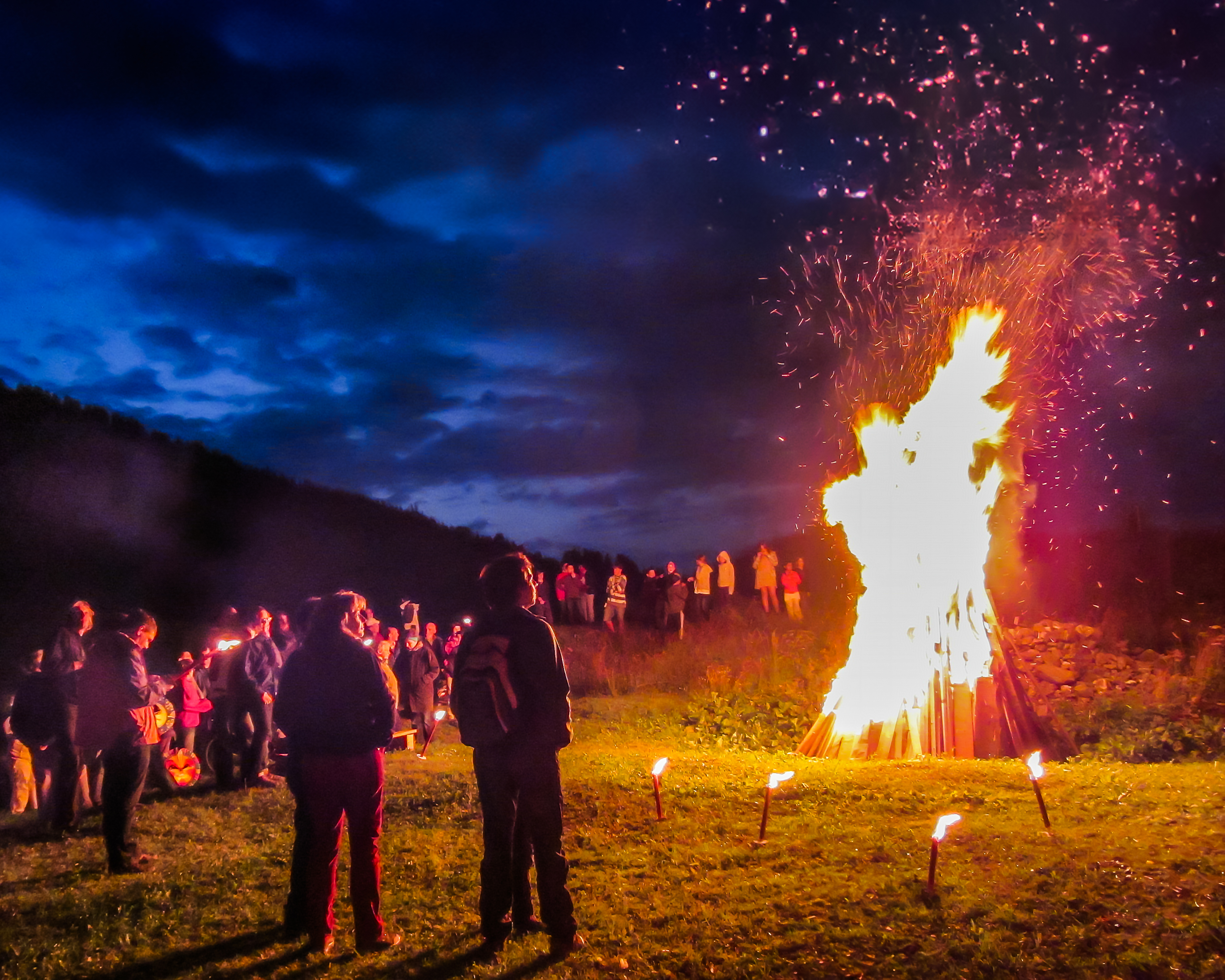
Swiss National Day in Tenna
