= Shea Marshall =

American musician (born 1984)

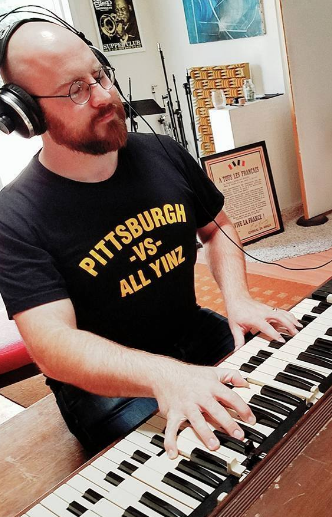

Background information
- Born: Shea Robert Marshall; August 31, 1984
- Origin: Pittsburgh, Pennsylvania, USA
- Genres: Jazz; Blues; House music
- Occupation: Session musician
- Instruments: Saxophone and Hammond B-3

Shea Marshall (born August 31, 1984, in Pittsburgh, Pennsylvania) is an American multi-instrumentalist and session musician whose primary instruments are saxophone and Hammond B-3.

== Early life ==
Marshall was born in McMurray, Pennsylvania, a suburb of Pittsburgh. He was first introduced to the organ by his grandmother at the age of 5 and studied Violin from the age of 6. Marshall started playing Guitar at the age of 10 and soon began sitting in at jam sessions in and around Pittsburgh on guitar and, shortly thereafter, sax. Marshall graduated from Peters Township High School.

He started college at the age of 16 at Arizona State University and studied electrical engineering. While a student there, he also studied piano, harmony, and improvisation with Chuck Marohnic.

== Career ==
Marshall had lived in Phoenix, Arizona since 2001 and composes, records, and performs in many styles of music. Marshall has toured internationally and worked as a session musician/sideman with Ludacris, Nas, Obadiah Parker, Dennis Rowland, Maceo Parker, Bernard Purdie, Dick Wagner, Human Nature, Jason DeVore, Black Carl, Julito Padrón, Joe Gallivan, Cait Brennan, Danny Torgersen, Lisa Foiles, Blaine Long, Luisito Carrión, Blake Lewis, Juini Booth, Gunhild Carling, Walt Richardson, Carolina Cerisola, Mickey McGee, T. R. Hummer, Leroy Jenkins, Johnny DeFrancesco, Kris Hill, Papa John DeFrancesco, the Sugar Thieves, the Lymbyc Systym, Landau Eugene Murphy Jr., Duke Jethro, David Hernandez, Joe Morris, The New Standards, Mega Ran, Michael Henderson, Alexander O'Neal, Haley Reinhart, Wayne Newton, and Rakim.

Marshall recorded the organ parts on Jody Gnant's album "Pivot," a part of Kyle MacDonald's One Red Paperclip project.

Marshall is based in Las Vegas, Nevada and is resident pianist for the MGM Mansion, a private gaming salon for players with at least $500,000 to spend.

== Discography ==
- Bob Corritore & Friends "Somebody Put Bad Luck On Me" (2023) - Hammond B3
- Jimi "Primetime" Smith & Bob Corritore "The World In A Jug" (2023) - Hammond B3
- Bob Corritore "You Shocked Me" (2022) - Hammond B3
- Austin Carthell "See the Upper 9" - Saxophone (2021)
- "Alive" Super Bowl ad for WealthSimple (2021) – Piano, Sax, Clarinet, Upright Bass
- Bob Corritore "Spider in my Stew" (2021) – Piano, Tenor Sax
- Brian Chartrand "Home At Last Vol. 1" (2020) – Tenor Sax
- Mark Zubia – Zubia (2021)
- Sugar Thieves "Anytown USA" "Dreamin'" and "Driftin' Away" (2020) – Harmonica, Baritone Sax, Tenor Sax, Piano, Hammond B3, Wurlitzer Electric Piano, Vocals
- Jeff Tuohy "Sea of Galilee" – Harmonica, Accordion
- Lee Perreira "Doctor's Orders" (2020) - Baritone Sax
- Kim Weston "Can We Do Again?" (2020) – Piano, composition
- Jim Bachmann "Arizona Burrito" (2019) – Accordion, Piano, Hammond B3, Sax
- House of Stairs "House of Stairs" (2018) – Tenor Sax, Bass Clarinet, Button Accordion
- Ingrid Hagelberg – "Les Origines de l'amour" (2017) – Clarinet, Accordion
- Captain Squeegee "Harmony Cure" (2017) – Baritone Sax
- Ben Anderson "Lukewarm" (2017) – Baritone Sax
- Blaine Long "Can't Change the Sun" (2015) – Piano, B3, Bass Clarinet
- Sugar Thieves "Sugar in the Raw" (2015) – Piano, B3, Wurlitzer, Sax, Harmonica, Upright Bass
- Pat Roberts & The Haymakers "Devil" – Piano (2014)
- Shorty Kreutz "Full Custom Boogie" – Piano, B3, sax (2014)
- Jay Tighe "Driven" – B3 (2014)
- Voodoo Swing "Fast Cars, Guitars, Tattoos and Scars" – Tenor Sax, Bass Sax, Piano – Electric Lotus (2012)
- Glenn Beck Presents "Believe Again" – Piano, B3 (2013)
- Rhythm Dragons – February 23, 1959 EP - Piano, B3, sax (2012)
- Sugar Thieves "Plywood Palace" (2012) – Piano, Rhodes, B3, Tenor Sax, Baritone Sax, Bouchedasse, Accordion, Bass Clarinet
- Village Blasting Club (Firebrass brass band) – Tenor Sax
- Kindread – Tenor Sax, Flute
- Cecile Hortensia "Papillons" – Saxes, Bass Clarinet, Accordion, Piano, Organ, Violin, Viola, Upright Bass – Electric Lotus (2012)
- Voodoo Swing "Europe Summer Tour 2012" – Piano, Organ, Tenor Sax – (European Release 2012)
- Graham Moseley – Piano, Organ, Rhodes (TBR)
- Bad Cactus Brass Band – Tenor Sax – (TBR)
- G Brothers "Step Up" – Piano, B3 (2012)
- Joe DiPadova & Shea Marshall "Root" – Keyboards, Sax – Gotsoul Recordings (2012)
- Sugar Thieves "How the Sugar Thieves Stole Christmas!" – Piano, Accordion, Clarinet, Bass Clarinet, Tenor Saxophone, Arrangement (2011)
- Justin Olson "Amber Waves" – Bass Clarinet, Oboe, Flute, Clarinet, Piano, Baritone Sax, Violin, Chromatic Harmonica, Penny Whistle – Electric Lotus (2013)
- Voodoo Swing – Fast Cars, Guitars, Tattoos & Scars - keyboards, sax (2012)
- Jen Vargas "All These Fires" – Piano, B3 – Electric Lotus (2012)
- Sugar Thieves "The Sugar Thieves" – Saxophones, Piano, B3, Clarinet, Chromatic Harmonica, Composition – (2011)
- "Of Blood and Gin (Soundtrack)" – Flute, Bass Clarinet – Short Film produced by Friar's Lantern Entertainment (2010)
- Oliver Night "Piece of Ground" – Bass Clarinet, Baritone Saxophone, Toy Piano, Chromatic Harmonica – (2010)
- Joe DiPadova & Shea Marshall feat Chris 'Sirraf' Farris "I Love It" – Keyboards – Seasons Limited (2010)
- Joe DiPadova "Consciousness" – Keyboards, Composition – Deeper Shades Recordings (2010)
- Paris James & The Common Revolution (self-titled) – Tenor Sax, Organ – Electric Lotus (2009)
- Sugar Thieves "Live at Sail Inn" – Saxophones, Keyboards, Composition – (2009)
- Austin Head (Untitled EP) – Baritone Saxophone – (2008)
- Jojoflores & Joe Dipadova “Yes Smoke” – Keyboards – Deeper Shades Recordings (2008)
- Mikel Lander & Meridith Moore “The Soulo Sessions” – Tenor Sax, Vocals - (2008)
- Daughters of Fission "M.O.T.H." – Tenor Sax – (2008)
- The Energy Trio “Live at Tempest” – B3, Synthesizer - (2007)
- Jody Gnant “Pivot” – B3 – Bogeso (2007)
- Attack of the Giant Squid “Ver” – Keyboards, Saxophones, Bass Clarinet, Flute, Composition – (2007)
- Drunken Immortals "Hot Concrete" – Saxes (2006)
- Interstate “Seventh Avenue at Midnight” – Saxophone - LytninBoy (2004)
- Soaking Fused “Traversal” – Saxophones, Flute – Ferocious Donkey (2003)
- The Irritating Stick “Pickin’ Up the Pace” – Organ - (2000)
