= Jody Marie Gnant =

American singer (born 1981)

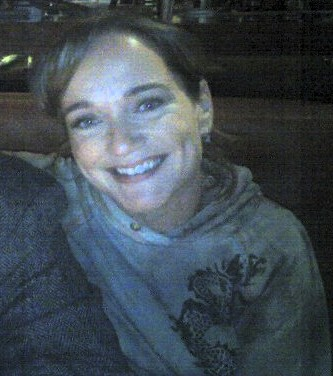
Gnant in 2008

Jody Marie Gnant (Note: In Gnant's name, the "g" is not silent) (born April 16, 1981) is an American singer-songwriter and pianist. In addition to her musical career, Gnant also owns an art gallery in Phoenix, Arizona.

== Life and career ==
Born in Hartland, Wisconsin, Gnant grew up in Scottsdale, Arizona. She first received attention when she co-composed and sang on the soundtrack to Cerise Casper's 1996 computer game, Treasure Quest starring Terry Farrell. Some of the songs were co-written by Grammy award-winning producer Richard Feldman. Gnant's tunes were instrumental during the game, and vocal excerpts appeared when certain objects were picked up. The full versions of the songs, though not the instrumentals, were included on a separate CD, Treasure Quest: The Soundtrack.

In the Phoenix area, she began performing her original, more personal work, which she labeled Bohemian Geek Soul, and moved to a newly renovated Phoenix arts district that was making the transition into a Bohemian artist community.

On July 12, 2005, Kyle MacDonald began a blog called One red paperclip in which he offered to trade a red paperclip and eventually traded up for a new place to live. One item he was eventually traded was a recording contract. When Gnant heard about this, she hurriedly looked for something to trade and eventually was able to offer MacDonald a room in her home with free rent for a year in exchange for the contract. The result of this was her second album, called Pivot, where she was supported by Adrian Goldenthal, Julian Goldenthal, Kris Hill, and Shea Marshall. Gnant was also able to meet numerous celebrities, including Alice Cooper and Corbin Bernsen.

In a 2008 appearance on MTV's Made, Gnant coached a tomboyish girl in vocal lessons so she could fulfill her dream of being a pageant queen.

== Lifecasting ==
On July 31, 2007, Gnant began lifecasting, streaming her life 24 hours a day, live on Ustream.tv. Less than a week after starting to lifecast, she had the No. 3 video on MySpace with 186,000 views. Her music is showcased nationwide as part of ScreenVison's pre-show entertainment in 4,000 movie theaters. Due to the lifecasting, Gnant's music reached a worldwide audience with international orders for her album, Pivot.

== Store buyout ==
On May 20, 2011, Jody Gnant, Kyle MacDonald, Hal Kirkland, Gary Lachance, and Fiddy, as part of Store Buyout, walked into Hercules Fancy Grocery in New York City and bought every single item on store shelves using $20,000 in credit card cash advances in an effort to save the store from going out of business. The items were then turned into art and displayed in an art gallery in NYC.

== Award ==
She won a Best of Phoenix Award in 2006.
