= Matt Clackson =

Canadian-born American ice hockey player

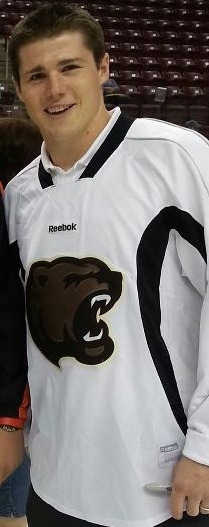
- Clackson with the Hershey Bears in 2012
- Born: April 26, 1985 (age 41) Saskatoon, Saskatchewan, Canada
- Height: 6 ft 0 in (183 cm)
- Weight: 190 lb (86 kg; 13 st 8 lb)
- Position: Left wing
- Shot: Right
- Played for: Philadelphia Phantoms; Adirondack Phantoms; Chicago Wolves; Hershey Bears; Portland Pirates
- NHL draft: 215th overall, 2005; Philadelphia Flyers
- Playing career: 2008–2013

Matthew Clackson (born April 26, 1985) is a Canadian-born American former professional ice hockey right winger who played six seasons in the American Hockey League (AHL) for five different teams. His father, Kim Clackson, played in the National Hockey League (NHL) and World Hockey Association (WHA) for the Pittsburgh Penguins, Indianapolis Racers, and Quebec Nordiques.

== Playing career ==
Clackson attended Peters Township High School in McMurray, Pennsylvania, and played for the school's varsity ice hockey team, winning two Pennsylvania State AA Ice Hockey Championships. He was a teammate of NHLer Christian Hanson at Peters Township. After high school, he played two seasons of Junior A with the Chicago Steel of the United States Hockey League (USHL) and was selected 215th overall in the 2005 NHL entry draft by the Philadelphia Flyers.

Following his draft, he spent three seasons with Western Michigan University of the NCAA circuit. After his junior season, he decided to forgo his senior year by signing with the Flyers on March 19, 2008. That same day, he was assigned to the Philadelphia Phantoms of the American Hockey League (AHL); he played two games with the AHL team to close out the 2008–09 season. Clackson then played three full seasons with the Philadelphia/Adirondack Phantoms, re-signing with the Flyers following the 2009–10 season.

On June 7, 2011, Clackson was packaged into a trade that sent him, a 2012 third round draft pick and future considerations, to the Phoenix Coyotes, in exchange for goaltender Ilya Bryzgalov. Failing to come to terms with the Coyotes on a new contract, he became an unrestricted free agent on July 1. Several months later, he was invited to the Vancouver Canucks on a tryout basis during the team's training camp.

On July 14, 2012, Clackson signed a one-year deal with the Washington Capitals, earning $525,000 at the NHL level and $75,000 at the AHL level.

On April 2, 2013, he was traded from Washington to the Phoenix Coyotes in return of Joel Rechlicz.

== NHL video explanation ==
During the 2011-12 pre-season, Clackson was illegally hit from behind by Calgary Flames forward Pierre-Luc Letourneau-Leblond. In handing down a five-game suspension against Letourneau-Leblond, Brendan Shanahan, the new head of NHL discipline, posted on the NHL website video of the hit on Clackson to illustrate his ruling - the first of what would become Shanahan's trademark video explanations.

== Career statistics ==
			Regular season					Playoffs
Season	Team	League	GP	G	A	Pts	PIM	GP	G	A	Pts	PIM
2001–02	Pittsburgh Hornets	18U AAA	—	—	—	—	—	—	—	—	—	—
2002–03	Pittsburgh Hornets	18U AAA	64	22	22	44	169	—	—	—	—	—
2002–03	Peters Township High School	HSPA	—	—	—	—	—	—	—	—	—	—
2003–04	Chicago Steel	USHL	42	5	4	9	108	5	0	1	1	8
2004–05	Chicago Steel	USHL	56	10	15	25	270	8	0	2	2	26
2005–06	Western Michigan University	CCHA	34	1	1	2	52	—	—	—	—	—
2006–07	Western Michigan University	CCHA	36	0	8	8	80	—	—	—	—	—
2007–08	Western Michigan University	CCHA	35	3	3	6	87	—	—	—	—	—
2007–08	Philadelphia Phantoms	AHL	2	0	0	0	19	—	—	—	—	—
2008–09	Philadelphia Phantoms	AHL	80	3	6	9	263	4	0	0	0	4
2009–10	Adirondack Phantoms	AHL	60	2	4	6	174	—	—	—	—	—
2010–11	Adirondack Phantoms	AHL	62	1	3	4	118	—	—	—	—	—
2011–12	Chicago Wolves	AHL	43	1	1	2	193	1	0	0	0	2
2012–13	Hershey Bears	AHL	19	1	2	3	36	—	—	—	—	—
2012–13	Portland Pirates	AHL	4	0	0	0	30	—	—	—	—	—
AHL totals			270	8	16	24	833	5	0	0	0	6
