= Venetia, Pennsylvania =

Unincorporated community in Pennsylvania, US

- Unincorporated community
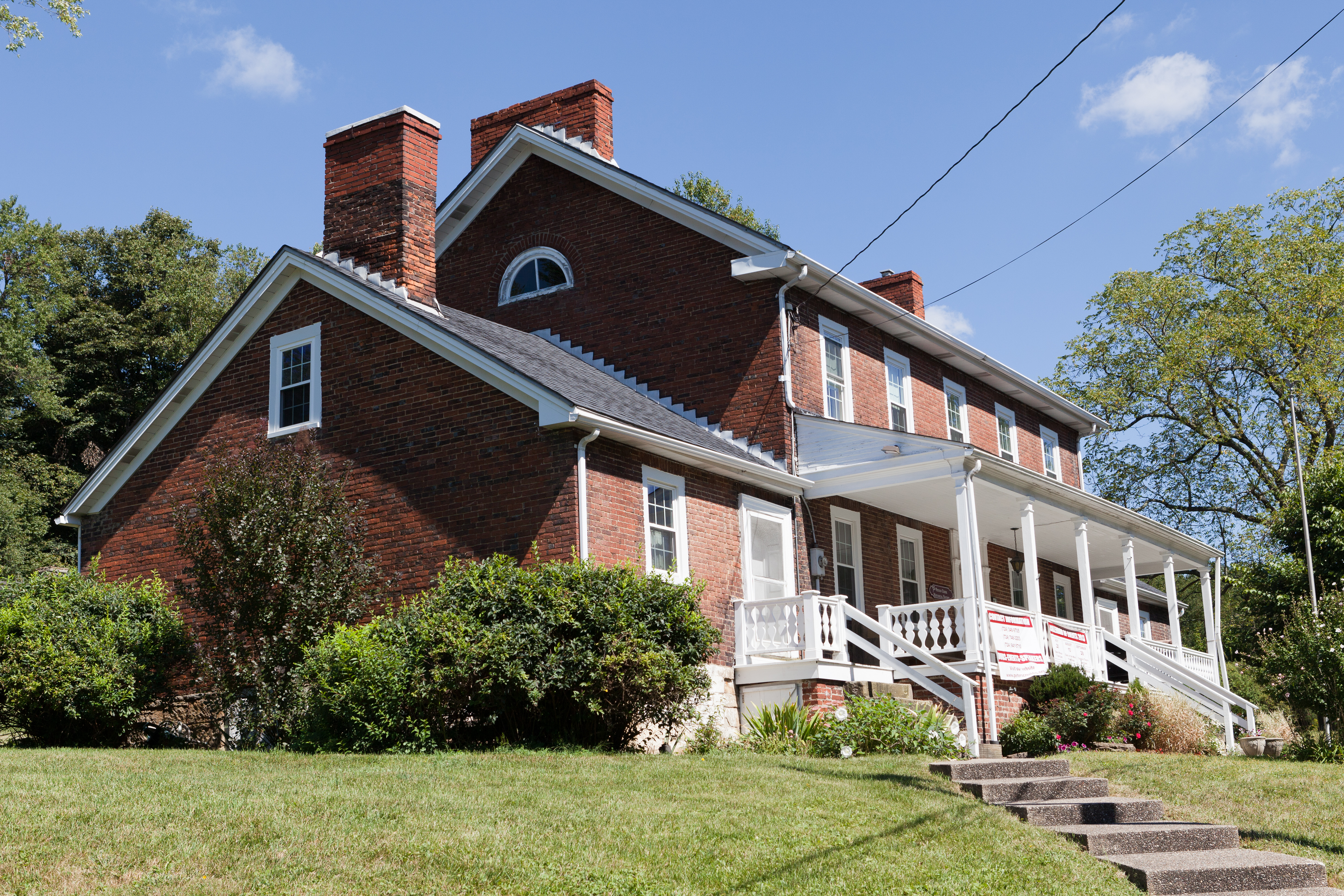
- Enoch Wright House

- Location within the state of Pennsylvania
- Coordinates: 40°14′48″N 80°02′34″W
- Country: United States
- State: Pennsylvania
- County: Washington
- Elevation: 994 ft (303 m)

Population (2010)
  - Total: 8,731
- Time zone: UTC-5 (Eastern (EST))
  - Summer (DST): UTC-4 (EDT)
- Area code: 724
- GNIS feature ID: 1190376

Venetia is an unincorporated community in Peters Township, Washington County, Pennsylvania, United States. It has a post office with the ZIP code 15367, covering most of the area between McMurray and Gastonville. The population of this area was 8,731 at the 2010 census. It is part of the Pittsburgh metropolitan area.
