= Peters Township, Washington County, Pennsylvania =

Township in Pennsylvania, US

Coordinates: 40°16′30″N 80°5′30″W

Peters Township, Pennsylvania
- Township
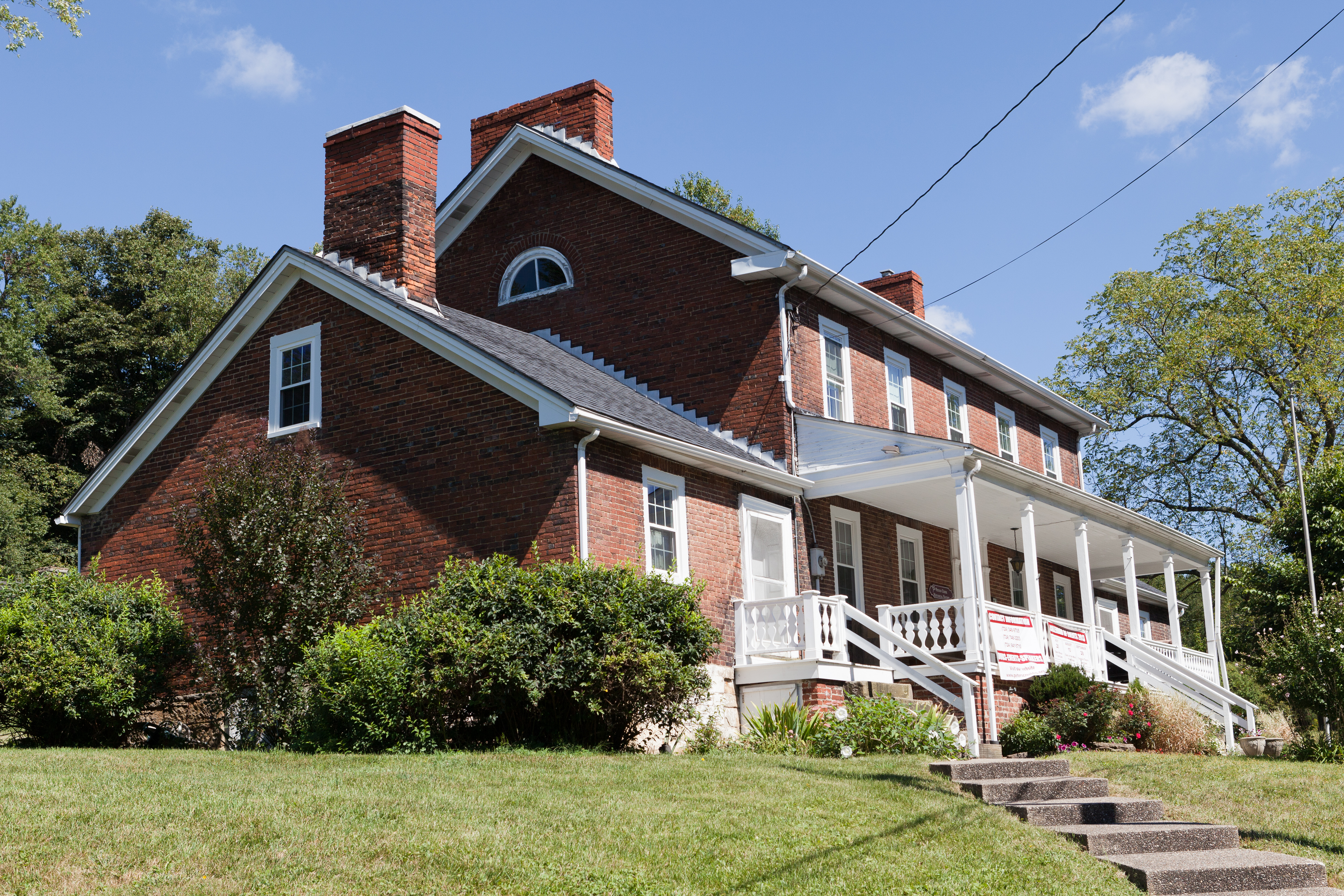
- The Enoch Wright House on Venetia Road

- Logo

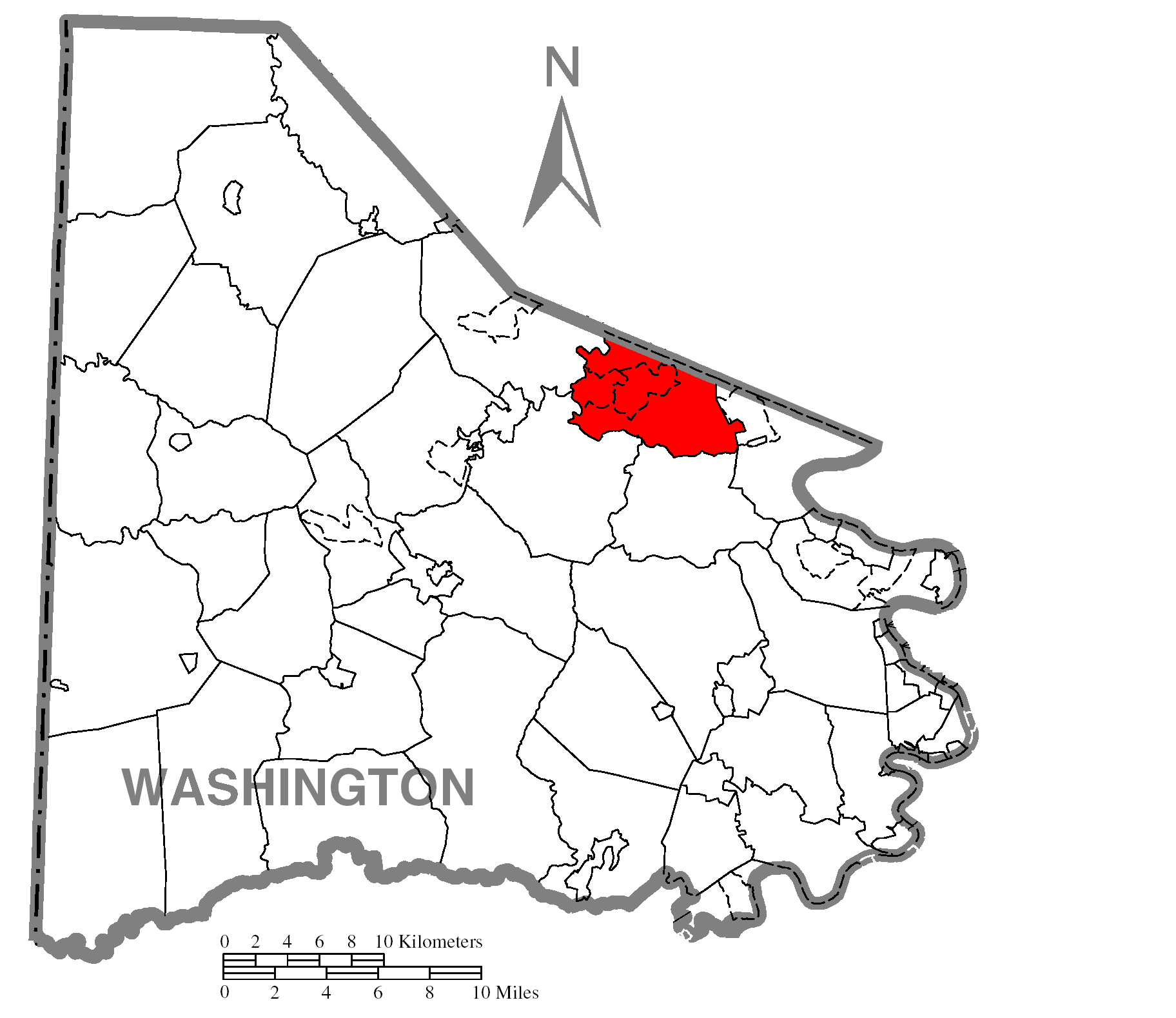
- Map of Washington County, Pennsylvania highlighting Peters Township

- Map of Washington County, Pennsylvania
- Country: United States
- State: Pennsylvania
- County: Washington
- Established: 1781

Government
  - Type: Council
  - Chairman: Gary Stiegel, Jr.

Area
  - Total: 19.70 sq mi (51.01 km^{2})
  - Land: 19.52 sq mi (50.55 km^{2})
  - Water: 0.18 sq mi (0.46 km^{2})

Population (2020)
  - Total: 22,946
  - Estimate (2024): 23,248
  - Density: 1,176/sq mi (453.9/km^{2})
- Time zone: UTC-5 (Eastern (EST))
  - Summer (DST): UTC-4 (EDT)
- Area code: 724
- FIPS code: 42-125-59608
- Website: http://www.peterstownship.com/

Peters Township is a township in Washington County, Pennsylvania, United States. The population was 22,946 at the 2020 census. It is a suburb of the Pittsburgh metropolitan area.

== History ==
Peters Township was incorporated in 1781 as one of Washington County's thirteen original townships. It had fallen within the area claimed by Virginia as its Yohogania County before the resolution of that state's boundary dispute with Pennsylvania. Over the years, portions of Peters Township were sectioned off to form other municipalities; eventually, leaving the present configuration of 19.5 square miles (51 km^{2}).

Peters Township was named after William "Indian" Peters. Peters, also known as "Mohawk Peter" may have been a Native American though this is uncertain.

Some of the first settlers were James and Joshua Wright, James Matthews, John Sweringer, Rev. David Phillips, Andrew Dunlevy, Daniel Townsend, William Fife and Robert Bell. Peters was initially a farming community and then later on coal became a major industry that resulted in the development of Hackett, presently a small settlement 1.2 miles (2 km) east of Venetia.

Peters Township remained a sparsely populated rural community until the 1950s. In 1950 the population was 3,004. By 2000, this number had increased to 17,556. In 1976, the township's home rule charter became effective. This altered the form of government from the prevalent Second Class Township Supervisor format to the present Council-Manager form.

The township's current arrowhead logo was adopted with the new home rule charter. An arrowhead found in Peters Township was adopted as the pattern.

Peterswood Park, located in the township, is home to the Peters Township Recreation Center, as well as several football, baseball, softball, and soccer fields. In addition, there is an amphitheater as well as several pavilions.

The Enoch Wright House was listed on the National Register of Historic Places in 2007.

== Geography ==
According to the United States Census Bureau, the township has a total area of 19.7 square miles (51.0 km^{2}), of which 19.5 square miles (50.6 km^{2}) is land and 0.2 square miles (0.5 km^{2}) is water. The main thoroughfares in Peters Township are U.S. Route 19 heading north and south, and East McMurray Road heading east and west.

=== Communities ===
Peters Township is made up of three sub-communities. These are:

- McMurray, to the north-western direction, and
- Thompsonville, also in the northwest
- Venetia, to the south-eastern direction.

=== Surrounding neighborhoods ===
Peters Township has six borders, including Upper St. Clair Township and Bethel Park (both in Allegheny County) to the north, Union Township to the east, Nottingham Township to the south, North Strabane Township to the south and southwest, and Cecil Township to the west.

== Demographics ==
Historical population
Census	Pop.	Note	%±
2000	17,566		—
2010	21,213		20.8%
2020	22,946		8.2%
2025 (est.)	23,262		1.4%
U.S. Decennial Census

=== 2000 census ===
As of the census of 2000, there were 17,566 people, 6,026 households, and 5,091 families living in the township. The population density was 896.6 inhabitants per square mile (346.2/km^{2}). There were 6,221 housing units at an average density of 317.5 per square mile (122.6/km^{2}). The racial makeup of the township was 97.81% White, 0.48% African American, 0.03% Native American, 1.09% Asian, 0.03% Pacific Islander, 0.20% from other races, and 0.37% from two or more races. Hispanic or Latino of any race were 0.72% of the population.

There were 6,026 households, out of which 41.8% had children under the age of 18 living with them, 77.5% were married couples living together, 5.2% had a female householder with no husband present, and 15.5% were non-families. 13.8% of all households were made up of individuals, and 6.1% had someone living alone who was 65 years of age or older. The average household size was 2.87 and the average family size was 3.17.

The population spread consisted of 29.4% under the age of 18, 4.1% from 18 to 24, 25.4% from 25 to 44, 28.2% from 45 to 64, and 13.0% who were 65 years of age or older. The median age was 41 years. For every 100 females there were 94.3 males. For every 100 females age 18 and over, there were 91.6 males.

The median income for a household in the township was $102,320 and the median income for a family was $108,246 (2007 estimate). The per capita income for the township was $36,606. About 1.1% of families and 1.7% of the population were below the poverty line, including 1.1% of those under age 18 and 1.5% of those age 65 or over.

=== 2010 census ===
As of the census of 2010, there were 21,213 people, 7,292 households, and 6,079 families living in the township. The population density was 1,071.4 inhabitants per square mile (413.7/km^{2}). There were 7,559 housing units at an average density of 381.8 per square mile (147.4/km^{2}). The racial makeup of the township was 96.2% White, 0.5% African American, 0.1% Native American, 2.0% Asian, 0.3% from other races, and 0.9% from two or more races. Hispanic or Latino of any race were 1.5% of the population.

Of the 7,292 total households, 40.7% had children under the age of 18 living with them, 75.3% were married couples living together, 5.4% had a female householder with no husband present, and 16.6% were non-families. 14.2% of all households were made up of individuals, and 5.9% had someone living alone who was 65 years of age or older. The average household size was 2.88 and the average family size was 3.20.

The average income per household is $155,752. In the township the population was spread out, with 31.1% under the age of 18, 2.7% from 18 to 24, 19.7% from 25 to 44, 33.1% from 45 to 64, and 13.4% who were 65 years of age or older. The median age was 43 years. For every 100 females there were 96.7 males. For every 100 women age 18 and over, there were 93.3 men.

== Community services ==
=== Fire department ===
The Peters Township Fire Department, originally established in 1937 as an all-volunteer organization, has grown to a combination department with a total of 45 career and volunteer firefighters. The department operates out of three fire stations within the township and maintains a fleet of three engines, one heavy rescue, one 109' aerial quint, and a number of specialized squads. The department provides emergency response for fire, rescue, emergency medical and other requests to Peters Township and surrounding residents.

== Education ==
The Peters Township School District has two elementary schools (Bower Hill Elementary School and Pleasant Valley Elementary School) that educate students in grades K-3. These elementary schools are split for the individual communities (McMurray and Venetia for Pleasant Valley and Bower Hill respectively).

The secondary elementary school (McMurray Elementary School) educates students in grades 4–5. The Peters Township Middle School educates students in grades 6–8. The Peters Township High School educates students in grades 9-12.

== Notable person ==
- Guy Reschenthaler – U.S. representative, former Pennsylvania state senator
