= Aurora: Operation Intercept =

- Directed by: Paul Levine
- Written by: Paul Levine
- Starring: Bruce Payne; Lance Henriksen; Corbin Bernsen
- Release date: 1995
- Running time: 94 minutes
- Country: United States
- Language: English

Aurora: Operation Intercept is a 1995 American thriller film directed by Paul Levine and starring Bruce Payne, Lance Henriksen and John Stockwell.

The "Aurora" is a secret hypersonic military aircraft based at Groom Lake. It is very similar to what aviation experts assume to be the Aurora aircraft. In the film, it is being stolen by a Russian terrorist who tries to destroy the White House. The propulsion system is a "combined cycle" conventional/scramjet engine.

== Summary ==
Francesca Zaborszin (Natalya Andrejchenko) believes that the U.S. government murdered her father (Curt Lowens), a Soviet scientist and defector, and made it look like suicide.

Francesca sets up her base in the deserts of Kazakhstan, wielding powerful electromagnetic pulses channeled through orbiting GPS satellites to attack and bring down civilian aircraft. She also captures the revolutionary high-altitude fighter-bomber Aurora One.

Summoned to strike back are Major Paul Gordon Pruitt (Bruce Payne) and Major Andy Aldrich (John Stockwell), who soar into action in Aurora Two. Forced down by Zaborszin, the pair are caught and tortured by her private army of sinister Slavs, but Pruitt escapes.

Eventually, things lead both Francesca and Pruitt to take to the skies in separate Auroras. She penetrates D.C. airspace to make a bombing run at the White House, but Pruitt's afterburners cause Francesca's jet to barrel roll and explode, killing Francesca.

== Cast ==
- Bruce Payne as Gordon Pruett
- Natalya Andrejchenko as Francesca Zaborszin
- Lance Henriksen as William Stenghel
- Corbin Bernsen as Flight Engineer Murphy
- Curt Lowens as Dr. Zaborszin
- John Stockwell as Andy Aldrich
- Michael Champion as Johann Wells
- Dennis Christopher as Victor Varenkov
- Corinne Bohrer as Sharon Pruett

== Significance ==
Commentators have noted that since the making of the film, reality has imitated fiction, in that the September 11 attacks involved the crashing of planes into strategic buildings.
