= Rust (2010 film) =

2010 film by Corbin Bernsen

Rust is a 2010 drama written and directed by Corbin Bernsen, which was released direct-to-video on October 5, 2010. The film takes place in the town of Kipling, Saskatchewan, Canada with many local citizens in prominent roles. Rust was inspired by Bernsen's own spiritual journey after his father, Harry Bernsen, died in 2008.

== Cast ==
- Corbin Bernsen as James Moore
- Lloyd Allen Warner as Travis
- Frank Gall as Glen Moore
- Audrey Tennant as Mary
- Kirsten Collins as Amanda (song Could You Imagine in the credits)
- Judith Davies as Mrs. Wexler
- Ryder Debreceni as Ian
