= Donna on Demand =

- One Sheet
- Directed by: Corbin Bernsen
- Written by: Corbin Bernsen
- Produced by: Chris Aronoff; Collin Bernsen; Corbin Bernsen
- Starring: Corbin Bernsen; Adrienne Frantz; Susan Ruttan
- Cinematography: Eric G. Petersen
- Music by: Stephen Greaves
- Production companies: Team Cherokee Productions; Antibody Films
- Release date: September 15, 2009
- Running time: 93 minutes
- Country: United States
- Language: English

Donna on Demand is a 2009 direct-to-video dark comedy film written, directed, co-produced by, and starring Corbin Bernsen. The film was released on DVD on September 15, 2009. It takes place in Los Angeles, California.

It is most notable for being the subject of the final two trades made by Kyle MacDonald in his attempt to turn one red paperclip into a house by barter alone. On or about June 2, 2006, he traded a KISS motorised snow globe to Bernsen for a role in the movie; a month later, on or about July 5, he traded the role away for a farmhouse in Kipling, Saskatchewan. During celebrations in Kipling related to the trade, auditions were held for the role and it ultimately went to Nolan Hubbard (a recent high school graduate at the time).

== Cast ==
- Corbin Bernsen as Ben Corbin
- Lyndsay Brill as The Redhead
- Jeanne Cooper as Virginia Hart
- Charles Dennis as Charlie
- Joseph DeVito as Crazy Fan
- Neil Dickson as Tony
- Steve Fite as Lone Guy
- Adrienne Frantz as Donna
- Nolan Hubbard as Ned / Prime8
- Dan Lauria as Detective Lewis
- Devin Mills as Victoria
- Annabelle Milne as Lone Girl
- Brock Morse as Camera Guy
- Paul Renteria as Paulo
- Jason Rogel as Utility Nerd
- Susan Ruttan as Rose
- Brad Surosky as Cyber Nerd
- William Tempel as Surly Fan
- Scott Vance as Limp Dick
- Larry Varanelli as Detective Clark
- J.W. Wallace as Monkey Mask

== See also ==
- One red paperclip
