= Chuck Marohnic =

American jazz pianist and educator

Chuck Marohnic is an American jazz pianist and educator, known for his association with Chet Baker. He received his B.A. from Bellarmine College and a Masters in Music from the University of Miami. Early in his career, Chuck also worked as a sideman with Ira Sullivan, Joe Henderson, Jamey Aebersold, Buddy Rich, and many others. He has served as a visiting clinician and performer at festivals in Germany, Brazil and France. For five years he acted as Coordinator of Jazz Studies and a guest artist at the Fairbanks Summer Arts Festival in Fairbanks, Alaska. He was the director of jazz studies at Arizona State University from 1981 to 2003 and has published several jazz instruction books in addition to recording.

His former students include John Medeski of Medeski, Martin and Wood; Scott Henderson of Tribal Tech; Phil Strange, formerly with Joe Henderson; German pianist Klaus Ignatzek; Tim Ray, pianist for Lyle Lovett; Anna Maria Mottola, pianist for the United States Marine Band; Raul Yanez; Shea Marshall; Jacob Koller and Joey Sellers.

== Discography ==
- Copenhagen Suite (Steeplechase, 1979)
- Permutations (Steeplechase, 1981)
- Pages of Stone (ITM Pacific, 1991)
- Now Alone (ITM Pacific, 1991)
- Many Mansions (A Records, 1998)
- Jazz! (Summit, 1998)
- White Men Can't Monk (Summit, 2001)
- Trios (CDBaby, 2006)
