= Public Media Works =

Public Media Works is a Delaware corporation headquartered in Van Nuys, California. Founded in 2000 by actor Corbin Bernsen, the company engages in the development, production, marketing and distribution of "tailor made" entertainment for specifically targeted, fan-based audiences. This entertainment includes film and television, and may also include music, theater and sports.

In 2011, the company filed for Chapter 11 bankruptcy protection.

== Films ==
- Carpool Guy, 2005 - a film targeted at soap opera fans and released on DVD.
- Dead Air, 2008
- The Wine of Summer, 2012

== Articles ==
- "Public Media Works Executes Term Sheet for Purchase of Antibody Films". Business Wire. March 27, 2007. Archived from the original on April 5, 2008 – via FindArticles.
