= Trade Me Project =

Web series on TikTok

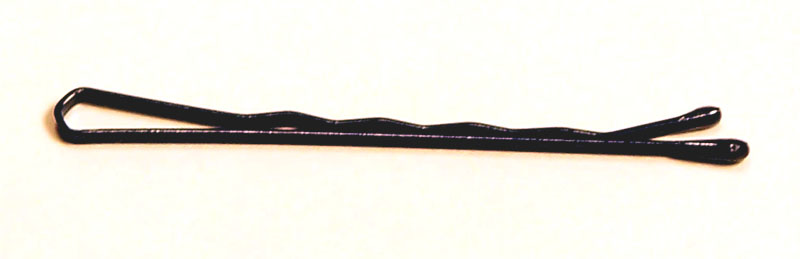
- A bobby pin, like this one, was the item Skipper offered in her first trade
- Created by: Demi Skipper
- Inspired by: One Red Paperclip

Original release
- Network: TikTok
- Release: May 18, 2020 – present

The Trade Me Project is a TikTok account created by Demi Skipper that traded a bobby pin for a house. The project began as a TikTok series on May 18, 2020. The idea for the project is based on the project by Kyle MacDonald that traded a red paperclip for a house. The idea is not to directly trade a bobby pin for a house, but instead to trade it for an item worth slightly more, and to repeat the process with each new item, until making a trade for a house.

The series concluded in December 2021 when Demi Skipper made her last trade for a house, with a total of 28 trades having been made. Skipper states that she plans to renovate the house, and then "trade the house for a bobby-pin". Adding, "I'm going to give the house away to somebody who really needs it". She has also said that, after giving the house away, she plans to attempt it a second time.

== Trades ==
Skipper took 28 trades and around a year and a half to trade her way up from the bobby pin to the house. She constrained herself to not make trades with any person she already knew, and not to use money in any transaction. However, she would cover shipping expenses when they applied, using some of the money she generated from TikTok revenue to fund the cost. Skipper said she spent hours researching trades, which she contrasted with the short-form nature of her TikTok posts that were one minute long. Skipper also noted the trust necessary for the project to work, hoping that others would follow through with trades after items were shipped out. She said that no one had ever scammed her in such a way. The initial trades were made around San Francisco, before including trades made across the United States. The final trade was for a house outside Nashville, Tennessee on November 26, 2021.

The trades had some controversies among her fans. Her choice to trade a set of three tractors for Chipotle Celebrity Cards, valued at about $20,000, drew criticism from her followers. Viewers said she would never be able to trade it with someone for an item of comparable value. She later traded the card for an off-the-grid home worth about $40,000.

The final trade came from a viewer of Skipper's; she was a house flipper. She had been waiting for the "right trade" to make an offer. The house was valued at 79,800.

=== List of trades ===
Trade No.	Item	Value (USD)	Citation
1	Bobby pin	0.01	
2	Pair of Mary Sol earrings	10	
3	4 margarita glasses	24	
4	Bissel vacuum cleaner	60	
5	Snowboard	95	
6	Apple TV 4K	180	
7	Bose noise-cancelling wireless headphones	220	
8	X-Box One (including accessories)	320	
9	Macbook Pro	400	
10	Canon T6 camera (including accessories)	550	
11	Nike Blazer shoes	750	
12	Nike Hyperdunk shoes	850	
13	Nike Air Jordan 1 shoes	950	
14	iPhone 11 Pro Max	1,050	
15	2008 Dodge Grand Caravan	1,000	
16	Boosted Plus electric skateboard	1,200	
17	Macbook Pro (newer than in previous trade)	1,800	
18	Food cart bike	3,800	
19	2006 Mini Cooper Convertible	5,000	
20	Diamond and sapphire necklace	1,600	
21	Peloton bike	1,800	
22	2006 Ford Mustang GT Deluxe	4,500	
23	2011 Jeep Patriot Sport	6,000	
24	Tiny cabin	10,000	
25	2011 Honda CR-V	11,500	
26	3 tractors	12,600	
27	Chipotle Celebrity Cards	18,250	
28	Off-grid trailer	40,000	
29	House	80,000	

== Reactions ==
Skipper's account received one million followers within the first week.

She received help from her fans storing and transporting items throughout the duration of the project. She also received several negative comments from others. She thanked her husband for supporting her throughout the journey, and said that the negative comments added to her resolve to complete the project so she could prove them wrong. Skipper stated she would receive 1,000 messages on Instagram every day, often with offers to support the project without proposing a trade.

== Aftermath ==
Skipper gave the house away and said in a January 2026 TikTok that it had been subsequently "completely trashed". She then reached out to a local nonprofit organization, and domain.com.au noted, "It's not clear whether Skipper donated the house to the organisation". Inspired by the non-profit's work and the potential good in gifting a house to a person or organization in need, Skipper has embarked on a second challenge.
