= Patricia Tallman =

American actress and stunt performer

- Tallman at Dragon Con in 2026
- Born: Patricia J. Tallman; September 4, 1957 (age 69); Pontiac, Illinois, U.S.
- Other names: Pat J. Tallman; Pat Tallman
- Education: Carnegie Mellon University (BFA)
- Occupations: Actress; stunt performer
- Years active: 1980–present
- Known for: Babylon 5 Night of the Living Dead; Generations
- Spouse(s): Jeffrey Willerth (m. 1999; div. 2008), Glenn Morrissey (m. 2022)
- Partner: J. Michael Straczynski (2002–2013)
- Children: 1

Patricia J. Tallman (born September 4, 1957) is an American actress, stunt performer, and studio executive best known for her roles in Night of the Living Dead, Star Trek and Babylon 5.

== Early life and education ==
Patricia Tallman is the daughter of Jerry Tallman, a radio entertainer. After graduating from Glenbard West High School in Glen Ellyn, Illinois in 1975, she joined the theater arts program of Carnegie Mellon University, which awarded her a Bachelor of Fine Arts degree.

== Career ==
In television, Tallman worked on the soap opera Generations. Later, she had guest-starring roles on Tales from the Darkside, as well as the science-fiction shows Star Trek: The Next Generation, Star Trek: Deep Space Nine, and Star Trek: Voyager. As an actress and stunt performer, she worked on 50 episodes across the Star Trek franchise. Tallman played Lyta Alexander in the Babylon 5 series pilot, recurring in seasons two and three, and starring in seasons four and five. Tallman collaborated with fellow Carnegie Mellon alumnus George A. Romero on several films, including Knightriders, Monkey Shines, and Creepshow 2 (in which Tallman performed stunts).

In 1990, Tallman starred as Barbara in the Tom Savini-directed remake of the 1968 film Night of the Living Dead. In 1992, she played the Possessed Witch under heavy make-up in the cult classic Army of Darkness, as well as the Witch in the modern day scenes.

In 1993, Tallman's most notable stunt work came as stunt double for Laura Dern throughout Steven Spielberg's Jurassic Park. In addition, she served as stunt double for Laurel Holloman, who portrayed vampire hunter Justine Cooper in the series Angel; a photo of Tallman was also used as the photo of Justine Cooper's dead twin sister. In a 2001 episode of the TV series Sheena, she guest-starred as the villain Caroline Dula.

Tallman appeared in the 2002 psychological horror short Jennifer Is Dead, the black comedy For Pete's Wake!, and guest spots on Without a Trace and Castle. Tallman appeared in InAlienable (2008) and the horror film Dead Air (2009). Tallman played Holly in Atlas Shrugged: Part II (2012).

Tallman has performed voice roles including playing the leading part of evil detective Jean Richmond in the Radio Repertory Company of America's production of Lives of the Cat and in some of the Anne Manx sequels (sold as radio plays on CD).

In 2011, Tallman published her autobiography Pleasure Thresholds, the title inspired by the scene she auditioned to earn the role of Lyta Alexander.

In 2012, Tallman became CEO and executive producer of Studio JMS in partnership with her then-boyfriend, J. Michael Straczynski, the creator of Babylon 5. In 2013, she left the company.

In May 2014, Tallman played the male role of Lespere in a theatrical production of Ray Bradbury's Kaleidoscope at Sci-Fest LA 2014, a theater festival. The following year Tallman played the wife in a comedy called A Logic Called Joe at the second Sci-Fest LA.

In 2016, Tallman started Quest Retreats, a VIP adventure excursion company with annual events in Hawaii, London, New Zealand, and South Africa.

== Personal life ==
Tallman met Andrea Rogantini when he was the executive chef at Prego Ristorante in Los Angeles. Rogantini is the father of her only child, a son named Julian Tallman. Tallman later met Jeffrey Willerth when she was acting on Babylon 5 (1993–1998), where he was an associate producer. They were married in 1999, separated several years later and divorced in 2008.

Tallman met J. Michael Straczynski (JMS) when she was acting on Babylon 5, a series which he created. The two entered into a relationship some time after Straczynski separated from his wife, Kathryn M. Drennan, in 2002. They separated in 2013.

Tallman married actor and writer Glenn Morrissey in 2022.

Tallman is a leading fund-raiser for Penny Lane, a center for abused children in California. As of 2017, she has been leading their annual “Be a Santa Toy Drive” for more than 20 years.

== Selected filmography ==
Year	Title	Role	Notes
1981	Knightriders	Julie	
1982	Stuck on You!	Queen Guenevere	
1988	Tales from the Darkside	Janice Perry	Episode: "Family Reunion"
1988	Monkey Shines	Party Guest	
1989	Generations	Christy Russell	12 episodes
1989	Road House	Bandstand Babe	
1989	Hard Time on Planet Earth	Frances	
1990	Night of the Living Dead	Barbara	
1990	The Flash	Kidnapper	
1992	Army of Darkness	Possessed Witch	
1992	Der Ring der Musketiere	Woman Imposter	TV film
1992	Sweet Justice	Josie	
1993	Babylon 5: The Gathering	Lyta Alexander	TV film
1993	Benefit of the Doubt	Karen's Mother	
1993	Jurassic Park	Laura Dern's Stunt Double	
1992–1993	Star Trek: The Next Generation	Alien #2 / Kiros / Security Officer	3 episodes (uncredited stunt work)
1993–1996	Star Trek: Deep Space Nine	Nurse Tagana / Weapons Officer / Nima	3 episodes (uncredited stunt work)
1994	Clifford	Flight Attendant on Rolling Cart	
1993–1998	Babylon 5	Lyta Alexander	47 episodes
1996–1997	Star Trek: Voyager	Taresian Woman / Operations Division Officer	2 episodes (uncredited stunt work)
1998	Babylon 5: Thirdspace	Lyta Alexander	TV film
2001	Sheena	Caroline Dula	Episode: "The Darkness"
2004–2007	Without a Trace	Linda / Latte Woman / Off-Duty Police Officer	3 episodes (uncredited)
2007	For Pete's Wake!	Alisa Fox	
2008	InAlienable	Dr. Klein	
2009	Dead Air	Lucy	
2010	Castle	Vivian Marchand (uncredited)	Episode: "He's Dead, She's Dead"
2012	Atlas Shrugged: Part II	Holly	
2014	Criminal Minds	Captain Margot Nolan	Episode: "A Thousand Suns"
2017	Rose Is a Rose Is a Rose	Rose Jensen	
2023	Babylon 5: The Road Home	Lyta Alexander	Voice; Direct-to-Video
