= Devin Mills =

American actress

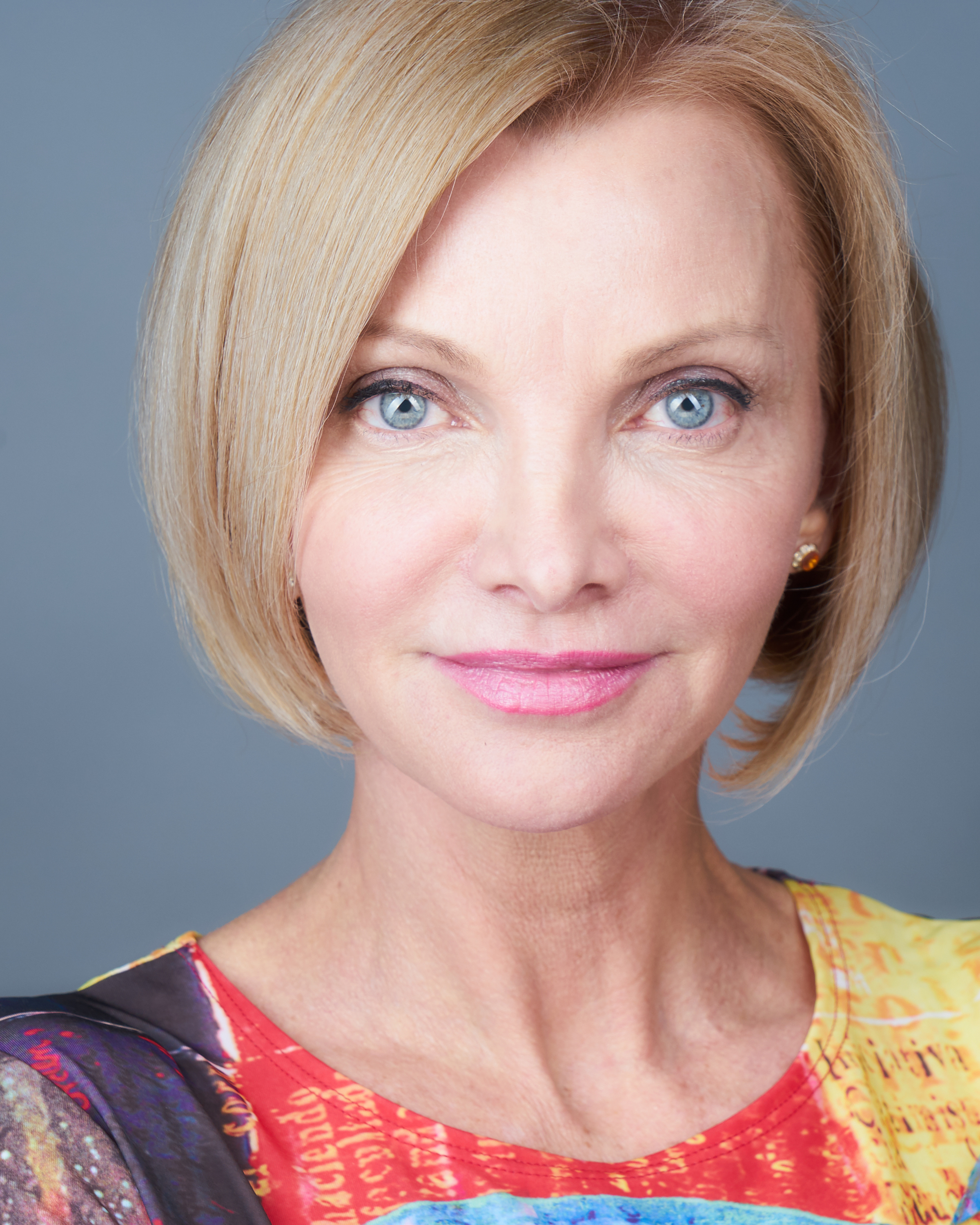
- Occupation: Actress
- Known for: Dating in the Middle Ages

Devin Mills is an American actress. She created the online series Dating In The Middle Ages, a musical comedy about a divorced historical romance novelist (Samanta Collins, played by Mills) who is returning to the dating scene.

In 2006, Mills appeared in the short film Shank. Mills played on the television series General Hospital in 2008 and Days of Our Lives in 2009 as well as Big Love and The O.C.. In 2011, she appeared in the short Party Foul.

== Filmography ==
Date	Title	Role	Notes
1988	Outlaw Force	Jesse	
1989	Terrifying Tales		Video
2003	The O.C.	Karen	TV series
2005	Devil's Punchbowl	Constance	Short
2006	Shank	Marilyn	Short
2007	The HBO Voyeur Project	Housewife	TV mini-series
2007	Big Love	LDS 'Latter-Day Saints' Woman	TV series
2007	Seven Days	Heather	Short
2008	General Hospital	Wedding Planner	TV series
2009	Days of Our Lives	Flight Attendant	TV series
2009	Donna on Demand	Victoria	
2011	Party Foul	Cougar Sister Cinnamon	Short
2012	My Guy Cary Grant	Samantha	Short
2011-2013	Dating in the Middle Ages	Samantha Collins	TV series, Creator/Writer
2015-2016	F#@K I Love U	Cynthia Winston	TV series
2017	With a Kiss I Die	Farryn's Mom	
2018-2019	Meet and Whine	Herself	Web series, 15 episodes
2019	Artista Obscura	Silvia Fancyfeast	TV movie
2019	Ish Hashuv Meod	Real Estate Agent	Israeli TV Series
2020	Beef House	Lana	TV series
2020	Wedding Screeners	Helen Belchek	
