= Enoch Wright House =

Historic house in Pennsylvania, United States

- U.S. National Register of Historic Places
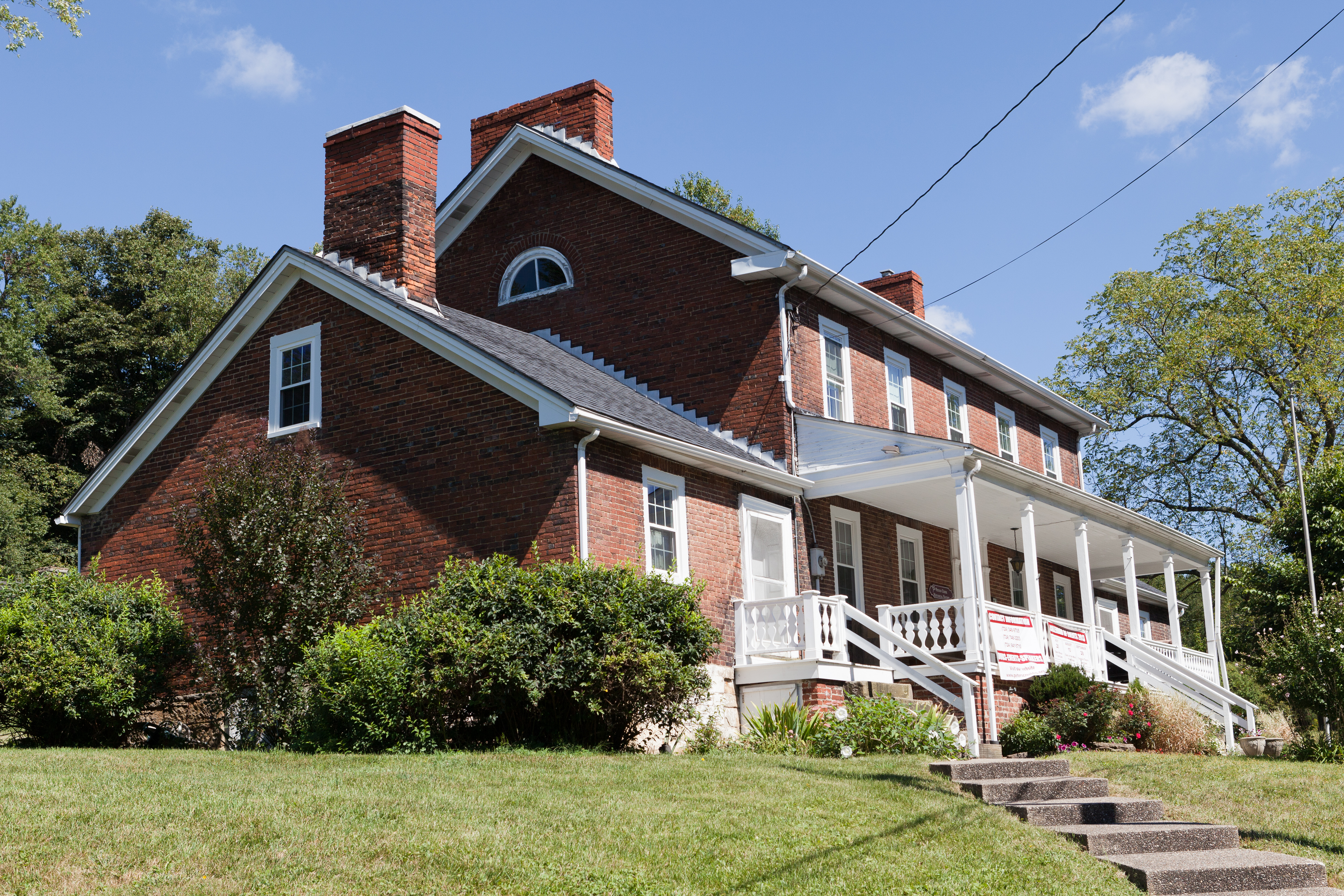

- Location within Pennsylvania Location within the United States
- Location: 815 Venetia Rd., Peters Township, Washington County, Pennsylvania
- Coordinates: 40°14′59″N 80°1′44″W
- Area: less than one acre
- Built: 1815
- Architectural style: Federal
- NRHP reference No.: 07000466
- Added to NRHP: May 24, 2007

Enoch Wright House is a historic building in Peters Township, Washington County, Pennsylvania, United States. The house was built sometime around 1815 by Enoch Wright on land he inherited from his father, Joshua, who moved to the area c. 1772. Wright family members lived in the house until 1862, when they began to rent it out. In 1972, they donated the house to the Peters Creek Historical Society, which now uses it as a museum.

Bricks for the house were manufactured on site. The house was built for two families, with separate kitchens on each end. The house's 12 rooms each have their own fireplaces.
