= Peters Township High School =

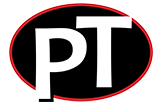

Location
- 121 Rolling Hills Drive; McMurray, Pennsylvania

Information
- Type: Public
- School district: Peters Township School District
- Principal: Lori Pavlik
- Teaching staff: 81.85 (on an FTE basis)
- Enrollment: 1,231 (2023–2024)
- Student to teacher ratio: 15.04
- Colors: Red and white
- Website: www.ptsd.k12.pa.us

Peters Township High School is a public high school located in McMurray, Pennsylvania, with a current enrollment of approximately 1,200 students in grades 9-12. It is part of the Peters Township School District.

== History ==
The original high school building (now Peters Township Middle School) was built in 1968 and renovated in 1981, 2001 for $24 million, and 2021 for $16 million. The new high school building was constructed in 2021 for $83 million. It is located at the site of the former Rolling Hills Country Club, which closed in 2015. The 2012 movie The Perks of Being A Wallflower filmed some scenes at the original high school building.

== Notable alumni ==
- Steve Bell, soccer player and broadcaster
- Jocelyn Benson, 43rd Secretary of State of Michigan
- Matt “Atlanta Bliss” Blistan, jazz trumpeter
- Matt Clackson, ice hockey player
- Stephanie D'Abruzzo, actress and puppeteer
- Christian Hanson, ice hockey player
- John-Henry Krueger, speed skater
- Michael Maniaci, opera singer
- Shea Marshall, musician
- Donovan McMillon, football player
- Natalie Palamides, actress and comedian
- Chris Peters, baseball player
- Alison Riske-Amritraj, tennis player
- Brian Simmons, baseball player

== Sports ==
Peters Township High School athletic teams compete in the Western Pennsylvania Interscholastic Athletic League (WPIAL) and the high school offers sixteen varsity-level sports: Baseball, Basketball, Cheerleading, Cross Country, Field Hockey, Football, Golf, Ice Hockey, Lacrosse, Soccer, Softball, Swimming & Diving, Tennis, Track & Field, Volleyball, and Wrestling.

=== Football Championships & Notable Seasons ===
- 2019: 12-2 record; first WPIAL Class 5A Championship appearance (lost to Gateway)
- 2020: 8-1 record; second WPIAL Class 5A Championship appearance (lost to Pine-Richland)
- 2023: 15-1 record; third WPIAL Class 5A Championship appearance (defeated Pine-Richland); first Pennsylvania Interscholastic Athletic Association (PIAA) Class 5A State Playoffs appearance (lost to Imhotep Charter in the finals)
- 2024: 11-2 record; fourth WPIAL Class 5A Championship appearance (lost to Pine-Richland)
- 2025: 13-1 record; fifth WPIAL Class 5A Championship appearance (defeated Pine-Richland); second PIAA Class 5A State Playoffs appearance (lost to Bishop McDevitt in the semifinals)
