= Douro Film Harvest =

Douro Film Harvest is the first totally decentralized international summit of cinema, that takes place in Alto Douro Wine Region, an area classified by UNESCO as World Heritage Patrimony and homeland of Porto Wine.

Douro Valley receives in September this event allying the winery harvest to the film appreciation

The awards assigned are

- CastaDouro Career, to a person which career had been important to the history of 7th Art
- CastaDouro Special Guest
- CastaDouro Best Film, to the only section in competition, the Vintage Selection.

This event is organized by Turismo do Douro, with the support of Port and Douro Wine Institute (IVDP), Douro Mission Structure, Turismo de Portugal and production of Expanding World.

== Douro Film Harvest 2009 ==
On its first edition, Douro Film Harvest brought to Portugal the following guests:

- Miloš Forman
- Andie MacDowell
- Kyle Eastwood

In competition, at Vintage Selection, were the following films:

- 33 scenes from life by Malgoska Szumowska
- About Elly by Asghar Farhadi
- Alice in Land by Esteban Larrain
- Dawn of the world by Abbas Fahdel
- Don't think about white monkeys by Yuri Mamin
- March by Händl Klaus
- Parque via by Enrique Rivero
- Wolfy by Vasili Sigarev (winner)

== Douro Film Harvest 2010 ==
In 2010, Douro Film Harvest had as guests

- Sophia Loren
- Gustavo Santaolalla
- Carlos Saura

In competition in the Vintage Selection were

- 5 x favela, now by ourselves, several directors
- Of Love and other Demons by Hilda Hidalgo
- I, Don Giovanni by Carlos Saura (winner)
- How ended this summer by Alexei Popogrebsky
- Nanga Parbat by Joseph Vilsmaier
- The last flight of flamingo by João Ribeiro
- Solitary Man by David Lean and Brian Koppelman
- South of the Border by Oliver Stone
- The Ghost Writer by Roman Polanski

== Douro Film Harvest 2011 ==
The third edition of Douro Film Harvest will take place between the 5 and 11 September 2011.
