= One red paperclip =

Website tracking a series of trades

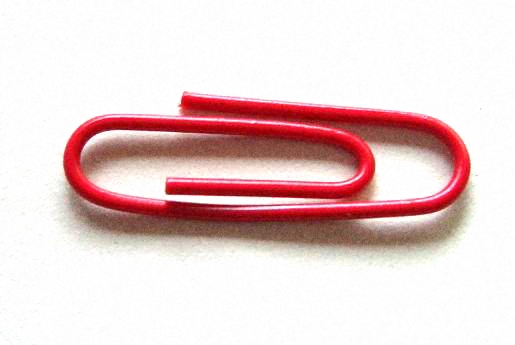
The paperclip that Kyle MacDonald used to start the series of trades by which eventually he traded for a house.

One red paperclip is a website created by Canadian blogger Kyle MacDonald, who traded his way from a single red paperclip to a house in a series of 14 online trades over the course of a year. MacDonald was inspired by the children's game Bigger, Better. His site received a considerable amount of notice for tracking the transactions. "A lot of people have been asking how I've stirred up so much publicity around the project, and my simple answer is: 'I have no idea'", he told the BBC. The story has inspired countless copycats, who have attempted to trade their way up from a paperclip or other small items to something expensive, with varying degrees of success.

== History ==
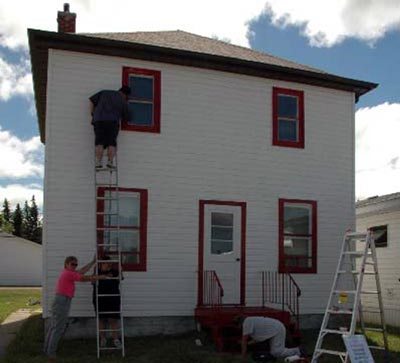
Kyle MacDonald's house

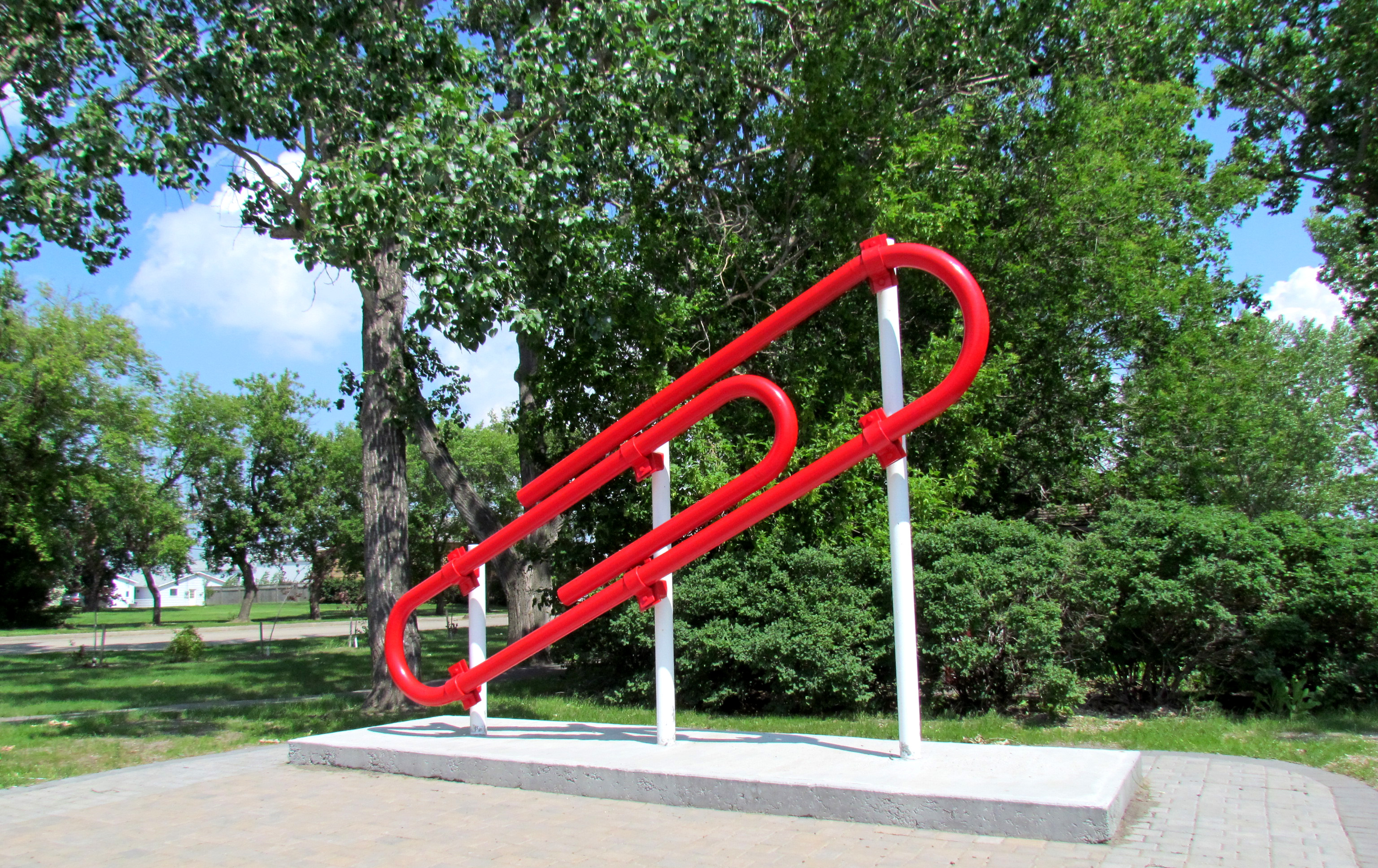
This red paper clip sculpture was installed in 2007 at Bell Park in Kipling as a monument to the series of trades made by MacDonald. At the time, it was the world's largest paper clip.

MacDonald made his first trade, a red paper clip for a fish-shaped pen, on July 14, 2005. He reached his goal of trading up to a house with the fourteenth transaction, trading a movie role for a house. This is the list of all transactions MacDonald made:

1. On July 14, 2005, he went to Vancouver and traded the paperclip for a fish-shaped pen.
2. He then traded the pen the same day for a hand-sculpted doorknob from Seattle, Washington.
3. On July 25, 2005, he travelled to Amherst, Massachusetts, with a friend to trade the doorknob for a Coleman camp stove with fuel.
4. On September 24, 2005, he went to California, and traded the camp stove for a Honda generator.
5. On November 16, 2005, he travelled to Maspeth, Queens, and traded the generator for an "instant party": an empty keg, an IOU for filling the keg with the beer of the bearer's choice, and a neon Budweiser sign. This was his second attempt to make the trade: his first had resulted in the generator being temporarily confiscated by the New York City Fire Department.
6. On December 8, 2005, he traded the "instant party" to Quebec comedian and radio personality Michel Barrette for a Ski-Doo snowmobile.
7. Within a week of that, he traded the snowmobile for a two-person trip to Yahk, British Columbia, scheduled for February 2006.
8. On or about January 7, 2006, he traded the second spot on the Yahk trip for a box truck.
9. On or about February 22, 2006, he traded the box truck for a recording contract with Metalworks in Mississauga, Ontario.
10. On or about April 11, 2006, he traded the contract to Jody Gnant for a year's rent in Phoenix, Arizona.
11. On or about April 26, 2006, he traded the year's rent in Phoenix for one afternoon with Alice Cooper.
12. On or about May 26, 2006, he traded the afternoon with Cooper for a Kiss motorized snow globe.
13. On or about June 2, 2006, he traded the snow globe to Corbin Bernsen for a role in the film Donna on Demand.
14. On July 12, 2006, he traded the movie role for a two-story house located at 503 Main Street in Kipling, Saskatchewan.

The house was a pre-fabricated model purchased from an Eaton's catalogue in the 1920s. It was purchased by the town in 2006, and was offered in the exchange as a means to promote economic development. After remaining vacant for a few years, the house was sold to Billie and Ellen Johnson in 2010, who turned the house into a café known as the Red Paperclip Cottage, which operated until July 2026.

In 2015, MacDonald spoke about his experience in a TEDx talk in Vienna, Austria.

== See also ==
- Gudbrand on the Hill-side
- Hans in Luck
- Straw Millionaire
- Trade Me Project
- Wheat and chessboard problem
