= Corbin Bernsen =

American actor and director (born 1954)

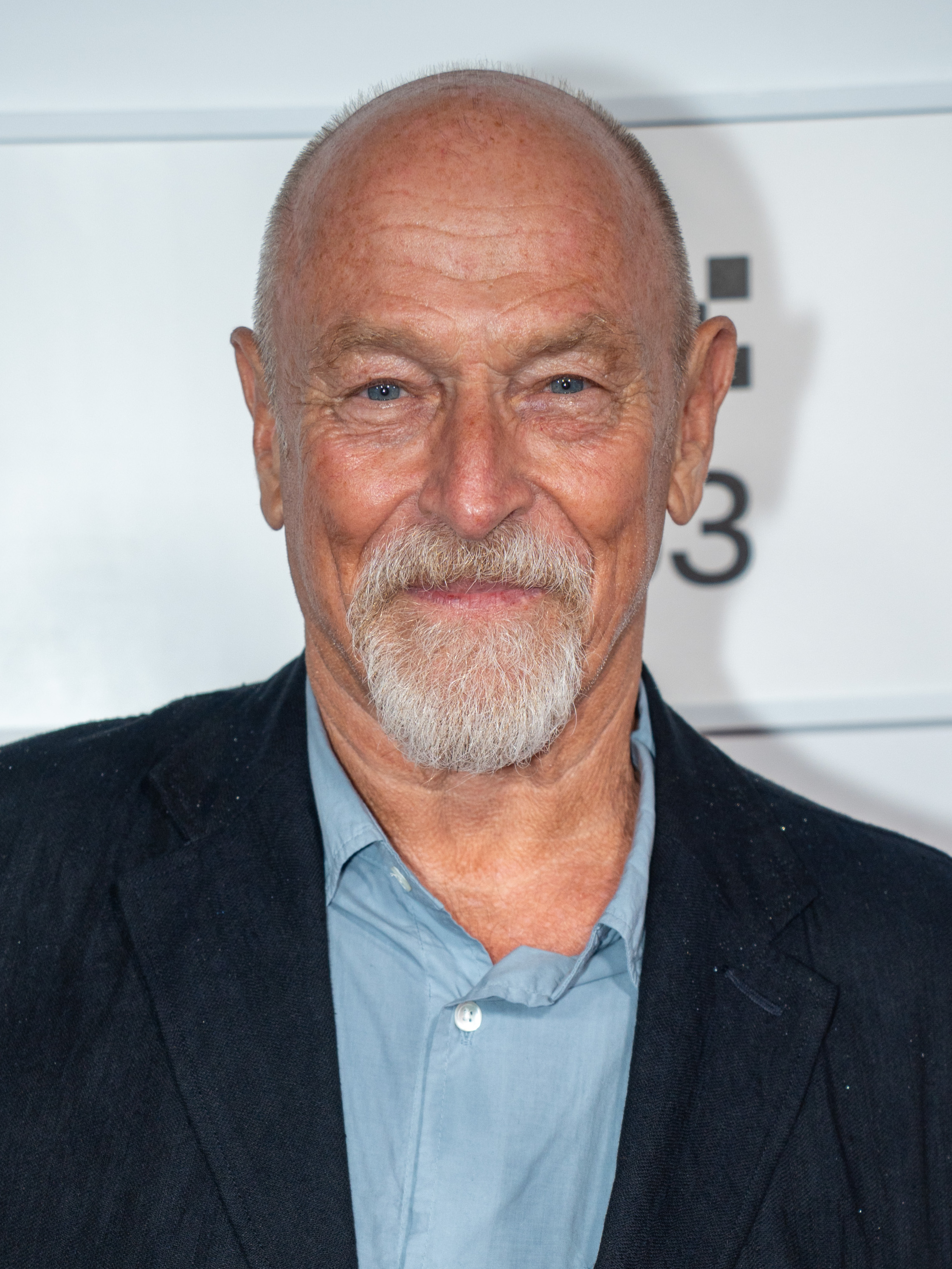
- Bernsen at the 2025 Tribeca Festival
- Born: Corbin Dean Bernsen; September 7, 1954 (age 71); Los Angeles, California, U.S.
- Education: University of California, Los Angeles (BFA, MFA)
- Occupations: Actor; film director
- Years active: 1967–present
- Known for: L.A. Law; L.A. Law: The Movie; Major League; Psych; Psych: The Movie
- Spouses: Brenda Cooper (m. 1983–1987) Amanda Pays (m. 1988)
- Children: 4
- Parents: Harry Bernsen Jr.; Jeanne Cooper

Corbin Dean Bernsen (born September 7, 1954) is an American actor and film director. He appeared as divorce attorney Arnold Becker on the NBC drama series L.A. Law, as Dr. Alan Feinstone in The Dentist, as retired police detective Henry Spencer on the USA Network comedy-drama series Psych, and as Roger Dorn in the films Major League, Major League II, and Major League: Back to the Minors. He also appeared regularly on The Resident, The Curse, General Hospital, and Cuts, and has had intermittent appearances on The Young and the Restless.

== Early life ==
Bernsen was born in North Hollywood, the eldest son of producer Harry Bernsen Jr. and soap actress Jeanne Cooper. He graduated from Beverly Hills High School in 1972. Bernsen is also a "double Bruin", having received both a BA in Theatre Arts in 1977 and an MFA in Playwriting in 1979 from UCLA.

== Career ==
=== Acting ===
After a two-year appearance on the soap opera Ryan's Hope, Bernsen was cast as lawyer Arnold Becker on the Steven Bochco television series L.A. Law in 1986. The series became a hit, and the role earned him Emmy and Golden Globe nominations, appearances on magazine covers, and guest-starring roles on Seinfeld and The Larry Sanders Show. He remained on L.A. Law for the entire run of the show, until it ended in 1994. He played the lead role in the two-season, NASA-themed series The Cape in 1996–97.

Bernsen appeared with British actor Bruce Payne in the films Kounterfeit and Aurora: Operation Intercept. He starred as the title character, Dr. Alan Feinstone, in the horror film The Dentist and its sequel. Bernsen was also cast as prima donna third baseman Roger Dorn in the sports comedy Major League and appeared in both of the film's sequels. Bernsen portrayed John Durant on General Hospital from September 2004 until the character was murdered in May 2006.

Bernsen played Jack Sherwood on Cuts, appeared twice on Celebrity Mole, and played a lawyer on Boston Legal. He appeared as another Q on Star Trek: The Next Generation. He also had a recurring role as Captain Owen Sebring on the military drama JAG and played a Republican senator in two episodes of The West Wing. He directed, produced, and appeared in the horror film Dead Air. Bernsen also co-starred in USA's Psych, playing the role of Henry Spencer, the father of the main character, Shawn Spencer (James Roday). In the film Rust, Bernsen plays a former minister who returns to his hometown.

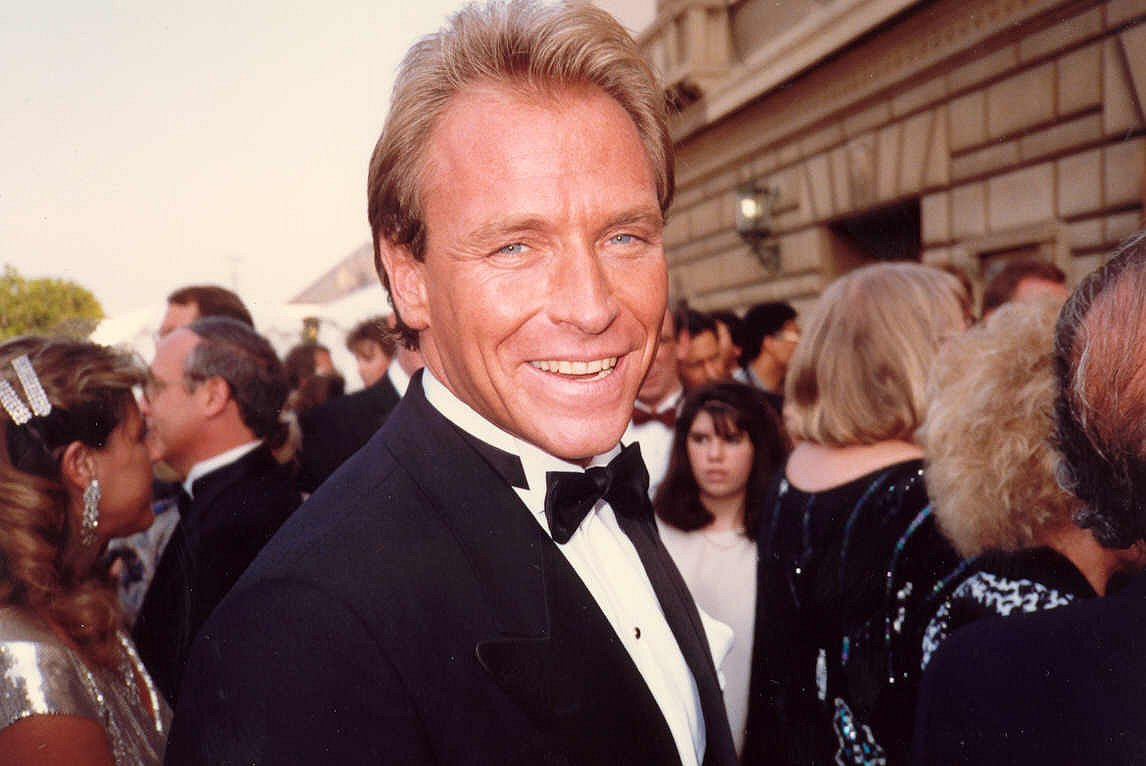
Bernsen at the 39th Emmy Awards in 1987

Bernsen appeared in 25 Hill, a film he produced, directed and wrote, which is centered on the All-American Soap Box Derby, and at one time was planning a baseball movie about zombies, called Three Strikes, You're Dead.

He also appeared as a guest star in one episode of Switched at Birth, the ABC Family television series. Bernsen currently appears as Kyle Nevin on the television series The Resident.

=== Producing ===
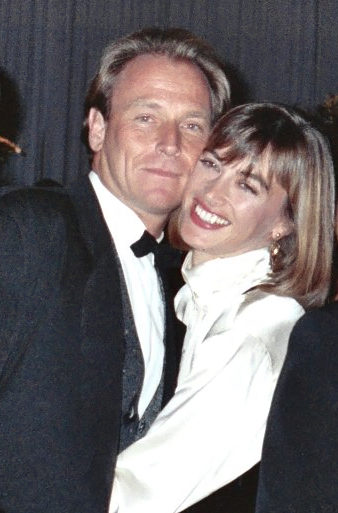
Bernsen and wife Amanda Pays at the Emmy Awards Governor's Ball, August 1990

Bernsen was president and co-owner of Public Media Works, a new media company that develops entertainment for targeted fan bases. He directed and starred in Carpool Guy, the company's first film; it was targeted at soap opera fans and released on DVD in 2005.

Bernsen then went on to form Team Cherokee Productions. According to the book One Red Paperclip, in June 2006, Bernsen traded a role in the film Donna on Demand to Kyle MacDonald for a snow globe of the band Kiss. It was this role that MacDonald eventually traded for a two-story farmhouse.

In recent years, Bernsen focused on stories that explore aspects of Christian faith in today's world and how that can contribute to, but also tends to divide our common humanity. His first such film was Rust, released in 2010 by Sony Pictures. Bernsen, along with producing partner Chris Aronoff, formed Home Theater Films, an independent production company that develops, produces, and markets films and television shows. 25 Hill, the company's first title, was released in July 2012. This was followed by 3 Day Test (2012), Beyond the Heavens (2013), and Life with Dog (2017). Their film Mary 4 Mayor was due out in the fall of 2020.

=== Writing ===
In October 2015, the Pelican Book Group released Bernsen's debut novel. The book, Rust: the Novel, is an adaptation of Bernsen's 2010 feature film, Rust, in which he played the main character and served as writer and director. Bernsen and his wife, Amanda Pays, have co-authored two books, Change Houses, Not Spouses and Open House: Reinventing Space for Simple Living, a coffee table book featuring remodeling and design ideas they have learned from remodeling their own homes.

== Personal life ==
Bernsen was married to Brenda Cooper from 1983 to 1987. Bernsen has been married to British actress Amanda Pays since 1988. They have four sons: Oliver, Angus, Henry, and Finley. Pays and Bernsen moved to the Hudson Valley in upstate New York in 2019 where he now focuses on film and television projects that can be shot locally.

Bernsen has one of the largest snow globe collections in the world, with over 8,000 globes. One notable globe in his collection is a Kiss motorized snow globe, for which Kyle MacDonald traded him in exchange for a speaking role in the film Donna on Demand. This was part of the famous "One Red Paperclip" series of trades, whereby MacDonald started with a red paperclip and ended with a farmhouse in Kipling, Saskatchewan.

== Filmography ==
=== Film ===
Year	Title	Role	Notes
1967	Clambake	Roy	Uncredited
1974	Three the Hard Way	Boy	
1976	Eat My Dust!	Roy Puire	
1976	King Kong	Reporter	Uncredited
1981	S.O.B.	Surfer on Beach	
1987	Dead Aim	Webster	
1987	Hello Again	Jason Chadman	
1989	Bert Rigby, You're a Fool	Jim Shirley	
1989	Major League	Roger Dorn	
1989	Disorganized Crime	Frank Salazar	
1991	Shattered	Jeb Scott	
1992	Frozen Assets	Zach Shepard	
1993	Fatal Inheritance	Woodward Dawes	
1993	Ghost Brigade	Col. Nehemiah Strayn	
1994	The Soft Kill	Martin Lewis	
1994	Bud Bowl V	Coach of Team Bud Light	
1994	A Brilliant Disguise	Dr. Martin	
1994	Trigger Fast	Brent Mallick	
1994	Final Mission	General Morgan Breslaw	
1994	Major League II	Roger Dorn	
1994	Savage Land	Quint	
1994	The New Age	Kevin Bulasky	
1994	Radioland Murders	Dexter Morris	
1995	Someone to Die For	Jack Davis	
1995	Cover Me	Andre Solloway	
1995	Aurora: Operation Intercept	Flight Engineer Murphy	
1995	Tales from the Hood	Duke Metger	
1995	Temptress	Nick	
1995	Baja	John Stone	
1996	The Dentist	Dr. Alan Feinstone	
1996	The Great White Hype	Peter Prince	
1996	Kounterfeit	Marty Hopkins	
1997	An American Affair	Dist. Atty. Sam Brady / Sen. John Crawford	
1997	Menno's Mind	Felix Medina	
1997	Spacejacked	Barnes	
1998	The Fairy King of Ar	Rob Preston	
1998	Major League: Back to the Minors	Roger Dorn	
1998	The Dentist 2	Dr. Alan Feinstone	
1998	The Misadventures of Margaret	Art Turner	
1998	Kiss of a Stranger	Mason	
2000	Rangers	The Senator	
2000	Delicate Instruments	Sam Livingstone	
2001	Borderline Normal	Benjiman Walling	
2001	Apocalypse IV: Judgment	Mitch Kendrick	
2001	Rubbernecking	Mr. Jones	
2001	Final Payback	Mayor Richardson	
2001	Killer Instinct	Jennings Wilhite	
2001	Raptor	Dr. Hyde	
2002	Fangs	Carl Hart	
2002	The Tomorrow Man	Larry	
2002	Dead Above Ground	Mark Mallory	
2003	The Commission	Rep. Gerald R. Ford	
2003	The Company You Keep	Poindexter	
2004	Nightmare Boulevard	Jerry Martin	
2004	Death and Texas	Coach Loren Stanley	
2005	Raging Sharks	Capt. Riley	
2005	Kiss Kiss Bang Bang	Harlan Dexter	Nominated—Satellite Award for Best Supporting Actor – Motion Picture
2005	Carpool Guy	Michael	Also director and producer
2006	Submission	Max	
2006	The Naked Ape	Mr. Feldman	
2006	Paid	William Montague	
2006	Last Sunset	John Wayne	
2007	Pirate Camp	Hookbeard	
2008	House of Fallen	Rowland	
2009	Donna on Demand	Ben Corbin	Also director
2009	Dead Air	Dr. F	Also director
2009	Trapped	Edward Hutton	
2010	Rust	James Moore	Also director, writer, and producer
2010	Closets	Grant Erickson	
2010	Across the Line: The Exodus of Charlie Wright	FBI Director Hill	
2011	25 Hill	Roy Gibbs	Also director, writer, and producer
2011	Bad Actress	Himself	
2011	Suing the Devil	Barry Polk	
2011	The Big Year	Gil Gordon	
2011	The Ascension	Carl	
2011	Pizza Man	Criswell	
2012	Lay the Favorite	Jerry	
2012	Lizzie	Dr. Fredricks	
2012	3 Day Test	Tom	Also director and writer
2012	Gordon Family Tree	Ron Goodson	
2012	Beyond the Heavens	Gus Henry	
2014	Fast Track	Liam Sterling	
2014	Christian Mingle	Matt	Also director and writer
2014	The Last Straw	Mr. G.	
2015	Midland	The Shepherd	Short film
2015	God's Club	Max Graves	
2016	Prayer Never Fails	Joseph T. Harrington	
2016	Dead Man Rising	Buck	
2016	The Elvis Room	Harker	Short film
2016	In-Lawfully Yours	Father Grayson	Producer
2017	Maximum Security	Price	
2017	Boone: The Bounty Hunter	Cage Bickle	
2017	Distortion	Dr. Eli Sutton	
2017	My Daddy's in Heaven	Rick Adams	
2018	Surviving Theater 9	Tom	Short film
2018	Reach	Charles	
2018	The Russian Bride	Karl Frederick	
2018	Life with Dog	Joe Bigler	
2018	Alone We Fight	Colonel Bradley Armstrong	
2018	Eco-Teens Save the World!	Senator Jeremy Ryburn	
2019	Faith, Hope & Love	Brian Fuller	
2019	Swell	Harold	
2019	When We Last Spoke	Walt	
2019	Cadia: The World Within	George	
2019	All Good Things	Pop-Pop	
2019	Sensory Perception	Mr. Friedrich	
2019	Sunrise in Heaven	Jim	a.k.a. Forever Love
2020	Connective Tissue	Dr. Epstein	Short film
2020	Roe v. Wade	Harry Blackmun	
2020	First Lady	King Max	
2020	Mary for Mayor	Pat	
2020	A Deadly Legend	Matthias Leary	
2020	The Unseen Realm	Himself	
2020	The Farmer and the Belle: Saving Santaland	Gran'Poppy	
2020	The Christmas Project 2	Grandpa George	
2020	A Bennett Song Holiday	Aiden Neville	
2021	Past Shadows	Lewis Samuels	
2021	Weekend Warriors	Chief Baumgardner	
2021	The Hating Game	Bexley	
2022	Game Changer	Iann Gabriel	
2022	Repeater	Edgar Mann	
2023	Left Behind: Rise of the Antichrist	Steve Plank	
2023	Herd	Robert Miller	
2023	Memory Box	Father (voice)	Short film
2023	Christmas at Keestone	Clint Baker	
2024	The Beldham		
2025	Marshmallow	Roy	
2025	Tow	Martin La Rosa	

=== Television ===
Year	Title	Role	Notes
1979	Flying High	Dan Ellison	Episode: "It Was Just One of Those Days"
1980	The Waltons	Casey	Episode: "The Medal"
1984–1985	Ryan's Hope	Ken Graham	5 episodes
1986–1994	L.A. Law	Arnie Becker	171 episodes Nominated—Golden Globe Award for Best Actor – Television Series Drama (1989–90); Nominated—Primetime Emmy Award for Outstanding Lead Actor in a Drama Series (1987–88)
1987	Matlock	Himself	Episode: "The Network"
1988	Mickey's 60th Birthday	Arnie Becker	TV special
1989	Breaking Point	Pike	Television movie
1990	Saturday Night Live	Himself	Episode: "Corbin Bernsen/The Smithereens"
1990	Star Trek: The Next Generation	Other Q (uncredited)	Episode: "Deja Q"
1990	Dear John	Blake McCarron	Episode: "Hole in One"
1991	Out of This World	Chad	Episode: "Evie Nightinggale"
1991	Line of Fire: The Morris Dees Story	Morris Dees	Television movie
1991	Dead on the Money	Carter Matthews	Television movie
1992	Grass Roots	Will Lee	Television movie
1992	Seinfeld	Himself	Episode: "The Trip: Part 1"
1992	Ring of the Musketeers	Harry	Television movie
1992	Love Can Be Murder	Nick Peyton	Television movie
1993	The Larry Sanders Show	Himself	Episode: "The Stalker"
1993	Roc	Jim Larson	Episode: "The Millionaire Brother"
1993	Beyond Suspicion	Stan	Television movie
1994	Guns of Honor	Brent Mallick	Television movie
1994	The Nanny	Glen Mitchell	Episode: "Stock Tip"
1994	The Extraordinary	Himself (host)	
1994	I Know My Son Is Alive	Dr. Mark Elshant	Television movie
1994	Where Are My Children?	Tom Scott	Television movie
1995	Dangerous Intentions	Tim Williamson	Television movie
1995	A Whole New Ballgame	Brett Sooner	7 episodes
1995	In the Heat of the Night	Frank Cole	Episode: "By Duty Bound"
1995	Tails You Live, Heads You're Dead	Neil Jones/Roy Francis Netter	Television movie
1995	Murderous Intent	Brice	Television movie
1996	Bloodhounds	Harrison Coyle	Television movie
1996	Murder on the Iditarod Trail	Alex Jensen	Television movie
1996	Inhumanoid	Foster Carver	Television movie
1996	Bloodhounds II	Harrison Coyle	Television movie
1996	Full Circle	Harrison Winslow	Television movie
1996–1997	The Cape	USAF Col. Henry 'Bull' Eckert	17 episodes
1997	Touched by an Angel	Eric Weiss	Episode: "Angel of Death"
1997	Tidal Wave: No Escape	John Wahl	Television movie
1998	Loyal Opposition: Terror in the White House	Secret Service Agent John Gray	Television movie
1998	Riddler's Moon	George	Television movie
1998	Recipe for Revenge	Dr. Chester Winnifield	Television movie
1998	Young Hearts Unlimited	Brian	Television movie
1999	Tracey Takes On...	Jack Dayton	Episode: "Dating"
1999	7th Heaven	Ted Grant	Episode: "Sometimes That's Just the Way It Is"
1999	Twice in a Lifetime	Roger Stovall/Bill Water	Episode: "Death and Taxes"
1999	Nash Bridges	Edward Jansen	Episode: "Trade Off"
1999	Two of Hearts	Bruce Saunders	Television movie
1999–2004	JAG	Captain Owen Sebring	8 episodes
2000	Battery Park	Michael	Episode: "Rabbit Punch"
2000	The Outer Limits	Virgil Nygard	Episode: "Abaddon"
2000	Son of the Beach	Big Red Johnson	Episode: "Miso Honei"
2000	Beggars and Choosers	Sandy Peretz	Episode: "Killer Sushi"
2000	Yes, Dear	Gary Walden	Episode: "Jimmy Gets a Job"
2000	Baywatch	Barry Poe	Episode: "Ties That Bind"
2001	The West Wing	Henry Shallick	2 episodes
2001	V.I.P.	Zack Henley	Episode: "Val in Carnation"
2001	Jack & Jill	Paul Barrett	2 episodes
2001	Citizen Baines	Nicholas Tassler	Episode: "Three Days in November"
2002	The Weakest Link	Himself	Episode: "L.A. Law Edition"
2002	Gentle Ben	Fog Benson	Television movie
2002	L.A. Law: The Movie	Arnie Becker	Television movie
2002	Atomic Twister	Sheriff C. B. Bishop	Television movie
2002	I Saw Mommy Kissing Santa Claus	David Carver	Television movie
2002	The Santa Trap	Chief Tom Spivak	Television movie
2003	Gentle Ben 2	Fog Benson	Television movie
2003	Love Comes Softly	Ben Graham	Television movie
2003	Miss Match	Stu 'Dr. Love' Scott	Episode: "Divorce Happens"
2003	L.A. Dragnet	Richard Atkins	Episode: "All That Glitters"
2003	Celebrity Mole: Hawaii	Himself	3 episodes
2003	Just Shoot Me!	Himself	Episode: "For the Last Time, I Do"
2004	Third Watch	Carter Savage	Episode: "Rat Bastard"
2004	NYPD Blue	Bob Cavanaugh	Episode: "I Love My Wives, But Oh You Kid"
2004	Celebrity Mole: Yucatan	Himself	2 episodes
2004	Call Me: The Rise and Fall of Heidi Fleiss	Steve	Television movie
2004	They Are Among Us	Norbert	Television movie
2004–2017	The Young and the Restless	Father Todd Williams	22 episodes
2004–2006	General Hospital	John Durant	5 episodes
2005	Palmetto Pointe	Old Ballplayer	Episode: "All That You Can't Leave Behind"
2005	Law & Order: Criminal Intent	William Hendry	Episode: "Prisoner"
2005	Ordinary Miracles	David Woodbury	Television movie
2005–2006	Cuts	Jack Sherwood	12 episodes
2006	Wheel of Fortune	Himself	Episode: "Soap Stars 4"
2006	Boston Legal	Eli Granger	Episode: "...There's Fire!"
2006–2014	Psych	Henry Spencer	111 episodes
2007	Masters of Horror	Ira	Episode: "Right to Die"
2008	How Much Is Enough?	Host	40 episodes
2008	Depth Charge	Captain Richards	Television movie
2008	Vipers	Burton	Television movie
2008	Confessions of a Go-Go Girl	Nick Harvey	Television movie
2008	For the Love of Grace	Captain Washington	Television movie
2009	The New Adventures of Old Christine	Howard	Episode: "For Love or Money"
2010	Tim and Eric Awesome Show, Great Job!	Himself	Episode: "Comedy"
2011	Castle	Lance Hastings	Episode: "One Life to Lose"
2011	Criminal Minds	Jerry Grandin	Episode: "Today I Do"
2012	Switched at Birth	James Wilkes Jr.	Episode: "Venus, Cupid, Folly and Time"
2013	The Glades	Michael Longworth	4 episodes
2013	Hawaii Five-0	Henry Upton	Episode: Kupouli 'la (Broken)
2014	Motive	Dr. Matthews	Episode: "Deception"
2014	Scorpion	Bob Connelly	Episode: "Shorthanded"
2014	The League	Bruce	Episode: "Man Land"
2014	Anger Management	Roger	Episode: "Charlie & The 100th Episode"
2015	Grace and Frankie	Dr. Paul Mason	Episode: "The Fall"
2015	NCIS: New Orleans	Navy Admiral Adam Huntley	Episode: "The Abyss"
2015	It Had to Be You	Nolan Powell	Television movie
2017	Powerless	Vanderveer Wayne Sr.	Episode: "Sinking Day"
2017	American Gods	Vulcan	Episode: "A Murder of Gods"
2017	Psych: The Movie	Henry Spencer	Television movie
2018	Hap and Leonard	Chief Cantuck	4 episodes
2018	Billions	Bill McGann	2 episodes
2018	The Kominsky Method	Himself	Episode: "Chapter 3: A Prostate Enlarges"
2018–2021	Magnum P.I.	Francis "Icepick" Hofstetler	4 episodes
2019–2022	The Resident	Kyle Nevin	15 episodes
2019	The Punisher	Anderson Schultz	4 episodes
2019	Fresh Off the Boat	Mervin	Episode: "Help Unwanted?"
2020	Tommy	Milton Leakey	4 episodes
2020	Psych 2: Lassie Come Home	Henry Spencer	Television movie
2021	Psych 3: This Is Gus	Henry Spencer	Television movie
2022	City on a Hill	Sinclair Dryden	7 episodes
2023	East New York	Duke Jacobs	2 episodes
2023	White House Plumbers	Richard Kleindienst	Episode: "The Writer's Wife"
2023–2024	The Curse	Paul	4 episodes
2024	Clipped	Pierce O'Donnell	3 episodes
2025–present	Your Friends & Neighbors	Jack Bailey	Recurring role; 10 episodes
2025	Duster	Wade Ellis	Recurring role; 6 episodes
2026	The Fall and Rise of Reggie Dinkins	Duck Donovan	2 episodes

Key
†	Denotes television productions that have not yet been released
