= Kristofer Hill =

American singer-songwriter (born 1979)

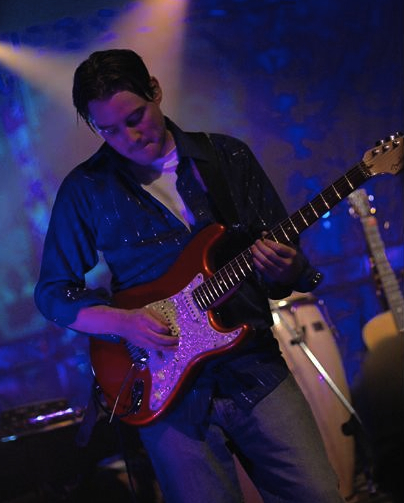
- Performing

Background information
- Born: Kristofer Thomas Hill; October 13, 1979; Maplewood, New Jersey, United States
- Genres: pop, rock, soul, Hip Hop
- Occupations: Singer, songwriter, record producer, composer, educator, multi-instrumentalist
- Instruments: Vocals, piano, guitar, beatbox, drums, cajon, other percussion
- Years active: 1979–present
- Labels: Independent, Universatile Music,
- Website: [kristoferhill.com]

Kristofer Thomas Hill (born in Summit, New Jersey on October 13, 1979) is an American musician, composer, singer-songwriter, guitarist, pianist, and multi percussionist.

He was raised in Maplewood, New Jersey.

He is a guest artist with Free Arts of AZ, a non-profit organization which works with vulnerable youth in Arizona through the arts, music, theater, and dance.

== Discography ==
- Drunken Immortals "Live" – 2001
- Blow Up Co-op – 2002 – Collective works from AZ Hip-Hop musicians and MC's
- Collective Memory – 2002 – Farbeon
- Soul Revolution – 2003 – Drunken Immortals
- Foundation – 2003 – Produced by foundation
- Brad B.: Drifter – 2005 – Produced by foundation
- Hot Concrete – 2006 – Drunken Immortals feat. Abstract Rude and Dres
- Ganesha:Music for Modern – 2006 – Kristofer T. Hill
- Flamenco – 2006 – Chris Burton Jacome ensemble
- Fantasy – 2007 – Sound track for Scorpius Dance Theater Production inspired by Michael Parks paintings
- Pivot – 2007 – Jody Gnant and BoGeSo
- David & Lisa – 2008 – Soundtrack for Scorpius Dance Theater production
- A Vampire Tale- 2009 – Soundtrack for Scorpius Dance Theater production
- Insects: Gone- 2009 – Hip Hop
- Levanto – 2010 – Music from Ballet de Martin Gaxiola's flamenco dance production Levanto
