= McMurray, Pennsylvania =

Census-designated place in Pennsylvania, US

- Census-designated place
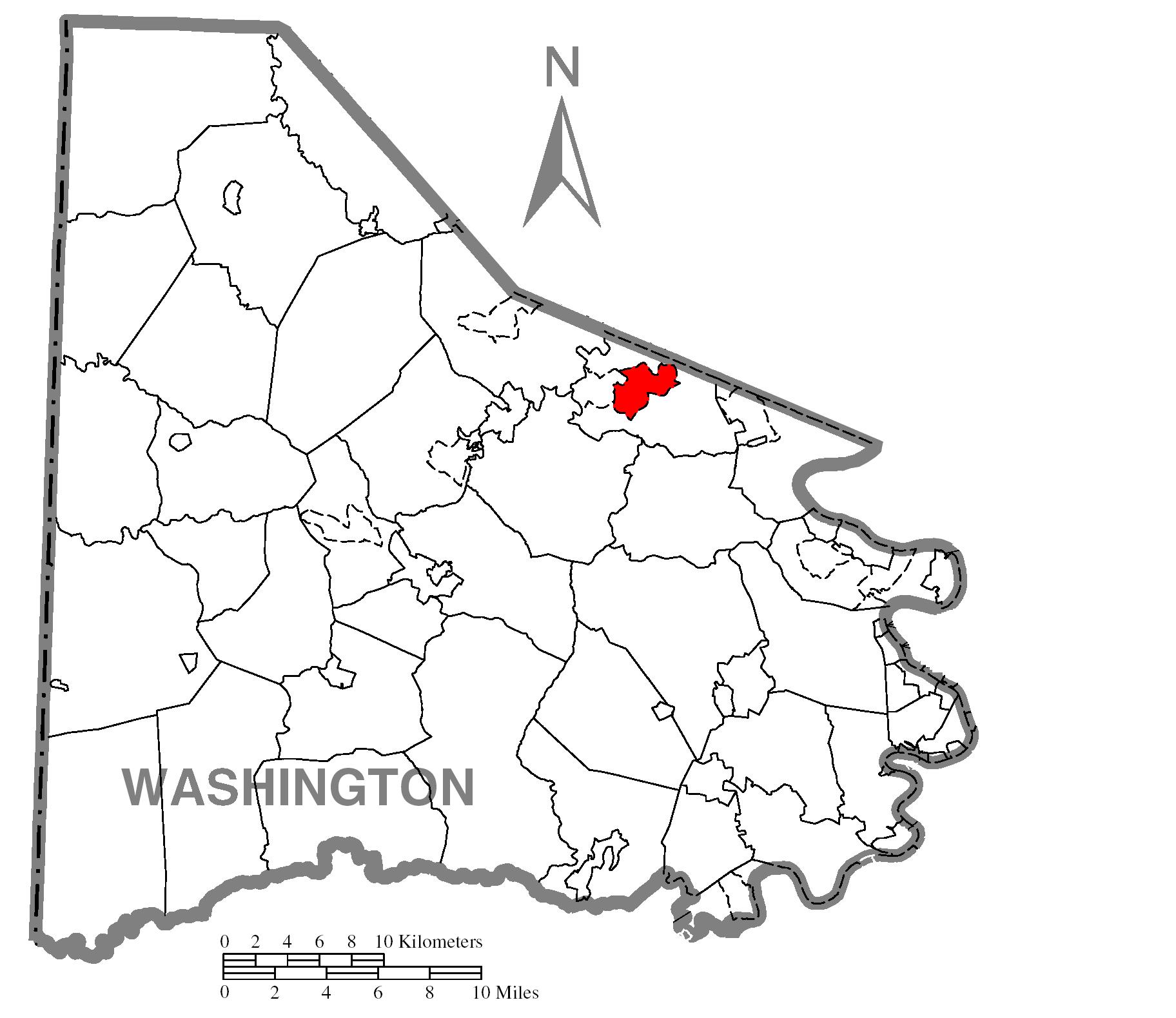
- Location of McMurray in Washington County, Pennsylvania

- Location within Pennsylvania Location within the United States
- Coordinates: 40°16′56″N 80°5′14″W
- Country: United States
- State: Pennsylvania
- County: Washington
- Township: Peters Township
- Named for: Levi McMurray

Area
  - Total: 3.07 sq mi (7.94 km^{2})
  - Land: 3.07 sq mi (7.94 km^{2})
  - Water: 0 sq mi (0.00 km^{2})

Population (2020)
  - Total: 4,736
  - Density: 1,544/sq mi (596.1/km^{2})
- Time zone: UTC-5 (EST)
  - Summer (DST): UTC-4 (EDT)
- ZIP Code: 15317
- Area code: 724
- FIPS code: 42-46344

McMurray is a census-designated place (CDP) in Peters Township, Washington County, Pennsylvania, United States. The population was 4,736 at the 2020 census. It is part of the Pittsburgh metropolitan area. Its ZIP Code is 15317, which it shares with neighboring borough Canonsburg.

McMurray is a civic and commercial hub for Peters Township: the Peters Township municipal building (610 East McMurray Road) and the Peters Township Public Library (616 East McMurray Road) are both located in McMurray.

== History ==
Peters Township (which includes present-day McMurray) was incorporated in 1781 as one of Washington County's original townships.

McMurray was named after several farmers, including Levi McMurray, who owned and farmed land in the area.

A long-standing local landmark is Donaldson's Crossroads, an intersection named for the Donaldson family. In the early 20th century it was described as a crossing of country roads, where McMurray Road ran east–west and the Pittsburgh–Washington “Cinder Road” approached from the south. A Donaldson family farmhouse built in 1900 at the crossroads was razed in early 2011 during redevelopment of the property.

Local Scouting history is also tied to the McMurray name. The McMurray Boy Scout Troop #1 cabin was dedicated on February 11, 1935, and contemporary local-history materials record that wood from the Levi McMurray (formerly Hall) farm house was used in the cabin's construction.

== Geography ==
McMurray is located at 40°16′56″N 80°5′14″W (40.282276, -80.087162).

According to the United States Census Bureau, the CDP has a total area of 3.1 square miles (8.0 km^{2}), all of it land.

== Transportation ==
McMurray is centered around the junction of U.S. Route 19 (Washington Road) and East/West McMurray Road, commonly referenced locally as Donaldson's Crossroads.

PennDOT has undertaken intersection improvement work nearby, including widening and turn-lane/signal improvements at the intersection of Bebout Road and East McMurray Road in Peters Township.

== Education ==
McMurray is served by the Peters Township School District, which has its administrative offices in McMurray. Schools in the community include McMurray Elementary School.

== Parks and recreation ==
Peters Township's primary community park complex, Peterswood Park, is a 133+ acre facility with athletic fields, playgrounds, an outdoor amphitheater, and a community recreation center campus.

== Demographics ==
Historical population
Census	Pop.	Note	%±
2000	4,726		—
2010	4,647		−1.7%
2020	4,736		1.9%
U.S. Decennial Census

=== 2020 census ===
As of the 2020 census, McMurray had a population of 4,736. The median age was 44.7 years. 22.3% of residents were under the age of 18 and 20.0% of residents were 65 years of age or older. For every 100 females there were 101.9 males, and for every 100 females age 18 and over there were 99.1 males age 18 and over.

100.0% of residents lived in urban areas, while 0.0% lived in rural areas.

There were 1,659 households in McMurray, of which 30.1% had children under the age of 18 living in them. Of all households, 75.7% were married-couple households, 7.0% were households with a male householder and no spouse or partner present, and 13.6% were households with a female householder and no spouse or partner present. About 12.5% of all households were made up of individuals and 6.7% had someone living alone who was 65 years of age or older.

There were 1,730 housing units, of which 4.1% were vacant. The homeowner vacancy rate was 1.1% and the rental vacancy rate was 11.4%.

Racial composition as of the 2020 census
Race	Number	Percent
White	4,387	92.6%
Black or African American	23	0.5%
American Indian and Alaska Native	7	0.1%
Asian	88	1.9%
Native Hawaiian and Other Pacific Islander	0	0.0%
Some other race	14	0.3%
Two or more races	217	4.6%
Hispanic or Latino (of any race)	119	2.5%

=== 2000 census ===
As of the 2000 census, there were 4,726 people, 1,582 households, and 1,387 families living in the CDP. The population density was 1,533.5 people per square mile (592.1 people/km^{2}). There were 1,612 housing units at an average density of 523.1 per square mile (202.0/km^{2}). The racial makeup of the CDP was 97.97% White, 0.55% African American, 0.02% Native American, 0.97% Asian, 0.15% from other races, and 0.34% from two or more races. Hispanic or Latino of any race were 0.72% of the population.

Ancestries of CDP residents include Italian (28.7%), German (28.4%), Irish (24.3%), English (12.0%), Polish (9.4%), and Slovak (4.4%).

There were 1,582 households, out of which 43.7% had children under the age of 18 living with them, 82.1% were married couples living together, 4.7% had a female householder with no husband present, and 12.3% were non-families. 11.2% of all households were made up of individuals, and 6.0% had someone living alone who was 65 years of age or older. The average household size was 2.96 and the average family size was 3.21.

In the CDP the population was spread out, with 31.0% under the age of 18, 3.7% from 18 to 24, 24.9% from 25 to 44, 29.2% from 45 to 64, and 11.3% who were 65 years of age or older. The median age was 40 years. For every 100 females age 18 and over, there were 92.4 males.

The median income for a household in the CDP was $81,736, and the median income for a family was $86,711. Males had a median income of $67,317 versus $41,467 for females. The per capita income for the CDP was $37,364. 0.7% of the population and 0.6% of families were below the poverty line. The median house value in the year 2000 was $187,100.
