= Black Phone (film series) =

Horror film series article

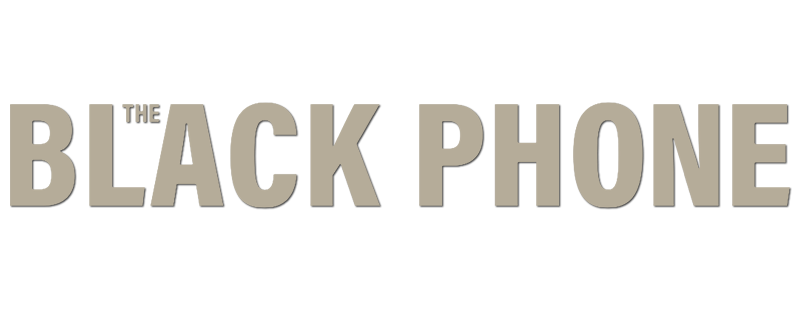
- Official franchise logo, as released originally in 2022.
- Based on: The Black Phone by Joe Hill
- Starring: Mason Thames; Madeleine McGraw; Ethan Hawke; Various actors (See below)
- Production companies: Blumhouse Productions; Crooked Highway
- Distributed by: Universal Pictures
- Release dates: June 24, 2022 (The Black Phone); October 17, 2025 (Black Phone 2)
- Country: United States
- Language: English
- Budget: $46 million (2 films)
- Box office: $293.5 million (2 films)

Black Phone is an American supernatural horror film series created by Scott Derrickson and C. Robert Cargill that has been produced by Blumhouse Productions and Crooked Highway since 2021. The series consists of two theatrical films and a short film. The series is based on the short story authored by Joe Hill and released in his 2007 anthology collection titled 20th Century Ghosts. The plot centers around Finney and Gwen Blake, two siblings who find themselves at odds with a mysterious and sadistic serial killer known only to the public as The Grabber. Through a variety of inexplicable supernatural means, his captives must combat his plans with the help of the spirits of his previous victims, while avoiding his intentions for additional murders.

The first movie was met with critical praise, and was a box office hit becoming a monetary success for the studio. The second film was met with comparable critical and commercial success.

== Origin ==
Despite being the son of an acclaimed author, Joe Hill had various failed attempts at acquiring a publisher for his novels. This changed in 2005, when Hill's first full-length published work was released as an anthology novel of short stories, as 20th Century Ghosts through PS Publishing. The author attributes this first success as the launch of his career, after earning several awards and positive critical reception. Among the other stories, the segment titled The Black Phone follows a boy who is abducted by a serial killer and held captive in a basement. While trapped, he discovers a black phone through which the now deceased previous victims of the Grabber communicate with him. The novella took inspiration from real-life historical events, with the Grabber modeled after John Wayne Gacy; described as an overweight man who works part-time as a clown.

=== Development ===
Following the successes of the Andy Muschietti directed It films, Joe Hill, Scott Derrickson, and C. Robert Cargill collaborated on adjusting the Grabber's profession from clown to magician, and a design that incorporates imagery that makes reference to Lucifer. The collaborative team made additional changes to the character through the casting of Ethan Hawke in the lead villainous role. Derrickson incorporated aspects of other serial killers including Ted Bundy into the character, as well as aspects of the traumatic experiences he had in his childhood into the story to expand the script. Derrickson, Cargill, and Hill additionally looked towards while 1920s and 1930s magic shows that incorporated the devil, when designing the Grabber as a magician. Derrickson worked alongside Tom Savini to design a mask that the production team believed was iconic enough for marketing the film, after Savini's company previously produced horror-themed face masks during the COVID-19 pandemic. Under Derrickson's direction, The Man Who Laughs was used as a reference for inspiration.

== Films ==
Film	U.S. release date	Director	Screenwriters	Producers
The Black Phone	June 24, 2022	Scott Derrickson	Scott Derrickson & C. Robert Cargill	Jason Blum, Scott Derrickson and C. Robert Cargill
Black Phone 2	October 17, 2025	Scott Derrickson	Scott Derrickson & C. Robert Cargill	Jason Blum, Scott Derrickson and C. Robert Cargill

=== The Black Phone (2022) ===
A young teenage boy named Finney Blake finds himself abducted by a sadistic serial killer known as "The Grabber". Locked in a soundproof basement, Finney discovers a black-colored rotary dial which, through supernatural means, allows him to speak with the ghosts of the killer's previous victims.

The spirits provide information to Finney with the hopes of helping him escape before he must face The Grabber in a fight for his life. As a search and rescue continues - to no avail - his teenage sister, Gwen Blake, who possesses psychic abilities, shares her visions with local law enforcement who are in a combined effort race against the clock before the killer escapes and another murder occurs.

=== Black Phone 2 (2025) ===
In June 2022, Derrickson acknowledged that while Hill is protective of the story, the author pitched a "wonderful idea for a sequel", which was dependent on the success of the first movie. By August of the same year, due to the financial and critical successes of the original, the studio had entered discussions with Hill and Derrickson for a sequel. Later, Hill confirmed these discussions while discussing the successes of marketing with the design of the Grabber's mask. A sequel was official green-lit in November 2023, with a script co-written by Derrickson and Cargill. Ethan Hawke, Mason Thames, Madeleine McGraw, and Jeremy Davies were announced to be reprising their respective roles, while Miguel Mora returned as a new character. By December of the same year, Derrickson also signed onto the project to return to his role as director.

Principal photography commenced in November 2024; where the movie will be a joint-production between Universal Pictures, Blumhouse Productions, and Crooked Highway Productions. Marketing officially commenced in April 2025 at CinemaCon, where the first trailer debuted for those in attendance.

Black Phone 2 was released on October 17, 2025.

=== Future ===
In October 2025, Derrickson stated that he would only develop a third film if the story can be better than the previous two installments, expressing that he wants the series to be quality over quantity. Hawke expressed interest in reprising his villainous role in a sequel, stating that he'd like to explore the background story of the Grabber, his journey into Hell, and his continued hauntings of other characters. Hill stated that he foresees the potential for various sequels, but acknowledged that their reality depends on the financial success of Black Phone 2. Cargill acknowledged the potential for another film, but echoed Derrickson's thoughts by stating that they would only start production if the creatives can develop a story that is worthy of realizing.

== Short film ==
Film	U.S. release date	Segment	Director	Screenwriters	Concept by	Producers
V/H/S/85	October 6, 2023	Dreamkill	Scott Derrickson	Scott Derrickson & C. Robert Cargill	Brad Miska & David Bruckner	Brad Miska, Josh Goldbloom, David Bruckner, Chad Villella, Matt Bettinelli-Olpin, Tyler Gillett, and James Harris

Released as one of the VHS home video segments, Dreamkill depicts events that take place in 1985, seven years after The Black Phone, while also sharing continuity. The plot centers around an ongoing criminal investigation centered around a number of tapes they've been receiving, which show the events that caused the deaths of number of ongoing murder investigations. During their research, the detectives are disturbed to discover that one their own sons named Gunther is the source. Upon questioning, the teenage boy claims that these videos are created by inexplicably pulling images from his own nightmares, while explaining that he is convinced that the events within the tapes are the actions of an unknown serial killer. Det. Bobby Shaw believes his son, due to similar experiences within his family which had occurred before, when both Gunther's aunt and his cousin named Gwen had similar supernatural abilities experiencing the recurring horrific visions of the actions of killers. While mourning the pair's similar suicides, Det. Shaw becomes a person of interest as each of the victims have a questionable connection to his past.

== Main cast and characters ==
List indicator

This section includes characters who will appear or have appeared in the franchise in main roles.

- An empty grey cell indicates the character was not in the film, or that the character's official presence has not yet been confirmed.

Character	Films		Short
Character	The Black Phone	Black Phone 2	V/H/S/85
Character	The Black Phone	Black Phone 2	"Dreamkill"
Finney Blake	Mason Thames	Mason Thames	
Gwen Blake	Madeleine McGraw	Madeleine McGraw	
Terrance Blake	Jeremy Davies	Jeremy Davies	
The Grabber	Ethan Hawke	Ethan Hawke	
Max	James Ransone		
Robin	Miguel Cazarez Mora	Miguel Cazarez Mora	
Ernesto		Miguel Mora	
Gunther Shaw			Dashiell Derrickson
Det. Bobby Shaw			James Ransone

== Additional production and crew details ==
Film	Crew/Detail					
Film	Composer	Cinematographer	Editor	Production companies	Distribution companies	Running time
The Black Phone	Mark Korven	Brett Jutkiewicz	Frédéric Thoraval	Blumhouse Productions, Crooked Highway	Universal Pictures	1 hr 43 min
Black Phone 2	Atticus Derickson	Pär M. Ekberg	Louise Ford	Blumhouse Productions, Crooked Highway	Universal Pictures	1 hr 52 min
V/H/S/85 Dreamkill	Atticus Derickson	Brett Jutkiewicz	Andy Holton	Bloody Disgusting, Radio Silence Productions, Cinepocalypse Productions, Studio71, Shudder Original Films	Shudder	24 min

== Reception ==
=== Box office and financial performance ===
Film	Box office gross			Box office ranking		Total home video sales	Worldwide gross total income	Budget	Worldwide net total income	Ref.
Film	North America	Other territories	Worldwide	All-time North America	All-time worldwide	Total home video sales	Worldwide gross total income	Budget	Worldwide net total income	Ref.
The Black Phone	$90,123,230	$71,318,684	$161,441,914	#942	#1,201	$2,021,136	$163,463,050	$16,000,000	$147,463,050	
Black Phone 2	$77,374,625	$54,660,983	$132,035,608	#1,260	#1,596	TBD	>$124,070,880	$30,000,000	>$94,070,880	
V/H/S/85: "Dreamkill"	—N/a	—N/a	—N/a	—N/a	—N/a	Information not publicly available	Information not publicly available	Information not publicly available	Information not publicly available	

=== Critical and public response ===
Film	Rotten Tomatoes	Metacritic	CinemaScore
The Black Phone	81% (270 reviews)	65/100 (38 reviews)	B+
Black Phone 2	72% (180 reviews)	61/100 (37 reviews)	B
V/H/S/85: "Dreamkill"	73% (52 reviews)	—N/a	—N/a
