= The Black Phone =

2021 film by Scott Derrickson

- Theatrical release poster
- Directed by: Scott Derrickson
- Screenplay by: Scott Derrickson; C. Robert Cargill
- Based on: "The Black Phone" by Joe Hill
- Produced by: Jason Blum; Scott Derrickson; C. Robert Cargill
- Starring: Mason Thames; Madeleine McGraw; Jeremy Davies; James Ransone; Ethan Hawke
- Cinematography: Brett Jutkiewicz
- Edited by: Frédéric Thoraval
- Music by: Mark Korven
- Production companies: Blumhouse Productions; Crooked Highway
- Distributed by: Universal Pictures
- Release dates: September 25, 2021 (Fantastic Fest); June 24, 2022 (United States)
- Running time: 103 minutes
- Country: United States
- Language: English
- Budget: $16–18 million
- Box office: $161.4 million

The Black Phone is a 2021 American supernatural horror film directed by Scott Derrickson from a screenplay he wrote with C. Robert Cargill, based on the 2004 short story by Joe Hill. It is the first installment in the Black Phone franchise. It stars Mason Thames as Finney, a teenage boy abducted by a serial child killer known colloquially as the Grabber (Ethan Hawke). When Finney encounters a mystical black rotary phone in captivity, he uses it to plot his escape by communicating with the ghosts of the Grabber's slain victims. Madeleine McGraw, Jeremy Davies, and James Ransone also feature in the principal cast. Derrickson and Cargill produced The Black Phone in association with Blumhouse Productions CEO Jason Blum. Universal Pictures oversaw the film's commercial distribution, and funding was sourced through a pact with Blumhouse and tax subsidies from the North Carolina state government.

The idea of The Black Phone arose from Derrickson and Cargill's adaptation of the eponymous short story by Hill, found in 20th Century Ghosts. Derrickson struggled to produce additional ideas that supplemented the short story, shifting his attention to other filmmaking endeavors. The film remained dormant until he resigned from Doctor Strange in the Multiverse of Madness (2022) over creative differences. Derrickson used his childhood experiences in suburban Denver, Colorado, to develop the story of The Black Phone. Principal photography began in February 2021 on a $16–18 million budget, and wrapped the following month. Shooting took place on sets and on location in Wilmington, North Carolina. Mark Korven composed the film's score, which drew on modern and vintage synthesizer sounds.

The Black Phone premiered at Fantastic Fest on September 25, 2021, and opened in US theaters after several delays on June 24, 2022. It was a box office success, grossing $161.4 million globally. The film received positive reviews from critics, who praised its performances but were divided on its concept. The success of The Black Phone spawned the titular franchise, which includes a canonical short film titled "Dreamkill" as part of the anthology film V/H/S/85 (2023), and a sequel titled Black Phone 2 (2025).

== Plot ==
In 1978, a local serial child abductor and murderer, known only as "The Grabber", prowls the streets of a suburb in North Denver, Colorado. Finney Blake and his younger sister, Gwen, live in the area with their abusive, alcoholic father, Terrence, whose wife died by suicide after having a series of disturbing psychic dreams. Finney is frequently bullied and harassed at school, but his friend and classmate, Robin, fends off the bullies.

Having inherited her mother's ability, Gwen dreams about the Grabber's abduction of Bruce, a boy Finney knew from Little League. Police detectives Wright and Miller interview Gwen at school, believing she may know the Grabber. When Terrence learns about the questioning, he beats Gwen. Soon afterward, the Grabber abducts Robin and then Finney.

Finney awakens in a soundproofed basement with a disconnected black rotary dial telephone on one wall. It begins to ring on its own at times; Finney hears only static when he first answers it but then hears Bruce's voice telling him about a floor tile he can remove to dig an escape tunnel. Finney starts to dig, but the house's foundations are too deep for him to go beneath them.

The Grabber brings Finney a meal and leaves the basement door unlocked. As Finney is about to sneak out, he gets a call from Billy, another past victim. Billy warns Finney that the Grabber is waiting at the top of the basement stairs to beat him with a belt until he passes out if he tries to leave, as part of a cruel game. At Billy's suggestion, Finney uses a hidden cable to climb up to the basement window; however, his weight pulls out the grate covering the pane, leaving him with no way to reach it again.

As Gwen confides to Terrence about her dreams of Finney's abduction, Wright and Miller question an eccentric man named Max, who stays in the area with his brother and has shown great interest in the Grabber's crimes. Unbeknownst to him, Finney is being held in Max's basement, and the Grabber is actually his brother.

Finney receives a call from Griffin, a third victim, who gives him the combination to the lock securing the house's front door and tells him that the Grabber has fallen asleep. He sneaks out and unlocks the door, but the Grabber quickly recaptures Finney after his dog, Samson, barks to wake him. A fourth victim, a juvenile delinquent named Vance, calls to tell Finney he can break through a wall and into a freezer in the adjacent room. Finney does so but finds the freezer door locked. As Finney despairs over his fate, he receives one last call from Robin, who urges him to stand up for himself and fight back by packing the phone receiver with dirt to use as a bludgeon.

After seeing the Grabber's house in a vision, Gwen calls Wright and Miller to give them the address. The police rush to the house and find the bodies of the Grabber's victims buried in the basement. Meanwhile, Max realizes Finney is being held in the basement and rushes to free him, but the Grabber kills him with an axe. Upset that he had to kill his brother, the Grabber then attacks Finney, having decided to end his game. Finney uses the byproducts from his previous escape attempts to trap the Grabber in a pit he has dug, beats him with the receiver, and breaks his neck with the phone cord as his past victims taunt him.

Throwing a steak from the freezer to Samson as a distraction, Finney leaves the house, which turns out to be across the street from the one the police have raided. Terrence tearfully begs Finney and Gwen to forgive his earlier treatment of them. Sometime later, now viewed as a hero at school, a newly confident Finney sits next to his crush in class and says she can call him Finn.

== Cast ==
- Mason Thames as Finney
- Madeleine McGraw as Gwen
- Jeremy Davies as Terrence
- James Ransone as Max
- E. Roger Mitchell as Detective Wright
- Troy Rudeseal as Detective Miller
- Miguel Cazarez Mora as Robin
- Ethan Hawke as the Grabber

In addition, with cameo voice appearances as the other deceased kidnap victims who help Finney with their phone calls, and briefly appear to Gwen, are: Tristan Pravong as Bruce, Jacob Moran as Billy, Brady Hepner as Vance and Banks Repeta as Griffin.

== Production ==
=== Development ===
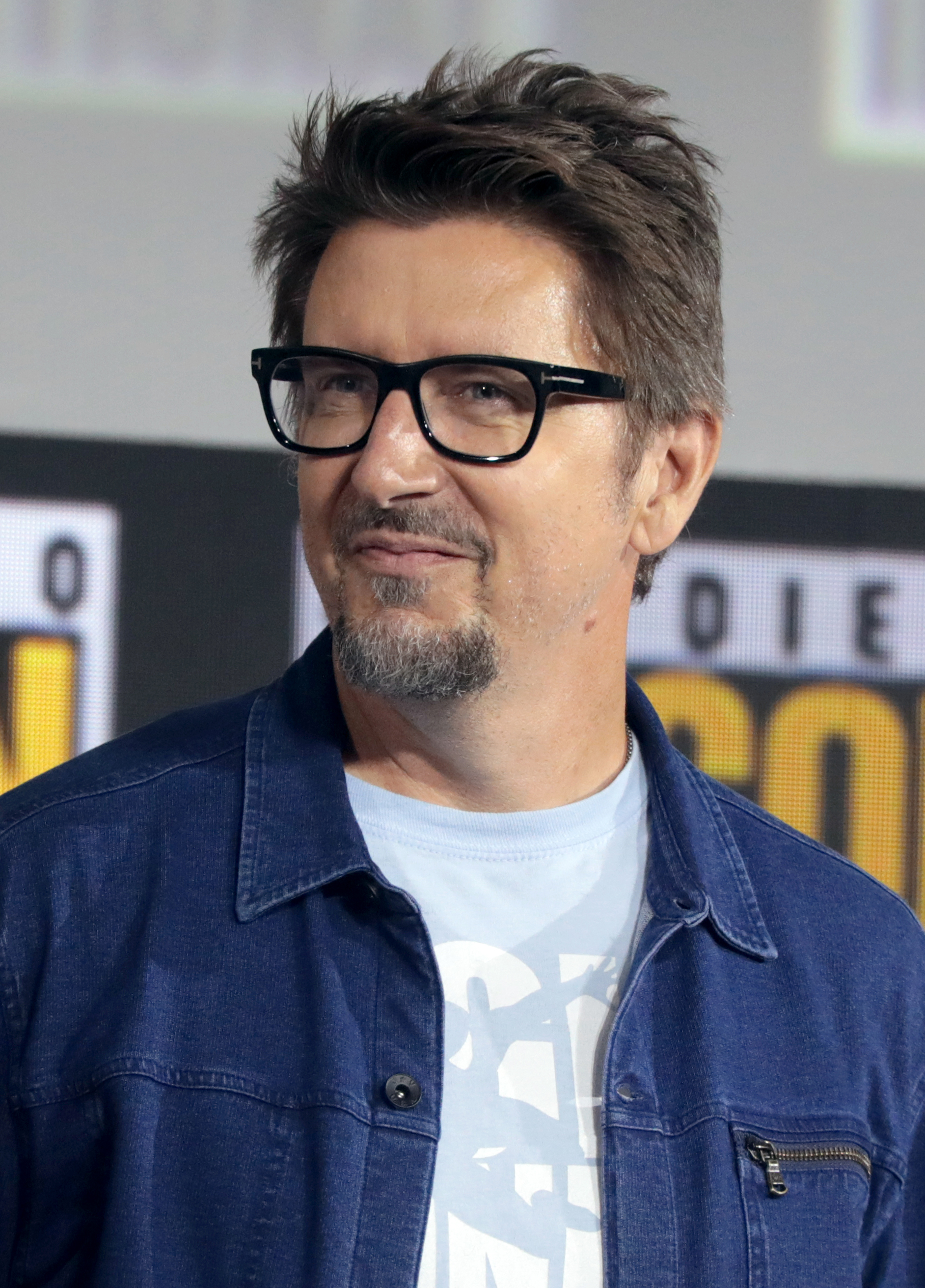
The Black Phone director Scott Derrickson in 2019

The Black Phone emerged from filmmakers Scott Derrickson and C. Robert Cargill's adaptation of Joe Hill's short story of the same name, published in the horror anthology 20th Century Ghosts (2005). Derrickson came across 20th Century Ghosts shortly after its initial US release. The director was eager to conceive a film faithful to "The Black Phone", which fascinated him in its framing of a conventional serial killer story, but struggled to produce ideas of his own devising. He shelved the project to focus on his professional relationship with Cargill, forged from Sinister (2012) and his contractual obligations to Marvel Studios as director of the Marvel Cinematic Universe (MCU) film Doctor Strange in the Multiverse of Madness (2022). Cargill briefly pitched for a replacement director in the interim, stopping once Derrickson convinced him to wait until he was available to commit. Their collaboration resumed after Derrickson resigned from the Doctor Strange (2016) sequel over disputes about the film's artistic direction.

To bolster The Black Phone's story, Derrickson used his upbringing in suburban Denver, Colorado, as a major source of inspiration. He gleaned from people in his everyday life to shape the characters, their circumstances, and the film's depiction of suburbia, including a child whose mother was raped, murdered, and disposed of in a lake wrapped in phone wire. The director described the area he grew up in as a working class neighborhood with "a lot of violence—everybody got whipped by their parents, there was fighting on the way to school, on the way home from school, at school." Derrickson raised the idea of a semi-autobiographical horror story as he was processing traumatic childhood experiences in therapy. He also investigated The 400 Blows (1959) and The Devil's Backbone (2001) for their depiction of resilience and kinship among children.

=== Casting ===
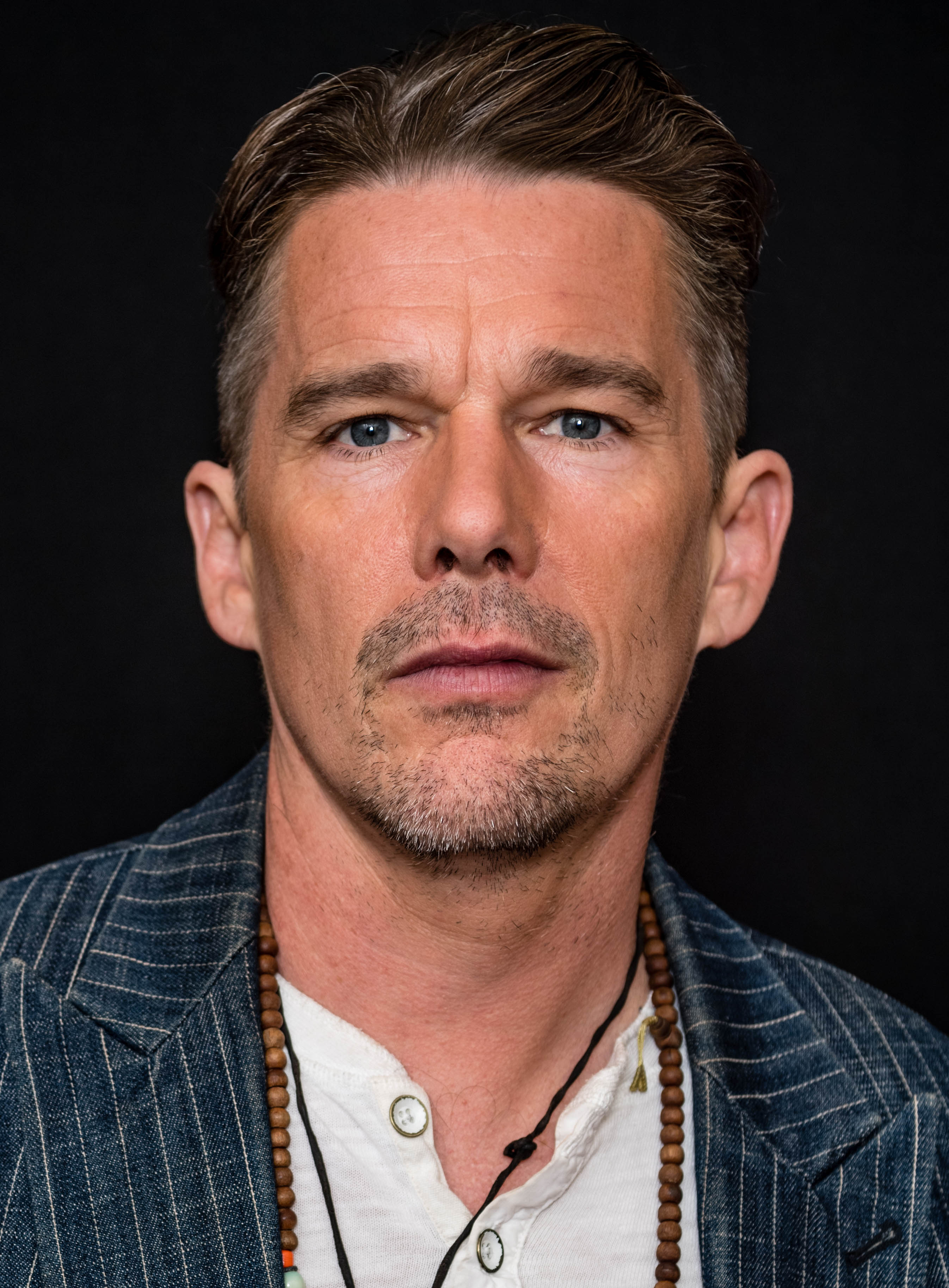
Actor Ethan Hawke in 2018

Agents scouted hundreds of child actors for The Black Phone's starring roles. They ultimately hired Mason Thames and Madeleine McGraw as the first significant casting choices, from auditions conducted on Zoom as a result of the ongoing COVID-19 pandemic. McGraw was considered among four actresses, and when a prior commitment to Disney's television series Secrets of Sulphur Springs forced her to pull out, the producers postponed filming of The Black Phone by several months to accommodate her schedule. Casting for Finney was not as immediate of an undertaking. It took months for the filmmakers to survey the actors—first through talent agencies in New York and Los Angeles, then an open call—before they were shown Thames's demo reels. Even though Thames lacked acting experience, The Black Phone being his film debut, he reportedly stood apart from others in his ability to emote and take direction. Due to the amount of violence and profanity in the script, Derrickson carefully broached the subject to Thames, McGraw, and their parents in preparation for scenes.

By early 2021, the starring cast featured Jeremy Davies, Ethan Hawke, and James Ransone, the latter two in their second film with Derrickson after Sinister. The director and Cargill did not envision one particular actor as The Grabber in their original character treatments, but sent Hawke the script because they had a rapport. Hawke was disinclined to play villainous parts as he feared being typecast. Yet The Black Phone story resonated with the actor, and the idea of The Grabber being concealed by a mask further enticed him. Hawke's experience on the set of Sinister was another influence shaping his decision. He developed his performance by honing expression in his voice and body. Derrickson did not have many discussions with Hawke regarding The Grabber's portrayal because he felt showing him the mask would best yield their desired interpretation.

=== Filming ===
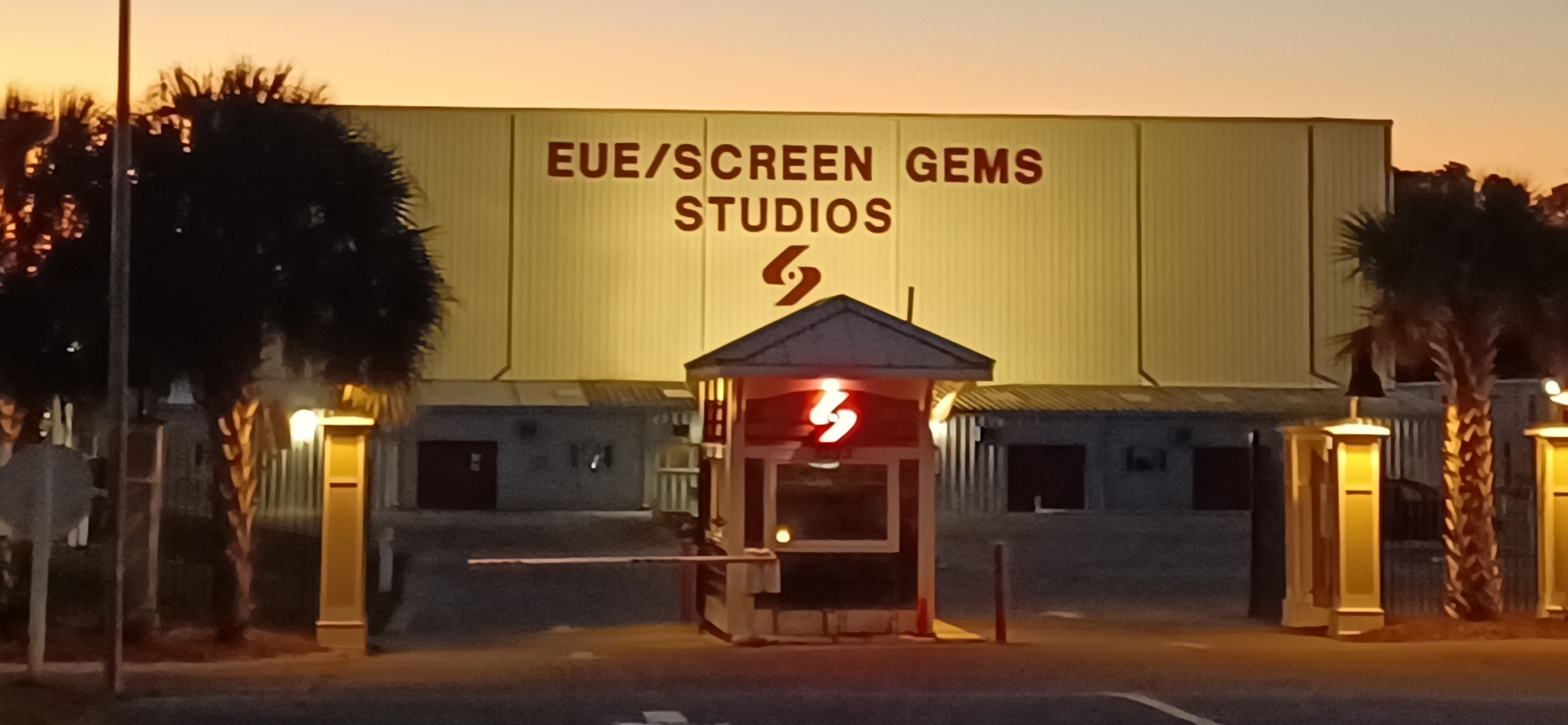
Entrance of the EUE/Screen Gems Wilmington facility (pictured in 2022), where most of the film was shot

Principal photography began on February 9, 2021, in Wilmington, North Carolina, under the pseudonym Static. A private residence used for interior and exterior shots was the shoot's initial location. The production base was confined mostly to EUE/Screen Gems's local film studio, from sets portraying The Grabber's basement, and adjacent neighborhoods. Estimates to realize the shoot ran between $16–18 million, the budget partially funded by a $4.7 million transferable tax credit on in-state costs from the North Carolina government. Elsewhere regionally, shooting occurred in New Hanover, Brunswick, and Columbus counties. Filming for The Black Phone ended on March 27, 2021.

Brett Jutkiewicz was The Black Phone's director of photography. Jutkiewicz had just finished filming Scream (2022) when he received the script from his agent. Derrickson approached him in mid-December 2020 to discuss ideas raised from Jutkiewicz's reading of The Black Phone script. They also bonded from discussing Jutkiewicz's work in the satirical horror film Ready or Not (2019), which had impressed Derrickson. After an interviewing period, the producers formally contracted Jutkiewicz that January. Derrickson's instruction was to implement a look evoking the 1970s period in which the film is set. The production used source material, such as New York-set 1970s movies, not so much to glean textural ideas as to establish the appropriate tone for the setting and storytelling. This, according to Jutkiewicz, meant experimenting with color grading techniques to produce a high contrast, muted, but not desaturated, visual palette. To achieve this image quality, and to reduce the picture's range of hues, filmmakers mixed colors using specialized lookup tables (LUT). The choice of LUTs was contingent on the brightness of sets; for example, Jutkiewicz employed a darker LUT to preserve the image palette of dimly-lit basement scenes.

The camera crew shot the dream sequences in Super 8 format, an established practice of Derrickson's repertoire, using Bolex cameras. They prepared by testing the utility of footage in Kodak's color negative film stock—the Vision3 500T 5219/7219, Vision3 50D 7203, and Vision3 250D 5207/7207. Lighting determined the film stock deployed for the shooting. Jutkiewicz said that he at first struggled working in Super 8 format as he had to reacquaint with old filmmaking methods.

=== Visual effects ===
VFX Legion was responsible for The Black Phone's visual effects, in their second project with Derrickson. Development of the visual effects began in pre-production, under the supervision of VFX Legion co-founders James David Hattin and Nate Smalley. Their work for the film comprised 200 shots of matte and digital compositing effects, such as green screening, set extensions, superimposed practical stunt effects, camera transitions, computer-generated imagery (CGI), and rig removal. Maya, Nuke, Houdini, and Redshift were among the software used to handle rendering and animation tasks. VFX Legion was also present on set to critique the shoot and rectify problems with the filmmaking.

One of the special effect team's most complex assignments was rendering the stunt of a Grabber victim's violent retreat to the spiritual realm. VFX Legion supervisor Ken Johnson managed the scene's filming on set. VFX Legion then developed a digital model of the actor from a 3D scan animated with retopologized graphics and textures, allowing them to employ ragdoll physics for fluid movement. This was a labor-intensive process because the filmmakers wanted the movement of the digital model to project a loss of control, and the stunt's combined animation to be slow enough to show that the victim was being forced into a void. Another challenging sequence saw VFX Legion modify in-home tracking shots with CGI, which entailed altering the frame rate of footage to maintain a continuously steady speed.

==== Masks ====
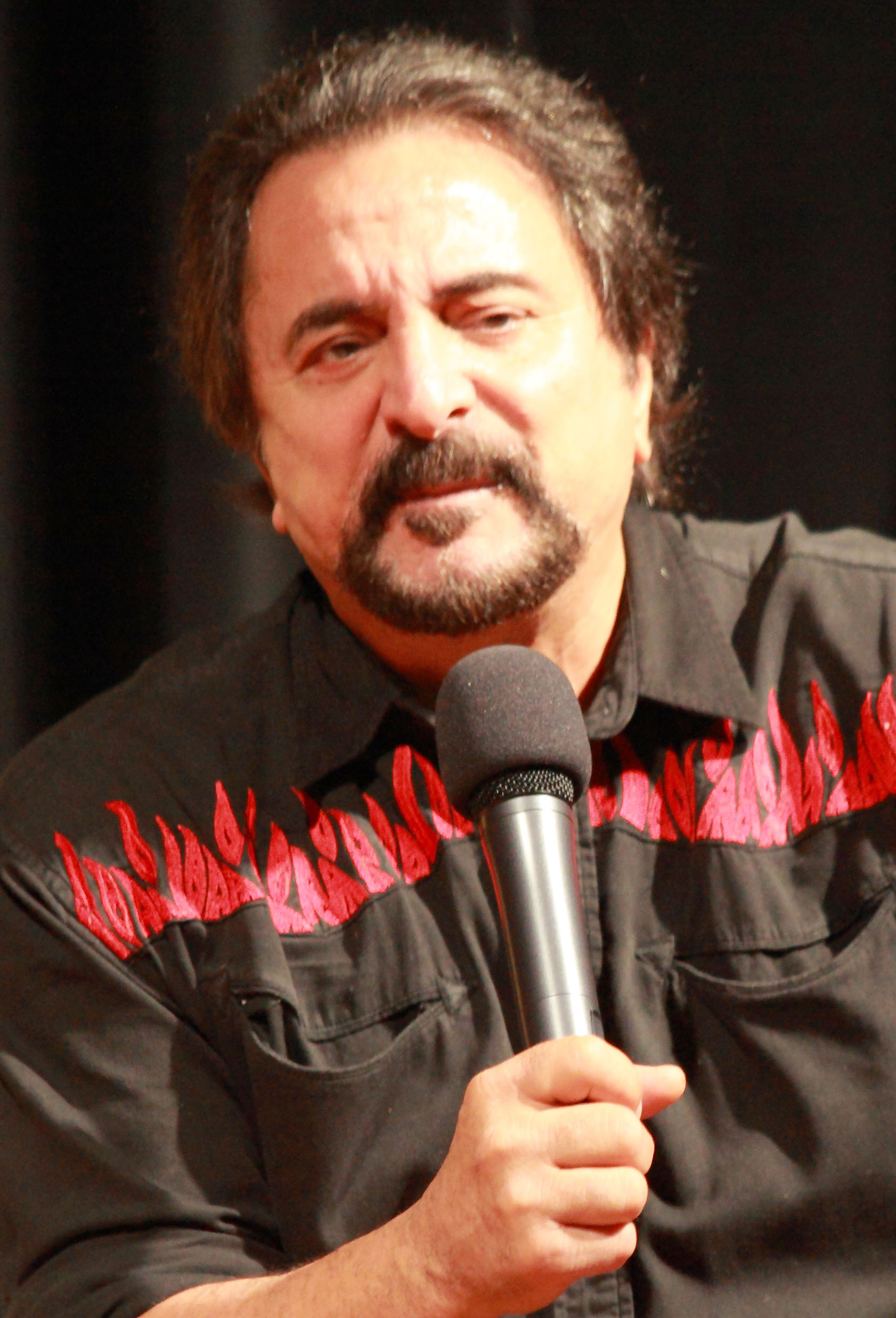
Makeup-effects artist Tom Savini pictured in 2014. Savini's Callosum Studios handled the creation of The Grabber's masks.

Designing The Grabber's masks became a core goal, in part because Blumhouse Productions planned to showcase them in ads for the film. While the script detailed a prototype of two worn leather masks painted with a smiling and a frowning devil, this concept evolved when Derrickson proposed the addition of a mouthless mask. They convey despair, joy, and nihility in exaggerated form, reminiscent of tragic comic masks of ancient Greek theatre. Derrickson and Blumhouse producer Ryan Turek solicited five visual effects companies for the mask-making, including Callosum Studios, a Pittsburgh-based studio founded by prosthetic makeup artists Jason Baker and Tom Savini. Of the illustrations submitted, Callosum's most closely resembled the vision of the producers. Savini and Baker were engaged to handle the creation of up to 30 masks for gags, stunts, specific scenes, and pandemic mitigation, in a process that lasted a month. The approval of sketches took about two weeks, followed by the construction of pieces in about a day or two. The filmmakers drew on diverse material for reference, among them ceramic masks, circus masks, antique dolls, William Hickey's Coney Island Barker, the horror film Mr. Sardonicus (1961), and the exaggerated grin of Conrad Veidt's Gwynplaine in the silent film The Man Who Laughs (1928).

Derrickson imagined the mouthless mask after Hawke was hired, since he wanted the actor's face to be partially displayed in some of The Black Phone. He developed the design further by envisioning scenarios that examined The Grabber's motivations, his choice of masks in interactions with Finney, et cetera. The fully realized concept surfaced from Savini's original sketches, at which point the filmmakers began contemplating age, consistency, and the application of each mask. They constructed the pieces from moldings of procured life masks of Hawke's face, a task complicated by the COVID-19 pandemic. Callosum conducted the face casting sessions in Hawke's home office in New York because the actor was not comfortable traveling. They then sculpted masks from their Pittsburgh studio before returning to New York for test fittings. The finished pieces were created from a fiberglass-resin mixture paneled with felt and foam padding. As well, the filmmakers constructed replicas for stunts out of lightweight rubber and latex.

=== Music ===
The Black Phone came to composer Mark Korven's attention once his agent and Blumhouse had correspondence. Derrickson outlined the film's pastiche musical approach in early conversations, calling for a score drawing on modern and vintage synthesizer-heavy sounds. Korven's objective was to tie together the music and subtext, chiefly themes of fear, confinement, and the perils of the human condition, to highlight The Grabber. He developed The Grabber's character motifs with abrasive strings accompaniments and friction noise produced from rubbing mallets on rough surfaces. The other characters were of minor focus except for "lighter, more feminine" tones for Gwen-centric scenes and a strings arrangement that accompanied the film's resolution.

== Release ==
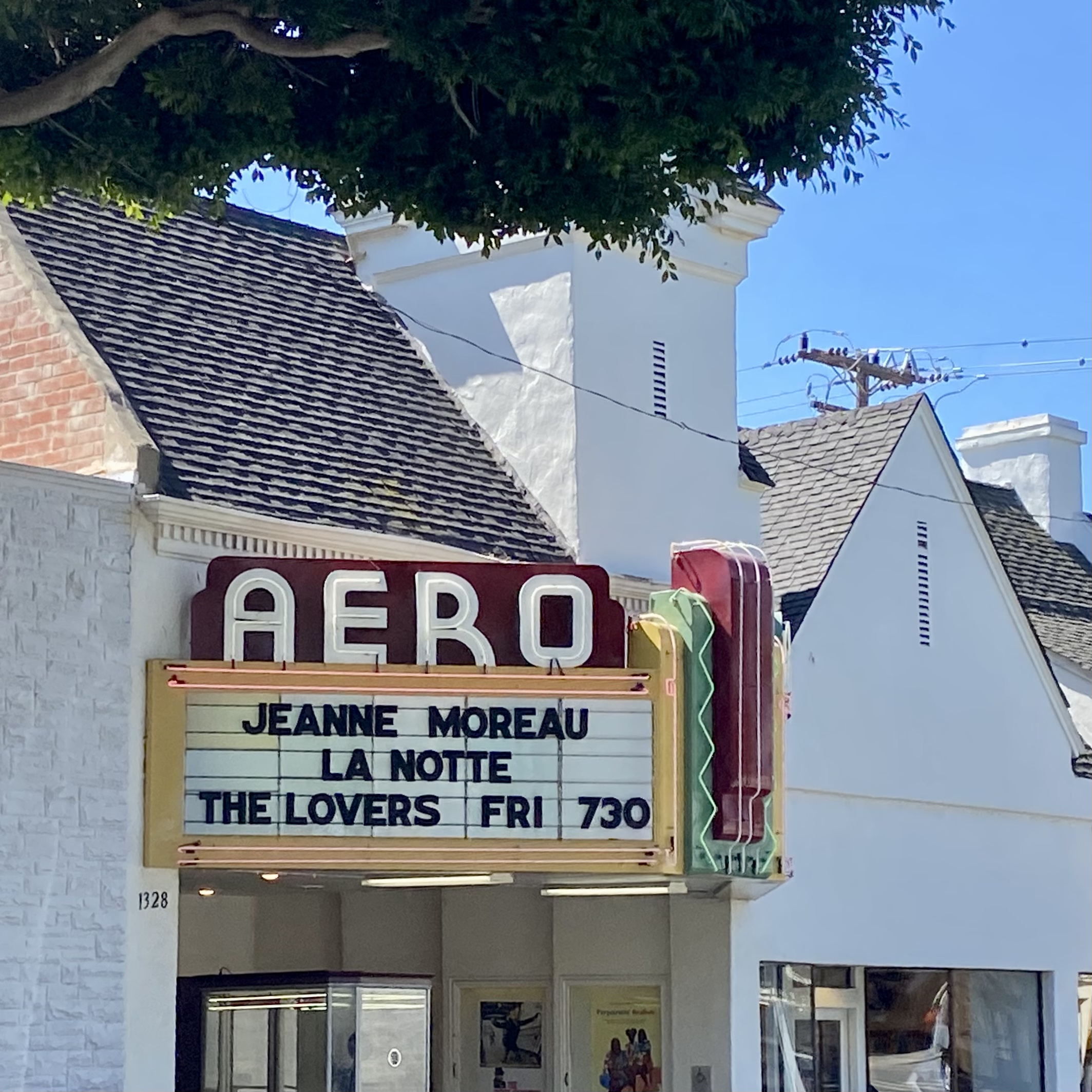
One of The Black Phone's festival premieres took place at the Aero Theatre in Santa Monica (pictured in 2023).

The Black Phone premiered at Fantastic Fest on September 25, 2021. The film screened at the Aero Theatre in Santa Monica for the 9th Beyond Fest that October and, in the next year, headlined New Orleans' Overlook Film Festival as the event's closing title. It finished its festival itinerary at the 2022 Tribeca Festival, part of the fest's late-night lineup. Universal Pictures released The Black Phone in US theaters on June 24, 2022, after delaying the film twice from its scheduled early 2022 release. The studio's marketing campaign promoted the viewing experience rather than the film's actors or story elements. They began the promotional cycle in August 2021 with a trade show exhibit at CinemaCon, where the first teaser trailer debuted. The official trailer was released in October 2021. Derrickson unveiled the theatrical release poster in conjunction with The Black Phone's Fantastic Fest premiere, sporting the tagline, "Never talk to strangers."

=== Home media ===
Universal released The Black Phone on digital formats on July 14, 2022, Blu-ray and DVD on August 16, and 4K Ultra HD Blu-ray on October 3, 2023. Physical copies contain deleted scenes, behind-the-scenes analyses about production, cinematography and The Grabber, and a short film titled Shadowprowler. It was the third-best selling DVD and Blu-ray release in its first week of US sales, selling 34,985 copies and earning $855,633. The Black Phone is also available to authenticated subscribers of NBCUniversal's streaming service Peacock.

== Reception ==
=== Box office ===
The Black Phone was considered a surprise box office success, as studios anticipated meager profits for theaters screening lower-budget films, closed as a consequence of COVID-19 pandemic control measures. The film finished its theatrical run grossing $90.1 million in the United States and Canada (55.8% of its earnings) and $71.3 million internationally (44.2%), for a global total of $161.4 million. Of this figure, $67.8 million was estimated to have been yielded by Blumhouse and Universal in net profit, factoring in advertising, production, interest, administrative overhead, residuals, and miscellaneous costs.

After securing $3 million from advanced screenings, the film received a wide release across 3,150 theaters in the United States. It opened as the fourth-highest-grossing movie of the week with $23.3 million, moderately exceeding the pre-release estimates of $15–20 million. About $1.7 million of this figure came from Los Angeles-area cinemas alone. New York, Dallas, Chicago, Houston, Atlanta, San Francisco, Phoenix, Philadelphia, and Washington also represented much of the film's biggest takings. Exit polling conducted during opening night revealed the average opinion moviegoers gave the film was positive, ranging from a B+ on CinemaScore to an 86% score on PostTrak. Audiences skewed younger, and the main reasons given to see the film were the trailer, the Blumhouse connection, and Hawke. The following weekend saw the theater count peak to 3,156 despite box office figures dropping by 48%, and The Black Phone finished the third week as the number six film with $7.66 million. In the fourth weekend, the film slipped further to the number seven position with a gross of $5.3 million, its theater count narrowing to 2,271. The Black Phone remained one of the top ten highest-grossing films for seven consecutive weeks. By August 2022, the film's domestic gross topped $85.8 million.

The Black Phone debuted overseas grossing $13.4 million from 45 countries, for a total sum of $35.8 million. Mexico comprised the largest portion of earnings with $3.4 million, reportedly one of the country's all-time biggest-opening grosses for a horror film, followed by the United Kingdom ($1.7 million), the Middle East ($1.4 million, including $700,000 from Saudi Arabia), France ($800,000), and Spain ($600,000). Second week earnings dropped by just 28% to $8.3 million, thanks to the film's continued global rollout and sustained momentum in Mexico, Europe, and Saudi Arabia. Expansion into Australia ($1.54 million), Brazil ($1.3 million), and several overseas markets buoyed The Black Phone's performance in the week of July 24, grossing $6.9 million. By September 11, the film's offshore gross exceeded $69.7 million.

=== Critical response ===
The Black Phone opened to mostly favorable reviews. On the review aggregator website Rotten Tomatoes, 81% of 271 critics' reviews are positive, with an average rating of 7.0/10. The website's consensus reads: "The Black Phone might have been even more frightening, but it remains an entertaining, well-acted adaptation of scarily good source material." Metacritic, which uses a weighted average, assigned the film a score of 65 out of 100, based on 38 critics, indicating "generally favorable" reviews.

A commonly discussed aspect in the media was the scriptwriting. They were inclined to compare The Black Phone to Hill's short story based on tone and style, with critics saying the film script augmented ideas faithful to the source material. (Note: Attributed to multiple sources:) Another point of notice was the script's treatment of a traditional serial killer story in the approach and period setting, which Chicago Sun-Times stated made for "one of the better cinematic nightmares in recent years". On the other hand, the media differed over the handling of ideas, often singling out the film's supernatural elements for further scrutiny, with one review from Variety claiming its emphasis undermined tension-building in the story. Others felt that The Black Phone's depicted concept fell short of their expectation. (Note: Attributed to multiple sources:) Plodding characterization and pacing was ascribed to mistakes in the writing, although the Los Angeles Times singled out intense basement-set conversational scenes with Finney as the film's most compelling moments. The harshest reviews accused The Black Phone of being repetitive, tasteless, and "tortuously overwritten".

=== Accolades ===
Year	Award	Category	Nominee(s)	Result	Ref.
2022	Hollywood Critics Association Midseason Film Awards	Best Horror	The Black Phone	Nominated	
2022	Hollywood Music in Media Awards	Original Score — Horror Film	Mark Korven	Nominated	
2022	Saturn Awards	Best Horror Film	The Black Phone	Won	
2022	Saturn Awards	Best Supporting Actor in a Film	Ethan Hawke	Nominated	
2022	Saturn Awards	Best Writing	C. Robert Cargill and Scott Derrickson	Nominated	
2022	Saturn Awards	Best Younger Actor in a Film	Madeleine McGraw	Nominated	
2022	Saturn Awards	Best Younger Actor in a Film	Mason Thames	Nominated	
2023
2023	Bram Stoker Award	Superior Achievement in Screenwriting	C. Robert Cargill and Scott Derrickson	Won	
2023	Hollywood Critics Association Film Awards	Best Horror Film	The Black Phone	Won	
2023	Fangoria Chainsaw Awards	Best Wide Release	The Black Phone	Won	
2023	Fangoria Chainsaw Awards	Best Supporting Performance	Madeleine McGraw	Won	
2023	Fangoria Chainsaw Awards	Best Supporting Performance	Ethan Hawke	Nominated	
2023	Fangoria Chainsaw Awards	Best Screenplay	C. Robert Cargill and Scott Derrickson	Won	
2023	Fangoria Chainsaw Awards	Editor's Eyeball on the Future Award	Mason Thames	Won	

== Sequel and related media ==
Hill pitched Derrickson follow-up ideas examining The Black Phone characters as early as June 2022. Derrickson discussed the possibility of a sequel further while embarking on the press tour for The Black Phone. The film's success led to immediate negotiations that August, and by October 2023, Universal commissioned The Black Phone 2 with a scheduled release date of June 27, 2025. Derrickson and Cargill will resume their screenwriting duties, while Hawke, Thames, McGraw, Davies and Mora are expected to reprise their roles. In May 2024, Universal postponed The Black Phone 2's theatrical release by four months, to October 17, 2025, after commissioning several new Blumhouse films for the calendar year.

The Black Phone canon was expanded further in the anthology short film "Dreamkill" for V/H/S/85, released on Shudder on October 6, 2023. "Dreamkill" occurs seven years after the events of The Black Phone, and explores the life of Gwen's cousin Gunther (Dashiell Derrickson).

The Grabber appears as a playable character in Fortnite during 2025's Fortnitemares. He joined the game on October 16.
