= Black Phone 2 =

2025 film by Scott Derrickson

- Theatrical release poster
- Directed by: Scott Derrickson
- Written by: Scott Derrickson; C. Robert Cargill
- Based on: "The Black Phone" by Joe Hill
- Produced by: Jason Blum; Scott Derrickson; C. Robert Cargill
- Starring: Mason Thames; Madeleine McGraw; Jeremy Davies; Demián Bichir; Ethan Hawke
- Cinematography: Pär M. Ekberg
- Edited by: Louise Ford
- Music by: Atticus Derrickson
- Production companies: Blumhouse Productions; Crooked Highway
- Distributed by: Universal Pictures
- Release dates: September 20, 2025 (Fantastic Fest); October 17, 2025 (United States)
- Running time: 114 minutes
- Country: United States
- Language: English
- Budget: $30 million
- Box office: $132.7 million

Black Phone 2 is a 2025 American supernatural horror film directed by Scott Derrickson who co-wrote it with C. Robert Cargill. It serves as a sequel to The Black Phone (2021). It is the second feature film in the Black Phone film series. The film stars Mason Thames, Madeleine McGraw, Jeremy Davies, and Ethan Hawke reprising their roles from the first film, with Demián Bichir also joining the cast. The story sees siblings Finney and Gwen, along with their friend Ernesto, head to a winter youth camp to uncover a mystery regarding the first victims of the Grabber, whose ghostly presence now haunts the camp.

Black Phone 2 premiered at Fantastic Fest on September 20, 2025, and was released in the United States by Universal Pictures on October 17. The film received generally positive reviews from critics and grossed $132.7 million worldwide on a budget of $30 million.

== Plot ==
In 1982, four years after Finney Blake killed the Grabber, (Note: As depicted in The Black Phone (2021)) his sister Gwen begins having dreams where she sees murders that happened at Alpine Lake Camp in 1957. During one, she receives a call from her mother Hope, who at the time of the 1957 murders was having similar dreams. Gwen convinces Finney and Ernesto, the brother of the late Robin Arellano, to travel to Alpine Lake Camp. A heavy blizzard traps them there with the camp owner Armando, his niece Mustang, and two camp employees, Kenneth and Barbara. The three kids begin investigating what Gwen's dreams might mean.

On the second night, Finney receives a call on the camp's dead payphone, this time from the Grabber. Claiming to have escaped from Hell, the Grabber vows revenge, blaming Finney for forcing him to kill his own brother and for ending his life. Moments later, Gwen is violently attacked in her dream by the Grabber but Finney, Ernesto, and Mustang manage to save her. The shaken group gathers in the camp's chapel, where Armando and the others realize they must find the bodies of the Grabber's victims from Alpine Lake Camp to loosen his power over the dream realm. The group deduces that the bodies are beneath Lake Maru.

As they investigate further, they discover that Armando, Hope, and the Grabber had all known each other at the camp long ago. That night, Gwen dreams of the Grabber; he reveals Hope did not commit suicide and he actually killed her, staging it to look self-inflicted. He then attempts to kill Gwen, with her injuries sustained in the dream manifesting in reality. She manages to gain power in her dream and fight back before being woken up by Finney and Ernesto. Meanwhile, Armando is searching for the boys' bodies. The next day, Finney's and Gwen's father Terrence arrives, having borrowed a snowplow to get there. Gwen confronts both Terrence and Finney on their abuse of alcohol and drugs to avoid thinking about their traumatic pasts. They decide to stay to defeat the Grabber and put the murdered boys to rest.

Later, joined by Kenneth and Barbara, the group returns to the frozen lake to recover the three missing boys. Gwen prays to stay alive and succeed in her mission to find the boys. As they search, Gwen falls asleep again and is attacked by the Grabber. The Grabber also attempts to murder Finney, Terrence, Kenneth, and Barbara.

During the struggle, Gwen locates the boys' bodies beneath the ice, removing the Grabber's power. Finney, Gwen, and the spirits of the murdered boys attack the Grabber, and he is dragged beneath the frozen lake. The next day, as Gwen, Finney and Ernesto prepare to leave, Gwen answers a call on the payphone, in which Hope tells Gwen that she is proud of her.

== Cast ==
- Ethan Hawke as the Grabber, a serial killer who was previously killed by Finney
- Mason Thames as Finney Blake, the Grabber's only known survivor
- Madeleine McGraw as Gwen, Finney's younger sister
- Demián Bichir as Armando, the owner of Alpine Lake camp
- Miguel Mora as Ernesto, the brother of Robin, who was one of the Grabber's victims and Finney's friend. Mora previously played Robin in the first film.
- Jeremy Davies as Terrence, Finney and Gwen's father
- Arianna Rivas as Mustang, Armando's niece
- Maev Beaty as Barbara, a camp employee
- Graham Abbey as Kenneth, a camp employee
- James Ransone as Max, the Grabber's brother who he killed prior to his death.
- Anna Lore as Hope, Finney and Gwen's late mother

== Production ==
In June 2022, Scott Derrickson said that while Joe Hill was protective of his 20th Century Ghosts eponymous story, the author had pitched him a "wonderful idea" for a sequel that he was open to directing if The Black Phone (2021) was a success. In August, Derrickson and Hill confirmed that there were discussions with the studio to make a sequel. Derrickson referred to the financial success of the first film as one of the catalysts for the project. Hill said his inspiration to writing a sequel was based on the "iconic imagery" of the Grabber's masks.

In November 2023, it was reported that Ethan Hawke, Mason Thames, Madeleine McGraw, and Jeremy Davies would reprise their roles from the first film. Miguel Cazarez Mora would also appear, though in a different role from the original. Derrickson returned as director and co-wrote the screenplay with C. Robert Cargill, with both also producing. In late 2024, Demián Bichir and Arianna Rivas joined the cast.

With the working title of Mysterium, principal photography began in Toronto, Mississauga, Hamilton, and Huntsville on November 4, 2024, with Pär M. Ekberg as the cinematographer. Filming concluded on January 23, 2025.

The film's score was composed by Atticus Derrickson, the director's son. The tracks "Subways of Your Mind" by FEX, a well-known lostwave song, and "Another Brick in the Wall" by Pink Floyd are also featured in the movie.

== Release ==
Black Phone 2 premiered at Fantastic Fest on September 20, 2025, and was released on October 17, 2025. It was originally set to be released on June 27, 2025.

Black Phone 2 was released on digital on November 4, 2025.

== Reception ==
=== Box office ===
Black Phone 2 grossed $77.4 million in the United States and Canada and $55.3 million internationally, for a worldwide total of $132.7 million. In the United States and Canada, Black Phone 2 made $2.6 million from Thursday previews. The film then topped the box office on its opening weekend, dethroning Tron: Ares, after making $27.3 million at the domestic box office.

=== Critical response ===
On the review aggregator website Rotten Tomatoes, 72% of 196 critics' reviews are positive, with an average rating of 6.3/10. The website's consensus reads: "Taking the consequences of its predecessor seriously, Black Phone 2 is a chilling sequel that mines memorable scares and thought-provoking themes from the scars that linger." Metacritic, which uses a weighted average, assigned the film a score of 61 out of 100, based on 37 critics, indicating "generally favorable" reviews. Audiences polled by CinemaScore gave the film an average grade of B on an A+ to F scale, lower than the B+ earned by its predecessor.

Bret Eckelberry of Plugged In concluded that Black Phone 2 is "a horror flick with heart". Katie Walsh of the Los Angeles Times felt that it was "a bit surprising that Black Phone 2 turns out to be so pious and deeply Christian, which is a bit of an odd mix".

=== Accolades ===
The film received nominations at the 9th Astra Film Awards for Best Horror or Thriller Feature, Best Performance in a Horror or Thriller (Ethan Hawke), and Best Young Performer (Madeleine McGraw). At the 4th Astra Creative Arts Awards, the film received a nomination for Best Visual Effects. The film received a nomination for Original Score – Horror/Thriller Film at the 16th Hollywood Music in Media Awards. The film was also nominated for two Saturn Awards, for Best Cinematic Adaptation Film and Best Younger Performer in a Film for McGraw's performance.

== Future ==
In October 2025, Derrickson stated that he would only develop a third film if the story can be better than the previous two installments, expressing that he wants the series to be quality over quantity. Hawke expressed interest in reprising his villainous role in a sequel, stating that he would like to explore the background story of the Grabber, his journey into Hell, and his continued hauntings of other characters. Hill stated that he foresees the potential for various sequels but acknowledged that their reality depends on the financial success of Black Phone 2. Cargill acknowledged the potential for another film but echoed Derrickson's thoughts by stating that they would only start production if the creatives could develop a story that is worthy of realizing.
