= V/H/S/85 =

2023 film

- Promotional release poster
- Directed by: Mike P. Nelson ("No Wake" and "Ambrosia"); Gigi Saul Guerrero ("God of Death"); Natasha Kermani ("TKNOGD"); Scott Derrickson ("Dreamkill"); David Bruckner ("Total Copy")
- Written by: Mike P. Nelson ("No Wake" and "Ambrosia"); Gigi Saul Guerrero ("God of Death"); Zoe Cooper ("TKNOGD"); Scott Derrickson ("Dreamkill"); C. Robert Cargill ("Dreamkill"); Evan Dickson ("Total Copy")
- Produced by: Josh Goldbloom; Brad Miska; Pavel Antonov; David Bruckner; Radio Silence; James Harris
- Production companies: Studio71; Bloody Disgusting; Cinepocalypse Productions; Reserva Films
- Distributed by: Shudder
- Release dates: September 22, 2023 (Fantastic Fest); October 6, 2023
- Running time: 111 minutes
- Countries: United States; Mexico
- Languages: English; Spanish

V/H/S/85 is a 2023 found footage horror anthology film produced by Studio71 and Bloody Disgusting. The sequel to V/H/S/99 (2022), it is the sixth installment in the V/H/S franchise, and crossover with the Black Phone film series. Set in 1985, the film comprises five found footage segments linked together by a sixth frame narrative directed by Mike P. Nelson, Gigi Saul Guerrero, Natasha Kermani, Scott Derrickson, and David Bruckner. The film is an international co-production between the United States and Mexico.

The film premiered at Fantastic Fest on September 22, 2023, and was released as a Shudder Original Film through the streaming service Shudder in the United States on October 6, 2023. A sequel, V/H/S/Beyond, was released on October 4, 2024.

== Plot ==
The film is presented as an anthology of five short horror films, built into a frame narrative which acts as its own sixth short horror film. Each short is linked together with the concept of found footage as each segment is from VHS tapes.

V/H/S/85 is the first installment in the franchise to have two segments directly connected with each other—"No Wake" and "Ambrosia." It is also the first installment in which a segment relates to another work by its filmmaker—Scott Derrickson's "Dreamkill" is a stand-alone sequel to his film The Black Phone (2021).

=== "Total Copy" (frame narrative) — Prologue ===
- Directed by David Bruckner
- Written by Evan Dickson; story by David Bruckner and Evan Dickson

The frame narrative, presented as a documentary, focuses on a team of scientists—Dr. Pike Spratling, Dr. Gary Newell, Dr. Margaret Porter, and Dr. Sarah Greyson—at Stamer University as they study a shapeshifting being named "Rory".

=== "No Wake" ===
- Written and directed by Mike P. Nelson

Seven friends—Rob, Anna, Jared, Drew, Robin, Kevin, and Kelly—travel in a recreational vehicle to camp at a nearby lake called "Lake Evic". The group, except for Anna and Jared, ignore several signs that warn visitors against swimming or entering the water.

While water skiing, Rob, Drew, Robin, Kevin, and Kelly are shot and killed by an unseen sniper on the shore. Moments later, the group, except Kevin, regain consciousness despite their fatal injuries and return to the shore, where they find Anna and Jared dead, and that their vehicle has the Roman numeral for seven painted on it with blood.

The survivors conclude that the lake has the ability to bring the dead back to life and, since they were the only ones to go swimming, only they were resurrected. They decide to enact revenge on their attacker as the footage ends.

=== "Total Copy" — First interlude ===
Back in the frame narrative, it is revealed that Rory was found on the top of a butte and brought to the university to be studied under Spratling's supervision. In hopes to educate the being about human culture, the scientists contain Rory in a small room with a television—which broadcasts exercise videos—as Spratling is convinced that they can communicate with it.

=== "God of Death" ===
- Written and directed by Gigi Saul Guerrero

In a fictional depiction of the 1985 Mexico City earthquake, a Mexican news crew is preparing for the morning news until a massive earthquake strikes during the broadcast, which kills the entire crew except for cameraman Luis. He is assisted by a rescue team—Eddie, Karla, Javier, and Miguel—as they attempt to make their way out of the building.

Javier is mortally wounded in an aftershock and forces Karla to expedite his death; the remaining quartet notice a crawl space and enter a room with walls made of skulls, where they find a statue of the Aztec god Mictlantecuhtli. Eddie is suddenly possessed by Mictlān, who then kills Miguel. Mictlān then materializes behind Eddie and rips out his heart, which he proceeds to eat.

Karla succumbs to Mictlān's influence and kills Luis, ripping out his heart as an offering. She is eventually killed when the room collapses, and a surviving news reporter broadcasts from outside the building explaining, "Today, September 19th, approximately 7:20 a.m., will be a day to remember" as the footage ends.

=== "Total Copy" — Second interlude ===
Rory has begun to display the ability to mutate into—and vaguely resemble—a human body; the footage is then interspersed with Greyson's interview. She says that when Rory's shapeshifting abilities were discovered, Spratling should have exhibited caution.

=== "TKNOGD" ===
- Directed by Natasha Kermani
- Written by Zoe Cooper; story by Zoe Cooper and Natasha Kermani

A performance artist with the stage name ″Ada Lovelace″ opens a show for a small audience in a theater. She explains that the world has killed God and replaced him with the "God of Technology", and introduces a demonstration video of a virtual reality software device that allows its user to exist simultaneously on the physical and digital plane.

When Ada adorns herself with a virtual reality headset, gloves, and a full body suit, another video is projected and shows what Ada sees through her headset, depicting an electronic landscape. Ada performs an incantation to awaken the "God of Technology" and taunts it as a "myth" until a mysterious entity appears on the screen.

An unnerved Ada tries to remove the headset, but the entity attacks her; her real life body mimics her virtual one as she is lifted, strangled, and thrown. Ada's hand is bitten off in the virtual world and, though she is able to remove the gloves, she finds that her real hand is gone. The entity then breaks Ada's leg, tears away her skin, and rips her other leg off entirely.

Ada screams and succumbs to her injuries; the shocked audience, who believe it was all part of Ada's performance, clap as her cameraman approaches her. He is able to lift the visor, where it is revealed that Ada's now exposed brain and facial tissue has fused with the headset. Ada's exposed eyes stare at the camera as the footage ends.

=== "Total Copy" — Third interlude ===
Seeing that the scientists are distracted, Rory has continued his mutation, now sporting several tentacle-like limbs with spikes at the end.

=== "Ambrosia" ===
- Written and directed by Mike P. Nelson

The Wrigley family host a celebration in honor of their teenage daughter Ruth, who films the occasion with her cousin James. Ruth's young relative Adam shoots her with a water gun, which he reveals was given to him by a "lady in an RV". That evening, the Wrigleys reveal that they are celebrating an old family tradition as a rite of passage that Ruth has completed.

She produces her passage's recording, in which she shot seven people dead at a lake shore. (Note: As depicted in the film's "No Wake" segment) When police officers surround the house, the family rushes to fight back. As the police raid the house and shoot Ruth's family dead, Ruth kills James after he confesses he is too frightened to fight. Ruth then begins a shootout with the police, but is killed.

As a coroner examines the bodies, Ruth regains consciousness despite her fatal injuries and, in shock, shoots the coroner. She shoots herself in the head, but remains alive and wails in great distress as she's arrested. The camera cuts to Robin—one of Ruth's victims from the lake shore massacre—filling the water gun she gave Adam with the lake's water as the footage ends.

=== "Total Copy" — Fourth interlude ===
Newell becomes disturbed when Rory takes on his appearance, as he is the only one that has never had a face-to-face with the being, and Greyson calls for an emergency meeting. She explains that Newell has never been in the chamber, then deduces that Rory can see through the one-way mirror that divides its containment chamber and the study room.

While Greyson expresses concern, Spratling sees it as a miracle and argues that Rory is breaching beyond its restraints to make contact with them. Greyson, in another interview, explains that Spratling did not deserve what happened to him.

=== "Dreamkill" ===
- Directed by Scott Derrickson
- Written by Scott Derrickson and C. Robert Cargill
- Set in the same cinematic universe as The Black Phone (2021)

In a first-person point-of-view, a serial killer enters a woman's house, ties her up, and brutally murders her while she is on the phone with emergency services. Lead detective Wayne Johnson recognizes the scene from a previous video of a similar murder. Another video shows the killer as he enters another house, fights the man inside, and brutally murders him as well.

The police come to the house and Wayne tells his partner Bobby Blake that he had already seen the murder on a tape he received earlier. Wayne investigates and finds out that Bobby's son Gunther is the one sending the tapes. Gunther claims that he saw the murders in his dreams and that they were being recorded on the tapes, but Wayne is skeptical. Bobby explains that their family has a psychic ability to see the future: Gunther's cousin Gwen had similar dreams when her brother Finney was kidnapped and his aunt died by suicide after having a series of disturbing dreams. (Note: As depicted in The Black Phone (2021))

A new tape is discovered, showing another murder where the victim was dismembered and beheaded. Bobby and Wayne recognize the location and decide to investigate. Outside the house, Wayne confronts Bobby about his involvement in the previous murders as it is revealed that Bobby had a connection with the victims: the women from the respective first and last video tapes accused him of sexual assault and stalking, and the man from the second video tape was their attorney.

Wayne also reveals that Bobby lost his job as a result of these accusations; he pleads with Bobby to tell the truth, but Bobby shoots him dead and then enters the house to carry out the murder depicted in Gunther's dream. In the police station, Gunther discovers that his dream is being replayed on the camera in the interrogation room. Bobby returns to the station and encounters Gunther, who then realizes his father is the killer. Gunther shares that he had a dream predicting the outcome of the situation. The police arrive and Bobby easily takes them down, only to get shot in the head from behind by Gunther, who drops the gun in a state of numb shock as the footage ends.

=== "Total Copy" — Epilogue ===
Rory is unresponsive to stimuli, which Spratling interprets as it being sick. Greyson disagrees and says that if Rory is as intelligent as Spratling says, then Rory could be manipulating him. Later that evening, Greyson abandons the study; she tries to convince Newell and Porter to follow her, but is unsuccessful.

In another interview, Greyson reveals that, while authorities have shared footage of what happened at the university, the documentary will not show it due to the images' disturbing nature and a concern for the well-being of viewers. The tape then cuts to a black screen, revealing that the following footage is property of Stamer University, leased to the show with no intention of distribution.

After Greyson leaves, Spratling sends Newell into Rory's room to give it an adrenaline shot. Before he can do so, Rory exposes his tentacle and wraps it around Newell's arm. While Spratling is able to get Newell out of the room, Rory sprouts another tentacle and uses it to drag both Newell and Porter back to its room to kill them.

Spratling and the cameraman attempt to escape but, due to Newell's blood on Spratling's hand, the door scanner cannot read his handprint. Rory's tentacles extend to the hallway and kill them both. Rory then uses its tentacles to grab the cameraman's corpse and drags him back to its room, where it begins to manipulate the corpses in an imitation of the exercise videos it previously watched.

== Cast ==
=== "Total Copy" ===
- Jordan Belfi as Dr. Pike Spratling
- Miller Tai as Dr. Gary Newell
- K.T. Thangavelu as Dr. Margaret Porter
- Kelli Garner as Dr. Sarah Greyson
- Chuck McCollum as Drake Rogers
- Mark Sipka as a tech
- Colton Little as a man on TV
- Shelby Steel as a woman on TV

=== "No Wake" / "Ambrosia" ===
- Alex Galick as Rob
- Anna Sundberg as Robin
- Chelsey Grant as Kelly
- Toussaint Morrison as Drew
- Tyler Nobel as Kevin
- Anna Hashizume as Anna
- Tom Reed as Jared
- Evie Bair as Ruth
- Renee Werbowski as Renee
- Mike Lester as James
- Justen Jones as Uncle Jeff
- Lauren Anderson as Aunt Susan
- Bonnie Sorenson as Carol
- Murray Nelson as Adam
- Christopher Gasser as Cousin Christopher
- Ed Noreen as Grandpa Art
- Kim Hermes as Coroner
- Jennifer Edwards as Barb

=== "God of Death" ===
- Gabriela Roel as Lucia de Leon
- Ari Gallegos as Luis
- Gigi Saul Guerrero as Gabriela Maldonaldo
- Marcio Moreno as Eddie
- Felipe De Lara as Miguel
- Florencia Rios as Karla
- Gerardo Oñate as Javier
- José María Higareda as Mictlān

=== "TKNOGD" ===
- Chivonne Michelle as Ada Lovelace
- Andrew Ghai as Stage Manager
- Rick Darge as The Inventor

=== "Dreamkill" ===
- James Ransone as Bobby Blake
- Freddy Rodríguez as Detective Wayne Johnson
- Dashiell Derrickson as Gunther Blake
- Britt Baron as Karen
- Dana DeRuyck as Forensic Tech
- Jennifer Peo-Nysmith as a detective
- Dani Deetté as an officer
- Myko Olivier as a 911 operator

== Production ==
In October 2022, Bloody Disgusting announced V/H/S/85 and that the film was secretly shot back-to-back alongside V/H/S/99. David Bruckner, Scott Derrickson, Gigi Saul Guerrero, Natasha Kermani and Mike P. Nelson were announced as directors while Josh Goldbloom, Brad Miska, Bruckner, Chad Villella, Matt Bettinelli-Olpin, Tyler Gillett and James Harris would produce the film.

=== Filming ===
Filming began in April 2022. In October 2022, Scott Derrickson confirmed his segment was already filmed.

== Release ==
V/H/S/85 had its world premiere at Fantastic Fest on September 22, 2023. The film was later released on October 6, 2023, via Shudder.

== Reception ==
On the review aggregator website Rotten Tomatoes, 73% of 52 critics' reviews are positive, with an average rating of 6.3/10. The website's consensus reads: "One of the franchise's stronger entries, V/H/S/85 largely avoids the quality control issues common to anthologies, with consistently creepy results." Metacritic, which uses a weighted average, assigned the film a score of 53 out of 100, based on 5 critics, indicating "mixed or average" reviews.

Jacob Hall of Slashfilm stated that "this is the first film in the series where it feels like every director is actively shooting for the moon," rating it 7 out of 10. Mary McAndrews of Dread Central wrote that "V/H/S/85 is perhaps the series' most consistent entry," praising the focus on cosmic horror and "the shifting cultural consciousness of the 80s," rating it 4 out of 5.

Emily Von Seele of Daily Dead deemed the film "an exceptionally strong entry" in the franchise, highlighting the consistent quality between segments with "no obvious weak link," rating it 5 out of 5. In a positive review for The Daily Texan, Ryan Ranc commented that "'V/H/S/85' stands out as one of the best in the long running franchise," pointing out the "very satisfying payoff" of the main wraparound story and rating the film 3.5 out of 5.

Kat Hughes of The Hollywood News praised the film as one of the best in the franchise, specifying Nelson's first segment, "No Wake", as "by far the bloodiest, messiest, and goriest of all the stories shown" and rating the film 4 out of 5.

== Sequel ==
On October 13, 2023, during the V/H/S/85 panel at New York Comic Con, Bloody Disgusting and Shudder confirmed that a seventh V/H/S film was in production, with the film being sci-fi. In July 2024, the film was revealed to be called V/H/S/Beyond and was released on October 4, 2024.

== See also ==
- List of ghost films
