= C. Robert Cargill =

American writer (born 1975)

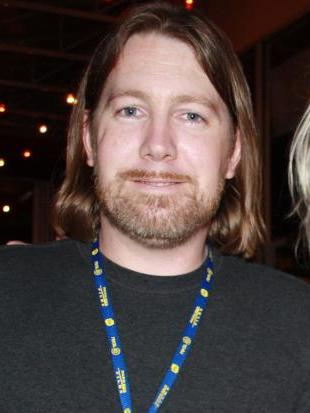
- Cargill at Fantastic Fest 2009
- Born: Christopher Robert Cargill; September 8, 1975 (age 51); San Antonio, Texas, U.S.
- Occupations: Screenwriter; novelist; podcast host

Christopher Robert Cargill (born September 8, 1975) is an American screenwriter, novelist, podcast host, and former film critic known under the pseudonyms Massawyrm (on Ain't It Cool News) and Carlyle (on Spill.com). Cargill currently resides in Austin, Texas, with his wife. He is known for writing the films Sinister (2012), Sinister 2 (2015), Doctor Strange (2016), and The Black Phone (2021). He is a frequent writing collaborator of Scott Derrickson.

== Early life ==
Cargill was raised in a military family, growing up on army bases around the United States. He held several jobs prior to writing, including video store clerk and travel agent.

== Career ==
=== Film critic ===
Cargill wrote his first article in 2000, when he volunteered to write a review of the movie Crouching Tiger, Hidden Dragon for a website called "Guerilla Films." His article managed to get the highest amount of traffic of over 50,000 hits, "a HUGE deal" at the time, which secured him the job to write more reviews.

While working for Guerilla Films, Cargill began spending time with Ain't It Cool News' Eric Vespe (AKA 'Quint' on the site), which landed him a job on Ain't It Cool's "Indie Indie Column," a previously abandoned post. He began writing for Ain't It Cool News under the name Massawyrm in May 2001. His first review for the blog was of Jon Favreau's movie, Made. During his work as a blogging critic, Cargill met various directors, which occasionally led to small roles in independent productions. In 2011, he told Jordan Gass-Pooré with Slackerwood that it was getting "tougher and tougher" to write movie reviews because of his relationships with people in the movie industry. "I've always had a strict code about writing about films made by people I'm friends with," said Cargill. "It's harder to write objectively about film without people feeling that you're being biased." Besides his work for Ain't It Cool News and his involvement with Spill.com, he also did freelance work for Film.com and Hollywood.com (the site that owned Spill.com).

=== Novelist ===
I considered every film another day of classes and writing a review a home work assignment and it was graded by everyone who wrote nasty comments on the internet.

— C. Robert Cargill

Having wanted to be a fiction writer from a young age, Cargill considered every film he reviewed and its feedback as a learning experience. According to an interview with The Austin Chronicle he compared it to "a strenuous, endless crash course—maybe even a master class—in what does and doesn't work in a story."

On the 26th of February 2013, Cargill released his first novel, Dreams and Shadows, an urban fantasy story of folklore and mythology, which also follows three modern characters from childhood to adulthood. Subsequent novels included Sea of Rust and Day Zero.

=== Screenwriter ===
The idea for his first film came to fruition when he met up with a fan and friend Scott Derrickson at a bar in Las Vegas where he pitched his idea for Sinister. Derrickson, showing great interest in this concept, contacted producer Jason Blum who particularly liked the simplicity of the concept and understood the urge to make it as fast as possible before it could be made by anyone else. Shooting of the movie started in September 2011, 6 months after and was first screened at South by Southwest. In an interview with Film.com, Cargill stated that his days as a film critic were over for the time being due to his success and dedication to his new-found career path. "I may pop in every once in a while and write up reviews, but ever since I was a child, I've wanted to be a fiction writer, and now I have the chance to do it in both formats that I am in love with." Sinister was released to positive reviews with many praising the snuff film segments, directing, cinematography, atmosphere, and acting. It was a box office success grossing over $87 million on a $3 million budget. Both Cargill and Derrickson returned as writers for Sinister 2 (2015), which was directed by Ciaran Foy. Unlike its predecessor, the sequel was critically panned. Many criticisms were aimed at the overuse of jump scares, horror cliches, story, and heavy amounts of excessive violence and gore. Cargill and Derrickson were working on a movie adaptation of the Deus Ex video games. They both left the project after Kevin Feige hired them to work on a film adaptation of Doctor Strange in 2014, which would become the 14th film in the Marvel Cinematic Universe.

Cargill, along with Derrickson and Jon Spaihts, worked on the script for Marvel's Doctor Strange (2016). The film received positive reviews from critics and audiences, With praise being aimed towards the acting, special effects, and musical score. It grossed over $677 million worldwide. Cargill and Derrickson were set to return for Doctor Strange in the Multiverse of Madness but left due to "creative differences". Sam Raimi was hired to helm the project after they left. More recently, the writing duo of Derrickson and Cargill signed a deal with Blumhouse Television.

Cargill, under the pseudonym of Kit Lesser, wrote a biopic about FBI agent William Hagmaier (played by Elijah Wood) and his relationship with serial killer Ted Bundy. "There have been a lot of movies and a lot of media made about Ted Bundy, and one of the things that bugged me a lot was that it's all kind of selling the myth of Ted Bundy and kind of glorifying him in a way," Cargill told Jordan Gass-Poore, the host of the horror-comedy podcast, Pod of Madness. "And the deeper you dig into the story you realize there's nothing to mystify here, there's nothing amazing about him." The film was released in 2021 as No Man of God.

Derrickson's departure from directing Doctor Strange in the Multiverse of Madness led him to The Black Phone, a project he and Cargill had already planned on making. It is an adaptation of Joe Hill's short story of the same name. The film premiered at Fantastic Fest on September 25, 2021, and was theatrically released by Universal Pictures on June 24, 2022. It has grossed $157.2 million and received generally positive reviews from critics for its performances and faithfulness to the source material. It received praise from Joe Hill. In October 2023, the sequel was officially announced by Universal Pictures with a scheduled release date of June 27, 2025. The following month, it was reported that Hawke, Thames, McGraw, Davies and Mora would reprise their roles in the sequel. Derrickson and Cargill also returned to write the script.

Cargill and Derrickson will also team up to write the script for The Outer Limits, a movie based on the influential 1960s television show of the same name. The film, produced by MGM, will be adapted from a single episode of the classic show, "Demon with a Glass Hand."

== Podcasts ==
Cargill co-hosts the film podcast Junkfood Cinema with critic Brian Salisbury, and the writing advice podcast Write Along with author David Chen.

== Filmography ==
Actor

Year	Title	Role	Notes
2002	The Rules of Attraction	Bus Station Townie	Uncredited
2005	Last Days of America	Breakdown Guy	
2006	Pathogen	Janitor	
2007	When Is Tomorrow	Stephen	
2009	Zombie Girl: The Movie	Himself	

Writer/Producer

Year	Title	Writer	Producer	Notes
2012	Sinister	Yes		
2015	Sinister 2	Yes		
2016	As They Continue to Fall	Yes		
2016	Doctor Strange	Yes		
2019	Into the Dark		Executive	Episode My Valentine
2021	No Man of God	Yes		Credited as "Kit Lesser"
2021	Shadowprowler	Yes	Executive	Short film
2021	The Black Phone	Yes	Yes	
2023	V/H/S/85	Yes		Segment "Dreamkill"
2025	The Gorge		Yes	
2025	Black Phone 2	Yes	Yes	

== Bibliography ==
- Tome of Artifacts by Keith Baker, contributed (April 2007, ISBN 978-1588469359)
- Dreams and Shadows (February 2013, ISBN 0575130091)
- Queen of the Dark Things (May 2014, ISBN 0062190458)
- Sea of Rust (September 2017, ISBN 9780062405838)
- We Are Where the Nightmares Go and Other Stories (Feb 2019, ISBN 9780062405876)
- Day Zero (May 2021, ISBN 9780062405807)
- All the Ash We Leave Behind (Jul 2025, ISBN 9781645242888)
