= Sinister (film) =

2012 horror film by Scott Derrickson

- Theatrical release poster
- Directed by: Scott Derrickson
- Written by: Scott Derrickson; C. Robert Cargill
- Produced by: Jason Blum; Brian Kavanaugh-Jones
- Starring: Ethan Hawke; Juliet Rylance; Fred Thompson; James Ransone; Clare Foley; Michael Hall D'Addario
- Cinematography: Christopher Norr
- Edited by: Frédéric Thoraval
- Music by: Christopher Young
- Production companies: Alliance Films; Blumhouse Productions; Automatik Entertainment; Possessed Pictures
- Distributed by: Summit Entertainment (through Lionsgate Films)
- Release dates: March 11, 2012 (SXSW); October 12, 2012 (United States)
- Running time: 109 minutes
- Countries: United Kingdom; United States; Canada
- Language: English
- Budget: $3 million
- Box office: $87.7 million

Sinister is a 2012 supernatural horror film directed by Scott Derrickson, who co-wrote with C. Robert Cargill. It stars Ethan Hawke as a true-crime writer whose discovery of snuff films depicting gruesome murders and strange supernatural events in his new house puts his family in danger. Juliet Rylance, Fred Thompson, James Ransone, Clare Foley, and Michael Hall D'Addario are featured in supporting roles.

Sinister was inspired by a nightmare Cargill had after watching the 2002 film The Ring. Principal photography on Sinister began in Autumn of 2011 on Long Island, New York with a production budget of $3 million. To add to the authenticity of old home movies and snuff films, the Super 8 found footage segments were shot on actual Super 8 cameras and film stock.

It premiered at the SXSW festival on March 10, 2012. It was released in the United Kingdom on October 5, 2012, and in the United States on October 12. Critics praised its acting, direction, cinematography, and atmosphere, but criticised its use of jump scares and other horror clichés. It was a box office success, grossing $87.7 million against its budget of $3 million. The resulting financial success led to a sequel, released in 2015.

It has since developed a reputation for scariness and is considered a cult classic. A 2020 study by Broadband Choices named Sinister the scariest film ever made, based on an analysis of viewer heart rates.

== Plot ==
Struggling true crime writer Ellison Oswalt fails to replicate the success of his debut book, made famous for helping solve a crime. He and his family move to a home in Chatsford, Pennsylvania, which, unbeknownst to his wife Tracy, is the site where the Stevenson family were killed via hanging. Hoping to revitalize his career, Ellison intends to research the Stevensons' murders and the subsequent disappearance of their youngest child, Stephanie.

In the attic, Ellison finds a box containing a scorpion, a projector, and film reels labeled as home movies. The footage displays families being murdered in various ways, such as drowning and immolation, seemingly perpetrated by the cameraman. Ellison contemplates giving the videos to the police, but ultimately decides to keep them. He notices a cultic symbol and a strange figure in the film, matching one reel to the murder of the Miller family in 1998 and the disappearance of their 13-year-old son Christopher.

While investigating noises in the attic, Ellison finds a king snake and childlike doodles of the killings, which feature a figure called "Mr. Boogie". He falls through the ceiling; emergency services are called, including a deputy who enthusiastically agrees to help Ellison, jokingly accepting the nickname "Deputy So-and-So". Ellison later encounters a Rottweiler in the garden, which flees. So-and-So informs Ellison that the murders took place in different cities at different times, with a child from each family having disappeared. Additionally, he learns that the Stevensons lived in the Millers' former house. Ellison consults occult specialist Professor Jonas about the symbol in the films, which Jonas links to Babylonian god Bughuul, who lures children into his realm and consumes their souls. Jonas suspects the murders are part of a cult initiation rite rather than the work of a single murderer.

Ellison's children, Trevor and Ashley, exhibit erratic behavior as ghost children begin haunting the home, including Ashley painting Stephanie on the walls. Tracy is furious that Ellison moved them into the site of a crime without her knowledge. One night, Bughuul appears to Ellison while he's watching the films. Ellison destroys the camera, projector, and reels, and moves the family back to their old home. Jonas sends Ellison images associated with Bughuul, including the mysterious symbol and a scorpion, snake, and dog. Jonas tells Ellison that early Christians believed Bughuul was summoned through artwork of him, and that he possessed children who see them. Ellison finds the undamaged projector and reels along with a new reel labeled "Extended Cut Endings".

So-and-So tips Ellison to the pattern of families being killed after moving in and fleeing from the previous victims' house. Ellison watches the new footage, which depicts the missing children entering the frame after each murder, revealing that they committed familicide under Bughuul's influence. Ellison passes out, as his coffee was spiked by Ashley. He, Tracy, and Trevor awaken bound and gagged. Ashley states that she will make Ellison famous again before dismembering them with an axe, using their blood to paint Bughuul's face on the walls. She doodles their corpses on the lid of the film reel box as footage of her murders plays on the projector. Bughuul appears and consumes Ashley's soul.

== Cast ==
- Ethan Hawke as Ellison Oswalt
- Juliet Rylance as Tracy Oswalt
- Fred Thompson as the sheriff
- James Ransone as the deputy
- Michael Hall D'Addario as Trevor Oswalt
- Clare Foley as Ashley Oswalt

Additionally, Nicholas King portrays Bughuul. Featured as the missing children are Victoria Leigh as Stephanie, Danielle Kotch as Lana, the lawn girl, Cameron Ocasio as Darren, the BBQ boy, Ethan Haberfield as Tristan, the pool party boy, and Blake Mizrahi as Christopher Miller, the sleepy time boy. Vincent D'Onofrio makes an uncredited appearance as Professor Jonas.

== Production ==
=== Development ===
Writer C. Robert Cargill says that his inspiration for Sinister came from a nightmare he experienced after seeing the 2002 horror film The Ring, in which he discovered a film in his attic depicting the hanging of an entire family. This scenario became the setup for the plot of Sinister. In creating a villain for the film, Cargill conceptualized a new take on the Bogeyman, calling the entity "Mr. Boogie". Cargill's idea was that the creature would be both terrifying and seductive to children, luring them to their dooms as a sinister Willy Wonka-like figure.

Cargill and co-writer Scott Derrickson ultimately decided to downplay the creature's alluring nature, only intimating how it manipulates the children into murder. In further developing Mr. Boogie, the pair had lengthy discussions about its nature, deciding not to make it a demon but rather a Pagan deity, in order to place it outside the conceptual scope of any one particular religion. Consequently, the villain was given the proper name "Bughuul", with only the child characters in the film referring to it as "Mr. Boogie".

=== Design ===
In crafting a look for Bughuul, Cargill initially kept to the idea of a sinister Willy Wonka before realizing that audiences might find it "silly" and kill the potential for the film becoming a series. Looking for inspiration, Derrickson typed the word "horror" into flickr and searched through 500,000 images. He narrowed the images down to 15, including a photograph of a ghoul which was tagged simply "Natalie". Cargill was particularly struck by "Natalie" and decided: "What if it's just this guy?". He and Derrickson contacted the photographer and purchased the rights to use the image for $500. Derrickson explained that the image appealed to him because it reminded him of the makeup and costumes worn by performers in black metal, while remaining unique enough so as not to be directly linked to the genre; Derrickson had previously researched black metal while looking for inspiration for Bughuul's symbol, which is ritualistically painted at the scene of each of the film's murder sequences. Some of the background music for these murder sequences was taken from ambient tracks by bands associated with the Norwegian black metal scene, including Ulver and Aghast.

=== Filming ===
Principal photography for Sinister began in autumn of 2011, after Ethan Hawke and Juliet Rylance signed on to star in the film. The Super 8 found footage segments were shot first, using actual Super 8 cameras and film stock, in order to maintain the aesthetic authenticity of home-shot Super 8 footage. Principal photography took place on Long Island. In an interview with Bleeding Cool, screenwriter Cargill admitted that Hawke's character got his name (Ellison Oswalt) from writer Harlan Ellison and comedian/writer Patton Oswalt. Cargill keeps books by both men on his shelves.

== Reception ==
First revealed at the SXSW festival in the United States, Sinister premiered in the United Kingdom at the London FrightFest and in Spain at the Sitges Film Festival.

=== Critical response ===
Sinister has an approval rating of 64% on Rotten Tomatoes based on 154 reviews, with an average rating of 6.80/10. The critical consensus states "Its plot hinges on typically implausible horror-movie behavior and recycles countless genre cliches, but Sinister delivers a surprising number of fresh, diabolical twists." The film also has a score of 53 out of 100 on Metacritic based on 30 critics, indicating "mixed or average" reviews. Audiences polled by CinemaScore gave the film an average grade of "C+" on an A+ to F scale.

Variety praised the film as "the sort of tale that would paralyze kids' psyches". Film.com stated that Sinister was a "deeply frightening horror film that takes its obligation to alarm very seriously". Roger Ebert gave it three out of four stars, criticizing a few obvious horror tropes but praising Hawke's performance and calling it "an undeniably scary movie." Peter Paras of E! named it the best horror film of 2012, citing the film's soundtrack and subversion of contemporary horror tropes.

CraveOnline called the film "solid" but remarked that the film "doesn't quite go to the next level that gets me like an Insidious", and IGN praised the film's story while criticizing some of Sinister's "scream-out-loud moments" as lazy.

Reviewer Garry McConnachie of Scotland's Daily Record rated the film four of five stars, saying, "This is how Hollywood horror should be done... Sinister covers all its bases with aplomb."

Ryan Lambie of Den of Geek gave the film three out of five stars, and wrote that despite its faults, "there's something undeniably powerful about Sinister. Hawke's performance holds the screen through its more hackneyed moments, and it's the scenes where it's just him, a projector, and a few feet of hideous 8 mm footage where the movie truly convinces. And while its scares are frequently cheap, it's also difficult to deny that Sinister sometimes manages to inspire moments of palpable dread."

Some reviewers have criticized the film's preoccupation with outdated technology. Peter Howell of the Toronto Star (who gave the film two out of four stars) argues that the movie tries for "old school shocks" but "can't afford a pre-Internet setting." Rafer Guzman of Newsday wrote that "celluloid is such a warm, friendly old format that it seems unlikely to contain the spirit of, say, a child-eating demon." Academic study of the film, however, tends to view Sinister's representation of both old and new media formats as a study in transmediation.

A 2020 study conducted by Broadband Choices named Sinister the scariest movie ever made. The study sampled 50 of the highest-rated horror movies ever made based on reception on sites like IMDb, Rotten Tomatoes and Reddit, and then measured study participants' heart rates while watching the sampled films. The average resting heart beat of the study participants was 65 beats per minute (BPM) but jumped to an average 86 BPM while watching the film, an increase of 32% and the highest among all of the sampled films.

=== Home media ===
The film was released on DVD and Blu-ray Disc on February 11, 2013, in the UK and February 19, 2013, in the US with two commentaries (one with director Scott Derrickson and another with writer C. Robert Cargill). The release also included two new features (True Crime Criminals and Living in a House of Death) as well as a featurette on the Sinister Fear Experiment performed by Thrill Laboratory in celebration of the film's theatrical release.

== In popular culture ==
The film is widely referred to and parodied in the comedy A Haunted House 2, with Bughuul/Mr. Boogie being called "Aghoul".

== Sequel ==
A sequel was announced to be in the works in March 2013, with Derrickson in talks to co-write the script with Cargill, but not to direct. On April 17, 2014, it was announced that Ciaran Foy would direct the film, and Brian Kavanaugh-Jones, Charles Layton, Xavier Marchand and Patrice Théroux would executive produce the sequel with eOne Entertainment. The film was released on August 21, 2015.
