= Idiots (2026 film) =

2026 comedy film by Macon Blair

- Theatrical release poster
- Directed by: Macon Blair
- Written by: Macon Blair
- Story by: Macon Blair; Alex Orr
- Produced by: Macon Blair; Dave Franco; Ford Corbett; Mark Fasano; Joshua Harris; Brandon James; Nathan Klingher; Alex Orr
- Starring: Dave Franco; O'Shea Jackson Jr.; Mason Thames; Kiernan Shipka; Nicholas Braun; Peter Dinklage
- Cinematography: Guillermo Garza
- Edited by: Dane McMaster
- Music by: Will Blair; Brooke Blair
- Production companies: Peachtree Media Partners; Gramercy Park Media; WME Independent; Rough House Pictures; Bonneville Pictures
- Distributed by: Independent Film Company
- Release dates: January 23, 2026 (Sundance); August 28, 2026 (United States)
- Running time: 100 minutes
- Country: United States
- Language: English
- Box office: $1.2 million

Idiots is a 2026 American comedy film written, produced, and directed by Macon Blair. The film stars Dave Franco (who also produces the film), O'Shea Jackson Jr., Mason Thames, Kiernan Shipka, Nicholas Braun, and Peter Dinklage.

The film premiered under its original title, The Shitheads, at the 2026 Sundance Film Festival, and was released in the United States on August 28, 2026, by Independent Film Company. The film has received mostly positive reviews from critics.

== Plot ==
Davis Hench is fired from his job at a presbyterian church after taking the congregation's youth group to a screening of Antichrist, and office worker Mark Southard is let go due to budget cuts at his company. Desperate for work, the two consult with a sober transport agency and are paired up to escort teenage Sheridan Kimberly to a rehab clinic. On the way there, Mark assumes Sheridan is being rehabilitated for substance abuse, which Sheridan corroborates, telling elaborate stories about having snorted heroin off of strippers' bodies.

After stopping at a motel, Sheridan finds liquid marijuana and pain killers in Mark's belongings, which he uses to spike the men's drinks. While alone in the room with Mark, Sheridan breaks down in tears and confesses that he feels like a loser, having lied about his previous sexual experience and never even kissed a girl. Pitying him, Mark hires a stripper named Irina. While Irina is performing, Mark defecates and vomits on himself before passing out. Sheridan then attacks Irina before stealing her money. Davis and Mark learn that Sheridan is the son of a wealthy businessman, and that he has gained internet fame and a cult-like following after setting a homeless man on fire. Learning that Sheridan is still at the hotel, they accost him and retrieve Irina's money.

As Mark and Davis continue driving Sheridan to the center, Sheridan posts on social media that he has been kidnapped, divulging Davis' license plate number and promising a five million dollar cash reward for whoever rescues him. Three thugs arrive, taking Davis' car and Sheridan. When they realize he was lying, they kidnap Sheridan for real and call his mother to leave a ransom note. Davis and Mark find the thugs' house, and after some chaos ensues, they are able to escape with Sheridan.

The three arrive at the clinic, where the homeless man Sheridan burned is present. He tries to shoot Sheridan in revenge, and Mark gets shot in the cheek while protecting him. He survives but becomes blind in one eye, earning him eligibility for disability checks. The media hails Davis and Mark as heroes for saving Sheridan, while Davis teams up with Irina to continue transporting jobs.

== Cast ==
- Dave Franco as Mark Southard
- O'Shea Jackson Jr. as Davis Hench
- Mason Thames as Sheridan Kimberley
- Peter Dinklage as Koko
- Kiernan Shipka as Irina Asantas
- Nicholas Braun as Pricka Bush Da Werewoof
- Macon Blair as D.D
- Killer Mike as Pastor William Armstrong
- Jeffrey Wells as Brian

== Production ==
In 2017, it was announced that Macon Blair was writing and directing an original film titled The Shitheads with Luke Wilson and Tracy Morgan set to star. By May 2018, Morgan dropped out and Ron Funches took his place.

In February 2025, it was announced that Dave Franco, O'Shea Jackson Jr., and Peter Dinklage had joined the cast, with Wilson and Funches dropping out. In July of that year, Mason Thames joined the cast. The film is produced by Blair, Franco, Ford Corbett, Mark Fasano, Joshua Harris, Brandon James, Nathan Klingher, and Alex Orr.

Filming locations included areas in Paulding County, Georgia in the fall of 2025.

== Release ==
Idiots premiered at the Sundance Film Festival on January 23, 2026 under its original title The Shitheads. In February 2026, Independent Film Company acquired U.S. distribution rights to the film. In April 2026, the film was retitled to Idiots and gave it a theatrical release in the United States on August 28, 2026.

== Reception ==
On the review aggregator website Rotten Tomatoes, 63% of 76 critics' reviews are positive, with an average rating of 6.1/10. The website's consensus reads: "Crude, rude, and trying just a little too hard to be edgy, Idiots leaves a sour aftertaste but will satisfy those yearning for a pugnacious comedy full of inspired yucks." Metacritic, which uses a weighted average, assigned the film a score of 62 out of 100, based on 18 critics, indicating "generally favorable" reviews.

Writing for RogerEbert.com, critic Brian Tallerico described the film as "a Coen-esque comedy about colossal fuck-ups who end up stuck with a spoiled rich kid who doesn’t believe in consequences [that] gets a bit too messy in the final act, but it’s still a clever flick," and noted that the "script isn’t just consistently funny; it’s also subtly sharp about what it says about class and the truly vile people who are allowed to do whatever they want within it."
