= Ciarán Foy =

Irish film director and screenwriter

- Born: Dublin
- Education: IADT
- Occupations: Film director, screenwriter
- Years active: 2001-present
- Notable work: Sinister 2 Citadel; Eli

Ciarán Foy (born 1979) is an Irish film director and screenwriter, best known for directing and writing Citadel and directing Sinister 2 and Eli.

== Early life ==
Foy was born in Northside Dublin in October 1979 and graduated from the National Film School.

== Career ==
In 2006, Foy directed an award-winning short film The Faeries of Blackheath Woods based on his own script.

In 2012, Foy wrote and directed his feature film debut, an Irish psychological horror Citadel, starring Aneurin Barnard in the lead role. The film premiered at the South by Southwest festival on 11 March 2012 and won several awards.

Foy next directed the supernatural horror film Sinister 2 for Blumhouse Productions, starring James Ransone and Shannyn Sossamon. The film was written by Scott Derrickson and C. Robert Cargill, and was released on 21 August 2015 by Focus Features' label Gramercy Pictures. Derrickson secured Foy the directing job of the film after watching Citadel.

Foy directed a number of commercials for clients such as Samsung and Bord Failte. He won a YDA Award at Cannes, a D&AD nomination and a Kinsale Shark Award for his PlayStation spot "Our Shoes". In 2019 Foy directed the Netflix horror Eli and soon after directed two episodes of The Haunting Of Bly Manor.

In 2020 Foy and co‑writer Kyle Ward originated a pitch to adapt American Reaper, a graphic novel by Pat Mills and artist Clint Langley (originally in Judge Dredd Megazine), into a feature film. The project was optioned by Amblin Partners with Intrepid Pictures producing.

In 2022 and 2023 Foy directed three episodes of the Netflix show Sweet Tooth.

== Filmography ==
Feature films

Year	Title	Director	Writer
2012	Citadel	Yes	Yes
2015	Sinister 2	Yes	No
2019	Eli	Yes	No

Short films

Year	Title	Director	Writer	Editor	Notes
2001	1902	Yes	Yes	Yes	Also producer
2001	Wired 03:36	Yes	Yes	Yes	Also producer
2002	The Puppet	Yes	Yes	Yes	
2006	The Faeries of Blackheath Woods	Yes	Yes	Yes	
2007	Scumbot	Yes	Yes	Yes	
2009	The Chronoscope	No	No	Yes	
2009	Lonely Hearts	Yes	Yes	No	Segment of Hotel Darklight
2015	Mikayla W.M.D.	Yes	Yes	No	Unreleased

Television

Year	Title	Director	Notes
2016	The Wilding	Yes	Unaired pilot
2020	The Haunting of Bly Manor	Yes	2 episodes
2023-24	Sweet Tooth	Yes	3 episodes
