= Citadel (film) =

2012 film by Ciaran Foy

- Theatrical release poster
- Directed by: Ciarán Foy
- Written by: Ciarán Foy
- Produced by: Katie Holly; Brian Coffey
- Starring: Aneurin Barnard; James Cosmo; Jake Wilson; Wunmi Mosaku
- Cinematography: Tim Fleming
- Edited by: Tony Kearns; Jake Roberts
- Music by: tomandandy
- Production companies: Blinder Films; Citadel Films
- Release date: 11 March 2012 (South by Southwest Film Festival)
- Running time: 84 minutes
- Country: Ireland
- Language: English

Citadel is a 2012 Irish psychological horror film written and directed by Ciarán Foy, in his feature film debut. It was filmed in Glasgow, Scotland. The film stars Aneurin Barnard as Tommy, a widower who must raise his baby alone after an attack by a gang leaves his wife dead and him suffering from agoraphobia. It is an example of "hoodie horror".

== Plot ==
Tommy and his pregnant wife Joanne are moving out of their flat in a condemned tower block. But when Tommy is in the lift, Joanne is cornered by a group of young teenagers, all wearing hoodies. Tommy watches helplessly from the lift as the gang attack his wife, but the lift door won't open. When he finally gets to Joanne, he finds her beaten, with a syringe in her stomach. She is rushed to hospital, where doctors save her baby, but Joanne is left in a comatose condition.

Eight months later, Tommy is living in a run-down council estate, which is a little better than the tower block he vacated, and caring for his baby daughter Elsa. As a result of the attack on his wife, he has agoraphobia and is terrified when he has to leave his house. He visits Joanne at the hospice where she is being cared for, but is told there is no hope of her recovery. Tommy consents to have his wife taken off life support. Grief-stricken, he is consoled by a friendly nurse, Marie.

At Joanne's funeral, Tommy meets a foul-mouthed and eccentric priest who warns him that the gang of feral teenagers will be back for his daughter. The priest is in the charge of a young boy, Danny, who is blind but - strangely - appears to be able to "see" Tommy.

Everyone is gradually being evicted from the estate where Tommy lives, as the area is being redeveloped. Tommy is one of the last tenants left. That night, the hoodies break into his house and ransack the place, apparently looking for Elsa. Tommy calls Marie, but the call is disconnected before he can explain the situation. He spends the rest of the night barricaded in the bathroom with the baby, where Marie finds him the next morning.

Marie lets Tommy and Elsa stay with her for a few days. Trying to calm him down, Marie disputes that the same gang were looking to kidnap his daughter, instead suggesting that he's simply the victim of two random, violent attacks by different groups of teenagers. Unconvinced, Tommy demands to see the priest again, and Marie offers to help.

The priest tells Tommy that he wants to destroy the tower block, which he says has become a nesting place for creatures that are no longer human. He tells Tommy of an urban myth: a young pregnant woman, a junkie, gave birth to twins in the building. The children grew up alone, and eventually had an incestuous relationship, which resulted in the birth of a mutant breed, blind and feral, who "see" people by sensing their fear. They kidnap children and turn them into creatures like themselves. Danny was such a child, but the priest rescued him before he was fully transformed. Danny, although blind, can sense fear and protect others from being detected by the ferals.

Overwhelmed, Tommy refuses to help the priest and returns to Marie's apartment. Marie doesn't believe the story either, and she expresses empathy toward the youths, saying that they need someone to care about them. The next day, Marie accompanies Tommy and the baby to the bus depot, where he can catch a bus to his new council accommodation. Their route takes them through a long, badly lit underpass. Seeing a group of hoodies ahead, Tommy is frozen with fear and refuses to go further, but Marie says she will prove to him there is nothing to be afraid of, and approaches the teenagers. Tommy watches in horror as they attack and kill her.

Tommy flees with the baby, but the ferals give chase. He manages to board a bus, but when the bus stops further down the road, hoodies swarm on board, attack the driver and another passenger, and then beat Tommy and take Elsa.

Desperate to save Elsa, Tommy demands help from the priest. Reluctantly, the priest agrees to help him, but only if Tommy will help blow up the abandoned tower block. They go there with Danny, who uses his ability to prevent the ferals from sensing their presence, and proceed to wire the building with home-made explosives, but Tommy separates from the others when he hears a baby crying. It turns out to be a trap, and ferals descend upon them, but the priest sacrifices himself to save Tommy and Danny. Before he dies, the priest reveals himself as the father of the original infected kids. Tommy and Danny make their way to the basement, where they find Elsa, who is safe and well. But sadly there are other "turned" children in cages, now beyond help.

When Tommy, Danny and Elsa head for the exit, they see their way is blocked by the ferals. Danny, scared, reveals that he never had the power to protect anyone, but Tommy - who has overcome his fear - is able to navigate their way through the group, who do not sense their presence.

Outside, Tommy watches from afar as explosions go off, destroying the building and its mutant inhabitants.

== Cast ==
- Aneurin Barnard as Tommy
- James Cosmo as Priest
- Jake Wilson as Danny
- Wunmi Mosaku as Marie
- Harry Saunders as Elsa
- Amy Shiels as Joanne

== Production ==
Writer/director Ciarán Foy based the film on his own experiences, including an attack by youths in hoodies, who threatened him with a dirty syringe. The youths did not steal anything from him, leaving him confused as to their motivation. Foy was left agoraphobic by the experience, using the film as a method of catharsis.

Foy was influenced by Stanley Kubrick, David Cronenberg, Adrian Lyne, and Chris Cunningham.

Production took five years to get off the ground. Shooting took place in Glasgow, Scotland.

== Reception ==
Rotten Tomatoes gives the film a score of 56% based on reviews from 45 critics, with an average rating of 5.64/10. On Metacritic it has a 60 out 100, based on 14 reviews, indicating "mixed or average reviews".

In a mixed review, Jeannette Catsoulis of The New York Times said the film "occasionally veers into ludicrousness" and has an "atavistic pulse". In a negative review, John DeFore of The Hollywood Reporter cited the overtones of class warfare and poor timing, given the killing of Trayvon Martin.

In a more positive review, Roger Ebert rated the film 3 out of 4 stars, citing young people in hoodies as being inherently scary. In another positive review, Noel Murray of The A.V. Club compared it to Roman Polanski's Repulsion, calling Citadel "a bare-bones man-against-his-worst-fears white knuckler, shot through deep, menacing shadows." Joe Leydon of Variety wrote: "Writer-director Ciaran Foy skillfully taps into primal fears and urban paranoia to keep his audience consistently unsettled in Citadel, an intensely suspenseful horror-thriller."
