= Sinister 2 =

2015 film by Ciarán Foy

- Theatrical release poster
- Directed by: Ciarán Foy
- Written by: Scott Derrickson; C. Robert Cargill
- Based on: Characters by: Scott Derrickson; C. Robert Cargill
- Produced by: Jason Blum; Scott Derrickson
- Starring: James Ransone; Shannyn Sossamon
- Cinematography: Amy Vincent
- Edited by: Michael Trent; Tim Alverson
- Music by: tomandandy
- Production companies: Entertainment One; Blumhouse Productions; Steady Aim
- Distributed by: Gramercy Pictures (United States); Entertainment One (Canada)
- Release date: August 21, 2015
- Running time: 97 minutes
- Countries: United States; Canada
- Language: English
- Budget: $10 million
- Box office: $54.1 million

Sinister 2 (stylized in marketing as Sinister II) is a 2015 supernatural horror film directed by Ciarán Foy, and written by Scott Derrickson and C. Robert Cargill. A sequel to Sinister (2012), it stars James Ransone, reprising his role from the original film, and Shannyn Sossamon. The film follows a former deputy as he attempts to put an end to a malevolent deity's curse after an encounter with a family that fell victim to it, while a boy is tormented by the victims who lived in the house where he, his twin brother, and mother now reside. Unlike the first film, which utilized 8 mm film in the story's home movies and snuff films, Sinister 2 utilized 16 mm film, vinyl records, and ham radio broadcasts in the film's storyline.

Sinister 2 was released on August 21, 2015. The film received negative reviews from critics, with criticism for its jump scares, horror clichés and story, while Ransone's performance received some praise. It grossed over $54 million against its reported budget of $10 million.

== Plot ==
Dylan Collins awakens from a nightmare in which a family of three are killed in a cornfield. Dylan, his twin brother, Zach, and their mother, Courtney, squat in a farmhouse after running away from Courtney's abusive husband, Clint. In addition to having nightmares of families being murdered, Dylan is visited by ghostly children who coerce him into watching films of the children murdering their families.

Former sheriff's deputy "So-and-so", now a private investigator, investigates the murders connected to Bughuul. He arrives at the farmhouse and finds the Collins family. He tells Courtney that he is there to investigate the church where a murder took place. So-and-so drives away Clint, who tries to take the boys, and convinces Courtney to stay at the farmhouse, knowing that leaving will continue Bughuul's murders. Courtney invites him to spend the night.

So-and-so meets with Professor Stromberg, the owner of a ham radio that belonged to Professor Jonas, who mysteriously disappeared. Stromberg tells So-and-so that the radio belonged to a Norwegian family that was murdered in 1973. He tells So-and-so that Bughuul is invited through ritual sacrifice, with three common traits present: a murdered family, missing children, and artwork of Bughuul. After the radio suddenly activates, the Deputy orders Stromberg to destroy it.

Zach acts violently toward Dylan, jealous of the ghost children's attentiveness to him. However, the children turn their attention toward him after Dylan refuses to watch another family being murdered, stating that Dylan is not their real target. Clint arrives with a court order and takes Courtney and the boys home. So-and-so arrives at their house to warn them about Bughuul, but Clint beats him. The next day, Zach films his family relaxing outdoors and spikes their drinks. That night, Dylan contacts the Deputy for help as he and his parents lose consciousness.

Courtney, Dylan, and Clint are hung on scarecrow posts with sacks over their heads, mirroring Dylan's nightmare. Zach douses them in gasoline, filming Clint burning to death. Before Zach can set Dylan on fire, So-and-so hits Zach with his car. He frees Courtney and Dylan, and they flee. Zach pursues and catches So-and-so, amputating a few of his fingers with a sickle. Inside the home, the ghost children help Zach locate Courtney and Dylan. Before he can kill them, So-and-so destroys the camera, making it impossible for Zach to complete the ritual. Zach frantically looks for another camera in the film trunk, but finds none. A disappointed Bughuul appears and kills Zach with a deathly touch as punishment for failing. Zach's body decays and bursts into flames, setting the house on fire. So-and-so, Dylan, and Courtney escape the house and watch it burn.

Later, while collecting his things to leave with Courtney and Dylan, the Deputy finds the ham radio in his motel room. The ghost children begin speaking to him through it before Bughuul suddenly appears.

== Cast ==
- James Ransone as Ex-Deputy So-and-So
- Shannyn Sossamon as Courtney Wheeler-Collins
- Robert Daniel Sloan as Dylan Collins
- Dartanian Sloan as Zachary "Zach" Collins
- Lea Coco as Clint Collins
- Tate Ellington as Dr. Stromberg
- John Beasley as Father Rodriguez
- Lucas Jade Zumann as Milo Jacobs / Sunday Service Boy
- Jaden Klein as Ted / Fishing Trip Boy
- Laila Haley as Emma / Christmas Morning Girl
- Caden M. Fritz as Peter / Kitchen Remodel Boy
- Olivia Rainey as Catherine / Trip To The Dentist Girl
- Nicholas King as Bughuul / "Mr. Boogie"
- Robert Finlayson as Milo's Father / Reverend Jacobs

== Production ==
=== Development ===
A sequel to Sinister (2012) was announced to be in the works in March 2013, with writers Scott Derrickson and C. Robert Cargill returning, but the former not directing as he did on the first film.

In April 2014, it was announced that Ciarán Foy would direct the film, and Brian Kavanaugh-Jones, Charles Layton, Xavier Marchand, and Patrice Théroux would executive produce the sequel with Entertainment One.

=== Filming ===
Principal photography began on August 19, 2014, in Chicago. It was shot for six weeks in locations including St. Anne and outside the village of Grant Park.

=== Post-production ===
On May 20, 2015, Focus Features relaunched their Gramercy Pictures label for action, horror, and science-fiction films. Sinister 2 was one of Gramercy's new releases.

== Release ==
Sinister 2 released theatrically in the United States on August 21, 2015, and was distributed by Focus Features.

=== Home media ===
Sinister 2 was released on DVD and Blu-ray on January 12, 2016.

== Reception ==
=== Box office ===
The movie grossed $27,740,955 domestically and $26,363,270 internationally for a total of $53,329,150.

It was a lower gross than its predecessor, which finished its theatrical run with $82,515,113, though still well above its reported $10 million production budget.

=== Critical response ===
Rotten Tomatoes gave the film an approval rating of 14%, based on 91 reviews with an average rating of 4/10. The site's critical consensus reads, "Sinister 2 has a few ingredients that will be familiar to fans of the original; unfortunately, in this slapdash second installment, none of them are scary anymore." Metacritic gives the film a score of 32 out of 100, based on reviews from 17 critics, indicating "generally unfavorable reviews". Audiences polled by CinemaScore gave the film an average grade of "B−" on an A+ to F scale.

IGN awarded it a score of 1 out of 10, rating it "unbearable". The site says, "Sinister 2 is an abysmal follow-up to its predecessor. At least that film knew that less is more. And less is scarier." MoviePilot also awarded the film 1 out of 10, calling it "one of the worst horror films of the last few years."

== Future ==
=== Potential crossover ===
Prior to the release of Insidious: The Last Key, Jason Blum stated that a crossover film between Sinister and the Insidious series had previously been in development, and that he personally believed it had potential for re-entering it, stating that "we're going to cross our worlds at some point".

=== Potential sequel ===
In October 2023, Scott Derrickson stated that he has interest in returning to the Sinister franchise. While the filmmaker said he believed that Sinister 2 had not taken the right approach, he stated that he believes there are various ways that a sequel could be developed moving forward.
