= Bloomin Mud Shuffle =

- Film poster
- Directed by: Frank V. Ross
- Written by: Frank V. Ross
- Produced by: Joe Swanberg; Jacqueline E. Ingram
- Starring: James Ransone; Natasha Lyonne; Sean Bradley; Tim Baker; Tim Baltz; Alexia Rasmussen
- Cinematography: Mike Gibisser
- Edited by: Frank V. Ross
- Music by: Josh Medeski
- Release date: April 10, 2015 (Wisconsin Film Festival)
- Running time: 75 minutes
- Country: United States
- Language: English

Bloomin Mud Shuffle is an American independent comedy film written and directed by Frank V. Ross. The film stars James Ransone, Natasha Lyonne, Sean Bradley, Tim Baker, and Tim Baltz. The film had its world premiere at the Wisconsin Film Festival on April 10, 2015.

== Premise ==
Lonnie's life hasn't changed much since he's graduated high school. He still drinks way too much, he still even paints houses, and still hangs out with his old friends from high school.

== Cast ==
- James Ransone as Lonnie
- Alexia Rasmussen as Monica
- Natasha Lyonne as Jock
- Alex Karpovsky as Chuck
- Joe Swanberg as Brock
- Sean Bradley as Mike
- Tim Baker as Ernie
- Tim Baltz as Bobby

== Release ==
The film had its world premiere at the Wisconsin Film Festival on April 10, 2015. The film went on to screen at Rooftop Films on July 10, 2015. The film is scheduled to screen at the Sidewalk Film Festival on August 30, 2015.
