= 20th Century Ghosts =

2005 short story collection by Joe Hill

- Cover art for the U.K. edition
- Author: Joe Hill
- Cover artist: Vincent Chong
- Genre: Horror
- Published: 2005 (PS Publishing)
- Publication place: United Kingdom
- Media type: Limited edition hardcover
- Pages: xiv, 304 p.
- ISBN: 1-904619-47-9
- OCLC: 60668592
- Followed by: Heart-Shaped Box

20th Century Ghosts is a collection of short stories by American author Joe Hill. It is Hill's first published book-length work. It was first published in October 2005 in the United Kingdom and released in October 2007 in the United States.

== Publication history ==
20th Century Ghosts is the first publication made by American author Joe Hill in October 2005 by PS Publishing which is based in the United Kingdom. The original release was available for pre-sale only through the publisher's website.

The collection has won several awards including the Bram Stoker Award for Best Fiction Collection, as well as the British Fantasy Award for Best Collection and Best Short Story for "Best New Horror." The hardcover editions are collectable, especially the signed slipcased edition that had a print run of 200 copies.

In October 2007, HarperCollins released the first public edition of Hill's collection. This edition also contains the short story "Bobby Conroy Comes Back from the Dead," which was not previously published in the UK edition.

In December 2021, the collection was re-published under the title The Black Phone, as a lead-in for the motion picture based on that story in June 2022.

=== Limited editions ===
Released in October 2005, this short story collection was released in a limited edition format only. The three formats available before publication were:

- Deluxe slipcased signed limited hardcover edition signed by Hill and Christopher Golden (introduction author) and numbered 1-200 (ISBN 1-904619-48-7)
- Signed limited edition hardcover signed by Hill and numbered 1-500 (ISBN 1-904619-47-9)
- Trade paperback unsigned at 1,000 copies printed (ISBN 1-904619-46-0)

== Contents ==
Title	Originally published in...	Available in...
Introduction (by Christopher Golden)	N/A	All editions
"Best New Horror"	Postscripts no. 3 (2005)	All editions
"20th Century Ghost"	The High Plains Literary Review final issue (2002)	All editions
"Pop Art"	With Signs & Wonders (2001)	All editions
"You Will Hear the Locust Sing"	The Third Alternative no. 37 (2004)	All editions
"Abraham's Boys"	The Many Faces of Van Helsing (2004)	All editions
"Better Than Home"	Better Than Home (chapbook, 1999)	All editions
"The Black Phone"	The Third Alternative no. 39 (2004)	All editions
"In the Rundown"	Crimewave no. 8 (2005)	All editions
"The Cape"	Previously unpublished	All editions
"Last Breath"	Subterranean Magazine no. 2 (2005)	All editions
"Dead-Wood"	Subterranean Press February online newsletter (2005)	All editions
"The Widow's Breakfast"	The Clackamas Literary Review spring/summer issue (2002)	All editions
"My Father's Mask"	Previously unpublished	All editions
"Voluntary Committal"	Voluntary Committal (chapbook, 2005)	All editions
"Bobby Conroy Comes Back from the Dead"	Postscripts no. 5 (2005)	U.S. print and audio book editions
"The Saved"	The Clackamas Literary Review spring/summer issue (2001)	U.K. slipcased edition
"The Black Phone: The Missing Chapter"	Previously unpublished	U.K. slipcased edition
Story Notes (by the author)	N/A	U.K. slipcased edition
"Scheherazade's Typewriter"	Previously unpublished	All editions ("hidden" in the Acknowledgements)

=== Best New Horror ===
Eddie Carroll is the editor of an annual anthology entitled America's Best New Horror. As part of his job he has read and rejected many thousands of derivative stories, and he has become jaded by the process. When he reads the strangely disturbing story "Buttonboy" by Peter Kilrue, he regains his passion for his work. The plot concerns his search for the elusive Kilrue in an attempt to procure "Buttonboy" for the anthology.

=== 20th Century Ghost ===
The Rosebud Theatre is an old style movie palace, haunted by the semi-legendary spirit of a young woman. The girl died during a screening of The Wizard of Oz, appears infrequently throughout the twentieth century, and occasionally starts conversations with a select few moviegoers. The story is told by Alec Sheldon, the theatre owner, who worries about his approaching mortality and what will happen to the Rosebud after he retires.

=== Pop Art ===
This story was originally published in 2001 in an anthology titled With Signs & Wonders by Invisible Cities Press. In 2007, Subterranean Press produced a limited edition chapbook of "Pop Art" limited to 150 numbered copies and 52 lettered copies. These books were only available through the publishers website.

The plot concerns the friendship of two socially outcast boys: the narrator, who has a dysfunctional home life, and his only friend, a human boy made of inflatable plastic who has loving and supportive flesh-and-blood parents. Christopher Golden called it one of the best short stories in years.

=== You Will Hear the Locust Sing ===
The story of a boy who wakes up one morning to find that he has become a giant, human-sized insect.

=== Abraham's Boys ===
Abraham Van Helsing, living in America following the events of Dracula, tries to teach his sons about vampires.

=== Better Than Home ===
Story about a troubled boy whose father manages a baseball team.

=== The Black Phone ===
13-year-old Finney is kidnapped by a man named the Grabber. Trapped in a basement room, the boy's only hope may lie in a mysterious disconnected black phone hanging on the basement wall. The phone rings at night with the whispers of the kidnapper's previous (and now dead) victims. In 2021, this short story was adapted into a film of the same title by Scott Derrickson, with Ethan Hawke as the Grabber and Mason Thames as Finney. The film received a sequel in 2025 written and directed by Derrickson, based on an original idea by Joe Hill.

=== In The Rundown ===
A video store clerk comes upon a grisly scene on a weedy dirt lane.

=== The Cape ===
Seven-year-old Eric learns that he can fly (well, sort of) while wearing his blue cape. After suffering a terrible injury he thinks the cape is lost, only to find the cape again years later.

=== Last Breath ===
The story concerns Dr. Allinger, an old man who runs a "Museum of Silence" which contains the last breaths of various people, some being famous figures such as Edgar Allan Poe.

=== The Widow's Breakfast ===
During the Great Depression, a drifter encounters a widow whose offer of food and fresh clothing may be too good to be true.

=== Bobby Conroy Comes Back from The Dead ===
A failed comedian meets his now-married ex-girlfriend during the filming of Dawn of the Dead.

=== My Father's Mask ===
Thirteen-year-old Jack's parents take him on an unexpected trip to their cabin on Big Cat Lake. Along the way they play a game made up by Jack's mother in which they are being chased by the "playing card people". At the cabin Jack finds various masks, which he is told must be worn to disguise themselves from the playing card people. Jack grows weary of the game, but soon he finds that it may not be a game at all.

== Adaptations ==
- Pop Art (2008), short film directed by Amanda Boyle, based on the short story "Pop Art"
- Abraham's Boys (2009), short film directed by Dorothy Street, based on the short story "Abraham's Boys"
- The Black Phone (2021), film directed by Scott Derrickson, based on the short story "The Black Phone"
- Abraham's Boys (2025), film directed by Natasha Kermani, based on the short story "Abraham's Boys"
