= Madeleine McGraw =

American actress (born 2008)

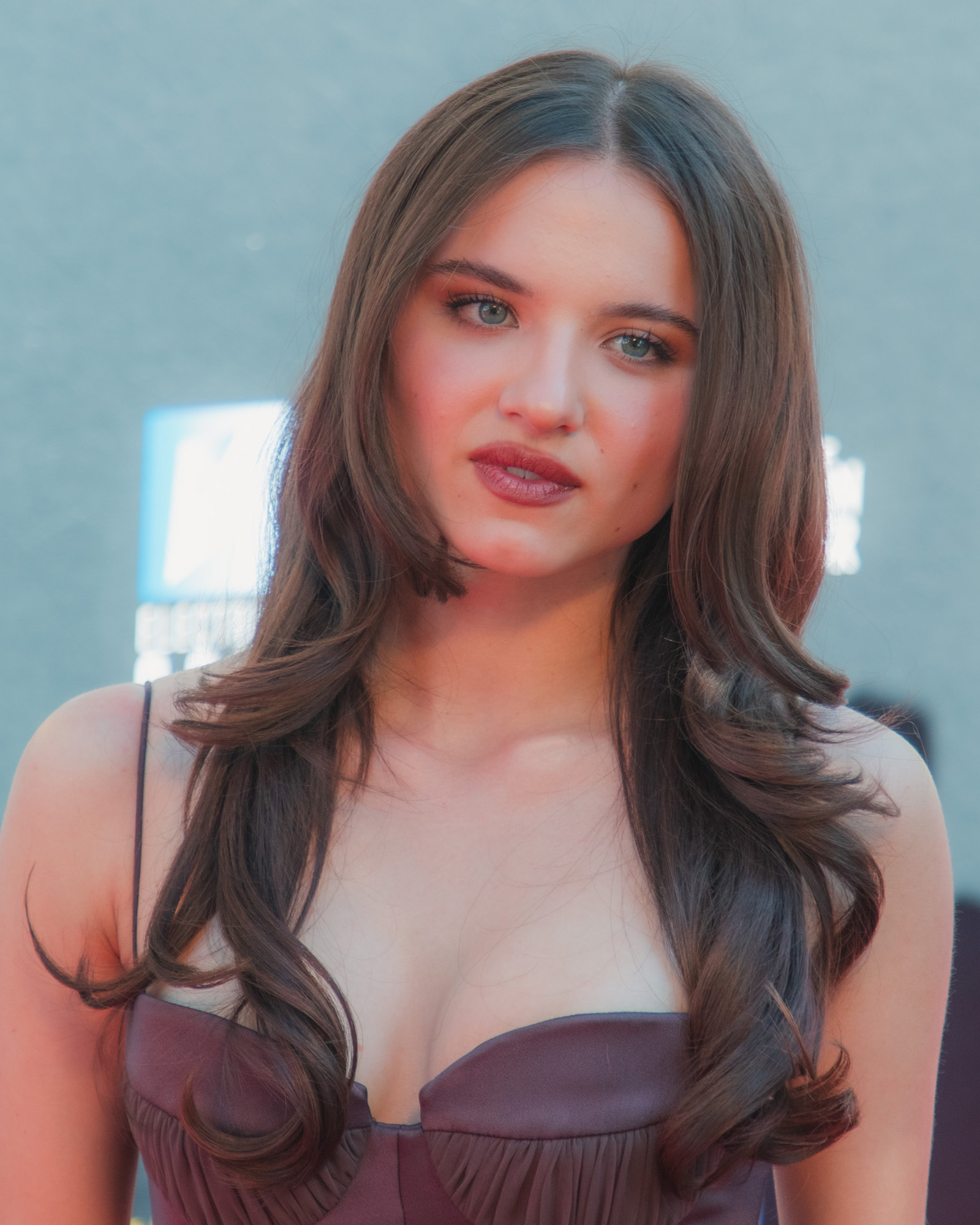
- McGraw in 2026
- Born: December 22, 2008 (age 17)
- Occupation: Actress
- Years active: 2014–present
- Relatives: Violet McGraw (sister)

Madeleine McGraw (born December 22, 2008) is an American actress. She started her career as a child actress, gaining recognition for her roles in various horror-themed projects including the television show Outcast (2016–2018), and the films The Mandela Effect (2019), The Black Phone (2021) and Black Phone 2 (2025). She has been referred to as a scream queen and earned two Saturn Award nominations for Best Performance by a Younger Actor. (Note: For her role as Gwen Blake in both The Black Phone and Black Phone 2.)

She also starred as Zoey Campbell in the Disney Channel series Secrets of Sulphur Springs (2021–2023) and has portrayed a younger version of Hope van Dyne in the Marvel Cinematic Universe (MCU) film Ant-Man and the Wasp (2018) and the Disney+ series What If...? (2023).

== Career ==
McGraw made her film debut as a child actress in the film American Sniper (2014) and other various short films, alongside her twin brother Aidan McGraw. After appearing in various television shows, she starred in the horror drama show Outcast (2016–2018). From a recurring role in the first season, McGraw was promoted to series regular for the second season.

McGraw went on to appear as child versions of characters in several films including: Ant-Man and the Wasp (2018) as a young Hope van Dyne played by Evangeline Lilly, Pacific Rim Uprising (2018) as a young Amara Namani played by Cailee Spaeny, and The Mitchells vs. the Machines (2021) as a young Katie Mitchell played by Abbi Jacobson. During this time, she also voiced various characters in Pixar films, including Maddy McGear in Cars 3 (2017) and Bonnie in Toy Story 4 (2019). She also appeared in The Mandela Effect (2019). McGraw appeared as a series regular in the Disney Channel show Secrets of Sulphur Springs (2021–2023). The show was later cancelled in January 2024 after three seasons.

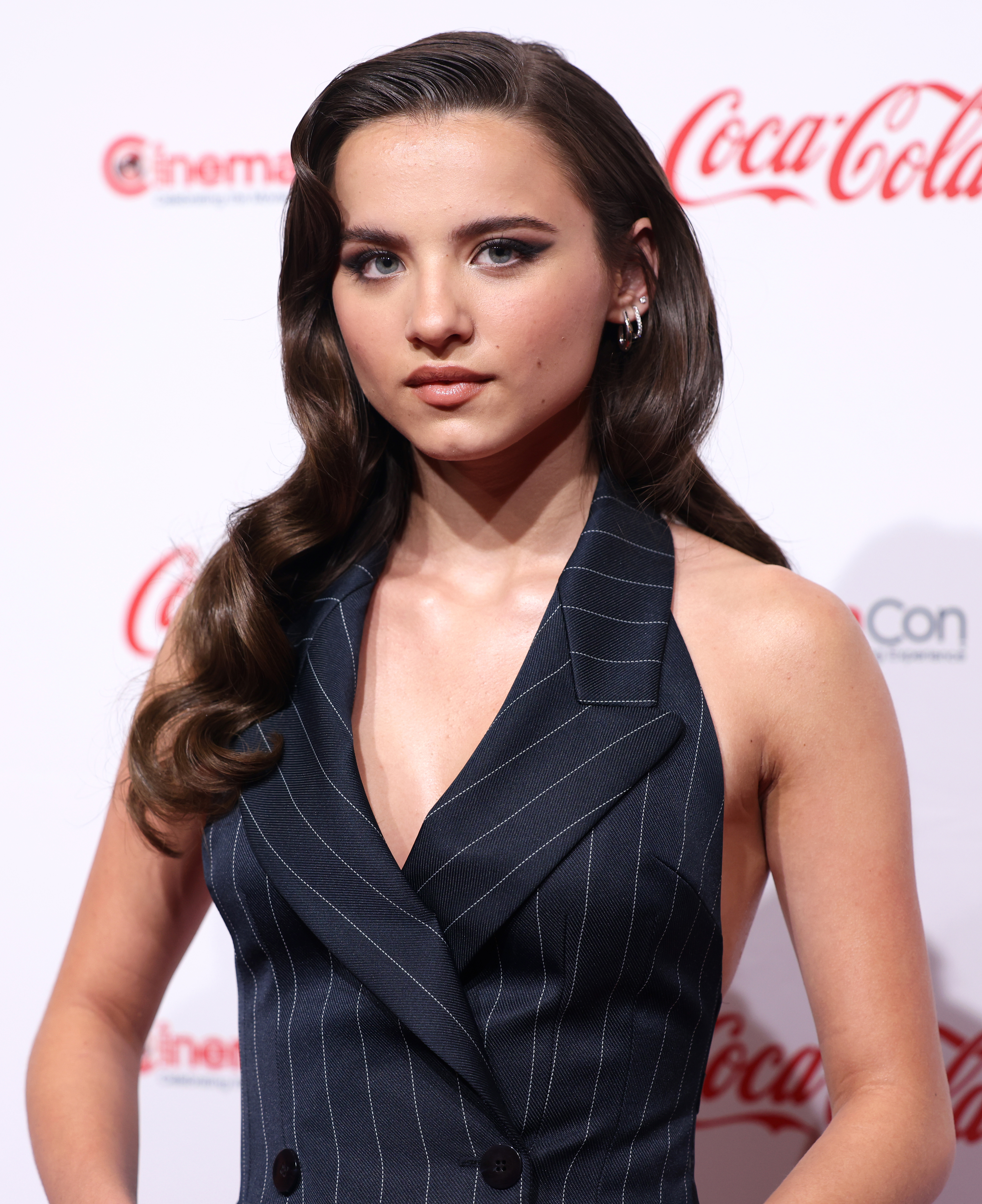
McGraw at the 2025 CinemaCon

In September 2021, McGraw starred as Gwen Blake in the supernatural horror film The Black Phone (2021), directed by Scott Derrickson. The film received critical acclaim and earned McGraw various awards and nomination including that for the Saturn Award for Best Performance by a Younger Actor. In 2022, McGraw went on to as the titular character in the horror film The Curse of Rosalie (2022) (originally titled The Harbinger), filmed a few years prior. While the film was panned by critics, her acting and role received praise. A year later she appeared in the horror film Robbie Ain't Right No More (2023) which debuted at the Tribeca Film Festival. McGraw reprised her role as a young Van Dyne in the second season of the Disney+ animated series What If...? (2023). She also starred in The Curse of the Necklace (2024), alongside her sister Violet.

In April 2025, McGraw was honoured as the "Rising Star" of 2025 at CinemaCon. At the end of June, she starred in Captain Tsunami which made its premiere at the Dances With Films film festival. In October she reprised her role of Gwen Blake in Black Phone 2. For her role she was nominated for Best Young Performer at the 9th Astra Film Awards where she was also honored as the "Star on the Rise".

On October 9, 2026, McGraw is set to star, alongside her sister Violet, in a holiday-themed film titled Double Trouble (initially titled High Stakes Holiday) with both sisters and their mom producing.

== Public image ==
After her performances in various films within the horror genre including The Black Phone, McGraw has often been referred to as a scream queen in the media. (Note: Attributed to various sources including People, Blunt Magazine, and Collider.) In response to the title, McGraw stated that she is "very flattered", adding that she "never thought that this would be the direction that my career would be going, because my parents would literally never let us watch horror movies when we were younger".

== Personal life ==
Madeleine McGraw is one of four children. Her siblings are all also actors including her twin brother, Aidan McGraw who starred alongside her in American Sniper, Jack McGraw portraying young Arlo in The Good Dinosaur and starring alongside her in Toy Story 4, and Violet McGraw who portrayed young Yelena Belova in Black Widow.

== Filmography ==
=== Film ===
Year	Title	Role	Notes	Ref.
2014	American Sniper	McKenna		
2017	Cars 3	Maddy McGear	Voice	
2018	Ant-Man and the Wasp	Young Hope van Dyne		
2018	Pacific Rim Uprising	Young Amara Namani		
2019	Toy Story 4	Bonnie Anderson	Voice; succeeding Emily Hahn from Toy Story 3	
2019	The Mandela Effect	Sam		
2021	The Black Phone	Gwendolyn "Gwen" Blake		
2021	The Mitchells vs. the Machines	Young Katie Mitchell	Voice	
2022	The Harbinger	Rosalie Snyder		
2023	Robbie Ain't Right No More	Sarah	Short film	
2024	The Curse of the Necklace	Judith Davis		
2025	Captain Tsunami	Emma		
2025	Black Phone 2	Gwendolyn "Gwen" Blake		
2026	Double Trouble	Charlotte	also executive producer	
TBA	Bad Influence †	Isabelle	Post-production	

=== Television ===
Year	Title	Role	Notes	Ref.
2014	Bones	Molly Blake	Episode: "The Drama in the Queen"	
2014	Selfie	Little Girl	Episode: "Here's This Guy"	
2016	Clarence	Rita	3 episodes	
2016–2017	Outcast	Amber Barnes	14 episodes (recurring season 1; main season 2)	
2018	Reverie	Brynn	3 episodes	
2018	Criminal Minds	Naomi Shaw	Episode: "Ashley"	
2019	A Christmas Wish	Stella	Lifetime television-film	
2021–2023	Secrets of Sulphur Springs	Zoey Campbell	Main role	
2023	What If...?	Hope van Dyne	Voice; Episode: "What If... Peter Quill Attacked Earth's Mightiest Heroes?"	

=== Music videos ===
Year	Title	Role	Artist	Ref.
2017	"Do Re Mi"	Herself	Blackbear & Gucci Mane	
2025	"Coincidence"	Herself	Maddox Batson	

== Awards and nominations ==
Award	Year (Note: Indicates the year of ceremony. Each year is linked to the article about the awards held that year, wherever possible.)	Category	Work	Result	Ref.
Astra Film Awards	2026	Best Young Performer	Black Phone 2	Nominated	
Astra Film Awards	2026	Star on the Rise	Herself	Honoree	
CinemaCon Big Screen Achievement Awards	2025	Rising Star	Herself	Honoree	
Fangoria Chainsaw Awards	2023	Best Supporting Performance	The Black Phone	Won	
Saturn Awards	2022	Best Younger Performer in a Film	The Black Phone	Nominated	
Saturn Awards	2026	Best Younger Performer in a Film	Black Phone 2	Nominated	
San Diego Film Critics Society	2023	Best Youth Performance	The Black Phone	Nominated	
Young Artist Award	2015	Best Performance in a Feature Film – Supporting Young Actress	American Sniper	Nominated	
