= Mason Thames =

American actor (born 2007)

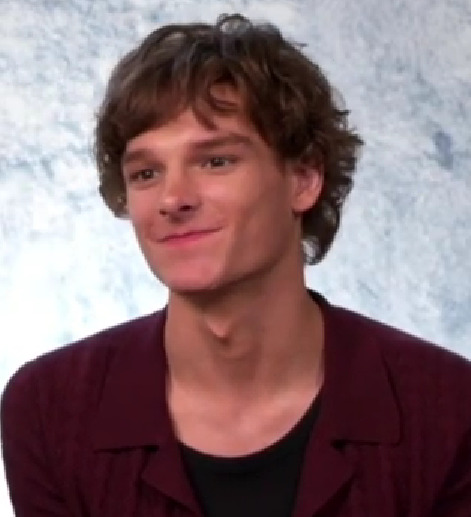
- Thames in 2025
- Born: July 10, 2007 (age 19); Dallas, Texas, U.S.
- Occupation: Actor
- Years active: 2017–present

Mason Thames (/θeɪmz/ THAYMZ; born July 10, 2007) is an American actor. He made his acting debut in 2017 and gained recognition for his performance in the lead role of Finney Blake in the horror film The Black Phone (2021), a breakthrough role he reprised in its 2025 sequel. In 2025, he received increased attention for his portrayal of Hiccup in the live-action fantasy How to Train Your Dragon – for which he received a nomination for a Saturn Award – and for his romantic lead role in Regretting You.

== Early life ==
Thames was born on July 10, 2007, in Dallas, Texas. He was raised in McKinney and attended school in Prosper.

== Career ==
Thames made his acting debut in the 2017 short film After Omelas as Liam. He was featured in three episodes of the first season of the Apple TV+ series For All Mankind in 2019. Thames played the lead role in Scott Derrickson's horror film The Black Phone (2021). The role garnered him widespread acclaim.

On casting Thames over hundreds of other applicants, Derrickson stated that "he has a gift that very few actors, even adult professional actors, have, which is the ability to truthfully and emotionally process every moment, one shot at a time, without overacting. It's in his eyes and in his countenance, and his ability to do that in an honest, real way is something you can't teach." He reprised his role in the sequel Black Phone 2. Thames also featured as a younger version of Cordell Walker in the first two seasons of Walker. He starred in the comedy film Incoming (2024).

Thames starred in David Henrie's independent film Monster Summer. He also starred as Hiccup Horrendous Haddock III in the 2025 live-action remake of How to Train Your Dragon (2010). He is expected to return in its sequel, which is scheduled to be released in 2027. In mid-2025, Thames joined the cast of two comedy films, Nimrods and Idiots, which were both released in August 2026.

Thames will be voicing the character of Dick Grayson / Nightwing in the upcoming DC Studios animated film Dynamic Duo.

== Filmography ==
=== Film ===
Key
†	Denotes films that have not yet been released

Year	Title	Role	Notes	Ref.
2017	After Omelas	Liam		
2021	The Black Phone	Finney Blake		
2024	Incoming	Benj Nielsen		
2024	Monster Summer	Noah Reed		
2025	How to Train Your Dragon	Hiccup Horrendous Haddock III		
2025	Nimrods	Tommy		
2025	Black Phone 2	Finney Blake		
2025	Regretting You	Miller Adams		
2026	Idiots	Sheridan Kimberley		
2027	How to Train Your Dragon 2 †	Hiccup Horrendous Haddock III	Post-production	
2028	Dynamic Duo †	Dick Grayson (voice)	Post-production	
TBA	Caine †	TBA	Post-production	

=== Television ===
Year	Title	Role	Notes	Ref.
2019	For All Mankind	Danny Stevens	3 episodes	
2020	Evel	Robbie	Episode: "Pilot"	
2021–2022	Walker	Young Cordell Walker	3 episodes	

=== Music video ===
Year	Title	Artist	Role	Ref.
2026	"Bones and All"	Mckenna Grace	Boy	

== Accolades ==
Award	Year (Note: Where available, "Year" is linked to the specific ceremony.)	Category	Film	Result	Ref.
Fangoria Chainsaw Awards	2023	Editor's Eyeball on the Future Award	The Black Phone	Won	
Saturn Awards	2022	Best Younger Actor in a Film	The Black Phone	Nominated	
Saturn Awards	2026	Best Younger Actor in a Film	How to Train Your Dragon	Nominated	
Washington D.C. Area Film Critics Association	2025	Best Youth Performance	How to Train Your Dragon	Nominated	
