= James Ransone =

American actor (1979–2025)

- Ransone as "Deputy So-and-So" in Sinister 2 (2015)
- Born: James Finley Ransone III; June 2, 1979; Baltimore, Maryland, U.S.
- Died: December 19, 2025 (aged 46); Los Angeles, California, U.S.
- Other name: PJ
- Occupation: Actor
- Years active: 2001–2025
- Spouse: Jamie McPhee
- Children: 2

James Finley Ransone III (June 2, 1979 – December 19, 2025) was an American actor. Known for his roles in horror and drama, he played Ziggy Sobotka in the second season of the drama series The Wire, Cpl. Josh Ray Person in the war drama miniseries Generation Kill (2008), Deputy "So-and-So" in the supernatural horror films Sinister (2012) and Sinister 2 (2015), Chester in Tangerine (2015), adult Eddie Kaspbrak in It Chapter Two (2019), and Max in The Black Phone (2021).

== Early life and education ==
James Finley Ransone III was born on June 2, 1979, in Baltimore, Maryland, the son of Joyce (née Peterson) and James Finley Ransone II, a Vietnam War veteran. He was educated at the George Washington Carver Center for Arts and Technology in Towson, Maryland, and attended the School of Visual Arts in Manhattan for one year, before dropping out. After working as a party photographer for Patrick McMullan, at age 19, for a brief period of time, he started working in art films.

== Career ==
In 2002, Ransone co-starred in the Larry Clark drama film Ken Park as Tate. In 2003, he appeared in 12 episodes of The Wire, as Ziggy Sobotka, which gained Ransone wider recognition. He had a supporting role in Spike Lee's 2006 heist movie Inside Man as bank robber, Steve-O. Also in 2006, Ransone guest started in an episode of Jericho as an FBI informant in a terrorist group. He starred in the 2008 miniseries Generation Kill as Cpl. Josh Ray Person. In 2010, he was cast in a recurring role in the HBO comedy series How to Make It in America, and the following year, appeared in a recurring role in the HBO drama series Treme. In 2012, he starred in the drama film Starlet. The following year, he starred in the AMC drama series Low Winter Sun as gangster Damon Callis. This reunited Ransone with his Jericho co-star Lennie James.

Ransone then appeared in the 2012 horror film Sinister in the supporting role of Deputy So-and-So. In June 2014, he joined the cast of the Western film In a Valley of Violence. Also in 2014, he starred in Small Engine Repair off-Broadway. In 2015, he had a supporting role in the comedy-drama film Tangerine. Following the success of Sinister, Ransone reprised his role in the 2015 sequel Sinister 2, this time as the film's main character. In 2016, he appeared in Season 2 of the drama series Bosch as Eddie Arceneaux.

In 2019, Ransone portrayed the adult Eddie Kaspbrak in the horror film It Chapter Two, sharing the role with Jack Dylan Grazer, who played the younger version. In 2021, he appeared in The Black Phone, working again with Sinister director Scott Derrickson. He played Max, a drug addict who discovers his brother (played by Ethan Hawke) is a serial killer. He reprised the role for the 2025 sequel Black Phone 2 in a brief cameo. It was his final film appearance.

== Personal life and death ==
By the age of 27, Ransone had developed a heroin addiction and a debt of $30,000, but became sober shortly after, several months before filming Generation Kill, as shared in a 2016 profile with the Interview magazine.

In May 2021, Ransone wrote on his Instagram account that he was sexually abused for around six months by his math tutor in 1992, and that this was a factor in the alcohol and heroin addictions he later struggled with. He further described how the abuse led to a "lifetime of shame and embarrassment". He reported his allegations to Baltimore County Police in March 2020, but they declined to pursue the charges after an investigation. The Baltimore County School System was informed of the allegations, according to police; school officials acknowledged having been notified of a "concern" but declined to specify what actions had been taken.

Ransone was married to Jamie McPhee and had two children. On December 19, 2025, Ransone was found dead in a shed on his property. The Los Angeles Police Department investigators confirmed that no foul play was involved in his death; the Los Angeles County Medical Examiner's Office confirmed Ransone died by suicide via hanging at the age of 46.

Following his death, his wife shared a fundraiser for the National Alliance on Mental Illness on social media. Newsweek honored him as a "vocal advocate for sexual abuse survivors."

== Filmography ==
=== Film ===
Year	Title	Role	Notes	Ref.
2001	The American Astronaut	Bodysuit		
2002	Ken Park	Tate		
2003	Fan Mail	Ricky	Short film	
2003	Nola	Neo-Gothboy		
2004	A Dirty Shame	Dave "Dingy Dave"		
2004	Downtown: A Street Tale	Billy		
2004	Malachance	Mika		
2005	The Good Humor Man	Junebug		
2005	Granted!	Larry	Short film	
2006	Inside Man	Darius Peltz / Steve-O		
2006	Directions: The Plans Video Album		Segment: "What Sarah Said"	
2006	Puccini for Beginners	Lone Guy at Bistro		
2008	Prom Night	Detective Nash		
2009	The Perfect Age of Rock 'n' Roll	Chip Genson		
2010	The Next Three Days	Harvey "Harv"		
2011	The Lie	Weasel		
2011	The Son of No One	Thomas Prudenti		
2012	Sinister	Deputy So-and-So		
2012	Starlet	Mikey	Robert Altman Award for Best Ensemble Cast	
2012	Red Hook Summer	Kevin		
2013	Broken City	Todd Lancaster		
2013	Empire State	Agent Nugent		
2013	The Man Who Came Out Only at Night	The man	Short film	
2013	Oldboy	Dr. Tom Melby		
2013	Year of the Rat	Guy	Short film	
2014	Electric Slide	Jan Phillips		
2014	False True Love		Video short	
2014	This American Life: One Night Only at BAM	David	Video	
2014	Fruits De Mer	George	Short film	
2014	Cymbeline	Philario		
2014	Kristy	Scott		
2015	Tangerine	Chester		
2015	The Timber	Wyatt		
2015	Bloomin Mud Shuffle	Lonnie		
2015	Sinister 2	Ex-Deputy So-and-So		
2015	Mr. Right	Von Cartigan		
2015	Conventional	Stu Mac 3	Short film	
2016	In a Valley of Violence	Deputy Gilly Martin		
2016	Light Up the Night	Joe	Short film	
2017	It Happened in L.A.	Heath		
2017	Gemini	Stan		
2017	The Clapper	Darth Guy		
2017	Cabiria, Charity, Chastity	Anthony, The Strongman	Video short	
2018	Family Blood	Christopher		
2018	Write When You Get Work	Steven Noble		
2018	Doulo	Edwin	Short film	
2018	Tough Love	Man	Short film	
2019	Captive State	Patrick Ellison		
2019	It Chapter Two	Eddie Kaspbrak	Shared role with Jack Dylan Grazer	
2020	What We Found	Steve Mohler		
2021	Small Engine Repair	P.J.		
2021	The Black Phone	Max		
2023	V/H/S/85	Bobby	Segment: "Dreamkill"	
2025	Black Phone 2	Max	Cameo appearance	

=== Television ===
Year	Title	Role	Notes
2001	Law & Order	Mark Dale/Michael Wayland	2 episodes
2002	Third Watch	Frankie	2 episodes
2002	Ed	Gary Morton	Episode: "Power of the Person"
2003	The Wire	Ziggy Sobotka	12 episodes
2005	CSI: Crime Scene Investigation	Zack Capola	Episode: "Iced"
2006	Love Monkey	Glenn	Episode: "The Window"
2007	Jericho	Daryl	Episode: "A.K.A."
2008	Generation Kill	Corporal Josh Ray Person	Miniseries; 7 episodes
2010	How to Make It in America	Tim	7 episodes
2010	Burn Notice	Dennis Wayne Barfield	Episode: "Eyes Open"
2011	Hawaii Five-0	Johnny D. / Perry Hutchinson	Episode: "Ne Me'e Laua Na Paio"
2011	Treme	Nick	10 episodes
2013	Low Winter Sun	Damon Callis	Main cast
2016	Bosch	Eddie Arceneaux	8 episodes
2018	Mosaic	Michael O'Connor	6 episodes
2018	The First	Nick Fletcher	Main cast
2018	Deadwax	Scotty	Episode: "Part One"
2020	50 States of Fright	Sebastian Klepner	2 episodes
2020	SEAL Team	Reiss Julian	5 episodes
2025	Poker Face	Juice	Episode: "One Last Job"

=== Theater ===
Year	Title	Role	Venue	Company	Notes
2013	Small Engine Repair	Packie	Lucille Lortel Theatre	MCC Theater	
