= List of Gonzaga University alumni =

Notable GU graduates
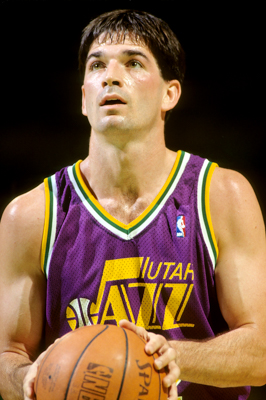
John Stockton '84, NBA Hall of Famer, Olympic gold medalist

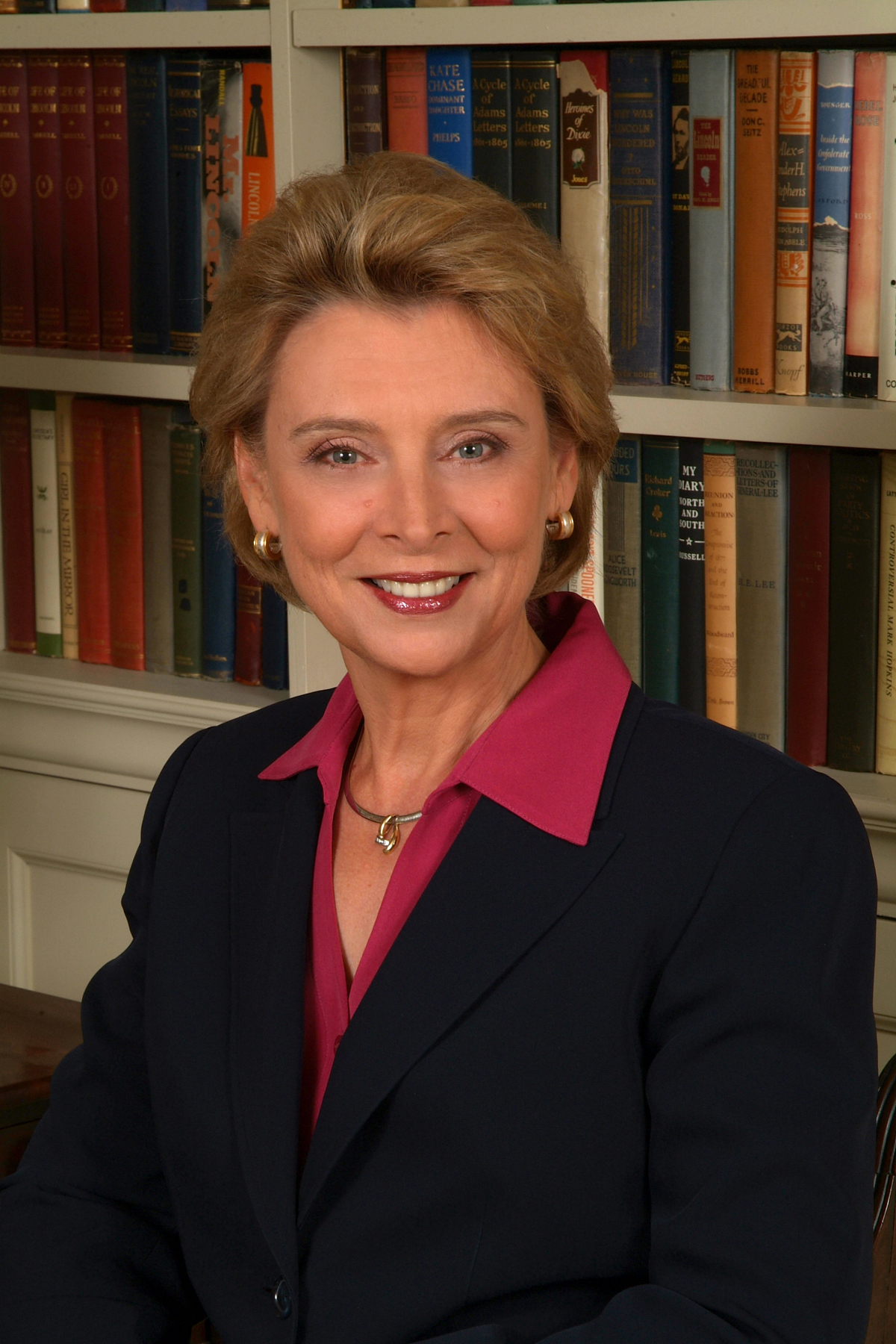
Christine Gregoire '77, 22nd governor of Washington

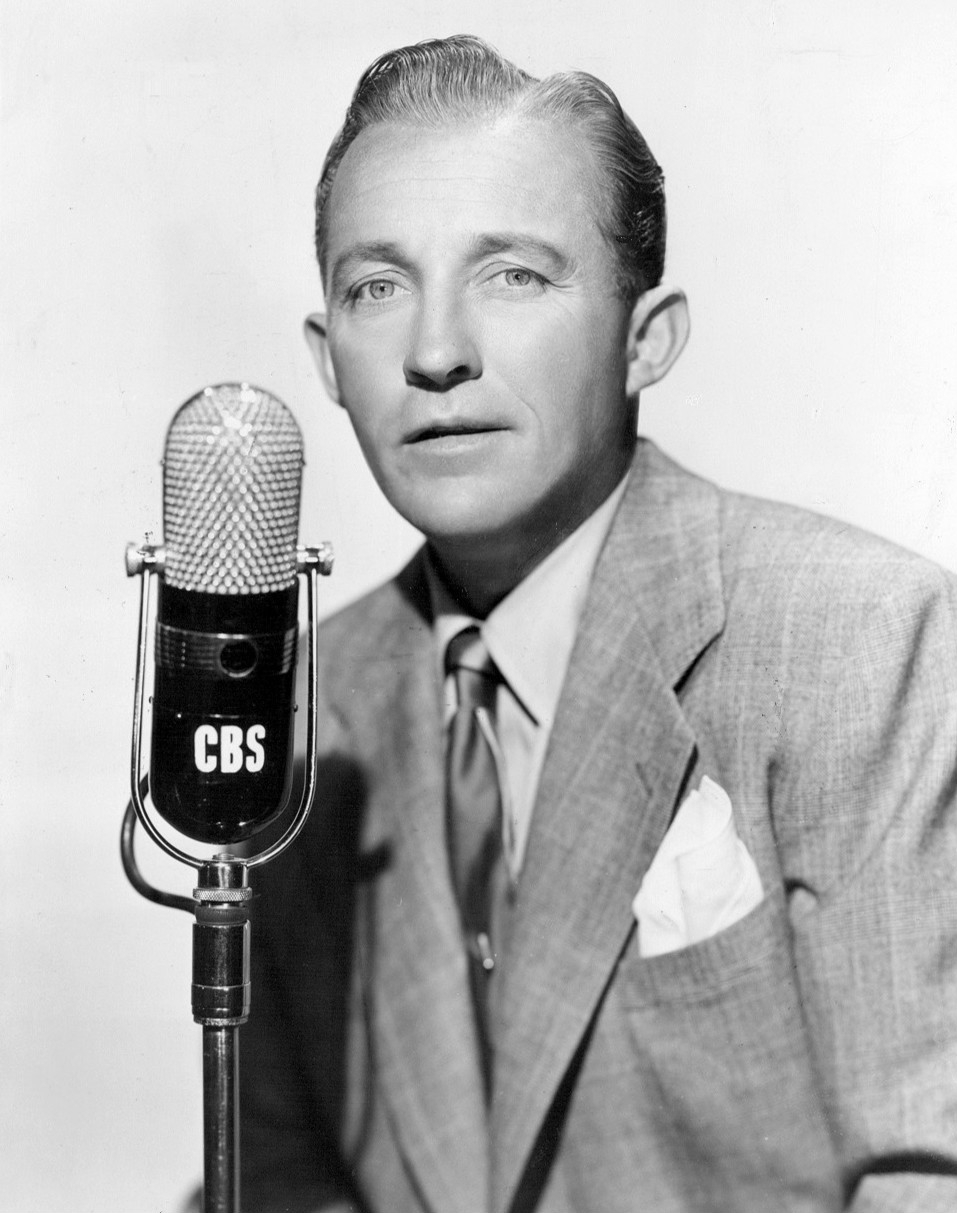
Bing Crosby, Academy Award-winning actor and singer

This list of Gonzaga University alumni includes notable graduates, non-graduate former students, and current students of Gonzaga University, a private, coeducational research university located in Spokane, Washington, United States.

== Academia and research ==
=== University administration ===
Name	Class year(s)	Degree(s)	Notability	Reference
Arthur A Dugoni	1944	B.S.	Namesake and dean of the University of the Pacific Arthur A. Dugoni School of Dentistry	
Thayne McCulloh	1989	B.A.	26th president of Gonzaga University	
John Lo Schiavo	1949	B.A. M.A.	25th president of University of San Francisco	

=== Professors ===
Name	Class year(s)	Degree(s)	Notability	Reference
Amy Doneen	2014	DNP	First DNP graduate, co-founder of BaleDoneen Method, and professor at Elson S. Floyd College of Medicine, University of Kentucky College of Dentistry, and Texas Tech University Health Sciences Center	

== Business ==
Name	Class year(s)	Degree(s)	Notability	Reference
Mark Britton	1989	BBA	Founder of Avvo	

== Entertainment ==
Name	Class year(s)	Degree(s)	Notability	Reference
Bing Crosby	1920-1924	Attended 3 years, no degree; Ph.D. (Hon. Causa), 1937	Entrepreneur, singer-songwriter, film producer	
Dan Cummins			Comedian and podcast host	

== Government ==
=== Federal government ===
Name	Class year(s)	Degree(s)	Notability	Reference
Joseph Caravalho	1979	B.S.	U.S. Army major general, joint staff surgeon	
Catherine Cortez Masto	1990	J.D.	United States senator for Nevada	
George Nethercutt	1971	J.D.	Former member of the United States House of Representatives for Washington's 5th congressional district	
Thomas O. Rice	1983; 1986	BBA; J.D.	Chief United States district judge for the Eastern District of Washington	

=== State governments ===
Name	Class year(s)	Degree(s)	Notability	Reference
Mary Fairhurst	1983	J.D.	Chief justice of Washington	
Christine Gregoire	1977	J.D.	22nd governor of Washington	
Richard P. Guy	1959	J.D.	Chief justice of Washington	
Barbara Madsen	1977	J.D.	Chief justice of Washington	
Mike McGrath	1984	J.D.	Chief justice of Montana	
Mike Pellicciotti	2004	J.D.	24th treasurer of Washington	
Debra L. Stephens	1993	J.D.	Chief justice of Washington	

== Sports ==
=== Basketball ===
Name	Class year(s)	Degree(s)	Notability	Reference
Brandon Clarke	2019		Power forward for the Memphis Grizzlies	
Zach Collins	2017		Power forward/center for the San Antonio Spurs	
Dan Dickau	2002	B.A.	Point guard for six professional teams in the NBA	
Richie Frahm	2000	B.A.	Shooting guard for five professional teams in the NBA	
Rui Hachimura	2019		Power forward for the Los Angeles Lakers	
Chet Holmgren	2022		Center for the Oklahoma City Thunder	
Przemek Karnowski	2017	BBA	Center for BC Andorra	
Corey Kispert	2021	MBA	Small forward for the Washington Wizards	
Adam Morrison	2006		Small forward for the Charlotte Bobcats	
Andrew Nembhard	2022		Shooting guard for the Indiana Pacers	
Kelly Olynyk	2013	BBA	Center/power forward for the Utah Jazz	
Jeremy Pargo	2009	B.A.	Point guard for the three professional teams in the NBA, and 4-time champion in the Israeli Premier Basketball League	
Domantas Sabonis	2016	B.A.	Power forward for the Sacramento Kings	
Robert Sacre	2012	B.A.	Center for the Los Angeles Lakers	
John Stockton	1984	BBA	West Coast Athletic Conference Player of the Year in 1984; spent entire NBA career (1984–2003) as a point guard for the Utah Jazz; one of NBA's Top 50 players of all time; two Olympic gold medals (1992, 1996); Naismith Memorial Basketball Hall of Fame (2009)	
Jalen Suggs	2021		Point guard for the Orlando Magic	
Ronny Turiaf	2005	B.A.	Center for the seven professional teams in the NBA; NBA Champion	
Nigel Williams-Goss	2017	B.A.	Point guard for Olympiacos B.C.	
Kyle Wiltjer	2016	B.A.	Power forward for Unicaja Malaga	

- Jason Bay (born 1978), baseball outfielder for the Pittsburgh Pirates, Boston Red Sox, and New York Mets; Canadian baseball Hall of Fame inductee in 2019
- Geno Crandall, basketball player with Hapoel Be'er Sheva in the Israeli Basketball Premier League
- Ray Flaherty, NFL player and coach, inducted into the Pro Football Hall of Fame
- Brett Harris (born 1998), baseball third baseman for the Oakland Athletics
- Gabriel Hughes (born 2001), baseball pitcher for the Colorado Rockies; highest draft pick in Gonzaga Bulldogs baseball history (1.10)
- Eli Morgan (born 1996), baseball pitcher for the Cleveland Indians
- Josh Perkins (born 1995), basketball player for Hapoel Gilboa Galil of the Israeli Basketball Premier League
