= Alexandra Cunningham =

American dramatist

- Born: 1972 or 1973 (age 53–54)
- Occupations: playwright, screenwriter, television producer

Alexandra Cunningham (born 1972/73) is an American playwright, screenwriter, and television producer.

From 1998 through 2000, she attended the Lila Acheson Wallace American Playwrights Program at The Juilliard School.

Her plays include The Theory of Three and No. 11 (Blue and White).

Cunningham is most known as a writer and producer for ABC Studios' dramedy Desperate Housewives (2004–2010), having written more episodes of the show than any other writer besides showrunner Marc Cherry. Prior to Desperate Housewives, Cunningham produced and wrote for the action series Fastlane (2002–2003), and wrote episodes of NYPD Blue (2001), Pasadena (2002), and Rome (2005). She was a developer, executive producer, and writer for the U.S. version of Prime Suspect. She was also a writer for several episodes of Chance (2016–2017), starring Hugh Laurie as neuropsychiatrist Dr. Chance, which aired on Hulu for two seasons. Most recently, she created and executive produces the Bravo series Dirty John, based on the podcast of the same name by Christopher Goffard. Starring Connie Britton and Eric Bana, it premiered on November 25, 2018. The second season focused on Betty Broderick and starred Amanda Peet and Christian Slater.
