= Dugoni =

Dugoni is an Italian surname. Notable people with the surname include:

- Antonio Dugoni (1827–1874), Italian painter
- Arthur A. Dugoni (1925–2020), American dentist
- Bruno Dugoni (1905–1959), Italian footballer
- Graham Dugoni (born 1986), American soccer player and entrepreneur
