= Rock Paper Shotgun =

Video game website and blog

- Company type: Subsidiary
- Website type: Video game journalism
- Headquarters: London, England
- Owner: Gamer Network
- Founders: Kieron Gillen; Jim Rossignol; Alec Meer; John Walker
- Editor: Graham Smith
- Industry: Video game industry
- Website: rockpapershotgun.com
- Registration: Optional
- Launched: 2007; 19 years ago
- Current status: Active

Rock Paper Shotgun (also rendered as Rock, Paper, Shotgun) is a British video game journalism website. It was launched in 2007 to focus on PC games and was acquired by Gamer Network, a network of sites led by Eurogamer, in May 2017.

== History ==
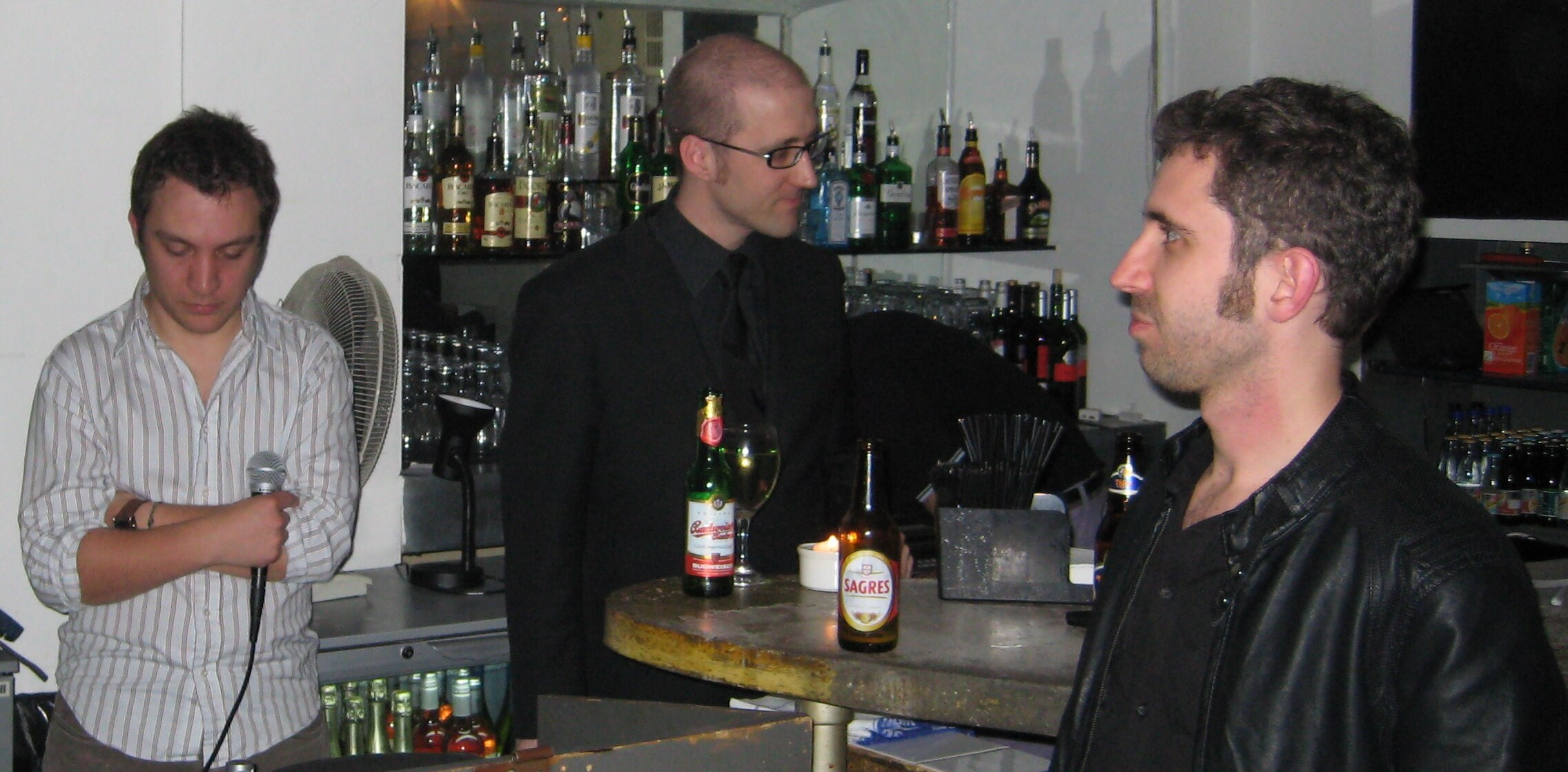
Left to right: Jim Rossignol, Kieron Gillen, Alec Meer at RPS Thinkosium 2008

Rock Paper Shotgun was founded by Kieron Gillen, Jim Rossignol, Alec Meer and John Walker in 2007. Gillen announced that he would no longer be involved in posting the day-to-day content of Rock Paper Shotgun in 2010, focusing more on his work with Marvel Comics. Rossignol founded his own game studio, Big Robot, in 2010. Meer and Walker left in 2019.

In June 2010, Rock Paper Shotgun began an advertising partnership with the Eurogamer Network. Also in the year, Rock Paper Shotgun partnered with Eurogamer to create Rezzed, a PC and indie games show spun off from the Eurogamer Expo. In May 2017, Gamer Network acquired the site outright. A year later, website has partnered again with EGX to launch a new game jam, designed to showcase and promote a standout indie game developer or team.

The Gamer Network was acquired by ReedPOP in 2018, making the site a subsidiary of RELX Group. In May 2024, IGN Entertainment acquired the Gamer Network, making Rock Paper Shotgun a subsidiary of Ziff Davis.

== Controversies and reception ==
On 5 January 2011, Game Informer editor-in-chief Andrew Reiner issued legal threats against Rock Paper Shotgun and its readers for posting exclusive Game Informer images from the Tomb Raider reboot. Rock Paper Shotgun later deleted the images the same day. One month later, the game Bulletstorm came under scrutiny by Fox News. These claims were largely ridiculed among gaming websites, including Rock Paper Shotgun, who ran a series of articles discrediting the reports by Fox News. The articles analysed Carole Lieberman's claims and found only one of eight sources she provided had anything to do with the subject at hand. Fox News acknowledged that they had been contacted by Rock Paper Shotgun and responded to their claims on 20 February 2011 through another article, stating that the game still remained a threat to children.

It won the best Games blog accolade at the 2011 Games Media Awards.
