= Lisa Collier Cool =

American journalist and author

- Born: July 6, 1952
- Occupation: Journalist
- Website: www.lisacolliercool.com

Lisa Collier Cool (born July 6, 1952) is an American journalist and author who writes on health-related topics.

== Education ==
Born Lisa Collier, Cool began collegiate studies in the early 1970s at Shimer College. She later transferred to Columbia University in New York, where she graduated in 1975.

== Career ==
Cool worked as a literary agent prior to becoming a full-time freelance, magazine article writer in 1984. Several of her subsequent books drew on her insights as an agent. She has also written for the AP, Glamour, Oprah Magazine, The Wall Street Journal, Harper's Bazaar, Reader’s Digest, Essence, Prevention and Writer's Digest.

In 1997, Cool co-wrote the book Bad Boys: Why We Love Them, How to Live With Them, and When to Leave Them with Carole Lieberman. The book has since been translated into several languages. The 2001 book Beware the Night, written by Cool and New York City police officer Ralph Sarchie, was adapted as the motion picture Deliver Us from Evil. In 2014, Cool co-wrote the book Beat the Heart Attack Gene: The Revolutionary Plan to Prevent Heart Disease, Stroke, and Diabetes with Bradley Bale and Amy Doneen.

She is a regular contributor to Yahoo Health, WebMD and numerous other online and print magazines.

From 2003 to 2005, she served as president of American Society of Journalists and Authors (ASJA).

== Awards ==
Cool received a National Magazine Award for Personal Service in 1989 for an article in Good Housekeeping titled "The Preventable Cancer". She received an Outstanding Service Award from ASJA in 2012, and is a three-time winner of that organization's June Roth Medical Journalism Award in 2007, 2003 and in 1996. Other awards include ASJA's Donald Robinson Investigative Journalism Award in 1997 and its Outstanding Article Award in 2001. She was recognized particularly for her work on fundraising and supporting the ASJA's Writers Emergency Assistance Fund, a charity of which she served as chair and a Trustee from 2006 to 2016.

== Personal life ==
Cool and her husband have three children.

== Works ==
Non-fiction:

- How to Sell Every Magazine Article You Write (1986), writing ISBN 9780898792362
- How to Write Irresistible Query Letters (1987), writing ISBN 9780898792591
- How to Give Good Phone: Telephone Techniques to Increase Your Power, Profits and Performance (1988), guide ISBN 1556110502
- Bad Boys: How We Love Them, How to Live with Them, When to Leave Them (1997), with Carole Lieberman, self-help ISBN 9780525941163
- Beware the Night: A New York City Cop Investigates the Supernatural (2001), with Ralph Sarchie, true events ISBN 0312977379
- Beat the Heart Attack Gene: The Revolutionary Plan to Prevent Heart Disease, Stroke, and Diabetes (2013), with Bradley Bale and Amy Doneen, health ISBN 9781118454299
- Healthy Heart, Healthy Brain: The Personalized Path to Protect Your Memory, Prevent Heart Attacks and Strokes, and Avoid Chronic Illness (2022), with Bradley Bale and Amy Doneen, health ISBN 9781549189203
