= Eric Bana =

Australian actor (born 1968)

Eric Bana AM
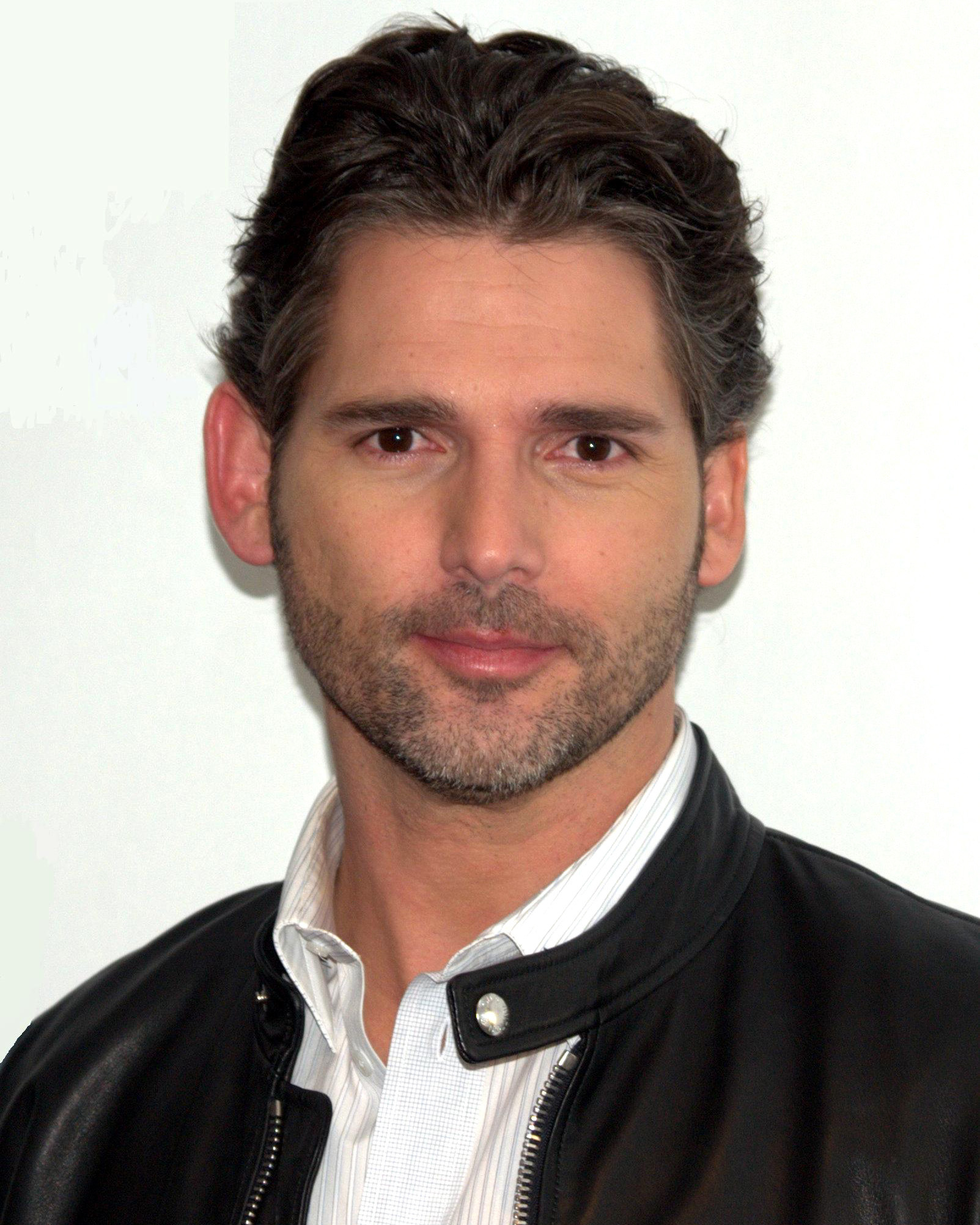
- Bana in 2009
- Born: Eric Banadinovich; 9 August 1968 (age 58); Melbourne, Victoria, Australia
- Occupations: Actor; producer
- Years active: 1993–present
- Spouse: Rebecca Gleeson (m. 1997)
- Children: 2
- Relatives: Murray Gleeson (father-in-law); Jacqueline Gleeson (sister-in-law)

Signature
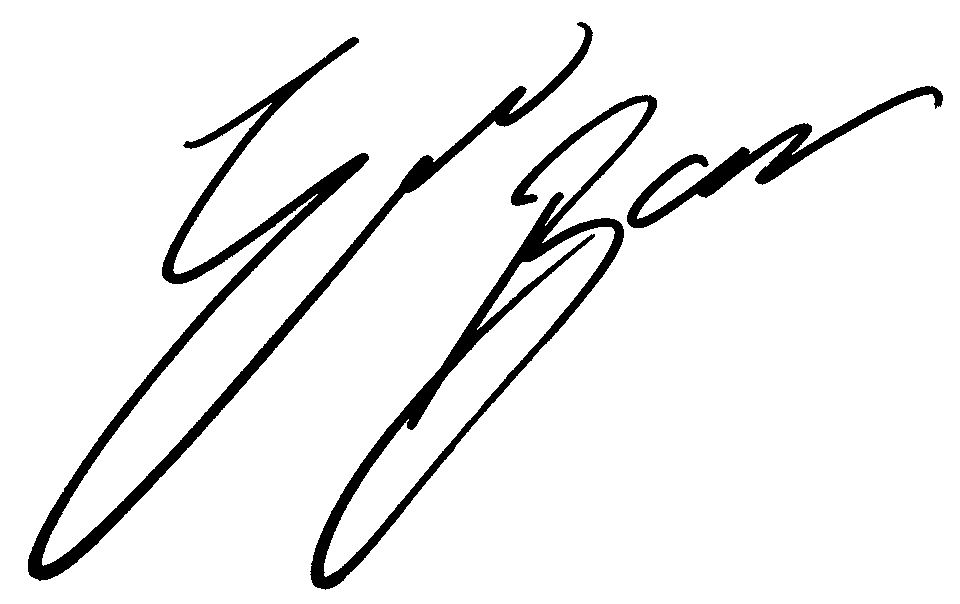

Eric Banadinovich (born 9 August 1968), known professionally as Eric Bana (/ˈbænə/ BAN-ə), is an Australian actor and producer. He began his career in the sketch-comedy series Full Frontal before gaining notice in the comedy drama The Castle (1997) and the biographical crime film Chopper (2000) for which he won the AACTA Award for Best Actor in a Leading Role.

After a decade of roles in Australian television shows and films, Bana gained Hollywood's attention for his performance in the war film Black Hawk Down (2001) and for playing Bruce Banner in the superhero film Hulk (2003). He played Hector in the war epic Troy (2004), and took a leading role in Steven Spielberg's historical thriller Munich (2005). In 2009, he played the villain Nero in the science-fiction film Star Trek, which was a critical and commercial success. Bana continued to work steadily in the 2010s, portraying Lieutenant Commander Erik S. Kristensen in Lone Survivor (2013), and playing police Sergeant Ralph Sarchie in the horror film Deliver Us from Evil (2014). In 2018, Bana played the title role in a true crime miniseries, Dirty John. In 2020, he returned to Australia to star in the outback thriller The Dry.

Bana is the recipient of several Australian Film Institute awards and has performed distinctive lead and character roles across a wide spectrum of genres – from epics to science fiction and action thrillers. In addition to acting, Bana is a motor-racing enthusiast, and has participated in various racing competitions in Australia. He was appointed Member of the Order of Australia (AM) in the 2019 Birthday Honours for his services to drama.

== Early life and education ==
Eric Banadinovich was born on 9 August 1968 in Melbourne, Victoria. His father, Ivan, was Croatian, born in Zagreb, and worked as a logistics manager for Caterpillar Inc., and his German mother, Eleanor, was a hairdresser, originally from near Mannheim in Germany. He has one older brother, Anthony. He has said that he has "always been proud of my origin, which had a big influence on my upbringing". He was raised Catholic.

Bana grew up in the Melbourne suburbs of Broadmeadows and Tullamarine, and attended Penleigh and Essendon Grammar School.

Showing acting skill early in life, Bana began doing impressions of family members at the age of six or seven, first mimicking his grandfather's walk, voice, and mannerisms. In school, he mimicked his teachers as a means to get out of trouble. As a teen, he watched the Mel Gibson film Mad Max, and decided he wanted to become an actor. He did not seriously consider a career in the performing arts, though, until 1991, when he was persuaded to try comedy while working as a barman at Melbourne's Castle Hotel. His stand-up gigs in inner-city pubs did not provide him with enough income to support himself, however, so he continued his work as a barman and waiting on tables.

== Career ==
=== 1993–1997: Beginnings ===
In 1993, Bana made his television debut on Steve Vizard's late-night talk show Tonight Live. His performance gained the attention of producers from the sketch-comedy series Full Frontal, who invited him to join the show as a writer and performer. During his four years on the show, Bana wrote much of his own material, and based some of his characters on members of his family. His impressions of Columbo, Arnold Schwarzenegger, Sylvester Stallone, Tom Cruise, and Australian TV personality Ray Martin made Bana popular with the show's audience. This success led him to record the comedy album Out of Bounds in 1994 and to host his own television special, titled Eric, in 1996. The show, a collection of sketches featuring everyday characters, prompted him to launch a sketch comedy series, The Eric Bana Show. The series, written and performed by Bana, featured skits, stand-up, and celebrity guests, but failed to attract a substantial audience and was cancelled after only eight episodes due to low ratings. Even so, in 1997, he received a Logie Award for "Most Popular Comedy Personality" for his work on the show.

In that same year, Bana made his film debut in the Australian film The Castle, which tells the story of a Melbourne-based family's struggles to keep their home by Melbourne's airport, as the airport authority force them to move. He was featured in a supporting role as Con Petropoulous, a kickboxing accountant who is the householder's son-in-law. The Castle was a surprise critical and financial success, earning A$10,326,428 at the box office in Australia.

=== 1998–2004: Hollywood breakthrough ===
In 1997, despite his inexperience with dramatic roles, Bana was approached by director Andrew Dominik to appear in the film Chopper (2000), a biographical film based on the life of infamous Australian criminal Chopper Read. Dominik had been working on the project for five years, but was unable to find an actor to portray Read. Only after Read himself suggested Bana, having seen him perform a skit on television, did Dominik consider him for the part.

For the role, Bana shaved his head, gained 14 kilograms (30 lb), and spent two days with Read to perfect his mimicry. During filming, he arrived on set at 4 am and spent five hours being covered in Read's trademark tattoos. In spite of the film's limited release outside of Australia, Bana's performance received positive reviews. American film critic Roger Ebert complimented Bana, stating that "in a comedian named Eric Bana the filmmakers have found, I think, a future star [...] He has a quality no acting school can teach you and few actors can match. You cannot look away from him". Chopper was a critical and financial success in Australia, and was nominated for Best Film at the Australian Film Institute Awards in 2000. Bana's performance won the Australian Film Institute Award for Best Actor.

In 2001, director Ridley Scott cast Bana as an American soldier in the film Black Hawk Down (2001). Scott, with a recommendation from Russell Crowe and impressed by Bana's performance in Chopper, did not require him to audition. In the film, he played Sergeant First Class Norm "Hoot" Hooten, an elite Delta Force soldier, who fights his way out of a battle in Mogadishu in Somalia after a mission to capture two top lieutenants of a renegade warlord goes awry. Bana shed the weight he had gained for Chopper and began an exercise regimen months before filming began. He also trained with Delta Force operators at Fort Bragg, learning to fire weapons and clear rooms. Between 2000 and 2001, Bana played Joe Sabatini in Something in the Air, an Australian soap opera set in a small town. After two seasons, Bana left the show to focus on his Hollywood career.

Bana's next project was 2002's low-budget Australian film The Nugget. A comedy, the film portrays the effect of instant wealth on three working-class men, and was released with moderate success in Australia. Bana read the script after filming Chopper in 2000, and was drawn to it because it reminded him of his childhood, and because he found its characters amusing and likeable. While filming The Nugget, Bana was offered the lead role of Bruce Banner in the film adaptation of the popular Marvel comic book series The Incredible Hulk. Only after learning of director Ang Lee's involvement in the project did he consider the role. Bana admired Lee for his work on the film The Ice Storm and agreed to work on the film before the final script was complete. He said he was drawn to the film because "the character of Bruce Banner had dramatic potential", and was "a fairly non-traditional superhero". Although Hulk (2003) received mixed reviews and was a moderate success at the box office, Bana's performance was highly praised: Jack Matthews of New York Daily News felt that Bana played the role of Bruce Banner "with great conviction".

In 2003, he voiced hammerhead shark Anchor in the critically and commercially acclaimed animated Pixar film Finding Nemo. In 2004, Bana co-starred with Brad Pitt and Orlando Bloom in the war epic Troy. He portrayed Prince Hector, leader of the Trojan forces battling against the Greek warrior Achilles in the Trojan War. When he read the script, he was drawn to Hector because, "I really felt a lot for him. I felt he was just a wonderful character [...] Orlando I love to death, and we've worked together before and when he was cast as my younger brother, it was just a great feel and I hope that shows in the film." Bana also had prepared for the role by taking lessons in sword training and learning to ride horseback. Although Troy's critical reaction was mixed, the film was a financial success, grossing US$497 million. Bana's portrayal was well received; Stella Papamichael of the BBC thought he was "magnetic", and The Washington Post's Desson Thomson believed his "touching" performance.

=== 2005–2010: Historical films and Star Trek ===
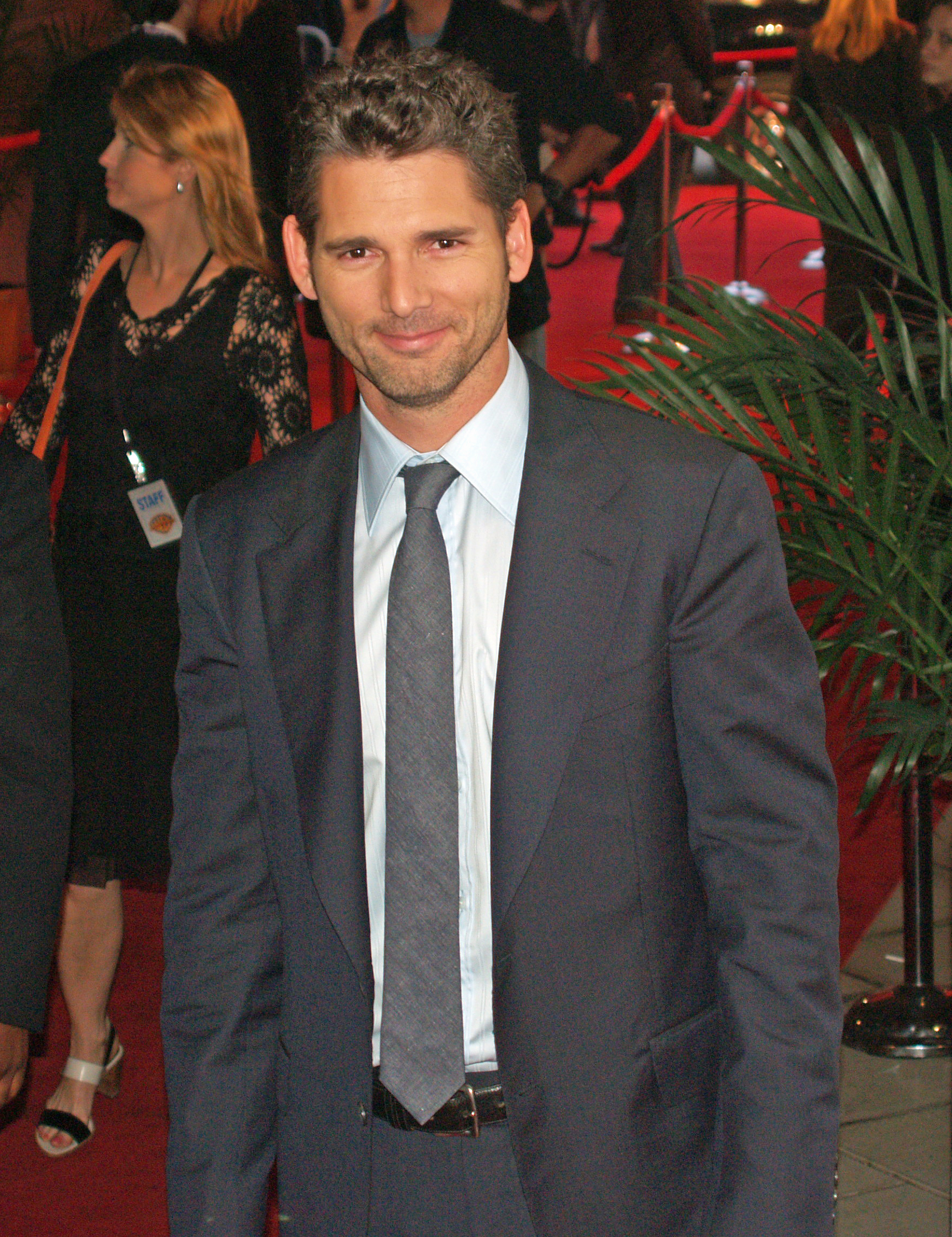
Bana at the premiere of Lucky You in May 2007

After the varied reception of Hulk and Troy, film critics questioned Bana's bankability in big-budget films. He responded in Empire: "It's not like it [Hulk] was a flop. When you're on a long shoot, it is a long personal investment. If I wasn't happy with the end result, I'd be bloody upset, but in every case so far, I've been happy. Troy could take $50 and I wouldn't regret it."

He co-starred with Daniel Craig and Geoffrey Rush in Steven Spielberg's controversial thriller Munich the following year. He played Avner, a Mossad agent, who is ordered to track down and kill the Black September terrorists thought to be responsible for the massacre of Israeli athletes at the 1972 Summer Olympics. The film garnered praise from critics, and grossed $131 million worldwide. It was nominated for five Academy Awards in 2006. The Los Angeles Times wrote that Bana as Avner "projects a combination of sensitivity and ruthlessness and [...] knows how to present a face for which worry is a new experience." The Telegraph was equally impressed with Bana's emotional and "sublimely convincing" portrayal.

In 2006, Bana was invited to join the Academy of Motion Picture Arts and Sciences. Lucky You, a romantic comedy on which Bana worked before filming Munich, was released in early 2007. In the film, he played Huck Cheever, a professional poker player who must overcome his personal problems to win a high-stakes tournament in Las Vegas. Lucky You was negatively received; one critic opined that Bana's performance "simply isn't appealing enough to make us care if he succeeds or fails." His next film was the Australian drama Romulus, My Father (2007). The film, based on Raimond Gaita's memoir of the same title, portrays a couple and their struggle in the face of adversity to raise their son. Upon release, the film was a critical success, and Bana's performance earned him a second Australian Film Institute Award for Best Actor.

Bana's next project was the historical drama The Other Boleyn Girl (2008), based on the 2001 novel of the same name. In this feature, he played Henry VIII of England opposite Scarlett Johansson and Natalie Portman. Bana was surprised to be offered the role and admitted that he "probably would have just passed it on without even opening it" if it had been presented to him under a different title. The following year, he co-starred with Chris Pine and Zachary Quinto in the science fiction film Star Trek. In the film, Bana played Nero, a Romulan mining ship captain who attempts to exact revenge on Spock, whom he blames for the destruction of his homeworld and its inhabitants. To prepare for the role, Bana shaved his head and donned face tattoos; director J. J. Abrams was impressed with his villainous appearance. The film was positively received, and grossed over US$380 million worldwide. Bana later recalled, "It was an unbelievable experience, and it's such a great group of actors", but he did not reprise his role in the 2013 sequel, saying "It was just a one-time for me."

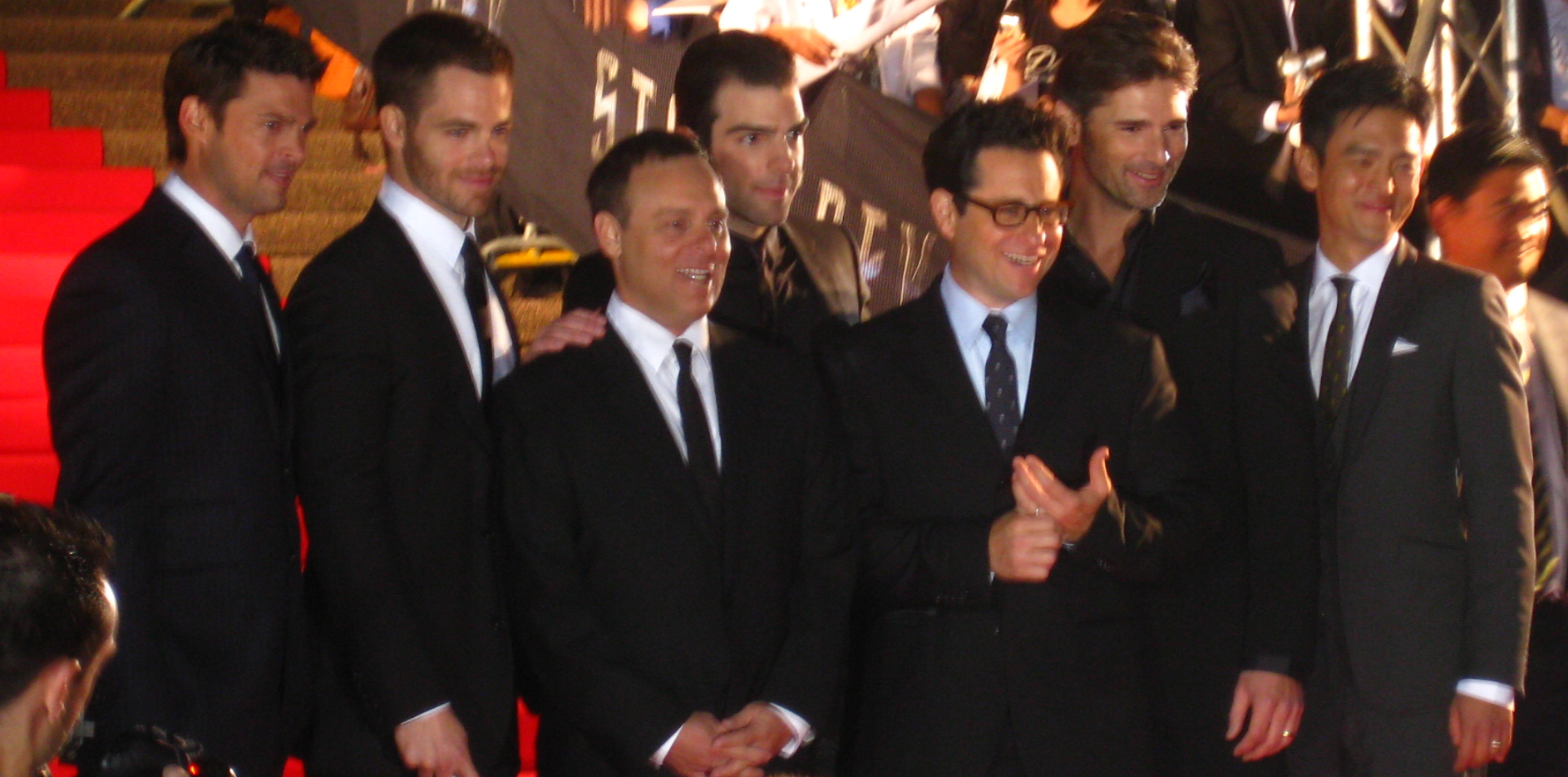
Star Trek premiere at Sydney Opera House, 2009

In 2009, he also appeared in the science fiction film The Time Traveller's Wife, based on Audrey Niffenegger's 2003 novel of the same title. Directed by Robert Schwentke, the film stars Rachel McAdams and Ron Livingston. The story follows Henry DeTamble (Bana), a Chicago librarian with a paranormal genetic disorder that causes him to randomly time travel as he tries to build a romantic relationship with Clare Abshire (McAdams), who would become his wife. While the film garnered mostly negative reviews, the critic from The Sydney Morning Herald complimented the chemistry between Bana and McAdams: "Together they achieve an intimacy which does its best to distract you from the flaws in the script".

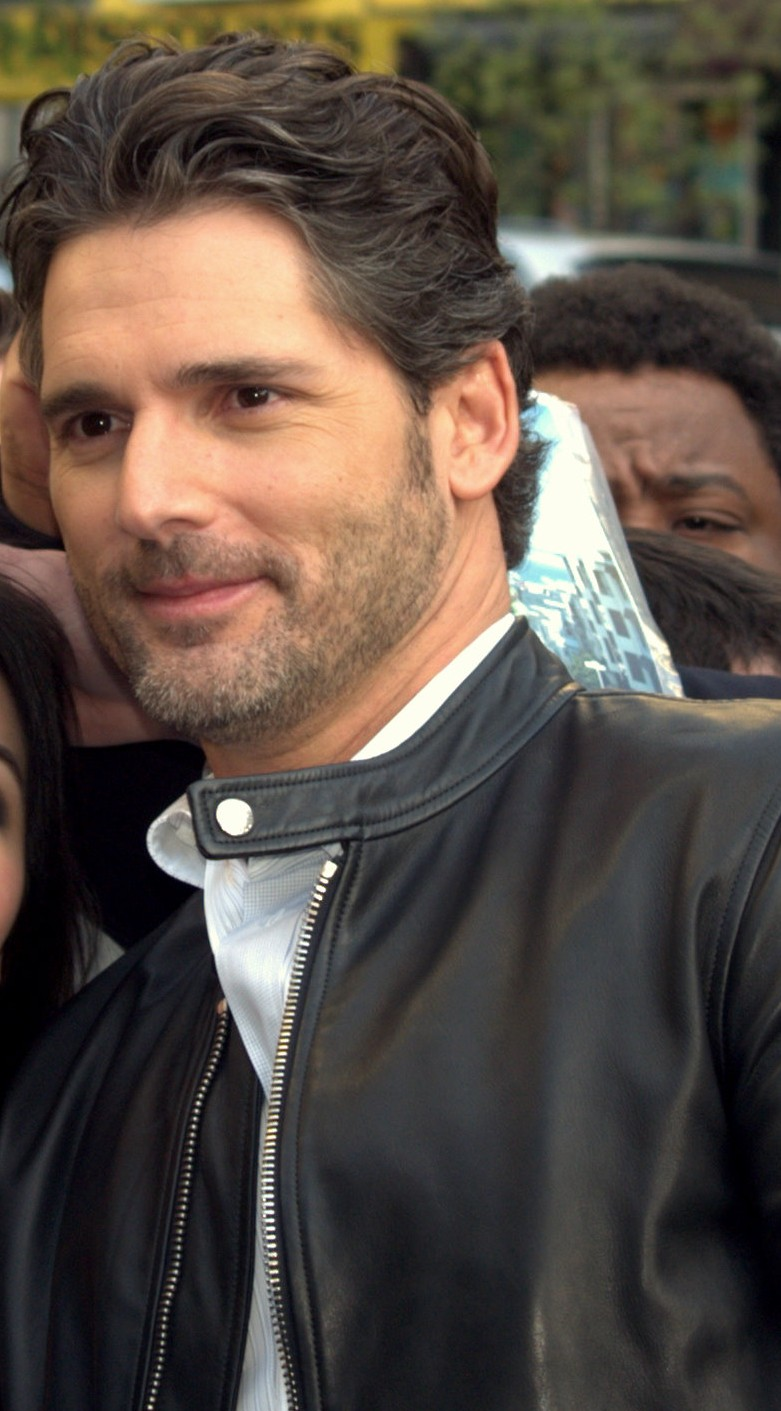
Bana at the 2009 Tribeca Film Festival

Bana co-starred with Adam Sandler and Seth Rogen in Judd Apatow's 2009 feature about a famous comedian, Funny People, marking Bana's first appearance in an American mainstream comedy. Rogen had cast Bana because he was a fan of his early television work, and was impressed by his performance in Munich. Peter Travers of Rolling Stone magazine gave the film 3½ out of 4 stars, and opined that Bana's performance showed "real comic flair". Also in 2009, Bana directed and starred in the documentary Love the Beast. It details his personal relationship with his first car, a Ford GT Falcon Coupe, and follows his progression as a car lover. Along the way, he seeks guidance and wisdom from his three lifelong friends, as well as celebrities Jay Leno, Jeremy Clarkson and Dr. Phil. Lastly, Bana provided the voice of Damien, a Greek Australian, in the animation Mary and Max (2009).

=== 2011–present: Career progression ===
In 2011, Bana played ex-CIA operative Erik Heller in the action thriller Hanna, starring alongside Saoirse Ronan and Cate Blanchett. The film became a success for Bana as it opened at number two at the United States box office. Several media outlets praised Bana's performance, with one critic describing it as having "a note of haunted soulfulness". A year later, Bana starred in Deadfall, a crime drama that follows two siblings who decide to fend for themselves after a failed casino heist. According to Metacritic, the film gained "mixed or average reviews, but Andrew O'Hehir of Salon magazine enjoyed Bana's "charismatic stone-cold killer character".

Bana portrayed Lieutenant Commander Erik S. Kristensen in Lone Survivor (2013). He said, "Pete Berg [the director] and I nearly worked together many, many years ago before anyone knew who I was and we stayed in contact [...] he called me and told me he was making the film and would like me to play the mission commander Kristensen, I just jumped at the chance. I love the story. I thought it could potentially make a compelling movie and I knew that Pete was the right person for the job". Upon release, Lone Survivor grossed US$154.8 million at the worldwide box office. Variety magazine thought that Bana was well cast, and critic Mick LaSalle praised the actors for being "convincing in their humanity, agony and ferocity". Bana then appeared alongside Rebecca Hall in the thriller Closed Circuit (2013), as a lawyer defending a Turkish man accused of planning a terrorist attack in London. Upon release, the Chicago Reader critic thought Bana and Hall lacked chemistry.

The following year, Bana starred as Ralph Sarchie, a police sergeant who investigates paranormal cases, in the supernatural horror Deliver Us from Evil. The film was released on 2 July 2014 and grossed US$87.9 million worldwide. Several critics disliked the film, including Donald Clarke of The Irish Times who thought Bana was miscast. In 2016, he played Frank Bonneville, a struggling radio journalist in Ricky Gervais's Special Correspondents. It premiered at the Tribeca Film Festival, and Netflix bought the rights to stream the film on its platform. Although reviews were largely negative, one reviewer thought Bana "upstaged" Gervais and gave a watchable performance. Bana also had a role in Disney's The Finest Hours (2016), playing Coast Guard warrant officer David Cluff. In that same year, Bana played doctor Stephen Grene in The Secret Scripture, based on the novel of the same title by Sebastian Barry. Although the film was poorly received, Sandra Hall from The Sydney Morning Herald thought Bana's character showed "quiet intensity".

In 2017, Bana took the role of Uther Pendragon, king of Britain and father of future King Arthur, in Guy Ritchie's King Arthur: Legend of the Sword (2017). In the same year, Bana starred in a British drama, The Forgiven, playing the murderer Piet Blomfield. The Forgiven gained a mixed reception; The critic for The Village Voice praised the acting but opined that the film was unfocused. In 2018, Bana played John in the Bravo miniseries Dirty John, based on the true crime podcast of the same name by Christopher Goffard. Creator Alexandra Cunningham said that Bana was her first choice for the lead role; Bana is very selective about picking the "right" characters. He said, "It doesn't matter what. Every film I've done, that's always been the guiding decision-making thing, for sure." David Sexton of the Evening Standard thought he was perfect: "Bana is terrific as Dirty John, so sexy and appealing yet creepy too."

In 2021, Bana starred in a mystery drama, The Dry, based on the book of the same name by Jane Harper. In that same year, Bana provided the voice of zookeeper Chaz in the animation Back to the Outback. In 2022, he voiced Monterey Jack in the animation Chip 'n Dale: Rescue Rangers, and appeared in the drama Blueback, which premiered at the Toronto International Film Festival. In 2025, Bana starred in Netflix's Untamed, a mystery miniseries set in Yosemite National Park with co-stars Lily Santiago, Rosemarie DeWitt and Sam Neill.

== Personal life ==
On official identity documents he still has his birth surname, Banadinović.

In 1995 while working on the television series Full Frontal, Bana began dating Rebecca Gleeson, a publicist with the Seven Network and daughter of then Chief Justice of New South Wales, and later Chief Justice of Australia, Murray Gleeson. They married in 1997, after Bana proposed to her on a trip to the United States, which he won from Cleo Magazine after being named their "Bachelor of the Year" in 1996. Bana and Gleeson have two children together; Klaus (born 1999) and Sophia (born 2002). Klaus graduated from the Victorian College of the Arts with a degree in film and television, while Sophia completed two years of full-time dance and continues to pursue a degree at University of Melbourne. His sister-in-law is current High Court of Australia Judge Jacqueline Gleeson.

Bana was appointed Member of the Order of Australia (AM) in the 2019 Birthday Honours for his services to drama.

=== Interests and hobbies ===
Bana is a motor racing enthusiast, and participates in various racing competitions in Australia. At the age of 14, he wanted to leave school to focus full-time on becoming a motor mechanic, but his father convinced him to complete school, advising him to avoid making his hobby a job. Bana purchased his first car, a 1974 XB Ford Falcon coupé, at the age of 15 for A$1,100 and, driving it, made his motor sport racing debut in Targa Tasmania 1996, a week-long race around Tasmania. In 2004, Bana purchased a Porsche 944 to compete in Australia's Porsche Challenge. Competing throughout 2004 he often finished in the top ten, and in November finished fourth at the Sandown event, a personal best. On 21 April 2007, Bana crashed his 1974 XB Falcon Coupe in the 2007 Targa Tasmania rally; he and his co-driver were uninjured. Bana appeared on the British motoring show Top Gear on 15 November 2009 as a guest for its "Star in a Reasonably Priced Car" segment.

Bana is a prominent fan of Australian rules football. His love of the sport began at a young age when his godfather took him to games to see the St Kilda Football Club, his favourite team in the Australian Football League (AFL). Bana has been seen at AFL games when he is back in Australia. His love for St Kilda FC resulted in the club being featured in the film Funny People and in Bana's promotion of the film in 2009, notably on NBC's Late Night with Jimmy Fallon. In 2010, Bana was named the "Saints Number One Ticket Holder".

== Filmography ==
=== Film ===
Year	Title	Role	Notes	Ref
1997	The Castle	Con Petropoulous	Film debut	
2000	Chopper	Mark "Chopper" Read		
2001	Black Hawk Down	Norm "Hoot" Gibson		
2002	The Nugget	Lotto		
2003	Finding Nemo	Anchor	Voice role	
2003	Hulk	Bruce Banner / Hulk		
2004	Troy	Hector		
2005	Munich	Avner Kaufman		
2007	Lucky You	Huck Cheever		
2007	Romulus, My Father	Romulus Gaita	Also associate producer	
2008	The Other Boleyn Girl	Henry Tudor		
2009	Mary and Max	Damien Popodopolous	Voice role	
2009	Love the Beast	Himself	Documentary; also producer and director	
2009	Star Trek	Nero		
2009	The Time Traveller's Wife	Henry DeTamble		
2009	Funny People	Clarke		
2011	Hanna	Erik Heller		
2012	Deadfall	Addison		
2013	Closed Circuit	Martin Rose		
2013	Lone Survivor	Erik S. Kristensen		
2014	Paper Planes	—N/a	Executive producer	
2014	Deliver Us from Evil	Ralph Sarchie		
2016	The Finest Hours	Daniel Cluff		
2016	Special Correspondents	Frank Bonneville		
2016	The Secret Scripture	Dr. William Grene		
2017	King Arthur: Legend of the Sword	Uther Pendragon		
2017	The Forgiven	Piet Blomfeld		
2021	The Dry	Aaron Falk	Also producer	
2021	Back to the Outback	Chaz Hunt	Voice role	
2022	Chip 'n Dale: Rescue Rangers	Monterey Jack	Voice role	
2022	Blueback	Mad Macka	Also executive producer	
2024	Force of Nature: The Dry 2	Aaron Falk	Also producer	
2024	A Sacrifice	Ben Monroe	Also executive producer	
2024	Memoir of a Snail	James the Magistrate	Voice role	
2026	Apex	Tommy		

=== Television ===
Year	Title	Role	Notes	Ref
1993–1996	Full Frontal	Various	66 episodes	
1997	The Eric Bana Show Live	Various	8 episodes; also writer	
1999–2000	All Saints	Rob Biletsky	3 episodes	
2000–2001	Something in the Air	Joe Sabatini	202 episodes	
2003	Blue Heelers		1 episode	
2007	Kath & Kim	Himself	S4: Ep. 2	
2009	Top Gear	Himself	S14: Ep. 1	
2018	The Joel McHale Show With Joel McHale	Himself	Episode: "Roller Coaster?"	
2018	Dirty John	John Meehan	8 episodes; also executive producer	
2025	Untamed	Kyle Turner	6 episodes; also executive producer	

=== Video games ===
Year	Title	Voice role	Notes	Ref
2003	Hulk	Bruce Banner		

=== Theme parks ===
Year	Title	Voice role	Notes	Ref
2007	Finding Nemo Submarine Voyage	Anchor		

== Awards and nominations ==
Year	Association	Category	Nominated work	Result	Ref.
1997	Logie Awards	Most Popular Comedy Personality	Full Frontal	Won	
2000	Australian Film Institute	Best Actor in a Leading Role	Chopper	Won	
2005	MTV Movie Awards	Best Fight (with Brad Pitt)	Troy	Nominated	
2007	Australian Film Institute	Best Actor in a Leading Role	Romulus, My Father	Won	
2009	Teen Choice Awards	Choice Movie Villain	Star Trek	Nominated	

== See also ==
- List of Australian film actors
