= Spokane Community College =

Public college in Spokane, Washington, US

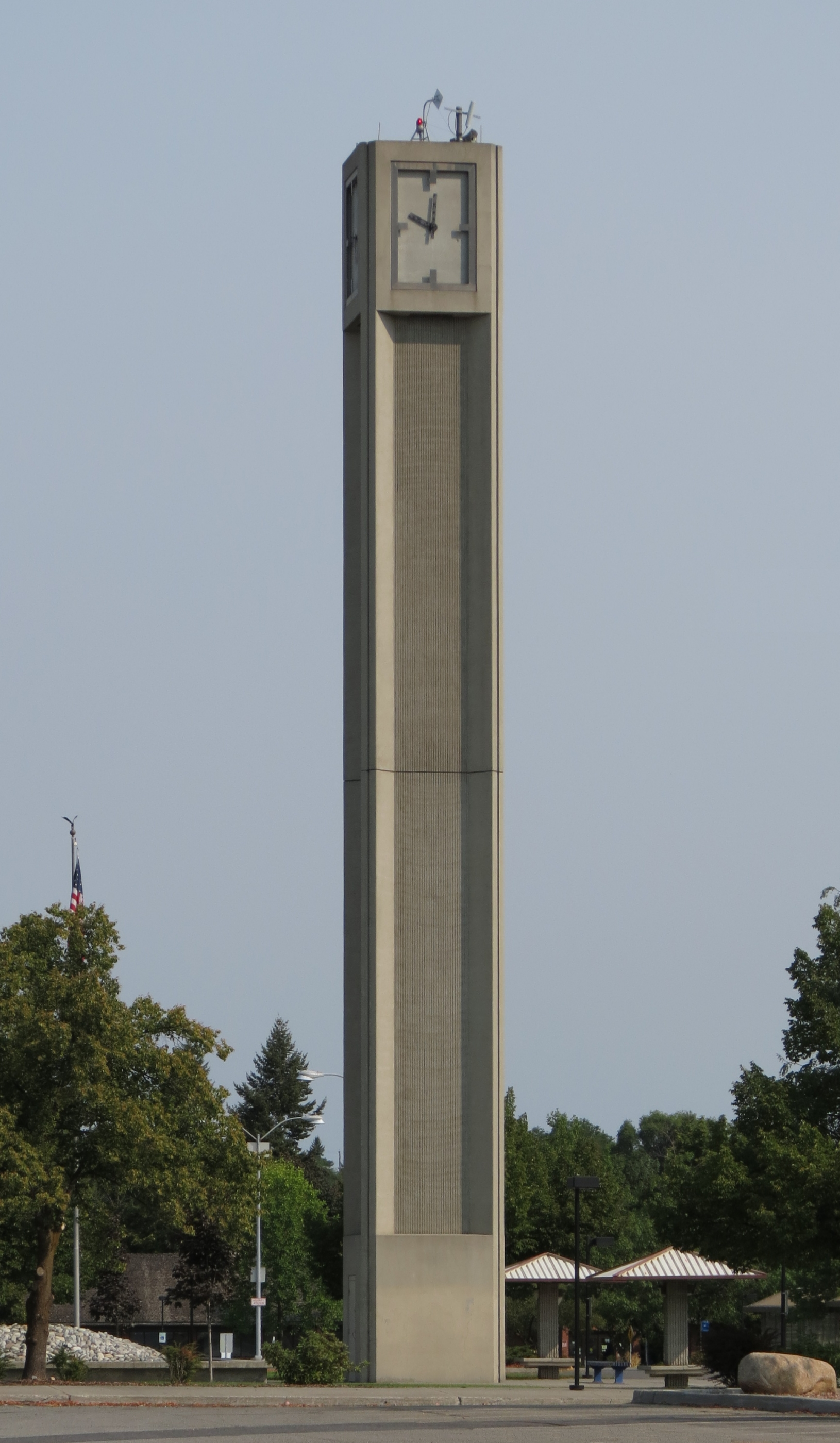
- SCC Clock Tower
- Motto: Inspire. Enrich. Uplift.
- Type: Public community college
- Established: 1963
- Parent institution: Community Colleges of Spokane
- President: Jenni Martin (interim)
- Students: 9,212 (2016)
- Location: Spokane, Washington, U.S. 47°40′29″N 117°21′31″W
- Campus: Urban, 148 acres (60 ha)
- Colors: Blue and gold
- Nickname: Bigfoot
- Sporting affiliations: National Junior College Athletic Association, Northwest Athletic Conference
- Mascot: Skitch
- Website: www.scc.spokane.edu

Spokane Community College is a public community college in Spokane, Washington, United States. It is part of the Community Colleges of Spokane and was established in 1963.

== Academics ==
SCC offers associate degree, bachelor's degrees, and certificates. SCC's health sciences division is the largest among community and technical colleges in Washington state. The college is accredited by the Northwest Commission on Colleges and Universities.

== Campus ==
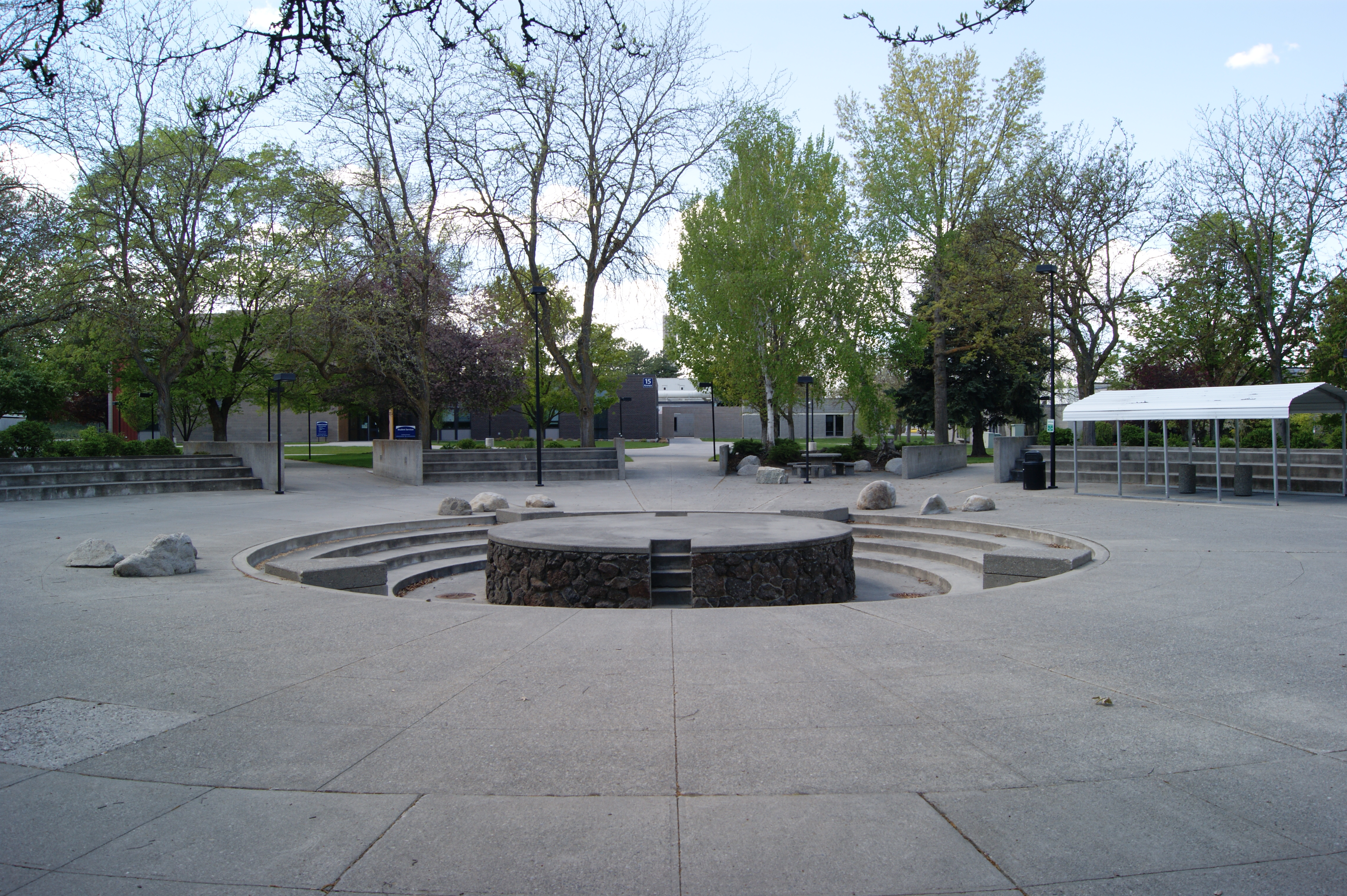
Central plaza on campus

SCC's campus of 23 administrative, academic and support buildings is located on 148 acres (0.60 km^{2}) next to the Spokane River in Spokane's Chief Garry Park neighborhood. An additional 10 acres (40,000 m^{2}) is used for off-campus facilities, including an Apprenticeship and Journeyman Training Center and Felts Field aviation hangar. In 2012–2013, the community colleges' Institute for Extended Learning merged with SCC, expanding its program offerings to include adult basic education, e.g., GED, ESL, High School Completion; Career Transitions; ACT 2 (continuing education for adult 50 and older; parent education and co-operative pre-schools; and rural education centers in Colville, Inchelium, Ione, Newport, and Republic.

== Athletics ==
SFCC partners with Spokane Community College as the Community Colleges of Spokane, using the team name the Sasquatch. They compete in the Northwest Athletic Conference (NWAC). The official colors are blue and gold.

Sports offered:

- Men's: basketball, baseball, soccer.
- Women's: volleyball, basketball, soccer, softball.
- Both: golf, track and field athletics (indoor and outdoor), cross country, tennis

== Notable alumni ==
- Amy Doneen, doctor of nursing practice and cofounder of the BaleDoneen Method
- Julianna Pena, mixed martial artist

== See also ==
- Spokane Community College Transit Center
