= Deliver Us from Evil (2014 film) =

2014 film by Scott Derrickson

- Theatrical release poster
- Directed by: Scott Derrickson
- Screenplay by: Scott Derrickson; Paul Harris Boardman
- Based on: Beware the Night by Ralph Sarchie; Lisa Collier Cool
- Produced by: Jerry Bruckheimer
- Starring: Eric Bana; Édgar Ramírez; Olivia Munn; Sean Harris; Joel McHale
- Cinematography: Scott Kevan
- Edited by: Jason Hellmann
- Music by: Christopher Young
- Production companies: Screen Gems; Jerry Bruckheimer Films; LStar Capital
- Distributed by: Sony Pictures Releasing
- Release date: July 2, 2014
- Running time: 118 minutes
- Country: United States
- Language: English
- Budget: $30 million
- Box office: $87.9 million

Deliver Us from Evil is a 2014 American supernatural horror film directed by Scott Derrickson and produced by Jerry Bruckheimer. The film claims to be based on a 2001 non-fiction book entitled Beware the Night by Ralph Sarchie and Lisa Collier Cool, and its marketing campaign highlighted that it was "inspired by actual accounts." However, the plot is an original piece written by director Derrickson and his co-writer Paul Harris Boardman. The film stars Eric Bana, Édgar Ramírez, Sean Harris, Olivia Munn, and Joel McHale in the main roles and was released on July 2, 2014. The film grossed $87.9 million against a $30 million budget.

== Plot ==
In Iraq in 2010, a four-man Marine team approaches a firefight across open desert. One Marine is shot in the head, while the others pursue hostile forces into a tree line. After injuring several hostiles with a grenade, they discover an underground stairwell. Two descend, and PFC J. Tratner activates a bodycam. At the bottom, they encounter a foul smell and an apparent room; their lights and camera suddenly fail, followed by screams.

In The Bronx in 2013, veteran NYPD Special Operations Sergeant Ralph Sarchie and his partner Butler respond to a domestic disturbance involving former Marine Jimmy Tratner, whose wife has been badly beaten. Deep scratches cover the floor, and Sarchie arrests Tratner after he flees. The officers assume he is mentally ill or intoxicated.

Sarchie and Butler later investigate a woman, Jane Crenna, who threw her toddler into the lion enclosure at the Bronx Zoo. They find her in the lemur pen, scraping the ground while reciting "Break On Through (To the Other Side)". Sarchie encounters a commercial painter inside the lion enclosure but is attacked by the lions. After Jane is transferred to a mental health facility, Jesuit priest Mendoza visits her family, who suspect something supernatural is occurring.

Responding to another disturbance, Sarchie investigates a house where lights and candles repeatedly fail. The family had employed two painters in the basement, where most disturbances occurred. Sarchie discovers one painter, David Griggs, dead and decomposing. At Griggs's apartment, they find Alphonsus Painting business cards and photographs linking Griggs to Jane and Jimmy, as well as to a third Marine, Mick Santino—the painter at the zoo.

Mendoza believes Jane is possessed, explaining that human-created secondary evil can provide demons with access to the world. Sarchie remains sceptical until he begins experiencing strange sights and sounds himself. He discovers an pictograph of an owl and a recurring combination of Latin and ancient pictographs beneath painted walls at several locations. Reviewing Tratner's military footage, he finds the same message in a cave in Diyala. Mendoza identifies it as a bridge between Christian and pagan theology that could open a door for demons, and suggests Sarchie's intuitive "radar" makes him particularly susceptible.

Sarchie, Butler and Mendoza are attacked by Santino and Tratner. Mendoza subdues Tratner with his cross, but Santino kills Butler. Mendoza tells Sarchie that he must humble himself before God and confess his sins. Sarchie admits killing a child predator named Marvin after discovering him at the scene of a child's murder, and confesses that he has since felt a growing darkness within him. Mendoza absolves him.

Sarchie's daughter later sees her stuffed owl move and encounters Santino in the hallway. Santino calls Sarchie while abducting his wife and daughter. Sarchie returns home with backup, and Santino is arrested. Mendoza and Sarchie perform an exorcism, during which Sarchie learns the demon's name, Jungler. Using the name, Mendoza frees Santino, who reveals that Sarchie's family is being held in an Alphonsus Painting van at a storage facility.

Seven months later, Sarchie attends the baptism of his second child, Daniella Anne Sarchie. He proudly renounces Satan. A closing placard states that Sarchie retired from the police force and continued working with Father Mendoza.

== Cast ==
- Eric Bana as Ralph Sarchie, a New York City street cop who has put his faith in religion behind him, only to find himself entangled with the devil.
- Édgar Ramírez as Mendoza, the Spanish priest who teams with Ralph.
- Olivia Munn as Jennifer "Jen" Sarchie, Ralph's wife, who also has a tie to the case.
- Sean Harris as Mick Santino/Jungler, a Marine possessed by demons, who ends up targeting Ralph and his loved ones.
- Joel McHale as Butler, Ralph's partner, a tough, experienced, albeit sometimes a bit egotistical, cop.
- Chris Coy as Jimmy Tratner
- Dorian Missick as Gordon
- Lulu Wilson as Christina Sarchie, Ralph's daughter.
- Scott Johnsen as David Griggs
- Daniel Sauli as Salvatore
- Antoinette Lavecchia as Serafina
- Aidan Gemme as Mario
- Jenna Gavigan as Lucinda
- Oliver Wadsworth as Marvin
- Mike Houston as Nadler
- Olivia Horton as Jane Crenna
- Rhona Fox as Zookeeper
- Valentina Rendón as Claudia

== Production ==
On September 4, 2012, director Scott Derrickson signed on to direct Beware the Night, a paranormal cop thriller film he co-wrote with Paul Harris Boardman, with Screen Gems producing. On November 12, Jerry Bruckheimer signed on to produce the film with his Jerry Bruckheimer Films production company, which had begun developing a treatment of the Sarchie book with Derrickson and Boardman years earlier. David Ayer, Bryan Bertino and Bruce C. McKenna also worked on the screenplay before Bruckheimer went back to Derrickson and Boardman's script. Screen Gems set a January 16, 2015, release date and announced it would start filming on May 20, in The Bronx, New York City. On November 13, 2013, Sony Pictures changed the release date from January 2015 to July 2, 2014. On December 7, the film was retitled Deliver Us from Evil.

The film features a completely original plot by Derrickson and co-writer Paul Harris Boardman, while it draws on certain passages of Sarchie's book. Mendoza's explanation of primary and secondary evil is culled from the book's preface. Many of the details from the scene where Sarchie and Butler encounter the family living in one room of a haunted house are taken directly from the first chapter of the book.

=== Casting ===
Initially, Mark Wahlberg was set to star. On November 9, 2012 The Wrap posted that Eric Bana was in talks to join the film, playing the lead role as a New York cop. On April 9, 2013 Bana confirmed his role in the film as a Catholic cop, and Olivia Munn and Édgar Ramírez were set to co-star as the cop's wife and a priest respectively. On May 28, 2013 Joel McHale and Sean Harris also joined the film; McHale played Bana's partner, a tough and experienced cop. Dorian Missick joined cast on June 5 to play the role of the cop Gordon. Other cast members include Chris Coy, Rhona Fox, and Valentina Rendón.

=== Filming ===
Principal photography began on June 3, 2013 in New York City. After wrapping up filming in New York in the end of July, production moved to Abu Dhabi at the start of August 2013. Production filmed scenes at the Liwa Oasis desert in Abu Dhabi. According to Empire State Development Corporation, Deliver Us from Evil spent more than $19 million in New York state over the course of its 34-day shoot in New York City and on Long Island. The production paid $7 million to New York residents, hiring some 700 cast and crew as well as more than 400 extras.

== Marketing ==
On December 23, 2013, the first photo from the film was released. The film's first trailer was released on YouTube on March 7, 2014, followed by another international trailer on April 10. On May 14 another trailer was released.

== Release ==
The film was released on July 2, 2014 in 3,049 locations in the United States.

=== Home media ===
Deliver Us from Evil was released on DVD and Blu-ray on October 28, 2014. It was released on Netflix on February 2, 2018, but the film was removed from the streaming services on the same date. It was re-released on Netflix on September 1, 2019.

=== Critical reception ===
The film holds an approval rating of 29% on Rotten Tomatoes based on 133 reviews, with an average rating of 4.7/10. The critical consensus states: "Director Scott Derrickson continues to have a reliably firm grasp on creepy atmosphere, but Deliver Us from Evil's lack of original scares is reflected in its shopworn title." On Metacritic, the film has a weighted average score of 40 out of 100 based on 32 critics, indicating "mixed or average" reviews. Audiences polled by CinemaScore gave the film an average grade of "B-" on an A+ to F scale.

Writing for Variety, Andrew Barker's review called it "a professionally assembled genre mashup that's too silly to be scary, and a bit too dull to be a midnight-movie guilty pleasure". Critic Peter Keough of The Boston Globe wrote that the film is atmospheric but "the story soon devolves into variations of many movies we have seen before". Bilge Ebiri of New York Magazine called it "a thoroughly generic exorcism film" and concluded, "There are some half-decent scares ... But the film's real problem is that it's somehow both one-note and convoluted." Ben Sachs wrote in The Chicago Reader that Derrickson "demonstrates a knack for atmosphere but little sense of pacing". Of the film's atmosphere, Sachs wrote that "some sequences are effectively spooky" but "just as many feel uninspired". Moira Macdonald of The Seattle Times described it as "a pretty routine and occasionally silly demonic-possession flick, which distinguishes itself by making us wait so long for the exorcism that heads may be spinning in the audience as well". Macdonald added, "Some of it's shivery, but a lot of it is familiar from similar movies." Rafer Guzman of Newsday wrote, "Thanks to a fine cast, solid direction by Scott Derrickson and an idiosyncratic soundtrack by The Doors, the movie's mandatory cliches – Latin invocations, gurgling demons – are far more tolerable than usual." Bill Stamets in The Chicago Sun Times stated, "Director Scott Derrickson and his co-writer, Paul Harris Boardman, deliver a routine procedural with unremarkable frights".

=== Box office ===
Deliver Us from Evil did well at the box office. It had earned $2.8 million on its opening day. In its opening weekend, the film earned $9.5 million ranking at number four at the box office in the United States, behind the box office champion, Transformers: Age of Extinction.
