= Ralph Sarchie =

American police sergeant and demonologist

- Born: Ralph Sarchie; June 14, 1962 (age 64); New York City, New York, U.S.
- Occupations: Demonologist; investigator; author; police officer
- Known for: Paranormal investigation as a NYPD officer

Ralph Sarchie (born June 14, 1962) is an American paranormal investigator, retired NYPD sergeant and traditionalist Catholic demonologist. He has written a book, Beware the Night, which details many of his paranormal investigations; his accounts were later the basis of the film Deliver Us from Evil. Sarchie, in 2016, was featured in the film Hostage to the Devil, which detailed the life of Malachi Martin.

== Personal life and ministry ==
Sarchie served eighteen years as a NYPD sergeant in the South Bronx precinct, and was a member of the Street Crime Unit working undercover stopping in-progress crimes. Sarchie describes himself as a "committed Christian"; he is described as claiming to have a relic of the True Cross. Sarchie and his partner Mark Stabinski carry with them wooden Christian crosses and holy water when called to tackle "demonic infestation around the city." He assists in Christian exorcisms. His career as a Catholic Christian demonologist has included regularly meeting with and accompanying Ed and Lorraine Warren on their cases.

== Books ==
=== Beware the Night ===
In 2001, St. Martin's Press published Sarchie's book, Beware the Night (also titled Deliver Us from Evil), co-written by Lisa Collier Cool, about his experience as a NYPD police officer and demonologist.

Beware the Night synopsis:

"A seventeen-year NYPD veteran, Ralph Sarchie works out of the 46th Precinct in New York's south Bronx. But it is his other job that he calls "the Work": investigating cases of demonic possession and assisting in the exorcisms of humanity's most ancient--and most dangerous--foes. Now he discloses for the first time his investigation into incredible true crimes an inhuman evil that were never explained, solved, or understood except by Sarchie and his partner. Schooled in the rituals of exorcism, and an eyewitness to the reality of demonic possession, Ralph Sarchie has documented a riveting chronicle of the inexplicable that gives a new shape to the shadows in the dark.

In 'Beware the Night,' he takes readers into the very hierarchy of a hell on earth to expose the grisly rituals of a Palo Mayombe priest; a young girl whose innocence is violated by an incubus; a home invaded by the malevolent spirit of a supposedly murdered nineteenth-century bride; the dark side of a couple who were, literally, the neighbors from hell; and more. Ralph Sarchie's NYPD revelations are a powerful and disturbing documented link between the true-crime realities of life and the blood-chilling ice-grip of a supernatural terror."

== In other media ==
=== Deliver Us from Evil ===
On July 2, 2014, Screen Gems/Sony Pictures released a full-length motion picture, Deliver Us from Evil, inspired by Sarchie's accounts. The film followed Sarchie (Eric Bana) into the paranormal investigations he immersed himself in, all the while taking care of his family and working the midnight-to-8:00 A.M. shift as a cop. However, not many of the events recounted in the book actually remain in the film, as most have been changed and re-imagined by the scriptwriters/producers of the script/film. The film drew mixed reviews and was a success at the box office. The film grossed $30.5 million domestically in the United States and $87.9 million worldwide.

=== The Demon Files ===
Sarchie hosted the Destination America series The Demon Files which started airing from November 1, 2015.

== See also ==
- Exorcism in Christianity
