= Dirty John (TV series) =

2018 American true crime anthology series

- Season 1 intertitle
- Also known as: Dirty John: The John Meehan Story (season 1); Dirty John: The Betty Broderick Story or Dirty John: Betty – The Betty Broderick Story (season 2)
- Genre: True crime drama; Anthology
- Created by: Alexandra Cunningham
- Based on: Dirty John by Christopher Goffard
- Starring: Connie Britton; Eric Bana; Juno Temple; Julia Garner; Amanda Peet; Christian Slater; Rachel Keller
- Composer: Mark Mothersbaugh
- Country of origin: United States
- Original language: English
- No. of seasons: 2
- No. of episodes: 16

Production
- Executive producers: Connie Britton; Eric Bana; Christopher Argentieri; Mark Herzog; Christopher Cowen; Jeffrey Reiner; Richard Suckle; Charles Roven; Alexandra Cunningham; Jessica Rhoades
- Producers: Melinda Whitaker; Christopher Goffard; Nan Bernstein Freed; Jonathan Talbert
- Cinematography: Todd McMullen; Elie Smolkin
- Editors: Carole Kravetz Aykanian; Curtis Thurber; Daniel Downer III; Louise A. Innes; Iain Erskine; David Bilow; Crystal Lentz
- Camera setup: Single-camera
- Running time: 42–50 minutes
- Production companies: Atlas Entertainment; Los Angeles Times Studios; Pacesetter (season 2); Nutmegger; Universal Television; Universal Content Productions (season 2)

Original release
- Network: Bravo
- Release: November 25, 2018 – January 13, 2019
- Network: USA Network
- Release: May 31 – July 14, 2020

Dirty John (also known as Dirty John: The John Meehan Story in its first season) is an American true crime anthology television series, based on the podcast of the same name by Christopher Goffard, that premiered on November 25, 2018, on Bravo. Outside the United States, it was made available through Netflix on February 14, 2019. The series was created by Alexandra Cunningham also an executive producer alongside Richard Suckle, Charles Roven, Mark Herzog, Christopher G. Cowen, and Chris Argentieri. The series was initially given an order for two seasons. In May 2019, it was announced that the series will be moving from Bravo to USA Network, ahead of the premiere of the second season. The second season is titled Dirty John: The Betty Broderick Story, or alternatively marketed as Dirty John: Betty – The Betty Broderick Story. A trailer for the season was released on March 25, 2020, featuring Christian Slater and Amanda Peet in the role of Betty Broderick. In April 2020, it was announced that the second season would premiere on June 2, 2020, with a sneak peek of the first episode of the second season airing on May 31, 2020.

The first season was met with a mixed to positive response from critics upon its premiere and managed to garner recognition at various award ceremonies. Connie Britton earned nominations for awards including the Golden Globe Award for Best Actress – Miniseries or Television Film and the Critics' Choice Television Award for Best Actress in a Limited Series or Movie Made for Television and Garner earned a nomination for the Critics' Choice Television Award for Best Supporting Actress in a Limited Series or Movie Made for Television.

== Premise ==
Season 1 of tells the story of "how a romance with the charismatic John Meehan spiraled into secrets, denial, manipulation, and ultimately, survival – with horrific consequences for an entire family."

Season 2 follows the breakdown of Betty Broderick's marriage to childhood sweetheart Dan Broderick and the devastating effects of the emotional toll it took on Betty.

== Cast and characters ==
=== Season 1 ===
==== Main ====
- Connie Britton as Debra Newell, a wealthy, successful interior designer and owner of her own design company Madeira, who is looking for love on various dating websites after four failed marriages
- Eric Bana as John Meehan
- Juno Temple as Veronica Newell, Debra's older daughter
- Julia Garner as Terra Newell, Debra's younger daughter

==== Recurring ====
- Jean Smart as Arlane Hart, Debra's mother
- Keiko Agena as Nancy, Debra's colleague
- Jake Abel as Trey Newell, Debra's son and Veronica's and Terra's older brother.
- Kevin Zegers as Toby Sellers, Debra's nephew
- Jeff Perry as Michael O'Neil
- Vanessa Martínez as Celia
- Judy Reyes as Verga, a private investigator
- Joe Tippett as Bobby
- Sprague Grayden as Tonia Sells, John's first wife
- Lindsey Kraft as Ruth
- John Getz as Dwight
- Joelle Carter as Denise Meehan-Shepard, John's sister

=== Season 2 ===
==== Main ====
- Amanda Peet as Betty Broderick
- Christian Slater as Dan Broderick
- Rachel Keller as Linda Kolkena

==== Recurring ====
- Lily Donoghue as Tracy Broderick, Betty and Dan's eldest daughter
- Missi Pyle as Karen Kintner
- Emily Bergl as Marie Stewart
- Holley Fain as Evelyn Crowley
- Lena Georgas as Janet Ravis
- Tiera Skovbye as Young Betty Broderick
- Chris Mason as Young Dan Broderick
- Cameron Crovetti as Ryan Broderick, Betty and Dan's older son
- Miles Emmons as Anthony Broderick, Betty and Dan's youngest son
- Anna Jacoby-Heron as Jenny Broderick, Betty and Dan's younger teenage daughter
- Joelle Carter as Yvonne Newsome
- Sprague Grayden as Samantha, HALT member

== Episodes ==
=== Series overview ===
Season	Title	Episodes	Originally released		
Season	Title	Episodes	First released	Last released	Network
1	The John Meehan Story	8	November 15, 2018	January 13, 2019	Bravo
2	The Betty Broderick Story	8	May 31, 2020	July 14, 2020	USA Network

=== Season 1: The John Meehan Story (2018–19) ===
No. overall	No. in season	Title	Directed by	Written by	Original release date	U.S. viewers (millions)
1	1	"Approachable Dreams"	Jeffrey Reiner	Alexandra Cunningham	November 15, 2018 (Note: Episode one was released early on November 15, 2018, through Bravo's streaming application before its official television timeslot premiere on November 25, 2018.)	1.22
2	2	"Red Flags and Parades"	Jeffrey Reiner	Evan Wright	December 2, 2018	1.24
3	3	"Remember It Was Me"	Jeffrey Reiner	Diana Son	December 9, 2018	1.28
4	4	"Shrapnel"	Jeffrey Reiner	Alexandra Cunningham & Sinead Daly	December 16, 2018	1.14
5	5	"Lord High Executioner"	Jeffrey Reiner	Christopher Goffard	December 23, 2018	1.04
6	6	"One Shoe"	Jeffrey Reiner	Alexandra Cunningham & Kevin J. Hynes	December 30, 2018	1.37
7	7	"Chivalry"	Jeffrey Reiner	Alexandra Cunningham & Lex Edness	January 6, 2019	1.49
8	8	"This Young Woman Fought Like Hell"	Jeffrey Reiner	Alexandra Cunningham	January 13, 2019	1.84

=== Season 2: The Betty Broderick Story (2020) ===
No. overall	No. in season	Title	Directed by	Written by	Original release date	U.S. viewers (millions)
9	1	"No Fault"	Maggie Kiley	Alexandra Cunningham	May 31, 2020 (Note: The episode originally aired as a "sneak peek" on May 31, 2020 and was later re-aired for a special time official premiere on June 2, 2020 which received 1.09 viewers.)	0.55
10	2	"The Turtle and the Alligator"	Meera Menon	Stacy A. Littlejohn	June 2, 2020	0.89
11	3	"Marriage Encounter"	Kat Candler	Juliet Lashinsky-Revene	June 9, 2020	0.91
12	4	"More to It Than Fun"	Maggie Kiley	Alexandra Cunningham & Katherine B. McKenna	June 16, 2020	0.81
13	5	"Scream Therapy"	Maggie Kiley	Aaron Carew	June 23, 2020	0.80
14	6	"The Twelfth of Never"	Shannon Kohli	Kevin J. Hynes	June 30, 2020	0.67
15	7	"The Shillelagh"	Alexandra Cunningham	Lex Edness	July 7, 2020	0.75
16	8	"Perception is Reality"	Maggie Kiley	Alexandra Cunningham	July 14, 2020	0.84

== Production ==
=== Development ===
On January 28, 2018, it was announced that Bravo had given a series order to Dirty John, a new television series created and written by Alexandra Cunningham. The series order was reportedly for two seasons in which Cunningham would executive produce alongside Richard Suckle, Charles Roven, Mark Herzog, Christopher G. Cowen and Christopher Argentieri. Production companies involved in the series were slated to include Universal Cable Productions, Los Angeles Times Studios, and Atlas Entertainment. On October 8, 2018, it was announced that the series would premiere on November 25, 2018. On May 17, 2019, it was reported that the series will be moving from Bravo to USA Network, ahead of the premiere of the second season. On September 9, 2019, it was reported that series is an anthology series and the second season is titled Dirty John: The Betty Broderick Story which premiered on June 2, 2020.

=== Casting ===
On March 26, 2018, it was announced that Connie Britton had been cast in the series' lead role. On April 3, 2018, it was reported that Eric Bana had joined the main cast as the eponymous John Meehan. On June 14, 2018, it was announced that Jean Smart had been cast in a recurring role. In July 2018, it was reported that Juno Temple, Julia Garner, Kevin Zegers, Keiko Agena, John Karna, Sprague Grayden, Cliff Chamberlain, Jake Abel, and David Barrera had joined the cast. Temple and Garner were cast in starring roles and Zegers, Abel, and Barrera were set to appear in a recurring capacity. On August 16, 2018, it was announced that Lindsey Kraft had been cast in a guest starring role. On September 9, 2019, Amanda Peet and Christian Slater were cast in starring roles for the second season. On October 18, 2019, Missi Pyle and Holley Fain were cast in recurring roles for the second season. On November 8, 2019, Rachel Keller joined the main cast while Emily Bergl, Lena Georgas, Tiera Skovbye, and Chris Mason joined the cast in recurring capacities.

== Release ==
=== Marketing ===
On August 24, 2018, a "first look" still image from the series was released featuring Connie Britton and Eric Bana as Debra Newell and John Meehan. On September 17, 2018, a teaser trailer for the series was released. On October 8, 2018, the official trailer for the series was released. On December 20, 2018, an exclusive preview clip from the series was released.

=== Premiere ===
On November 13, 2018, the series held its official premiere at NeueHouse Hollywood in Los Angeles, California featuring a screening of the series. A red carpet arrival was originally scheduled to take place before the screening but it was canceled out of respect for the victims of the Woolsey Fire which was still burning in the Los Angeles and Ventura counties. The first season became available to stream on Netflix worldwide on February 14, 2019 and later added to Netflix in the US in November 2019. Dirty John premiered in the United Kingdom on April 10, 2021 on 5Star.

== Dirty John: The Dirty Truth ==
On January 28, 2018, it was announced that Oxygen had ordered a companion docuseries to air alongside the main series which would investigate the real John Meehan through the eyes of those he deceived. The project was set to be executive produced by Mark Herzog and Christopher G. Cowen with production companies including Herzog & Co. and Los Angeles Times Studios. On November 14, 2018, it was reported that the docuseries was actually a documentary, that it had been titled Dirty John: The Dirty Truth, and that it would air in January 2019. On December 16, 2018, it was announced that documentary would premiere on January 14, 2019.

== Reception ==
=== Critical response ===
The series has been met with a mixed to positive response from critics upon its premiere. On the review aggregation website Rotten Tomatoes, the first season holds a 71% approval rating with an average rating of 5.51/10 based on 34 reviews. The website's critical consensus reads, "Dirty John might not live up to the thrills of its source material, but Connie Britton puts on a clinic with her interpretation of true crime treachery." Metacritic, which uses a weighted average, assigned the first season a score of 58 out of 100 based on 18 critics, indicating "mixed or average reviews".

In a positive review, Entertainment Weekly's Kristen Baldwin gave the first season a grade of "A−" and directed particular praise at the performances in it describing Britton as "perfectly cast" and saying of Bana that he "may benefit the most from Dirty John; as Meehan, the actor pivots from charming to chilling and back again with astonishing ease." In a similarly favorable analysis, the Los Angeles Times's Mike Mack commended the first season declaring, "Glossy and well-acted, its transfer from your daily commute's most suspenseful listening stretch ever to serviceable wine-and-laundry-folding companion show feels, all in all, a smooth one."

In a more mixed assessment, RogerEbert.com's Brian Tallerico gave the first season qualified praise saying, "Dirty John is very entertaining, though it's not without faults. It doesn't dig very deep, or present Debra's daughters as full characters (their main roles are to look confused or upset, which is a waste of big talent), and its storytelling can be a little convoluted. But it never claims to be high art." In an outright negative appraisal, TVLine's Dave Nemetz gave the first season a grade of "D" and criticized it saying, "Britton and her talented co-stars are wasted here on a warmed-over Lifetime movie masquerading as a prestige TV miniseries — one that's, sadly, not even trashy enough to qualify as a guilty pleasure." In another unfavorable evaluation, IndieWire's Ben Travers was very critical of the series' first season giving it a grade of "C−" and saying that, "Decidedly not ambitious 'prestige' television, the first three episodes make perfectly clear this isn't a nuanced series, or one interested in exploring abuse or manipulation in serious fashion. It's trying to be a juicy nighttime soap that uses the 'true story' tag to drive viewers' mouths further and further agape."

Review aggregator Rotten Tomatoes reported an approval rating of 90% based on 20 reviews, with an average rating of 7.15/10 for the second season. The website's critics consensus states, "Although The Betty Broderick Story's sensational story is at times scattershot, Amanda Peet's incredible embodiment of a woman scorned is a sight to behold." Metacritic gave the second season a score of 73 out of 100 based on 12 critics, indicating "generally favorable reviews".

=== Ratings ===
==== Season 1 ====
Viewership and ratings per episode of Dirty John
No.	Title	Air date	Rating (18–49)	Viewers (millions)	DVR (18–49)	DVR viewers (millions)	Total (18–49)	Total viewers (millions)
1	"Approachable Dreams"	November 25, 2018	0.4	1.22	0.3	0.86	0.7	2.08
2	"Red Flags and Parades"	December 2, 2018	0.4	1.24	0.4	1.26	0.8	2.50
3	"Remember It Was Me"	December 9, 2018	0.4	1.28	0.4	1.39	0.8	2.67
4	"Shrapnel"	December 16, 2018	0.3	1.14	0.5	1.55	0.8	2.69
5	"Lord High Executioner"	December 23, 2018	0.3	1.04	0.4	1.40	0.7	2.44
6	"One Shoe"	December 30, 2018	0.4	1.37	0.5	1.54	0.9	2.91
7	"Chivalry"	January 6, 2019	0.4	1.49	0.5	1.46	0.9	2.95
8	"This Young Woman Fought Like Hell"	January 13, 2019	0.6	1.84	0.4	1.41	1.0	3.25

==== Season 2 ====
Viewership and ratings per episode of Dirty John
No.	Title	Air date	Rating (18–49)	Viewers (millions)	DVR (18–49)	DVR viewers (millions)	Total (18–49)	Total viewers (millions)
1	"No Fault"	May 31, 2020	0.1	0.55	—N/a	—N/a	—N/a	—N/a
2	"The Turtle and the Alligator"	June 2, 2020	0.2	0.89	0.2	0.79	0.4	1.68
3	"Marriage Encounter"	June 9, 2020	0.2	0.91	0.3	0.94	0.5	1.84
4	"More to It Than Fun"	June 16, 2020	0.2	0.81	0.2	0.95	0.4	1.76
5	"Scream Therapy"	June 23, 2020	0.2	0.80	0.2	0.92	0.4	1.71
6	"The Twelfth of Never"	June 30, 2020	0.1	0.67	0.3	0.97	0.4	1.64
7	"The Shillelagh"	July 7, 2020	0.2	0.75	0.2	0.83	0.4	1.58
8	"Perception is Reality"	July 14, 2020	0.2	0.84	0.2	0.81	0.4	1.65

=== Awards and nominations ===
Year	Award	Category	Nominee(s)	Result	Ref.
2019	Golden Globe Awards	Best Actress – Miniseries or Television Film	Connie Britton	Nominated	
2019	Critics' Choice Television Awards	Best Actress in a Limited Series or Movie Made for Television	Connie Britton	Nominated	
2019	Critics' Choice Television Awards	Best Supporting Actress in a Limited Series or Movie Made for Television	Julia Garner	Nominated	
2021	Writers Guild of America Awards	Long Form – Original	Aaron Carew, Alexandra Cunningham, Lex Edness, Kevin J. Hynes, Juliet Lashinsky-Revene, Stacy A. Littlejohn and Katherine B. McKenna	Nominated	
