= Prime Suspect (American TV series) =

- Genre: Police procedural Drama
- Created by: Lynda La Plante
- Inspired by: Prime Suspect by Lynda La Plante
- Developed by: Alexandra Cunningham
- Starring: Maria Bello; Brian O'Byrne; Kirk Acevedo; Peter Gerety; Tim Griffin; Damon Gupton; Kenny Johnson; Elizabeth Rodriguez; Aidan Quinn
- Composers: Wendy Melvoin; Lisa Coleman
- Country of origin: United States
- Original language: English
- No. of seasons: 1
- No. of episodes: 13

Production
- Executive producers: John McNamara; Alexandra Cunningham; Peter Berg; Sarah Aubrey; Julie Meldal-Johnson; Paul Buccieri; Lynda La Plante
- Producers: Alexandra Cunningham; Nan Bernstein Freed
- Cinematography: Todd McMullen
- Camera setup: Multi-camera film
- Production companies: ITV Studios America; Film 44; Universal Television; Open 4 Business Productions

Original release
- Network: NBC
- Release: September 22, 2011 – January 22, 2012

Prime Suspect is an American police procedural drama television series that aired on NBC from September 22, 2011, to January 22, 2012. It stars Maria Bello as Detective Jane Timoney. The series was a "re-imagining" of the original British series Prime Suspect. The series was created by Lynda La Plante and developed by Alexandra Cunningham, who also serves as executive producer and writer. Peter Berg serves as executive producer and director. Sarah Aubrey, Julie Meldal-Johnson, Paul Buccieri, Lynda La Plante, and John McNamara all serve as executive producers. The series is produced by Universal Television, ITV Studios America, and Film 44.

On November 14, 2011, NBC announced it would replace Prime Suspect in the Thursday night line-up with The Firm, beginning January 12, 2012. The final two produced episodes were broadcast by NBC on Sunday, January 22, 2012. The Firm also struggled in the time slot, and was moved within four weeks to a different time slot and replaced by another new series, Awake; Awake was another ratings failure, and all three series were cancelled that season.

== Synopsis ==
Produced by Peter Berg and Alexandra Cunningham, the crime drama Prime Suspect takes place within a New York City Police Department homicide squad. The series stars Maria Bello as NYPD homicide detective Jane Timoney, an outsider who has just transferred to a new squad where her new colleagues already dislike her. Jane is confident and focused, but also rude, abrupt and occasionally reckless. She has her vices, and rumors about how she got the job follow her everywhere.

== Cast and characters ==
- Maria Bello as Det. Jane Timoney
- Brían F. O'Byrne as Det. Reg Duffy
- Kirk Acevedo as Det. Luisito Calderon
- Peter Gerety as Desmond Timoney, Jane's father.
- Tim Griffin as Det. Augie Blando
- Damon Gupton as Det. Evrard Velerio
- Elizabeth Rodriguez appeared as Det. Carolina Rivera (four episodes)
- Joe Nieves as Det. Eddie Gautier (pilot only)
- Kenny Johnson as Matt Webb
- Aidan Quinn as Lt. Kevin Sweeney

== Development and production ==
An American remake of the UK series was previously ordered by NBC in September 2009 as part of a two-year, three pilot deal with ITV Studios. Hank Steinberg, the creator of the CBS Without a Trace series, was set to write and executive produce the two-hour pilot. In early 2010, Erwin Stoff and Paul Buccieri were to also serve as executive producers—for ITV Studios and Universal Media Studios—and Mick Jackson was on board to direct. By late February, the project was put on hold because reportedly an actress could not be found to play the lead character. In July 2010, Universal Media Studios signed a new deal with Film 44, the production company of Peter Berg and Sarah Aubrey. As part of the agreement, they took over the development of Prime Suspect. "We are proud to continue our productive creative relationship with Peter and Sarah in developing Prime Suspect, among others… They have immense talent and passion".

In early 2011, NBC gave the green light to produce a pilot script. In late May, NBC announced that Prime Suspect would premiere on Thursday September 22, 2011.

It was announced in early August that Maria Bello would star as the main character of Det. Jane Timoney. The series was filmed in Los Angeles although it is set in New York City.

== Episodes ==
No.	Title	Directed by	Written by	Original release date	Prod. code	U.S. viewers (millions)
1	"Pilot"	Peter Berg	Alexandra Cunningham	September 22, 2011	101	6.05
Jane gets a rough start working on a New York homicide squad when she questions the work of her new colleagues in the case of a woman who is raped and murdered in front of her kids. Jane wants in on the investigation, but they rebuff her. When the lead detective on the case dies of a heart attack, Jane is appointed as his replacement, much to their chagrin. Jane manages to find a unique angle to solve the crime.
2	"Carnivorous Sheep"	Jonas Pate	Teleplay by : Alexandra Cunningham	September 29, 2011	102	5.69
Jane is called into Duffy's homicide and kidnapping case after Sweeney calls for all hands on deck. Duffy gets irritated with Jane after she suggests talking with the deceased woman's employees.
3	"Bitch"	Michael Waxman	Liz Heldens	October 6, 2011	103	5.04
Jane's father's bar is robbed while she's helping out at the establishment. Calderon and Jane are assigned to the murder of a woman found in a dumpster. In other events, Jane gives the female cop (Elizabeth Rodriguez) investigating the bar robbery the cold shoulder. After solving the case, Jane finally starts to get some of the recognition she deserves.
4	"Great Guy, Yet: Dead"	Jonas Pate	John McNamara	October 13, 2011	104	4.60
When a good-looking stockbroker is killed mysteriously, Jane automatically suspects his wife. Meanwhile, Jane enlists the help of a hypnotist to fight her addiction to smoking and, incidentally, to help solve the crime. Elsewhere, Matt is furious when his ex-wife suggests Jane shouldn't attend their son's birthday party.
5	"Regrets, I've Had a Few"	Stephen Williams	Randy Huggins	October 27, 2011	105	4.03
While Jane investigates the death of a woman in the park, Duffy and Evrard look for the victim's stepfather. Jane and her father celebrate her parents' 45th wedding anniversary by remembering Jane's mother.
6	"Shame"	Jonas Pate	Tyler Bensinger	November 3, 2011	106	4.51
A businessman in town for a hardware convention is found dead in his hotel room. The prostitute he hired the previous evening is the suspect. Within hours, the same suspect strikes again, only this time her victim—a naval commander—survives. Meanwhile, Jane is distressed that her past relationship has become department gossip.
7	"Wednesday's Child"	Jonas Pate	Nichole Beattie	November 10, 2011	107	4.86
A toddler dies at day care after suffering head trauma.
8	"Underwater"	Stephen Williams	Roberto Patino	November 17, 2011	108	4.34
A young girl finds her parents dead, and becomes the target of the murder's associates.
9	"Gone to Pieces"	Laura Innes	Ron Fitzgerald	December 1, 2011	109	4.69
A hit and run victim is linked to a porn producer.
10	"A Gorgeous Mosaic"	Gwyneth Horder-Payton	Kevin J. Hynes	December 15, 2011	110	3.70
A jewelry merchant is murdered, and an Irish gangster is implicated.
11	"The Great Wall of Silence"	Michael Waxman	Mike Sheehan	December 22, 2011	111	4.44
A murder victim is found in a restaurant kitchen in Chinatown.
12	"Ain't No Sunshine"	Roxann Dawson	Eli Bauman	January 21, 2012 (Global); January 22, 2012 (NBC)	112	4.35
A 15-year-old girl is found in the garbage chute of her building. A wealthy woman suddenly dies in her bathroom. When an entry wound is found her 'gigolo' husband is suspected of shooting her but the evidence doesn't quite fit the theory.
13	"Stuck in the Middle with You"	Bart Freundlich	Alexandra Cunningham	January 22, 2012	113	3.65
An imprisoned drug dealer tries to unravel a pending court case by killing the witnesses and detective who will testify against him. After thugs kill one witness, the homicide squad learns Detective Duffy is a target.

== Ratings ==
No.	Title	Air Date	18–49 Rating	U.S. Viewers (in millions)	Timeslot Rank	Reference
1	"Pilot"	September 22, 2011	1.8	6.05	#3	
2	"Carnivorous Sheep"	September 29, 2011	1.5	5.69	#3	
3	"Bitch"	October 6, 2011	1.5	5.04	#3	
4	"Great Guy, Yet Dead"	October 13, 2011	1.3	4.50	#3	
5	"Regrets, I've Had a Few"	October 27, 2011	1.1	4.03	#3	
6	"Shame"	November 3, 2011	1.2	4.51	#3	
7	"Wednesday's Child"	November 10, 2011	1.3	4.86	#3	
8	"Underwater"	November 17, 2011	1.1	4.39	#2	
9	"Gone to Pieces"	December 1, 2011	1.3	4.69	#2	
10	"A Gorgeous Mosaic"	December 15, 2011	0.9	3.70	#2	
11	"The Great Wall of Silence"	December 22, 2011	1.0	4.44	#2	
12	"Ain't No Sunshine"	January 22, 2012	0.8	4.31	#3	
13	"Stuck in the Middle with You"	January 22, 2012	0.7	3.65	#3	

== Reception ==
The series premiere was viewed by 6.05 million viewers with a 1.8 rating in the 18–49 demographic. The series has received generally positive reviews from critics and viewers. The series received 66/100 based upon 26 reviews on the website Metacritic indicating the series as generally favourable. Most critics found Maria Bello's performance the strongest factor of the series praising her excellent and intriguing portrayal of Det. Jane Timoney. Mo Fathelbab of BuzzFocus said, "I'm going to go out on a limb and say that the American version of Prime Suspect is my favorite new hour-long show on network television. It may very well be the best new show premiering this fall. It's a smart, un-condescending cop show that is anchored by a fantastic performance by Maria Bello". Eric Blattberg said, "What makes Prime Suspect compelling enough to see where this show goes is its remarkable cast. This show is not actually bad at all; it's an enjoyable hour, but it's going to need a lot of work to avoid being lost in the shuffle amongst other established police shows. Not to mention the fact that it's up against Thursday heavyweights".

On October 4, 2011, NBC announced that the show's first three episodes would be rerun on Monday nights for the month of October, following the cancellation of The Playboy Club.

== International distribution ==
Country	Channel	Premiere date
Australia	Nine Network	28 September 2011
Canada (English)	Global TV	22 September 2011
Canada / Quebec (French)	Séries+ (As Suspect No 1)	May 29, 2012
New Zealand	TV One	Autumn 2011
Italy	Fox Crime	17 May 2012
United Kingdom	Universal Channel	18 June 2012
