= Out of Bounds (Eric Bana album) =

Studio album by Eric Bana
- Released: 1994 (Australia)
- Genre: Comedy
- Length: 60:00
- Label: Lotus Records
- Producer: Anthony Dale; Vince Delitto

Out of Bounds is a comedy album released by Australian actor and comedian Eric Bana in 1994.

== Cover art ==
The album cover features a doctored photo of Bana streaking through a crowded Australian rules football stadium. He is reaching for the ball and his buttocks are covered with the message "contents may offend". The scene was created digitally by Melbourne-based photographer James Lauritz, with the overlap of two photos. According to the CD sleeve, Bana's costumes in the cover photo were designed by "God". An alternative cover features Bana dressed as two of the characters which he portrays in the album.

== Track listing ==
1. "Pre Match"
2. "C'mon Rexy"
3. "Pre Match 2"
4. "1st Quarter"
5. "Quarter Time"
6. "2nd Quarter"
7. "Half Time"
8. "3rd Quarter"
9. "3 Quarter Time"
10. "Final Quarter"
11. "Out of Bounds"
12. "Final Crossing"
