= Amy Doneen =

American doctor of nursing practice

- Born: Amy Lynn Hubbard; 1969 (age 56–57)
- Education: Spokane Community College (ADN); Gonzaga University (DNP)
- Known for: BaleDoneen Method

Amy Lynn Doneen (born in 1969) is an American doctor of nursing practice (DNP) and co-founder of the BaleDoneen Method for the prevention and treatment of heart attack, stroke and type 2 diabetes, and for treatment after one of these medical events.

She holds professorships at Washington State University School of Medicine, University of Kentucky College of Dentistry and Texas Tech University Health Science Center.

== Early life and nursing education ==
Doneen received her associate degree in nursing (ADN) and registered nurse (RN) degrees from Spokane Community College. After graduating from nursing school, she worked for 10 years as a registered nurse. She subsequently received her Bachelor of Nursing Science (BSN), Master of Science in Nursing (MSN) and Advanced Registered Nurse Practitioner (ARNP) degrees from Gonzaga University. In 2014, she became the first graduate of Gonzaga's Doctor of Nursing Practice (DNP) Program.

== Origin of the BaleDoneen Method ==
In 2000, while at Gonzaga, Doneen met Bradley Field Bale, then a family physician in Spokane whose practice focused on early detection and treatment of cardiovascular disease.

Intrigued by one of the imaging technologies Bale was using to screen patients for arterial disease, called electron beam tomography (EBT), and wrote her dissertation on “The Relationship between Electron Beam Computed Tomography Calcium Scores and established Clinical and Serologic Risk Factors for Coronary Artery Disease,” was published in 2003.

In 2004, she and Bale cofounded the BaleDoneen Method.

== Publications ==
Doneen, Bradley Bale and Lisa Collier Cool published the 2013 book, Bale, Bradley; Doneen, Amy; Cool, Lisa Collier (April 15, 2013). Beat the Heart Attack Gene: The Revolutionary Plan to Prevent Heart Disease, Stroke and Diabetes. Wiley. ISBN 9781118454299. v

Postgraduate Medical Journal titled, “High-risk periodontal pathogens contribute to the pathogenesis of atherosclerosis. A 2012 scientific statement from the American Heart Association, however, states that while observational studies support an association between periodontal disease and heart disease, independent of known confounders, these studies "do not support a causal relationship."

== Nursing career ==
Since 2005, Doneen has been the owner and medical director of the Heart Attack & Stroke Prevention Center in Spokane, Washington, a private clinical practice that treats patients using the BaleDoneen Method.

In 2015, Doneen and Bale launched a nonprofit organization, the Institute of Arteriology dedicated to advancing “arteriology,” the study of arteries, and conducting research. One of its objectives, in collaboration with Johns Hopkins School of Medicine, “is the establishment of a longitudinal, interventional registry of patients who have been screened to assess their cardiovascular disease risk by evaluating their subclinical arterial disease state and then treated to optimize arterial health.”

== Personal life ==
Born Amy Lynn Hubbard to American parents in Heidelberg, Germany, she married Daren Doneen in 1994. The couple has three children.
