= Dirty John =

Investigative journalism podcast

- Genre: Investigative; Serialized audio narrative; True Crime
- Language: English

Cast and voices
- Hosted by: Christopher Goffard

Production
- Production: Karen Lowe; Jeffrey Glazer; Hernan Lopez

Technical specifications
- Audio format: Podcast (via streaming or downloadable MP3)

Publication
- No. of seasons: 2
- No. of episodes: 16
- Original release: October 2 – October 8, 2017

Related
- Adaptations: Dirty John (TV series)
- Website: Dirty John - Wondery

Dirty John is a true crime podcast based on the life of serial abuser and nurse John Michael Meehan (1959-2016). The podcast is hosted by Christopher Goffard and was created by Wondery and the Los Angeles Times. The first two chapters were launched on October 2, 2017; the following four chapters were released over the following days. The podcast was downloaded over 10 million times within six weeks of release.

== Title ==
The title Dirty John is one of the nicknames John Meehan's classmates gave him during his time at the University of Dayton. Other nicknames from this time included "Filthy John" and "Filthy". The exact origin of these nicknames is never divulged during the podcast.

== Synopsis ==
Dirty John is a true crime story focusing on the life and exploits of John Meehan. Los Angeles Times journalist Christopher Goffard first heard of Meehan when he learned that the police were investigating a possible murder in Newport Beach. Upon investigating, Goffard discovered a bizarre web of deceit and abuse.

The main focus of the story is Meehan's relationship with businesswoman Debra Newell, whom he met via an Internet dating site and married within months, as well as her immediate and extended family. The podcast deals with themes of abuse and manipulation, as well as the behaviors of those being abused.

Meehan was killed by Newell's younger daughter, Terra, who acted in self-defense when he tried to abduct her on the rooftop parking lot of her apartment building on August 20, 2016. He was hospitalized and died on August 24. The story was covered by Dateline NBC on January 12, 2018 and included interviews with Goffard.

== Individuals involved ==
- Christopher Goffard – the host, a journalist and 2007 Pulitzer Prize finalist in feature writing
- John Meehan – the titular "Dirty John"
- Debra Newell – a successful businesswoman looking for love online
- Jacquelyn Newell – Debra's older daughter
- Terra Newell – Debra's younger daughter
- Cash – Terra's dog, a miniature Australian Shepherd
- Shad Vickers – Debra's nephew, the son of her late sister Cindi
- John Dzialo – Attorney
- Tonia Sells – John's first wife

== Episodes ==
No.	Title	Running time (in minutes)	Original release date
I	"The Real Thing"	40:33	October 2, 2017
Debra Newell, an interior designer in Southern California, meets John Meehan on an over-50 dating site. His profile looks exciting: anesthesiologist, divorced, Christian. She falls in love fast. But her children dislike him and warn her that his stories don't add up.
II	"Newlyweds"	36:09	October 2, 2017
After an intruder appears in John and Debra's living room, John insists that they install security cameras. Debra begins to wonder whether he is spying on her. Her nephew, Shad, looks into John's background and confronts him with what he finds. Debra's vision of an idyllic marriage is shattered when she discovers a stash of paperwork in John's home office.
III	"Filthy"	46:43	October 4, 2017
Debra grapples with the question, "Who did I marry?" The story of John's mysterious past unfolds through the eyes of his sisters, his law school housemate, his ex-wife, and an Ohio cop who hunted him. The origins of John's nickname are revealed. Bed-ridden in an Orange County hospital, he pleads with Debra to take him back.
IV	"Forgiveness"	42:20	October 5, 2017
Debra is in hiding, living out of hotels and disguising herself with a wig. She fears she will meet the fate of her sister Cindi, who was killed by her husband as she tried to escape a bad marriage. John has explanations for the accusations against him. He weeps and apologizes. Three decades earlier, that had helped Cindi's killer walk out of prison.
V	"Escape"	47:06	October 7, 2017
John finds a lawyer and plots to unleash a blizzard of lawsuits against his enemies, with the aim of proving to Debra that he is the victim, in case after case. The lawyer believes Debra's life is in danger. As her painful isolation from her family deepens, Debra secretly plans her escape from the marriage.
VI	"Terra"	40:35	October 8, 2017
Debra's daughters, Jacquelyn and Terra, suspect John has been watching them. But, when Jacquelyn tells Debra that John is in town, her mother believes she is mistaken. Jacquelyn warns Terra to carry her pocket knife and to look out for cars matching John's rental. But Terra is preoccupied by a country music concert, and Jacquelyn's rough description has her watching for the wrong car.

== Reception ==
Dirty John proved to be very popular with audiences, and spent over three weeks at the top of the US iTunes podcast charts, whilst also topping the charts in Australia, Canada, and the UK and was downloaded over five million times in three weeks. It was downloaded over 10 million times within six weeks of release, and as of November 23, 2017, is the sixth most downloaded podcasts on iTunes America.

Critical reception was also positive, with the NME calling it "the best true crime podcast since Serial", while The Guardian listed Dirty John as their podcast pick of the week. Dirty John also received positive reviews from Mashable, The New Yorker, Rolling Stone and The Daily Telegraph amongst others.

Vulture.com, meanwhile, praised the story as "stunning" but questioned the necessity of using a podcast as a way to share the story.

== Ethical concerns ==
In the March 13, 2025 episode of the podcast The Dream, Terra Newell discussed with host Jane Marie her experiences with the Dirty John podcast and Dirty John TV series in the wake of the Los Angeles Times series.

According to Newell, while no one from the L.A. Times mentioned doing a podcast when her family first agreed to be interviewed, it seemed clear afterwards that a podcast had been planned well ahead of time. Jean Marie stated that her production company was one of several that were approached to produce the podcast months before the Newells even consented to be interviewed.

Newell stated that Goffard told her that he was making audio recordings of his interviews with the family for his notes, and that the audio was used in the podcast without their consent. She also described the ways in which TV companies and producers took advantage of her professionally, emotionally, and financially during and after the production of the TV series. She stated that while she was paid $100,000 in compensation for use of her story in the TV series, this was far less than what the production companies have made on the hit show.

In response to a request for comment by The Dream, Goffard referred the show to a Los Angeles Times spokesperson, who in turn responded that there was professional audio equipment present when Goffard interviewed Newell, such as a Tascam audio recorder and a boom mic. The spokesperson also stated that since the paper's use of the audio material was for editorial purposes, it hadn't required signed releases.

== Television adaptation ==
A limited series based on the podcast debuted on Bravo on November 25, 2018. It was created, produced, and written by Alexandra Cunningham, and stars Connie Britton and Eric Bana.

== See also ==
- List of American crime podcasts
