= Michael McGrath =

Michael, Mick, or Mike McGrath may refer to:

== Public officials ==
- Michael McGrath (American politician) (1942–2021), Minnesota State Treasurer
- Mike McGrath (judge) (born 1947), American jurist; Montana Supreme Court chief justice since 2009
- Michael McGrath (Irish politician) (born 1976), Irish European commissioner, former Fianna Fáil member of Dáil Éireann

== Sportspeople ==
- Mike McGrath (bowler) (1946–2017), American bowler
- Michael McGrath (hurler) (born 1963), Irish right wing-forward
- Mike McGrath, American coach in 2019 for Chicago Maroons men's basketball
- Mick McGrath (footballer) (born 1936), Irish former footballer
- Mick McGrath (triple jumper) (born 1947), Australian former triple jumper
- Mick McGrath (rugby union) (born 1991), Irish rugby player

== Others ==
- Michael McGrath (bishop) (1882–1961), Irish-born Welsh Roman Catholic prelate
- Michael McGrath (actor) (1957–2023), American performer in Broadway musicals

== See also ==
- Michael MacGrath (fl. 1980s–2020s), Irish judge
