= University of the Pacific Arthur A. Dugoni School of Dentistry =

Dental school in San Francisco, California

University of the Pacific, Arthur A. Dugoni School of Dentistry
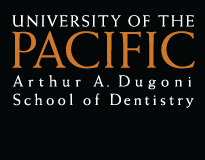
- Type: Private
- Established: 1896
- Dean: Elisa M. Chávez, DDS (Interim)
- Location: San Francisco, California, United States; 37.7824°N 122.4053°W
- Campus: Urban
- Tuition: $131,748 (2025–2026)

Arthur A. Dugoni School of Dentistry is the dental school of University of the Pacific. It is located in San Francisco's South of Market (SOMA) neighborhood in the U.S. state of California.

== History ==
The school was founded in 1896 as the College of Physicians and Surgeons with programs in dentistry, medicine, and pharmacy.

In 1918, the college focused its education program solely on dentistry but retained its name as the College of Physicians and Surgeons until it was incorporated into the University of the Pacific in 1962. In 2004 the school was named in honor of Arthur A. Dugoni, a former president of the American Dental Association, who served 28 years as dean.

The dental school offers a variety of dental services at its clinics in San Francisco and Sacramento. The school formerly operated the Union City Dental Care Clinic, but transferred it to La Clínica, who operates it today as La Clínica Dental Union City. In 2025, the school opened the Pacific Health Care Collaborative Clinic in Sacramento's Oak Park Neighborhood.

University of the Pacific still relies heavily upon the Ryan White HIV/AIDS Treatment Modernization Act funding to provide services for patients with HIV/AIDS; this funding is used to reimburse the school for services provided but has not increased in recent years despite increased costs of providing services.

== Three-year curriculum ==
The Dugoni School of Dentistry maintains an accelerated three-year DDS curriculum. Students complete a full curriculum of pre-clinical and basic sciences classes in their first year of dental school, as opposed to years one and two at other universities.

== Academic programs ==
- 3-year Doctor of Dental Surgery (DDS) Program
- 2-year International Dental Studies (IDS) Program
- 3-year Dental Hygiene Program
- 27-month Orthodontics Residency Program
- 27-month Endodontic Residency Program
- 1-year Endodontic Internship Program
- 5-year International General Dentist Educator Program
- 1-year Dental Sleep Medicine Fellowship
- 5-year Endodontics Residency + Doctorate Dual Degree Program
- 5-year Endodontics Residency + Doctorate Dual Degree Program
- 1-year Anesthesiology Internship Program

== Admissions ==
The average class size at University of the Pacific Arthur A. Dugoni School of Dentistry is about 145 students.

DAT Academic Average: 22.5

Average Overall GPA: 3.69

== See also ==
- American Student Dental Association
