= Carole Lieberman =

American psychiatrist

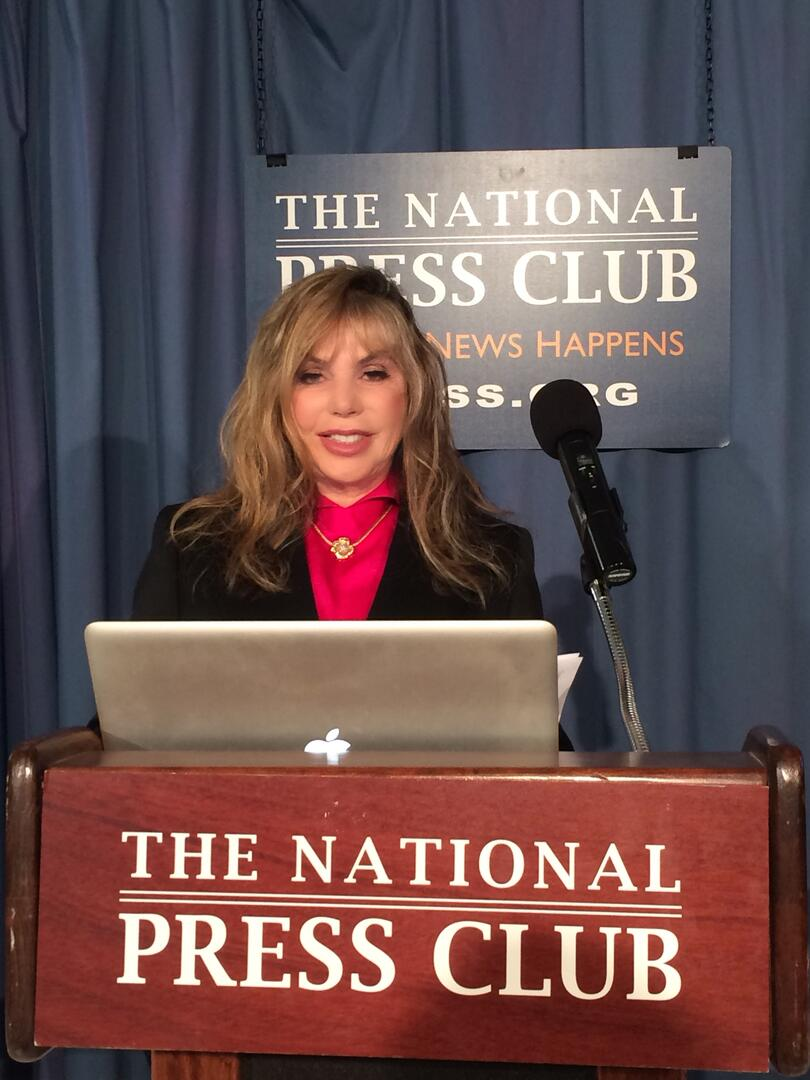
- Born: New York City, U.S.
- Education: Université Catholique de Louvain (MD) University of California, Los Angeles (MPH)
- Occupations: Psychiatrist, Author, Media personality
- Known for: Media appearances, expert witness testimony
- Website: terroristtherapist.com

Carole Lieberman is an American psychiatrist and author who has provided expert witness testimony for cases including the murder of Scott Amedure. She gained attention in 2011 due to her suggesting video games cause aggression and lead to sexual assault.

== Biography ==
Carole Lieberman was born and raised in New York City. She received her medical degree from Belgium's Université Catholique de Louvain and received her psychiatric residency training at New York University, Bellevue, where she was Chief Resident. She studied in London, England at the Anna Freud Hampstead Clinic as well as the Institute of Psychiatry/Maudsley Hospital. She is a diplomate of the American Board of Psychiatry and Neurology. She received her Master's of Public Health degree from the University of California, Los Angeles where she also serves as a member of Clinical Faculty in the department of Psychiatry. Lieberman has appeared as a media expert for TV news, radio talk shows, print publications, and other media outlets. She has appeared on The Dr. Phil show; The Insider: Celebrity Stalking and the Role of Social Media, CBS news, NBC news, ABC news, KTLA news, The Morton Report. and news blogs.

Lieberman has appeared before the United States Congress providing testimony at the Congressional Hearing of the Subcommittee on National Security, International Affairs, and Criminal Justice of the Committee on Government Reform and Oversight - "Report from the Front Line: The Drug War in Hollywood"; she provided a statement at U.S. Senator Kent Conrad (D-North Dakota) Press Conference to announce the formation of a Citizens Task Force on TV Violence; she appeared before the U.S. Senate Judiciary Committee Joint Hearing, Constitution Subcommittee chaired by Senator Paul Simon (D-Illinois) and the House Judiciary Committee's Subcommittee on Crime and Criminal Justice – "10 Point Plan to Sweep Violence Off TV and Off Our Streets".

== Video game statements ==
During a February 2011 interview with Fox News, Lieberman claimed that there existed a correlation between violent video games and sexual assault: "The increase in rapes can be attributed in large part to the playing out of [sexual] scenes in video games". However, in Wired magazine, journalist Jason Schreier wrote that when asked "multiple times to clarify her comments, she failed to cite a single study, statistic or piece of evidence that proved her point". Lieberman eventually responded with a single study to support her case as of February 14, 2011: "Violent Video Game Effects on Aggression, Empathy, and Prosocial Behavior in Eastern and Western Countries: A Meta-Analytic Review". However, the article makes no mention of sexual crime. Her claims were also ridiculed by Douglas Gentile, a professor at Iowa State University who studies the relationship between media and violence. Gentile, who "has been researching violence in media since 1999 [and] has written books and studies about the psychological effects of videogames", said of Lieberman's claims: "I don't know where [she] would get any evidence for this opinion. There's really very little to substantiate her claims in research literature."

== Books and publications ==
- Bad Girls: Why Men Love Them & How Good Girls Can Learn Their Secrets, Cogito Media 2010 ISBN 978-2-923865-12-6
- Coping with Terrorism: Dreams Interrupted, co-authored by Mike Darton. European Atlantic Publications 2006 ISBN 978-1-905770-02-1
- Bad Boys: Why We Love Them, How to Live with Them & When to Leave Them Dutton/Signet 1997 ISBN 0-525-94116-9
- Reflection of the Early Theological Education of Martin Heidegger (a psychological profile), Journal of Religious Studies, 9 #2: 34–41
- Problems of Women Psychiatric Residents Psychiatric Quarterly, 53 #3: 175–177
- "Schizo-Affective Illness Defies the Dichotomy...And Keeps DSM III Pondering," Schizophrenia Bulletin, 5 #3: 436–440
- "The Existential 'School' of Thought...A Study of Existentialism and Education," The Clearing House
- "Ambiguity in the Treatment of the Concept of God in Sein and Zeit (Being and Time) as a Reflection of the Early Theological Education of Martin Heidegger" (a psychological profile), Journal of Religious Studies, 9 #2: 34–41
- "Compulsive Shopping" – Encyclopædia Britannica
