= BaleDoneen method =

Heart attack and stroke treatment method

- Specialty: Cardiology

The BaleDoneen method is a risk assessment and treatment protocol aimed at preventing heart attack and stroke. The method also seeks to prevent or reduce the effects of type 2 diabetes. The method was developed by Bradley Field Bale and Amy Doneen.

== Description ==
Similar to other protocols, the method tests for cholesterol levels, blood pressure, and diabetes mellitus, as well as factors not included in other current protocols, including systemic inflammation, vitamin D deficiency, insulin resistance, elevated levels of lipoprotein(a), and genetic risks, to identify potential root causes of arterial plaque.

Testing for plaque includes a carotid intima-media thickness test, (CIMT), which measures blood flow through the arteries and the thickness of the arteries. Physician Dr. Jeff Emery wrote that the test "allows us to identify if you are at future risk for a heart attack or stroke." The American Heart Association has recommended CIMT as "a safe, non-invasive and relatively inexpensive means of assessing subclinical atherosclerosis. The technique is valid and reliable." The method also uses the coronary artery calcium score (CAC), a measurement of the amount of calcium in the walls of the arteries that supply the heart muscle, using a coronary CT calcium scan of the heart. CAC has been shown to be an independent marker of risk for cardiac events, cardiac mortality, and all-cause mortality.

The method uses urine and blood tests to check inflammatory markers, such as a high-sensitivity C-reactive protein test (CRP) measuring CRP, a protein in found in blood that indicates inflammation throughout the body. In 2017, results of the CANTOS trial demonstrated that anti-inflammatory therapies reduce risk for heart attack, stroke, other cardiovascular events and cancer by up to 50%.

The method ties results of this testing to considerations of lifestyle, diet, sleep disorders, stress levels, genetic factors, and dental care, and personalized treatment targets are set to reduce patients' cardiovascular risk. In some cases, these goals exceed those set by standard care. A common protocol for blood pressure indicates that an adult male with a reading of 130/85 is not at risk for a heart attack if the patient is being treated for high blood pressure. However the American Heart Association and the BaleDoneen method define safe levels as being below 120/80.

== Effectiveness ==
In a retrospective study that analyzed data from patients who had received cardiovascular risk reduction treatments that included lipid-lowering medications, lifestyle modification, and additional therapies for those with insulin resistance, type 2 diabetes, hypertension, metabolic syndrome, and other cardiovascular risks. The following outcomes were reported during the first year of treatment with the BaleDoneen method, compared to baseline: 50% decrease in the size of carotid artery plaque deposits, 30% drop in triglycerides, 25% drop in LDL cholesterol, and 6% rise in HDL cholesterol.

A retrospective study of patients treated with the BaleDoneen method, reported statistically significant reductions in CIMT measurements, plaque burden, fasting blood sugar, LDL cholesterol and inflammation over an eight-year period. Limitations of the study include lack of diversity in the study subjects, nearly all of whom were Caucasian, and lack of a comparison group. Randomized controlled clinical trials are needed to compare the effect of the method with standard treatment protocols.

== Treatments ==
For the treatment of arterial disease, the method uses pharmaceuticals such as statins, baby aspirin (low dose aspirin), renin–angiotensin–aldosterone system inhibitors (RAAS inhibitors), and other drugs that are common tools for most physicians, as well as vitamins, supplements, lifestyle modification, and a diet based on the patient's DNA. The method also recommends significant attention to dental care to improve heart and circulatory system health, including brushing and flossing teeth twice a day.
