= Christopher Goffard =

American journalist

- Education: Cornell University
- Occupations: Journalist; author; podcaster

Christopher Goffard is a Pulitzer Prize-winning American journalist, author, and podcaster. He is a staff writer for the Los Angeles Times and was a finalist for the Edgar Allan Poe Award for the Best First Novel. His podcast Dirty John has been downloaded more than 50 million times.

== Life and career ==
Goffard grew up in Los Angeles, California and graduated from Cornell University with an English degree. His career first started by covering city hall, law enforcement, and court beats for The St. Petersburg Times. Goffard's last story for St. Petersburg Times was "The $40 lawyer". In January 2006 Goffard became a staff writer for the Los Angeles Times.

He wrote his first crime novel Snitch Jacket (2007) and was a finalist for the Edgar Allan Poe Award For Best First Novel in 2008. His writing continued in 2011 with his second non-fiction book, You Will See Fire: A Search For Justice In Kenya (2012). Goffard's two-part series jump-started the Los Angeles Times’ first ebook A Nightmare Made Real. Goffard also launched his podcast Dirty John in October 2017, which was later adapted into a TV series of the same name.

== Pulitzer Prize ==
Goffard led the Pulitzer Prize-winning team of reporters who wrote "How Bell Hit Bottom" in 2010.

In 2007, Goffard became a Pulitzer Prize finalist for feature writing. In 2010, he was part of the investigative reporting team covering the city officials corruption of public funds in Bell, California. The Los Angeles Times won the Pulitzer Prize in 2011 for public service. Goffard again became a Pulitzer Prize finalist for feature writing in 2014 for his story "The Manhunt For Christopher Dorner".

== Other awards ==
"How Bell Hit Bottom" also won the George Polk Award for local reporting, the Selden Ring Award for Investigative Reporting, and the American Society of News Editors Distinguished Writing Award for Local Accountability Reporting.
