= Arthur A. Dugoni =

American orthodontist and educator (1925–2020)

- Born: June 29, 1925
- Died: September 23, 2020 (aged 95)
- Education: University of San Francisco; Gonzaga University; University of Washington

Arthur A. Dugoni (June 29, 1925 – September 23, 2020) was an American dentist and educator. He was the dean of the School of Dentistry at the University of the Pacific, later renamed as Arthur A. Dugoni School of Dentistry.

Dugoni served in several leadership roles, including president of the California Dental Association, the American Dental Association, and the American Board of Orthodontics. He both lectured and authored over 175 articles in the field of dentistry.

At the University of Pacific, Dugoni promoted a student-centered, “humanistic model” of dental education that became a national standard. Dugoni also worked to address the cost of dental education and advocated for dental licensure reform. During his tenure as the university's dean, the school completed a capital campaign in 2006, raising $65.7 million, the largest amount ever raised for a U.S. dental school at the time.

== Early life and education ==
Dugoni was born on June 29, 1925 in San Francisco, California to two Italian immigrant parents, Arthur and Lina Dugoni. He graduated in 1943 as valedictorian from St. James High School (later reopened as Riordan High School) in San Francisco. He began college at the age of 17 at the University of San Francisco before transferring to Gonzaga University in Spokane, Washington. Dugoni graduated from Gonzaga in 1944.

== Career ==
Encouraged by his family dentist, Dugoni enrolled in dental school at the University of Missouri–Kansas City before completing his D.D.S. degree at the College of Physicians and Surgeons in San Francisco.

After establishing a clinical practice, Dugoni returned to dental school in 1951, as an assistant professor of operative dentistry. He held subsequent faculty positions, including professor and chair of the Department of Orthodontics. In 1963, he completed his M.S.D. degree in Orthodontics at the University of Washington. He also established the primary and mixed dentition orthodontic clinic at the University of the Pacific. Dugoni maintained a private orthodontic practice in South San Francisco until 1987.

From 1978 to 2006, he was appointed dean of the School of Dentistry at the University of the Pacific.

Dugoni served as president of the American Dental Association (1988–1989), the American Dental Association Foundation, the American Association of Dental Schools, and the California Dental Association. He also served as treasurer of the Fédération Dentaire Internationale (FDI World Dental Federation). Among his honors, Dugoni was elected in 1998 to the FDI World Dental Federation List of Honor.

In 2001, he received the William John Gies Award from the American College of Dentists. The California Dental Association recognized him with its Dale F. Redig Distinguished Service Award in 2003.

On August 28, 2004, the university renamed the University of the Pacific School of Dentistry, to the Arthur A. Dugoni School of Dentistry.

Dugoni resigned as dean in 2006 but continued his affiliation with the school and university as Dean Emeritus, a professor of orthodontics, and a senior executive for development.

In 2009, the ADEAGies Foundation honored him with its Award for Outstanding Achievement - Dental Educator. He received honorary doctoral degrees from the University of Detroit, the University of Louisville, and Louisiana State University.

Dugoni was a fellow of the American and International College of Dentists and the Academy of Dentistry International. He was also a member of the Pierre Fauchard Academy and a founding member of the National Academies of Practice. He was an honorary member and fellow of the Academy of General Dentistry and an honorary member of the American Academy of Oral Medicine.

== Personal life ==
Dugoni and his wife, Katherine Groo met at Gonzaga and married in 1949 at St. Aloysius Church on the Gonzaga University campus. Dugoni and his wife had seven children, fifteen grandchildren, and nine great-grandchildren.

Dugoni died on September 23, 2020, at age 95, at his home in Palo Alto.
