= AADA =

The acronym AADA may refer to:

- Advances in Adaptive Data Analysis, a publication by World Scientific
- "Anders als die Andern" (Different from the Others), the first German movie about homosexuality
- American Academy of Dramatic Arts, a conservatory in New York
- American Autoduel Association, both a fictional organization in Car Wars and its official fan club
- Australian Institute of Music – Dramatic Arts, formerly the Australian Academy of Dramatic Art, theatre school in Sydney
