= Periscope Entertainment =

Los Angeles-based film company

Periscope Entertainment is a Los Angeles–based film and comic book company that was founded in 2004 by producer David Guy Levy. It has several projects in development and set for release.

== Film releases ==
- The Mandela Effect, directed by David Guy Levy starring Charlie Hofheimer, Aleksa Palladino, Robin Lord Taylor and Clarke Peters.
- London Fields, directed by Mathew Cullen starring Amber Heard, Theo James, Jim Sturgess and Billy Bob Thornton.
- Banking on Bitcoin, The documentary shows the players who are defining how this technology will shape our lives. The film was directed by Christopher Cannucciari and produced by David Guy Levy.
- Would You Rather, Desperate to help her ailing brother, a young woman agrees to compete in a deadly game of "Would You Rather," hosted by a sadistic aristocrat. Starring Brittany Snow and Jeffrey Combs, the film was directed by David Guy Levy and written by Steffen Schlachtenhaufen.
- Terri, Azazel Jacobs' follow-up to his Sundance hit, "Momma's Man", from the Independent Spirit Award nominated script by Patrick deWitt, Terri is a boy just trying to survive his awkward years as a teenager. John C. Reilly and Jacob Wysocki star.
- August, directed by Austin Chick and starring Josh Hartnett, Adam Scott, Naomie Harris, with David Bowie and Rip Torn, which centers on two brothers fighting to keep their start-up company afloat on Wall Street during the month of August, 2001. AUGUST premiered at the 2008 Sundance Film Festival and was Periscope Entertainment's first motion picture release.
- Lying, the directorial debut of M Blash, starring Chloë Sevigny, Jena Malone and Leelee Sobieski, which follows the unraveling of a pathological liar during a weekend with some friends at her family's country home. Lying was an official selection of the Directors Fortnight program at the Cannes Film Festival.

== Comic releases ==
- Pet Human, created and written by David Guy Levy, Illustrated by Alex Heywood, and written by Steffen Schlachtenhaufen.
- Back to Back to the Future, created and written by David Guy Levy with art by Jeffrey Spokes.
- Cornboy, created and written by Pamela Corkey, adapted and written by Joshua Dysart.

== Future projects ==
Projects in development for Periscope include:

- The Peanut Butter Solution, Michael Baskin is an average, everyday little boy. And, Like most eleven-year-olds, has a vivid imagination that sometimes gets the best of him. But nothing, not even his wildest imaginings, can prepare little Michael for the strange and enchanting adventure that will change his life. David Guy Levy teams up with Rock Demmers, the original producer of the 1985 award-winning family film, for this classic remake.
