= Don't Look Up (2009 film) =

American horror film

- Film poster
- Directed by: Fruit Chan
- Screenplay by: Brian Cox
- Based on: Don't Look Up by Hideo Nakata
- Produced by: Yoko Asakura; Brian Cox; Anant Singh
- Starring: Reshad Strik; Henry Thomas; Carmen Chaplin; Kevin Corrigan; Daniela Sea; Zelda Williams; Eli Roth; Lothaire Bluteau
- Cinematography: Hang-Song Poon
- Edited by: Chris Wright
- Music by: Tony Humecke
- Production companies: Distant Horizon; Action 5; Reel Deal Entertainment; Hakuhodo DY Music & Pictures; Videovision Entertainment
- Distributed by: Entertainment One UK
- Release dates: September 26, 2009 (Sweden); July 27, 2010 (United States)
- Running time: 85 minutes
- Countries: United States; Japan; South Africa
- Language: English

Don't Look Up is a 2009 American supernatural horror film directed by Fruit Chan and starring Reshad Strik, Henry Thomas, Kevin Corrigan, Eli Roth, and Lothaire Bluteau. It is a remake of the 1996 Japanese film of the same name by Hideo Nakata.

== Plot ==
In 1928, Hungarian filmmaker Bela Ort (Eli Roth) embarks on a film project based on the Romanian legend of the mulli, a story about a girl named Matya (Zelda Williams), born with a birth deformity who was unjustly killed by her fellow villagers due to the belief that her mother had made a pact with Satan to conceive her. Vengeful in death, she produces a malevolent curse and inflicts it on the village. Bela Ort disappears without a trace in the middle of shooting, leaving his film unfinished and his reels lost.

In present day 2009, Marcus Reed (Reshad Strik), an award-winning filmmaker who bases his work on his psychic visions, travels to the Transylvania Plateau in Romania to find the old studio where Ort's film had been shot and abandoned. His goal is to do an extended remake of Ort's unfinished film about the mulli, using the original single frame of the film that still exists in some capacity. Gathering a crew together, the remake commences production, only for the set to be plagued by mysterious deaths. Marcus, to the disbelief of his own crew and producers, starts to suspect that Matya's spirit haunts the surviving celluloid and is trying to be reborn.

== Cast ==
- Reshad Strik as Marcus Reed
- Henry Thomas as Josh Petri
- Carmen Chaplin as Romy Bardoc
- Kevin Corrigan as Davis
- Daniela Sea as Tami
- Zelda Williams as Matya
- Eli Roth as Bela Olt
- Lothaire Bluteau as Grigore
- Alyssa Sutherland as Claire
- Shiloh Fernandez as Garret

== Production ==
The remake rights to the film had been purchased in 2003 by Distant Horizon after the success of The Ring (2002) showed that J-horror remakes had a market. Distant Horizon initially wanted to bring back Hideo Nakata to direct the remake, who turned it down. It was announced on September 4, 2007 that Hong Kong filmmaker Fruit Chan would helm this American remake of Don’t Look Up (1996), produced by Distant Horizon, in association with Japanese production company Action 5. Principal Photography mainly took place in Romania and South Africa. It was Chan’s first film in the English language.

Chan had long since been a fan of Nakata and his works, being eager to direct a remake of his earlier J-horror film before the smash hit Ring (1998), saying: "I loved the original film by Hideo Nakata", in an interview with Variety. "And I was happy to take on the remake. For too long I've been labeled as an art-house director. I'm a director".

== Release ==
The first trailer for the film dropped on August 9, 2009. The film had its first premiere in Sweden at the 2009 Lund Fantastik Film Festival. This was followed by a screening at the Sitges Film Festival on October 2, 2009.

=== Home Media ===
The film was released by Entertainment One UK on DVD and Blu-ray on July 27, 2010 in the United States, ultimately skipping the theatrical release due to the diminishing interest in J-horror remakes in the market at the time. Both discs have since gone out of print.

== Reception ==
The film received generally negative reviews. Richard Scheib, writing for Moria Reviews, was particularly critical of the film and noting that it was yet another derivative J-horror remake in the vein of The Ring (2002) and The Grudge (2004), writing: "Certainly, Don’t Look Up is making a blatant play for the same territory as Ring and The Grudge. I have not seen the original Don’t Look Up but you can see the embryo of Ring in what ends up on screen here – no doubt the reason that the producers of the remake latched onto it as a property – the sinister figure of the girl with the hair across her eyes, flies manifesting from out of paused video screens. In the remake, the location has been moved from Japan to Romania – somehow the story makes more sense when it is considered as a Japanese story about filmmakers determining to resurrect a lost film made during World War II than it does when translated into the cliched territory of the Hollywood imagined version of Transylvania".

Don Anelli, writing for Asian Movie Pulse, was particularly critical of the excess jump-scares, writing: "Among the biggest flaws in ‘Don’t Look Up’ is the fact that there’s just no end to the rather convoluted and completely meaningless visions Marcus keeps experiencing. The most distressing factor is that these don’t really further the movie at all. Rather than serving as a way to keep going on the filmed movie or even gaining insight into how to defeat the ghostly being stalking around the set, they’re more used to showcase supposedly creepy images and jump-scares".
