= Would You Rather (film) =

2012 film by David Guy Levy

- Theatrical release poster
- Directed by: David Guy Levy
- Written by: Steffen Schlachtenhaufen
- Produced by: Zak Kilberg; Maura Anderson; David Guy Levy
- Starring: Brittany Snow; Jeffrey Combs; Enver Gjokaj; Charlie Hofheimer; Sasha Grey; John Heard; Jonny Coyne; June Squibb; Logan Miller; Lawrence Gilliard Jr.; Eddie Steeples; Robin Lord Taylor; Robb Wells
- Cinematography: Steven Capitano Calitri
- Edited by: Josh Schaeffer
- Music by: Daniel Hunt; Barði Jóhannsson
- Production companies: The Lambrick Foundation; Periscope Entertainment; Social Construct Films; Dreamher Productions
- Distributed by: IFC Midnight
- Release dates: October 14, 2012 (Screamfest); February 8, 2013 (United States)
- Running time: 93 minutes
- Country: United States
- Language: English

Would You Rather is a 2012 American psychological horror thriller film directed by David Guy Levy and starring Brittany Snow and Jeffrey Combs. It is based on the party game "would you rather", and centers on a woman named Iris as she attends a dinner party, where she must partake in life-threatening games to help her sick younger brother secure a donor after he is diagnosed with leukemia.

The film premiered at Screamfest on October 14, 2012. It was released in select theaters and through video on demand in the United States on February 8, 2013, by IFC Midnight.

== Plot ==
A young woman named Iris struggles to finance her brother Raleigh's leukemia treatment. Their oncologist, Dr. Barden, introduces Iris to Shepard Lambrick, a wealthy philanthropist who offers her a deal. If she wins a mysterious game at Shepard's dinner party, he will pay for Raleigh's treatment and use his connections to find a bone marrow donor.

At the dinner party, Iris meets the other contestants: Lucas; Travis, a war veteran; Linda, a paralyzed elderly woman; Peter, a gambling addict; Amy; Conway, an alcoholic debtor; and Cal. Shepard tries to test their principles by offering money for compromising choices. Iris reluctantly accepts $10,000 to eat meat despite being a vegetarian, and Conway accepts $50,000 to drink a decanter of Scotch as a recovering alcoholic.

Once dinner is over, Shepard reveals that the game is a version of "would you rather." The contestants must make difficult choices, and the last person standing will win. Conway tries to leave out of anger, but is shot dead by Bevans, Shepard's butler, demonstrating the seriousness of the game. The first round involves an electric shock machine, and no one is eliminated.

Tensions rise, particularly between Travis and Julian, Shepard’s son, as the second round begins. Each player must choose to stab the person next to them with an ice pick or whip Travis with a sjambok. Iris and Lucas choose to whip Travis out of fear, while Peter stabs Linda, and then Linda stabs Amy. Linda soon dies as a result of Peter stabbing Linda’s artery and her bleeding out. Amy stabs Iris, but she survives thanks to Lucas's intervention. Cal then whips Travis until he is mortally injured and removed from the game.

Amidst the chaos, Lucas creates a distraction, and everyone except Amy attempts to escape. However, Cal is shot and killed during the escape attempt. Julian chases Iris and tries to rape her but she stabs him in the leg with the ice pick. Dr. Barden, regretting his decision to involve Iris, tries to save her, only to be killed by Bevans. Iris is brought back to the game, and Shepard apologizes for his son's behavior, mentioning his wife's passing and saying that due to Julian's mother dying he has been lacking restraint.

The third round presents a choice between being submerged underwater in a barrel for two minutes or picking a task from a card. Peter's card leads to his death from a heart attack caused by an explosive firecracker, which blows his hand apart. Lucas slits his own eyeball with a razor as required by his card but survives. Iris chooses the barrel and survives, while Amy, who once witnessed her husband drown their daughter, pulls a card that doubles the required time to four minutes submerged underwater, and is forced into the barrel and drowns after not getting a chance to take a deep breath first.

In the final round, only Iris and Lucas remain. Iris is given the choice to kill Lucas and win the game or spare him, resulting in no reward for either of them. After hesitation, Lucas tries to tell Iris about his goal in the game, only for her to fatally shoot him, making Iris win the game after all the twisted stages. Shepard declares her the champion, providing her with a bag of money to cover Raleigh's treatment and more. He reveals that a bone marrow donor has already been found for Raleigh in Romania. Upon returning home, Iris discovers that Raleigh has committed suicide by overdosing on his medicine. Realizing that the horrific acts she committed to win the money were all in vain, Iris cries over the loss of her brother and the meaningless nature of her victory.

== Cast ==
- Brittany Snow as Iris
- Jeffrey Combs as Shepard Lambrick
- Jonny Coyne as Bevans
- Lawrence Gilliard Jr. as Dr. Barden
- Enver Gjokaj as Lucas
- Sasha Grey as Amy
- John Heard as Conway
- Charlie Hofheimer as Travis Schulke
- Eddie Steeples as Cal
- June Squibb as Linda
- Robin Lord Taylor as Julian Lambrick
- Robb Wells as Peter
- Logan Miller as Raleigh
- Larry Cedar as driver
- Ptolemy Slocum as shift manager
- Bobby C. King as steward 1
- Adam Mayfield as steward 2

== Production ==
Principal photography on Would You Rather began in July 2011. It was filmed on location in Pasadena, Woodland Hills, and Los Angeles, California.

Crispin Glover was originally cast as Shepard Lambrick, but exited the role a few weeks before filming began.

== Reception ==
On the review aggregator website Rotten Tomatoes, the film holds an approval rating of 61% based on 23 reviews, with an average rating of 5.5/10. The website's critics consensus reads, "Though restrained by most torture porn standards, Would You Rather's brilliant premise is ultimately harmed by its tendency towards blood and guts." Metacritic, which uses a weighted average, assigned the film a score of 20 out of 100, based on 11 critics, indicating "generally unfavorable" reviews.
