= Curse, Death & Spirit =

1992 three-part anthology of Japanese ghost stories

Japanese name
- Kanji: ほんとにあった怖い話 呪死霊
Transcriptions
- Revised Hepburn: Honto ni atta kowai hanashi: Jushiryō
- Directed by: Hideo Nakata
- Screenplay by: Hiroshi Takahashi; Akihiko Sit
- Starring: Michiko Hata; Maiko Kawakami; Mitsuko Oka; Yasuyo Shiratori; Yuma Nakamura; Miki Mizuno; Kyoko Enamii
- Release date: 1992
- Running time: 62 min.
- Country: Japan

Curse, Death & Spirit (ほんとにあった怖い話 呪死霊) is a 1992 three-part anthology of Japanese ghost stories from director Hideo Nakata. The DVD version was licensed and distributed by AsiaVision.

== Story ==
The movie consist of three storylines.

The Cursed Doll: Satomi is being called by someone in her dreams. Following the voice, she discovers it's coming from a doll, which houses the spirit of her deceased sister.

The Spirit of the Dead: A woman takes her son camping after her husband's death but was disrupted when a ghost of a woman thinks that the boy is her child.

The Haunted Inn: A spirit forces three girls who are on a vacation in a traditional Japanese inn, in which a tragedy had occurred a long time ago, to repeat the events of the day.

== Cast & crew ==
Screenplay:

- Hiroshi Takahashi
- Akihiko Sit

Director:

- Hideo Nakata

Cast:

- Michiko Hata
- Maiko Kawakami
- Mitsuko Oka
- Yasuyo Shiratori
- Yuma Nakamura
- Miki Mizuno
- Kyoko Enami

== See also ==
- List of ghost films
