= Ptolemy Slocum =

American actor (born 1975)

- Born: 20 November 1975 (age 50); Nairobi, Kenya
- Occupation: Actor
- Years active: 2003–present

Ptolemy Slocum (born 20 November 1975) is an American actor, known for his role as Sylvester in Westworld.

Slocum was born in the Kenyan capital Nairobi. He was named after the Greek astronomer Claudius Ptolemy and has been active as an actor since 2003. He first starred in several short films, before his first film appearance in 2005, portraying Ron in Hitch. As a result, he began to take on guest roles in numerous well-known US series, such as The Sopranos, The Wire, Fringe, Burn Notice, How I Met Your Mother, Criminal Minds, Emergence and others.

Slocum has taken on more recurring roles, such as in Looking and Preacher. He played the role of Sylvester in the science fiction series Westworld from 2016 until the series was cancelled in 2022.

Slocum is an alumnus of the George Washington University and college comedy group receSs.

== Filmography ==
=== Film ===
| Year | Title | Role | Notes |
|---|---|---|---|
| 2023 | Barbie | Corporate Man | |
| 2019 | The Mandela Effect | Manning | |
| 2018 | Vice | Focus Group Participant | |
| 2016 | Wild Oats | Luke | |
| 2013 | Detour | Preston | |
| 2012 | Would You Rather | Shift Manager | |
| 2009 | (Untitled) | Monroe | |
| 2005 | Hitch | Ron | |

=== Television ===
| Year | Title | Role | Notes |
|---|---|---|---|
| 2020–2021 | Good Girls | Carl | 2 episodes |
| 2019 | The Man in the High Castle | Raymond Doyle | 3 episodes |
| 2019 | Emergence | Ken | 2 episodes |
| 2019 | Baskets | George | 2 episodes |
| 2018 | iZombie | Doc Greeley | 1 episode |
| 2017 | Inhumans | Tibor | 4 episodes |
| 2016–2020 | Westworld | Sylvester | 12 episodes |
| 2016 | Looking | Hugo | 5 episodes |
| 2016 | Preacher | Linus | 2 episodes |
| 2015–2016 | Adam Ruins Everything | Phil | 2 episodes |
| 2015 | Your Pretty Face Is Going to Hell | Geoff | 3 episodes |
| 2014 | Looking | Hugo | 5 episodes |
| 2013 | Veep | Cody Marshall | 1 episode |
| 2012 | How I Met Your Mother | Larry | Episode: "46 Minutes" |
| 2008 | Fringe | Mark Young | Episode: "The Dreamscape" |
| 2008 | The Wire | Business Card Homeless Man | 3 episodes |
| 2007 | The Sopranos | Keith, Card Playing Patient | 1 episode |
| 2006 | Wonder Showzen | Coonter | 2 episodes |

=== Video games ===
| Year | Title | Role | Notes |
|---|---|---|---|
| 2007 | Manhunt 2 | Daniel Lamb | Voice and motion capture |
| 2005 | Grand Theft Auto: Liberty City Stories | Electron Zone Steve | |
