= Yuki Kohara =

Japanese former singer, actor, and idol (born 1980)

Yuki Kohara 小原 裕貴
- Born: 21 May 1980 (age 46); Okayama, Japan
- Occupations: Actor; singer
- Years active: 1991–2000; 2017
- Agent: Johnny & Associates

Yuki Kohara (Japanese: 小原 裕貴, Hepburn: Kohara Yūki; born 21 May 1980) is a Japanese former singer, actor, and idol whose career lasted from 1991 to 2000. He was a member of Johnny's Junior until 15 October 2000.

== Filmography ==
=== Music program ===
Year	Title	Role	Network	Notes
1992	43rd NHK Kōhaku Uta Gassen	Backup dancer	NHK	SMAP's "Yuki ga Futte Kita" performance
1992–1999	Music Station	Backup dancer Performer (1997)	TV Asahi	Back dancer for Johnny & Associates established artists. Interviewed eight times.
1993–1997	Idol on Stage	Cast member	NHK	
1994	45th NHK Kōhaku Uta Gassen	Backup Dancer	NHK	SMAP's "Ganbarimashou" performance
1996	47th NHK Kōhaku Uta Gassen	Backup Dancer	NHK	Masahiko Kondō's "Midnight Shuffle" performance
1997–2000	Music Jump	Cast member	NHK BS2	
1998	Let's Go Young	Cast member	NHK	Television special
1998	Boys Be... Jr. Talk Corner	Cast member	Nippon TV	

=== Variety program ===
Year	Title	Role	Network	Notes
1993–1996	Kiss shita? SMAP	Cast member	ABC	Irregular appearances
1994	Chōjin Dodgeball Densetsu	Cast member	KTV	
1994–1996	Ai Love SMAP	Cast member	TV Tokyo	Irregular appearances
1995	Tensai Takeshi no Genki ga Deru Terebi!!	Cast member	Nippon TV	"Johnny's Preparatory school" segments
1996–1998	Ai Love Junior	Cast member	TV Asahi	
1996	Jr. Gold	Cast member	TBS	Television special
1997	Mecha-Ike: Gachikon Iwashitaru! Special!!	Cast member	Fuji TV	Television special
1996–1997	Tsuyoshi Domoto no Do-Ya	Cast member	ABC	Irregular appearances
1997–1998	Show-Nen J	Cast member	ABC	Irregular appearances
1998–1999	8-Jida J	Cast member	TV Asahi	
1998	Gyu! to Dakishimetai!	Cast member	Nippon TV	
1999–2000	Seven Samurai: J House's Rebellion	Cast member	ABC	
1999–2000	Yattaru J	Cast member	TV Asahi	
2000	Shounen Club	Cast member	NHK BS2	Irregular appearances
2000	The Night of Hit Parade	Cast member	Nippon TV	
2000	Shōnen Time	Cast member	Fuji TV	

=== Television drama ===
Year	Title	Role	Network	Notes
1994	Ō-Edo Fūunden	Yasunosuke Kawai (child)	NHK	Jidaigeki
1996	Shadow Shōkai Henkirō	Michio Egaki	TV Asahi	
1997	Psychometrer Eiji	Yūsuke Kasai	Nippon TV	Main role
1997	Bokura no Yuki: Miman City	Kiichi	Nippon TV	Main role
1998	Boys Be... Jr.	Ryōta Kageyama; Takeshi Kondō	Nippon TV	Lead role Episode: "Couple in the Way 5×5"; Episode: "Cool Guy's Big Remodeling Plan"
1999	Nekketsu Renai Dō	Kenji Hoshikawa	Nippon TV	Lead role Episode: "Libra, Blood Type B Boy"
1999	Scary Sunday		Nippon TV	Lead role Episode: "Red Car"
1999	Psychometrer Eiji 2	Yūsuke Kasai	Nippon TV	Main role
2000	Mother's Song of Delight	Jun Hiyama	Fuji TV	Lead role
2000	Psychometrer Eiji SP	Yūsuke Kasai	Nippon TV	Main role, Television special
2000	Seven Samurai: J House's Rebellion	Yūki Jōnouchi	ABC	Main role
2017	Bokura no Yuki: Miman City 2017	Kiichi	Nippon TV	Main role, Television special

=== Film ===
Year	Title	Role	Notes
1998	Shinjuku Shōnen Tantei-dan		
2000	Sleeping Bride	Yūichi Nagasawa	Lead role

== See also ==
- Johnny & Associates
