= Back to Bosnia =

- Directed by: Sabina Vajrača
- Written by: Sabina Vajrača
- Produced by: Alison Hanson; Sabina Vajrača
- Starring: Sabina Vajrača
- Distributed by: Alternate Plan Productions
- Release date: 2005
- Running time: 75 minutes
- Country: Bosnia and Herzegovina
- Language: Bosnian / Serbian / English

Back to Bosnia (Bosnian: Na put Bosne (kući)) is a documentary film that shows the uphill battle that refugees face when trying to return to Bosnia, or even just to reclaim their properties.

It shows not only the problems that Bosniaks (Bosnian Muslims) face, but also the problems of Bosnian Serb refugees that moved to other parts of Bosnia. In addition it takes viewers to the sites of some of the worst atrocities in the second half of the 20th century and the investigations of these crimes.

The film marked the debut of writer and director Sabina Vajrača.

== Plot outline ==
Back to Bosnia is a documentary film about a family who returns to Bosnia in 2001, to reclaim the property they were forced out of at gun point. While there, the family is confronted with the destruction of their city's multi-ethnic character and forced to examine the community they left behind. They witness an exhumation, visit the sites of war crimes, and seek out the remnants of a city that was once their home, as well as confront those that forced them out.
