= Rika Adachi =

Japanese tarento and actress (born 1992)

- 足立 梨花
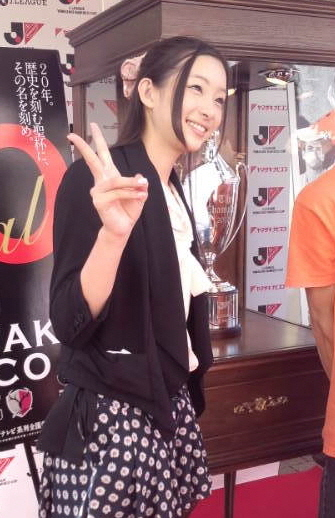
- Adachi at Outsourcing Stadium Nihondaira in 2012
- Born: 16 October 1992 (age 34); Nagasaki Prefecture, Japan
- Occupations: Actress, tarento
- Years active: 2007–present
- Agent: Horipro
- Known for: Twin Spica; Amachan
- Spouse: Tatsu (m. 2023)
- Website: twitter.com/adacchee

Rika Adachi (足立 梨花, Adachi Rika; born October 16, 1992) is a Japanese tarento and actress. She was born in Nagasaki Prefecture, and raised in Mie Prefecture. She has appeared in several films, including Say "I love you" (2014) and Ghost Theater (2015), and has played leading roles in the TV Drama Kinkyori Renai: Season Zero (2014) and Yōkoso, Wagaya e (2015).

== Personal life ==
On June 26, 2023, she announced her marriage with Tatsu from Japanese boy group Handsign.

== Filmography ==
=== Television ===
- Twin Spica (2009), Marika Ukita
- Amachan (2013), Megu Arima
- Pretty Proofreader (2016), Cecil Imai
- The Big Chase: Tokyo SSBC Files (2025), Sayaka Mitsumoto

=== Films ===
- Love Center (2008), Rika
- An Encyclopedia of Unconventional Women (2009), Tamae
- Ongakubito (2010), Karen Minami
- Go! Boys' School Drama Club (2011), Tamaki
- Diamond (2013), Nao
- Tokyo Legends I: Horror Of Human Hell (2014)
- Goose Bumps The Movie 2 (2014)
- Say "I love you" (2014), Aiko Muto
- Fantastic Girls (2015), Takemi Akimoto (1980s), Takemi Akimoto
- Ghost Theater (2015), Kaori
- Mars (2016)
- Last Vacation (2027)

=== Tokusatsu ===
- Kamen Rider × Kamen Rider Wizard & Fourze: Movie War Ultimatum (2012), Miyoko Ohki

=== Anime ===
- Pokémon XY: Hakai no Mayu to Diancie/Pokémon the Movie: Diancie and the Cocoon of Destruction (2014) - Marilyn Flame
- Detective Conan: The Eleventh Striker (movie 16) as Rika Adachi (2012)

== Bibliography ==
=== Magazines ===
- Duet, Shueisha 1986-, since 2008
- Myojo, Shueisha 1952-, since 2008

=== Photobooks ===
- Rika1 (17 October 2008, Gakken) ISBN 9784054038783
- 16→17 Boracay-tō ni Itte Kimashita! (23 December 2009, Gakken Publishing) ISBN 9784054043695
- Tokidoki Dokidoki (24 January 2011, Wani Books) ISBN 9784847043468
- Adajiring (27 June 2013, Wani Books) ISBN 9784847045585
- Rika 2007→2014 (3 October 2014, Gakken Publishing) ISBN 9784056106701
- Lyrical (14 October 2022, KADOKAWA) ISBN 9784048974349

== Awards ==
- The 32nd Horipro Talent Scout Caravan (2007)
