= Risa Goto =

Japanese actress and gravure idol (born 1983)

- Born: June 18, 1983 (age 42); Ukiha, Fukuoka, Japan
- Occupation: Actress
- Years active: 1997–2002; 2004–2014
- Spouses: unknown (m. 2007; div. 2009) unknown (m. 2015)
- Children: 1

Risa Goto (後藤 理沙, Goto Risa; born June 18, 1983) is a former Japanese actress and gravure idol. She was born in Ukiha, Fukuoka Prefecture, Japan. She is previously signed to the talent agency, JMO.

== Career ==
Risa Goto made her gravure idol debut in 1997, at age 13. The following year she starred in a Pocari Sweat commercial and gained popularity as the "beautiful girl in the drinking water commercial". She acted in several television dramas and films before retiring in 2002. Goto came back in 2004 and continued work as an actress.

On 2 November 2009, Goto announced she would be taking a break from entertainment activities and would be working at a nursing home to obtain caregiver qualifications.

Goto appeared on Fuji TV's news program Super News in January 2010. She revealed that she had gotten liposuction, breast augmentation, and other cosmetic surgeries in order to make a comeback as an actress. The program was a total coverage of her surgeries, for which Goto gained notoriety. That same month, she revealed that she had married a non-celebrity man in 2007, and that they had divorced the previous year. Goto made her stage debut in November 2010.

Goto married a non-celebrity man in April 2015. She gave birth to her first child on 17 July 2015.

== Filmography ==
=== Television ===
- Sekai de Ichiban Papa ga Suki (Fuji TV, 1998)
- Psychometrer Eiji 2 (NTV, 1999)
- Love Chat (Fuji TV, 2000)
- Meguru Natsu (Fuji TV, 2000)
- Shinjuku Bōsō Kyūkyūtai (NTV, 2000)
- Shijō Saiaku no Date (NTV, 2000)
- Onmyoji (NHK, 2001)
- Honke no Yome (NTV, 2001)
- Kenja no Okuri Mono (TV Asahi, 2001)
- Muta Keiji-kan vs. Shūchakueki no Ushio Keiji 2 (TV Asahi, 2002)
- Kaizu no nai Tabi (NHK, 2002)
- Mitsuhiko Asami Season 13 (Fuji TV, 2003)
- Xenos (TV Tokyo, 2007)
- Hōigaku Kyōshitsu no Jiken File (TV Asahi, 2007)

=== Film ===
- Sleeping Bride (2000)
- Chinchiromai (2000)
- Shibito no Koiwazurai (Love Ghost) (2001)
- Color of Pain Yarō (2001)
- Fuzoroina Himitsu (2007)
- Kanaria Jinsei o Umaku Tobenai Hito 2 (2012)
- Saikin, Chōchō wa... (2014)
