= Mary Kay Place =

American actress (born 1947)

- Place in 1977
- Born: September 23, 1947 (age 79); Tulsa, Oklahoma, U.S.
- Education: University of Tulsa
- Occupations: Actress; singer; director; screenwriter
- Years active: 1973–present

Mary Kay Place (born September 23, 1947) is an American actress, screenwriter and director. She is best known for portraying Loretta Haggers on the television series Mary Hartman, Mary Hartman, a role that won her the 1977 Primetime Emmy Award for Outstanding Supporting Actress – Comedy Series. Her numerous film appearances include Private Benjamin (1980), The Big Chill (1983), Captain Ron (1992) and The Rainmaker (1997). Place also recorded three studio albums for Columbia Records, one in the Haggers persona, which included the Top Ten country music hit "Baby Boy". For her performance in Diane (2018), Place won the Los Angeles Film Critics Association Award for Best Actress and the National Society of Film Critics Award for Best Actress.

== Early life ==
Mary Kay Place was born on September 23, 1947, in Tulsa, Oklahoma to Gwendolyn Lucille (née Johnson) and Bradley Eugene Place. She graduated from Nathan Hale High School and the University of Tulsa, where her father was an art professor. She was a member of Kappa Alpha Theta sorority.

== Career ==
Place moved to Hollywood with aspirations of becoming an actress and writer. She was hired for The Tim Conway Comedy Hour in the 1970s as a production assistant to both Conway and producer Norman Lear. Conway gave Place her first on-camera break, while Lear saw to it that Place received her first writing credit on his subsequent All in the Family. On the episode, she and actress Patty Weaver sang "If Communism Comes Knocking on Your Door, Don't Answer It." She appeared in the third-season episode of M*A*S*H titled "Springtime", for which she also received writing credits.

=== Mary Hartman, Mary Hartman and musical career ===
Lear then cast her in the role of would-be country and western star Loretta Haggers on the satirical soap opera Mary Hartman, Mary Hartman (1976–1977). She won an Emmy Award for her work as Loretta, and was nominated in 1977 for a Grammy Award for Best Country Vocal Performance, Female for the associated music album Tonite! At the Capri Lounge Loretta Haggers. Place wrote two of the songs on Tonite!: "Vitamin L" and "Baby Boy," both of which she sang on the television series as Loretta.

Both Tonite! At the Capri Lounge Loretta Haggers and its follow up Aimin' To Please featured A-list country and pop performers from the 1970s. Dolly Parton, on whom the Loretta character was loosely based, provided backing vocals as well as the song "All I Can Do" (which Parton also wrote). Emmylou Harris, Anne Murray and Nicolette Larson sang backup as well. Aimin' to Please's "Something to Brag About," a duet with Willie Nelson, earned the pair a place on the music charts in 1977.

While working on Mary Hartman, Mary Hartman, Place also wrote scripts for episodes of several TV situation comedies, including The Mary Tyler Moore Show, Phyllis and M*A*S*H, usually in collaboration with Linda Bloodworth-Thomason (who would later create Designing Women). She appeared in the M*A*S*H episode "Springtime," which she co-wrote with Bloodworth. She also made an appearance as a character named "Betty Sue" in the sitcom All in the Family in the episode "Archie Goes Too Far".

Place hosted Saturday Night Live in 1977 and also appeared as the musical guest (with Willie Nelson on the duet "Something to Brag About").

=== Late 1970s through 1990s ===
In the 1977 musical drama New York, New York, directed by Martin Scorsese, Place sings "Blue Moon" with Robert De Niro, whose character also accompanies her on saxophone. It is included in the original motion picture soundtrack.

In the 1979 Burt Reynolds romantic comedy, Starting Over, Place plays the first woman Reynolds dates after a divorce.

In 1983, Place had a key role in the Lawrence Kasdan ensemble piece The Big Chill as Meg, a single corporate attorney who wishes to be impregnated with her first child by one of her past college friends.

In the late 1980s and early 1990s, the actress appeared in a number of television films and a starring role in the 1992 Kurt Russell and Martin Short comedy Captain Ron. 1994 saw her return to television in the recurring role of Camille Cherski on My So-Called Life. In 1996, Place comically portrayed an evangelistic anti-abortion activist in Alexander Payne's debut feature film Citizen Ruth. She had a strong dramatic role as Dot Black, mother of a terminally ill young man, in Francis Ford Coppola's version of John Grisham's The Rainmaker in 1997.

Place was nominated for an Independent Spirit Award for her work in the 1996 film Manny & Lo with Scarlett Johansson and Aleksa Palladino. She plays the matronly Elaine, who would love to have a child and works in a maternity shop, but never married and is past her child-bearing years.

She directed episodes of the HBO sitcom Dream On, NBC's Friends and the series Baby Boom. She provided at least two voices for Fox's animated show King of the Hill in an episode in which Peggy Hill competes in the Mrs. Heimlich County Pageant. She voiced both a competitor and the coordinator of the pageant.

She appeared as Mrs. Betty Dustin in the made for TV drama "For my daughter's honor" (a.k.a. "Indecent Seduction") in 1996 in which she plays a mom in her real life native Oklahoma whose daughter Amy (played by Nicholle Tom) is being sexually harassed by the school football coach. Place also appeared in Being John Malkovich as the hard-of-hearing receptionist, Floris, and in Girl, Interrupted. While not in any scenes together, this marked the third time that Mary Kay had done a film with one of her former My So-Called Life co-stars: first with Claire Danes in The Rainmaker, second with Bess Armstrong in Pecker, then with Jared Leto in Interrupted.

=== 2000–2019 ===
In 2000, Place co-directed Don Henley's video for "Taking You Home". She had a small role in her second Lisa Krueger film, Committed.

She played the United States Surgeon General in a 2001 episode of NBC's The West Wing. The character returned in the 2004 season.

In the original PBS mini-series Armistead Maupin's Tales of the City, Place had a self-referential moment as a Maupin character during the Mary Hartman era in which the series is set. Laura Linney's character often watched Mary Hartman, Mary Hartman. Showtime picked up the Tales franchise, but Place was not in the second installment. She did have a role in the third mini-series, Further Tales of the City (2001), which featured her in the role of "Prue Giroux."

In 2002, Place had a sizable role in the Reese Witherspoon film Sweet Home Alabama as Witherspoon's character's mother, Pearl Smooter. That same year she was in Human Nature starring Tim Robbins and Patricia Arquette and A Woman's a Helluva Thing with Penelope Ann Miller as well as with Albert Brooks in the dark comedy My First Mister. The story focuses on a developing relationship between an isolated, rebellious 18-year-old (Leelee Sobieski) and an engaging older man (Brooks). Place played Brooks' best friend. The film marked the directorial debut of actress Christine Lahti.

Place played a Mormon mother in the film Latter Days (2003). From 2006 to 2011, she had a recurring role in HBO's Big Love, playing Adaleen Grant, the mother of the Chloë Sevigny character, Nicki. She also had a recurring role on the HBO comedy Bored to Death. Lily Tomlin and Place did the pilot and 5 episodes of 12 Miles of Bad Road from Harry Thomason and Linda Bloodworth-Thomason, who wrote television scripts with Place in the 1970s. HBO chose not to air the series, and producers were seeking other networks to air it.

In 2009, she served as the voice of Julie Powell's mother in the film Julie & Julia. In 2013, she appeared as Bryan's mother on The New Normal.

In 2015, Place guest starred on The Mentalist and Looking. She also starred in the comedy-drama film I'll See You in My Dreams directed by Brett Haley, opposite Blythe Danner, and The Breakup Girl directed by Stacy Sherman. She provided the voice of Anne Hathaway's mother in The Intern, directed by Nancy Meyers. Place also had a recurring role on Grace and Frankie opposite Jane Fonda and Lily Tomlin.

In 2016, Place starred in the comedy film The Hollars directed by John Krasinski and the comedy-drama Youth in Oregon directed by Joel David Moore. Place also portrayed Maria Bamford's mother in the comedy series Lady Dynamite which was cancelled after two seasons.

In 2017, Place guest starred in an episode of the comedy series Black-ish. She also had a cameo voice appearance in Downsizing directed by Alexander Payne. Place also had a recurring role on the comedy series Imposters.

In 2018, Place starred in State Like Sleep directed by Meredith Danluck and appeared in an episode of the anthology drama The Romanoffs. That same year, she starred in the drama film Diane directed by Kent Jones, and executive produced by Martin Scorsese. The film marked Place's first lead role in a film, and was written specifically for her by Jones. The film had its world premiere at the Tribeca Film Festival on April 22, 2018. Place's performance received rave reviews from critics. The film was released on March 29, 2019, by IFC Films. Place won the Los Angeles Film Critics Association Award for Best Actress and National Society of Film Critics Award for Best Actress for her performance. Place received nominations for Gotham Independent Film Award for Best Actress and Independent Spirit Award for Best Female Lead. Place also had a recurring role on Shameless.

=== 2020–present ===
In 2020, Place guest starred on the comedy-drama series AJ and the Queen and on Fox's 9-1-1: Lone Star as Theresa Blake, the mother to Liv Tyler's character. In 2021, Place played Millie in the musical drama Music, co-written and directed by Sia. She also starred in the musical The Prom based on the Broadway musical of the same title directed by Ryan Murphy, for Netflix.

== Filmography ==
=== Film ===
Year	Title	Role	Notes
1976	Bound for Glory	Sue Ann	
1977	New York, New York	Bernice Bennett	
1979	More American Graffiti	Teensa	
1979	Starting Over	Marie	
1980	Private Benjamin	Pvt. Mary Lou Glass	
1981	Modern Problems	Lorraine	
1982	Waltz Across Texas	Kit Peabody	
1983	The Big Chill	Meg Jones	
1983	Terms of Endearment	Doris	Voice
1985	Smooth Talk	Katherine Wyatt	
1985	Explorers	Mrs. Crandall	Uncredited
1988	A New Life	Donna	
1988	Portrait of a White Marriage	Joyce Harrison	
1990	Bright Angel	Judy	
1991	Samantha	Marilyn	
1992	Captain Ron	Katherine Harvey	
1994	Teresa's Tattoo	Nora	
1996	Citizen Ruth	Gail Stoney	
1996	Manny & Lo	Elaine	
1997	Eye of God	Claire Spencer	
1997	The Rainmaker	Dot Black	
1998	Naturally Native	Madame Celeste	
1998	How to Make the Cruelest Month	Mary Bryant	
1998	Pecker	Joyce	
1999	Judgment Day: The Ellie Nesler Story	Jan Martinez	
1999	Being John Malkovich	Floris	
1999	Girl, Interrupted	Barbara Gilcrest	
2000	Committed	Psychiatrist	
2001	My First Mister	Patty	
2001	Nailed	Fern Romano	
2001	Human Nature	Mrs. Bronfman	
2001	The Safety of Objects	Helen Christianson	
2002	Sweet Home Alabama	Pearl Smooter	
2003	Latter Days	Sister Gladys Davis	
2004	Evergreen	Susan	
2004	Killer Diller	Dr. Gwen Bradley	
2004	Silver City	Grace Seymour	
2005	Lonesome Jim	Sally	
2005	Nine Lives	Dr. Alma Wyatt	
2007	Grace Is Gone	Woman at Funeral	
2007	War Eagle, Arkansas	Jessie	
2007	Mama's Boy	Barbara	
2008	City of Ember	Mrs. Murdo	
2009	Julie & Julia	Mrs. Foster	Voice
2009	Youth in Revolt	Mrs. Saunders	
2009	It's Complicated	Joanne	
2010	Shrek Forever After	Guard Witch	Voice
2010	Leonie	Albiana Gilmour	
2012	Smashed	Rochelle	
2013	Bad Milo!	Beatrice	
2013	You're in Charge	Penny Guidry	
2014	Miss Meadows	Mrs. Davenport	
2014	Last Weekend	Jeannie	
2015	I'll See You in My Dreams	Rona	
2015	The Breakup Girl	Joan Baker	
2015	The Intern	Mrs. Ostin	Voice
2016	The Hollars	Pam	
2016	Youth in Oregon	Estelle Engersol	
2017	Downsizing	Land's End Customer	Voice
2018	State Like Sleep	Elaine Grand	
2018	Diane	Diane	
2020	The Prom	Grandma Bea	
2021	Music	Millie	
2022	My Father's Dragon	Narrator	Voice

=== Television ===
Year	Title	Role	Notes
1973	All in the Family	Betty Sue	Episode: "Archie Goes Too Far"
1974	M*A*S*H	Lt. Louise Simmons	Episode: "Springtime"
1975	The Mary Tyler Moore Show	Sally Jo Hotchkiss	Episode: "Murray in Love"
1976	The Cheerleaders	Margie	TV film
1976–1977	Mary Hartman, Mary Hartman	Loretta Haggers	Main role
1977	Saturday Night Live	Herself (host)	Episode: "Mary Kay Place/Willie Nelson"
1977–1978	Forever Fernwood	Loretta Haggers	TV series
1980	Act of Love	Becky Wiggins	TV film
1984	ABC Afterschool Special	Ellie Skinner	Episode: "Mom's on Strike"
1984	For Love or Money	K.K	TV film
1985	The History of White People in America	Joyce Harrison	TV film
1986	The Disney Sunday Movie	Prissy Thrash	Episode: "The Girl Who Spelled Freedom"
1986	The History of White People in America: Volume II	Joyce Harrison	TV film
1989	Out on the Edge	Sondra Evetts	TV film
1990	Thirtysomething	Patsy Klein	Episode: "Happy New Year"
1990	Traitor in My House	Elizabeth Van Lew	TV film
1991	Crazy from the Heart	Merrilee Playton	TV film
1992	Bed of Lies	Jean Daniel Murph	TV film
1992	Just My Imagination	Shilda Hawk	TV film
1993	Telling Secrets	Shelley Jefferson Carp	TV film
1993	Tales of the City	Prue Giroux	TV miniseries
1994	In the Line of Duty: The Price of Vengeance	Norma Williams	TV film
1994–1995	My So-Called Life	Camille Cherski	Recurring role
1995	Chicago Hope	Joanna Kenneally	Episode: "Freeze Outs"
1996	My Very Best Friend	Molly Butler	TV film
1996	For My Daughter's Honor	Betty Ann Dustin	TV film
1997	Love in Another Town	Sam	TV film
1998	Point Last Seen	Coreen Davis	TV film
1998–2009	King of the Hill	Various	Voice, 3 episodes
2000	The Wild Thornberrys	Nancy Tucker	Voice, episode: "Birthday Quake"
2001	Further Tales of the City	Prue Giroux	TV miniseries
2001	A Woman's a Helluva Thing	Cecilia Piloski	TV film
2001	Citizen Baines	Francesca Dunlop	Episode: "The Appraisal"
2001	Leap Years	Mrs. Greenway	Episode #1.18
2001–2004	The West Wing	Surgeon General Millicent Griffith	3 episodes
2002	Undeclared	Mrs. Lindquist	Episode: "Parents' Weekend"
2002	Law & Order: Special Victims Unit	Hope Garrett	Episode: "Vulnerable"
2004	The Handler	Naomi Prince	Episode: "Acts of Congress"
2005	Jack & Bobby	Rev. Rindhart	Episode: "A Child of God"
2006	Numb3rs	Hester Stirling	Episode: "Protest"
2006–2018	Grey's Anatomy	Olive Warner	3 episodes
2006–2011	Big Love	Adaleen Grant	Regular role
2007	The Minor Accomplishments of Jackie Woodman	Jeanette Woodman	2 episodes
2007	Saving Grace	Dorothy Edwina Talbert	Episode: "It's Better When I Can See You"
2008	12 Miles of Bad Road	C.Z. Shakespeare	Main role
2008	Pushing Daisies	Annabelle Vandersloop	Episode: "The Legend of Merle McQuoddy"
2010	Bored to Death	Kathryn Joiner	Recurring role
2012	The Life & Times of Tim	Dorothy	Voice, episode: "Action Packed Heist/Fall Foliage"
2013	Suburgatory	Gam Gam	Episode: "Blowtox and Burlap"
2013	Californication	Faith's Mother	Episode: "Blind Faith"
2013	The New Normal	Colleen	2 episodes
2013	A Country Christmas Story	Sarah	TV film
2013	Holidaze	Elaine Gerard	TV film
2014	Rake	Judge Cunningham	Episode: "Jury Tamperer"
2014–2015	Getting On	Dr. Ann Killigrew	Recurring role
2015	The Mentalist	Mrs. Bittacker	Episode: "The Whites of His Eyes"
2015	Looking	Sarah	Episode: "Looking for a Plot"
2015	Ellen More or Less	Virginia	TV film
2015–2016	Grace and Frankie	Amanda	3 episodes
2016	Family Guy	Farting Lady	Voice, episode: "The Heartbreak Dog"
2016–2017	Lady Dynamite	Marilyn Bamford	Main role
2017	Black-ish	Doctor Harris	Episode: "Good Dre Hunting"
2017–2018	Imposters	Marsha Bloom	6 episodes
2018	The Romanoffs	Marilyn Hopkins	Episode: "Expectation"
2019–2020	Shameless	Aunt Oopie	3 episodes
2020	AJ and the Queen	Hospital Administrator	Episode: "Baton Rouge"
2020	9-1-1: Lone Star	Theresa Blake	Recurring role

=== As director or writer ===
Year	Title	Notes
1973	The Shape of Things	Writer, TV special
1973–1974	M*A*S*H	Writer, 3 episodes
1974	Paper Moon	Writer, episode: "Gimme That Old Time Relation"
1974	Friends and Lovers	Writer, episode: "The Groupie"
1975	The Mary Tyler Moore Show	Writer, episode: "Mary's Delinquent"
1975	Phyllis	Writer, episode: "So Lonely I Could Cry"
1988	Baby Boom	Director, episode: "Stress"
1994	Dream On	Director, 2 episodes
1995	Friends	Director, episode: "The One with the List"
1996	Dream On	Director, episode: "Tenants, Anyone?"
1996	Arliss	Director, episode: "The Company You Keep"
2007	The Minor Accomplishments of Jackie Woodman	Director, 2 episodes

== Discography ==
=== Albums ===
Year	Album	U.S. Country	Label
1976	Tonite! At the Capri Lounge Loretta Haggers	6	Columbia
1977	Aimin' to Please	40	Columbia
2011	Almost Grown	—	Wounded Bird/Sony

Note: Both of Place's albums just missed charting on the general pop Billboard Hot 200 chart, her 1976 bubbled under in the ten runner-up slots at #202 and the 1977 at #203.

=== Singles ===
Year	Single	Chart Positions			Album
Year	Single	U.S. Country	U.S.	Can. Country	Album
1976	"Baby Boy"	3	60	6	Tonite! At the Capri Lounge Loretta Haggers (credited to "Mary Kay Place as Loretta Haggers")
1977	"Vitamin L"	72	—	—	Tonite! At the Capri Lounge Loretta Haggers (credited to "Mary Kay Place as Loretta Haggers")
1977	"Something to Brag About" (with Willie Nelson)	9	—	15	Aimin' to Please

Preceded by Buck Henry	Saturday Night Live Host; December 10, 1977	Succeeded by Miskel Spillman
