= Reshad Strik =

Bosnian Australian actor (born 1980)

- Born: 22 June 1981 (age 45); Canberra, Australian Capital Territory, Australia
- Education: Australian Academy of Dramatic Art
- Occupations: Actor, presenter and filmmaker
- Years active: 2005–present
- Spouse(s): Sabina Pitić (m. 2010; div. 2022) Gamze Özçelik (m. 2024)
- Children: 3

Reshad Strik (born 22 June 1981) is a Bosnian-Australian actor and filmmaker.

== Biography and career ==
Strik was born on 22 June 1981 in Canberra, Australia to a Bosnian Muslim father and an Australian mother, he was raised on Central Coast of New South Wales and attended the Australian Academy of Dramatic Art (now the Australian Institute of Music - Dramatic Arts) where he graduated from in 2004.

Casting directors from the hit series headLand spotted him and offered him an ensemble lead role in the popular series. After shooting 70 episodes the show came to an end and Strik seized the opportunity to work in Los Angeles.

Strik made his leading debut in Hong Kong director Fruit Chan's psychological thriller Don't Look Up. He also played Mickey an American soldier in Wes Craven's The Hills Have Eyes 2 for 20th Century Fox. Strik appeared as a rebellious surfer in the Australian film Newcastle, which debuted at the 2008 Tribeca Film Festival. He featured in the Jonathan Schwartz-produced independent film Spooner opposite Nora Zehetner and Matthew Lillard and also the vimeo sensation SCI-FI "STASIS", directed by Christian Swegal. Co-starring with Strik were Beau Bridges and Ernie Hudson.

He also appeared as the male love interest in "A Public Affair", a music video by pop singer Jessica Simpson that features various cameos of actors and singers.

In 2010 Strik married in his father's native city Sarajevo, Bosnia and Herzegovina. There he spent time learning his father's native language and producing and directing music videos and commercials. Strik also completed two feature films in Bosnia and Herzegovina, Crossroads with acclaimed Turkish indie director Faysal Soysal and the Bosnian film Ja sam iz Krajine, zemlje kestena, which was released in 2013.

In 2013, he met with Turkish producers. Not knowing a word of Turkish, Strik was invited to Turkey's cinema and TV industry. Seizing this opportunity, he took intensive language classes. Strik has now acted in TV series Filinta, and played the role of Claudius in TRT1's Diriliş: Ertuğrul.

Strik divorced in 2022 and spends time between Istanbul documentary filmmaking and Sarajevo spending time with his 3 children. He married Gamze Özçelik in 2024.

== Filmography ==
Year	Title	Role	Notes
2005	Blue Heelers	Tony Peroni	Episode: "Everything a Girl Could Want"
2005–2006	headLand	Andy Llewellyn	58 episodes
2007	The Hills Have Eyes 2	Mickey	
2008	Newcastle	Victor	
2009	Spooner	Jack	
2009	Don't Look Up	Marcus Reed	
2010	Stasis	Henry Archer	Short
2010	3 Apartments	Ted	
2013	3 Yol		
2013	Ja sam iz Krajine, zemlje kestena	Omer mladi	
2013	The Wound	Serge	Short
2013	Cross Roads		Short
2014–2015	Filinta	Zülfü	26 episodes
2015	Dig		11 episodes
2015	Diriliş: Ertuğrul	Claudius/Umar	TV series
2016	Islamophobia		
2017	Papillon	Prison Guard #4	
2017	Kervan 1915	Seyit Osman	
2023	Sevap / Mitzvah	JDC Representative	

== Filmmaking ==
- Dragon Ball Futon / short film (2003)
- You Can Get it Anywhere / short film (2006)
- The Hills Have Eyes 2 (2007)
- A man worth knowing / commercial series (2011)
- Dah Ljubavi / music video (2012)
- The Prophet in my Life / documentary (2012)
- Tom Waterhouse / sketch comedy (2013)
- Brad Pitt - Chanel no 5 / sketch comedy (2013)
- NorthPole / sketch comedy (2013)
- Ludwig von Sarajevo / short film (2016)
- Hard Jobs: Reshad Strik / TV documentary (2022–2023)

== Other links ==
- Reshad Strik at IMDb
