= Ghost Theater =

- Poster
- 劇場霊
- Directed by: Hideo Nakata
- Screenplay by: Junya Kato; Ryuta Miyake
- Story by: Hideo Nakata
- Based on: Don't Look Up by Hideo Nakata
- Produced by: Yasushi Akimoto
- Starring: Haruka Shimazaki; Mantaro Koichi; Rika Adachi; Riho Takada; Keita Machida; Ikuji Nakamura
- Music by: Kenji Kawai
- Production company: Django Films
- Distributed by: Shochiku
- Release dates: October 5, 2015 (BIFF); November 21, 2015 (Japan)
- Running time: 99 minutes
- Country: Japan
- Language: Japanese
- Box office: ¥57.2 million

Ghost Theater (劇場霊, Gekijourei) is a 2015 Japanese horror film directed by Hideo Nakata and a remake of Don't Look Up (1996). It was released on November 21, 2015.

In May 2018, an anthology series based on the film was released in the United States on Toku.

== Synopsis ==
Sara (Haruka Shimazaki) is a young actress who gained her a small role in a stage play directed by Gota Nishikino (Mantaro Koichi). Sara is admired by the leading actresses Aoi (Riho Takada) and Kaori (Rika Adachi), who are practicing hard every day. But then, a female staff member is found dead in the theater. While the police are investigating the situation, Aoi falls down from a balcony and loses consciousness. Due to her injuries she won't be able to play the leading role, Gota gives the part to Sara to take over her lead role. But Sara has got to learn very soon that having the leading role is not to her advantage as she learns that somebody or something is trying to end the production at all cost, which puts Sara in deadly danger.

== Cast ==
- Haruka Shimazaki as Sara
- Mantaro Koichi as Gota Nishikino
- Rika Adachi as Kaori
- Riho Takada as Aoi
- Keita Machida as Izumi
- Ikuji Nakamura

== Release ==
The film was part of the Midnight Passion section of the 20th Busan International Film Festival.

== Reception ==
=== Box office ===
The film grossed ¥57.2 million on its opening weekend in Japan.

=== Critical response ===
Maggie Lee of Variety responded negatively to the film, stating that "Hideo Nakata sinks to new lows with this creaky and vacuous backstage thriller."
