= The Mandela Effect (film) =

2019 film directed by David Guy Levy

- Theatrical release poster
- Directed by: David Guy Levy
- Screenplay by: David Guy Levy; Steffen Schlachtenhaufen
- Produced by: Joshua Fruehling; David Guy Levy; Steffen Schlachtenhaufen
- Starring: Charlie Hofheimer; Aleksa Palladino; Robin Lord Taylor; Clarke Peters; Madeleine McGraw
- Cinematography: Matthew Chuang; Mike Testin
- Edited by: Anthony M. Ocasio III
- Music by: Ohad Benchetrit; Justin Small
- Production company: Periscope Entertainment
- Distributed by: Gravitas Ventures
- Release date: 23 October 2019 (United States)
- Running time: 80 minutes
- Country: United States
- Language: English

The Mandela Effect is a 2019 science fiction horror film written and directed by David Guy Levy, starring Charlie Hofheimer as a father grieving for the loss of his daughter. The character becomes obsessed with facts and events that many people remember incorrectly. Aleksa Palladino plays his also-grieving wife, while Robin Lord Taylor plays his best friend and brother-in-law, and Clarke Peters plays a washed-up scientist. The movie is titled after the eponymous psychological phenomenon.

The Mandela Effect premiered at the Other Worlds Film Festival in October 2019, and was released in the United States in December, by Gravitas Ventures.

== Plot ==
Computer game designer Brendan and his wife, Claire, are grieving for their daughter Sam, who drowned trying to retrieve her Curious George doll from the ocean. As they reluctantly rummage through Sam's belongings, Brendan finds a copy of The Berenstain Bears. To the bewilderment of Brendan and his brother-in-law Matt, they remember the title with "Berenstein," even though they find no evidence that it was ever changed. This leads them to learn about many other examples of the Mandela Effect, collectively shared "false memories". Brendan and Claire discover further discrepancies, such as clearly remembering that Sam's doll had a tail when it actually does not.

Eventually, Brendan concludes that the discrepancies are due to shifts between parallel universes and that Sam is still alive in one of them. Despite objections from Claire and Matt, he tracks down Dr. Roland Fuchs, a scientist who has been ostracized for holding similar beliefs about reality. Dr. Fuchs's research indicates that the universe is a computer simulation, with the Mandela Effect the result of reality being rewritten to prevent its inhabitants from perceiving it as a simulation. They begin developing a special computer program that, when run on the quantum computer at Dr. Fuchs' old campus, could interrupt the simulation.

This revelation takes a toll on Brendan's mental health and marriage. He starts to have visions of Sam, which at first no one else sees, until one day she is suddenly and inexplicably alive and everyone can perceive her, though Claire soon becomes distraught, believing that Sam should not be there. Disturbed, Brendan visits Dr. Fuchs, only to be informed that he died by suicide two months previous. Having talked to him mere hours before, Brendan decides the alteration in his reality is the simulation's attempt to thwart their plan. He rushes to finish the program, sneaks into the college computer department, accidentally kills a faculty member as he threatens to call security on Brendan, who then steals his badge, enters the control room of the quantum computer, and runs his program. He then rushes home as glitches manifest and destabilize reality. His family hold each other tightly while the entire simulation crashes.

The simulation restarts, recreating the history of the universe. The family is shown at the beach again, but this time Brendan asks Sam to leave her Curious George doll — now without a tail — before going to the water. This saves Sam's life and allows the simulation to continue beyond the event that originally led to its discovery and crash.

== Cast ==
- Charlie Hofheimer as Brendan
- Aleksa Palladino as Claire
- Robin Lord Taylor as Matt, brother-in-law
- Clarke Peters as Dr. Fuchs
- Madeleine McGraw as Sam
- Tim Ransom as Pastor Isaac
- Ptolemy Slocum as Dr. Manning
- Vernee Watson as Nadine
- Elena Campbell-Martinez as Ms. Garcia
- Steven Daniel Brun as Adam
- Salme Geransar as Nasim Terhani

== Release ==
The Mandela Effect premiered at the Other Worlds Film Festival on October 23, 2019, and was released in the United Kingdom on December 6, 2019, by Gravitas Ventures.

The film was released in theaters, as well as on VOD, on December 6, 2019.

== Reception ==
=== Box office ===
The Mandela Effect had a very limited release, primarily distributed through VOD.

=== Critical response ===
The film received generally negative reviews from critics. On Rotten Tomatoes, it has an approval rating of 20% based on reviews from five critics, with an average rating of 4/10.

Noah Murray wrote for The Los Angeles Times that "...for the most part this movie is a tightly constructed and sensitively rendered conversation-starter, comparing grief and loss to the sensation of faulty memories. It takes a strange and fascinating meme, and makes it personal."

Josh Goller at Spectrum Culture wrote "Do you remember that ‘90s movie starring Sinbad as a genie? Didn’t Curious George used to have a tail? And when did Jiffy peanut butter shorten its brand name by two letters? If you’ve ever had these thoughts, you’ve experienced the sort of collective misremembering that’s become known as the Mandela Effect. David Guy Levy’s film of the same name taps into the sensational weirdness of this cultural phenomenon, which some have pointed to as evidence of slipping between parallel worlds in a multiverse or a glitch in a simulated reality. But The Mandela Effect spends far too much time on dry exposition, leaving little room for character development or a compelling narrative."

== See also ==
Bête Noire (Black Mirror)
