= Manny & Lo =

- Directed by: Lisa Krueger
- Written by: Lisa Krueger
- Produced by: Marlen Hecht; Dean Silvers; Klaus Volkenborn (Executive)
- Starring: Scarlett Johansson; Aleksa Palladino; Mary Kay Place
- Cinematography: Tom Krueger
- Edited by: Colleen Sharp
- Music by: John Lurie
- Distributed by: Sony Pictures Classics
- Release date: July 26, 1996
- Running time: 88 minutes
- Country: United States
- Language: English
- Budget: $500,000
- Box office: $502,313

Manny & Lo is a 1996 American comedy-drama film directed by Lisa Krueger and starring Scarlett Johansson, Aleksa Palladino, and Mary Kay Place.

== Plot ==
Two sisters, 11-year-old Amanda (nicknamed Manny) and 15-year-old Laurel (nicknamed Lo), run away from several foster homes after the death of their mother, sleeping wherever they can, including in model homes. But when Lo realizes she's pregnant, the two find that they can't make it through this crisis on their own. With nowhere else to turn, they decide to kidnap Elaine, a clerk at a baby supply store. But it seems that Elaine just may need Manny and Lo as much as they need her.

== Cast ==
- Scarlett Johansson as Manny
- Aleksa Palladino as Lo
- Mary Kay Place as Elaine
- Dean Silvers as Suburban Family
- Marlen Hecht as Suburban Family
- Forrest Silvers as Suburban Family
- Tyler Silvers as Suburban Family
- Lisa Campion as Convenience Store Clerk
- Glenn Fitzgerald as Joey
- Novella Nelson as Georgine
- Susan Decker as Baby Store Customer #1
- Marla Zuk as Baby Store Customer #2
- Bonnie Johnson as Baby Store Customer #3
- Melissa Johnson as Child
- Angie Phillips as Connie
- Cameron Boyd as Chuck
- Paul Guilfoyle as Country House Owner
- Tony Arnaud as Sheriff
- Nicholas Lent as Lo's Baby

== Reception ==
Manny and Lo holds a rating of 61% on Rotten Tomatoes based on 23 reviews.
