= Sabina Vajrača =

American film director

- Born: Banja Luka, SR Bosnia and Herzegovina, Yugoslavia
- Occupations: Film director, screenwriter, producer
- Years active: 2005–present

Sabina Vajrača is a Bosnian-American film director, screenwriter, and film producer.

Vajrača is best known for having written, directed and produced the 2005 documentary Back to Bosnia and the 2023 short drama Sevap / Mitzvah.

== Biography ==
Sabina Vajrača was born to a Bosniak family in Banja Luka, Bosnia and Herzegovina, which was then part of the Socialist Federal Republic of Yugoslavia, where she lived until the Bosnian War started in 1992. She started her artistic life as a poet and a short-story writer, completing her first novel at ten years of age. It involved a girl, a dog, and a boy who saves the world. It was a huge hit among her friends.

She started her professional career as a theatre director in New York City before switching to film with her feature documentary Back to Bosnia. Since then, she's written, directed, and produced commercials, music videos, and over a dozen films, including the Warner Bros. period drama Voodoo Macbeth and a short drama Sevap / Mitzvah, which won the Humanitas Prize and the Claims Conference grant, and was the 2024 Academy Awards contender.

Sabina received her M.F.A. in Film and TV Production from USC School of Cinematic Arts. Her thesis film Variables won the Directors Guild of America SFA Grand Prize, and Alfred P. Sloan Foundation grant, and was nominated for the Student British Academy of Film and Television Arts (BAFTA) and Student Academy Awards.

== Film ==
- Back To Bosnia – 2005
- Apparition (2009)
- Smoking Kills (2011)
- Negative Feedback Loop (2017)
- Callback (2018)
- Variables (2019)
- Sevap / Mitzvah (2023)
- Summer Abroad
- For Buraz (planned)

== Television ==
- Generations Matter (ESPN)
