= Edge City (film) =

- Directed by: Eugene Martin
- Written by: Eugene Martin
- Produced by: Eugene Martin; Lisa Rosenstein; Cate Wilson
- Starring: Charlie Hofheimer; Heather Gottlieb; Isidra Vega; Bruce Kirkpatrick
- Cinematography: Michael Pearlman
- Edited by: Juli Vizza
- Music by: Mario Grigorov
- Release date: 1998
- Running time: 101 minutes
- Country: United States
- Language: English

Edge City is a 1998 American drama film written and directed by Eugene Martin and starring Charlie Hofheimer, Heather Gottlieb, Isidra Vega and Bruce Kirkpatrick.

== Cast ==
- Charlie Hofheimer as James
- Heather Gottlieb as Cherie
- Isidra Vega as Tammy
- Ryan Carmony as Bobby
- Todd Berry as Robert
- Luis Laporte Jr. as El
- Mark Webber as Johnny
- Samuel Medina as Little Dave
- Jill Horner as Allison
- Michelle Seabreeze as Suzie
- Christopher Kadish as Tony
- Bruce Kirkpatrick as Ronald
- Tim Dowlin as John
- Sheana Deeny as Michelle
- John Jackson as Gary

== Reception ==
Dennis Harvey of Variety gave the film a negative review and wrote that it "falls short of the distinctive shock value, stylishness or character insight that lent some prior, similar dramas their edge."

== Award ==
The film won the Golden Starfish Award for Best American Independent Film at the Hamptons International Film Festival.
