= Newcastle (film) =

2008 Australian drama film

- Directed by: Dan Castle
- Written by: Dan Castle
- Produced by: Naomi Wenck
- Starring: Lachlan Buchanan; Xavier Samuel; Reshad Strik; Shane Jacobson; Riley Von Husen
- Cinematography: Richard Michalak
- Edited by: Rodrigo Balart
- Music by: Michael Yezerski
- Production company: Australian Film France Corporation
- Distributed by: Wolfe Video
- Release dates: 25 April 2008 (Tribeca Film Festival); 6 November 2008 (Australia)
- Running time: 107 minutes
- Country: Australia
- Language: English

Newcastle is a 2008 Australian drama film set in the city of Newcastle, in New South Wales.

== Plot ==
Young surfer Jesse has always been in the shadow of his older brother Victor, who tried to become a champion surfer and failed. Jesse, his friends — Nathan, Andy and Scotty — and his brother Fergus (who has a crush on Andy, which is reciprocated), along with Deb and Leah, all go on a camping-surfing trip to a remote beach.

But Victor shows up, things get competitive, and tragedy hits: There is a severe accident in which Andy is seriously injured and Victor is killed. After the funeral, Fergus and Jesse bond on a night under the stars, and the film ends on a happier note, with Jesse as a competitor in a junior surf comp.

== Cast ==
- Lachlan Buchanan as Jesse Hoff
- Xavier Samuel as Fergus Hoff
- Reshad Strik as Victor Hoff
- Shane Jacobson as Reggie
- Israel Cannan as Scotty
- Joy Smithers as Flora
- Gigi Edgley as Sandra
- Rebecca Breeds as Leah
- Barry Otto as Gramps
- Kirk Jenkins as Andy
- Anthony Hayes as Danny
- Ben Milliken as Nathan
- James Triglone as Billy
- Debra Ades as Debra
- Zachary Garred as Kurt
- Scott Campbell as Ripley
- Riley Von Husen as Dave

== Reception ==
=== Box office ===
Newcastle grossed $213,563 at the box office in Australia.

=== Critical reception ===
The review aggregator website Rotten Tomatoes reported an approval rating of 61% with an average score of 5.63/10, based on 18 reviews.

== See also ==
- Cinema of Australia
