= Easy Living (2017 film) =

- Poster
- Directed by: Adam Keleman
- Written by: Adam Keleman
- Produced by: Laura Wagner; Adam Keleman
- Starring: Caroline Dhavernas
- Cinematography: James Axel West
- Edited by: Christopher Radcliff; Drew DeNicola
- Music by: Juke
- Production companies: Bay Bridge Productions; Green Ray Films
- Distributed by: Gravitas Ventures
- Release date: September 15, 2017
- Running time: 80 minutes
- Country: United States
- Language: English

Easy Living is a 2017 American thriller comedy-drama film written and directed by Adam Keleman and starring Caroline Dhavernas. It is Keleman's feature directorial debut.

== Cast ==
- Caroline Dhavernas as Sherry Graham
- Elizabeth Marvel as Abby
- Jen Richards as Danny
- McCaleb Burnett as Henry
- Charlie Hofheimer as Norman
- C.J. Wilson as Fred
- Daniel Eric Gold as Ted
- Taylor Richardson as Alice
- Mary Catherine Garrison as Trish

== Release ==
The film was released on September 15, 2017.

== Reception ==
The film has a 78% rating on Rotten Tomatoes based on nine reviews.

Frank Scheck of The Hollywood Reporter gave the film a positive review and wrote, "A character study of an endlessly flawed human being, Easy Living thankfully avoids heavy moralizing or platitudinous bromides and it even makes familiar situations(...)seems fresh."

Alan Ng of Film Threat awarded the film three stars out of five and wrote that the film "is a character study of a real-life Peter Pan, who can’t quite find the doorway into adulthood."

Simi Horwitz of Film Journal International gave the film a positive review and wrote "An exceptional character study of an outlier who lives a Jekyll and Hyde existence in a universe almost devoid of causality."
