= Sevap / Mitzvah =

- Directed by: Sabina Vajrača
- Written by: Sabina Vajrača
- Produced by: Diana Sanela Jenkins; Azra Isaković; Kerim Mašović; Sabina Vajraća
- Starring: Helena Vuković; Magdalena Živaljić Tadić; Sanela Krsmanović-Bistrivoda; Frano Mašković Mačak
- Edited by: Saša Peševski
- Production companies: Kontraplan; Gemini/Snake
- Release date: 30 March 2023
- Running time: 20 minutes
- Countries: United States; Bosnia and Herzegovina

Sevap / Mitzvah (A Good Deed) is a 2023 period drama film written and directed by Sabina Vajrača, and executive produced by Sanela Diana Jenkins and D Empire Entertainment. It is inspired by a true story of Bosnian Muslim and Jewish families that save each other's lives.

The film stars Helena Vuković, Adnan Hasković, Sanela Krsmanović-Bistrivoda, Magdalena Živaljić Tadić, Muhamed Hadžović, Reshad Strik and Rijad Gvozden.

Sevap / Mitzvah had its world premiere on March 30, 2023.

== Plot ==
The film is based on a true event, and it is about the Muslim Hardaga family who saved the Jewish Kabiljo family in 1941 Nazi-occupied Bosnia during the Second World War. 50 years later, during the Serbian aggression on Bosnia and Herzegovina, the Kabiljo family rescues the Hardaga family from a besieged Sarajevo.

== Cast ==
- Helena Vuković as Zejneba Hardaga
- Sanela Krsmanović-Bistrivoda as Bahra Hardaga
- Magdalena Živaljić Tadić as Rifka Kabiljo
- Adnan Hasković as Mustafa Hardaga
- Muhamed Hadžović as Izet Hardaga
- Frano Mašković Mačak as Josef Kabiljo
- Rijad Gvozden as Ivica
- Emina Muftić as Older Zejneba Hardaga
- Jasna Buha as Older Rifka Kabiljo
- Snežana Vidović as Aida Hardaga
- Reshad Strik JDC Representative

== Reception and awards ==
Sonia McCloud of Film-Business gave the film 4 stars, saying “Writer and director Sabina Vajraća has created a masterpiece that captures the true essence of those most harrowing events.” FilmThreat’s Alan Ng said “the performances stand out” and “Vukovic carries the film.” Valerie Milano of The Hollywood Times stated Sevap / Mitzvah “is a must-watch film showcasing humanity’s true essence.”

Sevap / Mitzvah won the Humanitas Prize for Short Film in 2023 by Humanitas, the organization that annually honors film and television writers whose work best explores the human condition.

The film has won multiple awards at film festivals including the Audience Award at Italy's 2023 Sedicicorto International Film Festival, the International Vision Award at the 2023 Flickers' Rhode Island International Film Festival, and Best Female Focus Jury Award at the 2023 Cordillera International Film Festival. Also in 2023, Sevap / Mitzvah won the Short film Human Rights Fiction award at Ecocine International Environmental and Human Rights Film Festival in Brazil, and Gratitude Award Fiction Short at the Centre Film Festival in State College, Pennsylvania.

Sevap / Mitzvah qualified to be considered for a 2024 Academy Award.
