= Don't Look Up (1996 film) =

1996 Japanese film by Hideo Nakata

- Japanese film poster

Japanese name
- Kanji: 女優霊
- Literal meaning: Ghost Actress
Transcriptions
- Revised Hepburn: Joyû-rei
- Directed by: Hideo Nakata
- Screenplay by: Hiroshi Takahashi
- Story by: Hideo Nakata
- Produced by: Sento Takenori
- Starring: Yurei Yanagi; Yasuyo Shirashima; Kei Ishibashi
- Cinematography: Takeshi Hamada
- Edited by: Shuichi Kakesu
- Music by: Akifumi Kawamura
- Production companies: Bandai Visual; Bitters End; Wowow
- Distributed by: Bitters End
- Release date: March 2, 1996 (Japan)
- Running time: 73 minutes
- Country: Japan
- Language: Japanese

Don't Look Up (女優霊, joyū rei; lit. Ghost Actress) is a 1996 Japanese horror film directed by Hideo Nakata. The film is set in a film studio where a drama film is being made.

The film was made by Hideo Nakata while trying to fund production for his documentary film about director Joseph Losey. It was not a success in Japan but prompted an English-language remake in 2009, which was directed by Fruit Chan. The film also influenced the creative choices Nakata would have for his popular film Ring in 1998, as well as the sequel of Ju-On entitled Ju-On: The Grudge 2, which loosely based on after the film.

== Plot ==
First-time director Toshio Murai is trying to finish principal photography for a drama. When screening the result of the day’s shoot, Murai and the crew find that their negatives are intermingled with undeveloped footage from an old film. In the footage, a pale, long-haired woman in white is seen standing in the background of a scene, then laughing hysterically, out of focus.

Murai begins seeing the ghost on location, while his seasoned lead actress Hitomi Kurokawa, on whom he has a crush, senses a presence that repeats her lines during a reading. Murai learns that crewmembers have reported a ghostly sighting in their studio during a previous shoot and witnesses Kurokawa’s agent fleeing in fear after handing her a protective charm. One day, during a take, Murai sees the ghost lurking behind teenage actor Saori Mochizuki when she is playing around on the rigs above the set. She suddenly falls to her death, temporarily shutting down production.

Murai learns that the old film to which the undeveloped footage belonged was not released because the actress in the scene had fallen to her death during production, too. However, he remembers being terrified of the film when he saw it on TV as a child and noticed that it was shot in the same studio he and his crew are using now.

When shooting resumes, Kurokawa sees an apparition of Mochizuki, and the actress replacing Mochizuki gets possessed. She falls into a hysterical frenzy. Afterward, more crewmembers report ghostly apparitions suggesting that the project is cursed and urge Murai to shut it down. However, he insists that they finish. After seeing the ghost stalking Kurokawa’s character in the footage of the day, Murai fears for her life and rushes back to the studio. There, he is tormented by the ghost, who ends up dragging him away while laughing hysterically.

Following Murai’s disappearance, the crew struggles to finish the film. When visiting Murai’s apartment with a crewmember to look for clues, Kurokawa realizes in horror that she noticed the ghost through a mirror.

== Cast ==
- Yūrei Yanagi as Toshio Murai, the director
- Yasuyo Shirashima as Hitomi Kurokawa, the seasoned actress
- Kei Ishibashi as Saori Mochizuki, the debuting actress
- Ren Osugi as Ootani, the cinematographer (as Ren Oosugi)
- Takanori Kikuchi as Masaru Hayama
- Hiroyuki Tanaka as Sekikawa (as Sabu)
- Reita Serizawa as Sadaoka

== Production ==
Prior to working on Don't Look Up, Hideo Nakata joined the Japanese film company Nikkatsu in the 1980s. In the 1970s, Nikkatsu was predominantly producing pornography films in the Roman Porno (Romantic Pornography) genre. By the time Nakata joined Nikkatsu in the 1980s, the company had been struggling as the availability of home video made theatrical pornography wane in popularity. In 1991, Nakata left Nikkatsu and Japan to study the British Free Cinema movement in London's National Film Archive. When Nikkatsu collapsed in 1993, Nakata did not have a job to return to and decided to develop an independent film on director Joseph Losey. To help gain money for the documentary took various film jobs for hire, including returning to directing in Japan where he began developing the film Don't Look Up for J-Movie Wars, a subsidiary of a major Japanese satellite television company.

The majority of the film was shot on the abandoned stages of Nikkatsu.

== Release ==
Don't Look Up ran for six weeks in a limited release in Japan. Hideo Nakata stated that only about 800 people attended these screenings. It was released on video in Japan on March 6, 1996.

=== Remake ===
In 2003, the South African-based company Distant Horizon purchased the rights to Don't Look Up, initially with Hideo Nakata to direct the film again. In 2007, Variety announced that Fruit Chan would direct this English-language remake of Don't Look Up. The remake was shown at the 2009 Lund Fantastisk Film Festival in Sweden and was later released on DVD in the United States in 2010.

Hideo Nakata's film Ghost Theater was promoted as a remake of Don't Look Up. Maggie Lee (Variety) noted in her review of the film that "the only thing the two films have in common is a malevolent female entity that hates rising actresses."

== Reception ==
For his work on the film, Hideo Nakata won the Best New Director award at the 1997 Michinoku International Mystery Film Festival. Nakata later felt that he showed too much of the phantoms's face in the film. Josh Ralske (AllMovie) praised Nakata's confidence in the film, stating that he "clearly understands his milieu (it takes place on a film set) and is assured enough to let the tension build very slowly", while noting that there "are times, in fact, when the movie seems to be going nowhere" and that this lead Ralske to feel that the screenplay felt unfinished, concluding that the film "promises a more chilling film than Nakata has delivered.

Nakata continued that "I've had people tell me 'Don't Look Up wasn't exactly frightening, it was...' For me, of all the possible adjectives that could finish that phrase, the word I most long to hear is 'frightening' That's the description I want to elicit." These reactions influenced Nakata's later film Ring (1998), where he decided to cover up the ghost's face completely.

== See also ==
- List of ghost films
- List of horror films of 1996
- List of Japanese films of 1996
- Don't Look Up (2009), the American remake
