= The Adventures of Sebastian Cole =

1998 American comedy-drama film by Tod Williams

- Theatrical release poster
- Directed by: Tod Williams
- Written by: Tod Williams
- Produced by: Karen Barber; Jasmine Kosovic
- Starring: Adrian Grenier; Clark Gregg; Aleksa Palladino; Margaret Colin; John Shea
- Cinematography: John Foster
- Edited by: Affonso Gonçalves
- Music by: Elizabeth Swados
- Production company: Culpan Productions LLC
- Distributed by: Paramount Classics
- Release dates: September 11, 1998 (TIFF); August 6, 1999 (United States)
- Running time: 96 minutes
- Country: United States
- Language: English
- Box office: $100,841

The Adventures of Sebastian Cole is a 1998 American teen comedy-drama film written and directed by Tod Williams and starring Adrian Grenier as the title character.

The Adventures of Sebastian Cole premiered at the Toronto International Film Festival on September 11, 1998 and was released by Paramount Classics on August 6, 1999. The film received mixed reviews from critics and grossed $100,841 at the box office.

== Plot ==
In June 1983 in Dutchess County, New York, Sebastian Cole's stepmother, who formerly went by Hank and presented as male, outs herself and announces that she is having a sex change operation. Sebastian's sister, Jessica, leaves immediately for California, and his mother, Joan, takes him back to England. Eight months later, Sebastian is back in the United States, knocking on his stepmother's door. Now named Henrietta, she takes Sebastian in and supports him over the next few months of high school. Sebastian's "adventures" are mostly self-destructive.

== Cast ==
- Adrian Grenier as Sebastian Cole
- Clark Gregg as Hank / Henrietta Rossi
- Aleksa Palladino as Mary
- Margaret Colin as Joan Cole
- John Shea as Hartley
- Marni Lustig as Jessica Cole
- Joan Copeland as Grandma Cole
- Tom Lacy as Grandpa Cole
- Gabriel Macht as Troy
- Russel Harper as Wayne
- Rory Cochrane as Chinatown
- Famke Janssen as Fiona
- Nicole Ari Parker as Nurse Jenny
- Marisol Padilla Sánchez as Woman in Desert
- Levon Helm as Bob

== Reception ==
On Rotten Tomatoes, the film has an approval rating of 43% based on reviews from 23 critics, with an average rating of 5.8/10.

Roger Ebert gave the film three out of four stars, noting that the film avoids easy cliche in favour of a more thoughtful approach to the subject matter. He gave particular praise to Clark Gregg saying that, whilst one is never in doubt about his gender because of his physical appearance, "in his heart he knows he is a woman, and he is true to that inner conviction with a courage that the film doesn't need to underline, because it permeates the performance". Stephen Holden of The New York Times praised Adrian Greiner's performance feeling that it "beautifully captures his character's precarious balance of naivete and bravado, self-destructiveness and self-invention".

Writing in Variety, Joe Leydon believed that the scenes between Gregg and Grenier were the strongest (although he felt that Gregg's portrayal came close to caricature). He was critical of the technical aspects of the film's production, felt that other films had covered similar ground better and that the ending was poorly conceived and too abrupt. He predicted that the film would perform poorly with critics and at the box office. Entertainment Weekly's Owen Gleiberman gave the film a "B" rating, adding that he wished it had been better structured, although the current configuration was "integral" to its "charm".

== See also ==
- List of American films of 1998
- Transgender in film and television
