= Salme Geransar =

Iranian-Australian actress

Salme Geransar is an Iranian–Australian actress and artist. She is known for her roles in the 2019 sci-fi thriller The Mandela Effect; Neighbours (2020); Clickbait (2021); and as Anousha in the ABC series Mystery Road: Origin (2022). She appeared in the 2024 Melbourne Theatre Company's production of English.

== Early life and education ==
Salme Geransar was born in Tehran, Iran. She moved to Australia with her family at the age of four, and grew up on the Central Coast of New South Wales. She played the piano as a child, and enjoyed the arts and mathematics at school.

She studied biotechnology at the University of Newcastle, before taking time out to try acting. She did a three-year full-time acting course at the Australian Academy of Dramatic Art (AADA) in Sydney, graduating in 2006.

Since then she has also done various other courses in acting and the dramatic arts in Australia and the United States, including at the 16th Street Actors Studio in Melbourne, the Upright Citizens Brigade (2016) and Anthony Meindl's Actor Workshop (2018), both in Los Angeles.

== Career ==
=== Screen ===
Geransar moved to Melbourne, and featured in the lead guest roles first in the Network 10 police drama series Rush, and then in the TV drama series Winners & Losers. She won accolades for her portrayal of an Iranian woman who finds herself in a bad situation after fleeing as a refugee, in the 2013 short film Wish. She has since appeared in many roles on the big screen as well as television.

In 2014, she moved to the U.S. to pursue her acting career, and lived in Los Angeles for almost five years.

After playing a number of dramatic roles, she was cast in the comedy feature Izzy Gets the Fuck Across Town alongside Mackenzie Davis. Directed by Christian Papierniak, the film premiered at the 2017 LA Film Festival, and the 2019 sci-fi thriller The Mandela Effect.

She played Detective Majano in the Netflix series Clickbait (2021) and Anousha in the ABC series Mystery Road: Origin (2022) for which she along with the rest of the cast received the 2023 Equity Ensemble Award for Outstanding Performance by an Ensemble in a Drama Series.

=== Stage ===
While studying at AADA, Geransar performed on stage many times at the Pilgrim Theatre, and has had a few roles on stage since, including in Steven Berkoff's Decadence (2008, 2009) and Neil Simon's California Suite in 2018.

She starred in the 2024 Melbourne Theatre Company's production of the Pulitzer prize-winning play English, which met with excellent reviews when it played in Melbourne and Canberra. The production was nominated for Outstanding Ensemble and Outstanding Production at the 2025 Green Room Awards.

== Personal life ==
Geransar is fluent in English, Persian, and Spanish.

Since late 2023, she has been pursuing her passion for art, with her work featured in the Melbourne Eclectic Art Show by the Fitzroy Art Collective in 2024, Black Cat Fitzroy in 2024, and Untether Gallery, Geelong in 2025.

Salme Geransar is a rising martial artist. She has trained in Muay Thai and Aikido. She has demonstrated skills in weapon fighting such as the use of bo staff, jo and bokken. Salme has her Shodan black belt in Iwama Ryu Aikido.

== Filmography ==
=== Film ===
Year	Title	Role	Notes
2025	We Bury the Dead	Private Clarkson	
2019	The Mandela Effect	Nasim Terhani	
2017	Izzy Gets the Fuck Across Town	The Gypsy	
2008	The Plex	Misty	

=== Television ===
Year	Title	Role	Notes
2025	The Imposter	Detective Allen	Episode: "1.4"
2024	Swift Street	Vivienne	Episode: "Rental"
2022	Mystery Road: Origin	Anousha	Main cast (6 episodes)
2021	Spreadsheet	Tash	Episode: "Lipstick and Nits"
2021	Clickbait	Detective Majano	Recurring (6 episodes)
2020	Neighbours	Kayla Gold	Episode: "1.8428"
2013	Winners & Losers	Amita Chaves	Episode: "You Can Run"
2010	Rush	Ara	Episode: "3.14"
