= Red Dirt (film) =

- Film poster
- Directed by: Tag Purvis
- Written by: Tag Purvis
- Produced by: Cyril Bijaoui
- Starring: Dan Montgomery Jr. Aleksa Palladino; Walton Goggins; Karen Black; Peg O'Keef; Glenn Shadix; Virgil Cunningham; Jo-Ann Robinson
- Cinematography: Ted Cohen
- Edited by: Nicholas 'Nikko' Tsiotsias
- Music by: Nathan Barr
- Release date: March 17, 2000 (United States)
- Running time: 107 minutes
- Country: United States
- Language: English

Red Dirt is a 2000 American Southern Gothic drama film written and directed by Tag Purvis and starring Dan Montgomery Jr., Aleksa Palladino, Walton Goggins, and Karen Black. The film follows the life of Griffith, from a simpleton farm boy, happy and contented with his life, to an ambitious young man, focused on discovering the world. A stranger stumbles into his home and only sharpens the young man's intent to travel and discover.

== Plot ==
Griffith (Dan Montgomery Jr.) has lived all his life in the fictional town of Pine Apple, Mississippi. He spends most of his time barefoot on the red dirt and has a hobby of tracing the epitaphs on headstones. He was orphaned as a child when his parents drowned inside their car in the river under mysterious circumstances. He was raised by his eccentric aunt Summer (Karen Black) and uncle Charlie.

Summer is mentally unstable and agoraphobic, apparently a result of the death of Griffith's parents. She and her only other living sister, Lynn Thomas (Peg O'Keef), have avoided each other for years for unknown reasons. Charlie (who died of cancer when Griffith was 14) once regularly sent Summer off to a mental asylum, being unable to deal with her eccentric behavior. She resumed living in the house after Charlie's death, cared for by Griffith and the family matriarch, Lily Mae.

Griffith's only other close relationship is with Lynn's daughter, his first cousin Emily (Aleksa Palladino), with whom he also has occasional sexual relationships.

The film is set shortly after the death of Lily Mae, when Griffith becomes solely responsible for caring for his aunt. Griffith resents this, feeling trapped in his environment and longing to leave. Emily does not want him to leave. She accuses Griffith of wanting to abandon her and his responsibilities to Aunt Summer. Emily herself has no wish to leave Pine Apple, even though her own mother practically pushes her to.

Griffith is nevertheless determined to leave. He starts cleaning up the cottage previously used by Lily Mae with the intention of renting it out. A day after he hangs the 'For Rent' sign, a stranger from Louisiana arrives and inquires about the cottage. He introduces himself as Lee Todd (Walton Goggins). Griffith agrees to let Lee stay in the cottage for free in return for helping him finish painting it, despite the objections of both Summer and Emily.

The two quickly become friends. They paint a barn roof with Emily's name and phone number and they start building a giant replica of a pincushion in memory of Lily Mae. Griffith is intrigued by Lee's experiences during his travels. Lee, in turn, urges Griffith to leave Pine Apple and see the world. He offers to take Griffith with him. Griffith agrees and they make a blood oath.

Emily senses the growing closeness between the two. Feeling left out, she starts spending time with Summer. The two develop an unlikely friendship. Summer sees herself in Emily, senses her doubts and her repressed desire to leave. She also urges Emily to leave Pine Apple, but Emily dismisses this. Emily also voices her suspicions to Summer that Griffith and Lee were becoming more than friends. Summer admits to having the same suspicions but does not want to interfere, believing that she had already stood in Griffith's way enough.

Emily confronts Lee and tries to convince him to leave Griffith alone. Lee refuses, telling her that he believes it's best for Griffith to leave Pine Apple.

Summer thrives in the company of Emily, who convinces her to finally get out of the house and try to get over her agoraphobia. Driving out on country roads, they chance upon Lee and Griffith, who have just finished building the replica of Lily Mae's pincushion in the middle of a field. The sight of it finally triggers closure on Summer's part, setting her on the path to recovery.

While bathing in the river that afternoon, Lee tells Griffith that they should be leaving soon for Texas. Griffith agrees but asks for one more week to prepare. That night, Griffith asks permission from Summer to leave. Summer encourages him. She asks him not to worry about her but she also betrays guilt over Griffith's childhood, something Griffith can still not understand.

Emily catches Lee putting away stuff for storage and learns that Lee and Griffith are leaving together. She confronts Griffith and confesses that she loves him, the reason she didn't want to leave. Griffith tells her it isn't enough anymore and that he has to leave.

Summer asks Emily to drive her to her sister. During their conversation the reasons for their alienation became clear. The death of Griffith's parents was not an accident. Summer had been having an affair with her late sister's husband and Griffith is actually Summer's son. Although Summer gave him up to her sister (who couldn't conceive), it didn't prevent the eventual breakdown of her sister's marriage. They gave Griffith back to Summer and committed suicide by driving off a bridge. Lynn blames Summer for their sister's death. Summer is wracked by guilt over it but is still thankful that she got to take care of Griffith after all.

Meanwhile, Emily confronts Griffith for the final time, openly accusing him of being gay. Griffith becomes angry and unthinkingly tries to rape her in an attempt to prove his heterosexuality. He stops himself in time and runs away into the rain. Griffith finds Lee and accuses him of lying to him about his intentions. Lee tells him what has been obvious, that deep inside Griffith knew that it was already something more than friendship. Griffith denies it vehemently and punches Lee when he tries to kiss him. Griffith goes home and shuts himself in his room.

The following day, Lee visits Emily to say goodbye. He finds Emily packing her things. She has decided to leave Pine Apple for New Orleans. They finally admit to each other that they both love Griffith. Before Lee leaves, Emily assures him that Griffith does love him.

After Lee has left town, Summer finally admits to Griffith that she is his real mother. Griffith is initially incredulous but eventually believes her. In doing so, he finally realizes he doesn't need to run away after all, that he actually belongs to Pine Apple. He sets fire to the giant pincushion, which was to him a symbol of his desire to leave. He also makes up with Emily before she leaves for New Orleans, after bidding a tearful goodbye to Summer.

Lee unexpectedly returns shortly after. Griffith receives him warmly but they carefully avoid the subject of their previous fight. As Lee is turning away to leave for the final time, Griffith finally gets the courage to admit that he loves him back and kisses him. Lee drives him back to Summer's house.

Griffith opts to remain in Pine Apple with Summer. He and Lee read a poem inscribed on Lily Mae's headstone to each other and part with the implication of keeping in touch.

Forever and a day and the blood of man, stained red the dirt of the Mississippi land. And in this journey we go, but in this place we’ll stay. If only in the heart, where memory of love, eternally remains.

== Production ==
Red Dirt was the first film by Tag Purvis. It was filmed in Meridian, Mississippi, United States.

== Awards ==
Red Dirt won Best Dramatic Feature in the Chicago Gay and Lesbian Film Festival & Best Film in the Pittsburgh Gay and Lesbian Film Festival. Tag Purvis won Best Director in the Beverly Hills International Film Festival.

Karen Black and Walton Goggins also won Best Female Actor and Best Actor for their roles as Summer and Lee Todd respectively in the Slam Dunk Film Festival.
