= Australian Institute of Music – Dramatic Arts =

Australian drama school

Coordinates: 33°52′24″S 151°12′29″E

- Former name: Australian Academy of Dramatic Art (1983–2013)
- Type: Subsidiary
- Established: 1983; 43 years ago
- Parent institution: Australian Institute of Music
- Location: Sydney CBD, New South Wales, Australia
- Campus: Urban
- Website: Official website
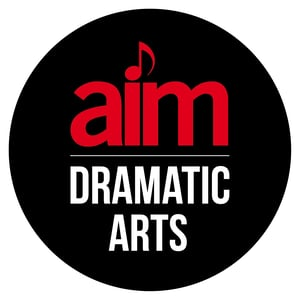

The Australian Institute of Music – Dramatic Arts (AIMDA), formerly known as the Australian Academy of Dramatic Art (AADA), is a drama school in Sydney. It offers a degree in acting and theatre-making as a department of the Australian Institute of Music (AIM).

== History ==
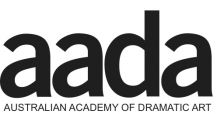
Logo for the Australian Academy of Dramatic Art, the former name of the Australian Institute of Music – Dramatic Arts.

AIM Dramatic Arts was formerly known as the Australian Academy of Dramatic Art (AADA) and was established in 1983. It became the first private drama school in Australia to gain State vocational education accreditation, in 1987. In 2006, AADA became a department of the Australian Institute of Music (AIM), and in 2013 was rebranded as Australian Institute of Music – Dramatic Arts. From 2007, Andrew Davidson was the Head of the School, and in 2013 Peta Downes took over as Head of Dramatic Arts.

=== The degree ===
In 2007, consultation with the theatre industry began to create a unique, university-level qualification. The growing independent theatre scene in Sydney and other Australian capitals was now to be supported by a custom-built training in contemporary theatre practice, "a unique education for the Actor / Creator / Producer". The school took the baton from the University of Western Sydney's now-defunct Theatre Nepean, a training program that gave the Australian performing arts sector over a decade of graduates who are all-round theatre makers. In 2009, the department accepted its first intake of students in the new Bachelor of Performance degree.

=== Placement ===
Students undertake a unique interaction with a creative workplace and, often, a future employer. They are matched with leading performing arts companies in Sydney, during or following their final trimester of study. Placement Partners include: Bell Shakespeare, Channel 7, Darlinghurst Theatre Company, Fountainhead Casting, Griffin Theatre, Performance Space, Playwriting Australia, Powerhouse, Shopfront, Sport for Jove, Sydney Theatre Company, Tamarama Rock Surfers, and Version 1.0.

== Campuses ==
=== Australian Institute of Music ===
Main Campus is located at the Australian Institute of Music, 1–15 Foveaux Street, Surry Hills. Established in 1968 by the late Peter Calvo, the campus of the Australian Institute of Music has grown since the 1990s to house two concert halls, a black box theatre, four dance and drama studios, and multiple classroom, rehearsal and practice spaces.

=== Pilgrim House ===
Teaching and performances took place at the historic Pilgrim Theatre, located in Pilgrim House at 262 Pitt Street, Sydney until early 2017. Built in the Italian Palazzo style in 1927-8, the theatre was used as a broadcast and recording hall for live radio during the Great Depression. It was host to international performers, including Noël Coward, in the 1940s. The Australian Broadcasting Corporation and 2GB Radio were tenants until the 1970s. Throughout the 1990s, Sydney Art Theatre was the resident company.

The school's lease began in 2004 and finished in May 2017. The Dramatic Arts department is now situated at AIM's main campus, 1–15 Foveaux Street, Surry Hills.

== Notable productions ==
- Blackrock – opened 12 May 2004
- 13 – opened 22 August 2015

== Notable alumni ==
- Alana Patience
- Salme Geransar
- Reshad Strik
