= Hideo Nakata =

Japanese filmmaker (born 1961)

- 中田 秀夫
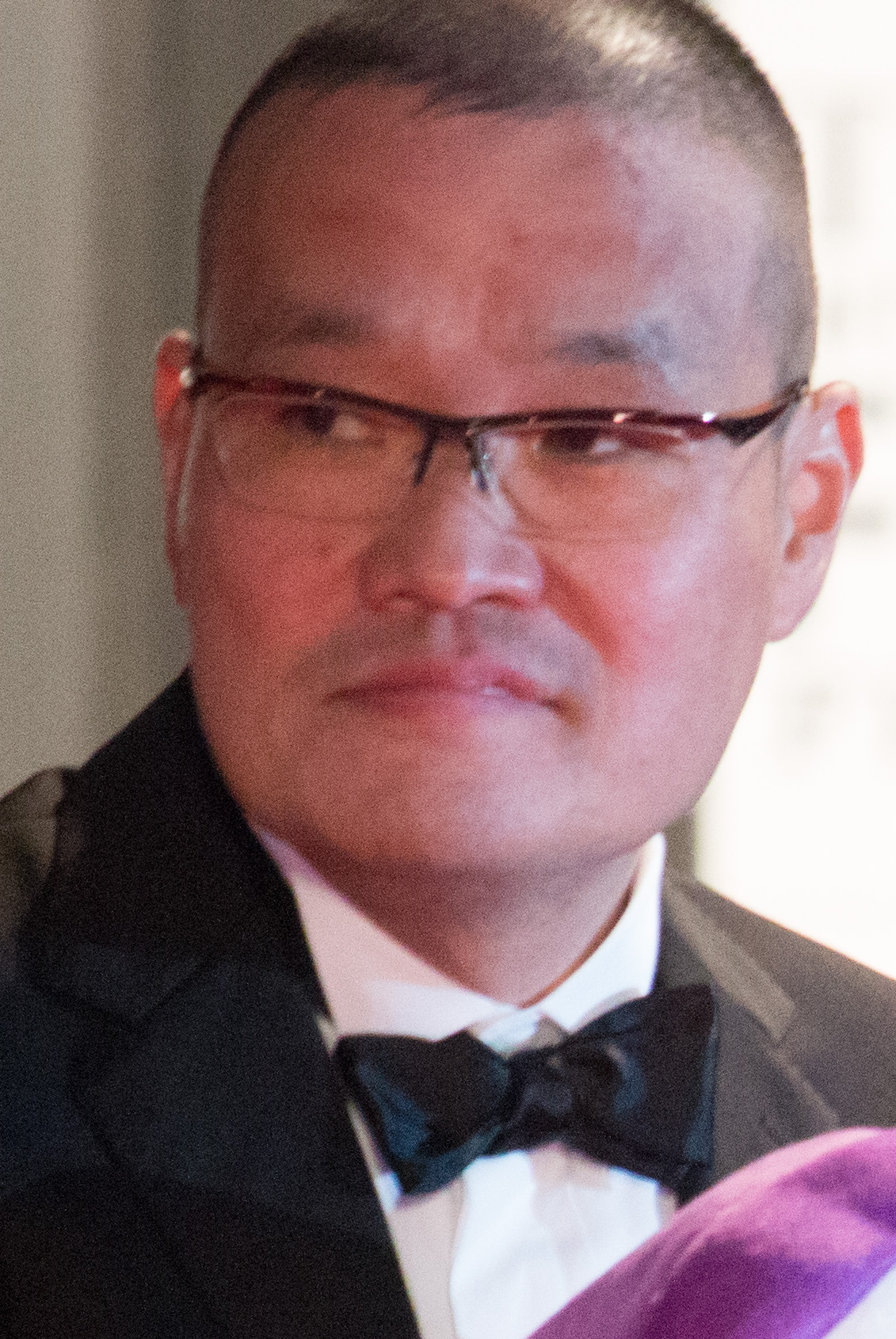
- Nakata at the 28th Tokyo International Film Festival in 2015
- Born: 19 July 1961 (age 65); Okayama, Japan
- Other name: Nakada Hideo
- Occupation: Filmmaker

Hideo Nakata (中田 秀夫, Nakata Hideo; born July 19, 1961) is a Japanese filmmaker, most famous for his 1998 film Ring.

== Life and career ==
Nakata was born in Okayama, Japan. He is most familiar to Western audiences for his work on Japanese horror films such as Ring (1998), Ring 2 (1999) and Dark Water (2002). Several of these were remade in English as The Ring (2002), Dark Water (2005), and The Ring Two.

Nakata was scheduled to make his English-language debut with True Believers, but later pulled out. He was later offered by DreamWorks to direct the movie The Ring Two (2005), which he accepted, making his English-language debut with a sequel to a remake of his own film.

Nakata made his initial breakthrough into film with Ghost Actress a.k.a. Don't Look Up (1996). Although failing to attain any large-scale success, the film was responsible for leading to his directing of Ring.

Other Nakata films include Sleeping Bride (2000); Curse, Death & Spirit; and Chaos (2000). He directed the psychological thriller The Incite Mill which premiered on 16 October 2010 in Japan. He has now completed a Japanese ghost story, Kaidan. Nakata is currently working on Hearn, which is about the life of Lafcadio Hearn who wrote Kwaidan.

He is represented by United Talent Agency. His film Chatroom, was screened in the Un Certain Regard section at the 2010 Cannes Film Festival.

== Filmography ==
=== Film ===
- Curse, Death & Spirit (1992)
- Don't Look Up (1996) – also writer (story)
- Ring (1998)
- Joseph Losey: The Man with Four Names (1998)
- Ring 2 (1999)
- Sleeping Bride (1999)
- Take It (2000)
- Chaos (2000)
- Dark Water (2002)
- The Ring Two (2005)
- Kaidan (2007)
- L: Change the World (2008)
- Foreign Filmmakers' Guide to Hollywood (2009)
- Chatroom (2010)
- The Incite Mill (2010)
- The Complex (2013)
- Life After 3.11 (2013)
- Monsterz (2014)
- Words With Gods (2014) – segment "Sufferings"
- Ghost Theater (2015)
- Somewhere in Kakamura (2016 short)
- White Lily (2016)
- Life in Overtime (2018)
- Stolen Identity (2018)
- The Woman Who Keeps a Murderer (2019)
- Sadako (2019)
- Stigmatized Properties (2020)
- Stolen Identity 2 (2020)
- Usogui: Lie Eater (2022)
- It's in the Woods (2022)
- The Forbidden Play (2023)
- Stolen Identity: Final Hacking Game (2024)
- Fushigi Dagashiya Zenitendō (2024)
- Stigmatized Properties: Possession (2025)

=== Television ===
- Gakkô no kaidan F (1997) (story "Hoken-shitsu", story "Rei Video")
- Shinigami-kun (2014) – 1 episode
- Yo ni mo Kimyô na Monogatari: Eiga kantoku-hen (2015)
- Magamoto (2016) – 8-part miniseries
- Remote de Korosareru (2020)
- Kyoufu Shinbun (2020)
- The Days (2023) – with Masaki Nishiura

== See also ==
- Japanese horror
