= Aleksa Palladino =

American actress

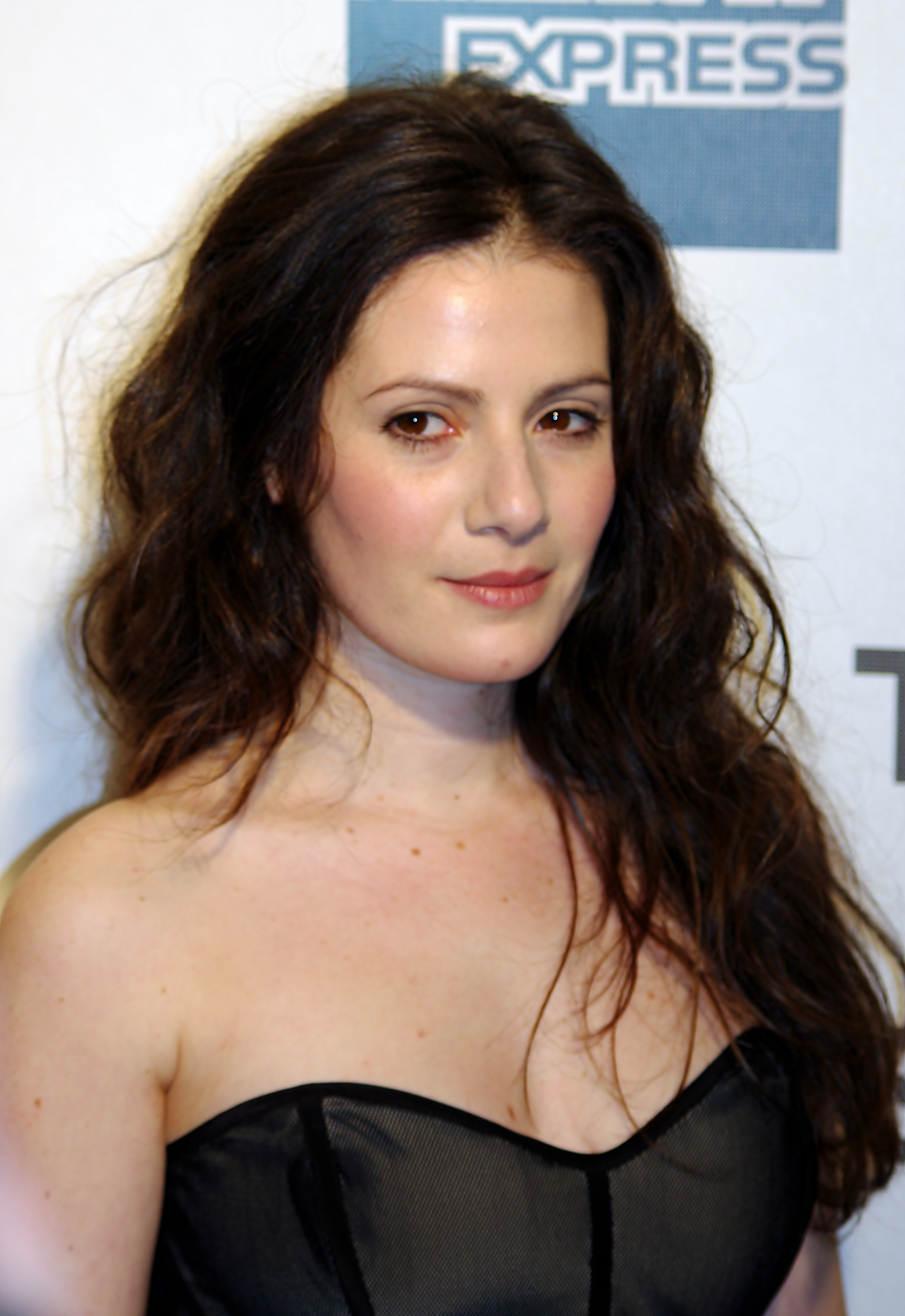
- Palladino in 2011
- Born: 1980 or 1981 (age 45–46); New York City, U.S.
- Occupations: Actress; singer
- Years active: 1996–present
- Spouse: Devon Church (m. 2004; div. 2015)

Aleksa Palladino (born 1980 or 1981) is an American actress. She had lead roles in Manny & Lo, The Adventures of Sebastian Cole, Find Me Guilty, Angela Darmody in the HBO crime series Boardwalk Empire (2010–2011), Mara in Wrong Turn 2: Dead End (2007), Before the Devil Knows You're Dead (2007), The Midnight Swim (2014), Mary Sheeran in The Irishman (2019), and No Man of God (2021). She also played a main role in the second season of the AMC period drama Halt and Catch Fire. From 2007 to 2018, she was one half of the dreampop duo Exitmusic with former husband Devon Church, releasing the albums The Decline of the West (2007), Passage (2012), and The Recognitions (2018).

== Early life ==
Palladino was born in New York City, where she grew up and worked as an actress. She is the only child of filmmaker, soprano singer, photographer, graphic artist, and producer Sabrina A. Palladino, and the granddaughter of Sicilian painter and sculptor Angela Fodale Palladino and the Italian-American illustrator and graphic designer Anthony Americo "Tony" Palladino, who designed the lettering for Robert Bloch's 1959 novel Psycho. An episode of The Marvelous Mrs. Maisel, created by Amy Sherman-Palladino, is dedicated to Tony. Palladino's aunt, Kate Palladino-Kirk, is a designer, her great-great-uncle Rocco Fodale was a painter from Trapani, and her great-uncle Tonino Fodale worked as a retoucher for the biggest fashion photographers, such as Richard Avedon and Peter Lindbergh. Palladino's ancestral origins are in Naples and Sicily.

== Career ==
=== Acting ===
Her debut role was as "Lo" in Manny & Lo opposite Scarlett Johansson and Mary Kay Place, in which she played a 16-year-old character despite being 14 at the time. The next year, she was given her first lead role in the short film Number One Fan with Glenn Fitzgerald, and soon appeared in Wrestling with Alligators with Joely Richardson, the well-received The Adventures of Sebastian Cole with Adrian Grenier, and Second Skin with Fitzgerald again.

The year 2000 saw the release of Red Dirt, followed by the independent film Lonesome, and Storytelling with Selma Blair. She then had guest appearances in Law & Order: Criminal Intent (where she played two different characters), The Sopranos, and Law & Order.

In 2004, Palladino returned to acting with a guest appearance on Medium, followed by her lead role in Spectropia and a supporting one in Find Me Guilty with Vin Diesel. After she worked in Find Me Guilty, director Sidney Lumet offered Palladino the role of Chris Lasorda in Before the Devil Knows You're Dead. She then appeared in The Picture of Dorian Gray, based on the novel by Oscar Wilde, and landed a supporting role in the acclaimed horror sequel Wrong Turn 2: Dead End.

The 2010s saw her busy mainly on television; her role as Prohibition-era gangster Jimmy Darmody's closeted wife Angela in the HBO series Boardwalk Empire stands out. She was also a series regular of season two in the critically acclaimed AMC series Halt and Catch Fire as Sara Wheeler. Her next important film role was Mary Sheeran in Martin Scorsese's The Irishman, which was distributed by Netflix and received only a limited theatrical release.

=== Music ===
Palladino was the lead singer and songwriter of the band Exitmusic. After self-releasing their debut album in 2007, the band released an EP and a follow-up album on indie label Secretly Canadian in 2011 and 2012, respectively. Palladino released a final Exitmusic album on Felte Records in 2018.

== Personal life ==
Palladino formed the band Exitmusic with her husband Devon Church, whom she had met on a cross-Canada train trip in 2001. Palladino and Church divorced in 2015.

== Discography ==
with Duo Exitmusic

- The Decline of the West (self-released, 2007)
- From Silence (EP) (Secretly Canadian, 2011)
- Passage (Secretly Canadian, 2012)
- The Recognitions (Felte, 2018)

== Filmography ==
=== Film ===
Year	Title	Role	Notes
1996	Manny & Lo	Laurel	
1997	Number One Fan	Sadie	
1998	Wrestling with Alligators	Maddy Hawkins	
1998	A Cool, Dry Place	Bonnie	
1998	The Adventures of Sebastian Cole	Mary	
1998	Second Skin	Gwen	Short film
1999	Cherry	Darcy	
2000	Red Dirt	Emily Whaley	
2001	Lonesome	Lily Randolph	
2001	Ball in the House	Lizzie	
2001	Storytelling	Catherine	Segment: "Fiction"
2003	Mona Lisa Smile	Frances	
2006	Find Me Guilty	Marina DiNorscio	
2006	Spectropia	Spectropia	
2007	The Picture of Dorian Gray	Sibyl Vane	
2007	Wrong Turn 2: Dead End	Mara Stone	
2007	Before the Devil Knows You're Dead	Chris	
2009	Acts of Mercy	Maggie Collins	
2014	The Midnight Swim	Isa	
2014	Rose	Rose	Short film
2016	The Veil	Karen Sweetzer	
2016	Holidays	Persian	
2019	The Irishman	Mary Sheeran	
2019	The Mandela Effect	Claire	
2021	No Man of God	Carolyn Lieberman	

=== Television ===
Year	Title	Role	Notes
2000	The Huntress	Brandi Thorson	Episode: "Pilot"
2002	Law & Order: Criminal Intent	Lilly Carlyle	Episode: "The Insider"
2002, 2004	The Sopranos	Alessandra Alex	Episode: "Eloise" Episode: "Unidentified Black Males"
2003	Law & Order	Teresa Drosi	Episode: "Blaze"
2005	Medium	Lyla Gallagher / Geraldine Hanscombe	Episode: "Sweet Dreams"
2006	Without a Trace	Katie Duncan	Episode: "All the Sinners, Saints"
2009	Law & Order: Criminal Intent	Angela	Episode: "All In"
2010–11	Boardwalk Empire	Angela Darmody	Main role (seasons 1–2); 24 episodes
2014	Elementary	Iris Lanzer	Episode: "Corpse De Ballet"
2014–15	Rogue	Sarah	Recurring role (season 1); guest role (season 2); 6 episodes
2015	Halt and Catch Fire	Sara Wheeler	Main role (season 2); 10 episodes
2018	Unsolved	Megan Poole	Recurring role; 3 episodes
2018	One Dollar	Chelsea Wyler	Recurring role; 4 episodes
2019	The Loudest Voice	Judy Laterza	Miniseries; 7 episodes
2024	The Penguin	Carla Viti	2 episodes
