= Advances in Adaptive Data Analysis =

- Discipline: interdisciplinary
- Language: English
- Edited by: N. E. Huang, T. Y. Hou

Publication details
- History: 2009–present
- Publisher: World Scientific (Singapore)
- Frequency: Quarterly

Standard abbreviations
- ISO 4: Adv. Adapt. Data Anal.

Indexing
- ISSN: 1793-5369 (print); 1793-7175 (web)

Links
- Journal homepage

Advances in Adaptive Data Analysis (AADA) is an interdisciplinary scientific journal published by World Scientific. It reports on developments in data analysis methodology and their practical applications, with a special emphasis on adaptive approaches.

The journal seeks to transform data analysis into a competent tool for scientific research and engineering applications, and to distinguish it from mere data processing. Unlike data processing, which relies on established procedures and parameters, data analysis encompasses in-depth study in order to extract physical understanding. A further distinction the journal makes is the need to modify data analysis methodology (thus, "adaptive") to accommodate the complexity of scientific phenomena.

The journal mainly features original research, but occasionally publishes surveys, reviews, and proceedings for special conferences. It is indexed by Inspec.
