= Charlie Hofheimer =

American actor

- Born: Charles Nathan Hofheimer; April 17, 1981 (age 44); Detroit, Michigan, United States
- Occupation: Actor
- Years active: 1994–2019, 2024–present
- Spouse: Shannon Lucio
- Children: 1

Charles Nathan Hofheimer (born April 17, 1981) is an American actor. Beginning his career as a child actor, Hofheimer made his film debut in Lassie (1994), subsequently appearing in Boys (1996) and Fathers' Day (1997). Transitioning into adult roles, Hofheimer had supporting roles in films such as Music of the Heart (1999), Black Hawk Down (2001), The Village (2004), Would You Rather (2012), Paranoia (2013), and Easy Living (2017).

He is best known for his supporting roles as Abe Drexler on the fourth, fifth, and sixth seasons of the AMC period drama series Mad Men (2010–13), Ben Grimes on the Fox political espionage thriller series 24: Legacy (2017), and Wallace White on the Apple TV+ period mystery thriller miniseries Lady in the Lake (2024).

== Life and career ==
Hofheimer was born in Detroit, Michigan and moved to Brooklyn, New York when he was a year old. He began acting at a young age. His first film role was in the 1994 version of Lassie. He has appeared in other feature films such as Boys, Fathers' Day, Music of the Heart, Black Hawk Down and The Village. In 2008 Hofheimer produced, directed, wrote and edited a short film, Baggage.

Hofheimer's television credits include Are You Afraid of the Dark?, Law & Order, CSI: Crime Scene Investigation, NCIS, Numb3rs, Medium, House M.D., and Mad Men.

Hofheimer has also starred in several theatre productions. In 1996 he played Kenny Simmonds in Minor Demons at the Currican Theatre in New York City, and then again in 1997 at the Century Theatre in New York City. In 2000 he played Ovid Bernstein and Tobias Pfeiffer II in Old Money at the Mitzi E. Newhouse Theater in New York City. His other stage performances include Spittin' Image (as Matt) at the Forum Theatre, Ruler of my Destiny (as Hart) at the Long Wharf Theatre in New Haven, Connecticut, Opelika (as Matty) at the Third Eye Repertory Company in New York City, Treasure Island (as Jim Hawkins) at the Blue Light Theatre Company in New York City and he made his Broadway debut as Jimmy in On the Waterfront.

In 1999, he graduated from New York Lab School, a small public school in New York City.

== Filmography ==
Film
Year	Title	Role	Notes
1994	Lassie	Jim Garland	
1996	Boys	John Cooke	
1997	Fathers' Day	Scott Andrews	
1998	Edge City	James	
1999	Music of the Heart	Nick at 17	
2001	Last Ball	Jim	
2001	Black Hawk Down	Corporal Jamie Smith	
2002	The Ghost of F. Scott Fitzgerald	James Powell	
2004	The Village	Kevin	
2008	Baggage		Short film; Also producer, director, writer, and editor
2009	Blur	Raymond	
2009	Against the Current		Also associate producer
2010	Numb	Jason	
2010	Autopilot	Mike	
2012	Would You Rather	Travis	
2013	Paranoia	Richard McAllister	
2016	Dependent's Day	Larry Wright	
2017	Easy Living	Norman	
2019	The Mandela Effect	Brendan	
2019	The Nearest Human Being	Devin	

Television
Year	Title	Role	Notes
1995	New York News		Episode: "A Question of Truth"
1996	Are You Afraid of the Dark?	Jeff / Dean	2 episodes
1996	Law & Order	Andrew Jansson / Ben Karmel	2 episodes
1999	Trinity		Episode: "Breaking In, Breaking Out, Breaking Up, Breaking Down"
1999	Now and Again	Nick	Episode: "A Girl's Life"
2003	CSI: Crime Scene Investigation	Kevin McCallum	Episode: "A Night at the Movies"
2003	Law & Order: Special Victims Unit	Jerry Dupree	Episode: "Tortured"
2003	NCIS	Petty Officer First Class Bobby Wilkes	Episode: "High Seas"
2006	Numb3rs	Ron Allen	Episode: "The Running Man"
2007	Medium	David Channing	Episode: "Second Opinion"
2007	House M.D.	Mark Allmore	Episode: "97 Seconds"
2008	Eli Stone	Scott Miller	Episode: "I Want Your Sex"
2008	Canterbury's Law	Ethan Foster	3 episodes
2008	Fear Itself	Scott	Episode: "Community"
2009	Cold Case	George Sweeney	Episode: "Lotto Fever"
2009	Without a Trace	Chris White	Episode: "Voir Dire"
2010–2013	Mad Men	Abe Drexler	11 episodes
2011	Rizzoli & Isles	Lieutenant Dan Forman	Episode: "We Don't Need Another Hero"
2012	Private Practice	Ron Nelson	4 episodes
2012	The Good Wife	Officer Zimmerman	Episode: "Blue Ribbon Panel"
2014	Grey's Anatomy	Jason Castor	Episode: "Do You Know?"
2015	Castle	Eric Chambers	Episode: "At Close Range"
2015	Perception	Roger Pierce	Episode: "Brainstorm"
2015	Turn: Washington's Spies	Lieutenant Chaffee	3 episodes
2017	24: Legacy	Ben Grimes	7 episodes
2018	Escape at Dannemora	Kenny Barrile Sr.	Miniseries
2019	The Man in the High Castle	Daniel Levine	Episode: "Mauvaise Foi"
2019	For All Mankind	Dennis Lambert	2 episodes
2024	Lady in the Lake	Wallace White	Miniseries
