= Scott Derrickson =

American filmmaker (born 1966)

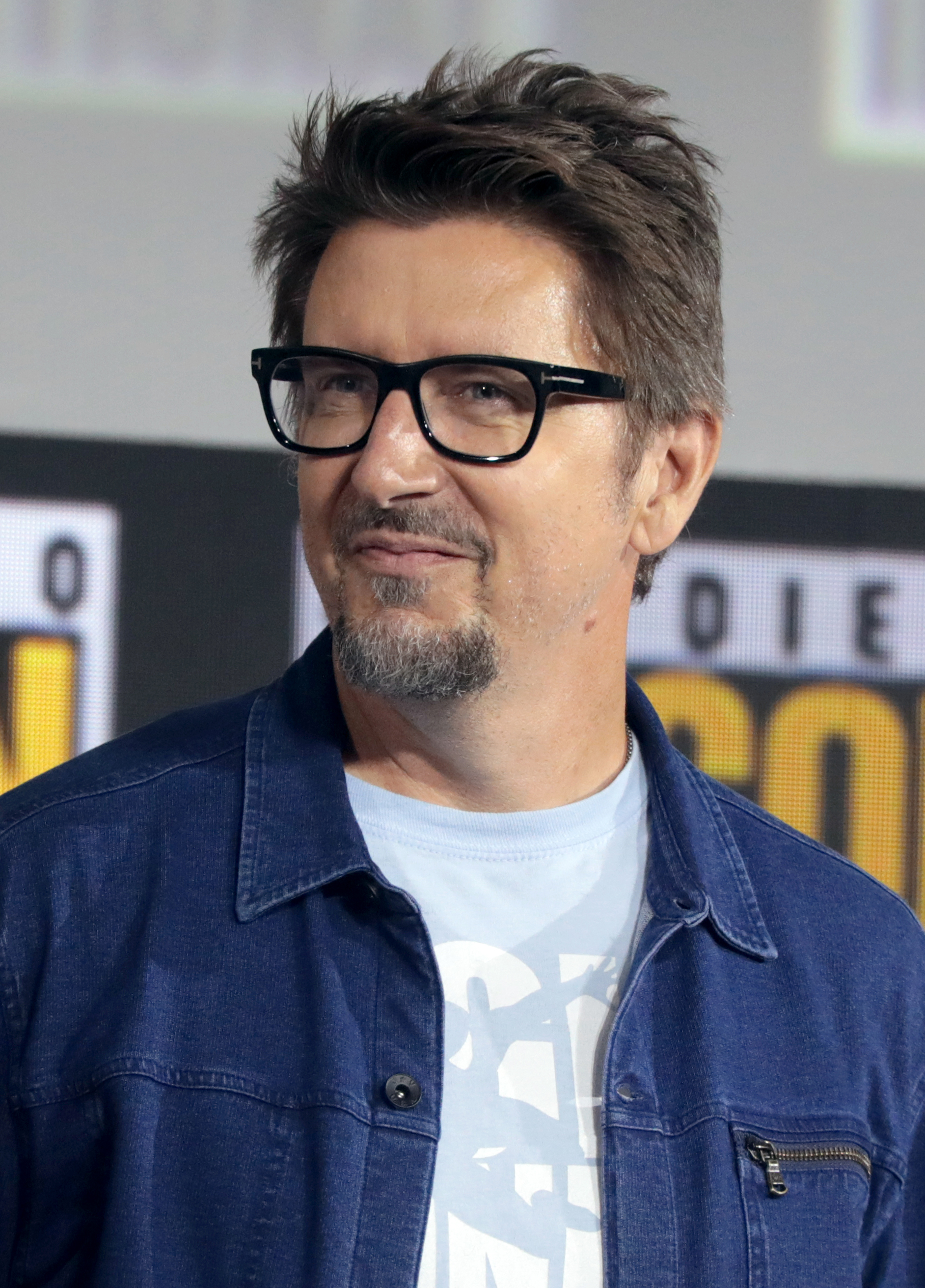
- Derrickson at the 2019 San Diego Comic-Con
- Born: July 16, 1966 (age 60); Denver, Colorado, U.S.
- Education: Biola University (BA); University of Southern California (MFA)
- Occupations: Film director; film producer; screenwriter
- Years active: 1995–present
- Spouses: Joyce Ericsson (m. 1993; div. 2019); Maggie Levin (m. 2022)
- Children: 2

Scott Derrickson (born July 16, 1966) is an American filmmaker. He is known for his work in the horror genre, directing films such as The Exorcism of Emily Rose (2005), Sinister (2012), The Black Phone (2022), and its sequel, Black Phone 2 (2025). He is also known for the superhero film Doctor Strange (2016), based on the Marvel Comics character.

== Early life ==
Scott Derrickson grew up in Denver, Colorado. He graduated from Biola University with a BA in Humanities with an emphasis in philosophy and literature and a B.A. in communications with an emphasis in film and a minor in theology. He completed his graduate studies at USC School of Cinema-Television.

== Career ==
Derrickson's debut feature was Hellraiser: Inferno, the fifth installment in the long-running Hellraiser film series. It was released straight to video in 2000. Following this, Derrickson and co-writer Paul Harris Boardman spent several years doing script-doctoring work for studios. "I was paid to write or rewrite 13 screenplays," Derrickson said, "None of them got made. I was earning a good living but all of my creativity would be read by just a handful of executives. It caused a kind of soul sickness in me." Some of Derrickson and Boardman's unproduced scripts include Future Tense, The Mystic, Ghosting and Mindbender.

Derrickson co-wrote and directed The Exorcism of Emily Rose, which was loosely based on a true story about Anneliese Michel. The film was named in the Chicago Film Critics Association's list of the "Top 100 Scariest Films Ever Made," and was ranked 9th on the list for “The Scariest Movie of All Time According to Science” by the Science of Scare project. Theatrical box office gross for The Exorcism of Emily Rose was over $144 million worldwide. It received the award for Best Horror Film at the 32nd Saturn Awards.

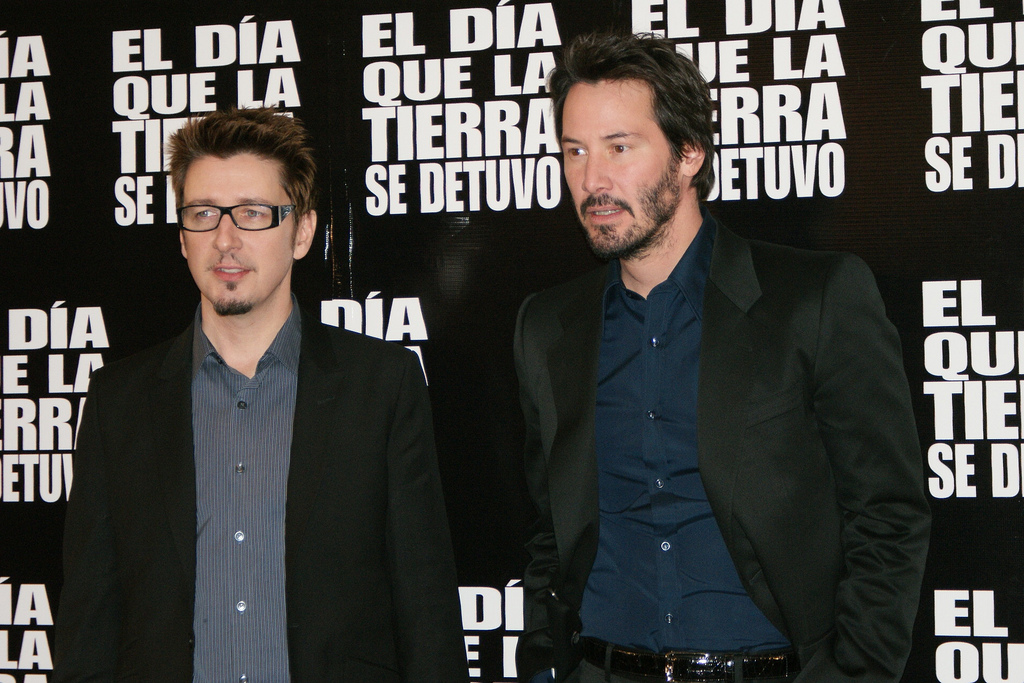
Derrickson with star Keanu Reeves on 12 December 2008 in Mexico City

Derrickson next directed a remake of The Day the Earth Stood Still, starring Keanu Reeves and Jennifer Connelly, written by David Scarpa. The film was released in late 2008 and earned over $233 million worldwide.

In August 2011, Derrickson teamed up with producer Jason Blum to write and direct Sinister, a mystery-horror film starring Ethan Hawke. The $3 million picture was released in theaters by Summit Entertainment on October 12, 2012, and received generally positive critical reviews. Sinister earned over $48 million at the U.S. box office and over $78 million worldwide. Derrickson co-wrote but did not direct the film's sequel. Sinister has repeatedly been named “The Scariest Movie of All Time According to Science” by the Science of Scare project, which measures the heart rates and heart rate variances of audience members as they watch 50 of the scariest horror films ever made.

Deliver Us from Evil (2014) was produced by Jerry Bruckheimer, and is based on a 2001 non-fiction book entitled Beware the Night by former police Sergeant Ralph Sarchie and Lisa Collier Cool; its marketing campaign highlighted that it was "inspired by actual accounts". It was released on July 2, 2014, and grossed $87.9 million against a $30 million budget.

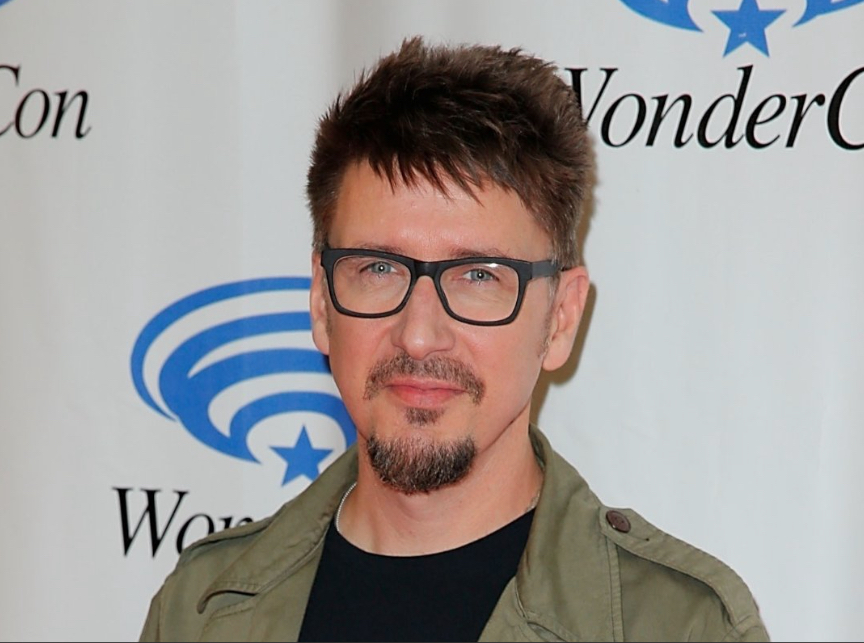
Derrickson on 19 April, 2014 at WonderCon

Derrickson next directed the film Doctor Strange, based on the Marvel Comics property and part of the Marvel Cinematic Universe. It was released in November 2016. The film was a commercial and critical success. It received the award for Best Comic-To-Film Motion Picture at the 43rd Saturn Awards, and received an Academy Award nomination for Best Visual Effects.

In December 2018, it was announced that Derrickson would direct the Doctor Strange sequel entitled Doctor Strange in the Multiverse of Madness which was planned for a May 2021 release. In January 2020, Derrickson announced that he had stepped away from directing duties as a result of unspecified creative differences, after which Sam Raimi took over. Derrickson remained involved with the film as an executive producer. Derrickson's departure from the film allowed him to put more focus on The Black Phone.

In 2021, Derrickson directed an adaptation of Joe Hill's short story The Black Phone, from a script he co-wrote with C. Robert Cargill. Produced by Blumhouse Productions and Universal Pictures, The Black Phone re-teamed Derrickson with Ethan Hawke and James Ransone, and was theatrically released to positive reviews on June 24, 2022. The film was very personal to Derrickson, as he said it had grown out of three years of therapy and that it was a way for him to explore "the traumatic nature of [his] own childhood". It received the awards for Best Horror Film and Best Adapted Screenplay at the 47th Saturn Awards, Best Wide Release Movie and Best Screenplay at the 2023 Fangoria Chainsaw Awards, and the Bram Stoker Award for Superior Achievement in a Screenplay.

In 2023, Derrickson co-wrote and directed the segment Dreamkill for the horror anthology film V/H/S/85. The film won the Fangoria Chainsaw Award for Best Streaming Premiere.

In June 2024, Derrickson completed his next film, The Gorge, for Skydance Media. Apple TV+ acquired the rights for the film. It stars Anya Taylor-Joy, Miles Teller and Sigourney Weaver. The Gorge received two Emmy Awards nominations: Outstanding Television Movie and Outstanding Sound Editing for a Limited or Anthology Series, Movie or Special. It also received a Critics Choice Awards nomination for Best Movie Made for Television, and a Directors Guild of America Awards nomination for Best Achievement in Movies for Television. The Gorge became Apple TV+'s most-watched film premiere and boosted global viewership by 80% over its debut weekend in February 2025. It was the most watched movie on Apple TV+ in 2025.

Derrickson next directed Black Phone 2 from his own co-written script. Released on October 27th, 2025, the film received generally positive reviews according to aggregators Rotten Tomatoes and Metacritic, and grossed over 130 million dollars against a 30 million dollar budget.

In 2026, Derrickson and C. Robert Cargill created and co-wrote the podcast Midnight Radio starring Ethan Hawke.

In October 2026, Derrickson, C. Robert Cargill and Vince Cheng were announced to be producing the film adaptation of the game Mouthwashing, to be released under the Crooked Highway banner.

== Filmography ==
=== Short film ===
Year	Title	Director	Writer	Producer	Notes
1995	Love in the Ruins	Yes	Yes	Yes	Also editor
2021	Shadowprowler	Yes	Yes	Executive	
2023	Dreamkill	Yes	Yes	No	Segment of V/H/S/85

=== Feature film ===
Year	Title	Director	Writer	Producer	Notes
2000	Urban Legends: Final Cut	No	Yes	No	
2000	Hellraiser: Inferno	Yes	Yes	No	Direct-to-video
2004	Land of Plenty	No	Story	No	
2005	The Exorcism of Emily Rose	Yes	Yes	No	
2008	The Day the Earth Stood Still	Yes	No	No	
2012	Sinister	Yes	Yes	Executive	
2013	Devil's Knot	No	Yes	Executive	
2014	Deliver Us from Evil	Yes	Yes	No	
2015	Sinister 2	No	Yes	Yes	
2016	Doctor Strange	Yes	Yes	No	
2022	The Black Phone	Yes	Yes	Yes	
2025	The Gorge	Yes	No	Yes	
2025	Black Phone 2	Yes	Yes	Yes	

Uncredited script revisions

- Dracula 2000 (2000)
- The Messengers (2007)
- Scream 4 (2011)
- Poltergeist (2015)

Executive producer only

- Misunderstood (2014)
- Kristy (2014)
- No Man of God (2021)
- Doctor Strange in the Multiverse of Madness (2022)

Co-producer

- The Visitation (2006)

=== Television ===
Year	Title	Director	Executive producer	Notes
2020	Into the Dark	No	Yes	Episode "My Valentine"
2020	Snowpiercer	Uncredited	Yes	Unused TV pilot Shot in 2017

== Accolades ==
Award	Year	Category	Nominated work	Result	Ref.
Astra TV Awards	2025	Best Directing in a Limited Series or TV Movie	The Gorge	Nominated	
Bram Stoker Award	2022	Screenplay	The Black Phone	Won (Note: Shared with C. Robert Cargill) (Note: Tie with The Duffer Brothers for Stranger Things (Season 4, Episode 1: "Chapter One: The Hellfire Club"))	
Directors Guild of America Awards	2026	Outstanding Directorial Achievement in Movies for Television	The Gorge	Nominated	
Fangoria Chainsaw Awards	2023	Best Screenplay	The Black Phone	Won	
Primetime Creative Arts Emmy Awards	2025	Outstanding Television Movie	The Gorge	Nominated	
Saturn Awards	2017	Best Director	Doctor Strange	Nominated	
Saturn Awards	2017	Best Film Screenplay	Doctor Strange	Nominated (Note: Shared with Jon Spaihts and C. Robert Cargill)	
Saturn Awards	2022	Best Writing	The Black Phone	Nominated	
Sitges Film Festival	2012	Best Motion Picture	Sinister	Nominated	

== See also ==
- Scott Derrickson's unrealized projects
