= Scott Derrickson's unrealized projects =

During his long career, American film director Scott Derrickson has worked on several projects which never progressed beyond the pre-production stage under his direction. Some of these projects fell in development hell, were officially canceled, were in development limbo or would see life under a different production team.

== 1990s ==
=== The Church ===
In 1996, a screenplay entitled The Church was in development at Trimark Pictures with Derrickson signed on for what would have been his feature directorial debut. Since this was not produced, Hellraiser: Inferno would become his first film instead.

=== Darkness Falling ===
In 1999, Derrickson and Paul Harris Boardman's screenplay Darkness Falling was planned to be made with Bryan Singer attached to produce and Columbia Pictures distributing.

== 2000s ==
=== Urban Legends: Bloody Mary ===
After writing the script for the horror sequel Urban Legends: Final Cut, Derrickson had an opportunity to write and direct the next installment in the series. However, the offer was revoked after Derrickson's first film Hellraiser: Inferno went straight to video and was poorly received. The film, Urban Legends: Bloody Mary, was released in 2005 and instead directed by Mary Lambert.

=== Future Tense ===
In 2001, Variety reported that Derrickson and Paul Harris Boardman were to write the sci-fi action film Future Tense, based a story by Wagner James Au set 200 years in the future during World War III. Sean O'Keefe and Dave Cohen were to produce through Artist Production Group with Studiocanal set to distribute.

=== The Mystic ===
Another early script by Derrickson and Paul Harris Boardman, The Mystic, was reported by Variety to be in development at Disney after being stuck in pre-production turnaround at Dimension Films.

=== Ghosting ===
Variety also reported that Derrickson and Paul Harris Boardman were to write a film titled Ghosting as a part of their three-picture deal at Dimension Films, with Derrickson to direct and Boardman to produce.

=== Mindbender ===
Another unseen project announced by Variety was a film called Mindbender, which Derrickson was also attached to direct.

=== Paradise Lost ===
In 2006, it was announced that Derrickson was to direct a live-action film version of John Milton's epic poem Paradise Lost for Legendary Entertainment. Milton's 17th century poem, which follows Lucifer's failed rebellion in heaven and subsequent role in Adam and Eve's fall from grace, was adapted by Philip de Blasi and Byron Willinger. "The screenplay takes aspects of the entire arc," Derrickson explained, "What it encompasses is still a fraction of the poem and has to be, because you could make a 50-hour miniseries out of it if you wanted to. But it really covers, end-to-end, the basic events of the poem." In 2010, Alex Proyas was attached to direct Paradise Lost instead of Derrickson, which led to Derrickson sharing concept art done for his version of the film in 2016.

=== Kingdom Come ===
In 2006, Derrickson was attached to direct his script Kingdom Come for Sony Entertainment.

=== Nine Chambers ===
In 2007, Derrickson was attached to direct his script Nine Chambers for Universal Pictures.

=== The Birds remake ===
In 2007, it was reported that Derrickson would co-write with Paul Harris Boardman and direct a remake of Alfred Hitchcock's The Birds for Universal Pictures with Michael Bay producing, and Naomi Watts starring as Melanie Daniels. In 2013, Derrickson stated that he had been asked to do a rewrite on the project on "what feels like 10 years ago", and that it was likely not going forward in the future.

=== The Miso Soup ===
In 2008, it was announced that German director Wim Wenders would direct an adaptation of In the Miso Soup, scripted by Derrickson and Philippe Carcassonne, and eying to shoot in spring 2011. Derrickson had previously conceived the story for Wenders' 2004 film Land of Plenty.

=== Hyperion Cantos ===
In January 2009, Derrickson was set to direct Hyperion Cantos for Warner Bros. and Graham King, with Trevor Sands penning the script, planning to adapt the novels Hyperion and The Fall of Hyperion into one film.

=== The Substitute remake ===
On October 1, 2009, it was reported that Derrickson was going to direct an American remake of the Danish sci-fi film The Substitute for Sam Raimi's production company, Ghost House Pictures. Derrickson co-wrote the film's script with frequent writing partner Paul Harris Boardman.

=== The Living ===
On October 18, 2009, Derrickson was tapped by Lakeshore Entertainment to direct the suspense thriller The Living, based on a story he pitched along with Paul Harris Boardman. The film's plot was not revealed.

== 2010s ==
=== Hercules: The Thracian Wars ===
In 2010, Derrickson was attached to direct Hercules: The Thracian Wars, which became 2014's Hercules, directed by Brett Ratner.

=== Goliath ===
In January 2011, Derrickson was in talks with Relativity Media to helm Goliath, a retelling of the Biblical tale of David and Goliath on a "heightened 300 level". The script, penned by the screenwriting team J. D. Payne and Patrick McKay, was reported to have been made into a "period action movie made with contemporary sensibilities." In August that year, Dwayne Johnson was in talks to portray Goliath and Relativity offered the role of David to Taylor Lautner.

=== Two Eyes Staring remake ===
In October 2011, Derrickson was reported to direct Charlize Theron in a remake of the Dutch horror thriller Two Eyes Staring, from a script he wrote with Paul Harris Boardman.

=== Thunderstruck TV pilot ===
In November 2011, AMC picked up a TV pilot written by Derrickson and Paul Harris Boardman titled Thunderstruck, about an alien spacecraft that appears in a small Montana town. Derrickson was reported to be directing the series' pilot episode.

=== When Gravity Fails ===
In September 2012, a film adaptation of George Alec Effinger's 1986 novel When Gravity Fails was in development with Derrickson attached to direct and Brian Klugman and Lee Sternthal writing and producing for IM Global. In 2013, writer C. Robert Cargill on board to write the script. In a 2016 interview, Cargill announced on Double Toasted that the project was probably in turnaround.

=== The Breathing Method ===
A film adaptation of the Stephen King novella The Breathing Method was announced as being in development at Blumhouse in October 2012, with Derrickson directing, from a screenplay by Scott Teems. In December 2019, the project was again announced, with the film being marked as his "return to horror" after he finished his work on Doctor Strange in the Multiverse of Madness. Derrickson was reported to give the adaptation another shot after the release of his film The Black Phone.

=== Deus Ex ===
In November 2012, CBS Films had hired Derrickson and C. Robert Cargill to write an adaptation of the acclaimed video game Deus Ex, with Derrickson on board to direct. The film reportedly would have borrowed heavily from the more origin-oriented Deus Ex: Human Revolution. In a 2014 interview, Derrickson stated that his involvement with Doctor Strange is what had halted further development on the film. Fragments of the film's script were later shared by USA Today in 2022.

=== The Outer Limits film ===
In June 2014, Derrickson was reported to reunite with C. Robert Cargill once again to write a big screen take on the 1960s sci-fi TV series The Outer Limits for MGM. The duo were allegedly going to adapt the season 2 episode "Demon with a Glass Hand" into a feature film script.

=== Jonny Quest ===
In 2016, Forbes reported that Warner Bros. Pictures' planned live action film adaption of Jonny Quest would be directed by either Derrickson, Joe Cornish or Justin Lin, working from a script by Robert Rodriguez and Terry Rossio. The project was intended to spawn a franchise of additional films and spinoffs.

=== Doctor Strange in the Multiverse of Madness ===
After the success of Doctor Strange, in December 2018, Derrickson committed to directing the second installment, Doctor Strange in the Multiverse of Madness, with Benedict Cumberbatch, Benedict Wong, and Rachel McAdams reprising their respective roles of Dr. Stephen Strange, Wong, and Christine Palmer. Marvel was beginning to search for a writer, with The Hollywood Reporter stating that the script would be written throughout 2019 for a planned filming start in early 2020 and a potential release in May 2021. Derrickson wanted the sequel to be the first scary MCU film and explore more of the gothic and horror elements from the comic books than the first installment did. In January 2020, Derrickson stepped away from the project, citing creative differences between himself and Marvel Studios and not wanting to compromise on a film that was different from what he wanted to make.

=== Snowpiercer TV pilot ===
In January 2017, a series adaptation of the 2013 film Snowpiercer was reported to be in development with Derrickson attached to direct the pilot episode, with filming initially scheduled to begin in mid-March. By September 25, Derrickson announced that production for the series had officially commenced. In February 2018, Graeme Manson was tapped to be the new showrunner, later requesting for reshoots as a part of the project's "new vision". In June, Derrickson tweeted that he would be forgoing his option to direct "the extreme reshoots", citing Josh Friedman's original 72-page script as "the best [he's] ever read" and his already-shot feature-length pilot as being some of his best work. Reshoots were later overseen by director James Hawes. None of Derrickson's footage was used.

=== Locke & Key TV pilot ===
In April 2017, Derrickson was slated to direct the pilot for a second attempt at a television-series adaptation of the Locke & Key horror comic series. Later, in July, it was reported that Andy Muschietti was replacing Derrickson as the pilot's director, as Derrickson was forced to drop out of the production due to a scheduling conflict. On March 27, 2018, it was reported that Hulu had passed on the pilot and declined to order it to series.

=== Kill Creek TV series ===
In August 2018, a television adaptation of the horror novel Kill Creek was reported to be in development at Showtime as an hour-long drama. Derrickson was set to direct the series and serve as an executive producer alongside Misha Green, Adam Gomolin, Andrew Lazar and Elisa Ellis.

== 2020s ==
=== Bermuda ===
In March 2020, it was announced that Derrickson had been hired to write and direct Skydance Media's Bermuda Triangle action-adventure, Bermuda, starring Chris Evans, but on September 19, 2023, Marc Webb took over the project.

=== Labyrinth sequel ===
In May 2020, Derrickson was announced as the director of a sequel to Jim Henson's 1986 film Labyrinth. Maggie Levin was reported to collaborate with Derrickson on the film's script. The following year, the film's original star Jennifer Connelly revealed that she "had conversations" about being involved in the Labyrinth sequel but was unsure about what was going to happen. In 2023, Derrickson confirmed that the sequel was not happening due to creative differences with the studio, and in December 2024, Robert Eggers was hired to direct the sequel.

=== The Handover ===
In 2021, Derrickson, Timo Tjahjanto and C. Robert Cargill began writing a Christmas-set script set in the future, revealed to be titled The Handover. Tjahjanto described the project as "ultra violent, ultra absurd, ultra over the top and ultra heartwarming." The feature was never produced.

=== Road of Bones ===
In 2025, it was reported that Derrickson and writer collaborator C. Robert Cargill would develop a screenplay adaptation of Road of Bones, a horror novel by Christopher Golden, for Derrickson to direct via their Crooked Highway production banner.

== As producer ==
=== You Bury Me TV series ===
In February 2018, it was announced that Derrickson would executive produce the television series You Bury Me for Blumhouse Productions. The series was to be a love story set in contemporary war-torn Middle East.

=== Grace TV series ===
In March 2021, Derrickson signed on as executive producer on the Paramount Television Studios series Grace, from writer Joseph Sousa.

=== Room 428 ===
In 2022, Derrickson, C. Robert Cargill and Sherryl Clark signed on to produce a supernatural horror film called Room 428 for Crooked Highway Productions, to be written and directed by the Pierce brothers.
