= 32nd Saturn Awards =

Award ceremony for films and series of 2005

- Date: May 2, 2006
- Site: Los Angeles, California, U.S.

Highlights
- Most awards: Batman Begins; King Kong; Sin City (3)
- Most nominations: Star Wars: Episode III – Revenge of the Sith (10)

The 32nd Saturn Awards, honoring the best in science fiction, fantasy and horror film and television in 2005, were held on May 2, 2006 at the Universal City Hilton Hotel in Los Angeles. The host for the event was Jeffrey Ross.

The following is a complete list of nominees and winners. Winners are highlighted in boldface.

== Winners and nominees ==
=== Film ===
Best Action/Adventure/Thriller Film	Best Fantasy Film
**Sin City**; Flightplan; A History of Violence; Kiss Kiss Bang Bang; Mr. & Mrs. Smith; Oldboy; Red Eye	**Batman Begins**; Charlie and the Chocolate Factory; The Chronicles of Narnia: The Lion, the Witch and the Wardrobe; Harry Potter and the Goblet of Fire; King Kong; Zathura: A Space Adventure
Best Horror Film	Best Sci-Fi Film
**The Exorcism of Emily Rose**; Constantine; Land of the Dead; Saw II; The Skeleton Key; Wolf Creek	**Star Wars: Episode III – Revenge of the Sith**; Fantastic Four; The Island; The Jacket; Serenity; War of the Worlds
Best Animated Film	Best Director
**Corpse Bride**; Chicken Little; Hoodwinked!; Howl's Moving Castle; Madagascar; Wallace & Gromit: The Curse of the Were-Rabbit	**Peter Jackson - King Kong**; Andrew Adamson - The Chronicles of Narnia: The Lion, the Witch and the Wardrobe; George Lucas - Star Wars: Episode III – Revenge of the Sith; Mike Newell - Harry Potter and the Goblet of Fire; Christopher Nolan - Batman Begins; Steven Spielberg - War of the Worlds
Best Screenplay	Best Actor
**Christopher Nolan & David S. Goyer - Batman Begins**; Andrew Adamson, Christopher Markus, Stephen McFeely, & Ann Peacock - The Chronicles of Narnia: The Lion, the Witch and the Wardrobe; Philippa Boyens, Fran Walsh, & Peter Jackson - King Kong; Steve Kloves - Harry Potter and the Goblet of Fire; David Koepp - War of the Worlds; George Lucas - Star Wars: Episode III – Revenge of the Sith	**Christian Bale - Batman Begins as Bruce Wayne/Batman**; Pierce Brosnan - The Matador as Julian Noble; Hayden Christensen - Star Wars: Episode III – Revenge of the Sith as Anakin Skywalker/Darth Vader; Tom Cruise - War of the Worlds as Ray Ferrier; Robert Downey Jr. - Kiss Kiss Bang Bang as Harold "Harry" Lockhart; Viggo Mortensen - A History of Violence as Thomas "Tom" Stall
Best Actress	Best Supporting Actor
**Naomi Watts - King Kong as Ann Darrow**; Jodie Foster - Flightplan as Kyle Pratt; Laura Linney - The Exorcism of Emily Rose as Erin Bruner; Rachel McAdams - Red Eye as Lisa Reisert; Natalie Portman - Star Wars: Episode III – Revenge of the Sith as Padmé Amidala; Tilda Swinton - The Chronicles of Narnia: The Lion, the Witch and the Wardrobe as The White Witch	**Mickey Rourke - Sin City as Marv**; William Hurt - A History of Violence as Richie Cusack; Val Kilmer - Kiss Kiss Bang Bang as Perry van Shrike; Ian McDiarmid - Star Wars: Episode III – Revenge of the Sith as Sheev Palpatine; Cillian Murphy - Red Eye as Jackson Rippner; Liam Neeson - Batman Begins as Ra's al Ghul
Best Supporting Actress	Best Young Actor/Actress
**Summer Glau - Serenity as River Tam**; Jessica Alba - Sin City as Nancy Callahan; Jennifer Carpenter - The Exorcism of Emily Rose as Emily Rose; Katie Holmes - Batman Begins as Rachel Dawes; Michelle Monaghan - Kiss Kiss Bang Bang as Harmony Lane; Gena Rowlands - The Skeleton Key as Violet Deveraux	**Dakota Fanning - War of the Worlds as Rachel Ferrier**; Alex Etel - Millions as Damian Cunningham; Freddie Highmore - Charlie and the Chocolate Factory as Charlie Bucket; Josh Hutcherson - Zathura: A Space Adventure as Walter; William Moseley - The Chronicles of Narnia: The Lion, the Witch and the Wardrobe as Peter Pevensie; Daniel Radcliffe - Harry Potter and the Goblet of Fire as Harry Potter
Best Costume	Best Make-Up
**Isis Mussenden - The Chronicles of Narnia: The Lion, the Witch and the Wardrobe**; Trisha Biggar - Star Wars: Episode III – Revenge of the Sith; Lindy Hemming - Batman Begins; Gabriella Pescucci - Charlie and the Chocolate Factory; Terry Ryan - King Kong; Jany Temime - Harry Potter and the Goblet of Fire	**Howard Berger, Nikki Gooley, Greg Nicotero - The Chronicles of Narnia: The Lion, the Witch and the Wardrobe**; Howard Berger, Greg Nicotero; Land of the Dead; Sin City; Nick Dudman, Amanda Knight - Harry Potter and the Goblet of Fire; Dave Elsey, Lou Elsey, Nikki Gooley - Star Wars: Episode III – Revenge of the Sith; Richard Taylor, Gino Acevedo, Dominie Till, Peter Swords King - King Kong
Best Score	Best Visual Effects
**John Williams**; **Star Wars: Episode III – Revenge of the Sith**; War of the Worlds; Patrick Doyle - Harry Potter and the Goblet of Fire; Danny Elfman - Charlie and the Chocolate Factory; John Ottman - Kiss Kiss Bang Bang; Hans Zimmer & James Newton Howard - Batman Begins	**Joe Letteri, Richard Taylor, Christian Rivers, Brian Van't Hul - King Kong**; John Knoll, Roger Guyett, Rob Coleman, Brian Gernand - Star Wars: Episode III – Revenge of the Sith; Jim Mitchell, Tim Alexander, Tim Webber, John Richardson - Harry Potter and the Goblet of Fire; Dennis Muren, Pablo Helman, Randal M. Dutra, Daniel Sudick - War of the Worlds; Janek Sirrs, Dan Glass, Chris Corbould, Paul J. Franklin - Batman Begins; Dean Wright, Bill Westenhofer, Jim Berney, Scott Farrar - The Chronicles of Narnia: The Lion, the Witch and the Wardrobe

=== Television ===
==== Programs ====
Best Network TV Series	Best Syndicated/Cable Television Series
**Lost (ABC)**; Invasion (ABC); Prison Break (Fox); Smallville (The WB); Supernatural (The WB); Surface (NBC); Veronica Mars (UPN)	**Battlestar Galactica (Sci-Fi)**; The Closer (TNT); The 4400 (USA Network); Nip/Tuck (FX); Stargate Atlantis (Sci-Fi); Stargate SG-1 (Sci-Fi)
Best Television Presentation
**Masters of Horror (Showtime)** (tie); **The Triangle (Sci-Fi)** (tie); Category 7: The End of the World (CBS); Into the West (TNT); Mysterious Island (Hallmark Channel); Revelations (NBC)

==== Acting ====
Best Television Actor	Best Television Actress
**Matthew Fox - Lost (ABC) as Jack Shephard**; Ben Browder - Stargate SG-1 (Sci-Fi) as Cameron Mitchell; William Fichtner - Invasion (ABC) as Sheriff Tom Underlay; Julian McMahon - Nip/Tuck (FX) as Christian Troy; Wentworth Miller - Prison Break (Fox) as Michael Scofield; Tom Welling - Smallville (The WB) as Clark Kent	**Kristen Bell - Veronica Mars (UPN) as Veronica Mars**; Patricia Arquette - Medium (NBC) as Allison DuBois; Jennifer Garner - Alias (ABC) as Sydney Bristow; Jennifer Love Hewitt - Ghost Whisperer (CBS) as Melinda Gordon; Kristin Kreuk - Smallville (The WB) as Lana Lang; Evangeline Lilly - Lost (ABC) as Kate Austen
Best Television Supporting Actor	Best Television Supporting Actress
**James Callis - Battlestar Galactica (Sci-Fi) as Gaius Baltar**; Adewale Akinnuoye-Agbaje - Lost (ABC) as Mr. Eko; Jamie Bamber - Battlestar Galactica (Sci-Fi) as Lee Adama; Sam Neill - The Triangle (Sci-Fi) as Eric Benerall; Terry O'Quinn - Lost (ABC) as John Locke; Michael Rosenbaum - Smallville (The WB) as Lex Luthor	**Katee Sackhoff - Battlestar Galactica (Sci-Fi) as Kara Thrace**; Catherine Bell - The Triangle (Sci-Fi) as Emily Patterson; Claudia Black - Stargate SG-1 (Sci-Fi) as Vala Mal Doran; Erica Durance - Smallville (The WB) as Lois Lane; Allison Mack - Smallville (The WB) as Chloe Sullivan; Michelle Rodriguez - Lost (ABC) as Ana Lucia Cortez

=== DVD ===
Best DVD Release	Best Special Edition DVD Release
**Ray Harryhausen: The Early Years Collection**; Bionicle 3: Web of Shadows; Boo; Cube Zero; Dead & Breakfast; Ringers: Lord of the Fans	**Sin City: Recut, Extended, Unrated**; Donnie Darko; Eternal Sunshine of the Spotless Mind; The Incredibles; Lemony Snicket's A Series of Unfortunate Events; Saw
Best Classic Film DVD Release	Best DVD Movie Collection
**The Wizard of Oz: Three-Disc 65th Anniversary Collector's Edition**; Ben Hur: Four-Disc 45th Anniversary Collector's Edition; The Fly: Two-Disc Collector's Edition; Gladiator: Three-Disc Extended Edition; King Kong: Two-Disc Special Edition; Titanic: Three-Disc Special Collector's Edition	**The Bela Lugosi Collection**; Batman: The Motion Picture Anthology; The Hammer Horror Series; The Harold Lloyd Comedy Collection Vol. 1-3; Mystery Science Theater 3000 Vol. 7 & 8; The Val Lewton Collection
Best DVD Television Release	Best Retro Television Series on DVD
**Lost: Season 1**; Battlestar Galactica: Seasons 1 & 2.0; Frankenstein; House: Season 1; Smallville: Season 4; Star Trek: Enterprise - The Complete Series	**The Greatest American Hero: The Complete Series**; Third Rock From the Sun: Season: 1 & 2; Adventures of Superman: Season 1; Alfred Hitchcock Presents: Season 1; Kolchak: The Night Stalker - The Complete Series; Moonlighting: Seasons 1 & 2

== Special awards ==
=== Filmmaker's Showcase Award ===
- Shane Black

=== Rising Star Award ===
- Brandon Routh

=== George Pal Memorial Award ===
- Ray Harryhausen
