= The Exorcism of Emily Rose =

2005 film by Scott Derrickson

- Theatrical release poster
- Directed by: Scott Derrickson
- Written by: Paul Harris Boardman; Scott Derrickson
- Produced by: Tom Rosenberg; Gary Lucchesi; Paul Harris Boardman; Tripp Vinson; Beau Flynn
- Starring: Laura Linney; Tom Wilkinson; Campbell Scott; Colm Feore; Jennifer Carpenter; Mary Beth Hurt; Henry Czerny; Shohreh Aghdashloo
- Cinematography: Tom Stern
- Edited by: Jeff Betancourt
- Music by: Christopher Young
- Production companies: Lakeshore Entertainment; Firm Films; Mist Entertainment
- Distributed by: Screen Gems (through Sony Pictures Releasing)
- Release date: September 9, 2005
- Running time: 119 minutes
- Country: United States
- Language: English
- Budget: $19 million
- Box office: $145.2 million

The Exorcism of Emily Rose is a 2005 American supernatural horror legal drama film directed by Scott Derrickson, who co-wrote with Paul Harris Boardman. The cast includes Laura Linney, Tom Wilkinson, Campbell Scott, Colm Feore, Jennifer Carpenter, Mary Beth Hurt, Henry Czerny, and Shohreh Aghdashloo. The film follows a self-proclaimed agnostic (Linney) who acts as defense counsel representing a parish priest (Wilkinson) accused of negligent homicide after performing an exorcism. The story is loosely inspired by the real-life case of Anneliese Michel.

The Exorcism of Emily Rose was released theatrically on September 9, 2005, by Sony Pictures Releasing's Screen Gems. The film grossed $145.2 million against a budget of $19 million. It received mixed reviews from critics, while Carpenter's performance was praised. It won Best Horror Film at the 32nd Saturn Awards.

== Plot ==
Erin Bruner, an ambitious lawyer seeking promotion to senior partner, takes the case of Father Richard Moore, a Catholic diocesan priest charged with negligent homicide following an attempted exorcism of 19-year-old student Emily Rose. The archdiocese wants Moore to plead guilty to limit public attention, but he instead pleads not guilty. During the trial, witnesses' statements are shown through flashbacks.

Prosecutor Ethan Thomas questions doctors and neurologists to establish a medical explanation for Emily's death, particularly epilepsy and schizophrenia. Emily had abandoned her college studies after suffering recurrent delusions and muscle spasms at 3 a.m. She returned home and was treated with epilepsy and psychosis medication. When her condition failed to improve, Moore was consulted. Based on his observations, he concluded that Emily was experiencing demonic possession. With her parents' consent, he performed an exorcism, which failed. Moore believed her medication had prevented the demon's expulsion by suppressing her brain activity.

Determined to tell Emily's story, Moore testifies in court. Bruner subsequently experiences supernatural phenomena at home, repeatedly waking at 3 a.m. to the smell of burning material. Moore warns that she may have become a target, explaining that he experienced similar phenomena while preparing the exorcism. Bruner calls anthropologist Sadira Adani, who testifies about beliefs concerning spiritual possession across different cultures, but Thomas dismisses her evidence as nonsense.

Graham Cartwright, a medical doctor who witnessed the exorcism, gives Bruner a recording of the ceremony. Moore submits the tape as evidence, but Cartwright is killed by a car before he can testify and authenticate it or challenge the prosecution's medical explanation. A distressed Bruner retreats to her office, where her boss threatens to fire her if she allows Moore to testify again. She visits Moore in prison, and he persuades her to let him complete Emily's story despite the threat to her career.

Moore returns to the witness stand and reads a letter Emily wrote before her death. She described being visited by the Virgin Mary in a field the morning after the exorcism and being offered the choice of ascending to Heaven. Emily chose instead to endure her suffering, believing that people would come to believe in God if she could demonstrate that the devil was real. She later developed stigmata on her hands. Thomas argues that the markings were self-inflicted injuries rather than a divine sign.

The jury finds Moore guilty but unexpectedly asks Judge Brewster to impose a sentence of time served. Although initially surprised, Brewster agrees, and Moore is released. Bruner is offered a partnership at her firm but declines it. She and Moore later visit Emily's grave, where Moore says that Emily will eventually be declared a saint.

The epilogue reveals that Moore never appealed his conviction and withdrew into seclusion. Emily's story nevertheless had a profound effect on the public, and her gravesite became an unofficial holy shrine visited by people from around the world.

== Cast ==
- Laura Linney as Erin Christine Bruner
- Tom Wilkinson as Father Richard Moore
- Jennifer Carpenter as Emily Rose
- Campbell Scott as Ethan Thomas
- Colm Feore as Karl Gunderson
- Joshua Close as Jason
- Kenneth Welsh as Dr. Mueller
- Duncan Fraser as Dr. Graham Cartwright
- J. R. Bourne as Ray
- Mary Beth Hurt as Judge Brewster
- Henry Czerny as Dr. Briggs
- Shohreh Aghdashloo as Dr. Sadira Adani

== Production ==
The screenplay was written by director Scott Derrickson and Paul Harris Boardman; in honor of the contributions of Boardman and other collaborators on the film, Derrickson chose to forgo the traditional "film by" credit. According to Derrickson's DVD commentary, he chose Boardman as his co-writer because Derrickson sees himself as a believer and Boardman as a skeptic, and believed the pairing would provide the screenplay with two different perspectives, thus providing the film some ambiguity as to whether it supports a religious/supernatural interpretation of the events depicted, or a more secular/medical interpretation.

The character of Emily Rose was inspired by the story of Anneliese Michel. German director Hans-Christian Schmid made his own film of Michel's story, Requiem, around the same time in late 2006. Linney recommended Carpenter for this role after working with her in a play.

Adolescent Sara Niemietz was chosen as the vocalist for the soundtrack and score. Niemietz worked again with Christopher Young on The Uninvited (2009), and is now an independent artist and cast-member with Postmodern Jukebox.

== Reception ==
=== Box office ===
The Exorcism of Emily Rose made $75.1 million domestically, and $145.1 million worldwide against a $19 million budget. According to Derrickson, the film was not as successful as he hoped.

=== Critical reception ===
On the review aggregator website Rotten Tomatoes, the film holds an approval rating of 46%, based on 156 reviews. The site's critical consensus reads "Loosely based on a true story, The Exorcism of Emily Rose mixes compelling courtroom drama with generally gore-free scares in a ho-hum take on demonic cinema." On Metacritic, it has an overall score of 46 out of 100, based on 32 reviews. Audiences surveyed by CinemaScore gave the film a grade "B" on scale of A to F.

Roger Ebert of the Chicago Sun-Times gave the film a rating of three out of four stars, describing it as "intriguing and perplexing" and writing that "the screenplay is intelligent and open to occasional refreshing wit." Paul Arendt of BBC gave the film three out of five stars, referring to the "flashback story" as "high-octane schlock that occasionally works your nerves, thanks to a committed performance from Jennifer Carpenter". Olly Richards of Empire gave the film three out of five stars as well, writing that "Viewed as a horror movie, Emily Rose isn't much scarier than the average, but combined with intelligent and balanced courtroom drama it has more to offer than your usual big-lunged, big-breasted screamer."

Jerome Reuter of Scream magazine gave the film a rating of two out of five stars, writing that "The Exorcism of Emily Rose, while compelling at times, is nothing more than a blatant attempt to utilise a real human tragedy for an agenda." Ed Gonzalez of Slant Magazine gave the film one-and-a-half out of four stars, criticizing the "witless, didactic" screenplay and writing that "I've witnessed more complicated existential wrangling exchanged between two tokers."

In 2006, the Chicago Film Critics Association listed the film in their Top 100 Scariest Films Ever Made at #86. Jennifer Carpenter, whose "demonic" bodily contortions were often achieved without the aid of visual effects, won "Best Frightened Performance" at the MTV Movie Awards in 2006. Additionally, it received the award for Best Horror Film at the 32nd Saturn Awards.

== See also ==
- Anneliese: The Exorcist Tapes
- Exorcism: The Possession of Gail Bowers
- Possessed
- Exorcism of Roland Doe
