= Paul Harris Boardman =

American screenwriter and film producer

Paul Harris Boardman is an American screenwriter and film producer, best known for his work in the horror genre. Boardman has written screenplays and produced projects for various studios, networks, and production companies, including Netflix, TriStar, Disney, Miramax, NBC, Blumhouse, Lionsgate, Bruckheimer Films, IEG, APG, Sony, Lakeshore, AMC, Screen Gems, MTV, Fox, Universal and MGM.

== Early life ==
Boardman grew up in the Appalachian region of Southwest Virginia and East Tennessee, and graduated Phi Beta Kappa from Sewanee with honors degrees in English literature and psychology. At Sewanee, he was the editor, a columnist, and a cartoonist for the university newspaper (The Sewanee Purple), a trombonist in the university's wind ensemble, and played wide receiver on the football team. Boardman earned an M.A. in creative writing from Johns Hopkins University, and also studied at St John's College, Oxford, and the University of Southern California School of Cinematic Arts.

== Career ==
After writing his first feature scripts while still a student at USC's School of Cinematic Arts, Boardman began working with fellow screenwriter Scott Derrickson, working as a script doctor on Dracula 2000 and co-writing Urban Legends: Final Cut, and he also co-wrote and directed the second unit for Derrickson's directorial debut Hellraiser: Inferno, a direct-to-video sequel to the long-running horror franchise. In the early 2000s, Boardman and Derrickson co-wrote an adaptation of the epic sci-fi Hyperion novels by Dan Simmons that had Leonardo DiCaprio attached to star and Martin Scorsese attached as director. Boardman was the co-writer and producer of The Exorcism of Emily Rose (2005), Derrickson's critically praised second film, which premiered at the Venice Film Festival. He has also worked on production rewrites of The Messengers, Scream 4, and Poltergeist. Boardman produced the 2008 remake of The Day the Earth Stood Still for Fox. He wrote and produced Devil's Knot, about the West Memphis Three, based on the book by Mara Leveritt, starring Reese Witherspoon and Colin Firth and directed by Atom Egoyan. It had its world premiere at the 2013 Toronto Film Festival, and was released in 2014. In addition, Boardman wrote The Substitute for producer Sam Raimi, Mandate, and Columbia Pictures, and he wrote a suspense thriller, The Living, for Lakeshore Entertainment, which he was also attached to produce.

Boardman was co-writer and executive producer on Thunderstruck, a sci-fi drama pilot for AMC, and he co-wrote and was attached to executive produce a drama pilot for MTV. Boardman also adapted Stephen King's The Tommyknockers for The Konigsberg/Sanitsky Company and NBC.

In October 2011, it was announced that Boardman would co-write the horror-thriller Two Eyes Staring for Summit Entertainment, starring Charlize Theron, who was also attached to produce. In September 2012, it was announced that Boardman would adapt the James Patterson bestseller Guilty Wives for Maven Pictures, and also executive produce the film.

Boardman co-wrote and executive produced the supernatural thriller Deliver Us from Evil for Screen Gems and producer Jerry Bruckheimer. It began filming in June 2013 and was released on July 2, 2014. In October 2020, it was announced that Netflix had greenlit the supernatural horror series Archive 81, which Boardman wrote and developed based on the popular podcast created by Marc Sollinger and Daniel Powell, and Boardman will executive produce.

Boardman's other screenplays in development include The Birds for Universal Pictures, Mandalay Pictures, and Platinum Dunes, and Tom Slick, Mystery Hunter for Bluestone Entertainment and Teakwood Lane Productions.

== Filmography ==
Year	Film	Credit	Notes
1995	Love in the Ruins	Written by	Co-wrote with Scott Derrickson
2000	Urban Legends: Final Cut	Written by	Co-wrote with Scott Derrickson
2000	Hellraiser: Inferno	Written by, second unit director	Co-wrote with Scott Derrickson, direct-to-video
2000	Dracula 2000	Uncredited rewrite	Co-wrote with Scott Derrickson
2005	The Exorcism of Emily Rose	Written by, producer	Co-wrote with Scott Derrickson
2007	The Messengers	Uncredited rewrite	
2008	The Day the Earth Stood Still	Producer	
2011	Scream 4	Uncredited production rewrite	
2013	Devil's Knot	Screenplay by, producer	Co-wrote with Scott Derrickson
2014	Deliver Us from Evil	Screenplay by, producer	Co-wrote with Scott Derrickson
2015	Poltergeist	Uncredited script work	Co-wrote with Scott Derrickson
2016	Cell	Special thanks	
2022	Archive 81	Writer, developed by, executive producer	
