= War of the Worlds (2005 film) =

2005 film by Steven Spielberg

- Theatrical release poster
- Directed by: Steven Spielberg
- Screenplay by: Josh Friedman; David Koepp
- Based on: The War of the Worlds by H. G. Wells
- Produced by: Kathleen Kennedy; Colin Wilson
- Starring: Tom Cruise; Dakota Fanning; Justin Chatwin; Miranda Otto; Tim Robbins
- Cinematography: Janusz Kamiński
- Edited by: Michael Kahn
- Music by: John Williams
- Production companies: Paramount Pictures; DreamWorks Pictures; Amblin Entertainment; C/W Productions
- Distributed by: Paramount Pictures (Note: Distribution of War of the Worlds for all media was split between Paramount Pictures and DreamWorks Pictures. While Paramount handled worldwide theatrical and international home video distribution rights, DreamWorks handled worldwide television and domestic home video distribution rights to the film.)
- Release dates: June 23, 2005 (Ziegfeld Theatre); June 29, 2005 (United States)
- Running time: 116 minutes
- Country: United States
- Language: English
- Budget: $132 million
- Box office: $604 million

War of the Worlds is a 2005 American science fiction action thriller film (Note: Attributed to multiple references:) directed by Steven Spielberg and written by Josh Friedman and David Koepp, based on H. G. Wells's 1898 novel, The War of the Worlds. Tom Cruise stars in the main role alongside Dakota Fanning, Miranda Otto, and Tim Robbins, with narration by Morgan Freeman. It follows an American dock worker who must look after his estranged children as he struggles to protect and reunite them with their mother when extraterrestrials invade Earth and devastate cities with giant war machines.

Produced by Paramount Pictures, DreamWorks Pictures, Amblin Entertainment, and Cruise/Wagner Productions, the film was shot in 73 days, using five different sound stages as well as locations in California, Connecticut, New Jersey, New York, and Virginia. It was surrounded by a secrecy campaign so few details would be leaked before its release. Tie-in promotions were made with several companies, including Hitachi.

War of the Worlds premiered at the Ziegfeld Theatre on June 23, 2005, and was released theatrically by Paramount Pictures on June 29. The film was released on June 13, 2005, in Tokyo. The film received generally positive reviews, with praise for effectively capturing the thrilling and suspenseful elements of Wells's novel while modernizing the action and effects to appeal to contemporary audiences. It was also a commercial success, grossing $604 million worldwide against a $132 million production budget, making it the fourth-most successful film of 2005. It earned Academy Awards nominations for Best Visual Effects, Best Sound Mixing and Best Sound Editing.

== Plot ==
Charming but self-absorbed longshoreman Ray Ferrier, working as a crane operator in Brooklyn, New York, has his estranged children—teenage son Robbie and ten-year-old daughter Rachel—dropped off with him by his pregnant ex-wife Mary Ann while she visits her parents in Boston. After which, a thunderstorm strikes a nearby intersection multiple times, causing an electromagnetic pulse that immediately disables all electronic devices. Ray investigates the site of the impacts, where an earthquake begins, and witnesses a massive "tripod" war machine emerging from the ground, which uses energy weapons to begin disintegrating the witnesses.

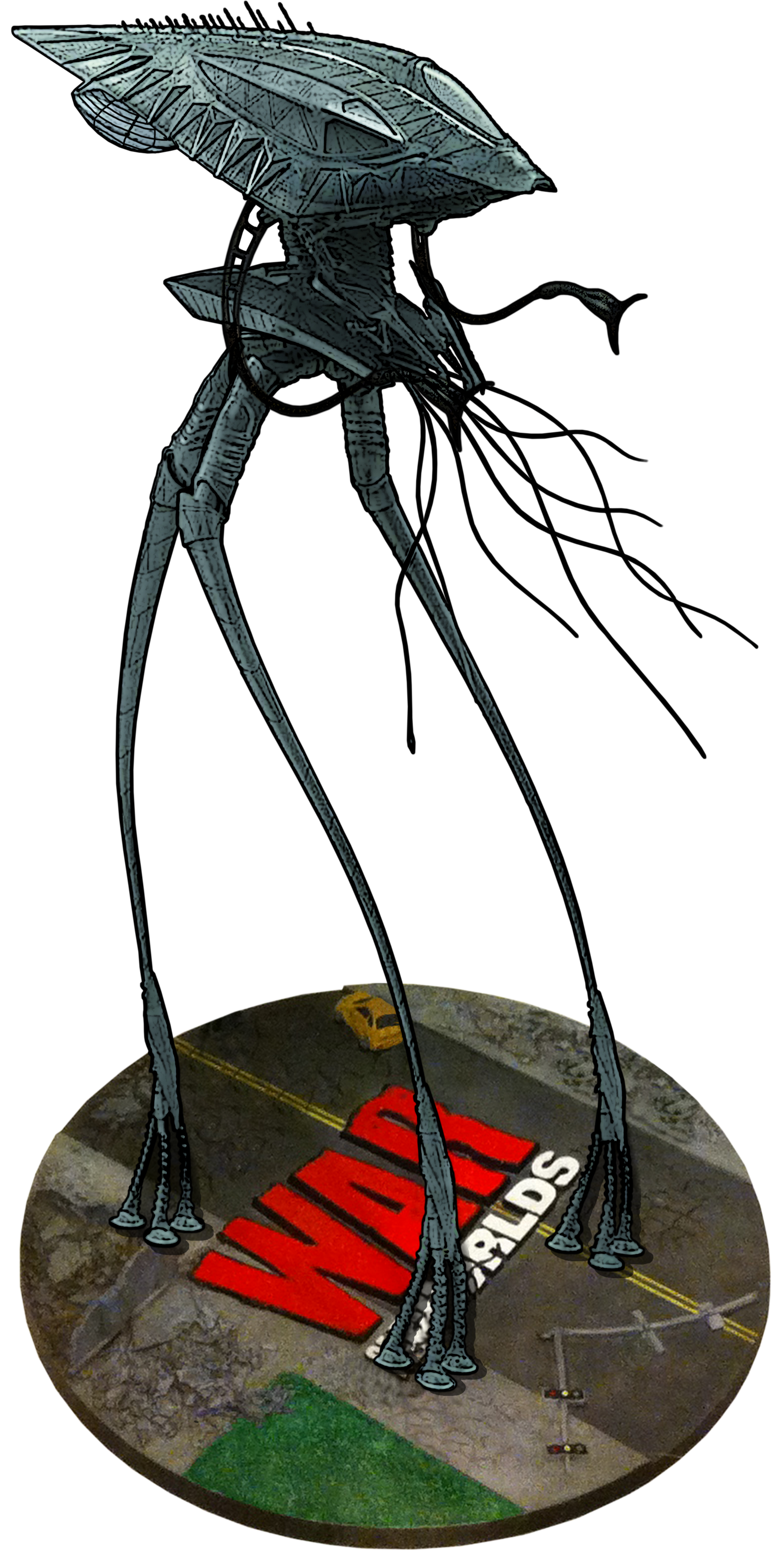
The Alien tripods used by the invaders

Ray gathers supplies and loads Rachel and Robbie into the only working vehicle and attempts to persuade his friend Manny to come with them, but is forced to leave due to a tripod attack. Ray drives his children to Mary Ann's empty suburban New Jersey home to take refuge, where a Boeing 747 crashes into the neighborhood. Ray meets a wandering television news team scavenging the wreckage, upon which a correspondent reveals that many tripods have attacked major cities around the world and that they are protected by force shields. She adds that the tripods' pilots seemingly traveled to Earth within the lightning storms to enter their machines, presumed to have been buried underground long ago.

Ray attempts to transport his children to Boston to their mother, but a desperate mob swarms their vehicle, forcing them to abandon it. After which, Ray is reunited with his friend Sheryl and her daughter, Nora, while trying to board a ferry crossing over the Hudson River, but are separated when the ferry is subsequently capsized by tripods that emerge from the water. Afterwards, to Ray and Rachel's dismay, Robbie joins in with a US military counter-offensive against the tripods, which is obliterated.

Now alone, Ray and Rachel are offered shelter in the home of a former ambulance driver, Harlan Ogilvy. While they remain undetected, tensions soon arise between Harlan and Ray, with Harlan insistent on fighting and killing the aliens, having heard that the Japanese military was successful in doing so in Osaka, while Ray prefers hiding with Rachel to avoid being killed by the aliens. After witnessing the aliens cultivating a red-colored vegetation across the landscape, fertilized by the tripods harvesting human blood and tissue, Harlan suffers a mental breakdown and, fearing that his loud shouting will alert the aliens, Ray reluctantly kills him.

Later that night, a martian probe then catches the Ferriers sleeping and Rachel is abducted by a tripod. Ray chases after the tripod and, after grabbing a grenade belt from an abandoned Humvee, intentionally allows himself to be abducted. With the help of other abductees, Ray destroys the tripod from within with the grenades. Ray and Rachel eventually reach Boston, where they find the alien vegetation withering and the tripods inexplicably collapsing. When another tripod appears, Ray realizes the force shields are disabled after seeing birds landing on it, and alerts soldiers escorting the crowds, who shoot it down with Javelin missiles. Ray and Rachel finally arrive at Mary Ann's parents' house, reuniting with Mary Ann and Robbie, who survived. It is explained that the aliens died as, unlike humans and animals, they had no immunity from the microbes and viruses inhabiting Earth.

== Cast ==
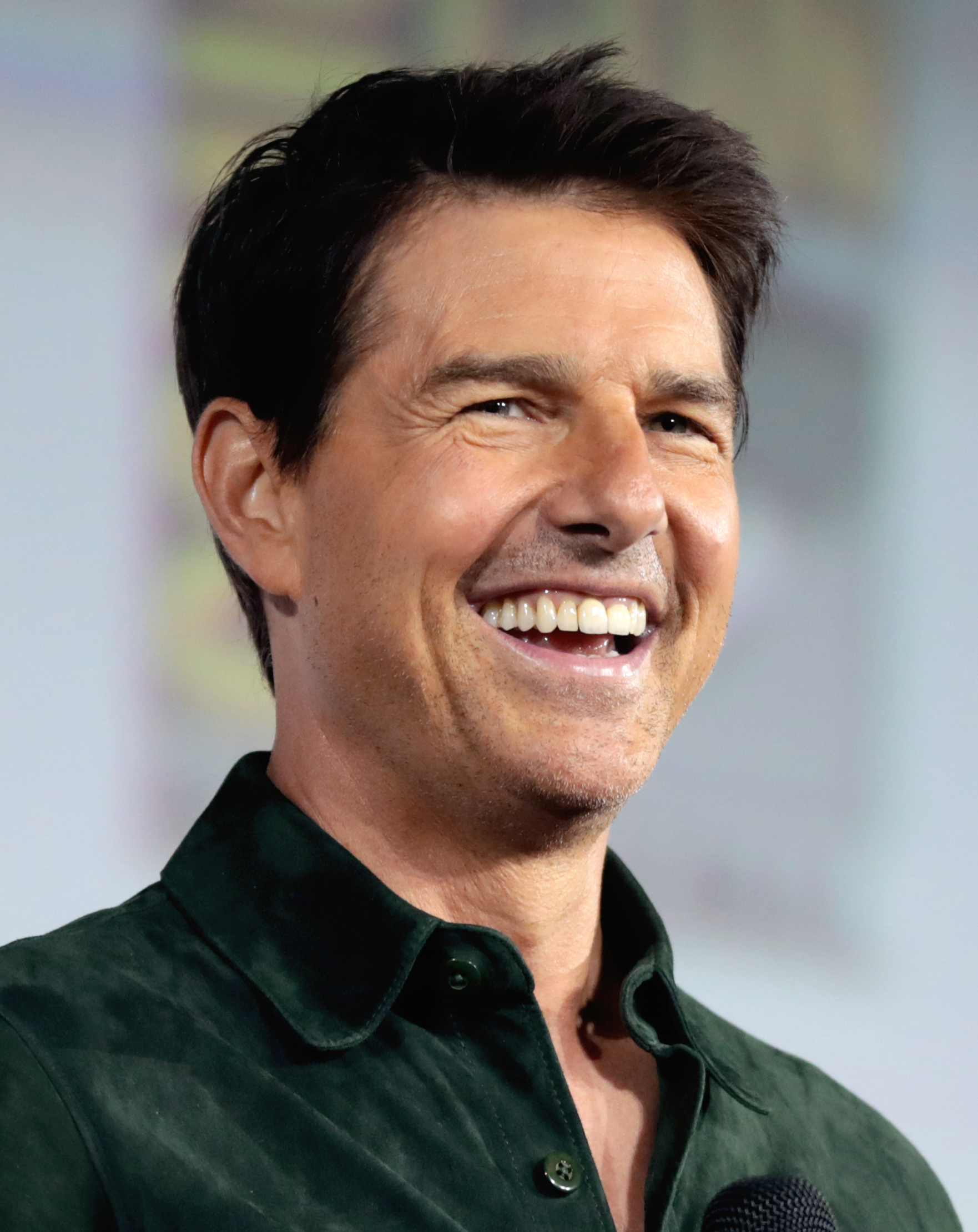
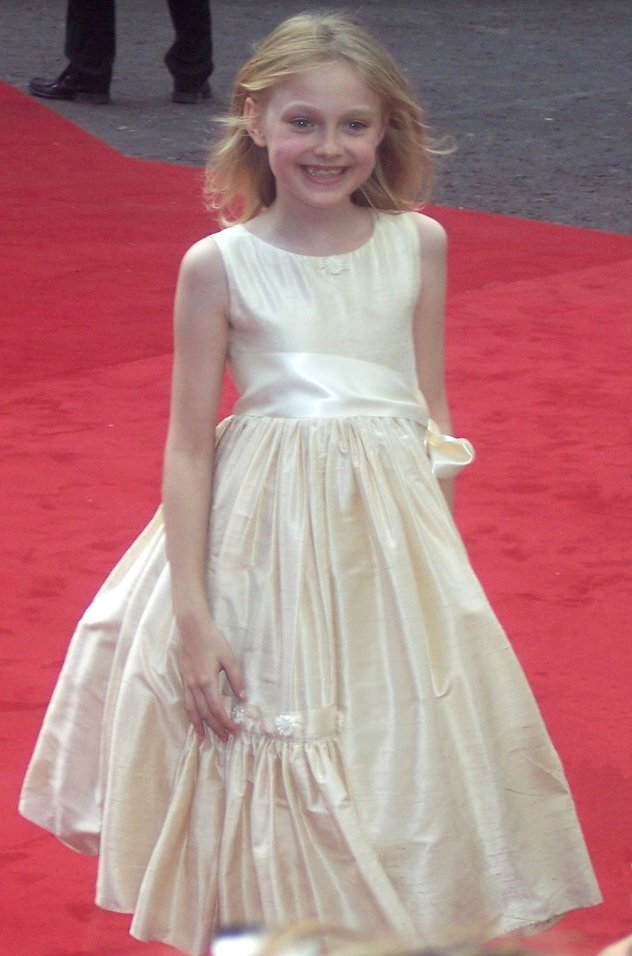
Tom Cruise and Dakota Fanning portray the two main characters of the film.
- Tom Cruise as Ray Ferrier, a crane operator and Rachel and Robbie's father
- Dakota Fanning as Rachel Ferrier, Ray and Mary Ann's 10-year-old daughter and Robbie's younger sister
- Miranda Otto as Mary Ann Ferrier, Ray's pregnant former wife and Rachel and Robbie's mother
- Tim Robbins as Harlan Ogilvy, a former ambulance driver who is insistent on fighting and killing the aliens
- Justin Chatwin as Robbie Ferrier, Rachel's older brother and Ray and Mary Ann's teenage son
- Rick Gonzalez as Vincent, Ray and Julio's friend
- Yul Vazquez as Julio, Ray and Vincent's friend
- Lenny Venito as Manny the Mechanic, Ray's friend and a mechanic
- Lisa Ann Walter as Sheryl, Ray's friend
- Ann Robinson as Grandmother (she played the lead role of Sylvia van Buren in the 1953 film)
- Gene Barry as Grandfather (he played the lead role of Dr. Clayton Forrester in the 1953 film)
- David Alan Basche as Tim, Mary Ann's husband and Robbie and Rachel's step-father
- Roz Abrams as Herself
- Camillia Sanes as News Producer
- Amy Ryan as Neighbor with Toddler
- David Harbour as Dock Worker (deleted scene)
- Danny Hoch as Policeman
- Morgan Freeman as The Narrator (voice)
- Columbus Short as Soldier
- Daniel Franzese as National Guardsman
- Dee Bradley Baker as Alien Vocals (uncredited)
- Channing Tatum as The Boy in the Church
- Ty Simpkins as 3-Year-Old Boy

== Production ==
=== Development ===
After collaborating on 2002's Minority Report, Steven Spielberg and Tom Cruise were interested in working together again. Spielberg stated about Cruise, "He's such an intelligent, creative partner, and brings such great ideas to the set that we just spark each other. I love working with Tom Cruise." Cruise met with Spielberg during the filming of Spielberg's Catch Me If You Can (2002) and gave three options of films to create together, one of them being an adaptation of The War of the Worlds. Spielberg chose The War of the Worlds and stated, "We looked at each other and the lights went on. As soon as I heard it, I said 'Oh my God! War of the Worlds – absolutely.' That was it."

The film is Spielberg's third on the subject of alien visitation, along with Close Encounters of the Third Kind (1977) and E.T. the Extra-Terrestrial (1982). Producer and longtime collaborator Kathleen Kennedy notes that with War of the Worlds, Spielberg had the opportunity to explore the antithesis of the characters brought to life in E.T. and Close Encounters of the Third Kind. "When we first started developing E.T., it was a much edgier, darker story and it actually evolved into something that was more benign. I think that the edgier, darker story has always been somewhere inside him. Now, he's telling that story." Spielberg stated that he just thought it would be fun to make a "really scary film with really scary aliens", something which he had never done before. Spielberg cited Ridley Scott's Alien (1979) for inspiration for the film. Spielberg was intent on telling a contemporary story, with Kennedy stating the story was created as a fantasy, but depicted in a hyper-realistic way.

"For the first time in my life I'm making an alien picture where there is no love and no attempt at communication."
– Steven Spielberg

J. J. Abrams was asked by Spielberg and Cruise to write the script but had to turn down the offer as he was working on the pilot for his television series Lost. Josh Friedman delivered a screenplay, which was then rewritten by David Koepp. After re-reading the novel, Koepp decided to do the script following a single narrator, "a very limited point of view, from someone on the very periphery of events rather than someone involved in events", and created a list of elements he would not use due to being "cliché", such as the destruction of landmark buildings. Some aspects of the book were heavily adapted and condensed: Tim Robbins' character was an amalgam of two characters in the book, with the name borrowed from a third. While changing the setting from 19th century to present day, Koepp also tried to "take the modern world back to the 1800s", with the characters being devoid of electricity and modern techniques of communication.

Spielberg accepted the script after finding it had several similarities to his personal life, including the divorce of his parents (Ray and Mary Ann), and because the plight of the fictional survivors reflects his own uncertainty after the devastation of the September 11 attacks. For Spielberg, the characters' stories of survival needed to be the main focus, as they featured the American mindset of never giving up. Spielberg described War of the Worlds as "a polar opposite" to Close Encounters, with that movie featuring a man leaving family to travel with aliens, while War of the Worlds focused on keeping the family together. At the same time, the aliens and their motivations would not be much explored, as "we just experience the results of these nefarious plans to replace us with themselves".

Although accepting the script, Spielberg asked for several changes. Spielberg had been against the idea of the aliens arriving in spaceships, since every alien invasion movie used such a vehicle. The original Martian cylinders were discarded and Spielberg replaced the origins of the tripods, stating they were buried underground in the Earth long ago.

In August 2004, Dakota Fanning was hired to portray a major role in the film. Spielberg had Miranda Otto in mind for the part of Mary Ann, but at the time he called her she was pregnant and thought the opportunity would be missed. Spielberg then decided to incorporate Otto's pregnancy into the film, changing the part for her.

=== Filming ===
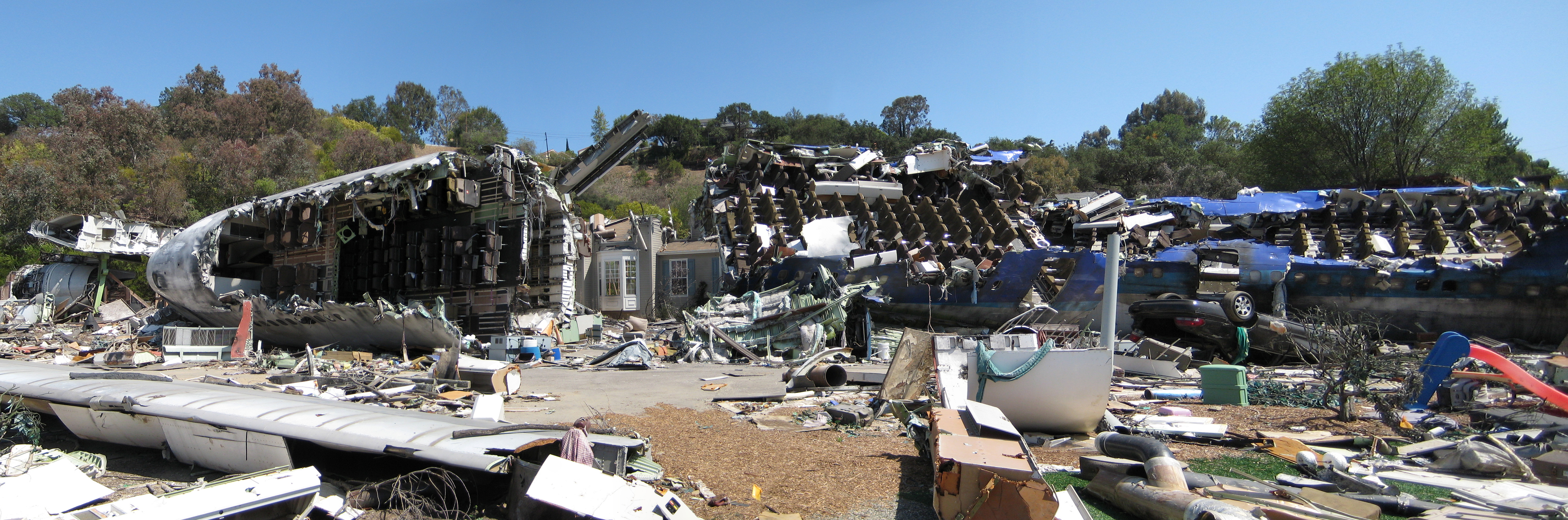
Destroyed Boeing 747 used on the War of the Worlds set (ex-All Nippon Airways). Currently, visitors can view the destroyed airliner set during the Universal Studios Hollywood's Studio Tour.

Filming took place in Virginia, Connecticut, New Jersey, California, and New York. The film shooting lasted an estimated 73 days. Spielberg originally intended to shoot War of the Worlds after Munich (2005), but Tom Cruise liked David Koepp's script so much that he suggested Spielberg postpone the former while he would do the same with Mission: Impossible III (2006). Most of Munich's crew was brought in to work on War of the Worlds as well. In 2004, the production crews quickly were set up on both coasts to prepare for the start date, scouting locations up and down the Eastern Seaboard and preparing stages and sets which would be used when the company returned to Los Angeles after the winter holiday. Pre-production took place in only three months, essentially half the amount of time normally allotted for a film of similar size and scope. Spielberg notes, however, "This wasn't a cram course for War of the Worlds. This was my longest schedule in about 12 years. We took our time." Spielberg collaborated with crews at the beginning of pre-production with the use of previsualization, considering the tight schedule.

The scene depicting the first appearance of the Tripods was filmed at the intersection of Ferry Street, Merchant Street, and Wilson Avenue, in Newark, New Jersey. Later, Spielberg filmed several scenes in Virginia.

The ferry scene was filmed in the New York town of Athens, and Mary Ann's parents' house was located in Brooklyn (but was featured in the film as Boston). For the neighborhood plane crash scene, the production crew bought a retired Boeing 747 formerly operated by All Nippon Airways as JA8147, with transportation costs of $2 million, dismantled it into several pieces, and built houses around them. The destroyed plane was kept for the Universal Studios back-lot tour. Ferrier's house was filmed in Bayonne, New Jersey (with a soundstage doubling the interior); meanwhile, the valley war sequence was filmed in Lexington, Virginia and Mystery Mesa in California. The scene where the tripod is shot down and crashes through a factory was filmed in Naugatuck, Connecticut at an abandoned chemical plant. The scene of the bodies floating down the river was filmed on the Farmington River in Windsor, Connecticut by a second unit directed by Vic Armstrong using a stand in for Dakota Fanning shot from behind with the portion showing the faces of the credited actors cut in later. Some filming was shot on the Korean War Veterans Parkway in Staten Island, New York. The film used six sound stages, spread over three studio lots.

Principal photography began on November 8, 2004, and wrapped on March 7, 2005.

=== Design and visual effects ===
Industrial Light & Magic was the main special effects company for the movie. While Spielberg had used computers to help visualize sequences in pre-production before, Spielberg said, "This is the first film I really tackled using the computer to animate all the storyboards." He decided to employ the technique extensively after a visit to his friend George Lucas. In order to keep the realism, the usage of computer-generated imagery shots and bluescreen was limited, with most of the digital effects being blended with miniature and live-action footage.

The design of the Tripods was described by Spielberg as "graceful", with artist Doug Chiang taking inspiration from aquatic life forms. The director wanted a design that would be iconic while still paying tribute to the original Tripods, as well as intimidating so the audience would not be more interested in the aliens inside than in the vehicle itself. The visual effects crew tried to blend organic and mechanical elements in the Tripods depiction, and made extensive studies for the movements of the vehicle to be believable, considering the "contradiction" of having a large tank-like head being carried by thin and flexible legs. Animator Randal M. Dutra considered the movements themselves to have a "terrestrial buoyance", in that they were walking on land but had an aquatic flow, and Spielberg described the Tripods as moving like "scary ballet dancers". Most of the alien elements revolved around the number three: the Tripod had three eyes, and both the vehicle and the aliens had three main limbs with three fingers each.

Visual effects supervisor Pablo Helman considered depicting the scale of the Tripod as challenging, considering "Steven wanted to make sure that these creatures were 150 feet tall", as it was the height described by Wells in the novel. The aliens themselves had designs based on jellyfish, with movements inspired by red-eyed tree frogs, and an amphibian quality particularly on the wet skin. A styrofoam alien was used as a stand-in to guide the actors in the basement scene. Spielberg did not want any blood or gore during the Heat-Ray deaths; in the words of Helman, "this was going to be a horror movie for kids". So the effects crew came up with the vaporization of the bodies, and considering it could not be fully digital due to both the complexity of the effect and the schedule, live-action dust was used alongside the CGI ray assimilation and particles. Digital birds followed the Tripods in most scenes to symbolize the presence of death, which Chiang compared to vultures and added that "you don't know if these birds are going to the danger or away from it, if you should follow them or run away."

During the scene where Ferrier's stolen minivan is attacked by a mob, Janusz Kaminski and Spielberg wanted a lot of interactive lights, so they added different kinds of lights, including Coleman lamps, oil lanterns, flashlights and Maglights. The IL&M crew admitted that the destruction of the Bayonne Bridge was the toughest scene to be made with heavy usage mix of CGI effects and live action elements, and a four-week deadline so the shot could be used in a Super Bowl trailer. The scene originally had only a gas station exploding, but then Spielberg suggested blowing up the bridge as well. The scene involved Tripods shooting a Heat-Ray toward the minivan; the minivan's escape involved a lot of CGI layers to work out. Over 500 CGI effects were used in the film.

Costume designer Joanna Johnston created 60 different versions of Ferrier's leather jacket, to illustrate the degrees to which he is weathered from the beginning of the journey to the end. "He begins with the jacket, a hoodie, and two t-shirts," explains Johnston. One piece of Dakota Fanning's costume that takes on a special importance is her lavender horse purse: "I wanted her to have something that made her feel safe, some little thing that she could sleep with and put over her face," Johnston notes. "That was the lavender horse purse. We tied it up on a ribbon and Dakota hung it on her body, so it was with her at all times." Johnston dressed Robbie for an unconscious emulation of his father, "They're more alike than they realize, with great tension on the surface," Johnston says.

== Soundtrack ==
Longtime Spielberg collaborator John Williams composed the score. He decided not to compose Harry Potter and the Goblet of Fire in favor of War of the Worlds, as well as Star Wars: Episode III – Revenge of the Sith, Memoirs of a Geisha and Munich. A soundtrack album was released on June 21, 2005, by Decca Records, followed by an expanded "limited edition" soundtrack released through Intrada Records in 2020.

== Themes ==
The film was described as an anti-war film, as civilians run and only try to save themselves and their family instead of fighting back against the alien Tripods. Debra J. Saunders of San Francisco Chronicle described the film as "If aliens invade, don't fight back. Run." Saunders compared the film to Independence Day, where the civilians do run, but they support the military efforts. Many reviewers felt that the film tried to recreate the atmosphere of the September 11 attacks, with bystanders struggling to survive and the usage of missing-persons displays. Spielberg declared to Reader's Digest that beside the work being a fantasy, the threat represented was real: "They are a wake-up call to face our fears as we confront a force intent on destroying our way of life." Screenwriter David Koepp stated that he tried not to put explicit references to September 11 or the Iraq War, but said that the inspiration for the scene where Robbie joins the Marines was teenagers fighting in the Gaza Strip —"I was thinking of teenagers in Gaza throwing bottles and rocks at tanks, and I think that when you're that age you don't fully consider the ramifications of what you're doing and you're very much caught up in the moment and passion, whether that's a good idea or not." Retained from the novel is the aliens being defeated, not by men's weapons, but the planet's smallest creatures, bacteria, which Koepp described as "nature, in a way, knowing a whole lot more than we do".

Lawrence Brown wrote: "Spielberg's decision to present the invaders' fighting machines as having been there all along, buried deep under the Earth, raises questions which did not exist in the original Wells book. In Spielberg's version, these invaders had been here before, long ago, in prehistoric times. They had set up their machines deep underground, and departed. Why? Why not take over the Earth right there and then? Spielberg does not provide an answer, and the characters are too busy surviving to wonder about this. An answer suggests itself—a very chilling answer. The invaders were interested in humans as food animals. When they came here before, humans were very scarce. The aliens left their hidden machines and departed, patiently observing the Earth until humans would multiply to the requisite numbers—and then they came back, to take over. Under this interpretation, all of us—all humans over the whole of history—have been livestock living in an alien food farm, destined to be 'harvested'".

== Release ==
War of the Worlds premiered at the Ziegfeld Theatre on June 23, 2005. There, Tom Cruise revealed his relationship with Katie Holmes. Six days later, on June 29, the film was released in approximately 3,908 theaters across America. The home video was released on November 22, 2005.

=== Secrecy ===
Spielberg kept most of the parts secret in the filmmaking, as the cast and crew were left confused about how the aliens looked. When asked about the secrecy of the screenplay, David Koepp answered, "[Spielberg] wouldn't give [the screenplay] to anybody." Koepp explained he would e-mail it to him, and he would give a section of the script that was relating to whatever somebody was doing. Miranda Otto thought of not even discussing the story with her family and friends. Otto said, "I know some people who always say, 'Oh, everything's so secret.' I think it's good. In the old days people didn't get to know much about movies before they came out and nowadays there's just so much information. I think a bit of mystery is always really good. You don't want to blow all of your cards beforehand."

Spielberg admitted after keeping things secret for so long, there is in the end the temptation to reveal too much to the detriment of the story at the press conference of War of the Worlds. So, Spielberg only revealed the hill scene, where Ferrier tries to stop his son from leaving, stating "to say more would reveal too much." The actual budget of the film was $132 million.

According to Vanity Fair, Spielberg's relations with Cruise were "poor" during the film's release because Spielberg believed Cruise's "antics" at the time (such as an erratic appearance on the Oprah Winfrey show) had "hurt" the film; also, a doctor whose name Spielberg had given to Cruise was picketed by Scientologists.

=== Marketing and home media releases ===
Paramount Pictures Interactive Marketing debuted a human survival online game on its official website on April 14 to promote the film. Hitachi collaborated with Paramount Pictures for a worldwide promotional campaign, under the title of "The Ultimate Visual Experience". The agreement was announced by Kazuhiro Tachibana, general manager of Hitachi's Consumer Business Group. Kazuhiro stated, "Our 'The Ultimate Visual Experience' campaign is a perfect match between Spielberg and Cruise's pursuit of the world's best in film entertainment and Hitachi's commitment to the highest picture quality through its digital consumer electronic products."

The film was released on VHS and DVD on November 22, 2005, with both a single-disc edition and a two-disc special edition which included production featurettes, documentaries and various trailers. The film grossed $113 million in DVD sales, bringing its total film gross to $704,745,540, ranking tenth place in the 2005 DVD sales chart. Paramount released the film on Blu-ray Disc on June 1, 2010.

== Reception ==
=== Box office ===
On June 29, 2005, the film grossed $81 million worldwide, and earned the 38th-biggest opening week by grossing $98.8 million in 3,908 theaters, an average of $25,288. On Independence Day weekend, it grossed $64.9 million, an average of $16,601, and gave Tom Cruise his biggest opening weekend, replacing Mission: Impossible 2. This record would last until the release of Top Gun: Maverick in May 2022. It was the second-biggest film opening on Independence Day weekend, after Spider-Man 2. During its first five days of release, it made $100.2 million, breaking The Lost World: Jurassic Park's record for being the fastest Steven Spielberg film to reach $100 million. It earned $200 million in 24 days, ranking 37th in the list of fastest films to gross $200 million. It went on to make a total gross of $603.9 million worldwide. The film would remain as Tom Cruise's highest-grossing film until 2011 when it was dethroned by Mission: Impossible – Ghost Protocol. Overall, it was the fourth-highest-grossing film of 2005.

=== Critical response ===
On Rotten Tomatoes, War of the Worlds holds an approval rating of 76% based on 265 reviews, and an average rating of 7/10. The site's critical consensus states: "Steven Spielberg's adaptation of War of the Worlds delivers on the thrill and paranoia of H.G. Wells' classic novel while impressively updating the action and effects for modern audiences." Review aggregator website Metacritic gave the film an average score of 73 out of 100 based on 40 critics, indicating "generally favorable reviews". Audiences polled by CinemaScore gave the film an average grade of "B+" on an A+ to F scale.

James Berardinelli praised the acting and considered that focusing the narrative on the struggle of one character made the film more effective, but described the ending as weak, even though Spielberg "does the best he can to make it cinematically dramatic". Total Film's review gave War of the Worlds four out of five stars, considering that "Spielberg finds fresh juice in a tale already adapted for film, TV, stage, radio and record", and describing the film as having many "startling images", comparing the first Tripod attack to the Omaha Beach landing from Saving Private Ryan.

Los Angeles Times' Kenneth Turan, who commended the film's special effects, stated that Spielberg may actually have done his job in War of the Worlds "better than he realizes". Turan claimed that, by "showing us how fragile our world is", Spielberg raises a provocative question: "Is the ultimate fantasy an invasion from outer space, or is it the survival of the human race?" However, Broomfield Enterprise's Dan Marcucci and Nancy Serougi did not share Berardinelli and Turan's opinion. They felt that Morgan Freeman's narration was unnecessary, and that the first half was "great" but the second half "became filled with clichés, riddled with holes, and tainted by Tim Robbins".

Michael Wilmington of the Chicago Tribune gave the film three-and-a-half stars out of four, writing "War of the Worlds definitely wins its battle, but not the war." Wilmington stated that the film "takes [viewers] on a wild journey through two sides of [Spielberg]: the dark and the light." He also said the film contained a core sentiment similar to that of Spielberg's E.T. the Extra-Terrestrial. About.com's Rebecca Murray gave a positive review, stating, "Spielberg almost succeeds in creating the perfect alien movie", with criticism only for the ending.

Jonathan Rosenbaum of Chicago Reader criticized the film as "shamelessly hokey", but was relatively more favorable towards the special effects and Cruise's performance. Roger Ebert criticized the "retro design" and considered that despite the big budget, the alien invasion was "rudimentary" and "not very interesting", regarding the best scenes as Ferrier walking among the airliner wreckage and a train running in flames, declaring that "such scenes seem to come from a kind of reality different from that of the tripods."

The French film magazine Cahiers du cinéma ranked the film as 8th place in its list of best films of the 2000s. It is also Spielberg's first film to make the magazine's annual listings of the top 10 films of the year, which would be followed by Lincoln (2012), The Post (2017) and The Fabelmans (2022). Japanese film director Kiyoshi Kurosawa listed the film as the best film of 2000–2009.

== Accolades ==
Award	Date of the ceremony	Category	Recipients	Result	Ref.
Golden Trailer Awards	26 May 2005	Summer 2005 Blockbuster	War of the Worlds	Won	
Golden Trailer Awards	26 May 2005	Best Action	War of the Worlds	Won	
Teen Choice Awards	16 August 2005	Choice Summer Movie	War of the Worlds	Nominated	
Irish Film & Television Academy	5 November 2005	Best International Actress	Dakota Fanning	Nominated	
Satellite Awards	17 December 2005	Best Editing	Michael Kahn	Nominated	
Satellite Awards	17 December 2005	Best Visual Effects	Dennis Muren, Pablo Helman, Randal M. Dutra, and Dan Sudick	Nominated	
Satellite Awards	17 December 2005	Outstanding Overall DVD	War of the Worlds	Nominated	
St. Louis Film Critics Association	8 January 2006	Best Cinematography or Visual/Special Effects	Dennis Muren, Pablo Helman, Randal M. Dutra, and Dan Sudick	Nominated	
Critics' Choice Movie Awards	9 January 2006	Best Young Performer	Dakota Fanning	Won	
Central Ohio Film Critics Association	12 January 2006	Best Sound Design	War of the Worlds	Won	
Visual Effects Society	16 February 2006	Best Single Visual Effect of the Year	"Fleeing the Neighborhood" – Dennis Muren, Pablo Helman, Sandra Scott, and Marshall Krasser	Won	
Visual Effects Society	16 February 2006	Outstanding Model in a Photoreal or Animated Project	Ed Hirsh, Steve Gawley, Joshua Ong, and Russell Paul	Won	
Visual Effects Society	16 February 2006	Outstanding Compositing & Lighting in a Feature	Marshall Krasser, Michael Jamieson, Jeff Saltzman, and Regan Mcgee	Won	
Golden Raspberry Awards	4 March 2006	Worst Actor	Tom Cruise	Nominated	
Academy Awards	5 March 2006	Best Sound Editing	Richard King	Nominated	
Academy Awards	5 March 2006	Best Sound Mixing	Andy Nelson, Anna Behlmer, and Ron Judkins	Nominated	
Academy Awards	5 March 2006	Best Visual Effects	Dennis Muren, Pablo Helman, Randal M. Dutra, and Dan Sudick	Nominated	
Empire Awards	13 March 2006	Best Film	War of the Worlds	Nominated	
Empire Awards	13 March 2006	Best Director	Steven Spielberg	Nominated	
Empire Awards	13 March 2006	Scene of the Year	The Arrival	Nominated	
Saturn Awards	2 May 2006	Best Science Fiction Film	War of the Worlds	Nominated	
Saturn Awards	2 May 2006	Best Director	Steven Spielberg	Nominated	
Saturn Awards	2 May 2006	Best Actor	Tom Cruise	Nominated	
Saturn Awards	2 May 2006	Best Performance by a Younger Actor	Dakota Fanning	Won	
Saturn Awards	2 May 2006	Best Writing	David Koepp	Nominated	
Saturn Awards	2 May 2006	Best Music	John Williams	Nominated	
Saturn Awards	2 May 2006	Best Special Effects	Dennis Muren, Pablo Helman, Randal M. Dutra, and Dan Sudick	Nominated	
BMI Film & TV Awards	17 May 2006	Film Music Award	John Williams	Won	
MTV Movie & TV Awards	3 June 2006	Best Scared-As-Shit Performance	Dakota Fanning	Nominated	
Las Vegas Film Critics Society	18 December 2006	Youth in Film	Dakota Fanning	Won	

== See also ==
- List of works based on The War of the Worlds
