= Pablo Helman =

Argentine visual effects supervisor

- Born: July 5, 1959 (age 67); Buenos Aires, Argentina
- Occupation: Visual effects supervisor
- Years active: 1995–present

Pablo Helman (born July 5, 1959) is an Argentine visual effects supervisor. He was nominated for four Academy Awards for his work on the films Star Wars: Episode II – Attack of the Clones (2002), War of the Worlds (2005), The Irishman (2019) and Wicked (2024).

== Visual effects supervisor ==
Year	Title	Director	Notes
2001	The Pledge	Sean Penn	
2002	Star Wars: Episode II - Attack of the Clones	George Lucas	
2003	Terminator 3: Rise of the Machines	Jonathan Mostow	
2003	Master and Commander: The Far Side of the World	Peter Weir	
2004	The Chronicles of Riddick	David Twohy	
2004	The Bourne Supremacy	Paul Greengrass	
2005	War of the Worlds	Steven Spielberg	
2005	Munich	Steven Spielberg	
2008	Indiana Jones and the Kingdom of the Crystal Skull	Steven Spielberg	Also aerial unit director
2008	The Spiderwick Chronicles	Mark Waters	
2010	The Last Airbender	M. Night Shyamalan	
2012	Battleship	Peter Berg	
2013	Pain & Gain	Michael Bay	
2014	Teenage Mutant Ninja Turtles	Jonathan Liebesman	Also second unit director
2016	Teenage Mutant Ninja Turtles: Out of the Shadows	Dave Green	Also second unit director
2016	Silence	Martin Scorsese	
2017	The Mummy	Alex Kurtzman	
2019	The Irishman	Martin Scorsese	
2020	Mank	David Fincher	
2022	The Fabelmans	Steven Spielberg	
2023	Killers of the Flower Moon	Martin Scorsese	
2024	Wicked	Jon M. Chu	

== Awards and nominations ==
- 2003: Nominated, 75th Academy Awards for Best Visual Effects, Star Wars: Episode II – Attack of the Clones with Rob Coleman, John Knoll and Ben Snow
- 2003: Won, 29th Saturn Awards for Special Special Effects, Star Wars: Episode II – Attack of the Clones with Rob Coleman, John Knoll and Ben Snow.
- 2006: Nominated, 78th Academy Awards for Best Visual Effects, War of the Worlds with Randal M. Dutra, Dennis Muren and Daniel Sudick
- 2019: Won, Visual Effects Society Award for Outstanding Supporting Visual Effects in a Feature Motion Picture, The Irishman, with Leandro Estebecorena, Mitchell Ferm, Jill Brooks and Jeff Brink
- 2020: Nominated, 92nd Academy Awards for Best Visual Effects, The Irishman with Leandro Estebecorena Nelson Sepulveda-Fauser, and Stephane Grabil
- 2024: Nominated, 97th Academy Awards for Best Visual Effects, Wicked with Jonathan Fawkner, David Shirk and Paul Corbould
