= Guilty Wives =

Book by James Patterson

- First edition
- Author: James Patterson and David Ellis
- Language: American English
- Genre: Thriller novel
- Publisher: Little, Brown and Co.
- Publication date: March 26, 2012
- Publication place: United States
- Media type: Print (hardcover)
- Pages: 448 pp (first edition, hardcover)
- ISBN: 1607884682 (for first hardcover edition)

Guilty Wives is a stand-alone James Patterson novel, as it is not part any of the series novels written by Patterson.

== Plot ==
This book is about four friends who are foreigners living in Bern, Switzerland, with their husbands. These four women decide to have a four-day holiday at a lavish resort overlooking Monte Carlo, on the French coast. For two days they have a lavish time, sunbathing at the pool, gambling with loads of money, dining on expensive food and drinking only the best champagne. On the second night they are invited to spend a night on an expensive yacht in the harbor. After having a drunken, indulgent night on the yacht they wake up to police raiding the harbor, taking everyone off all the boats there. Next, they find themselves accused of a horrible crime they did not commit. The only evidence implicates the four wives. They stand accused in court, facing years, if not their entire lives, in prison.
