= Randal M. Dutra =

- Born: Randal Michael Dutra III
- Other names: Randy Dutra; Randal Dutra; Randy M. Dutra
- Occupation: Visual effects artist
- Years active: 1983-present

Randal M. Dutra is a special effects artist.

== Oscar history ==
Best Visual Effects:

- 70th Academy Awards-Nominated for The Lost World: Jurassic Park. Nomination shared with Michael Lantieri, Dennis Muren and Stan Winston. Lost to Titanic.
- 78th Academy Awards-Nominated for War of the Worlds. Nomination shared with Pablo Helman, Dennis Muren and Daniel Sudick. Lost to King Kong.

== Selected filmography ==
- Return of the Jedi (1983)
- Gremlins (1984)
- Prehistoric Beast (1984)
- Dinosaur! (1985)
- RoboCop (1987)
- Willow (1988)
- Jurassic Park (1993)
- The Lost World: Jurassic Park (1997)
- War of the Worlds (2005)
- Jurassic World (2015)
