= Big Bad Wolves (soundtrack) =

Big Bad Wolves (Original Motion Picture Soundtrack)

Film score by Frank Ilfman
- Released: 17 December 2013
- Recorded: 23 December 2012
- Studio: AIR, London
- Genre: Film score
- Length: 54:12
- Label: MovieScore Media

Frank Ilfman chronology
Cupcakes (2013)	Big Bad Wolves (Original Motion Picture Soundtrack) (2013)	Shadow in Baghdad (2013)

Big Bad Wolves (Original Motion Picture Soundtrack) is the film score soundtrack to the 2013 Israeli film Big Bad Wolves, directed by Aharon Keshales and Navot Papushado. The film score is composed by Frank Ilfman and released under the MovieScore Media label on 17 December 2013, to positive reviews from critics and won the Saturn Award for Best Music.

== Background ==
The film is scored by Frank Ilfman who previously worked with the director duo on Rabies (2010). Having been a fan of Bernard Herrmann's works and admired other classical scores released during the Classical Hollywood cinema, Ilfman, from the onset, decided to record the score with a live orchestra. While the directors refrained from using temp tracks, the basement scene has been temped with one of Hans Zimmer's score as well as Michael Kamen's score for Die Hard (1988) being used in the film. Ilfman described the music as being dark and bold, and not fully Hitchcockian score. While discussing with the directors, Ilfman cited Carter Burwell's music for the Coen brothers films and Tarantino's use of music in his films were the inspirations.

Due to the minimal use of horror elements, the music was built in a way "where it brings you to the edge, then drops completely into silence, leaving it to the sound to take over, or to use some atonal sound and let the audience imagination the rest". The film opens with a silence, and slow-motion visuals which continue for five minutes, for which he composed a "larger-than-life" musical piece in the lines of The Godfather (1972) to support the visuals and bring a dark fairy tale feel.

Ilfman wanted to separate the humor and horror so that the music would lead the comical moments, before the horror is showcased onscreen in some cues, only to be snapped by a comical remark or sound. The psychological nature of the film, dealing with the characters' state of mind also led it to be approached as scoring a thriller. Ilfman provided some variability for each character in the sequences, such as Dror's whose music had intended to let the audience guess the character until the very end, the police man character had humor in his music, the father's had a dissonant and melancholic theme "to give that sense of madness and revenge building. His father had a very bigger then life march, so those musical elements gave the audience a subtle feel to who the characters were."

== Composition ==
Ilfman recruited players from the London Metropolitan Orchestra to record the chamber ensemble of violins, basses and cellos in chronological order. The cellos were split into two sections "A" and "B", so that B would play the violas whenever needed. The winds and brass instruments were played through their three-speaker system, they arranged and again recorded for the surround and effects at different positions. The same process followed for recording the percussions, so that it provided a natural sound for the space, yet more controlled for recording pieces at close mic. The electronic instruments were compilation of the objects, such as metallic rusty sounds from old saw and violin bow played on old bike wheels which were then sampled and manipulated, so that it could be played at any register. He further used Moog synthesizers to play undertones with the orchestra. For the comical moments, he used contra bassoon and bass clarients which are naturally dark, but extremely clumsy in feel and how it was played. He used a full string section to play pizzicato and as a one-note plucking instrument, to underline the dark humor, with the woodwinds playing the melody.

Since the film is mostly set in a cellar, the music had a claustrophobic feel but as the characters venture out, it transitions into action music aided by a large orchestra ensemble. The music then progresses until the climatic moments, where the score had a bombastic feel. Ilfman recorded that some of his cues were replaced with a heavy metal rock number which had a march drumming at one point. He described it as the cue being reminiscent of Mission: Impossible theme where he was motivated to enhance the instrumentation and march drumming bigger and bigger until the climax.

== Release ==
Big Bad Wolves (Original Motion Picture Soundtrack) was released through MovieScore Media internationally with Kronos Records distributing it additionally in the United States, on 17 December 2013 in iTunes and other MP3 formats for audio streaming, while it was distributed in CDs on 28 January 2014. The album was released in vinyl LP by Death Waltz Recording Company and Mondo on 18 April 2015, coinciding with the Record Store Day.

== Reception ==
Pete Simons of Synchrotones described it as "nothing short of magnificent [...] combined with a big orchestra, a deep warm sound and a clear recording, you have yourself a very addictive little album". Jon Kitley in Kitley's Krypt wrote "having nice reoccurring theme or melody, even without the visuals of the movie, it still creates those moods in your ears and brain." Aidan Fortune of SFCrowsnest called it as a "excellently haunting soundtrack". Empire called it as "a terrifically ominous score by Haim Frank Ilfman, occasionally broken by inappropriate ringtones". Michael Gingold of Fangoria called it as a "menacing string-heavy score".

== Track listing ==
Big Bad Wolves (Original Motion Picture Soundtrack) track listing
No.	Title	Length
1.	"Main Theme"	4:15
2.	"Hide and Seek: Opening Titles"	4:09
3.	"The March"	2:00
4.	"Scream for Me"	3:16
5.	"The Chair of Horror"	2:41
6.	"The Phone Call"	1:45
7.	"The Chase"	3:15
8.	"Help Me"	2:37
9.	"Saved By the Bell"	2:45
10.	"A Story About a Little Girl"	4:15
11.	"Hammer and Bones"	1:54
12.	"Man Rides a Horse"	1:34
13.	"The Truth Will Set You Free"	2:42
14.	"The Green House"	3:52
15.	"Now Talk"	2:00
16.	"Bike vs Car"	2:36
17.	"The Last Breath"	3:48
18.	"The Missing Girl and Epilogue"	4:48
Total length:		54:12

== Release history ==
Release history and formats for Big Bad Wolves (Original Motion Picture Soundtrack)
Region	Date	Format(s)	Label	Ref.
Various	17 December 2013	Digital download; streaming	MovieScore Media	
Various	28 January 2014	CD	MovieScore Media	
Various	18 April 2015 (Record Store Day exclusive)	Vinyl	Death Waltz; Mondo	

== Accolades ==
Accolades for Big Bad Wolves (Original Motion Picture Soundtrack)
Award	Category	Result	Ref.
Fangoria Chainsaw Awards	Best Score	Nominated	
Sitges Film Festival	Special Mention	Won	
Saturn Awards	Best Music	Won	
