= Gunpowder Milkshake (soundtrack) =

Gunpowder Milkshake (Original Motion Picture Soundtrack)

Soundtrack album by Frank Ilfman
- Released: July 9, 2021
- Recorded: 2020–2021
- Genre: Film score
- Length: 72:30
- Label: Milan
- Producer: Frank Ilfman

Frank Ilfman chronology
Beti-Jai. El templo olvidado. (2021)	Gunpowder Milkshake (Original Motion Picture Soundtrack) (2021)	The Reason Why (2021)

Gunpowder Milkshake (Original Motion Picture Soundtrack) is the soundtrack to the 2021 film Gunpowder Milkshake, directed by Navot Papushado. The film score is composed by Frank Ilfman, which was released through Milan Records on July 9, 2021, five days before the United States theatrical release.

== Composition ==
In December 2019, it was reported that Frank Ilfman would compose the musical score for Gunpowder Milkshake; Ilfman previously worked with Papushado on Rabies (2010) and Big Bad Wolves (2013).

Ilfman's score to the film blends various genres as similar to the film itself; he composed a Spaghetti Western score to represent Scarlett's (Karen Gillan) character, and inspired by numerous composers such as Michel Legrand, Henry Mancini, Stelvio Cipriani, John Barry, Anton Karas, Bernard Herrmann and Nino Rota amongst others, known for composing numerous spy thriller and action films in the 1940s–60s, to bring the Western and Italian sounds. As Papushado's used to blend numerous genres, which, according to Ilfman was "quite the hard thing", the former would curate a playlist that consisted of a set of songs from various genres. This was made, so that Ilfman would provide musical ideas and thematic material inspired by the songs and the temp tracks used.

Ilfman composed signature motifs for each characters which repeat throughout the film and remain like "catchy earworms" as he intended to create cues that are similar to needle drops. Each character has been represented with a similar sound; the use of cimbalom for Scarlett was found appropriate, as citing how Barry used the instrument in the score for The Ipcress File (1965), he thought that it matched her character very well. The cue "Goonfight at Gutterball Corale" is played when Scarlett battles the Goons at the bowling alley; he wanted the music in that sequence to sound like a pop track more than an action music, but none of them matched the tone he intended. He then looked back at a particular cue he composed, which was influenced by Morricone's "The Ecstasy of Gold" from The Good, the Bad and the Ugly (1966) and thought that how the particular cue would sound like if it is performed by a full orchestra and choir. He then roped in a soprano vocalist which served as the inspiration behind the song, and found it to fit very well.

== Recording and production ==
The recording of Gunpowder Milkshake affected due to the COVID-19 pandemic as Ilfman postponed the sessions multiple times due to restrictions. His plans for assembling an indie rock band together in a studio for recording live also became unfruitful as most of them would not be allowed to put in a single room. Hence the soloists had to record the score separately. It happened very earlier, as once the team had the temp tracks of the original score, the team edited them into the test screening, and simultaneously Ilfman recorded sessions with more musicians remotely so that they could progress with the editing. After restrictions being lifted, Ilfman then recorded the orchestral portions in sections to adhere to the safety regulations. Only 50 players from the 95-piece orchestra were allowed at a time, so that the recording process went much longer, with strings for few days, and winds and so on.

== Reception ==
A review from Film Music Central summarized "You get a feel for the music rather quickly and it didn't take me a lot of time to take the measure of this film's score." Richard Whittaker of The Austin Chronicle wrote "The score from Haim Frank Ilfman definitely even channels Poliziotteschi favorite composer Franco Micalizzi, but there's a more humorous element there too, deliberately referencing his cowboy comedy Trinity in places." Christopher Garner in his review for Movie Music UK wrote "Ilfman is at the top of his game here. The wealth of leitmotifs, the fun call-backs to film music styles of yore, the huge action music—it all just combines into something fantastic."

Cassandra Clarke of Comic Book Resources described it as a "whistling score". Rob Hunter of Film School Rejects wrote "Haim Frank Ilfman's score finds some dramatic and genre-tinged sounds, but it's in service of a film that can't match it." Gissane Sophia of Marvelous Geeks Media reviewed that "It's almost like Stranger Things and The Man from U.N.C.L.E. scores had a baby". James Verniere of Boston Herald wrote "The score by Haim Frank Ilfman is designed to mimic the work of the great Ennio Morricone." John DeFore of The Hollywood Reporter wrote "the whistling spaghetti-western vibe of Frank Ilfman's score emphasized how much a fight in an under-illuminated bowling alley wanted to be a Kill Bill set piece." Robert Abele of Los Angeles Times called it as a "loudly winking Morricone-esque score".

== Track listing ==
Gunpowder Milkshake (Original Motion Picture Soundtrack) track listing
No.	Title	Artist(s)	Length
1.	"Opening Titles"		1:20
2.	"Home Sweet Home?"		0:35
3.	"Scarlet's Theme"		0:52
4.	"Gunpowder Milkshake"		1:27
5.	"Big Bad Mommy"		1:42
6.	"New Books and Clean Guns"		2:06
7.	"Dressed to Kill"		1:37
8.	"Le Bonbon"		1:43
9.	"A Careless Whisper"		1:05
10.	"The Firm"		1:31
11.	"The Rollin Roars"		2:04
12.	"Goonfight at Gutterball Corale"		2:48
13.	"The Monsters"		1:20
14.	"Rock Monster"		1:09
15.	"Yankee and the Goons"		1:23
16.	"Redemption Is for the Careless"		2:20
17.	"13:8 in 60 Seconds"		3:56
18.	"La Balada de los Charros"		2:28
19.	"Are You a Serial Killer?"		2:48
20.	"944 Bullets"		3:01
21.	"The Sam and Emily Story"		1:54
22.	"Escape Route"		3:08
23.	"Fudge You!"		2:28
24.	"Bare Knuckles and Gold Bars"		2:26
25.	"The Library Fight"		3:46
26.	"The Big Gundown"		2:32
27.	"To The Death"		3:01
28.	"Madeleine's Adagio"		3:00
29.	"McAlester's Theme"		1:47
30.	"The Standoff"		2:07
31.	"Red Dot Marks the Spot"		4:56
32.	"Sam's Theme"	Jeff Atmajian	1:43
33.	"Ensemble pour toujours"	Susana Nakatan and Les belles et le Beat	2:27
Total length:			72:30

== Accolades ==
Accolades for Gunpowder Milkshake (Original Motion Picture Soundtrack)
Award	Date of ceremony	Category	Recipient(s)	Result	Ref.
International Film Music Critics Association Awards	February 17, 2022	Best Original Score for an Action/Adventure/Thriller Film	Frank Ilfman	Nominated	
