= Mile High Horror Film Festival =

Film festival in Colorado

- Location: Denver, Colorado, USA
- Founded: 2010
- Language: International
- Website: mhhff.com

The Mile High Horror Film Festival was a film festival that took place in the Denver metro area of Colorado from 2010-2015. It had a brief return as an online festival in 2020 and 2021. The festival showcased horror, thriller, and sci-fi films from around the world, while hosting celebrities, artists, and filmmakers from thecite horror genre.

== History ==
The Mile High Horror Film Festival was founded in 2010 and was the oldest running genre film festival in Denver, Colorado.

It was recognized as one of the 'Top 5 Coolest Horror/Sci-Fi Film Festivals in the World' by MovieMaker Magazine.

The festival was founded by Timothy Schultz and Theresa Likarish. Both avid genre film fans, they regularly attended film festivals across the US before deciding to create the Mile High Horror Film Festival. They wanted to create a festival that didn't exist in Colorado, which they themselves would like to attend. Schultz is a filmmaker himself and gained inspiration from having his own films played around the world in festivals prior to starting this festival.

In 2013, the festival launched a compilation of short horror films titled, the Mile High Horror Shorts package, which is available on demand and in select cable networks.

The Mile High Horror Film Festival has multiple prizes for films, screenplays, and music videos. Prizes include custom built trophies along with publicity and prizes awarded by the festival's sponsors.

== Special Guests and Honorees ==
2015

A few of the 2015 special guests included:

Jack Black, Dylan Minnette, Odeya Rush, and Ryan Lee for the Colorado premiere of Goosebumps (film)

Tobin Bell from the Saw (franchise)

Lisa & Louise Burns + Joe Turkel from The Shining (film)

Sid Haig from The Devil's Rejects and House of 1000 Corpses

Neil Marshall from The Descent, Tales of Halloween, and Dog Soldiers

Adam Green - Director of the Hatchet film series

Linnea Quigley for the 30th anniversary of The Return of the Living Dead presented by Fangoria

Greg MacLennan from Drafthouse Films

Nate Bolotin from XYZ Films

Heather Langenkamp via Skype for a Wes Craven Memoriam screening of A Nightmare on Elm Street

Bailey Jay via Skype for a LGBT in Horror Panel

Ron Chaney for a special 90th anniversary of The Phantom of the Opera (1925 film) w/ live musical score by Paul Buscarello.

2014

The 2014 MHHFF welcomed many horror icons, actors, and filmmakers, some of which included:

Tony Todd from the Candyman (film) series.

Gunnar Hansen, known for his role as Leatherface, for a special 40th anniversary screening of The Texas Chain Saw Massacre.

Scream queen Julie Adams attended a special 60th anniversary presentation of Creature from the Black Lagoon in 3D.

Directors Daniel Myrick, Eduardo Sánchez, and producer Gregg Hale attended a special 15-year anniversary of The Blair Witch Project. Mr. Sanchez and Hale were also in person for a special presentation of their feature film, Exists (film).

Michael Berryman from The Hills Have Eyes, The Devil's Rejects, and One Flew Over the Cuckoo's Nest (film) was also in attendance, among many other guests.

2013

In 2013, the Mile High Horror Film Festival hosted top-notch talent from the horror genre.

The festival presented a Lifetime Achievement Award to actor and legendary special effects makeup artist, Mr. Tom Savini for his outstanding contributions to horror film.

For the festival's opening night, film director Jim Mickle appeared for an advanced screening of his film, We Are What We Are (2013) before its theatrical release later that year.

Linda Blair was also in attendance on the opening night for a special 40th anniversary presentation of The Exorcist (1973).

Actor Doug Bradley, who stars as Pinhead from the Hellraiser series was in attendance for an interview before a rare exhibition of Hellraiser on the big screen.

Actors Ken Foree and Tom Savini both attended a special 35th anniversary presentation of George A. Romero's Dawn of the Dead (1978).

For the closing night ceremony on Sunday, October 6, "Rowdy" Roddy Piper and Meg Foster participated in a Q&A discussion with the audience before a sold out 25th anniversary presentation of John Carpenter's film, They Live.

The festival's 2013 guest judges included the writer and creator of the Final Destination series, Mr. Jeffrey Reddick and the writer and director of The Blair Witch Project, Mr. Dan Myrick.

Other notable guests in attendance included scream queen Tiffany Shepis, Jonathan Tiersten, Timothy Quill, and side-show performer, The Enigma (performer).

2012

In 2012, the Mile High Horror Film Festival hosted a wide array of celebrities including actor Corey Feldman to commemorate the 25th anniversary of The Lost Boys.

The festival's 2012 guest judges included the writer and creator of the Final Destination series, Mr. Jeffrey Reddick and the writer and director of The Blair Witch Project, Mr. Dan Myrick.

Actors Kane Hodder and Bill Moseley participated in the 2012 MHHFF Monster Panel discussion before being presented with Mile High Horror Film Festival Slasher Awards for outstanding achievement in the horror genre.

Other notable guests included actress Eileen Dietz who played the demon from "The Exorcist," Jonathan Tiersten from Sleepaway Camp, and horror author Richard Kadrey.

2011

In 2011, the Mile High Horror Film Festival honored actor Michael Berryman with a Lifetime Achievement Award for Excellence in the Horror Genre after hosting a special presentation of the original The Hills Have Eyes (1977), directed by Wes Craven.

Festival guest judges included the writer and creator of the Final Destination series, Mr. Jeffrey Reddick and the writer and director of The Blair Witch Project, Mr. Dan Myrick.

Film directors Tim Sullivan and Adam Rifkin were present for the Colorado debut of their horror anthology film, Chillerama. Actor Zach Rand was also in person for his role in Lucky McKee's The Woman, which made its Colorado debut at the 2011 MHHFF.

== Festival Award-winning Films ==
Mile High Horror Film Festival awards can vary from year to year and have included the following categories:

- Best Feature Film
- Audience Award for Best Feature Film
- Best Actor in a Feature Length Film
- Best Short Film
- Audience Award for Best Short Film
- Best Local Colorado Short Film
- Best Animation
- Best Sci-fi Short Film
- Most Innovative Short Film
- Best Shock Factor
- Mile High Gore Award
- Best Feature Screenplay
- Best Short Screenplay
- Best Music Video

== Past winners ==
=== 2021 ===
- Best Feature Film: Alone With You directed by Emily Bennett and Justin Brooks
- Audience Award for Best Feature Film: Sweetie, You Won't Believe It directed by Yernar Nurgaliyev
- Best Short Film: The Last Marriage directed by Johan Tappert and Gustav Egerstedt
- Audience Award for Best Short Film: Last Chance directed by Anthony Fanelli
- Best Animation: Death and the Winemaker directed by Victor Jaquier
- Best Sci-fi Short Film: Venus directed by Andrew McGee
- Best Feature Screenplay: The Extreme Weight Loss Program written by Dana Hammer
- Best Short Screenplay: Monster written by Chris Choate
- Best Short Screenplay: Your Virtual Assistant written by Suhas Sridhar and Nicholas Barragan

=== 2020 ===
- Best Feature Film: Slaxx directed by Elza Kephart
- Audience Award for Best Feature Film: The Cleansing Hour directed by Damien Lemick
- Best Short Film: Laura Hasn't Slept directed by Parker Finn
- Audience Award for Best Short Film: Monsters directed by Steve Desmond
- Best Animation: Farce directed by Robin Jensen
- Best Colorado Short Film: Schizo directed by Joey Partridge
- Creative Colorado Competition Winner: Slices by Jerrod D. Britto
- Best Feature Screenplay: Soul Passage written by Patrick Mediate and Kristin Llagan
- Best Short Screenplay: Wet Rot written by Stuart Creque

=== 2015 ===
- Best Feature Film: Night Fare directed by Julien Seri
- Audience Award for Best Feature Film: The Final Girls directed by Todd Strauss-Schulson
- Crypt TV Best Short Film: The House is Innocent directed by Nicholas Coles
- Crypt TV Audience Award for Best Short Film: Slut directed by Chloe Okuno
- Best Sci-Fi Short Film: Helio directed by Teddy Cecil
- Best Colorado Short Film: Iris directed by Richard Karpala
- Creative Colorado Competition Winner: Pills by James McLaughlin
- Creative Colorado Competition Finalist: Crazy Love directed by D.M. Slate
- Mile High Horror Slasher Award Honorees: Tobin Bell, Sid Haig
- Posthumous Lifetime Achievement Award Honorees: Lon Chaney Sr. and Lon Chaney Jr. These awards were accepted by Ron Chaney

Final Draft Best Short Screenplay Competition:

- 1) Dead Sprint by Jason Tostevin
- 2) Voudon by Stuart Creque
- 3) Ye Merry Gentlemen by Andrew Wassom

Final Draft Best Feature Screenplay Competition:

- 1) Hominid by Joe Toplyn
- 2) Hurricane Party by Ned Farr
- 3) The Rising by Jeremy McCann + SE 3D by Joshua Cohen

=== 2014 ===
- Best Feature Film: Housebound directed by Gerard Johnstone
- Audience Award for Best Feature Film: Dead Snow: Red vs. Dead directed by Tommy Wirkola
- Best Short Film: The Banishing directed by Erlingur Thoroddsen
- Audience Award for Best Short Film: Dog Food directed by Brian Cranno
- Best Colorado Short Film: M directed by Travis Lupher
- Creative Colorado Competition Winner: The High Cost of Easy Living by Greg Palmer
- Creative Colorado Competition Finalists: Unsee directed by Larisa Myers and "Don't Play With Your Dinner" directed by D.M. Slate

Critics' Award Feature Screenplays:

- 1) The Broken by Jeremy McCann
- 2) Bruja by Margaret McCarley
- 3) Rue by Kay Poiro

Critics' Award Short Screenplays:

- 1) Hard R by Eric Jaffe
- 2) Hannah by David Beran
- 3) The Black Raven by Tracey Maye

=== 2013 ===
- Audience Award for Best Feature Film: Cheap Thrills (film) directed by E.L. Katz
- Audience Award for Best Feature Film: Big Bad Wolves directed by Aharon Keshales and Navot Papushado
- Best Feature Film: The Seasoning House directed by Paul Hyett
- Best Short Film: Vienna Waits for You directed by Dominik Hartl
- Audience Award for Best Short Film: Killer Kart directed by James Feeney
- Audience Award for Best Short Film: Gillespie directed by John Gibson
- Best Music Video: Don't Be Afraid, It's Only Death by The Widow's Bane
- Creative Colorado Competition Winner: Killer Board directed by Marisa Laus
- Best Song: "Satori-C Sad Living in the City feat Time for Trees" by Colin E. Chapman

Critics' Award Feature Screenplays:

- 1) Lockdown by Jeremy McCann
- 2) Ship of the Dead by Robert Kois
- 3) The Man Who Killed Sandra Wallace by Anders Nelson

Critics' Award Short Screenplays:

- 1) Memento Mori by Stuart Creque
- 2) Foggy Intentions by Danielle Smith
- 3) New York Lobby, 3:00 A.M.

=== 2012 ===
- Best Feature Film: Citadel directed by Ciaran Foy
- Audience Award for Best Feature Film: Nightmare Factory directed by Donna Davies
- Best Actor in a Leading Role: Eddie McGee for The Human Race
- Best Short Film: Psycho Therapy directed by Lucas Cody Garcia
- Audience Award for Best Short Film: Paralyzed directed by Aaron Sims
- Best Animation: Bobby Yeah directed by Robert Morgan
- Best Colorado Short Film: Deadbox directed by Richard Karpala

=== 2011 ===
- Best Feature Film: Rabies directed by Navot Papushado & Aharon Keshales
- Audience Award for Best Feature Film: Midnight Son directed by Scott Leberecht
- Best Short Film: The Living Want Me Dead directed by Bill Palmer
- Audience Award for Best Short Film : The Legend of Beaver Dam directed by Jerome Sable
- Best Animation :Nursery Crimes directed by L. Whyte
- Most Innovative Short Film: Follow the Sun directed by Teddy Dibble
- Best Colorado Short Film: Incubator directed by Jimmy Weber

=== 2010 ===
- Best Feature Film: Rammbock directed by Marvin Kren
- Audience Award for Best Feature Film: True Nature directed by Patrick Steele
- Best Short Film: Love Me Tender directed by Mathew Morgenthaler
- Audience Award for Best Short Film: The Familiar directed by Kody Zimmerman
- Best Shock Factor: La Petite Mort directed by Jan Gallasch
- Mile High Gore Award: Axed directed by Joshua Long
- Best Animation: White Room directed by Chris Chitaroni

== See also ==
- List of fantastic and horror film festivals
