= 2015 Fangoria Chainsaw Awards =

Annual US horror film awards ceremony

22nd Fangoria Chainsaw Awards
- Presented by: Fangoria
- Presented on: 2015
- Site: Los Angeles, California

Highlights
- Most awards: The Babadook (4)
- Most nominations: The Babadook, Big Bad Wolves and Oculus (4)

The 2015 Fangoria Chainsaw Awards, presented by Fangoria magazine and Creation Entertainment, honored the best horror films of 2014.

== Winners and nominees ==
Best Wide Release	Best Limited Release
Oculus − Directed by Mike Flanagan; As Above, So Below − Directed by John Erick Dowdle; Dracula Untold − Directed by Gary Shore; Godzilla − Directed by Gareth Edwards; The Quiet Ones − Directed by John Pogue	The Babadook − Directed by Jennifer Kent; Housebound − Directed by Gerard Johnstone; The Battery − Directed by Jeremy Gardner; The Sacrament − Directed by Ti West; Under the Skin − Directed by Jonathan Glazer
Best Actor	Best Actress
Daniel Radcliffe − Horns as Ignatius "Ig" Perrish; Jake Gyllenhaal − Enemy as Adam Bell and Anthony Claire; Jared Harris − The Quiet Ones as Professor Joseph Coupland; Lior Ashkenazi − Big Bad Wolves as Micki; Nick Damici − Late Phases as Ambrose McKinley	Essie Davis − The Babadook as Amelia Vanek; Alex Essoe − Starry Eyes as Sarah Walker; Marta Milans − Devoured as Lourdes; Scarlett Johansson − Under the Skin as the Female; Tilda Swinton − Only Lovers Left Alive as Eve
Best Supporting Actor	Best Supporting Actress
Noah Wiseman − The Babadook as Samuel Vanek; David Asavanond − Countdown as Jesus; Gene Jones − The Sacrament as Father; Michael Parks − Tusk as Howard Howe; Tzahi Grad − Big Bad Wolves as Gidi	Katee Sackhoff − Oculus as Kaylie Russell; Anne Ramsay − The Taking of Deborah Logan as Sarah Logan; Mia Wasikowska − Only Lovers Left Alive as Ava; Olivia Cooke − The Quiet Ones as Jane Harper / Evey Dwyer; Rima Te Wiata − Housebound as Miriam Bucknell
Best Screenplay	Best Score
The Babadook − Jennifer Kent; Housebound − Gerard Johnstone; Life After Beth − Jeff Baena; Oculus − Mike Flanagan and Jeff Howard; Proxy − Zack Parker and Kevin Donner	Under the Skin − Mica Levi; Big Bad Wolves − Haim Frank Ilfman; Oculus − The Newton Brothers; Only Lovers Left Alive − Jozef van Wissem; Starry Eyes − Jonathan Snipes
Best Make-Up/Creature FX	Best International Film
Horns − Greg Nicotero and Howard Berger; Afflicted − Tamar Ouziel; Dead Snow 2: Red vs. Dead − Steinar Kaarstein and Mike Elizalde; Late Phases − Robert Kurtzman and Brian Spears; Starry Eyes − Hugo Villasenor and S.O.T.A. FX	Big Bad Wolves − Directed by Aharon Keshales and Navot Papushado (Israel); A Girl Walks Home Alone at Night − Directed by Ana Lily Amirpour (Iran); The House at the End of Time − Directed by Alejandro Hidalgo (Venezuela); The Strange Colour of Your Body's Tears − Directed by Hélène Cattet and Bruno Forzani (Belgium); Witching & Bitching − Directed by Álex de la Iglesia (Spain)
Worst Film
Ouija − Directed by Stiles White; Annabelle − Directed by John R. Leonetti; Leprechaun: Origins − Directed by Zach Lipovsky; Oculus − Directed by Mike Flanagan; Tusk − Directed by Kevin Smith
Best TV Series	Best TV Make-Up/Creature FX
The Walking Dead (AMC); American Horror Story: Freak Show (FX); Hannibal (NBC); Penny Dreadful (Showtime); True Detective (HBO)	The Walking Dead − Greg Nicotero and Howard Berger; Hannibal − François Dagenais; Penny Dreadful − Nick Dudman; The Strain − Steve Newburn and Sean Sansom; True Detective − Todd Masters and Dan Rebert
Best TV Actor	Best TV Actress
Matthew McConaughey − True Detective as Detective Rustin "Rust" Cohle; Andrew Lincoln − The Walking Dead as Rick Grimes; Hugh Dancy − Hannibal as Will Graham; Josh Hartnett − Penny Dreadful as Ethan Chandler; Mads Mikkelsen − Hannibal as Dr. Hannibal Lecter	Sarah Paulson − American Horror Story: Freak Show as Bette and Dot Tattler; Anna Paquin − True Blood as Sookie Stackhouse; Eva Green − Penny Dreadful as Vanessa Ives; Janet Montgomery − Salem as Mary Walcott / Mary Sibley; Nicole Beharie − Sleepy Hollow as Abbie Mills
Best TV Supporting Actor	Best TV Supporting Actress
Norman Reedus − The Walking Dead as Daryl Dixon; David Bradley − The Strain as Professor Abraham Setrakian; Finn Wittrock − American Horror Story: Freak Show as Dandy Mott; Rory Kinnear − Penny Dreadful as the Creature; Zane Holtz − From Dusk till Dawn: The Series as Richie Gecko	Gillian Anderson − Hannibal as Dr. Bedelia Du Maurier; Billie Piper − Penny Dreadful as Brona Croft / Lily Frankenstein; Deborah Ann Woll − True Blood as Jessica Hamby; Madeleine Martin − Hemlock Grove as Shelley Godfrey; Melissa McBride − The Walking Dead as Carol Peletier

== Fangoria Horror Hall of Fame ==
- Ti West
- Robert Rodriguez
