= Hannah New =

British actress (born 1984)

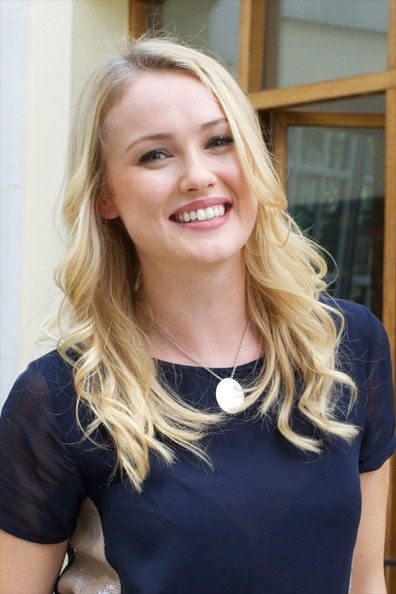
- New in 2013
- Born: 13 May 1984 (age 42); Balham, London, England
- Education: Royal Central School of Speech and Drama
- Occupations: Actress; model
- Years active: 2003–present

Hannah New (born 13 May 1984) is a British actress and model. She is best known for her roles as Lady Tilly Arnold on Bridgerton, Eleanor Guthrie on the television show Black Sails and Rosalinda Fox in The Time in Between.

== Early life ==
Hannah New was born in Balham, London, and is the youngest of three sisters. At the age of four, she attended a ballet school. She later joined the National Youth Theatre. Her interest in other cultures led her to visit over 20 countries including spending 3 months in a children's home in Bolivia in 2003.

New studied in University of Leeds where she learned Spanish, she also studied abroad in Spain and was spotted by a talent scout in Barcelona, and then studied a postgraduate degree at the Royal Central School of Speech and Drama.

== Career ==
New's career was launched by American talent manager Stacey Castro, who discovered her in Barcelona, Spain in 2009, during a search for UK casting director Susie Figgis to find the role of "Lucrezia Borgia" for the television series The Borgias. In 2010, she was offered a role in television show The Time in Between, the adaptation of the same-titled María Dueñas novel. She played Rosalinda Fox, a young English woman who is the lover of Juan Luis Beigbeder and friend of Sira Quiroga. In 2011, she landed a lead role in "Shelter", an unaired television pilot. New featured in a Spanish movie playing alongside David Hasselhoff in the film Brain Dead 2 in 2011.

New was managed by Castro until 2012, the year she joined the cast of the Starz TV show Black Sails. She plays Eleanor Guthrie, the daughter of Richard Guthrie, a saloon owner who runs her father's illegal businesses in Nassau. The 8-episode first season premièred on 25 January 2014, and in 2014 she was filming the second season in South Africa. New featured in all four seasons of the show which was televised until 2017. As well as acting, New found time to climb Mount Kilimanjaro for the Intyatyambo Community Project charity in 2015, and also taught English to school children in Khayelitsha during her time off from filming the TV series Black Sails.

New played Queen Leila, Princess Aurora's mother, in the Disney film Maleficent, which was released on 30 May 2014.

In 2014, New got a main role in the true-based thriller Under the Bed, in which a young woman tries to get over a recent romantic breakup while a stalker befriends her on social media and takes up residence underneath her bed. The film was released in 2017.

During 2019, New played Elizabeth Crookshank in the film Edge of the World for its 2021 release.

== Filmography ==
=== Film ===
Year	Title	Role	Notes
2011	ReVersion	Liv	Short film
2011	Super Mario	Louise	Short film
2011	Fuga de cerebros 2	Nancy	
2014	Maleficent	Queen Leila	
2021	Edge of the World	Elizabeth Crookshank	
2022	Summit Fever	Natascha	
2023	Trauma Therapy: Psychosis	Elizabeth	
2025	Mr Burton	Daphne Rye	
2026	Flavia	Harriet De Luce	

=== Television ===
Year	Title	Role	Notes
2010	La Riera	Julie	1 episode
2010	El club del chiste	Caitlin	1 episode
2012	Shelter	Kathryn Gilchrist	TV movie
2012	El barco	Úrsula	1 episode
2013−2014	The Time in Between	Rosalinda Fox	Main cast
2014−2017	Black Sails	Eleanor Guthrie	Main cast
2017	Under the Bed	Callie Monroe	TV movie
2017	The Strain	Louisa	Recurring cast
2018	Trust	Victoria Holdsworth	Recurring cast
2024	Bridgerton	Lady Tilley Arnold	Season 3
