= Lobo feroz =

- Theatrical release poster
- Directed by: Gustavo Hernández Ibañez
- Screenplay by: Juma Fodde; Conchi del Río
- Based on: Big Bad Wolves by Aharon Keshales and Navot Papushado
- Starring: Adriana Ugarte; Javier Gutiérrez; Rubén Ochandiano; Juana Acosta; Antonio Dechent; Manuel Vega; Fernando Tejero
- Production companies: Bowfinger International Pictures; Lobo Feroz AIE; Mother Superior; Esto También Pasará; Basque Films; FilmSharks
- Distributed by: Filmax
- Release date: 27 January 2023 (Spain)
- Countries: Spain; Uruguay
- Language: Spanish

Lobo feroz (transl. Ferocious Wolf) is a 2023 Spanish-Uruguayan crime thriller film directed by Gustavo Hernández Ibañez remaking the 2013 film Big Bad Wolves. It stars Javier Gutiérrez, Adriana Ugarte, and Rubén Ochandiano alongside Juana Acosta, Manu Vega, Antonio Dechent, and Fernando Tejero.

== Plot ==
A woman eager for revenge crosses paths with a police agent while searching for a killer of girls.

== Cast ==
- Adriana Ugarte as Matilde
- Javier Gutiérrez as Alonso
- Rubén Ochandiano as Elias
- Juana Acosta as Vidal
- Antonio Dechent as Romero
- Manuel Vega as Álex
- Fernando Tejero as Hipólito
- María Alfonsa Rosso as Madre Alonso
- José Chaves as Gutiérrez
- Luna Fulgencio as Matilde niña

== Production ==
Adapted by Juma Fodde and Conchi del Río, the screenplay is a remake of 2013 Israeli film Big Bad Wolves's. The film was produced by Bowfinger International Pictures, and Lobo Feroz AIE alongside Mother Superior, Esto También Pasará, Basque Films and FilmSharks with the participation of Netflix, and support from ICAA. It was fully shot in the province of Cádiz in February 2021 (including locations such as Vejer, El Puerto, or Chiclana), with San Fernando as home base.

== Release ==
Distributed by Filmax, the film was theatrically released in Spain on 27 January 2023.

== Reception ==
Javier Ocaña of El País assessed that the film incorporates vulgar dialogue and "laughable sequences that look like something out of a bad Guy Ritchie movie", otherwise featuring such a degree of gratuitous violence that it ends up being "torture porn without quality".

Sergio F. Pinilla of Cinemanía rated the film 3 out of 5 stars, considering that it "entertains, but pales in comparison to the original film".

== See also ==
- List of Spanish films of 2023
