= Circusland =

Spanish museum dedicated to the history of circus arts

- Palau Internacional de les Arts del Circ
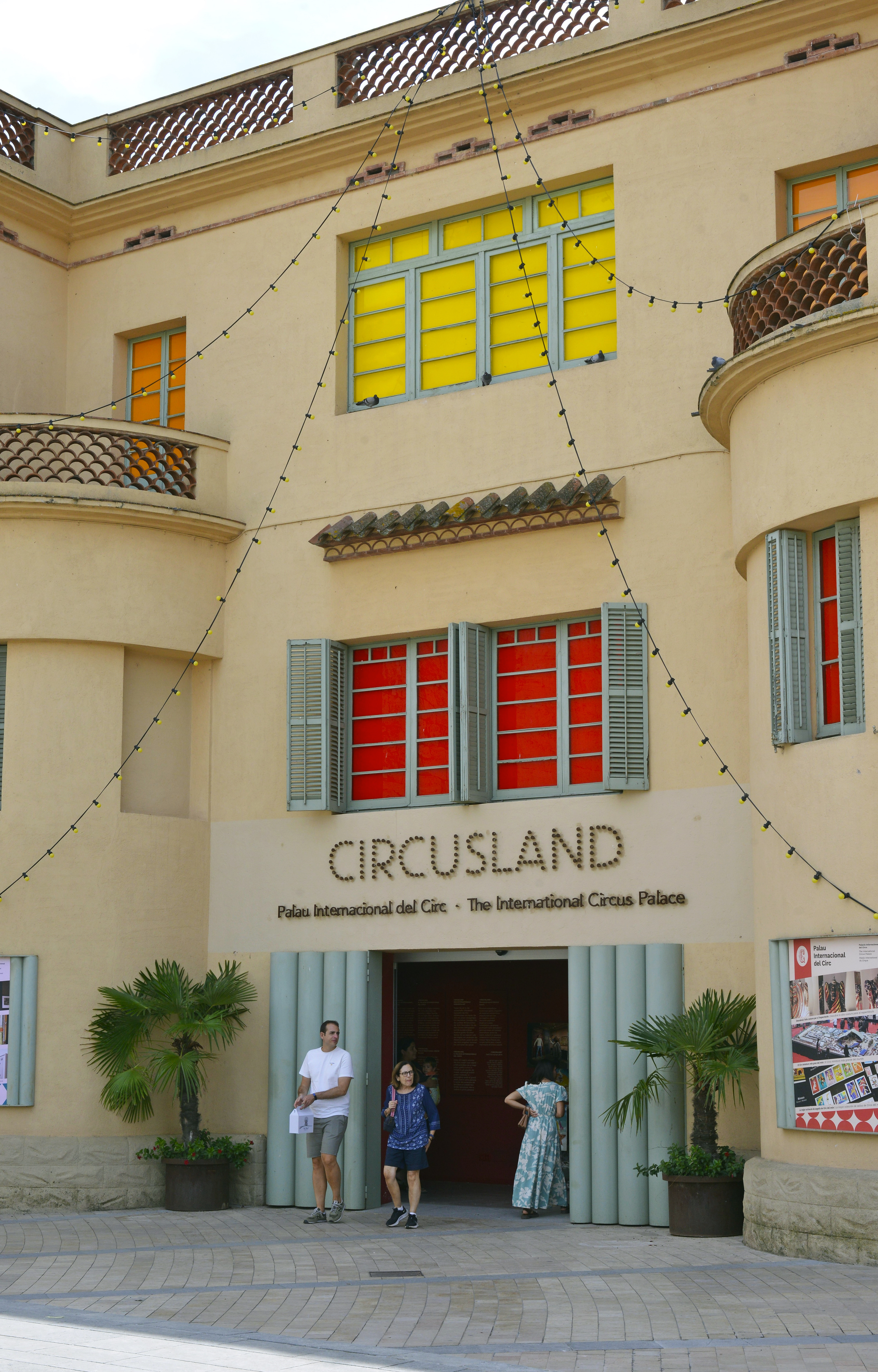
- Established: December 18, 2020
- Location: Besalú, Girona, Spain
- Type: Circus museum
- Founder: Circus Art Foundation
- Director: Genís Matabosch Giménez
- Website: circusland.org/en/inicial-3/

Circusland, also known as the International Palace of Circus Arts (in Catalan, Palau Internacional de les Arts del Circ), is a museum dedicated to the world of circus, located in Besalú, Catalonia (Spain). It was opened the 18th of December 2020. It is housed within the Cal Coro building (built in 1945), where the abbey house of Besalú's Sant Pere monastery originally was.

It is Europe's only patrimonial institution dedicated to circus history and tradition. Its goal is to gather, preserve, research, showcase and promote the cultural heritage of the circus.

Along with the Golden Elephant International Circus Festival, it is one of the main initiatives promoted by the Circus Art Foundation, a Spanish private cultural foundation directed by Genís Matabosch, a circus historian and producer. The foundation's goal is to promote, disseminate, protect and give prestige to the circus arts as leisure, a performing art, an integral part of culture and a paradigm of multiculturalism.

== Collection ==
The Circus Art Foundation possesses one of the world's biggest collections related to the world of circus, owning several thousand pieces. Of these, 537 are currently exhibited at Circusland.

They are distributed in a space of 1,500 square meters, in three floors and a total of twelve rooms. They are set in the form of a journey through circus history by exploring its different disciplines.

The collection includes:

- A multilingual library with over 4,000 circus-themed works.
- The world's biggest miniature circus maquette (measuring 50 m2) which represents Germany's Circus Gleich on a 1:25 scale. Among its figurines, it has 420 characters, 270 animals, 170 vehicles and several tents. It was created by Dutch engineer V. Herwerden over a 40-year period of time.
- Famous circus artists' costumes, apparatus and memorabilia. Among them, Pinito del Oro's Washington trapeze and the 27 white clown spangled costumes by the former Maison Vicaire, a prestigious parisian fashion atelier, stand out.
- The world's biggest circus-themed philatelic collection (with over 900 stamps from 115 countries).
- The photographic archives donated by Álvaro Castellano Villar's (Madrid's Circo Price's former official photographer), Josep Vinyes and Alberto Oller, with more than 40.000 photographs dating from 1940 to 1970.
- The lithographer César Fernández-Ardavín's poster archive, dating from the beginning of the 20th century.

== Funding ==
The first stage of the project was 1.7 million euros, and was funded with the financial support of the Generalitat de Catalunya (which invested 750,000 euros over the course of four years) and Girona's provincial delegation (which invested 500,000 euros between 2020 and 2021).

== See also ==
- International Circus Hall of Fame
- Circus World Museum
