= Love on a Tightrope =

- Theatrical release poster
- Spanish: Tal vez
- Directed by: Arima León
- Written by: Arima León
- Produced by: Silvia Carvalho
- Starring: Adriana Ugarte; Tania Santana; Mari Carmen Sánchez; Nieves Bravo; Aitor Luna; Lea Marks; Antonia San Juan; Maykol Hernández; Andrea Zoghbi; Ruth Sánchez; Luifer Rodríguez; María Sabaté; Mara Reina; Toni Báez; Salva Reina; María Isabel Díaz
- Cinematography: Carolina Maltese
- Edited by: Lucía Casal
- Music by: Celia Rivero
- Production companies: Inefable Productions; Tal vez la película
- Distributed by: Deep Com Roots
- Release dates: 24 April 2026 (FICLPGC); 10 July 2026 (Spain)
- Running time: 115 minutes
- Country: Spain
- Language: Spanish

Love on a Tightrope (Spanish: Tal vez, lit. 'perhaps') is a 2026 drama film written and directed by Arima León (in her directorial debut feature). It stars Adriana Ugarte and Tania Santana as, respectively, Pinito del Oro and Natalia Sosa Ayala.

== Plot ==
Set in 1968 against the backdrop of Francoist repression and the silencing of sexual dissent, the plot explores the romance between famous trapeze artist Pinito del Oro and Canarian poet Natalia Sosa Ayala, when Pinito, about to finish her circus career, proposes Sosa to write her memoirs, paving the way for a passionate connection between the two women.

== Cast ==
- Adriana Ugarte as Pinito del Oro
- Tania Santana as Natalia Sosa Ayala
- Antonia San Juan as Peregrina
- Luifer Rodríguez as Juan Sosa
- Salva Reina as Manuel
- Maykol Hernández as Plácido Fleitas

== Production ==
The inception of the project traces back to the preparation of Arima León's PhD dissertation on film representation of sexuality between women. Prior to the start of filming Marta Viera and Tania Santana were cast for the leading roles. Later in the production stage, Marta Viera dropped off and Adriana Ugarte step in her place. Ugarte worked on her Canarian accent to prepare for the role, including s-aspirations, and watched audiovisual footage from the trapeze artist hosted in the archives of Filmoteca Canaria. Shooting locations in Gran Canaria included Teror and Ciudad Jardín.

== Release ==
The film was presented in the 'Canarian Cinema' section of the 25th Las Palmas de Gran Canaria International Film Festival. Distributed by Deep Com Roots, it is scheduled to be released theatrically in Spain on 10 July 2026.

== Reception ==
Miguel Ángel Romero of Cinemanía rated Love on a Tightrope 3½ out of 5 stars, describing it as "a slow-paced film, yet brimming with passion, delicacy, and female empowerment".

Javier Ocaña of El País lamented that "everything is so explicit, so discursive, even in the most everyday conversations" "that the film never really takes off".

== See also ==
- List of Spanish films of 2026
