= The Widow's Bane =

American rock band

- The Widow's Bane album cover

Background information
- Origin: Boulder, Colorado, United States
- Genres: Folk punk, sea shanty, gothic rock, klezmer, roots revival, murder ballad, vaudeville, cabaret
- Years active: 2008–present
- Label: Rusty Road
- Members: Mortimer Leech, Rutherford Belleview, Rictus Corpum, Franklin McKane, Bat Catacombs, Madame Reaper, Jimson Crockett, Abracham Lynch
- Website: Official website

The Widow's Bane is an American band from Boulder, Colorado whose music incorporates elements of roots revival, sea shanties, klezmer, vaudeville, gothic rock, and murder ballads while evoking the comedic cabaret styles of Tom Waits and Nick Cave. The band defines their genre as Zombie-Death-Polka. Its line-up includes frontman Gov. Mortimer Leech (a.k.a. Clay Rose), Rutherford Belleview, Rictus Corpum, Franklin McKane, and Bat Catacombs. Previous band members were Jimson Crockett, Abraham Lynch, Frank Raven, James Calvin Thompson, and Philip Parker. Their live show is characterized by zombie-style makeup, Great Depression-era costumes, the creepy animatronic movements of lead singer Leech, and dancing by self-styled "snake-charming hussy," Madame Reaper.

In 2018, The Widow's Bane wrote and performed the score, for a production of Wicked Bayou, with Denver based Wonderbound ballet company.

== Awards ==
2013 - Best Music Video - Mile High Horror Film Festival

== Press ==
You've never heard 'zombie death polka' quite like the Widow's Bane does it
An interview with Rutherford Belleview
Zombies are just undead gentlemen: An interview with The Widow's Bane
Widow’s Bane: Roots music from the undead
Mortimer Leech Raises Hell for Wonderbound's Wicked Bayou
Widow’s Bane – The Afterlife Is A Never-Ending Party
KCSU Music: Live In-Studio Session with Clay Rose of Gasoline Lollipops and Widow’s Bane
Part 1: Zombie Death Polka
Part 2: Mortimer Leech, Age Unknown
Part 3: The Story Behind The Song
The Widow’s Bane find the sacred in the profane
Mortimer Leech & The Widow’s Bane: A New Lease on Death
Mortimer Leech of The Widow's Bane confronts his eternal past
The Widow’s Bane Brings Music From Wonderbound Collaboration To CPR’s OpenAir
Widow's Bane: The rocking dead

== Discography ==
- The Widow's Bane (2009)
- Don't be Afraid; It's Only Death (June 6, 2013)
