= Clay Rose =

American visual artist and musician

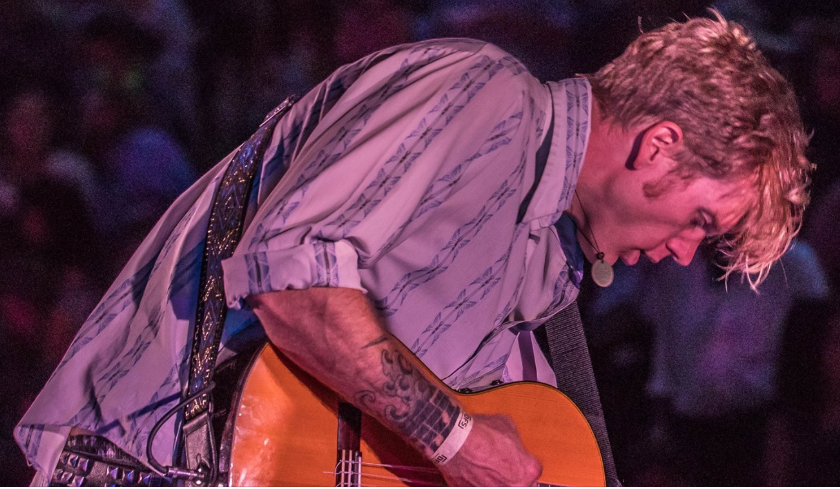
- Rose in 2019

Background information
- Genres: Folk, rockabilly
- Occupation: Musician
- Instruments: Vocals, guitar
- Website: gasolinelollipops.com

Clay Rose (born in Lafayette, Colorado, United States) is an American visual artist, singer, songwriter, and rhythm guitarist. Rose attended high school in Tennessee and moved to Colorado at the age of 22.

Rose is the front-man for Gasoline Lollipops. Rose and Gasoline Lollipops were featured in the Westword Music Showcase in 2017. Gasoline Lollipops have played at Colorado venues, including Red Rocks, Bluebird Theater, Aggie Theater (Fort Collins, CO), and Fox Theater.

Rose also writes and plays under his alter ego, Governor Mortimer Leech, front-man of The Widow's Bane. The Widow's Bane was voted "Best Secret Identity Band (2016)".

== Discography ==
=== Gasoline Lollipops ===
- Dawn (May 2, 2013)
- Death (October 31, 2014)
- "Resurrection" (February 14, 2017)
- "Soul Mine" (December 26, 2017)
- "All The Misery Money Can Buy" (September 11, 2020)
- "Nightmares" (October 14, 2022)

=== The Widow's Bane ===
- The Widow's Bane (2009)
- Don't be Afraid; It's Only Death (June 6, 2013)

=== Clay Rose ===
- Smoke and Steam (July 7, 2005)
- Suck on This! EP (March 17, 2006)
