= The Opposite of Love =

- Theatrical release poster
- Spanish: Lo contrario al amor
- Directed by: Vicente Villanueva
- Written by: Vicente Villanueva
- Produced by: Francisco Ramos; Mercedes Gamero
- Starring: Hugo Silva; Adriana Ugarte; Alex Barahona; Rubén Sanz; Guadalupe Lancho; Luis Callejo; Kiti Manver
- Cinematography: David Carretero
- Edited by: Teresa Font
- Music by: Julio de la Rosa
- Production companies: Zeta Cinema; A3 Films
- Distributed by: Sony Pictures Releasing de España
- Release dates: 25 August 2011 (Cine Callao); 26 August 2011 (Spain)
- Country: Spain
- Language: Spanish

The Opposite of Love (Spanish: Lo contrario al amor) is a 2011 Spanish romantic comedy film written and directed by Vicente Villanueva (in his directorial debut feature) which stars Hugo Silva and Adriana Ugarte.

== Plot ==
The plot tracks the ups and downs in the relationship between firefighter Raúl and massage therapist Merce upon their meeting by chance.

== Cast ==
- Hugo Silva as Raúl
- Adriana Ugarte as Merce
- Luis Callejo as Fidel
- Álex Barahona as Toño
- Guadalupe Lancho as Loreto
- Rubén Sanz as Salva
- Kiti Manver as María Amparo

== Production ==
The film is a Zeta Cinema (Francisco Ramos) and A3 Films (Mercedes Gamero) production. Shooting locations included Madrid.

== Release ==
The film received a pre-screening at Cine Callao in Madrid on 25 August 2011. Distributed by Sony Pictures Releasing de España, it was released theatrically in Spain on 26 August 2011.

== Reception ==
Jordi Batlle Caminal of Fotogramas rated the film 3 out of 5 stars, highlighting Lancho's supporting performance as the best thing about the film while negatively assessing the excessively "schematic" plot development.

Javier Ocaña of El País deemed the film to be a "romantic comedy that is much more subtle than its promotional poster implies" but also pointed out that it falls apart in its last third due to moralizing intentions and narrative cowardice.

== See also ==
- List of Spanish films of 2011
