= The Time in Between (TV series) =

Spanish period drama television series

- El tiempo entre costuras
- Genre: Period drama; Serial drama; Romantic drama; Spy drama
- Based on: El tiempo entre costuras by María Dueñas
- Written by: Susana López Rubio; Alberto Grondona; Carlos Montero
- Directed by: Iñaki Mercero; Iñaki Peñafiel; Norberto López Amado
- Starring: Adriana Ugarte; Peter Vives; Hannah New; Elvira Mínguez; Rubén Cortada; Alba Flores; Carlos Santos; Elena Irureta; Pepa Rus; Tristán Ulloa; Mari Carmen Sánchez; David Muro; Francesc Garrido; Raúl Arévalo; Carlos Olalla; Filipe Duarte; Ben Temple; Jimmy Shaw
- Music by: Cesar Benito
- Country of origin: Spain
- Original language: Spanish
- No. of seasons: 1
- No. of episodes: 11

Production
- Executive producers: Emilio Pina; Reyes Baltanás
- Editor: Ángel Armada
- Running time: 70 minutes approx.
- Production companies: Boomerang TV; Atresmedia

Original release
- Network: Antena 3
- Release: 21 October 2013 – 20 January 2014

El tiempo entre costuras (literally The Time Between Seams, English title: The Time in Between) is a Spanish period drama television series produced by Boomerang TV for Antena 3. It is an adaptation of the same-titled 2009 novel by María Dueñas, published in the English language under the titles The Time in Between and The Seamstress. It premiered on 21 October 2013 on Antena 3. The premiere was seen by 5.018 million people, making it the most watched premiere on Antena 3 in 12 years.

== Plot ==
The story begins in 1934. Sira Quiroga is a young dressmaker from a traditional neighborhood of Madrid with her single mother Dolores. During a festival she meets Ignacio, an aspiring gentleman applying for a position in the Spanish civil service. They begin a relationship and soon decide to marry. Meanwhile, Dona Manuela's business is running slow, leaving her with no option but to close down the shop, leaving all the seamstresses, including Sira and her mother, unemployed and fully reliant on Ignacio's prestigious position as a civil servant. Sira remains unemployed until Ignacio finally convinces her to apply for a civil service post, but to do this she must learn to use a typewriter.

At the typewriter shop, she falls in love with Ramiro Arribas, which puts her in a difficult predicament. After a while, unable to cope with the guilt of betraying Ignacio's trust, she tells him she has been seeing Ramiro. Ignacio is heartbroken. He tells Dolores about Sira's betrayal, and her mother disowns her. Sira moves in with Ramiro. After months, Dolores finds Sira with the news that her long-lost father has asked to see her. They visit him together, and Sira discovers that her father is one of the wealthiest men in Madrid, Gonzalo Alvarez. When he showers her with jewels and money, Sira shares her newfound fortune with Ramiro, who suggests investing some of the money in a typewriting company in Argentina. Their investments take them to Tangier, Morocco. Sira sadly leaves her mother behind and takes a leap of faith to set off for Africa with Ramiro.

Soon, Ramiro starts wasting Sira's money on alcohol and tobacco. She has an argument with him about his money management and says she feels alone. The following day she sees a doctor as she is feeling unwell all the time, and discovers she is pregnant. Hopeful this will save her relationship, Sira hurries to their luxury apartment at the International Hotel to break the news to Ramiro, but finds the place ransacked and empty, with a letter from Ramiro saying he has decided to start a different life and has taken all Sira's money and jewels with him. In desperation Sira packs her things, leaves the hotel without a word and gets on a bus out of Tangier. On the journey she has a miscarriage and faints. She wakes up handcuffed in a hospital in Tetuoan (at that time the capital of the Spanish Protectorate of Morocco), alone, pregnant and with a series of debts that will later take their toll on her. She realizes that Ramiro never paid their bills at the hotel, leaving her with a debt of almost 2,500 French francs. The hotel gives her a year to pay before she is sent to prison. She is unable to contact her mother or return to Madrid because war has broken out there. Meanwhile, she is given shelter in Candelaria Matutera's guesthouse.

As England, Germany, and the other great powers become embroiled in the dire conflict of World War II, Sira is persuaded to return to Madrid, where she takes on a new identity to embark upon the most dangerous undertaking of her career. Thanks to her workshop, Sira meets important people like Juan Luis Beigbeder, the High Commissioner of the Protectorate; Beigbeder's mistress Rosalinda Fox, who becomes a close friend to Sira; Ramón Serrano Suñer, Francisco Franco's brother-in-law; and Alan Hillgarth, head of the British intelligence service in Spain. These people encourage Sira to become a spy, using the skills of her trade for more dangerous tasks. As the couturier of choice for an eager clientele of Nazi officers' wives, Sira becomes embroiled in a twilight world of espionage and political conspiracy rife with love, intrigue, and betrayal.

== Production ==
The series was filmed in various locations in Spain, Morocco and Portugal. María Dueñas' original novel is set in Madrid, Tangier, Tétouan and Lisbon. Most of the scenes in the series were filmed in these cities. Some of the scenes were filmed in Guadalajara and Toledo in Spain, and Estoril and Cascais in Portugal. The budget was estimated at over 500,000 euros per episode.

== Cast and characters ==
- Adriana Ugarte as Sira Quiroga aka Sira Alvarado Quiroga aka Arish Agoriuq
- Elvira Mínguez as Dolores Quiroga
- Raúl Arévalo as Ignacio
- Tristán Ulloa as Juan Luis Beigbeder
- Hannah New as Rosalinda Fox
- Peter Vives as Marcus Logan
- Carlos Santos as Félix Aranda
- Francesc Garrido as Claudio Vázquez
- Filipe Duarte as Manuel Da Silva
- Mari Carmen Sánchez as Candelaria "La Matutera"
- Rubén Cortada as Ramiro Arribas
- Carlos Serrano as Ramiro Arribas (voice)
- Pepa Rus as Paquita
- Elena Irureta as Doña Manolita
- Alba Flores as Jamila
- Carlos Olalla as Gonzalo Alvarado
- Ben Temple as Alan Hillgarth
- David Muro as Palomares
- Jimmy Shaw as Peter Fox
- Enrique Arce as Andrés
- Aurora Maestre as Doña Encarna
- Ángela Romanillos as Sira Quiroga (child)
- Aida Ballmann as Anika Von Fries

== Soundtrack ==
The music score was composed by César Benito. The soundtrack album reached #2 on Spain's iTunes Store Albums, and #1 on the Soundtracks category. It also won numerous awards, including Best Music for Television by the Academy of Sciences and Arts of Television of Spain, and is one of the most played TV soundtracks worldwide on Spotify with more than two million plays since its release.

The "Theme of Sira" from the soundtrack was used by Spanish gymnast Carolina Rodríguez in her ribbon routine since 2014, including the 2016 Summer Olympics.

== Episodes ==
No.	Title	Directed by	Original release date	Viewers (millions)	Share
1	"Amor y otras verdades"	Iñaki Mercero	21 October 2013	5.018	25.5%
2	"El camino más difícil"	Iñaki Mercero	28 October 2013	5.103	26.9%
3	"La felicidad de unos cuantos"	Iñaki Mercero	4 November 2013	5.093	26.2%
4	"Escrito en las estrellas"	Iñaki Peñafiel	11 November 2013	4.803	24.6%
5	"El sol siempre vuelve a salir"	Iñaki Peñafiel	18 November 2013	4.688	24.7%
6	"Espionaje"	Iñaki Peñafiel	25 November 2013	4.733	25.4%
7	"Un refugio en mitad de la tormenta"	Norberto López Amado	2 December 2013	4.455	23.3%
8	"El resto de nuestros días"	Norberto López Amado	9 December 2013	4.687	24.3%
9	"Los fantasmas del pasado"	Iñaki Mercero	16 December 2013	4.877	26.5%
10	"Los cuentos que no saben qué contar"	Iñaki Mercero	13 January 2014	5.014	25.2%
11	"Regreso al ayer"	Norberto López Amado & Iñaki Mercero	20 January 2014	5.536	27.8%

== International broadcast ==
The rights for El tiempo entre costuras were acquired in Italy by Canale 5; the series premiered in Italy on 25 April 2014 as Il tempo del coraggio e dell'amore (The Time of Courage and Love) and aired with an average of 3.4 million viewers (14% share). In Portugal, the series aired on TVI. In Japan, the series premiered in June 2015 on NHK General TV as Jonetsu no Shira (Sira's Passion). The rights for the series have also been acquired in China (CCTV-8), Taiwan (PTS), Hungary (MTVA), Croatia (RTL Televizija), Greece (ERT) and Chile (TVN), among others.

This series is also available on Netflix in the USA on their streaming services.

== Sequel ==
Recently Netflix produced a tv series sequel called Sira,, this its again atarted by Adriana Ugarte, Ruben Coartada and Peter Vives, the new history its set 12 years after the end of the first series.

== Awards and nominations ==
Year	Award	Category	Nominee(s)	Result	Ref.
2014	Actors Union Awards	Best Leading Actress	Adriana Ugarte	Won	
2014	Actors Union Awards	Best Supporting Actress	Elvira Mínguez	Won	
2014	Actors Union Awards	Best Supporting Actor	Carlos Santos	Won	
2014	Actors Union Awards	Best Actor in a Minor Role	Tristán Ulloa	Won	
2014	17th Iris Awards	Best Fiction		Won	
2014	17th Iris Awards	Best Actor	Peter Vives	Nominated	
2014	17th Iris Awards	Best Actress	Adriana Ugarte	Won	
2014	17th Iris Awards	Best Direction	Ignacio Mercero, Iñaki Peñafiel and Norberto L. Amado	Won	
2014	17th Iris Awards	Best Production	Gregorio Quintana, Ángeles Caballero, Emilio Pina and Reyes Baltanás	Won	
2014	17th Iris Awards	Best Cinematography Direction and Lighting	Juan Molina Temboury	Won	
2014	17th Iris Awards	Best Art Direction and Scenography	Luis Vallés and Bina Daigeler	Won	
2014	17th Iris Awards	Best Music for TV	César Benito	Won	
2014	61st Ondas Awards	Best Actress in Spanish Fiction	Adriana Ugarte	Won	
2014	2nd MiM Series Awards	Best Miniseries		Won	
2014	2nd MiM Series Awards	Best Actress	Adriana Ugarte	Won	
2014	2nd MiM Series Awards	Best Direction	Iñaki Mercero, Iñaki Peñafiel and Norberto López Amado	Won	
