= South of Heaven (film) =

2021 film by Aharon Keshales

- Theatrical release poster
- Directed by: Aharon Keshales
- Written by: Aharon Keshales; Navot Papushado; Kai Mark
- Story by: Aharon Keshales; Navot Papushado
- Produced by: Roger Birnbaum; Chadd Harbold; Aharon Keshales; Dallas Sonnier; Amanda Presmyk; Navot Papushado
- Starring: Jason Sudeikis; Evangeline Lilly; Mike Colter; Shea Whigham; Jeremy Bobb; Thaddeus J. Mixson; Michael Paré; Amaury Nolasco
- Cinematography: Matt Mitchell
- Edited by: Bryan Gaynor
- Music by: David Fleming
- Production companies: Arts District Entertainment; Swiss Avenue Pictures; Media Finance Capital; Good Wizard
- Distributed by: RLJE Films
- Release date: October 8, 2021
- Running time: 120 minutes
- Country: United States
- Language: English
- Budget: $3 million

South of Heaven is a 2021 American crime film directed by Aharon Keshales and co-written by Keshales, Navot Papushado, and Kai Mark. The film stars Jason Sudeikis, Evangeline Lilly, Mike Colter, Shea Whigham, Jeremy Bobb, Thaddeus J. Mixson, Michael Paré and Amaury Nolasco, and follows a recently paroled man (Sudeikis) whose plans to marry his terminally ill fiancée (Lilly) are halted by a corrupt parole officer (Whigham) and a local crime boss (Colter). It was released in the United States on October 8, 2021, by RLJE Films, to mixed reviews.

== Cast ==
- Jason Sudeikis as Jimmy Ray
- Evangeline Lilly as Annie Ray
- Mike Colter as Whit Price
- Shea Whigham as Officer Schmidt
- Jeremy Bobb as Frank
- Thaddeus J. Mixon as Tommy Price
- Michael Paré as Joey
- Amaury Nolasco as Manny
- Jaime Zevallos as Julio
- Greg Hill as Sam
- Rupert Reyes as a priest
- Tina Parker as a parole panel woman

== Production ==
In November 2019, it was announced Jason Sudeikis and Evangeline Lilly had joined the cast of the film, then titled Till Death, with Aharon Keshales directing from a screenplay by Keshales, Navot Papushado and Kai Mark. In January 2020, it was announced Mike Colter, Shea Whigham, Jeremy Bobb, Michael Paré and Amaury Nolasco had joined the cast of the film.

Filming occurred in Texas in March 2020. The film cost $3 million and was shot in 25 days.

== Release ==
The film was released in the United States on October 8, 2021, by RLJE Films. On the review aggregator website Rotten Tomatoes, 48% of 44 critics' reviews are positive, with an average rating of 5.2/10. The website's consensus reads: "For those willing to suspend belief, Jason Sudeikis and Evangeline Lily may make this descent into gruesome violence slightly less hellish, but South of Heaven is no promised land." Metacritic, which uses a weighted average, assigned the film a score of 42 out of 100, based on 10 critics, indicating "mixed or average" reviews. It won five of seven nominations at the AFIN International Film Festival: Best Feature Film, Best Director for Keshales, Best Actor for Sudeikis (Whigram was also nominated), Best Actress for Lilly, and Best Young Artist for Mixson, in addition to being nominated for Best Ensemble Cast.
