= Peter Vives =

Spanish actor

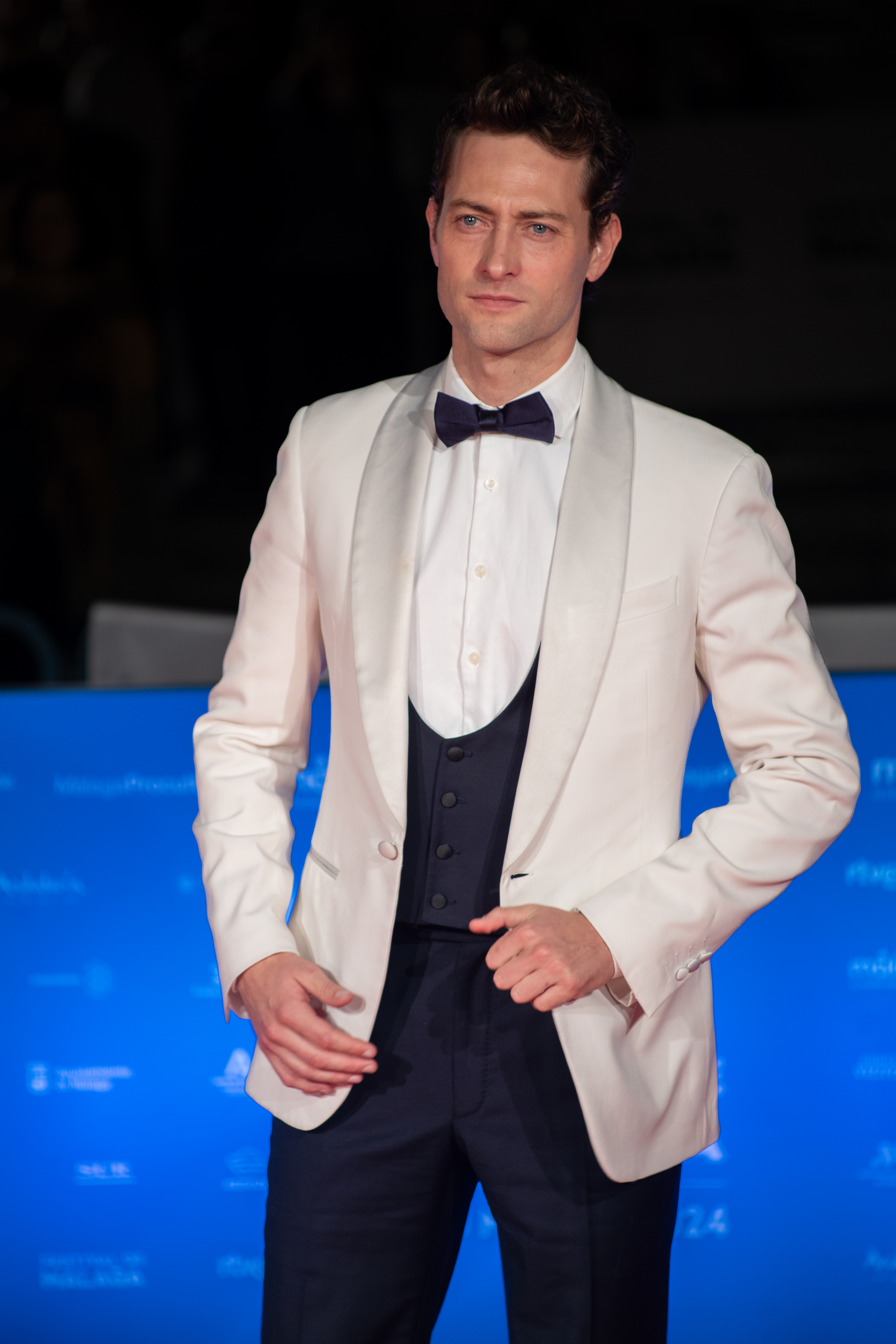
- Vives in 2024
- Born: Peter Vives Newey; 14 June 1987 (age 39); Barcelona, Catalonia, Spain
- Occupation: Actor
- Years active: 2004–present

Peter Vives Newey (born 14 July 1987) is a Catalan actor. He was born in Barcelona to a New Zealand mother and a Catalan father. He is perhaps best known for his role as Angel in The Cheetah Girls 2, where he sang and played the guitar. He also starred in television series El tiempo entre costuras as Marcus Logan.

== Filmography ==
List of film credits
Year	Film	Role	Notes
2004	Amb el 10 a l'esquena (With the 10 at the back)	Lino	TV movie Credited as 'Peter Vives Newey'
2006	The Cheetah Girls 2	Angel	TV movie
2007	Savage Grace	Mishka Harnden	
2008	Sing for Darfur	Bobby	
2009	Paintball	John	
2010	Gear School Plug & Play	Uncredited	Short
2010	Di Di Hollywood	Director Spot Fotos	Short
2011	Mil cretins (A Thousand Cretins)	El cavaller (The Knight)	
2011	Eva	Eric	
2012	Invasor	Teniente Americano (American Lieutenant)	
2012	Volare	Ivan	
2013	Barcelona, nit d'estiu	Ricard	
2017	Melocotones	Diego	

List of television credits
Year	Title	Role	Notes
2009	13 anys i un dia (Thirteen years and a day)	Uncredited	Episode "M'he deixat" (I left me)
2010	Divendres (Friday)	Himself	2 episodes
2010–2013	La Riera (The Stream)	Nil Guitart Pla	170 episodes
2011	Tvist	Himself	1 episode
2013	Águila Roja	Captain Patrick	5 episodes (season 5)
2013–2014	El tiempo entre costuras (The time between seams)	Marcus Logan	TV miniseries
2014–2016	Velvet	Carlos Álvarez	TV series
