= Bitter Seeds =

- Directed by: Micha Peled
- Written by: Micha Peled
- Produced by: Micha Peled
- Distributed by: ITVS
- Release date: September 1, 2011 (Telluride Film Festival)
- Running time: 88 minutes
- Country: United States
- Language: English

Bitter Seeds is a 2011 documentary film by American filmmaker and director and political commentator Micha Peled. The film is the third part of Peled's globalization trilogy after Store Wars: When Wal-Mart Comes to Town (2001) and China Blue (2005).

== Synopsis ==
Micha Peled's documentary on biotech (Bt) farming in India observes the impact of genetically modified cotton on India's farmers, with a suicide rate of over a quarter million Bt cotton farmers each year due to financial stress resulting from massive crop failure and the price of Monsanto's Bt seeds. The film also disputes claims by the biotech industry that Bt cotton requires less pesticide and promises of higher yields, as farmers discover that Bt cotton requires more pesticide than organic cotton, and often suffer higher levels of infestation by Mealybug resulting in devastating crop losses, and financial and psychological stress on cotton farmers. Due to the biotech seed monopoly in India, where Bt cotton seed has become the standard, and organic seed has become unobtainable, thus pressuring cotton farmers into signing Bt cotton seed purchase agreements with biotech multinational corporation Monsanto.

== Reception ==
Leslie Hassler in the Huffington Post called Bitter Seeds riveting and poignant, though in places incredibly painful to watch.

== Awards ==
The documentary has won 18 international film awards, including the Green Screen Award (2011) and the Oxfam Global Justice Award (2011).
