= Cook with the Book =

- Cocinar con el libro
- Written by: Penélpe Miranda
- Directed by: Gustavo Hernández
- Starring: Penélope Miranda
- Music by: Hernán Gonzales
- Country of origin: Uruguay
- Original language: Spanish

Production
- Producer: Emanuel K. Miranda
- Cinematography: Matías Lassarte

Original release
- Release: 8 May 2019

Cocinar con el libro (Cook with the Book) is an 8-episode Uruguayan documentary television series premiered in 2019 on TNU and TV Ciudad. The show stars chef Penélope Miranda, directed by Gustavo Hernández and produced by Emanuel K. Miranda.

== Plot ==
This TV series focuses on cooking and eating better through the teaching of techniques, tips and secrets; a culinary trip through South America guided by some of the best chefs of the world.

== Production ==
The series won the Fund for the Promotion of Film by the Audiovisual Direction of Uruguay. It featured the participation of 8 of the most influential chefs in Latin America: renowned Colombian chef Leo Espinosa, Slow Food representative in Uruguay Laura Rosano, chef specializing in Amazonian cuisine Thiago Castanho, Argentine writer Natalia Kiako, Aurelien Bondoux chef of La Bourgogne in Punta del Este, Verá, an indigenous person of Guaraní origin, the Brazilian culinary expert Bela Gil, and Pilar Rodríguez, gastronomic ambassador of Chile. The series was declared of cultural interest by the Ministry of Education and Culture of Uruguay, and in 2018 it participated in the Cannes MIPTV festival.

== Episodes ==
=== Season 1 ===
| No. | Título | Chef | | Fecha de estreno |
|---|---|---|---|---|
| 1 | A day | Leonor Espinosa | Best Latin American Chef 2017 by Latin America's 50 Best Restaurants. | May 8, 2019 |
The best directed strategies are proposed to comply with a healthy eating plan during the course of a day.
| 2 | Your pantry | Pilar Rodríguez | Gastronomic Ambassador of Chile. | May 8, 2019 |
How to build a healthy pantry, compatible with our habits and preferences, which has appetizing food, of good quality, without spending more than necessary.
| 3 | Water, body and mind | Verá | Guaraní. | May 8, 2019 |
Fundamental premises to maintain emotional balance based on the exercise of the body and the cultivation of a mind in harmony. The use of open spaces in the city and the importance of contact with nature.
| 4 | The key | Aurelien Bondoux | Chef La Bourgogne specialized in French cuisine. Ranking Latin America's 50 Best Restaurants. | May 8, 2019 |
A change of habits: advices and recommendations to carry out a permanent change, which adjusts our behavior to our way of life to adapt and direct our habits towards a conscious way of eating, taking care of basic aspects to eat well and live better.
| 5 | Your plate | Thiago Castanho | Chef specialized in cuisine of Amazonian origin. Ranking Latin America's 50 Best Restaurants | May 8, 2019 |
Premises to achieve and maintain an optimal state of health through the nutritional balance of our dishes. Organoleptic characteristics of the dish.
| 6 | Flavors | Laura Rosano | Agroecological producer, representative of Slow Food International. | May 8, 2019 |
The importance of the measured consumption of salt and sugar is raised and information on the harmful effects of their excessive use is shared.
| 7 | Your table | Bela Gil | Culinary and TV presenter. | May 8, 2019 |
Premises to carry out our intakes with an adequate balance of ingredients and in a relaxed environment away from technology. Emphasis is placed on the importance of revaluing the family table and home cooking as a cultural heritage.
| 8 | A plan | Natalia Kiako | Writer and journalist | May 8, 2019 |
The best directed strategies for the implementation of a balanced eating plan are proposed. Recommendations on how to adopt a plan that adapts to the daily nutritional requirements, according to our level of activity and respecting the different age groups.
