= The Hanged Man (2009 film) =

- Theatrical release poster
- Spanish: El juego del ahorcado
- Directed by: Manuel Gómez Pereira
- Screenplay by: Manuel Gómez Pereira; Salvador García Ruiz
- Based on: El juego del ahorcado by Imma Turbau
- Starring: Clara Lago; Álvaro Cervantes; Adriana Ugarte; Abel Folk; Victoria Pagés; Víctor Valdivia; Boris Ruiz; Àngels Bassas; Mary Murray
- Production companies: Amigo PC; Lenon Producciones; Ovideo TV; Subotica Entertainment
- Distributed by: Sony Pictures Releasing de España
- Release date: 30 January 2009 (Spain)
- Countries: Spain; Ireland
- Languages: Spanish; English

The Hanged Man (Spanish: El juego del ahorcado) is a 2009 Spanish-Irish thriller and romantic drama film directed by Manuel Gómez Pereira which stars Clara Lago and Álvaro Cervantes.

== Plot ==
Set in 1989 Girona, the fiction tracks the romance between two childhood friends (Sandra and Álvaro), as the teenage years deepen the pre-existing relationship into something closer.

== Cast ==
- Clara Lago as Sandra
- Álvaro Cervantes as David
- Adriana Ugarte as Olga
- Abel Folk as Sandra's father
- Victòria Pagès as Sandra's mother
- Víctor Valdivia as Sandra's brother
- Boris Ruiz as David's father
- Àngels Bassas as David's mother
- Mary Murray as Margaret

== Production ==
An adaptation of Imma Turbau's El juego del ahorcado, the screenplay was penned by Manuel Gómez Pereira and Salvador García Ruiz. A Spanish-Irish co-production, the film was produced by Amigo PC, Lenon Producciones, Ovideo TV, and Subotica Entertainment, and it had the participation of TVE and TVC. Shooting locations included Girona, Barcelona, and Ireland.

== Release ==
Distributed by Sony Pictures Releasing, the film was theatrically released in Spain on 30 January 2009.

== Reception ==
Mirito Torreiro of Fotogramas rated the film 3 out of 5 stars, praising the director's change of register, also writing that the film "draws a more than convincing portrait of young people devoured by sexual awakening and the desire for possession".

Jonathan Holland of Variety deemed the "flawed but intriguing" film to be "a quietly intense thriller that sees the helmer abandoning his comedies" "for something meatier".

David Bernal of Cinemanía rated the film 2 out of 5 stars, deeming it to be a "flawed drama", also pointing out that, deep down, the authorship should be attributed to Salvador García Ruiz rather than to Gómez Pereira, as "everything in this provincial teenage romance narrated in fits and starts connects with [García Ruiz's] oppressive and intimate universe".

== Accolades ==
Year	Award	Category	Nominee(s)	Result	Ref.
2009	23rd Goya Awards	Best New Actor	Álvaro Cervantes	Nominated	
2009	23rd Goya Awards	Best Original Score	Bingen Mendizábal	Nominated	

== See also ==
- List of Spanish films of 2009
