= Juan Luis Beigbeder =

Spanish military man and political leader

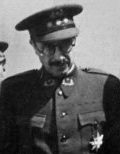
- Born: Juan Luis Beigbeder y Atienza; 31 March 1888; Cartagena, Spain
- Died: 6 June 1957 (aged 69); Madrid, Spain
- Military career
- Allegiance: Nationalist Spain
- Branch: Spanish Army
- Conflicts: Second Melillan campaign Spanish Civil War

Juan Luis Beigbeder y Atienza (31 March 1888 – 6 June 1957) was a Spanish military and political leader who held the positions of Chief of Indigenous Affairs and later High Commissioner in the Protectorate of Morocco from 1937 to 1939 then, just after the Spanish Civil War, served as Minister of Foreign Affairs between 12 August 1939 and 16 October 1940, during the rule of Francisco Franco.

== Biography ==
He took part in the wars in Africa in 1909–1910, participating in the battles of Aid Yedida, Benicorfet, Hosmar Beni, Beni-Salem and the march on Chefchaouen. After his promotion to lieutenant colonel, he was appointed military attaché to the Embassy of Spain in Berlin.

He joined the military revolt of 17 July 1936 as Chief of Indigenous Affairs and was responsible for organizing about 50,000 Moorish troops to assist Franco's revolt. On 18 July, he went to inform the Khalifa Muley Hassan and the Grand Vizier of Tetouan that a military rebellion that was taking place, getting the support of both leaders. This action earned him the friendship and cooperation of the Moroccan authorities for the rest of his stay.

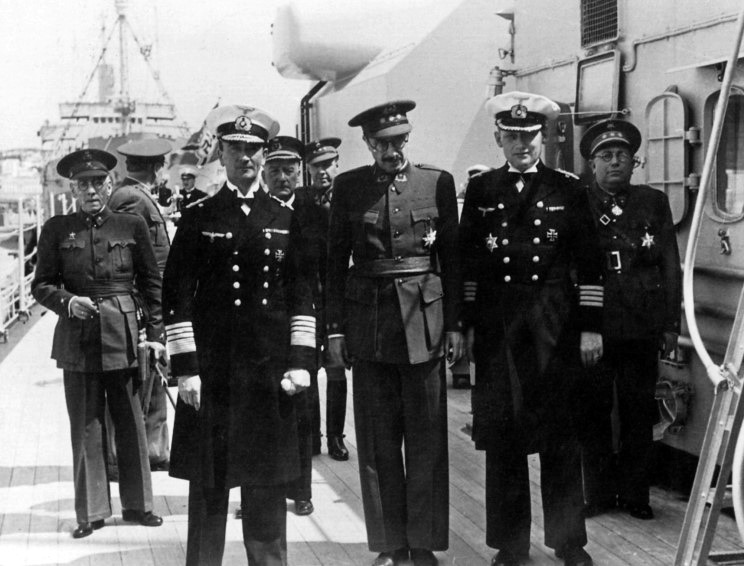
Beigbeder (center), High Commissioner of the Spanish Protectorate in Morocco, on board of the German cruiser Admiral Graf Spee at anchor at Ceuta in May 1939. He is flanked by Admiral Hermann Böhm and Kapitän zur See Hans Langsdorff.

Authorized by Franco, he negotiated with Karl-Erich Kühlenthal (military attaché of the German Embassy in Paris and friend) for transport planes, which would be bought by German private companies. He was appointed High Commissioner of Spain in Morocco on 13 April 1937. On 2 December 1937 the newly created National Council of the Movement met for the first time, and Beigbeder was one of five soldiers who participated as a member.

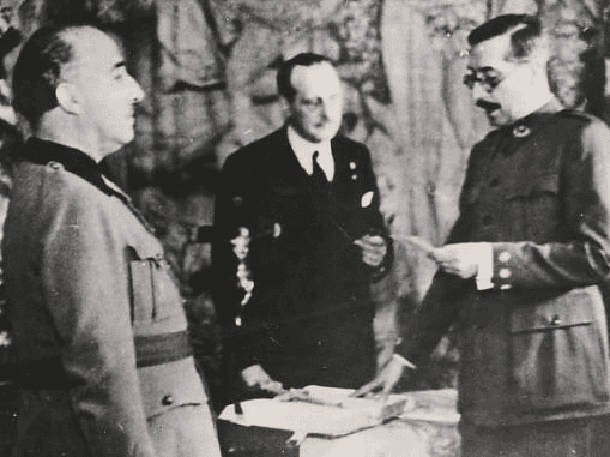
Beigbeder being sworn in as Foreign Minister in the presence of Franco. August 1939, Burgos.

In August 1939 he was appointed Foreign Minister by Franco, a post he occupied until 16 October 1940. After the beginning of World War II and the unstoppable advance of German troops on the European front, Franco replaced the Anglophile Beigbeder with Ramón Serrano Suñer, Franco's brother-in-law and a known Germanophile. Beigbeder was accused of having a weakness for foreign women, including an English friend, Rosalinda Powell Fox, who might have been a spy, and was put under house arrest in Ronda. In 1945 he was put in charge of a mission to Franklin D. Roosevelt which helped to mitigate the hostility of the victorious Allies towards Franco.

== Appearance in film and literature ==
The writer María Dueñas makes a portrait of this character in her first novel The Time In Between (2009, translated into English by Daniel Hahn 2011, also known as The Seamstress), set in the cities of Tangiers, Tetouan (capital of the Spanish Protectorate of Morocco) and Madrid in the context of the Spanish Civil War and the beginning of World War II.

In the Spanish television series El tiempo entre costuras based in the novel he's played by Tristán Ulloa.
