= Adriana Ugarte =

Spanish actress

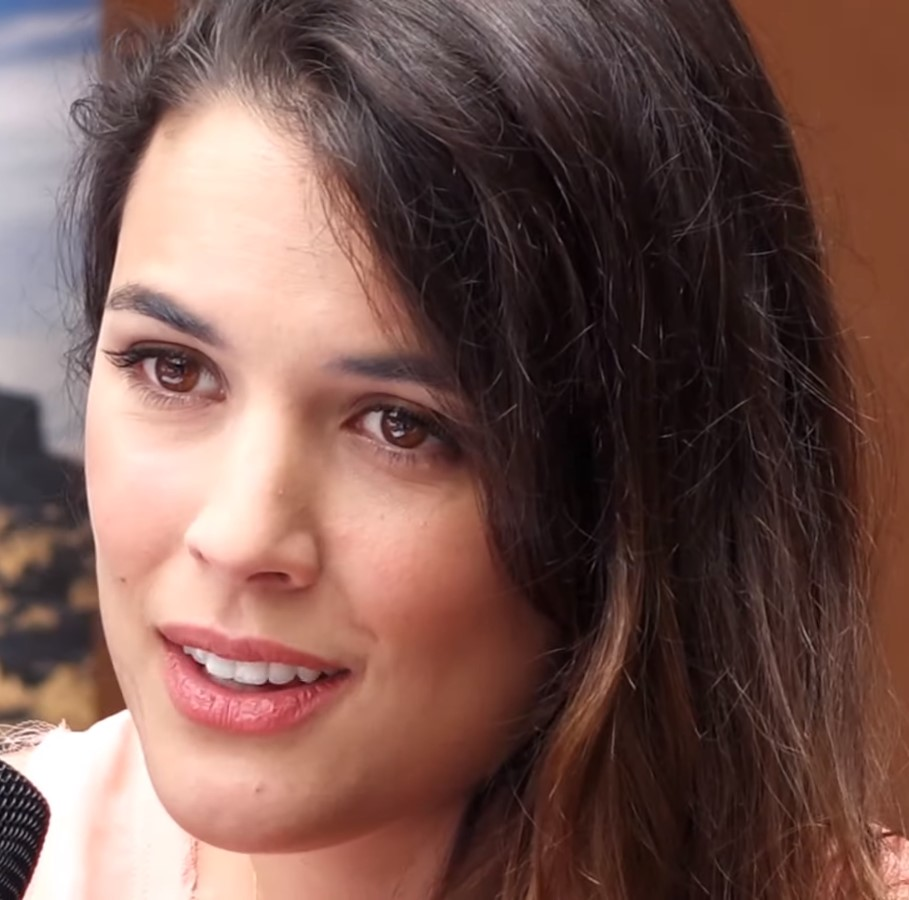
- Adriana Ugarte in 2014
- Born: Adriana Sofía Ugarte Pardal; 17 January 1985 (age 41); Madrid, Spain
- Occupation: Actress
- Years active: 2001–present
- Partner: David Broncano (2018–2019)

Adriana Sofía Ugarte Pardal (born 17 January 1985) is a Spanish actress. She is known for her leading roles on television series La Señora (The Lady) and El tiempo entre costuras (The Time in Between). Ugarte co-starred in the 2016 Pedro Almodóvar film Julieta, playing the younger version of the title character.

== Biography ==
Adriana Sofía Ugarte Pardal was born in Madrid on 17 January 1985, the daughter of Yolanda Pardal, lawyer and writer. She is the grandniece of Eduardo Ugarte, who was a collaborator of Luis Buñuel and who was married to a daughter of Carlos Arniches. She studied at the Colegio del Pilar in Madrid. She enrolled into a licentiate degree of Philosophy and Arts at the Complutense University of Madrid, which she temporarily shelved, and later resumed at the National University of Distance Education (UNED).

Ugarte, age 16, debuted in the short film Mala Espina (2001), directed by Belén Macías, and won the award for the Best Female Performance at the Alcalá de Henares Festival of Short Films for playing a schizophrenic teenage girl. She was given guest roles in TV series such as Policías, en el corazón de la calle, Hospital Central and El comisario. She was nominated to the Goya Award for Best New Actress for her role as Consuelo in the 2006 film Doghead directed by Santi Amodeo.

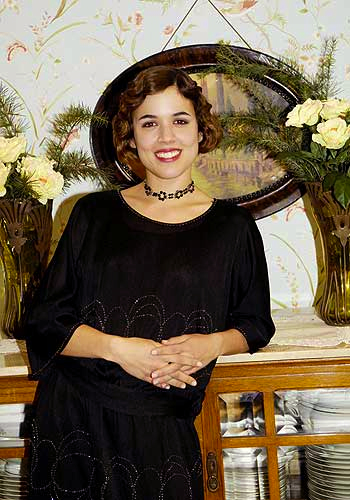
Adriana Ugarte as Victoria Márquez in La Señora

Ugarte's leading performance as Victoria Márquez de la Vega in the television series La Señora (aired from 2008 to 2010) earned her great popularity. This same year, she made an appearance in The Hanged Man, with Clara Lago and Álvaro Cervantes. She then starred in Paper Castles (2009) along with Nilo Mur and Biel Durán, and in Lo contrario al amor (2010), alongside Hugo Silva. She also featured in the miniseries Stolen Children (Telecinco), in which she plays Susana.

In 2013, two years after shooting was finalized, El tiempo entre costuras premiered, the series based on the novel of the same name by writer María Dueñas. Starring Ugarte as Sira, it achieved breaking viewing figures in Antena 3 by the closure of the series.

== Personal life ==
Between 2018 and 2019, Ugarte was in a relationship with comedian and television host David Broncano.

== Filmography ==
=== Television ===
Series	Role	Channel	Year	Notes
Policías, en el corazón de la calle	Olga	Antena 3	2002	Supporting role (2 episodes)
El secreto del héroe	Olivia	TVE	2003	Television film
El comisario	Herself	Telecinco	2006	Supporting role (1 episode)
Mesa para cinco	Julia	LaSexta	2006	Supporting role (7 episodes)
Hospital Central	Adriana / Nerea / Dr. Natalia of the Hoyo	Telecinco	2002–2011	Supporting role (8 episodes)
La Señora	Victoria Márquez of the Vega	TVE	2008–2010	Main character (36 episodes)
Stolen Children	Susana Guzmán	Telecinco	2013	Television film
El tiempo entre costuras	Sira Quiroga / Arish Agoriuq	Antena 3	2013–2014	Main character (17 episodes)
Habitaciones cerradas	Teresa Brusés	TVE	2015	Television film
La sonrisa de las mariposas	Mariana Solís de Páramo	Antena 3	2016–?	Main character (? episodes)
Hache	Helena	Netflix	2019–?	Main character (14 episodes)
Tribes of Europa	Alia	Netflix	2021	Supporting role (1 episode)
Parot	Isabel Mora	Amazon Prime Video	2021	Main character
Heridas	Manuela León Escudero	Atresplayer Premium	2022	Main character (13 episodes)
Mask Singer: Adivina quién canta	Herself / Cobra	Antena 3	2024	Contestant (4 episodes)

=== Film ===
Key
†	Denotes films that have not yet been released

Year	Title	Role	Notes	Ref.
2006	Cabeza de perro (Doghead)	Consuelo		
2007	Gente de mala calidad	Eva		
2007	El patio de mi cárcel (My Prison Yard)	Alejandra		
2009	El juego del ahorcado (The Hanged Man)	Olga		
2009	Castillos de cartón (Paper Castles)	María José		
2011	Lo mejor de Eva (Dark Impulse)	Marta		
2011	Lo contrario al amor (The Opposite of Love)	Merce		
2013	Combustion	Ari		
2013	Gente en sitios (People in Places)			
2015	Tiempo sin aire (Breathless Time)	Vero		
2015	Palmeras en la nieve (Palm Trees in the Snow)	Clarence		
2016	Julieta	Julieta		
2017	The Solar System (El sistema solar)	Inés		
2017	Tadeo Jones 2: El secreto del rey Midas	Tiffany	Voice	
2018	Amoureux de ma femme (The Other Woman)	Emma		
2018	Durante la tormenta (Mirage)	Vera Roy		
2023	Lobo feroz	Matilde		
2023	The Silence of Marcos Tremmer (El silencio de Marcos Tremmer)	Lucía		
2026	Tal vez (Love on a Tightrope)	Pinito del Oro		

=== Short films ===
- Cuánto. Más allá del dinero (2017) as Lucía
- Estocolmo (2008) as Sol
- Diminutos del calvario (2002) as Doncella
- Mala espina (2001) as Sara

=== Music videos ===
Year	Artist	Song	Ref.
2019	Vanesa Martín	"De Tus Ojos"	

== Theatre ==
- The Great Theatre of the World (2013)
- The House of Bernarda Alba (2006)

== Accolades ==
Year	Award	Category	Work	Result	Ref.
2007	21st Goya Awards	Best New Actress	Doghead	Nominated	
2010	60th Fotogramas de Plata	Best TV Actress	La señora	Won	
2010	19th Actors and Actresses Union Awards	Best Television Actress in a Leading Role	La señora	Won	
2010	12th ATV Awards	Best Actress in a TV Series	La señora	Nominated	
2014	64th Fotogramas de Plata	Best TV Actress	The Time in Between	Won	
2014	23rd Actors and Actresses Union Awards	Best Television Actress in a Leading Role	The Time in Between	Won	
2014	Iris Awards	Best Actress in a TV Series	The Time in Between	Won	
2014	61st Ondas Awards	Best Female Actress of National Fiction	The Time in Between	Won	
2016	29th European Film Awards	Best European Actress	Julieta	Nominated	
2017	22nd Forqué Awards	Best Actress	Julieta	Nominated	
2017	72nd CEC Medals	Best Actress	Julieta	Nominated	
2017	4th Feroz Awards	Best Actress in a Film	Julieta	Nominated	
