= Paper Castles (film) =

- Theatrical release poster
- Spanish: Castillos de cartón
- Directed by: Salvador García Ruiz
- Screenplay by: Enrique Urbizu
- Based on: Castillos de cartón by Almudena Grandes
- Produced by: Gerardo Herrero; Mariela Besuievsky; Javier López Blanco
- Starring: Adriana Ugarte; Nilo Mur; Biel Durán
- Cinematography: Teo Delgado
- Edited by: Berta Frías
- Music by: Pascal Gaigne
- Production companies: Castafiore Films; Tornasol Films
- Distributed by: Alta Classics
- Release dates: 25 October 2009 (Seminci); 30 October 2009 (Spain)
- Country: Spain
- Language: Spanish

Paper Castles (Spanish: Castillos de cartón) is a 2009 Spanish romantic drama film directed by Salvador García Ruiz from a screenplay by Enrique Urbizu based on the novel Castillos de cartón by Almudena Grandes. It stars Adriana Ugarte, Nilo Mur, and Biel Durán.

== Plot ==
Set in Madrid in the 1980s, the plot concerns about the love triangle between three art students, María José, Marcos, and Jaime.

Art students María José and fellow student Marcos are attracted to each other, but when their romantic feelings get phisycal, they discover Marcos's apparent impotence. Jaime, Marcos's best friend, cheerfully swoops in because he too likes María José, and believes Marcos's problems are due to stress, which he proposes to relieve by having a three-persons relationship. María José, initially reluctant, agrees when the two young men both profess their affection and respect for her.

The relationship is lived openly at college, although the three don't come out to their families, and lasts through their students' years, facing some negative attitudes by other students, as well as some internal problems with boundaries, balance, jealousy, future plans, and sexual identity. Jaime, who's straight, suggests that Marcos might be gay, which Marcos denies, while his impotence gradually subsides. Overall, the three genuinely care about each other, and Marcos's recurrent depression worries the other two partners.

Upon graduation, however, tensions escalate for planning the future becomes a necessity, exasperated by the fact that Marcos seems to have a promising career while Jaime, though very ambitious, has little talent; María José, on the other hand, is talented but has not ambition. Marcos attempts to salvage the relationship by proposing that the three of them live and paint toghether while he, with his work's earnings, would pay for most of the expenses; he confesses his love and need for both María José and Jaime. Jaime rejects the proposal, while María José hesitates, leaving the ending open.

== Cast ==
- Adriana Ugarte as María José
- Nilo Mur as Marcos
- Biel Durán as Jaime
- Diego Braguinsky
- Lola Marceli
- Pepa Pedroche
- Toni Misó

== Production ==
Based on the novel by Almudena Grandes, the adapted screenplay was penned by Enrique Urbizu. The film was produced by Tornasol Films and Castafiore Films, and it had the participation of TVE and Canal+. Filming began at Alicante's Ciudad de la Luz studio in June 2008.

== Release ==
The film premiered at the 54th Valladolid International Film Festival (Seminci) on 25 October 2009. Distributed by Alta Classics, it was theatrically released in Spain on 30 October 2009.

== Reception ==
Oskar L. Belategui of El Correo considered that "afflicted with a languid rhythm and a lacerating visual poverty", the film fails both as "a moral tale and as a story of initiation".

Jonathan Holland of Variety assessed that the film feels as "flimsy as its title" and cannot be saved from Urbizu's "uncharacteristically overwrought" script, best efforts from the three leads notwithstanding.

Javier Cortijo of ABC considered that "a certain mechanical callousness threatens to derail" the film, "which is still estimable."

Jordi Costa of El País found the film to be "one of the least sexual movies with the most sex that [he] remembers watching", citing "the praiseworthy effort of swimming against inertia and commonplace".

== See also ==
- List of Spanish films of 2009
