= Store Wars: When Wal-Mart Comes to Town =

Documentary by Micha Peled

- Store Wars: When Wal-Mart Comes to Town Poster
- Directed by: Micha Peled
- Written by: Micha Peled
- Produced by: Micha Peled; Independent Television Service; Corporation for Public Broadcasting
- Starring: Sam Walton
- Cinematography: Allen Moore
- Edited by: Ken Schneider
- Music by: Pete Sears
- Release date: 2 October 2001
- Running time: 59 minutes
- Country: United States

Store Wars: When Wal-Mart Comes to Town is a documentary based on a true story, directed by filmmaker Micha Peled. The movie was released on October 2, 2001. It is Peled's second documentary after Will My Mother Go Back to Berlin? (1993). It is the part one of Peled's Globalization Trilogy where the other two films of the trilogy are China Blue (2005) and Bitter Seeds (2011). The film's music was directed by Pete Sears and the cinematography was taken care by Allen Moore. It was premiered in South by Southwest Film Festival in 2001. The documentary won CINE Golden Eagle Awards and Golden Gate award in San Francisco International Film Festival.

== Plot and themes ==
The film has the background as the real situation at Ashland, Virginia, US when the population of Ashland engaged into a year long struggle and conflict with the members of the same community as Walmart decided to set up one of its megastores in the town. The event milestones narrated in the film may be considered to be starting from the first "public hearing that galvanizes residents' opposition" to the final voting that the Town Council concluded. Being faithful to the actual historical events, the movie depicts the conflict between the community on the ground if the proposed megastore would be beneficial for the community or not where the population was divided into two parts in favor and in against the proposal.

== Cast ==
- Sam Walton

== Receptions ==
=== Critical reception ===
The movie received mixed reception from different audiences and film critics. The movie received praise mainly for its ability to convey the event sequences with cinematic suspense. Tamara Straus of Newsreview wrote "Ashland was torn asunder by Wal-Mart’s proposal to come to town. Not since the Civil War or the civil-rights movement.... In Store Wars one can witness street protests led by a group called the Pink Flamingos, late-night discussions over homemade pies and the inevitable political maneuverings among prominent citizens and elected officials". Julie Salamon of New York Times has compared the depiction in the film as a "David vs. Goliath scenario". A. Bruce Dotson of University of Virginia remarked "The video provides a human perspective that is missing from textbooks". Al Norman from Sprawl-Busters commented "Store Wars takes you inside the grassroots politics of Ashland, Virginia, and inside a campaign by Wal-Mart to overpower the town. It is not pretty, but it lays out why Wal-Mart has become the most reviled corporation in America today".

=== Festivals ===
Award/Festival	Year	Category	Won/Screened
South by Southwest Film Festival	2001	Official Premiere	Screened
CINE Golden Eagle Awards	2001	Best Documentary	Won
San Francisco International Film Festival, Golden Gate award	2001	Best Documentary	Won
