= Gustavo Hernández Ibañez =

Uruguayan film director

Gustavo Hernández
- Born: Gustavo Hernández; 21 February 1973 (age 53); Montevideo, Uruguay
- Occupation: Film Director
- Known for: Cook with the book

Gustavo Hernández (born 21 February 1973) is an Uruguayan film director and scriptwriter mainly known for the horror film The Silent House (2009), winner of numerous international film awards. The film became a cult film and was highly valued by international critics, and became the first Uruguayan film to get its remake in Hollywood. Gustavo Hernandez has also directed numerous TV series, including Adicciones and Cook with the book.

== Life and career ==
Gustavo Hernandez studied at Escuela de cine del Uruguay. His career began working as a director, assistant director and editor for important production companies in Uruguay. He also directed several video clips for bands like NTVG and La Vela Puerca. His second film, Local God (2015), participated in international film festivals such as Sitges.

In 2018 he directed the film You shall not sleep, with the participation of Bélen Ruedas, Eva De Dominici and Eugenia Tobal. In 2022 he presents his new zombie film Virus 32 produced in Uruguay. The same year he directed the documentary TV series "Cook with the Book" produced by Emanuel K. Miranda and starring Penélope Miranda.

== Filmography ==
=== Films ===
- The Silent House (2010)
- Local God (2014)
- You Shall Not Sleep (2018)
- Virus 32 (2022)
- Lobo feroz (2023)

=== Television series ===
- Adicciones (2011) Season 1.
- Cook with the Book (2019) Season 1, Episode 1 "One Day".
- Cook with the Book (2019) Season 1, Episode 2 "Your Cupboard".
- Cook with the Book (2019) Season 1, Episode 3 "Water, Body and Mind".
- Cook with the Book (2019) Season 1, Episode 4 "The Key".
- Cook with the Book (2019) Season 1, Episode 5 "Your Plate".
- Cook with the Book (2019) Season 1, Episode 6 "Flavors".
- Cook with the Book (2019) Season 1, Episode 7 "Your Table".
- Cook with the Book (2019) Season 1, Episode 8 "A Plan".
