= Micha Peled =

Israeli filmmaker

- מיכה פלד
- Born: Israel
- Occupations: Film Director, Screenwriter
- Years active: 1993−present
- Known for: Store Wars: When Wal-Mart Comes to Town; China Blue; Bitter Seeds

Micha Peled (Hebrew: מיכה פלד) or Micha X. Peled is a San Francisco based Israeli film maker. He is known for his Globalization Trilogy, a series of three films including Store Wars: When Wal-Mart Comes to Town,China Blue and Bitter Seeds.

== Biography and career ==
Peled was born and raised in Israel from where he moved to US by hitchhiking. In the US, he became a trader of imported hammocks and sheepskin jackets. He consequently explored the job of a prison guard and then became a freelance journalist. Peled then got actively involved in the Nuclear Freeze Campaign and was one of its directors. He became the executive director of the organization called Media Alliance, a media watchdog agency based in San Francisco. During this time, he directed his first television documentary.

Soon he directed his first film - Will My Mother Go Back to Berlin? in 1993. After his first film, Peled left his full time job and became a film maker. He directed his second film Inside God's Bunker next year and then You, Me, Jerusalem in 1995. His first three films are themed on different conflicts and situations related to contemporary Jewish diaspora and Jewish population in Israel. In 1999, he founded Teddy Bear Films, a non-profit organization for promoting film making and story telling art.

Peled directed Store Wars: When Wal-Mart Comes to Town in 2001 which is the first film in his Globalization Trilogy. The film is based on the real situation at Ashland, Virginia, US where a dramatic situation evolved as Walmart announced to build its megastore in the town. The film was premiered in South by Southwest Film Festival in 2001 and won CINE Golden Eagle Awards and Golden Gate award in San Francisco International Film Festival. His second film in the Globalization Trilogy series is China Blue in 2005. The film focuses on the sweatshop conditions in factories in China and the growing importance of China as an exporting country on a global scale. At the 2005 Amnesty International film festival, it won the Amnesty International-DOEN Award. His third film of Globalization Trilogy is Bitter seeds, which is also his last film as on 2021. The film is about the biotech (Bt) farming in India which analyses the general impact of farming genetically modified cotton, specifically on Indian farmers. The film focuses on the suicide rate of over a quarter million Bt cotton Indian farmers per year due to financial difficulties caused by the massive crop failure in addition to the price of Monsanto's Bt seeds. The film won Green Screen Award (2011) and the Oxfam Global Justice Award (2011).

== Filmography ==
Year	Film	Awards	By	References
1993	Will My Mother Go Back to Berlin?	Best Documentary	Hawaii International Film Festival	
1994	Inside God's Bunker	Special Screening	San Francisco Jewish Film Festival	
1995	You, Me, Jerusalem	Special Screening	San Francisco Jewish Film Festival	
2001	Store Wars: When Wal-Mart Comes to Town	Golden Gate award	San Francisco International Film Festival	
2005	China Blue	Amnesty International-DOEN Award	Amnesty International film festival	
2011	Bitter Seeds	Oxfam Global Justice Award	Oxfam International	
