= Frank Ilfman =

Israeli award-winning composer (born 1970)

Frank Ilfman חיים פרנק אילפמן
- Born: Haim Frank Ilfman
- Occupation: Film composer
- Website: frankilfman.com

Haim Frank Ilfman (Hebrew: חיים פרנק אילפמן; born 18 March 1970) is a German / Israeli composer. He has scored more than forty films and numerous television shows, as well as the fanfare for Legendary Entertainment.

== Early life and education ==
Ilfman studied trombone and piano at the Jaffa Conservatorium of Music in Tel Aviv and as a young teenager was playing lead trombone with the Tel Aviv Dixieland Band. He was eventually asked to leave the conservatorium for truancy.

In 1984, during a visit to Berlin, Ilfman was introduced to German composer Klaus Doldinger, at that time was scoring The NeverEnding Story. A visit to the film's recording sessions had a powerful impact on Ilfman, who henceforth committed himself to composing for films.

== Career ==
Ilfman's scores include the films Big Bad Wolves and Cupcakes, with scores performed by The London Metropolitan Orchestra at Air Studios.

He has also scored May I Kill U?, a dark comedy, directed by Stuart Urban and starring Kevin Bishop; Mercenaries, directed by Paris Leonti, starring Robert Fucilla and Billy Zane; the three-part documentaries The Iraq War and Putin, Russia and the West for BBC and the film Bitter Seeds, directed by Micha Peled.

Ilfman's works includes Ghost Stories and 68 Kill; the Danish thriller Robin and the film adaptation of the book The Etruscan Smile; the film's score was recorded at Air Studios in London and was performed by the London Metropolitan Orchestra.

In 2008 Ilfman was invited to join the European Film Academy and The British Academy of Film and Television Arts (BAFTA).

== Filmography ==
=== Films ===
- Emotional Rescue
- Big Bad Wolves
- Locked In
- May I kill U?
- Cupcakes (AKA Bananot)
- Coward
- Incessant Visions
- Bitter Seeds
- Mercenaries
- Rabies (Kalevet)
- Fifth Street
- The Ferryman
- Nemesis Game
- The Intruder
- Soda

=== Television ===
- The Iraq war
- Russia’s Open Book
- Football Gladiators
- Irena Sendler: In the Name of Their Mothers
- Putin, Russia and the West
- Different Life
- The Wanders
- Here / Shapiro

== Awards and recognition ==
- 2013 Sitges Film Festival: Jury Special Mention Best Music in a Movie 2013- Big Bad Wolves
- The New Zealand Film & TV Awards: Best Soundtrack- Nemesis Game
