= Sant Pere, Besalú =

Benedictine monastery in Besalú, Garrotxa, Catalonia, Spain

Coordinates: 42.198056°N 2.69875°E

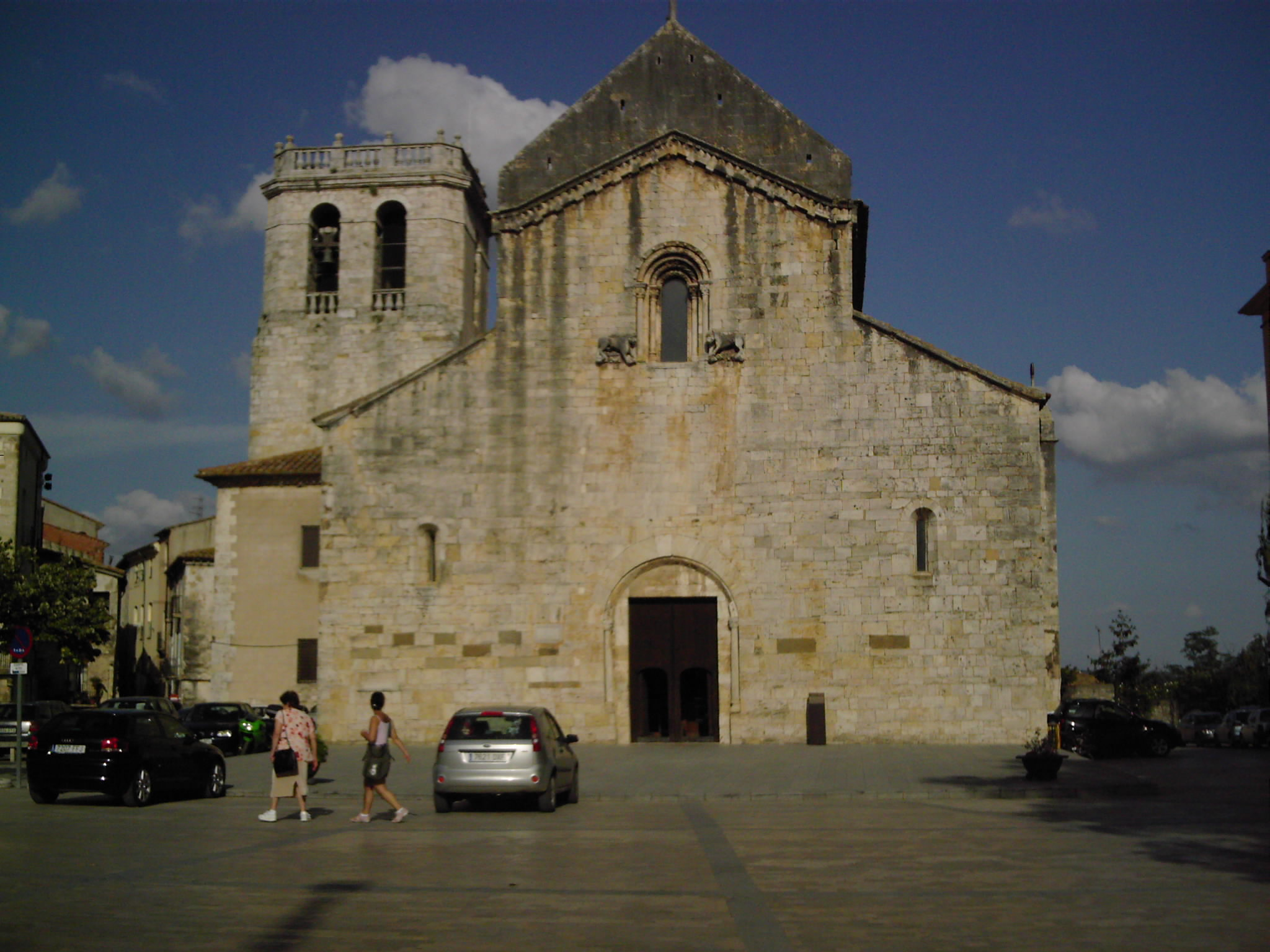
Sant Pere de Besalú

Sant Pere de Besalú is a Benedictine monastery in Besalú, Garrotxa, Catalonia, Spain. The building was renovated in 1160.

== History ==
Founded in 977 by Count Besalu of Girona, Bonfill Miró, it was placed under the patronage of the Holy See of Rome and secured the transfer of the relics of the Saints Primus and Felician. Two years later, Pope Benedict VII granted the privilege to the monastery to choose an abbot. Expansion occurred during the 12th and 13th centuries.

== Architecture and fittings ==
Constructed in the basilica style, there are three naves and a large central apse. The nave is covered with a barrel vault and side vaults. Outside, the apse has a double deck at its edge, decorated with blind arcades and a sawtooth frieze. The main facade consists of a portal arch with edge and two small columns. Located on the door is a window and carvings with geometric and plant motifs, which are also supported by columns with carved capitals. On both sides of this window, there are lion faces, a snake and a monkey.

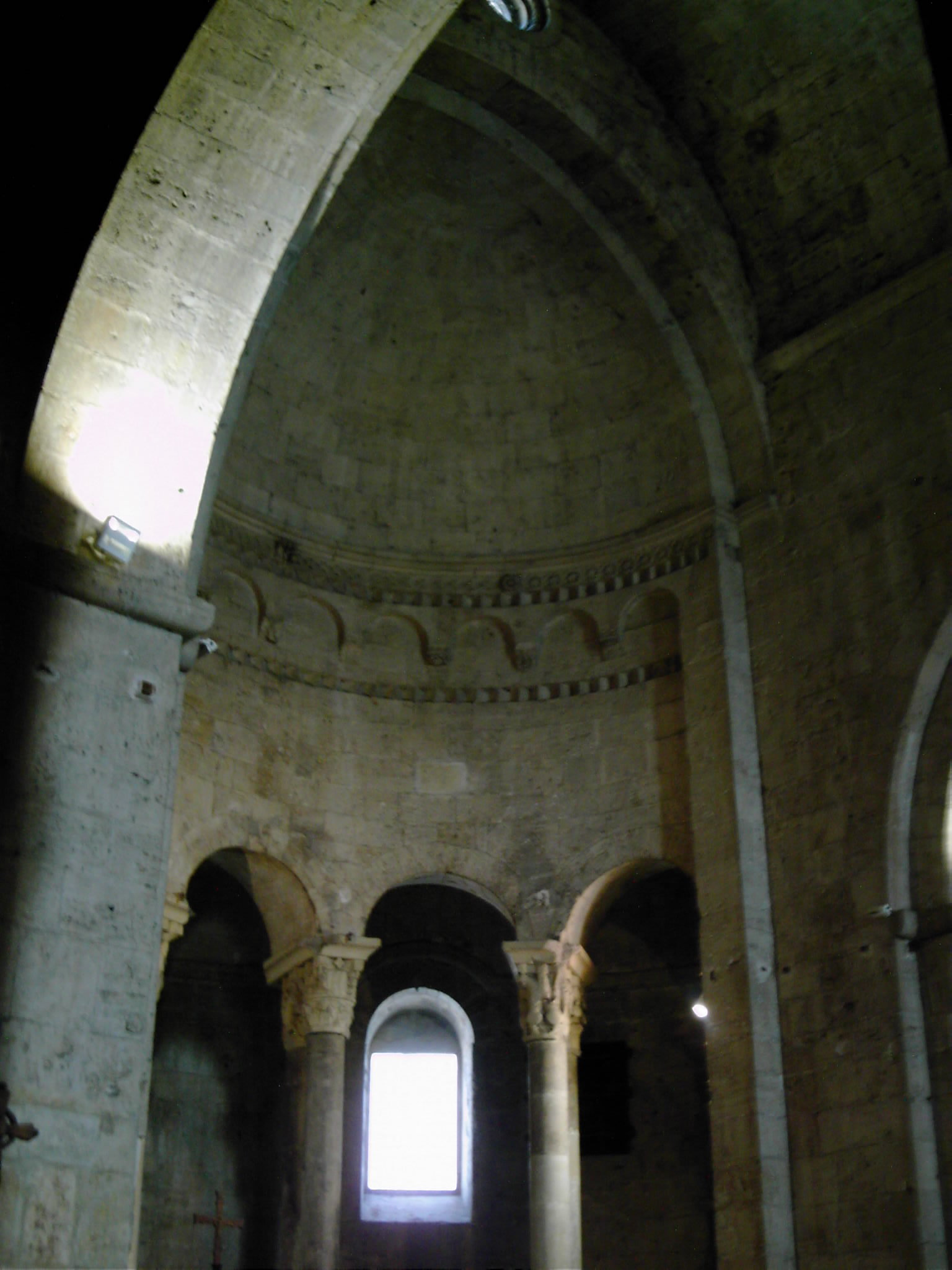
The ambulatory

The ambulatory consists of eight columns in pairs with carved capitals holding five arches on which the apse vault is located. The theme of the capitals is varied from acanthus leaves to human figures, with one of them representing Herod the Great being advised by the devil and the Massacre of the Innocents.

== Bibliography ==
- Pladevall, Antoni (1999). Guies Romànica Catalunya, La Garrotxa. Barcelona, Pòrtic. ISBN 84-412-0229-X .
