= China Blue =

- Directed by: Micha X. Peled
- Produced by: Micha X. Peled
- Cinematography: Micha X. Peled
- Edited by: Manuel Tsingaris
- Release date: 2005
- Running time: 86 minutes
- Country: United States

China Blue is a 2005 documentary film directed by Micha Peled. It follows the life of Jasmine Li, a seventeen-year-old worker from Sichuan, in a Chinese jeans factory, Lifeng Clothes Factory (丽锋服饰制衣有限公司) in Shaxi, Guangdong producing Vigaze Jeans (a company based in Istanbul, Turkey), hence the title. Jasmine earned about half a yuan for one hour's work (which amounted to about six US cents).

The documentary discusses the sweatshop conditions in factories in China and China's growing importance as a global exporting country. It's part of Teddy Bear Films' Globalization Trilogy together with Store Wars: When Wal-Mart Comes to Town, that focuses on consumerism in the U.S., and Bitter Seeds, that looks at the raw materials – the crisis of the farmers in India who are growing the cotton exported to China's garment factories to be used for the clothes sold in the West.

At the 2005 Amnesty International film festival, it won the Amnesty International-DOEN Award. In April 2007, China Blue aired on the award-winning PBS series Independent Lens.

The Vigaze Jeans Company went out of business sometime around December 2011 and January 2012 according to the last archived version of their website on Wayback Machine.

== Reception ==
On review aggregator website Rotten Tomatoes, the film holds an approval rating of 100% based on 16 reviews, with an average rating of 8.5/10.
