= Pinito del Oro =

Spanish trapeze artist (1931–2017)

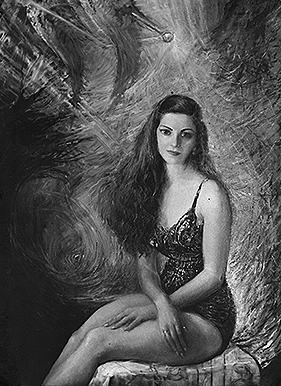
- Born: María Cristina del Pino Segura Gómez; 6 November 1931; Las Palmas, Spain
- Died: 25 October 2017 (aged 86); Las Palmas de Gran Canaria, Spain
- Occupations: Trapeze artist; novelist
- Employer: Ringling Circus
- Parent: José Segura Fenollar (father)

María Cristina del Pino Segura Gómez, known as Pinito del Oro (6 November 1931 – 25 October 2017), was a Spanish trapeze artist and novelist. She specialised in the Washington trapeze. She was perhaps best known for her seven-year run with Ringling Circus.

== Early life ==
María Cristina del Pino Segura Gómez was born on 6 November 1931 in the neighborhood of Guanarteme (Las Palmas de Gran Canaria). Her father, José Segura Fenollar, was one of the eleven brothers of the circus Hermanos Segura. She was the youngest of the seven children who lived of the 19 children her mother had. All the siblings became artists.

During her childhood, one night, when the Segura troupe traveled from Cádiz to the Seville Fair, their truck overturned, and her sister Esther was killed. Although her father did not believe in Cristina's talent, he found it necessary to promote her to the trapeze to sustain the family business.

== Career ==
During a Christmas in Valencia, when she was working in a small circus, Pinito was seen by a Ringling Bros. and Barnum & Bailey representative during a European trip, which led to the circus offering her a job. She accepted the offer and moved to the United States with her husband. She worked for seven years at the Ringling Circus, where she won many awards during the 1960s.

Cecil B. DeMille tried to hire Pinito for The Greatest Show on Earth, but she rejected it because DeMille did not want her to appear in the credits.

Pinito suffered three near-fatal falls in Huelva, Sweden and Laredo. In the first, when she was 17 years old, she fractured her skull and remained in a coma for eight days. She would soon fracture her skull again, her hands three times, and had to undergo foot surgery to raise her toes since they curved from the frequent contact with the trapeze, 12 to 16 meters above the ground.

After suffering multiple accidents, Pinito retired from the trapeze in 1961. A few years later, in 1968, she reappeared in the Circo Price of Madrid under the direction of Feijoo and Castilla. She retired from the trapeze permanently on April 17, 1976.

In addition to the circus performances, Pinito del Oro published several books: "Trapeze. Knowledge and technique" (Trapecio. Conocimiento y técnica); Memories of a trapeze artist. Autobiography (Memorias de una trapecista. Autobiografía); the anthology of short stories Tales from the circus (Cuentos de circo), and the novels Born for the circus (Nacida para el circo), The Eve (La víspera) and The Italian (El italiano). With them, she was a finalist in some literary contests such as the "City of Oviedo" and "Blasco Ibáñez".

In 2017, after receiving the Gold Medal of Canarias, she declared, reflecting on her life: "I just felt happy on the trapeze. I have triumphed in the artistic world, I achieved everything, but on a personal level the balance is not so positive."

== Death ==
Pinito del Oro died from a stroke on 25 October 2017 at her home in Las Palmas de Gran Canaria at the age of 86.

== Honors and cultural depictions ==
Pinito's Washington trapeze, as well as one of her costumes, is exhibited in the Circusland museum in Besalú, Catalonia. She is depicted as a wax statue in the Wax Museum of Madrid.

In June 2024, Canarias' Film Archive (Filmoteca Canaria) announced the reception of Juan Lucas Abreu's donation of Pinito's audiovisual archive from 1950 to 1960. It comprised 16 mm film rolls, VHS cassettes and other images in super-8 format. These materials were digitized in Santa Cruz de Tenerife's Historical Provincial Archive.

The 2026 movie Tal vez, by Spanish director Arima León, is inspired by hers and poetess Natalia Sosa Ayala's decade-long epistolar romantic relationship. The actress Adriana Ugarte plays Pinito del Oro, while Tania Santana plays Natalia Sosa. Sosa published their exchanged letters in 1996, on which Arima León's movie is based, in her literary work From my attic and other articles. Neurosis. Letters (Desde mi desván y otros artículos. Neurosis. Cartas).

The house of culture of Albaladejo in the province of Ciudad Real takes the name "Pinito del Oro" in honor of Pinito's mother, who was a citizen of this locality in Castile-La Mancha.

In popular oral tradition, her name is evoked as a symbol of inimitable skill: You are going to fall, you are not Pinito del Oro! (¡Que te vas a caer, a ver si te crees Pinito del Oro!).

== Awards ==
- National Prize of Circus (1990)
- Inclusion in the Circus Ring of Fame (2014)
- Gold Medal of Canarias (2017)
