= Rabies (2010 film) =

- English language poster
- Hebrew: כלבת
- Directed by: Aharon Keshales; Navot Papushado
- Written by: Aharon Keshales; Navot Papushado
- Produced by: Tami Leon; Chilik Michaeli; Avraham Pirchi; Julia Schifter
- Starring: Lior Ashkenazi; Ania Bukstein; Danny Geva; Yael Grobglas
- Cinematography: Guy Raz
- Edited by: Aharon Keshales; Navot Papushado
- Music by: Frank Ilfman
- Production company: United Channel Movies
- Distributed by: Image Entertainment (USA)
- Release date: October 17, 2010
- Running time: 90 minutes
- Country: Israel
- Language: Hebrew
- Budget: $500,000 (estimated)

Rabies (Hebrew: כלבת, Kalevet) is a 2010 Israeli film written and directed by Aharon Keshales and Navot Papushado. It was marketed as "the first feature-length Israeli horror film".

The film was released in theaters in Israel on December 1, 2010, and won the Ophir Award in 2011 for Best Makeup. It was the fifth most-watched Israeli film of 2011, attracting 33,000 viewers to the box office.

== Plot ==
A brother and sister are on the run, determined to keep their incestuous relationship a secret. While hiding deep in a forest, among many traps and landmines, the siblings are not alone: the park ranger, his wife and dog; four friends on their way to have a game of tennis; two police officers; and a serial killer. They all encounter each other in various ways, but not all of them will survive.

== International recognition ==
The film achieved great international success. It participated in over 50 festivals worldwide and was sold for distribution in dozens of countries. At the Tribeca Film Festival, the film was selected as one of the top five films of the festival by Los Angeles Times, Variety, Wall Street Journal, and others. The film won the "Best Horror Film" award at the Horror Festival in Denver, Colorado (where Jeffrey Reddick, creator of the Final Destination series, was a judge); the "Best Horror Film" award at the Buenos Aires Horror Festival; the "Audience Favorite" award at the Edinburgh Festival; the Critics' Prize at the Fantasporto Festival in Portugal, and received honorable mentions and special recognitions at several other festivals.

== Cast ==
- Lior Ashkenazi as Danny
- Ania Bukstein as Adi
- Danny Geva as Yuval
- Yael Grobglas as Shir
- Henry David as Ofer
- Ran Danker as Mikey
- Liat Har-lev as Tali
- Yaron Motola as The man in overalls
- Menashe Noy as Menashe
- Ofer Shechter as Pini
- Efrat Boimold as Rona
- Efrat Rayten
- Kareen Ophir
- Dror Keren
