= Big Bad Wolves =

- US release poster
- מי מפחד מהזאב הרע
- Directed by: Aharon Keshales; Navot Papushado
- Written by: Aharon Keshales; Navot Papushado
- Produced by: Tami Leon; Hillick Michaeli; Avraham Pirchi; Moshe Edery; Leon Edery
- Starring: Lior Ashkenazi; Tzahi Grad; Rotem Keinan; Doval'e Glickman
- Cinematography: Giora Bejach
- Edited by: Asaf Corman
- Music by: Haim Frank Ilfman
- Production companies: United Channel Movies; United King Studios
- Distributed by: Magnet Releasing
- Release dates: 21 April 2013 (Tribeca); 15 August 2013 (Israel)
- Running time: 110 minutes
- Country: Israel
- Language: Hebrew
- Box office: $291,239

Big Bad Wolves (Hebrew: מי מפחד מהזאב הרע, Mi mefakhed mehaze'ev hara, direct translation: "Who's afraid of the bad wolf") is a 2013 Israeli black comedy horror-thriller film written and directed by Aharon Keshales and Navot Papushado, produced by Tami Leon and by Moshe and Leon Edry through their United King Films banner. The film focuses on the story of three Israeli adults who abduct a young school teacher in order to torture and interrogate him about the murder and rape case of a young girl in the woods.

The film was the official selection of Tribeca Film Festival and premiered in the festival on April 21, 2013. The film was released on August 15, 2013 in Israel and received mostly positive reviews across Israel, the United States, and other countries worldwide and was screened in various other film festivals, mainly for its humor, screenwriting, direction, torture scenes, acting and originality. Filmmaker Quentin Tarantino praised the film and called it 2013's best film, with his praise being labeled on the film's US poster.

== Plot ==
Somewhere in Israel, three children play hide-and-seek in the woods. One of the girls hides in the closet in an abandoned house, from where she is abducted by an unknown perpetrator. Dror, a school teacher, is suspected of the crime and is arrested by the police. He is subjected to torture by a police team led by Micki to reveal the location of the missing girl. This whole episode is shot on his phone by a kid who happens to be playing in the vicinity and is subsequently uploaded onto YouTube.

An unnamed caller leads the police to the location of the girl's body in a field. She has been sexually assaulted and her head is missing. According to Jewish law, a Jew is to be buried as he was born – complete with all his limbs and organs. Micki is subsequently fired from the police force, but he plans to kidnap Dror to extract a confession and thus clear his name. The case is handed over to another police officer, Rami. The girl's father, Gidi, himself a retired military man, also suspects Dror of his involvement and plans to kidnap him.

Dror is first kidnapped by Micki but later both of them are kidnapped by Gidi and taken to an abandoned house in the middle of an area surrounded by Arab villages. Here, both Micki and Gidi take turns torturing Dror, until he convinces Micki that he might after all be innocent. Gidi, a hardened veteran, doesn't fall for the trick and manages to disarm and shackle Micki in his basement. Upon hearing the fabricated story that he might be ill, Gidi's father comes to visit him with some hot soup and accidentally encounters the two captives in the basement. Gidi's father, an Army veteran, decides to help his son in tracing his granddaughter's missing head.

Micki, who has in his possession a rusty nail, asks Dror to lie about the location of the girl's head to buy them some time to escape. Gidi then leaves the house to locate his daughter's missing head and Micki also escapes and goes out to look for help. He makes a phone call to the police department, where he learns that his daughter is missing. It then strikes him that Dror referred to his daughter in a conversation while he had no way of knowing that Micki had a daughter. Gidi searches the described location for his daughter's head but upon not finding anything comes back and starts cutting off Dror's head with a rip saw. Micki also reaches the house and tries to ask Dror for the location of his daughter but Dror dies before he can reply.

In the final scene, Rami is shown inspecting Dror's house for any clues. He does not find anything and leaves the house. Micki's daughter is shown unconscious behind a fake wall.

== Cast ==
- Lior Ashkenazi as Micki
- Tzahi Grad as Gidi
- Rotem Keinan as Dror, a school teacher
- Dov Glickman as Yoram, Gidi's father
- Guy Adler as Eli, a cop
- Dvir Benedek as Tsvika, the police commissioner
- Gur Bentwich as Shauli, a cop
- Nati Kluger as Eti, a real estate agent
- Kais Nashef as a Man on horse
- Menashe Noy as Rami, Miki's boss
- Rivka Michaeli as Yoram's wife

== Release ==
The film was released in Israel on 15 August 2013 and opened in other theatres at the dates given below.

Region	Release date	Festival or Distributor
U.S.A	21 April 2013	Tribeca Film Festival
U.S.A	4 May 2013	Stanley Film Festival
Canada	26 July 2013	Fantasia International Film Festival
Israel	15 August 2013
UK	26 August 2013	Film4 Frightfest
Germany	27 August 2013	Fantasy Filmfest
USA	11 October 2013	Chicago International Film Festival
Spain	20 October 2013	Sitges Film Festival

=== Critical reception ===
The film has received mostly positive reviews. On review aggregator Rotten Tomatoes, the film holds an approval rating of 75% based on 69 reviews, with an average rating of 7.13/10. The website's critics consensus reads: "With just enough black humor to lighten the disturbing subject matter, Big Bad Wolves is as rewarding as it is challenging." On Metacritic, the film has a weighted average score of 64 out of 100, based on 24 critics, indicating "generally favorable reviews".

Quentin Tarantino called it the best film of 2013.

=== Accolades ===
- Tribeca Film Festival: Official Selection
- Stanley Film Festival: Official Selection
- Saturn Awards: Won – Best International Film

== Soundtrack ==
The music for Big Bad Wolves was written by Israeli-born composer Frank Ilfman, who had previously worked together with the directors on Rabies. The music was recorded at Air Lyndhurst Studios on 23 December 2012 with the London Metropolitan Orchestra conducted by orchestrator Matthew Slater. The score has been released digitally and on CD by MovieScore Media and Kronos Records.

== Remake ==
A Spanish remake of Big Bad Wolves, titled Lobo feroz, was filmed in Cádiz in early 2021. It was directed by Gustavo Hernández Ibañez, with Juma Fodde and Conchi del Río adapting the screenplay, and stars Adriana Ugarte and Javier Gutiérrez. The film was released in theaters in Spain by Filmax on January 27, 2023.
