= María Dueñas (writer) =

Spanish writer and professor

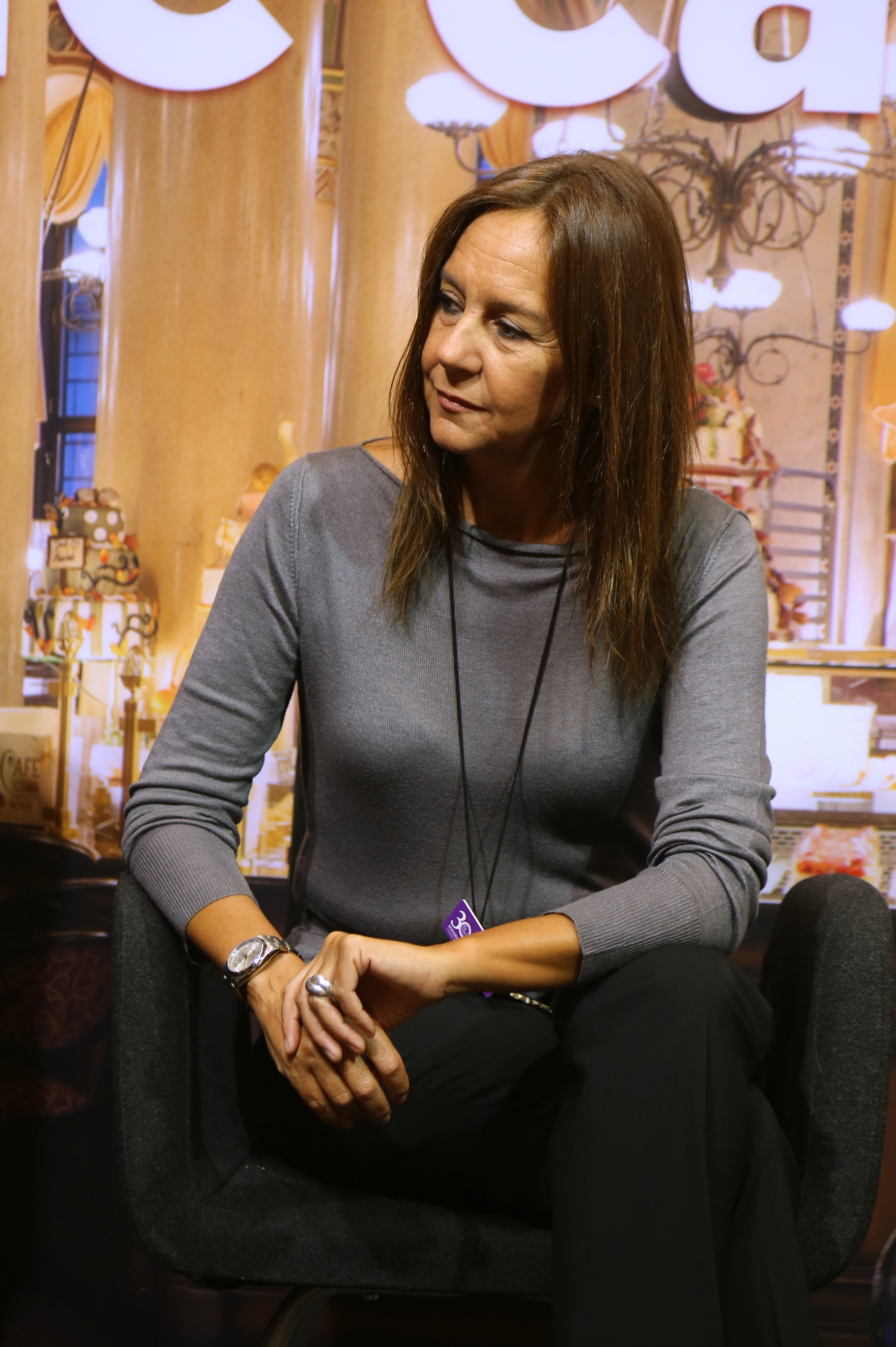
- María Dueñas at Gothenburg book fair 2014.
- Born: 1964 (age 61–62); Puertollano, Ciudad Real, Spain
- Occupations: Novelist, professor
- Writing career
- Genre: Historical novel
- Website: www.mariaduenas.es

María Dueñas Vinuesa (1964) is a Spanish writer and professor. She rose to fame in 2009 with El tiempo entre costuras, her first novel, which became one of the best-selling works of Spanish literature in recent years and has been translated into more than twenty-five languages.

== Life ==
María Dueñas Vinuesa was born in Puertollano in 1964. She earned a licentiate degree in English Philology from the Complutense University of Madrid (UCM) in 1987 and a Master of Arts in Romance and Classical Languages from Michigan State University (MSU) in 1989. She moved to Cartagena in the 1990s. While preparing for her doctoral degree, she worked as teacher at the Military Base of Los Alcázares. She earned a position as senior lecturer at the University of Murcia, where she worked for around two decades. She earned her PhD in English Philology from the University of Murcia in 1997.

Dueñas came into the spotlight in 2009, achieving great success in Spain thanks to her first novel, El tiempo entre costuras, published in English as The Time in Between, and The Seamstress, a historical espionage novel, which sold more than a million copies. It has already been translated into more than 25 different languages. The novel also won a number of literary awards such as the Historical Novel Award from the City of Cartagena and the 2011 Culture Award for Literature. It was adapted for television as a same-titled series, produced by the Spanish television network Antena 3. El tiempo entre costuras revolves around the figure of Sira Quiroga, a seamstress who moves to Morocco with her boyfriend right before the uprising that would lead to the Spanish Civil War. There, after many setbacks, she opens her own sewing workshop.

Dueñas had great success again in 2012 when she published her second novel, Misión Olvido, published in English as The Heart Has Its Reasons. This time the setting goes back and forth between the Spanish missions in California and contemporary Spain. Misión Olvido reached its fifth edition on January 25, 2013 with over half a million copies sold and was awarded the Culture Award for Literature by the Madrid region.

Her third novel, La Templanza, set in 19th century Mexico City, Havana and Jerez de la Frontera, was released in Spain on 17 March 2015. Following the success of the television adaptation of El tiempo entre costuras, Atresmedia announced the production of a television series based on La Templanza. The series, The Vineyard, was released in 2021 by Amazon Prime Video.

In 2018, Dueñas' fourth novel, Las hijas del Capitán was published. The novel is set in early 20th century New York City and focuses on the Spanish immigrants living in the city.

== Published works ==
- The Time in Between or The Seamstress (El tiempo entre costuras) (2009)
- The Heart Has Its Reasons (Misión Olvido) (2012)
- The Vineyard or A Vineyard in Andalusia (La templanza) (2015)
- Las hijas del Capitán (2018)
- Sira (2021)
