= Aharon Keshales =

Israeli filmmaker (born 1976)

- אהרון קשלס
- Born: 16 April 1976 (age 49); Jaffa, Israel
- Occupations: Film director, screenwriter, film critic
- Spouse: Lilach Sonin

Aharon Keshales (Hebrew: אהרון קשלס; born 16 April 1976) is an Israeli film director, screenwriter, and film critic.

== Biography ==
Keshales was born in Jaffa, Israel, to a Sephardic Jewish family. He grew up in Bat Yam, Israel. He served as a soldier in the Intelligence Corps of the Israel Defense Forces. Then studied at the Tel Aviv University's film school, where he later became a lecturer until completing his graduate degree in the interdisciplinary program at the Faculty of Arts.

At the same time, Keshales worked as film critic for Ynet, Globes, and Rating Magazine; and also created the film blog "Piranha Karina".

== Career ==
In 2010, his directorial debut film, Rabies (Kalevet) was released, a film which he co-wrote and co-directed with Navot Papushado. In 2013 their second joint film came out - Big Bad Wolves.

== Filmography (as director) ==
- Rabies (2010, with Navot Papushado)
- Big Bad Wolves (2013, with Navot Papushado)
- ABCs of Death 2 (Segment: F is for Falling) (2014, with Navot Papushado)
- South of Heaven (2021, USA)

== Awards ==
Year	Film	Festival	Award	Category/Recipient(s)	Result
2011	Rabies	Puchon International Fantastic Film Festival	European Fantastic Film Festival Federation Asian Award - Special Mention	Shared with Navot Papushado	Won
2011	Rabies	Fantasporto	Critics' Award	Critics Choice Award; Shared with Navot Papushado	Won
2013	Rabies	Fangoria Chainsaw Awards	Chainsaw Award	Best Screenplay; Shared with Navot Papushado	Nominated
2011	Rabies	Chicago International Film Festival	Gold Hugo	After Dark Competition; Shared with Navot Papushado	Nominated
2013	Big Bad Wolves	Awards of the Israeli Film Academy	Award of the Israeli Film Academy	Best Director; Shared with Navot Papushado	Nominated
2013	Big Bad Wolves	Awards of the Israeli Film Academy	Award of the Israeli Film Academy	Best Screenplay; Shared with Navot Papushado	Nominated
