= Navot Papushado =

Israeli film director and screenwriter

- נבות פפושדו
- Born: 4 March 1980 (age 46); Haifa, Israel
- Occupations: Film director, screenwriter

Navot Papushado (Hebrew: נבות פפושדו; born 4 March 1980) is an Israeli film director and screenwriter.

== Early life ==
Papushado was born in Haifa, Israel. He resided in the northern Galilee community settlement of Yuvalim, Israel.

== Directing career ==
In 2010, his directorial debut film Rabies (Kalevet) was released, a film which he co-wrote and co-directed with Aharon Keshales. In 2013, their second joint film Big Bad Wolves came out.

== Filmography ==
Year	Title	Director	Writer	Producer	Notes
2010	Rabies	Yes	Yes	No	Also editor
2013	Big Bad Wolves	Yes	Yes	No	
2014	F is for Falling	Yes	No	No	Segment of ABCs of Death 2
2021	Gunpowder Milkshake	Yes	Yes	No	
2021	South of Heaven	No	Yes	Yes	
2021	Lobo Feroz	No	Yes	No	

== Awards ==
Year	Title	Festival	Award	Category	Result
2011	Rabies	Puchon International Fantastic Film Festival	European Fantastic Film Festival Federation Asian Award - Special Mention		Won
2011	Rabies	Fantasporto	Critics' Award	Critics Choice Award	Won
2011	Rabies	Fangoria Chainsaw Awards	Chainsaw Award	Best Screenplay	Nominated
2011	Rabies	Chicago International Film Festival	Gold Hugo	After Dark Competition	Nominated
2013	Big Bad Wolves	Awards of the Israeli Film Academy	Award of the Israeli Film Academy	Best Director	Nominated
2013	Big Bad Wolves	Awards of the Israeli Film Academy	Award of the Israeli Film Academy	Best Screenplay	Nominated
