= Fantastic Film Festival =

Fantastic Film Festival may refer to:

- Avoriaz International Fantastic Film Festival, a former film festival in France
- Brussels International Fantastic Film Festival, Belgium
- Bucheon International Fantastic Film Festival, Korea
- Buffalo Dreams Fantastic Film Festival, Buffalo, New York, US
- Fancine Fantastic Film Festival of the University of Málaga
- Festival international du film fantastique de Gérardmer, France
- Imagine Fantastic Film Festival, formerly Amsterdam Fantastic Film Festival, Netherlands
- Lund International Fantastic Film Festival, Sweden
- Maelstrom International Fantastic Film Festival, a former film festival in Seattle, Washington, US
- Neuchâtel International Fantastic Film Festival, Switzerland
- Saskatoon Fantastic Film Festival, Canada
- Sitges International Fantastic Film Festival, Spain
- Strasbourg European Fantastic Film Festival, France
- Yubari International Fantastic Film Festival, on the island of Hokkaido, Japan

== See also ==
- Méliès International Festivals Federation, formerly European Fantastic Film Festivals Federation, a network of film festivals based in Brussels
