= Bulk (film) =

2025 British science fiction film

- Directed by: Ben Wheatley
- Written by: Ben Wheatley
- Produced by: Andy Starke
- Starring: Sam Riley; Alexandra Maria Lara; Noah Taylor; Mark Monero
- Production companies: Film4; Rook Films
- Distributed by: Anti-Worlds Releasing
- Release date: 14 August 2025 (Edinburgh)
- Running time: 90 minutes
- Country: United Kingdom
- Language: English

Bulk (stylised as BULK) is a 2025 independent British science fiction thriller film written and directed by Ben Wheatley, and starring Sam Riley, Alexandra Maria Lara, Mark Monero, and Noah Taylor.

== Cast ==
- Sam Riley as Corey Harlan
- Alexandra Maria Lara as Aclima
- Noah Taylor as Sessler
- Mark Monero as Anton Chambers

== Production ==
The film is from Ben Wheatley and produced by Andy Starke of Rook Films and financed by Film4 for whom the film was executive produced by Ollie Madden and David Kimbangi. The film was shot on camcorders, iPhones, Go Pros and SVHS. Wheatley wrote the credits himself and made models for the film, including helicopters and aeroplanes. The film's music was also composed by Wheatley, under the alias Dave Welder.

The cast includes Sam Riley, Alexandra Maria Lara, Mark Monero, and Noah Taylor.

Speaking to the Empire Film Podcast, Riley said the film was shot over two weeks in a house in Brighton, with all the dialogue recorded post-sync in Berlin, because there wasn't space in the house for a sound crew.

== Release ==
The film premiered at the 78th Edinburgh International Film Festival on 14 August 2025. It also screened at Fantastic Fest, Imagine Film Festival, MOTELX, Beyond Fest, Fantaspoa, and the Sitges Film Festival.

In January and February 2026, the film was screened in cinemas around the UK and the Republic of Ireland on the Narrative is Tyranny tour, with screenings followed by Q&A sessions with Wheatley.

== Reception ==
Guy Lodge for Variety praised the film for having "mischief" and "energy and wit", describing it as a "hybrid of conspiracy thriller, time-bending sci-fi and goofy genre parody".

On review aggregator website Rotten Tomatoes, the film holds an approval rating of 77% based on 13 reviews, with an average rating of 6.1/10.

=== Accolades ===
Year	Award	Category	Recipient(s)	Result	Ref.
2025	Sitges Film Festival	Best Film	Bulk	Nominated	
2025	Strasbourg European Fantastic Film Festival	Crossovers Prize	Bulk	Nominated	
2025	Imagine Film Festival	Méliès d'Argent Award	Bulk	Nominated	
2026	Fantaspoa	Méliès d'Argent Award	Bulk	Nominated	
