= Fantasporto =

International genre film festival in Portugal

- Location: Porto, Portugal
- Founded: 1981
- Founded by: Mário Dorminsky, Beatriz Pacheco Pereira, José Manuel Pereira
- Directors: Mário Dorminsky, Beatriz Pacheco Pereira
- Festival date: Annually in March
- Language: International, Portuguese
- Website: fantasporto.com

Fantasporto International Film Festival (Portuguese: Festival Internacional de Cinema do Porto) is an international film festival, organized annually since 1981. It is hosted in Porto, Portugal.

Fantasporto has gained a cult following. It has built the reputation of a discovery festival, premiering films which have gone on to achieve a cult status.

Fantasporto has been cited as one of the world's most prestigious genre film festivals, being featured in Variety and named one of Dread Central's "Best Horror Festivals in the World" in both 2022 and 2021, as well as one of the "25 Coolest Film Festivals in the World" by MovieMaker in 2023.

== History ==
Fantasporto was founded by Mário Dorminsky, Beatriz Pacheco Pereira and José Manuel Pereira in 1981.

In its 27th edition in February 2006 the festival reached 104,000 people and 5,000 media references, both domestic and international, with a record of 187 hours of TV time. Present in Porto were about 100 members of the foreign press and about 250 Portuguese journalists and media representatives.

In spite of being organized by a private entity, the event is mostly state funded, with the Ministry of Culture of Portugal leading and the President of the Republic as head of the Honour Committee, along with several private sponsors.

The festival is a former member of the European Fantastic Film Festivals Federation.

== Awards ==
- Secção Oficial Cinema Fantástico
  - Grande Prémio Fantasporto – Best Film Award
  - Prémio Especial do Juri – Jury's Special Award
  - Melhor Realização – Best Direction
  - Melhor Actor – Best Actor
  - Melhor Actriz – Best Actress
  - Melhor Argumento – Best Screenplay
  - Melhores Efeitos Especiais – Best Special Effects
  - Melhor Curta-Metragem – Best Short Film
  - Menção do Juri Internacional – Special Mention of the Jury
- Semana dos Realizadores
  - Prémio Melhor Filme Semana dos Realizadores – Directors Week Best Film Award
  - Prémio Especial do Juri – Directors Week Jury’s Special Award
  - Melhor Realização – Directors Week Best Director Award
  - Melhor Actor – Directors Week Best Actor Award
  - Melhor Actriz – Directors Week Best Actress Award
  - Melhor Argumento – Directors Week Best Screenplay Award
  - Menção Especial – Special Mention of the Directors Week Jury
- Prémio do Cinema Português
  - Melhor Filme – Best Portuguese Picture
  - Melhor Escola – Best Portuguese Cinema School
- Non official awards
  - International Fantasy Film Special Jury Award
  - Prémio da Crítica – Critic's Award
  - Prémio do Público – Audience Award
- Prémios Carreira

== Winners ==
=== Grand Prix Fantasporto ===
The Grand Prix Fantasporto (Portuguese: Grande Prémio Fantasporto) is the highest prize awarded at the Fantasporto Film Festival and is presented to the director of the best feature film of the official competition.

Year	Film	Director	Nationality of director (at time of film's release)
1982	The Redeemer	Krsto Papić	*Yugoslavia
1983	Scanners	David Cronenberg	*Canada
1984	The Last Battle	Luc Besson	*France
1985	The Company of Wolves	Neil Jordan	*United Kingdom
1986	Eternal Fire	José Ángel Rebolledo	*Spain
1987	Defense of the Realm	David Drury	United Kingdom
1988	A Chinese Ghost Story	Ching Siu-tung	*Hong Kong
1989	Monkey Shines	George A. Romero	United States
1990	Black Rainbow	Mike Hodges	United Kingdom
1991	Henry: Portrait of a Serial Killer	John McNaughton	United States
1992	Toto the Hero	Jaco van Dormael	*Belgium
1993	Braindead	Peter Jackson	*New Zealand
1994	Cronos	Guillermo del Toro	*Mexico
1995	Shallow Grave	Danny Boyle	United Kingdom
1996	Seven	David Fincher	United States
1997	Bound	The Wachowskis (Note: Credited as The Wachowski Brothers.)	United States
1998	Retroactive	Louis Morneau	United States
1999	Cube	Vincenzo Natali	*Canada
2000	Siam Sunset	John Polson	*Australia
2001	Amores perros	Alejandro González Iñárritu	Mexico
2002	Fausto 5.0	La Fura dels Baus	Spain
2003	Intacto	Juan Carlos Fresnadillo	Spain
2004	A Tale of Two Sisters	Kim Jee-woon	*South Korea
2005	Nothing	Vincenzo Natali	Canada
2006	Frostbiten	Anders Banke	*Sweden
2007	Pan's Labyrinth	Guillermo del Toro	Mexico
2008	REC	Jaume Balagueró & Paco Plaza	Spain
2009	Idiots and Angels	Bill Plympton	United States
2010	Heartless	Philip Ridley	United Kingdom
2011	Two Eyes Staring	Elbert van Strien	*Netherlands
2012	Hell	Tim Fehlbaum	*Germany
2013	Mama	Andy Muschietti	Spain / Canada
2014	Miss Zombie	Sabu	*Japan
2015	Liza, the Fox-Fairy	Károly Ujj Mészáros	*Hungary
2016	The Lure	Agnieszka Smoczynska	*Poland
2017	Realive	Mateo Gil	Spain
2018	Ravenous	Robin Aubert	Canada
2019	Last Sunrise	Wen Ren	China
2020	Ghost Master	Paul Young	Japan
2021	Suicide Forest Village	Takashi Shimizu	Japan
2022	Follow Her	Sylvia Caminer	United States
2023	Once Upon a Time in the Future: 2121	Serpil Altin	Turkey
2024	From the End of the World	Kazuaki Kiriya	Japan
2025	Dollhouse	Shinobu Yaguchi	Japan
2026	The Dollmaker	José María Cicala	*Argentina

*_{denotes first win}

Multiple award winners

- (Canada) Vincenzo Natali (1999, 2005)
- (Mexico) Guillermo del Toro (1994, 2007)

=== Best Actor ===
The Best Actor Award (Portuguese: Melhor Actor) is an award presented at Fantasporto. It is chosen by the jury from the films in the official selection. It was first awarded in 1982.

Year	Actor	Film
1982	(Spain) Eusebio Poncela	Arrebato
1983	(Croatia) Fabijan Šovagović	Ritam zločina
1984	(United States) Vincent Price	For their contributions to the fantastic film genre.
1984	(United Kingdom) Peter Cushing	For their contributions to the fantastic film genre.
1984	(United Kingdom) Christopher Lee	For their contributions to the fantastic film genre.
1984	(United States) John Carradine	For their contributions to the fantastic film genre.
1985	(United Kingdom) John Hurt	Nineteen Eighty-Four
1985	(France) Eddy Mitchell	Frankenstein 90
1986	(United Kingdom) Ian Holm	Dreamchild
1987	(Republic of Ireland) Gabriel Byrne	Gothic
1987	(Republic of Ireland) Gabriel Byrne	Defence of the Realm
1988	(Netherlands) Jim van der Woude	De Wisselwachter
1989	(United Kingdom) Jeremy Irons	Dead Ringers
1990	(France) Bernard-Pierre Donnadieu	Spoorloos
1991	(United States) Michael Rooker	Henry: Portrait of a Serial Killer
1992	(United States) Jeff Daniels	Timescape
1993	(United States) Harvey Keitel	Bad Lieutenant
1994	(Argentina) Federico Luppi	Cronos
1995	(Spain) Karra Elejalde	La Madre Muerta
1996	(United Kingdom) Rupert Everett	Cemetery Man
1997	(Spain) Juan Inciarte	Sólo se muere dos veces
1998	(Spain) Nancho Novo	Dame algo
1999	(United Kingdom) Kevin McKidd	The Acid House
1999	(United Kingdom) Gary McCormack	The Acid House
2000	(United Kingdom) Tom Fisher	The Nine Lives of Tomas Katz
2000	(Ukraine) Konstantin Prochorowski	Holgi
2001	(United States) Willem Dafoe	Shadow of the Vampire
2002	(Spain) Eduard Fernández	Fausto 5.0
2002	(Argentina) Miguel Ángel Solá	Fausto 5.0
2003	(United Kingdom) Jeremy Northam	Cypher
2004	(Argentina) Darío Grandinetti	Palabras encadenadas
2005	(United States) Bruce Campbell	Bubba Ho-Tep
2006	(Spain) Jaume García Arija	Zulo
2007	(Spain) Sergi López	Pan's Labyrinth
2008	(United States) Mark Borkowski	The Ungodly
2009	(United Kingdom) Jack O'Connell	Eden Lake
2010	(United Kingdom) Jim Sturgess	Heartless
2011	(Germany) Axel Wedekind	Iron Doors
2012	(Spain) Alexis Diaz de Villegas	Juan of the Dead
2013	(United Kingdom) Toby Jones	Berberian Sound Studio
2014	(Israel) Duval'e Glickman	Big Bad Wolves
2015	(United Kingdom) Rupert Evans	The Canal
2016	(Japan) Kenichi Matsuyama	Chasuke's Journey
2017	(United States) Frederick Koehler	The Evil Within
2018	(Philippines) Ian Veneracion	Ilawod
2019	(Norway) Christopher Rygh	The Head Hunter
2020	(Sweden) Leif Edlund	Koko-di Koko-da
2021	(United Kingdom) James D'Arcy	LX 2048
2022	(Hungary) László Attila Horváth	SoulPark
2023	(Hungary) Zsolt Nagy	A játszma
2024	(India) Tovino Thomas	Invisible Windows
2025	(United States) Brendan Bradley	Succubus
2026	(Argentina) Rodrigo Noya	The Dollmaker

=== Best Actress ===
The Best Actress Award (Portuguese: Melhor Atriz) is an award presented at Fantasporto. It is chosen by the jury from the films in the official selection. It was first awarded in 1982.

Year	Actress	Film
1982	(United Kingdom) Julie Christie	Memoirs of a Survivor
1983	(France) Isabelle Adjani	Possession
1984	(France) Anny Duperey	Le Démon dans l'île
1985	(Colombia) Adriana Herrán	Carne de tu carne
1986	(Italy) Domiziana Giordano	Zina
1987	(Spain) Julieta Serrano	Matador
1988	(United Kingdom) Charlotte Rampling	Mascara
1989	(United Kingdom) Charlotte Burke	Paperhouse
1990	(United States) Rosanna Arquette	Black Rainbow
1991	(United States) Tracy Arnold	Henry: Portrait of a Serial Killer
1991	(United Kingdom) Billie Whitelaw	The Krays
1992	(United Kingdom) Juliet Stevenson	Truly, Madly, Deeply
1993	(Mexico) Evangelina Sosa	Ángel de Fuego
1994	(New Zealand) Sarah Smuts-Kennedy	Jack Be Nimble
1995	(New Zealand) Rena Owen	Once Were Warriors
1996	(United Kingdom) Helena Bonham Carter	Margaret's Museum
1997	(United States) Jennifer Tilly	Bound
1998	(New Zealand) Rebecca Hobbs	The Ugly
1999	(Denmark) Sofie Gråbøl	Credo
2000	(New Zealand) Danielle Cormack	Siam Sunset
2001	(South Korea) Suh Jung	The Isle
2002	(South Korea) Jang Jin-young	Sorum
2003	(Japan) Asuka Kurosawa	Rokugatsu no hebi
2004	(South Korea) Im Soo-jung	A Tale of Two Sisters
2005	(United States) Karen Black	Firecracker
2006	(Hungary) Orsolya Tóth	Johanna
2007	(Spain) Ariadna Gil	Ausentes
2008	(Spain) Belén Rueda	El orfanato
2009	(India) Mamatha Bhukya	Vanaja
2010	(United Kingdom) Neve McIntosh	Salvage
2011	(South Korea) Seo Young-hee	Bedevilled
2012	(Germany) Hannah Herzsprung	Hell
2013	(United States) Jessica Chastain	Mama
2014	(United Kingdom) Anna Walton	Soulmate
2015	(United Kingdom) Georgia Bradley	Hungerford
2016	(Philippines) Barbie Forteza	Laut
2017	(Republic of Ireland) Catherine Walker	A Dark Song
2018	(Canada) Jessica McLeod	The Hollow Child
2019	(Australia) Georgia Chara	Living Space
2020	(Philippines) Cristine Reyes	UnTrue
2021	(Netherlands) Thekla Reuten	Marionette
2022	(Canada) Dani Barker	Follow Her
2023	(Netherlands) Thekla Reuten	Narcosis
2024	(Canada) Eve Ringuette	Jour de Merde
2025	(Philippines) Judy Ann Santos	Espantaho
2026	(Spain) Maribel Verdú	Under Your Feet

=== Best Screenplay ===
The Best Screenplay Award (Portuguese: Melhor Argumento) is an award presented at Fantasporto. It is chosen by the jury from the films in the official selection.

Year	Writer	Film
2012	Alejandro Brugués	(Spain) Juan of the Dead
2013	Alex Schmidt	(Germany) Forgotten
2014	Yeon Sang-ho	(South Korea) The Fake
2015	Jong-ho Lee	(South Korea) Mourning Grave
2016	Sabu	(Japan) Chasuke's Journey
2017	Mateo Gil	(Spain) Realive
2018	Shin Su-won	(South Korea) Glass Garden
2019	Rodrigo Aragão	(Brazil) A Mata Negra
2020	Chris Bavota & Lee Paula Springer	(Canada) Dead Dicks
2021	Gábor Hellebrandt & Péter Bergendy	(Hungary) Post Mortem
2022	Rick Ostermann & Patrick Brunken & Dirk Kurbjuweit	(Germany) Das Haus
2023	Norbert Köbli	(Hungary) A játszma
2024	Sébastien Drouin	(France) Cold Meat
2025	Yugo Sakamoto	(Japan) Ghost Killer
2026	Gustavo Hernández Ibañez	(Uruguay) The Whisper

== See also ==
- List of fantastic and horror film festivals
- European Fantastic Film Festivals Federation
- MOTELx
