= Anne Billson =

English writer, photographer, and film critic (born 1954)

Anne Billson (born 1954) is a writer, photographer, and film critic who was born in Southport, England. Her fiction is characterized by the combination of horror with satire and includes the novels Suckers (1993), Stiff Lips (1997), The Ex (2012), The Coming Thing (2017) and The Half Man (2019). In 2019, she self-published a fantasy novel, Blood Pearl. Granta named Billson one of the "Best Young British Novelists" in 1993.

Billson was the film critic of The Sunday Telegraph (1992–2001), The Sunday Correspondent (1989-1990), and Today (1986). She has written film reviews for Time Out, Tatler (1989–90), and the New Statesman & Society (1991–92). Billson has written several volumes of nonfiction, including monographs on movies such as John Carpenter's The Thing and Tomas Alfredson's Let the Right One In. Her 2017 book Cats on Film claims to be "the definitive work of feline film scholarship."

In 2015, she was chosen by the British Film Institute as one of “25 Female Film Critics Worth Celebrating.” She has lived in London, Tokyo, Paris, Croydon and Brussels, and now lives in Antwerp. She is a programmer and presenter at Offscreen Film Festival in Brussels.
