= Dead by Dawn (film festival) =

Independent film festival in Scotland

Dead by Dawn, Scotland's International Horror Film Festival
- Location: Edinburgh, Scotland
- Founded: 1993
- Language: International
- Website: deadbydawn.co.uk

Dead by Dawn is an independent horror film festival in Edinburgh, Scotland. Established in 1993 by Adele Hartley, it showcases independent films, short films and feature films. The festival was a former member of the European Fantastic Film Festivals Federation and occurs annually, usually in late-April.

It was at one stage "UK’s longest running genre film festival", until cancellation due to the COVID-19 pandemic and the closure, and subsequent reopening, of Edinburgh Filmhouse. The festival will return in April 2027.

== History ==
1993

The Guest of Honour was Ramsey Campbell.

The very first Dead by Dawn opened with Murnau's NOSFERATU with live piano accompaniment, followed by VIDEODROME and the UK Premieres of INNOCENT BLOOD (John Landis), MEET THE FEEBLES (Peter Jackson) and BRAINDEAD (Peter Jackson).

1994

Mariano Baino was the Guest of Honour for the World Premiere of DARK WATERS.

An all-night movie marathon screened THE HAUNTING, Caruncula, DARK WATERS, BAD TASTE and UK Premieres of both BODY SNATCHERS (Abel Ferrara) and NECRONOMICON (Christophe Gans, Shûsuke Kaneko, Brian Yuzna).

1995

Doug Bradley was the Guest of Honour.

An all-night movie marathon screened HOUSE BY THE CEMETERY, THE THING, TENEBRE, CARNIVAL OF SOULS and BEG.

1999

The guests included Jean Rollin hosting the UK Premiere of LITTLE ORPHAN VAMPIRES, Richard Stanley hosting retrospective screenings of DUST DEVIL (uncut) and HARDWARE, and Loris Curci presenting a retrospective screening of LIZARD IN A WOMAN'S SKIN.

UK Premieres included THE FACULTY (Robert Rodriguez), PROGENY (Brian Yuzna) and LONG TWILIGHT (Attila Janisch).

The festival did not run in 1996, 1997 or 1998.

2000

The festival hosted the World Premiere of LIGHTHOUSE, with director Simon Hunter attending.

Guests also in attendance were Kier-la Janisse hosting a retrospective double bill of BIRD WITH THE CRYSTAL PLUMAGE and BLOOD AND BLACK LACE. Shaky Gonzales attended to host the UK Premiere of ANGEL OF THE NIGHT and Allan Brown attended to host a retrospective screening of THE WICKER MAN.

UK Premieres included THE LAST BROADCAST (Stefan Avalos, Lance Weiler), LA FIANCEE DE DRACULA (Jean Rollin), PITCH BLACK (David Twohy), ANGEL OF THE NIGHT, PHANTOM OF THE OPERA (Dario Argento) and SCREAM 3 (Wes Craven).

2001

The festival hosted the World Premiere of ATTIC EXPEDITIONS with director Jeremy Kasten and producer Dan Gold in attending.

Brian Yuzna was in attendance for the UK Premiere of FAUST.

UK Premieres included LOS SIN NOMBRE aka THE NAMELESS (Jaume Balaguero), HYPNOSIS (Masayuki Ochiai), ATTIC EXPEDITIONS, UZUMAKI (Higuchinsky), BLOOD: THE LAST VAMPIRE (Hiroyuki Kitakubo), PREMUTOS (Olaf Ittenbach) and FAUST.

2002

The festival hosted the World Premiere of ONE HELL OF A CHRISTMAS, with director Shaky Gonzales in attendance.

Herschell Gordon Lewis was in attendance for the UK Premiere of BLOOD FEAST 2: ALL YOU CAN EAT.

UK Premieres included PYROKINESIS (Shûsuke Kaneko), DAGON (Stuart Gordon), A LIVING HELL (Shugo Fujii), THE CONVENT (Mike Mendez), NON HO SONNO aka SLEEPLESS (Dario Argento), ST JOHN'S WORT (Ten Shimoyama) and DOG SOLDIERS (Neil Marshall).

2003

Robert Englund was the Guest of Honour for a retrospective screening of A NIGHTMARE ON ELM ST.

Also in attendance were Neil Marshall and Keith Bell.

UK Premieres included SOFT FOR DIGGING (JT Petty), SANGRE ETERNA (Jorge Olguin), MAY (Lucky McKee), BEYOND RE-ANIMATOR (Brian Yuzna), GARDEN OF LOVE (Olaf Ittenbach), PLAGA ZOMBIE: ZONA MUTANTE (Pablo Parés, Hernán Sáez), MUCHA SANGRE (Pepe de la Heras), THR3E (Peter Ho-Sun Chan, Kim Jee-woon, Nonzee Nimibutr), UNDEAD (Michael Spierig, Peter Spierig) and BUBBA HO-TEP (Don Coscarelli).

2004

Claudio Simonetti was the Guest of Honour, playing live accompaniment to the UK Premiere of IL CARTAIO.

The festival hosted the World Premiere of SHALLOW GROUND (Sheldon Wilson), with Sheldon, Steve London, Bill Mendel, Martin Mathieu attending. Also in attendance were Matt Leutwyler and Erik Palladino for the UK Premiere of DEAD & BREAKFAST.

The Audience Award for Best Feature was won by SHALLOW GROUND. The Audience Award for Best Short went to WARD 13 (Peter Cornwell) and The Cutting Edge Short Film Competition was won by BURIED (Tim Bullock).

UK Premieres included HAUTE TENSION aka SWITCHBLADE ROMANCE (Alexandre Aja), IL CARTAIO aka THE CARD PLAYER (Dario Argento), LOST THINGS (Martin Murphy), DEAD & BREAKFAST, MONSTER MAN (Michael Davis), UNA DE ZOMBIS (Miguel Ángel Lamata), ONE POINT 0 (Jeff Renfroe, Marteinn Thorsson), THE BIG SLAUGHTER CLUB (Hitoshi Ishikawa) and THE TOOLBOX MURDERS (Tobe Hooper).

2005

Ken Foree was the Guest of Honour for a retrospective screening of DAWN OF THE DEAD.

The festival hosted the World Premiere of BLOODSHED (Jim McMahon), attended by cast and crew.

Rob Morgan was in attendance for retrospective screenings of THE MAN IN THE LOWER LEFT HAND CORNER OF THE PHOTOGRAPH, THE CAT WITH HANDS, THE SEPARATION and MONSTERS.

Sam Walker was in attendance for retrospective screenings of DUCK CHILDREN, POOL SHARK and TEA BREAK.

Neil Marshall attended to screen a preview trailer for THE DESCENT before our premiere screening later in the year.

The Audience Award for Best Feature was won by THE DARK HOURS (Paul Fox). The Audience Award for Best Short went to THE TEN STEPS (Brendan Muldowney) and The Cutting Edge Short Film Competition was won by THE FRENCH DOORS (Steve Tyson).

UK Premieres included DEAD MEAT (Conor McMahon), GUSHER NO BINDS ME (Hiroki Yamaguchi), OCCHI DI CRISTALLO (Eros Puglielli), THE UNINVITED (Soo-youn Lee), THREE...EXTREMES (Park Chan-wook, Fruit Chan, Takashi Miike), NIGHT OF THE LIVING DORKS (Matthias Dinter), SATAN’S LITTLE HELPER (Jeff Lieberman), DO YOU LIKE HITCHCOCK? (Dario Argento), KILLING WORDS (Laura Mañá), THE DARK HOURS and DEAD BIRDS (Alex Turner).

2006

The festival hosted the launch of the READ BY DAWN collection of short horror stories.

Tony Todd was the Guest of Honour for MINOTAUR and SHADOW: DEAD RIOT (Derek Wan).

Also in attendance were the team behind WORST CASE SCENARIO, cast and crew for the UK Premiere of BLOOD TRAILS.

The Audience Award for Best Feature was won jointly by BROKEN (Adam Mason, Simon Boyes) and BLOOD TRAILS (Robert Krause). The Audience Award for Best Short went to OCULUS (Mike Flanagan) and The Cutting Edge Short Film Competition was won by LOS OJOS DE ALICIA (Hugo Sanz).

UK Premieres included HARD CANDY (David Slade), HAZE (Shinya Tsukamoto), THE LAST SUPPER (Osamu Fukutani), MINOTAUR (Jonathan English), THE GHOST WITHIN, BLOOD TRAILS, BROKEN, ISOLATION (Billy O'Brien), ZOMBIE JIETAI (Tomomatsu Naoyuki), NEIGHBORHOOD WATCH (Graeme Whifler) and SEVERED (Carl Bessai).

2007

Alex de la Iglesia was the Guest of Honour for the UK Premiere of THE BABY'S ROOM.

Also in attendance was Mark Young for the UK Premiere of SOUTHERN GOTHIC.

The Audience Award for Best Feature was won by END OF THE LINE (Maurice Devereaux). The Audience Award for Best Short went to MONSTER (Jennifer Kent) and The Cutting Edge Short Film Competition was won by THE FIFTH (Ryan Levin).

UK Premieres included MULBERRY STREET (Jim Mickle), FLIGHT OF THE LIVING DEAD (Scott Thomas), SHUTTER (Banjong Pisanthanakun, Parkpoom Wongpoom), SOUTHERN GOTHIC, END OF THE LINE, GRUESOME (Joshua Crook, Jeffrey Crook), THE HAMILTONS (The Butcher Brothers), THE BACKWOODS (Koldo Serra), LA HORA FRIA aka THE COLD HOUR (Elio Quiroga), TO LET (Jaume Balagueró) and THE ABANDONED (Nacho Cerdà).

2008

Guests included Neil Marshall for DOOMSDAY.

Also in attendance were cast and crew of FIVE ACROSS THE EYES and cast and crew of THE VANGUARD.

The Audience Award for Best Feature was won by STUCK (Stuart Gordon). The Audience Award for Best Short went to SPIDER (Nash Edgerton) and The Cutting Edge Short Film Competition was won by CRITICIZED (Richard Gale).

UK Premieres included OUTPOST (Steve Barker), FIVE ACROSS THE EYES (Greg Swinson, Ryan Thiessen), DEATH NOTE (Shusuke Kaneko), SUICIDE CLUB (Sion Sono), THE MIST (Frank Darabont), THE VANGUARD (Matthew Hope), MACHINE GIRL (Noboru Iguchi), SENSELESS (Simon Hynd), WIZARD OF GORE (Jeremy Kasten), MOTHER OF TEARS (Dario Argento) and STUCK.

2009

Fred Dekker was Guest of Honour for a retrospective screening of NIGHT OF THE CREEPS. Also in attendance were Ian McCulloch for ZOMBIE FLESH EATERS, COLD STORAGE + Tony Elwood and Paul Barrett for COLD STORAGE.

The Audience Award for Best Feature was won by COLD STORAGE. The Audience Award for Best Short went to NEXT FLOOR (Denis Villeneuve) and The Cutting Edge Short Film Competition was won by KIRKSDALE (Ryan Spindell).

UK Premieres included BLOOD RIVER (Adam Mason), THE FORBIDDEN DOOR (Joko Anwar), TAMAMI: THE BABY’S CURSE (Yûdai Yamaguchi), DAWNING (Gregg Holtgrewe) and HOME MOVIE (Christopher Denham).

2010

This year's festival was a one day Un-Hallowe'en Special.

The Audience Award for Best Feature was won by 5150, RUE DES ORMES (Eric Tessier). The Audience Award for Best Short was won jointly by DANSE MACABRE (Pedro Pires) and TUFTY (Brendan Butler, Jason Butler).

UK Premieres included THE DIRECTOR’S CUT (Paul Komadina), CROPSEY (Barbara Brancaccio, Joshua Zeman), 5150, RUE DES ORMES, RED VELVET (Bruce Dickson) and THE BOOK OF ZOMBIE (Paul Cranefield, Scott Kragelund).

2011

Guests included Keith Wright for HAROLD'S GOING STIFF and Alex Appel for THE DEATH OF ALICE BLUE

The Audience Award for Best Feature was won jointly by HAROLD’S GOING STIFF and STAKE LAND (Jim Mickle). The Audience Award for Best Short went to THE LIVING WANT ME DEAD (Bill Palmer) and The Audience Award for Best Animated Short was won by HUNGRY HICKORY (Damian McCarthy). The Cutting Edge Short Film Competition was won by VICENTA (Sam Orti).

UK Premieres include LOS OJOS DE JULIA (Guillem Morales), HAROLD’S GOING STIFF, THE DEATH OF ALICE BLUE (Park Bench), COLD FISH (Sion Sono), STAKE LAND, THE NEIGHBOR ZOMBIE (Young-Geun Hong, Hoon Ryoo, Oh Young-Doo), DER LETZTE ANGESTELLTE (Alexander Adolph), CHOP (Trent Haaga), BABY SHOWER (Pablo Illanes), THE AFFLICTED (Jason Stoddard), YELLOWBRICKROAD (Jesse Holland, Andy Mitton) and TUCKER & DALE VS EVIL (Eli Craig).

2012

Juan Martinez Moreno was the Guest of Honour for the UK Premiere of LOBOS DE ARGA

Also in attendance were Signe Olynyk and Bob Schultz for the UK Premiere of BELOW ZERO.

The Audience Award for Best Feature was won by LOBOS DE ARGA. The Audience Award for Best Short went to MURDERABILIA (David Matthews) and The Audience Award for Best Animated Short was won by THE EXTERNAL WORLD (David O'Reilly, Vernon Chatman). The Cutting Edge Short Film Competition was won by THE COLDEST CALLER (joe Tucker).

UK Premieres included THE FIELDS (Tom Mattera, David Mazzoni), RED TEARS aka MONSTER KILLER (Takanori Tsujimoto), BELOW ZERO, THE PUPPET MONSTER MASSACRE (Dustin Mills), NIGHTMARE FACTORY (Donna Davies), LOBOS DE ARGA, JUAN DE LOS MUERTOS (Alejandro Brugues), MACABRE (The Mo Brothers), RED NIGHTS (Julien Carbon, Laurent Courtiaud), HAUNTERS (Min-suk Kim) and THE CABIN IN THE WOODS (Drew Goddard).

2013

Frank Hennenlotter was the Guest of Honour for a retrospective, screenings included BASKET CASE and BRAIN DAMAGE.

Also in attendance were Jeremy Gardner and Adam Cronheim for THE BATTERY.

The Audience Award for Best Feature was won by THE BATTERY. The Audience Award for Best Short went to FIST OF JESUS (Adrián Cardona, David Muñoz).

UK Premieres included JUG FACE (Chad Crawford Kinkle), MODUS ANOMALI (Joko Anwar), ABDUCTEE (Yûdai Yamaguchi), THE BATTERY, DEAD SHADOWS (David Cholewa), BIG ASS SPIDER! (Mike Mendez), ZOMVIDEO (Kenji Murakami), MY AMITYVILLE HORROR (Eric Walter), MON AMI (Rob Grant) and THE LAST WILL AND TESTAMENT OF ROSALIND LEIGH (Rodrigo Gudino).

2014

Kier-la Janisse was Guest of Honour, presenting SCHOOL OF SHOCK.

The Audience Award for Best Feature was won by HOUSEBOUND (Gerard Johnstone). The Audience Award for Best Short went to FOOL’S DAY (Cody Blue Snider) and The Audience Award for Best Animation was won by MALARIA (Edson Oda).

UK Premieres included 13 SINS (Daniel Stamm), AU NOM DU FILS aka IN THE NAME OF THE SON (Vincent Lannoo), CHOCOLATE STRAWBERRY VANILLA (Stuart Simpson), DEAD BANGING (Eiji Uchida), HOUSEBOUND, KILLER LEGENDS (Joshua Zeman), LES GOUFFRES aka THE SINKHOLES (Antoine Barraud), LESSON OF EVIL (Takashi Miike) and OCULUS (Mike Flanagan).

2015

Guests included Chris W Mitchell and Jan Doense for DE POEL aka THE POOL, and David Ferino for short film Emptied.

The Audience Award for Best Feature was won by MUSARANAS aka SHREW’S NEST (Juanfer Andrés, Esteban Roel). The Audience Award for Best Short went to RAT PACK RAT (Todd Rohal) and The Audience Award for Best Animation was won by DAY 40 (Sol Friedman).

2016

Guests included Dan Pringle and Adam Merrifield for K-SHOP; Gareth Bryn, Ed Talfan and Dyfan Dwyfor for YR YMADAWIAD aka THE PASSING.

The Audience Award for Best Feature was won by WE GO ON (Jesse Holland, Andy Mitton). The Audience Award for Best Short went to THE BABYSITTER MURDERS (Ryan Spindle) and The Audience Award for Best Animation OTHER LILY (David Romero).

The festival hosted the World Premiere of K-SHOP. UK Premieres included DECAY (Joseph Wartnerchaney), DER BUNKER (Nikias Chryssos), ANTIBIRTH (Danny Perez) and SHE WHO MUST BURN (Larry Kent). Scottish Premieres included YR YMADAWIAD aka THE PASSING, ASTRAEA (Kristjan Thor), THE CORPSE OF ANNA FRITZ (Hèctor Hernández Vicens) and SORGENFRI aka WHAT WE BECOME (Bo Mikkelsen).

2017

Guests included Daniel Falicki for ACCIDENTAL EXORCIST, Hunter Adams for DIG TWO GRAVES and Michael Luceri for THE EVIL WITHIN.

The Audience Award for Best Feature went to DIG TWO GRAVES. The Audience Award for Best Short was won by MADAM BLACK (Ivan Barge) and The Audience Award for Best Animation was won by the Oscar-nominated GARDEN PARTY (Florian Babikian, Vincent Bayoux, Victor Caire, Théophile Dufresne, Gabriel Grapperon, Lucas Navarro)

UK Premieres included THE EVIL WITHIN (Andrew Getty), THE NIGHT WATCHMEN (Mitchell Altieri), ACCIDENTAL EXORCIST, DIG TWO GRAVES and DRY BLOOD (Kelton Jones). Scottish Premieres included WITHOUT NAME (Lorcan Finnegan), ALWAYS SHINE (Sophia Takal) and THE VOID (Jeremy Gillespie, Steven Kostanski).

2018

John Landis was Guest of Honour for a retrospective, screenings included AN AMERICAN WEREWOLF IN LONDON and INNOCENT BLOOD.

Also in attendance were Michael Peterson for KNUCKLEBALL, Samuel Goodwin for short film Homesick and Annabel de Vetten Petersen of The Conjurer’s Kitchen.

The Audience Award for Best Feature went to DAVE MADE A MAZE (Bill Watterson). The Audience Award for Best Short was won by The Mother Situation (Matt Day) and The Audience Award for Best Animation went to LA MORT, PERE ET FILS aka THE DEATH, DAD AND SON (Vincent Paronnaud, Denis Walgenwitz).

UK Premieres included SIEMBAMBA aka THE LULLABY (Darrell Roodt), KNUCKLEBALL (Michael Peterson) and AJ ZOMBIES! (Daniel Martín Rodríguez). Scottish Premieres included RABBIT (Luke Shanahan), TRENCH 11 (Leo Scherman), SPOOKERS (Florian Habicht), DAVE MADE A MAZE, MON MON MON MONSTERS (Giddens Ko) and DOWNRANGE (Ryuhei Kitamura).

2019

Jeff Lieberman was Guest of Honour for a retrospective, screenings included BLUE SUNSHINE, SATAN'S LITTLE HELPER and SQUIRM.

Also in attendance were Max Isaacson for short film Pipe; Chris Cronin, Sam Cronin, & Paul Bullion for short film Oscar's Bell and Adrian Hedgecock for short film Pleased to Eat You!

The Audience Award for Best Feature went to TOUS LES DIEUX DU CIEL (Quarxx). The Audience Award for Best Short was won jointly by Dead Birds (Johnny Kenton) and Oscar's Bell. The Audience Award for Best Animation went to La Noria (Carlos Baena).

UK Premieres included INCREDIBLE VIOLENCE (G Patrick Condon), HEAVY TRIP (Jusso Laatio, Jukka Vidgren) and CUTTERHEAD (Rasmus Kloster Bro).

2020

The festival was scheduled to run in late April 2020 but was cancelled in late March at the onset of the Covid-19 Pandemic.

2023

The festival was scheduled to return in late April 2023 but in October of 2022, Filmhouse in Edinburgh was put into administration. A new management team campaigned and fundraised for two and a half years for the cinema to be reopened in June 2025.

2027

Dead by Dawn, Scotland's International Horror Film Festival, is scheduled to return to Filmhouse, Edinburgh from April 21 - 25, 2027.

== See also ==
- European Fantastic Film Festivals Federation
- List of fantastic and horror film festivals
