= Luz (2019 film) =

2019 film

Luz: The Flower of Evil
- Directed by: Juan Diego Escobar Alzate
- Written by: Juan Diego Escobar Alzate
- Produced by: Juan Diego Escobar Alzate; Andrés Gómez
- Starring: Yuri Vargas; Jim Muñoz; Conrado Osorio; Andrea Esquivel; Sharon Guzmán; Johan Alexander Camacho
- Cinematography: Nicolás Caballero
- Edited by: Juan Diego Escobar Alzate, Luis Vanegas
- Music by: Brian Heater
- Production companies: Afasia Films; Egerton Crescent Productions
- Distributed by: Shudder, BFI, Raven Banner, Fractured Visions, Njuta Films, Dark Sky Films, Freaks ON, Le Chat Qui Fume
- Release date: 7 October 2019 (Sitges Film Festival)
- Running time: 104 minutes
- Country: Colombia
- Language: Spanish

Luz also known as Luz: The Flower of Evil or Luz, la flor del mal is a 2019 fantasy-western horror film written and directed by Juan Diego Escobar Alzate, featuring Yuri Vargas in the lead role. In October 2019, it was a contender in the Official Fantastic Competition at the SITGES Fantastic Film Festival in Spain. The film gained international recognition as it was part of numerous international film festivals, including the Glasgow Film Festival, Indiecork, Nocturna Madrid, Almería Western Film Festival, Horrible Imaginings, Fantaspoa, Insólito and Buenos Aires Rojo Sangre, among others. It garnered accolades for Best Iberoamerican Film, Best Photography, Best Editing, and Best Acting at various festivals. 'Luz: The Flower of Evil' also clinched the prestigious Silver Skull Award at Mórbido Fest in Mexico, marking its Latin American Premiere.

With over 68 official selections at international film festivals, the movie secured 24 awards out of more than 40 nominations. It also received a nomination for Best Supporting Actress (Sharon Guzmán) at the Colombian Premios Macondo. Additionally, it was a finalist for the title of Best Latin American Fantastic Film of 2019 by the Meliés Federation.

== Plot ==
In the mountains, a preacher known as "The Lord" begins to lose credibility after promising the naïve inhabitants that he would invoke some kind of god in childlike form. However, the appearance of two enigmatic characters will challenge the true meaning of faith.

== Cast ==
- Yuri Vargas as Uma
- Conrado Osorio as The Lord
- Jim Muñoz as Adam
- Daniel Páez as Elias
- Johan Camacho as Jesus
- Sharon Guzman as Zion
- Andrea Esquivel as Laila

== Festival honors ==
- SITGES Fantastic Film Festival 2019, Official Fantastic Competition World Premiere
- Mórbido Fest 2019, Mexico (Winner SILVER SKULL Best latinamerican film) Latin Premiere
- Buenos Aires Rojo Sangre 2019, Argentina (Winner for best Iberoamerican film, Best Photography, Best editing, Best acting for Yuri Vargas)
- Meliés D'or Latinoamerica 2019, Argentina (Nominee Best Film of the Year 2019)
- Buffalo Dreams, US 2020 (Winner Best Film, Best Director, Best Actor for Conrado Osorio)
- Horrible Imaginings, US 2020 (Winner Best Film, Best Director, Best Cinematography, Best Actor for Conrado Osorio)
- Ravenna Nightmare Film Festival 2020, Italy - Special Mention Best Director
- Nocturna Madrid 2019, Spain (Sección Oficial en Competencia)
- Almería Western Film Festival 2019, Spain (Sección Oficial en Competencia)
- Buenos Aires Rojo Sangre 2019, Argentina (Ganadora Mejor película Iberoamericana, Mejor Fotografía, Mejor Montaje, Mejor Actuación por Yuri Vargas)
- Montevideo Fantástico 2019, Uruguay (Película en Competencia)
- Blood Window Screenings 2019, Argentina (Screenings)
- Meliés D'or Latinamerica 2019, Argentina (Nominado a Mejor película fantástica del año)
- NOX Film Fest, Uruguay (Sección Oficial en Competencia)
- INSÓLITO Fest 2020, Perú (Sección Oficial en Competencia)
- Glasgow Film Festival 2020, Scotland (Sección Oficial en Competencia) Premiere Reino Unido
- Fantaspoa 2020, Brazil (Sección Oficial en Competencia)
- SOMBRA 2020, Spain (Sección Blood Window)
- Galacticat 2020, Spain (Sección Oficial en Competencia)
- IndieBo 2020, Colombia (Película de Clausura)
- Night Visions 2020, Finland (Sección Oficial en Competencia)
- Buffalo Dreams 2020, U.S.A (Ganador Mejor Película, Mejor Director, Mejor Actor por Conrado Osorio)
- Horrible Imaginings 2020, U.S.A (Mejor Película, Mejor Director, Mejor Actor por Conrado Osorio, Mejor Dirección de Fotografía)
- Ravenna Nightmare Film Festival 2020, Italy - Mención Especial Mejor Director
- Panamá Horror Film Festival 2020, Panama - (Sección Oficial en Competencia)
- FANT Bilbao 2020, Spain - (Sección Panorama)
- Espanto Film Fest 2021, México - (Sección Oficial a Competencia)
- Macabro Film Fest 2021, México - (Sección Oficial a Competencia)
- El Grito 2021, Venezuela - (Sección Oficial)
- Festival Internacional de Cine de Cuenca 2021, Ecuador - (Zona Oscura)
- IIK!!-kauhuelokuvafestivaali 2020, Finland - (Official Selection)
- Oltre lo specchio, Italy - (Official Selection)
- Curtas, Spain - (Honorable Mention Best Latin Film)
- FESAALP 2020, Argentina - (Best Film "Aullidos)
- Fractured Visions 2020, UK - (Official Selection)
- Terror Cordoba 2020, Argentina - (Official Selection)
- Festival 1000 Gritos 2020, Argentina - (Official Selection)
- Bogotá Horror Film Festival 2021, Colombia - (Official Selection)
- Zinema Zombie Film Fest 2021, Colombia - (Official Selection)
- Mostra de Cinema Fantástico Cine Horror 2021, Brazil - (Official Selection)
- Cinefantasy IFFF 2021, Brazil - (Official Selection)
- Medellin Horror Film Fest 2021, Colombia - (Winner Best Feature Film)
- SFTF Film Festival 2021, Colombia - (Best Film / Surprise Film)
- IndieCork Film Festival 2021, Ireland - (Official Selection)
- The Galactic Imaginarium Film Festival 2021, Rumania - (Fantasy Official Selection)
- Festival Boca do Inferno 2021, Brazil - (Official Selection)
- Espanto Film Fest 2021, Mexico - (Winner Best International Feature film)
- CUTÚN | Festival de terror y fantasia, 2021, Chile - (Official Selection)
- CINE HORROR - Mostra de Cinema Fantástico 2021, Brazil - (Official Selection)
