= Grimmfest =

UK genre film festival

- Location: Manchester, United Kingdom
- Founded: 2009
- Directors: Simeon Halligan, Rachel Richardson-Jones
- Festival date: Annually in October
- Language: English; International
- Website: grimmfest.com

Grimmfest, formerly known as Grimm Up North, is an international film festival for horror and fantastic genre films held annually in Manchester, United Kingdom. It premieres and awards both feature and short films from the genres.

It is often cited as one of the most important genre festivals in the United Kingdom and the world, being named as one of MovieMaker's "50 Best Genre Festivals in the World" in 2021, and one of the "30 Bloody Best Genre Festivals" in 2019, as well as one of Dread Central's "Best Horror Festivals in the World" in 2022. It is a member festival of the Melies International Festivals Federation.

== History ==
The festival was started as Grimm Up North in 2009 by filmmakers Simeon Halligan and Rachel Richardson-Jones, and festival programmer Steve Balshaw, until fans started shortening it to Grimmfest, a title which was eventually adopted officially.

Over the years the main festival has been hosted at a number of different venues, including Vue Printworks, The Dancehouse theatre, and the Odeon Great Northern.

== Awards ==
Grimmfest awards the following categories:

- Best Feature
- Best Director
- Best Actor
- Best Actress
- Best Screenplay
- Best Score
- Best Cinematography
- Best Art Direction
- Best Short
- Best SFX
- Best Scare
- Audience Award

== See also ==
- List of fantastic and horror film festivals
- FrightFest
