= The Head Hunter (2018 film) =

2018 American fantasy horror film

- Film festival poster by Christopher Shy
- Directed by: Jordan Downey
- Screenplay by: Jordan Downey; Kevin Stewart
- Produced by: Jordan Downey; Ricky Fosheim; Kevin Stewart
- Starring: Christopher Rygh; Cora Kaufman
- Cinematography: Kevin Stewart
- Edited by: Jordan Downey
- Music by: Nick Soole
- Production companies: Brayne Studios; Detention Films
- Distributed by: Vertical Entertainment
- Release dates: October 6, 2018 (Sitges Film Festival); April 5, 2019 (United States)
- Running time: 72 minutes
- Country: United States
- Language: English
- Budget: $30,000
- Box office: $380,829

The Head Hunter, originally titled The Head, is a 2018 American independent fantasy horror film directed, written, produced and edited by Jordan Downey. It stars Norwegian actor Christopher Rygh, Cora Kaufman, and Aisha Ricketts. The film centers on the title character, who works as a bounty hunter for a local kingdom, all the while he awaits the eventual return of the creature that murdered his daughter.

Influenced by Quest for Fire, The Witch, The X-Files, and Tales From the Crypt, The Head Hunter was developed by Downey and Kevin Stewart. The filming location was decided long before the story was developed. The concept was developed at a writer's retreat, in which the filmmakers had assembled and hosted at Stewart's family home in Soutelo Mourisco, a small village in Northern Portugal. Rygh, in his feature-film debut, was cast in the leading role after the filmmakers discovered him on a casting website. Principal photography began in Bragança, Portugal, while additional scenes were shot in Norway, and California.

The Head Hunter premiered at the Sitges Film Festival on October 6, 2018, as a part of the "Panorama Fantàstic" section. While the film was screened under the title The Head at Sitges and Nightmares Film Festival, but was later changed to The Head Hunter due to lukewarm reactions. The film received several awards and nominations at various film festivals and received positive reviews from critics upon its release, with many praising the film's atmosphere, cinematography, and Rygh's performance, although its low budget prompted some criticism.

== Plot ==
In the Dark Ages, a fierce hunter known as "The Father" lives in a remote cabin, with his only company being his horse Jakke. He earns his living as a bounty hunter, hunting down beasts that terrorize a nearby kingdom.

Each new bounty is announced by the blow of a horn, and information on the target is posted outside the castle walls. After killing them, he collects their heads, which he stakes to the cabin wall. Besides hunting, most of his time is spent repairing his armor, setting traps for animals, visiting his daughter's grave, and using the blood and organs of beasts to create a healing elixir to heal his wounds.

During the latest hunt, Jakke is killed. After he buries Jakke and visits his daughter's grave, another bounty is posted. The father is shocked to learn that the bounty is for the creature responsible for his daughter's death. He travels far north to an island and finds the monster in a cave, where he decapitates it and returns home with its head.

In his cabin, a jar of the elixir is knocked over and spills over the creature's head, bringing it back to life. The revived head drags itself into the woods to search for a new body. Later, the father discovers what has transpired and prepares to hunt down the creature. When nightfall arrives, he begins a game of wits against the creature. To his horror, the creature unearths his daughter's grave and attaches its head to her corpse. He pursues the creature to a nearby cave and is attacked. After a lengthy battle, the father tears off the head from his daughter's corpse and stabs it repeatedly.

The next morning, he reburies his daughter and returns home. After cleaning up, he leaves the cabin to begin repairs on his armor. While doing so, he suddenly cries out before going silent. Shortly after, what appears to be the father returns to the cabin with a severed head. After the head is pinned onto the wall, it is revealed to be the father's. The creature, its head now attached to the hunter's body, leaves with the elixir.

== Cast ==
- Christopher Rygh as Father (The Head Hunter), a lone Viking warrior, and bounty hunter tasked with hunting down monsters for the local kingdom
- Cora Kaufman as Daughter, Father's child, who was brutally murdered by a mysterious and deadly creature
- Aisha Ricketts as The Head (voice), a deadly creature responsible for the brutal murder of the Head Hunter's child

== Production ==
=== Concept and development ===
"We've seen dragons, and we've seen monster battles before, but what we haven't seen is how a character responds to that stuff."

— Writer/director Jordan Downey on the inspiration for the film's story

The Head Hunter was produced and directed by Jordan Downey, who also co-wrote the script with Kevin Stewart. Downey had previously directed several short films, including the 2014 short Critters: Bounty Hunter, (Note: Based on the film franchise of the same name.) and the 2008 comedy-horror film ThanksKilling. After the completion of several short films, including Thankskilling 2, Downey and his frequent collaborator Stewart began development of their next project.

The concept for The Head Hunter was not immediately forthcoming, as Downey states, "We didn't have the idea first, we just had this drive to make a movie [...] So we just sat down, to see if we could come up with something that we could shoot for a low budget." The story was later developed during a writer's retreat at Stewart's family home. At the retreat, the filmmakers had envisioned a scene of a lone warrior carrying a severed head inside a sack, stumbling into a room filled with heads mounted on the walls. With this scene in mind, the filmmakers wrote a forty-page script, which contained minimal dialogue, describing it as a medieval horror film. From the outset, both Downey and Stewart knew that the film would be low-budget with a small cast, which was all factored into the film's script. For inspiration, Jordan Downey and Kevin Stewart have cited Jean-Jacques Annaud's Quest for Fire (1981), Robert Eggers' The Witch (2015), The X-Files, and Tales From the Crypt.

=== Pre-production ===
Actor Christopher Rygh as the title character. The costume was designed by Swedish costume designer André Bravin and made from leather.

Early in pre-production, the two filmmakers decided to shoot in Soutelo Mourisco, a small village in Northern Portugal, due to the remoteness of its location. The filmmakers wanted to utilize the location for some time, feeling that its remoteness and scenery "would lend itself very well to a horror movie". For the titular character, they wanted the role to look and feel authentic, and refused to cast an American actor as they felt that it would not be appropriate for the period and feared that it would end up 'looking fake'. Norwegian actor Christopher Rygh was cast in the lead role, in his feature-film debut, after they discovered him on a casting website. Downey said that there was no formal audition; he was cast after discussions on the film.

Construction of the props and monsters commenced before the script was completed, with the filmmakers experimenting with the designs and techniques to accommodate their low budget. In creating the look and feel of decomposition in the severed heads, the production crew acquired old Halloween masks, staining them and placing layers of melted plastic over them to create the effect of rotting flesh. Other props for the film were purchased inexpensively by the production crew the day after Halloween, as Downey recalled: "we just bought every medieval thing in there we could find. Every plastic sword or shield, skeletons, and skulls, anything that just looked kind of creepy, crawly, medieval, or metal. We bought it all." The title character's armor was created by the Swedish costume designer André Bravin, who made it out of leather. Downey described the armor as 'being more Leatherface-esque, rather than a Game of Thrones-style vibe', with faces and skin appearing stitched into the entire outfit. The film's main antagonist, credited as "The Head", was designed Troy Smith, who had previously worked with Downey in both his Thankskilling series and Critters: Bounty Hunter.

=== Filming ===
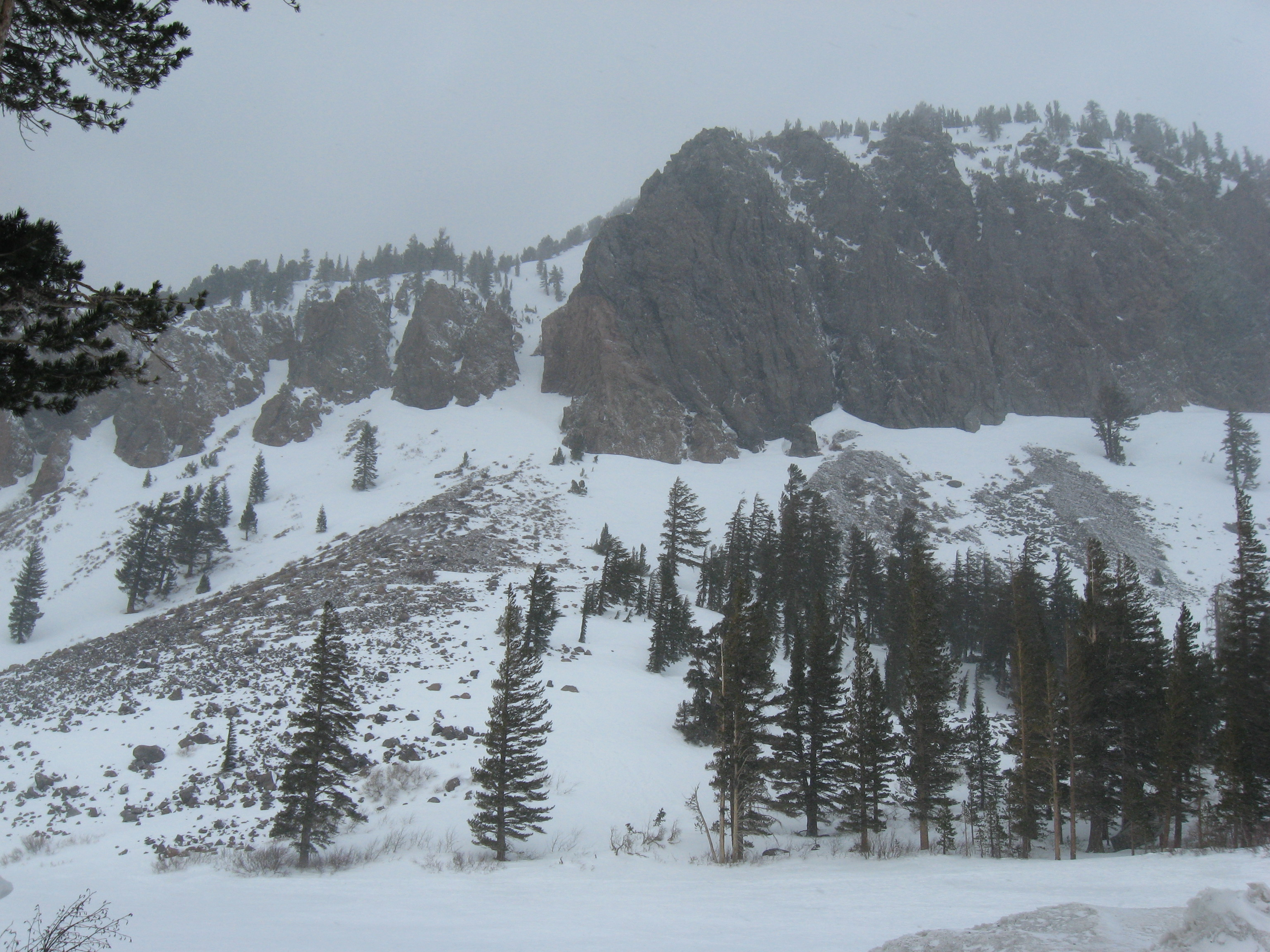
Additional scenes for the film were shot in Mammoth Lakes, California.

Principal photography began in Bragança, Portugal, while additional scenes were shot in Norway, and Mammoth Lakes, California. With little dialogue in the film, Downey stated that he had always admired films that centered more on visual storytelling, rather than relying on dialogue to convey the story. To accommodate the film's low budget, the variety of creatures that appear throughout the film are only shown in glimpses or merely implied, the film's low budget also limited the amount of production crew, which, according to Stewart, only consisted of three other people, including himself and Downey. Shooting occasionally proved challenging, as the costumes and props had to be shot in a certain way to "look right on camera", and crew members, including Downey, performed multiple roles during production.

The climactic fight sequence was shot in a water mine, after one of Stewart's cousins suggested it as a possible location to film. The scene was devised as a way to enhance the threat of "The Head", by forcing the title character to fight it at less than full strength, as he is unable to use the weapons that he is accustomed to fighting with. Shooting at the location, as Downey stated, was the most difficult, and frustrating portion to shoot, with cast and crew members forced to enter the location one at a time. Describing the cave's conditions, Downey noted: "It was really crammed, dark and there were spiders and water up to our ankles and knees. The torch was putting off fumes and there was no ventilation." Downey developed a cold after shooting at the location. Rygh, who had previously starred in the Norwegian short film Ulfberht, was described by Downey as easy to work with, and never complained on set.

=== Music ===
The Head Hunter

Film score by Nick Soole
- Released: April 8, 2019 (Digital); September 15, 2020 (Vinyl)
- Studio: Gamma Ray Gun
- Genres: Soundtrack; Classical; Strings
- Length: 1:04:00
- Labels: Gamma Ray Gun (Digital); Ship To Shore Phonograph Co. (Vinyl)
- Producers: Nick Soole (composer); Sean Sumwalt (conductor); Adam Michalik (engineer); Gina Luciani (Soloist); The Beelzebub Smith Ensemble (ensemble)

Nick Soole composed the film score for The Head Hunter with some of the sound design provided by Soole. The soundtrack was released on Digital download on April 8, 2019. The soundtrack was featured in an official selection of Soole's works during the 2019 San Diego Comic Con's "Sounds of Horror" Panel on July 19, 2019. On September 15, 2020, it was given a limited edition "Viking Flame" vinyl by Ship To Shore, with copies including a 30-day free subscription to the streaming service Shudder.

==== Track listing ====
No.	Title	Length
1.	"Something Is out There"	03:50
2.	"Opening Titles"	01:19
3.	"The Potion"	03:35
4.	"Solitude"	02:23
5.	"Summoned"	02:37
6.	"Trophy Wall"	01:00
7.	"Slow Days"	01:32
8.	"Goblin Whispers"	01:56
9.	"Dragon"	00:45
10.	"Summoned Again"	03:09
11.	"A Gift - It's Back"	02:59
12.	"The Journey"	02:00
13.	"Castle Revelry"	00:32
14.	"The Monster's Lair"	01:10
15.	"The Journey Home"	04:12
16.	"The Head"	04:45
17.	"It's out There"	01:44
18.	"It's in Here"	01:20
19.	"Hunting It"	04:48
20.	"Entering the Cave"	05:13
21.	"Final Fight"	01:31
22.	"Arrowhead"	04:35
23.	"The End..."	07:40
Total length:		64:35

== Release ==
=== Festival screenings ===
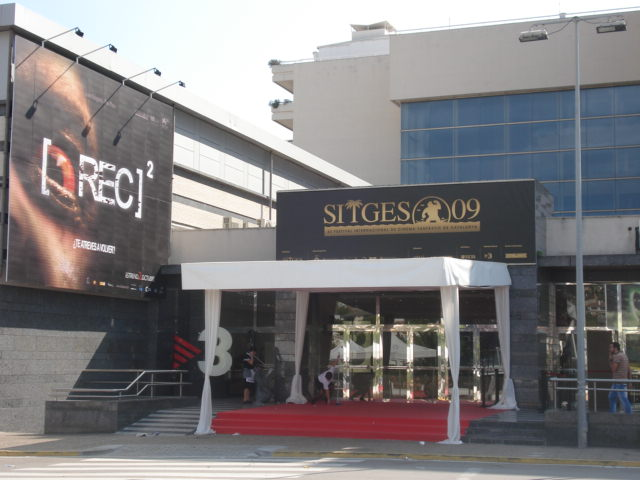
The premiere of The Head Hunter occurred at the 2018 Sitges Film Festival, where it was included in the festival's "Panorama Fantàstic" program (pictured 2009).

The Head Hunter premiered at the Sitges Film Festival on October 6, 2018, to a sold-out crowd. It was later screened at the Nightmares Film Festival on October 20, 2018. While the film was screened at Sitges, and Nightmares Film Festival under the title The Head, it was changed to The Head Hunter in later screenings. According to filmmakers Downey and Stewart, the reason for the change was mainly due to lukewarm reactions under the initial name, with the film's distributor, Vertical Entertainment, suggesting a change in the film's title. After "combing through all kinds of medieval literature", the filmmakers later came up with the film's current title. Downey and Stewart were originally against the name change, but later embraced it as they felt the current title shifted the focus from the antagonist to the main character.

Under the new title, the film was screened at the Insólito Festival de Cine de Terror y Fantasía on February 7, 2019. It was screened at the Fantasporto Film Festival later that month on the 24th. It was selected for inclusion into the 54th annual Portland International Film Festival, and was screened in the "PIFF After Dark" section of the program on March 16, 2019.

=== Distribution and limited release ===
Worldwide distribution rights for the film, under the original title The Head, were purchased by Vertical Entertainment on October 25, 2018, to launch international sales at the American Film Market on the 31st. The first trailer debuted on March 14, 2018, and received over 5 million views. It became the #1 most viewed trailer on iTunes Movie Trailers, briefly surpassing the total views of current blockbusters including Avengers: Endgame, Toy Story 4, and John Wick 3 according to Downey.

It received a limited theatrical release in the United States on April 5, 2019. The film premiered in Russia on May 1, 2019, grossing $44,652 in its limited run. On January 7, 2021, it premiered in Mexico with an additional $335,796 gross. It eventually accumulated a worldwide gross of $380,829.

=== Home media ===
The Head Hunter was released via video on demand, cable, and digital media on April 5, 2019. It was released on DVD by Lionsgate Home Entertainment on May 7, and grossed a total of $92,365 in domestic video sales. On November 21, it was announced that Shudder had acquired streaming rights to the film and would begin streaming it worldwide on the platform on December 5.

On April 12, 2021, it was released on Blu-ray in the United Kingdom by the independent distribution company 101 Films. Released under the BBFC's 15 certificate, this version was notably shorter, with a 69-minute runtime in contrast to the official 72-minute version.

== Reception ==
=== Critical response ===
The Head Hunter received positive reviews from critics on its release. Review aggregation website Rotten Tomatoes, which has compiled old and contemporary reviews, reports that 94% of 17 critics provided positive reviews for the film, with an average rating of 7.20/10. The plot was generally well received. Paste Magazine's Kenneth Lowe wrote that the film "eschews most graphic violence and crazy battle scenes to tell a tighter story", and favorably compared its storytelling approach to the literary works of Robert E. Howard in its "hinting at a wider world of ghoulish dangers". Noel Murray of Los Angeles Times described the plot's "stripped down" simplicity as "refreshing". On: Yorkshire Magazine described the premise as "a lean, mean adventure".

The film's cinematography has been highly praised. Writing for Screen Rant, Sandy Schaefer said that the film location "help to create the feeling that this story really is unfolding in an ancient setting". Dread Central's Jonathan Barkan described the film as "visually beautiful" in its atmospheric capture of the (mostly) Portugal landscape. Writing for Polygon, Rafael Motamayor favorably compared the cinematography to the fantasy game Skyrim in its "capturing vast emptiness and misty forests". Its seamless blend of music and cinematography was noted by Starburst Magazine's John Townsend, who states that it effectively "deepen[s] the sense of scale and emotion." Joblo's Jake Dee found The Head Hunter's cinematography and imagery effective in its building of a "real and authentic" world. Kat Hughes of The Hollywood News highlighted the cinematography as the film's main strength commenting that it "successfully conjures up otherworldly and Medieval vibes and effortlessly transports the viewer to another plane".

Reviews of Rygh's performance were positive. As Motamayor writes, "Rygh does an excellent job conveying the emptiness[...] and how much grief drives the man's thirst for revenge. Jonathan Barkan of Dread Central stated that Rygh's performance was both "interesting" and "captivating" in its portrayal of a warrior broken by grief. Crow also found Rygh perfectly cast for the role, calling him "a fabulous lead who looks like a man who lived in that time". Janel Spiegel of HorrorNews.net praised Rygh for his ability to encapsulate the different sides of the character through his movements, eyes, and quiet intensity. Writing for the British magazine Little White Lies, Anton Bitel noted that Downey's decision to focus on what he described as "the inner workings of its protagonist's day-to-day existence", he crafted a film "as a close study in psychodrama". Schaefer would note that Rygh was effectively portrayed a fully fleshed out character through minimal dialogue.

Bloody Disgusting's John Squires wrote that, despite the film's low budget, it "looks and feels like a polished Hollywood production". Dee also expressed admiration for the film's production, which achieve a look reminiscent of a film made for several times its actual budget. Townsend commended the film's ability to create a minimalist but "fully textured" world with limited funding, although he believed "many viewers will have more questions than answers" on the film's occasional narrative ambiguity. Alternately, Polygon's Motamayor described the budget as the film's major flaw, noting that its low budget forced most of the action and more detailed fantasy elements off-camera. This criticism was echoed by Hughes who found issue with the lack of action and character details, leaving the audience to watch "a continual stream of a man sitting silently, reflecting on his quest". While Hughes commended the film for its production design and music, she concluded that "it ultimately fails to fully realise its potential".

=== Accolades and recognition ===
In 2024, Collider listed The Head Hunter as the 12th best historical horror movies while Screen Rant placed it as 7th in their best historical horror movies list. Collider also ranked the film at 4th in their "The 10 Darkest Fantasy Movies", commenting that the film "has an atmosphere that no other movie has been able to match". That same year, the media website Looper listed the film in their "The 10 Best Dark Fantasy Movies (That Are Actually Scary)".

Award	Date of ceremony	Category	Recipient(s) and nominee(s)	Result	Ref.
Nightmares Film Festival	October 21, 2018	Best Cinematography Feature	Kevin Stewart	Won	
Nightmares Film Festival	October 21, 2018	Best Overall Feature	Jordan Downey	Won	
Fantaspoa International Fantastic Film Festival	June 4, 2019	Best Special Effects	Kevin Stewart; Jordan Downey; Ricky Fosheim; Troy Smith	Won	
Fantasporto	March 2, 2019	Best Actor	Christopher Rygh	Won	
Fantasporto	March 2, 2019	Best Portuguese Film	Kevin Stewart; Jordan Downey; Ricky Fosheim	Won	
Insólito Festival de Cine de Terror y Fantasía	February 28, 2019	Best Actor	Christopher Rygh	Won	
