= Offscreen (disambiguation) =

The term offscreen describes fictional events in theatre, television, or film that do not occur directly on stage or in frame.

Offscreen or off screen may also refer to:

- Offscreen (film), a 2006 Danish film by Christoffer Boe
- Off Screen, a 2005 Dutch film by Pieter Kuijpers
- Off-Screen, an online magazine about film criticism
- Offscreen Film Festival, an annual international non-competitive film festival in Brussels, Belgium
