= Méliès International Festivals Federation =

Film festival federation

- Location: Brussels, Belgium
- Established: 1987
- Language: International
- Website: melies.org

Méliès International Festivals Federation (MIFF), formerly European Fantastic Film Festivals Federation (EFFFF), established in 1987, is a network of 22 genre film festivals from 16 countries based in Brussels, Belgium, and dedicated to promoting and supporting European cinema, particularly films in the fantasy, horror and science fiction genres.

In their book Cult Cinema: An Introduction, Ernest Mathijs and Jamie Sexton describe it as "the biggest fan-based cult-network on the continent", comparable in scope to World Science Fiction Convention, San Diego Comic-Con, and Fangoria's Weekend of Horrors, though less commercial.

Each year, the federation presents the Méliès d'Or (Golden Méliès) to recognize the Best European Fantastic Feature Film and Short Film, as well as the Federation Award for Best Asian Film.

== History ==
MIFF was founded in 1987 on the initiative of five film festivals: Fantafestival in Rome, Fantasporto in Porto, the Paris International Festival of Fantastic and Science-Fiction Film, the Brussels International Fantastic Film Festival and the Sitges Film Festival.

The federation created its first awards in 1995, the Méliès d'Argent (Silver Méliès) and the Méliès d'Or (Golden Méliès), named in honour of Georges Méliès, the great French pioneer of fantastic cinema and special effects. The awards were intended to highlight the creativity and quality of European fantastic films, stimulate production and promote them worldwide.

The first Méliès d'Or ceremony was held by the Brussels International Fantastic Film Festival in 1996 and the prize was given to Álex de la Iglesia for The Day of the Beast. Variety has called the Melies d'Or "Europe's top plaudit for horror pictures".

== Member festivals ==
=== Affiliated members ===
- Brussels International Fantastic Film Festival – Brussels, Belgium
- Sitges Film Festival – Sitges, Spain
- Imagine Film Festival – Amsterdam, The Netherlands
- Lund International Fantastic Film Festival – Lund, Sweden
- MotelX - Lisbon International Horror Film Festival – Lisbon, Portugal
- Neuchâtel International Fantastic Film Festival – Neuchâtel, Switzerland
- Strasbourg European Fantastic Film Festival – Strasbourg, France
- Trieste Science+Fiction Festival – Trieste, Italy

=== Competitive members ===
- Abertoir: The International Horror Festival of Wales – Aberystwyth, Wales
- Court Metrange Festival – Rennes, France
- Curtas Festival do Imaxinario – Vilagarcía de Arousa, Spain
- FanCine - Festival de Cine Fantástico – Málaga, Spain
- Fant - Festival de Cine Fantástico de Bilbao – Bilbao, Spain
- Fantaspoa International Fantastic Film Festival – Porto Alegre, Brazil
- Galician Freaky Film Festival – Vigo, Spain
- Grimmfest – Manchester, United Kingdom
- Grossmann Fantastic Film and Wine Festival – Ljutomer, Slovenia
- Haapsalu Horror & Fantasy Film Festival – Haapsalu, Estonia
- HARD:LINE International Film Festival – Regensburg, Germany
- Isla Calavera - Canary Islands Fantastic Film Festival – Canary Islands, Spain
- Molins de Rei Horror Film Festival – Molins de Rei, Spain
- Razor Reel Flanders Film Festival – Bruges, Belgium
- Ramaskrik Film Festival – Oppdal, Norway
- Ravenna Nightmare Film Fest – Ravenna, Italy
- San Sebastian Horror & Fantasy Film Festival – San Sebastián, Spain
- Slash Film Festival – Vienna, Austria
- Splat!FilmFest – Warsaw and Lublin, Poland

=== Supporting members ===
- Fantasia International Film Festival – Montreal, Quebec, Canada
- Fantastic Fest – Austin, Texas, U.S.
- Mórbido Fest – Puebla, Mexico
- Bucheon International Fantastic Film Festival – Bucheon, South Korea
- Screamfest Horror Film Festival – Hollywood, Los Angeles, California, U.S.
- Offscreen Film Festival – Brussels, Belgium
- Maskoon Fantastic Film Festival – Beirut, Lebanon
- Wench Film Festival – Mumbai and Kolkata, India

=== Former members ===
- Cinénygma Luxembourg International Film Festival – Luxembourg City, Luxembourg
- Dead by Dawn – Edinburgh, Scotland
- Espoo Ciné International Film Festival – Espoo, Finland
- Fantafestival – Rome, Italy
- Fantasporto – Porto, Portugal
- Horrorthon Film Festival – Dublin, Ireland
- London FrightFest Film Festival – London, England
- NatFilm Festival – Copenhagen, Denmark
- Riga International Fantasy Film Festival – Riga, Latvia
- Utopiales – Nantes, France

== See also ==
- List of fantastic and horror film festivals
