= MOTELX - Lisbon International Horror Film Festival =

Horror film festival in Lisbon, Portugal

MOTELX
- Location: Lisbon, Portugal
- Founded: 2007
- Directors: Pedro Souto; João Monteiro
- Festival date: Annually in September
- Language: Portuguese; International
- Website: motelx.org

MOTELX - Lisbon International Horror Film Festival (sometimes stylized as MOTEL/X) is a film festival held annually in Lisbon, Portugal. It's dedicated primarily to horror films, but also focuses on different types of genre cinema. It premieres and awards both feature and short films, and hosts celebrities, artists, filmmakers, industry reps and press from the genre.

MOTELX promotes the best of horror produced worldwide while also encouraging the national production of genre films. The festival is organised by CTLX, a non-profit cultural organisation, recognised as a public utility entity, based in Lisbon, Portugal.

== History ==
MOTELX began in 2007, but its history dates back to the late 90s in an attic somewhere in Benfica, with a weekly meeting between friends at midnight on Fridays to watch horror films.

In the words of the festival's founders: “In the beginning, it was a large 20-kilo television, a VCR, two or three stacks of VHS tapes, all carried up the stairs to the attic with eight hands for full horror film sessions on Friday nights, which brought together friends who would come over late at night. Later, we were invited to take part in the celebrations of the 60th anniversary of the Júlio de Matos Hospital, with a programme of night sessions at Pavilion 21C. Then, we took part in festivals abroad, held horror weekends at the Cinema King (Lisbon), touring shows and, in 2005, the “Zombies – Os Monstros Vivos” series, which ran for the first 15 days of September on the terrace and in the rooms of the Cinemateca Portuguesa, which was invaded by a flood of more than 2,500 enthusiasts like us and which decisively pushed us to organise the first edition of MOTELX, at the Cinema São Jorge."

It is often cited as one of the world's most important genre festivals, being named three times one of MovieMaker Magazine's "Top Bloody Best Genre Fests in the World", in 2019, 2020 and 2021, as well as one of Dread Central's "Best Horror Festivals in the World" in both 2021 and 2022.

In 2011, MOTELX became the only Portuguese festival to be an active member of the Méliès International Festivals Federation. Since 2015, it has also been a member of Europe For Festivals, Festivals For Europe (EFFE). In 2017, it received accreditation from the International Federation of Film Producers' Associations (FIAPF), being one of the few genre film festivals to be part of it.

Taking on the motto "In September, terror invades Lisbon", MOTELX has been hosting the best international horror films and promoting emerging Portuguese horror cinema worldwide since 2007. Major names in the genre such as George A. Romero, Stuart Gordon, John Landis, Dario Argento, Tobe Hooper, Hideo Nakata, Eli Roth, Brian Yuzna, Alejandro Jodorowsky, Roger Corman and Ari Aster have joined the almost 20,000 people who visit the iconic Cinema São Jorge every year. The Festival's programme includes feature and short films, retrospectives, children's films and documentaries, as well as activities such as parties, workshops, masterclasses, concerts and much more.

The festival focuses on showing recent and classic films of various styles and subgenres over six days, and invites national and international guests to attend. It also highlights national productions through the MOTELX Award for Best Portuguese Horror Short Film. In 2016, in its 10th edition, the festival introduced a new competitive section, the Méliès d'Argent Award for Best European Horror Feature Film, and now also awards horror films in full-length. In 2018, the festival introduced the Audience Award for the Room Service Section, the main section of the Festival.

In 2024, it attracted around 19,500 attendees over 7 days of the Festival at Cinema São Jorge, complemented by 3 days of Warm-Up with open-air screenings, concerts, and parties.

== Reception ==
DreadCentral praised the festival's "top-shelf premiere program, wealth of workshops and party-packed atmosphere", where "audiences often mingle with special guests".

MovieMaker highlighted the curation which "gets the highest marks at this festival, celebrating the best of horror produced worldwide while also encouraging Portuguese genre films".

== Awards ==
MOTELX awards the following categories:

- Méliès d’Argent Award - Best European Feature Film
- Méliès d’Argent Award - Best European Short Film
- MOTELX Award - Best Portuguese Horror Short Film
- Audience Award - Best Feature Film - Room Service Section
- Big Bad Wolf Award - Best Short Film
- MOTELX Award - Best Portuguese Horror Script
- MicroShorts Award

== See also ==
- List of fantastic and horror film festivals
- Fantasporto
