= Beatriz Pacheco Pereira =

Portuguese writer, sculptor and cinephile

- Born: 26 June 1951 (age 75); Porto, Portugal
- Education: University of Porto
- Occupation: Film festival promoter • teacher • sculptor • writer
- Years active: 1970 to present
- Known for: Founder of Fantasporto film festival

Maria Beatriz Machado Pacheco Pereira Dorminsky de Carvalho (born 1951) is a Portuguese writer, teacher, sculptor, columnist, critic and specialist in Portuguese cinema. Together with her husband, Mário Dorminsky, she was the founder of the annual Fantasporto film festival in Porto in 1981.

== Early life ==
Pereira was born in the Bonfim area of Porto on 26 June 1951 into an aristocratic family. She is the daughter of Álvaro Gonçalo de Lima Pacheco Pereira, a professor of history, and of Maria Celina Machado, and the sister of the politician, José Pacheco Pereira. Her grandfather, Gonçalo Pacheco Pereira, was a well-known painter in Porto. She was exposed to the cinema from a young age. Her father took her to the cinema, and the school and church she attended both showed films. Her mother drew pictures of actors. From the age of six she started to classify films. She initially studied Germanic philology at the University of Coimbra before transferring to the University of Porto, where she graduated in Germanic philology with a specialization in English literature in 1970. She then obtained a British Council scholarship in 1970, which enabled her to continue her studies at the University of Cambridge. In 1972 she became a secondary school teacher, staying in that role until 2008.

== Artistic career ==
Pereira met Mário Dorminsky in 1972, when they were singing opera together with the Círculo Portuense de Ópera, he as a tenor and she as a soprano. They married in 1976. They founded the Cinema Novo Magazine in 1978, and in 1981, the Fantasporto-Porto International Film Festival, of which she is still the director. Covering numerous subjects she began to write regular newspaper columns on cinema, the city of Porto, visual arts, education, women's rights and politics, and also became a regular presence on radio and television. She is a columnist for the weekly newspaper Grande Porto and for Cinema News and has a weekly culture page in the Jornal de Notícias. She was the first female film critic in Portugal to write for a daily newspaper.

Her first publication was Frankenstein - Mary Shelley, James Whale, Boris Karloff and others (1994), in which she compared Mary Shelley's book Frankenstein and the figure seen in the film based on the novel, starring Boris Karloff. Her first published fiction was a book of short stories, As Fabulosas Histórias Dela — Contos do Porto Imaginado (2003). In the early 2000s Pereira began to work as a sculptor, although she did not make this known until 2008. She has exhibited at more than fifty collective and individual exhibitions and was invited to participate in the Venice Triennale in Italy. Her first exhibition, in Porto, was called The Restless Body. She works mainly in bronze.

== Awards and honours ==
Pereira was awarded Gold Medals from the city of Porto (2001) and Vila Nova de Gaia (2006). She received the Medal of Cultural Merit from the Portuguese State in 2005 for her work with Fantosporto.

== Publications ==
Pereira's publications are:

=== Fiction ===
- As Fabulosas Histórias Dela — Contos do Porto Imaginado (2003), Edição Ambar. Short stories
- O Amor Absurdo e Outras Histórias Improváveis (2007), Edição Texto Editora. Short stories.
- Tratado dos Anjos (2004), Edição Ambar. Novel.
- Bianca e o Dragão (2008), Edição Calendário das Letras. Novel.
- O Amanhã Perfeito (2009), Edição Calendário das Letras. Novel.
- O Homem Que Trazia Instruções e outras estórias (2012), Edição Edium. Short stories.
- Alice e os Abutres (2021), Edição Âncora. Novel.

=== Non fiction ===
- Frankenstein - Mary Shelley, James Whale, Boris Karloff e os outros (1994), Essay.
- Fotobiografia: 20 anos Fantasporto (1999), Photobiography.
- Fantas Graffiti (2000), Essay.
- Pre-Textos de Cinema (2000), Articles.
- Do Porto e do Olhar (2005), Articles.
- O Porto e as suas Mulheres (2005), Photobiography.
- A Década Furiosa (2013), Edição Seda Publicações. Collection of articles.
- Fantasporto 40 Anos: Uma História de Cinema (2021)
