= List of fantastic and horror film festivals =

List of film festivals and festival sections dedicated to fantastic, fantasy, horror, sci-fi and cult genre films.

Sitges Film Festival in Spain, Fantasia International Film Festival in Canada, and Fantastic Fest in the United States are generally considered to be the three largest and most prestigious festivals for fantastic and horror films. Other important genre festivals include Beyond Fest, Brooklyn Horror Film Festival, Brussels International Fantastic Film Festival, Bucheon International Fantastic Film Festival, Fantaspoa, Fantasporto, FilmQuest, FrightFest, MOTELX, Neuchatel International Fantastic Film Festival, Nightmares Film Festival, Overlook Film Festival, Screamfest, Telluride Horror Show and Toronto After Dark.

Some general film festivals also have sections for genre films, the most prestigious ones being Midnight Madness at TIFF, Midnight sidebars at Sundance Film Festival, Midnighter at SXSW, Escape from Tribeca at Tribeca Festival and Midnight Screenings at Cannes Film Festival.

Name	Est.	City	Country
A Night of Horror International Film Festival	2006	Eau Claire, Wisconsin (previously Sydney)	United States (previously Australia)
Abertoir Horror Festival	2006		United Kingdom
After Hours section at Cleveland International Film Festival		Cleveland, Ohio	United States
Beyond Fest		Los Angeles	United States
BizarroLand Film Festival	2015		United States
Blood in the Snow Canadian Film Festival	2012		Canada
Boston Science Fiction Film Festival	1976	Boston	United States
Boston Underground Film Festival	1998	Boston, Massachusetts	United States
Brooklyn Horror Film Festival	2016	New York City	United States
Brussels International Fantastic Film Festival	1983	Brussels	Belgium
Bucheon International Fantastic Film Festival	1997	Bucheon	South Korea
Buenos Aires Rojo Sangre	2000	Buenos Aires	Argentina
Calgary Underground Film Festival	2003	Calgary	Canada
Chattanooga Film Fest	2014	Chattanooga, Tennessee	United States
Cine-Excess	2007		United Kingdom
CWRU Film Society Science Fiction Marathon	1976	Cleveland, Ohio	United States
Dark Matters section at Austin Film Festival		Austin, Texas	United States
Escape from Tribeca section at Tribeca Festival		New York City	United States
Fancine		Malaga	Spain
Fanomenon section at Leeds International Film Festival		Leeds	United Kingdom
Fantafestival	1981	Rome	Italy
Fantasia International Film Festival		Montreal	Canada
Fantaspoa	2005	Porto Alegre	Brazil
Fantasporto	1981	Porto	Portugal
Fantastic Fest	2005	Austin, Texas	United States
Fantasy Filmfest	1987		Germany
FilmQuest	2013	Provo, Utah	United States
Freak Me Out section at Sydney Film Festival		Sydney	Australia
FrightFest	2000	London, Glasgow	United Kingdom
Full Moon section at Transilvania International Film Festival		Cluj-Napoca	Romania
GenreBlast	2016	Winchester, Virginia	United States
Gerardmer International Fantastic Film Festival	1994	Gerardmer	France
Graveyard Shift section at Nashville Film Festival		Nashville	United States
Grimmfest	2009	Manchester	United Kingdom
Grossmann Fantastic Film and Wine Festival	2005	Ljutomer	Slovenia
Haapsalu Horror and Fantasy Film Festival	2005	Haapsalu	Estonia
Imagine Film Festival	1991	Amsterdam	Netherlands
International Horror and Sci-Fi Film Festival	2005		United States
It's Alive! Horror Film Festival	2023	Sofia	Bulgaria
Late Night Showcase at Denver Film Festival		Denver, Colorado	United States
Lund International Fantastic Film Festival	1995		Sweden
Midnight sections at Sundance Film Festival		Park City, Utah	United States
Midnighter and Midnight Shorts sections at South by Southwest (SXSW)		Austin, Texas	United States
WTF: Wild, Terrifying, Fantastic! section at Seattle International Film Festival		Seattle	United States
Midnight Heat section at Hong Kong International Film Festival		Honk Kong	Hong Kong
Midnight Madness section at Edinburgh International Film Festival		Edinburgh	United Kingdom
Midnight Madness and Strange Cuts sections at Toronto International Film Festival (TIFF)		Toronto	Canada
Midnight Passion section at Busan International Film Festival		Busan	South Korea
Midnight Screenings at Cannes Film Festival		Cannes	France
Midnight Screenings at Karlovy Vary International Film Festival		Karlovy Vary	Czechia
Mile High Horror Film Festival	2010		United States
Molins Horror Film Festival	1973	Molins de Rei	Spain
Monster Fest	2009	Melbourne	Australia
Morbido Fest	2008		Mexico
MOTELX - Lisbon International Horror Film Festival	2007	Lisbon	Portugal
Neuchatel International Fantastic Film Festival	2000	Neuchatel	Switzerland
Nevermore Film Festival		Durham, North Carolina	United States
New York City Horror Film Festival	2001	New York City	United States
Night Shift section at Melbourne International Film Festival		Melbourne	Australia
Night Visions	1997	Helsinki	Finland
Nightmare in the Ozarks Film Festival	2024	Eureka Springs, Arkansas	United States
Nightmares Film Festival	2016	Columbus, Ohio	United States
Offscreen Film Festival	2008		Belgium
Overlook Film Festival	2017	New Orleans, Louisiana	United States
Paris International Fantastic Film Festival	2011	Paris	France
Ramaskrik Film Festival	2011	Oppdal	Norway
Rebels With a Cause and Midnight Shivers sections at Tallinn Black Nights Film Festival		Tallinn	Estonia
Renegade Film Festival	2017		United States
Saskatoon Fantastic Film Festival	2010	Saskatoon	Canada
Sci-Fi-London	2002	London	United Kingdom
Screamfest	2001	Los Angeles	United States
Sitges Film Festival	1968	Sitges	Spain
South African Horrorfest	2005		South Africa
Strasbourg European Fantastic Film Festival	2007	Strasbourg	France
Telluride Horror Show	2010	Telluride, Colorado	United States
Toronto After Dark	2006	Toronto	Canada
Trieste Science+Fiction Festival	2000	Trieste	Italy
TromaDance	1999	New York City	United States
Twilight Zone section at Stockholm International Film Festival		Stockholm	Sweden
Vortex sidebar at Rhode Island International Film Festival			United States
Yubari International Fantastic Film Festival	1990		Japan

== See also ==
- List of film festivals
- Melies International Festivals Federation
- Category:Fantasy and horror film festivals
