= Iron Doors =

2010 film

- Film poster
- Directed by: Stephen Manuel
- Written by: Peter Arneson
- Produced by: Stephen Manuel
- Starring: Axel Wedekind
- Cinematography: Jan Reiff
- Release dates: 24 April 2010 (Haapsalu Horror and Fantasy Film Festival); 10 March 2011 (Germany)
- Running time: 80 minutes
- Country: Germany
- Language: English

Iron Doors is a 2010 German 3D thriller film directed by Stephen Manuel.

== Plot ==
A man (Axel Wedekind) wakes up in a strange concrete vault after a night of drinking and realizes he is trapped. With the help of an unlikely companion (Rungano Nyoni) who is also trapped, they must find a way out before they starve to death.

== Cast ==
- Axel Wedekind
- Rungano Nyoni
