= Lund International Fantastic Film Festival =

Swedish film festival

- Location: Lund, Scania, Sweden
- Hosted by: Lund Fantastic Film Festival
- Artistic director: Sara Löfgren König
- Festival date: Opening: 24 October 2025; Closing: 31 October 2025
- Website: www.fff.se

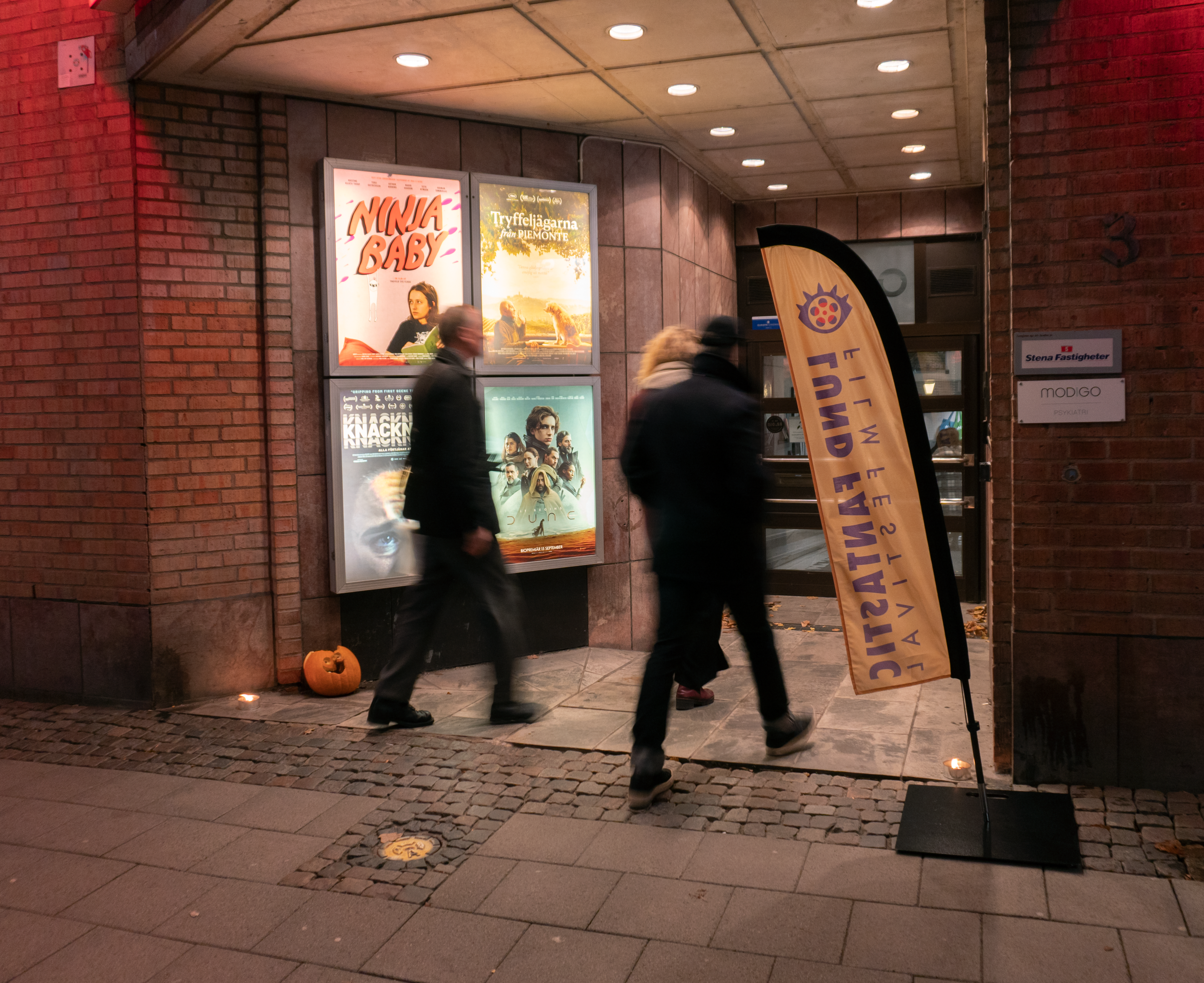

The Lund International Fantastic Film Festival (Swedish: Fantastisk Filmfestival, abbreviated FFF or LIFFF) is a popular film festival in Lund in southern Sweden that mainly shows fantasy, science fiction and horror films. LIFFF is the largest fantastic/genre film festival in Scandinavia.

In 2015 the festival was broken up into two parts. The first part took place in Malmö 22–27 September, and the main festival part was held in Lund 22–31 October.

The 2025 edition will take place from 24 October to 31 October. As a member of the Méliès International Festivals Federation the festival will host the Méliès d’Argent Award. The winners announced on closing day will compete for the Méliès d’Or.

== Venues ==
The festival office and the ticket registers are located in the Lund city hall. Most of the screenings during the main festival in October, as well as the year-round previews, take place in Lund, mainly in the cinemas Kino and SF, while the screenings in September take place in the Malmö cinema Spegeln. Some events and screenings are also arranged in other surrounding cities. Since July 2011, FFF regularly arranges a movie quiz at Moriskan in Malmö.

== Internationally ==
Since it started in 1995, LIFFF has shown films from more than 40 countries. The focus is always on the European continent, that contributes with at least 75% of the films screened at the festival. All movies in the program are Swedish premieres, Scandinavian premieres, European premieres or world premieres.

In 2001, the Lund Intl. Fantastic Film Festival joined the European Fantastic Film Festivals Federation. Together, they arrange the Méliès competition – one of LIFFF's several international competitions. The Méliès competition of LIFFF is held in late September, in Malmö.

== Guests of honour ==
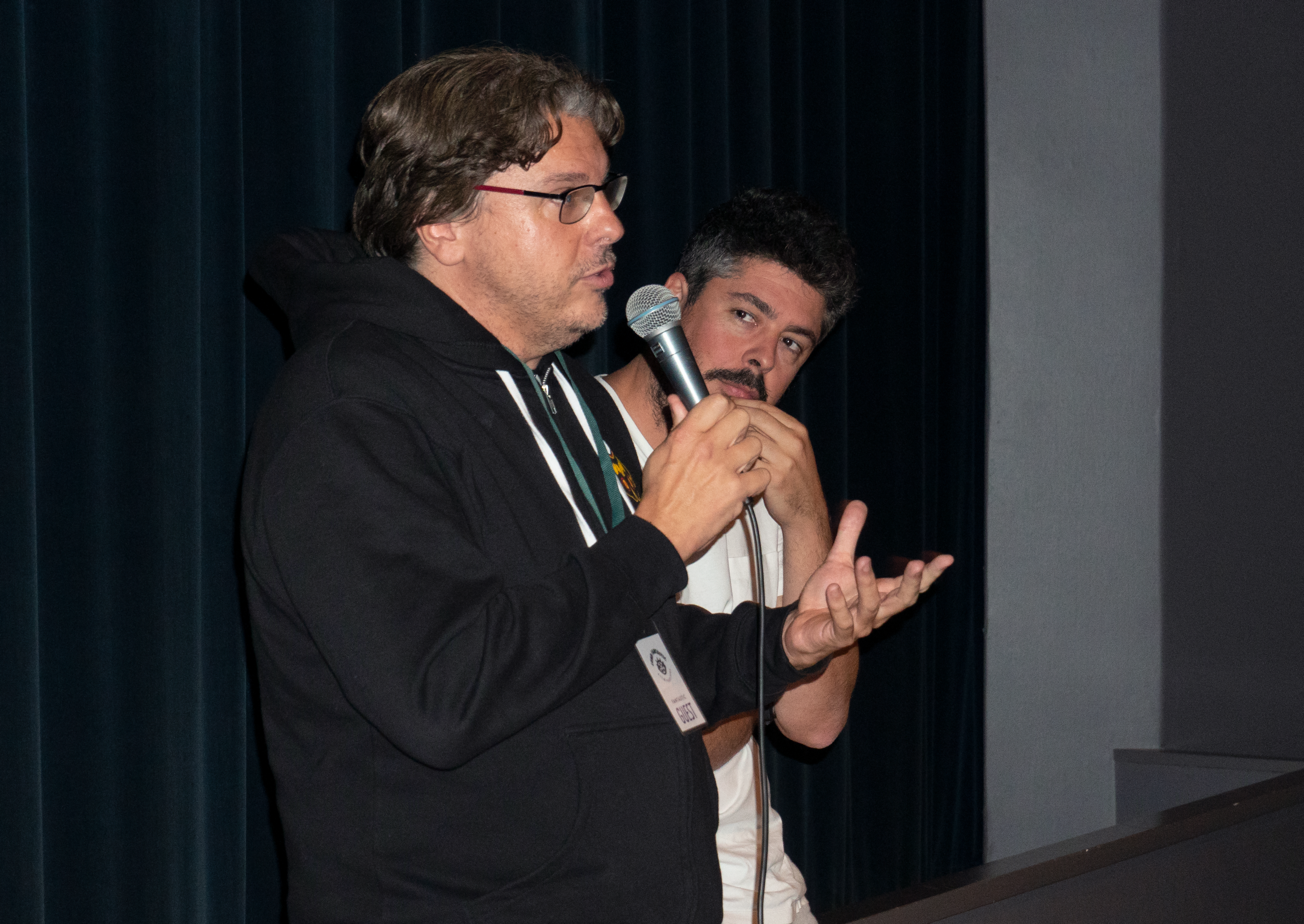
Directors Raúl Cerezo (left) and Fernando González Gómez (right) during a Q&A after a screening of their film The Passenger in 2022.

Every year, LIFFF invites a number of the film makers whose works have been selected for screening at the festival. These guests of honour often hold Q & A sessions after their films.

Notable guests from previous years include:

- Peter Greenaway
- Terry Gilliam
- Neil Gaiman
- Corey Feldman
- Jennifer Ulrich
- Alain Robbe-Grillet
- Marc Caro
- Alexandre Aja

== See also ==
- List of fantastic and horror film festivals
