= Bucheon International Fantastic Film Festival =

Horror films festival in South Korea

Coordinates: 37°30′N 126°47′E

- 29th edition official poster
- Location: Bucheon, South Korea
- Founded: 1997
- Most recent: 2025
- Hosted by: BIFAN Organizing Committee
- No. of films: 221 from 41 countries
- Festival date: Opening: July 3, 2025; Closing: July 13, 2025
- Language: Korean; English
- Website: bifan.kr

Current: 29th
- 30th 28th

The Bucheon International Fantastic Film Festival (Korean: 부천국제판타스틱영화제; Hanja: 富川國際판타스틱映畵祭), or BiFan, formerly known as Puchon International Fantastic Film Festival or PiFan, is an international film festival held annually in July in Bucheon, South Korea. Inaugurated in 1997, the festival focuses on South Korean and international horror, thriller, mystery and fantasy films, with particular attention to Asian cinema from East Asia and Southeast Asia. It is a non-competitive international film festival, with partial competition, awarding a number of awards.

== History ==
The inaugural festival was held in 1997. Until 2015, it was known as the Puchon International Fantastic Film Festival, or PiFan.

The festival faced a boycott in 2005 to protest what was seen by critics as meddling by Bucheon mayor Hong Geon-pyo. A rival event called RealFanta was organized that year on the same dates as BiFan by former festival director Kim Hong-joon. The festival returned in 2006 without any dispute under the direction of veteran filmmaker Lee Jang-ho and a new programming team.

Since then, editions of the festival have included the following:

- The 11th edition of PiFan, held from 12 to 24 July 2007, featured 225 films from 33 countries.
- The 12th edition of PiFan was held from 18 July to 27 July 2008.
- The 18th edition of PiFan was held from 17 July to 27 July 2014, featuring 210 films from 47 countries.
- The 19th Bucheon International Fantastic Film Festival (BiFan) took place from 16 to 26 July 2015, with a change of name. It showcased 235 films from 45 countries.
- The 20th edition of BiFan took place from 21 to 31 July 2016. It showcased 320 films from 49 countries.
- The 21st edition of BiFan was held from 13 July to 23 July 2017. It featured 289 films from 58 countries.
- The 22nd edition of BiFan was held from 12 July to 22 July 2018. It featured 290 films from 53 countries.
- The 23rd edition of BiFan took place from June 27 to 7 July 2019. It featured 299 films from 54 countries (166 Features, 133 Shorts).
- The 24th edition of BiFan took place from July 9 to 16, 2020. It featured 194 films from 42 countries.
- The 25th edition of BiFan was held from 8 to 18 July 2021. It featured 257 films from 47 countries. Due to the impact of the COVID-19 pandemic in South Korea, it was held in a hybrid format (online and offline) at five different locations, including Oul Madang and CGV Picnic. As per quarantine guidelines for COVID-19 containment, online screening of 154 films (61 feature films, 93 short films), which is about 60 % of the entire film festival were open to view on WAAVE over-the-top (OTT) service.
- The 26th edition of BiFan was held from 7 to 17 July 2022. It featured 268 films from 49 countries. From this edition a new award titled as 'Series Film Award' was started. The first Series Film Award was awarded to Squid Game.
- The 27th edition of BiFan was held from 29 June to 9 July 2023. It featured 262 films from 51 countries. Closing ceremony, hosted by Jo Sung-ha and Ye Ji-won was held on July 7 at Bucheon City Hall Main Theater. Bucheon Choice: Feature was awarded to The Witchcraft by Christopher Murray.
- The 28th edition of BiFan was held in July 2024. Best of Bucheon feature award went to The Last Stop in Yuma County.
- The 29th edition of BiFan was held at Bucheon Arts Center in Wonmi-gu, Bucheon-si from July 3, to July 13, 2025. The opening film was About a Hero by Polish director Piotr Biniewicz. Actor Lee Byung-hun is the star of this year's BIFAN Actor Special Exhibition. The closing ceremony was held on July 11, hosted by Kim Joo-ryoung. The Ugly Stepsister by Emilie Blichfeldt was awarded as Best Picture. The closing film was Dangol Restaurant by Han Jae-yi.

== Program ==
The festival's programming consists of following sections:

- Opening film
- Bucheon Choice
  - Bucheon Choice Features
  - Bucheon Choice: Shorts 1 Edit
  - Bucheon Choice: Shorts 2
- Korean Fantastic
  - Korean Fantastic: Competition
  - Korean Fantastic: Features
  - Korean Fantastic: Shorts
- World Fantastic Red
- World Fantastic Blue
- Family Zone
- Forbidden Zone
- Strange Hommage
- Fantastic Short Films
- Vertical Short Film Special Screening: 25
- BIFAN x wavve Online Screening

== Awards ==
The festival is a non-competitive international film festivals with partial competition. It gives away following awards:

- Bucheon Choice: It is the international competition section of the Bucheon International Fantastic Film Festival. It offers these awards:
  - Bucheon Choice Feature:
  - Best Picture (Award of KRW 20 million)
  - Director Award (5 million won in prize money)
  - Special Jury Prize (5 million won in prize money)
  - Featured Audience Award
- Bucheon Choice: Short
  - Best Short Film (5 million won in prize money)
  - Short Film Jury Award (3 million won in prize money)
  - Short Audience Award
- Korean Fantastic: This is a domestic competition section for the Korean films.
- Korean Fantastic: Feature
  - Korean Fantastic Film Award (20 million won in prize money)
  - Korean Fantastic Director Award (5 million won in prize money)
  - Korean Fantastic Actor Award (2 people)
  - Korean Fantastic Audience Award
  - NH Agricultural Negotiation (distribution support award, 10 million won)
  - CGV Award (Distribution Support Award, 10 million won)
  - Best Feature Award (2 films, 5 million won each)
- Korean Fantastic: Short
  - Korean Fantastic Short Film Award (5 million won in prize money)
  - Korean Fantastic Short Audience Award
  - Best Short Film that Watcha noticed (5 episodes, 1 million won each)
- Méliès International Film Festival Federation (MIFF) Asian Film Award: This award is given for the purpose of discovering and promoting Asian fantastic genre films.
- NETPAC award: This award is awarded by Netpack, the Asian Film Promotion Organization.
- Odd Family Award: Instituted from 26th edition, it is awarded to the Best Film from the 'Odd Family section' by BIFAN Strange Children Jury, composed of children of Bucheon City.
- Series Film Award: Instituted from 26th edition, it is awarded to the best drama series.

== Academic research ==
The festival has been the topic of academic research

== See also ==
- List of fantastic and horror film festivals
- European Fantastic Film Festivals Federation
- List of festivals in South Korea
- List of festivals in Asia
