= Saskatoon Fantastic Film Festival =

Film festival in Canada

The Saskatoon Fantastic Film Festival is an annual film festival, which takes place in Saskatoon, Saskatchewan, Canada. The festival programs an annual line-up of science fiction, horror, fantasy, thriller drama and other genre films.

The festival was launched in 2010 as the Dark Bridges Film Festival, modeled on events such as the Fantasia International Film Festival in Montreal, the After Dark Film Festival in Toronto and the Midnight Madness stream at the Toronto International Film Festival. It changed its name to Saskatoon Fantastic Film Festival in 2014, to counter an audience perception that the festival focused solely on horror films. The city's local zombie walk was also staged to occur as part of the event for a few years but it has gone on to become its own event separate from the festival.

== See also ==
- List of fantastic and horror film festivals
