= Mórbido Fest =

Annual film festival in Mexico

- Location: Mexico City, Mexico
- Founded: 2008
- Language: International
- Website: www.morbidofest.com

Mórbido Fest is an annual fantasy and horror film festival in Mexico City, Mexico. Known as "Mexico’s Premier Horror Event", it was founded in 2008 by Pablo Guisa Koestinger and is a member of the Méliès International Festivals Federation.

== History ==
Prior guests include Roger Corman, Barbara Crampton, Elijah Wood, Hideo Nakata, John Landis and Joe Dante.

The 2016 event took place November 2–6 and featured 28 films from 13 nations, plus 77 short films from 20 nations, 12 Latin-American Premiers and 13 Mexican Premiers, including Demon, The Wailing, Miruthan, Scare Campaign, Seoul Station, Shut In, The Mermaid and The Thinning.

The 2017 event saw the debut of Gigi Saul Guerrero's web series La Quinceanera.

The 2019 event took place October 30 to November 3 and saw Latin premieres for Paco Plaza's Eye for an Eye , Alice Waddington’s feature debut Paradise Hills and Richard Elfman's Aliens, Clowns & Geeks. Juan Diego Escobar Alzate's film Luz won the Calavera de Plata at the festival while the Golden Skull / Audience Award went to Colour out of Space by Richard Stanley.

The 2022 edition took place October 26 to November 2 at Teatro de la Ciudad and featured 79 short films and 30 feature-length films, including Huesera: The Bone Woman and Satanic Hispanics.

The 2024 edition took place October 30 to November 10. It showcased 100 short films and 52 feature films from around the world. After winning at the festival, Cinema Management Group acquired sales for 2024 Peruvian found footage horror movie The Devil’s Teardrop.
