= Fantaspoa =

Genre film festival in Brazil

- Location: Porto Alegre, Brazil
- Founded: 2005
- Festival date: Annually in April
- Language: Portuguese; International
- Website: fantaspoa.com

Fantaspoa is an international film festival held annually in Porto Alegre, Brazil. Established in 2005, it focuses on genre cinema, including fantasy, science fiction and horror, and showcases both feature-length and short films, with a focus on Portuguese and Spanish language productions.

== History ==
Fantaspoa was founded in 2005, and has the following official sections: Short Film Competition (subdivided into live-action/animation and national/international); Ibero-American Feature Film Competition and International Competition. The festival also have special sidebars that change from edition to edition, such as animated feature films, documentaries, zombie films, panorama, among others.

Each edition, the festival grants around twenty awards in the different sections, as well as the Lifetime Achievement Award, that has been presented to some of the greatest auteurs of the fantastic genre, such as Luigi Cozzi, Lamberto Bava, Ruggero Deodato, Claudio Simonetti, Stuart Gordon, David Schmoeller, Frank Henenlotter, Lloyd Kaufman and Simon Boswell.

Fantaspoa is the only South American member of the Méliès International Festivals Federation and the only festival outside Europe that awards the Méliès d'Argent for Best European Short Film and Best European Feature Film.

== Reception ==
Described by Deadline and Variety as the largest genre film festival in South America and Latin America, Fantaspoa has also been included in the following lists:

- MovieMaker
  - "50 Film Festivals Worth the Entry Fee" (2023, 2024, 2025, 2026)
  - "The 25 Coolest Film Festivals in the World" (2023)
  - "50 Best Genre Fests in the World" (2021)
  - "30 Bloody Best Genre Fests in the World" (2019)
- Dread Central
  - "The 90 Best Genre Film Festivals on Earth" (2025)
  - "Best Horror Festivals in the World" (2021, 2022)

== See also ==
- List of fantastic and horror film festivals
