= Offscreen Film Festival =

Film festival in Brussels, Belgium

The Offscreen Film Festival started in 2008, as an annual international non-competitive film festival organized in Brussels. The festival is intended to create an acquisition, media and exhibition platform for undistributed or rarely screened films and give audiences a chance to (re)discover repertory films, independent audio-visual creations and outsider cinema. New and sometimes unexpected associations between contemporary film and film history are explored by way of thematic programming modules.

Attracting more than 7000 visitors, the festival features cult films, documentaries and genre entries from around the world.

Thematic and retrospective programs have included Freak Cinema (including a Tod Browning retrospective), a tribute to William Castle, Post-apocalyptic Film, Raro Italiano (Italian Genre cinema), Ozploitation, Pink & Violent (Japanese '70s exploitation cinema), a Spaghetti Western retrospective, Outer Space (rare science-fiction from behind the Iron Curtain), a tribute to the Shaw Brothers, Home Sweet Home (a program of Home Invasion & Haunted House films), Camp & Trash Cinema, 100 years Nikkatsu, British Cult Cinema, a Ken Russell retrospective, a tribute to Gisaburō Sugii and more.

== See also ==
- List of fantastic and horror film festivals
