= MovieMaker =

American filmmaking publication founded 1993

MovieMaker Magazine
- Categories: Film, entertainment
- Frequency: Quarterly
- Founder: Tim Rhys
- First issue: 1993; 33 years ago
- Country: United States
- Language: English
- Website: moviemaker.com

MovieMaker is a magazine, website and podcast network focused on the art and business of filmmaking with a special emphasis on independent film and film festivals.

The magazine is published on a quarterly basis, and is known for the annual lists of 50 Film Festivals Worth the Entry Fee and The 25 Coolest Film Festivals in the World, as well as the occasional Word's Best Genre Festivals lists.

== See also ==
- List of film periodicals
