= Scream (franchise) =

American slasher franchise

- Created by: Kevin Williamson
- Original work: Scream (1996)
- Owners: Miramax Films (1–3; 1996–2000); The Weinstein Company (4; 2011); Spyglass Media Group (5 onwards; 2022–present)
- Years: 1996–present

Films and television
- Films: Scream (1996); Scream 2 (1997); Scream 3 (2000); Scream 4 (2011); Scream (2022); Scream VI (2023); Scream 7 (2026)
- Television series: Scream (2015–2019)

Audio
- Soundtracks: Scream (1996); Scream 2; Scream 3; Scream 4; Scream (2015–2016); Scream (2022); Scream VI; Scream 7

Scream is an American slasher franchise that includes seven films, a television series, merchandise, and games. The first four films were directed by Wes Craven. The series was created by Kevin Williamson, who wrote the first two films and the fourth, and returned to direct and co-write the seventh film. Ehren Kruger wrote the third. The fifth and sixth installments were directed by Matt Bettinelli-Olpin and Tyler Gillett, with Guy Busick and James Vanderbilt serving as writers and Williamson returning as executive producer. Busick and Vanderbilt also co-wrote the seventh entry. Dimension Films produced the first four films, while Dimension Television produced the television series. Spyglass Media Group took over the rights from the fifth film onwards, with Paramount Pictures distributing. The film series has grossed over US$1.1 billion at the global box office.

Neve Campbell, Courteney Cox, David Arquette, and Roger L. Jackson (who voices the various Ghostface killers) starred in the first five films, and returned for the seventh. Cox and Jackson also reprised their roles for the sixth film and are the only cast members to feature in all seven films to date, with Cox also being the only actress to appear in seven consecutive films of a horror franchise. Hayden Panettiere stars in the fourth and sixth films, while Melissa Barrera, Jenna Ortega, Mason Gooding, and Jasmin Savoy Brown star in the fifth and sixth, with Gooding and Brown also reprising their roles in the seventh. Jamie Kennedy and Liev Schreiber feature in the first three films, and Marley Shelton appears in the fourth and fifth. Skeet Ulrich stars in the first and cameos in the fifth and sixth installments, Matthew Lillard stars in the first and features in the seventh, Laurie Metcalf stars in the second and cameos in the seventh, Scott Foley stars in the third and cameos in the seventh, and Jack Quaid stars in the fifth and cameos in the sixth. Additionally, Heather Matarazzo makes cameo appearances in the third and fifth films, as does Nancy O'Dell in the second, third and fourth. Having appeared in the iconic opening scene of the first film and on its poster, Drew Barrymore is strongly associated with the franchise. The series has also featured many notable actors making single-film appearances in supporting cast roles or as cameos.

Scream (1996), Scream 2 (1997), Scream (2022), and Scream VI (2023) received high praise from critics. Scream 3 (2000) received a more mixed response, as did Scream 4 (2011), Craven's final film; both were later reappraised and the fourth film was generally seen as a return to form for the series. Meanwhile, Scream 7 (2026) received mostly negative reviews from critics but became the highest grossing movie in the franchise. Commercially, all the films have been high performers at the box office apart from Scream 4, which had a disappointing domestic run. The film series has also been the recipient of several awards and nominations, including winning Best Movie twice at the MTV Movie & TV Awards (for Scream in 1996 and Scream VI in 2023). An eighth film is in early development.

== Overview ==
The first four films follow Sidney Prescott and her struggle against a succession of murderers who adopt the guise of Ghostface to stalk and kill their victims, the killers often motivated by revenge, jealousy, and seeking notoriety. Sidney receives support from town policeman Dewey Riley, tabloid reporter Gale Weathers, and film-geeks Randy Meeks and Kirby Reed, along with various other friends, romantic partners, and acquaintances that change as the series progresses. The fifth and sixth films follow Samantha Carpenter and her sister, Tara, who are targeted due to their connection to the original killers. Together with their friends Mindy and Chad Meeks-Martin (niece and nephew of Randy Meeks) and some of the original survivors (including Sidney, Gale, Dewey, and Kirby), they must contend with new Ghostface killers. The focus switches back to Sidney in the seventh film, alongside Gale, Mindy, and Chad, and also follows Sidney's daughter, Tatum, and her group of friends, who are all stalked by a new killer.

The first film, Scream, was released on December 20, 1996, and became the highest-grossing slasher film in the world until the release of Halloween (2018). The second entry, Scream 2, was released less than a year later on December 12, 1997. The third installment, Scream 3, was released on February 4, 2000, and was originally the concluding chapter of the series. Eleven years later, the franchise was revived with a fourth installment, Scream 4, which was released on April 15, 2011. An anthology television series Scream, which followed new characters and settings and is not canon to the films, aired for three seasons from 2015 to 2016 on MTV and on VH1 in 2019. A fifth installment in the film series was released on January 14, 2022, directed by Bettinelli-Olpin and Gillett. Busick and Vanderbilt wrote the screenplay, and original creator Williamson returned as an executive producer. It is the first installment in the film series to not be directed by Wes Craven, who died in 2015. A sixth installment, Scream VI, was released on March 10, 2023, developed by the same directors and screenwriters as the fifth film.

Williamson's original script for the first film was bought by Miramax and developed under the Dimension Films label. Craven recruited composer Marco Beltrami to score the film. Williamson was unable to write Scream 3 due to his commitment to other projects. Ehren Kruger replaced him as screenwriter. Kruger also provided uncredited rewrites for Scream 4. Craven ran into conflicts with the Motion Picture Association of America over the series and was forced to reduce the violence in Scream 3 due to the Columbine High School massacre resulting in increased focus on violence in the media. Scream became notable for its use of established and recognizable actors, which was uncommon for slasher films at the time.

The first film has been credited with revitalizing the horror genre in the late 1990s by combining a traditional slasher film with humor, characters aware of horror film cliches and a clever plot. It was one of the highest-grossing films of 1996 and became the highest-grossing slasher film in the world, an honor it held until it was surpassed by 2018's Halloween. Its success was matched by Scream 2, which not only broke box-office records of the time but was also considered superior to the original by some critics. Scream 3 fared worse than its predecessors critically, with many reviewers commenting that it had become the type of horror film it originally parodied in Scream and Scream 2, while others praised it for successfully completing the film trilogy. The movie and its themes were re-evaluated in the wake of the MeToo movement and it underwent a positive reappraisal in the years since its release. Scream 4 also received mixed reviews, with criticism mainly aimed at its use of horror film cliches, although many considered it an improvement over its predecessor. Like the third film, it was critically reappraised years after its release. Both films, especially Scream 4 and its killers' motives, are now widely seen as being ahead of their time. The fifth and sixth entries received mostly positive reviews. Collider said the franchise worked so well because at heart it is really a mystery series.

== Films ==
Film	U.S. release date	Director(s)	Screenwriter(s)	Story by	Producers
Scream	December 20, 1996	Wes Craven	Kevin Williamson	Kevin Williamson	Cary Woods, Harvey Weinstein, & Cathy Konrad
Scream 2	December 12, 1997	Wes Craven	Kevin Williamson	Kevin Williamson	Wes Craven, Cathy Konrad, Harvey Weinstein, & Marianne Maddalena
Scream 3	February 4, 2000	Wes Craven	Ehren Kruger	Ehren Kruger	Cathy Konrad, Kevin Williamson, Harvey Weinstein, & Marianne Maddalena
Scream 4	April 15, 2011	Wes Craven	Kevin Williamson	Kevin Williamson	Wes Craven, Iya Labunka, & Kevin Williamson
Scream	January 14, 2022	Matt Bettinelli-Olpin & Tyler Gillett	James Vanderbilt & Guy Busick	James Vanderbilt & Guy Busick	Paul Neinstein, William Sherak & James Vanderbilt
Scream VI	March 10, 2023	Matt Bettinelli-Olpin & Tyler Gillett	James Vanderbilt & Guy Busick	James Vanderbilt & Guy Busick	Paul Neinstein, William Sherak & James Vanderbilt
Scream 7	February 27, 2026	Kevin Williamson	Kevin Williamson and Guy Busick	James Vanderbilt & Guy Busick	Paul Neinstein, William Sherak & James Vanderbilt
Untitled eighth Scream film	TBA	TBA	Lilla Zuckerman & Nora Zuckerman	TBA	TBA

=== Scream (1996) ===
The film series began with Scream, premiering on December 18, 1996, at the AMC Avco theater in Westwood, California and was generally released on December 20, 1996. Based on a screenplay by screenwriter Kevin Williamson and directed by Wes Craven, creator of the A Nightmare on Elm Street franchise, Scream offered a self-referential approach to horror by featuring a cast of characters aware of the conventions/clichés of the horror film genre and able to use them to survive. The film focuses on teenager Sidney Prescott as she comes under attack from a mysterious character dubbed Ghostface while dealing with the anniversary of her mother's murder. The film went on to be a financial success and received considerable critical acclaim for its deconstruction of the horror genre. It is credited with revitalizing the horror genre in the mid 90s and inspiring an array of imitators. It was particularly notable for its casting of established and popular actors and actresses which was previously uncommon in horror films.

=== Scream 2 (1997) ===
The series continued with Scream 2, premiering at Mann's Chinese Theater, followed by a general release on December 12, 1997. Written by Williamson and directed by Craven, released less than a year after the original film. Like Scream, the film features characters aware of the horror genre and the conventions of the horror sequel, mocking them while simultaneously falling victim to them. Set in 1997, the film again focuses on the character of Sidney Prescott, now a college student, as a series of copycat crimes begin, the killers again using the disguise of Ghostface. The film was financially successful, and received similar critical praise for its deconstruction of the horror film sequel and commentary on the influence of the media in society. The script for Scream 2 was leaked during production revealing the identity of the killers and so the film underwent extensive rewrites, changing the identity of the killers, though their motivation remained the same.

=== Scream 3 (2000) ===
The series continued with Scream 3, which premiered on February 3, 2000, at the AMC Avco theater in Westwood, California and was generally released on February 4, 2000. Like previous entries, the film was directed by Craven, but Williamson was unable to formulate a complete script due to his commitment to the short-lived television series Wasteland and his original film Teaching Mrs. Tingle (1999). Consequently, he wound up being replaced by Ehren Kruger who finalized a script based on several ideas supplied by Williamson. Set in 2000, the film focuses on Sidney Prescott who faces a new Ghostface killer and the truth about her mother that led to the start of the Ghostface killings. The film, like its predecessors, featured characters who were self-aware of horror conventions, in this case the rules and structure of the final entry in a movie trilogy. Scream 3 was less successful than the previous two installments, commentators noting that the film had become akin to the horror films it originally parodied in Scream and Scream 2. Others were critical of the change in tone, focusing more on humor instead of horror and violence. However, critics who reacted positively were supportive of this change in tone and praised the film for successfully completing the film trilogy. The movie and its themes were re-evaluated and examined in the wake of the MeToo movement.

=== Scream 4 (2011) ===
In July 2008, The Weinstein Company announced the development of a new sequel, Scream 4, written by Williamson with Craven being secured for the project in March 2010. In May 2010, Cathy Konrad, producer of the original three Scream films filed a US$3 million lawsuit against The Weinstein Company alleging they violated an agreement with her company, Cat Entertainment, that gave them first rights to produce all Scream films. The Weinstein Company argued that the agreement requires Konrad's services to be exclusive to the franchise, an argument that Konrad called "false pretext" as the previous films did not make this stipulation. Konrad accused the Weinsteins of attempting to force her to walk away without compensation in order to hire a cheaper producer (Craven's wife Iya Labunka) and cut costs. In April 2011, it was reported that the case had been settled out of court by The Weinstein Company.

The film underwent reshoots of some scenes in January 2011 with Craven stating that they were to enhance some scenes but that the ending remains untouched, countering criticism that, following a January 6, 2011 test screening, the film may undergo significant changes due to poor audience responses. The fourth installment premiered on April 11, 2011, at Grauman's Chinese Theater with a general release on April 15, 2011. The film takes place eleven years after the previous film, and once again follows Sidney Prescott as she returns to Woodsboro, the fictional town where Scream takes place, on the last stop of her book tour and encounters another set of murders and a killer, again using the guise of Ghostface.

=== Scream (2022) ===
In 2011, Craven confirmed he was contracted to work on a fifth and sixth installment of the Scream franchise, to be made if the fourth film achieved a successful release and reception. Williamson also stated he had contractual obligations for scripts for Scream 4 and Scream 5, having submitted concepts for three films leading up to Scream 6, though his contract for the sixth film had not yet been finalized. Williamson indicated that if a Scream 5 were to be made, it would be a continuation of the story of the characters who lived through Scream 4 but that Scream 4 would not include any cliffhangers that led into the potential sequel.

Before the release of Scream 4, actor David Arquette also added his support for a potential future of the franchise. In February 2012, when asked about the potential for making Scream 5, Williamson stated at the time that he did not know if it would be made, saying "I'm not doing it."

On September 30, 2013, Harvey Weinstein expressed his interest in a fifth installment. Two years later in June 2015, the Washington Street Journal reported Bob Weinstein, when asked about the possibility of a film continuation after Scream 4, firmly denied the possibility of a fifth installment or any further continuation of the film franchise, citing the MTV television series as the right place for the franchise to find new life. But after the death of Craven in 2015 and the sexual misconduct allegations against Harvey Weinstein shut down the Weinstein Company, the series's future was in limbo.

However, in early 2019, it was reported that Blumhouse Productions was interested in reviving the series, and that head of studio Jason Blum was working on making such Scream installments happen. In November 2019, Spyglass Media Group acquired the rights to make a new Scream film. The next month, it was announced that the film would feature a new cast but could possibly feature appearances from previous main cast members.

In March 2020, it was announced that Matt Bettinelli-Olpin and Tyler Gillett would direct the fifth installment, with Williamson serving as an executive producer, and that the film had already entered official development, with filming planned to begin in May 2020. That same month, it was announced David Arquette would be reprising his role of Dewey Riley for the fifth film; James Vanderbilt and Guy Busick were announced as additional writers. In June 2020, Variety reported that the film would be distributed by Paramount Pictures and was initially aiming for a 2021 release, which would be 25 years since the first movie was released in 1996. On July 31, 2020, Cox confirmed her return to the franchise for the fifth installment. The news was then confirmed by various other outlets. In August 2020, Melissa Barrera and Jenna Ortega were cast in undisclosed roles. In the same month, Paramount Pictures announced that the film is scheduled to be released on January 14, 2022, having been delayed from its original 2021 tentative release due to the COVID-19 pandemic. In September 2020, Jack Quaid joined the cast in an undisclosed role. In the same month, it was confirmed that Neve Campbell and Marley Shelton would return to reprise their roles with Dylan Minnette, Mason Gooding, Kyle Gallner, Jasmin Savoy Brown, Mikey Madison, and Sonia Ben Ammar joining the cast. Filming began on September 22, 2020. In November 2020, Williamson confirmed that the film's official title would simply be Scream.

Scream was released on January 14, 2022, by Paramount Pictures.

=== Scream VI (2023) ===
After Campbell and the fifth film's directors expressed interest in making future films in the series, a sixth installment was officially greenlit on February 3, 2022, with the same creative team returning and with production slated to begin in mid-2022 in Montreal, Canada. In March 2022, it was announced that Courteney Cox would reprise her role as Gale Weathers. On May 10, 2022, it was announced that Melissa Barrera, Jasmin Savoy Brown, Mason Gooding, and Jenna Ortega would also return for the sixth film. The following day, it was announced that Hayden Panettiere would reprise her role of Kirby Reed from the fourth film. On June 3, 2022, Dermot Mulroney joined the cast. On June 6, 2022, it was announced Campbell would not be returning as Sidney Prescott for the sixth film. The actress made a statement about how her contract and salary negotiations had stalled with Paramount; she said, "As a woman I have had to work extremely hard in my career to establish my value, especially when it comes to Scream. I felt the offer that was presented to me did not equate to the value I have brought to the franchise."

=== Scream 7 (2026) ===
In 2023, Scream (2022) and Scream VI directors Matt Bettinelli-Olpin and Tyler Gillet were "hopeful" for a seventh film in the series. They also stated that they wanted Campbell to return in future installments.

In August 2023, it was announced Christopher Landon was set to direct the seventh film. Production had been slowed by the 2023 SAG-AFTRA strike and 2023 Writers Guild of America strike; plans were pushed back again on November 21, 2023, when Melissa Barrera was fired from the film for social media posts in support of Palestine during the Gaza war, which were interpreted as antisemitic by the producers. The next day, it was announced that Jenna Ortega was not returning due to scheduling conflicts with filming the Netflix series Wednesday, though later sources said it was due to a salary dispute with Spyglass Media Group. Ortega spoke out in 2025, stating that her leaving the project "had nothing to do with pay or scheduling" but rather the losses of Barrera, Bettinelli-Olpin and Gillet.

Landon announced on December 23, 2023, that he was no longer associated with the sequel. According to Landon, his voluntary exit from the film happened about a week after Barrera's firing. He believed that, at that point, "there was no movie anymore" because the original script was centered around Barrera's character, Sam Carpenter.

In March 2024, Neve Campbell announced she would return as Sidney Prescott for the seventh film. Kevin Williamson was additionally announced as the film's director. In October 2024, Paramount announced Scream 7 would be released on February 27, 2026. Courteney Cox's return was confirmed in December. In December 2024, it was announced that Mason Gooding and Jasmin Savoy Brown would repreise their roles from Scream (2022) and Scream VI. In March 2025, it was announced that David Arquette would appear in the film and reprise his role as Dewey Riley.

The film was released in the United States on February 27, 2026, by Paramount Pictures. It was the first Scream film to be released in IMAX.

=== Future ===
With the successful box office performance of Scream 7, talks began in March 2026 on the development of a possible eighth film. On March 31, 2026, it was announced that Paramount and Spyglass were moving forward with the development of an eighth film, with sisters Lilla and Nora Zuckerman penning the script. In November 2026, Campbell announced she would return as Sidney for her seventh time in the franchise.

== Television ==
On June 4, 2012, it was reported that MTV was in the early stages of developing a weekly television series spun off from the Scream franchise. David Arquette stated on Twitter that he would not be a part of the television series. On April 25, 2013, The Hollywood Reporter confirmed that MTV had greenlit the TV series, with Craven in talks about directing the pilot. On July 26, 2013, it was reported that Criminal Minds writers Jay Beattie and Dan Dworkin had been recruited to write the pilot script. On April 2, 2014, it was reported that the show would be penned by Jill Blotevogel (Ravenswood, Eureka and Harper's Island), and would focus on a YouTube video gone viral which would have adverse repercussions for teenagers of Lakewood and serve as the "catalyst for a murder that opens up a window to the town's troubled past". The lead actors are Willa Fitzgerald, Bex Taylor-Klaus, Bobby Campo, Connor Weil, Carlson Young, Amadeus Serafini and John Karna.

On April 12, 2015, the first trailer for the series was aired during the 2015 MTV Movie Awards presented by Bella Thorne, also revealing the final premiere date of the series, which aired on June 30, 2015. An official promotional picture of the series' re-imagined mask was revealed in early June 2015. Initially, Craven expressed his approval of the redesign and hinted at its origins and possible plot significance. However, Craven was later critical about the network's decision to abandon the Ghostface mask in the television series.

On August 30, 2015, Wes Craven died of brain cancer. The first-season finale, "Revelations", included a tribute to him during the opening credits. The second season of Scream premiered on May 30, 2016.

On October 14, 2016, MTV renewed the Scream television series for a six-episode third season. On April 26, 2017, MTV announced that they would be rebooting the series with the third season instead of completing the original storyline, with a new cast and setting. As part of the reboot process, it was revealed that Brett Matthews will be serving as the main showrunner. In addition, Matthews, Queen Latifah, Shakim Compere and Yaneley Arty will be added as executive producers for the series under Flavor Unit Entertainment. On July 19, 2017, The Hollywood Reporter announced that the series would transition into an anthology series following the third season if it was a success, information corroborated by MTV president Chris McCarthy. The new cast members for the season are RJ Cyler, C. J. Wallace, Tyga, Keke Palmer, Jessica Sula, Giullian Yao Gioiello, Giorgia Whigham and Tyler Posey.

On September 18, 2017, it was announced that the Ghostface mask from the film series would be making an appearance in the third season. On October 10, 2017, Keke Palmer confirmed in an interview that Roger L. Jackson, who voiced Ghostface in the film series, would return for the third season, replacing Mike Vaughn, who served as the voice for two characters, the Lakewood Slasher in the first two seasons and the Shallow Grove Slasher in the Halloween special episodes of the second season.

After the second season, the series moved from MTV to VH1. The third and final season, subtitled "Resurrection", premiered on VH1 from July 8 to 10, 2019.

== Recurring cast and characters ==
List indicators

This section includes characters who will appear or have appeared in two or more releases in the franchise.

- An empty grey cell indicates the character was not in the film, or that the character's official presence has not yet been confirmed.
- ^{A} indicates an appearance through archival footage or audio.
- ^{C} indicates a cameo role.
- ^{E} indicates an appearance not included in the theatrical cut.
- ^{G} indicates a guest appearance in the season.
- ^{M} indicates an appearance in onscreen movie footage.
- ^{O} indicates an older version of the character.
- ^{P} indicates an appearance in onscreen photographs.
- ^{R} indicates a recurring role in the season.
- ^{U} indicates an uncredited appearance.
- ^{V} indicates a voice-only role.
- ^{Y} indicates a younger version of the character.

Character	Films								Television series		
Character	Scream	Scream 2	Scream 3	Scream 4	Scream	Scream VI	Scream 7	Scream			
Character	1996	1997	2000	2011	2022	2023	2026	Season 1 2015	Season 2 2016	Season 3: Resurrection 2019	
Ghostface	Roger L. Jackson^{V} (Note: Also voiced by Beth Toussaint, Neve Campbell, Liev Schreiber, Courteney Cox, David Arquette, and Lynn McRee during Scream 3)	Roger L. Jackson^{V}	Roger L. Jackson^{V}	Roger L. Jackson^{V}	Roger L. Jackson^{V}	Roger L. Jackson^{V}	Roger L. Jackson^{V}				Roger L. Jackson^{V}
Sidney Prescott	Neve Campbell	Neve Campbell	Neve Campbell	Neve Campbell	Neve Campbell		Neve Campbell				
Gale Weathers	Courteney Cox	Courteney Cox	Courteney Cox	Courteney Cox	Courteney Cox	Courteney Cox	Courteney Cox				
Dewey Riley	David Arquette	David Arquette	David Arquette	David Arquette	David Arquette		David Arquette^{C}^{M}				
Randy Meeks	Jamie Kennedy	Jamie Kennedy	Jamie Kennedy^{C}^{M}								
Cotton Weary	Liev Schreiber^{C}^{M}	Liev Schreiber	Liev Schreiber								
Billy Loomis	Skeet Ulrich				Skeet Ulrich^{C}	Skeet Ulrich^{C}					
Stu Macher	Matthew Lillard						Matthew Lillard^{M}				
Neil Prescott	Lawrence Hecht		Lawrence Hecht^{C}								
Hank Loomis	C. W. Morgan		C. W. Morgan^{C}^{M}								
Casey Becker	Drew Barrymore	Heather Graham^{C}^{M}									
Maureen Prescott	Lynn McRee^{C}^{P}^{U}	Lynn McRee^{C}^{P}^{U}	Lynn McRee^{P}^{M}								
Reporter		Nancy O'Dell^{C}^{M}	Nancy O'Dell^{C}^{M}	Nancy O'Dell^{C}^{M}							
Nancy Loomis		Laurie Metcalf					Laurie Metcalf^{C}^{M}				
Martha Meeks			Heather Matarazzo		Heather Matarazzo^{C}						
Roman Bridger			Scott Foley				Scott Foley^{C}^{M}				
Kirby Reed				Hayden Panettiere	Hayden Panettiere^{P} (Note: Panettiere received a "special thanks" in Scream (2022).)	Hayden Panettiere					
Judy Hicks				Marley Shelton	Marley Shelton						
Sam Carpenter					Melissa Barrera	Melissa Barrera					
Tara Carpenter					Jenna Ortega	Jenna Ortega					
Chad Meeks-Martin					Mason Gooding	Mason Gooding	Mason Gooding				
Mindy Meeks-Martin					Jasmin Savoy Brown	Jasmin Savoy Brown	Jasmin Savoy Brown				
Richie Kirsch					Jack Quaid	Jack Quaid^{C}^{M}^{U}					
Lakewood Slasher Shallow Grove Slasher									Mike Vaughn^{V}	Mike Vaughn^{V}	
Emma Duval									Willa Fitzgerald Karsyn Darby^{Y} Madison Wolfe^{Y}	Willa Fitzgerald Karsyn Darby^{Y}	
Audrey Jensen									Bex Taylor-Klaus	Bex Taylor-Klaus	
Noah Foster									John Karna	John Karna	
Kieran Wilcox									Amadeus Serafini	Amadeus Serafini	
Brooke Maddox									Carlson Young	Carlson Young	
Maggie Duval									Tracy Middendorf Karsyn Darby^{Y} Anna Grace Barlow^{Y}	Tracy Middendorf Caitlin Ashley-Thompson^{Y}	
Jake Fitzgerald									Tom Maden^{R}	Tom Maden^{R}	
Seth Branson									Bobby Campo^{R}	Bobby Campo^{R}	
Quinn Maddox									Bryan Batt^{R}	Bryan Batt^{R}	
Rachel Murray									Sosie Bacon^{R}	Sosie Bacon^{G}	
Kevin Duval									Tom Everett Scott^{G}	Tom Everett Scott^{R}	

== Crew ==
Crew/detail	Films						
Crew/detail	Scream	Scream 2	Scream 3	Scream 4	Scream	Scream VI	Scream 7
Crew/detail	1996	1997	2000	2011	2022	2023	2026
Composer	Marco Beltrami	Marco Beltrami	Marco Beltrami	Marco Beltrami	Brian Tyler	Brian Tyler; Sven Faulconer	Marco Beltrami
Cinematographer	Mark Irwin	Peter Deming	Peter Deming	Peter Deming	Brett Jutkiewicz	Brett Jutkiewicz	Ramsey Nickell
Editor	Patrick Lussier	Patrick Lussier	Patrick Lussier	Peter McNulty	Michel Aller	Jay Prychidny	Jim Page
Production company	Woods Entertainment	Konrad Pictures; Craven/Maddalena Films	Konrad Pictures; Craven/Maddalena Films	Corvus Corax Productions; Outerbanks Entertainment; The Weinstein Company	Radio Silence Productions; Project X Entertainment; Spyglass Media Group		Spyglass Media Group; Project X Entertainment
Distributor	Dimension Films	Dimension Films	Dimension Films	Dimension Films	Paramount Pictures	Paramount Pictures	Paramount Pictures

Craven initially intended to hire talented, but relatively unknown actors who had not yet had a "big break" in the film industry, as he had done with A Nightmare on Elm Street's Johnny Depp and Shocker's Peter Berg. However, the decision was made to cast actors who already had a notable body of work, marking a change from many previous horror films where casting current, popular actors was unheard of. Craven believed their budget was inadequate to secure the actors they were pursuing but felt that Drew Barrymore's presence made people eager to take part and accepting of a lower salary.

Barrymore initially approached the production herself after reading the script and was signed to play Sidney Prescott. However, as time progressed, her schedule commitments meant she would be unable to remain in the leading role, so she volunteered to play the smaller role of Casey Becker who dies early in the film. The production felt that killing off an actress of Barrymore's stature early on would be a risk but thought that it would be shocking to the audience and make them believe that no other character was safe. Following Barrymore's changed role, Alicia Witt and Brittany Murphy auditioned for the lead and the production also considered contacting Reese Witherspoon. The role was ultimately given to Neve Campbell after the director saw her in Party of Five, believing she could best embody a character who was "innocent" but also able to handle herself while dealing with the physicality and emotions of the role. Though reluctant to undertake another horror film so soon after The Craft, Campbell chose to do Scream as it would be her first leading role and she adored the character, saying "She's a fantastic character for any kind of movie." The production wanted a recognizable face for the role of news reporter Gale Weathers, offering it to both Brooke Shields and Janeane Garofalo. Cox, who was starring in the hit NBC sitcom Friends at the time, was not considered due to her history of playing softer, kinder characters. Cox however lobbied hard for the role for that reason, wishing to play a "bitch" character, her efforts ultimately succeeding when she was cast. Actresses Melinda Clarke and Rebecca Gayheart auditioned for the role of Tatum Riley before Rose McGowan was cast due to her best embodying the "spunky" nature of the character. It was believed the collective strong female cast of Campbell, Barrymore, Cox and McGowan would help draw a significant female audience to the film.

Kevin Patrick Walls, who played Barrymore's boyfriend Steve Orth in the opening of Scream, was one of the final candidates for the role of Sidney's boyfriend, Billy Loomis, alongside Justin Whalin before it was won by Skeet Ulrich. Campbell and Ulrich had a prior working relationship on The Craft which they believed help them better develop the relationship between Sidney and Billy. David Arquette was also approached for the role of Billy Loomis but instead wanted the role of Dewey. The role was described as "hunky" instead of the younger, "goofier" approach of Arquette but Craven appreciated the idea and cast him in the role. Matthew Lillard was cast by chance as he had accompanied his then-girlfriend to a separate audition where Scream casting director Lisa Beach saw him and asked him to audition, where he secured the role of Stu Macher. The role of Randy Meeks was contested between Jamie Kennedy and Breckin Meyer with the production favoring Kennedy. Having no major role prior to Scream, the studio wanted a more prominent actor than Kennedy in the role but the production were adamant that he was the best choice and successfully fought to keep him in. Roger L. Jackson, voice of the character Ghostface, was picked at the end of several weeks of local casting in Santa Rosa. The production had originally intended to only use his voice temporarily but ultimately decided that it was perfect for the role. He was intentionally kept from meeting many members of the cast in all three original Scream films as it was thought it would help their performance if they could not put a face to the menacing voice. The calls made by his character were genuine phone calls conducted on set by Jackson to the characters, again with the intention of aiding the interaction between his character and the character being "stalked" in a scene. Craven commented, on Jackson's contribution to the film, "I can't imagine Scream without Ghostface ... Roger Jackson's voice is very remarkable, it's got an evil sophistication."

For Scream 2, Campbell had been contracted for a possible sequel before filming began on Scream. However actors with surviving characters had a sequel option added after it was known which character would be eligible to appear in the next film. In interviews, the production staff of Scream 2 stated they believed that Barrymore's role in Scream added an element of respectability to the genre that made actors normally reluctant to engage a horror film, eager to sign on to Scream 2. Many of the actors involved including Campbell, Cox, Sarah Michelle Gellar and Jerry O'Connell were starring in their own television series at the time making scheduling their availability with the film difficult. Gellar in particular had also recently finished work on another Williamson-penned film, I Know What You Did Last Summer (1997) which was released two months prior to Scream 2. She would admit in interviews that she signed on to Scream 2 without having read the script, based on the success of the first film. Craven took their desire to participate in the film despite their workload as a compliment to the film's quality. To obtain the role of Derek, O'Connell and other candidates had to audition by performing a scene from the film where the character sings "I Think I Love You". The cast was rounded out by Laurie Metcalf, who had just finished a nine-year run on the popular sitcom Roseanne, Lewis Arquette, father of David Arquette, Jada Pinkett and Timothy Olyphant in what was his first leading role in a feature film. Rebecca Gayheart, who had unsuccessfully auditioned to play Tatum Riley in Scream, auditioned for the roles of Hallie, Cici and Maureen Evans before being cast as Sorority Sister Lois.

For Scream 3, Craven stated in an interview that convincing the central cast to return was not difficult but their burgeoning fame and busy schedules made arranging their availability with the film's production troublesome. Campbell in particular was only available for 20 days of filming which resulted in a significantly reduced role for her character and a focus on Cox and Arquette's characters. Emily Mortimer was cast as Angelina Tyler but shortly after filming began it was discovered she lacked the required permit to work, resulting in her being flown to Vancouver to obtain one. Carrie Fisher made a cameo in the film at the suggestion of Bob Weinstein and Fisher helped write her character. Kelly Rutherford was cast after filming had begun as the production was undergoing constant rewrites and the opening scene evolved from requiring only a female corpse to needing a live actress with whom Schreiber could interact. In a 2009 interview, Matthew Lillard, who played Stu Macher in Scream, claimed that he was signed to reprise his role in Scream 3 as the primary antagonist but after the script moved in a direction without his character, he was bought out of his contract.

When production of Scream 4 was announced, Campbell initially refused offers to reprise her role as Sidney, forcing early script drafts to be written in consideration of her absence. However, in September 2009, Campbell, Cox and Arquette were all confirmed as reprising their roles as Sidney, Gale and Dewey respectively, with Jackson's commitment confirmed in July 2010. Continuing the trend started in Scream, the production cast established and popular actors Hayden Panettiere, Rory Culkin, Anna Paquin, Kristen Bell and Emma Roberts. Roberts was cast as Jill, Sidney Prescott's cousin, beating out Ashley Greene for the role. Lake Bell and Lauren Graham were cast in the film but dropped out early into production, Bell citing scheduling conflicts. Nico Tortorella auditioned five times to secure the role of Trevor, the ex-boyfriend of Roberts' character, by reenacting a scene from Scream where the character of Billy Loomis reveals he is one of the killers.

== Production ==
=== Writing ===
Scream (1996) was conceived under the title Scary Movie by screenwriter Kevin Williamson as an 18-page script inspired by a series of murders by the Gainesville Ripper that Williamson had seen in a news story and his own experience alone in a friend's house, after discovering an open window he had not previously noticed. The treatment covered what would become the opening scene of Scream featuring Drew Barrymore. Williamson began to expand this script into what ultimately became Scream because his previous script, Teaching Mrs. Tingle, was in development hell, writing it in only three days in Palm Springs and bringing it to his agent in June 1995 to put it up for sale. Accompanying the script were two 5-page outlines for potential sequels to the film, Williamson hoping to provide added incentive to buy the script by providing potential for a franchise. Williamson would later claim he wrote the screenplay partly because it was a film he wanted to watch and "nobody else is making it". The script was self-referential, featuring characters who watched horror films and were aware of the conventions of the genre and featured numerous homages to many preceding horror films which Williamson would claim inspired him, including Halloween, Friday the 13th, A Nightmare on Elm Street and Prom Night.

Williamson was told early on by his agent, Rob Paris, that the saturation of violence and gore in his script would make it "impossible" to sell and following its purchase by Miramax he was required to remove much of the gorier scenes. However, once Craven was confirmed to direct, he was able to bring much of the excised content back. Williamson intended to remove a scene in the film that took place inside the fictional school's bathroom, feeling it was awkward but Craven salvaged it believing it had potential. Williamson later confirmed that he was glad Craven did so. The death of the character Principal Himbry was added at the request of producer Bob Weinstein who noted that there was thirty pages (thirty on-screen minutes) without a murder occurring. This later aided Williamson who was struggling to find motivation for characters to leave a party in the film's finale, now able to use the discovered corpse of the Himbry character. When writing the finale, Williamson was unsure what to cite as a motivation for the killers or whether to give them one at all. Opinions were split between staff on the picture, some who felt that a motive was necessary for the audience to be given resolution while others felt it was scarier without one. Ultimately Williamson decided to do both, giving the character Billy Loomis the motive of maternal abandonment while not giving the character of Stu Macher one, instead having the character jokingly suggest "peer pressure".

Following the release of Scream, Williamson confirmed that he had considered a concept for a sequel where the character Sidney Prescott attends college and a copycat killer begins stalking her. Dimension Films agreed to pursue a sequel in May 1997, by which point Williamson had already written 42 pages of the new script. By July 1997, filming began on Scream 2, but his completed script was leaked on the Internet revealing much of the plot including the finale and the identity of the film's killers. As a result, the production was forced to continue filming with only a partial script as Williamson conducted rewrites, changing much of the finale, the killer's victims and the killer's identity. To prevent the identity of the killer or important plot points being revealed again, the actors were not given the last pages of the script until weeks before shooting, and the pages that revealed the killer's identity were only provided on the day the scene was shot. The short production schedule on Scream 2 and his work on other projects meant that Williamson's final script used for the film was detailed in some areas but lacking in others, the intention being for Craven to fill out these scenes on set.

Williamson was approached by Bob and Harvey Weinstein in early 1999 to pen a script for Scream 3 but at the time he was involved with the writing and directing of his original script Teaching Mrs. Tingle and developing the short-lived TV series Wasteland. Unable to write a full script, Williamson provided a draft outline for the film that involved the filming of the film within a film "Stab 3", based on the previous film's in-universe murders, that took place in the fictional town of Woodsboro from the original Scream. Arlington Road scribe Ehren Kruger was brought into the production by the Weinstein brothers to develop a script using Williamson's notes, though Kruger admitted that without having been involved with the characters in the previous two films he struggled to write them true to character. Early scripts by Kruger had the character of Sidney Prescott much like "Linda Hamilton in Terminator 2" at which point Craven would intervene to bring the character closer to previous iterations. Kruger admits that Craven had a hand in writing the script though he remained uncredited for it. Kruger's script would differ in many ways from Williamson's original including the removal of one of the killers and the inclusion of the death of Cotton Weary who was originally absent from the film. Additionally, the film's location changed from Woodsboro to Hollywood as Kruger believed that the characters should be moving to bigger places from high school, to college to Hollywood. However, there were also considerations that creating a film containing acts of murder in and around the fictional Woodsboro school would receive negative attention following the Columbine High School massacre that occurred less than a year before the film's eventual release. The film was given a greater emphasis on humor over violence and fared worse than previous installments both financially and critically.

Almost ten years after the last installment, in late 2009, Williamson formulated a concept for a new installment and approached Bob Weinstein who, after hearing his pitch, told Williamson to begin writing a script for what would become Scream 4. Campbell initially refused to return to the series for Scream 4 forcing early script drafts to be written in consideration of her characters absence with Cox and Arquette's characters becoming the focus. Early versions of the script involved Campbell's character being attacked and killed in the opening, a key point of contention for Weinstein who had it removed, while another version had Cox and Arquette's characters as parents, but this too was removed as it was believed that them having a child would be unworkable in the context of the film. After Williamson was forced to leave the production due to contractual commitments to The Vampire Diaries, under threat of legal action, controversy arose in July 2010 when Scream 3 writer Ehren Kruger was brought in by Weinstein to perform re-writes on Williamson's script, about which Craven was outspoken on "losing control" of the story. He would later explain that despite rewrites it was still Williamson's characters and script, stating:

Look, there was a bumpy period when things shifted over from Kevin to Ehren. I signed up to do a script by Kevin and unfortunately that didn't go all the way through the shooting. But it certainly is Kevin's script and concept and characters and themes.

Weinstein clarified that Kruger was brought in to "punch up" the film's dialog but his involvement with the writing was not to the same extent as with Scream 3. To preserve the secrecy of the script and the identity of the film's killer, the cast were only provided with 75 pages of the 140-page-long script. Like the two previous installments in the series, the script underwent rewrites often, with pages sometimes only ready on the day of shooting.

=== Development ===
The Fun World "Ghostface" mask as it was first discovered by Marianne Maddalena while scouting the Shadow of a Doubt home

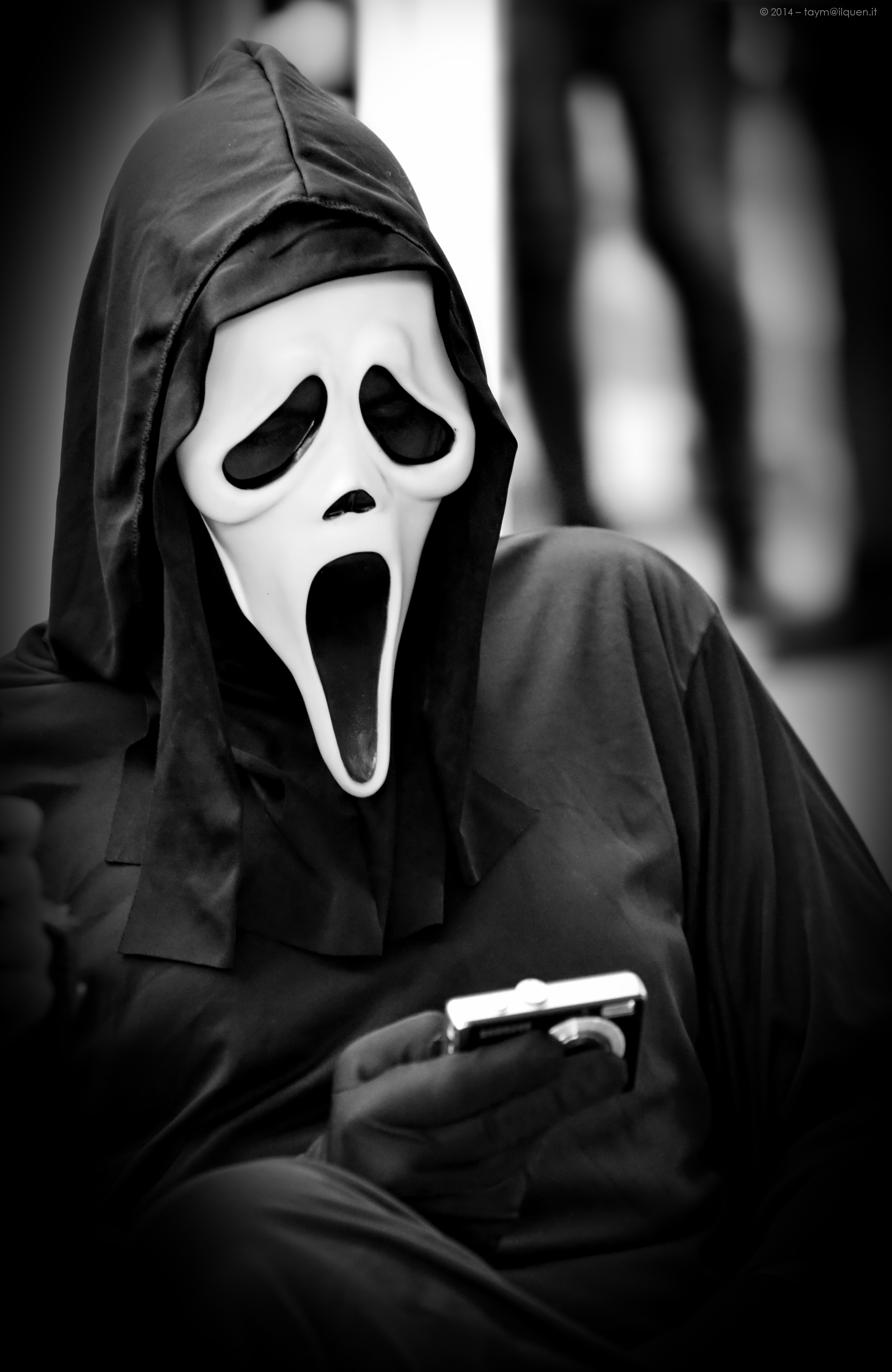
Ghostface (Killer from the Scream franchise)

The script for Scream (1996), then known as Scary Movie was released for sale on a Friday and by 8 a.m. the following Monday had become involved in a significant bidding war from several studios, including Paramount Pictures, Universal Pictures and Morgan Creek, with producer Cathy Konrad bringing it to the attention of Bob Weinstein. The bidding eventually rose to an amount that the choice ultimately came down to Oliver Stone, who was at the time working with Cinergi Pictures, and Weinstein under Miramax. Williamson agreed to terms with Miramax for $400,000 plus a contract for two sequels and a third, unrelated film, believing their label, Dimension Films, would produce Scream immediately and without significant restriction. Wes Craven was approached early on to helm the film but he was occupied with remaking The Haunting and so other directors including Robert Rodriguez, Danny Boyle, George A. Romero and Sam Raimi were approached. Concerns were raised by Williamson and Weinstein when many of the approached directors, having read the script, believed the film to be a comedy, making them reluctant to hire those particular directors, believing they "didn't get it". Craven was approached and passed on the film several times, wanting to move away from the genre, but was enticed once Drew Barrymore became involved, reasoning that it may be different from his previous works if an actress of her recognition was involved. Ultimately the production of The Haunting, at that time, fell through and Craven was able to take over directing duties on the film. Close to the end of the film's production, the Weinstein brothers had the film's title changed from Scary Movie to Scream inspired by the Michael Jackson song of the same name as Bob Weinstein felt "Scary Movie" was not suitable when the film also contained elements of satire and comedy. The change was immediately disliked by both Williamson and Craven who considered it "stupid" but would later remark that it was a positive change.

Following a successful screening with a test audience and Miramax executives, both Williamson and Craven were offered a two-picture contract for sequels to Scream, Williamson already having been offered a three-picture deal by Miramax for unrelated films. Bob Weinstein ordered that the film be released on December 20, 1996, a date others were critical of as it was the Christmas season where seasonal and family films were more prevalent. Weinstein argued this fact was in the film's favor, as it meant that horror fans and teenagers had nothing interesting to watch. When Scream's first weekend takings amounted to only $6 million, it was considered that this release date gamble had failed, but the following week the takings did not drop but increased and continued the following week, leading to a total U.S. gross of over $100 million. As Scream's box-office takings grew, a lawsuit would be filed against Dimension Films by Sony Pictures who claimed that the title Scream was too similar to that of Sony's own film Screamers (1995). The case was settled out of court with the details remaining secret but producer Marianne Maddalena would confirm that the production were able to use the current and potential future titles of Scream 2 and Scream 3.

A sequel was considered in January 1997 after the first film proceeded to gross more than $50 million in its first month. Scream 2 was greenlit with a budget of $24 million, and was released before the first film's anniversary. The production of the film suffered a significant setback when the script was leaked revealing plot details including the identity of the killers, resulting in the script being modified to change many details. In an interview, Craven commented on the rushed schedule for the film, starting in July 1997 with a December release date, with many scenes in the script provided with only a loose outline forcing him to develop scenes on set. Various titles were considered for the sequel at different points in the film's production, including Scream Again, Scream Louder and Scream: The Sequel before the studio decided to simply use Scream 2.

Scream 3 (2000) was released just over two years after Scream 2 with Craven again attached to direct the film on a greatly increased budget of $40 million. Shortly before production began on the film, the Columbine incident occurred and with it came an increased scrutiny on the media and its effect on people, particularly films. There were considerations at the time about whether the studio should continue production of a third installment in the aftermath of the incident but the studio decided to continue, albeit with changes. The studio was much more apprehensive concerning violence and gore in the film than with previous installments with them pressing for a greater emphasis on the series' humor while scaling back on the violence. At one point in the production, the studio demanded that the film feature no blood or on-screen violence but Craven intervened stating that the film should either have the violence present in earlier Scream films or should be called something other than Scream. As with production of Scream, Craven would again state in an interview that issues with censorship and the MPAA made him consider leaving the horror genre.

Production of a new film, Scream 4 (2011) was announced in July 2008 by The Weinstein Company who approached Williamson about formulating a new script, with the intention of creating a new Scream trilogy if the fourth film proved successful. By late 2009, Williamson managed to develop an idea for the film and potential sequels and began work on the script. The film was given a budget of $40 million and the principal cast were signed to the film in September 2009 followed by Craven as director in March 2010. In May 2010, Cathy Konrad, producer on the original three films filed a $3 million lawsuit against The Weinstein Company accusing them of violating an agreement that her company, Cat Entertainment, be given first rights to produce all Scream films in order to cut costs by getting a cheaper producer (Craven's wife Iya Labunka, not named in the suit). In April 2011, it was reported that the Weinsteins had settled out of court with Conrad, the details remaining confidential. The Hollywood Reporter however, claimed that Conrad received a cash payment and entitlement to a percentage of the profits derived from Scream 4. In addition, she was given an executive producer credit on the film. Williamson and Bob Weinstein came into repeated conflict with each other during production with Williamson citing the creative direction of the film as the cause while Weinstein blamed the time constraints on the film's development. Williamson and Weinstein did not speak to each other after Williamson left the production, claiming other responsibilities, and he had not seen the finished version of the film prior to its release.

=== Filming ===
Filming for Scream began on April 15, 1996, and finished on June 8, 1996. Filming was intended to take place in North Carolina, but the location was deemed unsuitable, with scouts unable to find useful locations that would not require extensive building or modification to make fit the requirements of the film. The production instead turned to Vancouver, Washington and Los Angeles before discovering Sonoma County, California, and the areas within it: Santa Rosa, Healdsburg and Tomales Bay. The house used by Barrymore's character is situated on Sonoma Mountain Road opposite the house used in the horror film Cujo (1983). Before filming began, the production approached Santa Rosa High School about using it as Woodsboro High School. The school board insisted on seeing the script and objected to the content of the film's dialog and the foul-mouthed, aggressive character of Principal Himbry. The matter reached local newspapers who also raised criticism but there the production received support from students of the school and local residents who supported the economic benefits of the film's presence and others who defended its First Amendment rights. Opposition to the film came from those who deplored its content of violence against children (teenagers), as the area had suffered the tragic kidnap and murder of Polly Klaas three years prior. The matter resulted in a three-hour debate on the topic scheduled for April 16, one day after filming was to begin. Unwilling to be delayed, Craven began filming as scheduled on April 15, with the opening scene of the film featuring Barrymore which took five days to complete. The result of the Santa Rosa debate was that permission be denied and the production was forced to find another location for the school, ultimately being offered the Sonoma Community Center, which appears as Woodsboro High School in Scream.

For the film's killer, Williamson's script had provided Craven only with the description "masked killer", forcing him and his design team to create the Ghostface costume from scratch to conceal the killer's identity. While awaiting permission from Fun World, creators of the Ghostface mask design, Craven had the design team KNB Effects create an alternative that was used in two scenes before being replaced by the original Fun World design once permission was granted. Bob Weinstein disliked the Ghostface mask, believing it was not "scary", and the studio, upon reviewing the dailies footage of the opening scene, were concerned that it was progressing in a direction they did not want and there was consideration that Craven could ultimately be replaced. To assuage their concerns, the first thirteen minutes of the opening scene were compiled as a workprint, a rough version of the finished film, and upon seeing it, the studio were content to let Craven continue and Weinstein was satisfied that the mask could be scary. The third and final act of the film, set at a house party, was over forty minutes long and shot at a vacant property in Tomales over twenty-one nights. The scene was considered the most difficult to shoot, as it took place entirely in one location, yet featured the individual stories and deaths of multiple characters, and as it was set at night, meant that production had to halt at daybreak.

After filming completed in June, Craven spent two months editing the final product, encountering repeated conflicts with the film rating body MPAA concerning the content of scenes, being forced to tone down or obscure the more intense scenes and violence to avoid an NC-17. Though Dimension Films had previously released NC-17 films, the rating made those films difficult to market and attract an audience and thus they were desperate for a less restrictive R-rating. For an early scene involving the death of the character Casey Becker, Craven lied to the MPAA by claiming he had only one take of the scene and could not replace it with something less intense, in order to keep it in the film. In interviews, Craven indicated that the conflict was enough that, at the time, he was considering leaving the horror genre, stating:

I'm a director who can do something very well but am not allowed to put it on screen. And they ultimately get you, as they did on this one, on intensity. They say, "it's not a specific shot, it's not blood, it's just too intense".

In total, Craven sent eight different cuts of the film to the MPAA before Bob Weinstein intervened and personally contacted the MPAA, believing they misunderstood to which genre Scream belonged. Weinstein explained to the organisation that although he agreed it was intense, it also had comedic elements and satirized its content and was not just a horror film glorifying violence. The MPAA reviewed their decision and granted the film an R-rating.

Production of a sequel, Scream 2, was greenlit in May 1997, with filming beginning on September 17, 1997, with a budget of $24 million and wrapping on October 30, 1997. Filming took place largely in Atlanta, Georgia, over four weeks before moving to Los Angeles. Agnes Scott College in Atlanta and University of California, Los Angeles were used to represent the fictional Windsor College that appears in the film. The opening scene featuring the premiere of the fictional "Stab" film was filmed over three days in the Vista theater on Sunset Drive, Hollywood, the exterior represented by the Rialto Theater in South Pasadena. Due to the large number of extras present in the scene, its details were leaked onto the Internet shortly after filming completed, which Craven cited as the productions first experience of a major plot leak. After his interactions with the MPAA in Scream, Craven sent them a copy of the film that was intentionally much more graphically violent than they were planning to release, featuring Omar Epps' character being stabbed in the ear three times and an extended scene of Randy Meeks' death. Their idea was that the MPAA would force them to remove the content the production already did not want while keeping the content they did. However, the MPAA gave them an R rating for the more violent cut, stating that they felt the message of the film was significant. Following a script leak early into filming, security around the production was significantly increased, with a focus on closed film sets and strict restriction on what personnel could be present during filming and have access to the script, and with all present required to sign non-disclosure agreements. The script was printed on specialty paper to prevent photocopying and was often destroyed after use.

Filming for Scream 3 began on July 6, 1999, in and around Hollywood, Los Angeles, in the areas of San Fernando Valley, Macarthur Park, Beverly Hills, Hollywood Hills and Silverlake, with a $40 million budget and wrapped on September 29, 1999. The isolated home of Campbell's character is situated in Topanga Canyon and Cox's character is introduced in a classroom at UCLA. A scene where Campbell's character is pursued through movie set replicas of locations from Scream was not scripted but the sets were built because Craven knew he wanted to revisit the original film in some way, after which they wrote the scene around the set. Due to the constantly changing script used for the film, which would often be usable on the day of filming, the production filmed large amounts of footage of different variations of the same scenes in order that, should the script again change, they would ideally have a scene they could use without having to film new ones at a later date. In particular, the opening scene had three variants and the three-minute scene featuring the character of Randy Meeks had two-hours of filmed footage. The ending too was refilmed in January 2000, three months after principal photography finished, adding in the character of Mark Kincaid (Patrick Dempsey) and having Campbell's character beaten and then shot by Ghostface after it was decided she defeated him too easily. So in flux was the script that the final scene of the movie was filmed with three variants of Dempsey's character, one with him absent, one with his arm in bandages and one with him in a normal condition as they were unsure of what his fate would be.

Principal photography for Scream 4 began on June 28, 2010, with a budget of $40 million and concluded on September 24, 2010. Filming took place in Michigan in the areas of Ann Arbor, Dearborn, Livonia and Northville. In January 2011, the film underwent an additional four days of filming to reshoot two scenes, following a test screening – the opening scene and a later scene that took place in a parking garage with Alison Brie. Amidst criticism that the reshoots meant the film was in trouble and the result of a negative response from the test audience, director Craven countered:

They're not reshoots, we had a couple test screenings and we saw two scenes where they had moments you could add to and we just saw a spectacular opportunity ... The two scenes were really good, but we saw how they could be spectacular, so we thought, let's just go for it. They were key moments of the script, so we just decided to go back and go for the grand slam on them.

Craven also complimented the film's ending, labeling it "kick-ass" and stated that it remained untouched as part of the reshoot process. In an interview, Craven also highlighted that the script was so long they had filmed many scenes which had to be cut from the final film to reduce its running time.

=== Music ===
The score for the Scream series was provided by Marco Beltrami, starting with Scream in what was his feature film debut. Beltrami was brought onto the production of Scream after Craven's assistant Julie Plec requested input on the now defunct site "Hollywood Cafe", asking for opinions on was "new", "fresh" and "wonderful" and was provided with Beltrami's name by several people. Craven sent for samples of Beltrami's work and was impressed by what he heard, bringing him to the set to view the first thirteen minutes of the film featuring the introduction and murder of the character Casey Becker. Craven had Beltrami produce music based on this scene and then demonstrate it, impressing Craven enough to hire him. For Scream (1996), the decision was made to intentionally use music to raise the tension in scenes where it was unnecessary when the characters were entering a situation where the audience may expect a killer to suddenly appear, only to not deliver on that expectation, part of the film's theme of playing with horror conventions. Craven and editor Patrick Lussier provided Beltrami with advice on how best to deliver the music during scary and tense scenes as Beltrami had no prior experience in developing a horror score. Beltrami intentionally avoided conventional horror score styles and approached the film as a western, taking influence from Ennio Morricone, prolific composer of many western films, in the creation of Scream's music. When scoring a theme for the character of Dewey, Beltrami approached him as a sheriff but also as a "quirky" character, using a Morricone-style guitar accompaniment to maintain the Western approach. An acoustic cover of Blue Öyster Cult's "Don't Fear the Reaper" plays softly in the background to Sidney and Billy's discussion of their relationship, which analyst Jeff Smith describes as:

An ironic comment on the brutality we have just seen in the opening sequence. More importantly, however, the allusion to the Blue Öyster Cult classic recasts the song's title by literalizing its meaning. While the title itself invokes the Reaper as a popular symbol for death, the film presents us with an actual person, who not only dresses as the Grim Reaper but also unleashes homicidal vengeance on the other characters of the film. The irony here, of course, is that Billy himself proves to be one of the film's dual slashers and is, in fact, the "Reaper" to be feared.

The theme tune of Sidney Prescott, entitled "Sidney's Lament", became a signature track for the series, variations of the tune appearing across the score of Scream, Scream 2 and Scream 3. The track features a female choral arrangement expressing "sorrow" concerning the fate of the character. In Scream, Beltrami stated that the voice "spoke" for the character, "lamenting" the loss of her mother. In future films it went on to represent the murders and ensuing trauma inflicted on her. Christian Clemmensen of Filmtracks called the "haunting" vocals of the track the "voice of the franchise". The track "Sid Wears a Dress" features in the finale of Scream 3 where the sorrowful chorus of "Lament" gradually shifts key to represent "hope" for the characters future following the resolution of her storyline in what was then the final film in the series. The female voice would be accompanied by a male addition for the first time in "Pied a Terror" from Scream 3 to represent the brother of the character.

Beltrami returned for Scream 2 (1997), leading the score though there would be a late inclusion by Danny Elfman in the form of the choral track "Cassandra Aria". In addition, excerpts from the score of Broken Arrow by Hans Zimmer appeared in the film, in particular guitar work by Duane Eddy, for the character Dewey, replacing many of the character's related tracks from the original Scream score. Beltrami later explained that the Zimmer piece was used as a scratch track for test screening purposes before the score was finalized. The test audience reaction to it influenced the studio keep the Zimmer piece, reducing "Dewey's Theme", which Beltrami had composed to fill its place, to minor use during more serious scenes involving the character. The Zimmer piece would continue to be used in Scream 3 during scenes concerning the evolving relationship between the characters of Dewey and Gale with Beltrami appropriating and adding his own influence to the piece to blend it into the thematic Scream 3 score.

For Scream 3, Beltrami employed seven orchestrators to aid in scoring the extensive orchestral accompaniment featured in the film's score. Additionally, he experimented with new styles of sound production by recording instruments in abnormal circumstances such as inserting objects into a piano and recording at various velocities to create a distorted, unnatural sound and modifying the results electronically.

== Reception ==
=== Box office performance ===
Film	U.S. release date	Budget	Box office gross			All-time ranking worldwide	Ref.
Film	U.S. release date	Budget	U.S. and Canada	Other territories	Worldwide	All-time ranking worldwide	Ref.
Scream (1996)	December 20, 1996	$14 million	$103,046,663	$69,999,977	$173,046,640	#1,145	
Scream 2	December 12, 1997	$24 million	$101,363,301	$71,000,000	$172,363,301	#1,152	
Scream 3	February 4, 2000	$40 million	$89,143,175	$72,691,101	$161,838,076	#1,245	
Scream 4	April 15, 2011	$40 million	$38,180,928	$58,957,758	$97,138,686	#2,001	
Scream (2022)	January 14, 2022	$24 million	$81,641,405	$57,233,384	$138,874,789	#1,447	
Scream VI	March 10, 2023	$35 million	$108,391,107	$60,672,743	$169,063,850	#1,178	
Scream 7	February 27, 2026	$45 million	$121,935,967	$91,900,000	$213,835,967	#926	
Total		$222 million	$643,702,546	$482,454,963	$1,126,161,309		

To date, the franchise has earned over $1.1 billion worldwide. It became the first slasher franchise to cross the milestone. As of March 2026, it is the sixth highest-grossing horror film franchise. The Scream series, when compared to other top-grossing American horror series—A Nightmare on Elm Street, Child's Play, Friday the 13th, Saw, Halloween, and The Texas Chainsaw Massacre—and adjusting for 2023 inflation, takes fourth place with $779.5 million. Halloween is the highest-grossing horror series in the U.S. at approximately $1.09 billion, with Friday the 13th in second at $908.4 million, and the Nightmare on Elm Street series in third with $793.5 million. The Saw film series is the fifth highest grossing series with $688.3 million. The Texas Chainsaw Massacre series is in sixth with $459.7 million, and the Child's Play film series rounds out the list with $305.2 million.

Before the 2026 release of Scream 7, the original Scream was the most successful of the series, accruing a $173,046,663 gross worldwide and receiving a largely positive critical reception. Scream remained the highest grossing slasher movie of all time until 2018's Halloween was released. Despite competition from other big-name films during its release – including Tom Cruise's Jerry Maguire and Tim Burton's Mars Attacks! – its release date of December 20, during the Christmas season; and Variety labeling it "DOA" before it was even released; Scream became the surprise hit of the year and continued to show in cinemas for nearly eight months.

Scream was closely followed by Scream 2 with less than $1 million separating their respective box-office takings. By late 1998, Scream 2 broke December opening weekend records for its box-office takings in 1997 and held the record until December 15, 2000. Unlike the first two films, Scream 3 was not well received critically and made less domestically at the box office, though still did very well, taking $89.1 million, compared to Scream and Scream 2 with $103 million and $101.1 million respectively. The takings of all three installments remained relatively equal in other territories, with less than $2 million separating them.

Scream 4 underperformed domestically, grossing just less than its $40 million budget, making $38.2 million in the U.S. and Canada. It did better internationally, grossing $59 million in other territories for a total worldwide gross of $97.1 million. It remains the lowest financially performing entry in the series to date and, according to industry experts, the film's opening weekend was "disappointing", with the film representing the second-lowest opening of the Scream franchise. Scream (2022) grossed $81.6 million in the U.S. and Canada, and $57.2 million in other territories, for a worldwide total of $138.9 million.

Scream VI had grossed $168.8 million worldwide as of May 1, 2023. It became the highest grossing instalment of the franchise at the domestic US box office (in unadjusted figures) and was the first movie in the franchise to cross $100 million at the domestic US box office in 26 years, since Scream 2 in 1997. In 2026, Scream 7 became the highest grossing movie in the franchise, earning over $200 million at the global box office. The film surpassed its $45 million budget, grossing $121,852,468 domestically and $213,835,967 worldwide.

=== Critical and public response ===
Critical response to Scream films
Film	Critical		Public
Film	Rotten Tomatoes	Metacritic	CinemaScore
Scream	78% (131 reviews)	66 (26 reviews)	B+
Scream 2	83% (133 reviews)	62 (22 reviews)	B+
Scream 3	45% (164 reviews)	56 (32 reviews)	B
Scream 4	61% (191 reviews)	52 (32 reviews)	B−
Scream	76% (300 reviews)	60 (49 reviews)	B+
Scream VI	77% (317 reviews)	61 (53 reviews)	B+
Scream 7	30% (213 reviews)	35 (42 reviews)	B−

Critical response to Scream series
Series	Season	Rotten Tomatoes	Metacritic
Scream	1	52% (42 reviews)	57 (20 reviews)
Scream	2	92% (12 reviews)	—N/a
Scream	3	40% (5 reviews)	—N/a

The Scream film series has received a largely positive critical response since the release of the first film in 1996 with Kevin Thomas of The Los Angeles Times calling Scream "a bravura, provocative sendup of horror pictures" while Empire's Adam Smith called it "Clever, quick and bloody funny." Other reviews appreciated the shift from the teen slasher films of the 1980s and their "endless series of laborious, half-baked sequels." Williamson's script received praise for its "fiendishly clever, complicated plot" which "deftly mixes irony, self-reference and wry social commentary with chills and blood spills." Janet Maslin of The New York Times was less complimentary saying "[Craven] wants things both ways, capitalizing on lurid material while undermining it with mocking humor. Not even horror fans who can answer all this film's knowing trivia questions may be fully comfortable with such an exploitative mix".

In 2008, Scream went on to rank No. 32 on Entertainment Weekly's list of the '50 Best High School Movies and No. 13 on Bravo's "The 100 Scariest Movie Movements". In 2008, Entertainment Weekly would add additional praise to the film, listing it as No. 60 on their list of the "100 Best Films of the Last 13 years". The film ranked No. 482 on Empire's 2008 list of "The 500 Greatest Movies of All Time". Scream received several awards in 1996 including the Saturn Award's Best Actress for Campbell, Best Writing for Williamson and Best Horror Film plus nominations for Best Director for Wes Craven and Best Supporting Actor for both Ulrich and Barrymore. The film was also awarded the 1997 Best Movie by the MTV Movie Awards.

Scream 2 received equally positive critical response with some critics arguing that the film surpassed the original in scares and humor. Both Gene Siskel and the New York Times' Janet Maslin gave the sequel positive reviews despite their negative response to Scream. The film failed to achieve the same success as the original in terms of awards however, winning only the 1998 MTV Movie Award for Best Female Performance for Campbell plus Saturn Award nominations for Best Actress, Best Supporting Actress and Best Horror Film for Campbell, Cox and Scream 2 respectively.

Scream 3 received mixed reviews, with many critics agreeing it was a step down compared to the first two entries and relied too heavily on horror movie clichés. Of the characters, Roger Ebert said "[they] are so thin, they're transparent" but praised Campbell's appearance, saying "The camera loves her. She could become a really big star and then giggle at clips from this film at her AFI tribute". Conversely, Kevin Thomas of the Los Angeles Times called it "genuinely scary and also highly amusing"; Tom Coates at the BBC similarly stated that "as the conclusion to the trilogy it works more effectively than anyone had a right to expect". The movie and its themes were re-evaluated and examined in the wake of the MeToo movement, with many seeing the commentary on sexism and abuse in Hollywood as ahead of its time.

Scream 4 received mixed reviews at the time of its release. While critics said it was an improvement over its predecessor, they were divided over the humor, kills, and its use of clichés. New York Daily News wrote that the film was "dated" and that its reliance "on obvious clichés doesn't seem ironic anymore, just easy". Empire gave the film two out of five stars, criticizing the film's old-fashioned formula and lack of scare factor. Positive reviews included Colin Covert of the Minneapolis Star Tribune, who gave the film a perfect score of four out of four stars, praising the combination of scares, comedy, and twists. Reappraising the film, many have credited Scream 4 as also being ahead of its time, foreshadowing the effects of social media and Internet fame, while also praising Craven's creative vision before his death four years following the film's release.

Scream (2022) received positive reviews from critics, who praised the new and old cast's performances. Aedan Juvet of Screen Rant called the entry an excellent modern slasher and wrote, "Though the franchise has always been a distinguished property with pure perfection, the recent return to Scream raises the bar for aspiring slashers, once again setting a standard for modern horror – just as it did 25 years ago." In a more mixed review, Wenlei Ma of News.com.au rated the film 3 out of 5 and felt that "Scream 5 lacks the spark Bettinelli-Olpin and Gillett brought to Ready or Not. Scream 5 is certainly funny and irreverent, but where it falls over is that it's rarely scary."

Scream VI received positive reviews from critics, who praised the use of New York City as a fresh setting for the franchise while also praising the increased violence and performances of the cast. Chicago Sun-Times's Richard Roeper gave the film three out of four stars, writing "Nevertheless, off we go on another aggressively gruesome, wickedly funny and at times cleverly staged Scream-fest that cheerfully defies logic while hitting all the right notes we've come to expect from the franchise." He praised the performances of Barrera, Ortega and Brown and felt the film's ending was "the most outlandish and spectacularly brutal ending of all".

In a more mixed review, Olly Richards, reviewing the film for Empire, gave it three out of five stars, opining that it was "still far more inventive and entertaining than most horror franchises of a similar vintage", yet "one of the sillier series entries in terms of plot, but still scary enough and funny enough to leave you hoping Ghostface might yet kill again". Scream VI won the MTV Movie and TV Award for Best Movie and Best Fight (Courteney Cox vs Ghostface).

Despite its success at the box office, Scream 7 received mostly negative reviews from critics, with writer Kevin Maher calling the film a "bland and rote bum" in The Times, while Frank Scheck of The Hollywood Reporter said, "The overfamiliarity would be more palatable if the dialogue were as fresh and funny as it was in the early installments, or if the kills were more creatively staged. But there's a rote quality to the proceedings that makes Scream 7 feel like a slog despite its high body count and copious gore." In a slightly more neutral review, William Bibbiani at The Wrap called the film "competent" but "uninspired". Scream 7 received 1.5 stars out of 4 on RogerEbert.com, and a review from Soundsphere Magazine said the franchise was "long past its prime".

== Awards and nominations ==
The series has won many awards including:

- Best Horror Film at the Saturn Awards for Scream (1996)
- MTV Movie Award for Best Movie for Scream (1996)
- Saturn Award for Best Actress for Neve Campbell for Scream (1996)
- Blockbuster Entertainment Award for Favorite Actor – Horror for David Arquette for Scream 2 (1997)
- Blockbuster Entertainment Award for Favorite Actress – Horror for Neve Campbell for Scream 2 (1997)
- MTV Movie Award for Best Actor in a Movie and MTV Movie Award for Best Female Performance for Neve Campbell for Scream 2 (1997)
- Blockbuster Entertainment Award for Favorite Actor – Horror for David Arquette for Scream 3 (2000)
- Blockbuster Entertainment Award for Favorite Actress – Horror for Neve Campbell for Scream 3 (2000)
- Teen Choice Award for Choice Movie – Chemistry (Courteney Cox and David Arquette)
- Jenna Ortega won Most Frightened Performance at the MTV Movie & TV Awards for Scream (2022), which was also nominated for Best Movie
- Scream VI (2023) won Best Movie (the second time a movie in the franchise has won Best Movie at the MTV Awards) and Best Fight (Courteney Cox vs Ghostface).
- Jenna Ortega won The Drama Movie Star of the Year award at the 2024 People's Choice Awards for Scream VI (2023)
- Melissa Barrera won IMDb's Fan Favorite Star Meter for Scream VI (2023)

== Home media ==
Scream (1996) was released on VHS on December 2, 1997, and on DVD on December 3, 1997, in US territories by Buena Vista Home Entertainment. A collector's edition of the film released on December 8, 1998, containing the film as well as deleted scenes, outtakes, the film's theatrical trailer, cast interviews, directors commentary, and behind-the-scenes information. On October 19, 2021, for the film's 25th anniversary, Paramount released a newly remastered 4K version of the film on Ultra HD Blu-ray.

Scream 2 was released on VHS on December 1, 1998, and on DVD on July 22, 1998, in US territories by Buena Vista Home Entertainment. A collector's edition followed on August 7, 2001. The collector's edition features additional material including outtakes, deleted scenes, the film's theatrical trailer, music videos of songs featured in the film, and directors' commentary. On October 4, 2022, for the film's 25th anniversary, Paramount released a newly remastered 4K version of the film on Ultra HD Blu-ray.

Scream 3 was released on VHS on October 24, 2000, and on DVD on July 4, 2000, in US territories by Walt Disney Studios Home Entertainment, which had rebranded from Buena Vista by 2000. The DVD release was as a collector's edition which features deleted scenes, outtakes, audio commentary, music videos of songs featured in the film, trailers for the film and biographies on the cast and crew involved in the film's production. In 2001, the Scream 3 release was nominated for a Saturn Award for Best Home Video Release.

Scream 4 was first released on DVD and Blu-ray in Mexico on August 5, 2011. It was later released in the United Kingdom and Ireland on August 22, 2011, in Canada and the U.S. on October 4, 2011, and in Australia and New Zealand on October 13, 2011. To celebrate the film's 15th anniversary, Scream 4 was re-released through Lionsgate Limited with a 4K Steelbook and a "Be Kind, Rewind" VHS edition on June 9, 2026.

Scream (2022) was released digitally on March 1, 2022, in the United States It was released on Ultra HD Blu-ray, Blu-ray, and DVD on April 5, 2022, by Paramount Home Entertainment.

Scream VI became available for digital purchase and on streaming service Paramount+ on April 25, 2023. That July 11, the film was released on Blu-ray Disc, DVD, and 4K Ultra HD Blu-ray, as well as in a 4K Ultra HD Steelbook edition.

Scream 7 was released on digital on March 31, 2026, and included over 40 minutes of bonus content. The film received a physical release through Paramount that June 16 with four separate versions: DVD, 4K Ultra HD, a 4K Ultra HD limited-edition SteelBook, and an Amazon-exclusive 4K Ultra HD with a collectible Ghostface toy.

In foreign territories, Scream, Scream 2 and Scream 3 remained unreleased, including in Europe and Japan, until 2001, when they were simultaneously released that February 26 by Buena Vista Home Entertainment. Each film contained the additional content found in the collector's edition versions of their US releases, including deleted scenes, outtakes, theatrical trailers, music videos and commentary from each respective film's crew.

Following the release of Scream 3, the first three films were collected in The Ultimate Scream Collection by Dimension Films on September 26, 2000, in a box set containing Scream, Scream 2 and Scream 3, plus Behind the Scream, a short documentary about the production of the three films, and additional material, including screen tests of actors involved in the films, outtakes, and deleted scenes. Additionally, the three films were collected together in a single pack, again released on February 26, 2001, and released as Scream Trilogy. The three original films were released individually and in a collection in Blu-ray Disc format on March 29, 2011, two weeks prior to the release of Scream 4, by Lionsgate Home Entertainment, which included 1080p high definition versions of the films. In addition to the films, each release contained audio commentary, theatrical trailers and behind-the-scenes footage for each respective film. On April 25, 2023, Scream (2022) and Scream VI became available in a two-film digital collection. A DVD box set collection of the first six films of the Scream franchise became available at Amazon, Walmart, and Best Buy in 2023.

== Soundtrack ==
=== Scream (1996) ===
The Scream (1996) original soundtrack, released December 17, 1996, by the label TVT Records, features 12 songs by various artists including the original piece "Trouble in Woodsboro"/"Sidney's Lament" from the film's score by Marco Beltrami, most of which appeared in various scenes in the film. The piece "School's Out" by Alice Cooper appeared in the film but was replaced with a cover version of the song by The Last Hard Men on the album. The album was given 3 out of 5 stars by Allmusic though it was considered a failure and never charted on the Billboard 200 despite the success of the film.

The Scream score by Marco Beltrami would be his first time scoring a major film release and the ensuing exposure allowed him to go on to score other blockbuster films such as I, Robot and Live Free or Die Hard. The score would not be released commercially until July 14, 1998, by Varèse Sarabande in a dual-pack with the Scream 2 score. However it was found to lack several pieces from the films, with a runtime of only 12 minutes compared to the more common 30–45 minutes normally found in original scores due to the high reuse fees involved in obtaining the rights to commercially release the music. Beltrami was considered to have taken inspiration from the synthetic styles of Éric Serra and other successful scores, the references becoming more pronounced in his score to Scream 2. The theme for the central character Sidney Prescott, "Sidney's Lament" incorporated a "haunting" female solo vocal that would be utilized in other tracks throughout the entire film series. The score to Scream received generally positive reviews with Mikael Carlsson labeling it as some of the most intriguing horror scores composed in years while Filmtracks claimed the scores had "cult status".

=== Scream 2 ===
The Scream 2 original soundtrack was released December 2, 1997, by Capitol Records featuring 15 songs in the R&B, rap and rock genres by various artists, some of which are represented in the film. The album spent ten weeks on the Billboard 200, rising as high as No. 50 but received a lower score than its predecessor from the music guide Allmusic, gaining only 2 out of 5. Stephen Erlewine of Allmusic opined that the soundtrack was an attempt to compensate for the previous film's lack of a hit soundtrack, but failed to do, creating an "uneven" album of songs not "good enough to make [the artists'] own albums".

The Scream 2 score was, as in Scream, developed by Marco Beltrami and was released on July 14, 1998, in a dual-pack with the score to Scream by Varèse Sarabande. The commercially released score was found to be lacking several pieces used in the film, with a runtime of only 17 minutes compared to the more common 30–45 minutes normally found in original scores. Included in the missing pieces was the track "Cassandra Aria" created by Danny Elfman, described by soundtrack-review site Filmtracks as "a frenzied, choral-enhanced three minutes" that remains unreleased as of March 2011. The length of the released score was considered disappointing and blamed on the fees required to be paid to musicians in order to release their music. The influence of several other famous composers could be heard in the score including Hans Zimmer, Elliot Goldenthal, Ennio Morricone and Christopher Young. In particular excerpts of the Hans Zimmer's score to Broken Arrow, featuring guitar by Duane Eddy, would become a component of the theme tune of the character Dewey Riley.

=== Scream 3 ===
The Scream 3 original soundtrack was released on January 25, 2000, by Wind-up Records featuring 18 songs consisting largely of the metal genre by artists such as System of a Down, Slipknot and Powerman 5000, some of which are represented in the film. The album fared better than its predecessors, spending fourteen weeks on the Billboard 200 and reaching a top rank of #32. and scoring a 2.5 out of 5 from music guide Allmusic. Reviewer Steve Huey claims that the "high pedigree" of the albums contributors had produced a "pretty listenable album".

The Scream 3 score was again helmed by Marco Beltrami who employed seven orchestrators and experimented with the recording of instruments in unusual circumstances such as physically and electronically altering the traditional sound of a piano while continuing to include a heavy vocal orchestra in his tracks There was consideration that Beltrami was forced to hire multiple orchestrators to complete the score to meet the film's deadline. Like previous scores in the series, the Scream 3 score was released by Varèse Sarabande on February 29, 2000, with a total length of 33 minutes of music, though the album was again found to be missing certain sections of the score utilized within the film. Beltrami took inspiration from other composers for the score, again incorporating excerpts of the score to Broken Arrow by Hans Zimmer in the track "Sid Wears a Dress". Music guide Allmusic awarded the Scream 3 score 2.5 out of 5.

=== Scream 4 ===
The Scream 4: Original Motion Picture Soundtrack was released on April 12, 2011, by Lakeshore Records. The soundtrack features 12 songs performed by various artists mainly of the rock genre, such as Ida Maria, The Sounds and The Novocaines. The soundtrack received mixed reactions, with Gotham News stating that "This new album attempts to retain the style of the old, while speaking to the present content-diluted market. It has some success, but no cigar." Shadowlocked criticized the soundtrack's overly light tone, saying that "There's little here that I would have picked for a horror movie."

A score soundtrack was also released, on April 19, 2011, by Varèse Sarabande. The Scream 4 score was yet again developed by Marco Beltrami. It received mixed reviews. Filmtracks stating that "Despite the memorable history Beltrami has afforded the franchise musically, Scream 4 is a substantially disappointing continuation of the narrative. He and four assistant composers handle the 2011 entry from a purely functional stance, tackling individual scenes with stylistic remnants of the previous scores while accomplishing absolutely nothing new." Soundtrack-review site Sountrackgeek gave the score a highly favorable review: "It is possibly the best score in the Scream series, because it is so incredibly forceful. It wants to be full of action and chills and it is. It's not the scariest of scores, but Scream has never been about the moody scares, but rather the surprise scare and crazy fight/chase scenes. It succeeds and I had a blast listening to this from start to finish."

=== Scream (2022) ===
The Scream (2022) soundtrack consists of 15 songs – primarily of the pop, alternative, and hip-hop genres – featuring artists such as Kim Petras, DJ Khaled, and Santigold. The soundtrack received positive reviews, with Joséphine Michele of Screen Rant describing it as matching the tone of the Scream films perfectly while still feeling modern, saying "the movie itself takes heavy inspiration from the first film, but Scream (2022) ups the gore and violence, and the soundtrack brings it into the 2020s."

The fifth film's score soundtrack was released on January 7, 2022, by Varèse Sarabande. The score was developed by Brian Tyler, making it the first film in the franchise with a score that was not created by Marco Beltrami.

=== Scream VI ===
The film was co-scored by Brian Tyler, returning from the previous installment, and Sven Faulconer. Demi Lovato and Mike Shinoda contributed to the soundtrack with their songs "Still Alive" and "In My Head", respectively.

=== Scream 7 ===
The film was scored by Marco Beltrami, marking his first return to the franchise since Scream 4. The film's score album was released on May 22, 2026, by Lakeshore Records.

== Documentary films ==
In 2011, to celebrate the 15th anniversary of the franchise and the release of Scream 4, two documentaries were released in April. On April 6, the documentary film Scream: The Inside Story directed by Daniel Farrands, was aired on the Bio channel. On April 14, the documentary film Still Screaming: The Ultimate Scary Movie Retrospective directed by Ryan Turek, premiered in limited theatrical release. Composer John Corlis wrote the music for the documentary, which was released digitally in 2018.

The documentaries discuss the first three movies in the series and include interviews with Wes Craven, Neve Campbell, David Arquette and other cast members. Both documentaries were released as part of the Scream: 5-Film Set Blu‑Ray edition in September 2011.

== Video games ==
In 2011, a Scream 4 video game (stylized as SCRE4M), developed by Beefy Media and Codeglue, published by The Weinstein Company, was released for iOS and Android. A multiplayer PC game in which players could take on the roles of both killers and victims was in development in 2011 by Fatshark, but it was cancelled. The working builds of the game were discovered in the leak of 12 terabytes of Steam files in August 2026.

Ghostface has appeared as a playable character in the games Call of Duty: Warzone, Call of Duty: Black Ops Cold War, Dead by Daylight, Among Us, Mortal Kombat 1, Mortal Kombat Mobile and Fortnite. Ghostface also appeared briefly in the game Hooked on You: A Dead by Daylight Dating Sim.

== Controversies ==
Amidst the series' success, it has also been tinged with controversy with claims of real-world copycat crime inspirations and inducing violence.

On May 4, 1999, following the Columbine High School massacre and increasing news media scrutiny on the effects on society of violence in films, games and other media, the United States Senate Commerce committee held a hearing about Hollywood's marketing of films to youths and the horror genre of films in particular, using the opening scene of Scream, as an example of negative media which may be viewed by children.

In the 2006 murder of Cassie Jo Stoddart, the perpetrators, Brian Draper and Torey Adamcik, both 16, were said to be inspired by the Scream franchise.

In January 2022, following the release of the fifth film, Logan Smith, 18, of Cocoa, Florida, tried to strangle a jogger to death after watching Scream, with intent to keep the corpse.
