= List of Scream (TV series) characters =

The following is a list of characters from the slasher television series Scream, which is based on the film series of the same name.

== Overview ==
=== Main ===
Actor	Character	Scream		
Actor	Character	1	2	3
Willa Fitzgerald Karsyn Darby^{Y} Madison Wolfe^{Y}	Emma Duval	Main	Main	
Bex Taylor-Klaus	Audrey Jensen	Main	Main	
John Karna	Noah Foster	Main	Main	
Amadeus Serafini	Kieran Wilcox	Main	Main	
Connor Weil	Will Belmont	Main		
Carlson Young	Brooke Maddox	Main	Main	
Jason Wiles	Clark Hudson	Main		
Tracy Middendorf Karsyn Darby^{Y} Anna Grace Barlow^{Y} Caitlin Ashley-Thompson^{Y}	Maggie Duval	Main	Main	
Kiana Brown	Zoe Vaughn		Main	
Santiago Segura	Stavo Acosta		Main	
RJ Cyler Jaden Robinson^{Y}	Deion and Marcus Elliot			Main
Jessica Sula	Liv Reynolds			Main
Giorgia Whigham	Beth			Main
Tyga	Jay Elliot			Main
Keke Palmer	Kym			Main
C.J. Wallace	Amir Ayoub			Main
Tyler Posey	Shane			Main

=== Recurring ===
Actor	Character	Scream		
Actor	Character	1	2	3
Bobby Campo	Seth Branson	Recurring	Recurring	
Tom Maden	Jake Fitzgerald	Recurring	Recurring	
Bryan Batt	Quinn Maddox	Recurring	Recurring	
Amelia Rose Blaire	Piper Shaw	Recurring	Guest	
Sosie Bacon	Rachel Murray	Recurring	Guest	
Bella Thorne	Nina Patterson	Recurring		
Brianne Tju	Riley Marra	Recurring		
Tom Everett Scott	Kevin Duval	Guest	Recurring	
Anthony Ruivivar	Miguel Acosta		Recurring	
Sean Grandillo	Eli Hudson		Recurring	
Austin Highsmith	Kristen Lang		Recurring	
Mary Katherine Duhon	Haley Meyers		Recurring	
Karina Logue	Tina Hudson		Recurring	
Gideon Emery	T. Reynolds			Recurring
Tony Todd	Luther "Hook Man" Thompson			Recurring
Giullian Yao Gioiello	Manny			Recurring
Mary J. Blige	Sherry Elliot			Recurring

== Main characters ==
=== Scream (2015–2016) ===
==== Emma Duval ====
- Portrayed by Willa Fitzgerald, Karsyn Darby (young; seasons 1–2) and Madison Wolfe (young; season 1)
- Appeared in: seasons 1–2

Emma Duval is the main protagonist and is a student at George Washington High School. She is the daughter of Maggie (Daisy) and Kevin Duval. Originally, a popular girl with no inhibitions, she is soon stalked by a killer, who threatens her and her friends. In the first-season finale, the killer is revealed to be Emma's half-sister Piper Shaw, who began to terrorize Emma because of her perfect life. Emma manages to put an end to the rampage by shooting Piper in the head, killing her. In the second season, Emma returns after leaving Lakewood to get psychological help and develops PTSD as a result of the first season's events. She has frequent hallucinations before again being targeted by a new killer.

Willa Fitzgerald's character was originally named Harper but was changed when the official pilot script was written. Fitzgerald was nominated at the Teen Choice Awards for Choice TV Actress: Summer but lost to Ashley Benson.

==== Audrey Jensen ====
- Portrayed by Bex Taylor-Klaus
- Appeared in: seasons 1–2

The daughter of a Lutheran pastor, Audrey is one of Emma's best friends and has a close friendship with her. She loves horror movies, and is known to be witty and bi-curious. Throughout the first season, Audrey was suspected of being involved in the killings. In the first-season finale, it is revealed that Audrey and Piper exchanged letters months prior to the murders, which indicate that she was connected to the killings. She, however, burns them, covering up her involvement. In the second season, she is stalked by the new killer who blackmails her over her involvement with Piper. It is soon revealed that Audrey is the reason Piper first came to Lakewood, but she was not involved in the killings.

Taylor-Klaus received critical acclaim as Audrey Jensen. Rotten Tomatoes named them as one of the most developed characters on the show.

==== Noah Foster ====
- Portrayed by John Karna
- Appeared in: seasons 1–2

Noah is Audrey's best friend and the duo are known as "Bi-Curious & The Virgin". He is shown to be an expert on horror film tropes, and frequently applies them to his life after the killings begin. Noah helps Emma figure out some of the clues in the first season. In the second season, Noah has a daily podcast called "The Morgue", which he took over after Piper Shaw was unmasked as the Lakewood Slasher in the first season. He later begins a relationship with Zoe Vaughn. Later, he is kidnapped and buried alive alongside Zoe. While Emma and Audrey manage to save him, Zoe dies before they can reach her. Noah is devastated, and briefly considers shutting down "The Morgue" before deciding to continue in Zoe's memory. In the second-season Halloween special, he partners with Stavo to create a horror graphic novel, and goes to an island to reach the mystery of the murderess Anna Hobbs, where they (and the rest of the second season survivors) are stalked again by another killer.

Karna received critical acclaim for his role and was especially noted for his horror dynamic.

==== Kieran Wilcox ====
- Portrayed by Amadeus Serafini
- Appeared in: seasons 1–2

Kieran is a new kid in Lakewood, after losing his mother and his stepfather in a car accident before the series, and grows a special bond with Emma in the first season. He was suspected of being the killer but no evidence was found against him. In the first-season finale, Kieran's father, Clark Hudson, is killed through disembowelment. Kieran's cousin Eli and aunt Tina arrive after he is found living without an adult. In the second season, Kieran is eventually revealed to be Piper's accomplice in the killings. His motive is explained as he and Piper were in a relationship and started a murder spree as revenge against their parents (Piper for being put up for adoption while her half-sister Emma had the life Piper should have had, and Kieran for his dad dumping him in Atlanta with his mom to get high on pills). He continued to frame both Emma and Audrey for the murders to avenge Piper. He is ultimately arrested and sentenced to life in prison; however, he is murdered by the new killer in the second-season Halloween special episodes.

==== Brooke Maddox ====
- Portrayed by Carlson Young
- Appeared in: seasons 1–2

Brooke is the sassy and blunt-spoken queen bee of George Washington High, and is best friends with Emma. She is the daughter of the town's mayor Quinn Maddox, with whom she has a strained relationship (intensified after learning he had been illegally dealing with Jake, and had also covered up the death of a drug addict friend of Brooke's mother). Initially appearing shallow, Brooke is gradually shown to be more kinder and softer than her previous image suggested after her friend Riley becomes a victim to the killer. Brooke is repeatedly attacked throughout the first season in a variety of settings – a theatre stage, a bowling alley, and a freezer in her garage – but manages to survive each encounter. In the first-season finale, Jake becomes her new boyfriend. After his death in the second-season premiere, she develops a relationship with Gustavo Acosta. In the second-season finale, she is attacked by the new killer (Kieran Wilcox) in a movie theatre, being stabbed twice, but survives once again. Following the death of her father and three months after the second-season finale, she moves in with Gustavo and his father, Miguel.

==== Will Belmont ====
- Portrayed by Connor Weil
- Appeared in: season 1

Emma's former boyfriend, a jock who is friends with Jake Fitzgerald. He cheated on Emma with Nina Patterson, an affair that lasted less than a month, resulting in their breakup. In "Betrayed", he is assaulted and dragged away by the killer. In "In the Trenches", Emma, Noah, Brooke, and Jake find an injured Will at an abandoned bowling alley, and are later rescued. Soon after, he is killed when farm equipment was rigged to slice his head open. His death causes Emma, who witnessed the murder, to suffer from hallucinations of Will, with his head split open, stalking her.

==== Clark Hudson ====
- Portrayed by Jason Wiles
- Appeared in: season 1

The sheriff of Lakewood in the first season, as well as Kieran Wilcox's biological father. Before the series begin, Kieran moves in with him after his mother (Clark's ex-wife) dies in a car crash with her new husband. He later starts dating Maggie. In "The Dance", he is kidnapped by the killer whilst chasing a lead. In the first-season finale, he is found dead by Maggie and the police, tied to a tree. However, it turns out that he was disemboweled and quickly died from his injuries.

==== Maggie Duval ====
Portrayed by Tracy Middendorf, Karsyn Darby (young; season 1), Anna Grace Barlow (young; season 1) and Caitlin Ashley-Thompson (young; season 2)

- Appeared in: seasons 1–2

Maggie is Emma's mother, who is the town coroner. Despite her closeness to her daughter, Maggie hides many secrets from her. Her past is initially mysterious, but is gradually unraveled as the first season progresses. It turns out that Maggie was nicknamed "Daisy" and was the girl that Brandon James was supposedly obsessed with, and started his killing spree because of. However, Maggie is revealed to be a childhood friend and next door neighbor of Brandon's. After discovering her then-boyfriend Kevin Duval was cheating on her, she slept with Brandon. Afterwards, Brandon began his killing spree, murdering five students and wounding and traumatizing Kevin. It is discovered near the end of the season that Maggie became pregnant because of her fling with Brandon, and she and her family left town to have the baby, who was given up for adoption at birth. Maggie is later kidnapped by the killer and taken to a dock where Brandon's killing spree ended. The killer lures Emma there, and unveils themselves as Piper Shaw, who reveals herself to be Maggie and Brandon's daughter. When Piper attacks Emma, Maggie frees herself and assaults Piper, only to be stabbed in the stomach. Piper is then shot and killed by Audrey, who arrives at the scene, and Emma. Maggie survives the attack, as does Emma. In the second season, she becomes involved in the investigation on the new murders. It is later revealed that she and Miguel Acosta discovered Brandon alive after his supposed death at the dock, and hid him. Later, she discovers notes placed on the tree in her backyard, and sends one back. In the second-season finale, Maggie receives another one with blood on it.

==== Zoe Vaughn ====
- Portrayed by Kiana Brown
- Appeared in: season 2

First mentioned in the first season, Zoe first appears in the second-season premiere. She is an intelligent student, who becomes Noah's love interest. She turns out to be a fan of Noah's podcast "The Morgue" and is somewhat knowledgeable on horror movie tropes. However, she harbours a dark secret. She grew up with Emma, but left shortly before the murders in the first season. In "Let The Right One In" Zoe told Noah her absence was because her mom bought her a therapist although she does not state why. However, it is implied that she attempted suicide as a result of feelings of loneliness and a lack of friends. She later participated in the town's teen beauty pageant, which she wins, and she later consummates her relationship with Noah. Soon after, she is kidnapped and trapped in a wooden box, which is dragged to the edge of Wren Lake. She dies from drowning before Audrey, Emma, and Noah could reach her. Devastated yet determined to savor their time together, Noah continues "The Morgue" in Zoe's memory.

==== Stavo Acosta ====
- Portrayed by Santiago Segura
- Appeared in: season 2

Gustavo "Stavo" Acosta is introduced at the start of the second season, as the son of the town's new sheriff Miguel Acosta. The new student at George Washington High School, Stavo initially appears as a creepy and withdrawn student. He is shown to have a love horror comic books and obsession with serial killers. He is shown to like drawing Emma and her friends covered in blood, which is revealed to be a part of a horror graphic novel he is creating. However, during a school lockdown after Jake's body is found during an assembly, Audrey quickly accuses him of being involved with the murders and reveals to the other students his drawings on his iPad. Stavo is then assaulted by other students, and has iPad broken in the process. He then denounces Audrey for her suspicions. Soon, however, even Stavo's father starts to suspect his involvement after finding his drawings. Despite this, Stavo and Brooke begin a romance, despite the latter's initial resistance. Later in the season, it is revealed that Stavo's friend was accidentally shot and killed in front of him, which seemed to have traumatized him. In the second-season Halloween special episodes, Stavo is shown to have a burgeoning career in horror graphic comics, and starts a partnership with Noah as a result.

==== Lakewood Slasher / Shallow Grove Slasher ====
- Voiced by Mike Vaughn
- Appeared in: Seasons 1–2 (as Lakewood Slasher) and Halloween Special (as Shallow Grove Slasher)

=== Scream: Resurrection (2019) ===
==== Deion and Marcus Elliot ====
- Portrayed by RJ Cyler and Jaden Robinson (young)
- Appeared in: Resurrection

==== Liv Reynolds ====
- Portrayed by Jessica Sula
- Appeared in: Resurrection

==== Beth ====
- Portrayed by Giorgia Whigham
- Appeared in: Resurrection

==== Jay Elliot ====
- Portrayed by Tyga
- Appeared in: Resurrection

==== Kym ====
- Portrayed by Keke Palmer
- Appeared in: Resurrection

==== Amir Ayoub ====
- Portrayed by C. J. Wallace
- Appeared in: Resurrection

==== Ghostface ====
- Voiced by Roger L. Jackson
- Appeared in: Resurrection

== Recurring characters ==
=== Scream (2015–2016) ===
==== Piper Shaw ====
- Portrayed by Amelia Rose Blaire
- Appeared in: seasons 1–2

Piper was a podcaster who owned the infamous true crime podcast "Autopsy of a Crime". She comes to Lakewood to investigate the murder spree and forms a bond with Emma Duval. In the first-season finale, she is revealed to be the Lakewood Slasher and actually Emma's half sister. During a showdown on the dock, Piper is killed. In the second season, it is revealed that Piper has an accomplice who continues her work. In the second season, Piper appears in flashbacks. Her corpse has been found by her accomplice for being discovered by Emma and Audrey in The Orphanage. They understand that the New Killer has targeted them to avenge Piper. Piper is the main antagonist of the first season. Piper's name was originally named "Piper Shay".

==== Seth Branson ====
Portrayed by: Bobby Campo

- Appeared in: seasons 1–2

Seth Brandon was a teacher at GWH who had a secret (and illicit) relationship with Brooke Maddox. He is later suspected of the murders when incriminating evidence is discovered in his classroom, as well as the fact that he had changed his name and moved to Lakewood after one of his previous students was found dead. Seth is almost killed in the first-season finale, in which Piper assaulted him and planned to frame him for the murders. Later, when Brooke attempts to find Jake, Seth is tricked by her into chaining himself to a bed at a hotel room, under the guise of another affair. However, Brooke leaves him there after getting her information, only for the killer to find him and cut off his right hand, leaving him unconscious. He is later tortured and stabbed, and burned to death by the new killer, when the latter attempts to kill Emma and Eli in a fire.

==== Jake Fitzgerald ====
- Portrayed by Tom Maden
- Appeared in: seasons 1–2

Jake is a jock at George Washington High who always makes crass jokes and loves being foolish, to the consternation of many people. He later grows close to Brooke Maddox. He was impaled through the chest in the first season, but since the blade missed all major organs, he survives the attack. In the second-season premiere, he is kidnapped, hanged upside down in a barn, and killed with a scythe, his stomach splitting open. The killer then uses Jake's identity to mess around with Brooke, which is successful since no one but Audrey is informed of his death. This keeps going until Jake's corpse, along with his blood and intestines, are dropped on Brooke during a school pageant in "Happy Birthday To Me".

==== Quinn Maddox ====
- Portrayed by Bryan Batt
- Appeared in: seasons 1–2

Mayor of Lakewood and Brooke's father. He allowed his daughter to throw parties at his home. In the first season, he had an affair with another woman, resulting in his wife leaving him and checking into rehab in Arizona. Later, he is discovered to have buried his wife's drug-addict friend's body after the man had a fatal overdose; however, this is filmed and his daughter Brooke briefly suspects him of murdering her mother. In the second season, Mayor Maddox is revealed to be dealing with Tina and Jake in illegal activities. He is later led into a barn and killed after being stabbed by a pitchfork in the chest by the killer in "Heavenly Creatures".

==== Riley Marra ====
- Portrayed by Brianne Tju
- Appeared in: season 1

Riley was one of Emma's best friends and was sweet and loving. She was interested in Noah Foster. In "Wanna Play a Game?", when the killer threatened Brooke's life, Emma texted him to not hurt her. As an indirect result of this "decision", Riley is chased by the killer at the sheriff station, and cornered when she attempts to climb up the side of the station. However, the killer stabs her multiple times and quickly escapes. Riley then succumbs to her wounds on the rooftop of the sheriff station, whilst Noah (who called her) witnessed her death. Her body is later discovered by Emma.

==== Rachel Murray ====
- Portrayed by Sosie Bacon
- Appeared in: seasons 1–2

Rachel was the secret girlfriend of Audrey Jensen and the first victim of the second killer, as well as the third victim overall. She is a victim of the prank pulled by Nina Patterson, involving a video of her and Audrey kissing. The Killer lures Rachel onto the balcony and wraps a noose around her neck and throws her over the side, snapping her neck. Her death is then staged to look like a suicide, but later proven to be murder. In the second season, it is revealed by Audrey that Piper was with her the night of Rachel's murder, meaning that Rachel's killer is Kieran, Piper's accomplice.

==== Lorraine Brock ====
- Portrayed by Sophina Brown
- Appeared in: season 1

Detective Lorraine Brock is assigned to the 2015 Lakewood Murders case by Mayor Quinn Maddox. In her investigations, she is shown to be blunt and up-in-your-face during interrogations against Audrey. It is later revealed that she and Clark Hudson share a tumultuous past as ex-lovers and also former narcotic addicts. Possibly due to her unprofessional behavior, Brock is removed from the case.

==== Kevin Duval ====
- Portrayed by Tom Everett Scott
- Appeared in: seasons 1–2

Emma's estranged father and Maggie's ex-husband. He is first shown in a hallucination by his daughter Emma, who reveals that he had been out of her life for eight years. It is later revealed that in 1994, he was one of six students attacked by Brandon James, who also shared a romantic interest in Maggie, and was the only survivor of the attack. As a result, he suffered psychological trauma and became an alcoholic, contributing to his departure from his family (along with the revelation that Maggie had been involved with Brandon before the 1994 killings). After learning his daughter Emma survived another similar set of murders, Kevin returns to Lakewood and tries to reconnect with her. In the second-season Halloween special episodes, he is shown at the grave of Kieran Wilcox, implying some involvement in his death.

==== Nina Patterson ====
- Portrayed by Bella Thorne
- Appeared in: season 1

Nina was the second victim of the Lakewood Slasher and was killed in her home and then thrown into her pool. Although Nina was the Queen Bee before Brooke, Nina was considered a mean-spirited, promiscuous and manipulative troublemaker. She was an antagonist of the first season, being the driving conflict of the drama half of the plot.

Thorne's character re-enacted the famous Drew Barrymore opening scene.

==== Miguel Acosta ====
- Portrayed by Anthony Ruivivar
- Appeared in: season 2

An outspoken, competent and experienced cop, Sheriff Miguel Acosta returns to Lakewood, where he grew up. He is a devoted, if sometimes strict, family man who’s very protective of his son, Gustavo.

==== Kristen Lang ====
- Portrayed by Austin Highsmith
- Appeared in: season 2

Kristen Lang is the new psychology teacher at GWH. She teaches Emma and her friends about dreamscaping and dream analysis, which providing. Lang is a young, idealistic high school psychology teacher who becomes a confidant and mentor to her students. Despite this, she is revealed to be in a secret relationship with Seth Branson, and is shown to be illegally recording her students (specifically Emma and the other members of the Lakewood Six) for research on an unofficial book on the psychological states of the survivors of the Lakewood massacre the previous year. She was thrown down the stairs by the killer in "Let the Right One In". However, she survives the attack when a janitor interrupts the assault. Whilst in the hospital, Audrey and Emma discover that Kristen was a foster sister of Piper Shaw, though when this news is reported, Kristen replies that she only knew Piper for a couple of months before leaving and had little interaction with her beforehand.

==== Eli Hudson ====
- Portrayed by Sean Grandillo
- Appeared in: season 2

Eli is Kieran's cousin and is romantically interested in Emma. Appearing creepy and somewhat standoffish, Eli always spies on Emma and her friends. Throughout the second season, he is shown to be developing some kind of obsession with Emma and is discovered to have been in Lakewood during the first murder spree. It is then shown that Kieran had set Eli up to look as if he were the killer, before he shot him multiple times, revealing himself as the true killer and Piper's accomplice.

==== Tina Hudson ====
- Portrayed by Karina Logue
- Appeared in: season 2

Tina Hudson is the sister of the late Clark Hudson, the mother of Eli Hudson, and the aunt of Kieran Wilcox. Tina appears proper and polite, but has a grifter’s sense of self-reliance, as she only took in Kieran for money she was received watching over him, and is shown to be very irresponsible. She is also an alcoholic, and was involved in Quinn Maddox's plan to burn down a development. Tina later leaves town, while both Kieran and Eli stay. It is unknown how she took the news of Eli's death, as well as Kieran being the second Lakewood Slasher.

==== Haley Meyers ====
- Portrayed by Mary Katherine Duhon
- Appeared in: season 2

Haley is a mean girl from school who dislikes Emma and her friends. She is seen pranking Audrey Jensen with a killer scare, resulting in Audrey stabbing her male friend in self-defense. She is revealed to be working for the new killer in "The Orphanage" and orchestrates a party at the abandoned children's home. After a brief encounter with what appears to be her "boyfriend", she is stabbed to death and hung below the party banner.

==== Gina Mclane ====
- Portrayed by Zena Grey
- Appeared in: season 2

Gina Mclane is a character who appears in the second-season Halloween special episodes. She is Audrey's girlfriend who works as the manager at the Zenith Theatre. Much like Audrey, Gina is shown to be a fan of horror movies. She later follows the group to the island supposedly to surprise Audrey, only to get trapped on the island with the killer. Gina feels that her romance with Audrey cannot stand up to Audrey's close friendship with Emma, though later realizes that this is not the case.

==== Alex Whitten / Tom Martin ====
- Portrayed by Alexander Calvert
- Appeared in: season 2

Alex Whitten (actually Tom Martin) is a character who appears in the second-season Halloween special episodes. He originally appears to be Reginald Whitten's great-grandson, and is supposedly the only survivor of the Whitten family. He is later revealed to be Tom Martin, and had killed the real Alex Whitten (Justin Burkhamer) beforehand and took his identity. After hearing about Emma and all the murder sprees she had survived, Tom became obsessed with her, believing they could have a relationship. He posted about the Anna Hobbs legend on Jeremy's website, luring the group to the island. It is later revealed that Tom witnessed his family's deaths, and is implied to have been traumatized, being a four-year-old boy who stayed with the bodies for several days before being discovered. He later attempts to kill Emma when she rejects his advances, though is thrown off the balcony of the Whitten family mansion, resulting in his death.

==== Jeremy Blair ====
- Portrayed by Alex Esola
- Appeared in: season 2

Jeremy Blair is a character who appears in the second-season Halloween special episodes. Jeremy is the editor for Noah and Gustavo's comic book based on the second season's murder spree. He is the one who persuades the two to take the trip to Shallow Grove Island to find information on Anna Hobbs for another book. He is very pushy about getting this new book due to investing all his savings into the project, which quickly gets him on the bad side of the Lakewood gang, and is shown to be rude. He is later stabbed to death by the murderer.

=== Scream: Resurrection (2019) ===
==== Luther "Hook Man" Thompson ====
- Portrayed by Tony Todd
- Appeared in: Resurrection

==== Manny ====
- Portrayed by Giullian Yao Gioiello
- Appeared in: Resurrection

==== Sherry Elliot ====
- Portrayed by Mary J. Blige
- Appeared in: Resurrection

==== Earl Elliot ====
- Portrayed by Diesel Madkins
- Appeared in: Resurrection

==== T. Reynolds ====
- Portrayed by Gideon Emery
- Appeared in: Resurrection

==== Avery Collins ====
- Portrayed by Patrick Johnson
- Appeared in: Resurrection

==== Hawkins ====
- Portrayed by Drew Starkey
- Appeared in: Resurrection

==== Coach Griffin ====
- Portrayed by Terrence J
- Appeared in: Resurrection
