= List of Scream characters =

Lists of Scream characters include:

- List of Scream (film series) characters
- List of Scream (TV series) characters
