= John Karna =

American actor

- Born: John Timothy Karna; November 18, 1992 (age 33); Houston, Texas, U.S.
- Occupation: Actor
- Years active: 2012–present

John Timothy Karna (born November 18, 1992) is an American actor. He is known for his role as Noah Foster in the first two seasons of the MTV slasher television series Scream, based on the film series of the same name. He is also known for appearing in the films Bindlestiffs (2012) and Premature (2014).

== Filmography ==
=== Film ===
Year	Title	Role	Notes
2012	Bindlestiffs	John Woo	
2014	Premature	Rob Crabbe	
2016	Sugar Mountain	Josh Miller	
2017	Lady Bird	Greg Anrue	
2021	The Blazing World	Blake	
2023	Home Free	Richard	
2024	The Dead Thing		

=== Television ===
Year	Title	Role	Notes
2014	The Neighbors	Hank	Episode: "You've Lost That Larry Feeling"
2014	Law & Order: Special Victims Unit	Holden March	Episode: "Holden's Manifesto"
2014	Modern Family	Alec	Episode: "Strangers in the Night"
2014	American Storage	Charlie	Episode: "Pilot"
2015–2016	Scream	Noah Foster	Main role (seasons 1–2)
2016	Chicago Fire	Alan	Episode: "I Held Her Hand"
2018	Dirty John	Jimmy	Episode: "Approachable Dreams"
2019	Valley of the Boom	Marc Andreessen	Main role
2019	Masters of Doom	Tom Hall	TV film
2021	9-1-1: Lone Star	Spence	Episode: "2100°"

=== Web ===
Year	Title	Role	Notes
2016	Scream: If I Die	Noah Foster	Episode: "Welcome to the Morgue"
