= Scream (2022 soundtrack) =

Scream (Music from the Motion Picture)

Soundtrack album by Brian Tyler
- Released: January 7, 2022
- Recorded: 2021
- Genre: Film score
- Length: 70:19
- Label: Varèse Sarabande

Brian Tyler chronology
Escape Room: Tournament of Champions (2021)	Scream (2022)	Redeeming Love (2022)

Scream (Music from the Motion Picture) is the soundtrack to the 2022 film Scream, the fifth instalment in the Scream franchise directed by Matt Bettinelli-Olpin and Tyler Gillett. The original score is composed by Brian Tyler, thereby replacing veteran franchise composer Marco Beltrami who contributed music for the first four instalments. The original score was released by Varèse Sarabande on January 7, 2022 and features 24 tracks running for over an hour. Unlike the previous instalments, a soundtrack for the songs featured in the film had not been released.

== Development ==
In May 2021, Brian Tyler, who previously collaborated with Bettinelli-Olpin and Gillett on Ready or Not (2019) has been recruited to contribute music for Scream. He liked the previous instalments in the film as well as Beltrami's scores, commenting it as an "incredible franchise with a storied history". So he wanted to acknowledge the history of the previous scores, while taking the musical landscape into a new world. The score features new themes as well as older themes intertwined in a way doing justice to the franchise. Tyler added that there is an emotional component to the new film, integrally contrasts to the terror that accompanied and wanted this to reflect it in the score to make it as "a fully realized experience".

Bettinelli-Olpin and Gillett admitted that the franchise had a certain musical language, hence he instructed Tyler to include the original themes from the predecessors to set the sonic landscape for Scream. Some of the tracks such as Nick Cave and the Bad Seeds' "Red Right Hand" and other tracks such as "Sidney's Lament" and "Dewey's Theme" from the score had been referenced throughout the film, as well as new tracks for the film being licensed. Since the music has been crucial to the narrative, the duo had spent a lot of time on integrating the songs and needle drops to the film. Unlike the predecessors, the songs featured in the film, had been not released in a separate album, consisting of fifteen tracks.

== Release ==
Scream (Music from the Motion Picture) was released on January 7, 2022 by Varèse Sarabande in digital streaming as well as physical CD and vinyl LP formats. It was preceded with the score cue "Into A New World" released for exclusive streaming through Deadline Hollywood. Varèse Sarabande preceded the soundtrack release, by unveiling the limited edition box sets of the film scores from the first four Scream films, provided by Beltrami. Another vinyl edition of the score—pressed in clear red smoke vinyl (the original release had a black colored vinyl)—was released on June 10, 2022.

== Track listing ==
No.	Title	Length
1.	"New Horizons"	3:50
2.	"Rules to Survive"	3:13
3.	"Ring Ring"	2:41
4.	"Would You Like to Play a Game"	6:20
5.	"Apparitions"	4:11
6.	"Amends"	3:05
7.	"History Repeats"	2:28
8.	"Suspects, Rules, and Requels"	4:53
9.	"Cold Refreshments"	1:55
10.	"In Hot Water"	4:17
11.	"Pain in the Neck"	2:20
12.	"Diversions"	2:01
13.	"Lights Out"	3:12
14.	"Hospital Visitor"	4:59
15.	"Sacrifice"	5:01
16.	"Not My Story"	2:10
17.	"I Started All This"	1:56
18.	"Chromeface"	2:23
19.	"The Expert"	1:17
20.	"Welcome to Act Three"	3:08
21.	"Where It All Began"	2:21
22.	"True Fans"	4:11
23.	"Passing the Torch"	3:58
24.	"Ghostface"	3:41

== Reception ==
In a negative review, Filmtracks.com wrote "Everything about Tyler's music for 2022's Scream sounds proficient but absolutely none of it truly excels. The composer supplies the minimum necessary for a coherent continuation of the franchise's music, but the performances are stale and the dramatic passages fail to adequately emote. One of the original heroes dies in this film, and many others of the younger generation do as well, and yet Tyler supplies the conversational scenes of dread or lamentation with very little weight. An excessively long album presentation with cues out of chronological order doesn't help, the listening experience dragging significantly at several points. Tyler continues to prove himself a safe choice in these franchise takeovers, but he yet again leaves you wanting for the previous compositions."

In contrast, Justin Lockwood of Bloody Disgusting wrote: "Tyler did a fine job creating a score that effectively compliments this new chapter in the Scream universe. Like the writers and directors, he clearly took the assignment seriously and worked to uphold the franchise's standard. That it doesn't aggressively hit the nostalgic sweet spot may say more about us fans hung up on the past—a central theme of the new movie—than about any failings on Tyler's part." Todd Gilchrist of Fangoria commented: "as Scream 2022 is poised to rekindle our love for this franchise all over again, it will be interesting to see how Tyler's music manages that difficult balancing act for one more adventure; after 25 years, viewers have not only had slashers deconstructed, but commented on, reconstructed and revitalized, and it's this music that subverts our expectations while somehow also satisfying them, that makes that bumpy ride so enjoyable to take, over and over again." Brian Tallerico of RogerEbert.com commented "Brian Tyler's score elevates the brutal violence in death sequences that don't feel as casual or tongue-in-cheek as a lot of nostalgic horror tends to feel". Flickering Myth complimented Tyler's work as an "equally terrific score which pushes all the right buttons in all the right ways".

== Additional music ==
The film featured the following songs which were not released as a separate soundtrack album. Those include:

No.	Title	Writer(s)	Producer(s)	Length
1.	"True Love" (performed by Durand Jones & The Indications)	Aaron Frazer, Durand Jones & Blake Rhein		3:42
2.	"Just Us" (performed by DJ Khaled & SZA)	Blu June, André 3000, Brittany Coney, DJ Khaled, Big Boi, SZA & David Sheats		3:41
3.	"The American Scream" (performed by The Alkaline Trio)	Dan Andriano, Derek Grant & Matt Skiba		3:00
4.	"Turn to Hate" (performed by Orville Peck)	Daniel Pitout & Duncan Hay Jennings		4:56
5.	"Red Right Hand" (performed by Nick Cave & the Bad Seeds)	Nick Cave, Mick Harvey & Thomas Wydler		4:21
6.	"Pressure" (performed by Kamaiyah)	Kamaiyah, Randy Holmes & Leslie Wakefield		2:25
7.	"Guilty Conscience" (performed by 070 Shake)	070 Shake, Ben E. King, Jerry Leiber, Ahn Mitchell, Myles Moraites, William Moraites, Randolph Newman & Mike Stoller		3:33
8.	"Aww Shit!" (performed by Tha Alkaholiks)	E-Swift, William Curtis, J-Ro & Tash		3:53
9.	"Fall In Love" (performed by Caroline Kingsbury)	Caroline Kingsbury, Math Bishop & The Gifted		3:46
10.	"Take Me Where Your Heart Is" (performed by Q)	Q Marsden & Steven Marsden		3:13
11.	"High Priestess" (performed by Santigold)	Santigold, Ray Brady, Boys Noize, Simon Christensen & Ryan Olson		3:14
12.	"Fall Out of Love" (performed by Salem & Carlie Hanson)	William Gould & Matthew Reynolds	Peter Miles & Neil Kennedy	3:21
13.	"I Don't Want to Talk" (performed by Wallows)	Dylan Minnette, Braeden Lemasters, Cole Preston, Cole M.G.N. & Ariel Rechtshaid		3:08
Total length:				48:29

== See also ==
- Music of the Scream franchise
