= Sean Grandillo =

American actor, singer and musician (born 1992)

- Born: December 9, 1992 (age 33); Cleveland, Ohio, U.S.
- Education: Ithaca College
- Occupations: Actor; singer; musician
- Years active: 2012–present

Sean Grandillo (born December 9, 1992) is an American actor, singer and musician, known for his roles as the Voice of Otto in the 2015 Broadway revival of Spring Awakening, Eli Hudson in MTV's horror series Scream, Brett Young in ABC's comedy series The Real O'Neals, and Curly McLain in the 2021-2022 national tour of Oklahoma!.

== Early life ==
Grandillo was born in Cleveland, Ohio and raised in Aurora, Ohio. He was educated at Leighton Elementary School and graduated from Aurora High School. He went on to attend Ithaca College for musical theatre, before dropping out to join the cast of Spring Awakening in Los Angeles.

== Career ==
=== Acting ===
In 2014, Grandillo auditioned for Deaf West Theatre's production of Spring Awakening while on a break from college, and moved to Los Angeles two weeks later to star in the musical. He stayed with the company as the show transferred to Broadway, playing the double bass in the band and providing the Voice of Otto, while deaf actor Miles Barbee portrays the role of Otto Lämmermeier in sign language. In 2015, he guest appeared as Cooper in two episodes of ABC's crime drama series Secrets and Lies.

In January 2016, Grandillo guest-starred in a Mariska Hargitay-directed episode of NBC's legal drama series Law & Order: Special Victims Unit as Chris Roberts, a high school senior accused of sexually assaulting a freshman. He then appeared in Justin Kelly's gay porn drama film King Cobra, alongside James Franco. In March 2016, he was cast in the recurring role of Eli Hudson in the second season of MTV's horror series Scream. In the same year, Grandillo appeared as Miles Brekov in the Netflix mystery series, The OA. He recurred as Kenny's boyfriend, Brett Young, in the ABC comedy series The Real O'Neals. In 2018, Grandillo starred in the role of Colin Cowher on the comedy-drama series Youth & Consequences.

Grandillo began playing the role of Curly in the national tour of Oklahoma! on November 6, 2021.

In 2026, Grandillo returned to Broadway, originating the role of Dwayne in a musical adaptation of The Lost Boys.

=== Music ===
Grandillo's music career began with what started as a My Chemical Romance cover band called Rumored Alone.

On October 15, 2015, Grandillo released his first single, "New." In August 2016, he released his second single, "Why Is It so Hard to Change." On September 2, 2016, Grandillo released his first EP, also titled Why Is It so Hard to Change.

On August 25, 2017, Grandillo released his debut album titled Necessary Trouble on iTunes and Spotify.

== Personal life ==
He was previously dating Kimiko Glenn.

== Discography ==
=== Extended plays ===
Title	Details
Why Is It so Hard to Change	Released: September 2, 2016; Formats: Digital download; Label: Self-released

=== Singles ===
Title	Year	Album
"Break Free / Problem" (David Levitz and Sean Grandillo)	2014	Non-album singles
"Latch / All of Me" (David Levitz and Sean Grandillo)	2014	Non-album singles
"New"	2015	Non-album singles
"Why Is It so Hard to Change"	2016	Why Is It so Hard to Change

== Filmography ==
=== Film ===
Year	Title	Role	Notes
2012	Die from a Broken Heart	Rick	Short
2016	Madtown	Young Aaron Lewis	
2016	King Cobra	Caleb, Cobra Performer	
2018	In Reality	Scott	
2023	Summoning Sylvia	P.B.	

=== Television ===
Year	Title	Role	Notes
2015	Secrets and Lies	Cooper	2 episodes
2016	Law and Order: Special Victims Unit	Chris Roberts	Episode: "A Misunderstanding"
2016	Scream	Eli Hudson	9 episodes
2016	The OA	Miles Brekov	Episode: "Homecoming"
2016–2017	The Real O'Neals	Brett Young	6 episodes
2018	Youth & Consequences	Colin Cowher	8 episodes
2018	Rise	Jeremy Travers	10 episodes
2018	NCIS: New Orleans	Charlie Landry	Episode: "Risk Assessment"
2019	Indoor Boys	Blaine	7 episodes
2020	Blue Bloods	Charles Morrow	Episode: "The First 100 Days"
2020	Condor	Anders Crane	5 episodes

== Stage ==
Year	Title	Role	Location
2014	Spring Awakening	Voice of Otto	Deaf West Theatre
2015	Spring Awakening	Voice of Otto	Wallis Annenberg Center
2015–2016	Spring Awakening	Voice of Otto	Brooks Atkinson Theatre
2021-2022	Oklahoma!	Curly	
2026	The Lost Boys	Dwayne	Palace Theatre
