= Scream (TV series) =

2015 American slasher television series

- Also known as: Scream: The TV Series (seasons 1–2); Scream: Resurrection (season 3)
- Genre: Anthology; Slasher; Mystery; Teen drama
- Based on: Scream by Kevin Williamson
- Developed by: Jill Blotevogel; Dan Dworkin; Jay Beattie; Brett Matthews (season 3)
- Showrunners: Jill Blotevogel (season 1); Jaime Paglia (season 1); Michael Gans (season 2); Richard Register (season 2); Brett Matthews (season 3)
- Starring: Willa Fitzgerald; Bex Taylor-Klaus; John Karna; Amadeus Serafini; Connor Weil; Carlson Young; Jason Wiles; Tracy Middendorf; Tom Maden; Kiana Brown; Santiago Segura; RJ Cyler; Jessica Sula; Keke Palmer; Giorgia Whigham; C. J. Wallace; Tyga; Tyler Posey
- Composer: Jeremy Zuckerman
- Country of origin: United States
- Original language: English
- No. of seasons: 3
- No. of episodes: 30 (list of episodes)

Production
- Executive producers: Wes Craven (Note: Wes Craven let the production use his name and was credited as an executive producer, but was not involved in the series. Craven was posthumously credited in the second and third seasons.); Tony DiSanto; Liz Gateley; Marianne Maddalena; Cathy Konrad; Harvey Weinstein (seasons 1–2) (Note: Harvey Weinstein was involved in the third-season production, but was not credited following the series of sexual assault allegations that were brought against him.); Bob Weinstein (seasons 1–2) (Note: Bob Weinstein was involved in the third-season production, but was not credited following the series of sexual assault allegations that were brought against his brother.); Jill Blotevogel (season 1); Jaime Paglia (season 1); Michael Gans (season 2); Richard Register (season 2); Queen Latifah (season 3); Shakim Compere (season 3); Yaneley Arty (season 3); Brett Matthews (season 3)
- Producers: Matthew Signer; Keith Levine
- Production locations: Baton Rouge, Louisiana (season 1); New Orleans, Louisiana (season 2); Atlanta (season 3)
- Cinematography: Yaron Levy (seasons 1–2); David Daniel (season 3)
- Running time: 39–42 minutes
- Production companies: DiGa Vision; Dimension Television (seasons 1–2) (Note: Dimension Television was involved in the third season production, but was not credited following the series of sexual assault allegations that were brought against The Weinstein Company's co-founder, Harvey Weinstein.); MTV Production Development (seasons 1–2); Signpost Up Ahead (season 1); Louisiana Entertainment (seasons 1–2); Flavor Unit Entertainment (season 3)

Original release
- Network: MTV
- Release: June 30, 2015 – October 18, 2016
- Network: VH1
- Release: July 8 – July 10, 2019

Related
- Scream film series

Scream (officially Scream: The TV Series for the first two seasons, and Scream: Resurrection for the third) is an American anthology slasher television series developed by Jill Blotevogel, Dan Dworkin and Jay Beattie for MTV and Brett Matthews for VH1. It is based on the titular film series created by Kevin Williamson.

The series was originally produced by Dimension Television and MTV Production Development, and was filmed in Louisiana, in locations such as Baton Rouge and New Orleans. Blotevogel and Jaime Paglia originally served as showrunners during the first season before being replaced by Michael Gans and Richard Register in the second season, because of creative differences. The first two seasons were situated in the fictional town of Lakewood, where a string of murders took place. At the center of those murders was Emma Duval (played by Willa Fitzgerald), a teenage girl who is somehow tied to the town's dark past.

The series premiered on MTV on June 30, 2015, and concluded its first season on September 1, 2015. The series was officially picked up for a second season in July 2015. After its second season concluded, a two-hour Halloween special aired in October 2016.

In October 2016, MTV renewed the series for a third season. In April 2017, MTV announced that they were rebooting the series with the third season, with a new cast, setting, timeline, and production company. As part of the reboot process, it was revealed that Brett Matthews would be serving as the main showrunner. In addition, Queen Latifah, Shakim Compere and Yaneley Arty would be added as executive producers for the series under Flavor Unit Entertainment. RJ Cyler, C. J. Wallace, Tyga, Keke Palmer, Jessica Sula, Giorgia Whigham, Giullian Yao Gioiello and Tyler Posey starred in the rebooted third season. In June 2019, it was announced that the series would be moving to VH1 ahead of the premiere of the third and final season. The season, subtitled Resurrection, premiered on July 8, 2019.

== Premise ==
Scream is a serialized anthology series that follows a group of teenagers being stalked and targeted by a masked serial killer.

The first two seasons, set in a fictional version of the town of Lakewood, Colorado, follow the story of Emma Duval (Fitzgerald), a teenage girl, who is linked to the horrific events of the town's past. As the killer's main obsession starts to take a hold after a brutal murder in the present day, Emma finds herself in the center of imminent peril. With both family and friends in danger, she sets out to uncover the town's secrets and unmask the identity of the Lakewood Slasher.

The third season follows the story of Deion Elliot, a local football star in Atlanta, who is tormented by the events of his tragic past. As Ghostface uses his darkest secrets against him and continues with a killing spree, Deion not only stands to lose his future, but also, the lives of his friends and family members, who might end up being potential victims of the notorious and infamous killer.

== Cast and characters ==
=== Main ===
- Willa Fitzgerald as Emma Duval, a popular high school student and local barista who becomes the primary target of the Lakewood Slasher (season 1–2). The character was based on Sidney Prescott in the film series.
- Bex Taylor-Klaus as Audrey Jensen, a sarcastic, bicurious filmmaker who had a falling out with Emma during their childhood (season 1–2).
- John Karna as Noah Foster, a witty and intelligent nerd who has a vast knowledge about horror films (season 1–2). The character was based on Randy Meeks in the film series.
- Amadeus Serafini as Kieran Wilcox, a new student who becomes Emma's main love interest (season 1–2). The character is based on Bllly Loomis in the first film.
- Connor Weil as Will Belmont, a poor but popular basketball player and Emma's ex-boyfriend (season 1).
- Carlson Young as Brooke Maddox, a wealthy and popular, but troubled, student and the daughter of Lakewood's mayor (season 1–2). The character was based on Tatum Riley in the first film.
- Jason Wiles as Clark Hudson, Kieran's biological father and the sheriff of Lakewood. He develops a relationship with Emma's mother, Maggie (season 1). The character is loosely based on Dewey Riley in the film series.
- Tracy Middendorf as Maggie Duval, Emma's mother and the Lakewood medical examiner. She conceals her history with Brandon James (season 1–2). The character is loosely based on Maureen Prescott in the first and third films.
- Kiana Brown as Zoe Vaughn, an overachieving intellect who harbors a secret. She becomes Noah's new love interest in the second season (season 2).
- Santiago Segura as Gustavo "Stavo" Acosta, a new student and skilled artist who is interested in the horror genre, serial killers and comic books. (season 2)
- RJ Cyler as Marcus Elliot, a successful, star football player who becomes the primary target of Ghostface, and Deion Elliot, Marcus’ deceased twin brother whose identity he takes on after his death (season 3).
- Jessica Sula as Olivia "Liv" Reynolds, a new student prior to the events of the series who becomes Marcus’ main love interest. She is a cheerleader, honor roll student, and daughter of a police officer (season 3).
- Keke Palmer as Kym, a bold, rebellious student and dedicated social activist (season 3).
- Giorgia Whigham as Beth, an outspoken goth student and tattoo artist. She is extremely fond of horror films (season 3).
- C. J. Wallace as Amir Ayoub, a good-natured student who aspires to pursue music, but is forced to work in the family business as a result of his strict parents. He develops a relationship with Beth (season 3).
- Tyga as Jamal "Jay" Elliot, Marcus’ older, half-brother who associates with tough and potentially dangerous individuals (season 3).
- Tyler Posey as Shane, a high school dropout who works as both drug dealer and party promoter. He has a sexual relationship with Beth (season 3).

=== Recurring ===
- Bobby Campo as Seth Branson (season 1; guest season 2), a teacher who has a secret relationship with Brooke in the first season.
- Brianne Tju as Riley Marra (season 1), a popular, cheerful student and a best friend of Emma and Brooke. She becomes Noah's main love interest in the first season.
- Sosie Bacon as Rachel Murray (season 1; guest season 2), Audrey's girlfriend who attends an all-girls' catholic school. She has suicidal intentions as a result of bullying.
- Sophina Brown as Lorraine Brock (season 1), a detective assigned to the Lakewood murders case and a previous lover of Sheriff Hudson.
- Bella Thorne as Nina Patterson (season 1; guest season 2), a wealthy and popular, but rude and possibly sociopathic student who is the first victim in the series, and whose gruesome murder sparks the events of the first two seasons. The character is loosely based on Casey Becker in the first film.
- Amelia Rose Blaire as Piper Shaw (season 1; guest season 2), a podcaster who comes to Lakewood to investigate the recent murders. The character is loosely based on Gale Weathers in the film series and Jill Roberts in the fourth film.
- Tom Maden as Jake Fitzgerald (season 1; guest season 2), a wealthy and popular but mischievous basketball player, Brooke's on-and-off boyfriend, and Will's former best friend.
- Bryan Batt as Mayor Quinn Maddox (season 1-2), Brooke's father and the mayor of Lakewood. He hides secrets from the town that surround illegal business deals and cover-ups.
- Mike Vaughn as the voices of the Lakewood Slasher and the Shallow Grove Slasher (season 1-2).
- Austin Highsmith as Kristen Lang (season 2), an idealistic high school psychology teacher who becomes a confidant and mentor to her students. She is in a secret relationship with Seth Branson in the second season.
- Sean Grandillo as Eli Hudson (season 2), Kieran's cousin with an undisclosed knowledge of his past. He presents a squeaky clean image but has ulterior motives. He takes an interest in Emma.
- Karina Logue as Tina Hudson (season 2), Eli's mother and Kieran's aunt, who becomes Kieran's legal guardian after the events of the first season. She is proper and polite but with a grifter's sense of self-reliance.
- Mary Katherine Duhon as Haley Meyers (season 2), an outspoken classmate who strongly dislikes Emma and Audrey.
- Tom Everett Scott as Kevin Duval (season 2; guest season 1), Emma's estranged father and Maggie's ex-husband. In the second season, he attempts to reconnect with Emma. The character is loosely based on Neil Prescott in the first and third films.
- Anthony Ruivivar as Miguel Acosta (season 2), the new, competent and experienced sheriff who returns to his childhood home of Lakewood. He is the single father of Stavo.
- Giullian Yao Gioiello as Manny (season 3), an intelligent, asthmatic, gay student and Kym's best friend.
- Mary J. Blige as Sherry Elliot (season 3), Deion's mother who often worries about the pressure of his future career in football.
- Diesel Madkins as Earl Elliot (season 3), Deion's distant father and a trucker.
- Gideon Emery as T. Reynolds (season 3), Liv's strict, controlling father and a police officer.
- Patrick Johnson as Avery Collins (season 3), Liv's ex-boyfriend and Deion's rival on the football team.
- Drew Starkey as Hawkins (season 3), a friend of Deion on the football team.
- Paris Jackson as Becky (season 3).
- Terrence J as Coach Griffin (season 3), Deion's football coach.
- Tony Todd as Hook Man (season 3), a deranged, mysterious man who lives in an abandoned car lot. Deion believes he killed Marcus.
- Roger L. Jackson as the voice of Ghostface (season 3).

== Episodes ==
Season	Episodes	Originally released		
Season	Episodes	First released	Last released	Network
1	10	June 30, 2015	September 1, 2015	MTV
2	14	May 30, 2016	October 18, 2016	MTV
3	6	July 8, 2019	July 10, 2019	VH1

== Production ==
=== Development ===
In June 2012, it was reported that MTV was in the early stages of developing a weekly television series based on the Scream film franchise. In April 2013, The Hollywood Reporter confirmed that MTV had greenlit the pilot episode, with Wes Craven in talks to direct. In July 2013, it was reported that Jay Beattie and Dan Dworkin had officially boarded the project to write the pilot script and in April 2014, it was reported by TVLine that the series would be penned by Jill Blotevogel. In August 2014, the series announced its cast as well as the director of the pilot episode, Jamie Travis. The series was originally planned to debut in mid-2014, however, this was changed to summer 2015.

On April 12, 2015, the first trailer for the series was aired during the 2015 MTV Movie Awards presented by Bella Thorne, who appears in a supporting role, also revealing the series' premiere date of June 30.

In May 2015, MTV released the series' promotional campaign "Killer Party". The single-take ad features Rilo Kiley's "It Just Is" over a "dead" house party attended by cast members of various MTV shows including Ashley Rickards, Molly Tarlov (Awkward), Rita Volk, Katie Stevens (Faking It), Johnny Bananas, Leroy Garrett (The Real World and The Challenge), Chanel West Coast, Steelo Brim (Ridiculousness), Anna Jacoby-Heron (Finding Carter), and Tyler Posey (Teen Wolf) as the shows cast rings the doorbell before John Karna's character remarks "It sounds dead in there." Directed by MTV's Patrick Cummings and Matt Jenson, the promo was shot in a single weekend in Los Angeles and required gallons of fake blood. MTV's senior vice president for creative Joe Ortiz noted the promo referenced the "meta commentary" that Kevin Williamson captured for the original film.

An official promotional picture of the series' re-imagined mask was revealed in early June 2015. Initially, Craven expressed his approval of the redesign and hinted at its origins and possible plot significance. However, Craven was later critical about the network's decision to abandon the Ghostface mask in the television series. Later, it was reported that there were preliminary discussions about incorporating the mask in the first two seasons. However, the initial plans were scrapped in favor of a new mask, due to creative reasons. Sometime after the announcement of the reboot, MTV made a deal with Fun World, in order to acquire the licensing rights to the Ghostface mask for the series.

The series was officially picked up for a second season on July 29, 2015. On November 9, 2015, it was announced that Jill Blotevogel and Jaime Paglia would be stepping down as showrunners due to creative differences, although Blotevogel would remain a consultant on the series. Michael Gans and Richard Register replaced them for the second season. On May 2, 2016, the official trailer for the second season was released. The second-season premiere date was changed to May 30, 2016. On October 14, 2016, MTV renewed the series for a six-episode third season, and announced that the showrunners would be replaced again.

On April 26, 2017, MTV announced that Queen Latifah would be an executive producer for the third season of Scream. The series underwent a reboot with a new cast and Brett Matthews serving as showrunner. In addition, it was announced that Matthews, Shakim Compere and Yaneley Arty would also be credited as executive producers for the series under Flavor Unit Entertainment. On July 19, 2017, The Hollywood Reporter announced that the series would transition into an anthology series in the third season. This information was corroborated by MTV president Chris McCarthy.

On September 18, 2017, it was announced that the Ghostface mask from the film series would be making an appearance in the third season. On October 10, 2017, Keke Palmer confirmed in an interview that Roger L. Jackson, who voiced Ghostface in the film series, would return for the third season, replacing Mike Vaughn, who served as the voice for two characters, the Lakewood Slasher in the first two seasons and the Shallow Grove Slasher in the Halloween special episodes of the second season.

On March 28, 2018, it was confirmed that Harvey Weinstein would not be credited as an executive producer in the third season, due to a series of sexual assault allegations. In addition, the series would not include The Weinstein Company or its logo in its credits from the third season onward, even though the company was formerly involved in the distribution of the series.

On June 24, 2019, it was confirmed that the third season was scheduled to premiere over three nights on VH1, starting from July 8, 2019. On July 1, 2019, the official trailer for Scream: Resurrection was released.

=== Casting ===
On August 5, 2014, both the main cast and recurring cast were announced. However the same month, it was announced that the role of Audrey Jensen, which was originally supposed to be captured by Amy Forsyth, woild be recast with Bex Taylor-Klaus, replacing Forsyth. On December 11, 2014, it was revealed that Bella Thorne would be a part of the cast, she played the character Nina Patterson. Thorne confirmed this during an interview saying, "Yes it's true. I will re-enact the famous scene of Drew Barrymore in the original series." On February 22, 2015, it was revealed that Joel Gretsch, who was playing Clark Hudson, had left the series as producers thought his character should go down a different path; he was replaced by Jason Wiles. On April 22, 2015, True Blood actress Amelia Rose Blaire was confirmed to be joining the series as Piper Shaw which, by the character description, is a role similar to Gale Weathers from the Scream films.

On June 18, 2015, Bella Thorne confirmed she was offered the lead role in the series but turned it down in favor of a smaller role. She went on to explain, "I had the option to do the lead, but I thought I should choose this role because I felt it was more iconic, I thought it was just a little bit more and also I've never been killed on screen before. I've never been killed ever on anything that I've done. I've always been the character that lives at the end so it was my first time dying on screen which is pretty cool. I wouldn't say that my character isn't necessarily in any more of the episodes but you'll see!" In 2016, Lele Pons appeared in a similar cameo capacity in the beginning of the second season. The scene paid homage to Scream 2, with Pons' character Leah, an actress from the in-show film Murderville, being thrown off a house by a killer, Becca (Chelsea Bruland).

It was announced on July 17, 2017, that Tyga and C. J. Wallace would star in the rebooted third season. On September 13, 2017, it was announced that RJ Cyler, Jessica Sula, Keke Palmer, Giullian Yao Gioiello, and Giorgia Whigham had joined the main cast of the third season in addition to the previously announced cast members. On September 25, 2017, it was announced that Tyler Posey had been cast as a series regular in the role of Shane. Posey previously appeared in the series' promo titled "Killer Party", playing a fictionalized version of himself. On August 16, 2018, it was announced that Mary J. Blige had been cast in the role of Deion's mother, Sherry Elliot. On October 12, 2018, it was announced that Tony Todd would appear as Luther Thompson / Hook Man. On June 24, 2019, it was confirmed that Paris Jackson would make an appearance as the character Becky in the third season's first episode "The Deadfast Club". Similar to Thorne and Pons, Paris Jackson will make a cameo in the opening scene of the third season's first episode, paying homage to the opening of the original film.

=== Filming ===
Filming of season one took place in Baton Rouge, Louisiana from April through July 2015. Filming for the second season began on February 16, 2016 through July 2016, and took place in New Orleans. Filming for the third season began on September 18, 2017, and concluded on November 11, 2017, in Atlanta, Georgia.

=== Music ===
Two official soundtrack albums have been released by MTV. The first season's soundtrack was released on August 14, 2015, under Columbia Records. The second season's soundtrack was released on July 29, 2016, under Island Records. The score soundtrack for the series' first two seasons composed by Jeremy Zuckerman, was released by Lakeshore Records on October 28, 2016.

Scream: Music from Season One
No.	Title	Artist	Length
1.	"Mine"	Phoebe Ryan	3:46
2.	"When I Rule the World"	Liz	3:07
3.	"You're the Best"	Wet	2:57
4.	"Monsters"	Ruelle	3:12
5.	"All the Things Lost"	MS MR	3:14
6.	"Set This Heart on Fire"	machineheart	3:28
7.	"Rescue My Heart"	Liz Longley	3:18
8.	"Star Spangled"	REMMI	3:01
9.	"Spectacular Rival"	George Ezra	4:15
10.	"There's a Ghost"	Fleurie	3:11
Total length:			33:29

Scream: Music from Season Two
No.	Title	Artist	Length
1.	"River"	Bishop Briggs	3:34
2.	"I Took a Pill in Ibiza" (Seeb Remix)	Mike Posner	3:15
3.	"Money"	Poppy	3:10
4.	"One in a Million" (Kant Remix)	Midnight To Monaco	5:50
5.	"Hurts So Good"	Astrid S	3:28
6.	"Breathe" (featuring Neev)	Seeb	3:58
7.	"Make Them Wheels Roll"	Safia	4:05
8.	"In the Arms of a Stranger" (Brian Kierulf Remix)	Mike Posner	3:26
9.	"Figure You Out"	Keke Palmer	3:25
Total length:			34:11

=== Scream After Dark ===
Scream After Dark is a talk show hosted by Jeffery Self, which features behind the scenes footage, and guests discussing episodes of Scream. The first instalment followed the season two premiere and featured Willa Fitzgerald, Bex Taylor-Klaus, John Karna, Amadeus Serafini, Carlson Young, and Kiana Brown, and received 185,000 viewers. The second instalment aired following episode eight and featured Fitzgerald, Taylor-Klaus, Karna, Young, Brown, Santiago Segura, and Sean Grandillo, and received 201,000 viewers. The third and final installment aired following the season two finale and featured Fitzgerald, Taylor-Klaus, Karna, Young, and Serafini, and averaged 145,000 viewers.

=== Web series ===
Scream: If I Die is a web series about the six survivors of Lakewood are recorded a video to share their last words and thoughts, before one of them will be murdered by a new Lakewood Slasher killer, leading the events of the second season.

== Broadcast ==
Scream premiered on MTV on June 30, 2015, in the United States. The first season concluded on September 1, 2015. Internationally, Netflix acquired the exclusive international broadcast rights to the series, making the entire first season available on October 1, 2015, on its platform, as an original series. In the United States, the first season was released on Netflix on May 13, 2016.

The second season premiered on MTV May 30, 2016, and concluded on August 16, 2016, in the United States. It was followed by a two-hour Halloween special that aired on October 18, 2016. Internationally, Netflix released episodes weekly, less than a day after their original U.S. broadcast. In the United States, the second season was released on Netflix on September 30, 2016.

The third and final season, subtitled Resurrection, premiered over three nights on VH1 in the United States, starting on July 8, 2019, and concluded on July 10, 2019. On July 17, 2018, The Hollywood Reporter confirmed that in the midst of Lantern Entertainment's acquisition of the assets of The Weinstein Company, a former output deal between The Weinstein Company and Netflix was terminated. As a result, the third season was not broadcast on Netflix internationally. In the United States, the third season was released on Netflix on September 1, 2019.

== Reception ==
=== Critical response ===
Critical response of Scream
Season	Rotten Tomatoes	Metacritic
1	53% (43 reviews)	57 (21 reviews)
2	92% (12 reviews)	—N/a
3	40% (5 reviews)	—N/a

The first season of Scream received an overall mixed response. On review aggregation website Rotten Tomatoes, the first season received an approval rating of 53% based on 43 reviews, with a 5.45/10 average rating. The site's critical consensus reads: "Lacking truly compelling characters or scenarios, Scream is formed to trade too heavily on nostalgia for its big-screen predecessors in the franchise." On Metacritic, which assigns a normalized rating, the first season has a weighted average score of 57 out of 100, based on reviews from 21 critics, indicating "mixed or average reviews".

In a positive review, David Hinckley from New York Daily News awarded the pilot four out of five stars and stated, "Happily, Scream maintains a sense of humor, reinforced with snappy, self-aware pop culture dialogue." Similarly, Brian Lowry of Variety commended the series' ability to maintain suspense "without much actually happening during the rest of the episode," noting its use of music, but expressing skepticism if the series could maintain its originality. Aedan Juvet of PopWrapped gave a positive assessment of the series and called it, "a prime example of a game-changing horror series". Conversely, David Wiegand of the San Francisco Chronicle panned the series and gave it one out of four stars, criticizing the acting performances as "bland, robotic, and uninteresting" as well as its apparent lack of racial diversity. In a mixed review, Mark Perigard of the Boston Herald gave the series a C+, saying, "There are a few scares here, but while the Scream films kept audiences jumping, Scream: The TV Series risks putting viewers to sleep."

The second season received more positive reviews with an approval rating of 92% on Rotten Tomatoes based on reviews from 12 critics. The site's critical consensus reads: "Undeniably gripping and wickedly sharp, Scream returns with a killer sophomore season that manages to go further into its murderous ethos."

The third season received mixed reviews, with an approval rating of 40% on Rotten Tomatoes based on reviews from 5 critics. "The cast this year is much more diverse,"' Karen Rought of Hypable wrote, "Scream season 3 shines in its character portrayal but falls flat with the horror." Opposing, Paul Dailly of TV Fanatic wrote, "This new killer is just as creative as the ones from the movie series."

=== Ratings ===
Viewership and ratings per season of Scream
Season	Timeslot (ET)	Episodes	First aired		Last aired		TV season	Avg. viewers (millions)
Season	Timeslot (ET)	Episodes	Date	Viewers (millions)	Date	Viewers (millions)	TV season	Avg. viewers (millions)
1	Tuesday 10:00 p.m.	10	June 30, 2015	1.03	September 1, 2015	0.76	2014–15	0.75
2	Monday 11:00 p.m. (1–4); Tuesday 10:00 p.m. (5–14) (Note: The thirteenth episode aired on a Tuesday at 9:00 p.m.)	14	May 30, 2016	0.40	October 18, 2016	0.34	2015–16	0.38
3	Monday–Wednesday 9:00 p.m. (Note: The third season was broadcast over three consecutive days.)	6	July 8, 2019	0.79	July 10, 2019	0.33	2019–20	0.47

=== Home media ===
The first season was released on DVD on May 10, 2016, by Anchor Bay Entertainment, and was grossed $251,650 in home sales. However, there is no DVD set for the remaining two seasons of the series.

== Awards and nominations ==
Year	Ceremony	Category	Nominee(s)	Result	Ref.
2015	Teen Choice Awards	Choice Summer TV Show	Scream	Nominated	
2015	Teen Choice Awards	Choice Summer TV Star: Female	Willa Fitzgerald	Nominated	
2015	Teen Choice Awards	Choice TV: Scene Stealer	Bella Thorne	Nominated	
2015	TV Guide Awards	Favorite Horror Series	Scream	Won	
2015	TV Guide Awards	Favorite Villain	Amelia Rose Blaire	Won	
2015	TV Guide Awards	Music Series of the Year	Scream	Won	
2016	Leo Awards	Best Supporting Actress in a Drama Series	Carlson Young	Nominated	
2016	MTV Fandom Awards	Best New Fandom of the Year	Scream	Nominated	
