= Amadeus Serafini =

American actor

- Born: Amadeus Fermin Dash-Serafini; July 7, 1990 (age 36); California, U.S.
- Occupation: Actor
- Years active: 2013–present

Amadeus Serafini (born July 7, 1990) is an American actor from California. He is known for his role as Kieran Wilcox in the first two seasons of MTV's slasher series Scream.

== Career ==
Serafini started his career with a role in the short film Smoke (2013), and a minor role in the short web series Oh La La, Hollywood Speaks French! (2014) In 2015, he starred as Kieran Wilcox in the MTV horror series Scream. In 2018, Serafini guest starred as Josh in the web television series Impulse, and starred as Terry in the independent comedy film Summer Days, Summer Nights. In 2023, he starred as Henry Van Horne in the independent action-thriller Hidden Strike alongside John Cena and Jackie Chan. In 2024, Serafini starred in the romantic comedy film Wallbanger directed by Tosca Musk.

== Filmography ==
=== Film ===
Key
†	Denotes films that have not yet been released

Year	Title	Role	Notes
2018	Summer Days, Summer Nights	Terry	
2020	Smiley Face Killers	Gabriel	
2023	Hidden Strike	Henry Van Horne	
2024	Final Heist	Carl	
2024	Wallbanger	Simon	
2024	The Painted	Iver Franco	
2025	Where Did the Adults Go?	Bryce	

=== Television ===
Year	Title	Role	Notes
2015–2016	Scream	Kieran Wilcox	Main (seasons 1–2)
2018	Impulse	Josh	2 episodes
2022	Silence	Stavo	Main (1–2)

=== Web ===
Year	Title	Role	Notes
2014	Oh La La, Hollywood Speaks French!	Theo / Lulu	3 episodes
2016	Scream: If I Die	Kieran Wilcox	Episode: "Thank You Lakewood"
