= Connor Weil =

American actor (born 1993)

- Born: December 28, 1993 (age 32); Portland, Oregon, United States
- Occupation: Actor
- Years active: 2010–present
- Known for: Scream

Connor Weil is an American actor. He is best known for his role as Will Belmont on the first season of MTV's Scream.

== Career ==
In April 2016, Weil was revealed to have joined the cast of the NBC Daytime soap opera Days of Our Lives.

== Filmography ==
=== Film ===
| Year | Title | Role | Notes |
|---|---|---|---|
| 2010 | Lies in Plain Sight | Derek | |
| 2011 | Hollywood Tale | Party Guest | Short |
| 2012 | 1313: Frankenqueen | Matt | Video |
| 2015 | McFarland, USA | Palo Alto Runner #1 | |
| 2015 | Scream: Killer Party | Will Belmont | Short |
| 2016 | Gratuitous Violence | Trevor | Short |
| 2018 | Paved New World | FSU skater | |
| 2018 | Black Pumpkin | Ace Barker | |
| 2019 | Being and Nothingness | Cody | Short |
| 2020 | Reality Queen! | Nikk | |
| 2022 | Living Dead Presents: Fog City | Jeremiah Kingsley | |
| 2022 | Skate God | Yurisses | |
| 2022 | Mission Street | Mike | |
| 2023 | Fog City | Jeremiah Kingsley | |
| 2024 | Mea Culpa | Bobby | |

=== Television ===
| Year | Title | Role | Notes |
|---|---|---|---|
| 2011 | A.N.T. Farm | Legan | Episode: "TransplANTed" |
| 2011 | Victorious | First Mate | Episode: "Tori Gets Stuck" |
| 2012 | The Jadagrace Show | Bradley | 10 episodes |
| 2013 | Anatomy of Violence | Young Party Goer | TV movie |
| 2013 | Crash & Bernstein | Spencer | Episode: "Cold Hard Crash" |
| 2013 | The Young and the Restless | Bully | Episode: 1.10164 |
| 2013 | The Tonight Show with Jay Leno | Student | Episode: 21.203 |
| 2013 | Liv and Maddie | Miller | Episode: "Skate-A-Rooney" |
| 2013 | Dirty Teacher | Trent | TV movie |
| 2013 | Sharknado | Luellyn | TV movie |
| 2014 | Death Clique | Clay | TV movie |
| 2014 | Kickin' It | J. P. | Episode: "Seaford Hustle" |
| 2014 | Annie Undocumented | Ethan | |
| 2015 | Scream | Will Belmont | Main cast (season 1) |
| 2015 | The Goldbergs | Steve Kremp | Episode: "A Christmas Story" |
| 2016 | Days of Our Lives | Mark McNair | 4 episodes |
| 2016 | Roadies | Young Phil | Episodes: "The All Night Bus Ride", "The Corporate Gig" and "The Load Out" |
| 2016–2017 | Foursome | Mr. Zapp | Recurring role, 5 episodes |
| 2017 | NCIS: Los Angeles | Navy Lieutenant Warren Miller | Episode: "Old Tricks" |
| 2017–18 | K.C. Undercover | Brady | Recurring role, 11 episodes |
| 2018 | Bad Indians | Brad | Episode: "Bad Indians" |
| 2022 | Acapulco | Chad #3 | Episode: "Glory Days" |
| 2022 | Little America | Bradley | Episode: "Space Door" |
| 2023 | Obliterated | Dane | Episode:"Craps" |
| 2025 | Chicago P.D. | John Knight | Episode:"Friends and Family" |
