= C. J. Wallace (actor) =

American actor (born 1996)

- Born: Christopher Jordan Wallace; October 29, 1996 (age 29); New York City, U.S.
- Occupations: Actor; entrepreneur
- Years active: 2008–present
- Parent(s): The Notorious B.I.G. Faith Evans

Christopher Jordan Wallace (born October 29, 1996), also known as CJ and Lil Biggie, is an American actor and entrepreneur. (Note: According to his paternal grandmother Voletta Wallace's autobiography, CJ's middle name is Jordan, not George Latore like his father: "Christopher [Biggie] was a fan of Michael Jordan's, so he thought about Michael for a middle name, then decided on Jordan. And that was it: Christopher Jordan Wallace.") He is the son of the renowned rapper The Notorious B.I.G and American singer Faith Evans.

== Early life ==
Christopher Jordan Wallace was born in New York City on October 29, 1996. His father Christopher "The Notorious B.I.G." Wallace was murdered in March 1997, when Wallace was just five months old. CJ was raised by Evans and his stepfather Todd Russaw. His paternal grandparents were from Jamaica, his maternal grandfather was of English and possibly Italian descent and his maternal grandmother was Helene Evans, a Black professional singer.

== Career ==
Wallace's breakthrough role was in the 2009 biopic Notorious, where he portrayed his father as a young boy. In 2010, he starred in the comedy film Everything Must Go, but did not have another acting role until starring in the 2016 adventure film Kicks. In 2019, he played Amir in the third season of the VH1 slasher series Scream.

Wallace, together with his stepfather Todd Russaw and entrepreneur Willie Mack, launched a cannabis company called Think BIG in March 2019. In April 2019, the company launched a brand of cannabis called Frank White, named after Wallace's father's alter-ego, as well as pre-rolls of cannabis in collaboration with Lowell Herb Co. Wallace has also partnered with brands such as Lexus, Mitchell & Ness, State Bicycle Co. Santa Cruz Shredder and more.

In August 2020, Wallace released "Big Poppa (House Mix)", remixing his father's classic hit single with Sean Combs, in conjunction with Mack and Jonathan Hay. Wallace and his sister T'Yanna later gave acceptance speeches on behalf of their father, following The Notorious B.I.G.'s induction into the Rock and Roll Hall of Fame.

In 2023, Wallace starred with Christian "King" Combs, Quincy Brown and Justin Combs on the Paramount+ network show MTV's Family Legacy.

== Legal issues ==
In July 2025, a record producer who had worked with Wallace sued him, alleging that he had helped Sean Combs sexually assault him. The Los Angeles County Sheriff's Department began an investigation. Wallace and Combs deny these allegations. That November, Wallace filed a defamation suit against the producer, alleging that he made false claims because of a professional dispute.

== Filmography ==
=== Film ===
Year	Title	Role	Notes
2009	Notorious	Young Christopher Wallace	
2010	Everything Must Go	Kenny	
2016	Kicks	Albert	
2018	Monsters and Men	Kael	
2019	She's Missing	Taylor	

=== Television ===
Year	Title	Role	Notes
2019	Scream: Resurrection	Amir Ayoub	Main role (season 3)
2023	MTV's Family Legacy	Himself	Main role
