= East of Middle West =

2021 American drama film

- Theatrical film poster
- Directed by: Brian Lucke Anderson
- Written by: Mokotsi Rukundo
- Produced by: Brian Lucke Anderson; Mokotsi Rukundo
- Starring: Carson MacCormac; Scott McCord; Joris Jarsky
- Cinematography: Andrew Shankweiler
- Edited by: Glen Montgomery
- Music by: Adam Robl; Shawn Sutta
- Release dates: April 24, 2021 (JDIFF); April 8, 2022 (USA)
- Running time: 104 mins.
- Country: United States
- Language: English

East of Middle West is a 2021 American crime drama film, directed by Brian Lucke Anderson and written by Mokotsi Rukundo. The film stars Carson MacCormac, Scott McCord, and Joris Jarsky. It premiered at the Julien Dubuque International Film Festival in 2021, before its limited theatrical release throughout the United States the following year.

== Synopsis ==
A teenage runaway and a widowed father each fight to take matters into their own hands to redeem their dark past.

== Cast ==
- Carson MacCormac as Chris
- Scott McCord as Bill
- Joris Jarsky as Denny
- Yve Rojas as Margaret
- Sophie Hoyt as Amy
- Ira Amyx as Skip
- Bridgette Bassa as Diane
- Luke Charles Stafford as Tom Hawkins

== Reception ==
Joshua M. Hayes of Josh At The Movies lauded the performances, particularly the "electrifying turn" from Carson MacCormac: "... in a powerful and unforgettable sequence acted masterfully by MacCormac and Joris Jarsky...Sophie Hoyt plays Chris’s spunky, but complicated, love interest, Amy, with a snarky playfulness...Scott McCord's Bill gives major unhinged lunatic energy, and every second of his performance is psychotically excellent. However, at the end of the day, MacCormac and Jarsky are the most vital pieces to the puzzle. Each performance is terrific and nuanced."

Hal Peterson of Chucks Connection applauded the filmmakers: "There is a lot of great work in this film, starting with the screenplay by Mokotsi Rukundo and the direction of Brian Lucke Anderson." Haneen Eltyeb of West Side Story praised the use of rural Iowa's landscape: "The scenes of rural Iowa emphasize the idea that smaller towns tend to carry more secrecy and ambiguity."
