= Scott McCord =

Canadian actor

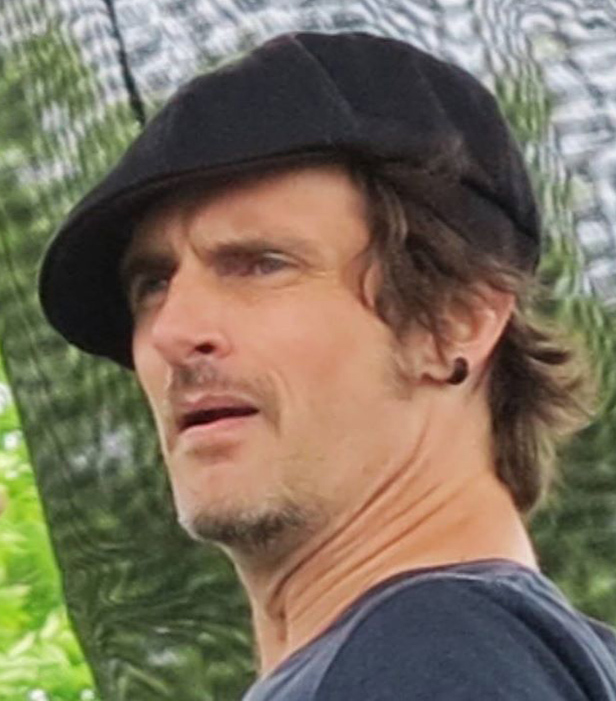
- McCord in 2013
- Occupation: Actor
- Years active: 1996–present
- Spouse: Kelsey Matheson-McCord (m. 2008)
- Children: 1
- Website: thisisscottmccord.com

Scott McCord is a Canadian actor. He has performed on film, television, animation and on stage. He is a member of The Actors Studio. On television, he has appeared in series regular, recurring and guest starring roles. He is also known for voice-over work, most notably providing the voice of Owen and others in the Total Drama series.

== Career ==
McCord is known for his portrayal of Victor in the MGM+ original science fiction horror series From. Other television appearances include The Sinner, FBI, Jupiter's Legacy, and Lost Girl. He played researcher James Joy on the Canadian investigative journalism drama series The Eleventh Hour from 2002 to 2005. He has also appeared in standout character roles in the studio films16 Blocks, Shoot 'Em Up, and supporting roles in independent films East of Middle West, Blood Honey and the animated features The Nut Job and Charlotte. He has worked in theatre most of his career in New York and Toronto, garnering a Dora Mavor Moore Award Best Actor nomination in 2002 for The Qualities of Zero.

He is also known for his voiceover work in animated series, most notably providing the voice of multiple characters in Fresh TV's Total Drama series, including Owen, Trent, Jacques, and Brody. McCord has voiced other roles such as Dan Kuso in the English dub of Bakugan Battle Brawlers, Yang and Yuck in Yin Yang Yo!, Tetsuya Watarigani in Beyblade: Metal Fusion, Skull Boy in Ruby Gloom, McGee in Camp Lakebottom, and Jake in the animated Nickelodeon/TVOKids television series Paw Patrol. In 2016, he won the Canada Screens Award for Best Performance in an Animated Series.

== Filmography ==
=== Television ===
Year	Title	Role
1996–1998	Stickin' Around	Additional Voices
1998	Mythic Warriors	Phineus, Soldier #1
1999	The City	Raymona
1999	Psi Factor: Chronicles of the Paranormal	Victor Granger
2000	In a Heartbeat	Danny
2001	The Famous Jett Jackson	Casper Carruth
2001–2002	Pecola	Jabatt
2001–2002	Rolie Polie Olie	Cuckoo
2002	The Associates	Ari Katzen
2002	Tracker	Rudy/Yahir
2002	Soul Food	Zeke Fabulous
2002–2005	The Eleventh Hour	James Joy
2004–2008	Miss Spider's Sunny Patch Friends	Stinky
2005	Slam Dunk	Kaede Rukawa
2005–2006	Time Warp Trio	Fred
2006	This Is Wonderland	Duncan Armstrong
2006–2009	Erky Perky	Additional voices
2006–2009	Yin Yang Yo!	Yang, Yuck
2006–2007	Instant Star	Iggy, additional voices
2006–2008	Bigfoot Presents: Meteor and the Mighty Monster Trucks	Little Tow
2006–2008	6teen	Stone, Griffin
2006–2008	Growing Up Creepie	George Hollyruller, additional voices
2006–2008	Ruby Gloom	Skull Boy
2007–2013, 2024	Total Drama	Owen, Trent
2007–2008	Bakugan Battle Brawlers	Dan Kuso, Frosch, Centorrior
2007–2008	Atomic Betty	Chaz Lang, additional voices
2008	Urban Vermin	Ken
2008	Toot & Puddle	Additional voices
2008–2009	Friends and Heroes	Dudemus
2009	Dex Hamilton: Alien Entomologist	Uncle Leech
2009–2010	Bakugan Battle Brawlers: New Vestroia	Dan Kuso, Frosch, Percival, Professor Clay
2009–2012	Beyblade: Metal Fusion	Tetsuya Watarigani
2010	Magi-Nation	Guardian Hyren of Arderial, Gazean, Nelphab
2010–2011	Bakugan Battle Brawlers: Gundalian Invaders	Dan Kuso, Strikeflyer
2010, 2013	Skatoony	Owen
2010–2015	Babar and the Adventures of Badou	Additional voices
2011	MetaJets	Zak Kim
2011	The Cat in the Hat Knows a Lot About That!	Toshio, Eddie, Charlie, additional voices
2011–2012	My Big Big Friend	Golias
2011–2013, 2016	Justin Time	Squidgy
2013	Republic of Doyle	Bruno
2013–2017	Camp Lakebottom	McGee
2013–2015	Grojband	Cameron Buttons
2013–2024	Paw Patrol	Jake
2014	Lost Girl	Harvey
2014–2019	Wishenpoof!	Bob
2015	Rookie Blue	Brent Stone
2015	Hemlock Grove	Norville Knox
2015	Murdoch Mysteries	Professor Aldous Lawrence
2015	Total Drama Presents: The Ridonculous Race	Jacques (26 episodes), Brody (20 episodes), Owen (17 episodes)
2015–2018	Inspector Gadget	Brain, Professor Slickstein
2018–2023	Total DramaRama	Owen
2018	Carter	Craig Rykart
2019	The Blacklist	Baldwin
2021	FBI	Don Kirkpatrick
2021	Jupiter's Legacy	John Ducarmont
2022	The Sinner	Verne Novak
2022–present	From	Victor
2023	Thomas & Friends: All Engines Go	Salty the Dockyard Diesel (US)

=== Film ===
Year	Title	Role	Notes
2000	Common Ground	Gus	
2000	Jailbait	Chuck Clopperman	TV movie
2000	The Other Me	Victor	TV movie
2001	The Santa Claus Brothers	Busby	TV movie
2002	Martin and Lewis	Abby Greshler	TV movie
2004	Care Bears: Journey to Joke-a-lot	Bedtime Bear	
2005	The Care Bears' Big Wish Movie	Bedtime Bear	
2005	Love Is Work	Shaun	
2006	16 Blocks	Lt. Kincaid	
2007	Shoot 'Em Up	Killer Shot in Behind	
2014	The Nut Job	Police Officer, Misc Animals	
2017	Blood Honey	Joe Bananali	
2019	Trust Me	Lawrence Highland	
2019	Sleeping Beauty	James	
2022	Charlotte	Manfred	
2022	East of Middle West	Bill	
2025	Thomas & Friends: Sodor Sings Together	Salty the Dockyard Diesel	US dub

=== Video games ===
Year	Title	Role
2009	Bakugan Battle Brawlers	Dan, Leonidas
