= Jerry Franck =

Luxembourg-born filmmaker

Jerry Franck is a Luxembourgish/American filmmaker best known for producing the documentary Chau, Beyond the Lines for which he received an Academy Award for Best Documentary (Short Subject) nomination at the 88th Academy Awards, with Courtney Marsh. Franck also produced ZARI (2014), The Tulip Chair (2015), Where Did the Adults Go? (2025), and is the director of the documentary feature film Bottle Conditioned (2023).

== Filmography ==
Year	Title	Producer	Director	Notes
2014	The Tulip Chair	Yes	No	
2014	ZARI	Yes	No	
2015	Chau, Beyond the Lines	Yes	No	
2023	Bottle Conditioned	Yes	Yes	Also co-writer, editor
2025	Where Did the Adults Go?	Yes	No	
