= Chau, Beyond the Lines =

- Film poster
- Directed by: Courtney Marsh
- Written by: Courtney Marsh; Marcelo Mitnik
- Produced by: Jerry Franck; Courtney Marsh
- Starring: Le Minh Chau
- Cinematography: Courtney Marsh
- Edited by: Courtney Marsh
- Music by: Steve London
- Production company: Cynasty Films
- Distributed by: Seventh Art Releasing
- Release dates: February 8, 2015 (Big Sky Documentary Film Festival); August 21, 2015
- Running time: 34 minutes
- Countries: United States; Vietnam
- Language: Vietnamese

Chau, Beyond the Lines (previously known as: War Within the Walls) is a 2015 American short-documentary film about a 16-year-old disabled by the effects of Agent Orange, who aspires to become an artist and clothing designer. It is directed by Courtney Marsh and produced by Jerry Franck and Marsh.

Chau, Beyond the Lines was shortlisted with nine other documentaries from 74 entries submitted to 88th Academy Awards in Documentary Short Subject category, and eventually received a nomination.

== Background ==
The documentary shows the lasting effects of Agent Orange, a chemical sprayed over the Vietnam jungles during the Vietnam War by the United States to deprive the Northern Vietnamese Army of their food and cover. After 20 years of war, Chau, a teenager living in a care center, is disabled by the effects of this chemical. With a rare disability in his arms and legs, Chau is repeatedly told that his dream of becoming a professional artist is impossible. Filming extended over 8 years.

== Awards ==
- 2015: Austin Film Festival – Grand Jury Award – Best Documentary Short Film
- 2015: USA Film Festival – National Jury Award – Documentary Short Film
- 2015: Fort Lauderdale International Film Festival – Grand Jury Award – Best Documentary Short Film
- 2016: Irvine International Film Festival - Grand Jury Award - Best Documentary Short Film
- 2016: Academy Awards – Nomination – Best Documentary – Short Subject.
