= Where Did the Adults Go? =

2025 drama film

- Film poster
- Directed by: Courtney Marsh
- Written by: Courtney Marsh
- Produced by: Jerry Franck
- Starring: Carey Cox; Amadeus Serafini; Carson MacCormac
- Production companies: Black Phoebe Films; The Group Entertainment
- Release date: October 9, 2025
- Running time: 89 minutes
- Country: United States
- Language: English

Where Did the Adults Go? is a 2025 psychological drama film written and directed by Courtney Marsh, starring Carey Cox, Amadeus Serafini, and Carson MacCormac.

== Premise ==
Three siblings – Cynthia, Bryce, and Miles – reunite on the anniversary of their parents' death. Cynthia proposes to sell their parents' home, angering Bryce and stirring up long-held resentments.

== Cast ==
- Carey Cox as Cynthia
- Amadeus Serafini as Bryce
- Carson MacCormac as Miles
- Samantha Rose Baldwin as Gabby
- Joanna Nava Goldsmith as Makeila
- William Atherton as the Father
- D'Ann Connelly as the Mother

== Critical reception ==
On the review aggregator website Rotten Tomatoes, 82% of 11 critics' reviews are positive.

Bobby LePire of Film Threat gave the film a score of 8/10, calling it "a solid and dramatic glimpse into the lives of adult siblings still grieving", praising the tone as "carefully maintained" and the characterizations as "excellent". Alton Williams of Battle Royale With Cheese gave a positive review, stating that "Marsh delivers a compact, character‑driven drama" that examines "how grief, responsibility and inherited property collide, creating fractures that widen as long‑standing tensions resurface". Panos Kotzathanasis of Asian Movie Pulse praised the film's "persistent sense of tension".
