= Carson MacCormac =

Canadian actor (born 1999)

- Born: October 21, 1999 (age 27); Oakville, Ontario, Canada
- Years active: 2017–present

Carson MacCormac (born October 21, 1999) is a Canadian actor. He is known for his roles in the films Giant Little Ones (2018); Luckiest Girl Alive (2022); Shazam! (2019) and its sequel, Shazam! Fury of the Gods (2023); Clown in a Cornfield (2025); and in the TV series Every Year After (2026).

== Early life ==
Carson MacCormac grew up in Oakville, Ontario. Although he began taking acting courses in 2011, his passion as a teenager was for baseball. He played for the Oakville A's, a youth league team run by the Oakville Minor Baseball Association. Carson began acting professionally in about 2016, and in 2017 was a provincial finalist in Senior Music Theatre – Group B of the Ontario Music Festivals Association.

== Career ==
MacCormac made his professional and television acting debut on April 10, 2017, in the episode "You Don't Understand Me at All" of the CBC Television series Bellevue. He made his motion picture debut a few weeks later in the 2017 short film Cold Hands, where he played Lucas, a teenage boy coming to terms with his sexual assault.

Carson made his feature film debut in the independent drama Giant Little Ones in September 2018, where he played a bullied teenager named Michael. He later appeared in the Lifetime cable network film Zombie at 17 and in eight episodes of the TVO Kids television series Big Top Academy.

MacCormac appears as Brett Bryer in the 2019 superhero film Shazam!, and its 2023 sequel, Shazam! Fury of the Gods. He has also appeared in the 2019 dystopian science fiction film Riot Girls, and makes appearances in the 2020 Netflix original horror series, October Faction and in the second season of the Netflix series Locke & Key as Benjamin Locke in 2021. In 2025, he starred in the horror film Clown in a Cornfield.

== Filmography ==
=== Film ===
Year	Title	Role	Notes
2017	Cold Hands	Lucas	Short film
2018	Giant Little Ones	Michael	
2019	Shazam!	Brett Breyer	
2019	Riot Girls	Spit	
2020	East of Middle West	Chris	
2022	Luckiest Girl Alive	Young Dean Barton	
2023	Shazam! Fury of the Gods	Brett Breyer	
2025	Clown in a Cornfield	Cole Hill	
2025	Where Did the Adults Go?	Miles	
2025	This Is Not a Test	Trace Casper	

=== Television ===
Year	Title	Role	Notes
2017	Bellevue	Young Adam Ryder	Episode: "You Don't Understand Me at All"
2018	Zombie at 17	Connor Foster	TV film
2018–2019	Big Top Academy	Young Nicky Zolta	8 episodes
2020	October Faction	Rob	Guest role; 3 episodes
2021–2022	Locke & Key	Benjamin Locke	Guest role; 3 episodes (seasons 2–3)
2022	Astrid & Lilly Save the World	Trystan Howell	Episode: "Lips"
2024	My Son's Deception	Tyler	TV film
2025	My Life with the Walter Boys	Zach	Recurring role (season 2)
2026	Every Year After	Young Charlie	Guest role; 3 episodes
