= Bakugan Battle Brawlers season 1 =

Bakugan Battle Brawlers
- Season 1
- Japanese DVD cover of 'protons volume 13 featuring the main characters (from top left to bottom right): Shun, Alice, Julie, Runo, Dan, and Marucho.
- No. of episodes: 52

Release
- Original network: TV Tokyo (Japan); Teletoon (Canada); Cartoon Network (U.S)
- Original release: April 5, 2007 – March 27, 2008

Season chronology
- Next → Battle Brawlers: New Vestroia

Bakugan Battle Brawlers (爆丸バトルブローラーズ, Bakugan Batoru Burōrāzu) is the first season of the 2007 Japanese action adventure anime television series Bakugan Battle Brawlers based on the strategic game called Bakugan developed by Sega Toys and Spin Master. The season was produced by TMS Entertainment and Japan Vistec under the direction of Mitsuo Hashimoto. The story centers on the lives of creatures called Bakugan and the battle brawlers who possess them.

The season first premiered in Japan on TV Tokyo on April 5, 2007, and was rebroadcast six days later on BS Japan. Nelvana Enterprises produced an English version which aired on the Canadian television network Teletoon on July 8, 2007. Cartoon Network, an American television station also premiered the season on February 24, 2008. The season was followed by a second season, Bakugan Battle Brawlers: New Vestroia, in 2009.

Four pieces of theme music are used for the season; two opening themes by Psychic Lover and two closing themes. Thirteen DVD compilations of four episodes each were released by Sega in Japan. The first compilation was released on July 25, 2007 with the thirteenth compilation released on July 25, 2008. In North America, eight DVD compilations were released by Nelvana in Canada and Warner Home Video in the United States. For the U.S. release, Volumes 1 and 6 contained 5 episodes each, volumes 2 through 5 each had 4 episodes, and the seventh and eighth volumes, titled Chapter 1 and 2, each had 13 episodes. The first compilation was released on August 26, 2008 with the eighth compilation released on July 6, 2010.

== Episode list ==
No.	English Title Japanese title	Japanese air date	English air date
1	"Bakugan: The Battle Begins"; Transliteration: "Dragon Warriors" (Japanese: 龍の戦士)	April 5, 2007	July 8, 2007 (Canada); February 24, 2008 (USA)
The battle begins when the story of how the game of Bakugan was created with the help of Dan and many other children, and how it quickly became popular around the world. Dan faces a young boy, Akira's older brother, Shuji, as Pyrus Dragonoid and a mysterious white dragon known as Naga fight in Vestroia, with the dragon destroying itself by getting to close to the two cores - Silent and Infinity -of Vestroia. Dan quickly beats his opponent, but in a rematch, things are far more heated. Dragonoid and a Darkus Bakugan called Fear Ripper fight it out, with Dan watching them. Their fight gets interrupted as Dragonoid's fight gets in the way, and Dan then gets Dragonoid in the fight and gives him his name.
2	"Masquerade Ball"; Transliteration: "The Man Who Summoned A Storm" (Japanese: 嵐を呼ぶ男)	April 12, 2007	July 15, 2007 (Canada); February 24, 2008 (USA)
Dan goes to school and attempts to show that Drago can talk, but only ends up getting in trouble. Drago tries to get away in the panic, but gets caught by the teacher. When Dan gets back, he is told by Runo that she lost a battle to Masquerade and lost her Bakugan because he took them. The others talk about the mysterious new Darkus brawler as Dan decides he will fight him. Shuji comes back for another rematch and loses. Masquerade comes and they start the fight, but it is not even a challenge for him as he quickly dispatches Dan with the "Doom card" that stops all abilities.
3	"A Feud Between Friends"; Transliteration: "Do As You Like" (Japanese: 勝手にしやがれ)	April 19, 2007	July 22, 2007 (Canada); March 7, 2008 (USA)
Masquerade shows up and gives the Doom card to a mysterious brawler, as Dan trains with Drago to fight him again, although Drago and Dan continue to argue and fight. Marucho speculates that the fight he had before was a draw, with the field self-destructing because of Drago's ability. They start to get along as Runo finds Haos Tigrera, another talking Bakugan. Dan then fights the mysterious brawler named Rikimaru. Dan barely beats him thanks to Drago's ingenious strategy. They argue about the outcome, and Dan then throws Drago into the river.
4	"Dan and Drago"; Transliteration: "Red Bonds" (Japanese: 赤い絆)	April 26, 2007	July 29, 2007 (Canada); March 15, 2008 (USA)
Dan tells the others about Drago and gets frustrated about how they do not agree with him. Dan then miserably goes through his day, blaming his misfortune on Drago. Ryo, a boy in his class, shows him strategies then Masquerade gives Ryo a Doom card and tells him to get revenge on Dan. Dan loses the fight and realizes his mistake in only focusing on the winning and power in Bakugan. Drago then realizes his own mistakes in being hard on Dan. Dan then heads out and manages to get Drago out of the river, both apologizing to each other. They then decide to put their differences aside and work together as a real team.
5	"Runo Rules"; Transliteration: "Hate But Love" (Japanese: 憎いあンちくしょう)	May 3, 2007	August 5, 2007 (Canada); March 22, 2008 (USA)
Dan talks with his friends until his mother yells at him because she needs him to run an errand. Meanwhile, Masquerade challenges a bully named Tatsuya and easily beats him with his Doom card. Dan and Runo finally meet each other after running into one another, but when Dan runs off, Runo finds his BakuPod on the ground with a message from Masquerade challenging him. Runo then decides to battle him in place of Dan, but instead gets to fight Tatsuya. Dan finds them and still allows Runo to fight in his place. Runo manages to beat him with Tigrerra's help.
6	"A Combination Battle"; Transliteration: "Tiger & Dragon" (Japanese: タイガー&ドラゴン)	May 10, 2007	August 12, 2007 (Canada); March 29, 2008 (USA)
Dan and Runo argue about what rides they should go on as they are suddenly interrupted by twins named Kenta and Kenji performing a magic show. They get tricked to go on stage, then learn that the whole thing was set up by Masquerade. They then begin a combination battle, but Runo and Dan cannot quite work together. Runo manages to pull out a winning strategy with her ability cards and gives Dan and Drago the upper hand in the final part of the battle. They are then able to see through the twins' plan and manage to pull out the win.
7	"Bakugan Idol"; Transliteration: "Chameleon Army" (Japanese: カメレオンアーミー)	May 17, 2007	August 19, 2007 (Canada); April 5, 2008 (USA)
A strange talking Bakugan jumps on a bird in the beginning of the episode as Dan and Runo talk to the others about some odd construction going on in town. It turns out that this place is Marucho's house, and he is finally moved into Dan's town. After Julie gets jealous that she was not invited to Marucho's home, Runo claims she forgot. Dan takes this opportunity to tease her and call her a scatterbrain. As a result, Marucho watches them bicker with each other. He starts giving them a tour of the huge mansion when they run into the mysterious Bakugan, whose name is Preyas. In the meantime, Masquerade is back again and gives the pop idols Jenny and Jewels Doom cards. They then crash Marucho's party and challenge Dan and Marucho to a combination battle. Preyas manages to pull out a few tricks and set the battle in their favor.
8	"Girls Just Wanna Have Fun"; Transliteration: "Be Silent" (Japanese: 美·サイレント)	May 24, 2007	August 26, 2007 (Canada); April 12, 2008 (USA)
The battle continues with Marucho barely managing to win with the pop idols element combination working against him. Just as things look bad for Drago, Preyas once again manages to help with his element change ability, winning the battle. After the battle, Drago explains his situation with his home world of Vestroia, and about the beginning episode with his fight with Naga the rouge Bakugan who was directly responsible for the collapse of Vestroia into chaos. In the very center of Vestroia are the Silent Core and the Infinity Core, which control the equilibrium of their dimension. But when Naga attempted to take control of the infinitely limitless power, he had released all of the Silent Core's negative energy into Vestroia, affecting many Bakugan and also spilling onto Earth. Drago then explains how Naga found a way into the very center of Vestroia by the help of a human, who inadvertently entered Vestroia on his own. He then explains his ultimate goal: Return both the Infinity Core and the Silent Core to their rightful place in Vestroia before it disintegrates into nothingness.
9	"Fight Or Flight!"; Transliteration: "In the Name of Love" (Japanese: 愛という名のもとに)	May 31, 2007	September 2, 2007 (Canada); April 19, 2008 (USA)
Miu and her friends Takashi and Kosuke wait at the airport for her little brother Makoto whom has not come home in a very long time, then Masquerade comes and gives the boys Doom cards. Alice comes to be with the group, arriving from Moscow by a plane. She feels apprehensive about telling them her visions involving her grandfather Michael, but just as they really get to know each other they get challenged by the two brothers. Since Dan is lost in the airport, Runo and Marucho battle for him. The brothers believe that by beating these two their wish of Miu seeing her little brother again will come true. They use a new trick called a Battlesham and take out one of Marucho's Bakugan, but in the end Marucho and Runo pull out the win after hearing Miu's pleas to stop fighting.
10	"A Perfect Match"; Transliteration: "Looking at the Same Moon" (Japanese: 同じ月を見ていた)	June 7, 2007	September 9, 2007 (Canada); April 26, 2008 (USA)
Julie loses a battle to her childhood friend Billy and becomes sad that she does not have her own talking Bakugan, although she does not admit it to her friends. After hearing that Billy found his in Bakugan Valley, she decides to head there to search for her own. She goes around the valley but comes home frustrated that she cannot find her own Bakugan. She finds one in her room after admitting to herself that she was lonely and wanted a friend. The Subterra Bakugan's name is Gorem and together they re-challenge Billy. Although the beginning is rocky, when the truly massive Gorem and Julie work together in the end they beat Cycloid and Billy.
11	"Grandpa's Got A Brand New Bakugan"; Transliteration: "The Boy in the Wind" (Japanese: 風の中の少年)	June 14, 2007	September 16, 2007 (Canada); May 3, 2008 (USA)
Episode starts out with Dan battling one of Masquerade's minions. He wins but then passes out. When Dan wakes up, Marucho proposes that they need all six attributes. He then says they should get Shun, the No. 1 Bakugan player in the world, on their team, because he has Ventus Bakugan. Runo agrees but Dan is against it. However, Runo and Marucho go to see Shun anyway. They enter his home, only to run into traps and eventually Shun's grandfather. Shun's grandfather attempts to attack them but Runo and Marucho accidentally pull out their Battle Cards and stop time. They walk past him and restart time making him fall into his own trap. Runo and Marucho then hear Shun playing on his Leaf Whistle and find him. They ask him to join, but he refuses. Skyress then comes and asks Shun if this is what he really wants. Right before Runo and Marucho leave, Shun challenges them to a battle. Runo and Marucho argue over who will take him on, and he states he will fight them both. He says he will join, but only if they win. Runo does not think he will stand a chance, and the battle starts. Runo and Marucho both think of a few plans which fail. Shun then uses "Winds of Fury" which take out some of their Bakugan. But Preyas and Tigrerra both come out onto the field and leave Shun with just Skyress. Runo and Marucho think that they have won but Shun takes both of them out, winning the battle.
12	"Bakugan Stall"; Transliteration: "Time, Stop" (Japanese: 時間よ止まれ)	June 21, 2007	September 23, 2007 (Canada); May 10, 2008 (USA)
Alice is working at Runo's family's restaurant, and all of the guys seem to have a thing for her. Alice is worried about telling Runo about her grandfather being Hal-G, the human who corrupted Naga's mind. Runo is still troubled about losing to Shun, and breaks a cup when Alice comes in, making Alice unable to tell her about her grandfather. Skyress asks Shun if he is all right, to which he responds, "I don't know". Dan is looking up his ranking, now at 97, and is shocked to see that Runo is nearby as well. He then sees that Shun is in 6th place, and shows that he is unsatisfied. Drago asks about Shun, and Dan tells him that he was at the Top, but then stopped playing Bakugan. Dan then tells Drago how he and Shun used to be best friends when they were little. He says that he and Shun were the ones who started the game of Bakugan, and that Shun started to come onto the chat site less and less. Shun then has a flashback about him sitting by his ill mother at the hospital, and she asks him to go get her purse. She says that there is something inside of it for him, but he says he does not need anything, all he wants is for her to get better. While Shun is walking to his house he wishes that she would stop worrying over him and look after herself. He gets home and sees that his grandfather left him a message stating that "things are gonna change under my house rules." Shun runs off really angry at his grandfather. His grandfather wants him to stop playing Bakugan and become a "true warrior", a Ninja. Suddenly Dan and Shun are having a Bakugan Battle. The battle goes on and Dan notices how Shun is going easy on him. Dan becomes aggravated and asks what is wrong. Shun tells him that the battle must continue, and he does not ever want to stop. But because of this he starts to cry and his vision gets blurry, making him throw his Bakugan onto the wrong card. This makes Dan win, and soon they find Dan's father and takes Shun to the hospital. He runs into the room and his mother gives him Skyress. Then she goes into a coma (in the English version; but in the Japanese version she dies). Shun's grandfather states that he will never be able to Bakugan Brawl again and that he will be training to become a ninja.
13	"Just For The Shun Of It"; Transliteration: "The Storm of Passion" (Japanese: 情熱の嵐)	June 28, 2007	September 30, 2007 (Canada); May 17, 2008 (USA)
While everyone is at Runo's cafe Dan learns from Preyas that Runo and Marucho went to see Shun, and that they battled him but lost. Dan becomes furious that Runo and Marucho did that. When Marucho and Runo go back to see Shun, Dan comes with them. When they get there Dan jumps over the wall, while Marucho and Runo warn him not to. When Dan does not fall into a booby trap Runo and Marucho follow him but they end up landing in a booby trap. Meanwhile, Dan finds Shun but discovers that he is with Masquerade. A three-way brawl soon gets underway between Dan, Shun and Masquerade. Dan and Shun meet Masquerade's partner Darkus Bakugan Hydranoid for the first time and discover he has a power level higher than any other Bakugan. In the end, Shun comes out as the winner and finally agrees to rejoin the Battle Brawlers, while mending his friendship with Dan at the same time.
14	"The Story Of Vestroia"; Transliteration: "A Midsummer Night's Dream" (Japanese: 真夏の夜の夢)	July 5, 2007	October 7, 2007 (Canada); May 24, 2008 (USA)
Alice finally reveals to the other Brawlers that her grandfather Michael is the one that Naga encountered in Vestroia. When the other Brawlers learn of this they all decide to take a road trip to her grandfather's lab in Moscow to see if they can find learn anything else. When all the Brawlers, minus Julie, get there they find a video recording from Dr. Michael that explains how Bakugan entered the human world and how he was involved in that. Meanwhile all the top brawlers from around the world are invited to a party including the #2 battler Klaus von Herzon, #3 battler Chan Lee, #4 battler Julio Santana, #5 battler Komba O'Charlie and #10 battler Billy Gilbert. They decide to have a battle royale and while in the middle of it Masquerade interrupts and drags them all to Vestroia where they were hypnotized by Naga into doing his bidding. In the end the Brawlers decide to head to Julie's hometown which is also home to the Bakugan Valley in hopes that it will lead them to a doorway that leads them to Vestroia. As the Brawlers fly off they are watched from the shadows by the brainwashed battlers.
15	"Duel in the Desert"; Transliteration: "Ha. As GOOD" (Japanese: ハッとして!Good)	July 12, 2007	October 14, 2007 (Canada); May 31, 2008 (USA)
Dan and the brawlers arrive at Bakugan Valley and meet up with Julie and Gorem. Once there the brawlers begin their search for the infinity core and a door to Vestroia, after being chased by bats and scorpions through a cave Dan and the others find behind a door, a path to Vestroia. Through the power of their Bakugan Dan, Shun, Marucho, Runo and Julie are shown what Vestroia's current state is as well as their respective bakugan's attributed homeworld. After fleeing from the cave which began to collapse on them, they encounter Billy and Komba who challenge the brawlers to a battle. Shun and Julie accept and the battle begins, with the brawlers learning that Billy and Komba work for Masquerade. The battle becomes intense as both Julie and Shun lose Bakugan leaving them with only Gorem and Skyress, after defeating Billy's Cycloid and Komba's Harpus the battle finally ends with the brawlers winning. Although Julie tries to snap Billy out of the hypnosis, he and Komba remain under Naga's control while vowing to take the Brawler's partner Bakugan. The episode ends with Julie crying over Billy's actions.
16	"No Guts No Glory"; Transliteration: "It's Guts!!" (Japanese: ガッツだぜ!!)	July 19, 2007	October 21, 2007 (Canada); June 7, 2008 (USA)
The brawlers have settled down to eat dinner but no one except Dan seems to have an appetite as they are concerned about Julie who returned home depressed after the battle. The next day the brawlers are searching for another entrance to Vestroia without any luck. Dan suggests they go visit Julie but Alice says she probably needs to be alone right now, before the discussion can continue Shun contacts Dan saying that he has discovered another region with physical similarities as Bakugan Valley suggesting they go there to look for a door to Vestroia. Dan and the others agree to this plan and cut off communication. While Shun and Skyress wait, Skyress looks at the two maps Shun has on the computer and comments how the two valley's look nothing alike, asking herself what Shun is up to. When the brawlers return to the plane they are greeted by Julie, who has perked up and decided to move on from being depressed. With Julie joining them the brawlers take off for the other valley. While on their way there the brawlers comment on how Masquerade and his team keep showing up wherever they go and Shun states that someone must be spying for him. When Dan accuses Shun of saying that one of the brawlers is the spy, Shun denies that by saying there is one other person who knows the brawlers every move, that person being Webmaster Joe. The brawlers consider this a possibility and Skyress states that this must be the reason why Shun lied about the valley that they were heading to. The brawlers realize that if Masquerade's team is at the valley then Webmaster Joe is most likely involved with him. Once they arrive they are greeted by Chan and a battle between her and Dan begins. Dan and Drago test their luck as they take out two of Chan's Bakugan only for the tides to turn when Chan revives them and Dan is left with only Drago. Things go from bad to worse as Chan's Bakugan has a much stronger power-level than Drago just as Chan goes in for the killing blow, Drago turns around and takes Chan's Bakugan out with both Dan and Chan learning that Drago's power level increased without Dan using an ability card. Dan discovers when Drago returns to ball form that Drago's body is burning up like crazy then it suddenly cools off. Dan and Drago end the battle by using a fusion move against Chan's Fourtress. The episode ends with Dan's friends celebrating his victory over Chan while Chan herself silently congratulates Dan from a far but saying that he will not win their next battle. Dan and his friends all come to the agreement that Webmaster Joe must be working for Masquerade. Meanwhile a boy, whose face is not shown is commenting on how it is time he checks up on what the Bakugan Battle Brawlers are doing.
17	"BFF Best Friends Forever"; Transliteration: "With You Forever" (Japanese: 君といつまでも)	July 26, 2007	October 28, 2007 (Canada); June 14, 2008 (USA)
Everything begins with Klaus looking up Preyas's data saying how he does not possess a Bakugan like him and how he would like to add it to his seemingly extensive Bakugan collection. It then switches to the brawlers as they return to Marucho's plane as another day of searching for the infinity core and a door to Vestroia ends in failure. Marucho and Preyas cheer everyone up by making takoyaki to eat. Dan later suggests that they ask for information about the infinity core on their website while everyone disagrees, Shun agrees with Dan saying that even if they keep their search a secret info on it can still be leaked so they should go on the offensive and stick their necks out to see what happens. With all the brawlers and bakugan in agreement Marucho uploads Dan's video on the website which Klaus receives. In the morning the brawlers receive a message stating that if they want info on the infinity core then go to Germany. Once there they meet Klaus who reveals that he lied to them to get them to come here where he will take Preyas and that he works for Masquerade. Marucho and Preyas take on Klaus and his Sirenoid. The battle does not go so well and in the end Preyas is sent to the Doom Dimension!
18	"Evolution Revolution"; Transliteration: "Flash!" (Japanese: フラッシュ!)	August 2, 2007	November 4, 2007 (Canada); June 21, 2008 (USA)
After losing Preyas to Klaus, Marucho, who is grief-stricken, begs Klaus to return him but Klaus refuses. Klaus opens a portal to Masquerade's evil lair which Marucho and Runo both jump through after Klaus. When there they access Masquerade's computer and learn about the wonders of Bakugan evolution and its intense power. Just when they thought it could not get any stranger: Julio! The 4th ranked brawler shows up and challenges them to a battle. Surprisingly, Dan opens his Gate Card at the same time as Runo, Marucho and Julio and is dragged into the battle. Julio insists they both take him and his Haos Tentaclear on. The battle gets intense and once again Drago's power level goes up without Dan's assistance at all. The battle ends with Dan and Runo winning and Runo and Marucho return with Dan to the other brawlers. The brawlers comment on how Masquerade is still on his quest to find the ultimate Bakugan. Drago states that if the silent core has fused with the ultimate bakugan Naga then it is possible for the infinity core to do the same, with Julie worrying that that Bakugan could be Hydranoid. With that in mind the brawlers are determined to make sure that one of their Bakugan becomes the ultimate Bakugan before Hydranoid.
19	"Julie Plays Hard Brawl"; Transliteration: "Memories Falling" (Japanese: 想い出ぼろぼろ)	August 9, 2007	November 11, 2007 (Canada); June 28, 2008 (USA)
The episode starts with Marucho and Preyas playing together at the beach when Preyas suddenly disappears. Marucho wakes up to find out that that was all a dream and Preyas is still gone. At breakfast Dan and Runo get in another fight that causes a rift in the brawlers. Julie wants to free Billy from Masquerade's control while Runo wants to help Marucho. Dan and Julie leave to go searching for Billy with Julie coming up with an idea for how to find him. Meanwhile, Runo is steaming because Dan does not act like he wants to help Marucho but she is reminded by Shun that Dan and Drago were once separated too. Dan and Julie have arrived in Germany where Julie remembers that Billy once wanted to visit. As soon as they arrive they are confronted by Billy and a battle begins between him and Julie. The battle goes back and force until Gorem and Julie are about to be sent to the Doom Dimension. With help from the toy Billy gave Julie when they were small Billy fights Masquerade's control and deactivates the Doom Card in time to save Julie and Gorem. Although Julie lost the battle she managed to save Billy from Masquerade's mind control.
20	"A Little Help From My Friends"; Transliteration: "Tomorrow's Wind Will Blow Tomorrow" (Japanese: 明日は明日の風が吹く)	August 16, 2007	November 18, 2007 (Canada); July 12, 2008 (USA)
The episode starts with the brawlers realizing that Naga has not yet reached the level of Ultimate Evolution as he is still trapped within the Silent Core. Billy also tells them that Masquerade had shown him, Klaus, Chan, Julio, and Komba Naga who used the negative energy to brainwash them. Shun remains quiet throughout this and later leaves the team as he feels none of them will be able to beat Masquerade — Dan and Runo always quarrel, Marucho moans over the loss of Preyas. Alice goes after Shun to help him realize that he cannot face all battles alone and requires the support and help of his friends. Initially Shun does not agree with her, but then seeing Komba acting so tough made him realize that Alice was right. After Shun's victory over Komba, Dan comes running to Shun and Alice, begging Shun to rejoin the team. Shun complies and the episode ends with Komba pleading Shun to be his teacher in ninjutsu.
21	"My Good Friend"; Transliteration: "We're Good Friends" (Japanese: 我が良き友よ)	August 23, 2007	November 25, 2007 (Canada); July 19, 2008 (USA)
The Bakugan Team bring Komba back home to Kenya, and soon after Marucho, Dan and Runo are challenged to a Bakugan Brawl against Klaus, Chan and Julio. Shun, Alice and Julie are worried that they will not win as they are not working together as a team. Once on the battlefield Marucho says he wants to battle Klaus as revenge, but instead Runo battles Klaus, and he reveals his "new" Bakugan Preyas, they win and Runo loses her Bakugan. Marucho gets emotional at the prospect that Preyas will not sent to the doom dimension and now is on the bad side. Marucho loses two of his Bakugan, and Dan and Runo start to argue, which causes them to see sense from Tigrerra's words, explaining that a defeat can give a Bakugan amnesia. They work together to use an ability card to bring Preyas back to Marucho. Marucho starts crying and the episode ends with Marucho saying "The battle has just begun".
22	"Drago's on Fire!"; Transliteration: "The Sun Will Rise Again" (Japanese: 陽はまた昇る)	August 30, 2007	December 2, 2007 (Canada); July 26, 2008 (USA)
Preyas is back and is better than ever! With Preyas on their side of the battle things are looking up for the battle brawlers. Dan, Runo, and Marucho are able to take down the remainder of Klaus, Chan and Julio's Bakugan until only Sirenoid, Fourtress and Tentaclear remain. Things take a turn for the worse however when Chan uses the quartet battle gate card to force Drago to take on all three bakugan at once. With help from Runo and Tigrerra, and Marucho and Preyas, and Dan Drago causes cracks in the field that release lava that encircles Drago and transforms into a meteor. As everyone watches amazed with what is happening a change begins to occur to Drago within the meteor. Drago soon breaks through the meteor revealing that he has evolved and become Pyrus Delta Dragonoid. With Drago's newly evolved Pyrus abilities the battle ends in victory for the battle brawlers. The celebrations continue as Klaus returns Preyas to Marucho saying they deserve to be together. The episode ends with Chan telling the brawlers that Joe is a sickly and frail teenager who lives in a hospital.
23	"Say It Ain't So Joe"; Transliteration: "The Shy One" (Japanese: 内気なあいつ)	September 6, 2007	December 9, 2007 (Canada); August 2, 2008 (USA)
The team go to a city where Webmaster Joe is staying in a hospital. They enter the hospital and ask the receptionist where Webmaster Joe's room is and she tells them 'Room 501'. Then Dan goes looking for him, losing the others but cannot find the room Joe is in and ends up the others decide to go and see Joe on their own. Runo knocks on the door and a lady says 'Come in' and they do. She introduces herself as Joe's mother while talking about him and bringing out freshly baked cookies. Julie tries one and has some more as she loves them so much. The team and Joe's mother wait for him. Instead, Dan finally finds Joe and they go up on the roof so then Dan challenges Joe to battle to find out if he is working for Masquerade. Amazed, Joe stands around in the Bakugan Field since it is his first time ever. Dan very shocked that he has never played before, carries on. But in between the battle, Joe collapses and is taken to a room where the team and Joe's mother are waiting for him to wake up. Finally, he does and tells the team he had a dream about a Bakugan called Wavern who is Naga's twin sister and the current owner of the Infinity Core. She tells him not to let Naga get his greedy claws on the mighty Infinity Core or all of Vestroia will be destroyed. After that the others think about that and Dan welcomes Joe to the Bakugan Battle Brawlers team and everyone is happy.
24	"The Secret of Success"; Transliteration: "The Younger Boy" (Japanese: 年下の男の子)	September 13, 2007	December 14, 2007 (Canada); August 9, 2008 (USA)
It starts with a young boy who is losing a Bakugan battle to a teenager, then it switches to Dan's parents wondering where Dan is and when he will be home. Just as their conversation stops the ground begins to shake and when they go outside they see Marucho's plane with Dan yelling 'I'm home!' Dan and Drago relax in a bathtub and discuss the events that have happened and what they need to do next. Meanwhile Julie decides to stay at Marucho's house and Shun has returned home to meditate. Runo is working in her parents' cafe while Alice is out buying groceries. Alice sees a young boy with Bakugan and tries to stop him from throwing them into the river, when Alice learns that Christopher, the boy, is being bullied into playing Bakugan where he always loses she offers to be his coach to help him beat the bully. Christopher takes him on with Alice at his side only for Alice to end up moving around while time is frozen. As Christopher struggles to win he remembers what Alice told him and believes in himself this allows Christopher to hear the voice of his guardian Bakugan Juggernoid. With the two of them working together Christopher comes out the victor. The episodes end with Dan remembering the most important thing to him, his pudding cup while Runo realizes that if Joe is not a spy for Masquerade, then one of the brawlers must be a spy.
25	"Trust Me!"; Transliteration: "The Ace of Hearts Won't Appear" (Japanese: ハートのエースが出てこない)	September 20, 2007	December 23, 2007 (Canada); August 16, 2008 (USA)
The brawlers are trying to find people to take them on in battle but no one wants to. Marucho and Julie return to Marucho's home while Dan visits Runo and Alice. While Runo is not around Alice tells Dan that she thinks Runo is suspicious of her and has been watching everything she does. When Dan talks to Runo about it Runo admits that she is suspicious of Alice because she does not have a partner Bakugan and she does not battle so why is she on the team. Runo thinks she may be working for Masquerade but Dan does not think so. Meanwhile Julie tells Marucho that she thinks Shun works for Masquerade because she saw Shun earlier. While Marucho searches their website for answers Julie goes searching for Shun. Meanwhile Alice is getting groceries and overhears Dan and Runo talking about her when Dan and Runo are confronted by Shuji, Akira and their younger sister Nene who want to battle. As the battle starts, Alice joins Dan and Runo at the last minute. While at the same time Julie confronts Shun who she finally finds with Shun's grandfather. Believing Shun's grandfather to be Hal-G Julie whacks him in the face and challenges Shun to a battle. Shun and Skyress are soon able to clear up the misunderstanding with Julie while Runo does not accept Alice's help until right before they are about to lose. Runo and Alice make up and become friends again, and together with Dan, they win their battle, while Marucho discovers that someone has hacked into the brawlers files and they know everything about the brawlers. The episode ends with Shun's grandfather meeting all of his best friends, while Marucho decides not to inform the others of what he discovered for the time being.
26	"Doom Dimension Or Bust"; Transliteration: "Sleep Like A Ballad" (Japanese: バラードのように眠れ)	September 27, 2007	December 30, 2007 (Canada); August 23, 2008 (USA)
The episode begins with the flashes of light indicating that a battle has just ended and Julio falls to the ground completely after he lost Tentaclear to the Doom Dimension beaten up from his battle against Masquerade who is seen walking away. Then it shows Runo who is worrying about the small amount of Bakugan she has left. It then switches over to Chan who engages Masquerade in a battle, the battle ends badly however as Chan loses and Fourtress is sent to the Doom Dimension. It switches back to Runo's cafe where Runo has just finished telling the brawlers that she is not going to battle ever again with Tigrerra asking her later on if that is a good idea. It then switches over to Komba who is in the middle of a battle against Masquerade, Komba loses and Harpus is sent to the Doom Dimension. Later Masquerade challenges Billy and wins sending Cycloid to the Doom Dimension, Julie senses something is wrong when Billy's toy horse suddenly falls over. Meanwhile Runo contemplates her decision to quit Bakugan when Dan and Drago show up trying to cheer her up, also saying that they will cover for her and Tigrerra if she's serious. Meanwhile during his battle with Klaus Masquerade's Hydranoid evolves to Darkus Dual Hydranoid, this Hydranoid now has two heads and even more power than the old Hydranoid. Although Sirenoid plans to sacrifice herself using the Mind Ghost gate card to stop Masquerade's newly evolved Hydranoid. The plan fails and Klaus loses Sirenoid to the Doom Dimension. In the end, Runo decides to start playing Bakugan again as a Haos fighter.
27	"Show Down"; Transliteration: "Setting Sun" (Japanese: 落陽)	October 4, 2007	January 6, 2008 (Canada); August 30, 2008 (USA)
The brawlers learn that Masquerade has sent the Bakugan of his former teammates to the Doom Dimension and that Hydranoid has evolved to Dual Hydranoid. Masquerade and Dan have another brawl again. Everything is going well for Dan but just when Dan is about to win the battle Masquerade pulls out one last ability card and turns the tide. Unfortunately, Drago loses to Hydranoid and is sent to the Doom Dimension. Before the portal closes though, Dan jumps in after Drago with Shun trying to stop him. The battlefield disappears and the Brawlers look on in horror as they realize that they will never see Dan and Drago again.
28	"The Brawler's Last Stand"; Transliteration: "Chewing On My Lip" (Japanese: 唇をかみしめて)	October 11, 2007	January 13, 2008 (Canada); September 6, 2008 (USA)
The episode starts with six voices talking about how Vestroia is collapsing and how they sacrificed everything to save Vestroia in the past, and how now they need to find new warriors to save Vestroia. It is the morning after Dan and Drago were sent to the Doom Dimension and all of the Brawlers are taking it hard. In the Doom Dimension Drago is greeted by Reaper saying that now that Drago is there he will never get out, and Dan reunites with Drago. Meanwhile Dan's mother realizes that somethings up when the Brawlers lie to her saying that Dan went away to help a friend, and goes to Runo's family cafe to ask her about it. When Dan's mother confronts Runo about Dan's sudden departure and about how she caught Dan talking to his Bakugan one day Runo runs off saying she cannot tell her anything, leaving Dan's mother very worried. At the same time Shun receives a challenge letter from Masquerade and he and Skyress come up with a plan to find Dan and Drago. When Runo and Alice arrive at Marucho's home they tell everyone that Dan's mother knows that Dan has disappeared. Skyress and the other Bakugan sneak away to fight Masquerade on their own, stating that they have gotten the humans too involved in their battles. Alice realizes that Shun is hiding something from everyone she makes him tell them all. The brawlers reunite with their Bakugan and they all decide to go to the Doom Dimension together to find and rescue Dan and Drago. Each of the Brawlers say good-bye to their families before they head out to face Masquerade. Runo contacts Dan's mother and tells her not to worry because she will see Dan soon. Dan's mother chases Runo to the place where she sent the message from and arrives just in time to see the brawlers start their battle against Masquerade. As time stops for Dan's mother it is quickly restored and when she looks again Masquerade stands alone with no Brawlers in sight. She asks Masquerade where they went and he said they were all sent to the Doom Dimension. In the Doom Dimension the Brawlers begin their search for Dan, unaware that they have been observed. Six Bakugan, one from each attribute, look through a viewing sphere and give off different reactions to the Brawlers arrival in the Doom Dimension. In the end these six Bakugan decide to test the Brawlers.
29	"Nightmare in Doomsville"; Transliteration: "Me and Her Circumstances" (Japanese: 彼女と私の事情)	October 18, 2007	January 20, 2008 (Canada); September 13, 2008 (USA)
The brawlers reunite with Dan and Drago and as they are wondering how to get back home from the Doom Dimension the six Bakugan who were watching the brawlers appeared. The six Bakugan introduce themselves as Pyrus Apollonir, Haos Lars Lion, Aquos Frasch, Subterra Clayf, Ventus Oberus and Darkus Exceedra. Drago recognizes them as the six ancient warriors who saved Vestroia in the past. When the brawlers demand to know what the ancients what they explain that they are searching for new warriors to save Vestroia from total destruction. The ancients say that they want Dan and the brawlers to become the new warriors and that if they do the ancients will help them escape from the Doom Dimension. But there is a condition, the brawlers must face the ancient warrior of their attribute in battle...and win or else they will remain in the Doom Dimension forever. The brawlers agree but Dan adds to the stakes saying that if they win all of the Bakugan trapped in the Doom Dimension will be freed. The ancients agree then in a flash of light they separate the brawlers sending them in different directions with Julie and Gorem being the first to be tested. When Julie wakes up she finds herself in her house with her older sister Daisy and Tom, who is really Clayf. The battle begins with Julie facing off against Daisy, who has Clayf. Throughout the battle Julie is constantly being reminded of how her older sister was perfect and no matter how hard she tried she could never be as good as her. With help from Gorem who was on the brink of defeat from Clayf, Julie realizes that she had to stop comparing herself to Daisy and just be herself. Julie's return in confidence allows Gorem to evolve in Subterra Hammer Gorem, winning the battle against Clayf. With Clayf having lost the battle he makes Julie and Gorem the new Subterra soldiers.
30	"I am Marucho! Hear Me Roar!"; Transliteration: "For Me to Be Me" (Japanese: 僕が僕であるために)	October 25, 2007	January 27, 2008 (Canada); September 20, 2008 (USA)
The episode starts with Marucho getting sent somewhere for his test. Marucho walks around searching for the others but has no luck in finding them just then Marucho hears a voice. The voice asks him to move and Marucho looks down to see he is standing on a frog person. This strange being asks Marucho and Preyas to get him some water after Marucho and Preyas give him the water they learn that he is Frasch the ancient aquos soldier. Frosch transforms the surrounding area into water and starts the battle using an imitation of Marucho as his partner. As the battle goes on Marucho realizes that the Marucho he is facing is his past self, from the time when he did everything his parents asked of him. Marucho gets angry at this and realizes that his test must be to learn to accept his difficult past. Knowing this Marucho sends Preyas into battle Preyas wins the first one and is struggling in the second one. When Preyas tells Marucho that back in the past he did everything to make his parents said was because he wanted to make them happy Marucho realizes the truth for himself. Just then Preyas spits out a Bakugan ball that opens to reveal Aquos Preyas Angelo which leads to Marucho and Frasch giving off different reactions. Preyas reveals that his evolution involves multiplication and Angelo tells Marucho that although he may be an Aquos Bakugan he also has attributes of a Haos Bakugan. The battle resumes with the triple battle gate card activating for Preyas and Angelo. With Frosch's second Bakugan defeated Frosch steps in to battle the evolved Preyas. Frosch and Preyas appear on Marucho's gate card which is a triple battle card. Marucho activates the card and sends Angelo out to battle...only to meet Aquos Preyas Diablo instead! Preyas explains that Diablo is Angelo's alter-ego and that Angelo and Diablo are two bakugan in one. Diablo informs Marucho that he not only has Aquos attributes but Pyrus attributes as well. With Marucho having won the battle he makes peace with his past self and Frosch tells him he shall return him to his friends while calling them his new Aquos soldiers.
31	"A Place Far From Home"; Transliteration: "The Setting Sun Is Crying" (Japanese: 夕陽が泣いている)	November 1, 2007	February 3, 2008 (Canada); September 27, 2008 (USA)
Shun and Skyress finds themselves in a town. As they look around they notice that there is no one else is there and Skyress comments that it looks like a ghost town. Just then Shun and Skyress meet a little girl who is looking for someone to play with. When Shun asks what she wants to play she says tag and makes Shun it. Shun and Skyress play with her and when they win the little girl starts another game, kick the can. After that the little girl brings them to the hill and shows them the sun which makes Shun and Skyress realize that it has not moved since they got there. Just then Shun has a flashback from when he was little about his ill mother. The little girl then talks about how alone she was before Shun came and tells Shun she has one more game to play with him, Bakugan. The battle starts and Shun quickly takes the lead but begins to have difficulty after Oberus joins the battle. Skyress is defeated by Oberus just when Shun realizes his mistake of seeing the little girl as his mother because of their similar personalities. Shun's tear lands on Skyress's ability card and begins to change as Skyress evolves into Storm Skyress. Skyress defeats Oberus and Shun says goodbye to the little girl as the sun begins to set. Oberus brings Shun to Vestroia to show them what has happened and Skyress says that she can count on them. Oberus sends Shun and Skyress back to the other brawlers as the new Ventus soldiers.
32	"Play Nice, Runo!"; Transliteration: "The One On My Mind" (Japanese: 気になるあいつ)	November 8, 2007	February 10, 2008 (Canada); October 4, 2008 (USA)
The Battle Brawlers are dispersed into separate worlds created by the Six Legendary Soldiers of Vestroia. Julie, Marucho and Shun pass their test. Now it is time for Runo to pass her test. The Haos Legendary Soldier, Lars Lion, creates a mystical woodland area. Tigrerra and Runo find themselves wondering in a forest full of mist. Runo pleads and wishes that Dan would be here to guide them. Suddenly, a shadowy figure appears. Runo then has a flashback of when she was little with Dan. Then Lars Lion transforms into an old lady and awaits for Runo in a cave. Wondering where they are, the duo stumbles into an old lady. The lady suggests some directions, but Runo is creeped out by her looks and ponders deeper into the woods. After cluelessly strolling in the forest, Runo encounters a little boy. The little boy was in a hurry and steamed off to somewhere. Desperately needing directions, Runo and Tigrerra decide to chase after him. As the two were catching up to him, Runo has the strangest feeling that she has seen the little boy before. As Runo and Tigrerra reach the cottage that is presumed to be the little boy's house, she knocks on the door and out comes the little boy. The boy seems to remember Runo, although Runo does not. After a while, Runo has a slight flashback of her childhood. She remembers the first time and is then challenged by a little boy (Dan) from her past, that was created by the Lars Lion. The battle tests Runo and her partner Haos Tigrerra, but the real test is for her to admit that she treasures her friendship with the real Dan. Being stubborn, Runo will not admit anything to Lars Lion. When Tigrerra is being attacked, Runo is forced to admit that she really does treasure Dan, saying "We are friends forever, Dan!" By doing this Tigrerra evolves into Haos Blade Tigrerra (which frees herself from Runo's stubbornness) and defeats Lars Lion; thus passing their test and becoming the Haos soldiers.
33	"You're Going Down, Clown!"; Transliteration: "Who's That!" (Japanese: 誰だ!)	November 15, 2007	February 17, 2008 (Canada); October 11, 2008 (USA)
As the Brawlers are in the Doom Dimension, they are confronted by the Six Legendary Soldiers of Vestroia. Julie, Marucho, Shun and Runo all have passed their tests. As a reward, the Legendary Soldiers have granted the Brawler's Guardian Bakugan, an evolution; resulting in Gorem evolving into Hammer Gorem, Preyas spawning Angelo/Diablo Preyas, Skyress evolving into Storm Skyress, and Tigrerra evolving into Blade Tigrerra. Now it is Dan and Drago's turn to confront their test in order to free the Brawlers (as well as all the other Bakugan trapped) from the Doom Dimension. Dan and Drago battles Apollonir, the leader of the Legendary Soldiers of Vestroia. Even though they defeated Apollonir, Drago has not evolved like the others. Apollonir later explains that in order for Drago to evolve again, he will need to defeat the other four Brawlers. Although reluctant, Dan agrees to follow through with this second part of their test.
34	"Home Sweet Home"; Transliteration: "Light in the Darkness" (Japanese: 闇に光を)	November 22, 2007	February 24, 2008 (Canada); October 18, 2008 (USA)
Dan and the rest of the Brawlers return home back to Earth from the Doom Dimension, but Dan is unsure how to tell them that he did not pass his test yet or how he needs to battle all of them in order to do so. Meanwhile, Joe and Wavern are challenged by Masquerade, who wants the Infinity Core from Wavern. After Wavern single-handedly defeats Masquerade's Bakugan, including Dual Hydranoid, Joe manages to defeat Masquerade. Wavern tells Masquerade that if her evil twin brother, Naga, wants the Infinity Core that he will have to come for it himself. Masquerade tells her that he is not Naga's messager as he teleports away. Determined for a win, Masquerade prepares to travel to the Doom Dimension in order to find a way to evolve Dual Hydranoid into his ultimately evolved form, Alpha Hydranoid. Will he succeed or fail?
35	"Dan's Last Stand"; Transliteration: "Hot Hearts" (Japanese: 熱き心に)	November 29, 2007	March 2, 2008 (Canada); October 25, 2008 (USA)
Joe reveals that he and Wavern defeated Masquerade thanks to the vast positive energy and power of the Infinity Core. Drago and Wavern also reveal that they were in quite a strong and close romantic relationship in Vestroia. Dan and Drago reveal to the Shun, Marucho, Julie and their Bakugan that they did not pass their test. As the other brawlers demand why Dan explains that they beat Apollonir but he told them that Dan and Drago have to beat all of the brawler's Bakugan in order for Drago to evolve into the ultimate Bakugan. Julie and Gorem decide to take Dan on first. It is a grueling battle but Dan and Drago come out the victors. Next is Marucho vs Dan and Drago again the results are the same as Dan and Drago end up the victors. Dan goes to take Shun on next but Shun delays it to the next day as Dan and Drago are exhausted from battling Julie and Marucho.
36	"Show Me What You've Got!"; Transliteration: "Summer Snow" (Japanese: 夏に降る雪)	December 6, 2007	March 9, 2008 (Canada); November 1, 2008 (USA)
After Dan battles against his friends, Julie and Marucho. He battles Runo and Blade Tigrerra, so Delta Dragonoid can evolve to the next level, and become the Ultimate Bakugan. Masquerade goes to see Exedra, the Darkus Legendary Soldier of Vestroia, and ends up fighting an illusionary version of his alter-ego, Alice. Drago and Wavern meet up and discuss about their past, and why Naga became so evil and power hungry. Later, Dan and Drago defeat Runo and Tigrerra, making them one step closer towards Drago's second evolution.
37	"You Say You Want an Evolution!"; Transliteration: "Dangerous Couple" (Japanese: 危険なふたり)	December 13, 2007	March 16, 2008 (Canada); November 8, 2008 (USA)
It is the battle that everyone is looking forward to. The showdown between Dan and Drago vs. Shun and Skyress. As everyone gears up for the battle they wonder if Dan will really be able to beat Shun and what happens if they cannot? As Dan and Shun's battle is about to begin Joe and Wayvern join in to watch the battle, so with everyone assembled the battle begins. Meanwhile Christopher wonders where Alice disappeared to and Masquerade continues his battle against Exedra and things are not going so well. Dan and Shun's battle rages on and things look bad when Drago goes down and does not get back up, but with encouragement from everyone, including Shun and Skyress, Drago gets back up to finish the battle. Meanwhile, Masquerade pulls a complete turn around against Exedra. The battle between Dan and Shun finally ends and the winner is Drago! Drago begins to evolve changing from Delta Dragonoid to Ultimate Dragonoid. This has allowed Dan and Drago to be deemed the new Pyrus soldiers. Meanwhile as the Brawlers celebrate, deep within the Doom Dimension, Masquerade watches as Hydranoid evolves from his battle against Exedra.
38	"Behind the Mask of Masquerade"; Transliteration: "Fight!" (Japanese: ファイト!)	December 20, 2007	March 23, 2008 (Canada); November 15, 2008 (USA)
Alice returns and her memories are all hazy as to where she has been. As Runo comforts her, Alice says she feels like she has become a different person. After that, all the Brawlers minus Alice are over at Dan's watching the news reports about all the strange weather occurring around the world, then out of the blue Joe is challenged by Masquerade to a battle for control of the Infinity Core. Dan's decides to take on Masquerade in Joe's place because Drago has evolved into an Ultimate Bakugan. Meanwhile at Runo's cafe, Alice has disappeared again. Dan and Masquerade meet and the others realize that it will be a battle between the first and second ranked Brawlers. When the battle begins, the Brawlers learn that Dual Hydranoid has evolved into Alpha Hydranoid and Masquerade learns that Delta Dragonoid has evolved into Ultimate Dragonoid. The battle wages on and neither side is giving way, resulting in several consecutive draws, but the battle arena is slowly being destroyed by the clashing powers of two powerful Bakugan. In the end though, Dan and Drago finally end up the winners. Masquerade finally sees that you do not always have to win and Dan asks him to join the team believing that they can help in the battle against Naga. But in a final twist, just as Masquerade is about to shake Dan's hand, he stops and, lifting his hand up to his mask, Masquerade tells Dan that joining the team would not work out, and he pulls off his mask. As Dan and the other Brawlers look on in shock, Masquerade's hair colour changes from yellow to red and falls down to rest at her shoulders. Masquerade has finally been unmasked and is revealed to be none other than Alice.
39	"Masquerade Unmasked"; Transliteration: "Never-ending Journey" (Japanese: 終わりなき旅)	December 27, 2007	March 30, 2008 (Canada); November 22, 2008 (USA)
Masquerade battles Dan, though he ends up losing. After the battle is over, Masquerade takes off his mask, and the Brawlers find out he is none other than Alice. Suddenly, Hal-G appears (as a holographic projection) and explains how he and Alice became their alter-egos after being exposed to the negative energy from the Silent Core once Naga tried getting it when the energy seeped through Dr. Michael's Gateway Transporter. After finding out that she is Masquerade, Alice feels guilty for everything she has done, and so she goes with Hal-G and they disappear together, much to the dismay of the other Brawlers, who were willing to forgive her. Meanwhile, strange environmental events are happening all over the world, including a giant dimensional rift to Vestroia, which suddenly appeared in the Pacific Ocean! After revealing the situation to their families, with initial shock from Julie's family and Shun's grandfather before they understand what needs to be done, the Brawlers prepare to enter the portal in order to stop Naga from destroying both worlds. What awaits them there...?
40	"Alice Gets Schooled"; Transliteration: "Until Today From Tomorrow" (Japanese: 今日までそして明日から)	N/A	April 6, 2008 (Canada); December 6, 2008 (USA)
Alice has fled to stay with her aunt and uncle, guilt-ridden over the evil acts she committed as Masquerade. When spotting some kids playing Bakugan, haunted by her past, Alice declares she does not want to have anything to do with Bakugan again. She later comes to visit Klaus at his castle. Alice tells Klaus about what she did as Masquerade. After being traumatized by her past and the danger she is put both Earth and Vestroia in with what she did as Masquerade, she tells Klaus that she no longer wants to do anything with Bakugan again. Klaus is concerned about what Alice just said, worried she cannot be serious about quitting Bakugan altogether, so he pulls her into a battle to seek revenge against her for sending his Bakugan, Sirenoid, to the Doom Dimension when she had been Masquerade. However, Klaus was just trying to teach her a lesson that everyone and everything can work together, in order to create harmony. Meanwhile, the Brawlers prepare to enter the dimensional rift to Vestroia in order to stop Naga. Will Alice survive to join her five best friends?
41	"A Fish Called Tayghen"; Transliteration: "World of Ice" (Japanese: 氷の世界)	January 10, 2008	April 13, 2008 (Canada); December 13, 2008 (USA)
After jumping into the dimensional rift found in the middle of an ocean, the Brawlers arrive in a Ventus/Aquos world. They realize Vestroia has become a hybrid world, because of the merged attributes. While trying to make their way to the core of Vestroia, they encounter Aquos/Ventus hybrids: Tayghen and Hairadee. Shun and Marucho step up to fight them while Dan and the others enter the gate to the Subterra/Haos world. Shun and Marucho find the hybrid Bakugan difficult to defeat due to the combination of the attributes, but succeed in defeating them in the end. What type of Bakugan will Dan and the others encounter in their journey to stop Naga?
42	"The Race to Vestroia"; Transliteration: "I Can't Stop It" (Japanese: どうにもとまらない)	January 17, 2008	April 20, 2008 (Canada); December 20, 2008 (USA)
Dan, Julie and Runo land in the Subterra/Haos world. They are greeted by Rabeeder and Tricloid, two of Naga's lackeys, the Earth and Light world Gatekeepers. Rabeeder and Tricloid challenge them to a race to the gate to the Pyrus/Darkus world. The race is more difficult than expected and the girls have to stay behind to slow the hybrids down. Dan continues onto the next merged world with only Drago by his side.
43	"Next Stop Naga-Vile"; Transliteration: "Soldier's Rest" (Japanese: 戦士の休息)	January 24, 2008	April 27, 2008 (Canada); December 27, 2008 (USA)
Dan and Drago enter the combined world of Pyrus and Darkus where a group of Darkus Gargonoids are running rampant. All of a sudden, two hybrid Bakugan show up, revealing their names as Druman and Centorrior. An old friend of Drago's manages to save them; Nova Lion. He explains how the negative energy has been influencing all of Vestroia, except those who can hide. He was later killed in a battle against Centorrior and Druman. After a long battle raged on against Dan and Drago vs Centorrior and Druman, Alice makes her final decision on whether or not she will be a full member of the Brawlers, visiting Klaus to ask for his help to get to Vestroia to help the other Brawlers.
44	"It's a Long Shot!"; Transliteration: "Sniping" (Japanese: 狙いうち)	January 31, 2008	May 4, 2008 (Canada); January 3, 2009 (USA)
Klaus flies Alice to the Vestroia portal, where as she jumps and skydives toward it, she summons Masquerade's mask and transforms into him one last time to get his support to help Dan and Drago. Masquerade and Hydranoid arrive just in time to save Dan and Drago from Centorrior and Druman. Knowing that without a plan, they will not be able to win, the duo retreat. They come up with a plan to take out Druman and Centorrior. Everything begins to go as planned, with Drago luring Druman while Hydranoid gets Centorrior's attention. All is well when Centorrior and Druman are in range of the gate card, and Masquerade activates the gate card and the two are slowly defeated. Suddenly the plan crumbles and falls apart as Druman destroys the gate card. Drago then attacks Druman, although Druman reflects the attack, bouncing off and hitting Hydranoid, causing Masquerade and Alpha Hydranoid to fall off the cliff and the Battle Brawlers look like they have failed. The battle rages on as Drago tries to get Druman and Centorrior to a specific area. It turned out that Masquerade and Dan predicted that Druman would reflect the attack, knocking off Hydranoid. Druman and Centorrior did not realize Alpha Hydranoid had wings, making Hydranoid and Masquerade able to survive the fall. Dan and Drago carry on the fight to get Druman and Centorrior onto a specific area. Dan then gives Masquerade a signal, at which point Hydranoid and Masquerade activate a long-ranged powerful attack which seem to destroy Druman and Centorrior. Later on, it is shown that Druman and Centorrior were given orders from Naga to lose on purpose in order to stall the Brawlers. After the match, Masquerade takes off his mask, turning back into Alice and entrusting his powers over to her, including Alpha Hydranoid, making him Alice's Guardian Bakugan. Shun, Marucho, Runo and Julie arrive back form the previous worlds and are all surprised Alice is here. All the brawlers, one by one, forgive Alice and all is forgotten. The six Brawlers then progress to see Naga in the last world. Also, Alice and Hydranoid have become the new Darkus soldiers.
45	"Ground Control to Major Dan"; Transliteration: "Do You Think This is a Joke?" (Japanese: 冗談じゃねぇ)	February 7, 2008	May 11, 2008 (Canada); January 10, 2009 (USA)
As the Brawlers reach the center of Vestroia, they discover that Naga is no longer there. Meanwhile, Naga appears on Earth to move onto the next phase of his plans. Naga closes the portal that connects Vestroia to Earth, a portal he opened to deliberately lead the Brawlers into and then he begins to open more portals around the world to let in his Bakugan army. Naga's ultimate goal is to capture Wavern and to take the Infinity Core and with the Brawlers out of the picture, it looks like he will succeed. But, Joe does not give up and sends a message for help to any and all brawlers willing to fight against Naga and his minions. Battlers from all over the world, including top brawlers Chan, Klaus, Billy, Komba and Julio, answer Joe's message and with their Bakugan, go on the offensive against Naga and his team. Komba and Harpus lead one group of battlers against Tayghen, while Julio and Tentaclear lead another group against Tricloid, and Billy leads a third team against Rabeeder. Meanwhile, Chan and Fourtress do a 1-on-1 battle against Centorrior and Klaus leads a fourth team against Druman and Hairadee. As the battle rages on, people from all over the world watch as kids and their Bakugan fight to protect the lives of everyone on the planet, and with the support of everyone, the battlers are slowly forcing their enemies back. But, things take a turn for the worse when Naga uses the Silent Core to boost the power of his Bakugan and weaken the others. Not only that, but by using the Silent Core, Naga has finally located Wavern! As the Bakugan from all the battlers are defeated, Naga's forces begin to converge on Wavern's location. Wavern, in a last stand, puts up a force field to protect the city, but everyone is still giving up until they are reminded that they still have the Battle Brawlers on their side. Wavern and Joe are finally able to contact the Brawlers and tell them that Naga has entered their world. Wavern opens a portal to Earth and the Battle Brawlers use it to return home.
46	"The One Hit Wonders"; Transliteration: "Man's Decoration" (Japanese: 男の勲章)	February 14, 2008	May 18, 2008 (Canada); January 17, 2009 (USA)
Naga's hybrid soldiers invade Earth and come to take the Infinity Core from Wavern. Quickly, the Brawlers split up to stop them from reaching Wardington, with Julie volunteering to go after Tricloid, while Alice volunteers to go after Rabeeder, now that she is a Battle Brawler with Alpha Hydranoid as her partner. Marucho finds himself confronted by Tayghen again. They battle against each other with Jenny and Jewels coming to assist Marucho in battle. After the battle is over with the Brawlers finishing victorious, Marucho receives a kiss from this famous female music duo.
47	"Here's Mud in Your Eye!"; Transliteration: "Good Night Baby" (Japanese: グッド·ナイト·ベイビー)	February 21, 2008	May 25, 2008 (Canada); January 24, 2009 (USA)
At the beginning of the episode, we find Naga promising to make Tricloid immortal and let her see her younger sister again. That is of course, if she can eliminate the Brawlers once and for all. To accomplish this task, Naga gives Tricloid a Subterra power boost of negative energy from the mighty Silent Core, which makes her more corrupted with evil energy. Tricloid tracks down Julie and Billy and to their surprise challenges them to a brawl. They accept, but Tricloid is much stronger than they expected. When the battle becomes more and more difficult, a "friend" of the Brawlers shows up to help defeat Tricloid.
48	"R is for Revenge"; Transliteration: "This Is My Path of Living" (Japanese: これが私の生きる道)	February 28, 2008	June 1, 2008 (Canada); January 31, 2009 (USA)
Naga's troops have finally infiltrated Wardington after being defeated twice already. Alice discovers that Tricloid's sister Rabeeder is invading the town. Little does she know the one she trained before, Christopher, will also get involved in the battle. Dan is informed that Hairadee, Centorrior and Druman are also approaching the city following Tayghen's death and Tricloid's defeat. When it appears these two are being overpowered, Klaus arrives. The three soon realize all Rabeeder is doing is being controlled by her worry for her sister, Tricloid. Alice starts doubting herself but, Christopher and Klaus help her. Hydranoid defeats Rabeeder (with help from Sirenoid and Juggernoid), and is reunited with Tricloid as both of them return to Vestroia, deciding to resign from Naga's army. However, afterwards, Alice runs off after seeing her grandfather, Dr. Michael, unaware it was a trap by his dark self, Hal-G, to lead him to Wavern.
49	"Showdown in Wardington"; Transliteration: "Broken-Winged Angel" (Japanese: 翼の折れたエンジェル)	March 6, 2008	June 8, 2008 (Canada); February 7, 2009 (USA)
With the Brawlers dispersed all over Wardington to locate and destroy Naga's servants, Shun finds himself in an amusement park where he is attacked by Hairadee, a Bakugan hybrid. Shun and Skyress meet up with Komba and begin to battle. At first Storm Skyress and Harpus do well against the evil Bakugan with the help of Komba O'Charlie. Later on, Hairadee creates a crystal ice cage to trap Skyress. Hairadee then pounds Skyress down with icicles. Skyress and Harpus are both tortured by Hairadee, who is far much stronger than before and overpowers Shun and Storm Skyress, leaving her trapped and Shun fighting Hairadee himself. Later, Storm Skyress is released and with the help of Komba and the unexpected arrival of Julio with his Haos Tentaclear, everyone defeats Hairadee.
50	"The Good, the Bad and the Bakugan"; Transliteration: "For Us There Is No Tomorrow" (Japanese: 俺たちに明日は無い)	March 13, 2008	June 15, 2008 (Canada); February 14, 2009 (USA)
Dan and Runo team up together, and decide to face off against Centorrior and Druman, who have arrived in the city. The battle of Drago and Blade Tigrerra vs Centorrior and Druman rages on with Dan and Runo not realizing that the battle is just a distraction for Naga to go and get the Infinity Core from his twin sister Wavern. Luckily, Shun and Skyress, as well as Chan and Fourtress, hold off Naga.
51	"The Final Brawl"; Transliteration: "Burning Life" (Japanese: 命燃やして)	March 20, 2008	June 22, 2008 (Canada); February 21, 2009 (USA)
While the Brawlers are distracted fighting against Centorrior and Druman, Naga goes after Wavern and the Infinity Core that she possesses. Dan leads the Brawlers to defeat the two hybrid Bakugan and runs off to battle Naga himself, but when Dan arrives, he finds Wavern trapped with no other choice but to give the core to her brother. Wavern tells Drago that the only way for him to win the battle is for him to kill her and take the Infinity Core from her. Drago does so, knowing that it is the only way to defeat Naga and to save Vestroia. When the battle continues with Drago losing more positive power from the Infinity Core, Drago becomes full of rage and anger of losing his beloved Wavern and evolves into the infinite Bakugan, Infinity Dragonoid.
52	"GAME OVER"; Transliteration: "Number One Battle Brawlers" (Japanese: ナンバーワン・バトルブローラーズ)	March 27, 2008	June 29, 2008 (Canada); February 28, 2009 (USA)
Drago and Naga's battle continues, until the Brawlers step forward, launching their Bakugan into battle to reinforce Drago. With the power of all six attributes, Drago overwhelms Naga and destroys him, releasing the Silent Core and absorbing it. Upon Naga's demise, Hal-G is also destroyed, reuniting Alice with her grandfather, Dr. Michael. With the battle over and the world saved, it is time for the Brawlers and their beloved Bakugan to say goodbye. After the group shares a tearful farewell, Drago opens a portal to Vestroia, allowing all Bakugan to begin their journey home. Sacrificing himself, Drago becomes the core of New Vestroia itself, restoring the Bakugan homeworld to its original state. With the Bakugan gone, everything eventually returns to normal. A few months pass, and Dan goes to the park for a date with Runo, when he hears Drago's voice one last time, wishing him well.

== See also ==
- List of Bakugan Battle Brawlers: New Vestroia episodes
- List of Bakugan: Gundalian Invaders episodes
- List of Bakugan: Mechtanium Surge episodes
