= Courtney Marsh =

American film director

- Born: Fort Lauderdale, Florida, United States
- Occupations: Director and filmmaker
- Website: courtneynmarsh.com

Courtney Marsh is an American film director best known for her documentary Chau, Beyond the Lines for which she received an Academy Award for Best Documentary (Short Subject) nomination at the 88th Academy Awards, with Jerry Franck.

== Filmography ==
- Amuse Bouche (2009)
- ZARI (2014)
- The Tulip Chair (2015)
- Chau, Beyond the Lines (2015)
- Where Did the Adults Go? (2025)

== Awards and nominations ==
- 2015: Austin Film Festival – Grand Jury Award – Best Documentary Short Film
- 2015: USA Film Festival – National Jury Award – Documentary Short Film
- 2015: Fort Lauderdale International Film Festival – Grand Jury Award – Best Documentary Short Film
- 2016: Irvine International Film Festival - Grand Jury Award - Best Documentary Short Film
- 2016: Academy Awards - Best Documentary - Short Subject
