= Big Top Academy =

Canadian children's TV show

- Big Top Academy title screen
- Created by: Leila Basen; Lisa Hunter
- Written by: Leila Basen; Lisa Hunter
- Directed by: Guillaume Lonergan; Francois Gingras
- Starring: Drew Davis; Cameron Andres; Ava Ro; Liam Patenaude; Madison Brydges; Ellowyn Stanton; Riley O'Donnell; Samson Boldizar
- Composers: Guy Dubuc; Marc Lessard
- Country of origin: Canada
- Original language: English
- No. of seasons: 2
- No. of episodes: 52

Production
- Executive producers: Leila Basen; Johnathan Frinkelstein; Sébastian Ouimet; Carina Schulze
- Cinematography: Jean-Sébastien Desrosiers; Jean-Philippe Parizeau; Jonathan Decostes; Michel St-Martin
- Editors: Sylvain Laliberté; Martin Chenier
- Production companies: Apartment 11 Productions; Cirque Du Soleil Images

Original release
- Network: TVO Kids
- Release: February 16, 2018 – 2019

Big Top Academy is a musical children's TV show, that aired on TVO Kids throughout 2018 and 2019. The show stars a lengthy children's ensemble, including Drew Davis, Cameron Andres, Ava Ro, Liam Patenaude, Madison Brydges, Ellowyn Stanton, Riley O'Donnell, Samson Boldizar, Ana Elizaga Tecuapetla and Carson MacCormac.

The 52 episodes of the show started airing on June 10, 2018 on TVO Kids, and has also aired on Pop. The show can also be streamed on Hulu in the United States and Pop Player in the United Kingdom.

During the COVID-19 pandemic, Big Top Academy: School's Out Edition started production, filming from the cast's houses. This 26 episodes of the reboot aired on TVO Kids and Pop Player, in 2020.

== Plot ==
In a circus arts boarding school, an extraordinary group of young acrobats who dream of becoming professional circus artists, perform stunts, tricks and performances, but no one could imagine the crazy mysteries they'll find on the way, whether it is secret rooms and books, amulets or spies.

== Cast ==
- Drew Davis as Nicholas
- Cameron Andres as Maxwell
- Ava Ro as Ella
- Liam Patenaude as Chase
- Madison Brydges as April
- Ellowyn Stanton as Phoenix
- Riley O'Donnell as Celeste
- Samson Boldizar as Axel
- Marc Trottier as Sir Rayne
- Krin Haglund as Ms. Martel
- Michael Barbuto as Nicky Zolta
  - Carson MacCormac as young Nicky Zolta
- Michelle Argyris as Miss G.
- Ana Elizaga Tecuapetla as Rosa

== Release ==
TVO Kids released the first episode of Big Top Academy on June 10, 2018, along with the 52 episodes airing throughout the year, into 2019. In 2019, Pop, a free-to-air British television channel in the UK, received distribution rights to the show and started airing it in the United Kingdom. All episodes of the show are also available to stream on Hulu. The show airs in Pakistan on Pop as well.

In 2020, Apartment 11 Productions started production on a reboot filmed in the homes of the cast and surrounding areas, due to the COVID-19 pandemic, which aired on Pop Player (then called Pop Fun) and TVO Kids.

== Reception ==
The show received multiple awards and nominations for the cast, and the show itself was nominated at the Canadian Screen Award in 2020 for Best Children’s or Youth Fiction Program or Series, and was also nominated at the Youth Media Alliance Award of Excellence in 2019 for the Best Live Action Scripted Ages 6-9.
