= Julien Dubuque International Film Festival =

The Julien Dubuque International Film festival (JDIFF) is an annual film festival held in Dubuque, Iowa, United States for four days in April. In 2026, the festival extended to run a full week. The festival is named after Julien Dubuque, a French-Canadian explorer who founded the city of Dubuque. The festival was ranked in 2022 as one of the top 50 film festivals worth the submission fee by MovieMaker magazine. In 2013, the magazine had listed it as one of the "25 Coolest Film Festivals".

== History ==
The first ever Julien Dubuque International Film Festival was held on April 20, 2012, in downtown Dubuque. The festival opened with the film “Country School”. The festival's executive director Susan Gorrell told Variety that "I truly believe JDIFF is the festival for the independent. Since the inaugural festival, it has been named one of the “25 coolest film festivals in the world” by MovieMaker magazine. It is also rated one of the top 100 best rated festivals on Filmfreeway. The festival is held alongside the Mississippi River, with venues being all walking distance apart. The festival receives over 1500 submissions and selects around 120 yearly. In 2022, the festival screened 126 features from more than 50 countries. The festival is known to offer travel and accommodations for the award nominated films.

== Awards ==
The Julien Dubuque presents a total of 9 awards.

- Best Documentary
- Best Feature
- Best Short I
- Best Short II
- Best Cast
- Best Use of Music
- Best Animated Short or Feature
- Audience Choice
- Honorable Mentions
