= Bakugan Battle Brawlers: New Vestroia =

Japanese anime television series

- Season 2
- Wallpaper for Bakugan: New Vestroia series
- No. of episodes: 52

Release
- Original network: TV Tokyo; Teletoon; Cartoon Network
- Original release: April 12, 2009 – May 9, 2010

Season chronology
- ← Previous; Battle Brawlers Next → Gundalian Invaders

Bakugan Battle Brawlers: New Vestroia (爆丸バトルブローラーズ ニューヴェストロイア, Bakugan Batoru Burōrāzu Nyū Vesutoroia) is the second season of the Japanese-Canadian anime television series Bakugan Battle Brawlers. It premiered in Canada on April 12, 2009, on Teletoon and in the United States on May 9, 2009, on Cartoon Network (also airing on Disney XD as well). The season started airing on Cartoon Network in the United Kingdom on January 4, 2010. In Japan it airs on the TV Tokyo Network, starting on March 2, 2010. It is split into two arcs, but are linked to the season's story.

After an original order of 26 episodes, they revealed in the next time credits of episode 26 that the season was extended by Teletoon and Cartoon Network to be 52 episodes. Most of the episodes originally premiered in North America on Teletoon except for episodes 27 through 29, 33 through 35, and episode 43, which premiered on the Cartoon Network.

== Episode list ==
No. overall	No. in season	Title	Japanese air date	English air date
53	1	"Invasion of the Vestals" ("A New Journey"); Transliteration: "Aratanaru tabidachi" (Japanese: 新たなる旅立ち)	March 2, 2010	April 12, 2009 (Canada); May 9, 2009 (USA)
After three years of peace, New Vestroia is invaded by an alien race called the Vestals (led by their King Zenoheld). The Vestals force the Bakugan back into ball form as slaves for their amusement, not knowing that Bakugan are intelligent creatures. Having been awakened by the disturbance, Drago is helpless to watch as the original Brawlers' Bakugan are defeated and captured. Being the last hope to save his world, Drago is separated from the Perfect Core by the six legendary warriors, and heads to Earth in his restored body to reunite with his best friend Dan Kuso, now fifteen years old. The two leave for New Vestroia, with Marucho following along after overhearing Drago's plan to not involve the other Brawlers. After arriving in New Vestroia, Dan is confronted by Lync Volan and Volt Luster, two members of the Vexos, the top six brawlers among the Vestals. Just then, a girl named Mira, part of the Bakugan Brawlers Resistance, a group who knows the truth about Bakugan and fights to free them, arrives and tells Dan of the new brawling style for Bakugan battles. Dan manages to adapt to the new method quickly and Drago defeats the two Vexos easily. Lync tells Volt who Drago is and that he is the final item needed to complete Prince Hydron's collection of the petrified statue forms of the Brawlers' Bakugan. Mira also tells Dan and Marucho that the six Bakugan Brawlers are famous for saving Earth and Vestroia. With Dan, Drago, and Marucho there, Mira thinks that maybe the Resistance do have a chance of saving New Vestroia after all.
54	2	"Facing Ace" ("Synchronicity"); Transliteration: "Shinkuronishiti" (Japanese: シンクロニシティ)	March 9, 2010	April 19, 2009 (Canada); May 16, 2009 (USA)
After the battle with Lync and Volt, Dan, Drago, and Marucho go with Mira to the Resistance base. Along the way, Mira reveals that only a few people of the Vestals realize that the Bakugan are intelligent creatures, while the rest of the people have not been told. She reveals that after discovering this for herself, and becoming outraged with her father for participating in the capturing of the Bakugan, she ran off and created the Bakugan Brawlers Resistance, joining with people who thought the same as she did. Upon arriving at the base, they meet Baron, a major fan of the Bakugan Battle Brawlers and the 6 Fighting Bakugan. Shortly after, another Resistance Brawler named Ace, highly disapproves of Mira bringing humans to aid in their quest to free the Bakugan. Instead, he challenges Dan to a battle, and says that if he beats him, he and Marucho can join the Resistance in their quest to save the Bakugan. Dan gets off to a rocky start, but he and Ace are too evenly matched. With one win and one loss for each, their battle ends in a tie and they become fast best friends.
55	3	"Get Psyched" ("My Enemy Is You"); Transliteration: "Waga teki wa ware niari" (Japanese: 我が敵は我にあり)	March 16, 2010	April 26, 2009 (Canada); May 23, 2009 (USA)
Now that Dan and Marucho are part of the Resistance, they gear up and get ready to fight back against the Vexos, first by heading for Alpha City and the Alpha dimension controller, one of the machines trapping Bakugan in their ball form, to take it down. To get themselves ready, Dan offers to train Baron, who gladly agrees and can't wait for the lessons to begin but is afraid of what will happen when Dan finds out that he was the one who lost Tigrerra to Spectra. But after Lync and Volt were defeated, Spectra Phantom sends out Mylene Pharoah and Shadow Prove to ensure that the Resistance is taken care of. The next day, in the middle of his training, Baron reveals he is discouraged after losing Tigrerra to Spectra in a battle, and says he isn't worthy of the lessons. Just then Mylene and Shadow crash land and Shadow is forced by Mylene to battle Baron. Baron is discouraged and is afraid of losing Nemus the way he lost Tigrerra. But, on the brink of losing Nemus for good, Baron pulls through and wins back three of Shadow's Bakugan.
56	4	"Marucho's Mission" ("Friends"); Transliteration: "Furenzu" (Japanese: フレンズ)	March 23, 2010	May 3, 2009 (Canada); May 30, 2009 (USA)
Seeing how desperately he needs a partner to help Dan and the Resistance, Marucho takes his gear and heads out, in search of a Bakugan to battle with. At the same time, Mylene also goes hunting for Bakugan, after throwing away three she claimed useless. In the morning, Marucho meets Aquos Elfin, a Bakugan who turned out to know and have what might be a crush on Preyas. She explains that after his capture, she had to watch over the forest and protect the Bakugan living there from any harm. When Marucho asks to be partners with her, she at first declines because she claims to be "waiting for the right partner". But when Marucho explains that he needs her to help free the Bakugan (as this was what Preyas would have wanted) she says that if he passes her test, she will at least think about a "temporary partnership". As the testing goes underway, with Marucho not doing so well, Mylene flies over, and in fury, Elfin and Marucho demand she and the Vexos return the stolen Bakugan. Angered at how cruel Mylene is to the Bakugan she already carries (by throwing them away like trash), Marucho and Elfin challenge her to a brawl. Mylene, however, soon begins to show her skill and may end up winning Elfin as a new Bakugan. Just when Mylene is about to seize Elfin, a hooded figure wielding Ventus Bakugan arrives and saves Marucho. Mylene states that she's tired of losing to this hooded person and offers him to join the Vexos, but he leaves without saying a word and Mylene departs. Meanwhile, Marucho slowly awakens, despaired that Elfin was gone. But as it turned out, Elfin was merely off to find him some water, and then begins explaining how she couldn't let anything happen to her "goofy partner". In the end, Elfin and Marucho are partners, able to aid the Resistance in their journey.
57	5	"Taste of Defeat" ("Rival"); Transliteration: "Koutekishu" (Japanese: 好敵手)	April 6, 2010	May 10, 2009 (Canada); June 6, 2009 (USA)
With the Vexos losing one by one, Gus Grav calls them all together to explain that the Resistance has to be defeated. So Gus decides to take matters into his own hands and confront the Resistance, and bring pride back to the Vexos. Meanwhile, the Resistance makes a stop en route to Alpha City, where Mira gives Dan a Bakugan Trap called Coin Scorpion to help in his battles. Not much is known about the Trap Bakugan except that they are incapable or unwilling to communicate. Excited, Dan takes off to get in some training with Scorpion. Just then, Gus shows up and starts to mess with Dan's head, asking what he will gain from saving the Bakugan, leaving Dan with this question. He returns later, asking Dan what the answer is to his earlier question, and it is revealed that he is the number two brawler among the Vexos. Feeling confident, Dan decides to take him on, but is soon overwhelmed with the power of Gus' Bakugan Subterra Primo Vulcan and loses but does not care.
58	6	"Return of a Friend" ("My Friend"); Transliteration: "Tomo yo" (Japanese: 友よ)	April 13, 2010	May 17, 2009 (Canada); June 13, 2009 (USA)
Prince Hydron is furious because he still needs Drago to complete his Bakugan collection, so Gus challenges Dan to a battle in an effort to capture Drago. The Resistance is planning to attack Alpha City, but Mira wants to take a short detour to find her brother. During the ensuing argument, Ace seems and sounds like he is worried about Mira going somewhere that might be dangerous, which shows that he may have romantic feelings for her. In the midst of the argument, Dan sneaks away with Drago to fight Gus and manages to battle well until Spectra joins in and Dan starts to struggle in the fight. Out of nowhere, Shun comes to his rescue. Shun beats Gus and Dan beats Spectra when Drago displays a massive power surge due to Helios' taunts about Tigrerra. Seeing that huge amount of power, Spectra shows a hint of betrayal when he says that he won't let the magnificent Bakugan become a play thing, meaning that he won't give it to Prince Hydron if he captures it. Back at the base, Shun explains that while he was in the mountains practicing ninja moves a portal opened up right in front of him and he got sucked through to New Vestroia. This is the reason why Dan couldn't get through to him back before Drago brought him to New Vestroia. After he rescues Ingram from the Vestals, he remained in his debt and the two banded together to free the Bakugan. As they make their way closer to Alpha City and the dimension controller, Dan asks Shun why he didn't reveal himself earlier when he rescued Marucho. Shun explains that he had something important to attend to. When they approach Alpha City, Shun reveals he will break into the city and find Skyress.
59	7	"Cyber Nightmare" ("Olympis-Palace"); Transliteration: "Erekutoro・Wārudo" (Japanese: エレクトロ・ワールド)	April 20, 2010	May 24, 2009 (Canada); June 20, 2009 (USA)
After Shun successfully leads the Resistance into Alpha City, Mira departs on her own mission: searching for her older brother, Keith whom she loves and cares about very much. She heads to her home to search for clues on her brother's computer but comes up with nothing. After her father, Professor Clay, arrives, she confronts him and he simply says that "her brother is no more." When she further questions him, he leaves for his lab while Mira follows. Meanwhile, Shun takes the others to check out the control spire and they learn that the battles that take place in the arena below the controller are synchronized with the controller's power. At the lab, Mira witnesses the birth of the first cybernetic Bakugan: Ventus Altair. As the boys make their way to her location, Mira is confronted by Lync, who is armed with Altair. During the battle, Mira seems to have the upper hand with Wilda and her trap Baliton. That is until Lync activates two Double Abilities in a row. The scientists are worried about Altair's power fluctuation but Prof. Clay orders Lync to destroy Wilda and Baliton. Before he can, the massive overload causes Altair to crash and shut down, ending the battle. Professor Clay decides to use the data to perfect and modify Altair into the strongest and most powerful Bakugan ever living.
60	8	"What's the Plan?" ("Challenger"); Transliteration: "Chousensha" (Japanese: 挑戦者)	April 27, 2010	May 31, 2009 (Canada); June 27, 2009 (USA)
Ace and Shun team up in a Bakugan battle tournament in order to overload the dimension controller because it draws power from Bakugan battles. After Marucho is "purposely" disqualified in the singles round, he sneaks the others in. They almost get caught by some guards until Mira pretends to be a huge Vexos fan and they manage to slip away. As they remain hidden, the Vexos show up and Mira notices that Spectra tosses his Bakugan the same way as her lost brother Keith. Meanwhile, Ace and Shun are having trouble getting along in the battle tournament and are starting to lose against the Dark Angels who are Vexos wannabes. When their opponents begin taunting them, Shun and Ace put their differences aside and finally come up with a plan. They win with ease while claiming their opponent's Bakugan. Shun and Ace prepare for their match against Lync and Volt.
61	9	"Freedom Run" ("The Door to Hope"); Transliteration: "Jiyuu heno tobira" (Japanese: 自由への扉)	May 4, 2010	June 7, 2009 (Canada); July 4, 2009 (USA)
Shun and Ace have made it to the finals and they prepare to battle Lync and Volt. they were brawling with Altair and volt's new Bakugan, Brontes. Meanwhile, Dan and the others head to the dimension controller but lose Marucho on the way. Things only get worse when they discover many other talking Bakugan and then they are captured by guards who are marveled by the speaking Drago. Just then Marucho drops in and saves them. Things get worse for Shun and Ace when Lync combines his Ventus Altair with Ventus trap Wired and their Bakugan traps, Hylash and Falconfly seem to have no effect. Shun and Ace discover Altair's weakness: it cannot sense multiple opponents and they manage to destroy it. While the others hold off the guards, Dan makes his way to the controller, finding that it is guarded by lasers. He throws Drago through the lasers and he hits the reverse switch, destroying the controller just as Shun and Ace defeat Lync and Volt. The newly freed Bakugan rise up from the ground and everyone in the stadium learn the truth about the Bakugan.
62	10	"Surprise Visitor" ("Labyrinth"); Transliteration: "Rabirinsu" (Japanese: ラビリンス)	May 11, 2010	June 14, 2009 (Canada); July 11, 2009 (USA)
As the Resistance heads to Beta city, there is a scene where on both sides Dan and Runo miss each other dearly so Runo decides to go to New Vestroia to help Dan in defeating the Vexos. After Kato flies her and Julie to Moscow to meet with Alice and her grandfather, Dr. Michael reveals that his transporter is not functioning properly and refuses to let Runo go. Later that night, Runo and Julie sneak into his lab and Julie prepares to send Runo off. Meanwhile, in New Vestroia, While they are having dinner Mira first hears about Runo from Dan and questions him on if he and Runo were a romantic couple (he says there not but Marucho says they are) and later that night everyone is beginning to hear their conversation because of the weakening wall between the two worlds. Runo does make it to New Vestroia but finds that she is only half way there, being unable to touch anything {she tries to hug Dan} but still able to see and speak with Dan. Prince Hydron decides to take advantage of Runo's distress by sending Shadow to make sure that Runo remains trapped. While Marucho handles Shadow, Dan takes Runo to the gate only to get attacked by Shadow's Bakugan. With Dan down, Runo rushes to help him but he urges her to go to the gate. To make matters worse, Spectra, Gus and Lync follow her through the portal as do Dan, Mira and Baron.
63	11	"Gate Crashers" ("The Melody of Beautiful Tail"); Transliteration: "Otokotachi no merodī" (Japanese: 男達のメロディー)	May 18, 2010	June 21, 2009 (Canada); July 18, 2009 (USA)
Dan, Runo, Mira and Baron make it to the human world but pick up some unwanted visitors in the form of Spectra, Gus, and Lync. Marucho manages to defeat Shadow and he, Shun and Ace decide to take out the Beta city controller to pass the time. Before Spectra takes his leave, he grabs Runo as a hostage and offers Dan an ultimatum: join the Vexos or risk Runo's safety. Dan, Julie, Baron and Mira split up and Dan and Julie run across Spectra and Runo. Mira chases after Gus to find Spectra and Baron fights Lync. Spectra reveals that he is actually against Prince Hydron's rule and wants to team up with Dan to take him down and in a show of good will, releases Runo. Mira's suspicion of Spectra being her elder brother, Keith, only rise as she believes that he infiltrated the Vexos to free the Bakugan. After Baron defeats Lync, we learn that Spectra and Gus only want to take down Hydron so that Spectra can succeed in the role of ruler of the Vestals. Meanwhile, Dan refuses to believe Spectra intentions and before anything happens, Alice warps in using Masquerade's warp card. She takes Spectra and Gus (and Dan) back to the lab where Dr. Michael sends Spectra and Gus back to New Vestroia. Unfortunately, the transporter must be repaired before another trip can be made. So, Dan takes Runo, Julie, Mira and Baron to his house for the meantime. Lync crashes in but refuses Dan's hospitality but accepts Alice's, due to his hunger, after their ride leaves. Alice doesn't like Lync one bit and tells him that when the transporter is repaired, he is "so gone". Before the credits roll, Lync is seen crying after Alice leaves him some food.
64	12	"Unmasked" ("The Man in the Cyan Dress"); Transliteration: "Kamen no otoko" (Japanese: 仮面の男)	May 25, 2010	June 28, 2009 (Canada); July 25, 2009 (USA)
Mira and Baron are stuck on Earth with Dan, Runo and Julie so Mira decides that they need to take a break so they go to an amusement park. Mira and Julie are separated from the rest of the group and run into Spectra and Gus who say that they came back to Earth by tracking down Dan's Gauntlet to the amusement park. Mira wants to know if Spectra is her brother Keith so she decides to brawl against him. However, Gus rearranges their little deal so she battles Gus instead. If she wins, Spectra takes off his mask but if she loses, she has to join the Vexos against Prince Hydron. At first, Mira struggles against Gus' abilities, but with help from the "original" Subterra master Julie and her copycat ability card, Mira pulls through and defeats Gus. Despite Gus attempts to dissuade Spectra, he removes his mask and is revealed to truly be Mira's beloved elder brother Keith! Mira is now feeling very sad because she knows now that her brother is on the dark side.
65	13	"Voices in the Night" ("Trap"); Transliteration: "Wana" (Japanese: 罠)	June 1, 2010	July 5, 2009 (Canada); August 1, 2009 (USA)
While Mira and Baron help out at Runo's family's cafe, Ace, Shun and Marucho head to Beta City to shut down the controller, which has grown stronger due to Drago (and the Perfect Core's) absence. Hydron sends Mylene to deal with the resistance in Spectra's absence and states to himself that, when he returns, Spectra will find that the Vexos have a new leader. Later at night, Ace, Shun and Marucho hear the voices of Mira and Dan (respectively) and head out into the night, but it turns out that Shadow is the one making the fake voices. By the time Shun realizes it's a trap, Marucho and Ace fall for it. Ace wakes up in another place and finds Mylene. Realizing that he has fallen for a trap. Ace begins struggling to defeat Mylene and her new attribute changing Bakugan, Elico. In a flashback it is revealed that Ace is rumored to be a top brawler possibly stronger than the Vexos but refuses to enter tournaments. Mira confronts him and asks him to join her team. After he lost to her, she gave him Percival and he learned the truth about Bakugan. Meanwhile, in Ace's battle with Mylene, Ace becomes submerged in water and loses to Mylene. He does not arise, but is lost at sea.
66	14	"Duel in the Dunes" ("The Desert Sun"); Transliteration: "Gatsu no sabaku" (Japanese: 月の砂漠)	June 8, 2010	July 12, 2009 (Canada); August 8, 2009 (USA)
Marucho finds himself in a desert with Elfin. After falling into quicksand, he is rescued by Volt who later engages him in a battle. Marucho seems to be doing well with his new trap, Tripod Epsilon but when Volt pulls out his mechanical trap, Dynamo, things get rough and Marucho is defeated and sunken in quicksand. Back on Earth, Mira and Baron hang out at Dan's, who after waking up from a dream, is still eager to return to New Vestroia in order to help Shun and Marucho.
67	15	"Last One Standing" ("Become the Flame"); Transliteration: "Kaze ni nare" (Japanese: 風になれ)	June 15, 2010	July 19, 2009 (Canada); August 15, 2009 (USA)
With Ace and Marucho captured by the Vexos, Shun decides to head to Beta City alone to destroy the controller. On the way, he is ambushed by Shadow Prove, who is armed with Darkus Hydranoid. In the middle of the battle, Shun and Ingram realize that it is not the same Hydranoid they know but in fact the brand-new mechanical Bakugan Darkus Hades, created from Hydranoid's DNA and possessing none of the weaknesses that Altair had. Shun tries his best to hold his ground but Ingram and Hylash are no match for Hades and Bakugan Trap Darkus Fortress. Shun contemplates throwing in the towel out of fear of losing his partner like how he almost lost Skyress in a tough battle, but Ingram convinces him otherwise and that he will always be there next to him. Shun is defeated by Shadow and passes out as Shadow laughs in Shun's dilated pupil. The Vexos, having now captured the rest of the Resistance, plan to keep them as hostages while keeping Dan and the others stuck on Earth forever and while they take all Bakugan.
68	16	"Show Me the Power!" ("Cold Rain"); Transliteration: "Tsumetai Ame" (Japanese: 冷たい雨)	June 22, 2010	July 26, 2009 (Canada); August 22, 2009 (USA)
Spectra and Gus, stuck on Earth, stay in an abandoned factory. When Gus returns with "juice in boxes",(there's no such thing as juice boxes on Vestal) he finds that Spectra is gone. While Dan trains Baron, Spectra runs into a fortune teller who tells him that if he stays on the path he has chosen then he will meet his end, but Spectra does not listen to her. Spectra decides to take Drago by force, now being tired of waiting for Dan to join him. He sends one of Gus' hornets to challenge him and they meet in the arena where he last fought Masquerade. Mira, Baron and Runo worry about Dan being out on his own. In the first round Dan takes a major loss, but manages to strike back with Pyrus Scorpion. But then Spectra pulls out his own mechanical Bakugan Trap Pyrus Multisided Metalfencer. Helios gets frustrated and demands that Spectra gives him more power. Spectra willingly obliges and activates a forbidden ability card to give Helios absolute power. Dan and Drago are disgusted by this massive power and what it could do to Helios, but neither Spectra nor Helios seem to care about the consequences. Drago is no match for this power and loses, with Spectra claiming him as his prize. Dan is shocked in the pupil of his right eye at the loss of his partner while Spectra walks by the same fortune-teller who is shocked by how much darker his future has become. Once again, Spectra does not care.
69	17	"Dude, Where's My Bakugan?" ("Black Moon"); Transliteration: "Kuroi taiyou" (Japanese: 黒い太陽)	June 29, 2010	August 2, 2009 (Canada); August 29, 2009 (USA)
Dan is upset about losing Drago but tries to move on and think of ways to get him back: starting with all-out intensive training. Meanwhile, on New Vestroia, Mylene wants to close to portal to keep Dan and the others on Earth, but Prince Hydron orders her not to, so as to allow Spectra and Gus time to return, which angers Mylene, who greatly enjoys her new power. Apollonir states that they must retrieve Drago as the Perfect Core is losing power and the other two dimension controllers are growing stronger. While training, Dan faints and develops a fever. He runs out into the park calling out to Drago, lamenting over how he lost Drago. All of a sudden, Apollonir shows up and to retrieve Drago, but Dan regrets to inform him that he lost Drago. Apollonir is disappointed that Dan has given up so easily and suggests that Drago is also upset at himself for losing the battle and letting Dan down. Dan wakes up, with his fever broken, to find that Apollonir has crossed over to Earth. Apollonir, linked to the Perfect Core like Drago, and is easily able to find Spectra and teleport everyone there. Spectra accepts Dan's challenge but brings out Helios to test if Apollonir is worthy of fighting Drago. Apollonir lectures Spectra on true Bakugan spirit but Spectra believes that power is the only way to win and brings out his Bakugan Trap Metalfencer. However, Apollonir easily takes them both down in one hit. Spectra finally sends out Drago, but Dan is very shocked to witness his best and closest friend has been altered in appearance while under Spectra's control.
70	18	"Gone, Gone Bakugan" ("A Tomorrow-less It That World"); Transliteration: "Ashita naki bousou" (Japanese: 明日なき暴走)	July 6, 2010	August 9, 2009 (Canada); September 5, 2009 (USA)
Dan, with the help of Apollonir, brawl against Drago, but Drago is not himself anymore. Spectra has turned him into a corrupted black dragon. Dan tries to reach out to his friend, but it seems that Drago is unable to listen. Spectra uses the power of many forbidden cards to access Drago's Perfect Core abilities, but it puts Drago under mounds of stress. The legendary warriors conclude that Drago should not have been able to access the Perfect Core's power and change attribute while in his new body, but the power of the forbidden cards allows him to do so. Things look bad for Apollonir, as Drago seems unstoppable with all of this infinitely limitless God-like power. Dan then notices that Drago is crying and that if he doesn't stop Spectra from giving Drago so much power, Drago could die. Apollonir believes that the only way to help Drago is to transform himself into pure energy and enter Drago's body to absorb the extra energy, however, Apollonir will not be able to attack or defend himself. Also, Dan must throw Apollonir into Drago's chest, but if he misses, Drago's condition could worsen and Dan may end up killing Drago and New Vestroia may turn back into six separate worlds. Dan successfully launches Apollonir into Drago's chest and Drago falls, defeated, returning to his normal self. Dan and Drago are happily reunited while Spectra does not seem that affected by the loss, and only insists that things will be different the next time they meet.
71	19	"Family Ties" ("Return Since Then..."); Transliteration: "Soshite... meguriai" (Japanese: そして…めぐり逢い)	July 13, 2010	August 16, 2009 (Canada); September 12, 2009 (USA)
The Resistance is ready to head back to New Vestroia and Dan wants to bring Runo, Julie and Alice along. But Mira suggests that they spend one last day for Dan to say goodbye to his parents. Alice uses her teleportation card and Lync convinces her to take him too, but he really just needs to meet up with Spectra and Gus. As Dan and the others meet Alice at the tower, Apollonir opens a portal to New Vestroia. However, they are ambushed by Spectra, Gus and Lync and to make matters worse, Mira betrays them and heads into the portal after explaining that Spectra is none other than her older brother. Dan and the others miss their chance and Apollonir is not strong enough to open another portal, so Alice takes them back to Russia to use her grandfather's transport machine. But, because Dr. Michael used the technology in Lync's Gauntlet to repair the machine and only those with Gauntlets can go through, meaning that Runo, Julie and Alice must stay behind. When Runo lies that she never really wanted to go to New Vestroia and lashes out at Dan telling him to never come back he grabs her hands and says how he's sorry she's not coming and they gaze into each other's eyes until the machine is ready he slowly lets her hands go. After that heartfelt goodbye with Runo, Dan, as well as Baron head through the transporter.
72	20	"Beta City Blues" ("A Voice of Beauty"); Transliteration: "Uragiri no machikado" (Japanese: 裏切りの街角)	July 20, 2010	August 23, 2009 (Canada); September 19, 2009 (USA)
As Dan and Baron safely make it back to New Vestroia, they find their base completely empty with no sign of Shun, Ace or Marucho anywhere. They discover that they are near Beta City and believe that Shun, Ace and Marucho have gone there to destroy the next dimension controller, so they decide to go to Beta to give the three backup. Meanwhile, as Spectra makes his return, the other Vexos are shocked to see that Mira is with him, saying that she has joined the Vexos. However, in her mind, she only wants to find out what Keith is really up to. Also, she discovers that Shun, Ace and Marucho have been captured and are being held hostage. She tries to release them. Dan and Baron sneak into Beta City and battle Mylene and Shadow. Meanwhile Mira is interrupted by Spectra who helps her release her friends, but he tells her that she owes him a debt. As the battle wages on, Baron is defeated defending Drago, who taps into the power of the Perfect Core, defeating Mylene and Shadow easily as well as destroying the dimension controller. Ace, Shun and Marucho reunite with Dan and Baron and they make their leave from Beta City. Later, Mylene accuses Spectra of her loss and the escape of the prisoners but Gus reminds her that she lost the battle, not him. Mira is still left wondering what her brother is up to.
73	21	"Brotherly Love" ("reBirth"); Transliteration: "Tanjou" (Japanese: 誕生)	July 27, 2010	August 30, 2009 (Canada); September 26, 2009 (USA)
Mira is uncertain of her brother's intentions while in Gamma City. Meanwhile, Ace is unconvinced that Mira has betrayed them due to his feelings for her, but they all resolve to head to Gamma City for the final controller. That night, Spectra invites Mira to dinner where he asks her to join him because he needs her and cannot accomplish his goal without her. Mira is unsure and retires for the night. Later she contacts Spectra asking to battle him and let that decide her fate: if she loses, she will serve him but if she wins, he must go back to being her brother. However, after Helios has volunteered to become a cyborg Bakugan after Prof. Clay had collected data on Drago while he was in Spectra's possession. Wilda and Baliton prove to be no match for Cyborg Helios and Mira loses.
74	22	"Underground Take Down" ("Heaven and Hell"); Transliteration: "Tengoku to jigoku" (Japanese: 天国と地獄)	August 3, 2010	September 6, 2009 (Canada); October 3, 2009 (USA)
Mira and Spectra meet with Prince Hydron, who shows her his collection and later receives a message from his father, who is angered by the destruction of the other two controllers. Hydron then orders Mylene to divide and conquer the Resistance, since she has shown that they are weaker on their own and orders Lync to keep an eye on Spectra and make sure that his new mechanical Bakugan is ready for battle. The Resistance arrives and Ace and Baron explain that the controller is underground and is the strongest of all Bakugan. They all head in but encounter Volt. Baron deals with Volt while the others proceed discovering that Gamma City is not a real city but a research facility. All of a sudden, Shadow and Mylene appear and Shun and Marucho step in to battle. Spectra takes Mira to see a team of special mechanical Bakugan that he and Dr. Clay had designed themselves that were intended for Hydron but he intends to make certain that they only obey him. Spectra then orders Mira and Gus to use the Bakugan to battle Dan and Ace to collect data on Drago and Percival. Meanwhile, the others gain the upper hand against the Vexos. Dan and Ace continue to the controller but encounter Gus and Mira. Ace is shocked that Mira has truly betrayed them and Gus orders Mira to prove that she is loyal to Spectra.
75	23	"Wall to Wall Brawl" ("Lies"); Transliteration: "Uso" (Japanese: うそ)	August 10, 2010	September 13, 2009 (Canada); October 10, 2009 (USA)
Dan and Ace engage Mira and Gus in battle against their mechanical Bakugan. During the battle, Mira seems to be purposely losing. Baron, Shun and Marucho have beaten the other Vexos and arrive in time to see Dan and Ace win, claiming the mechanical Maxus Dragonoid traps. (Baron beats Volt; Shun & Marucho beat Shadow and Mylene). Spectra is furious at Mira's betrayal, claiming that they have even stronger Bakugan than the ones Gus and Mira used. The final dimension controller is destroyed and Mira apologizes for betraying the Resistance, but they welcome her back into the group otherwise. They next head to the Vestal Palace to free all the original Guardian Bakugan and save New Vestroia for good.
76	24	"Ultimate Bakugan" ("Blue Impact"); Transliteration: "Akai shougeki" (Japanese: 赤い衝撃)	August 17, 2010	September 20, 2009 (Canada); October 17, 2009 (USA)
With Mira returned, and the Resistance reunited, Dan and the others head for Prince Hydron's sky palace to free Skyress, Tigrerra, Preyas, Gorem, and Hydranoid from captivity. But before they can even get close enough, Hydron activates another dimension controller, causing the Bakugan to turn back into ball form. Quickly thinking, Shun grabs Mira and Marucho and grapples onto the top of a rising elevator and to safety. Down below, Dan, Baron, and Ace are saved just in time by their Bakugan. But before they can think of a way to get up to the palace, Spectra and Cyber Helios challenge them to a battle. As Dan and Drago struggle to fight back against the power Helios now possesses, Shun, Marucho, and Mira have managed to sneak into Hydron's throne room and discover the bronze statues of the five other Guardian Bakugan, just before meeting face to face with Prince Hydron himself. Meanwhile, Mylene, Volt, and Shadow order Dr. Clay to give them an escape off of New Vestroia, as the energy from the battle between Cyber Helios and Drago could destroy everything around them. Dr. Clay at first refuses saying that it would be treason, when Shadow reminds him he works for the Vexos now. Gus overhears their plan, but before he can warn Spectra, Lync hits him over the head and knocks him into a room, locking Gus inside so he can't tell Spectra of their plan. Back with Dan and Drago, Spectra, having underestimated the perfect core's power, has used the mechanical Bakugan he has to make Maxus Helios, a Bakugan who has all six attributes. Dan tries to use a combination of Ability Cards that tap into the Perfect Core's power, but still can't match Maxus Helios's power. Dan realizes he has no choice but to use the Bakugan he got from his battle with Mira to make Maxus Dragonoid, just as Spectra has again used the other six mechanical Bakugan on Helios. The two Bakugan face each other, preparing for the final battle.
77	25	"Final Countdown" ("The Battle of Lost Memories"); Transliteration: "Kagiri naki tatakai" (Japanese: 限りなき戦い)	August 24, 2010	September 27, 2009 (Canada); October 24, 2009 (USA)
As the battle between Maxus Dragonoid and Maxus Helios rages on, Mylene interrupts Hydron in his collection room by dragging him off. She explains that they are leaving New Vestroia. Hydron refuses at first, being afraid to face his father due to his failure to successfully occupy New Vestroia, but agrees to Mylene's plan to label Spectra as a traitor. Meanwhile, Mira, Marucho and Shun try to activate a machine to reverse the process of Preyas, Gorem, Tigrerra, Hydranoid and Skyress's petrification but are unable to determine the numeric code. Dan and Drago take to the skies to battle Spectra and Helios but the power coming from their battle is far too much and they crash into the palace. Mylene prepares for their departure from New Vestroia but not before tossing out Elico and Brontes, believing that Bakugan with feelings are useless and imperfect fighting machines, since Dr. Clay has already created many powerful mechanical Bakugan. Out of a stroke of luck, Elfin discovers the activation code, but with the palace's self-destruction under way it may be too late.
78	26	"Reunion" ("Final Battle"); Transliteration: "Saishū kessen" (Japanese: 最終決戦)	August 31, 2010	October 4, 2009 (Canada); October 31, 2009 (USA)
As Dan and Spectra continue their battle, and the self destruct sequence begins counting down, the rest of the six fighting Bakugan are freed from their prisons. As Shun and Marucho are reunited with Skyress and Preyas, the Bakugan in Dan and Spectra's battle suddenly return to ball-like states, and the battle ends in a tie. But CyberHelios wants to continue fighting, even if the battle is over. Cyber Helios and Drago engage just as Ace and Baron, riding on Percival and Nemus, meet up with Shun, Marucho, Mira, and the rest of the 6 Fighting Bakugan. As Cyber Helios and Drago battle, Spectra draws a blade, and forces Dan to battle him one on one. Before either battle can reach a conclusion, the Vestal palace explodes, barely giving Dan and Drago any time to escape as Spectra and Cyber Helios retreat with Gus, Brontes, and Elico (who were thrown out of the escape craft by Mylene). Gus immediately informs Spectra that the others left New Vestroia to blame the occupation's failure entirely on Spectra's betrayal. Spectra merely states that he never really planned on returning to the Vestal home world anyway. Meanwhile, the Resistance celebrates their victory of liberating New Vestroia and freeing the Bakugan. Mira, Ace, and Baron decide to return to their world to prevent the Vexos from ever returning to New Vestroia and enslaving the Bakugan again. The others decide to return to Earth with their Bakugan and the original fighting Bakugan, but Skyress declines the offer, saying that she can't bear to leave her home again and that Shun's future lies with Ingram. Right after Skyress leaves, Drago and Dan regrettably inform Marucho and the others that Drago cannot leave New Vestroia, as the Perfect Core is a part of him. But then Apollonir and the rest of the legendary soldiers appear and grant Drago freedom to live wherever he pleases, since he has become strong enough to be separated from the Perfect Core. With the ability to go back and forth between the worlds, Drago opens a portal in order for Dan, Marucho, Shun, and their Bakugan to return to Earth. Various portals open up across the world, allowing Alice and Julie to reunite with their Bakugan as well. Dan arrives at Runo's family's cafe and tells her New Vestroia has been saved. Just as he believes Runo is about to run to hug him, she scoops up Tigrerra, reunited with her Bakugan as well. Embarrassed, Dan yells at an amused Drago to never speak of this again. Soon Marucho, Shun and Julie walk in with their respective Bakugan, the original Bakugan Battle Brawlers are back together again.
79	27	"Six Degrees of Destruction" ("The Battle Isn't Over"); Transliteration: "Tatakai wa owaranai!" (Japanese: 戦いは終わらない！)	September 7, 2010	November 7, 2009
Six months have passed since New Vestroia was liberated. Angered by his defeat in Vestroia and his exile of Vestal, King Zenoheld has commissioned Dr. Clay to construct the Bakugan Termination System, a machine that when used, kills all Bakugan in a predetermined radius. However, the six attributes are needed to activate it. Meanwhile, Mira returns to Earth to pay Dan, Marucho, Runo, Julie and Shun a visit. King Zenoheld then challenges the six ancient warriors to a battle for their attribute energy. At first the six ancient warriors are doing great until Zenoheld combines his Mechanical Bakugan and easily overpowers the warriors. In a last-ditch attempt, the ancient warriors sacrifice themselves and pass on their attribute powers to Drago, Elfin, Ingram, Wilda, Nemus and Percival, causing them to evolve. Having witnessed what happened in a vision, Dan, Marucho, Shun and Mira regain consciousness to find their Bakugan have truly evolved, and realize that New Vestroia is in danger.
80	28	"Revenge of the Vexos" ("Crime and Punishment"); Transliteration: "Tsumi to batsu" (Japanese: 罪と罰)	September 14, 2010	November 14, 2009
To obtain the Six Elemental Attributes, King Zenoheld has the Vexos search for the Bakugan Brawlers Resistance. Baron, after talking with Ace, decides to move out due to the lack of space in his home occupied by his giant family. While taking his siblings to the park, he runs into Prince Hydron who engages him in battle. All seems well when Nemus pulls out his attribute change ability, but he proves to be no match for Hydron's Subterra Dryoid. Mega Nemus loses the battle and the Haos energy. Baron must find a way to warn Dan and the others about the Vexos' return before they get targeted as well.
81	29	"Saved by the Siren" ("The Legend of Sapphire"); Transliteration: "Emerarudo no densetsu" (Japanese: エメラルドの伝説)	September 21, 2010	November 21, 2009
While Dan is shocked by a surprise visit from his father and Mira reminisces over Keith, Ace searches the city for a place Baron can stay. As he approaches a future building site for an apartments complex, Baron calls Ace and tells him how the Haos Energy was stolen by Hydron. Then Mylene appears and challenges Ace for the Darkus Energy. As the battle drags on Ace and Midnight Percival eventually become overwhelmed by her mechanical Bakugan. Before Mylene can execute the final blow, Sirenoid appears from the lake below them, moments before Klaus, and joins Midnight Percival in battle. With their combined efforts, they manage to drive Mylene away, right after she says she will return with the rest of the Vexos for the Darkus Energy. It is revealed Klaus helped Dr. Michael develop his dimensional transporter system. After meeting up with Sirenoid, his foundation continues to fund the scientist's research as well as managing timeshare on Vestal. By the end of the episode, Baron had arrived to join them and Ace has become frustrated with Klaus's constantly calling him 'boy'.
82	30	"The Day New Vestroia Stood Still" ("The Last Day of the World"); Transliteration: "Sekai ga owaru nichi" (Japanese: 世界が終わる日)	September 28, 2010	November 29, 2009 (Canada); December 5, 2009 (USA)
Klaus, Baron and Ace successfully contact Dan and warn them about the Vexos, so Dan decides to head to Vestal and face the Vexos. However, when Zenoheld decides to test the BT system, Shun heads to New Vestroia with his newly evolved - Master Ingram, while the others head to Vestal. Once Shun arrives, he finds that all the Bakugan are missing and Master Ingram is still in ball form. Skyress arrives and tells him that a metal sphere came from the sky and sent a beam that trapped all the Bakugan in ball form. Shun attempts to destroy the device but finds that it is protected by a force field. All of a sudden, Lync appears to take the Ventus energy and a battle ensues. When Master Ingram and Hylash have trouble against Lync's new mechanical Bakugan, Ventus Aluze, Shun is forced to call on Skyress for help. During the battle, Master Ingram begins feeling doubt about his evolution and is taken out of the battle. When Skyress begins struggling against Lync, Master Ingram decides to embrace his new powers and enters the battle, defeating Lync. In the aftermath, Skyress disappears and wishes Shun and Ingram good luck.
83	31	"Spectra Rises" ("Brotherly Destiny"); Transliteration: "Akai unmei" (Japanese: 赤い運命)	October 2, 2010	December 6, 2009 (Canada); December 12, 2009 (USA)
Mira, Dan and Marucho head to Vestal to meet Klaus, Baron and Ace at Klaus' mansion. It is there Volt comes to retrieve the Pyrus energy after being humiliated by Prince Hydron. Volt and Dan are about to battle when Spectra and Gus appear out of nowhere. Gus attacks Volt psychologically by saying he stole Brontes' soul, as shown in the beginning of the episode when he forces Brontes, Elico, and Vulcan to evolve using a Forbidden Card. Volt backs away to let Spectra brawl Dan. Mira, Magma Wilda, Marucho and Minx Elfin join in the brawl to help Dan and Cross Dragonoid. Despite his friends being defeated, Dan manages to beat Spectra using the power Drago received from Apollonir, despite Helios's upgrades. However, before Spectra leaves, he warns Dan that they will meet again.
84	32	"Shadow Attack" ("Wing-Pegasus Lady"); Transliteration: "Kan Fū Redi" (Japanese: カンフーレディ)	October 9, 2010	December 13, 2009 (Canada); December 19, 2009 (USA)
Spectra makes a false appeal to the Vestals that he is the hero and is trying to stop Zenoheld from ruling all dimensions. On Vestal, Dan and the others propose to stop whatever he is planning. Zenoheld and the Vexos realize that Spectra has stopped their ability to travel into Vestal by jamming their signals, so Zenoheld sends Shadow to earth to force Dan and the resistance to come to them. Shadow appears and frightens Alice until Chan Lee arrives and the three battle. Alice is initially hesitant to fight, as she might become Masquerade again, but eventually embraces the fearlessness of Masquerade and utterly destroys Shadow's Hades. However, Shadow then reveals his more powerful spider-like Bakugan and wins the battle in one turn. As a result of Darkus Fortress' attack, Dr. Michael's transporter system is destroyed leaving Dan and his friends trapped on Vestal. Meanwhile, Prince Hydron plans to travel to earth to lure Dan and his friends there.
85	33	"Brontes' Betrayal" ("Missing Thoughts"); Transliteration: "Tsunoru omoi" (Japanese: つのる想い)	October 16, 2010	December 26, 2009
After Alice's loss to Shadow, Alice teleports to Marucho's house to communicate with the Resistance at Klaus' house in New Vestroia. Alice warns them of the Vexos attack on her and that Runo and Julie could be next. Dan decides to head back to Earth, even though it is likely to be a trap. However, since Dr. Michael's transporter was destroyed, they at first believe it is impossible for them to return to Earth. Luckily, Klaus has one of his own. As the Resistance heads to Baron's house so he can say goodbye to his family, Spectra appears in Klaus' mansion only to find the Resistance gone and leaves Klaus with a warning that they can't hide forever. When Spectra returns to his ship, he finds Gus has answered Volt's challenge for Brontes. A battle quickly ensues between the two and Volt tries his best to not attack Brontes directly, causing him to struggle against Gus. When Volt begins to predict Brontes' moves and gain the upper hand, Gus offers Volt a place beside Spectra, but he refuses. Unfortunately, Volt is no match for his former partner, loses and passes out. Once Gus returns to Spectra's ship he says that Brontes has served his purpose and tosses him out like trash. Brontes lands on the ground, opens and cries out for Volt to save him.
86	34	"Earth Invaders" ("Invaders"); Transliteration: "Shinryakusha" (Japanese: インベーダー)	October 23, 2010	January 2, 2010
The Brawlers return to Earth and see Shun, Runo and Julie waiting for them. In order to evade the Vexos, everyone stays at Marucho's house equipped with a shield to hide the attribute energies' signal. Runo gets into a fight with Dan and thinks that he thinks that she's not strong enough to face the Vexos. Runo wanders out into the city hoping to draw in the Vexos, but Mira follows her and they are ambushed by Lync and Mylene. Things go bad and Mira loses her Subterra energy, making the Vexos one step closer to activating the BT System.
87	35	"Elfin on the Run" ("I Won't Leave You"); Transliteration: "Boku nimakasete kudasai" (Japanese: 僕にまかせてください)	October 30, 2010	January 9, 2010
After Elfin overhears Preyas talking down about her receiving the energy and rash behavior, Elfin runs off into the city and encounters Shadow Prove and Hydron. Marucho and Preyas arrive in time to rescue her and a battle ensues. At first, Elfin and Preyas have trouble getting along but they put their differences aside and almost defeat the Vexos, but Elfin shields Preyas from an attack and therefore loses the Aquos energy, giving the Vexos three of the six energies. Preyas, out of anger for Elfin's sacrifice, easily defeats Hydron and Shadow.
88	36	"Samurai Showdown" ("Samurai"); Transliteration: "Samurai" (Japanese: サムライ)	November 6, 2010	January 17, 2010 (Canada); January 23, 2010 (USA)
Baron's little sister, Maron, uses Klaus' transporter to visit Baron, so Julie and Runo suggest to him to show her around town. Meanwhile, Shun sneaks away from Marucho's house and travels to the Samurai theme attraction in the same park that Baron and Maron are at. Shun encounters Volt disguised as a samurai and a battle ensues. At the same time, Baron activates his gauntlet to show Maron how it works and learns of Shun and Volt's battle. The two easily overpower Volt, keeping the Ventus energy safe. Maron bids farewell and thanks everyone for the great day and departs...not before thanking Shun for saving her and kissing him on the cheek.
89	37	"Virtual Insanity" ("Wanted"); Transliteration: "Uonteddo" (Japanese: ウォンテッド)	November 13, 2010	January 24, 2010 (Canada); January 30, 2010 (USA)
Billy and Cycloid return to visit Julie only to find that she is at Marucho's house. On his way there, he is unknowingly followed by Mylene and Shadow. Meanwhile, Julie begins showing signs of interest in Ace after spying on him and Dan working out. After insisting she feels nothing for Billy anymore, Julie practically leaps into his arms when he arrives seconds later and introduces him to Mira, Ace and Baron. Billy is apparently caught up with everything happening after running into Klaus a while back and receiving a gauntlet from him. Not long after, Marucho's preparations for a virtual battle chamber called Bakugan Interspace are complete. The system allows anyone from all over the world play Bakugan like a game by logging on to the web. Everyone is eager to test out the machine, except for Shun, saying he has something important to take care of. Everyone draws straws to determine who goes first and Ace and Billy are chosen. Mira jealousy compels her to reveal Julie's crush on Ace to Billy and Ace, not wanting to come between their love, offers to take them both on, which they accept. As the battle rages on, Julie notices that Billy has become much stronger than before after easily defeating Percival. However, Ace easily counters back with the help of his newly evolved Trap Flash Falcon Fly. Meanwhile, Shun checks the security tapes and notices Shadow and Mylene following Billy to Marucho's house. Despite their advantage in numbers, Billy and Julie fall to Ace. After the battle, Shun urges them to return and shows them the picture of Mylene and Shadow from the security footage. Now knowing that the Vexos know where they are, they can no longer hide and wait.
90	38	"All or Nothing" ("The Olympis Crown Affair"); Transliteration: "Karei naru kake" (Japanese: 華麗なる賭け)	November 20, 2010	January 31, 2010 (Canada); February 6, 2010 (USA)
No longer able to hide from the Vexos, the brawlers realize they must now go on the offensive. They plan to storm the Mother Palace and directly attack the Bakugan Termination System instead of protecting the Attribute Energies. But without a working Dimensional Transport system or the coordinates to the Mother Palace, it at first seems there would be no way out for the brawlers. But Dan quickly realizes that they can find the location of the Mother Palace by convincing Spectra. The brawlers are hesitant, as Spectra will not likely be cooperative, and they have no way to contact him. Mira adds that there would be no way Keith would trust any of them. Meanwhile, the Vexos discover that someone has opened a portal to Earth from an entirely different universe. As Spectra makes his way to Earth, Dan and Drago admit how similar they are in both brawling abilities and lifestyles. When Runo interrupts the two for dinner, Dan and Drago are suddenly transported to Spectra's ship now that the former Vexos had broken through to Earth. Once there, Dan learns that Spectra needs the Perfect Core from Drago in order to make Helios the ultimate Bakugan. They strike a deal: if Spectra loses, he will take the Resistance to the Mother Palace, but if Spectra wins, Dan must willingly surrender the Perfect Core to Spectra. During the battle Spectra realizes that the only way Helios can defeat Drago is by using his own natural abilities and powerful will to survive and evolve. Eventually, Spectra's doubt in himself and his previous methods to perfect Helios leads to his defeat. Dan wins the fight and Spectra agrees to the terms of the bet. Everyone except Runo, Julie and Billy are transported to Spectra's ship, since he states that he would only allow the brawlers and Bakugan originally bestowed with the Bakugan Attribute Energies to go with him. As Gus prepares the ship for the transport, Spectra thanks Dan for enlightening him, and refers to him as 'my friend'. Feeling humiliated after his defeat, Helios begs Spectra to make him even stronger. Spectra agrees, saying he will use the data he received on Bakugan evolution from an anonymous source to bring out new powers and new abilities from deep inside the Bakugan.
91	39	"Avenging Spectra" ("Goodbye, My Friend"); Transliteration: "Saraba tomo yo" (Japanese: さらば友よ)	November 27, 2010	February 7, 2010 (Canada); February 20, 2010 (USA)
Spectra upholds his part of the deal to Dan and takes the brawlers to the Vestal Palace, leaving them to find the BT System on their own. Spectra and Gus leave to confront Zenoheld and Spectra tells him to leave the brawlers be. Spectra leaves, but Gus later returns and challenges Zenoheld to a battle to avenge Spectra for being framed and betrayed by the Vexos. Gus' struggles in the battle become more obvious as both Elico and Hexados sacrifice themselves to protect Vulcan and Gus. In the final match, Vulcan protects Gus, saying that his loyalty to Gus knows no bounds like Gus' loyalty to Spectra. The two stand together and take Zenoheld's final hit and falls.
92	40	"Ambush" ("Ambush"); Transliteration: "Machibuse" (Japanese: まちぶせ)	December 4, 2010	February 14, 2010 (Canada); February 27, 2010 (USA)
The Resistance split up into groups to cover more ground of the Vestal palace. Shun and Baron encounter Mylene and Volt while Ace and Marucho face Shadow and Lync. At first it looks like things are going well but the palace battlefields are revealed have been rigged to absorb the power of non-mechanical Bakugan and give it to the Vexos' mechanical Bakugan every time the latter are attacked. Therefore, the battles in the palace will be decided by the base power levels of those who are battling. Since the Resistance's Bakugan's power levels are lower, both groups are both defeated, with the Vexos claiming the Darkus and Ventus attribute energies. As the others race to find Dan, he and Mira prepare to battle Hydron with the Pyrus attribute energy at stake, while Spectra presents a proposition to Dr. Clay.
93	41	"BT: The Final Battle" ("Conqueror"); Transliteration: "Shourisha" (Japanese: 勝利者)	December 11, 2010	February 21, 2010 (Canada); March 13, 2010 (USA)
Spectra offers Dr. Clay a place by his side and the secret to Bakugan DNA, however, Dr. Clay remains loyal to Zenoheld and declares that he and Spectra are no longer father and son. After Hydron and Dan exchange prideful boasts, Spectra arrives to fight with Dan and his sister, while Zenoheld himself adds to the mix. Mira is quickly taken out by Hydron just as the others arrive, too late to warn Dan about the palace sending power to mechanical Bakugan. Spectra brings out new equipment known as "Battle Gear" for Helios and easily takes down Hydron, prompting Zenoheld to enter battle. Despite their power together, Zenoheld overpowers them with a last resort power transfer and takes the Pyrus attribute energy, making the BT system fully operational. Fortunately for the Resistance, Farbros is completely destroyed in the process. With the BT System fully active, the fate of New Vestroia's residents is grim.
94	42	"Exodus" ("To My Most Dearest"); Transliteration: "Shin'ai naru mono he" (Japanese: 親愛なる者へ)	December 18, 2010	February 28, 2010 (Canada); March 20, 2010 (USA)
With the BT System fully armed, the Resistance and Spectra head to New Vestroia to initiate a mass evacuation. Many Bakugan are sent to Marucho's house on Earth including the Resistance's. However, Drago decides to remain behind to ensure that everyone has been rescued, remarking how many lives have been lost to protect New Vestroia. Helios chases after Drago, refusing to allow Drago throw away his life while there is still a score to settle. Drago and Helios agree to destroy the BT System themselves, however, their combined powers are not enough. So, in a last attempt, Drago lifts the BT System from the ground and lifts it up to the atmosphere. Just as the BT System detonates, Drago hears Wavern's voice telling him to not give up and that he cannot die yet. Drago, given new determination, absorbs the attribute energies from the BT System and evolves into Helix Dragonoid, his new powers allowing him to easily destroy the BT System. He returns to New Vestroia, greeted happily by everyone excluding Spectra and Helios. Mira questions Spectra on their terms of partnership, but Spectra declares he works alone. Spectra returns to his ship and leaves, but not before Helios declares his continuing rivalry with Drago.
95	43	"Phantom Data Attack" ("To a Lost Future"); Transliteration: "Michi naru mirai he" (Japanese: 未知なる未来へ)	December 25, 2010	March 6, 2010
With the BT System destroyed and New Vestroia safe once more, the Bakugan are all moved back to New Vestroia from Marucho's house. The Bakugan thank the Resistance as they depart for Marucho's house while Klaus remains on Vestal in case the Vexos reveal themselves. Baron, Mira and Ace decided to stay on Earth to train and head to Dan's house for dinner. However, Marucho calls them saying that a strange ghost data has appeared in Bakugan Interspace in the form of unknown Bakugan. Everyone heads into Bakugan Interspace and meet four Bakugan that even Drago doesn't recognize, much to the group's shock. Since the Bakugan refuse to communicate, Baron suggests battling with them. Marucho creates a digital copy of Baron so his challenger, Haos Aranaut, has a partner brawler. The battle does not go so well for Baron, and things get even worse when Aranaut deploys a set of Battle Gear. Aranaut overwhelms defeats Baron and Nemus and destroys the field of Bakugan Interspace. Mira suspects that Spectra may have sent the phantom data, due to Helios' possession of Battle Gear.
96	44	"Spectra's Last Stand" ("Showdown"); Transliteration: "Taiketsu" (Japanese: 対決)	January 8, 2011	March 13, 2010 (Canada); March 27, 2010 (USA)
While wondering where the Bakugan from Bakugan Interspace came from, Mira has just about given up hope on Keith returning to the brother she once knew. Then, Spectra and Helios telepathically contact Dan and Drago to challenge them to one final match to prove they are the best Bakugan team. Drago uses his new powers to locate Spectra and teleport them to his location. The match begins and Drago appears to have the upper hand, that is until Helios whips out his Twin Destructor Battle Gear, which gives Drago a hard time. In their final fight, Drago calls on the power of his friends and defeats Helios. Spectra and Helios admit defeat and admit that Dan and Drago are the best brawlers. Spectra decides to take off his mask and "work with the best rather than against him." Spectra becomes Keith again and Mira hugs him out of joy, happy to have her brother back.
97	45	"Fusion Confusion" ("Figures of Sadness"); Transliteration: "Shiawase no katachi" (Japanese: 幸せのカタチ)	January 15, 2011	March 20, 2010 (Canada); April 3, 2010 (USA)
Keith has easily settled in as the newest member of the Resistance, with the exception of a jealous Ace. Due to the failure of the BT plan, King Zenoheld abuses his son while Mylene tries to stand up for him. However, King Zenoheld rejects her until Hydron places the blame on Professor Clay. As this is occurring, Professor Clay discovers the secrets of the DNA code as well as where the phantom data transmission originated from. Meanwhile, Marucho analyzes the same data, as well as the one Keith received anonymously and discovers they are identical. Keith then suggests constructing Battle Gear for Drago. Drago vehemently opposes at first, feeling it would be wrong being part machine, but Keith assures him that the Battle Gear will be constructed from Drago's own DNA. This fact combined with the lasting Vexos threat changes Drago's opinion, but must undergo a battle to test the virtual prototype. They enter Bakugan Interspace and Keith volunteers to use Ventus Hawktor and Subterra Coredem to battle Dan and Drago, donning his mask and Spectra identity once again. When Dan equips the gear, JetKor, Drago struggles with it as his body rejects the DNA-incompatible equipment. However, Drago continues to push forward and wins the battle, but nearly passes out due to the amount of power needed to control JetKor. Fortunately, enough data was gathered to construct Battle Gear that would not harm Drago's body. Shun and the other brawlers hope that Keith finishes Drago's battle gear before King Zenoheld and the Vexos do. The episode ends with Professor Clay telling King Zenoheld he has begun making the ultimate weapon to use against the brawlers, with King Zenoheld giving his approval.
98	46	"Volt's Revolt" ("Hero of the Wind"); Transliteration: "Hangyaku no hīrō" (Japanese: 反逆のヒーロー)	January 22, 2011	March 27, 2010 (Canada); April 10, 2010 (USA)
Keith, Marucho and Mira work on constructing Drago's Battle Gear, but Keith notices that Mira is distracted. Mira admits that she wishes their father would come around like Keith did so they could be a family again. Keith doubts their father will change his mind but offers Gus's robotic bee to his sister to contact him anyway. Mira does so and asks him to change sides, but Dr. Clay angrily refuses, disavowing his children. Meanwhile, King Zenoheld changes his plan to destroy any living thing that stands in his way. Volt finds this plan goes too far and leaves the Vexos to return home while Mylene wishes him luck. However, his home is no longer what it used to be. Volt meets some children who still see him as their hero despite the things he did as a member of the Vexos and even promises to teach them how to brawl. As the children leave, Prince Hydron appears and a battle quickly follows and Volt easily takes the victory. Hydron is furious and throws a grenade that opens a dimensional hole beneath Volt, sending him into a far dimension. As Volt sinks into the portal, he vows that Hydron will get what's coming to him for all the suffering he has caused innocent people. While JetKor has successfully been completed, King Zenoheld is glad to hear that Volt has been taken care of, he warns the others that they will suffer the same fate if they cross him.
99	47	"Payback" ("To Say Goodbye"); Transliteration: "Sayonara wo surutameni" (Japanese: さよならをするために)	January 29, 2011	April 4, 2010 (Canada); April 17, 2010 (USA)
While the Resistance celebrate the success with Drago's Battle Gear, the Vexos prepare their plans for planetary domination. In the midst of everything, Lync remembers how nice Alice was to him and worries that she may be one of the casualties, so he copies the data for the Alternative System and heads to Moscow to give it to Alice. At first he hesitates, fearing that she may still be mad at him, but before he can make another move, Hydron appears and vows to destroy Lync. During the battle, Hydron implies that he wishes to leave the Vexos as well but since he feels they all do not have a choice, he is infuriated that Lync would leave anyway. Despite putting up a good fight, Lync is defeated and suffers the same fate as Volt. Before being completely dragged into the warp hole, Lync throws his glove at a cackling Hydron. After finishing cooking, Alice heads to find her grandfather and sees the aftermath, finding Lync's glove with the memory card. Alice gives the chip to her grandfather who insists they must show it to Dan and the others. When Keith asks how Alice found the data, she replied that Lync must have left it for her, but sadly adds that he may not be alive. Though the data suggests the Vexos Alternative System is incomplete, Keith states they will require the Bakugan DNA and Battle Gear data that they currently have, making them target for the Vexos once more.
100	48	"Mylene's Meltdown" ("A Fellow Traveler"); Transliteration: "Michidure" (Japanese: みちづれ)	February 5, 2011	April 11, 2010 (Canada); April 24, 2010 (USA)
King Zenoheld sends Mylene and Shadow Prove to collect the Brawlers' Battle Gear and Bakugan DNA Data so with the data the Alternative could be finished faster. Having followed Billy to Marucho's house prior, Mylene and Shadow have the exact location of the hiding place. Once they arrive, they are ambushed by the Resistance, but Mylene takes Mira hostage. Keith quickly agrees to give them the data in exchange for Mira, but instead he leads them into Bakugan Interspace. Despite Mira's attempts to change Mylene and Shadow's mind, a battle quickly follows between the four. Shadow is quickly and effortlessly defeated by Keith and MAC Spider is destroyed in the process. Mira soon defeats Mylene and destroys Macubass. Keith offers Mylene a place in the Resistance but she bitterly rejects and throws one of Hydron's grenades. However, it results in a portal opening in Bakugan Interspace causing it to collapse, causing Interspace to begin to shut down with the four of them still inside.
101	49	"An Heir to Spare" ("Hit the Dutchman"); Transliteration: "Jingi naki tatakai" (Japanese: 仁義なき戦い)	February 12, 2011	April 18, 2010 (Canada); May 1, 2010 (USA)
With Bakugan Interspace beginning to collapse on itself, Mira and Keith attempt to save their Vexos opponents, despite Mylene's wish to die rather than face dishonor. Before she can change her mind, she and Shadow fall into the Death Ball's portal while Mira and Keith are extracted from Bakugan Interspace safely. Meanwhile, King Zenoheld learns of Mylene and Shadow's fall and blames their loss, as well as the Resistance obtaining the Alternative data, on his son Prince Hydron, whom he has tortured as a result. Later that night, Hydron has a dream in which Volt and Lync appear to him and tell him to take down his father and take the throne for himself. Though frightened by the dream, it motivates him to fight against his father. Meanwhile, Zenoheld's Bakugan Farbros has been repaired and synchronized with the Alternative System. Hearing this, Hydron challenges his father. Though Hydron manages to win the first round, he is no match for Zenoheld's Assail Farbos. He loses and Zenoheld admits that they were never meant to be father and son and has Hydron imprisoned. While in his cell, the apparitions of Volt and Lync reappear telling him to overthrow Zenoheld. Hydron shouts he will defeat his father, while Gus, presumed to have been killed during his battle with Zenoheld, listens from another cell and smiles.
102	50	"Ultimate Weapon" ("Ultimate Weapon"); Transliteration: "Saishū heiki" (Japanese: 最終兵器)	February 19, 2011	April 25, 2010 (Canada); May 8, 2010 (USA)
While imprisoned, Hydron discovers Gus is still alive, much to his shock. Meanwhile, Runo, Julie and Mira prepare a cake for Keith to officially celebrate him joining the Resistance. However, Keith's mind lingers elsewhere, something that Mira notices but Keith brushes off. Dan suggests that instead of waiting for Zenoheld's attack, they storm the palace. Keith, however, is too impatient and takes his ship to the Mother Palace on his own. A battle quickly ensues and Gus senses Spectra, so he tricks Hydron into battling so their Bakugan could free them from their cells. When Zenoheld corners Spectra, Gus arrives and joins the battle, giving them the upper hand against the king. Partway through the battle, Professor Clay informs Zenoheld that the Alternative System is complete and targets Spectra and Helios for a test fire. The blast, originating from a colossal airship modeled partially after Farbros, takes a huge chunk out of a small planetoid, with Spectra and Gus just barely escaping the impact. Farbros links with the Alternative System and King Zenoheld declares his quest for intergalactic domination.
103	51	"All for One" ("Day of the Battle"); Transliteration: "Kessen no hi" (Japanese: 決戦の日)	February 26, 2011	May 2, 2010 (Canada); May 15, 2010 (USA)
With Keith having gone to the palace and having no way to find said palace, the Resistance are stuck. Luckily Alice and Dr. Michael arrive and use the teleportation signature left behind by Shadow and Mylene to backtrack to the palace. Meanwhile, Zenoheld continues his attack, forcing Spectra and Gus to retreat and come up with a plan of counterattack. The Resistance are saddened to hear that Tigrerra and Gorem do not wish to participate on the assault of the palace, as they feel they have reached their limits and would only result in putting Runo and Julie in danger. Therefore the Resistance, minus Runo, Julie and Alice, depart on their own, arriving to see Helios and Vulcan in trouble. However, the Alternative is far more powerful than any of them could have ever imagined, resulting in the group being slowly overwhelmed. Keith realizes that because Professor Clay built the Alternative, that he must be inside and asks Mira if she wants to confront him, which she does. Keith uses a new Battle Gear, the "Zukanator", on Helios, to blow a hole in the Alternative that he and Mira use to enter the machine.
104	52	"Final Fury" ("Super! Strongest! Warriors"); Transliteration: "Chou! Saikyou! Uōriāzu" (Japanese: 超！最強！ウォーリアーズ)	March 5, 2011	May 9, 2010 (Canada); May 22, 2010 (USA)
With the battle against the Alternative pressing on, Hydron shows up to lend a hand. Meanwhile, Professor Clay receives a video transmission from a faraway world just as Mira and Keith arrive to make one final appeal. Once the brawlers realize Mira and Keith are missing, they deduce that the siblings may have found a way inside, so Dan uses JetKor to blast a hole in the Alternative while Gus and Marucho stay behind to guard the rear. Gus and Vulcan are nearly defeated, but Hydron steps in and saves him as repayment for breaking them both out of prison. Shun, having memorized the blueprints of the machine, leads the Dan, Ace, and Baron through the Alternative. However, the four are all caught in a trap resembling Bakugan Interspace, where they are forced to battle against four mysterious Bakugan who are unfamiliar by Drago. While Mira pleads with her father to abandon his evil plans, Dan and the others emerge victorious and destroy the main reactor. As everyone evacuates, Professor Clay saves Mira from falling debris but is trapped on the ship with no hope of escaping. He soon returns to his computer and finds that the video he received depicts Bakugan at war. Meanwhile, Hydron captures his father, forcing them both to "go down with the ship." The Alternative explodes, killing them both, as well as Professor Clay. After the battle, the Resistance go their separate ways, with Dan, Shun, and Marucho saying goodbye to their Vestal teammates and allies. Three weeks later, Marucho has completely repaired Bakugan Interspace and prepares to uses Akwimos to test it, while Shun uses Hawktor, and Dan sticks with Drago. Just as the three are about to begin, they are approached by mysterious young man who asks them if they're the Brawlers.
