= Margaret Cavendish, Duchess of Newcastle-upon-Tyne =

English poet and philosopher (1623–1673)

Her Grace The Duchess of Newcastle-upon-Tyne
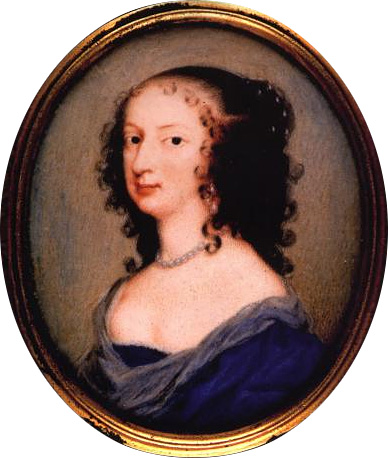
- Born: Margaret Lucas; 1623; Colchester, Essex, England
- Died: 16 December 1673 (aged 49–50); London, England
- Buried: 7 January 1674; Westminster Abbey
- Spouse: William Cavendish, 1st Duke of Newcastle
- Father: Sir Thomas Lucas
- Occupation: Natural philosopher, author

Margaret Cavendish, Duchess of Newcastle-upon-Tyne (née Lucas; 1623 – 16 December 1673) was an English natural philosopher, poet, fiction writer, and playwright. She was a prolific writer, publishing over a dozen original texts under her name at a time when women were largely excluded from publishing. Cavendish was a materialist, creating her doctrine of complete blending that established three kinds of matter that make up nature: rational animate matter, sensitive animate matter, and inanimate matter. She also rejected dualism, arguing that the mind and body are connected, with the mind being corporeal as it resides within the body.

Although many would credit author Mary Shelley as the inventor of science fiction, Margaret Cavendish can also be counted as an essential pioneer. Her book The Blazing World is one of the first to fall into the science fiction genre. As a well-connected natural philosopher, Cavendish engaged with some of the most influential minds of her time, including René Descartes, Thomas Hobbes, and Henry More.

== Background ==
Born Margaret Lucas to Sir Thomas Lucas (1573–1625) and Elizabeth Leighton (died 1647), she was the youngest child of the family. She had four sisters and three brothers, the royalists Sir John Lucas, Sir Thomas Lucas and Sir Charles Lucas, who owned the manor of St John's Abbey, Colchester. As a teenager, she became an attendant on Queen Henrietta Maria and travelled with her into exile in France, living for a time at the court of the young King Louis XIV. She became the second wife of William Cavendish, 1st Duke of Newcastle-upon-Tyne in 1645.

Her husband, the marquess William Cavendish, 1st Duke of Newcastle, was a Royalist commander in Northern England during the First English Civil War and in 1644 went into voluntary exile in France. Margaret accompanied him and remained abroad until the Stuart Restoration in 1660.

== Writings ==
Cavendish, as a poet, philosopher, writer of prose romances, essayist, and playwright, published under her name at a time when most women writers remained anonymous. Her topics included gender, power, manners, scientific method, and philosophy. Cavendish's first work, Poem and Franceis (1653), she began to develop her interest in natural philosophy, considered as science in present day.Her utopian romance The Blazing World is one of the earliest examples of science fiction. She was unusual in her time for publishing extensively in natural philosophy and early modern science, producing over a dozen original works; with her revised works the total came to 21. She often would have her portrait engraved on the covers of her works so that people would know that she was solely responsible for the creation of whatever she wrote and then published in some way or another.

Cavendish has been championed and criticised as a unique, ground-breaking writer. She rejected the Aristotelianism and mechanical philosophy of the 17th century, preferring a vitalist model. In May 1667, she became the first woman to attend a meeting at the Royal Society of London, criticising and engaging with members and philosophers such as Robert Boyle.

Cavendish's publications brought her fame and helped to disprove the contemporary belief that women were inherently inferior to men. Cavendish used them to advocate women's education: women were capable of learning and benefiting from education, and she insisted her own works would have been better still if, like her brothers, she had been able to attend school.

=== Views on animals ===
Animals and the relationship between humans and other creatures recur in Cavendish's poetry and natural philosophy. She rejected René Descartes's account of non-human animals as mindless automata. In her natural philosophy, all parts of nature were composed partly of self-moving matter and therefore possessed some form of perception and knowledge. Cavendish consequently attributed knowledge not only to humans and other animals, but also to plants and minerals. She maintained that different creatures possessed different kinds of knowledge, asking, for example, whether fish might know more about water, birds about the air, and worms about the earth than humans did. Although she regarded humans as possessing a wider range of knowledge because of their bodily form, experience and use of language, she did not regard reason or perception as exclusively human capacities.

Cavendish addressed human treatment of animals most directly in Poems and Fancies (1653). "The Hunting of the Hare" and "The Hunting of the Stag" describe hunts from the perspective of the pursued animals, including their fear and suffering. In the former, she gives the hare the name "Wat" and describes the hunters' celebration of his death before accusing humans of believing that other creatures were made for them to "Tyrannize upon". Mihoko Suzuki interprets the poems as presenting hunted animals as individual subjects and exposing hunting as gratuitous violence. She argues that Cavendish's use of the language of tyranny gives her criticism of human domination over animals a political dimension. Cavendish also wrote elsewhere of animals as possessing their own forms of knowledge, and in "A Morall Discourse betwixt Man, and Beast" compared human abilities with those of other species while criticising the power humans exercised "To kill, to spoile, or else alive to take".

Cavendish also questioned the killing of animals for food. In Poems and Fancies, she criticised the assumption that God had given animals life and sensation merely for humans to eat, while in Grounds of Natural Philosophy she imagined animals and humans subsisting on fruits, herbs, milk and eggs rather than destroying an entire living creature. Roger Maioli describes these passages as recurring defences of vegetarianism and connects them to Cavendish's rejection of human centrality and her account of non-human cognition. Deborah Boyle offers a narrower interpretation, noting that Cavendish herself ate meat and arguing that she did not regard eating animals as inherently wrong. According to Boyle, her objections concerned excessive, wasteful or prideful uses of animals rather than their use for food itself.

Scholars have differed over how far these writings constitute an objection to the human use of animals. Boyle argues that Cavendish accepted that animals could legitimately be used by humans and objected instead to uses that were wasteful, excessively violent or motivated by human pride. Cavendish was not a vegetarian and referred in her autobiography to eating chicken. Although some of her works criticise killing large numbers of animals for feasts and portray birds objecting to being killed and eaten, Boyle argues that Cavendish did not regard eating animals as inherently wrong. Boyle similarly interprets the hunting poems as objections to the spectacle, waste and pride associated with hunting rather than to all killing of animals.

Cavendish has also been described as an early opponent of animal experimentation, partly because she wrote that she allowed butterflies to emerge naturally from their cocoons rather than opening them prematurely and risking their deaths. Boyle disputes interpreting this as a general opposition to animal experimentation. Cavendish discussed contemporary experiments involving the transfusion of blood between animals and humans without objecting to the use or killing of animals involved. Boyle argues that Cavendish's concern in the example of the butterflies was interference with the regular course of nature rather than animal experimentation itself, and concludes that she should not be characterised as a proto-animal-welfarist.

== Early years ==
=== Childhood ===
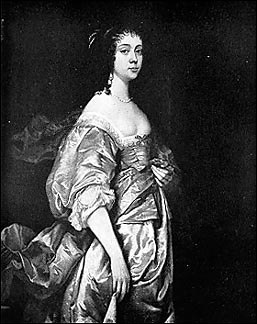
Mary Lucas, older sister of Margaret Cavendish

Cavendish's father, Thomas Lucas, was exiled after a duel that led to the death of "one Mr. Brooks", but pardoned by King James. He returned to England in 1603. As the youngest of eight, Cavendish recorded spending a lot of time with her siblings, including Sir Thomas Lucas, Sir John Lucas, Mary Lucas, Elizabeth Lucas, Sir Charles Lucas, Ann Lucas and Catherine Lucas. She had no formal education but had access to libraries and tutors, studied music, dancing and needlework. Although, she hinted that the children paid little heed to tutors, who were "rather for formality than benefit". Cavendish began putting ideas down on paper at an early age, although it was poorly accepted for women to display such intelligence at the time and she kept her efforts in the privacy of her home. The family had significant means and Cavendish stated that her widowed mother chose to keep her family in a condition "not much lower" than when her father was alive; the children had access to "honest pleasures and harmless delights". Her mother had little to no male help.

=== Lady-in-waiting ===
When Queen Henrietta Maria was in Oxford, she heard "the Queen had not the same number [of maids of honor] she was used to have", so Cavendish persuaded her Mother to let her go, stating, "I wooed and won my Mother to let me go" (p. 373). She accompanied the Queen into exile in France, away from her family for the first time. She notes that while she was confident in her siblings' company, she became bashful amongst strangers. She was fearful she might speak or act inappropriately without her siblings' guidance, and with this, she carried anxiety about being well-received and well-liked. Due to this, she spoke only when necessary and so came to be regarded as a fool, which Cavendish stated that she preferred to being seen as wanton or rude. Regretting that she had left home to be a lady-in-waiting, Cavendish informed her mother that she wanted to leave the court, but her mother persuaded her not to disgrace herself by leaving and provided her with funds that Cavendish noted quite exceeded the normal means of a courtier. She remained a lady-in-waiting for two more years before marrying William Cavendish in 1645, then still Marquess of Newcastle.

=== Marriage to the Marquess ===
Cavendish noted that her husband liked her bashfulness; he was the only man she was ever in love with, not for his title, wealth, or power, but for merit, justice, gratitude, duty, and fidelity. She saw these as attributes that held people together even in misfortune, and in their case helped them to endure suffering for their political allegiance. Cavendish had no children, despite efforts by her physician to help her conceive. Her husband had five surviving children from a previous marriage, two of whom, Jane and Elizabeth, wrote a comic play, The Concealed Fancies.

Cavendish later wrote a biography of her husband: The Life of the Thrice Noble, High and Puissant Prince William Cavendish. In her dedication, Cavendish recalls a time when rumours surrounded the authorship of her works: that her husband wrote them. Cavendish notes that her husband defended her from these but admits to a creative relationship, even as her writing tutor, for writing "fashions an image of a husband and wife who rely on each other in the public realm of print."

== Personal life ==
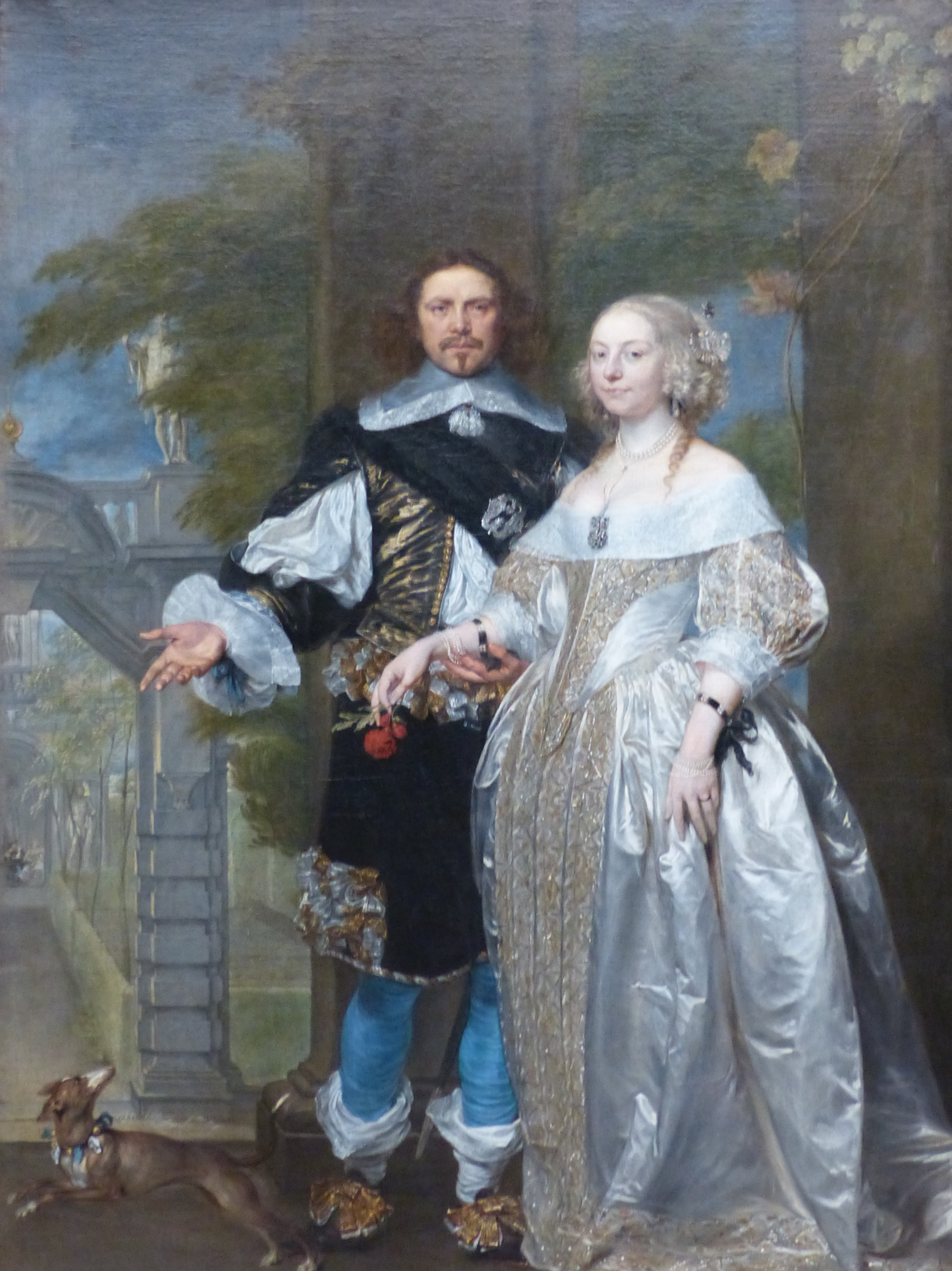
Margaret Cavendish and her husband, William Cavendish, 1st Duke of Newcastle-upon-Tyne

=== Health ===
Cavendish stated in A True Relation of My Birth, Breeding, and Life that her bashful nature, which she described as "melancholia", made her "repent my going from home to see the World abroad." It manifested itself in reluctance to discuss her work in public, but this she satirised in her writing. Cavendish defined and sought self-cures for the physical manifestations of her melancholia, which included "chill paleness", inability to speak, and erratic gestures.

=== Religious beliefs ===
Cavendish's views on God and religion remained ambiguous. Her writings show her as a Christian, but she did not often address the matter. In her Physical Opinions, she explicitly stated her belief in the existence of God – "Pray account me not an Atheist, but believe as I do in God Almighty," – but sought to split philosophy from theology and so avoid debating God's actions in many of her philosophical works.

Her theological temerity was unusual at a time when much of women's writing was built around religion. Although Cavendish acknowledged God's existence, she held "that natural reason cannot perceive or have an idea of an immaterial being." So "when we name God, we name an Inexpressible, and Incomprehensible Being." Still, she believed that all parts of nature have an innate knowledge of God's existence. Even inanimate matter, she argues, "also have an interior, fixt and innate knowledge of the existence of God, as, that he is to be adored and worshipped. And thus the inanimate part may, after its own manner, worship and adore God."

=== Fashion and fame ===
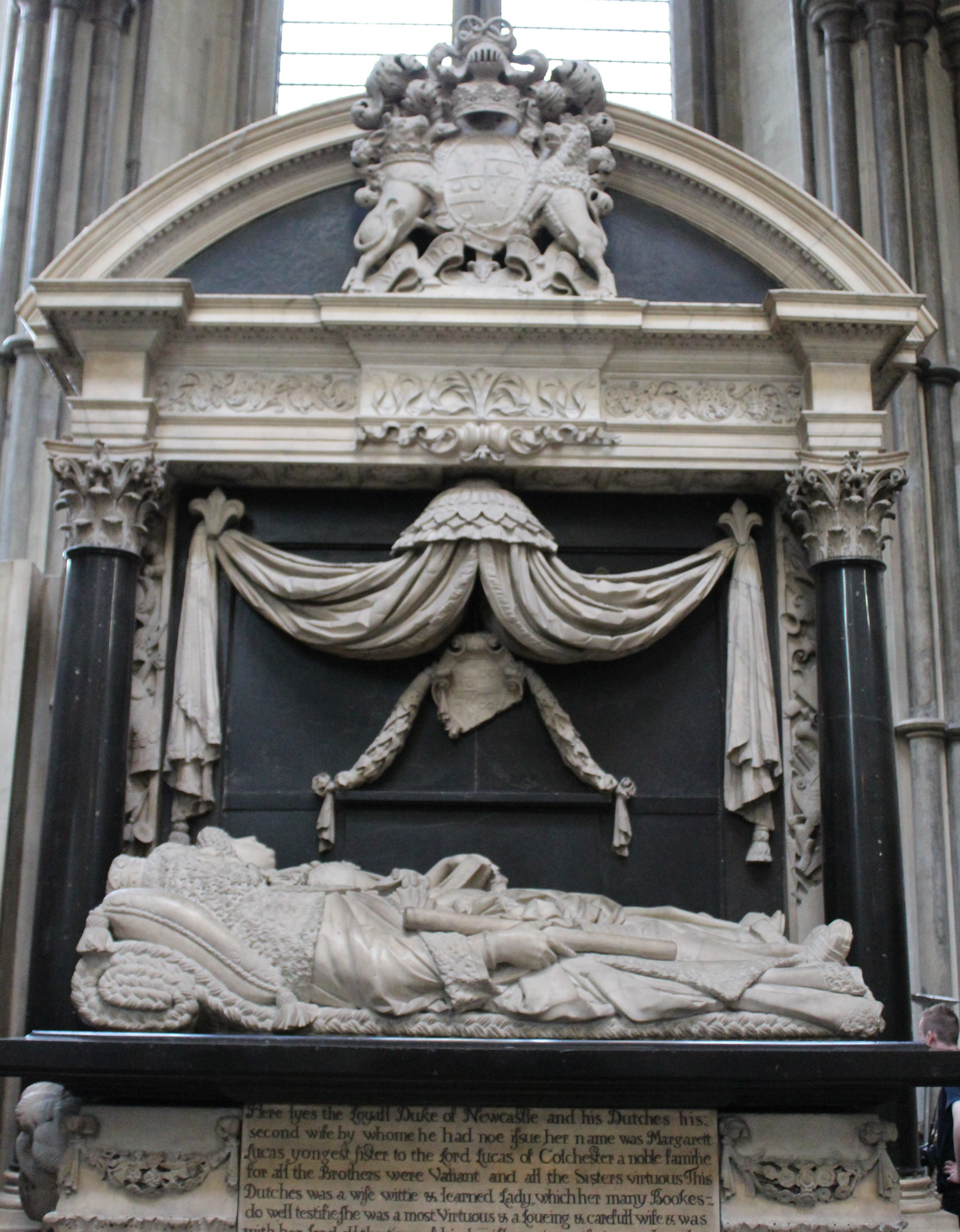
Monument to William & Margaret Cavendish, Westminster Abbey

Cavendish, in her memoir, explained her enjoyment in reinventing herself through fashion. She said she aimed at uniqueness in dress, thoughts, and behaviour and disliked wearing the same fashions as other women. She also made her desire for fame public. Several passages remark on her virtuous character: while acknowledging the goodness in others, she thought it acceptable to hope to better them and even achieve everlasting fame.

She expected to be criticized for deciding to write a memoir but retorted that it was written for herself, not for delight, to give later generations a true account of her lineage and life. She noted that others, such as Caesar and Ovid, had done the same.

=== Financial problems ===
A few years after her marriage, she and her husband's brother, Sir Charles Cavendish, returned to England. Cavendish had heard that her husband's estate, sequestrated due to his being a royalist delinquent, would be sold and that she as his wife could hope to benefit from the sale. In the event, she received no benefit. She noted that while many women petitioned for funds, she herself only did so once and, being denied, decided such efforts were not worth the trouble. After a year and a half, she left England to be with her husband again.

=== Death ===
She died in London and was buried in Westminster Abbey on 7 January 1674. Her husband arranged for a monument, by the sculptor Grinling Gibbons, to be erected in the north transept of the abbey. The epitaph reads: "Her name was Margaret Lucas youngest sister to the Lord Lucas of Colchester, a noble family, for all the brothers were valiant, and all the sisters virtuous." All the Brothers Were Valiant became the title of a novel and number of film adaptations in the early 20th century.

== Major works ==
=== Poems and Fancies (1653) ===
Poems and Fancies encompasses poems, epistles and some prose on topics that include natural philosophy, atoms, nature personified, macro/microcosms, other worlds, death, battle, hunting, love, honour, and fame. Her poems, at times, take a dialogue form between such pairs as earth and darkness, an oak and a tree-cutter, melancholy and mirth, and peace and war. As noted by Mistress Toppe, formerly Elizabeth Chaplain and Cavendish's maid, Cavendish's writings took the form of poetical fiction, moral instruction, philosophical opinion, dialogue, discourses and poetical romances. Poems and Fancies included The Animal Parliament, a prose piece consisting largely of speeches and letters. The collection concludes with her thoughts on her writing and an advertisement for one of her future publications.

==== Authorial intent ====
Cavendish concluded the collection by stating she was aware that she did not write elegantly and that her phrasing and placement of words could be criticised. She said she had difficulty creating rhymes that could communicate her intended meaning. In short, Cavendish stated that she strove for meaning at the expense of elegance, her aim being to communicate ideas. She also noted that she expected her work to be criticised for not being useful, but she wrote not to instruct her readers in the arts, sciences, or divinity, but to pass her time, asserting that she made better use of her time than many others. Cavendish returned to these points in her epistles and poems.

==== Epistle dedicatory ====
Cavendish, like authors such as Aphra Behn and William Wordsworth, stated her intended audience, writing purpose and philosophy in prefaces, prologues, epilogues, and epistles. Her several epistle dedications for Poems and Fancies often sought to justify writing at a time when women writers were not encouraged in terms of subject choice. She instructed readers on how to read and respond to her poetry, most often by inviting praise from supporters and requesting silence from those unaffected by her work. Cavendish commonly used the epistles to admit and excuse potential weaknesses in her writing. They were directed at specific audiences and varied accordingly.

==== Poetry as spinning ====
Looking at several of the epistles in Poems and Fancies, her dedication to Sir Charles Cavendish, her brother-in-law, compares writing poetry to spinning and calls poetry mental spinning – it was commonly thought to be more appropriate for women to spin than to write, but she herself was better at writing. This is one of several occasions when Cavendish calls attention to stereotypical gender roles and expands on her reasons for not following them. Here, Cavendish often employed metaphors to describe her writing in terms of stereotypical feminine tasks or interests, such as spinning, fashion, and motherhood. While criticising her own work, she said it would seem better if Sir Charles Cavendish looked favourably on it. Cavendish often appealed to readers for applause: if it were well received, it would be somewhat improved. She ends by complimenting Charles's charity and generosity.

==== The pursuit of fame ====
In her epistle to noble and worthy ladies and in many others, Cavendish plainly expresses her desire for fame. She was not concerned that the best people should like her writing, as long as many people did. She justified this by linking fame to noise and noise to great numbers of people. Cavendish often assumed a defensive position, here justified by asserting that she expected critiques from males and females not only of her writing, but of her practice of writing itself. Cavendish argued that women who busy themselves writing will not act ineptly or gossip. Though she expected criticism from females, she called for female support in gaining honour and reputation. She ends by stating that if she fails, she will see herself as martyred for the cause of women.

==== Defence of writing and fame ====
In her epistle to Mistress Toppe, Cavendish states a desire for fame as her main reason for writing. Again, she asks for acceptance of her writing as a digression from accepted gender norms. While she often brings in metaphors of domestic or stereotypical feminine activities, here, she tries to excuse her desire for fame by distancing her ambition from what is feminine: her ambition is a quest for glory, perfection, and praise, which she states is not effeminate. Even while writing and pursuing fame, she remained modest and honourable and did nothing to dishonour her family. Cavendish attributed her confidence, as a type of censor, to her belief that there is no evil, only innocence in her desire for fame. As to her writing without permission, Cavendish excuses herself by stating it is easier to get a pardon after the fact than to obtain leave beforehand. She places writing over gossip, as a common and negative female activity. She credits her books as tangible examples of her contemplation and contrasts her self-proclaimed harmless ideas with wild ideas that might lead to indiscreet actions.

Cavendish explored writing closet dramas in her exile. She became one of the best-known women playwrights through her interest in philosophical nature. This epistle is followed by a response from Mistress Toppe, praising Cavendish and her skill in poetical fiction, moral instruction, philosophical opinion, dialogue, discourses, and poetical romances.

==== Language, knowledge and error ====
Cavendish included a prefatory letter to natural philosophers. She knew no language but English, and even her English was somewhat limited since she was familiar only with "that which is most usually spoke." In other words, she downplayed her knowledge of the technical vocabulary used by natural philosophers and, thereby, her knowledge of opinions and discourses that preceded her own. She then dismissed errors she might make as trivial, asserting that she did not mean her text to be taken as truth. She wrote simply to pass the time and expected her work to be read for the same end. This epistle also explained her writing in verse: poets were thought to write fiction and that fiction was aligned with pastime, not truth. So verse might be expected to contain errors. Cavendish lamented that her work was not more entertaining and advised readers to skip any part they did not like.

==== Writing to pass the time ====
Her epistle states that with no children and, at that time, no estate, she has a lot of spare time, which she fills by writing, not housekeeping. Food husbandry in poetry was well-ordered fancy composed of fine language, proper phrases, and significant words. Cavendish excused errors that might be found in her work as due to youth and inexperience, for she wrote only to distract herself from hardships of her husband's and her own. Comparing her book to a child, she said that it was innocent, young, well-behaved, bashful, and sensitive. Readers should blame her, not the book, if they did not like it. If, however, the book was well-liked, she made it clear that she expected fame.

==== Instruction on comprehension and judgement ====
In her epistle to the poets, Cavendish notes that as women seldom wrote, her writing may be ridiculed, as the strange and unusual seem fantastical, the fantastical seems odd, and the odd seems ridiculous. She requests that her work be judged by reason, not prejudice. She then excuses weaknesses in her poetry by stating that she writes only to escape melancholy thoughts and fill idle time. She employs a food/feasting metaphor: her poems are not ripe, but applause and praise will make them pass as a "general feast" to those of vulgar taste who take quantity over quality. As was typical in her writing, applause is welcomed and criticism censored, as she advises those who dislike her poetry to keep silent. Hers are poems of fancy and so require study. She recommends that, as one with a troubled conscience ought to look to a minister for guidance, likewise a reader will ask a poet for help in understanding her poems. Attempting again to guide readers to a positive reception of her book, Cavendish distinguishes poets (able judges of poetry) from rhymers (faulty judges of poetry) and advises people not to call her book nonsense or poorly constructed out of their own ignorance and malice. Returning again to her desire for fame, Cavendish notes that if judged by an honest poet, who would not be envious, her work would receive applause.

Cavendish asks the reader to read her fancies (poems) slowly, paying heed to each word, for each is a fancy itself. She warns that if readers lose their place or skip lines, they will miss the meaning of the entire work.

==== Poems: excuses and instructions ====
Cavendish followed some epistles with poems on how they came to be published and how they should be received. The proximity of the poems to the epistles and their similarity in subject and tone suggests that they may be interpreted as Cavendish's own point of view.

The poem The Poetresses (sic) hasty Resolution, like many of Cavendish's epistles, contains excuses for errors that may be found in the poet's work and begs for praise. The poet states that self-love influences her judgment of her own poetry, which she finds she likes so much that she is moved to continue writing in the hope of fame. She claims to write without thought of how her work would be received by critics. She then recalls how she was visited by Reason, who advised her to stop writing. Reason said her writing was a waste of time, that her work would not be well received, and she should not have her work printed so that the printer would not lose money. Reason also stated that there were already too many books and that she should burn what she had written to spare the world from more. The poet noted her own angry response: she sent her book to the press before she could be persuaded otherwise. In hindsight, however, she regretted doing so: she felt ashamed of her writing and told the reader to pity her and wipe away her tears with praise.

In The Poetresses Petition, she compares a negative reception to her books with their death. If the books suffer such a death (i.e., criticism), she requests silence and that they be forgotten, without alteration or inscriptions, and left undisturbed unless new merit is found. Again, Cavendish sought to censor criticism and promote fame by instructing that only positive criticism should be voiced.

In An Apology for Writing So Much upon This Book, she compares it to a child and the book/child and author/parent to birds. The book is like a baby bird just going out on its own. The author, like a parent bird, is unsure whether the book/baby bird will be safe and chirrups in an attempt to protect it.

=== Nature's Pictures drawn by Fancy's Pencil to the Life (1656) ===
This is viewed as "Cavendish's most ambitious attempt to combine modes and genres." It includes short prose romances – "The Contract" and "Assaulted and Pursued Chastity" – and several prefatory addresses to the reader. The stories concern "the advantageous production of woman as spectacle" and "repeatedly [feminise] the aristocratic and chivalric trope (or figure) of the fair unknown."

=== A True Relation of my Birth, Breeding, and Life (1656) ===
Cavendish published this autobiographical memoir as an addendum to Natures Pictures Drawn by Fancies Pencil to the Life, in 1656. She wrote it at the age of 33, which has been discussed by literary critics. One critic sees Cavendish's autobiography as a way to gain credibility and a marketable image that would undercut a socially improper public image. Cavendish wrote her autobiography in response to what people were saying of her in her lifetime. It relates Cavendish's lineage, social status, fortune, upbringing, education and marriage, describes her pastimes and manners, and offers an account of her personality and ambition, including thoughts on her bashfulness, contemplative nature and writing. She also shares her views on gender (appropriate behaviour and activity), politics (Parliamentarians v. Royalists) and class (proper behaviour of servants).

The memoir details the lives of her family, including a short account of her brother Charles Lucas, one of the best Civil War Cavalier cavalry commanders, executed by the Parliamentarians for treason in the Second English Civil War. She goes on to address the economic and personal hardships that she and her family faced from the war and their political allegiance, such as loss of estates and bereavements.

=== CCXI Sociable Letters (1664) ===
Published in 1664 by William Wilson, CCXI Sociable Letters (1664) is a collection of letters written as if composed by real women. The organisation is similar to that of The World's Olio (1655). The topics are as varied as the forms and length of the letters. They cover marriage, war, politics, medicine, science, English and classical literature, and miscellaneous matters like gambling and religious extremism. Some letters seem to point to characters as actual people – Thomas Hobbes may appear in letter 173 and C. R. stand for King Charles II, – and some are addressed to real people with whom Cavendish often communicated, but most are fictional, leading to a surprisingly vibrant, ongoing conversation and observation of contemporary life.

=== Observations upon Experimental Philosophy (1666) ===
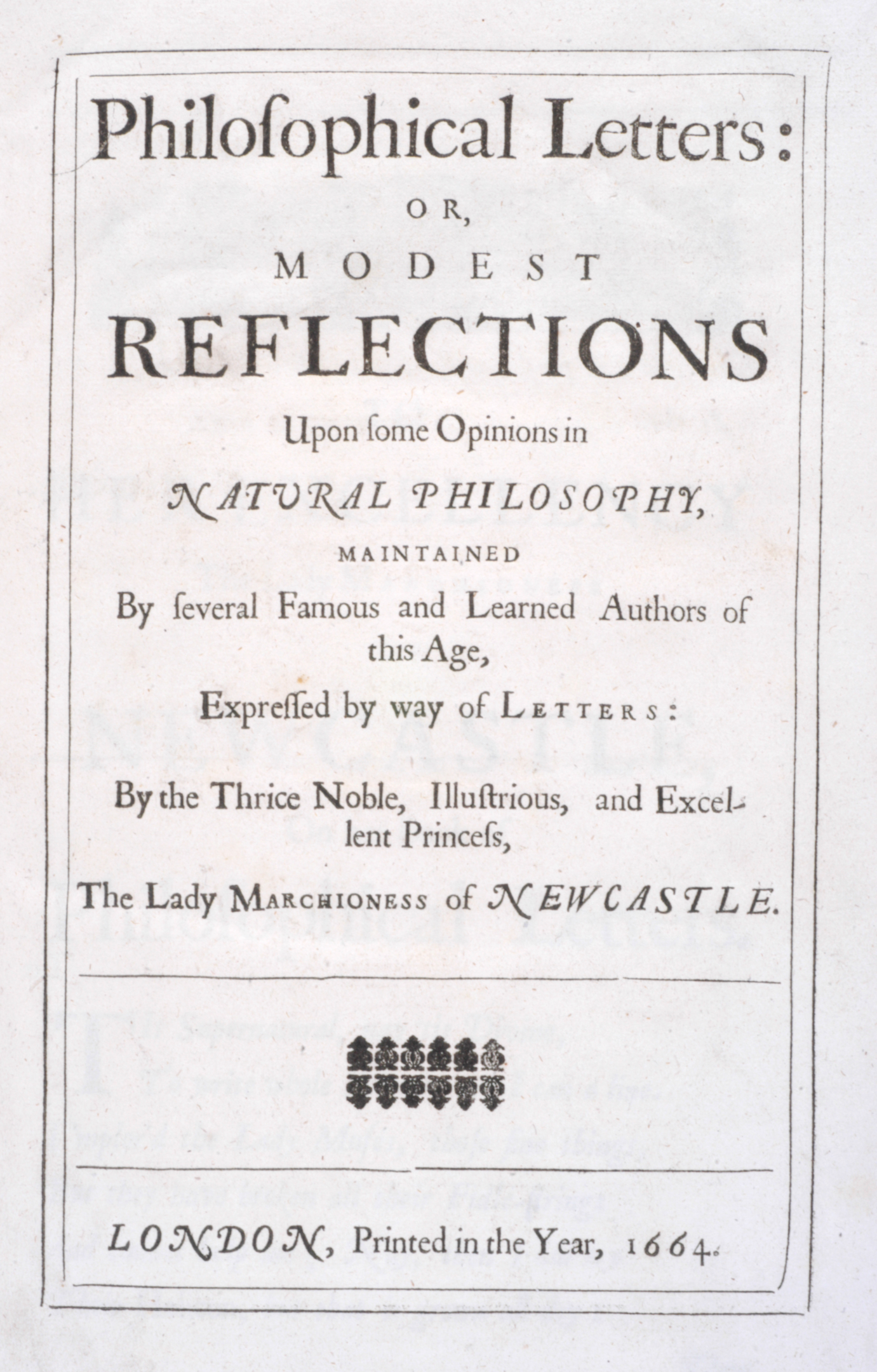
Philosophical letters, 1664

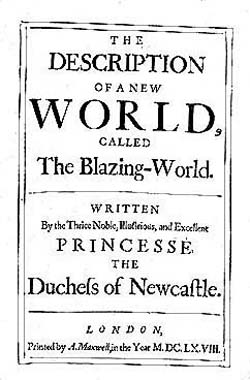
The Blazing World, 1666

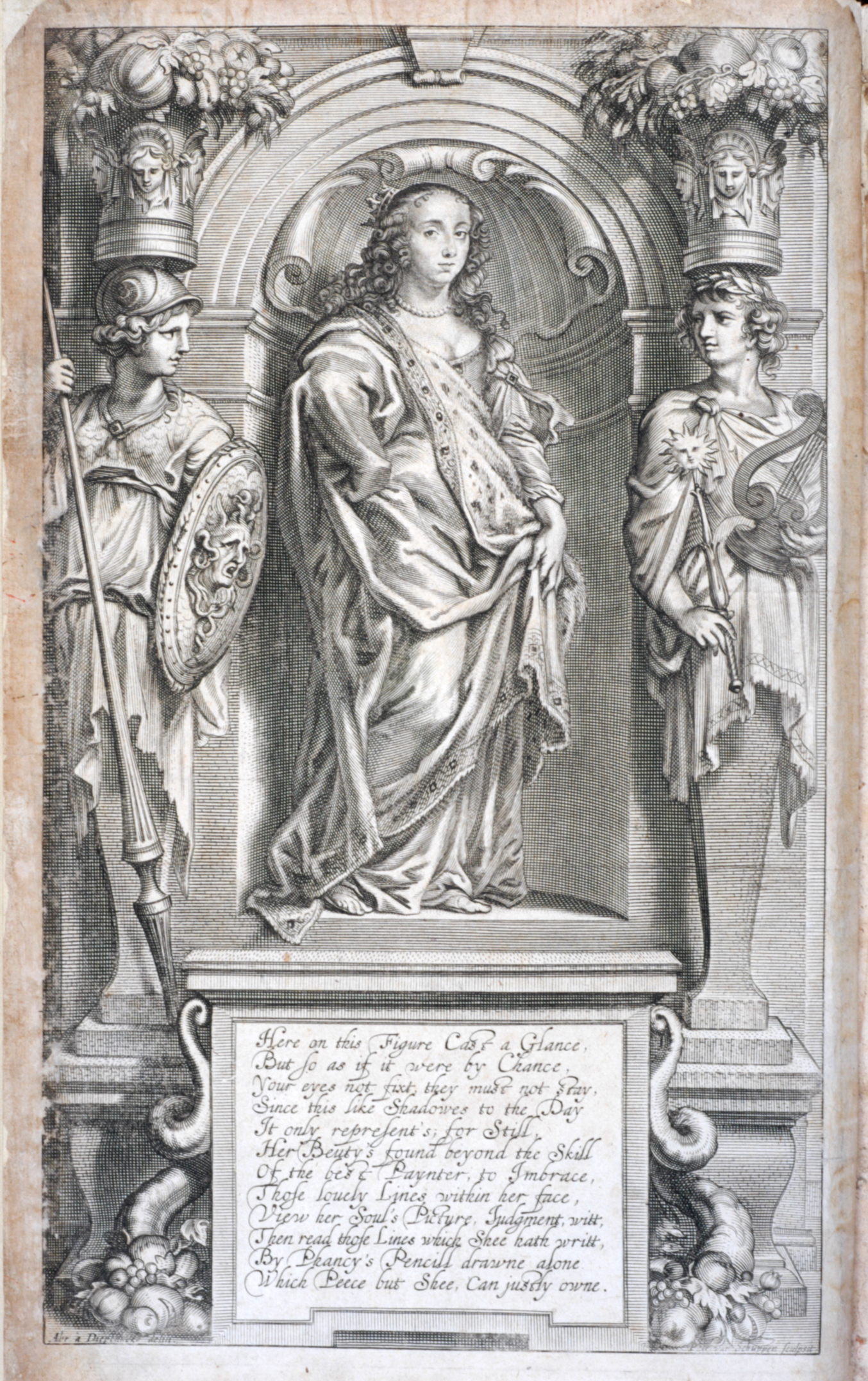
Grounds of Natural Philosophy, 1668, Frontispiece

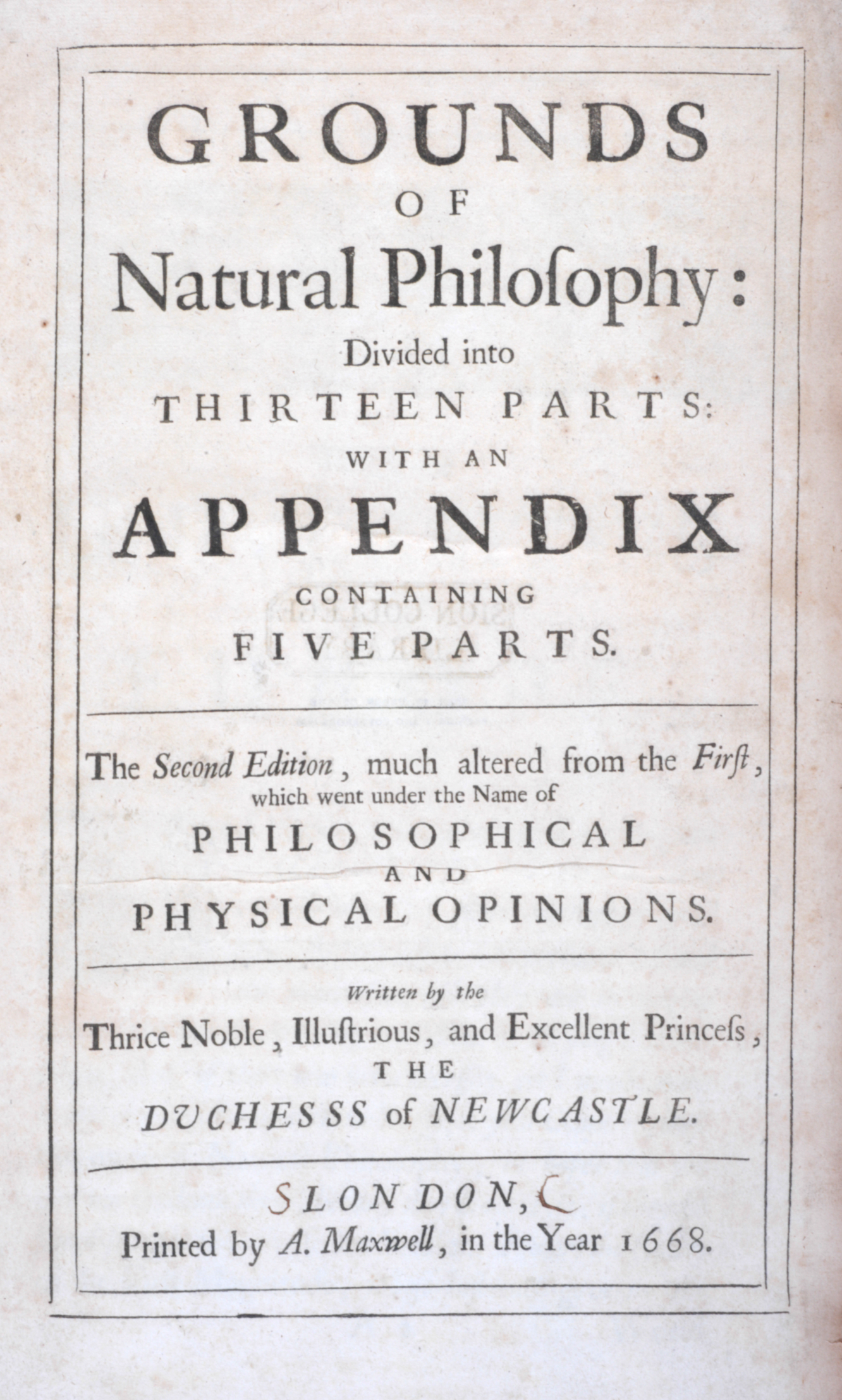
Grounds of Natural Philosophy, 1668, Title page

==== Cavendish's natural philosophy ====
Throughout her work on natural philosophy, Margaret Cavendish defends the belief that all nature is composed of free, self-moving, rational matter. Eileen O'Neill provides an overview of Cavendish's natural philosophy and its critical reception in her introduction to Observations upon Experimental Philosophy. She describes Cavendish's natural philosophy as rejecting Aristotelianism and mechanical philosophy and favouring Stoic doctrines: while women rarely wrote about natural philosophy in the 17th century, Cavendish published six books on the subject. O'Neill points out that Cavendish herself was not formally educated in natural philosophy, though William Cavendish and his brother Charles shared an interest in the subject and supported her interest and study in the area. She may also have been influenced by social encounters with philosophers such as Thomas Hobbes. O'Neill believes Hobbes (who had instructed Charles in philosophy) had marked influence on Cavendish's natural philosophy, making her one of the few 17th-century supporters of Hobbes' materialist philosophy, which argued that incorporeal souls did not exist in nature. Beginning in the 1660s, Cavendish began to study the work of her contemporaries more seriously. O'Neill suggests that such study was meant to enable Cavendish to argue her own points better by contrast with those of other natural philosophers.

O'Neill notes that Cavendish's natural philosophy and her writing in general were criticised by many contemporaries and by more recent readers, such as Pepys, Henry More and Virginia Woolf. Cavendish's work has also received positive criticism and has been lauded by many for tackling typically male-dominated subjects such as natural philosophy. Letters and poems of praise by her husband were included in several of her published works.

==== Writing as an honourable disease ====
Cavendish in her preface to Observations upon Experimental Philosophy states that she expects readers to say that her practice of writing prolifically is a disease. If so, Cavendish stated, many others, including Aristotle, Cicero, Homer and St Augustine, have suffered the same disease. It was an honour for someone of great ambition (as she often identified herself) to share the disease of such wise and eloquent men. In these, as in her other writings, she asserts that she writes for herself and that her writing is a harmless pastime when compared with those of many other women. She contradicts herself, however, by adding that she writes for delight, which she had denied in her previous work. Also somewhat contradictory is her intention of continuing to write even if she has no readers, which belies her desire for fame. Ultimately, Cavendish excuses her criticism of and engagement with the theories of other natural philosophers as a necessary step in the search for truth.

==== Learning versus wit ====
In her epistle to the reader, Cavendish writes that a woman's wit may equal that of a man, and women may be able to learn as easily as men. She argues that wit is natural, whereas learning is artificial, and in her time, men have more chance of educating themselves than women.

Cavendish remarks on her own experience reading philosophical works: many such works have challenged her understanding with their frequently difficult words and expressions. Thus Cavendish advises writers of philosophy to use language appropriate to less expert readers. She defends this by stating that philosophical terms should ease communication of thoughts. She believes that successful communication is possible in all languages and accuses those who complicate communication (particularly English writers) of aiming for esteem from those who admire writing simply because they do not understand it, without considering that it may be nonsense. In her own work, Cavendish states, she chooses not to use difficult terms, although she adds that she understands such terms. Her stated reason is that she desires her work to be accessible to people regardless of their education. Her aim is to communicate her ideas clearly. She requests that any errors that may be found in her work be overlooked and readers remain focused on her main ideas. Here, as in many epistles, she instructs readers on how to approach her work and requests them to read it fully and withhold criticism until they have done so.

=== The Description of a New World, Called the Blazing World (1666) ===
Cavendish's science-fiction work was published in 1666 and again in 1668, each time with Observations upon Experimental Philosophy.

As many such as Silvia Bowerbank and Sara Mendelson have noted, this early version of science fiction critiques and explores such issues as science, gender and power. It also views relations between imagination and reason and philosophy and fiction. Cavendish writes herself into the book, which details a fictional, quite separate new world and its empress. She remarks in her epilogue that she is the empress, adding that in much the same way as there was a Charles the First, she would be seen as Margaret the First.

== Plays in 1662 and 1668 ==
Two volumes of Cavendish's dramatic works were printed. Plays (1662), printed by A. Warren (London) includes:

- Loves Adventures
- The Several Wits
- Youths Glory, and Deaths Banquet
- The Lady Contemplation
- Wits Cabal
- The Unnatural Tragedy
- The Public Wooing
- The Matrimonial Trouble
- Nature's Three Daughters, Beauty, Love and Wit
- The Religious
- The Comical Hash
- Bell in Campo
- A Comedy of the Apocryphal Ladies
- The Female Academy

Plays, Never Before Printed (1668) was published by Anne Maxwell (London):

- The Sociable Companions, or the Female Wits
- The Presence
- Scenes (edited from The Presence)
- The Bridals
- The Convent of Pleasure
- A Piece of a Play

== Other works ==
Cavendish also published collections of Philosophical Letters (1664), orations, as in her collection entitled Orations (1662). Many of her works address such issues as natural philosophy, gender, power and manners. Cavendish's plays were never acted in her lifetime, but a number, including The Convent of Pleasure (1668) have been staged since. The Convent of Pleasure has recently become a staple of high school and university literature courses because of its feminism and Sapphic plot and character elements. Several of Cavendish's works have epistles, prefaces, prologues and epilogues in which she discusses her work, philosophy and ambition, while instructing the reader on how to read and respond to her writing. Her work has been alternately criticised and championed from its original publication to the present day.

== Critical reception ==
Cavendish was an unorthodox and daring intellectual who received positive and negative commentary from her contemporaries. Negative comments can be found by the Royal Society member Samuel Pepys who once wrote of her as "a mad, conceited, ridiculous woman" though he was eager to read her work. Dorothy Osborne reflected in one published letter, after reading a book by the Duchess, that she was "sure there are soberer people in Bedlam." After receiving copies of her work on natural philosophy, Henry More wrote to Anne Conway that Cavendish "may be secure from anyone giving her the trouble of a reply." She also had numerous admirers, Constantijn Huygens, Mildmay Fane, Earl of Westmorland, John Dryden, Kenelm Digby were among them. Joseph Glanvill and Walter Charleton corresponded with her and engaged with philosophy and science. After her death, her husband William Cavendish compiled a book of admiring letters, poems, and epitaphs by numerous people. In the nineteenth century Charles Lamb enjoyed her Sociable Letters and so much admired her biography of her husband that he called it a jewel "for which no casket is rich enough." James Fitzmaurice argues "Cavendish was viewed sympathetically by the English Romantic poets".

Margaret Cavendish was the first person to develop an original theory of atomism in Britain. She was also the first woman to be invited to attend a session of the Royal Society. One member, John Evelyn, saw in Cavendish "a mighty pretender to learning, poetry, and philosophy". Yet her knowledge was recognised by some, such as the protofeminist Bathsua Makin: "The present Dutchess of New-Castle, by her own Genius, rather than any timely Instruction, over-tops many grave Gown-Men." She saw her exemplifying what women could become through education. New manuscript evidence also suggests she was read and taken seriously by at least some early Royal Society members, such as its secretary, Nehemiah Grew.

Cavendish was mostly lost to obscurity in the early twentieth century. Not until Virginia Woolf's The Common Reader (1925) did discourse rediscover the Duchess. Woolf remarked that:

the vast bulk of the Duchess is leavened by a vein of authentic fire. One cannot help following the lure of her erratic and lovable personality as it meanders and twinkles through page after page. There is something noble and Quixotic and high-spirited, as well as crack-brained and bird-witted, about her. Her simplicity is so open; her intelligence so active.

Margaret Cavendish began to generate intense scholarly interest in the 1980s, when rediscovered and analysed from a modern feminist perspective. Since then there have been many book-length critical studies of her. She has also gained fame as one of the first science-fiction writers, with her novel The Blazing World. Her self inserted as a character named Margaret Cavendish in The Blazing World is said to be among the earliest examples of the modern Mary Sue trope. More recently, her plays have been examined in performance studies, for blurring the lines between performance and literature, challenging gender identities and upsetting gender norms. Further analysis on Cavendish appears here.

This new interest has engendered media projects. The film, The Blazing World (2021), is loosely inspired by Cavendish's science fiction story. Siri Hustvedt's The Blazing World (2014), which was also loosely inspired by Cavendish, won The Los Angeles Times Book Prize for Fiction and was long-listed for the Booker Prize. The 2016 book Margaret the First by Danielle Dutton dramatises her "with lucid precision and sharp cuts through narrative time", as a new approach to "imagining the life of a historical woman". As the digital humanities grow, several projects have begun archiving Cavendish. The International Margaret Cavendish Society was set up as "a means of communication between scholars worldwide", to increase awareness of Cavendish's scholarly presence as a hub for newsletters, contacts and links to Cavendish's works. Likewise the Digital Cavendish Project works to make Cavendish's writing accessible and readable for people across the web and "highlight digital research, image archives, scholarly projects, and teaching materials". On 26 January 2018, the Digital Cavendish Twitter account announced that its next goal was to compile the Complete Works of Margaret Cavendish.

== Sources ==
=== Modern Editions of Works by Margaret Cavendish ===
- Bell in Campo and The Sociable Companions. Ed. Alexandra G. Bennett. Peterborough, ON: Broadview Press, 2002.
- Grounds of Natural Philosophy. Ed. Anne Thell. Peterborough, ON: Broadview Press, 2020.
- Margaret Cavendish: Essential Writings. Ed. David Cunning. Oxford: Oxford University Press, 2019.
- Margaret Cavendish: Political Writings. Ed. Susan James. Cambridge: Cambridge University Press, 2003.
- Observations upon Experimental Philosophy. Ed. Eileen O'Neill. New York: Cambridge UP, 2001.
- Observations upon Experimental Philosophy, abridged. Ed. Gwendolyn Marshall. Indianapolis: Hackett Publishing, 2016.
- Paper Bodies: A Margaret Cavendish Reader. Eds. Sylvia Bowerbank and Sara Mendelson. Peterborough, ON: Broadview Press, 2000.
- Philosophical Letters, abridged. Ed. Deborah Boyle. Indianapolis: Hackett Publishing, 2021.
- Poems and Fancies, with the Animal Parliament. Ed. Brandie Siegfried. Iter Press, 2018.
- Sociable Letters. Ed. James Fitzmaurice. Peterborough, ON: Broadview Press, 2004.
- The Description of a New World Called The Blazing World And Other Writings. Ed. Kate Lilley. London: William Pickering, 1992.
- The Convent of Pleasure and Other Plays. Ed. Anne Shaver. Baltimore: The Johns Hopkins Press, 1999.

=== Books ===
- Lisa Walters and Brandie Siegfried, eds. Margaret Cavendish: An Interdisciplinary Perspective. Cambridge: Cambridge University Press, 2022.
- Lisa Hopkins and Tom Rutter. A Companion to the Cavendishes. ARC Humanities Press, 2020.
- David Cunning, Cavendish. Routledge, 2015.
- Lisa Sarasohn, The Natural Philosophy of Margaret Cavendish: Reason and Fancy during the Scientific Revolution. Baltimore, MD: The Johns Hopkins University Press, 2010.
- Lara A. Dodds. The Literary Invention of Margaret Cavendish. Pittsburgh: Duquesne University Press, 2013.
- Anna Battigelli, Margaret Cavendish and the Exiles of the Mind. Lexington: University Press of Kentucky, 1998
- Lisa T. Sarasohn and Brandie R. Siegfried, eds. God and Nature in the Thought of Margaret Cavendish. New York: Routledge, 2014.
- Deborah Boyle, The Well-Ordered Universe: The Philosophy of Margaret Cavendish. New York: Oxford University Press, 2018.
- Lisa Walters, Margaret Cavendish: Gender, Science and Politics. TOC Cambridge: Cambridge University Press, 2014.
- Kate Whitaker, Mad Madge: Margaret Cavendish, Duchess of Newcastle, Royalist, Writer and Romantic. London: Chatto and Windus, 2003 Mad Madge : the extraordinary life of Margaret Cavendish, Duchess of Newcastle, the first woman to live by her pen
- Stephen Clucas, ed., A Princely Brave Woman: Essays on Margaret Cavendish, Duchess of Newcastle. Aldershot: Ashgate, 2003
- Line Cottegnies and Nancy Weitz, eds., Authorial Conquests: Essays on Genre in the Writings of Margaret Cavendish. Cranbury, NJ: Fairleigh Dickinson University Press, 2003
- Douglas Grant, Margaret the First: A Biography of Margaret Cavendish Duchess of Newcastle 1623–1673. London: Rupert Hart-Davis, 1957
- Kathleen Jones, Margaret Cavendish: A Glorious Fame. The life of the Duchess of Newcastle. London: Bloomsbury: ISBN 0-7475-0071-1, 1988
- Emma L. E. Rees, Margaret Cavendish: Gender, Genre, Exile. Manchester: Manchester UP, 2004

=== Articles ===
- N. N. W. Akkerman and M. Corporaal (2004), "Mad Science Beyond Flattery: The Correspondence of Margaret Cavendish and Constantijn Huygens", Early Modern Literary Studies
- Siri Hustvedt. "Afterword: Margaret Cavendish: A Grandmother for Twenty-first Century Philosophy of Science". Margaret Cavendish: An Interdisciplinary Perspective. Eds. Lisa Walters and Brandie R. Siegfried. Cambridge: Cambridge University Press, 2022. 274-288.
- Mihoko Suzuki, "Animals and the political in Lucy Hutchinson and Margaret Cavendish". The Seventeenth Century. 30.2 (2015): 229-247.
- Mihoko Suzuki, "Thinking Beings and Animate Matter: Margaret Cavendish's Challenge to the Early Modern Order of Things". In Challenging Women's Agency and Activism in Early Modernity. Edited by Merry Wiesner-Hanks. Amsterdam: Amsterdam University Press, 2021. 183-206
- Justin Begley, "'The Minde is Matter Moved': Nehemiah Grew on Margaret Cavendish", Intellectual History Review 27, No. 4 (May 2017): 493–514
- Karen Detlefsen, "Atomism, Monism, and Causation in the Natural Philosophy of Margaret Cavendish". Oxford Studies in Early Modern Philosophy, Vol. III, 199–240. Ed. Daniel Garber and Steven Nadler. Oxford: Clarendon Press, 2006
- Karen Detlefsen, "Margaret Cavendish and Thomas Hobbes on Reason, Freedom, and Women". In Feminist Interpretations of Thomas Hobbes, 149–168. Ed. Nancy J. Hirschmann and Joanne H. Wright. University Park: Pennsylvania State University Press, 2012
- Karen Detlefsen, "Margaret Cavendish on the Relation between God and World". Philosophy Compass 4, no. 3 (2009): 421–438
- Karen Detlefsen, "Reason and Freedom: Margaret Cavendish on the Order and Disorder of Nature". Archiv für Geschichte der Philosophie 89, No. 2 (2007): 157–191
- Lara Dodds, "Margaret Cavendish's Domestic Experiment". Genre and Women's Life Writing in Early Modern England. Ed. Michelle M. Dowd and Julie A. Eckerele. Hampshire: Ashgate, 2007. 151–168.
- Deborah Boyle. "Informed by 'Sense and Reason': Margaret Cavendish's Theorizing about Perception". The Senses and the History of Philosophy, ed. Brian R. Glenney and Filipe Pereira da Silva. Routledge, 2019.
- Brandie R. Siegfried and Lisa Walters. "A New Science for a New World: Margaret Cavendish on the Question of Poverty". 1650-1850: Ideas, aesthetics, and inquiries in the early modern era. Eds. Betty Joseph, Elizabeth Sauer, and Kevin L. Cope. Lewisburg, Pennsylvania: Bucknell University Press, 21-36.
- Hilda L. Smith. "'A General War Amongst the Men ... But None Amongst the Women': Political Differences Between Margaret and William Cavendish." Politics and the Political Imagination in Later Stuart Britain: Essays Presented to Lois Green Schwoerer (1997): 143-60.
- Sara Heller Mendelson, "Margaret Cavendish and the Nature of Infinity". Margaret Cavendish: An Interdisciplinary Perspective. Eds. Lisa Walters and Brandie Siegfried. Cambridge: Cambridge University Press, 2022.
- Jeffrey Masten, "Material Cavendish: Paper, Performance, 'Sociable Virginity'". Modern Language Quarterly 65.1 (2004): 49–68
- Elspeth Graham, "Intersubjectivity, Intertextuality, and Form in the Self-Writings of Margaret Cavendish". Genre and Women's Life Writing in Early Modern England. Edited by Michelle M. Dowd and Julie A. Eckerele. Hampshire: Ashgate, 2007. 131–150
- Susan James, "The Philosophical Innovations of Margaret Cavendish". British Journal for the History of Philosophy, Vol. 7, no. 2 (1999): 219–244
- Kegl, Rosemary. "'The World I Have Made': Margaret Cavendish, Feminism, and the Blazing World", Feminist Readings of Early Modern Culture: Emerging Subjects. Edited by Valerie Traub, M. Lindsay Kaplan, and Dympna Callaghan. Cambridge: Cambridge University Press, 1996, pp. 119–141
- James Fitzmaurice, "Fancy and the Family: Self-characterizations of Margaret Cavendish". Huntington Library Quarterly 53.3 (1990): 198–209
- James Fitzmaurice, "Margaret Cavendish on Her Own Writing: Evidence from Revision and Handmade Correction." PBSA 85.3 (1991): 297–308
- Gertrude Townshend Mayer, "Margaret Cavendish Duchess of Newcastle". Women of Letters Vol. 1. London: Richard Bentley & Son, 1894
- Bronwen Price, "Feminine Modes of Knowing and Scientific Inquiry: Margaret Cavendish's Poetry as Case Study". Women and Literature in Britain, 1500–1700. Ed. Helen Wilcox. Cambridge: Cambridge University Press, 1996. 117–142
- Diana Solomon, "Laugh, or Forever Hold Your Peace: Comic Crowd Control in Margaret Cavendish's Dramatic Prologues and Epilogues". Women and Comedy: History, Theory, Practice. Ed. Peter Dickinson, Anne Higgins, Paul Matthew St. Pierre, Diana Solomon and Sean Zwagerman. Lanham, MD: Fairleigh Dickinson UP, 2014. 55–64
- Anne M. Thell, "Meet the hottest early-modern philosopher. No, that's not an oxymoron. Margaret Cavendish's brilliant writing was largely neglected in the 1600s, but it's more relevant than ever. Here's where to start with her work", The Washington Post, June 27, 2023
- Special issue on Margaret Cavendish, In-between: Essays & Studies in Literary Criticism, Vol. 9, 2000
- Special Issue on Margaret Cavendish, Women's Writing, Vol. 4, No.3, 1997
- Jo Wallwork, "Disruptive Behaviour in the Making of Science: Cavendish and the Community of Seventeenth-Century Science". Early Modern Englishwomen Testing Ideas. Ed. Jo Wallwork and Paul Salzman. Surrey: Ashgate, 2011. 41–54
- Clara H. Whitemore, "Margaret Cavendish". Woman's Word in English Fiction: From the Restoration to the Mid-Victorian Period. New York and London: G. P. Putnam's Sons, 1910
- Virginia Woolf, "The Duchess of Newcastle, The Common Reader". The Essays of Virginia Woolf, Volume IV, 1925–1928. Edited by Andrew McNeillie. London: Hogarth Press, 1994. 81–90
