= Carlson Young =

American actress

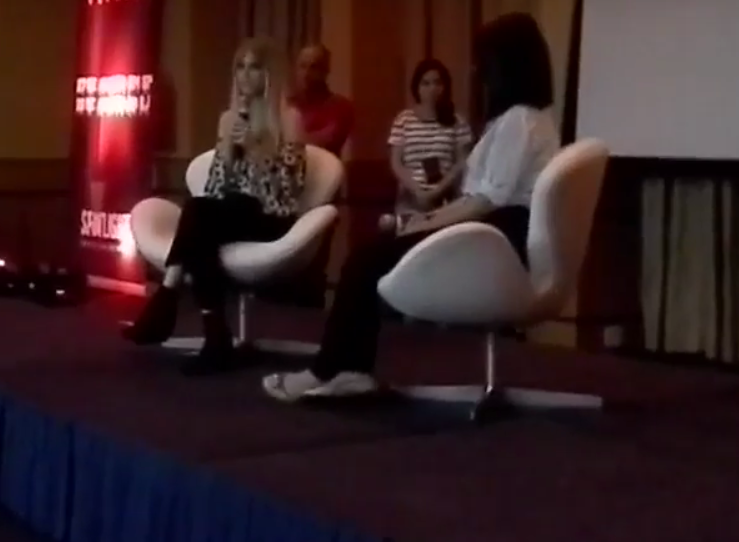
- Born: Fort Worth, Texas, U.S.
- Occupation: Actress
- Years active: 2007–present
- Spouse: Isom Innis (m. 2017)
- Children: 1

Carlson Young is an American actress and director. She is known for directing The Blazing World and Upgraded, and for her acting roles in the American version of Disney Channel's As the Bell Rings, the film Premature, Comedy Central's Key & Peele, and as Brooke Maddox in the first two seasons of the MTV television series Scream.

== Career ==
Young made her directorial debut in 2018 with The Blazing World, a short film inspired by Young's own dreams and the titular work by Margaret Cavendish. In 2020 it was announced that the concept would be turned into a feature-length film, directed by and starring Young, and soundtracked by Isom Innis. In 2021, The Blazing World premiered at the Sundance Film Festival in the NEXT category. Young is set to continue the Saturn Returns trilogy with two subsequent films.

In September 2020, Young directed the music video for "Catch & Release" by Peel (the project of Innis and Sean Cimino).

Young's second film, the rom-com Upgraded, was completed in 2023 and stars Camila Mendes, Marisa Tomei, and Lena Olin. Her next project is the middle school-set fantasy horror film Femina Nox, of which she has written the script and which she may direct.

== Personal life ==
Young is originally from Fort Worth, Texas. She moved to Los Angeles and attended the University of Southern California, where she studied creative writing and enjoyed writing poetry.

In January 2016, Young became engaged to Foster the People member and producer Isom Innis. Innis proposed after he and Young were rescued from a mountain in Iceland. They married in Fort Worth on April 29, 2017, at Saint Andrew's Episcopal Church, which Young attended as a child. On 14 May 2025, Young announced via Instagram that they are expecting their first child, a girl.

== Filmography ==
=== Film ===
Short film

Year	Title	Director	Writer
2018	The Blazing World	Yes	Yes

Feature film

Year	Title	Director	Writer
2021	The Blazing World	Yes	Yes
2024	Upgraded	Yes	No
2025	Trust	Yes	No
2026	The Last Sunrise	Yes	No
2026	Clashing Through the Snow	Yes	No

Acting roles

Year	Title	Role	Notes
2014	Premature	Angela Yearwood	
2015	The Night Is Young	Chair	
2018	The Blazing World	Margaret	Short film
2021	The Blazing World	Margaret Winter	
2021	12 Mighty Orphans	Annie	

=== Television ===
Year	Title	Role	Notes
2007–2009	As the Bell Rings	Tiffany Blake	Main role
2009	Heroes	Cheerleader #5	Episode: "Once Upon a Time in Texas"
2010	Pretty Little Liars	Amber Victorino	Episodes: "Reality Bites Me", "There's No Place Like Homecoming"
2010	True Blood	Tammy	3 episodes
2010	CSI: Crime Scene Investigation	Checker	Episode: "418/427"
2010	The League	Callie / Jaywalking Girl	Episodes: "Kegel the Elf" (uncredited), "The Sacko Bowl"
2011	Big Time Rush	Peggy	Episode: "Big Time Crush"
2011	Traffic Light	Savannah	Episode: "Help Wanted"
2012	Shake It Up	Danika Fitzgerald	Episode: "Embarrass It Up"
2012	Pair of Kings	Chelsea	Episode: "The Oogli Stick"
2012–2013	Key & Peele	Jacquelin	3 episodes
2013	Kroll Show	Herself	Episode: "Secret Room"
2015	Grimm	Selina Golias	Episode: "The Rat King"
2015	CSI: Cyber	Mia Wilcox	Episode: "Shades of Grey"
2015–2016	Scream	Brooke Maddox	Main role (seasons 1–2)
2016	Pickle and Peanut	Footface Girl	Episode: "Bats/Movie Camp Out"
2016	Halloween Wars	Herself (guest judge)	Episode: "Two-Faced"
2020	Emily in Paris	Brooklyn Clark	Episode: "French Ending”

TV movies

Year	Title	Role	Notes
2010	Cutthroat	Rene	
2010	The Dog Who Saved Christmas Vacation	London James	
2011	The Perfect Student	Laura	
2017	A Man for Every Month	Megan	also known as My Favorite Bachelor

Web series

Year	Title	Role	Notes
2011	Wendy	Emily	2 episodes
2016	Last Teenagers of the Apocalypse	Neon	3 episodes
2016	Scream: If I Die	Brooke Maddox	Episode: "Thanks for Seeing the Real Me"

Music video

Year	Title	Artist	Ref.
2013	"Crazy"	Sami	
