= Emma Rees =

Emma Rees may refer to:

- Emma L. E. Rees, British academic
- The Emma Rees case
