= Adam Riegler =

American actor (born 1998)

- Born: May 27, 1998 (age 26); Westport, Connecticut, United States
- Occupation: Actor
- Years active: 2007–present

Adam Riegler (born May 27, 1998) is an American actor.

== Career ==
Riegler's big break in show business was when he played Cubby Bernstein, "Broadway's Tony Award Campaign Manager", in a series of publicity stunts for the Broadway musical Xanadu in 2007.

He is known for appearing in Shrek The Musical as young Shrek in 2008, and as Pugsley Addams in The Addams Family in 2010. Riegler had previously appeared in the 2007 revival of I and Albert.

Other credits include A Tribute to Joseph Stein at the York Theatre and A Christmas Carol at the Westport Country Playhouse.

He was the youngest member of Broadwayspace.com's "30 Under 30: Broadway's Hottest Young Stars" in 2009, and was subsequently the National Ambassador for Kids' Night on Broadway's special 2010 Halloween edition.

Riegler's performance of a monologue written by Nathan Lane and representing The Addams Family was the runner-up in the 2010 Gypsy of the Year Competition.

He plays the role of Arthur in the 2014 IFC film Premature, Neil in The Way Way Back, and Jonah in the 2016 film The Hudson Tribes.

== Credits ==
=== Broadway ===
- The Addams Family
- Shrek the Musical

=== Off-Broadway ===
- I and Albert
- A Tribute to Joseph Stein
- Intervention

=== Regional ===
- David Copperfield
- A Christmas Carol

=== Film/TV ===
- Cubby Bernstein: Tony Campaign Manager
- The Way, Way Back
- Premature
- Fred 3: Camp Fred
- The Hudson Tribes
