= Xanadu (musical) =

American musical comedy

- Broadway poster
- Music: Jeff Lynne; John Farrar
- Lyrics: Jeff Lynne; John Farrar
- Book: Douglas Carter Beane
- Basis: Xanadu by Richard Christian Danus; Marc Reid Rubel
- Productions: 2007 Workshop; 2007 Broadway; 2009 US Tour; 2015 London
- Awards: Outer Critics Circle Award for Best Musical; Drama Desk Award for Best Book

Xanadu is a musical comedy with a book by Douglas Carter Beane and music and lyrics by Jeff Lynne and John Farrar, based on the 1980 film of the same name, which was, in turn, inspired by the 1947 Rita Hayworth film Down to Earth. The title refers to Xanadu, the site of the Mongolian emperor Kublai Khan's summer palace.

The musical opened on Broadway in 2007 and ran for over 500 performances. Unlike the 1980 film, it was generally well-received by critics upon opening. It earned an Outer Critics Circle Award for Best Musical and a Drama Desk Award for Best Book. It was also nominated for Tony Awards for Best Musical and Best Book. The US Tour officially began on December 15, 2009, at the Segerstrom Performing Arts Center.

== Background ==
The 1980 film on which Xanadu is based barely recouped its $20 million production budget at the box office and received uniformly unfavorable reviews, but the soundtrack was a commercial hit, as were several of the songs singularly. Although the film was nominated for six Razzies, winning one for Worst Director, it became a cult classic. Announcements that the film would be adapted as a Broadway show drew skepticism and derision, even from Carter Beane, who adapted the script for the musical.

Novice producer Robert Ahrens, then an assistant at Paramount Pictures, came up with the idea of adapting the film to the stage, and secured the rights to the film and its songs. According to a New York Times article, "he then 'stalked' Douglas Carter Beane, his choice for librettist, until the playwright’s initial no turned to a yes."

According to Beane, in rewriting the script for the musical, he was influenced not only by the 1980 Xanadu film, but also by the 1981 fantasy film Clash of the Titans, prompting him to add the subplot "in which Kira's jealous sister-muses doom her to fall in love with a mortal, incurring the wrath of their father, Zeus". He has noted that the stage musical focuses more on the Greek mythology plotlines but has "a lot of [parody] references to the movie".

The score retains the hits from the film and also includes new arrangements by Eric Stern of "I'm Alive", "Magic", "Suddenly", and "Dancin'", as well as integrating two classic Electric Light Orchestra songs, "Strange Magic" and "Evil Woman", plus Farrar's "Have You Never Been Mellow", a mid-1970s hit for Olivia Newton-John, who starred in the original film.

== Productions ==
=== Workshop productions ===
The musical was first given a workshop production and backers' audition at the Minetta Lane Theatre in Greenwich Village, New York City, in January 2007, featuring performances by Jane Krakowski, Tony Roberts, and Cheyenne Jackson. Readings of the stage version had previously been held on April 21 and August 3, 2006, at New World Stages in Manhattan.

Krakowski and Jackson were cast in their respective leading roles of Clio/Kira and Sonny Malone for the Broadway run, but both eventually dropped out. Jane cited her TV shooting schedule on the NBC show 30 Rock, while Jackson cited post-production commitments for his film Hysteria.

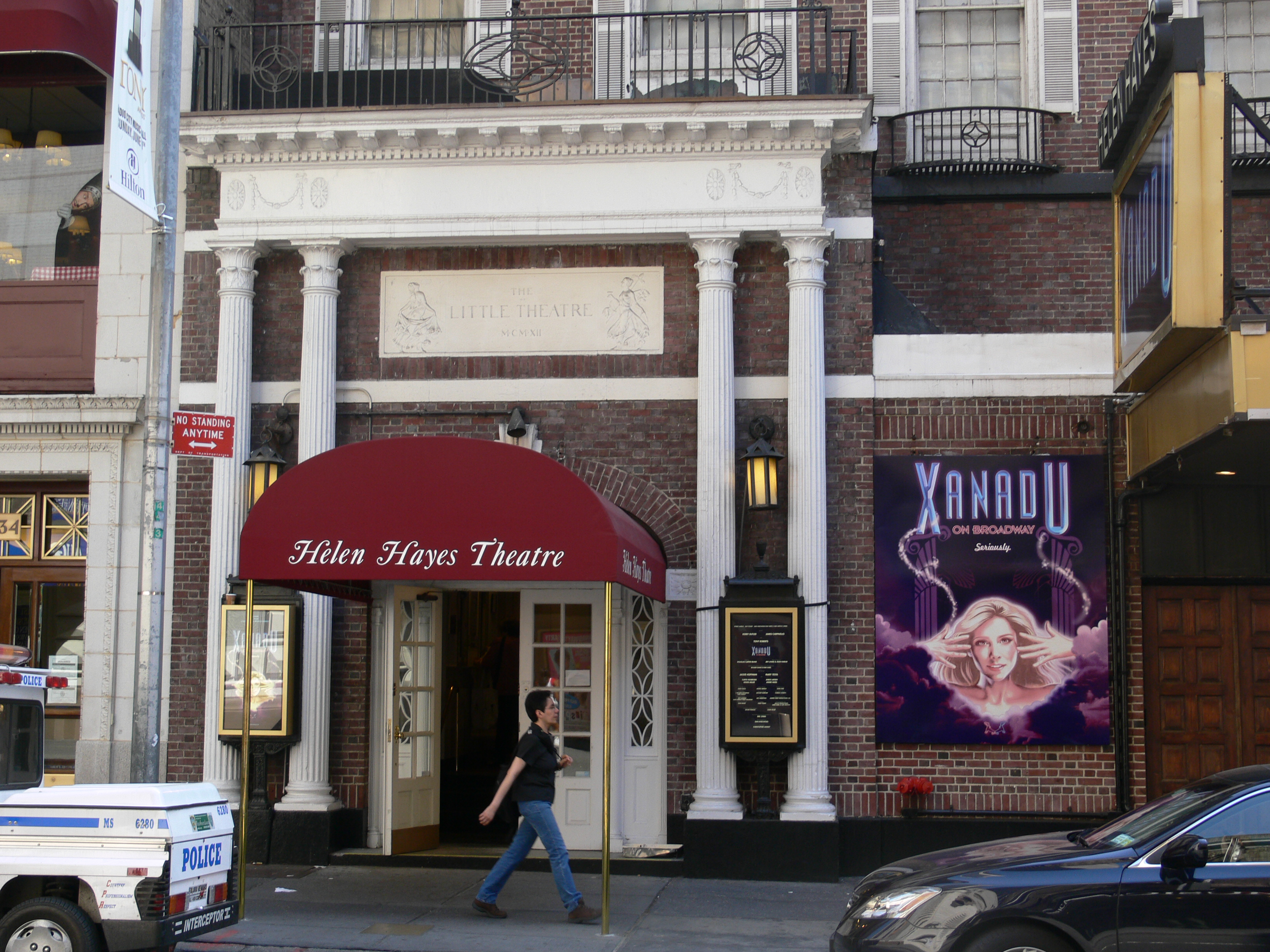
Helen Hayes Theatre showing Xanadu, 2007

=== Broadway production ===
Xanadu began previews on Broadway on May 23, 2007, at the Helen Hayes Theatre and opened on July 10. The production was directed by Christopher Ashley and choreographed by Dan Knechtges, with sets by David Gallo, lighting by Howell Binkley, costumes by David Zinn, sound by T. Richard Fitzgerald and Carl Cassella, and projections by Zachary Borovay. The key producers were Robert Ahrens, Tara Smith, and Brian Swibel.

The production included a considerable amount of skating for the characters Kira and Sonny, and the set extended over the orchestra pit partly into the audience. The show was presented partially in the round, with some audience members seated on benches on the stage. Like several other recent Broadway shows, a small cast was used, and the relatively short show (90 minutes) was played without intermission. James Carpinello was cast as Sonny and played the role during May and June previews. The actor injured his foot rollerskating during a rehearsal on June 12 the same year. Cast members Andre Ward and Curtis Holbrook alternated in the role of Sonny until Carpinello's replacement, Cheyenne Jackson, assumed the role on June 21.

The opening night cast included Jackson as Sonny Malone, Kerry Butler as Kira, Tony Roberts as Danny Maguire and Zeus, and Jackie Hoffman and Mary Testa as "evil" Muse sisters, part of a new plot twist introduced in the Broadway version. Olivia Newton-John (star of the film) and composer John Farrar attended on opening night and joined the cast on stage during the curtain call. Whoopi Goldberg replaced Hoffman for a six-week run on July 28.

The production closed on September 28, 2008, after 49 previews and 513 performances.

=== First U.S. Tour ===
The tour opened at La Jolla Playhouse in San Diego, California, on November 11, 2008, and played until December 31. A Chicago run of the production began in January 2009 preceding the U.S. national tour. The Chicago run ended on March 29, and the production ran in Tokyo for a month. Elizabeth Stanley played Kira, and Max von Essen portrayed Sonny in the La Jolla, Chicago, and Tokyo runs of the production. The new U.S. national tour opened on December 15 the same year, in Costa Mesa, California, with Stanley and Von Essen.

=== Cancelled second U.S. Tour ===
The second U.S. Tour of Xanadu was scheduled to begin in September 2019. This production would have starred former RuPaul's Drag Race contestants Ginger Minj and Jinkx Monsoon as Melpomene/Medusa and Calliope/Aphrodite respectively. On September 20, the tour was canceled because of "soft ticket sales in certain markets".

=== Other productions ===
The producers of Xanadu licensed the exclusive Korean language rights to the show to Tin Tin Entertainment for two years. A production in Seoul opened in 2008. It starred Super Junior members Heechul and Kangin rotating in the role of Sonny and played from September 9 to November 23, at Doosan Art Center.

The Philippine production of Xanadu was mounted by Atlantis Productions, who staged the musical beginning September 3–19, 2010, with Rachel Alejandro and Felix Rivera in the roles of Clio/Kira and Sonny, respectively.

The Australian production opened on March 1, 2011, in a big top called the Grand Xanadu Marquee in the Melbourne Docklands. The roles of Clio/Kira, Sonny, Danny/Zeus, Calliope/Aphrodite and Melpomene/Medusa were played by Christie Whelan, Sam Ludeman, John McTernan, Susan-Ann Walker, and Cherine Peck, respectively.

A London production opened at the Southwark Playhouse Theatre in October 2015 produced by David Ian Ltd. This production added Olivia Newton-John's hit "Physical".

A Sydney, Australia production began performances on May 12, 2016, at the Hayes Theatre. The production, directed and choreographed by Nathan M. Wright, starred Jaime Hadwen (Clio/Kira), Ainsley Melham (Sonny), and Rob Thomas (Danny), with Jayde Westaby, Francine Cain, James Maxfield, Dion Bilios, Kay Hoyos, and Catty Hamilton. Musical direction was by Andrew Bevis, and the production was produced by Matthew Henderson (Matthew Management).

The show was staged at the American Theater Company in Chicago, Illinois, for seven weeks in 2016.

The show also had a successful 13-week run in 2017–18 at the Civic Light Opera in Pittsburgh, Pennsylvania; three weeks were added to the original run because of demand for ticket sales. Pittsburgh is the hometown of Xanadu film star Gene Kelly, and the musical was done in part as homage to the former screen great and Pittsburgh Civic Light Opera honorary chairman of the board.

== Synopsis ==
It is 1980 and chalk artist Sonny Malone is dissatisfied with his sidewalk mural of the Greek Muses (daughters of Zeus) and determines to kill himself. On Mount Olympus, Clio (pronounced "Kleye-o"), the youngest, perkiest Muse, convinces her six sisters (two of whom are men in drag), to travel to Venice Beach (rising out of the sidewalk mural) to inspire Sonny ("I'm Alive"). Zeus's rules require that Muses must always be disguised from mortals. Clio has the idea to wear roller skates, leg warmers, and sport an Australian accent, and the other muses agree. Clio changes her name to something contemporary: "Kira". Quickly inspired ("Magic"), Sonny decides that he can combine all the arts and "something athletic" all into one spectacular entertainment: a roller disco.

Two of Clio's sisters, Melpomene (the oldest sister) and Calliope, are jealous that Clio (although the youngest) is the leader of the Muses and that Zeus had promised "Xanadu" to Clio, although no one knows exactly what that entails ("Evil Woman"). So they plot to discredit Clio and cause her banishment by tricking her into breaking one of Zeus's rules: a Muse must not fall in love with a mortal, so they will curse "Kira" and Sonny to fall in love.

Meanwhile, Sonny finds a good location for the roller disco, a long-abandoned theater in the Fairfax district of Los Angeles called "Xanadu". "Kira" inspires him to locate the owner in the phone book ("Suddenly"), and they set up a meeting with real estate mogul Danny Maguire, who used to be a big band clarinetist before he started in the real estate game.

Sonny visits hard-hearted Danny in his posh office in downtown Los Angeles and tries to convince him to donate the theater for the roller disco, because it would bring the arts to the Fairfax district and drive up real estate values. But Danny scoffs, even though he had plans to open the theater himself, once upon a time. As Sonny leaves, "Kira" arrives, jogging Danny's memories of an old love and dance partner of his, who looked suspiciously like "Kira", named Kitty ("Whenever You're Away from Me"). Kira tells Danny that although he had let his greed stop him from pursuing his dream to open the theater 35 years ago, he has a chance to redeem himself now by opening the roller disco with Sonny. Danny finds Sonny and tells him that if he can get the disco up and running in one day, he'll give him 25% of the take from the Disco ("Dancin'"). Excited, Sonny readily agrees.

Sonny finds "Kira" and tells her the good news. She is not impressed with the deal that he has cut. It is then that the evil sisters work their curse, and the winged Eros, along with "Mama Cupid", shoots "Kira" and Sonny with the arrows of love ("Strange Magic"). "Kira" is soon overwhelmed with guilt over her loving feelings and of having created her own art (a hand-drawn picture) alongside Sonny – both violations of Zeus's restrictions on the Muses.

With the help of some of the muses, "Kira" and Sonny fix up the old theater ("All Over the World"), and Danny agrees to go ahead with the opening. Clio realizes that she is falling in love with Sonny and tells him that she must leave ("Don't Walk Away"). But the evil sisters are not finished. Now they offer Danny piles of money if he will tear down the theater and build condos. Danny can't resist and tells Sonny that the deal is off.

"Kira" comes back to tell Sonny that she loves him, but the evil sisters tell her that she has broken Zeus's rules, and that she must tell Sonny the truth. So "Kira" reveals all to Sonny, including that her name is Clio, but he does not believe her and is upset. He suggests that she is a crackpot. He also doubts that she really loves him, and she is angry and hurt ("Fool"). The evil sisters have triumphed ("The Fall"), and Kira sets off for Mount Olympus to receive her punishment from Zeus ("Suspended in Time").

Meanwhile, Sonny and Danny discuss "Kira" and after seeing her in the sky, it all makes sense. Danny tells Sonny not to let go of his muse because of foolish pride as he once did back in the 1940s. Sonny, realizing that he really loves "Kira", decides to find her - even if it means climbing Mount Olympus.

Back on Mount Olympus, Zeus's wives ask him to take pity on Clio ("Have You Never Been Mellow"). Thetis retells the story of Achilles and his vulnerable heel. All the demi-gods and demi-goddesses are so afflicted. This gives Clio an epiphany: she, too, is invulnerable, except for her heels, but when the evil sisters had her shot with the arrows of love, she had been wearing the "mighty legwarmers", and so she must have been completely invulnerable. This means that she really did love Sonny. Kira then declares her love for Sonny and rips off her legwarmers ("I'm Free") and attempts to fly away with Pegasus and Sonny, before Zeus pulls them down with copper chains. Sonny brashly declares that he would even fight Zeus for the woman he loves. Zeus, impressed with his pluck, decides to pardon Clio. The two evil sisters are displeased, the lovers are reunited, and Zeus reveals what Xanadu is: "True love and the ability to create and share art". Clio and Sonny go back to L.A. and Xanadu ("Xanadu").

== Musical numbers ==
- "I'm Alive" - Clio/Kira and the Muses
- "Magic" - Kira
- "Evil Woman" - Melpomene, Calliope and the Sirens
- "Suddenly" - Kira and Sonny
- "Whenever You're Away From Me" - Danny and Kira
- "Dancin'" - Danny, Sonny and the Muses
- "Strange Magic" - Melpomene, Calliope and Kira
- "All Over the World" - Sonny and the Muses
- "Don't Walk Away" - Sonny, Danny and the Muses
- "Fool" - Kira and the Muses
- "The Fall" - Sonny and the Muses
- "Suspended in Time" - Kira and Sonny
- "Have You Never Been Mellow" - Kira and the Greek gods
- "I'm Free" - Kira, Sonny, and Pegasus [Young Woman]†
- "Xanadu" - Kira, Sonny, Danny and the Muses

† Does not appear on the cast recording

== Casts ==
The following are the casts of the major productions:

Character	Broadway 2007	U.S. Tour 2008
Clio / Kira	Kerry Butler	Elizabeth Stanley
Sonny Malone	Cheyenne Jackson	Max von Essen
Danny Maguire, Zeus	Tony Roberts	Larry Marshall
Melpomene, Medusa	Mary Testa	Natasha Yvette Williams
Calliope, Aphrodite	Jackie Hoffman	Annie Golden
Thalia, Siren, '80s Singer, Cyclops, Young Danny	Curtis Holbrook	Jason Michael Snow (also Eros)
Euterpe, Siren, '40s Singer, Thetis	Anika Larsen	Veronica J Kuehn
Erato, Siren, '40s Singer, Hera, Eros	Kenita R. Miller	Chauntee Schuler
Terpsichore, Suthiba, Siren, '80s Singer, Hermes, Centaur	Andre Ward	Jesse Nager (also Young Danny)
Featured Skater, Swing	Marty Thomas	Jesse Nager (also Young Danny)

== Critical reception ==
Xanadu's opening-night reviews from the New York critics were mostly positive. The musical broke the Helen Hayes one-day box office record the day after the reviews came out.

Charles Isherwood, in The New York Times, wrote that the show is "simultaneously indefensible and irresistible... there's so much silly bliss to be had... there is enough first-rate stage talent rolling around in Xanadu to power a season of wholly new, old-school, non-jukebox musicals, if someone would get around to writing a few good ones... the show's winking attitude toward its own aesthetic abjectness can be summed up thus: If you can't beat 'em, slap on some roller skates and join 'em". Although Isherwood praised most of the cast, he noted that the musical "does have a few dead spots in its brisk 90-minute running time.... Mr. Beane's inspiration seems to have failed him when it came to minting fresh fun from the subplot involving flashbacks to Danny's 1940s romance. The stage "Xanadu" can't really muster much in the way of an extravaganza, either.... The production is skimpy on both the casting and design fronts".

Hilton Als' review in The New Yorker called Xanadu "probably the most fun you'll have on Broadway this season, one reason being that everything about it is so resolutely anti-Broadway. In its wildness and ecstasy, Xanadu is a welcome relief from the synthetic creations that some Broadway producers have been peddling for years. Here you can't count the disco balls fast enough—not to mention the roller skates, the frosted-pink lips, and the glittering spandex that the director, Christopher Ashley, hurls at you like a PCP flashback. Xanadu is far sleazier and cheesier than conventional musical theatre, and it points out just how tame most other musicals are".

== Original cast recording ==
PS Classics recorded the original cast recording of the musical on October 29, 2007, and released it to stores on January 8, 2008.

== Cubby Bernstein promotion ==
On May 10, 2008, a video introducing "Tony Campaign Manager Cubby Bernstein" was released on YouTube. The video features Tony Award winners Duncan Sheik, Julie White, Beth Leavel, John Cullum, Martin Richards and Carole Shelley. Pre-pubescent "Cubby" claims to have been behind 63 Tony wins. Additional videos were released every few days. On the second episode, the producers of Xanadu ask Cubby if he would campaign for their show, but Cubby refuses, saying that it is a show for "the gay boys". However, the producers convince Cubby to go and see the show, which "bowls him over". He then says that Xanadu can win the Tony, creating the campaign's slogan "Yes It Can!"

Subsequent episodes feature more Tony Award winners, including Patti LuPone, Cynthia Nixon, Adriane Lenox, John Lloyd Young, and John Gallagher Jr., and follow Cubby while he shows the cast of Xanadu the "Cubby steps to the Tony". Cubby makes them sell "Cub-Cakes" to benefit the charity Broadway Cares/Equity Fights AIDS during the one-year anniversary of Xanadu on Broadway, teaches them "the art of the shmooze", and helps them build up their confidence. The sixth and most popular video is the only one in which Cubby doesn't appear. It features Tony winner Nathan Lane and most of the Xanadu male cast.

Xanadu producers never acknowledged that Cubby Bernstein was a publicity stunt, although Douglas Carter Beane stated on May 15 that he believed this year "[Cubby] is going to go with Xanadu". Cubby Bernstein was identified by Variety as child actor Adam Riegler, who appeared in the 2007 revival of I and Albert and in The Addams Family as Pugsley Addams. Playwright Paul Downs Colaizzo helped to create and also appeared in the series. Xanadu did not win any Tony Awards.

== Awards and nominations ==
=== Original Broadway production ===
Year	Award ceremony	Category	Nominee	Result	Ref
2008	Tony Award	Best Musical		Nominated	
2008	Tony Award	Best Book of a Musical	Douglas Carter Beane	Nominated	
2008	Tony Award	Best Performance by a Leading Actress in a Musical	Kerry Butler	Nominated	
2008	Tony Award	Best Choreography	Dan Knechtges	Nominated	
2008	Drama Desk Award	Outstanding Musical		Nominated	
2008	Drama Desk Award	Outstanding Book of a Musical	Douglas Carter Beane	Won	
2008	Drama Desk Award	Outstanding Actor in a Musical	Cheyenne Jackson	Nominated	
2008	Drama Desk Award	Outstanding Featured Actress in a Musical	Mary Testa	Nominated	
2008	Drama Desk Award	Outstanding Director of a Musical	Christopher Ashley	Nominated	
2008	Drama Desk Award	Outstanding Choreography	Dan Knechtges	Nominated	

== See also ==
- Muses in popular culture
