= The Convent of Pleasure =

1668 play by Margaret Cavendish

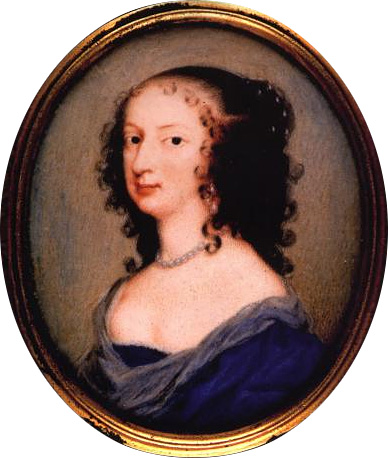
- Portrait of Margaret Cavendish
- Author: Margaret Cavendish
- Language: Early Modern English
- Genre: Comedy
- Publication date: 1668

The Convent of Pleasure is a comedic play first published by Margaret Cavendish in 1668. It tells the story of Lady Happy, a noblewoman who chooses to reject marriage in favor of creating a community - the titular “convent” - in which she and other women of noble birth can live free from the constraints of patriarchy. Like much of Cavendish's fiction, it explores utopian ideals and questions the expected roles of women in 17th-century English society.

The play was published under Cavendish's name, which was unusual for a work written by a woman at the time. Cavendish never attempted to have it staged, and instead devised it as something more akin to a closet drama. Some sections of the play have been attributed to her husband William Cavendish, who also helped her publish some of her work.

== Characters ==
- Lady Happy: A wealthy noblewoman who inherits her father's estate and decides to seclude herself inside with a group of other women rather than finding a man to marry.
- Madam Mediator: A widow and a friend of Lady Happy who does not join the convent, but is allowed to visit.
- The Princess/The Prince: An unnamed suitor who joins the convent in the guise of a woman and develops a romantic relationship with Lady Happy. This character is listed as "The Princess" in the first edition list of characters, and for most of the play, stage directions refer to this character as "Princess." Near the end of the play, an ambassador arrives who declares that the Princess is a prince who has gone missing from his kingdom; from this point, the stage directions refer to this character as the "Prince" rather than the "Princess."
- Monsieur Take-Pleasure: The informal leader of a group of men who oppose the existence of the convent and devise unsuccessful schemes to bring an end to it. He is accompanied by His Man Dick, as well as Monsieur Facil, Monsieur Adviser, and Monsieur Courtly.
- Lady Amorous and Lady Vertue: Two married women who live outside the convent. Friends of Madam Mediator.
- Mimick: A fool in service of Lady Vertue, who delivers the epilogue of the play.

Several of the secondary characters also appear in Cavendish's play The Bridals: namely, Lady Amorous, Lady Vertue, Monsieur Take-Pleasure, Monsieur Adviser, and Monsieur Facil.

== Summary ==
Act I begins with three Gentlemen discussing the death of Lady Happy's father, Lord Fortunate. They describe their intent to woo her now that she is independently wealthy. Lady Happy tells Madam Mediator that her own plan is to live with other women and enjoy a life away from men.

In Act II, the Monsieurs disapprove of Lady Happy's plan because it prevents them from acquiring her wealth through marriage. They decide to petition the state to dissolve her convent. Madam Mediator visits the convent and hears from Lady Happy and the other inhabitants about how much they enjoy life inside the convent. She also relates a rumour that an unknown Princess wishes to join the convent. The act ends with the Monsieurs, who have been unable to garner state intervention against the convent, concocting a plan to disguise themselves as working women in order to enter, however, they never achieve to do so.

The Princess is welcomed to the convent at the start of Act III. The Princess notes that many of the women in the convent have paired off together romantically, with some wearing men's clothes. The Princess asks to "act Lovers-parts" in male attire with Lady Happy, who gladly agrees. The women of the convent then stage a play within the play (also called a masque), depicting the miseries which men cause for women: husbands who get drunk, abuse their wives, and spend or gamble all their money; the physical and mental strain of pregnancy, childbirth, and child-rearing; the sorrow of children's deaths; the horror of rape. At the end of this play, the Princess expresses mild disapproval, saying that more people are happy in their marriages than are unhappy.

Act IV begins with a pastoral scene: Lady Happy, dressed as a shepherdess, is feeling overwhelmed by her love for the Princess. The Princess arrives dressed as a shepherd and they embrace and kiss. Another woman dressed as shepherd attempts to woo Lady Happy but is rejected, while the Princess's advances are accepted. The pastoral scene closes with verses believed to be written by Margaret Cavendish's husband. A dance is organized with a prize to be awarded to the best dancers. The prize is awarded to Lady Happy and the Princess. The Princess soliloquizes, resolving to remain with Lady Happy rather than return to the masculine outside world. An extended water-nymph scene follows: the Princess, dressed as Neptune, and Lady Happy, dressed as a sea goddess, sit surrounded by sea-nymphs and describe their luxurious underwater kingdom.

In Act V, Madam Mediator announces that the ladies of the convent have been deceived by a man in women's clothing. The Princess calmly expects to be above suspicion, but an ambassador arrives and addresses the Princess as his Prince. The ambassador reports that their kingdom assumed their prince had been kidnapped, and is now planning to invade Lady Happy's kingdom. The Prince(ss) announces: "since I am discovered, go from me to the Councilors of this State, and inform them of my being here, as also the reason, and that I ask their leave I may marry this Lady; otherwise, tell them I will have her by force of Arms." In a scene labeled as "written by the Duke," Madam Mediator weeps to the gentlemen of the town that the reputation of the convent has been destroyed by the discovery of a man within its walls. After a conversation of sexual innuendo, she asks the gentleman to keep the Princess’s sex a secret, but they tell her that the news is already broadly known. The play ends with the marriage of the Prince and Lady Happy. They dance, and the Prince promises to maintain the convent of pleasure for virgins and widows.

== Major themes ==
=== Criticism of marriage ===
The Convent of Pleasure is one of several plays by Cavendish that depict a form of feminist separatist utopia, in which women attempt to improve their lives by avoiding marriage. As such, a key interpretive question for The Convent of Pleasure is whether Lady Happy's marriage at the end of the play represents a desirable ending, or a simple acknowledgement that for most women, marriage is inevitable.

In the play, the economic inequality of Early Modern marriage, in which a woman's property becomes the property of her husband, is represented as an obstacle to companionate marriage. The early scenes of the play repeatedly make the argument that marriage is a primarily economic relationship, and one in which wives are the losing party. By rejecting marriage, Lady Happy also therefore refuses to transfer her personal wealth to a husband. Her personal decision to remove a valuable commodity (herself) from economic circulation is seen by the other characters as a threat to the patriarchal social order. The character Monsieur Facil is responding to this threat when he petitions the state to force Lady Happy out of her convent "for the good of the Commonwealth."

The play also emphasizes the non-economic disadvantages of marriage for women, including wives' physical vulnerability to their husbands, the life-threatening danger of childbirth, and the emotional limitations caused by their subordination. Lady Happy repeatedly criticizes the social restraint placed on women by their role as wives. The long and detailed play-within-a-play depicting the suffering of marriage is particularly seen as presenting a categorical rejection of marriage. In contrast, life in the convent is presented as a fundamentally better existence for women. Specifically, it allows them greater bodily autonomy and agency, and the opportunity to enjoy physical pleasure through clothing, food, art and music.

In light of these strong critiques of marriage, analysis of the play often tries to identify the particular qualities of Lady Happy's relationship with the Prince(ss) which might allow them to be happy. These scholars point to Cavendish's reportedly happy marriage to her own husband, and to positive details of the relationship between Lady Happy and the Prince(ss), to support the idea that it is possible for women to desire marriage in a relationship that is non-hierarchical and collaborative.

=== Cross-dressing and queer themes ===
The main plot of the play hinges on cross-dressing, a common theme in Early Modern theatre, especially Shakespeare's comedies. One result of the Prince(ss)'s cross-dressing is that much of the play appears to show a lesbian romance. Some scholars see their relationship as a "fleeting fantasy" of lesbianism, which is overridden by a solidly heterosexual and patriarchal ending. Others see it as the first portrayal of "lesbian love" in English literature, and therefore part of an important history of queer literature. In both readings, the potential for lesbian pleasure is seen as an additional threat to the institution of patriarchal marriage.

Within Cavendish's play although the main topic is cross-dressing and female female love, other scholars have also noted the masculinity the Prince(ss) serves in the play. Reason being the constant note of Lady Happy mentioning how “masculine [her] servant" is. Within the text, their romance is seen as unnatural, although the Prince(ss) seems comfortable wearing men's clothing. This argument of male-female-male cross-dressing plays an important role on surprising the audience and breaking the gender norms, further enhancing the queer reading that can be given to The Convent of pleasure.

Lady Happy's desire to remain unmarried could also function as an asexual fantasy. Scholar Megan Cole argues that the emphasis on pleasure gravitates towards sensuality rather than sexuality, and that Lady Happy and the Prince(ss) never express the need for sexual satisfaction.

== See also ==
- Beguines and Beghards
