= Premature (2014 film) =

2014 American comedy film

- Directed by: Dan Beers
- Written by: Dan Beers; Mathew Harawitz
- Produced by: Aaron Ryder; Karen Lunder
- Starring: John Karna; Katie Findlay; Craig Roberts; Alan Tudyk
- Production companies: FilmNation Entertainment; AI Film
- Distributed by: IFC Midnight
- Release dates: March 7, 2014 (SXSW); July 2, 2014 (United States)
- Running time: 93 minutes
- Country: United States
- Language: English
- Budget: $1 million
- Box office: $5 million

Premature is a 2014 American sex comedy film directed by Dan Beers, written by Beers and Mathew Harawitz. The film stars John Karna, Katie Findlay, Craig Roberts, Carlson Young, Adam Riegler, and Alan Tudyk.

It was produced by Karen Lunder and Aaron Ryder, with music by Nick Urata, cinematography by Jimmy Lindsey and editing by Robert Nassau. The film is Beers' directorial debut.

The film premiered at SXSW on March 7, 2014. The film released on video on demand on July 1, 2014 and debuted a day later in theaters by IFC Midnight in the United States.

== Plot ==
Rob Crabbe is a regular, awkward high school student. On a particular day, Rob has a college-entrance interview that could change his life. As Rob wakes up from a wet dream, his mother walks into his room and asks Rob to clean his linens after she sees them stained obviously with semen. The interview is for admittance to Georgetown University (the alma mater of Rob's parents) and during the interview Jack Roth (the interviewer) bursts into tears because his wife recently died. A number of events, such as Rob's crotch being hit by another student with a water pistol and a minor bicycle/auto incident, occur to further mess up Rob's day.

An attractive classmate, Angela, gives Rob the impression that she wants to sleep with him. He visits Angela, the two kiss, and when Angela puts her hand in Rob's pants, he ejaculates prematurely and wakes up in his room, just at the same moment that his mother walks in on him. The day begins again. At first, Rob believes it all to be a dream, but after experiencing the same day several times, ending with his ejaculation, he realizes that it's not a dream. Rob then attempts to make the day different. He drives a golf cart through the school, smokes pot with his friend Gabrielle in the school bus, touches a teacher's breasts and tries to damage the water pistol, but none of it results in him escaping the time loop.

Rob eventually realizes that he's in love with Gabrielle and goes to her place to confess his feelings. Gabrielle returns his affection and the two have sex. Again, Rob has a premature ejaculation, but this time he does not wake up in his room, but is still with Gabrielle. He realizes that he has finally broken the time loop.

== Cast ==
- John Karna as Rob Crabbe - student
- Katie Findlay as Gabrielle - Rob's love interest, friend and student
- Craig Roberts as Stanley - Rob's best friend and student
- Carlson Young as Angela "After School Special" Yearwood
- Adam Riegler as Arthur - smart kid and student
- Alan Tudyk as Jack Roth - Georgetown College recruiter
- Brian Huskey as Principal Hansen
- Celeste Finn as Ms. Marconi
- Jonathan Kleitman as Uzy - Rob's bully and student
- Steve Coulter as Jim Crabbe - Rob's father
- Kate Kneeland as Anne Crabbe - Rob's mother
- Zoe Myers as Lisa

== Release ==
The film premiered at SXSW on March 7, 2014. IFC Midnight acquired the US distribution rights in May and gave it a simultaneous release in theaters and on VOD on July 2, 2014.

The film was released direct to video in select countries like Australia, where it was released on December 31, 2014 by Roadshow Entertainment.

== Critical reception ==
The film-critics aggregator Rotten Tomatoes reports a rating of 48% based on 21 reviews, with a weighted average score of 5/10. Metacritic, which uses a weighted average, assigned the film a score of 34 out of 100, based on 9 critics, indicating "generally unfavorable" reviews.

== See also ==
- List of films featuring time loops
