= The Blazing World (film) =

2021 film by Carlson Young

- Theatrical release poster
- Directed by: Carlson Young
- Written by: Carlson Young; Pierce Brown
- Based on: The Blazing World by Margaret Cavendish
- Produced by: Brinton Bryan
- Starring: Udo Kier; Dermot Mulroney; Edith Gonzalez; Vinessa Shaw; Soko; John Karna; Carlson Young
- Cinematography: Shane F. Kelly
- Edited by: James K. Crouch
- Music by: Isom Innis
- Production companies: Greenbelt Films; Tealhouse Entertainment; American Stream Wave; Wavelength Productions
- Distributed by: Vertical Entertainment
- Release dates: January 31, 2021 (Sundance); October 15, 2021 (United States)
- Running time: 101 minutes
- Country: United States
- Language: English

The Blazing World is a 2021 American fantasy horror-thriller film written and directed by Carlson Young (in her feature film directorial debut) and co-written by Pierce Brown. The film stars Udo Kier, Dermot Mulroney, Vinessa Shaw, Soko, John Karna, Young and Edith González in her final film role before her death in 2019. The film is loosely inspired by Margaret Cavendish's 1666 work of the same name. In 2018, Young wrote, directed and starred in the short film of the same name, prior to expanding the basis and ideas for the full-length film. It is the first in a planned trilogy of films entitled Saturn Returns.

== Plot ==
Margaret, having endured the tragic loss of her twin sister Elizabeth due to a drowning accident in their childhood, grapples with persistent suicidal ideation even in her adulthood. Upon returning to her family home, she experiences a transition to an alternate dimension where Elizabeth may still be alive.

== Cast ==
- Udo Kier as Lained
- Dermot Mulroney as Tom Winter
- Vinessa Shaw as Alice Winter
- Soko as Margot
- John Karna as Blake
- Carlson Young as Margaret Winter
- Liz Mikel as Dr. Cruz

== Release ==
The film had its world premiere at the 2021 Sundance Film Festival on January 31, 2021 in the Next section. In September 2021, Vertical Entertainment acquired the film and released on October 15, 2021.

== Reception ==
The review aggregator website Rotten Tomatoes had it with a 59% rating based on reviews from 49 critics. The site's consensus reads, "The Blazing World's scattershot script isn't always able to support writer-director-star Carlson Young's ambitions, but its arresting visuals hold the attention". On Metacritic it has a score of 33 based on reviews from 9 critics, indicating "generally unfavorable" reviews.

Meagan Navarro of Bloody Disgusting wrote "Young's debut is ambitious and refuses to adhere to commercial conformity. It may not hit its emotional marks or substantially reinvent trauma depictions, but it's hard to ever be bored by a film that plays like a whimsical horror-fairy tale on acid".

Monica Castillo and Kristy Puchko of RogerEbert.com had a different take on the film. According to Puchko, the film "is impressive" and "awe[s] with outrageousness", while Castillo's take is that "The Blazing World falls short narratively and visually".

The Hollywood Reporter's Frank Scheck commented that "There's plenty of imagination on display in The Blazing World, but it's buried amidst the narrative and stylistic self-indulgence that assumes we'll be interested in going on this very strange and ultimately enervating journey".

Guy Lodge of Variety expressed a mixed reaction, stating that the film "throws an ornate heap of production design at an anemically scripted psychological metaphor, and counts on a combination of fairy dust and sheer determined nerve to make the whole contraption fly".

Sarah Jane of The Austin Chronicle, called the film "overstuffed and overextended". She praised the soundtrack (especially the songs by Isom Innis and Sean Cimino as Peel), which (along with Soko's appearance) "buoyed" the film.
