= WTC View =

- Theatrical release poster
- Directed by: Brian Sloan
- Written by: Brian Sloan (play and screenplay)
- Produced by: Robert Ahrens; Brian Sloan
- Starring: Michael Urie; Melizabeth Kapplow
- Music by: Billy Alletzhauser; Todd Almond
- Release date: 2005
- Country: United States
- Language: English

WTC View is an American film released in 2005, based on the 2003 play of the same name by Brian Sloan, that traces the search for a roommate in the weeks following the September 11 attacks.

== Plot ==
Eric (Michael Urie), a gay photographer, places an ad for a new roommate on September 10, 2001, for his apartment with a view of the World Trade Center. He encounters prospective roommates in varying stages of grief, including a campaign worker for mayoral candidate Mark Green, a boisterous construction worker, an idealistic NYU student, and a trader on Wall Street, each of whom share his own perspective on the events. Throughout the film, Eric deals with the aftermath of 9/11, the trauma it has caused and continues to cause him, and the resulting split from his boyfriend.

== Cast ==
- Michael Urie as Eric
- Jeremy Beazlie as Jeremy
- Lucas Papaelias as Kevin
- Elizabeth Kapplow as Josie
- Michael Linstroth as Jeff
- Nick Potenzieri as Alex
- Jay Gillespie as Max
- Stephen Sporer as Conor (voice)
- Jeff Wenger as Ben (voice)
- Bob Williams as Will (voice)
- M. Rosenthal as Victor (voice)
- Charles Couineau as Charles (voice)
- Tim Allis as Matt (voice)
- Jace Mclean as Ted (voice)
- Kevin Ray as Joey (voice)
- Pete Zias as Yval (voice)
- Julian Fleisher as Roommate Reject (voice) (billed as Julian Fleischer)
- Eric Sanders as Roommate Reject (voice)
- John Keating as Roommate Reject (voice)
- Brandon Taylor as Roommate Reject (voice)
- Mark Sam as Roommate Reject (voice)
- David Zellnik as Roommate Reject (voice)
