= Robert Ahrens =

American theatrical and film producer

- Born: 1970 (age 55–56)
- Education: Cornell University
- Occupations: Theatrical producer, film producer
- Known for: Xanadu and Little Shop of Horrors

Robert Ahrens (born 1969) is a theatrical and film producer based in New York City.

== Early life and education ==
Ahrens grew up in Long Island, New York. He graduated from Cornell University, where he was a member of the Lambda Chi Alpha fraternity. Ahrens began his career at the Chase Manhattan Bank.

== Career ==
Ahrens produced the Broadway musical Xanadu, which was nominated for Best New Musical at the 2008 Tony Awards. He began acquiring the stage rights to the Xanadu musical in 2002 after seeing an unauthorized 2001 stage production of the film. Working as an assistant to an executive at Paramount Pictures at the time, Ahrens pursued the rights to Xanadu and its soundtrack by the Electric Light Orchestra and swiftly began courting writer Douglas Carter Beane to write the book.

Ahrens led production on Just in Time, the Broadway musical, directed by Alex Timbers, that originally starred Jonathan Groff as Bobby Darin. He also led production on Call Me Izzy, a play by Jamie Wax, directed by Sarna Lapine and featuring Jean Smart. Ahrens is the lead producer of the first-ever Broadway revival of Chess, directed by Michael Mayer, that starred Aaron Tveit, Lea Michele, and Nicholas Christopher.

He also produced the revival of Little Shop of Horrors at the Westside Theatre in New York City, directed by Michael Mayer and choreographed by Ellenore Scott. The production has earned numerous honors, including Best Musical Revival Awards from the Drama Desk, the Drama League, and the Outer Critics Circle, with Christian Borle earning multiple Outstanding Featured Actor awards for his performance as “Orin.”

Ahrens produced three films, Bumping Heads, Book of Love, and WTC View. He also co-produced Evita on Broadway, and executive produced Finding Neverland. He has presented Kathy Griffin Wants a Tony, Frankie Valli and the Four Seasons, The Temptations, and The Four Tops on Broadway. Ahrens also produced the play Grey House, directed by Joe Mantello, on Broadway.
