= Jesse Nager =

American actor and singer (born 1981)

Jesse Nager (born June 23, 1981) is an American actor and singer. He has appeared in Broadway musicals (Mamma Mia, Mary Poppins, Good Vibrations, Scandalous, and Motown) as well as two First National Tours (Xanadu and Motown). Jesse has performed with Mariah Carey, Shania Twain, Jason Mraz, Debbie Gibson and Patti LaBelle. He is a member of the Broadway Inspirational Voices. Nager is the founder and artistic director of The Broadway Boys, a group of New York tenors who incorporate funk, gospel, pop, and rock into traditional showtunes.

== Life and career ==
Nager began working toward a theatrical career when he was attending Laguardia High School. He graduated from the University of Michigan School of Music, Theatre, and Dance in 2003. He made his Broadway debut in the musical Mamma Mia in 2004. He later went on to appear in Good Vibrations (2005 original cast), Mary Poppins (2006 original cast), Scandalous (2012 original cast), and Motown (2013 original cast). He has also performed in several regional theater productions, including Fame on 42nd Street, Once on this Island, Stephen Sondheim's Being Alive (directed by Billy Porter), and A Little Princess. He has also participated in workshops for musicals such as Rocky The Musical, Leap of Faith, Aladdin, and The Broadway Boys: Live In Concert. He is starring as musician Smokey Robinson in the First National Tour of Motown: The Musical.

Nager's father is African-American and his mother is Caucasian. Nager was raised Jewish.

== Discography ==
- Fame on 42nd Street (2003) Original Cast Recording
- A Little Princess (2011) Original Cast Recording
- Lullaby of Broadway (2010) The Broadway Boys
- Hark! (2010) The Broadway Boys
- Scandalous (2013) Original Cast Recording
- Motown (2013) Original Cast Recording
