= Intervention (musical) =

Intervention is a musical comedy with music and lyrics by Matt Corriel, and script by Jill Jaysen. It was also shown at the New York Musical Theatre Festival in 2007, the Center Stage Theatre Company in Westport, Connecticut, the Acorn Theatre in New York City, and the Staged Equity Reading, York Theatre NYC. It won the Moss Hart Award, and the cast included Adam Riegler.
