= Journal of the American Philosophical Association =

- Language: English
- Edited by: John Heil

Publication details
- History: 2015–present
- Publisher: American Philosophical Association (United States)
- Frequency: Quarterly

Standard abbreviations
- ISO 4: J. Am. Philos. Assoc.

Indexing
- ISSN: 2053-4477 (print); 2053-4485 (web)
- OCLC no.: 1088495302

Links
- Journal homepage; Online access; Online archive

The Journal of the American Philosophical Association, is a peer-reviewed academic journal published quarterly by the American Philosophical Association in partnership with Cambridge University Press. Launched in March 2015, the journal contains scholarly articles in philosophy and the exchange of ideas between philosophy and other fields, representing the diversity of philosophy as a discipline.

The Journal of the American Philosophical Association is a member of the Committee on Publication Ethics.

== See also ==
- Journal of the History of Philosophy
