= John Heil =

American philosopher

- Born: January 4, 1943; Washington, D.C., U.S.
- Died: October 27, 2026 (aged 83); Milton, Massachusetts, U.S.

Education
- Education: Vanderbilt University
- Thesis: The Identity Theory of Mind (1970)
- Doctoral advisors: John Joseph Compton; Clement Dore

Philosophical work
- Era: Contemporary philosophy
- Region: Western philosophy
- School: Analytic
- Institutions: Washington University in St. Louis; Durham University
- Main interests: Metaphysics; Philosophy of mind Logic

John Heil (January 4, 1943 – October 27, 2026) was an American philosopher, known primarily for his work on metaphysics and the philosophy of mind. Heil was Professor of Philosophy at the Washington University in St. Louis, Professor of Philosophy at Durham University, and an Honorary Research Associate at Monash University. Heil was the inaugural editor-in-chief of the Journal of the American Philosophical Association, the North American Representative of The Philosophical Quarterly, and a 2018 Guggenheim Fellow. He was the author of seven books and over 100 articles and book chapters. He passed away on October 27, 2026.

== Publications ==
=== Books ===
- Appearance in Reality (2021, Oxford)
- The Universe As We Find It (2012, Oxford)
- From an Ontological Point of View (2003, Oxford)
- Philosophy of Mind: A Contemporary Introduction (1998, Routledge)
- The Nature of True Minds (1992, Cambridge)
- Perception and Cognition (1983, University of California Press)

=== Edited books ===
- (with Alexander Carruth and Sophie Gibb) Ontology, Modality, and Mind: Themes from the Metaphysics of E. J. Lowe (2018, Oxford)
- Philosophy of Mind: A Guide and Anthology (2004, Oxford)
- (with Alfred Mele) Mental Causation (1993, Oxford)
- Cause, Mind, and Reality: Essays Honoring C. B. Martin (1989, Springer)

=== Selected articles ===
- Aristotelian Supervenience. Proceedings of the Aristotelian Society 115 (2014): 41–56.
- Properties and Powers. In: Oxford Studies in Metaphysics, Vol. 1, ed. D. Zimmerman, Oxford University Press (2004): 223–254.
- (with C.B. Martin) The Ontological Turn. Midwest Studies in Philosophy 23 (1999): 34–60.
- (with C.B. Martin) Rules and Powers. Philosophical Perspectives 12 (1998): 283–312.
- Believing Reasonably. Noûs 26 (1992): 47–62.
- Minds Divided. Mind 98 (1989): 571–583.
- Privileged Access. Mind 97 (1988): 238–251.
- Doubts About Skepticism. Philosophical Studies 51 (1987): 1–17.
- Doxastic Incontinence. Mind 93 (1984): 56–70.
- Does Cognitive Psychology Rest on a Mistake? Mind 90 (1981): 321–342.

== See also ==
- American philosophy
