= Journal of the History of Philosophy =

- Discipline: Philosophy, classics, history
- Language: English, French, German
- Edited by: Deborah Boyle

Publication details
- History: 1963–present
- Publisher: Johns Hopkins University Press (United States)
- Frequency: Quarterly

Standard abbreviations
- ISO 4: J. Hist. Philos.

Indexing
- ISSN: 0022-5053 (print); 1538-4586 (web)
- LCCN: 65009310
- OCLC no.: 1783132

Links
- Journal homepage; Journal page at publisher's website; Online access at Project MUSE

The Journal of the History of Philosophy is a quarterly peer-reviewed academic journal. It was established in 1963 after the Eastern Division of the American Philosophical Association passed a motion to this effect in 1957. The journal is published by the Johns Hopkins University Press and covers the history of Western philosophy. Time periods covered include everything from the ancient period to modern developments in the study of philosophy. The editor-in-chief is Deborah Boyle (College of Charleston).

== See also ==
- Journal of the American Philosophical Association
