= Matt Corriel =

American composer and lyricist

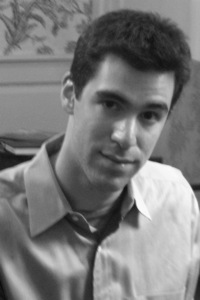
Matthew Joseph

Matthew Joseph "Matt" Corriel (born November 12, 1982) is an American composer and lyricist.

He was raised in Nanuet, New York. Corriel studied literature at Harvard University, graduating in 2005, and earned his JD from the University of Pennsylvania Law School in 2013. From 2007 to 2010, he was the operations director for Harvard's Freshman Arts Program and resident songwriter and drama tutor in Adams House.

Corriel's works for musical theatre include, among others, A Christmas Carol, Middle School Madness, High School Intervention, and Chocolate Soup, which are licensed through Dramatic Publishing. Both Intervention and Chocolate Soup won the annual Moss Hart Award of the New England Theatre Conference.
