= Karen Detlefsen =

Philosopher and academic administrator

Academic background
- Education: University of Toronto (PhD); University of Western Ontario (MA); University of Calgary (BA).
- Thesis: Generation and the individual in Descartes, Malebranche and Leibniz (2001)

Academic work
- Discipline: Philosophy

Karen Elizabeth Detlefsen is the Vice Provost for Education at the University of Pennsylvania, where she is also Professor of Philosophy in the School of Arts and Sciences and Affiliated Faculty of the Alice Paul Center for Research on Gender, Sexuality, and Women. She serves on the Editorial Board of the Journal of the History of Ideas.

== Education and career ==
Detlefsen earned her Ph.D. in Philosophy at the University of Toronto, an M.A. from the University of Western Ontario, and a B.A. in English and Philosophy from the University of Calgary. In 2021 she was an American Council of Learned Societies fellow. In 2021 Detlefsen was named vice-provost at the University of Pennsylvania.

== Research ==
Detlefsen works on early modern philosophy, with particular specialization in the role of women in philosophy and the philosophy of education and of science.

== Selected publications ==
- The Routledge Handbook of Women and Early Modern European Philosophy (edited with Lisa Shapiro). Routledge. 2023.
- Women and Liberty, 1600–1800: Philosophical Essays (edited with Jacqueline Broad). Oxford University Press. 2017.
- Detlefsen, Karen (2014). Descartes' Meditations. Cambridge: Cambridge University Press. ISBN 978-1-107-46317-2.
