= Deborah Boyle =

American philosopher

Education
- Education: University of Pittsburgh (PhD), Wellesley College (BA)

Philosophical work
- Era: 21st-century philosophy
- Region: Western philosophy
- Institutions: College of Charleston
- Main interests: early modern philosophy

Deborah Boyle is an American philosopher and professor of philosophy at the College of Charleston. She is known for her work on early modern philosophy and has been the editor of the Journal of the History of Philosophy since July 2020. She was an APA fellow from February to April 2021. She was the program chair for the 2026 APA Eastern Division meeting.

== Books ==
- Mary Shepherd: A Guide (Oxford University Press, 2023)
- The Well-Ordered Universe: The Philosophy of Margaret Cavendish (Oxford University Press, 2018)
- Descartes on Innate Ideas (Continuum, 2009)
- (ed.) Lady Mary Shepherd: Selected Writings (Imprint, 2018)
- (ed.) Margaret Cavendish's Philosophical Letters, Abridged (Hackett, 2021)
