= Emma L. E. Rees =

Professor in English and Gender Studies

Emma L. E. Rees is a professor in the Department of English at the University of Chester.

== Career ==
Dr. Emma L. E. Rees is professor in English and Gender Studies at the University of Chester, focusing on the early modern period, and on literature and film. Rees has written extensively on gender studies and representation, contributing chapters to a number of acclaimed academic works, including: The Female Body in Medicine and Literature (2011), 'The Girl with the Dragon Tattoo' and Philosophy (2011), Studying English Literature (2009), and Led Zeppelin and Philosophy (2009). Rees is author of the entry on 'Sexual Politics' for The Encyclopaedia of Sex and Society (2010).

Rees' latest work is The Vagina: A Literary and Cultural History, published by Bloomsbury (August 2013). Reviewing the book in British daily newspaper The Independent, Kaite Welsh began by saying, "For readers disappointed by Naomi Wolf's treatise on a similar topic last year, this is the book you’ve been waiting for. If Wolf's book was billed as Vagina: A New Biography, this could be subtitled A New Bibliography. An enjoyable romp through depictions of female genitalia from oral history to adverts, Rees examines the changing role of the cultural vagina." Welsh found that, "Although Rees is an academic by trade, the book gleefully mixes highbrow and lowbrow, from Chaucer to 21st-century horror", adding that, "If the book has a flaw, it is that it's mis-titled in the same way that Eve Ensler's Monologues were. This is a book more about the vulva itself than simply the vagina – labia and clitoris get their fair share of attention – but Rees acknowledges the sensationalist desire to talk simply about the part that gets penetrated and the way this obscures women's sexual desire. Would The Vulva Monologues have garnered quite that much attention?" She concluded her review by writing, "Rees lacks Wolf's sometimes po-faced anger, instead mixing her feminist outrage with a healthy dose of humour. Ever the cunning linguist, she leaves no pun unmade, but doesn’t skimp on the theory either, the perfect antidote for those feminists who find too much of the terminology dry and academic. This may not be the definitive text on the vagina – Rees is clear that she can't overturn centuries of embarrassment and taboo in a single book – but it's an excellent place to start."

Emma Rees is on the editorial board for the Gender Forum Journal, part of The Journal of Feminist Studies, and is also on the board for the Australian interdisciplinary gender, sexuality, and diversity studies journal, Writing From Below. Rees is a reviewer for English, the Journal of the English Association; for Psychology and Sexuality; for the GEA Journal (Gender and Education Association); for Women's Studies Quarterly and for Thirdspace: a Journal of Feminist Theory and Culture and has contributed pieces for Times Higher Education.

She is an individual affiliate of the Gender and Education Association (GEA), and affiliated to the International Association for the Study of Sexuality, Culture and Society (IASSCS).

== Research and teaching interests ==
Emma Rees specialises in Renaissance literature, and in representations of mental illness in literature and on film. Her research and teaching interests also include Shakespeare studies; early modern literature and culture; film theory (especially screen adaptations of literary texts), and gender studies.

== Published work ==
=== Books ===
- Rees, Emma L.E. (12 February 2015). The Vagina: A Literary and Cultural History (Reprint ed.). Bloomsbury Academic. ISBN 978-1628922127..
- Margaret Cavendish: Gender, Genre, Exile (Manchester University Press, 2004). (Concerning Margaret Cavendish, Duchess of Newcastle-upon-Tyne.)

=== Book chapters ===
- ‘The “Female Biography” of Dorothy Pakington’, in the Chawton House Library Edition of Mary Hays's six volume Female Biography (1803), ed. Gina Luria Walker (London: Pickering and Chatto, 2013–2014).
- ‘Imagining Ithaca: the Cavendishes in Exile’, in Authority, Authorship and Aristocratic Identity in Seventeenth-Century England: William and Margaret Cavendish and Their Political, Social and Cultural Circles, eds. Peter R. Edwards and Elspeth Graham (Leiden: Brill, 2016).
- ‘Narrating the Victorian Vagina: Charlotte Brontë and the Masturbating Woman’, in The Female Body in Medicine and Literature, eds. Andrew Mangham and Greta Depledge (Liverpool: University of Liverpool Press, 2011).
- ‘The Principled Pleasure: Lisbeth’s Aristotelian Revenge’, in ‘The Girl With The Dragon Tattoo’ and Philosophy, ed. Eric Bronson (New Jersey: Wiley Blackwell, 2011).
- ‘Cordelia’s Can’t: Rhetorics of Reticence and (Dis)ease in King Lear’, in Rhetorics of Bodily Disease and Health in Medieval and Early Modern England, ed. Jennifer Vaught (London: Ashgate, 2010).
- ‘Shakespeare and the Renaissance’, in Studying English Literature, eds Ashley Chantler and David Higgins (London: Continuum, 2010).
- Entry on ‘Sexual Politics’ for the Encyclopaedia of Sex and Society (New York: Marshall Cavendish, 2010).
- (with Richard E. Wilson) ‘Sometimes a Guitar is Just a Guitar: Freudian Fetishism in the lyrics of Led Zeppelin’, in Led Zeppelin and Philosophy, ed. Scott Calef (Chicago: Open Court, 2009).
- ‘A Well-Spun Yarn: Margaret Cavendish and Homer’s Penelope’, in A Princely Brave Woman: Essays on Margaret Cavendish, Duchess of Newcastle, ed. by Stephen Clucas (Aldershot: Ashgate, 2003).
- ‘Triply Bound: Genre and the Exilic Self’, in Authorial Conquests: Essays on Genre in the Writings of Margaret Cavendish, ed. by Line Cottegnies and Nancy Weitz (New Jersey: Associated University Press, 2003).
- ‘Sheela’s Voracity and Victorian Veracity’, in Consuming Narratives: Gender and Monstrous Appetite in the Middle Ages and the Renaissance, ed. by Liz Herbert McAvoy and Teresa Walters (Cardiff: University of Wales Press, 2002).

=== Journal articles ===
- Chris Ribchester, Kim Ross, and Emma L. E. Rees, ‘Examining the Impact of Pre-induction Social Networking on the Student Transition into Higher Education’, Innovations in Education & Teaching International (forthcoming, 2013).
- ‘‘Sweet honey of the Muses: Lucretian resonance in Poems, and Fancies’, In-Between: Essays in Literary Criticism, 9: 1 & 2 (2000).
- ‘Guest Editor’s Introduction’, Women’s Writing, 4: 3 (1997).
- ‘Heaven’s Library and Nature’s Pictures: Platonic paradigms and trial by genre’, Women’s Writing, 4:3 (1997).

=== Editorships ===
- Lost and Found: Stories from the Cheshire Prize for Literature, 2012 (Chester: University of Chester Press, 2013);
- Still Life: Poems from the Cheshire Prize for Literature, 2010 (Chester: University of Chester Press, 2011);
- Zoo: Stories from the Cheshire Prize for Literature, 2009 (Chester: Chester Academic Press, 2010).
