= I and Albert =

- West End theatre programme
- Music: Charles Strouse
- Lyrics: Lee Adams
- Book: Jay Presson Allen
- Basis: The lives of Queen Victoria and Prince Albert
- Productions: 1972 West End

I and Albert is a 1972 musical by composer Charles Strouse, and lyricist Lee Adams, with a book by Jay Presson Allen. The plot is based on the lives and love story of Queen Victoria and her husband Prince Albert of Saxe-Coburg and Gotha.

== Plot ==
At the royal court, Victoria is unhappy with her life, and longs for something more. She meets her German first cousin Albert in 1836, and despite their different backgrounds, they feel an attraction. Her father dies and she accedes to the throne. As the romance grows, Victoria and Albert face the expectations of British society and political, diplomatic and court pressures. But these challenges strengthen their relationship, and he becomes her most trusted advisor.

The two marry in 1840 with royal pomp and fanfare. They share responsibilities and a vision for the future. Albert encourages the queen to embrace progress and modernization of the monarchy to support cultural and industrial progress; he also supports her intellectual pursuits. The two experience joys and triumphs, such as the birth of their nine children and the joys of parenthood, as well as tragedies, such as his declining health and early death in 1861, and her grief and loneliness after his death. They have a lasting impact on Great Britain and the monarchy.

== Production ==
The musical debuted in the West End at the Piccadilly Theatre on 6 November 1972, under the direction of John Schlesinger, but proved a flop, running only for three months, for 120 performances. Polly James performed the role of Victoria opposite Sven-Bertil Taube as Prince Albert. Lewis Fiander and Aubrey Woods had featured roles as prime ministers and advisors. Sarah Brightman made her stage debut in 1973 in this musical, as Vicky, the queen's eldest daughter, at age 13. Also in the cast was Simon Gipps-Kent as a young Prince Edward ("Bertie"), a role he would later reprise for television in Edward the Seventh.

The musical made its North American premiere at the ArtPark amphitheater in Lewiston, New York, in the summer of 1985. The production was directed by Brother Augustine Towey, C. M., and starred Barbara Marineau as Victoria. Charles Strouse was the creative advisor on the production. I and Albert has not been performed on Broadway, but it was seen off-Broadway at York Theatre in 2007, starring Nancy Anderson and Gerritt Vandermeer, and directed by Michael Montel.

== Songs ==
Act I

- Vivat! Vivat Regina! – Victoria, Company
- It Has All Begun – Victoria, Lehzen and the People of England
- Leave It Alone – Lord Melbourne
- I've 'Eard the Bloody 'Indoos 'As It Worse – Street People
- The Victoria and Albert Waltz – Instrumental
- This Gentle Land – Albert
- This Noble Land – Victoria, Lord Melbourne, Lord Palmerston, the Cabinet, Chorale
- I and Albert – Victoria
- His Royal Highness – Lord Palmerston, Lady Caro and the Foreign Office
- Enough! – Albert
- Victoria – Albert
- All Glass – Albert, Victoria, Paxton, Royal Family and the public

Act 2

- The Genius of Man – Company
- His Royal Highness – Lord Palmerston and [?]
- Just You and Me – Victoria, Albert and the Royal Children
- Draw the Blinds – Victoria, Ladies-in-Waiting
- The Widow at Windsor (lyrics by Kipling) – Second Troop, Queen's Own Dismounted Hussars
- No One to Call Me Victoria – Victoria
- When You Speak with a Lady – Disraeli
- Go It, Old Girl! – Diamond Jubilee crowd
- Finale: This Noble Land (reprise)

== Reception ==
In the West End, the musical received mostly negative reviews, although the "splendour" of the production was praised, including its "clever" projections, along with James's performance.

== Recording ==
The cast album is a studio recording that reunited four of the original principals in London in 1981.
