= Bakugan: Mechtanium Surge =

- Season 4
- Poster for fourth season of Bakugan: Mechtanium Surge series
- No. of episodes: 46

Release
- Original network: Teletoon; Cartoon Network
- Original release: February 13, 2011 – January 26, 2012

Season chronology
- ← Previous; Gundalian Invaders

Bakugan: Mechtanium Surge is the fourth and final season of the Japanese anime television series Bakugan Battle Brawlers. The series originally had 27 episodes ordered, but Nelvana announced that the season would be extended to a total of 46 episodes, produced by TMS Entertainment and Maxpire Entertainment. The series premiered on Cartoon Network in Canada on February 13, 2011, the United States on March 5, 2011, and Australia on March 8, 2011.

On January 15, 2012, CoroCoro Comics announced that a series was in production that would feature the characters from the BakuTech! manga. It premiered on April 7, 2012, on TV Tokyo.

== Episode list ==
| No. overall | No. in season | Title | English air date |
|---|---|---|---|
| 144 | 1 | "Interspace Showdown"; Transliteration: "Shin jidai" (Japanese: 新時代) | February 13, 2011 (Canada); March 5, 2011 (USA) |
One whole year has passed after the defeat of Barodius and the Twelve Orders. Dan, Marucho and Shun have managed to rebuild Bakugan Interspace and expand it. The episode begins with Dan battling two Subterra and Darkus brawlers in Interspace with Marucho and Shun observing the battle. Marucho's new Guardian Bakugan, Aquos Trister, complains about not being able to battle after leaving Gundalia to team up with him. Shun's new partner, Ventus Taylean, tries to tell Trister to be patient but the two end up squabbling. Meanwhile, Dan and Drago are about to finish off their opponents with Dragon Strength but Drago has a vision of a strange Bakugan that makes him miss. Drago recovers, attacks them once again, and finishes them off with a few blows. After the battle, the Brawlers observe two rival teams battling, Team Anubias and Team Sellon. Ever since they appeared in Interspace, they have become among the top-ranked battlers, just below Dan and Drago. Suddenly, Team Anubias appears and starts trash talking the Brawlers, almost to the point of battling each other. However, their rivalry is interrupted by a sleazy dealer named Dylan who tries to get them to buy his stuff and causes both teams to leave. The Brawlers leave Interspace and reflect on the state of Bakugan Interspace. After Marucho turned over administrative duties to the system, Bakugan Interspace became nonrestrictive and allowed characters like Dylan to enter. That night, Dan has a dream about a strange, gold-armored masked man ensnaring him in darkness and demanding that he should give him what he wants. He then awakes in a startle and he and Drago discuss the visions they have been seeing. The next morning, Ben of Team Anubias challenges Dan to a battle. Marucho and Shun try to convince him not to fight and battling two days in a row is bad but Dan thinks that it will be no challenge and accepts. Meanwhile, Anubias scolds Ben for challenging Dan to which he replies that he is tired of fighting weak battlers. Anubias then lends him two Bakugan to defeat Dan. They then begin the battle. Ben sends out Pyrus Bolcanon and Dan sends out Drago. Drago struggles against Bolcanon due to its stealthy maneuvers but Drago uses an ability that blows a hole in the field. They then continue the battle underground. Drago nearly defeats Bolcanon but then Ben throws out Darkus Horridian. Drago struggles fighting against the two when suddenly Dan and Drago begin to have visions again and Drago loses control of his powers. He then defeats Bolcanon and Horridian but begins to destroy the arena. Marucho and Shun then send out Trister and Taylean to stabilize the arena until Drago calms down. Dan then sees that the arena is almost completely destroyed and is shocked by the huge amount of tremendous power Drago has displayed. Dan and Drago then wonder what they just did. Meanwhile, Team Sellon have been watching the battle, with Sellon herself showing an interest in Drago's tremendous power, going as far as stating a desire to obtain it.
| 145 | 2 | "Mechtogan Mayhem"; Transliteration: "Koutetsu no kyojin" (Japanese: 鋼鉄の巨人) | February 20, 2011 (Canada); March 12, 2011 (USA) |
Sometime after Dan's battle with Ben from Team Anubias, Marucho and Shun talk to Dan about having Drago sit out for a while. Dan, however, disagrees and says he will get Drago's powers under control, but secretly, he's extremely nervous about the amount of power Drago unleashed and decides to go and train to get Drago's powers under control. Meanwhile, Marucho decides to have a battle to make up for Dan having to sit out, so he fights against Jack of Team Anubias. He and Trister struggle to win against Jack and his Guardian Bakugan, Aquos Krakenoid. Meanwhile, Dan and Drago found an abandoned arena to use as a training ground, but when Drago is training, a mysterious Mechtogan who calls himself Zenthon appears and wreaks havoc on the arena. Dan and Drago try to defeat it, but it blocks Drago's attacks and eventually teleports away. It then interferes with Marucho and Jack's battle and wipes out Krakenoid and Trister with its laser cannon. Anubias and Sellon then decide to battle Zenthon and send out Horridian and Spyron. The two of them struggle to fight it, not even managing to land a hit because of Zenthon's shield. Eventually, however Zenthon flies off and Anubias and Sellon part ways. Marucho and Shun later speculate that since Zenthon has the same destructive power as Drago they may be connected. Meanwhile, the masked man, whose name is officially revealed to be Mag Mel, is trying to break free of his prison but requires more energy from Dan and Drago to fulfill his goal Then one of his hooded servants informs him of the Mechtogan attack. He is astounded that Drago has that sort of power and tries to absorb more energy from Drago and he begins to break free.
| 146 | 3 | "Disconnect"; Transliteration: "Raibaru" (Japanese: ライバル) | February 27, 2011 (Canada); March 19, 2011 (USA) |
After Dan declines to sign autographs while greeting his fans, Anubias challenges the top-ranked brawler to a match, which Dan accepts. The first round goes to Drago, who successfully keeps his powers under control. The second round goes to Anubias because Drago tried too hard to control his powers and didn't focus on the battle. During another power overload in the last brawl, Dan tells Drago to run and not to fight. Anubias uses the opportunity to strike Drago and wins the brawl. Dan and Drago's fans are surprised as well as disappointed and begin to leave the arena. After the brawl, Anubias tells Dan that he is disappointed that he brawled like an amateur but still says that he has respect for him even though it appeared Dan has no respect for him. He then suggests that if Dan's heart is no longer in brawling, he should simply quit.
| 147 | 4 | "Fall From Grace"; Transliteration: "Michishirube" (Japanese: 道標) | March 6, 2011 (Canada); March 26, 2011 (USA) |
Shun and Marucho discover that Dan and Drago are training secretly, and that Drago spawned Zenthon. They then fight alongside Dan against Zenthon and none of their attacks are strong enough to defeat Zenthon's shield. The next day Sellon and Dan have a match but Shun decides to join in to help keep Drago from losing control of his new powers again. So Chris from Sellon's team battles alongside her, making it a tag-team battle. Drago has difficulties controlling his newly amplified abilities and almost releases Zenthon, but Shun and Taylean prevent this from happening by siphoning off Drago's excess power. Dan and Shun manage to pull out a win but Sellon throws the battle and wins over the audience. Shun confronts her as to why she let them win, to which Sellon makes an offer for Shun to join her team. He however declines since he has doubts about her team.
| 148 | 5 | "Tri-Twister Take Down"; Transliteration: "Haran no jidai" (Japanese: 波乱の時代) | March 13, 2011 (Canada); April 2, 2011 (USA) |
Some tension between the Brawlers rises, when Shun suggests to Dan that he should take a break from battling as to avoid another one of Drago's power loss disasters. However, Dan interprets this as Shun mistrusting him and they argue. Shun is later confronted by Sellon, who still wants him on her team and suggests that he give Dan some tough love. Later the Brawlers are challenged by two boys named Sion and Lucas calling themselves the Tri-Twisters. Shun and Marucho decide to take it themselves without telling Dan, but have some trouble against the opponents. Dan discovers this and wants to help but begins to realize that Shun may have had a point earlier. They then discover that there is a third Bakugan, previously attacking invisibly, present. Sellon and Anubias suddenly interrupt the battle, wanting to teach the boys a lesson in honor and easily defeat them. The battle is then declared no contest and Dan and Drago realize that if they don't figure out how to control their powers soon, there will be more trouble.
| 149 | 6 | "Agony of Defeat"; Transliteration: "Dōran" (Japanese: 動乱) | March 20, 2011 (Canada); April 9, 2011 (USA) |
Dan still refuses to listen to Shun and Marucho when they tell him to take a break from battling. Even though he is still plagued by nightmares about Mag Mel and Razenoid, Dan doesn't mind battling Anubias, with the winner being crowned the official number one brawler of Bakugan Interspace. Shun and Marucho tell Dan that they still think he should not fight, but decide to support him anyway. Dan thanks them and promises to reveal everything after the battle. During the fight, a vision of Mag Mel and Razenoid appear and Dan and Drago think they are fighting them instead of Anubias, causing them to lay waste to the field and endanger the crowd. To make matters worse, Zenthon reappears and everyone learns that Drago created him. Once Zenthon leaves, Dan and Drago's vision disappears and things return to normal. The battle is declared over; Dan is disqualified for illegally using Zenthon (even though it was unintentional) and Anubias is crowned Number One of Bakugan Interspace. Unable to face his fans and shattered bonds between his friends, on top of the fact that Dan can still see Mag Mel and Razenoid, Dan packs up his things then goes to New Vestroia with Drago and disappears without a trace as he cannot bear to face his best friends anymore.
| 150 | 7 | "BakuNano Explosion"; Transliteration: "Isshin" (Japanese: 維新) | March 27, 2011 (Canada); April 9, 2011 (USA) |
Dan and Drago have disappeared and all sorts of negative rumors are spreading throughout Interspace. Team Anubias is dominating the battlefield, now that Anubias himself is number one in the rankings. Shun and Marucho arrive in Interspace and discover that brawlers are now using BakuNano, equipment much like Battle Gear that amplifies a Bakugan's destructive powers. When they question Dylan, they discover that the upgrade for the BakuNano just appeared out of nowhere. Sellon has another talk with Shun and suggests that he take the position of leader of the Brawlers and put an end to the BakuNanos since Dan and Drago are gone. Shun at first refuses. Their conversation is interrupted when Marucho suffers a brutal defeat by the Bash Brothers, a duo utilizing BakuNanos. Intervening in the crisis, Shun engages and defeats the two brothers without relying on any BakuNano technology. He managed to defeat them, despite not using any BakuNano himself. He speaks out to the crowd, taking the position of leader and claiming that as the new leader of the Brawlers he will abolish the harsh and dangerous style of brawling accidentally set off by Dan and Drago. Sellon is then seen stating that Shun has fallen right into her trap. The episode ends with Dan and Drago suddenly arriving at New Vestroia after traveling through a Dimension Tunnel.
| 151 | 8 | "Return to New Vestroia"; Transliteration: "Wandā reboryūshon" (Japanese: ワンダーレボリューション) | April 3, 2011 (Canada); April 16, 2011 (USA) |
Dan and Drago finally arrive in New Vestroia, to train in an attempt to control Drago's new powers. In Drago's secret training area, Dan and Drago find Aquos Amazon and Preyas himself asking if Marucho is with him in which Dan replies no. Amazon, having heard all about Drago from Preyas, wishes to battle with Drago. However, Dan and Drago are unsure because they may lose control of their powers again. Dan determines that each time Drago has lost control it has been in Bakugan Interspace, a virtual world and the result may be different in the real world. While Drago and Amazon begin battling, Mag Mel and Razenoid begin feeling Drago's immense power, deducing that he is battling in the real world. During the battle, Dan and Drago suddenly have another vision of Mag Mel and Razenoid and they pass out with one last fireball. Preyas and Amazon leave while Dan and Drago rest. Amazon thinks that he is more powerful, than Drago but Preyas says that something is wrong with him. Back in Bakugan Interspace, Shun is dominating the battlefield and defeating opponent after opponent. Marucho is impressed but thinks that Shun should take it easy. Shun, however brushes him off and declares that as the Brawlers' new leader, it's up to him to get them back on top. Back in New Vestroia, Dan and Drago are worried that their visions have been carried out in the real world. The episode ends with Mag Mel and Razenoid realizing that Dan and Drago are in New Vestroia.
| 152 | 9 | "Chaos Control"; Transliteration: "Hontō no teki" (Japanese: 本当の敵) | April 10, 2011 (Canada); April 23, 2011 (USA) |
Drago is seen training by himself for some reason. Then a flashback which shows Drago wishing to train on his own and away from Dan but he doesn't want Drago to train by himself but Drago says that he's no good to anyone and he flies away. Mag Mel is then seen talking to Anubias about the whereabouts of Dan and Drago and it would never occur to him that they were at New Vestroia, the home of all Bakugan. Mag Mel then gives Anubias a Chaos Bakugan called Darkus Iron Dragonoid and a new Mechtogan called Venexus. Mag Mel then tells Anubias to go to New Vestroia and to find Dan and Drago. Anubias then goes back to Bakugan Interspace and transforms into his Gundalian form. After that, he then goes to New Vestroia. Just as Anubias arrives to New Vestroia, he doesn't reveal his identity and says that he is a messenger and he says skip the introductions and to battle. Anubias first summons Darkus Iron Dragonoid and attacks Preyas and Drago with Ollan Terror attack. When Drago gets hit by the attack, Preyas steps in to defend him. While on Earth, Marucho and Shun are at the place where they were waiting for Dan in episode 6, talking about Dan. Back on Earth, Marucho is really worried about Dan and Drago but Shun doesn't seem to care about them one bit because they ran off to New Vestroia without even telling them. Dan senses that something is wrong with Drago and he rushes to Drago's location by riding on Amazon's head to get to him. Preyas continues to battle the Iron Dragonoid and he is doing fine against it until Anubias summons Mechtogan Venexus. Preyas proves to be no match for the Mechtogan Venexus putting Drago into a rage and making him lose control of his powers. Drago lays waste to the battlefield and he summons Mechtogan Zenthon. After that Dan arrives with Amazon and Dan manages to snap him out of it, causing Drago to also fully gain control of his powers and making Mag Mel and Razenoid lose their connection with Dan and Drago. Zenthon then starts attacking Drago and Drago determines that they will have to tame Zenthon in order to control him. Drago's Revolutional attack then goes up against Zenthon's lasers but Zenthon is unable to take it but Anubias's Iron Dragonoid and Venexus continue to attack Titanium Dragonoid. Zenthon then helps Drago by defeating Venexus and Drago then defeats the Iron Dragonoid causing Anubias having a chance to flee. Zenthon then disappears and Amazon say that both Dan and Drago work really impressive when they work together. Preyas and Amazon then vow to help Drago control his new powers. At the end of the episode, Mag Mel discusses Dan and Drago moving on since New Vestroia with Razenoid and Razen Titan is shown in the background.
| 153 | 10 | "A Royale Pain"; Transliteration: "Hokori takaki senshi" (Japanese: 誇り高き戦士) | April 17, 2011 (Canada); April 30, 2011 (USA) |
Shun has been battling far more frequently since taking the position of leader of the Brawlers, and it is starting to take its toll on him. However, he is more determined than ever to put a stop to the chaotic battling when Mechtogans are allowed in battles and Shun decides to enter the Battle Royale to stop them. Things get tough when he goes up against Robin from Team Anubias and Soon from Team Sellon, who each uses Bolcanon and Krowl, each equipped with their BakuNanos, Hyper Pulsor and Slicerix. Shun and Taylean fight them but start losing. Shun and Taylean fight on. However, Taylean spawns a Mechtogan called Silent Strike, making things even more complicated. Shun tries his best to defeat it to no avail, and Silent Strike defeats both Bolcanon and Krowl. Shun is then rescued by Rafe and Paige with their Bakugan, Boulderon and Wolfurio. After Silent Strike flees, Rafe and Paige reveal that they are a Neathian and Gundalian, respectively. They tell Shun and Marucho that the Mechtogan are the offspring of chaos when there is a lack of sync between a brawler and their Bakugan. They also say that Princess Fabia has sent them to learn from the Brawlers as well as helping them with their problem. Shun however, refuses their help and leaves while Marucho's father asks him to quit the Brawlers, surprising Marucho.
| 154 | 11 | "Back in Sync"; Transliteration: "Ketsudan no toki" (Japanese: 決断の時) | May 1, 2011 (Canada); May 7, 2011 (USA) |
Dan and Drago are trying to get full control of Zenthon, but fail. Then they attempt to fly up a cliff, but the strong wind pushes them down. Drago tells Dan that they are falling out of sync, but then they are paid a visit by their old friend Wavern as a spirit-voice who helps them. She tells them they have to help the Brawlers and get back in sync. Also, Paige and Rafe talk about the Brawlers as they were sent to be their students. Rafe says that he wanted to be like them after watching them battle against the Gundalian forces but realizes that they need to help them. Paige still doubts them. Meanwhile, Marucho is confronted by his father and must decide how to save Bakugan Interspace from further destruction. Marucho's father tells him to quit the Brawlers but after a talk from Trister, Marucho decides not to quit. In the cafe, Sellon and Anubias sit there as Sellon compares a wilting rose to the Battle Brawlers falling apart. Marucho and Trister also battle Jack Punt to prove to his dad that battling is his life and is okay for him. In the end, Marucho wins his battle, making his father and Kato proud. His dad decides that letting him battle is the best course of action. After watching Marucho's battle, Rafe and Paige comes to Marucho, and Rafe apologizes to Marucho for not believing in the capabilities of the Brawlers. Taylean thinks they should congratulate them but Shun just leaves and tells Taylean they have their own battles to worry about. At the end, Dan and Drago succeed in flying up the cliff, in the process getting fully back in sync. Then, Drago's long-lost beloved girlfriend Wavern appears as a disembodied spirit or ghost (as her true physical self had perished long ago) and congratulates them. Then, she tells them to find out the identity of the masked entity haunting their visions.
| 155 | 12 | "Mind Search"; Transliteration: "Hikari no sasu houhe" (Japanese: 光の射す方へ) | May 8, 2011 (Canada); May 14, 2011 (USA) |
The episode starts at a cave in New Vestroia, with Wavern telling Dan and Drago that the mystery to the entity in their nightmares will be solved in the cave. Then, Dan and Drago enter the cave. In Bakugan Interspace, there is a Capture the Flag competition in the Dungeon arena. Marucho tries to convince Paige and Rafe to try to not battle as much in the competition, but they take that as an insult and they leave angrily. Soon, Shun comes and tells Marucho that the only way to stop the chaos is to battle. Elsewhere, Sellon is seen contacting Mag Mel and informing him about the Capture the Flag challenge and he thinks that the Chaos Energy produced will be massive and he will be able to break out of his prison. Before the competition, Team Anubias meet up. Anubias gives Bolcanon to Robin, Krakenoid to Jack and Horridian to Ben. Anubias then states that he will not be participating in the competition. At the beginning of the competition, a brawler enters but is quickly defeated by a large group of brawlers using Chaos Bakugan. Then, Shun arrives with Taylean and defeats them. Meanwhile, Rafe and Paige are doing well until Ben comes with Horridian. Rafe and Ben use their BakuNano and attack each other. Paige joins in but then a beam from Hyper Pulsor comes and attacks them. Jack and Robin arrive but Marucho jumps in with Tristar and disappear in a giant wave with Paige and Rafe. Meanwhile, Dylan begins to wonder who will win since the participants are strong and even in terms of strength. Then, Shun arrives in another location and is attacked by Soon and Chris. They begin to insult Shun (Chris calls him an "emo twerp") and they use their Bakugan and BakuNano to battle Shun. Down in the sewers, Rafe and Paige complain that they didn't need Marucho's help. He tries to explain them that pure strength will not always lead to success. The two disagree but then they are ambushed by Jack. They begin to run but Marucho faints. Tristar explains that Marucho tried to plan the safest route with the least battles for 2 days and that tired him out, much to Rafe and Paige surprise, who underestimate Marucho's skills. Then, when they get closer to the flag, Ben and Robin are there. Jack then comes from behind and they all attack Tristar at once. However, Marucho uses an ability which acts as if Tristar wasn't there which leads the attacks to each other and Team Anubias loses. Also, Shun wins his battle against Soon and Chris. Marucho arrives at the temple, where the flag is at the top. There, Marucho sees Sellon who uses her BakuNano. Using her BakuNano, she manages to defeat Tristar but only before she finds out it was a distraction. Rafe with Wolfurio and Paige with Boulderon come out. As Boulderon runs up the temple, Sellon unleashes her Mechtogan, Braxion. Rafe succeeds in stalling for time as Paige gets the flag and the win goes to the Battle Brawlers. Then Marucho reveals his plan: He knew Shun would attract many Brawlers so there would be fewer people to brawl. Also, going through the sewers would reduce the amount of brawlers too and distracting Sellon was useful as the main objective was only to get the flag. After, Rafe goes on his knees and apologizes for underestimating him and being stubbornly rude to the Brawlers and wants Marucho to give him another chance to be his student. Then he convinces Paige to do the same and she unwillingly agrees and the 3 brawlers unite. Shun watches them, and comments that Marucho's plan was right all the time. Back in New Vestroia, Dan, Drago and Wavern see a rainbow light in the cave and they see Mag Mel and Razenoid telling them to battle more to give him more energy. They are teleported out of the cave and a mysterious yellow mark appears on Dan's hand and Drago's chest. They find out that the masked entity is called Mag Mel and the Bakugan with him is called Razenoid. Wavern says that the names are familiar but Dan knows what the light is- Code Eve. Where Mag Mel is locked up, he says he's glad that Dan remembers the source of the connection. Then, he states that Dan will eventually learn the power of their connection.
| 156 | 13 | "Reconnection"; Transliteration: "Kokoro no tabi" (Japanese: 心の旅) | May 15, 2011 (Canada); May 21, 2011 (USA) |
In the Cafe in Bakugan Interspace, Shun is trying to relax a little. Marucho then arrives, and tries to tell Shun that he is battling way too much and suggests a break on Earth. Shun gets angry, and says he doesn't need a break. Marucho then suggests battling him but Shun just leaves. Back on New Vestroia, Dan and Drago were talking about Code Eve. Wavern then asks who Code Eve is and they explain who she is. Wavern suggests looking through their memories. The first thing they see is when they first saw the Sacred Orb on Neathia. Then they are brought to the battle against Dharak Colossus and with Linehalt using his Forbidden Powers. After, they are brought to the final battle between Dharak and Drago. Finally, they are at the point where they are given the powers. They finally remember when Drago evolved. The feeling was the same as Drago losing control. They are brought back to New Vestroia. In Bakugan Interspace, Shun is in a championship battle and defeated a brawler with Cyclone Percival. Rafe and Paige talk about how Shun battles and how they are bad. He advances to the semi-finals to battle Anubias. It is also revealed that Sellon will face Marucho. Sellon and Anubias lose their battles which leads to Noah beginning to doubt why he likes Anubias. However, Ben reassures that he just threw the battle. The finals are Marucho vs. Shun. Shun appears to be winning but Marucho stays determined. Rafe and Paige discuss about Marucho's determination. Marucho then wins Round 1. Throughout the battle, Marucho tries to convince Shun to go back to his old ways. After losing both Round 2 and 3 to Shun, Marucho begins to cry but Shun became convinced and seen the error in his ways. Rafe talks about conflict bringing a stronger connection while Paige begins to be a fan of them. Sellon and Anubias talk, revealing that they just threw their battles. Sellon tells Anubias that with them as a team, they will be able to produce more energy for Mag Mel with Anubias not wanting to throw another battle. After seeing their memories, Drago begins to think that the evolution wasn't the error, that it was him, not being ready. Dan says that he is also to blame and they plan to train. Wavern hopes that they will find out that teamwork leads to success and disappears. Anubias and Sellon are seen reporting to Mag Mel. Mag Mel tells them that the reason Drago's powers haven't been mastered is because each Brawler and Bakugan have a connection code. After his evolution, Dan became a "key" and Drago became a "gate". He needs to retrieve it from New Vestroia. Anubias prepares to go but Mag Mel sends Sellon instead, angering Anubias. Sellon arrives at New Vestroia and changes into her true Neathian form.
| 157 | 14 | "Triple Threat"; Transliteration: "Kourin" (Japanese: 降臨) | May 22, 2011 (Canada); May 28, 2011 (USA) |
In Bakugan Interspace, Rafe and Paige win a battle, and the rank for the Battle Brawlers is going back up. With their new ranking, they will face off with Team Anubias in a 2 vs 2 match. Marucho vows to defeat them to get rid of the violence which leads to flashbacks of Bakugan using BakuNano. Meanwhile, on New Vestroia, Dan and Drago are training and they both think that they are in sync. Drago says that he wants to try a round with Zenthon. Drago then tries to summon Zenthon, however, during the process, Dan sees a violent vision of Razenoid commanding a whole bunch of Chaos Bakugan to attack Bakugan Interspace. Then, Razenoid summons a portal which leads to Bayview and attacks with a powerful attack. Dan is then about to faint but Drago catches him just on time. Afterwards, Sellon suddenly arrives, making an explanation of Dan's vision. The matchups for the battles against the Battle Brawlers and Team Anubias are Marucho and Shun vs Anubias and Robin and Rafe and Paige vs Jack and Ben. They only show the battle between Marucho and Shun vs Anubias and Robin. Anubias uses Horridian while Robin uses Bolcanon. While in New Vestroia, Sellon reveals she is working for Mag Mel but she doesn't reveal her identity due to a reason. She also says that the guy from before, Anubias, was also a servant but does not reveal his identity either and Dan was shocked. Sellon then commences the battle, summoning one Haos, one Ventus and one Subterra Iron Dragonoid while Dan uses Titanium Dragonoid. They are all quickly defeated by Titanium Dragonoid's Dragon Force Striker and Sellon said that was incredible. Then, Sellon summons six different attributed Flash Ingrams which all have BakuNano Shoxrox. Later, when Dan says that the only way to defeat all the six Flash Ingrams is to use Dragon Force Striker, Sellon's Haos Flash Ingram nullifies all Drago's abilities so Dan says if they can't use abilities, they have to summon Zenthon. They then focus to try to summon Zenthon and they are successful. The six Flash Ingrams then attack Zenthon with the BakuNano's but Zenthon retaliates by defeating five of the Flash Ingrams and Drago defeats one of them barehanded. Zenthon then speaks and thanks Dan and Drago for creating him and letting him do his job. Sellon then gets angry and summons three Mechtogan: Deezall, Rockfist and Miserak. Meanwhile, The battle begins in Bakugan Interspace as Anubias uses Horridian's BakuNano, Aeroblaze and Robin uses Bolcanon's BakuNano, Hyper Pulsor. During the battle between Dan and Sellon, Deezal, Rockfist and Miserak attack Zenthon brutally. Mag Mel is then seen getting massive amounts of Chaos Energy. Later when Miserak, Deezal and Rockfist activate their lasers, Dan is thrown back and sees a vision of Shun and Marucho vs Anubias and Robin. Zenthon then get attacked by Rockfist and Deezal when Zenthon is down. When Zenthon is down, Drago says that they're going to pay for that but Dan says to Drago, we have to stay in sync. They then convince Zenthon to get up and they then become all synchronized with each other. The bond between Dan, Titanium Dragonoid and Zenthon is used to summon a Mechtogan Titan called Zenthon Titan. Zenthon Titan then defeats Miserak, Deezal and Rockfist with ease and then Sellon tells Dan and Drago that they can keep their Gate and Key. Sellon also mentions that the end of the world is still coming and Dan and Drago ask whats she's talking about but she teleports back to Earth and reports back to master Mag Mel. During the other battle between Shun and Marucho vs Anubias and Robin, Shun and Taylean defeat Bolcanon with Horridian remaining. However, Mag Mel nearly has enough energy to break free and a scene of Mag Mel with Razenoid and Razen Titan is shown. Suddenly, rogue Chaos Bakugan start invading Bakugan Interspace and begin destroying everything in sight, while Anubias states: "It's the end!" with an evil smile.
| 158 | 15 | "Interspace Under Siege"; Transliteration: "Yatsu ga kuru" (Japanese: 奴が来る) | May 29, 2011 (Canada); June 4, 2011 (USA) |
In the ensuing chaos in Bakugan Interspace, the Brawlers wonder what to do. Rafe makes a note that it is only the Chaos Bakugan that are on a rampage. The Brawlers then summon their Bakugan to save Bakugan Interspace. Meanwhile, Anubias says to all the other members of Team Anubias, "We can't be the champions of this place if its destroyed" so Anubias has given Bolcanon to Ben and Krakenoid to Robin. Then they leave alongside Jack but Anubias stops Noah and gives him Horridian. Noah seems happy that Anubias gave Horridian to him with Anubias seeming concerned about his "student". Once they leave, Sellon mocks Anubias for his "concern" for Noah. He tells her to get lost. She reminds Anubias to focus with the task but Anubias mocks her for her failure against Dan and she then stops. As more and more Chaos Bakugan arrive, Marucho thinks of an idea and he decides to move all of them to Section B and delete the whole area, despite the fact that it will create huge damage in the system. Marucho then sends out an emergency evacuation but just before that Rafe gives Marucho Crosstriker for Tristar and gives Shun Hammermor for Taylean for the battle against the Chaos Bakugan. Then they, alongside Team Anubias, continue to try to move the Chaos Bakugan to Section B of Bakugan Interspace. Meanwhile, in some type of room, somebody receives a SOS message on his computer, which was sent by Marucho and a mysterious Bakugan is seen in the background. Back in Bakugan Interspace, the Brawlers keep bringing the Chaos Bakugan to Section B of Bakugan Interspace. They then have finally successfully led all the remaining Chaos Bakugan to Section B. Marucho then plans to fire up the erase sequence but Taylean and Shun notices that Team Anubias are still there and he tells Marucho and the others. Rafe then tells Marucho to not do it because it will delete them too and he doesn't. He then alerts them and they all run out of Area B but Noah is frozen in fear. Team Anubias just stays there with Noah. While Noah is frozen in fear, Mag Mel and Razenoid gain more energy to be free. Mag Mel then says, "That's right little boy, tremble with fear because fear feeds me as well as Chaos Energy." While on New Vestroia, Dan and Drago feel a power surge and that it is Bakugan Interspace calling for help so they decide to go back to Bakugan Interspace to help out their friends despite the risks. Just as things looked very bad, a streak of lightning and a Dimension Portal appears out of nowhere. While the lightning appears Rafe and Paige had no idea what it was, Shun thought it was more Chaos Bakugan and Marucho thought that it was help. Marucho is right and someone appears in the Dimension Portal. It happens to be an old friend of the brawlers from Vestal and it is none other than Spectra Phantom. Paige and Rafe wonder who he was, while Marucho reveals that he sent a SOS message to all of the Brawlers' allies which Spectra was the first one to receive. Spectra then says that the Chaos bakugan are a disgusting sight and then he says "Let's clean house" by Spectra sending out his new Guardian Bakugan called Darkus Infinity Helios. Also the Brawlers' were surprised that Helios had an attribute change. Spectra explains that Helios' next evolution required an attribute change. Then, Spectra and Helios decimate a massive amount of Chaos Bakugan but however, he gets hit by some Subterra Iron Dragonoids. In the smoke, Helios took no damage from the attack because Spectra activated Infinity Helios's new Farbras Ability, (FARBRAS Infinity) and after that Helios beats all of them. Shun and Marucho are impressed, Rafe and Pagie are amazed, Ben, Jack, Robin and Noah are shocked (the last even stating that Helios is "awesome"). Sellon is shown to be fascinated by Helios's power but not to the point of desire. However Anubias is angry. Then with a snap of his finger, Horridian, Bolcanon and Krakenoid jump out from Team Anubias who are in shock and start attacking Infinity Helios. The Brawlers successfully take them down with their brand new BakuNanos that Rafe gave them but Team Sellon's Bakugan come out of nowhere, alongside another bunch of Chaos Bakugan. Then Anubias senses Dan's arrival as he and Drago, arrive back to assist Spectra and the rest of the Brawlers as the chaos continues.
| 159 | 16 | "A Hero Returns"; Transliteration: "Fukkatsu no hi" (Japanese: 復活の日) | June 5, 2011 (Canada); June 11, 2011 (USA) |
Dan finally returns to Bakugan Interspace to help the Battle Brawlers in their battle against the Chaos Bakugan with his friends and Drago battles Anubias's Horridian, Bolcanon, Krakenoid, Sellon's Krowl, Spyron and Vertexx, while he is able to weaken them in the progress. While Drago is battling, Spectra Phantom and Infinity Helios were impressed of Drago's new power. Also, Rafe and Paige were scared about how much power that Drago had. Later, when Dan says to Drago that he should finish it, Drago summons Mechtogan Zenthon but Marucho and Shun were worried that Zenthon might destroy the place and also the Brawlers too. Zenthon and Drago start defeating a whole bunch of Chaos Bakugan but then, Dan suddenly has a vision of Mag Mel which causes Dan and Drago to go out of sync and they are unable to control Zenthon and he starts attacking Bakugan Interspace. Zenthon also defeats Marucho's Infinity Trister, Rafe's Wolfurio, Paige's Boulderon, Spectra's Infinity Helios and Shun's Taylean in one blow and they all turn back into their ball form. Later after that Zenthon disappears and Anubias summons BakuNano Aeroblaze, BakuNano Hyper Pulsor, BakuNano Daftorix, BakuNano Slicerix, BakuNano Jamsaber and BakuNano Orehammer for Team Anubias' Bakugan and Team Sellon' Bakugan. Drago is then defeated by all of them due to being a six on one fight and they had BakuNano's but when Dan was about to throw Drago back into the battle, Marucho stops him and sends back the brawlers alongside Dan into the interior of Bakugan Interspace. Marucho then deletes Area B and all of the Chaos Bakugan are deleted. Spectra was really disappointed and sad about Dan's attitude and decides to leaves the Brawlers temporarily. Meanwhile, Shun believes that Dan has no right to boss them around again due to him leaving. Dan then tells them he went to train at New Vestroia and they were all shocked. Dan also said all their training paid off but Paige and Rafe didn't believe them because they weren't able to control Mechtogan Zenthon. Drago then tells Dan they should tell them the truth and he does. He tells the Brawlers about the connection he has with Mag Mel and Razenoid and they will have to decide if they should take him in again after he abandoned them. Rafe and Paige seem to be disappointed about Dan's attitude towards Marucho, after he knew that he was the leader while Dan wasn't with the Brawlers and they decide to acknowledge Marucho as the leader. Dan later leaves after Marucho yelled at him and Shun also leaves talking to Taylean about Dan and he bangs a wall. In other point, because of Titanium Dragonoid's Mechtogan, Zenthon, Mag Mel and Razenoid finally have enough power to get free. They destroy their chains and a castle comes out of the ground on Gundalia. Razenoid also spawns a whole bunch of Chaos Bakugan and Mag Mel then commands his Chaos Bakugan to attack the place. That night, in Dan's house which is located in Bayview, he sees a vision of Gundalian Soldiers trying to hold off the Chaos Bakugan. The next day, Marucho, Shun, Rafe and Paige were talking about the Chaos Bakugan disappearing and Marucho didn't buy it. Dan then arrives and tells the Brawlers' about Gundalia, which surprised Paige because her homeland was attacked by the Chaos Bakugan but they all didn't believe it and Paige said: Why should we believe it?, then she said Dan was a crazy person. They then believe Dan when Paige receives a message from a Gundalian. Paige then says that she has to go to save her people but Marucho says that the brawlers and himself will come too. Dan offers to go with them to Gundalia, but she and the Brawlers say no; however, Dan said he has to go because he's the original brawler and this fight involves him too.
| 160 | 17 | "Gundalia Under Fire"; Transliteration: "Senka no kanata" (Japanese: 戦火のかなた) | June 12, 2011 (Canada); June 18, 2011 (USA) |
Before the episode begins with the Battle Brawlers going through a Dimension Portal, to get to Gundalia, Dan goes with the other Brawlers because this fight involves him too. Once they arrive, they arrive at the city lines and see a desolate land which used to have homes. Later, two Gundalian guards confront them. Marucho says they are from Earth and they are the Battle Brawlers, Paige says that she is a Gundalian and Rafe says that he is a Castle Knight, but the guards don't believe them. Then, Ren arrives and says they are his friends. They find out he is now the leader of the Gundalian Forces. Ren then brings them to a secret hideout. When they arrive there, they receive a message from Nurzak, who has become the first Prime Minister of Gundalia. He welcomes the Brawlers and he is happy to see them back. Then he asks if Paige has been a good student and she concurs, which delights him. Then, Nurzak explain how a castle had emerged from underground out of nowhere, and an evil person called Mag Mel, with his brutish Bakugan, Razenoid, started it all. Then, Fabia Sheen appears on the screen in her Human Form and the Brawlers seem happy to see her once again. Rafe bows down as he reveals to Dan Kuso and the brawlers that she became the Queen while the former Queen (Serena Sheen), became the Ambassador of Gundalia and Neathia, surprising the Brawlers. Nurzak then says that he doesn't know why they came and attacked Gundalia so they had to fight and Queen Fabia said that the Castle Knights are coming to help the Gundalians in their fight against Mag Mel and Razenoid. Prime Minister Nurzak and Queen Fabia then leave. Ren then tells them that Chaos Bakugan are probably going to the center of Gundalia, where the Royal Palace is. Everyone then agrees with Ren but then Dan wants to help because he has a connection with Mag Mel and Razenoid however, Marucho tries to get Dan to sit this one out because of what happened before, and they end up arguing. Then, Ren asks if he should know anything about them fighting but they don't say that it's nothing. Later, Ren shows the Brawlers a map of the city lines but Dan feels a vision who shows Mag Mel with Razenoid and the army of Chaos Bakugan going North through a place called Dalia's Valley. Dan then says that Mag Mel and Razenoid are going North through Dalia's Valley. Ren knows that the Valley and it goes straight to the Royale Palace. Ren then asks Dan how he knows this and reveals to Ren and the Gundalian Soldiers that he is linked with Mag Mel and Razenoid. The Gundalian Soldiers don't trust Dan because he has a link with Mag Mel but Dan says that he can be trusted and Ren assures with a little bit of doubt. Marucho then devises and prepares a plan for an ambush. At the valley, the group waits for Mag Mel to arrive and Dan experiences some pain in his head. However, they are the ones to get attacked by surprise from the sky. Rafe decides to give the BakuNano Sonicanon to Dan and the battle begins with all the Brawlers using BakuNano and as they and Ren attack, Razenoid rises from the ground. They are stunned as Mag Mel arrives revealing that he can see visions of Dan too, so he knew about the attack. He attacks and eliminates all except for Dan, who begins to charge at Mag Mel but both of them hear a high pitch sound. Mag Mel believes their psychic connection creates high frequencies when they are too close. They both summon their Mechtogan, each with their own battle phrase. They and their Bakugan fight. After they fight, the result of an explosion leads to Dan losing. Mag Mel walks over to get the gate and key but is attacked by Neathian forces led by Captain Elright, Aranaut on Rapilator, and an army of Haos Raptorix. Mag Mel and the Brawlers leave, but not before Marucho hears Mag Mel mention the "gate and key". The Gundalian Soldiers begin to doubt Dan Kuso because of his link with Mag Mel and Razenoid. Ren assures them that he is not spy for Mag Mel but he has his own doubts. Dan is angry that Mag Mel used him and Dan punches a wall, while Rafe discusses security upgrades because of the connection. At the end, Marucho looks at Dan with a deeply worried look.
| 161 | 18 | "Battle Lines"; Transliteration: "Surechigau omoi" (Japanese: すれ違う想い) | June 19, 2011 (Canada); June 25, 2011 (USA) |
The episode begins with the Gundalian soldiers fighting back against the Chaos Bakugan. It seems that the Chaos Bakugan are defeating a huge amount of Gundalian Bakugan. The Gundalians then try to get revenge on the Chaos Bakugan and are starting to gain the upper hand but suddenly, all of them are all defeated by a Aquos-Darkus hybrid Cyclone Percival and a Pyrus-Darkus hybrid Iron Dragonoid owned by Sellon and Anubias. When they finished off the Gundalian's Bakugan, Anubias wondered where Dan is. Back at the base in Gundalia, the battle brawlers find out that the Chaos Bakugan are all heading to the city area, where there are Gundalians defending the area such as Mason and Jesse from Gundalian Invaders. Ren concludes that they are properly heading to Neathia so they can invade them next, as there is a Dimension Transporter in the area. They also think Mag Mel is hiding underground in his castle while he commands the Chaos Bakugan to attack Gundalia. Paige is eager to initiate a sneak attack but Captain Elright reminds her how the previous attempt ended. Dan insists to fight against Mag Mel but Marucho tells him not to, calling him a liability. Dan gets extremely frustrated and grabs Marucho by the collar and yells at him, that he has saved him over the past few years. He didn't stop until Rafe told him that it was enough. The group except for Dan leave as they hear that the Chaos Bakugan were invading the city lines. Taylean is on Zoompha while Shun is thinking. The city is under fire as the group continues to fight off the Chaos Bakugan. Dan then experiences another vision which shows Mag Mel telling Dan to surrender the Gate and Key, he desires. Dan then remember the phrase from the woman that they fought on New Vestroia before. They then leave by their selves on Zoompha but are interrupted by Shun and Taylean. Shun then asks what Dan is doing here and flips him. He then lectures him that he didn't change while he went to New Vestroia and then asks him to come with him. Dan gets up and then flips Shun. They then begin to fight but are attacked by an Army of Chaos Bakugan led by Anubias and they destroy both Titanium Dragonoid's and Taylean's Mobile Assault (Zoompha). Dan then uses BakuNano Sonicannon and they fight back alongside Shun. They are doing very well and defeat a large amount of Chaos Bakugan, but then Anubias summons Miserak and Venexus, so Dan and Drago summon Zenthon. Drago and Zenthon fight Miserak and Venexus but a swarm of Chaos Bakugan go after Drago, so Shun decides to use Hammermor and they fight them back. Later, Anubias summons Smasheon and defeats Taylean which hurts Shun. Dan, Drago and Zenthon then summon Zenthon Titan for extra help. He then fights against Smasheon and Venexus. Titanium Dragonoid then defeats Miserak with his Wonder Superior attack but Sellon arrives out of nowhere and summons Deezall, Rockfist and Braxion. They continue to fight and Drago defeats Braxion with the same attack easily. When Deezall and Rockfist are about to try to defeat Zenthon Titan they are both defeated by a long range shot by Marucho and Tristar with Cannongear who hacked Rafe's Mobile Assault to use as a Cannon and upgraded its power for Mechtogan targets. Smasheon then gets defeated by Zenthon and Venexus gets easily defeated by Zenthon Titan. Anubias then faints because of the power needed to control three Mechtogans at a time. Sellon then carries him and teleports back to Mag Mel's Castle. Dan begins to thank him but Marucho gets angry because he did not follow his orders as Team Leader. Dan and Marucho then argue but then Ren messages Marucho that they cannot find Paige and Rafe. They then think that their gone after Mag Mel and they find them trying to sneak into Mag Mel's Castle just as they thought. The group begin to argue, but a Ventus Flash Ingram blasts them and they fall into a chasm below.
| 162 | 19 | "Unlocking the Gate"; Transliteration: "Hakuginjō no taiketsu" (Japanese: 白銀城の対決) | June 26, 2011 (Canada); July 2, 2011 (USA) |
Dan With the war turning on the Chaos Bakugan, Linehalt, Aranaut, and the other Bakugan are trying to defend against them. While that is happening, Nurzak and Fabia talk about the War between Mag Mel and Gundalia. Nurzak speaks up and says that their next target will be Neathia if they are able to take Gundalia down. Fabia ensures him that the Battle Brawlers will definitely succeed because the Sacred Orb chose them. After the fall, Rafe and Dan get separated from Shun, Marucho and Paige. The Chaos Bakugan come after them and Rafe doesn't know what to do, wishing that Marucho and Shun were there to help them. Dan then tells Rafe that he will handle it and tells Drago to use Dragon Blazer on the roof and rocks tumble down which trap the Chaos Bakugan. Rafe is then amazed about what Dan and Drago just did and asks how he knew that. Dan says that he has learnt some things over the past few years. Dan then decides to go after Mag Mel and Razenoid. Rafe is suggesting that he should follow Dan, but Dan rejects the idea. Rafe then get mad and Dan explains everything to Rafe including the Gate and Key they have. Rafe then asks what is the Gate and Key and Drago say that their not really sure themselves. In the end, Dan becomes convinced and decides to trust his friends. He also realizes that they were trying to help him. Dan then tells Rafe to go to find the other Brawlers so they can help him while Dan goes after Mag Mel himself. Meanwhile, the rest of the team is having trouble during the battle against the Chaos Bakugan and Marucho wishes that Dan was here. Rafe then arrives and uses a BakuLaunch to throw Wolfurio which he is able to defeat most of them. Taylean then defeats the rest with Slash Rise Thunder. Rafe then says that Dan went to look for Mag Mel and the Brawlers say that he just mad because Marucho is now the Leader of the Battle Brawlers. Rafe then says it is more than that and he truly cares for the Brawlers. Shun then asks if he heard right and Marucho starts to cry. Rafe also mentions about the Gate and Key which Marucho remembers hearing Mag Mel mentioning it and he knew that he would be after it. Dan eventually finds Mag Mel and the masked villain explains the origin of their links. Mag Mel says that his link is a mutated link from Code Eve and his Gate and Key are incomplete. Also Mag Mel and Razenoid share their bond with Dan and Drago because they are from the same origin. He needs the Gate and Key from Titanium Dragonoid and Dan to become whole again alongside Razenoid and possibly become more powerful than Code Eve so he can rule all Bakugan in the world. He then summons six Mechtogan: Braxion, Smasheon, Rockfist, Deezall, Venexus, and Miserak with just a point to the sky. Sellon and Anubias appear when the six Mechtogan are summoned and at the nick of time, the rest of the Brawlers arrive. All the Brawlers forgive the differences with Dan who begins to battle against Mag Mel. The Mechtogan overwhelm the others so Dan and Drago share their powers with the others and to make them summon their own Mechtogan: Silent Strike for Taylean (Shun), Vexfist for Boulderon (Paige), Accelerak for Trister (Marucho) and Swift Sweep for Wolfurio (Rafe). Mag Mel then says that he is not smart to share his powers with the other Brawlers so he and Razenoid summon Dreadeon, while Dan and Drago summon Zenthon. They begin to fight as the brawlers Mechtogon defeat the opposing Mechtogan except for Smasheon and Rockfist. Mag Mel orders Smasheon and Rockfist to fight Dan but suddenly, the Vestal Destroyer appears with Spectra Phantom, Infinity Helios and his BakuNano, Bombaplode defeating the two Mechtogan. Mag Mel then summons more Chaos Bakugan and Razenoid kicks Drago down. He begins to take the Gate from Drago, but is stopped by him. He and Dan then activated the Gate and Key. They then use an ability which seemingly destroys them. The war ended with Gundalia safe and Dan awaits for his punishment. However, Shun instead welcomes Dan back to the team, returning to be the leader of the Brawlers and counting with the support of Marucho and Spectra, who returns to Vestal in his ship. Everyone is happy, but suddenly, Drago's Gate appears and is changing color from light to dark constantly. He then feels that Razenoid is still alive and it is revealed that he took a fragment of the Gate's immense power and became whole. Mag Mel then awaits to take the Key's immense energy and power from Dan, in order to become whole again and achieve his goal.
| 163 | 20 | "True Colors"; Transliteration: "Konran" (Japanese: 混乱) | July 3, 2011 (Canada); July 9, 2011 (USA) |
After the battle in Gundalia, Mag Mel desires the Key from Dan even more now. He also mentions that Razenoid will soon awaken (where he is inside some sort of cocoon) and he will soon become fully whole. Mag Mel then sends Anubias and Sellon to retrieve it. As Sellon desires to look good in front of Mag Mel, Anubias desires to destroy Dan. While Mag Mel is sending Anubias and Sellon to retrieve the Key from Dan, Queen Fabia and Nurzak thank the Battle Brawlers for their work against Mag Mel. Afterwards, Marucho then get a distress call on his BakuMeter, coming from Bakugan Interspace. The Battle Brawlers then say they have to go and Nurzak and Queen Fabia say if they need any help from Gundalia or Neathia just come and ask. They then head through a Dimension Portal but at the end, there is an electrical shock which makes them have a very hard landing. On arrival, they see Bakugan Interspace in ruins, then find Team Anubias running from a Darkus Cyclone Percival. Ben tries to be brave and throws a brick at the Cyclone Percival while he tells his teammates to go ahead and he will catch up. The rest of them run away and the Darkus Cyclone Percival then fires an attack and Ben falls down. When the Cyclone Percival is about to finish off Ben, he is saved by Drago's Dragon Blazer attack. The rest of the team arrives including Team Anubias and Dylan mysteriously appears. Dylan also somehow knows information about Mag Mel. Meanwhile, outside of Bakugan Interspace, Kato and Marucho's father try to find a point to get any remaining battlers out of the system. Team Anubias then shows the Brawlers that they managed to round up the remaining battlers into a room. All of a sudden, Chris and Soon fall through the roof and land in the same place. Dylan then explains that hours after the Brawlers headed to Gundalia, the Chaos Bakugan began to invade Bakugan Interspace again. He also said that some noble brawlers tried to fend them off but they were unsuccessful. Marucho then realizes that because the Chaos Bakugan were destroying the area, the mainframe was damaged and that's why nobody can't get out. Luckily Kato finds another teleporter that is still intact and sends it to Marucho. Marucho then tells everyone and everyone then agrees to go there. Chris is also very worried about Sellon and says to Soon that they should send a message to her about where they are going. Soon says it is a great idea and she sends the message to Sellon. Since the Chaos Bakugan are in the center of Interspace, they plan to go around the area. Dylan appears again and begins to taunt the Brawlers. The group get furious at him and he reveals it is his job. He then removes his glasses, revealing green cybernetic eyes and exposing his identity as an artificial intelligence created alongside Bakugan Interspace. Dylan states that he engineered the BakuNanos and Battle Gear to amplify the energy intensity within Interspace and that he was blindly created by Marucho (This is also implys that Dylan probably works for Mag Mel as well). The Chaos Bakugan then find them but they are saved by Horridian. Anubias and Sellon arrive and their eponymous teams are happy to see them. However, their Leaders mock them for being stupid and they turn into their Real Forms. They insult their teammates which hurts Noah a lot and they reveal that they are Artificial Beings created by Mag Mel to aid him with his resurrection, as well as revealing they deceived Dan Kuso, Shun Kazami and the others (including their perspective teams) into doing that. They begin a fight after Rafe and Paige escort the battlers to the Access Point. Anubias and Sellon use their "Team's" Bakugan and the Brawlers try to protect the Key. Anubias then tries to destroy Dan and Sellon tells him that their trying to retrieve the Key not blowing it away. He stubbornly says Sellon to be quiet and summons Deezall and Rockfist. They then attack them but Rafe and Paige come and summon Vexfist and Swift Sweep. The groups then fight and defeat Sellon and Anubias. The final blow from Shun against Sellon caused them to teleport away. The group arrives at the access point but now the point was damaged because of Shun and he apologizes. The other battlers start to lose hope and it begins to rain in Interspace. The problem is, Interspace wasn't programmed to rain, and yet there was something unusual going on at the same time.
| 164 | 21 | "Dangerous Beauty"; Transliteration: "Utsukushiki sekai" (Japanese: 美しき世界) | July 10, 2011 (Canada); July 16, 2011 (USA) |
During the rain in Bakugan Interspace, there is a shadow of a weakened Sellon hobbling. There is also a flashback of when Mag Mel created her and Anubias. Spyron then comes to hunt her down to bring her back to Mag Mel but is luckily saved by Chris and Soon. Meanwhile, Marucho is still trying to repair the access point but Rafe alerts them of Chris and Soon arriving with Sellon. Soon and Chris explain what happened but the Brawlers say that she can't be trusted and they begin to argue with them. Shun arrives to harshly say to ditch her but then, she suddenly turns into her true form to attack a hidden Pyrus/Darkus Flash Ingram. Shun then battles it and Sellon gives a tip to attack the horn. Shun manages to destroy it and Sellon reveals that she doesn't want to leave because of her inspiration coming from her teammates. Then, Marucho's BakuColar shows that there is an army of Chaos Bakugan coming with Braxion, Miserak and Rockfist. Dan, Rafe and Paige head out first while Shun and Marucho stay behind to find more information about Mag Mel. When Dan arrives he summons Zenthon which quickly defeats a lot of Chaos Bakugan and Drago defeats Rockfist with no trouble at all. However, Rafe and Paige are having a little trouble with the Chaos Bakugan. Marucho reminds them to attack their horn and they are then successful. Shun, still distrustful, is keeping a close eye on Sellon through a security camera just in case she does anything evil. Zenthon and Drago have defeated every Chaos Bakugan and Mechtogan except Braxion but reinforcements come to attack the battlers who are hiding. Shun then heads there to help them while Sellon asks Soon and Chris for a favor. During the battle, Dan gets a transmission from Marucho who says Sellon has a message. Sellon says that she needs to tell Dan something really important about the link between him and Mag Mel in person. As Dan is heading there, Shun summons Silent Strike to help. Dan then arrives to see Sellon lying on the ground. As he comes to help, she reveals that she tricked them and turns into her true form. She knocks Dan and Drago to the wall and takes the Key! Suddenly, Shun arrives and the pursuing battle begins. Sellon says they are alike but that makes Shun very angry and Taylean then defeats Spyron, Vertexx and Krowl. Sellon then flies away and tries teleports back to Mag Mel. Shun tries to stop her but is held back by Chris and Soon. Sellon thanks them and starts revealing Mag Mel's true plan, which ends up having Soon and Chris betrayed once again. She goes through a Dimensional Gate and the Bakugan fall back. Mag Mel is pleased that he finally has the key. He then absorbs Sellon's energy despite her success and her pleading. Dan is angry that he had been duped as Anubias looks from far off on building, then jumps off. Title reference: A romantic-drama film is titled Dangerous Beauty.
| 165 | 22 | "Unfinished Business"; Transliteration: "Saigo no negai" (Japanese: 最後の願い) | July 17, 2011 (Canada); July 23, 2011 (USA) |
Having both the Gate and the Key, Mag Mel is very close to his resurrection. However, he still only needs Dan's portion of Code Eve in order to begin his plan. Meanwhile, Dan and Shun are continuing to defend Bakugan Interspace against the Chaos Bakugan. Shun then comments that now that Mag Mel has both the Gate and the Key, they need to find out what his next move is. Dan agrees and suggests that they should to take down the Chaos Bakugan twice as fast so they can find Mag Mel. They then hear some more Chaos Bakugan arriving, so they split up to take them out. Meanwhile, Team Anubias is trying to find a way to escape. Jack then humorously reflects on how Anubias tricked them (while being happy he's out of Anubias's sight), much to the dismay his teammates. Ben says, to not mention Anubias name again and as Robin declares that Anubias is gone, and that they are on their own now. Then suddenly, Anubias arrives and kidnaps Noah without anyone noticing. As Drago defeats the last Chaos Bakugan that is there, Dan receives a transmission from Noah, but is shocked to see Anubias on the other end. Anubias then tells Dan to meet him in the arena in the middle of Bakugan Interspace so they can settle their score as the former's payback against the latter for the humiliation. Shun and Taylean overhear this conversation and Taylean wonders if they should stop him from going, but Shun does not answer. Meanwhile, Anubias decides to free Noah, having already goaded Dan into battling, but Noah unsuccessfully attempted to reason with him. Dan then arrives for the battle, and Noah and Shun watch. Anubias then throws out Horridian, Bolcanon, and Krakenoid and Dan throws out Drago. Drago manages to make quick work of Bolcanon and Horridian, but Anubias suddenly throws out Krowl, much to Dan and Drago's surprise. Anubias then fuses the two into Mutant Krakenoid and Mutant Krowl. Mutant Krowl then traps Drago with Haos Hydra. Dan and Drago respond by summoning Zenthon and he frees Drago and defeats Mutant Krowl. Anubias then summons Smasheon, Venexus and Deezall. Dan then summons Zenthon Titan, who easily defeats Smasheon and Deezall. Anubias then summons Venexus Titan, and he and Zenthon Titan begin fighting, but are evenly matched. Determined not to lose, Anubias pushes his power to his limits and destroys the bracelet on his arm. Mag Mel then receives a surge of energy from the battle and steps in to absorb his energy. Shun tries to stop Dan from trying to save Anubias as he would get absorbed as well, but Dan goes anyway and is unable to do anything as Mag Mel is too strong for Anubias, but before he is consumed by Mag Mel, Anubias reconciles with Dan and Noah for his behavior and actions. Back on Interspace, Noah still can't believe that Anubias is really gone for good, while Dan consumes too much anger and hatred for revenge and decides to destroy Mag Mel for his series of sins once and for all.
| 166 | 23 | "Behind the Mask"; Transliteration: "Kamen no shoutai" (Japanese: 仮面の正体) | July 24, 2011 (Canada); July 30, 2011 (USA) |
Still stuck in Bakugan Interspace, Dan and the other Brawlers are fighting off the Chaos Bakugan. Dan then has a vision that shows Mag Mel's desire to attack Earth, using Bakugan Interspace as a base for his operations. He tells the other Brawlers about this vision and suggests using his link to find and attack him. The others, however, disagree because of the many risks, including becoming comatose. He still takes this risk and goes ahead with the others defending, while Marucho tries to find a way out. In another area, Soon and Chris have lost confidence since Sellon's departure, with Soon more upset. They are then attacked by a Flash Ingram, but are saved by Noah and his Subterra Ziperator. Chris is surprised to see that he has become more confident, and although Soon says that they don't want his help, calling him a cowardly crybaby, Noah continues helping them. More Chaos Bakugan come, but the rest of Noah's team, Ben, Jack and Robin, arrive on Pyrus, Aquos and Ventus Ziperators, respectively. Soon doesn't believe that they have anything to fight for, after the people they trusted betrayed them, but Ben reassures her and the two girls run to the Battle Brawlers base. As Dan tries to clear his mind and look for Mag Mel, he finds him in a "flip-side" of Bakugan Interspace. The two begin to battle, summoning their Mechtogan and the two summon blades to fight each other. Outside the base, the two girls are attacked again, with Soon wanting to be killed by the Chaos Bakugan, but the Brawlers step in and fight. As more spawn from the ground, Noah and the others come to help. Rafe tells them that their main priority is to protect Dan, who is no longer conscious, and the two girls regain their confidence and attempt to join the fight. Back in the control room, Marucho still can't find a way out or to contact the outside world, but Dylan appears and says no human can do it. With that, Marucho realizes that as an AI, Dylan could do it. Shun helped Soon and Chris regain their passion for brawling, as his battling style reminded them of Sellon's ability and grace, and they used their own Bakugan to help defeat the Chaos Bakugan. In the flip world, Dan continues to fight and manages to crack Mag Mel's mask, revealing him to be a reincarnation of Barodius. Mag Mel reveals that despite being killed as Barodius by Code Eve and latter his spirit banished and imprisoned by her, he still had a link with Dan. He managed to achieve enough power to break free of the shackles and prison from Code Eve. Razenoid says he was once Dharak before his reincarnation. They continue to and summon their Mechtogan Titans. After an explosion, Dan wakes up with the Brawlers and the others in front of him. He tells them where he is and who Mag Mel is leaving all of them shocked. Meanwhile, Marucho works on Interspace and gets Dylan to do the final job, revealing that his lollipop is a key. Marucho manages to get contact with Kato and his father and he reveals his plan to them.
| 167 | 24 | "Interspace Armageddon"; Transliteration: "Chikyuu" (Japanese: 地球) | July 31, 2011 (Canada); August 6, 2011 (USA) |
With everybody gathered in the control room, Marucho explains his plan to delete Bakugan Interspace in order to prevent Mag Mel from getting to Earth, called the plan "Interspace Armageddon". He also says that Kato and his father, Kyosuke, are working very hard to reboot an access point. They then split into two groups: One group distracts the Chaos Bakugan while the other tries to round up the remaining battlers. Once they rounded all the battlers, the two groups meet up at the access point. The access point is then activated along with the deletion program. However, since Dylan doesn't want to be dead, he tells the Chaos Bakugan where the Brawlers were and they arrive there along with Dreadeon clones and the former Bakugan of Team Anubias and Team Sellon. The Brawlers fight them off but more Mechtogan arrive as some of the battlers begin to leave as they try to defeat the Bakugan, who attacks the BI and Krakenoid and Krowl mutate to form Mutant Krakenoid. The Bakugan prove too much but a Mechtogan attacks from the sky. The Brawlers has never seen it before and begin to wonder who it is until Infinity Helios appears and says that it is his Mechtogan, Slynix. Also, alongside him, Spectra Phantom comes to give a hand. With his addition, they are defeating many of the Dreadeon clones. However, Mutant Krakenoid switches into Mutant Krowl and uses Haos Hydra to trap Helios. Then, Venexus Titan is summoned and the Dreadeon clones makes a portal to summon Mag Mel. Drago suggests to do a mutation and Rafe explains that he can only mutate with a Bakugan of the same power level. Dan and Spectra accept the challenge and gives his forces to Drago and Helios to mutate and form Mercury Dragonoid and Mutant Helios; together managed to destroy the remaining Chaos Bakugan and Mechtogan and they destroy the portal. Everyone else stay apart except for Dan and Spectra. Kato discovers a problem in the BI and more Dreadeon clones arrive. Spectra tells Dan to leave to continue battling with Helios, Dan leaves yelling his name and when he returns to the control room, the deletion begins leaving all the Dreadeon clones, Dylan, Spectra and Helios trapped inside of them. The Brawlers mourn their loss and they look outside, as many people think they see a dark moon, the Brawlers really know that it is Mag Mel, who he has actually absorbed the energy from the deletion program and the catharsis was completed, revealing an Evolved Razenoid.
| 168 | 25 | "Dark Moon"; Transliteration: "Kuroi tsuki" (Japanese: 黒い月) | August 7, 2011 (Canada); August 13, 2011 (USA) |
With Razenoid's transformation complete, Mag Mel decides to put all the humans into the dark reverse dimension of Earth to torture them. Meanwhile, the Dark Moon sends out energy waves, which transfer all the non battlers to the reverse dimension. He also summons five different attributed Razen Titans to the five biggest cities on Earth to drill holes into the Earth's core which will result in the Earth blowing up. He then appears in the sky as a vision to all that he will do the same to all opposing forces including Gundalia, Neathia, Vestal and New Vestroia. The Brawlers decide to split up and hunt down the Mechtogan Titans but this proves not to be simple as there are armies of Chaos Bakugan and Dreadeon Clones as protectors. The battle begins with the Brawlers summoning their Mechtogan, Dan and Drago with the addition of Rapilator defeat the first one, and Shun summons Faser Titan to defeat another one. As the battle continues Rafe and Paige are having difficulty but then, the Vestal Destroyer arrives with Spectra Phantom, Infinity Helios and Gus Grav on the bridge. He then comes to assist them and they defeat another Razen Titan. After this, he with Dan and Shun then come together to face three more Razen Titans. Spectra then suggests another mutation among Helios, Drago and Taylean. They accept this and form Mercury Dragonoid, Mutant Helios and Mutant Taylean. They then defeat many Chaos Bakugan and they merge back to their original forms. Then, Drago and Taylean mutate again and deal some more damage to the Razen Titans. Mag Mel retaliates by not only summoning more Razen Titans but also arrives with the evolved Razenoid too. He then binds Dan and Drago with Darkus Energy and the Brawlers Mechtogan fight back. However, Razenoid proves to be too strong and manages to survive and defeat all of their Mechtogan. Spectra tells Gus to send the data for the Bakugan Battle Suits over; Doomtronic for Helios and Blasterate for Taylean. The two manage to break Razenoid's shield and knock him back but he manages to survive and attacks everyone, including the Brawlers themselves. Mag Mel begins to taunt Dan by attacking the other Brawlers and Marucho forms a small plan. Taylean and Helios then attack Razenoid while Tristar reminds Dan and Drago about the Gate and Key which since they have, can possibly close the Dark Moon. Razenoid then blasts Tristar who gets up later as Dan and Drago fly up to the Moon after breaking free with Mag Mel and Razenoid coming from behind. The destiny of the Earth is on the hands of Dan and Drago as mentioned by Spectra.
| 169 | 26 | "The Final Takedown"; Transliteration: "Unmei no tatakai" (Japanese: 運命の戦い) | August 14, 2011 (Canada); August 20, 2011 (USA) |
The final battle continues with Dan and Mag Mel, while the others are fighting the remaining Bakugan, Mechtogan, and Mechtogan Titans on Earth. Razenoid and Drago continue to fight and Drago is about to get hit, but Zenthon and Zenthon Titan come to protect Dan and Drago. Mag Mel and Razenoid then summon Dreadeon and Razen Titan (called Dreadeon Titan) and they continue to fight. Dan and Drago tell them that they should only be fighting them not the innocent but Mag Mel responds as it is an act of revenge against for Dan for humiliating him and having his previous life as Barodius destroyed, and he doesn't care about nobility or anything good. On Earth, the drilling has gone to 70% and Spectra and Gus go attack. Shun summons Faser Titan to help while some fear there are too many. Marucho reassures them as Rafe and Paige continue to fight. Mag Mel begins to taunt Dan and he manages to get them to fall down. He tries to get Dreadeon and Razen Titan to kill them but Zenthon and Zenthon Titan defend them. However, the residual energy created from them caused an outburst of energy which not only destroys them but Razenoid absorbs it to become bigger and stronger. With the drilling up to 85%, the battling continues with more Titans being destroyed. Dan and Drago, however, are not doing as well as Mag Mel tells them about the energy collected from Bakugan Interspace. Noah sees the spirit of Anubias inspiring him to fight on and telling him how much he grown. Chris and Soon then hear Sellon's voice and run towards it. Dan and Drago then receive power from the gate and key while Razenoid blasts Drago. When the smoke clears, Titanium Dragonoid has evolved into Fusion Dragonoid! Razenoid then tries to aim at Drago but he constantly misses. He fires at Razenoid which manages to slay him and breaking the gate and key of them. Mag Mel is about to disappear like Razenoid but not before saying that Dan is still doomed and that a new enemy will target him and Drago. On Earth, all the Chaos Bakugan, Mechtogan, and Mechtogan Titans disappear along with the Dark Moon. Everyone else returned confused as shimmering dust falls from the sky. The Battle Brawlers then believe that Dan and Drago sacrificed themselves but then in a glowing light, Dan and Drago appear. Everybody is happy and ask him what happened with Dylan (who survived and ended up living on Earth as a human) walking away with his signature lollipop. They asked how was the battle and Dan responds with it being easy. The episode then ends with Dan's signature nose flick and says "Yes, no big deal".
| 170 | 27 | "Evil Arrival"; Transliteration: "Shuurai" (Japanese: 襲来) | September 10, 2011 |
A long time has passed since Mag Mel and Razenoid were destroyed and Earth, New Vestroia, Vestal, Gundalia, and Neathia were emptied of all the Chaos Bakugan. Everyone has returned home, including Spectra, Gus, Paige, Rafe, Taylean, Tristar, Boulderon, Wolfurio, Helios and Vulcan. As soon as everything turned back to normal, Mira arrived and brought her advanced Vestal technology to aid Marucho and the Marukura Corp into making the Bakugan Research Center, which is now the Bakugan Battle Brawlers Headquarters. Due the fact that the Interspace is gone because of Mag Mel's actions, the Marukura Corp and the Vestal scientists were able to create a new home for brawling in replacement of Bakugan Interspace known as Bakugan City. Once word got out about this place, a good amount of Bakugan from New Vestroia partnered up with humans and are now living there. That's not all, the Brawlers are still #1 with their new partners, like the rocking hardcore ninja tag team of Shun and Ventus Jaakor. Next is the awesome-persona and smack-talking but smart tag team of Marucho and Aquos Radizen. Finally we still got the ultimate brawlers, Dan and Pyrus Fusion Dragonoid. The first season of the Neo Bakugan City Tournament is about to end with the top 4 brawlers, Dan, Shun, Marucho, and Gunz Lazar battle it out. Julie Makimoto is also back as the new announcer for battles, including her rule (to avoid danger) of no Mechtogan during battles. Marucho, although making a top notch scientific plan to take down Gunz and his Haos Reptak, Marucho and Radizen lose. Next up is the long-awaited brawl between Dan and Shun, with Dan mimicking Shun and Jaakor's ninja style of brawling to win the match. After the battle, Shun questions how did Dan get those ninja skills. Dan replies saying from TV as Shun smiles. The final round is Dan VS Gunz in the finals, and who will win? Meanwhile in the now incredibly empty Doom Dimension, Fury is shown reprimanding and warning his Mechtogan Coredegon after being betrayed by him, who then kills him. Coredegon, along with Aquos Mandibor, Pyrus Slycerak, and Haos Exostriker are being rogue Mechtogan and want to make all Bakugan extinct. Betadron and 7 other Rogue Bakugan refuse to be betrayed by the ones they created but warn them not to go to Earth because of the threat that is the Battle Brawlers. Of course, the stubborn Mechtogan ignore this warning and head out anyway, with a Ventus Worton (also called Professor Worton) left afraid of the outcome. During the brawl between Dan and Gunz, Drago and Reptak are battling hand to hand combat until they Fusion Dragonoid's and Reptak's attack collides. Coredegon and the other Mechtogan arrived and Coredegon plans to destroy every Bakugan in the stadium, which causes massive chaos with Mira and Julie escorting everyone out. Dan, Gunz, Shun, and Marucho then battle the four Mechtogan off, but they are all defeated easily when all 4 of the Mechtogan combine to form the mighty Mechtavius Destroyer. Julie, Mira, and other spectators are seen cheering for Dan who then uses his powers with Drago to spawn Dragonoid Destroyer. Dragonoid Destroyer is known to be a Mechtogan Destroyer and he then speaks to Dan and Drago telling them to join him in his fight against the Mechtogan. The true Destroyer Showdown commences and the Mechtogan seem to be winning until Dragonoid Destroyer shows his true strength all blasts all four of them back to the Doom Dimension, with all of them cursing Dan and the others, After Coredegon escapes, Mira and Julie high-five, the audience cheers, but Marucho worries about whether or not these Mechtogan will return, a mysterious masked man named Wiseman is seen staring and laughing at the outcome of the battle.
| 171 | 28 | "Wiseman Cometh"; Transliteration: "Autoro" (Japanese: アウトロー) | September 17, 2011 |
The episode begins right after the battle between the Battle Brawlers and the Mechtogan. The Battle Brawlers start looking for Gunz but then run into Reptak, who is also looking for Gunz. After that, they go to the Bakugan Research Center in Bakugan City where Reptak explains his story to the Battle Brawlers. Jaakor wasn't sure if it is true, while Radizen and Roxtor stubbornly don't believe him, but then Mira says that it is a little unrealistic. Some time later, Mira shows Dan the data she was able to retrieve from his Bakumeter about the strange Mechtogan and Dragonoid Destroyer. The Brawlers then discover that Dragonoid Destroyer has two spaces on his shoulders to launch Bakugan during a battle. Meanwhile, in the Doom Dimension, the Nonet Bakugan wonder if Coredegon and the Mechtogan were victorious against the Bakugan, and they decide to ask Worton, but he tells them to be patient. Then a mysterious human calling himself Wiseman appears to them and offers them their freedom in exchange for their help in summoning the four Mechtogan that attacked Bakugan City earlier. Then they head down to Bakugan City and immediately start wreaking havoc on the construction site. Julie would report what was going on at the construction site and told Dan to get down there with the other brawlers. When the Brawlers appear to battle, they got hammered by the Nonet Bakugan and Mechtogan until they summoned Dragonoid Destroyer and were about to unleash a jumping attack with Jaakor and Radizen until Mira told them that since Radizen is not a Baku-Sky Raider, he cannot be used in a jumping attack and then found out that Reptak could be used because he is a Baku-Sky Raider. So, Dan and Drago summoned Dragonoid Destroyer and then attached Reptak and Jaakor to Dragonoid Destroyer and they launched the jumping attack. Then Mira creates an Aquos Blasterate for Radizen and he and Marucho join the battle and easily repel the Nonet Bakugan and the Mechtogan. Wiseman, defeated, leaves the scene. Dan tries to go after him, but he disappears. The Brawlers wonder who he was, but Reptak says that the way that he launches Bakugan was similar to his missing partner Gunz.
| 172 | 29 | "Mysterious Bond"; Transliteration: "Kizuna" (Japanese: 絆) | September 24, 2011 |
The episode starts with the brawlers discussing Wiseman and his Nonet Bakugan. In the middle of the discussion, Reptak leaves, as he was really worried by his missing partner, Gunz. Then, after reassuring Reptak that they would find him, Dan, Drago, and Reptak start to ask the people of Bakugan City if they had seen Gunz, but no one was seen him. However, Reptak hears the voice of Gunz and he saw him in a crowd of people. They followed him and go into the construction site. There, Wiseman was found, and challenges Dan in battle, throwing Betadron, Mutabrid, and Kodokor. Dan throws Drago and start the fight, but he loses in the first round. At the middle of the battle, Reptak questions if he was Gunz, but he challenges Dan to remove his mask on his own. Dan throws Reptak and fight with Drago, but they are still defeated. So Mira say to Dan to send battle suits to them and use Doomtronic and they defeat them easily. But Betadron along with his brothers unite and formed Gliderak. He defeated the Doomtronics Reptak and Drago use. Finally, they unite into Aeroblitz and defeat Gliderak. In the end, Reptak will go brawling with Dan and Drago until his missing partner was found.
| 173 | 30 | "The Prodigal Bakugan"; Transliteration: "Shinobi" (Japanese: シノビ) | October 1, 2011 |
At the beginning of the episode, it shows Shun and Jaakor training together on the element of surprise. After they are done, Shun leaves, while Jaakor stays to meditate. Soon after, Orbeum and Skytruss make a debut appearance and ask Jaakor to go with them back to New Vestoria so that they could protect the Bakugan who are heading back. Jaakor states that he needs time to mediate on this so they leave, Shun overhears the conversation and makes a decision to let Jaakor leave. Jaakor then has a talk with Shun and they decide to part ways so Jaakor could protect his family. Shun is soon confronted by Wiseman and his Bakugan Spatterix and Stronk. The two Bakugan fight Shun and Shun is able to hold his own for a while until they gain the upper hand. Jaakor is about to leave until he has a feeling that Shun is in trouble. Jaakor aids Shun in battle and was able to take on Spatterix and Stronk. The two Bakugan fuse together to create Scorptak and their combined power was able to take down Jaakor and his students. Jaakor then has Orbeum and Skytruss to fuse with him and they become Magmafury, with their combined power they defeat Scorptak forcing Wiseman to leave. Wiseman remarks that he is learning more about the brawlers each time he fights them. Orbeum and Skytruss then go to New Vestroia to help protect the Bakugan there.
| 174 | 31 | "Combination Impossible"; Transliteration: "Kenka joutou" (Japanese: 喧嘩上等) | October 8, 2011 |
After Shun tells his story about what happened in his battle with Wiseman, the other Bakugan pressure Radizen on who he is going to be able to combine with. Radizen has become upset because he is unable to have a combination like the others, until he is approached by Roxtor but he ignores him. He is later taken by Marucho who tries to cheer him up, to one of his family's hydroelectric plants. While on their way to the power plant, Mira hides in the back of Marucho's air carrier to help Marucho and Raidzen patch things up. After listening she talks to Roxtor stating that she didn't have to come at all. Marucho and Raidzen are confronted by Wiseman and they battle against his Bakugan, Radizen is able to hold his own and beat the two, but when they combine he has a hard time. Radizen then fuses with Roxtor and is able to defeat them in battle.
| 175 | 32 | "Enemy Allies"; Transliteration: "Tohjo" (Japanese: 登場) | October 15, 2011 |
The episode begins with Kato checking that all the Brawlers are asleep. Only Mira, who is working on some new Battle Suits for the Brawlers' Bakugan, is still awake. The next day, Julie and a camera man arrive at the HQ for an interview report. She then asks Dan, Marucho and Shun questions about Wiseman but their Bakugan pull her away. Mira then enters, saying she has finished the Battle Suits but before finishing explaining about their Battle Suits she faints but Dan catches her. She later wakes up in front of the Brawlers, Dan says to rest and she gets upset, Kato then asks her to call him if she needs anything but she then stops him and asks him a favour. The Brawlers are then sitting down when Kato then tells Marucho that he is going to get Mira something and leaves in Marucho's ship. Between this time Wiseman and Betadron talk about resummoning Coredegon and the others. They later appear in a park and Julie gets a call from her boss saying that Wiseman is back and she later hides in a bush whilst the Brawlers confront Wiseman. The Brawlers seem to be gaining the upper hand until the Nonet Bakugan generate enough energy to summon the Mechtogan to fight the Brawlers. They soon integrate into Mechtavius Destroyer and the Brawlers combine into Betakor and Magmafury but are defeated and Dan is knocked out. Kato is soon arriving with someone the Brawlers know well. Shun, Marucho, Reptak and Drago try and fail to wake up Dan but soon after a voice wakes him up Dan then realizes its Runo who Mira told Kato to go get because she knows Vestal Technology and sends the Battle Suits to the Brawlers. The Brawlers then gain the advantage and beat the Nonet Bakugan and Mechtavius Destroyer. After that, Runo is welcomed back to the team.
| 176 | 33 | "Battle for Bakugan Land"; Transliteration: "Ningen nante" (Japanese: 人間なんて) | October 22, 2011 |
The episode starts off with Dan showing Runo around the city, when they run into Julie who was looking for a scope. They all then decided to go to Bakugan Land, which is an amusement park in which the Bakugan dedicated to the humans as a thank you for being allowing them to live on Earth. Meanwhile Marucho and Shun were talking about Dan and Runo. Wiseman shows up to ruin the park with Spatterix and Stronk. Julie decides to get the inside scoop from the villain himself on why he is causing destruction, but he doesn't answer her and decides to battle Dan. Runo would leave to send Drago and Reptak their Battle Suits, Shun and Marucho would see the battle on TV and go to help Dan. Wiseman's Bakugan would fuse to become Scorptak and keeps Drago and Reptak from fusing, Runo finally sends the Battle Suits which turns the tide of the battle in Dan's favor which allows his Bakugan to defeat Scorptak. Thanks to both Dan and Julie the people began to trust the Bakugan again and Damdos (A Middle-Aged Damakor) regain his trust in humans.
| 177 | 34 | "Gunz Blazing"; Transliteration: "Waizuman" (Japanese: ワイズマン) | October 29, 2011 |
The Brawlers have given up hope of seeing Gunz again, but one stormy day he appears. However, Dan suspects that Gunz is really Wiseman until he receives news of Wiseman being in the city. After they arrive, the Brawlers found out that was a hologram, while the real Wiseman electrifies Runo and Kato to steal three Battle Suits. Dan pursues Gunz and discovers he is really Wiseman, and a brawl between Reptak and Tremblar begins. Near the end, Drago and Dragonoid Destroyer defeat Tremblar while Wiseman escapes with the stolen Battle Suits. Back at headquarters, the Brawlers discuss if Gunz was brainwashed which made Reptak decide to fight in order to save his partner.
| 178 | 35 | "Battle Suit Bash"; Transliteration: "Sakusen kaishi" (Japanese: 作戦開始) | November 5, 2011 |
After the Brawlers got used to the fact that Gunz was actually Wiseman, Mira was finally well enough to be discharged from the hospital but the bad news was Wiseman tricked them and stole some of the Battle Suits, however Defendtrix, Blasterate, and Doomtronic were the only ones left, now the pressure was on to get them back. Wiseman reappears with Betadron, Kodokor and Mutabrid with the stolen Battle Suits to battle Dan, Shun and Marucho. Meanwhile, Balista finds a secret door and ends up finding the real Gunz being unconscious and tangled in vines of some sort. Near the end, Dan and Wiseman have a personal fight to retrieve the stolen BakuMeter, but Wiseman and the Nonets retreat. Back to his volcano island, Wiseman reunites with Gunz and uses the vines to absorb his body's energy.
| 179 | 36 | "Countdown to Doomsday"; Transliteration: "Tatakai no hate ni" (Japanese: 戦いの果てに) | November 12, 2011 |
Wiseman finally decides to deploy the final stage of his plan, with the Nonet Bakugan more powerful after every battle, and with the stolen Battle Suits and the evil Mechtogan by their side, they are ready to face the Battle Brawlers. Meanwhile, the Battle Brawlers are analyzing the recollected data about the Nonet Bakugan, the evil Mechtogan, the stolen Battle Suits, and Wiseman himself, but they don't have enough information, so they decide to look for information from anyone they can ask. While they do this, Wiseman and the other Nonet Bakugan are getting ready for their battle against the Brawlers, but still they are not sure of trusting the evil Mechtogan. However, their leader, Betadron, doesn't really care of entrusting the evil Mechtogan, as long as he can destroy Drago, he will take any risk. After a long time searching, Skytruss and Orbeum locate Wiseman and alert the other Brawlers about him. When the two sides finally met, a great Bakugan battle engages using everything they got. Both sides are pushing themselves to the limit, but Wiseman and the Nonets summon the evil Mechtogan to help them destroy their enemy. The evil Mechtogan easily defeat the opposing Bakugan with a single blow, and when everything seems lost, they combine to form the deadly Mechtavius Destroyer. Seeing no choice, Dan decides to summon their ultimate battle machine, Dragonoid Destroyer, who quickly starts to battle against his "brother" with everything he has. Unfortunately, Dragonoid Destroyer isn't powerful enough to defeat Mechtavius Destroyer this time, so Mechtavius Destroyer focus all of his energy into a final blow and apparently defeats Dragonoid Destroyer, draining all his remaining energy. Before leaving, Mechtavius Destroyer makes a horrible proposal; the Brawlers must get rid of their partner Bakugan, if they do it before they return, only the Brawlers will be destroyed, but if they don't, the entire population of the Earth will be annihilated. After saying this, Mechtavius Destroyer vanishes alongside the Nonets and Wiseman, leaving the Brawlers in big trouble.
| 180 | 37 | "The Eve of Extermination"; Transliteration: "Taimu limitto" (Japanese: タイムリミット) | November 19, 2011 |
After the Brawlers were defeated, in their HQ, Dan asks Mira if Dragonoid Destroyer is okay, Mira reveals that Dragonoid Destroyer has 70% of his energy not on reserve and the other 30% is on reserve, But Dan questions why Dragonoid Destroyer is not using full power as it probably would have defeated Mechtavius Destroyer. It is also revealed that he will be unable to battle for 18 hours. Dan becomes frustrated, knowing that the Brawlers can't succeed without him, which leads to a fierce argument between Dan, Marucho, and Shun, the latter two arguing that they can win without Dragonoid Destroyer. Runo then breaks up the fight. Later that night, Runo, Mira, and Kato comfort Dan, Marucho, and Shun, bringing the trio back together in the process. They head to a stadium where Wiseman meets them. Dan tells him that they are going to fight for the Bakugan's freedom, starting another battle between Wiseman and the Brawlers. The battle between the Brawlers and Wiseman goes smoothly until Wiseman dismisses the Nonets again and summons the evil Mechtogan, where the Brawlers tell their Bakugan to combine, a fierce battle begins as Betadron tells the Nonets to chant evil thoughts about destroying Drago, this powers up the Mechtogan. The Mechtogan then form Mechtavius Destroyer, however the Brawlers are unable to defeat them even with the combinations. Shun and Marucho try to defend from a powerful attack from Mechtavius Destroyer and fail. The Brawlers are on the edge of defeat. Suddenly, Dragonoid Destroyer uses 20% of his energy reserves to summon two new Mechtogan for Jaakor and Radizen: Thorak and Flytris. Dan and the others then begin to use a powerful combined ability and manages to break through Mechtavius Destroyer's shield. Thorak and Flytris combine into Duomechtra and give the Brawlers the advantage they needed to win the match. Shun tries to capture Wiseman as he flees, but to no avail. Mira later tells the Brawlers that Thorak and Flytris came from 20% of Dragonoid Destroyer's reserve energy, leaving Dan wondering what he'll use for the other 10% as the episode ends.
| 181 | 38 | "Jump to Victory"; Transliteration: "Hishou" (Japanese: 飛翔) | November 26, 2011 |
Haos Aerogan continues his training in New Vestroia to jump high set by his mistress/master. However he yearns for more battling experience after continuously jumping higher since the beginning of training. Aerogan then sneaks off to Earth to find a potential battling partner so he can fight other Bakugan. Aerogan transports to Bakugan City but gets a less-than-welcome greeting from each of the Bakugan requesting for a battle. Aerogan is repeatedly buffeted and pinballed by angry Bakugan until he ends up making a soft landing into Runo's drink, who was relaxing in the park. Runo cleans Aerogan up and explains to him the current climate and how the Battle Brawlers are watching for any signs of Wiseman's movements. Aerogan is elated to hear that Runo is part of the Brawlers and is adamant to be her partner, despite Runo having given up brawling. However she does bring him back to the Brawlers' headquarters where the other Bakugan cites Aerogan's enthusiasm to join them but lacks the battling experience and its purpose. Dan leaves saying that Aerogan is now Runo's problem, much to her annoyance. Mira's analysis confirms Aerogan's high jumping prowess but Aerogan asks to train somewhere with Runo so she takes him to a place where Shun goes for his ninja training. Runo repeats her statement that she is not Aerogan's battling partner and that she and her former Guardian Bakugan, Tigrerra gave up battling on the front lines to protect their friends and family (possibly sometime after either the events Bakugan Battle Brawlers: New Vestroia or Bakugan: Gundalian Invaders). As Aerogan begins jumping, Wiseman is revealed to have eavesdropped on the conversation, surprised that Runo was once a Battle Brawler. He later crashes the party and challenges Runo to a brawl with Balista and Worton. Dan however shows up, finding Runo and Aerogan through Runo's tracking signal from Mira. Drago states they came to apologize to Runo before Dan had a chance to say anything else, though he recovers from this by accepting Wiseman's challenge. Drago and Reptak had trouble getting through the combined Nonets' cyclone attack that prevents Dan from activating their abilities but never gave up the fight, revealing to Aerogan their determination to not lose and the true meaning of brawling. When Dan calls upon Dragonoid Destroyer Runo sends Aerogan into battle, using Dragonoid Destroyer to send Aerogan up into the air and strikes the Nonets from above the vortex. While the Nonets quickly recovered the Brawlers used the same tactic again and again and defeated the Nonets, forcing Wiseman to retreat. Even though he found the true reason for battling, Aerogan decides to return to New Vestroia and thanks Runo for being an 'awesome' partner. Later, Aerogan apologizes to his master/mistress for leaving New Vestroia without her permission. Aerogan's trainer is revealed to be none other than Runo's former partner, Tigrerra, who forgives him by saying that no doubt he has learnt much from Runo and the Battle Brawlers. Tigrerra wishes for her and the other brawlers luck and stay safe no matter what.
| 182 | 39 | "Enemy Infiltration"; Transliteration: "Senyuu" (Japanese: 潜入) | December 3, 2011 |
The episode begins with Skytruss and Orbeum investigating on Wiseman's hideout, having been transported there by Shun when he threw them two episodes earlier. They then discover a secret room after wandering around for a while. Meanwhile, Wiseman reveals to the Nonets that the Mechtogan are now fully resurrected except for Coredegon; as Wiseman states he is saving him for last. As Skytruss and Orbeum send out a message to the Brawlers about Wiseman's hideout, Balista vows to find out Wiseman's true identity. Meanwhile, the Brawlers learn of Wiseman's hideout and they head there to take down Wiseman for good. Back at Wiseman's hideout, Skytruss and Orbeum face off against Stronk and Spatterix, but are eventually defeated and recovered by Dan, Marucho, and Shun. The Mechtogan except Coredegon appear and a huge battle ensues. Meanwhile, Balista tries to awaken Gunz from his prison, but is unsuccessful. Wiseman then appears and prepares to punish Balista for "putting his nose in other people's business". Balista demands Wiseman to reveal his true identity. Wiseman does so and presumably kills Balista in the process. Outside the cave, the Brawlers combine their Bakugan, in hopes of defeating the Mechtogan, but are overpowered and sent off a cliff. The episode then ends with Gunz finally awakening.
| 183 | 40 | "Gunz Lives"; Transliteration: "Ganzu" (Japanese: ガンズ) | December 10, 2011 |
Gunz has now finally woken up but he doesn't remember anything since his battle with Dan. Once he broke free from the vines, he went to find a way to escape from Wiseman's base. Wiseman and Worton were discussing if the Brawlers were still alive or not. After that, Worton asked Wiseman if he knew where Balista was, but he told him that he didn't know. Wiseman appeared before Gunz, revealed his face, and told Gunz how he was created from his jealousy of Dan. After that, he let Gunz look around to find Reptak. Meanwhile, Dan, Marucho, and Shun were in Kato's submarine after having fallen off a cliff. Reptak explained that Gunz was willing to fight Dan as a rookie, but when he lost, he got very angry, but Reptak encouraged him that no matter what, if they just train hard, they will win. Once his story was over, Mira announced that she made duplicates of the Battle Suits Wiseman stole. Once they were geared up and ready to fight, they headed off to the island. After Gunz took a drink of water on a fountain, he saw Reptak and called for him but they thought he is Wiseman, since Wiseman looks like Gunz. Gunz tries to clear up the misunderstanding, but the Brawler did not believe him while Reptak remains unsure as he asks Gunz a question. Wiseman then shows up out of nowhere, while Gunz was trying to explain, and teleported him to a part of his base. Shocked by this, the Brawlers were enraged at Wiseman for not only deceiving them but also pretending to be Gunz. Wiseman then threw Spatterix, Stronk, and Worton, including the Battle Suits that he stole. Later on, he sends out Betadron, Kodokor, Mutabrid, and Tremblar. After a long battle, Wiseman had enough energy, and arrogantly thanked both the Bakugan Battle Brawlers and the Nonet Bakugan for everything to get what he badly desires, and then he revealed his true identity, Coredegon. Coredegon then shot a wave that defeated all the Brawlers' Bakugan, and revealed that he was using both Battle Brawlers and the Nonets all this time, as well as pitting them against each other, in order to carrying his true plan, to conquer the world and the galaxy.
| 184 | 41 | "Evil Evolution"; Transliteration: "Zettai zetsumei" (Japanese: 絶体絶命) | December 17, 2011 |
After Wiseman revealed himself to be Coredegon, Coredegon is about to blast Drago into oblivion but the Nonets temporarily come to the Brawlers' aid. They are, however, quickly defeated by Coredegon. The battle gets more fierce as Gunz learns from Wiseman/Coredegon that he copied Gunz's appearance by absorbing his evil energy and reverting it. After that, the Nonets are told that he will give them two options, while transforming to his true Mechtogan form, they must choose to either return to the Doom Dimension or be buried alive. Meanwhile, in the battlefield, the Brawlers summon Flytris, Dragonoid Destroyer, and Thorak, as well as creating their combinations Aeroblitz, Magmafury, and Betakor, while the four rogue Mechtogan combine into the deadly Mechtavius Destroyer. The battle is fierce, but eventually, the Battle Brawlers and Dragonoid Destroyer lose. Mechtavius Destroyer reveals that he will not be satisfied if he destroys the Battle Brawlers now, so he chooses to extend their suffering by sending them to the Doom Dimension, though he intends to deal with them later. In the cave, Betadron saves Gunz, who agrees to be the Nonets' battling partner, except for Worton, who chooses to return to the Doom Dimension due to a good reason. Gunz then puts on Wiseman's helmet and a flaming red energy covers his entire body and turns him into a new Wiseman. His red suit, according to Betadron, changed its color to reveal all his inner fire. They arrive to confront Mechtavius Destroyer just as Gunz sees the Brawlers being sent to the Doom Dimension by Mechtavius Destroyer, letting their fate unknown.
| 185 | 42 | "Evil vs. Evil"; Transliteration: "Saraba...aibou" (Japanese: さらば...相棒) | December 31, 2011 |
The Brawlers are sent to the Doom Dimension. Gunz Lazar and the Nonets are angry with Mechtavius Destroyer for robbing them of their revenge against Drago which he did promise. Mechtavius Destroyer then tells the Nonets that he lied that he promised them revenge and that he will destroy them and absorb their powers for himself, and that the powers of the Nonet Bakugan will become a part of him. He then takes them all down with ease. Gunz then grabs the Nonets and runs off with them into the woods. Meanwhile, in the Doom Dimension, the Brawlers are clueless as to how to escape. Reptak then tells the Brawlers he is sure that Red Wiseman was the real Gunz. Dan later suggests that Drago try to teleport out of the Doom Dimension like before. Drago tries but fails due to the black magic that was mysteriously put in the Doom Dimension, leaving the Brawlers realizing that they are in serious trouble. Gunz and the Nonets are plotting to fight Mechtavius Destroyer and take him down for good. Stronk suggests that he and Spatterix combine but Spatterix does not want to as he does not like to combine with Stronk. They leave the woods and find Mechtavius Destroyer who fires at them. Gunz throws out Spatterix who tries to hold back the blast but is not powerful enough. Gunz then throws out Stronk who combines with Spatterix to form Scorptak and proceeds to attack Mechtavius Destroyer. Gunz then throws out Betadron, Kodokor, and Mutabrid who plan on combining as well but are shot down by Mechtavius Destroyer before they have the chance. The Darkus Nonets prepare to combine a second time but Mutabrid is shot point-blank by Mechtavius Destroyer and is weakened greatly. Despite this, he still insists on combining but he is once again shot by Mechtavius Destroyer. Mutabrid then apologizes to his two brothers and dies and is then his remains are absorbed by Mechtavius Destroyer. Gunz then throws out Tremblar. Enraged, the Nonets attack Mechtavius Destroyer all at once and momentarily destroys his shield. However, before they can attack again, the shield forms back. Tremblar, in combat mode, attacks Mechtavius Destroyer who shoots down and destroys the separated part of his body and then kills Tremblar, absorbing his remains as well. With the Nonets losing, Spatterix tells Gunz and Betadron to get out and go to the Doom Dimension so that they may face the Brawlers. Betadron, hesitant at first, agrees and takes Gunz with him. Kodokor then sacrifices himself so that Scorptak can take Mechtavius Destroyer down in the blast. However, his plan fails and Mechtavius Destroyer separates Spatterix and Stronk. On the verge of defeat, Spatterix tells Stronk that they need to combine again. Stronk tells Spatterix that he thought Spatterix did not like combining with him but Spatterix admits that he took back what he said before and that Stronk was the best partner he ever had. They are both then killed by Mechtavius Destroyer who absorbs their power and grows to a gigantic size. Back in the Doom Dimension, the Brawlers are still trapped when they hear Gunz's voice. They then see Gunz and Betadron, who tell them that they have come to finally have their vengeance.
| 186 | 43 | "Doom Dimension Throwdown"; Transliteration: "Saigo no shobu" (Japanese: 最後の勝負) | January 7, 2012 |
The episode starts on Julie's report on how people love Bakugan and Bakugan City and met the Subterra Damakor, Damdos, once again and he helped a girl get a balloon, showing his continuing kindness to humans. Meanwhile, the problem goes worse with the Brawlers in the Doom Dimension, not just on how to escape, but also Betadron and Gunz going into the Doom Dimension and challenging Dan Kuso and Drago in a battle. Betadron was still obsessed with taking down Drago and Gunz has revenge to Dan because of not only what he said to him, but also causing his partner, Reptak, end up battling with Dan. Dan tries to convince Gunz that Coredegon had deceived them like he deceived the Brawlers, but the later refuses to believe it due to his rage. After an intense battle, Dan and Drago emerge victorious, and Dan then apologizes to Gunz for his mistakes (him accusing Gunz for being the Original Wiseman, and for taking Reptak behind his back) Gunz forgives Dan and apologizes for his actions as well and decides to put his past and old life behind him and start anew with Reptak, discarding his identity as Wiseman 2.0. for good this time. Betadron also joins the Brawlers. Worton then appears and informs them that Mechtavius Destroyer must be stopped before it's too late. Just then, Mechtavius Destroyer goes into Bakugan City and destroys it, leaving nothing but a crater, and Worton senses it. Runo, Julie, Mira, and Kato are among those killed by Mechtavius Destroyer's blast.
| 187 | 44 | "Blast from the Past"; Transliteration: "Gekitou" (Japanese: 激闘) | January 7, 2012 |
After Mechtavius Destroyer destroyed Bakugan City with his full powers, killing Runo, Julie, Mira, and Kato as well, he destroys Earth as well, then he goes to New Vestroia to destroy it along with all the remaining Bakugan there, but his plan was interrupted by the Brawlers' bakugan from past seasons. They tried to defeat Mechtavius Destroyer, but they are defeated because of his strong power and are killed as well. Back in the Doom Dimension, Worton tells the Brawlers about the Current of Time, which he discovered by himself when he goes back into time and tells Balista not to reveal Wiseman the secrets about him in attempt to save his life. After, the Brawlers go into the Current of Time to get out of the Doom Dimension. As the current is about to get very strong, the Brawlers' memories were seen, including Betadron, who sees the fate of the Nonets when they were crushed by Mechtavius Destroyer. Also, the Brawlers have seen the destruction of Earth, Bakugan City and New Vestroia and see that Mechtavius Destroyer had also destroyed Vestal, Gundalia and Neathia, meaning that Fabia, Ren, Mason, Nurzak, Spectra, Gus, Ace, Baron, and all their other allies had probably fell victim to Mechtavius Destroyer's genocidal rampage of conquest as victims. After that, Worton and Betadron sacrificed themselves so that the Brawlers make it to face Mechtavius Destroyer for the final battle. Successfully getting out of the Doom Dimension, arriving before Mechtavius Destroyer could depart to destroy Bakugan City, the Brawlers told Mechtavius Destroyer that he will be defeated this time, and the final battle begins!
| 188 | 45 | "Beginning of the End"; Transliteration: "Kessen" (Japanese: 決戦) | January 7, 2012 |
With help from Worton and Betadron, the Brawlers travel back in time to stop Mechtavius Destroyer from destroying Bakugan City, Earth, New Vestroia, and more, saving the lives of Runo, Julie, Mira, Kato, and their old guardian Bakugan in the process. Mira and Julie decide to go help them out, but Runo stays behind to send the Battle Suits to the Brawlers. The Brawlers use Bakugan Combinations to counter Mechtavius Destroyer, but are easily defeated. Shun and Marucho summon Flytris and Thorak for help, while Dan summons Dragonoid Destroyer. However, Dragonoid Destroyer only fights at 90% of his energy, stating that "Not everyone is here yet". Mechtavius Destroyer then uses his powers to destroy Volcano Island, the location that had once been the hideout for the now-disbanded Nonets. Gunz considers giving Reptak to Dan due to his lack of knowledge of Bakugan Combinations, Battle Suits, Mechtogan, and Mechtogan Destroyers, but Reptak firmly states that they are partners 'til the end. Mechtavius Destroyer then fires a strong blast at Gunz and Reptak, but at that same moment, Reptak spawns a Mechtogan: Chromopod. Dragonoid Destroyer then announces that everyone is here.
| 189 | 46 | "End of the Line"; Transliteration: "Rasuto Batoru" (Japanese: ラスト・バトル) | January 26, 2012 |
Gunz and Reptak have created a new Mechtogan, Chromopod. Upon his arrival, Dragonoid Destroyer begins to use 100% of his power. He soon goes through a "metamorphosis" that turns him golden and enormous. It is revealed that his infinite power comes from the bond between Bakugan and humans all over the world. With a single blast, Dragonoid Destroyer finally destroys Mechtavius Destroyer for good, preventing the dark future that the Brawlers had seen while in the Current of Time, with Mechtavius Destroyer screaming in anguish as he is obliterated, never to threaten a Bakugan or human or living soul ever again. Dan and Drago then meet the original Dragonoid, Genesis Dragonoid, who congratulates them on their victory. He had been using Dragonoid Destroyer as a vessel to speak to them. He tells them that he is proud of Dan, Drago, and the other humans for getting along so well with the Bakugan and being able to spawn Mechtogan. He explains a little more about Fury and the Nonets whom he banished to the Doom Dimension, and how he had never suspected that Nonets' hate would grow so strong that they would be able to escape until now. Genesis departs, stating that whatever the future has in store for Dan and Drago, the two will overcome any challenge together. With the battle over and the world saved again, the Brawlers return to Bakugan City, as the Tournament still has one match left undecided. Just like before, Gunz and Reptak fight their hardest against Dan and Drago, but in the end, Dan and Drago win and remain as the champions. After, Dan's friends throw a party to celebrate his victory, but soon question his absence. Shun notices Dan and Drago sailing off in a boat borrowed from Kato. Dan says that another adventure awaits him and Drago, they've had enough time in the spotlight, that the time has come for other Brawlers to rise to his rank. Taking a break from it all, Dan and Drago depart, ready to see where the world takes them.
