= Bakugan: Gundalian Invaders =

- Season 3
- Poster for third season of Bakugan: Gundalian Invaders series
- No. of episodes: 39

Release
- Original network: TV Tokyo; Teletoon; Cartoon Network
- Original release: May 23, 2010 – January 29, 2011

Season chronology
- ← Previous; Battle Brawlers: New Vestroia Next → Mechtanium Surge

Bakugan: Gundalian Invaders, known in Japan Bakugan Battle Brawlers: Gundalian Invaders (爆丸バトルブローラーズ ガンダリアンインベーダーズ, Bakugan Batoru Burōrāzu: Gandarian Inbēdāzu), is the third season of Japanese anime television series Bakugan Battle Brawlers. It has 39 episodes in length total, and is produced by TMS Entertainment and Maxpire Entertainment, which replaced Japan Vistec, which is in charge in animation in the last two seasons. The season premiered in Canada on May 23, 2010, and in the United States on May 29, 2010. This season ended on January 29, 2011, and is followed by a fourth season. In Japan it premieres on April 3, 2011, taking over the time slot of LilPri at 9:00 AM.

== Episode list ==
No. overall	No. in season	Title	Japanese air date	English air date
105	1	"A New Beginning" ("New World"); Transliteration: "Shinsekai" (Japanese: 新世界)	April 3, 2011	May 23, 2010 (Canada); May 29, 2010 (USA)
It's an all new adventure for the Bakugan Battle Brawlers when Dan's family moves to Bayview City and Marucho's Bakugan Interspace becomes fully operational to everyone, allowing kids all over the world to log on and display their battling skills. Dan heads to a cafe in town where Julie works to meet with his new friend Jake, a young brawler who is new to the game. The two make their way to Bakugan Interspace where they meet up with Marucho who gives Jake Subterra Coredem. They eventually meet up with Ren and Shun, who is locked in battle with Shuji. With Shun quickly seizing victory, Ren is scheduled to battle Dan next. As the battle intensifies, Marucho is forced to shut down Bakugan Interspace and Dan is knocked out cold. Before coming to, Dan has a vision of Bakugan at war with each other, something which everyone, except Ren, brushes off as a hallucination.
106	2	"Revelation" ("Battlefield"); Transliteration: "Senjō" (Japanese: 戦場)	April 10, 2011	May 30, 2010 (Canada); June 5, 2010 (USA)
On the distant planet Gundalia, the Twelve Orders discuss the explosion caused by Ren and Dan's battle in Bakugan Interspace. Unable to identify Drago, Barodius orders that this bakugan be brought to them before it joins their enemy. Back on Earth, Jake and Julie believe that what Dan saw was a dream, though he is still convinced that it was real. Just then, Marucho calls and everyone heads to Bakugan Interspace, where Ren confesses that he is a humanoid alien being from Gundalia looking for strong battlers to help fend off the invading Neathians. Though hesitant, the Brawlers accept and track down two moles identified by Ren, Sid Arcale and Lena Isis and a battle ensues. Though Sid and Lena gain the upper hand, Dan pulls through with JetKor and wins the battle. However, there may be more to Ren than meets the eye. This episode was the debut of Sid's Guardian Bakugan Rubanoid, the only non-mechanical Bakugan creature that is illustrated with computer graphics.
107	3	"The Visitor" ("Encounter"); Transliteration: "Deai" (Japanese: 出会い)	April 17, 2011	June 6, 2010 (Canada); June 12, 2010 (USA)
As Ren identifies three more Neathian moles (Mason Brown, Jesse Glenn, and Zenet Surrow), Princess Fabia from Neathia arrives in Bakugan Interspace looking for the recipients of the message she sent. Dan, having slept in, rushes to Bakugan Interspace and runs into Fabia, literally. Dan tells them about the girl and Ren suspects she may be a Neathian spy. Before they can track her, Fabia arrives and is shocked to find that Ren, a Gundalian, has gained their trust first! Now that Dan has sided with the Gundalians, Fabia claims they are her enemy and a battle ensues between her and Dan. Dan quickly takes the lead but falters when Fabia summons Haos Aranaut, the original Aranaut from which the clone Aranaut, Coredom, Hawktor and Akwimos originated, meaning Fabia sent the Phantom Data. Defeated, Fabia leaves and wonders what to do now that Dan has sided with the Gundalians. While the others congratulate Dan on his victory, Shun disappears to ask Fabia what her side of the story is.
108	4	"Brawler To Be" ("Touchdown"); Transliteration: "Tacchidaun" (Japanese: タッチダウン)	April 24, 2011	June 13, 2010 (Canada); June 19, 2010 (USA)
Dan gives Jake a practice match, but Jake feels he is not ready to become an official Bakugan Battle Brawler. When another mole, Mason Brown, is located, Dan challenges him to a battle, but Jake steps in and wants to prove himself. Due to his inexperience, Jake quickly loses and feels he has failed Dan in proving himself. The next day, Jake is still upset over his loss, so Julie, being a Subterra master, offers to help him discover his own battling style. Jake returns for a rematch with Mason while being greeted by a bitter crowd. With his newfound confidence, Jake easily defeats Mason. Before the Brawlers can pursue Mason, he teleports out of the stadium. Dan congratulates Jake, who becomes an official Battle Brawler.
109	5	"Confrontation" ("Mission"); Transliteration: "Misshon" (Japanese: ミッション)	May 1, 2011	June 20, 2010 (Canada); June 26, 2010 (USA)
With the Neathian moles making themselves known, they begin kidnapping brawlers from Bakugan Interspace. The puzzling part is that each brawler is eventually returned to BI. Meanwhile, Sid and Zenet find their recruiting hard when Marucho puts out an announcement to everyone not to battle Sid, Lena, Mason, Jesse and Zenet. In retaliation, Sid and Zenet challenge Dan and Ren to a battle. Ren is quickly taken out, leaving Dan to fend for himself. Being outnumbered, Dan loses but Sid allows him to keep Drago. After the battle, Gill of the Twelve Orders orders Sid to not engage the brawlers and to leave it to Ren, who states their plan is working perfectly.
110	6	"Exposed" ("Suspicion"); Transliteration: "Giwaku" (Japanese: 疑惑)	May 8, 2011	June 27, 2010 (Canada); July 3, 2010 (USA)
Fabia tells Shun her side of the story, which he believes while he worries that the others have made a big mistake. While Marucho and Ren work hard on an expansion for Bakugan Interspace, Jesse Glenn arrives. Dan heads to the new arena to challenge him but is stopped by Fabia, who claims that Jesse is not who he claims to be, and battles him instead. Ren insists that they do not cheer for either of them and they should just let their enemies destroy each other. Despite this, Dan, Jake and Marucho cheer for Fabia. Although she puts up a good fight, Fabia loses due to a bug in the field, causing her to cry over her loss. Shun explains that the only person who could plant an unlikely bug that caused Fabia's defeat was someone familiar with the BI System, someone like Ren. Ren denies everything while Jesse flees. Fabia and Shun expose Ren for lying about how Neathia attacked Gundalia, causing him to run away. Marucho, however, refuses to believe these accusations and rushed off to find Ren.
111	7	"True Colours" ("Truth"); Transliteration: "Shinjitsu" (Japanese: 真実)	May 15, 2011	July 4, 2010 (Canada); July 10, 2010 (USA)
Marucho frantically searches Bakugan Interspace and his home for Ren, but comes up with nothing. Meanwhile, Ren meets up with Sid, Lena, Mason, Jesse and Zenet, scolding Jesse for giving away his cover. Marucho uses a secret message to get Ren to meet him and they battle. Meanwhile, Fabia tells everyone her side of the story: Neathia was attacked by Gundalia and, due to their bakugan's inexperience in battle, they quickly lost to the Gundalian Bakugan. Fabia then sent out a distress message via the Phantom Data which leads her to BI on Earth. Shun discovers the battle going on between Marucho and Ren and when they arrive, Marucho defeats Ren. Ren attempts to get Marucho to switch sides, but he refuses to leave his friends. Ren declares their friendship over and reveals his true Gundalian form and tells Marucho that the next time they meet, they will be enemies.
112	8	"Hostile Takeover" ("Comrades"); Transliteration: "Nakama-tachi" (Japanese: 仲間たち)	May 22, 2011	July 11, 2010 (Canada); July 17, 2010 (USA)
After the battle with Ren, Marucho is refreshed and even constructs a speech program for the clone Akwimos. Fabia worries that Dan and the others do not fully trust her as they were easily tricked by Ren, but Dan assures her that they completely trust her after seeing how angry she got about Bakugan being used for war. Relieved, Fabia gives Shun, Marucho and Jake the real Hawktor, Akwimos and Coredem. Meanwhile, Ren leads the other Gundalians to kidnap two brawlers named Taylor and Casey. The two are taken back to Gundalia where they are brainwashed into fighting against the Neathians. Dan and the others confront Ren who sends Taylor and Casey to attack them. Dan and Shun battle Mason and Taylor while Marucho and Jake battle Sid and Casey. Fabia, however, sneaks off in hopes for finding Ren to discover his plans. After winning their respective battles and freeing Taylor and Casey from the Gundalians' control, they are all forced out of BI. Ren reveals that he is now in sole control of BI.
113	9	"Twin Attack" ("Capture"); Transliteration: "Dasshu" (Japanese: 奪取)	May 29, 2011	July 18, 2010 (Canada); July 24, 2010 (USA)
Dan and the others have been forced out of Bakugan Interspace and Ren has taken control! However it seems that they were the only ones kicked out as other kids continue to log on, not knowing what is going on. Dan tries to enter Bakugan Interspace, but is rejected. Marucho is unable to shut it down as Ren has complete control, so Jake tries brute force, which actually works. Jake, using Coredem's body teleportation powers, takes Dan with him into BI. They witness brainwashed kids lure more kids back to Gundalia. The same two brawlers who accused Dan of lying reappear, now brainwashed by Gundalia, and battle Dan and Jake. They easily secure victory as well as the opponent Bakugan. The two boys are released from Gundalian control and Dan and Jake take them out of Bakugan Interspace. Dan vows to rescue all the brainwashed children.
114	10	"Escape From Darkness" ("The Dark Door"); Transliteration: "Yami no tobira" (Japanese: 闇の扉)	June 5, 2011	July 25, 2010 (Canada); July 31, 2010 (USA)
With Ren still under control of Bakugan Interspace, Marucho quickly comes up with a plan to regain his beloved creation. Emperor Barodius calls Ren and suspects Ren may betray them due to his desire to not battle with his former friends, but Ren assures him he is loyal while Linehalt is unconvinced. Ren reminds him of the story behind their loyalty to Barodius: there were many ancient Bakugan with Forbidden powers but they were sealed underground. Eventually their numbers dwindled to just Linehalt. Ren was the last descendant of the Protectors of the Dark Bakugan and was assigned to take care of Linehalt. Over the years, they bonded and dreamed of escaping their underground prison until Barodius recruited them to lead the invasion team to Earth. Meanwhile, Marucho and Fabia infiltrate Bakugan Interspace. Marucho tries to regain control while Fabia and an Avatar Marucho battle Lena and Zenet. The Avatar is quickly taken out as Ren discovers Marucho's invasion. Fabia is defeated and Zenet and Lena decided to take her back as a prisoner, something that will give them an edge against Neathia. However, Marucho arrives in time to get her out. Though their mission was unsuccessful, Marucho reveals he installed a back door to better access Bakugan Interspace without alerting Ren and his team.
115	11	"The Secret Package" ("Messenger"); Transliteration: "Messenjā" (Japanese: メッセンジャー)	June 12, 2011	August 1, 2010 (Canada); August 7, 2010 (USA)
The Gundalians are easily overpowering the Neathians thanks to the brainwashed brawlers Ren got from Bakugan Interspace. In a last desperate attempt, the Captain of the Neathian Guard sends a Castle Knight, Linus to Earth to give Fabia the Element, the very thing the Gundalians are trying to take from the Neathians. As security tightens for the brawlers, their attempt to bring kids out safely is getting more difficult. After Shun returns from saving more kids, he runs into Linus who is looking for Fabia. Though reluctant to trust him at first, they are attacked by Ren and Jesse and a battle ensues. Linus' partner Neo displays incredible power but the battle eventually goes to Jesse, who takes Neo as his victory prize. Linus is taken back to the others after being injured during the battle. He tells Fabia that having lost Neo to the Gundalians, he has also lost the Element, leaving Neathia doomed.
116	12	"The Element" ("Fate of the Flames"); Transliteration: "Honō no sadame" (Japanese: 炎のさだめ)	June 26, 2011	August 8, 2010 (Canada); August 14, 2010 (USA)
Dan and the others devise a plan to regain Neo while Linus desperately struggles to rescue his friend. Far too injured from the previous episode, Linus is urged to rest and leave rescuing Neo to Dan. With the Gundalian's search for the Element comes up with nothing, Ren is given orders to bring Neo to Gundalia on suspicion that he holds the Element. Before Ren can carry out these orders, Sid barges in and takes Neo, deciding to get a little glory himself and challenges Dan. When Sid finally throws in Neo, Neo gives Drago the Element, causing him to evolve into Lumino Dragonoid. However, Neo's body disappears in the process. With Drago evolving once again, Dan easily takes a win. Meanwhile, Neo appears to Linus in his dream to bid his friend a final farewell, his mission now complete. Ren and Sid are berated for having lost the Element so soon after getting it. Sid's Rubanoid is taken by Kazarina for experiments while Sid is disposed of. Ren is given one final chance to prove himself to Barodius.
117	13	"Twin Evil" ("Transformation"); Transliteration: "Henshin" (Japanese: 変身)	July 3, 2011	August 15, 2010 (Canada); August 21, 2010 (USA)
With Drago receiving the Element from the now departed Neo, the Brawlers decide to head back to Neathia to help fight off the Gundalians. Before they can do so, Dan must say goodbye to Julie. Meanwhile, Ren sends Zenet to steal the Element back via trickery. So, she disguises herself as Julie and tries to take Drago. However, her plan is foiled when the real Julie shows up, throwing Dan and Drago into confusion! However, when he reveals he is leaving for Neathia to help fight, the real Julie expresses that she is ok with it and hopes they succeed, assuring Dan that she is the real Julie. Zenet is forced to reveal herself and battles Drago. She tries to trick Drago by transforming Contestir's appearance, but Drago overpowers her with his new Battle Gear Cross Buster. Zenet retreats and informs Ren that the Brawlers are heading to Neathia. Ren runs to them before they go, but arrives just as they leave with Julie cheering them on, commenting that they will meet soon again.
118	14	"The Sacred Orb" ("Front Line"); Transliteration: "Saizensen" (Japanese: 最前線)	July 10, 2011	August 22, 2010 (Canada); August 28, 2010 (USA)
As the Brawlers arrive on Neathia, Fabia introduces them to her older sister, Queen Serena. She then takes the brawlers to see the Sacred Orb, the true target of Barodious' conquest, from which the Element fragmented from. Meanwhile, Barodious scolds Ren, Lena, Zenet, Mason and Jesse for seriously failing their initial plan to gain the Brawlers' trust and violently commands the Twelve Orders to attack Neathia. The Brawlers do their best to hold the Gundalians off while Dan and Drago fight Barodius and Dharak Colossus but they succeed in breaking through Neathia's second shield. While the fighting is going on, Captain Elright, who was captured in episode 11, escapes from one of Gundalian's Stabber Knights and joins the battle. Just before Drago and Dharak can engage in further combat, the Sacred Orb suddenly teleports all the Gundalians away. The Neathians celebrate their victory as Fabia, Dan, Jake, Marucho, and Shun are made Castle Knights, the highest honor on the planet Neathia.
119	15	"Decoy Unit" ("Lightning Speed"); Transliteration: "Denkōsekka" (Japanese: 電光石火)	July 17, 2011	August 29, 2010 (Canada); September 4, 2010 (USA)
With only one shield left defending Neathia, it looks like Gundalia may actually win this war. However, Marucho devises a plan to distract the oncoming Gundalian attack consisting of Airzel, Kazarina and Stoica, while a small unit consisting of Shun, Dan, Fabia and their bakugan head to the second shield generator to restart it. Marucho and Jake act as the decoys while Fabia leads Dan and Shun to the generator. When the battle gets too intense, Marucho and Akwimos trap Strikeflier and Avior in ice and escape, while Fabia, Dan and Shun get closer to the generator.
120	16	"The Secret Switch" ("Counterattack"); Transliteration: "Hangeki" (Japanese: 反撃)	July 24, 2011	September 5, 2010 (Canada); September 11, 2010 (USA)
Dan, Fabia and Shun continue their way through the forest to the second shield generator while fighting off an onslaught of carnivorous plants. Soon enough, they run into Stoica and Jesse. Shun continues ahead while Dan and Fabia remain behind to deal with the Gundalians. A battle quickly ensues between Fabia and Jesse, both her and Aranaut eager for revenge on Jesse and Plitheon. After Fabia secures a win, Stoica steps in who quickly deduces that Fabia and Dan are distracting them, due to Dan not participating in the battle. However, it looks like battling two Gundalians takes its toll as Aranaut begins to struggle. Dan finally steps in, revealing that he is in possession of Shun's Hawktor and not Drago. Stoica and Jesse retreat in loss as Shun and Drago arrives just outside the shield generator.
121	17	"Battle For the Second Shield" ("Revival"); Transliteration: "Fukkatsu" (Japanese: 復活)	July 31, 2011	September 12, 2010 (Canada); September 25, 2010 (USA)
Shun successfully sneaks past the Gundalian guards into the second shield generator, but is ambushed by Lena and Kazarina. A battle quickly ensues and Lena is taken out. When Kazarina and Lumagrowl begin giving Shun too much trouble, Dan and Hawktor suddenly arrive to save the day! Dan and Shun switch back their bakugan and Shun heads to the generator while Dan holds off Kazarina. Shun reactivates the shield as Drago powers it up with the Element. Realizing what is happening, Airzel, Stoica and Kazarina quickly flee before being trapped within the shield. As the brawlers celebrate their victory, all is not well on Gundalia. Kazarina knows she will be punished by Baridous for the failure, so she plans to use Lena as her scapegoat. Lena, however, is fully aware of this thanks to Gill, and attempts to get Phosphos to assassinate Kazarina before it can happen. Unfortunately for her, Kazarina is well prepared as Phosphos is taken out by Lumagrowl while Kazarina disposes of Lena. Kazarina successfully evades punishment and hints to Gill that she knew of his assistance to Lena, while Ren overhears and mourns over Lena's fate.
122	18	"Curtain Call" ("Dream Theater"); Transliteration: "Yume shibai" (Japanese: 夢芝居)	August 7, 2011	September 19, 2010 (Canada); November 30, 2010 (USA)
While the brawlers help the Neathians rebuild, Jake has an argument with Dan, saying that they should keep pressing the attack on the Gundalians now that they have the advantage. When Dan and Marucho argue that they should help rebuild, Jake runs off into the forest, followed by Fabia. Meanwhile, Jesse fears that he will eventually suffer the same fate as Sid and Lena and escapes from his prison to Neathia. He is eventually approached by Ren, who has been sent to collect him. They eventually run into Jake and Fabia and a battle ensues. Jake and Fabia defeat the Gundalians and Jesse willingly returns to Gundalia with Ren, having had one final battle. Kazarina and Stoica prepare to punish Jesse for his escape and lose to the brawlers while Ren attempts to spare Jesse by saying he was much a part of the battle as Jesse was. Plitheon suddenly speaks out and begs to be separated from Jesse, something that surprises Jesse. However, Lumagrowl and Lytherius attack Plitheon for turning on his master. Jesse forgives Plitheon, saying that co-stars often have friction between them, but Plitheon insists he means what he said as he slowly fades away and Jesse is disposed of. While Kazarina and Stoica are walking through the hall, Nurzak appears and tells them that although they can trick the others of their true intentions, he can see them for what they really are.
123	19	"The Secret of the Orb" ("Secret Maneuvers"); Transliteration: "Anyaku" (Japanese: 暗躍)	August 14, 2011	September 26, 2010 (Canada); December 1, 2010 (USA)
With the second shield functioning at an even more powerful rate than before, things are looking good for Neathia. Meanwhile, Nurzak and Kazarina are sent to do recon. Nurzak tells Sabator how Barodius' father, the previous Emperor, did not seek to attain the Sacred Orb, fearing that its power is too great, while Barodius is far too ambitious and down right stupid for engaging in such a quest. Mason, however, has plans of his own and escapes the ship. Kazarina becomes infuriated because of what may happen to her, but Nurzak assures her that he and Ren will find Mason. While on their search, they run into Fabia and Marucho, who still feels bitter about Ren's betrayal. The battle becomes so intense that the Sacred Orb shoots out dimensional rays, that should one get caught in, they will be sent around the dimensions without any way back. Nurzak and Ren retreat while Aranaut and Akwimos attempt to shield Fabia and Marucho from the dimensional rays. Just before it hits them, the Sacred Orb stops but not before Mason and Avior fall victim to it. Meanwhile, Marucho believes that Ren will return to their side. However, things don't look to good for Kazarina as she finally gets the punishment she deserves from Barodius, though she is kept alive. While in the hallway, she encounters Nurzak who tells her that he is leaving the Emperor and with Gill as the Emperor's right hand, she needs to find a place for herself quickly. He encourages her to join him, to which she agrees.
124	20	"Partners 'Til the End" ("Dream"); Transliteration: "Yume" (Japanese: 夢)	August 21, 2011	October 2, 2010
The brawlers decide to use the Sacred Orb to their advantage by convincing Gundalians who fear its power to switch sides, namely Nurzak. Ren has a meeting with Barodius where the Emperor reveals that despite the failures of Ren's team, he keeps Ren around because of his potential. Suddenly, Zenet comes in and begs Ren to help her, fearing that she will suffer the same fate as the others. Ren brushes her off and tells her she has nothing to worry about. Contestir tries to cheer her up by agreeing with Ren, but Zenet tells him that Gundalians care nothing of loyalty and despite her morphing abilities she has no use to them. Then she overhears that Gill and Ren are leaving to Neathia to destroy the second shield again. She disguises herself as Ren to take his place in order to prove herself, but Krakix easily sees through the guise and Gill decides to give her a chance anyway. While Gill and Krakix gather data on the second shield to completely destroy it, Zenet must keep Shun and Hawktor off him. However, Shun proves to be too much for her to handle, so Gill steps in and nearly defeats Shun, that is until Dan and Drago arrive. Gill and Zenet are defeated and return to Gundalia, where Zenet greatly fears her punishment. However, Contestir convinces Gill that because he is Barodius' right hand man, he will likely have people plotting against him, and that he may have use for a spy and volunteers Zenet. Gill sees this as a good idea and sends her to spy on Kazarina as Nurzak. She pulls it off and returns with information that Kazarina and Nurzak and plotting to overthrow the Emperor. Despite a job well done, Gill and Krakix dispose of Zenet and Contestir. Zenet once again explains Contestir that Gundalians care nothing for loyalty. Contestir argues that he has always been loyal to Zenet, who begins crying and apologizes for not seeing it earlier.
125	21	"Divide and Conquer" ("Rebellion"); Transliteration: "Hangyaku" (Japanese: 反逆)	August 28, 2011	October 2, 2010
Nurzak sends a message to the brawlers for a meeting to discuss a peace treaty. The brawlers are unsure but decide to take the risk anyway. Nurzak plans to use Kazarina's attack on the emperor as his chance to sneak away to Neathia and give the brawlers the Switch Code, something that can supposedly control the Sacred Orb. Meanwhile, Gill informs Barodius of Nurzak and Kazarina's betrayal and heads to stop him before he leaves for Neathia. Kazarina arrives with her troops and reveals that she is actually working for Barodius as a triple agent! However, Barodius decides to deal with Nurzak via battle. When Sabator begins absorbing Dharak's power, it proves to be too much for him to handle. Barodius destroys Nurzak and Sabotaur and the entire building as well. The brawlers, still waiting for Nurzak, conclude that they have either been stood up or something has happened to Nurzak. Back on Gundalia, Barodius thanks Kazarina for her services while Gill vows to take Kazarina down, still not trusting her.
126	22	"Mobile Assault" ("Take Off"); Transliteration: "Teiku Ofu" (Japanese: テイク・オフ)	September 4, 2011	October 2, 2010
With one of the 12 Orders disposed of, Barodius secures the loyalty of the others or else they will face the same fate as Nurzak. The Gundalians launch a small attack consisting of the brainwashed kids. Unfortunately for the brawlers, when most of the kids are beaten, the Gundalian brainwashing does not wear off. While Kazarina experiments on more bakugan, she sends Ren to collect more battlers from Bakugan Interspace while Gill sends Stoica with him. Stoica however, bails to do things his way leaving Ren on his own. Meanwhile, the subterra brawler Fabia defeated in episode 3, Koji, attempts to get in to have a battle, but is stopped by Julie, who tells him about the Gundalian-Neathian war while Stoica watches from afar. Koji leaves, believing Julie's story is too farfetched, and Stoica convinces him to head to Gundalia where he and other kids are brainwashed by Kazarina. With more kids attacking, Dan and Fabia split off from the others and encounter a Bakugan Mobile Assault Vehicle, a highly evolved Battle Gear, named Implanton. Fabia immediately recognizes Koji but is unable to get him to remember her. Fabia decides to use an Assault Vehicle designed for Drago and has it uploaded to his Bakumeter, and while it is downloading, she holds off Koji. The upload is complete and Dan easily defeats Koji with Drago's Assault Vehicle, but Koji is still under their influence. Dan vows to free all the kids from Gundalian control. Kazarina releases control and the kids are returned to Bakugan Interspace. Koji tells Julie about what happened and how he doesn't remember anything after meeting Stoica but he vaguely remembers Dan's voice.
127	23	"Sid Returns" ("Escape"); Transliteration: "Dasshutsu" (Japanese: 脱出)	September 11, 2011	October 2, 2010
Deep within Gundalia, Sid wakes up from statis and learns that he, Lena, Jesse and Zenet were not actually killed, but imprisoned. Sid has managed to escape and notices Ren leaving with some troops. On Neathia, the brawlers stand watch, waiting for the Gundalian forces, which arrives at sunrise. Armed with a Bakugan Mobile Assault Vehicle, Drago quickly tears through the Gundalian forces. Drago is suddenly ambushed by Ren and Linehalt but the two are too evenly matched. Dan begins asking why Ren fights for Barodius to which Ren reveals Barodius gave him freedom. Dan mentions that the emperor put him in darkness and that Ren must have been happy being friends with Marucho, even though if it was a ruse. Ren shouts at Dan saying that he is Gundalian and he knows nothing, but Dan replies that he is also a Brawler. Dan tries to get Ren to join them, but Ren refuses to forget those who have fallen at his hands (Sid, Lena, Jesse and Zenet). The fight continues but Rubanoid suddenly enters, being commanded by Sid. The two press hard on Dan and Drago but Dan reveals another new Assault Vehicle, one which he can control and Dan easily wins the battle. Sid tells Ren that the others are still alive and Dharak attacks them. Sid knocks Ren out of the way and falls over a cliff, but not before giving Rubanoid to Ren to take care of and telling him to not worry about the others and to "do what he has to do." Dan begs Ren not to go, but he leaves without a word.
128	24	"Colossus Dharak" ("Leaving for the Front"); Transliteration: "Shutsujin" (Japanese: 出陣)	September 18, 2011	October 2, 2010
After his battle with Dan and Sid giving him Rubanoid, Ren is very confused as to what he should do. The invasion continues on as the brawlers continue to push back the Gundalians. Kazarina finishes her experiments on Dharak's Exokor while Ren has a talk with Barodius. Kazarina informs the emperor of Exokor's completion and the 12 Orders clear a path to the second shield for him. Meanwhile, Drago and Dan hammer on Colossus Dharak, but he proves to be far too powerful. Once again, Dan reaches out to Ren to get him to switch sides before continuing battling Barodius. Drago quickly falls to Dharak's immense power and the second shield is punctured. Barodius orders Ren to prove his loyalty by finishing off Dan and Drago. Linehalt asks if Ren is sure to which he replies he has no other choice. Dan tells Ren just to get it over with when Ren suddenly fires at Dharak and declares he is doing something he should have done a long time ago: fighting alongside his real friends.
129	25	"Dragonoid Colossus" ("The End of the Forbidden"); Transliteration: "Kindan no hate" (Japanese: 禁断の果て)	September 25, 2011	October 9, 2010
Ren decides he has had enough of Barodius' false promises and turns on him to fight by his true friends. Dharak however, chooses to let Exokor, Riptor, and Smashtor do the fighting, but eventually joins in a one on one battle against Linehalt. Meanwhile, one by one, the brawlers are taken out by the Twelve Orders. Ren takes a bad beating, so Dan decides to step in, but Linehalt and Ren ask him to stay out of the fight. Barodius begins taunting Ren, and Linehalt begins exhibiting his Forbidden Power, to the point where it begins to tear Neathia apart. The Sacred Orb, in response to Linehalt's power, sends out its last defense: Dragonoid Colossus. Dragonoid Colossus arrives in time and subdues Linehalt before entering Dan's BakuMeter. Ren realizes that he must live in seclusion to avoid Linehalt's power from causing harm and begins to leave, but is stopped by the brawlers. They welcome him back into their group insisting that Linehalt's power could do a lot of good as it could harm, Ren, feeling happy to be accepted back to the group, transforms into his human form. Fabia, however, is not so sure about their new teammate.
130	26	"Forgiveness" ("Thoughts"); Transliteration: "Omoi" (Japanese: 想い)	October 2, 2011	October 16, 2010
Elright explains that, as a last resort, the third shield is programmed to expel anyone with Gundalian DNA. Dan asks if they can just shut the shield off to let Ren in, but Fabia refuses and leaves. Serena explains the origins of her hatred to the Gundalians: Aranaut was originally partnered with Commander Jin, Fabia's fiance, but they were defeated by Kazarina. Jin was unfortunately lost in battle and Aranaut was taken captive and experimented on. Fabia single handedly infiltrated the Gundalian palace and rescued Aranaut, who has no memory of Jin. While Marucho searches for Ren, Dan asks Fabia to give Ren a chance. So, everyone heads to find Ren and Marucho as Fabia challenges Ren to a battle. The stakes: if Ren wins, he can stay, but if he loses, he must leave Neathia forever. Ren puts in Linehalt and Rubanoid but they both fall to Aranaut. Knowing the conditions of his defeat, Ren is over come with despair. However, Fabia is convinced that he has changed and welcomes him to the brawlers. Ren is made a Castle Knight by Queen Serena and swears loyalty to her and the brawlers.
131	27	"Into the Storm" ("Storm"); Transliteration: "Arashi" (Japanese: 嵐)	October 9, 2011	October 23, 2010
Soon after Ren joined the Castle Knights, the Gundalians begin attacking the third shield. When they find that the third shield contains a DNA barrier, they retreat back to Gundalia for a new strategy. Meanwhile, the Neathians send out patrols to watch out for any Gundalians attacking while a geomagnetic storm (something that disrupts their radars) is taking place, with the Brawlers divided into groups of two to help the patrols. Dan and Jake are in one group, and they soon find an Earth boy named Robin who claims to have escaped the Gundalians' clutches and wants to find his sister. Jake wants to help him, but Dan tries to hold him back, as it is too dangerous, fearing that it may be a trick by the Gundalians. Jake then decides to look for Robin himself, but it turns out to be a trap, as Robin was brainwashed by the Gundalians all along. Kazarina appears and challenges Jake to a battle. Jake doesn't back down and is determined to free the brainwashed children from the Gundalians. Meanwhile, Dan reports back what had happened and the others scolded him for letting Jake go out on his own, so they all go out to look for him. Kazarina lays it hard on Jake and proves to be too much for the inexperienced brawler to handle. Jake scolds Kazarina for using other people to do her dirty work, to which she replies all the children are safe back on Earth, having outgrown their usefulness as strong battlers and she now uses them to bring in stronger subjects...like Jake. The rest of the Brawlers arrive just as Jake is defeated. He apologizes for not having listened to Dan and is taken by Kazarina.
132	28	"Jake Returns" ("And then..."); Transliteration: "Soshite" (Japanese: そして)	October 23, 2011	October 30, 2010
Jake has been captured by Kazarina and is tortured by her. Meanwhile, Dan eagerly wants to rescue him, feeling that their argument was his fault but everyone tries to talk him out of it. Just then Jake suddenly walks right back into Neathia, claiming to have escaped, however, Shun is not easily convinced of this. Dan begins suspecting that something must be wrong with Jake when he begins suggesting making changes to the third shield. Later that night, Jake heads to tamper with the shield controller and get teleported to Dan, who had set the trap with Captain Elright earlier. Jake finally reveals he and Coredem have been brainwashed by Kazarina and a battle ensues. The battle proves to be too much for Dan to handle due to the new and powerful ability card Kazarina had entrusted Jake with. Just then, Shun steps in and they take out Coredem, however Jake does not return to normal and is taken back by Kazarina. Dan vows to rescue his friend.
133	29	"Genesis" ("Trial"); Transliteration: "Shiren" (Japanese: 試練)	October 30, 2011	November 6, 2010
Dan is still upset about losing Jake and wants to rescue him, but Queen Serena forbids it, as it is too dangerous. Linus arrives to bring them all lunch, when Dan and Drago are suddenly pulled away by Dragonoid Colossus to a place between dimensions. There he meets Nurzak and Mason. Dragonoid Colossus explains that if Dan wants to leave, he must defeat him in battle and a battle ensues, Dragonoid Colossus easily gaining the upper hand. As the battle goes on, Nurzak explains that the Sacred Orb is the origin of all Bakugan and that Dragonoid Colossus has been tasked with protecting it. Only two are able to defeat him, the dragon of fire and of darkness: Dragonoid and Dharaknoid and if Drago loses, they will just be giving Dharak the chance to take the Sacred Orb. Dan and Drago manage to pull through and defeat Dragonoid Colossus. Dragonoid Colossus takes Dan and Drago and tells them the rest of the story of the Sacred Orb: the first two bakugan born from the Sacred Orb were Dragonoid and Dharaknoid and every bakugan was born from their DNA sequence. Drago accepts his responsibility and evolves into Blitz Dragonoid. They return to Neathia, bringing along Nurzak and Mason, who decide to fight against Gundalia, although Fabia warns that she will be watching them. Riding Dragonoid Colossus, they head to Gundalia to rescue Jake.
134	30	"Infiltrated" ("The Greatest Ever Strategy"); Transliteration: "Shijōsaidai no sakusen" (Japanese: 史上最大の作戦)	November 6, 2011	November 13, 2010
While the Brawlers are on their way to Gundalia, Ren tells the others that he wishes to save the rest of his team from Kazarina's lab, to which the other Brawlers agree. Ren, Fabia, Mason, and Nurzak split off from the rest of the team to rescue them. Dan, Marucho and Shun make their way inside the palace to find Jake. Meanwhile, Barodius orders Gill and Airzel to separate Dan from the others so that he may defeat Dan and take Dragonoid Colossus. Dan is separated from Shun and Marucho who battle Airzel and Gill. Shun manages to take out Airzel, but he and Marucho fall to Gill. Before Gill and Airzel can do anything else, Shun throws a smoke ball and the two of them escape. Meanwhile, Dan is still lost within the Gundalian castle when a door opens up to a strange room and he is confronted by Barodius.
135	31	"True Evolution" ("Light and Shadow"); Transliteration: "Hikari to kage" (Japanese: 光と影)	November 13, 2011	November 20, 2010
Dan and Barodius immediately battle with Drago easily tearing through Dharak's Exokor. However, Dragonoid Colossus informs Dan that Drago and Dharak are too evenly matched and that Drago must win at all costs. Despite another evolution, it seems as though Drago barely matches up to Dharak in terms of power. Meanwhile, Nurzak suggests they split up again, himself with Fabia and Ren with Mason, in hopes of surprising Kazarina, having already lost the element of surprise earlier. Dragonoid Colossus explains that despite changing in appearance and gaining new powers, Drago has yet to reach his true evolution. Drago begins to worry that he is not worthy of protecting the Sacred Orb, but Dan assures him that they have defeated evil many times before because they believed in themselves. With Drago's confidence restored, a brand new ability is unlocked, which Drago uses to win the battle. Dan demands to have Jake returned and Barodius complies, but Jake is still under the influence of Gundalian hypnosis and attacks Dan, knocking him out in the process. Meanwhile, Nurzak and Fabia get close to Kazarina's lab where she and Stoica confront them.
136	32	"Redemption" ("The Rescue"); Transliteration: "Kyūshutsu" (Japanese: 救出)	November 20, 2011	November 27, 2010
Dan is caught off guard by Jake and is imprisoned in a cell that keeps Drago in ball form. Meanwhile, Fabia and Nurzak engage in battle with Kazarina and Stoica, giving Ren and Mason a chance to break in and rescue Zenet, Lena and Jesse. However, once they reach the lab, they are nowhere to be seen. Kazarina and Stoica press on the attack, causing Fabia and Nurzak to fall down a cliff. However that was part of their plan. Nurzak tells Fabia a story of a man who thrived to fight so much that he led a group of soldiers, including his daughter, into a battle they were unprepared for, resulting in the girl's death. Nurzak laments that Fabia reminds him of her. Suddenly, Kazarina and Stoica discover they have survived and another battle ensues. Meanwhile, Shun and Marucho have snuck into the palace under the guise of guards while Kazarina reveals a surprise: a hypnotized Lena, Jesse and Zenet. Stoica begins flooding the battlefield, forcing Kazarina, Lena, Zenet and Jesse to retreat. Nurzak saves Fabia while he and Sabator are carried away by the water. Nurzak has a vision of his daughter, Floria, and is pleased to know he will be with her soon. After Aranaut is unable to find them, Ren and Mason come across him and Fabia. Kazarina returns to where Dan and Drago are being held and tricks Dan and Drago into looking into her eyes. They fall, unconscious, and are put into a coma.
137	33	"Jake's Last Stand" ("Prisoner"); Transliteration: "Toriko" (Japanese: 虜)	November 27, 2011	December 4, 2010
With Dan and Drago captured, Kazarina discovers similarities between Drago and Dharak's DNA and discovers a way to use that DNA to make Dharak evolve. Fabia informs Ren and Mason about Jesse, Lena, and Zenet being hypnotized so Mason takes them to Nurzak's secret lair. Meanwhile, Shun and Marucho split up to find Dan and Jake. Shun discovers Dan but is forced to escape after being discovered by Lumagrowl. Marucho however, gets dragged into a presentation in which Jake teaches the Gundalian soldiers how to defeat the brawlers. Marucho is so distraught by how much Jake has changed and challenges him to a battle. Marucho tries a number of times to reach out to Jake, but fails. After the battle is over, the floor begins cracking and Marucho falls. Luckily, Shun arrives in time to save him and they head to meet the others.
138	34	"Final Strike" ("Evolution"); Transliteration: "Shinka" (Japanese: 進化)	December 4, 2011	December 11, 2010
Ren and Fabia reunite with Shun and Marucho and regroup with Mason at Nurzak's secret lair. Meanwhile, Kazarina's experiments have succeeded and she is ready to splice Drago's DNA with Dharak's. This results in Dharak evolving into Phantom Dharak as well as his DNA no longer containing Gundalian DNA, allowing him to pass the third shield. In return, Barodius names Kazarina his second in command, demoting Gill in the process. Mason decides to go look for Nurzak, as there is a chance he survived while the others break into the castle to find Dan. As the Brawlers break into the Gundalian's lair, they run into all kinds of trouble. Ren has to stay back to face Gill, Marucho fights Airzel and Shun deals with Stoica. Kazarina prepares to finish Dan off and Jake is there to watch her, while Fabia is the only one left who will be able to find Dan in time. But Jake seems to be regaining control as he does not destroy Dan when given the chance to. Will he save Dan and snap out of his trance?
139	35	"Dream Escape" ("Memories"); Transliteration: "Kioku" (Japanese: 記憶)	December 11, 2011	December 18, 2010
Just as Kazarina is about to finish Dan off, Jake breaks free of the hypnosis and stops her. Fabia arrives and holds off Lumagrowl while Jake and Coredem rescue Dan and Drago. During the battle, Kazarina and Lumagrowl reveal Aranaut's last time on Gundalia: when Jin was killed and he was captured. Aranaut reveals he knew the entire time and was only faking because Fabia had never mentioned Jin because she wanted to protect him. Dan comes too and he and Jake join the battle, causing Kazarina to run away. Dan, Jake and Fabia reunite with the others and fight the Twelve Orders. The Brawlers suddenly notice that Barodius is missing: he has gone to Neathia to attack!! Dharak destroys the third shield and the Neathians lay waste to the city. Dragonoid Colossus appears to take everyone back to Neathia, but the Twelve Orders summon their Bakugan to stop them.
140	36	"Gundalian Showdown" ("Return"); Transliteration: "Kikan" (Japanese: 帰還)	December 25, 2011	January 8, 2011
The brawlers must head back to Neathia to defend it from Dharak's attack but Kazarina, Stoica, Gill and Airzel are determined to keep them on Gundalia. The brawlers manage to fight them off and escape, but Fabia remains behind to fight Kazarina, as she has a vendetta against her for the death of her fiance, Jin. The brawlers quickly make their way back to Neathia, with the Gundalian forces close behind, as Elright and Linus who has Rubanoid as his partner attempt to fight back. Meanwhile, Fabia and Aranaut are taking a beating and things look grim. Suddenly, Avoir flies in and saves them with Mason and Nurzak as the brawlers arrive on Neathia.
141	37	"Broken Spell" ("Assassin"); Transliteration: "Shikaku" (Japanese: 刺客)	January 8, 2012	January 15, 2011
Just as the Brawlers return to Neathia, Fabia and Kazarina continue their battle. However, Lumagrowl begins disobeying Kazarina's orders and is determined to finish off Aranaut with or without her. Nurzak confronts Kazarina and tries to convince her that Barodius is just using her but she refuses to listen, claiming that Barodius will make her his queen. She flees from the battle and is confronted by Gill, who kills her, thus freeing Lena, Zenet and Jesse from her control. Ren fills his ex-teammates on what has happened and Lena, Zenet and Jesse decide to join and fight for Neathia, changing back to their human forms. As Fabia, Mason and Nurzak make their way back to Neathia, the epic battle between the Brawlers and Phantom Dharak begins.
142	38	"Code Eve" ("Eve"); Transliteration: "Ivu" (Japanese: イヴ)	January 15, 2012	January 22, 2011
Nurzak, Mason and Fabia attempt to return to Neathia on Nurzak's ship but they are stopped by Gill, though they do manage to escape and arrive just in time to help the brawlers. Lena, Zenet and Jesse are surprised to see Nurzak and Mason alive, but are nonetheless happy. Gill arrives on the scene and tries to convince Barodius that Fabia killed Kazarina. However, Barodius knows it was actually Gill who killed her and shoots down his ship, along with Airzel who tried to save him. Barodius leaves to confront Queen Serena so Dragonoid Colossus takes Dan to the Palace to protect the Orb while the others hold off Dharak. In a show of outstanding power, Dharak shoots down Dragonoid Colossus (along with Stoica), who drops Dan at the Palace, and returns to lay waste to the rest of the brawlers, leaving him and Drago the last ones standing. Barodius confronts Serena, who refuses to back down. Barodius prepares to attack her, but Dan arrives in time to stop him. However, the all-powerful Sacred Orb teleports them to an unknown area and reveals itself to be called "Code Eve," the mother of all existing bakugan.
143	39	"Destiny Revealed" ("The Last Warrior"); Transliteration: "Saigo no senshi" (Japanese: 最後の戦士)	January 22, 2012	January 29, 2011
Code Eve explains that in the beginning, Dragonoid and Dharaknoid had battled each other and the result split the universe in two (Dragonoid's half formed into Vestroia and Dharaknoid's half created Neathia and Gundalia) which is why she had brought them to a mid dimension to battle, so no innocents would come to harm. Drago struggles against Dharak, and is knocked out and reverts to a primal state, relying solely on instinct, but Dan manages to snap him out of it. Meanwhile, everyone awakens after being defeated by Dharak and Linehalt is upset at the devastation so he uses his Forbidden Power to restore the war torn Neathia. Drago eventually manages to defeat Dharak and they are all returned to Neathia. However, Barodius decides to take the Sacred Orb's power for himself but its power is too much for Dharak to take in and they are destroyed. Code Eve awards Drago the Sacred Orb's almighty and limitless strength and abilities and he evolves into Titanium Dragonoid. With the war finally over, Nurzak, Ren, and the rest of his team create a formal alliance with the Neathians and leave to form a new government on Gundalia. Dan, Drago, Marucho, Shun, and Jake return to Earth, and say goodbye to the Neathians as well as Akwimos, Hawktor, and Coredem (who must stay on Neathia). The four Brawlers return to Earth and are greeted by Julie and Dan's mom. Later, they return to Bakugan Interspace, where everything has returned to normal and Dan ends up battling Koji.
