= List of Scream (film series) characters =

Cast of American slasher film series

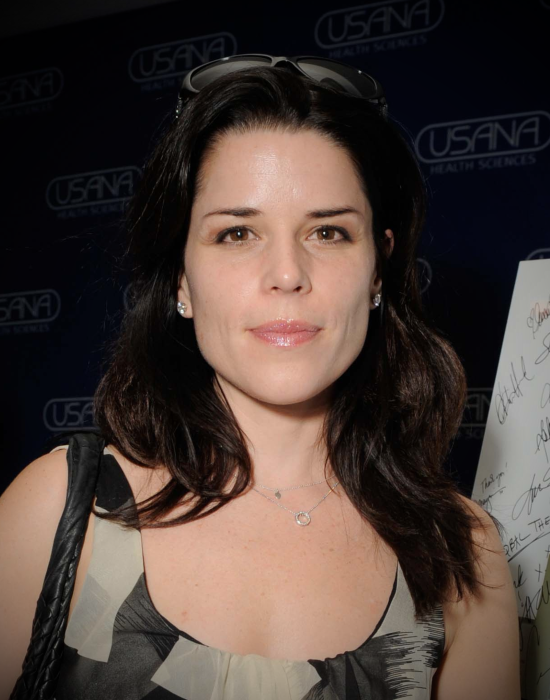
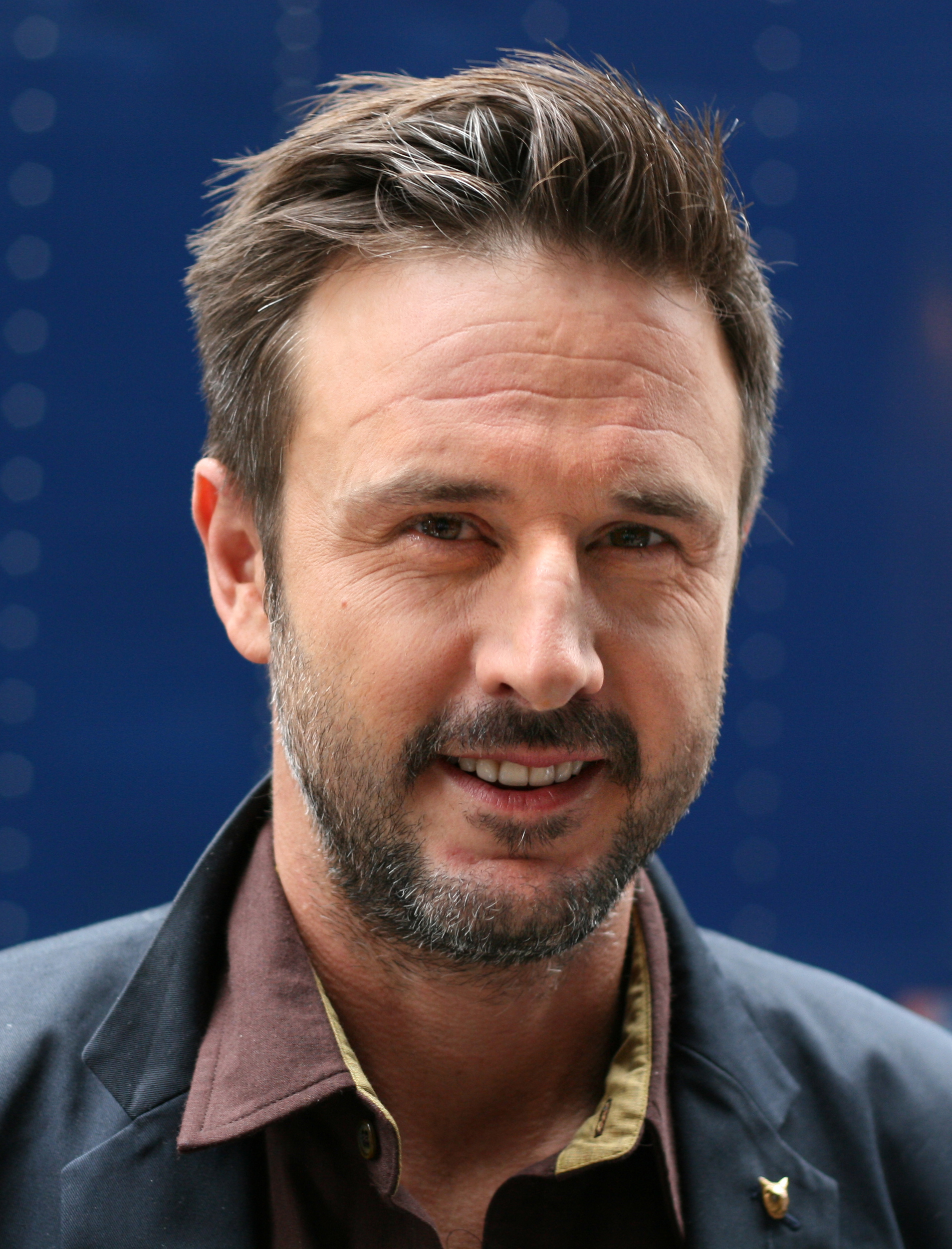
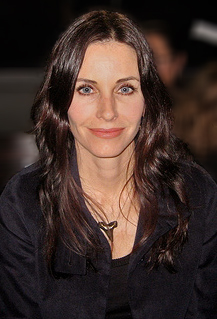
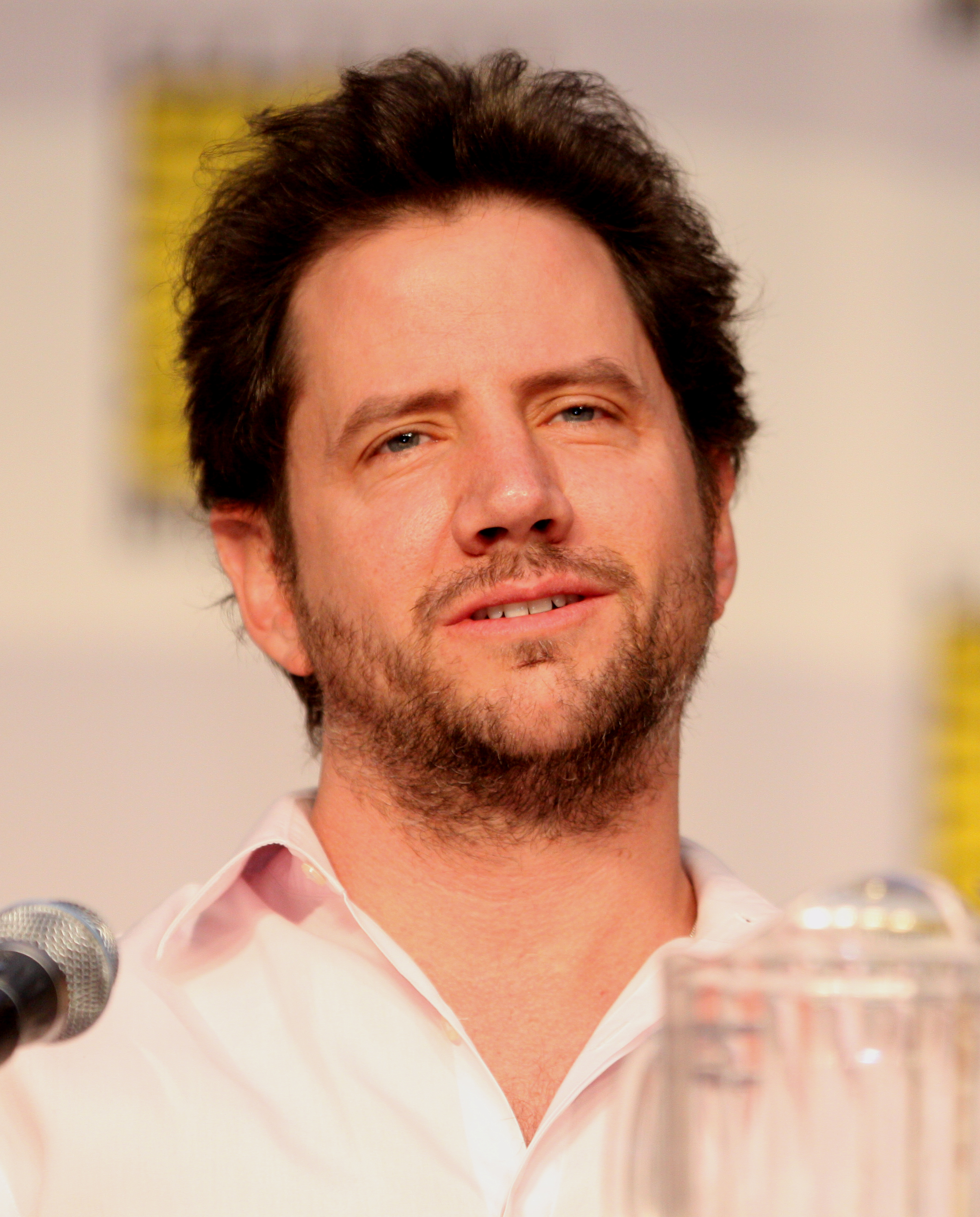
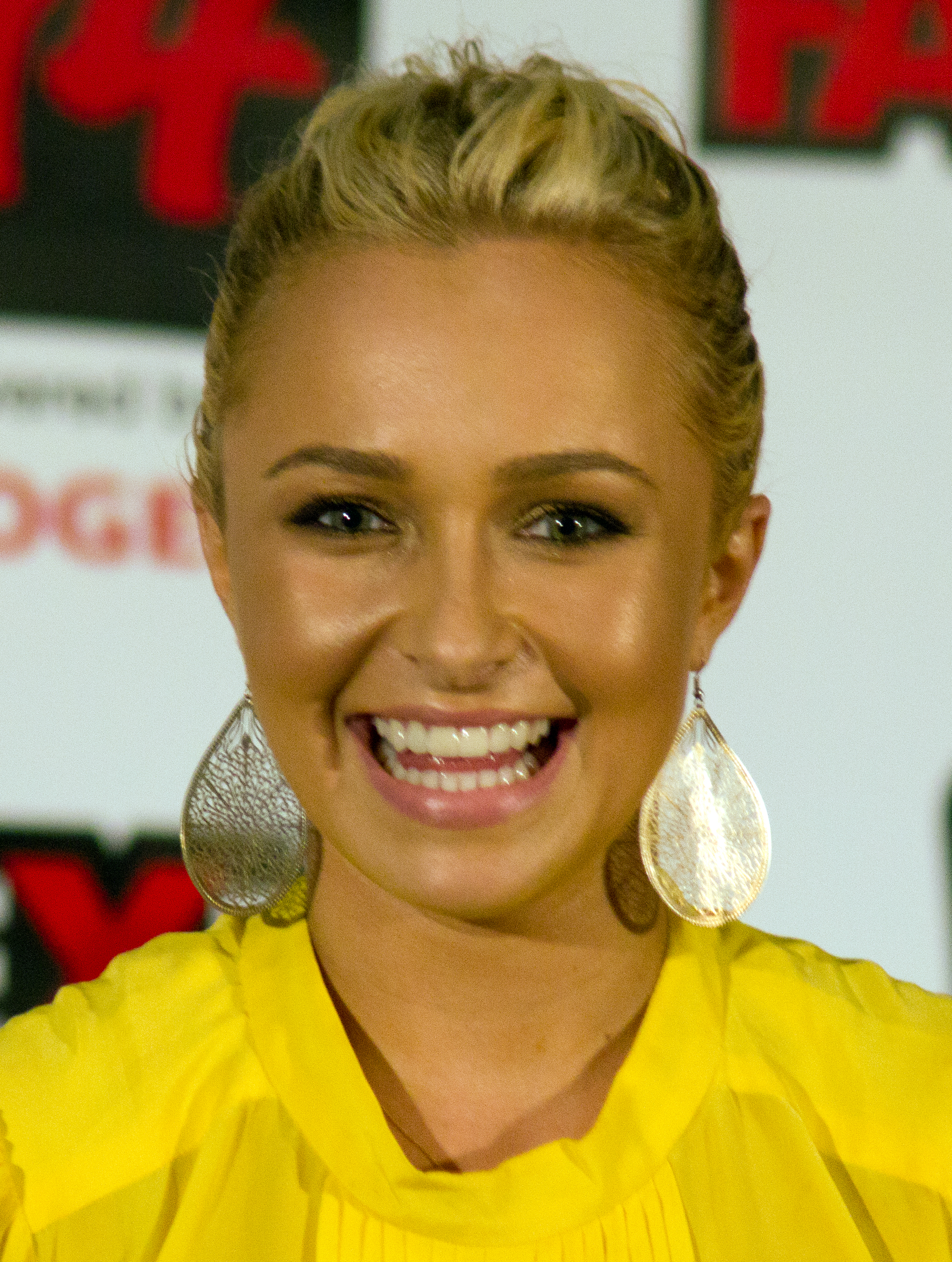
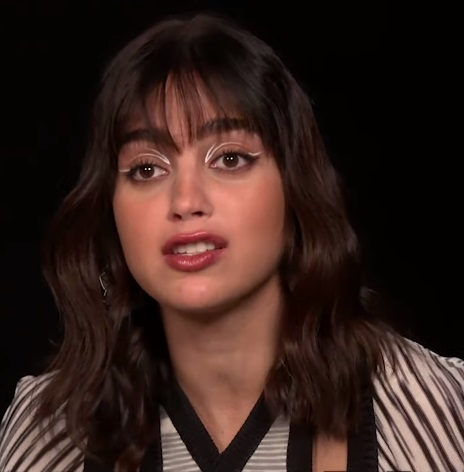
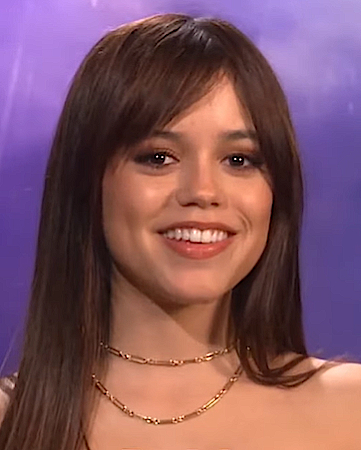
Neve Campbell, David Arquette and Courteney Cox have central roles in the first four films, supporting roles in the fifth film, with only Cox returning for the sixth film, and the three of them appearing again in the seventh film. Jamie Kennedy has a central role in the first two films and an appearance in the third film, and Hayden Panettiere has a central role in the fourth and sixth films, while Melissa Barrera and Jenna Ortega have central roles in the fifth and sixth films.

The American slasher film series Scream features a large cast of characters, many of whom were created by Kevin Williamson with contributions from Wes Craven (who directed the first four installments in the series) and Ehren Kruger (who wrote the third), and subsequently by new writers Guy Busick and James Vanderbilt with contributions from directors Matt Bettinelli-Olpin and Tyler Gillett, and producer Chad Villella. The series comprises seven films: Scream (1996), Scream 2 (1997), Scream 3 (2000), Scream 4 (2011), Scream (2022), Scream VI (2023), and Scream 7 (2026).

The series focuses on a succession of murderers who adopt a ghost-like disguise, dubbed Ghostface (voiced by Roger L. Jackson) who taunt and attempt to kill Sidney Prescott (Neve Campbell) in the first four films. She is assisted by ambitious news reporter Gale Weathers (Courteney Cox) and police officer Dewey Riley (David Arquette). The fifth and sixth films shift focus to half-sisters Sam and Tara Carpenter (Melissa Barrera and Jenna Ortega) and twin siblings Chad and Mindy Meeks-Martin (Mason Gooding and Jasmin Savoy Brown), referred to as the "Core Four" in the sixth film. The seventh film again centers around Sidney, with Ghostface also threatening her daughter Tatum (Isabel May). Other major recurring characters include film-geek Randy Meeks (Jamie Kennedy), falsely accused opportunist Cotton Weary (Liev Schreiber), single mother Judy Hicks (Marley Shelton), and FBI agent Kirby Reed (Hayden Panettiere).

The first four films in the series were directed by Craven and scored by Marco Beltrami. Williamson wrote Scream, Scream 2 and Scream 4, but scheduling commitments meant he could provide only notes for Scream 3, which was written by Ehren Kruger. Matt Bettinelli-Olpin and Tyler Gillett directed the fifth and sixth films, with writing duties helmed by James Vanderbilt and Guy Busick. Williamson later returned to writing Scream 7 (co-wrote with Guy Busick), which is also the first film in the franchise he directed.

Each film provides a motive and grounds for suspicion for several characters, concealing the identity of the true killer or killers until the finale, in which their identities and motivations are revealed.

== Cast overview ==
List indicators

This section includes characters who will appear or have appeared in more than two films in the series.

- An empty grey cell indicates the character was not in the film, or that the character's official presence has not yet been confirmed.
- ^{A} indicates an appearance through archival footage or audio.
- ^{C} indicates a cameo role.
- ^{M} indicates an appearance in onscreen movie footage.
- ^{P} indicates an appearance in onscreen photographs.
- ^{U} indicates an uncredited appearance.
- ^{V} indicates a voice-only role.

Character	Film						
Character	Scream	Scream 2	Scream 3	Scream 4	Scream	Scream VI	Scream 7
Character	1996	1997	2000	2011	2022	2023	2026
Ghostface	Roger L. Jackson^{V} (Note: Also voiced by Beth Toussaint, Neve Campbell, Liev Schreiber, Courteney Cox, David Arquette, and Lynn McRee during Scream 3)	Roger L. Jackson^{V}	Roger L. Jackson^{V}	Roger L. Jackson^{V}	Roger L. Jackson^{V}	Roger L. Jackson^{V}	Roger L. Jackson^{V}
Sidney Prescott	Neve Campbell	Neve Campbell	Neve Campbell	Neve Campbell	Neve Campbell		Neve Campbell
Dewey Riley	David Arquette	David Arquette	David Arquette	David Arquette	David Arquette	David Arquette^{P}^{U}	David Arquette^{C}^{M}
Gale Weathers	Courteney Cox	Courteney Cox	Courteney Cox	Courteney Cox	Courteney Cox	Courteney Cox	Courteney Cox
Billy Loomis	Skeet Ulrich		Skeet Ulrich^{V}^{A}^{U}		Skeet Ulrich (Note: Ulrich appears in Scream (2022) and Scream VI de-aged to appear as he did in Scream (1996).)	Skeet Ulrich	
Randy Meeks	Jamie Kennedy	Jamie Kennedy	Jamie Kennedy^{C}^{M}		Jamie Kennedy^{P} (Note: Credited with "Special Thanks".)		
Cotton Weary	Liev Schreiber^{C}^{M}	Liev Schreiber	Liev Schreiber				
Casey Becker	Drew Barrymore	Heather Graham^{C}^{M}		Heather Graham^{C}^{M}^{U}			
Stu Macher	Matthew Lillard		Matthew Lillard^{V}^{A}^{U}			Matthew Lillard^{P}^{U}	Matthew Lillard^{M}
Nancy Loomis		Laurie Metcalf				Laurie Metcalf^{P}^{U}	Laurie Metcalf^{C}^{M}
Roman Bridger			Scott Foley		Scott Foley^{M}^{C}^{U}	Scott Foley^{P}^{U}	Scott Foley^{C}^{M}
Martha Meeks			Heather Matarazzo		Heather Matarazzo^{C}		
Kirby Reed				Hayden Panettiere	Hayden Panettiere^{P}	Hayden Panettiere	
Judy Hicks				Marley Shelton	Marley Shelton		
Sam Carpenter					Melissa Barrera	Melissa Barrera	
Tara Carpenter					Jenna Ortega	Jenna Ortega	
Chad Meeks-Martin					Mason Gooding	Mason Gooding	Mason Gooding
Mindy Meeks-Martin					Jasmin Savoy Brown	Jasmin Savoy Brown	Jasmin Savoy Brown
Richie Kirsch					Jack Quaid	Jack Quaid^{C}^{M}^{U}	
Maureen Prescott (née Roberts)	Lynn McRee^{P}	Lynn McRee (Note: A previously used photograph of Campbell and McRee from the original film is seen in Sidney's college dorm. McRee's presence is left unseen due to strategic camera work.)	Lynn McRee				
Neil Prescott	Lawrence Hecht		Lawrence Hecht				
Hank Loomis	C.W. Morgan		C.W. Morgan^{C}^{M}				
Reporter		Nancy O'Dell^{C}^{M}	Nancy O'Dell^{C}^{M}	Nancy O'Dell^{C}^{M}			

== Introduced in Scream (1996) ==
Scream is the first film in the Scream series. One year prior to the events of the film, Maureen Prescott is brutally raped and murdered, apparently by Cotton Weary. During the film, the fictional town of Woodsboro is again attacked by a murderer, who particularly targets Sidney Prescott, Maureen's daughter. Deputy Sheriff Dewey Riley investigates the murders, while news reporter Gale Weathers follows the story. Sidney, her boyfriend Billy Loomis and their friends Tatum Riley, Stu Macher and Randy Meeks try to survive the attacks. The killer is revealed as both Billy and Stu, who admit to having killed Maureen and framed Cotton for the act. Sidney then kills them both in retribution.

=== Principal Arthur Himbry ===
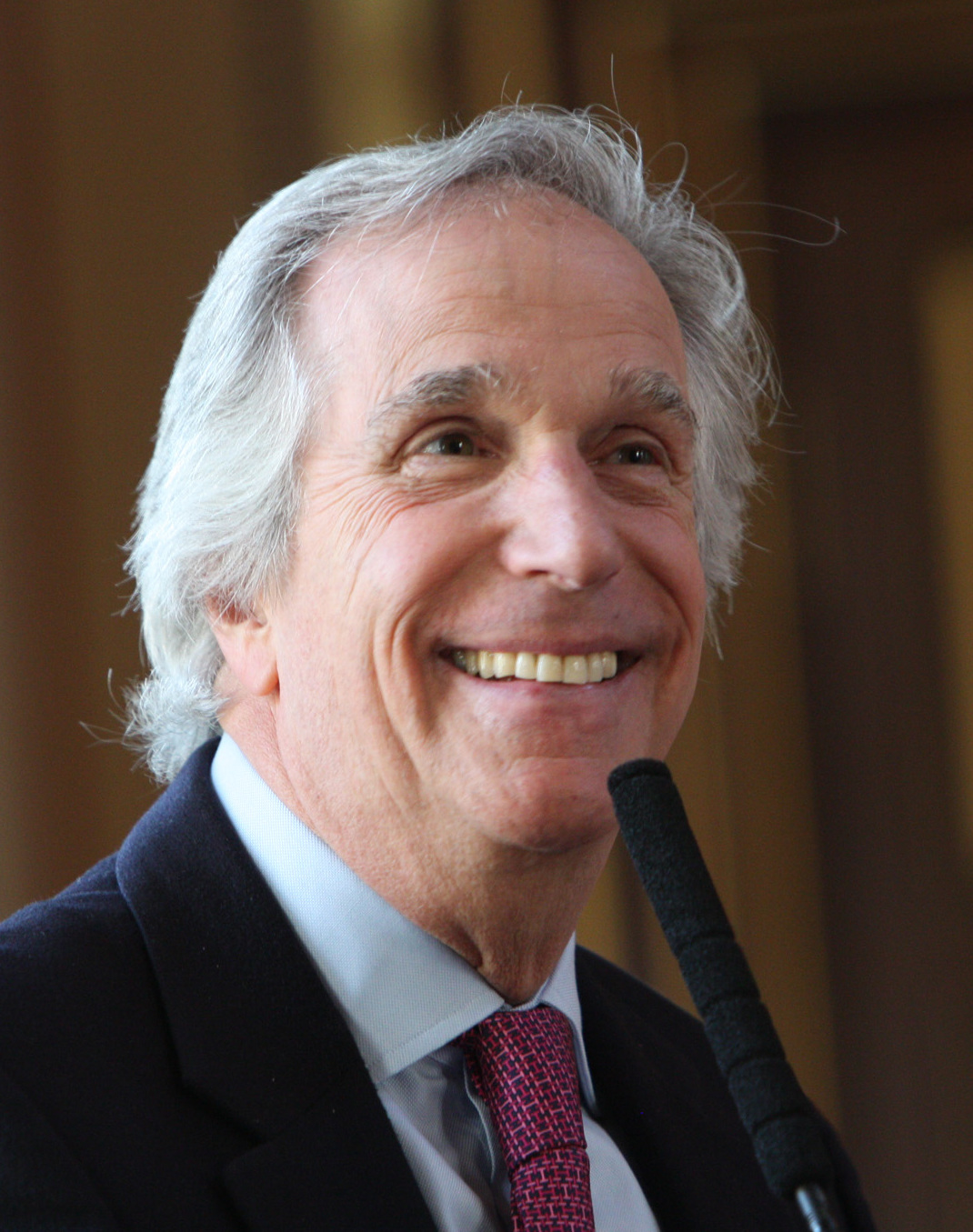

- Portrayed by Henry Winkler
- Appeared in: Scream (1996)
- Status: Deceased

Arthur Himbry is the principal of Woodsboro High School, attended by Sidney Prescott and her friends. He disciplines several students for wearing Ghostface masks, and comforts Sidney after she narrowly escapes the killer. While in his office, he is attacked by Ghostface and is stabbed to death. His body was said to have been discovered hanging up on the school's goalposts.

Scream producer Bob Weinstein had Himbry's death added to the film after he realized that the film had "30 pages of script" without a death occurring. This gave writer Kevin Williamson a reason for the teenagers to leave Stu Macher's party during the film's finale, a plot point Williamson had been struggling to formulate. The language used by Himbry and his aggressive actions towards the students were among several reasons why the film's production was forced to leave Santa Rosa High School; the school board found the film's content unacceptable and did not want it filmed there.

Winkler was uncredited in the film and was absent from posters and trailers.

=== Billy Loomis ===
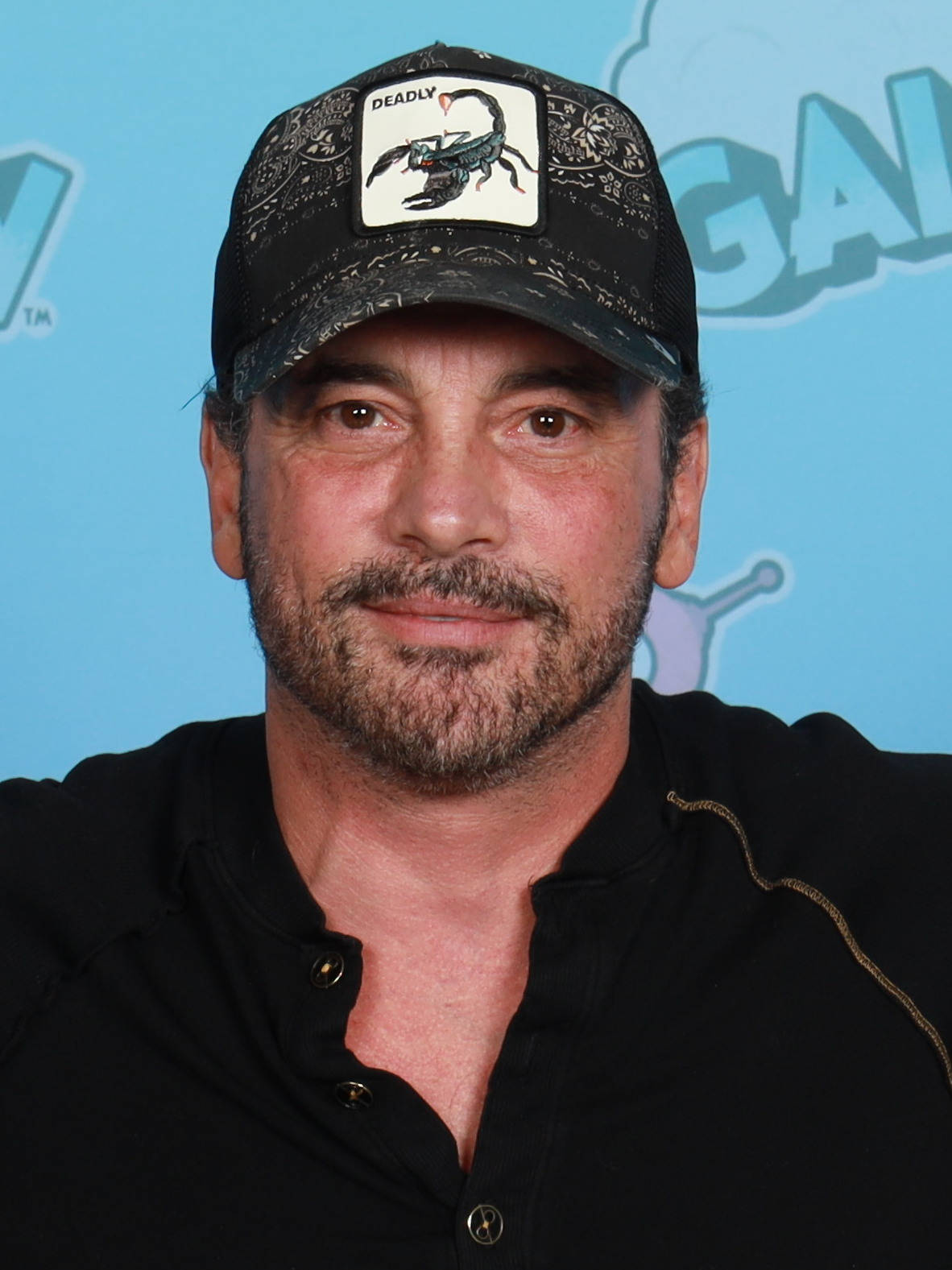

- Portrayed by Skeet Ulrich
- Appeared in: Scream (1996), Scream (2022) (hallucination), and Scream VI (hallucination)
- Status: Deceased

William "Billy" Loomis is a Woodsboro teenager, the boyfriend of Sidney Prescott and best friend of Stu Macher. He is also an avid fan of horror films. Following a series of murders, Billy becomes a suspect when he is found at Sidney's house with a cellphone shortly after she is taunted on the phone and attacked by a masked killer. Evidence is discovered that points to other characters, and Billy is removed as a suspect. During a party at Stu Macher's home, Billy and Sidney are reconciled and have sex, before Billy is stabbed by Ghostface. Later after a series of attacks, Billy is revealed to be alive and tries to help Sidney, obtaining in the process a gun which he then uses to shoot Randy Meeks. Billy then reveals himself to be the killer, having feigned the injury in the first place, with Stu confessing to be Billy's accomplice. The pair also admit to having murdered Sidney's mother, Maureen Prescott, one year previously, after she had an affair with Billy's father, causing Billy's parents to divorce and his mother to "abandon" him. Billy and Stu's plan to frame Sidney's father for their killing spree ultimately backfires when Sidney manages to escape and calls the police on them, while taunting Billy and Stu with a phone call, leaving Billy shocked and enraged. Despite his desperate attempts to kill Sidney, Billy is ultimately beaten by both her and reporter Gale Weathers, and finally dies after Sidney shoots him in the head.

In Scream 2, Billy's mother seeks revenge on Sidney for Billy's death. In Scream 3, Roman Bridger reveals that he provided Billy the evidence of his father's affair and gave him advice on how to kill Maureen. In Scream (2022), it is revealed that Billy cheated on Sidney during the events of the first film, fathering a daughter named Sam Carpenter (whom he wasn't aware of). Billy appears in her visions throughout the film and Scream VI, encouraging her to fight back against the killers trying to murder her, appearing both as the good man Sam wished he was, and also tempting her to become Ghostface herself.

In "Stab", the fictional film within a film based on the murders, Billy is portrayed by Luke Wilson. The character is parodied in the film Scary Movie as Bobby Prinze, portrayed by Jon Abrahams.

Kevin Patrick Walls and Justin Whalin were final contenders for the role of Billy Loomis before it was won by Skeet Ulrich. Walls was instead cast in the minor role of Steve Orth.

=== Casey Becker ===
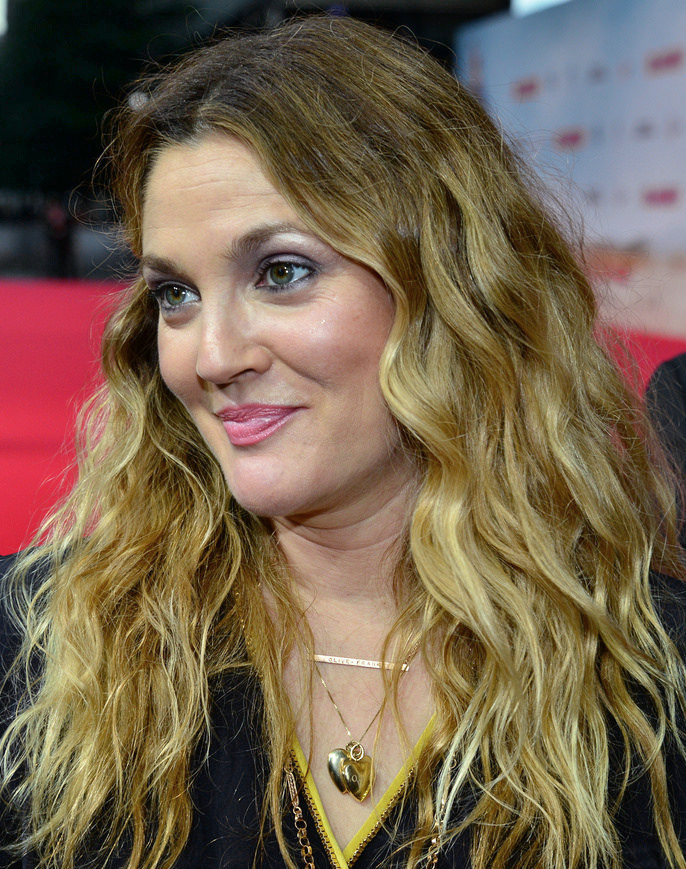
Barrymore was nominated for a Saturn Award for Best Supporting Actress for her role in Scream.

- Portrayed by Drew Barrymore
- Appeared in: Scream (1996)
- Status: Deceased

Casey Becker is a Woodsboro teenager and the former girlfriend of Stu Macher. After receiving a taunting and threatening phone call, she is ordered to answer horror film trivia questions to save the life of her boyfriend, Steven Orth. When she answers incorrectly, Steven is disemboweled and she is asked another question to save her own life. When she refuses to answer, Ghostface chases her down and kills her, leaving her hanged from a tree and disemboweled. Later, it is revealed by Billy Loomis and Stu (who are Casey's Ghostface killers) that even if she answered correctly, they would have killed her anyway. In "Stab", the fictional film within a film based on the murders, Casey is played by Heather Graham.

Barrymore was already a successful actress when she appeared in Scream, at a time when casting a big name for a horror film was uncommon. She was originally signed to play the role of Sidney after reading the script and approaching the production team herself. However she decided she would rather play the part of Casey Becker because of her connection to the character and wanting to deliver a shock to the audience. It was not due to a scheduling conflict even though a very popular rumor states it was. This has been debunked by Barrymore herself as well as Wes Craven. Like her co-stars Neve Campbell and Courteney Cox, her appearance is credited by Craven for raising the profile of the film and helping to attract a larger female audience.

Several scenes leading to Casey's eventual death gave rise to disputes between Craven and the Motion Picture Association of America (MPAA), the film rating board, who raised concerns over the violence and intensity of the scene. When she is initially stabbed in the chest by Ghostface, Craven insisted that he had only been able to make one successful take of the scene, so that no substitution was possible; he was, in fact, lying. The scene in which her corpse is hung from a tree and disemboweled was heavily edited: Craven was forced to remove all still shots of the body, and the scene itself was sped up to reduce its time on screen.

=== Cotton Weary ===
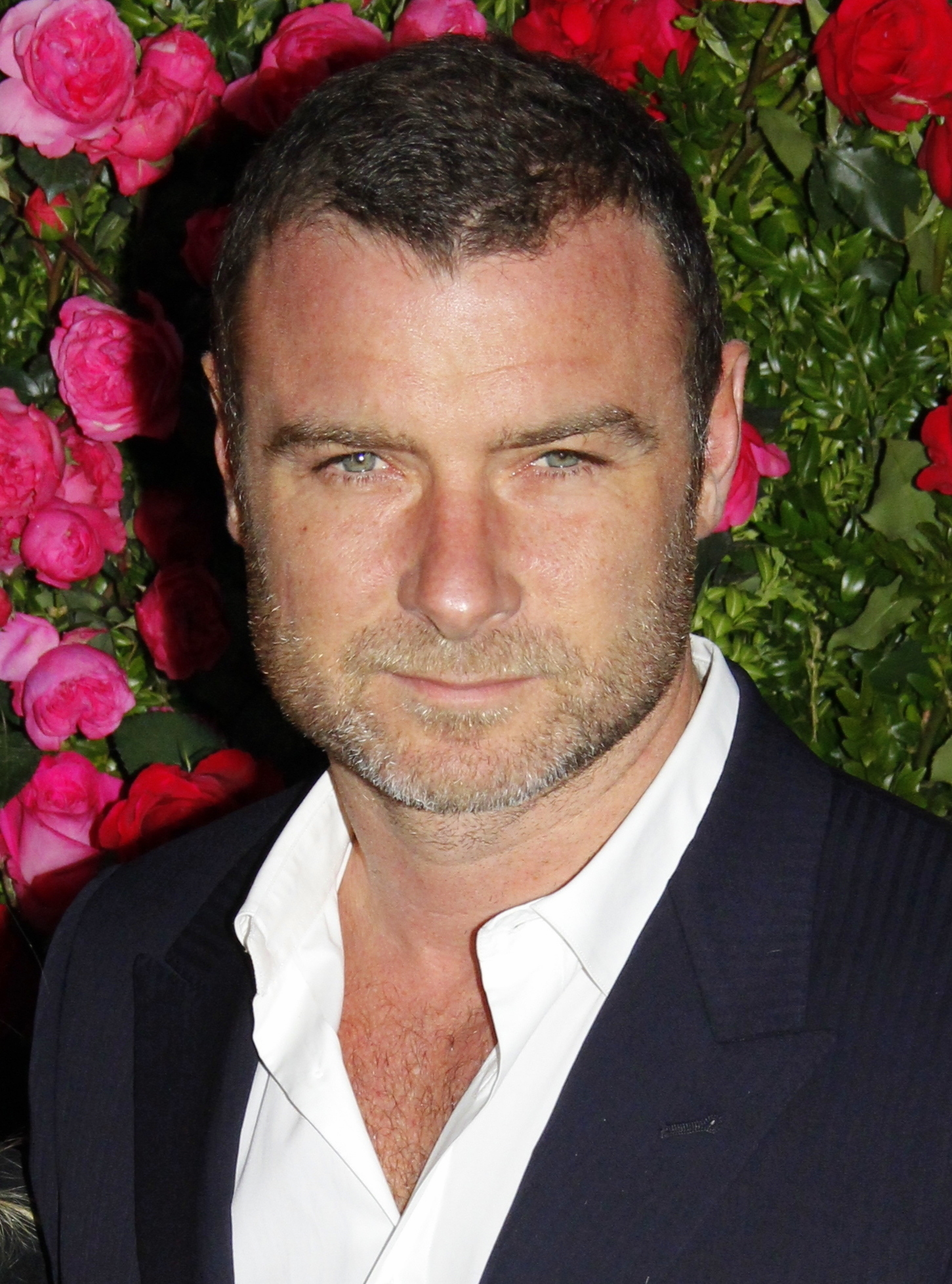
Liev Schreiber made a cameo appearance in the original Scream and reprised his role fully in Scream 2 and Scream 3.

- Portrayed by Liev Schreiber
- Appeared in: Scream (1996) (cameo), Scream 2, and Scream 3
- Status: Deceased

Cotton Weary was the original suspect in the rape and murder of Maureen Prescott, Sidney's mother. He was identified by Sidney, who found her mother's body after seeing someone she believed to be Cotton leaving her home. In Scream, it is revealed that Maureen was having an affair with Cotton before she was murdered by Billy Loomis and Stu Macher, who then planted evidence to frame Cotton. In Scream 2, Cotton attempts to gain fame from his incarceration and exoneration for Maureen's murder, traveling to Windsor College to convince Sidney to agree to an interview. He later saves Sidney when she is about to be murdered by Mrs. Loomis, one of the Ghostface killers in Scream 2. In Scream 3, Cotton has become famous for his exploits, hosting his own talk show. He and his girlfriend Christine Hamilton are attacked by the latest Ghostface, who demands to know the whereabouts of Sidney after she goes into hiding. When Cotton refuses to tell, Ghostface kills him.

In the original Scream 2 script, Cotton was captured by the real Ghostface killers, Derek Feldman, Hallie McDaniel and Mrs. Loomis. After Mrs. Loomis kills Derek and Hallie, she intends to frame Cotton for the recent murder spree, but he attacks and stabs her to death. He then tries to take revenge on Sidney for his false imprisonment, noting that the evidence points to him being an innocent victim. He and Sidney stab each other, but their fates have not been revealed. Following the leak of the script on the Internet, extensive rewrites were undertaken, changing this plot.

=== Dewey Riley ===
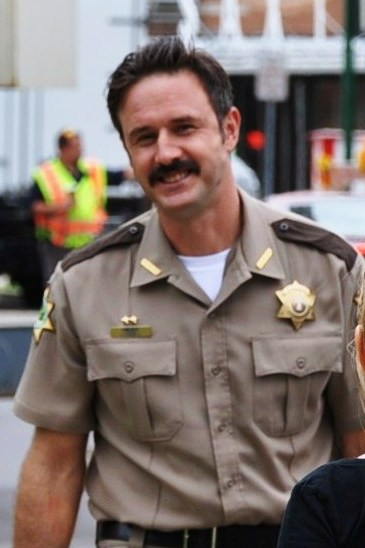
Arquette as his character Dewey Riley on the set of Scream 4.

- Portrayed by David Arquette
- Appeared in: Scream (1996), Scream 2, Scream 3, Scream 4, Scream (2022), Scream VI (photos only), and Scream 7 (cameo)
- Status: Deceased

Dwight "Dewey" Riley is the Deputy Sheriff of Woodsboro, the brother of Tatum Riley and friend of Sidney Prescott. After a series of murders, he helps lead the investigation, while pursuing a romance with Gale Weathers. He is stabbed by Ghostface during the finale of Scream, but survives. Dewey returns in Scream 2, suffering from a limp and weakened arm caused by nerve damage as a result of his stabbing. He travels to Windsor College to help Sidney after a series of copycat Ghostface murders. He is attacked and stabbed repeatedly by the current Ghostface but again survives. In Scream 3, he aids an investigation into a new Ghostface, later revealed to be Roman Bridger. Dewey shoots Roman in the head, killing him. In the aftermath he asks Gale to marry him, and she accepts. In Scream 4, Dewey has married Gale and returned with her to Woodsboro, becoming the new Sheriff and recovered from his past injuries. After a new series of Ghostface murders on the anniversary of Billy Loomis' and Stu Macher's spree, Dewey again investigates. By now, his relationship with Gale is strained, but, after Gale is badly injured by Ghostface, they resolve their differences. In the fifth installment of the series, also titled Scream, Dewey and Gale are divorced. After he saves Tara Carpenter from being murdered in the hospital, Ghostface stabs him in the stomach by surprise, pulling the knife up through his torso, causing his death. In Scream VI, the shrine scene shows a booth dedicated to Dewey, where we see his photographs and portraits, as well as badges and a gun. Dewey is mentioned several times by other characters (including Ghostface). In Scream 7, the killers create a highly realistic deepfake version of Dewey via AI manipulation to torment Sidney, where on his behalf they blame her for his demise and responsibility for the deaths of other loved ones and friends.

Dewey had been intended to die in the finale of the first installment of Scream. However, Craven filmed an additional scene, in which Dewey survives and is placed in an ambulance, in case test audiences reacted positively to the character. When they did, this scene was added to the film, and his death was instead depicted in the fifth installment of Scream in 2022, leaving fans devastated.

Arquette was originally brought in to audition for the role of Billy Loomis in Scream, but preferred the character of Dewey and requested to audition for that instead. Despite resistance from the production team, who were concerned that the role was described as "hunky", rather than the younger, goofier approach of Arquette, Craven appreciated the idea and cast him in the role.

In Stab, the fictional film within a film based on the Ghostface murders, and again in Stab 3, Dewey is portrayed by David Schwimmer and fictional actor Tom Prinze, respectively.

=== Gale Weathers ===
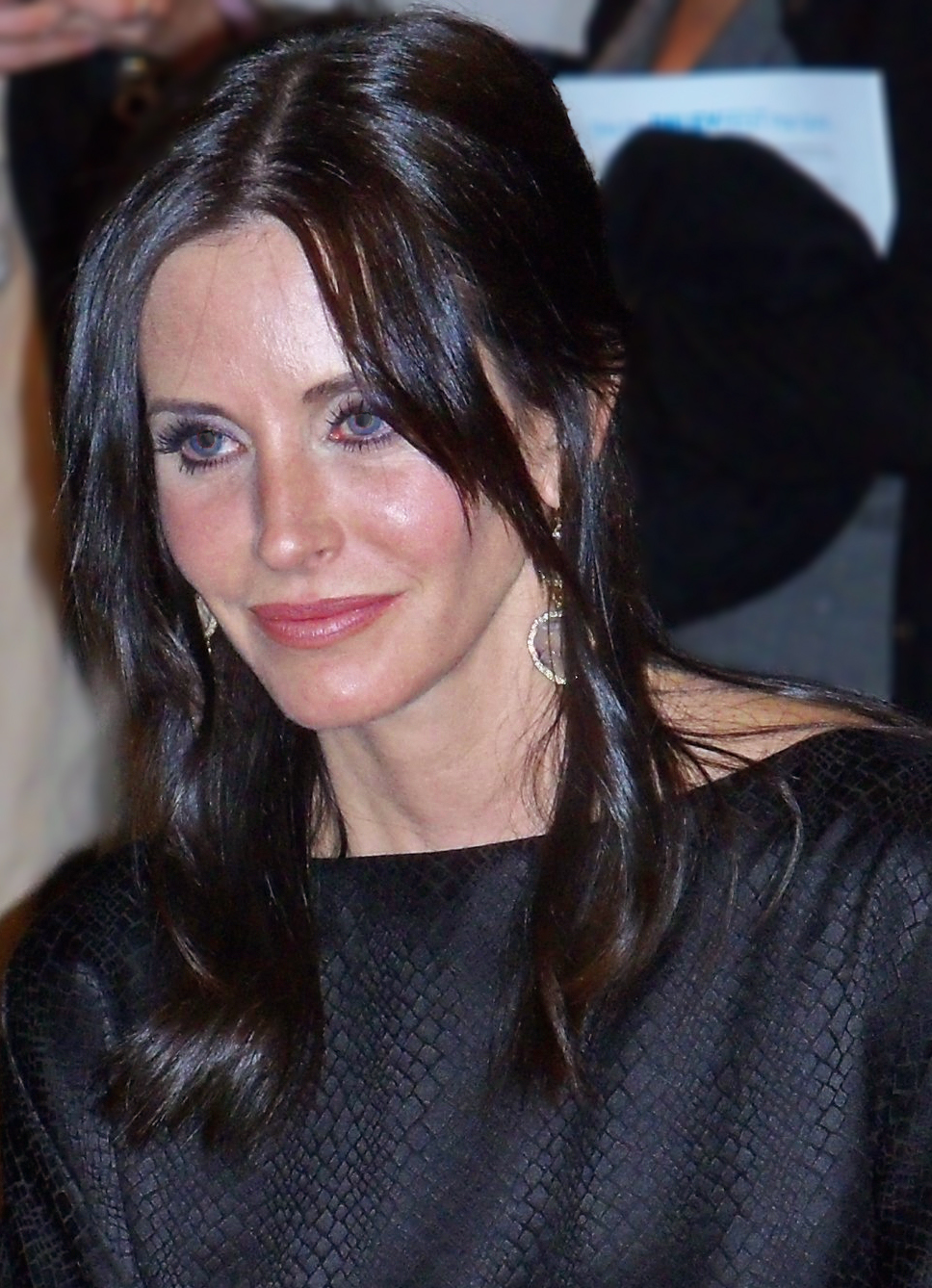
Cox was starring in the sitcom Friends when she took on the role of Gale Weathers.

- Portrayed by Courteney Cox
- Appeared in: Scream (1996), Scream 2, Scream 3, Scream 4, Scream (2022), Scream VI, and Scream 7
- Status: Alive

Gale Weathers is a news reporter for the fictional news show Top Story. Prior to the events of the films, she was involved in coverage of the murder of Maureen Prescott and the resulting trial of Cotton Weary, during which she criticized the testimony of Sidney Prescott. In Scream, she returns to Woodsboro to cover the current murder spree. During the finale of the film, her cameraman, Kenny Jones, is murdered, and she is left for dead after a car crash. She is later revealed to be alive and witnesses the confession of Billy Loomis and Stu Macher to their role in the killings. She helps Sidney defeat Billy and, after the events of the film, writes a new book about the Ghostface murders. In Scream 2, she travels to Windsor College to cover the current murder spree. She often clashed with reporter Debbie Salt, whom is revealed in the end as Nancy Loomis, Billy Loomis' mother. She witnesses the apparent death of Dewey Riley before she herself is shot by Mickey Altieri, one of the killers. She survives and helps Sidney to kill Mickey. In Scream 3, she is shown to have written another book, this time about the Windsor College killings. She travels to Hollywood to aid the investigation of a new series of murders there. At the end of the film, Dewey asks Gale to marry him, and she accepts. In Scream 4, Gale has married Dewey, becoming Gale Weathers-Riley, but their relationship is strained. She has written a series of novels about fictional Ghostface murders; these have been turned into new films in the fictional Stab series. She attempts to reignite her journalistic career by investigating the new murders, but is attacked and badly wounded by the new Ghostface. She survives and resolves her differences with Dewey.

In the fictional Stab series of films within a film, Gale is portrayed by fictional actress Jennifer Jolie.

Courteney Cox was starring in the NBC sitcom Friends when she was cast in Scream, marking a new trend: casting established and popular actors and actresses in horror films. Craven opined that her presence, like Neve Campbell's, helped raise the profile of Scream and attract a large female audience. Brooke Shields and Janeane Garofalo were the original choices for the role of Gale. Cox was not even considered at first, as it was not believed that she could play Gale's selfish, abusive and aggressive character after playing the softer, nicer role of Monica Geller in Friends. Cox, however, was eager to play a "bitch" character, specifically to contrast with her Friends character, and repeatedly lobbied the production team until she won the role.

=== Ghostface ===
- Portrayed by Roger L. Jackson (voice), Skeet Ulrich, Matthew Lillard, Laurie Metcalf, Timothy Olyphant, Scott Foley, Emma Roberts, Rory Culkin, Jack Quaid, Mikey Madison, Dermot Mulroney, Jack Champion, Liana Liberato, Tony Revolori, Anna Camp, Ethan Embry, Kraig Dane
- Appeared in: Scream (1996), Scream 2, Scream 3, Scream 4, Scream (TV series), Scream (2022), Scream VI, and Scream 7

Ghostface is a fictional identity, created in Scream by Sidney's boyfriend Billy Loomis and his friend Stu Macher to conduct a murder spree in the town of Woodsboro. The costume they use is a generic Halloween costume, officially called "Father Death", that allows anyone to adopt the identity and makes the killers difficult to identify. The killers taunt their victims on the phone before attacking, using a voice changer to disguise their true identity. While in costume, the character is voiced by voice actor Roger L. Jackson. The Ghostface identity is adopted by other killers after the death of Billy and Stu. In Scream 2, it is taken by Billy's mother Nancy Loomis and her accomplice, Mickey Altieri. In Scream 3, it is taken by Sidney's half-brother, Roman Bridger, the director of Stab 3. In Scream 4, on the anniversary of Billy and Stu's murder spree, a new Ghostface emerges, revealed to be Sidney's cousin Jill Roberts and her friend Charlie Walker. In Scream (2022), it's used by Richie Kirsch and Amber Freeman, who are respectively the boyfriend of Sam Carpenter and best friend of her sister Tara. In Scream VI, Ghostface is revealed to be Richie's entire family, father Wayne Bailey and siblings Ethan and Quinn. In Scream 7, Ghostface is Jessica Bowden, Sidney's neighbor; Marco Davis, a supervisor at a mental institution; and Karl Gibbs, a murderer from said institution. In the finale of each film, the current Ghostface killers confront the protagonist and explain their motivation for stalking her. In the finale of Scream VI, after the heroes gain the upper hand against the killers, Ghostface plays a more heroic role as he gives a taunting phone call to the Ghostface mastermind, Wayne Bailey, before making his entrance and stabbing a frightened Bailey multiple times. Ghostface is then revealed to be Sam, wearing Billy's robe and mask, who then ultimately kills Bailey by stabbing him in the eye.

Jackson, who voices Ghostface in all the Scream films, was chosen for the part after weeks of local casting in Santa Rosa, California. He was intended only as a temporary voice, to be replaced in the post-production phase of the film with a dubbed voice, but his contribution was retained because Craven felt he imbued the voice with a truly evil malevolence. He and the casts of the films were intentionally prevented from meeting for most if not all of each film's production, to discourage the cast from putting a face to the voice, and to make him seem more menacing when interacting with the characters on the phone.

=== Hank Loomis ===
- Portrayed by C.W. Morgan
- Appeared in: Scream (1996), and Scream 3 (archive footage)
- Status: Alive

Hank Loomis is the father of Billy, and the ex-husband of Mrs. Loomis. Hank is a lawyer and represents his son when Billy is brought in to the police station for questioning. It is later revealed that Hank was having an affair with Maureen Prescott, which is what led to his wife leaving him. In the promotional material for Scream 3, it is revealed that Hank used to be the main lawyer for Sunrise Studios, before leaving to set up his own law office in Woodsboro.

=== Kenny Jones ===
- Portrayed by W. Earl Brown
- Appeared in: Scream (1996)
- Status: Deceased

Kenneth "Kenny" Jones is Gale Weathers' cameraman on the fictional news show "Top Story". In Scream, Kenny accompanies Gale as she reports on the series of murders in Woodsboro. After seeing on a hidden camera that Randy Meeks is about to be murdered, he leaves his van to help, and his throat is slit by Ghostface. His surname is revealed in an Easter egg in the opening of Scream (2022 film).

Kenny's neck being slashed was one of the several scenes that had to be toned down by Craven at the behest of the MPAA in order to avoid the restrictive NC-17 rating. The scene was shortened because the MPAA felt that Kenny's expression after his throat was cut was too disturbing.

=== Maureen Prescott ===
- Portrayed by Lynn McRee
- Appeared in: Scream (1996) (photos only), Scream 2 (photo only), Scream 3 (voice only), and Scream 4 (photo only)
- Status: Deceased

Maureen Prescott (née Roberts) is the mother of Sidney Prescott and wife of Neil Prescott. She is murdered before the events of the Scream films but receives a mention in every film, with the first four films' killing spree motivations back to her in some way and being blamed by many (including Sidney) as the overall cause of the Ghostface spree. She conducted several extra-marital affairs, including those with Cotton Weary and Hank Loomis, the father of Billy Loomis. Cotton was arrested and convicted of her murder. In Scream, a killer taunts Sidney on the phone about her mother's murder; this killer is later identified as Sidney's boyfriend Billy Loomis and his friend Stu Macher. Billy reveals that it was he and Stu who murdered Maureen and framed Cotton for it. In Scream 3, the current Ghostface uses Maureen's synthesized voice and image to taunt Sidney and lure her out of hiding. The killer is unveiled as Roman Bridger, who reveals that he is Maureen's son and Sidney's half-brother. For a two-year period in her youth, before she met Sidney's father, Maureen had traveled to Hollywood to become an actress under the pseudonym Rina Reynolds. During this time she was impregnated with Roman by Hollywood producer John Milton, after being gang-raped. She then gave him up for adoption. After Maureen returned to Woodsboro, despite her marriage to Neil and their daughter's birth, the psychological trauma of the rape drove Maureen nymphomaniac. When the adult Roman found her, she denied she had been Rina and rejected him. Roman then proceeded to film her affairs and showed the footage to Billy before convincing him to kill Maureen, starting the chain of events that occur throughout the Scream films.

Scream 4 introduces Maureen's sister Kate Roberts and her niece Jill Roberts. Sidney observing a photo gallery of Maureen in Kate's home was filmed for Scream 4, but it was deleted from the final cut. Scream (2022) shows Gale's remorse for writing the book about her murder, believing she is responsible for the Ghostface killings after. Sidney reassures her, however, that it was Billy Loomis who started it and they will end it.

=== Neil Prescott ===
- Portrayed by Lawrence Hecht
- Appeared in: Scream (1996), and Scream 3
- Status: Unknown

Neil Prescott is the father of Sidney Prescott and widower of Maureen Prescott. In Scream, he leaves Woodsboro on business and later disappears without trace, raising suspicions that he may be the perpetrator of a series of murders in the town. It is revealed in the finale that he was kidnapped by the real killers, Billy Loomis and Stu Macher, who intended to frame him for their crimes. Neil is saved by his daughter. It is theorized that his absence from Scream 2 is to emphasize Sidney's independence in college; he is mentioned in-film as being out of the country on business. He appears briefly in Scream 3, commenting on Sidney's withdrawal from her friends and life. Scream 4 introduces his sister-in-law Kate Roberts and his niece Jill Roberts. In a deleted scene for Scream 4 Dewey mentions when Sidney returned to Woodsboro that Neil had passed away but his status of if he’s alive is unknown since it was in a deleted scene.

=== Randy Meeks ===
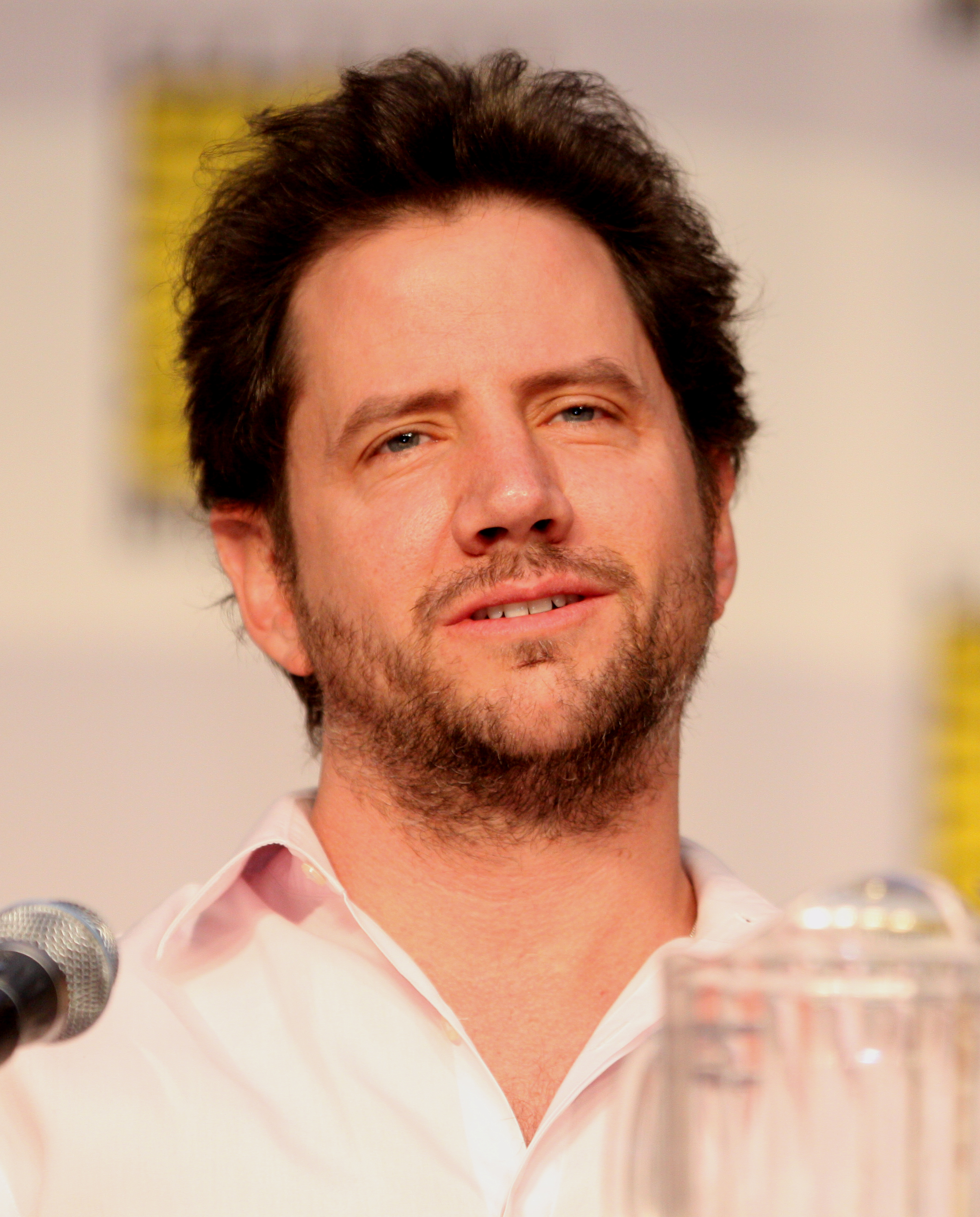
Jamie Kennedy stars in the first two Scream films, and cameos in the third.

- Portrayed by Jamie Kennedy
- Appeared in: Scream (1996), Scream 2, Scream 3 (cameo), and Scream (2022) (photo only)
- Status: Deceased

Randy Meeks is a Woodsboro teenager. He is a friend of Sidney Prescott, for whom he has romantic feelings, and is an avid fan of horror movies. He uses his knowledge of horror film plots and clichés to define the series of murders that occur in Scream, Scream 2 and Scream 3. In Scream, Randy is one of the suspects because of him habitually referencing horror movie trivia like Ghostface. He becomes suspicious of Stu Macher when he expresses no concern for his girlfriend Tatum Riley when she went missing, and then discovers that he is one of the Ghostface killers prior to him revealing himself to Sidney with Billy Loomis. Randy is later shot by Loomis but survives. In Scream 2, he attends the fictional Windsor College with Sidney, studying film. When a new series of murders begins, Randy taunts the killer over the phone, mocking Billy Loomis' in the previous film. During this call, the killer dragged him into a van and killed him. It is later revealed that Nancy Loomis, Billy's mother, killed Randy out of anger at his insults to her son. Randy appears posthumously in Scream 3 in a recorded video, in which he explains to Sidney the rules of a trilogy, similar to how he explained the rules in the first two films.

In the published screenplay for Scream, an alternate ending had Randy (rather than Sidney) kill Stu before asking Sidney out on a date. Before a script leak forced the rewriting of parts of the Scream 2 screenplay, Randy was to be Gale Weathers' cameraman rather than a student as shown in the finished film. His death, however, remained the same. Craven and Ehren Kruger considered bringing Randy back in Scream 3, revealing him to have survived his attack in Scream 2 but abandoned the idea as too unrealistic.

Casting for Randy was contested between Kennedy and Breckin Meyer. The production team favored Kennedy, as they believed he had certain qualities that made him more suitable than Meyer for the role. Kennedy, however, had had no major roles prior to Scream, and Dimension Films, the studio producing the films, was eager to have a more prominent actor in the production alongside the other well-known stars such as Barrymore and Cox. The production team itself, however, was adamant that Kennedy was the best choice and fought successfully to keep him in.

=== Sidney Prescott ===
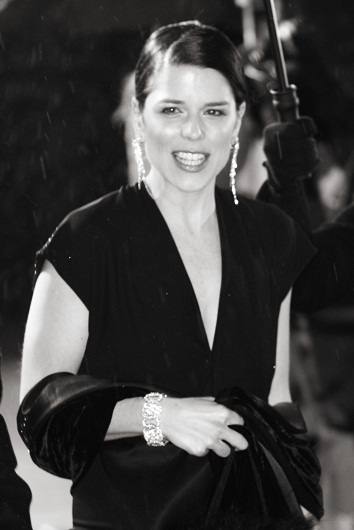
Neve Campbell (pictured) won the Saturn Award for Best Actress for her role in Scream.

- Portrayed by Neve Campbell
- Appeared in: Scream (1996), Scream 2, Scream 3, Scream 4, Scream (2022), and Scream 7
- Status: Alive

In Scream, a year after the murder of her mother Maureen, she is stalked by a killer, later revealed to be her boyfriend Billy Loomis and his friend Stu Macher. These two prove to have been Maureen's murderers, Billy being motivated by Maureen's affair with his father, which caused his mother to leave home. Sidney kills both of them in self-defense. In Scream 2, while attending college, she again becomes the target of a masked killer, this time her boyfriend's friend Mickey Altieri and Nancy Loomis, who is seeking revenge for the death of her son Billy Loomis. Once more Sidney manages to survive the attempts on her life. During Scream 3, she is drawn to Hollywood by yet another killer. She discovers that this one is her half-brother Roman Bridger, who wants to kill her out of anger at his abandonment by Maureen. In Scream 4, she returns to Woodsboro to promote her new self-help book about overcoming the tragedies of her life, but is targeted once again by a new Ghostface, who turns out to be her cousin Jill Roberts who is envious of Sidney's fame and wants to become the new "Sidney Prescott". In Scream (2022), Sidney is revealed to be married to Mark Evans, who appeared in Scream 7. They now have three daughters together; Tatum, Emma and Rebecca. Sidney returns to Woodsboro so that she and Gale can help Sam Carpenter and her sister Tara to kill the new Ghostfaces, avenging Dewey and the other victims. The character does not appear in Scream VI, but Gale Weathers states that Sidney and her husband, Mark, have gone into hiding with their three daughters in response to the latest killings in New York. Despite her absence, Campbell's likeness is applied via drawings in the abandoned Stab cave, showcasing every previous killing including some visual references of those events. Sidney reappears in Scream 7.

In the fictional films within a film Stab and Stab 2, based on the murders, Sidney is portrayed by Tori Spelling as herself. In Stab 3: Return to Woodsboro, she would have been portrayed by fictional actress Angelina Tyler; however, Angelina is killed by Ghostface.

Neve Campbell won the Saturn Award for Best Actress in 1997 for her role as Sidney Prescott in Scream and the MTV Movie Award for Best Female Performance in 1998 for her role in Scream 2. When she was cast in Scream, Campbell was starring in the television drama series Party of Five. It was previously unheard of to cast an established television actress in a horror film, but, following the success of this casting and that of Courteney Cox, the practice became common in many later horror films. Craven opined that their presence helped raise the profile of Scream and attract a large female audience.

=== Steve Orth ===
- ,Portrayed by Kevin Patrick Walls
- Appeared in: Scream (1996)
- Status: Deceased

Steven "Steve" Orth is a Woodsboro teenager and the boyfriend of Casey Becker. He is captured and held hostage by Ghostface, who keeps him bound to a chair outside Casey's home. Casey is made to answer horror-film trivia questions to save his life. When she gets a question wrong, Steve is disemboweled and dies.

Walls auditioned for the part of Billy Loomis, but took the smaller role of Steve when Ulrich was cast as Billy.

=== Stu Macher ===
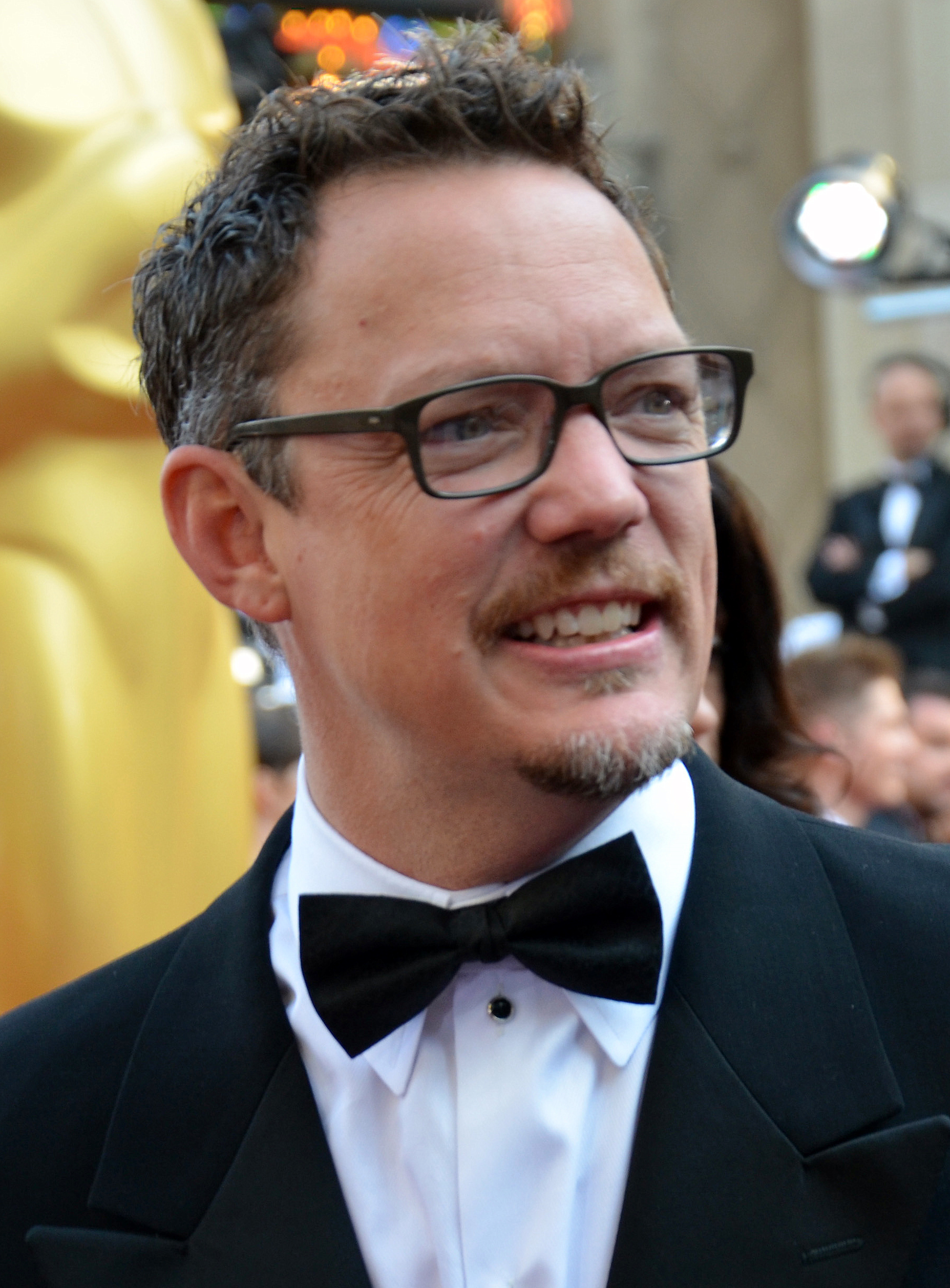

- Portrayed by Matthew Lillard
- Appeared in: Scream (1996), Scream VI (photo only), and Scream 7
- Status: Deceased

Stuart "Stu" Macher is a Woodsboro teenager, the ex-boyfriend of Casey Becker and boyfriend of Tatum Riley. Following a series of murders in the town, starting with the killing of Stu's ex-girlfriend Casey Becker, school is suspended. Stu hosts a party at his house to celebrate. At the party, Ghostface murders Tatum. Billy Loomis is revealed to be Ghostface, and Stu his accomplice. Stu cites peer pressure as his motivation and thought Billy's was for sadistic thrills and gratifications, not knowing his vendetta against the Prescotts. After Sidney turns the tables on them and foils their plan to frame Sidney's father for their killing spree, Stu becomes heartbroken that his parents will be "mad at him", before becoming enraged and trying to kill Sidney, but Sidney beats him and ultimately drops a television on the terrified Stu's head, electrocuting him. In Scream 3, it is revealed that, under Roman Bridger's advice, Billy had planned to set Stu up as the "fall guy" for their killing spree in case they got caught, while his getting an easy sentence for being an accomplice.

Matthew Lillard has an uncredited brief cameo at a sorority party in Scream 2. He revealed in a 2009 interview that Stu was originally intended to be the killer in Scream 3, having survived his apparent death. From prison he was to orchestrate new Ghostface attacks on high school students, ultimately targeting Sidney. Following the Columbine High School massacre, which took place shortly before production began, this plot was abandoned and the script was rewritten without Stu to avoid presenting violence and murder in a high school setting. Many of Lillard's notable and humorous lines in the film were improvised. He was cast by chance, after accompanying his girlfriend at the time to a separate audition in the facility where Scream auditions were also taking place. Scream casting director Lisa Beach saw Lillard and, believing he had the characteristics required of the character, asked him to audition. Lillard also subsequently made vocal cameos in Scream 3 and Scream (2022) as the voice of Ghostface respectively using a voice changer and in the film within a film Stab 8, and appearing again as a background partygoer in Scream (2022), participating in the "To Wes!" toast. Stu's photo can be seen on the investigation board in Scream VI, while his red robe worn at the end of the first film and the TV used to kill him can be seen in the Ghostface shrine. Kirby Reed ultimately uses the same TV to kill Ethan. In Scream 7, the killer uses a highly realistic deepfake version of Stu via AI manipulation to try to taunt and make Sidney believe that he is still alive, by making his appearance look older and have scars from the TV.

=== Tatum Riley ===
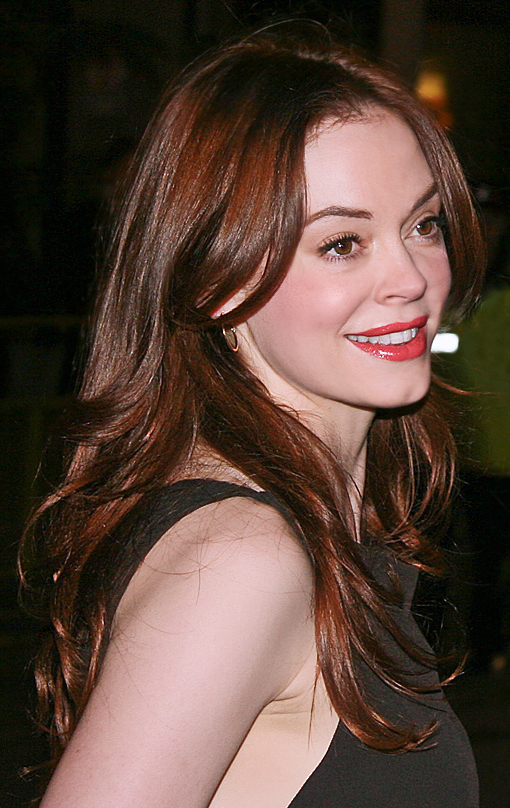
Tatum Riley was one of McGowan's earliest starring roles.

- Portrayed by Rose McGowan
- Appeared in: Scream (1996)
- Status: Deceased

Tatum Riley is a Woodsboro teenager, the best friend of Sidney Prescott, the girlfriend of Stu Macher and the sister of town Deputy Dewey Riley. After a series of murders begin in the town, Tatum attempts to protect Sidney from the ensuing media attention, since the killings occurred on the anniversary of the brutal murder of Sidney's mother. Tatum's boyfriend Stu hosts a house party, during which the killer strikes, attacking her in the garage. She tries to escape through a pet flap fitted to the automatic garage door, but becomes stuck, and the killer raises the door. Tatum's neck is crushed between the rising door and the top of its frame, killing her.

Twenty-five years after her death, her older brother Dewey is shown in possession of her ashes in his trailer. In Scream 7, it’s revealed that Sidney named her eldest daughter Tatum in honour of her deceased best friend.

Actresses Marley Shelton, Melinda Clarke and Rebecca Gayheart also auditioned for the role, however, McGowan was cast as Tatum because the production team felt she best embodied the "spunky" nature of the character. McGowan put herself in charge of Tatum's wardrobe, as she conceived her character less tomboyish and more cute and appealing than the costume designer Cynthia Bergstrom had devised. She even extended it to Tatum's bedroom by removing the posters of the Indigo Girls and replaced them with kitten posters. Additionally, in order to distinguish her character from Neve Campbell's, McGowan had to dye her hair blonde.

Tatum's death, like those of Casey Becker and Kenny Brown, caused conflict between director Wes Craven and the MPAA film rating board. Craven was ultimately forced to reduce any lingering shots of her body, necessitating a quick visual cutaway once she dies. While filming Tatum's death scene, McGowan discovered she actually could fit through the pet flap and as a result, she would fall out of it during filming. The producer had to staple her clothes to the flap to prevent her from falling out of it again.

== Introduced in Scream 2 ==
Scream 2 is the second film in the Scream series and is set two years after the original Woodsboro murder spree. Sidney Prescott and Randy Meeks now attend the fictional Windsor College as students. "Stab", a film based on the Woodsboro murders, has just been released, and a copycat murder spree begins during its premiere. The new Ghostface attacks Sidney and her friends, killing Randy and wounding Dewey Riley, before being revealed as Sidney's classmate Mickey Altieri and Nancy Loomis, the mother of Scream killer Billy Loomis.

=== Cici Cooper ===
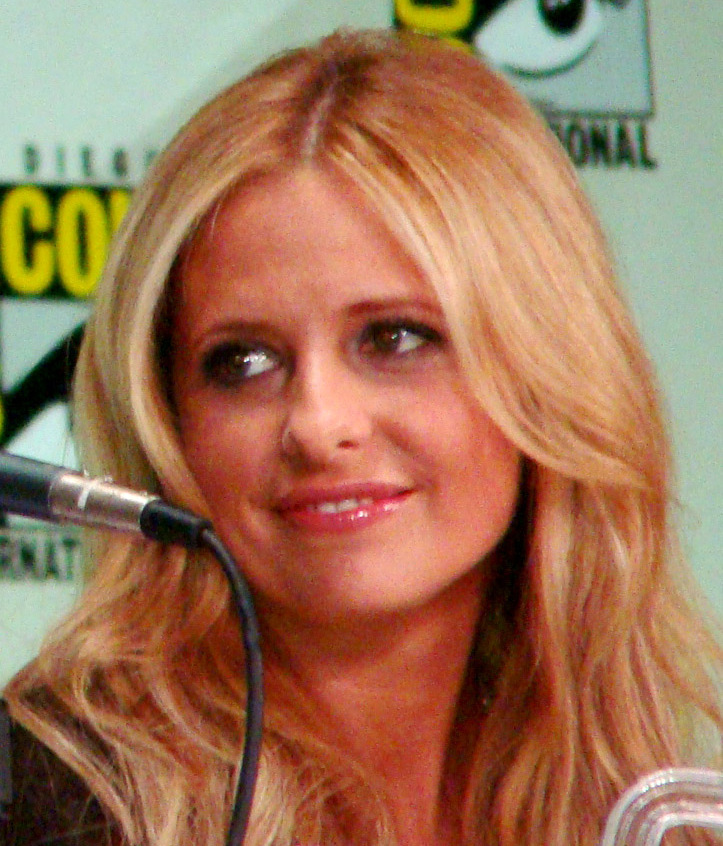

- Portrayed by Sarah Michelle Gellar
- Appeared in: Scream 2
- Status: Deceased

Casey "Cici" Cooper is a student at Windsor College. While alone in her house, Cici is attacked by Ghostface. She runs upstairs pursued by the killer, who throws her through a glass door on to a balcony and stabs her twice in the back before picking her up and throwing her over the balcony to her death. From her murder and the preceding murders of Phil Stevens and Maureen Evans, Gale Weathers and Dewey Riley deduce that the new killer is choosing targets with names similar to those of the victims of the original Ghostface killers, Billy Loomis and Stu Macher.

=== Nancy Loomis ===
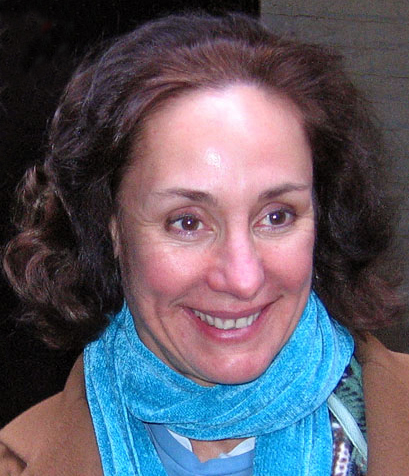
Metcalf had just finished her run in the hit sitcom Roseanne when she starred in Scream 2, continuing the trend started in Scream of casting popular and established actresses.

- Portrayed by Laurie Metcalf
- Appeared in: Scream 2, Scream VI (photo only), and Scream 7 (cameo)
- Status: Deceased

Debbie Salt is the pseudonym of Nancy Loomis, referred to simply as "Billy's mother" and "Mrs. Loomis" in the film. She is a local news reporter covering the series of murders at Windsor College who often clashed with Gale Weathers. In the finale, Salt is revealed to be Billy's mother, and the copycat Ghostface alongside her accomplice, Mickey. It is also revealed that Mrs. Loomis killed Randy Meeks because he criticized her son Billy on the phone. Before the events of Scream, she leaves her home after learning of her husband's affair with Sidney Prescott's mother Maureen, abandoning Billy and providing his motivation for his killing spree in Scream. After Billy's death, Mrs. Loomis undertakes a physical makeover, losing weight to change her appearance. She then recruits Mickey from a website devoted to serial killers, to enact a plan for revenge against Sidney. She ultimately betrays Mickey and shoots him, claiming to have indulged his desire for fame to gain his help, while she really intends to kill Sidney to avenge Billy's death, despite the fact that her son was a killer and that her own abandonment caused her son to become one, which Sidney points out. Cotton Weary intervenes during their confrontation, and Nancy attempts to manipulate him into letting her kill Sidney, but to her horror, she fails to do so and Cotton saves Sidney's life by shooting her in the throat. Sidney eventually kills Nancy by fatally shooting through the head, just like what she did to Billy.

In the original Scream 2 script, Nancy worked with Hallie and Derek, not Mickey, though she still killed her allies. She intended to frame Cotton for the murders, but he managed to stab and kill her. After the script leaked on to the Internet, it underwent rewrites that removed this ending.

In Scream VI, Mrs. Loomis' first name is revealed to have been "Nancy", listed on Kirby Reed's FBI list of previous killers with their photo and death year. In Scream 7, the killers create a highly realistic deepfake version of Nancy via AI manipulation in order to taunt Sidney.

=== Derek Feldman ===
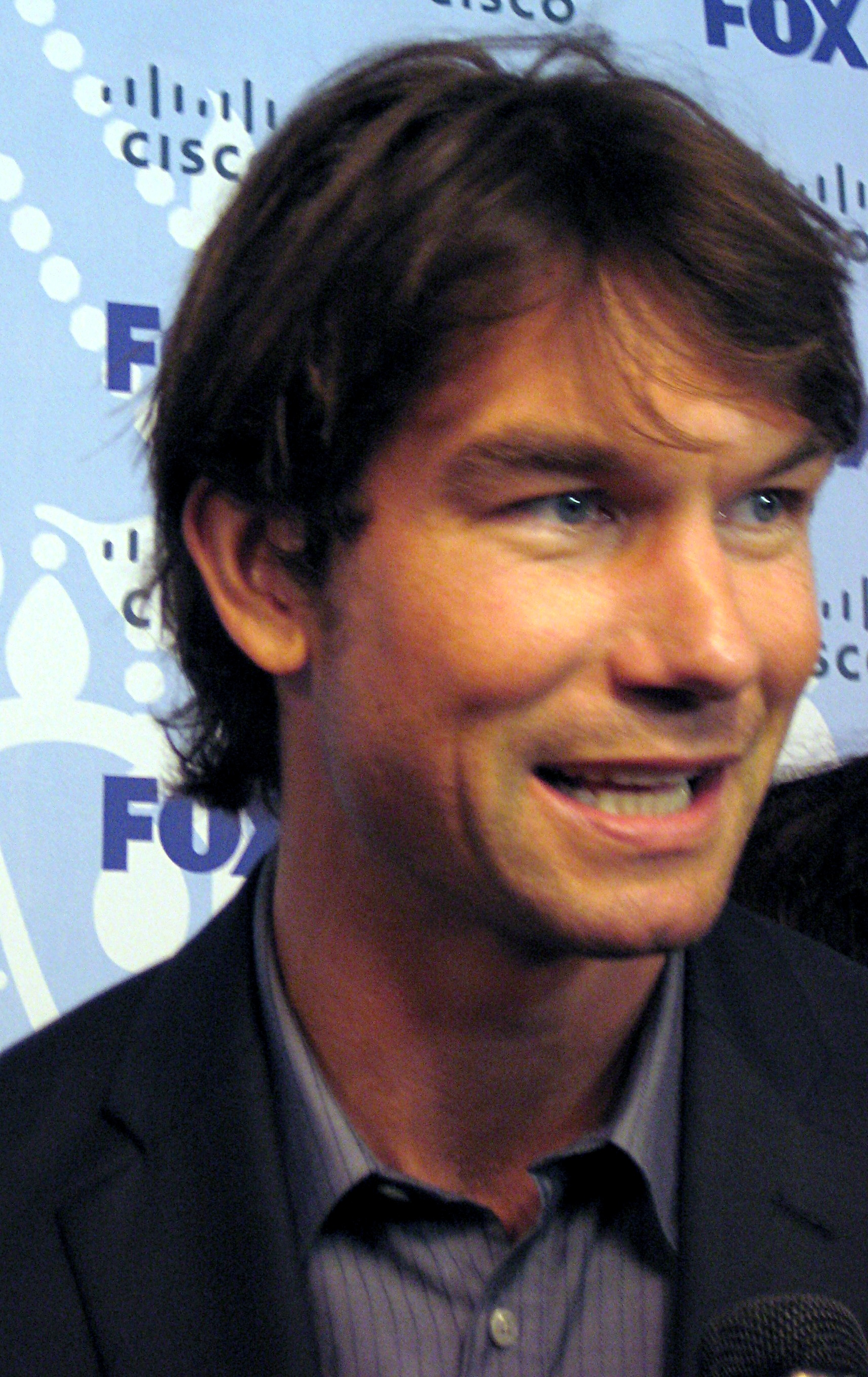

- Portrayed by Jerry O'Connell
- Appeared in: Scream 2
- Status: Deceased

Derek Feldman is a pre-med student at Windsor College, a friend of Mickey and boyfriend of Sidney Prescott. After publicly declaring his love for Sidney, he is captured by his fellow frat brothers and restrained as a prank. During the finale, as Sidney is escaping Ghostface, she finds Derek still restrained and tries to untie him before the killer arrives. Ghostface reveals himself as Mickey and accuses Derek of being his accomplice, causing Sidney to hesitate in freeing him. After Derek threatens Mickey, Mickey shoots him through the heart, killing him.

In the original Scream 2 screenplay, Derek was one of the killers working with Mrs. Loomis and Hallie McDaniel. He and Hallie, who were also secret lovers, shared the motivation of gaining fame for the murders when they were caught, but were both killed by Mrs. Loomis to preserve her anonymity. After the script was leaked on the Internet, it underwent rewrites, removing this ending.

=== Hallie McDaniel ===
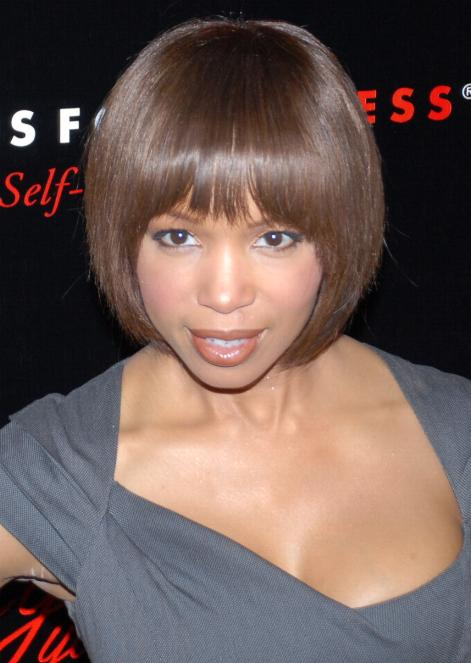

- Portrayed by Elise Neal
- Appeared in: Scream 2
- Status: Deceased

Hallie McDaniel is a psychology major at Windsor College and the roommate of Sidney Prescott. She is also sworn to the Delta Lambda Zeta sorority. When Sidney is taken into protective custody, Hallie accompanies her, but Ghostface attacks the car in which they are traveling and murders the policemen guarding them. Ghostface hijacks their car, but crashes, rendering himself unconscious and allowing Sidney and Hallie to escape. When Sidney returns to the vehicle to discover the killer's identity, she finds him missing from the car. Ghostface leaps out at Hallie as she waits nearby for Sidney, and stabs her to death.

In the original Scream 2 screenplay, Hallie was one of the killers, working with Mrs. Loomis and Derek Feldman. She and Derek, who were also secret lovers, shared the motivation of gaining fame for the murders when they were caught, but were both killed by Mrs. Loomis to preserve her anonymity. After the script was leaked on the Internet, it underwent rewrites, removing this ending.

=== Joel ===
- Portrayed by Duane Martin
- Appeared in: Scream 2
- Status: Alive

Joel is Gale Weathers' new cameraman, replacing Kenny Brown from Scream.

When the Windsor College murders begin, Joel becomes scared of Gale's need to follow the trail. After he reads her book "The Woodsboro Murders", he becomes even more reluctant, especially when he learns about the fate of Kenny and greatly dislikes it when anybody mentions his name in front of him. He goes to buy some doughnuts and coffee and is shocked to come back and find Randy Meeks murdered in his van, passing out once he sees the gruesome sight. Left without his van due to it being an official crime scene and finally being pushed to his limits following Randy's death, he leaves, giving Gale all of the news footage that they had filmed so far and telling her that she needed her "head examined". He finally returns to Gale to once again be her cameraman.

In the original Scream 2 screenplay, Joel had a larger role as a member of Sidney Prescott's group of friends. His corpse was found during the film's finale. After this script was leaked on the Internet, it underwent rewrites, changing the role of several characters and making Joel a cameraman. In Scream (2022) and Scream VI, he is implied to be the husband of Martha Meeks and the father of Mindy and Chad Meeks-Martin (but it was never confirmed).

=== Maureen Evans and Phil Stevens ===
- Portrayed by Jada Pinkett Smith and Omar Epps
- Appeared in: Scream 2
- Status: Both deceased

Maureen Evans and her boyfriend Phil Stevens are students at Windsor College. They attend a sneak preview of the film "Stab" in the cold open, during which Phil goes to the bathroom and hears strange whimpering from the next stall. He presses his ear against the divider to listen closer, but a blade is forced through the divider, stabbing Phil in the ear and killing him. The killer, wearing a Ghostface costume, returns to the screening and sits beside Maureen, before mortally stabbing her. The audience believe her to be part of a publicity stunt, until she falls dead in front of the cinema screen. Their deaths are satirized in Scary Movie.

=== Mickey Altieri ===
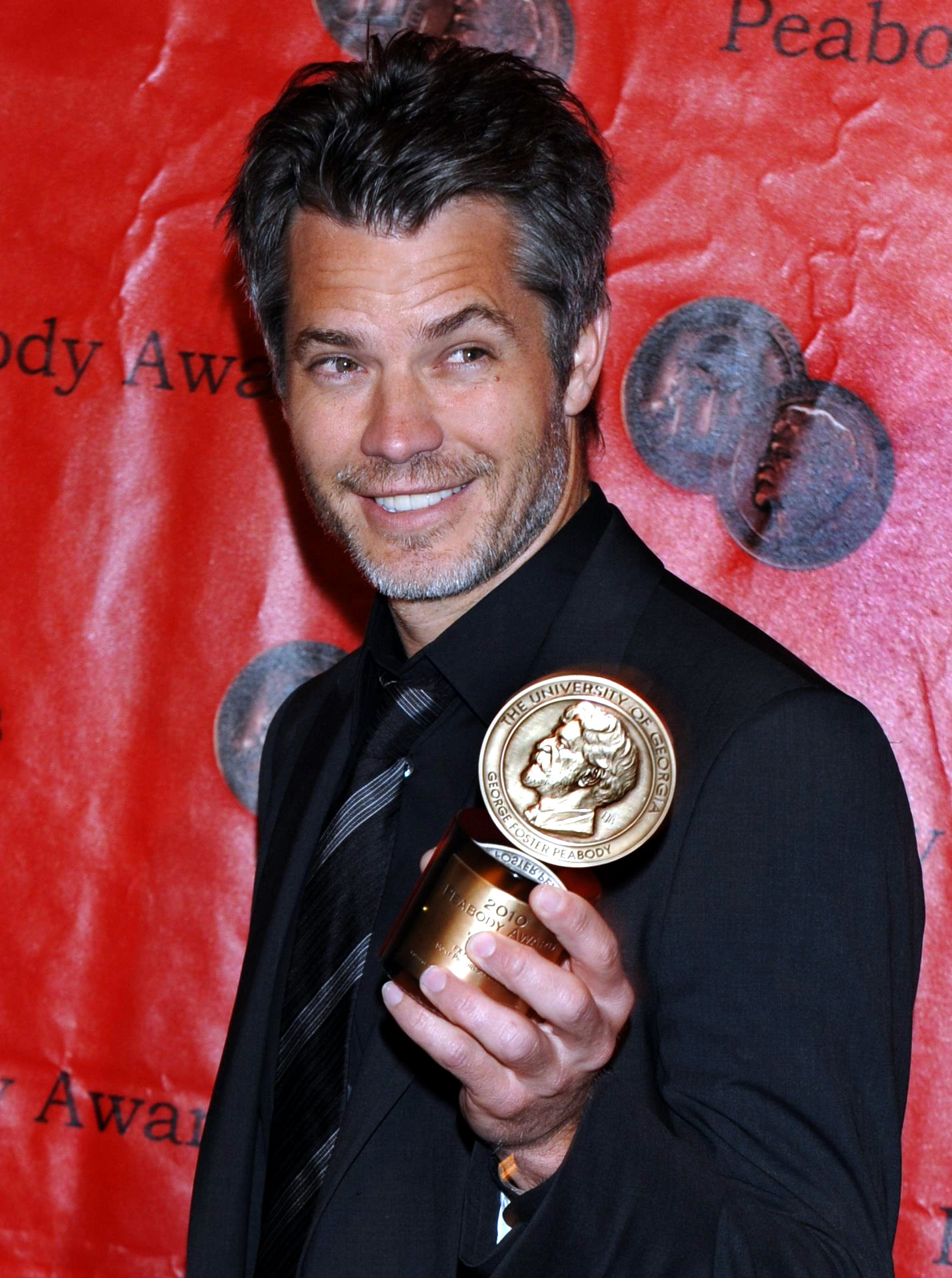
Olyphant in 2011.

- Portrayed by Timothy Olyphant
- Appeared in: Scream 2, and Scream VI (photo only)
- Status: Deceased

Mickey Altieri is a student at Windsor College and Derek's best friend. Like Randy Meeks from Scream, he shows an avid interest in horror films and sequels. In the finale he is revealed as the current Ghostface, with his accomplice Mrs. Loomis. He kills Sidney's boyfriend Derek in front of her. Mickey states that he carried out the killings with the intention of getting caught, believing he would receive fame for his deeds and from the resulting trial, and intending to blame film violence for influencing him. Contrary to Mickey's desires, however, Mrs. Loomis intends to disappear after the killings; so she shoots him, seemingly fatally. Before Mickey collapses, he fires his gun, wounding Gale and she falls offstage. After Mrs. Loomis' defeat, though, Mickey leaps to his feet screaming, but is finally killed by Gale and Sidney.

In the original Scream 2 script, Mickey was murdered by Ghostface while trying to save Sidney, but this was changed in rewrites after the original script was leaked online.

Scream VI sees a new Ghostface in NYC who attacks the remaining four survivors from the previous film. The new killer is leaving masks worn by past Ghostfaces. After an attack at Sam and Tara's apartment the killer leaves the mask used by Mickey and Mrs. Loomis. Later on a photo of Mickey and all the other past killers can be seen while Kirby Reed (now FBI) is investigating.

Mickey is the only Ghostface killer who was a serial killer prior to adopting the Ghostface moniker.

=== Stab Casey Becker ===
- Portrayed by Heather Graham
- Appeared in: Scream 2, Scream 4 (archive footage), and Scream (2022) (photo only)
- Status: Alive

Stab Casey Becker is the movie version of Casey Becker, portrayed by Drew Barrymore. She takes a shower while making popcorn. She also does not have a boyfriend, unlike her real-life counterpart. In the fourth film, Gale is attacked at Stab-A-Thon as the Woodsboro High teenagers watch the famed Stab opening scene, quoting her lines of dialogue. In the fifth film, Tara sees Heather Graham's image on her QuickSearch results when drilled with a movie trivia question by Ghostface. She identifies Heather Graham as the actress who portrays Casey (a fictionalised version of herself).

=== Film Class Guy #1 ===
- Portrayed by Joshua Jackson
- Appeared in: Scream 2
- Status: Alive

Joshua Jackson is a film student at Windsor College, in class with Randy Meeks, Mickey Altieri, and Cici Cooper. Credited as Film Class Guy #1, the character was retroactively established to be a fictionalised version of the actor Joshua Jackson in Scream (2022).

== Introduced in Scream 3 ==
In Scream 3, the third film in the Scream series, a new series of Ghostface murders begins during production of Stab 3, a film within a film based on the murders in Scream and Scream 2. Sidney Prescott has hidden herself away, and Ghostface leaves photographs of a young Maureen Prescott, her mother, at the crime scenes, hoping to lure her to Hollywood. The killer is revealed as Roman Bridger, Sidney's unknown half-brother and Maureen's son. Roman was conceived after the young Maureen was gang-raped in Hollywood while attempting to become an actress under the pseudonym Rina Reynolds. Baby Roman was given up for adoption, but as an adult he found Maureen, who rejected him. In revenge for this, Roman convinced Billy Loomis to kill her. Sidney and Roman fight, and Sidney stabs him before Dewey Riley shoots him through the head and kills him.

=== Angelina Tyler ===
- Portrayed by Emily Mortimer
- Appeared in: Scream 3
- Status: Deceased

Angelina Tyler is the actress who plays the role of Sidney Prescott in Stab 3, taking over for Tori Spelling who declined to reprise her role as Sidney. To win this role, she took part in a talent competition, but she later reveals that she had sex with John Milton, the producer of the Stab films, to secure the job. Throughout the film, she feigns a sweet and innocent ingenue persona which slowly starts to unravel in the third act. While attending the birthday party of Roman Bridger, she is attacked and killed by Ghostface.

In an early version of the script, Angelina was a second Ghostface, Roman's lover and accomplice, with the original draft elaborating that she was a former classmate of Sidney's from Woodsboro, whose real name was Angie Crick. Her motivation was stated as her idolizing Sidney and wanting her fame and attention, thus taking on the role of Sidney in the "Stab" film, and giving Roman's and Sidney's relationship incestuous vibes. The idea was later scrapped, Craven mentioning in the film's director's commentary that they couldn't get the studio on board with the idea. Editor Patrick Lussier and producer Marianne Maddalena left it ambiguous as to whether Angelina was actually dead due to being dragged off, discussing the idea in the film's commentary. They called her death scene "dubious". In a subsequent Scream Trilogy DVD boxset booklet, Angelina is not listed as a deceased character from Scream 3. This may have just been an oversight, but fans have speculated it is connected to all this other information about the plan to have her as a killer. Scream VI, however, lists Roman Bridger as the only Ghostface in the Hollywood killings, implying Angelina wasn't involved at all.

=== Christine Hamilton ===
- Portrayed by Kelly Rutherford
- Appeared in: Scream 3
- Status: Deceased

Christine Hamilton is Cotton Weary's girlfriend. In the cold open, she is stalked by the current Ghostface, who uses a voice synthesizer to sound like Cotton, convincing her that Cotton is behind the mask. When the real Cotton arrives, she believes him to be Ghostface and attacks him, while the real Ghostface approaches her from behind and stabs her to death.

=== Jennifer Jolie ===
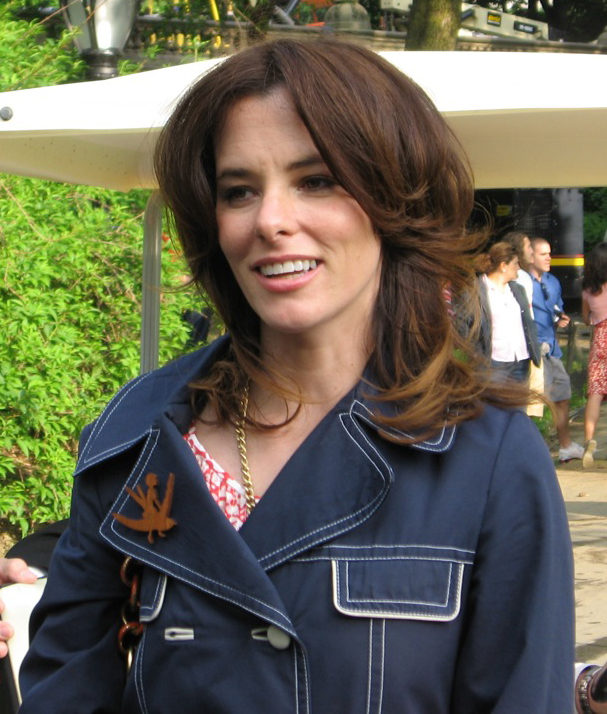
Critical reaction to Posey's performance as Jennifer Jolie was highly positive. The role earned her an MTV Movie Award nomination.

- Portrayed by Parker Posey
- Appeared in: Scream 3, and Scream (2022) (photo only)
- Status: Deceased

Jennifer Jolie (real name Judy Jurgenstern) is the actress playing the role of Gale Weathers in the first two Stab movies, and the cancelled Stab 3: Return to Woodsboro. After a new series of Ghostface murders, Jennifer believes she may be the next victim and starts following the real Gale, hoping the killer will choose to kill her instead. While attending a birthday party for Roman Bridger she is attacked and killed by Ghostface.

In the fifth film, Tara sees an image of Jennifer when she uses IMDB to find the cast of the original Stab. In the sixth film, a Jennifer Jolie Retrospective was shown to once be playing in New York City, as indicated by the marquee on the old theatre.

Parker Posey was nominated in 2000 for an MTV Movie Award for Best Comedic Performance for her role as Jennifer Jolie, losing to Adam Sandler, who won it for his performance in Big Daddy (1999).

=== John Milton ===
- Portrayed by Lance Henriksen
- Appeared in: Scream 3
- Status: Deceased

John Milton is the producer of the three fictional Stab movies. He is revealed to have known Maureen Prescott in her youth, when she was an aspiring actress using the pseudonym Rina Reynolds. It was during one of Milton's parties in the 1970s that Rina was gang-raped and became pregnant with Roman Bridger, with Milton himself being his unknowing father, making him (not Maureen) the overall catalyst of the Ghostface killing sprees and responsible for the ruination of the lives of Maureen's family, especially her children. Ghostface, revealed as Roman, kidnaps Milton and murders him in front of Sidney, blaming his father for his putrid existence as an offspring of rape and their mother's nymphomania, and as a part of his scheme to vilify Sidney before he kills her.

=== Mark Kincaid ===
- Portrayed by Patrick Dempsey
- Appeared in: Scream 3
- Status: Alive

Mark Kincaid is a detective investigating the most recent Ghostface murders. He displays an interest in horror films, and in the history of Sidney Prescott, later implied that he is infatuated with her. When Sidney is forced to confront the killer, Kincaid is concerned for her and secretly follows her. Kincaid is attacked and severely wounded by Ghostface. After Ghostface is killed, he is seen with Sidney, Dewey and Gale at Sidney's house, preparing to watch a movie.

=== Martha Meeks ===
- Portrayed by Heather Matarazzo
- Appeared in: Scream 3, and Scream (2022)
- Status: Alive

Martha Meeks is Randy Meeks' younger sister, four years his junior. After learning of the new Ghostface murders, she sneaks onto the Stab 3: Return to Woodsboro set to give her friend Dewey Riley a tape recorded by Randy prior to his death in Scream 2; it contains his advice for surviving the concluding chapter of a trilogy and the third series of Ghostface murders. She is surprised to find Sidney, now out of hiding, there alongside the former deputy.

In the DVD commentary, Marianne Maddalena stated that a line reference to Martha being in Hollywood for a game show was deleted, explaining how she bypassed security on the set.

In Scream (2022), Martha is the 39-year-old mother to fraternal twin children: Chad and Mindy Meeks-Martin. Both children are high school seniors, suggesting she became a mother at 21. She leaves snacks for the kids to discuss the new killings, and reunites with Dewey for the first time on-screen since the third film after telling him "Bye Dewey, come visit us soon". She appears speechless at his unkempt appearance, before Chad signals her to leave. Later, a text message sent by Chad reveals he texted Liv that he snuck out of his mother's house behind her back.

=== Roman Bridger ===
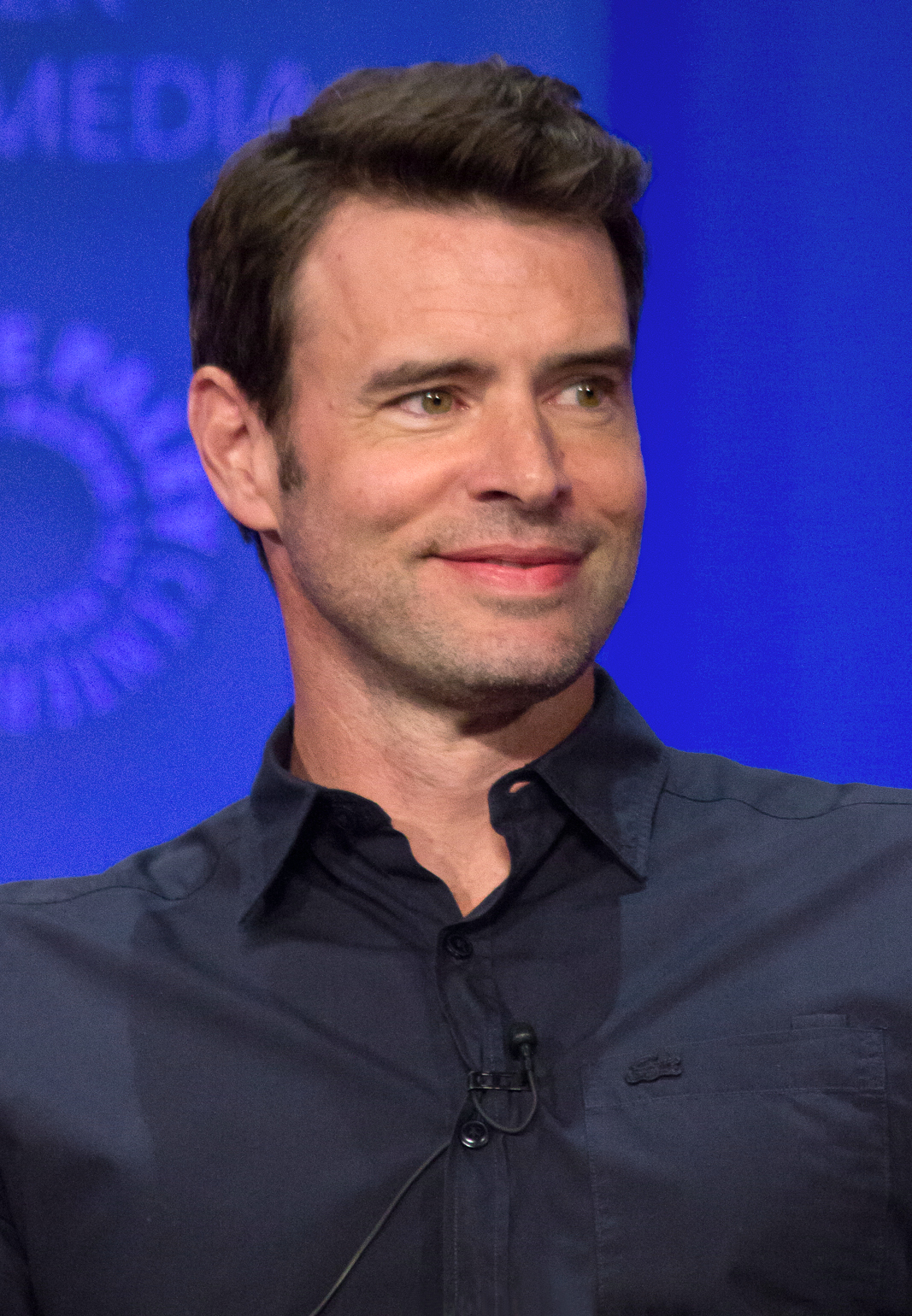

- Portrayed by Scott Foley
- Appeared in: Scream 3, Scream (2022) (footage), Scream VI (photo only) and Scream 7 (cameo)
- Status: Deceased

Roman Bridger is the director of Stab 3: Return to Woodsboro. During his birthday party at John Milton's mansion, he is found in the basement, apparently murdered. Later, when Sidney Prescott is confronted by Ghostface, the latter is unmasked as Roman, who has faked his death to eliminate himself as a suspect. Roman tells Sidney that he is her maternal half-brother, relating the circumstances of his conception by Milton (who is unaware that Roman is his son) and later rejection by Maureen Prescott. Having admitted to Sidney that he is their mother's third killer, Roman reveals that he masterminded Maureen's murder by allying with Billy Loomis, thus making him the overall architect of the Ghostface spree, which made Billy Loomis the fall guy of this crime. Harboring a grudge against Sidney and believing that she has the life and fame that he was denied because he was a child of rape, Roman now tries to kill her, and he engages in a vicious fight with Sidney after she denounces him for his motives, telling him that, contrary to what he thinks, it's Roman's own fault that he chose to kill people. In the end, Roman is ultimately outsmarted and beaten by Sidney, and is killed by Dewey Riley (sparing Sidney from committing fratricide), thus relieving him from the misery of his existence, and Sidney takes no pleasure from her half-brother's death.

In Scream VI, the new Ghostface is leaving behind masks from past killers. After Dr. Stone is murdered in his home, Ghostface leaves Bridger's mask used in the third film. While Detective Bailey and Kirby are investigating, they have all of the killers' photos on a board with when they died and which mask was left where. Roman's picture can be seen above "Death: 2000". In Scream 7, the killers create a highly realistic deepfake version of Roman via AI manipulation to taunt Sidney.

=== Sarah Darling ===
- Portrayed by Jenny McCarthy
- Appeared in: Scream 3
- Status: Deceased

Sarah Darling is an actress starring in Stab 3. She receives a phone call from someone claiming to be Roman Bridger (later revealed to actually be him), the director of that film, but after the call turns sinister she attempts to conceal herself among a set of film prop Ghostface costumes. However, one of the costumes is being worn by the killer, who attacks and murders Sarah, leaving a picture of the young Maureen Prescott on her corpse.

=== Steven Stone ===
- Portrayed by Patrick Warburton
- Appeared in: Scream 3
- Status: Deceased

Steven Stone is Jennifer Jolie's bodyguard. While guarding her home, he inspects Dewey Riley's trailer, which is kept on her land. While there he receives a phone call from someone claiming to be Dewey, who is later revealed to be Ghostface using a voice synthesizer to imitate Dewey's voice. Stone is attacked and killed by Ghostface.

=== Tom Prinze ===
- Portrayed by Matt Keeslar
- Appeared in: Scream 3
- Status: Deceased

Tom Prinze is an actor in Stab 3, playing the role of Dewey Riley. At night in Jennifer Jolie's house, Tom, Jennifer, Dewey and Gale Weathers are attacked by Ghostface. The killer begins faxing them pages of script detailing the immediate events. As there is a power cut in the house, Tom attempts to illuminate the pages with his lighter, unaware of gas leaking into the house, causing an explosion that kills him.

=== Tyson Fox ===
- Portrayed by Deon Richmond
- Appeared in: Scream 3
- Status: Deceased

Tyson Fox is an actor in Stab 3, playing the role of Ricky, the Stab 3 equivalent of Randy Meeks, following backlash of his death in Stab 2. While attending the birthday party of Roman Bridger, he is attacked, stabbed, and thrown over a balcony to his death.

== Introduced in Scream 4 ==
Scream 4 is the fourth film in the Scream series. On the fifteenth anniversary of the Woodsboro massacre depicted in Scream, Sidney Prescott returns to the town to promote her new self-help book, "Out of Darkness", about her overcoming the attacks and the deaths in her life. The fictional "Stab" series of horror films based on her life have continued to be produced and have become increasingly popular. In Scream 4, Woodsboro is attacked by a new Ghostface, who recreates the original Woodsboro killings from Scream. Ghostface targets Sidney, her cousin Jill Roberts, and Jill's friends. As the killings occur, Gale Weathers-Riley struggles to reestablish her journalistic career, while working on her strained marriage to Dewey Riley, now promoted to Sheriff.

=== Anthony Perkins ===
- Portrayed by Anthony Anderson
- Appeared in: Scream 4
- Status: Deceased

Deputy Anthony Perkins (credited simply as "Deputy Perkins") is a member of the Woodsboro police, who is assigned to guard Jill Roberts, Kirby Reed and Sidney Prescott after threats from Ghostface. While patrolling the grounds of Jill's home, he and his partner are attacked and stabbed to death by Ghostface. Perkins pulls a prank on Hoss, before Hoss is stabbed from behind, then Perkins is stabbed in the head. Hoss refers to him as "Anthony" when he plays dead, a nod to actor Anthony Perkins, who portrayed Norman Bates in Psycho (1960).

Shortly before he drops to his death, he is still living, despite being impaled in the skull with a knife; this was based on a real-life story that Wes Craven heard about, from a man who took himself to the E.R after being stabbed in the head.

Anderson replaces Rutina Wesley who was intended to portray Marcie Perkins until budget cuts prevented it.

=== Ross Hoss ===
- Portrayed by Adam Brody
- Appeared in: Scream 4
- Status: Deceased

Deputy Ross Hoss is a "rookie" member of the Woodsboro police, who is assigned to guard Jill Roberts, Kirby Reed and Sidney Prescott after threats from Ghostface. While patrolling the grounds of Jill's home, he and his partner are attacked and stabbed to death by Ghostface, after his partner Perkins pulls a prank on him. His wife is pregnant with his child at the time of his death.

=== Charlie Walker ===
- Portrayed by Rory Culkin
- Appeared in: Scream 4, and Scream VI (photo only)
- Status: Deceased

Charles "Charlie" Walker is a student at Woodsboro High School, friend of Robbie Mercer, love interest of Kirby Reed and an avid fan of horror films, particularly the "Stab" series. He runs a film club with Robbie, and the pair are recruited by Gale Weathers-Riley to help profile the killer. He hosts a large-scale viewing of the seven "Stab" films in a remote area, and later attends an after-party at Kirby's house. Ghostface attacks the party and Charlie is captured and bound to a chair. Kirby is forced to answer horror film trivia questions to save his life. Believing she has won, Kirby frees Charlie, but he stabs her in the stomach and confesses to being the killer, angry with her for not returning his affections in the years they had known each other, before leaving her for dead. Charlie is revealed to have an accomplice, Jill Roberts, with whom he is in a romantic relationship. Charlie admits to aiding Jill in order to become the new generation Randy Meeks to her Sidney Prescott. Jill instead betrays him and stabs him through the heart, killing him.

11 years later, Kirby is an FBI agent and visits New York where the latest Ghostface has struck. She shows her wounds Charlie gave her from her attack and later can be seen observing the knife used on her in the Stab shrine. Also a photo of Charlie and all other killers can be seen while Kirby is investigating with Detective Bailey.

=== Jenny Randall ===
- Portrayed by Aimee Teegarden
- Appeared in: Scream 4
- Status: Deceased

Jenny Randall is a student at Woodsboro High. In the cold open, after watching Stab 7, Jenny pranks Marnie by pretending to be Ghostface. However, Marnie is then attacked and killed by the real Ghostface. Ghostface calls Jenny, taunting her, and Jenny assumes it is Trevor, Jill's ex-boyfriend, suggesting a connection between the two. The killer then chases Jenny through the house, wounding her and crushing her back as she tries to crawl under an automatic garage door, before stabbing her to death.

The next day, Jill gets a call from Jenny's phone in front of Olivia and Kirby, using the Ghostface voice. At Sidney's book signing, the knife used to kill her makes Sidney a material witness to the crime, as Jenny and Marnie's phones are found in Sidney's rental. The film highlights Trevor's infidelity and a small suggestion is Trevor may have cheated on Jill with Jenny. When Jill is revealed as the killer, she expresses rage over Trevor cheating on her.

The PPV version of the film released to streaming in some countries re-dubs some of Olivia's lines, calling Jenny "the other woman" in the car on the way to school, making her murder much more obvious in how personal it may have been.

Wes Craven expressed disappointment in the removal of Jenny and Marnie's crime scene aftermath/autopsy scene, which was to occur sometime after the title card appeared. In the scene, the Woodsboro remake theme became apparent. The scene features Sheriff Dewey Riley (David Arquette), Deputy Sheriff Judy Hicks (Marley Shelton), the other cops and Craven himself in a coroner cameo, discussing leads, bodily fluid samples, the murder weapon, and explanations for why the girls were home alone. Jenny is tied to a chair like Steven Orth, while Marnie's corpse is hung to the ceiling fan like Casey Becker (Drew Barrymore) is hung from the tree in the original opening scene.

The deletion was administered by Bob Weinstein for pacing reasons. While Craven was susceptible to other deleted scenes, he felt the removal of this scene made the remake theme less apparent. Craven further stated, "For whatever reason he felt it wasn't important or necessary. We argued a long time for it. Our working relationship is give and take. He technically has final cut."

=== Marnie Cooper ===
- Portrayed by Britt Robertson
- Appeared in: Scream 4
- Status: Deceased

Marnie Cooper is the shyer, more reserved best friend of Jenny. She is a student at Woodsboro High, who is critical of Stab 6 and Stab 7 due to the movie-within-a-movie format seeming illogical. She is the audience surrogate in order for viewers to be explained by Jenny what the fake-out openings meant. When Jenny claims to hear a noise, Marnie immediately suspects she is about to prank her, a regular occurrence. When she comes upstairs, Jenny calls Marnie in the Ghostface voice through an app, and scares her, before she reveals it is her speaking through an app. However, Marnie croaks, and the phone shuts off, indicating something has happened to her.

Jenny investigates. Her window is smashed open, and Marnie's corpse falls through, and Jenny is killed moments later. The next day, unbeknown that she has died, Olivia Morris refers to her as "Marnie the Carnie" when she tells Jill that she got a call from her earlier in the morning using the Ghostface voice, indicating animosity between the two. At Sidney's book signing, the knife used to kill her makes Sidney a material witness to the crime, as Jenny and Marnie's phones are found in Sidney's rental. The climax reveals Charlie killed her, and shows footage of Marnie's stabbing to Sidney. The stabbing scene is the first time a character's death is shown, after they are murdered. The scene is from the original shot opening where Marnie is the primary target in the attack, not Jenny, after Jenny is stabbed on the couch and Marnie assumes it is a prank. The scene was available for viewing on the DVD for Scream 4.

A crime scene aftermath scene was shot and famously photographed as a promotional image for the film in 2010. It depicts Marnie hung from a ceiling fan at the Randall household, where the cops photograph the crime scene. Dewey asks them to take Marnie's corpse down. Later, Judy Hicks provides an explanation for why they are home-alone, with Marnie's parents assuming Jenny's parents were at home, while they were away. Against director Wes Craven's wishes, Bob Weinstein who had greater creative power, deleted the scene in the editing room, which was critical to highlight the remake theme. Craven expressed disappointment with this decision, arguing with Weinstein about it. He stated that the remake "was a huge theme" that was sadly "minimized throughout the editing process".

=== Jill Roberts ===
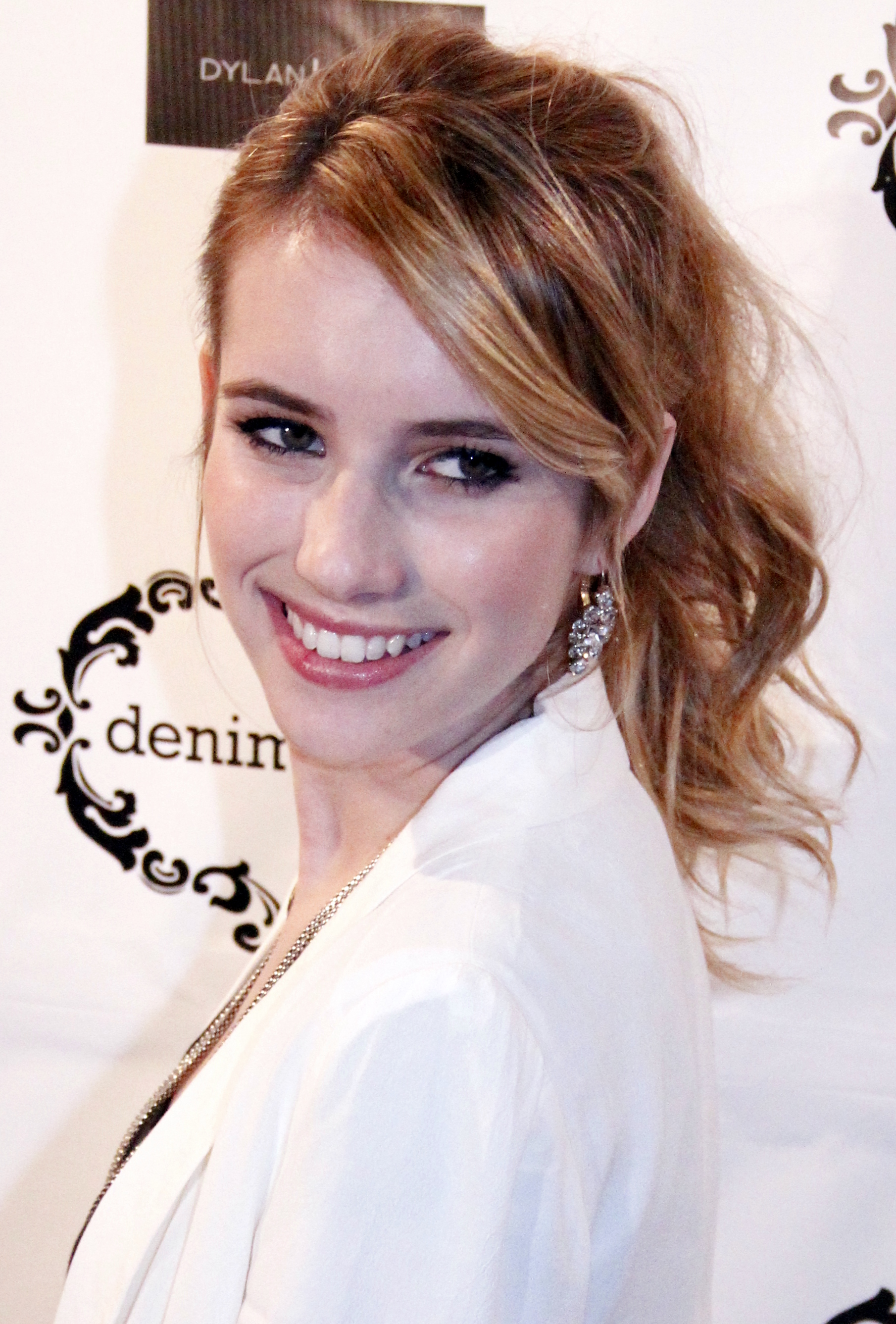
Roberts was required to dye her natural blonde hair dark and wear extensions to portray Sidney's cousin Jill in the fourth movie.

- Portrayed by Emma Roberts
- Appeared in: Scream 4, and Scream VI (photo only)
- Status: Deceased

Jill Roberts is a student at Woodsboro High School, cousin of Sidney Prescott and Roman Bridger, the daughter of Kate Roberts, and the niece of Maureen and Neil Prescott. Before the events of the film, she ends her relationship with her boyfriend Trevor Sheldon after he cheats on her. She and her friends, Kirby Reed and Olivia Morris, are targeted by the new Ghostface, resulting in their gaining police protection. Jill sneaks away from the protection to Kirby's house for a party. Ghostface attacks the party, murdering some of the attendees before being revealed as Charlie Walker. Following this reveal, Jill reveals herself as the other Ghostface and the mastermind behind the murders, as she and Charlie capture Sidney.

Envious of Sidney's fame and tired of living in her shadow, Jill wants to become the new "Sidney Prescott" by recreating the events that made Sidney famous. Jill murders Trevor for cheating on her, betrays Charlie by stabbing him through the heart, mainly because she didn't want to share the spotlight, and stabs Sidney in the stomach. Believing that the witnesses to her crimes are all dead, Jill plants evidence framing Trevor and Charlie for the murder spree. Jill then intentionally harms herself to appear to be the lone survivor of the Ghostface attacks. After being taken to the hospital, Jill discovers that Sidney has survived her wounds, ruining her plan. An enraged Jill again attempts to kill Sidney, but Sidney, aided by Dewey Riley, Gale Weathers-Riley and Judy Hicks, ultimately beat her and eventually kills Jill by shooting her in the chest, while her plan to become the new "Sidney Prescott" also collapses.

Jill's photo can be seen on an investigation board as Kirby (now FBI) and Detective Bailey investigate the new Ghostface killer (Scream VI). The new killer also leaves behind old masks used in past killings and the one used by Jill and Charlie gets left after Sam and Tara are attacked at a bodega. Jill's outfit she wore while at Kirby's in the final act can also be seen in the Ghostface shrine.

Ashley Greene was considered for the role of Jill before Emma Roberts was cast.

=== Judy Hicks ===
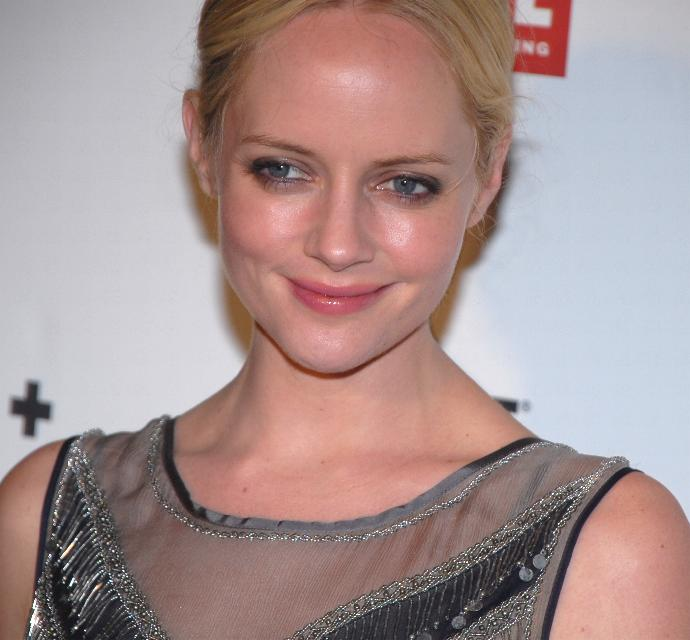
Shelton stars in the fourth and fifth films.

- Portrayed by Marley Shelton
- Appeared in: Scream 4, and Scream (2022)
- Status: Deceased

Judy Hicks is Deputy Sheriff of Woodsboro under Sheriff Dewey Riley and a former classmate of Sidney Prescott. She idolizes Dewey but dislikes his wife Gale Weathers-Riley. The two are able to put aside their differences in the end, when Judy saves Gale from being shot by Jill Roberts. She is then shot herself, but is unharmed, as she is wearing a bulletproof vest.

In the fifth entry, Judy is promoted to Sheriff. Her son, Wes Hicks, is introduced (a name tribute to series veteran director Wes Craven who died in 2015), portrayed by Dylan Minnette. She is subsequently murdered along with Wes at her home.

A deleted scene for Scream (2022) reunited Woodsboro cops, Dewey and Judy in person, but it was cut to give Arquette's character a better introduction and for the audience to spend more time with the newer characters.

Lake Bell was given the role of Judy, but she dropped out only four days before filming was to begin, citing scheduling conflicts. Hicks is Shelton's first role she has been asked to reprise, and she is also the first sequel performer to star in another sequel.

=== Kate Roberts ===
- Portrayed by Mary McDonnell
- Appeared in: Scream 4
- Status: Deceased

Kate Roberts is the mother of Jill Roberts, aunt to Sidney Prescott, sister to Maureen Prescott, and the sister-in-law of Neil Prescott. After Kate and Sidney are attacked by Ghostface, Kate, leaning against a door, is stabbed in the back through a mail slot and dies.

Lauren Graham was originally cast in the role of Kate Roberts but left the production a few days into principal photography, being replaced with McDonnell.

=== Kirby Reed ===
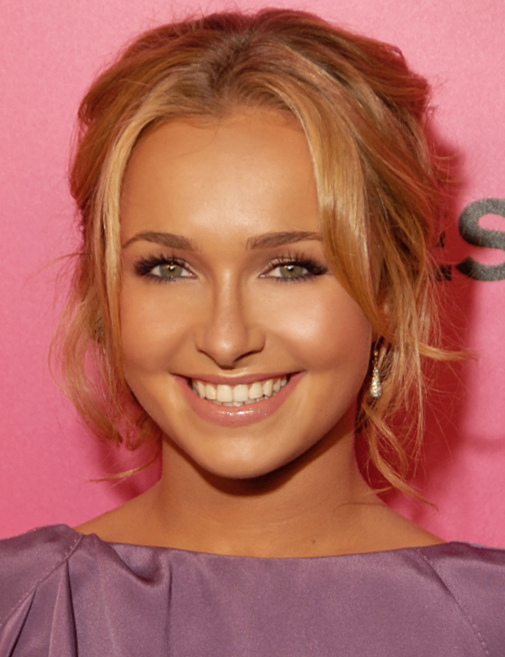
Panettiere received a positive critical response to her role as Kirby Reed.

- Portrayed by Hayden Panettiere
- Appeared in: Scream 4, Scream (2022) (uncredited; photograph only), and Scream VI
- Status: Alive

Kirby Reed is a Woodsboro teenager, friend of Jill Roberts and Olivia Morris, love interest of Charlie Walker and an avid fan of horror films. While entertaining friends at a party, she begins to pursue Charlie romantically. Ghostface attacks the party and she retreats into the basement with Sidney. Ghostface captures Charlie and forces Kirby to play a game to save his life. When she believes she has won, she unties Charlie, who then stabs her in the stomach and reveals that he is the killer, blaming her because she had not returned his affections sooner. After Scream 4, she became a fan favorite and a frequent topic of debate as to whether or not she survived her stabbings.

In Scream (2022), a visual clue reveals that Kirby survived her injuries and participated in an interview about the attacks, making her the sole teenage survivor of the 2011 killing spree, although her whereabouts are unknown. In May 2022, Panettiere officially signed on to be a cast member in the upcoming 2023 film Scream VI, indicating Kirby's return.

In Scream VI, Kirby returns as an FBI agent investigating the latest Ghostface killings in New York City. She is revealed to have known Sam when they were both in high school, Sam having been a freshman when Kirby was a senior.

=== Olivia Morris ===
- Portrayed by Marielle Jaffe
- Appeared in: Scream 4
- Status: Deceased

Olivia Morris is a Woodsboro teenager and a friend of Jill Roberts and Kirby Reed. Following a new series of Ghostface murders, she is attacked by Ghostface in her home and disemboweled while her friends are forced to watch from the neighboring house.

=== Rebecca Walters ===
- Portrayed by Alison Brie
- Appeared in: Scream 4
- Status: Deceased

Rebecca Walters is Sidney Prescott's secretary and publicist, who helps arrange Sidney's visit to Woodsboro to promote her book. Sidney fires her after Rebecca attempts to capitalize on the new Ghostface murders to increase sales of Sidney's book. While returning to her car, Rebecca is taunted and attacked by Ghostface. She is stabbed to death and her body is thrown from the top of a parking garage, landing on a news van in front of a crowd of reporters.

=== Robbie Mercer ===
- Portrayed by Erik Knudsen
- Appeared in: Scream 4
- Status: Deceased

Robert "Robbie" Mercer is a Woodsboro teenager, a friend of Charlie Walker and an avid fan of horror films, running a film club with Charlie. While attending Kirby Reed's party, he is attacked by Ghostface and fatally wounded, living long enough to warn Sidney Prescott, Jill and Kirby before dying.

=== Trevor Sheldon ===
- Portrayed by Nico Tortorella
- Appeared in: Scream 4
- Status: Deceased

Trevor Sheldon is a Woodsboro teenager and the ex-boyfriend of Jill Roberts, who ended her relationship with him after he took her virginity and then cheated on her with Jenny Randall. He makes repeated attempts to earn her forgiveness and continue their relationship. After Ghostface's victims receive calls from Trevor's cellphone, which he claims to have lost, he becomes a suspect in the murders. He attends Kirby Reed's house party, claiming to have been invited by phone, but the guests deny responsibility. When the true Ghostface killers are unmasked as Charlie Walker and Jill, they reveal a bound Trevor, whom they plan to frame for their crimes. Jill shoots him in the crotch for cheating on her, before executing him by shooting him in the head.

Tortorella auditioned five times to secure the role of Trevor by reenacting a scene from Scream where the character of Billy Loomis reveals he is one of the killers.

== Introduced in Scream (2022) ==
=== Samantha Carpenter ===
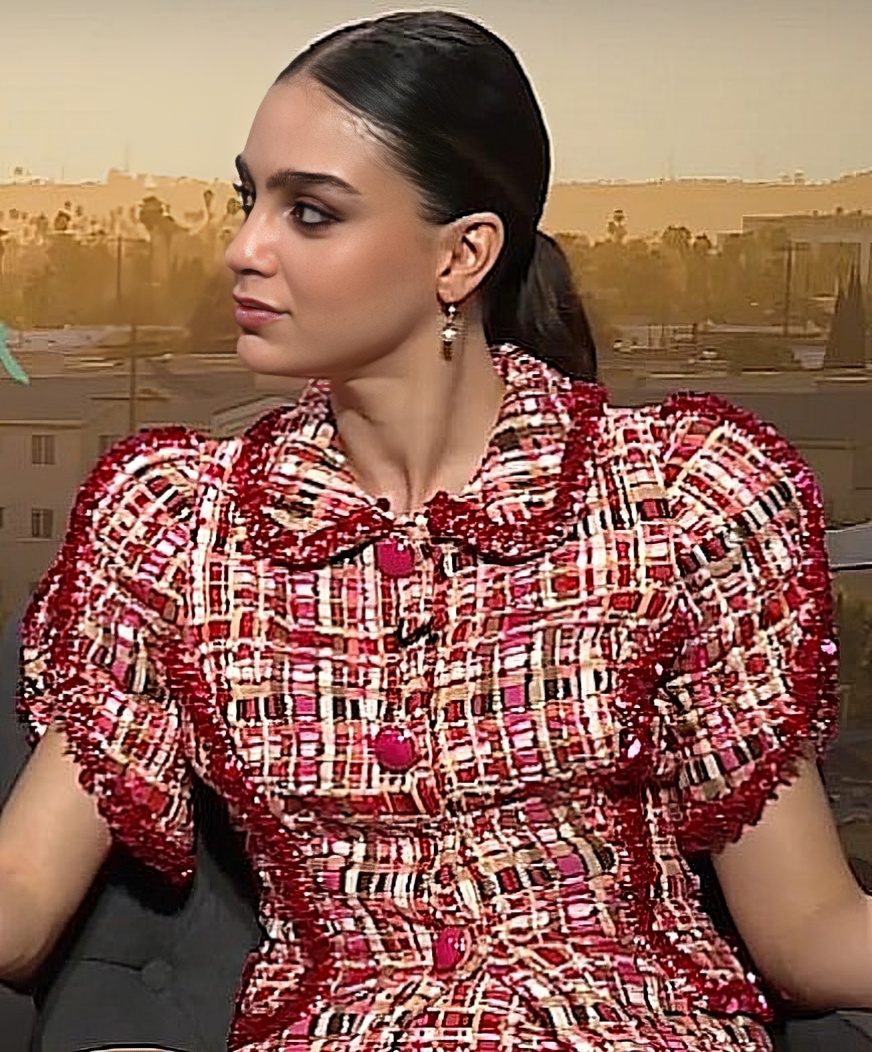
Barrera was praised by critics for her portrayal of Sam Carpenter and was nominated at the Golden Scythe Horror Awards for Best Actress

- Portrayed by Melissa Barrera
- Appeared in: Scream (2022), and Scream VI
- Status: Alive

Samantha "Sam" Carpenter is a young woman from Woodsboro who now lives in Modesto, California with her boyfriend, Richie Kirsch. She is the older half-sister of Tara Carpenter, and former babysitter of Wes Hicks. After discovering her real father is Billy Loomis when she was thirteen, Sam had a troubled adolescence before leaving her family and Woodsboro at eighteen, fearing that she would become a psychotic killer since. Upon receiving a call from Wes about Tara's attack, Sam returns to Woodsboro after five years with Richie to be with Tara as she recovers. At the hospital, she is attacked by Ghostface and begins experiencing hallucinations of her father. She eventually tells Tara her secret, which creates tension between the two. After rescuing Tara from a second attack, Sam decides to leave for Modesto again with both Richie and Tara. When Tara realizes she is missing her inhaler, the trio stops at Amber's house to retrieve a spare. There, Richie stabs her, revealing himself to be one of the killers alongside Amber and Tara's attacker. He tries to kill Sam but she overpowers him and kills him by slitting his throat. She then thanks Sidney and Gale before leaving for the hospital with Tara.

The sixth movie reveals that Sam and Tara are no longer in contact with their mother, after Sam was disowned for revealing the truth about her parentage to Tara, and Tara subsequently disowned their mother as a result. Sam also followed Tara to New York City out of fear for her safety, and the two move in with Quinn Bailey while Sam takes up a number of jobs to support them financially. She is also publicly ostracized following a string of conspiracy theories framing her for the Woodsboro murders, attends therapy frequently with Dr. Stone, and enters a secret relationship with her neighbor Danny Brackett. When Ghostface returns and murders a pair of students, Sam's driver's license was found at the scene, but her appointment with her therapist gives her an unbeatable alibi. She is asked to come with Tara to the police station, but the two are attacked by Ghostface in a bodega. They team up with FBI agent Kirby Reed (a former survivor of Ghostface herself) and are taken to an abandoned theater, transformed into a shrine for Ghostface killers. After Gale is attacked by Ghostface, Sam, Tara, Kirby and Chad decide to use the shrine to lure Ghostface into a trap. While there, Sam begins to reexperience hallucinations of Billy Loomis, who warns her to not trust anybody. Unfortunately, the group is locked inside, and Kirby and Chad are attacked by the Ghostfaces, who reveal themselves to be Wayne Bailey and his children, Ethan Landry and Quinn, who faked her death earlier and was the one who started the conspiracy theories to ruin Sam's image. They reveal themselves to be Richie's surviving family and intend to frame Sam and Tara for the murders. After they start fighting, Sam and Tara are able to gain the upper hand as they kill Quinn and subdue Ethan respectively. Sam uses the voice changer to mock Wayne before ambushing him in a Ghostface costume and finally kills him. After Kirby kills Ethan, they all receive medical treatment and Kirby advises Sam to call her anytime, as Sam agrees to let Tara live independently and stares at her father's mask before discarding it on the street and leaving the scene with Tara.

=== Tara Carpenter ===
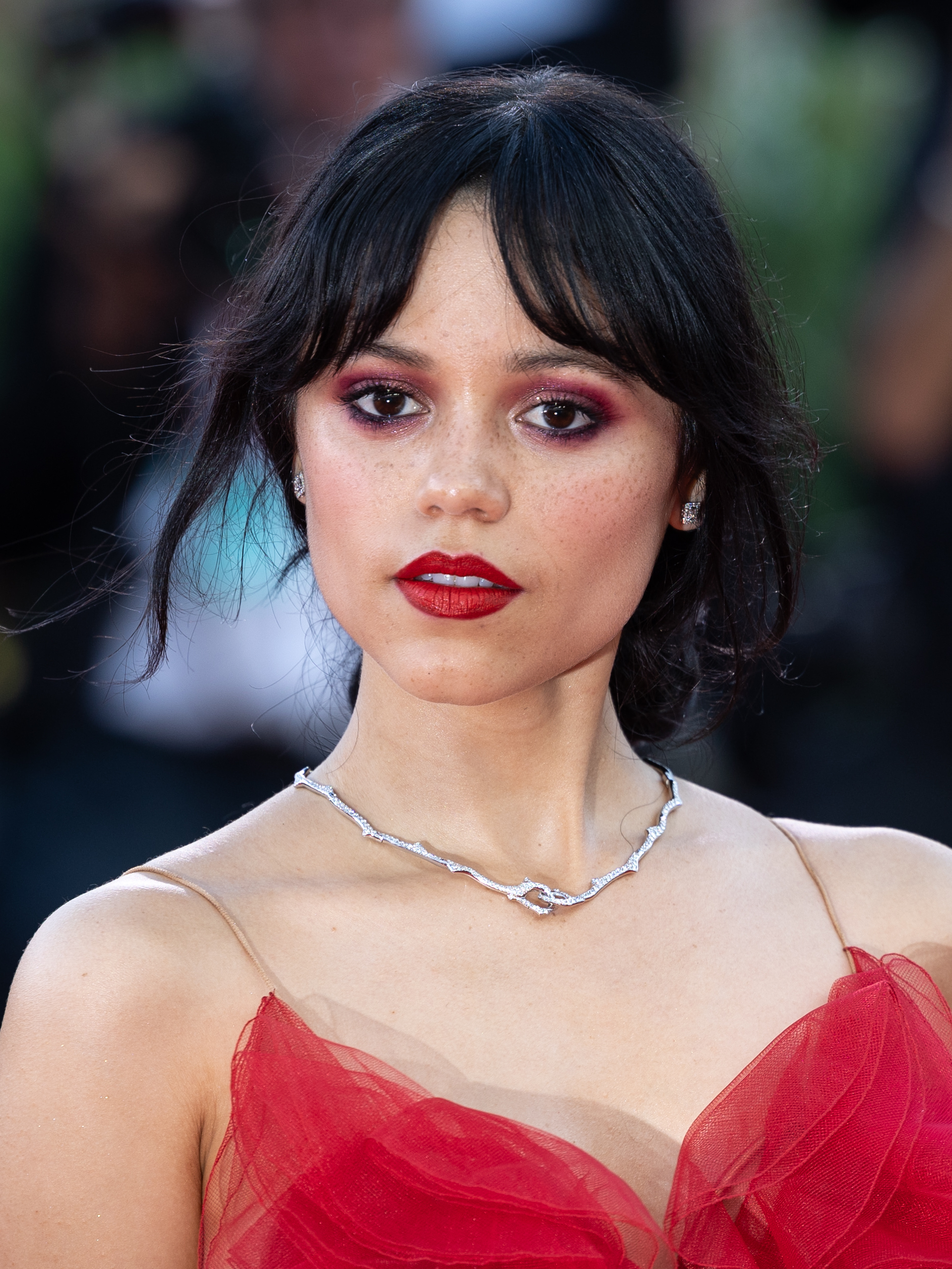

- Portrayed by Jenna Ortega
- Appeared in: Scream (2022), and Scream VI
- Status: Alive

Tara Carpenter is a Woodsboro teenager and the younger half-sister of Sam Carpenter. Her friend group includes Amber Freeman, Wes Hicks and Chad and Mindy Meeks-Martin. She is the first target of the new Ghostface, though she survives the cold open. She prefers elevated horror rather than typical slashers, citing the films Hereditary and The Babadook as some of her favorites. Tara is initially excited to see her sister after five years, but grows distant when Sam reveals her biological father is Billy Loomis. After she is attacked again at the hospital, Sam decides to bring Tara back to Modesto with her and Richie. As they leave Woodsboro, Tara realizes she is missing her inhaler, but remembers she left a spare at Amber's house. Upon arriving, Amber ends the memorial party in honor of Wes Hicks and goes with Tara to retrieve the inhaler. After revealing herself to be the killer, Amber ties up Tara in her closet. She is eventually found by Sam, who unties her. After fatally shooting a still-alive, badly burnt Amber, who was rushing at Sidney, Sam and Gale to stab them, Tara is loaded into an ambulance. Requesting that Sam ride with her, the two leave the scene.

Following the events of the fifth installment, Tara enrolls at Blackmore University and moves to New York City with Sam, who helicopters her much to Tara's annoyance. She is also revealed to have cut off her mother in support of Sam after she was cut off for revealing the truth about her paternity to Tara. Following a party that resulted in Sam tasing a student in the testicles for attempting to take advantage of Tara, Tara lashes out at Sam and pleads for her independence. Shortly after, she is taken care of by Chad, and the two almost kiss before being interrupted by Tara's roommate Quinn. When Sam and Tara head to the police station for some questioning about Ghostface's return, the two are attacked by the masked killer and escape into a bodega. Kirby Reed, a former Ghostface survivor and an FBI agent, arrives and agrees to help them stop Ghostface. Following another attack at their apartment that results in Quinn having her throat slit, the group uses an abandoned theater to lure Ghostface into a trap and stop him. While waiting, Chad kisses Tara, who reciprocates, though the two are attacked by Ghostface afterwards. Tara is able to escape, but witnesses Chad being stabbed repeatedly, devastating her. Sam and Tara are confronted by Wayne Bailey, Ethan Landry and a still-alive Quinn, who reveal themselves as the Ghostfaces. The two sisters are attacked but are soon able to gain the upper hand, which results in Tara stabbing Ethan in the mouth. Following the ordeal, Tara receives medical treatment for her wounds and expresses sadness over Chad's apparent death. Luckily, Chad is wheeled out of the theater, having survived the attack, much to Tara's relief, and they kiss once more before he is taken to the hospital. After Sam states she will let Tara be more independent, Tara says she will to go to therapy to seek help and walks off with her sister into the city.

=== Richie Kirsch ===
- Portrayed by Jack Quaid
- Appeared in: Scream (2022), and Scream VI (archive footage)
- Status: Deceased

Richard "Richie" Kirsch is introduced in Scream (2022) as Sam Carpenter's boyfriend and coworker of six months at a bowling alley in Modesto, California. When she learns her half-sister Tara was attacked and hospitalized, he goes with her to Woodsboro for emotional support. After Sam is attacked in the hospital by Ghostface, he overhears her tell Tara she (Sam) is Billy Loomis' illegitimate daughter, but decides to stay with her. He goes with her to seek out Dewey Riley, who warns her that, as her boyfriend, he's high on the list of suspects. He's also there when she speaks to Tara's friends. He later finds Tara being attacked by Ghostface and is mildly injured. Sam and Dewey arrive and, while Richie and the girls escape, Dewey is killed. Afterwards, they meet Sidney and, despite her warnings, decide to leave. On the way out, Tara realizes she lost her inhaler and Sam convinces Richie to go to Amber's house to get her spare. When they learn Ghostface is there, Sam is suspicious of Richie, though he warns her it could be Tara. After Sidney arrives, she and Sam subdue Ghostface, only for Richie to stab Sam, revealing himself as a killer, the other being Amber. They take them and the wounded Gale captive and reveal their plan: to make a real life reboot of "Stab" with Sam, as Billy's daughter, framed as the killer. Richie also stole Tara's inhaler so they would fall into his trap. However, they learn Tara is free (Richie's attempt to sow distrust in Sam failed), distracting them long enough for Sidney and Gale to deal with Amber while Sam fights Richie. She ultimately gets a knife and stabs him multiple times with it, and as a wounded and now-frightened Richie cowardly pleads for his life and asks about "his ending", Sam gives him his "ending" by slitting his throat, and then empties a gun taken from Gale into his corpse to be sure he is dead.

In Scream VI, he is seen again in footage of his Stab fan film saved by his father Wayne and siblings Quinn and Ethan, who collectively elect to avenge his death as Ghostface, to which Sam taunts them over most of Richie's "victims" having survived their wounds, with the majority to have died having been killed by Amber, and for Richie having exposed himself to be a helpless coward before she killed him.

=== Amber Freeman ===
- Portrayed by Mikey Madison
- Appeared in: Scream (2022), and Scream VI (photo only)
- Status: Deceased

Amber Freeman is a Woodsboro teenager and friend to Tara Carpenter, Wes Hicks, Chad Meeks-Martin, Mindy Meeks-Martin, and Liv McKenzie in Scream (2022). She is seen being threatened by Ghostface during Tara's attack. After Tara's attack, she and the rest of the teenagers go visit her in the hospital along with Tara's older half-sister Sam and her boyfriend, Richie Kirsch. She and the teenagers are kicked out of a bar, where Liv's summer fling Vince Schneider is killed by Ghostface. After Wes is murdered, she and the teens plan a party at her house to honor his memory. During this, Amber shoots Liv in the head and kills her after revealing herself as the killer. Amber shoots Gale and Richie reveals himself as her accomplice, taking Gale, Sidney, Sam, and Tara captive. She reveals that they were disappointed at the last Stab movie and wish to revive the franchise with a new killing spree to act as "source material" and break away from the "toxic fandom" label they feel they have unjustly received. It is also revealed that Amber stabbed Dewey Riley to death in the hospital when he tried to finish her off. Amber is killed after she is shot by Gale and lit on fire, burning alive while screaming, and is subsequently shot in the head by Tara.

In Scream VI, Amber is revealed to have committed the majority of the murders in Scream (2022), with all but one of Richie's attempts at killing having failed.

=== Mindy Meeks-Martin ===
- Portrayed by Jasmin Savoy Brown
- Appeared in: Scream (2022), Scream VI, and Scream 7
- Status: Alive

Mindy Meeks-Martin is a Woodsboro teenager and the fraternal twin sister of Chad. Through her mother, Martha, she is Randy Meeks's niece. Like her uncle, she is an avid horror fan. At the memorial party for Wes, she is attacked by Ghostface while watching Stab, mirroring the attack on Randy twenty-five years ago. After the killers are stopped, both Chad and Mindy are revealed to have survived and awaiting medical treatment.

The sixth movie details the group's lives in New York City, where Mindy has enrolled at Blackmore University and is in a relationship with Anika Kayoko. Upon Ghostface's return, Mindy shares her theories that they are in a "sequel to the requel", and states that nobody is safe from Ghostface. Shortly after, the group is attacked by Ghostface, and Anika is killed, leaving Mindy devastated. The group team up with Kirby Reed and decide to lure Ghostface to a trap at an abandoned movie theater turned shrine for the infamous killer. However, while on the way there, Mindy is stabbed by Ghostface and receives medical treatment. When the ordeal is finished, Mindy has realized who the killers are, and goes to warn the others, though is annoyed to find they have been stopped and she once again missed the monologue. Mindy instead returns to the hospital to continue receiving care for her wounds. In Scream 7 she and her brother work for Gale filming her TV appearances.

=== Chad Meeks-Martin ===
- Portrayed by Mason Gooding
- Appeared in: Scream (2022), Scream VI, and Scream 7
- Status: Alive

Chad Meeks-Martin is a Woodsboro teenager and the fraternal twin brother of Mindy. Through his mother, Martha, he is Randy Meeks's nephew. He is an athlete at Woodsboro High and the boyfriend of Liv McKenzie. He becomes protective of Liv after Vince Schneider tries to get her back one night at the bar. At the memorial party for Wes, he refuses Liv's request to go somewhere private out of fear of going with the killer. Liv storms away and Chad chases after her using location-sharing on his phone. Believing to have found Liv, he is instead attacked by Ghostface. After the killers are stopped, both Chad and Mindy are revealed to have survived and awaiting medical treatment.

In the sixth movie, Chad is revealed to have moved to New York City along with Sam, Tara, and Mindy, and enrolls in Blackmore University and has Ethan Landry as his roommate. He and Tara are also revealed to have a mutual crush on one another, as he tends to her following a party and the two almost kiss before being interrupted by Tara's roommate Quinn. When the group is attacked by Ghostface, Chad and Tara are able to escape, and Mindy and Sam also survive the attack. The group then decides to create a trap in an abandoned movie theater to lure Ghostface in. While waiting, Chad and Tara finally kiss, but Chad is stabbed and left for dead by a duo of Ghostfaces. Following the ordeal, Chad is revealed to have survived and Tara kisses him once more before he is taken to the hospital. In Scream 7 he and his sister work for Gale filming her TV appearances.

=== Liv McKenzie ===
- Portrayed by Sonia Ben Ammar
- Appeared in: Scream (2022)
- Status: Deceased

Olivia "Liv" McKenzie is a Woodsboro teenager and the girlfriend of Chad Meeks-Martin. She previously had a summer fling with Vince Schneider. At the memorial party for Wes, Liv becomes angry with Chad over his perceived mistrust of her. She leaves the house and returns later to find his body outside after being attacked. Panicked, she rushes inside to discuss the killer's identity with the remaining guests. In the ensuing argument, in which Amber accuses Liv of being the killer, Liv is shot in the head and killed by Amber who revealed herself as one of the killers.

=== Wes Hicks ===
- Portrayed by Dylan Minnette
- Appeared in: Scream (2022)
- Status: Deceased

Wesley "Wes" Hicks is a Woodsboro teenager and is also Sheriff Judy Hicks' son. He goes to Woodsboro High and is part of the friend group. He calls Sam and tells her about Tara's attack and is worried that the killer will target him and his mother due to Judy having a part in solving the previous killings. As he is preparing the table for dinner, Wes hears strange noises in the house. He goes to lock the front door for safety but is then attacked by Ghostface. He tries to hold off the knife but the killer forces it through his throat, killing him.

=== Vince Schneider ===
- Portrayed by Kyle Gallner
- Appeared in: Scream (2022)
- Status: Deceased

Vincent "Vince" Schneider is a resident of Woodsboro and had a summer fling with Liv McKenzie. After spending the night at the bar, he is murdered by Ghostface in a nearby alley, becoming the true first victim. When the group discusses potential suspects at the twins' house, it is revealed that Vince is the nephew of Stu Macher through his mother, Leslie.

== Introduced in Scream VI ==
=== Anika Kayoko ===
- Portrayed by Devyn Nekoda
- Appeared in Scream VI
- Status: Deceased

Anika Kayoko is shown to attend Blackmore University and is the girlfriend of Mindy. While being attacked by Ghostface in Sam and Tara's apartment, Anika is choked and then stabbed in the abdomen before escaping to a bedroom with Mindy and Sam. While trying to escape across a ladder into an adjacent apartment, Ghostface breaks into the room and violently shakes the ladder Anika is trying to cross while Mindy, Sam & Danny try to rescue her. Ghostface manages to shake the ladder enough, causing Anika to violently fall to her death.

=== Dr. Christopher Stone ===
- Portrayed by Henry Czerny
- Appeared in Scream VI
- Status: Deceased

Dr. Christopher Stone, simply referred to as Dr. Stone, appears as Sam's therapist who she has been visiting to deal with her traumatic experience in Woodsboro. It is revealed that Sam has been withholding details of her past and when she finally reveals the events that took place and her satisfaction in killing Richie, he is shown to be apprehensive of her and admits that he will have to inform the police of her admission. Stone is then later murdered at his house the following day by Ghostface, who stabs him through the nose and steals Sam's file from his records.

=== Danny Brackett ===
- Portrayed by Josh Segarra
- Appeared in Scream VI
- Status: Alive

Danny Brackett is shown to live in the apartment opposite Sam and Tara. He and Sam are revealed to be in a secret relationship after making out in the hallway. When Sam and her friends are being attacked and chased in the apartment, Danny is able to extend a ladder through his open window over to Sam's apartment for them to climb over. He manages to help Sam and Mindy climb over, but is unable to save Anika. Danny is then shown on his way to the Ghostface shrine where Sam and Tara plan on luring the killer to then execute him. Sam tells Danny to keep away as she cannot trust him for sure and also doesn't want him to be hurt. He is then seen at the end of the movie, reuniting with Sam once Ghostface has been stopped.

=== Ethan Landry ===
- Portrayed by Jack Champion
- Appeared in Scream VI
- Status: Deceased

Ethan Landry is shown to be a freshman at Blackmore University and is roommates with Chad Meeks-Martin. After the group are attacked at Sam and Tara's apartment and Anika is killed, Mindy and Chad suspect Ethan is responsible. However, Ethan swears he was attending class on campus with numerous others, thereby exonerating him. When the group are later trying to board a subway carriage, Mindy and Ethan are cut off from the others and have to wait for the next train to arrive. Mindy keeps her distance from Ethan, still suspicious of his whereabouts from the night before and once they board the next train, keeps clear of him. Mindy is then stabbed by Ghostface, who has followed her on the subway, and Ethan rushes to her aid before calling for help. During the finale at the Ghostface shrine, Ethan is later unmasked as one of the killers along with Detective Wayne, who is revealed to be his father and Quinn Bailey, his sister. It's also revealed that "Ethan Landry" is not even his real name and that Richie Kirsch was Ethan's oldest brother, the family now seeking revenge on Sam for the "brutality" she took in killing him. Ethan tries to attack Tara, who is hanging from a railing above, trying to climb up but cannot do so. Tara then manages to arm herself with a knife and drops down, crashing onto Ethan who manages to stab her once, but just as Ethan gloats, Tara quickly manages to violently stab him in the mouth, presumably killing him. He is later shown to still be alive but is promptly killed by Kirby Reed, who drops a television on his head.

=== Jason Carvey and Greg Bruckner ===
- Portrayed by Tony Revolori and Thom Newell
- Appeared in Scream VI
- Status: Both deceased

Jason Carvey is first seen in the cold open after revealing himself to be the Ghostface who has just murdered college professor Laura Crane, after catfishing her as "Reggie". It is revealed that Jason, along with his roommate Greg Bruckner, had been planning to finish creating the "movie" that Richie Kirsch set out to make the year previously by killing the Carpenter sisters. After murdering Laura, Jason returns to his apartment where he is taunted by another Ghostface, pretending to be Greg over the phone. Jason is lured to his refrigerator by the new Ghostface, where he discovers Greg's dismembered body before being brutally stabbed and murdered by Ghostface.

=== Laura Crane ===
- Portrayed by Samara Weaving
- Appeared in Scream VI
- Status: Deceased

Laura Crane is a film studies professor at Blackmore University in New York City. She is first shown in a bar waiting for an online date, Reggie, to arrive. When Reggie contacts her, looking for directions on how to reach her, she leaves the bar and heads to an empty alleyway where she believes she has found him only for Reggie to reveal himself as Ghostface, who jumps out from the darkness and viciously stabs her to death. Ghostface then unmasks himself to be Jason Carvey, one of Laura's film students who had plotted to murder her with his friend, Greg, after catfishing her online. Jason later described his pleasure at murdering Laura in great detail to "Greg" on the phone, before finding Greg dead and being murdered by another Ghostface himself.

=== Quinn Bailey ===
- Portrayed by Liana Liberato
- Appeared in Scream VI
- Status: Deceased

Quinn Bailey is Tara's roommate, who also attends Blackmore University. Her father is Detective Wayne, who she reveals followed her to New York when she began attending college, after the death of her brother prior. She is shown to be a sex-positive young woman who has numerous male partners over in her apartment. Quinn's bedroom window looks directly opposite Danny Brackett's apartment, where he witnesses Ghostface standing over her while she lies in bed on the phone oblivious to her surroundings. Danny tries to alert Quinn and eventually gets through to Sam, who is in the kitchen, when he sends video footage of Ghostface stabbing Quinn. The others in the apartment then gather in the living room where Quinn's body is thrown through the door, showing her throat has also been slashed. After Detective Wayne is revealed to be one of the three Ghostface killers, he also reveals that Quinn had faked her death and is in fact one of his accomplices, along with her brother Ethan. It is also revealed that Richie Kirsch was Quinn's other brother and the family are now seeking revenge on Sam for killing him, with Quinn revealed to be the one who started the rumors that aimed to defame Sam online. During the finale at the Ghostface shrine, Quinn finds Sam above and gleefully prepares to kill her, only for Sam to let go of Tara and grab a gun, and Quinn becomes horrified as Tara stabs her brother Ethan below. Sam taunts Quinn that she has lost "another brother", provoking an enraged Quinn to desperately try to attack her, but Sam shoots Quinn in the forehead before she can even reach her, killing her instantly.

=== Wayne Bailey ===
- Portrayed by Dermot Mulroney
- Appeared in Scream VI
- Status: Deceased

Detective Wayne Bailey is a detective investigating the latest Ghostface killings in New York City. Detective Bailey is shown as the father of Quinn Bailey, who works for the NYPD and is assigned to work on the case following the recent Ghostface attacks. He works with Kirby Reed, who is now an FBI agent to try and track down the killer.

Wayne is shown visibly upset after his daughter has been murdered, following an attack at Sam and Tara's apartment and reveals he has been removed from the case. He then teams with Sam to help kill whoever is behind the Ghostface mask, as revenge for his murdered daughter. During the finale, Wayne contacts Sam and reveals that Kirby had been previously fired from the FBI due to delusions regarding her previous attack and that she has trapped them in the Ghostface shrine. Once he arrives at the shrine, he shoots Kirby and reveals himself as the mastermind behind the Ghostface killings, with his son Ethan and daughter, a still alive Quinn, who he helped fake her death. Wayne reveals that Richie Kirsch was his eldest son and he, along with Ethan and Quinn, seeks revenge against Sam for killing him, while it is also revealed he supported Richie's obsessions to the Ghostface killings and movies despite not liking them himself. Wayne's schemes for revenge fail as Sam and Tara get the upper hand, with Wayne losing his composure as Sam and Tara take down his two children. Sam then turns the Ghostface trick on Wayne by taunting him with a phone call using the voice changer and violently stabbing Wayne multiple times while dressed in her father's Ghostface mask and costume, all while Wayne exposes himself to be a helpless coward like Richie. Sam then states that she is better than her father and other killers no matter what Wayne thinks, and Wayne believes that Sam will not kill him and thanks her, only for Sam to kill Wayne by stabbing him through the eye, stating that he "did fuck with her family".

== Introduced in Scream 7 ==
=== Aaron ===
- Portrayed by Cyle Winters
- Appeared in: Scream 7
- Status: Deceased

Aaron is one of Tatum's classmates assisting in Pine Grove High's musical production of The Fairy Princess. Aaron is the controller of the harness that Hannah is performing on. During practice, he is killed by having his throat slit by Ghostface, who hijacks the harness.

=== Ben Brown ===
- Portrayed by Sam Rechner
- Appeared in: Scream 7
- Status: Deceased

Ben Brown is Tatum's boyfriend who Sidney does not seem to take a liking to. He also one of Tatum's friends group and Lucas's best friend. Tatum initially thinks Ben is Ghostface due to an AI-generated video of Stu on his laptop. However, he gets stabbed to death in front of her in the abdomen and presumably dies off-screen

=== Chloe Parker ===
- Portrayed by Celeste O'Connor
- Appeared in Scream 7
- Status: Deceased

Chloe Parker is one of Tatum's best friends. Chloe's parents own a tavern in Pine Grove. She has a crush on Lucas that he seems to reciprocate. She is later killed when Ghostface throws her into some pint glasses, with one of the shards of glass impaling her neck.

=== Emma Evans ===
- Portrayed by Maggie Toomey
- Appeared in Scream 7
- Status: Alive

Emma Evans is Sidney and Mark's middle daughter, Tatum's young sister and Rebecca's older sister. She and Rebecca were staying with their grandmother in another town before the murder occurred and after Hannah is killed, the siblings are placed under the protection of the Denver Police force.

=== George Willis ===
- Portrayed by Tim Simons
- Appeared in: Scream 7
- Status: Alive

George Willis is the drama teacher at Pine Grove High. He looks down on Tatum and unfavorably compares her to her mother.

=== Hannah Thurman ===
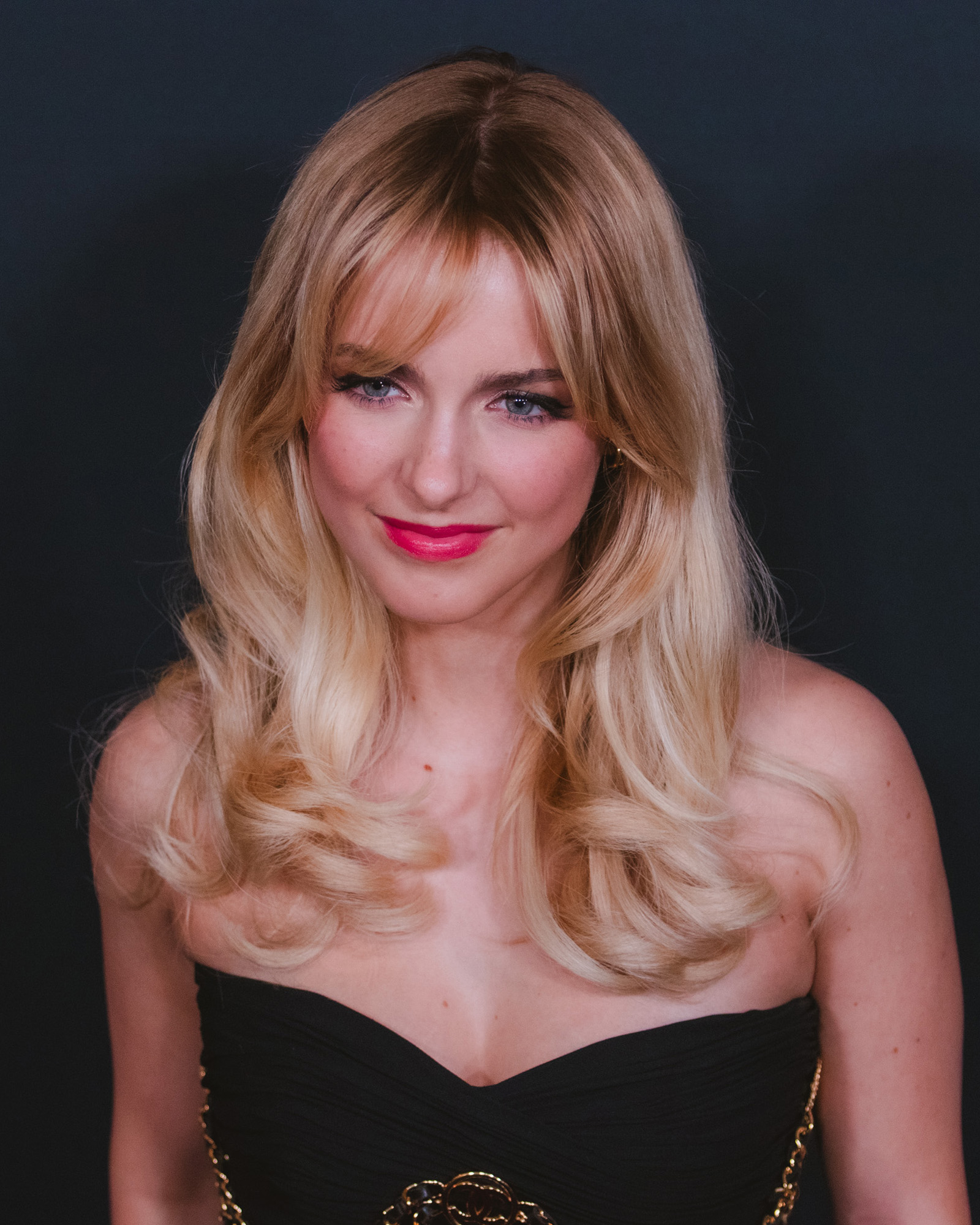
Mckenna Grace plays Hannah Thurman.

- Portrayed by Mckenna Grace
- Appeared in: Scream 7
- Status: Deceased

Hannah Thurman is one of Tatum's best friends. She is starring as the eponymous character in Pine Grove High's musical production of The Fairy Princess. She mentions to Tatum and Chloe that she is hosting a party later that day. While practicing take-offs and landings with Aaron, Hannah is left hanging from the stage during rehearsal after Aaron is killed. Ghostface hijacks the harness and causes Hannah to swing back and forth before entering on-stage and slashing at her, eventually disemboweling her.

=== Jessica Bowden ===
- Portrayed by Anna Camp
- Appeared in: Scream 7
- Status: Deceased

Jessica Bowden is Sidney's neighbor and the mother of Lucas Bowden. She is one of the Ghostface killers due to Sidney disappearing from public life and not present during the New York City Killings. She was motivated by Sidney’s book Out of Darkness (referenced in Scream 4), to kill her abusive husband. She is shot multiple times in the face by Sidney and Tatum.

=== Karl Gibbs ===
- Portrayed by Kraig Dane
- Appeared in: Scream 7
- Status: Deceased

Karl Gibbs is a murderer who killed three women prior to being committed and escaping from the Pine Grove Mental Institution. He is one of the Ghostface killers who gets killed early on by getting run over by Gale, Chad, and Mindy. When he is unmasked, only Sidney recognizes him, with Gale noting how it is odd that he is not related to anyone Sidney or Tatum knows.

=== Lucas Bowden ===
- Portrayed by Asa Germann
- Appeared in: Scream 7
- Status: Deceased

Lucas Bowden is one of Tatum's friends. He is obsessed with true crime and is also Ben's best friend. He and his mother are Sidney's neighbors. Chloe has a crush on him, which he seems to reciprocate. He is killed by having his head impaled on a bar tap ornament by his own mother, Jessica.

=== Madison ===
- Portrayed by Michelle Randolph
- Appeared in: Scream 7
- Status: Deceased

Madison is Scott's girlfriend who travels with him to Stu Macher's house in the cold open. After Scott is killed, she gets in a chase with Ghostface. Madison ends up dangling on a chandelier, where she falls, gets stabbed in the gut by the killer, and set on fire.

=== Marco Davis ===
- Portrayed by Ethan Embry
- Appeared in: Scream 7
- Status: Deceased

Marco Davis works at a mental institution near Pine Grove. When Sidney and Gale visit him in the psychiatric hospital, he lies about Stu Macher being alive, and is revealed to be one of the Ghostface killers, and has a background in AI engineering that allowed him to create AI deepfakes of past Ghostface killers and Dewey. He gets shot in the head by Sidney after Mark frees Tatum.

=== Mark Evans ===
- Portrayed by Joel McHale
- Appeared in: Scream 7
- Status: Alive

Mark Evans is Sidney's husband and Tatum, Emma and Rebecca's father. He is a police officer of Pine Grove. He was stabbed multiple times by Ghostface while in the extension section of his house and survives the Pine Grove killings.

=== Rebecca Evans ===
- Portrayed by Annabelle Toomey
- Appeared in Scream 7
- Status: Alive

Rebecca Evans is Sidney and Mark's youngest daughter and Tatum and Emma's young sister. She and Emma were staying with their grandmother in another town before the murders occurred. After Hannah is killed, Rebecca and her sister are placed under the protection of the Denver Police force.

=== Robbie Rivers ===
- Portrayed by Mark Consuelos
- Appeared in Scream 7
- Status: Alive

Robbie Rivers is the news television host from Pine Grove, who hosts a TV spot with Gale and Sidney in hopes to attract "Stu" to call

=== Scott ===
- Portrayed by Jimmy Tatro
- Appeared in Scream 7
- Status: Deceased

Scott is Madison's boyfriend who is a fan of the Stab films who decided to stay at Stu Macher's house in the cold open. He is later killed by being stabbed multiple times in the chest and head by Ghostface.

=== Tatum Evans ===
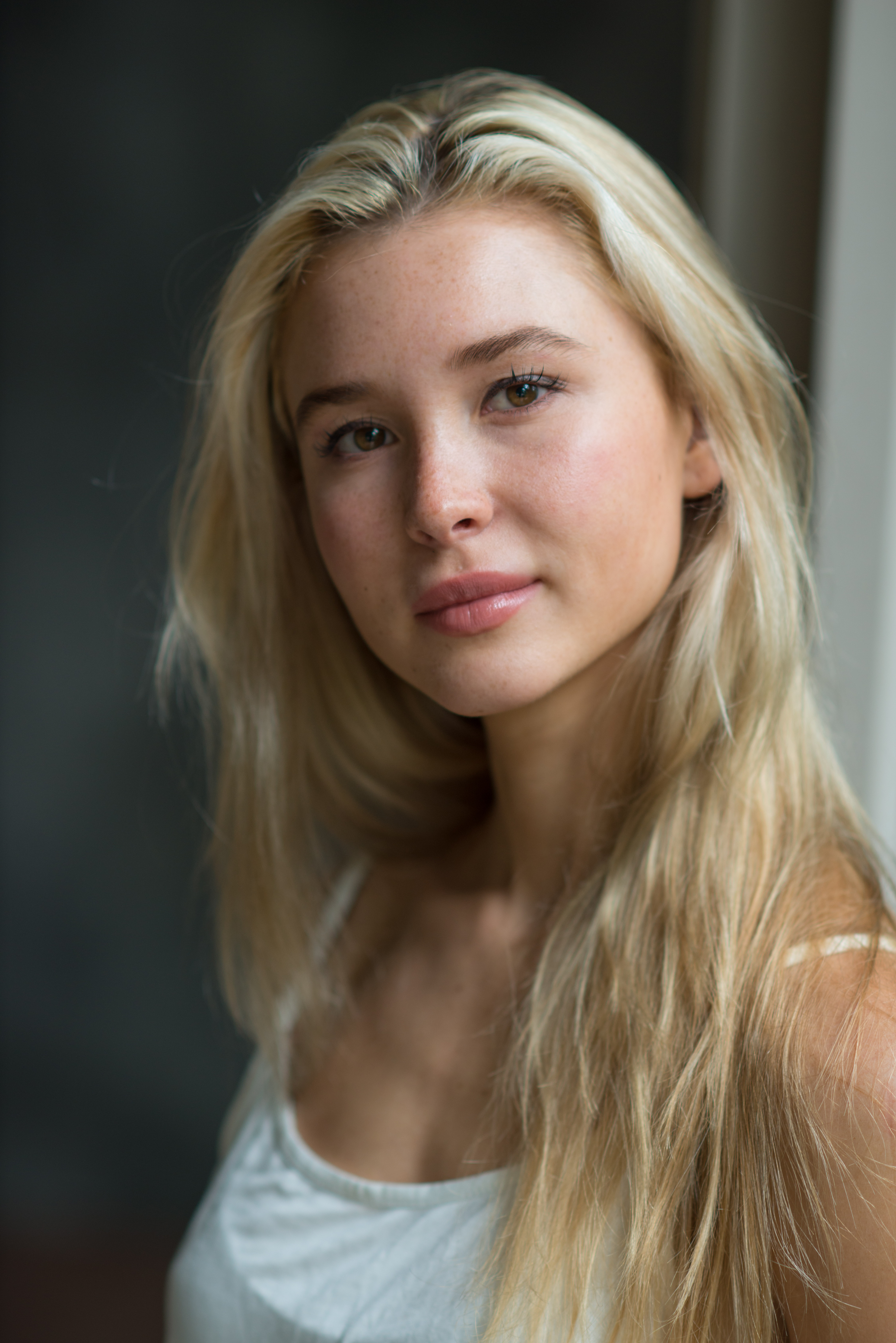
Isabel May plays Tatum Evans.

- Portrayed by Isabel May
- Appeared in: Scream 7
- Status: Alive

Tatum Evans is Sidney and Mark's oldest daughter and Emma and Rebecca's older sister. She was named after Sidney's deceased childhood best friend, Tatum Riley, in honor of her. She is Ghostface's new main target. She eventually end up being held hostage, where her mother later work together and to stop Marco and Jessica.

== Reception ==
Neve Campbell praised the role of Sidney Prescott, saying she "adored" the character and "she's a fantastic character for any kind of movie." In 1997, the Scream role won Campbell the Saturn Award for Best Actress and an MTV Movie Award for Best Female Performance nomination. The following year she went on to win the 1998 Best Female Performance for Scream 2 and received a second nomination for the Saturn Award for Best Actress, losing to Jodie Foster for Contact (1997). She received a third and final Best Female Performance nomination from MTV in 2000 for the character in Scream 3, but lost to fellow Scream alum Sarah Michelle Gellar for Cruel Intentions (1999).

Barrymore and Ulrich also received Saturn Award nominations in 1997 for Scream, for Best Supporting Actress and Best Supporting Actor respectively. Although critical of the film itself, Variety singled out Campbell and Ulrich for praise as "charismatic", liking Cox's playing against type as the ambitious reporter Gale and saying the film had a "strong ensemble cast".

John Muir, author of Wes Craven: The Art of Horror, was critical of the new characters introduced in Scream 2 – Derek, Joel, Cici, Hallie, Lois, Murphy and Mickey – stating that they never attained the same depth of character as Scream characters such as Tatum Riley, Billy Loomis and Stu Macher, or even minor characters like Principal Himbry. Muir cited the sequel's focus on increased body counts and violence as the cause of this discrepancy in the quality of the two films' characters. He added that, as a result, Scream 2 lacked the same mystery or intrigue as the original, as the killer could be any character, purely because the audience is never provided with enough information to form an opinion of them. Roger Ebert agreed with this criticism, saying "there is no way to guess who's doing the killing, and everyone who seems suspicious is (almost) sure to be innocent."

However, Muir praised the development of the surviving characters of Scream, labeling Gale Weathers, Dewey Riley, Sidney Prescott, and Randy Meeks as "beloved" and claiming that the death of Randy was the most devastating moment of the sequel and a "bad move". Variety's Leonard Klady was more appreciative of some of the new cast, calling Laurie Metcalf and Liev Schreiber "standout" talent. Cox received a Saturn Award for Best Supporting Actress nomination for her role in Scream 2, but lost to Gloria Stuart for Titanic (1997).

On the characters of Scream 3, Roger Ebert was critical, stating "[the characters] are so thin, they're transparent", but he praised Neve Campbell's appearance as Sidney Prescott, saying "The camera loves her. She could become a really big star and then giggle at clips from this film at her AFI tribute". The New York Times praised her role equally highly, saying "She has developed as an actress; when her eyes go dark with concern and fear, she is nerve-racked and tormented, not play-acting." Harry Knowles of Ain't It Cool News was less complimentary about Campbell, saying "She adds ZERO coolness. Zero talent. And Zero charisma to [Scream 3]." The BBC's Tom Coates and Elvis Mitchell of the New York Times praised Parker Posey's character, with Mitchell saying "[Jennifer Jolie] alone makes the picture worth seeing. Dizzy and nakedly – hilariously – ambitious, she's so flighty she seems to be levitating." So well received was Posey's character that she received an MTV Movie Award for Best Comedic Performance nomination in 2000 for the role, although she lost to Adam Sandler for Big Daddy (1999). Mitchell also praised the characters of Sarah Darling (McCarthy), Tyson Fox (Richmond) and Steven Stone (Warburton), calling them "assets" to the film. In 2001, as part of the American Film Institute''s AFI 100 Years... series, the character of Ghostface became one of the four hundred nominees in the "100 Heroes and Villains" category.

On the characters of Scream 4, Film 4 complimented the new additions to the cast, isolating Robbie Mercer and Charlie Walker as the best of the new characters, while the Los Angeles Times called Panettiere's film-nerd Kirby Reed "feisty", labeling her the most "intriguing" new addition to the series.

The first season of Scream has received a mixed response from critics. On the review aggregate website Rotten Tomatoes, it has a rating of 47%, based on 29 reviews, with a 5.4/10 average rating. The site's critical consensus reads, "Lacking truly compelling characters or scenarios, Scream is forced to trade too heavily on nostalgia for its big-screen predecessors in the franchise." On Metacritic, which assigns a normalized rating, the series has a score of 57 out of 100, based on 20 critics, indicating "mixed or average reviews".

In a positive review, David Hinckley from New York Daily News awarded the pilot four out of five stars and stated, "Happily, Scream maintains a sense of humor, reinforced with snappy, self-aware pop culture dialogue." Similarly, Brian Lowry of Variety commended the show's ability to maintain suspense "without much actually happening during the rest of the episode," noting its use of music, but expressing skepticism if the series could maintain its originality. Aedan Juvet of PopWrapped gave a positive assessment of the series and called it, "a prime example of a game-changing horror series." Conversely, David Wiegand of the San Francisco Chronicle panned the series and gave it one out of four stars, criticizing the acting performances as "bland, robotic, and uninteresting" as well as its apparent lack of racial diversity. In a mixed review, Mark Perigard of the Boston Herald gave the show a C+, saying, "There are a few scares here, but while the Scream films kept audiences jumping, Scream: The TV series risks putting viewers to sleep."

=== Awards and nominations ===
The cast of the Scream series have won, or been nominated for, several awards, most notably Campbell who has received the most wins and nominations of the cast for her role as Sidney Prescott, including the Saturn Award for Best Actress for Scream (1996) and MTV Movie Award for Best Performance for Scream 2 (1997). For Scream (1996) Skeet Ulrich and Drew Barrymore received Saturn Award nominations for Best Supporting Actor. Cox received a Saturn Award for Best Supporting Actress nomination for her role in Scream 2 but lost to Gloria Stuart for Titanic (1997). Despite her brief cameo appearance as "Sidney Prescott" in the film within a film "Stab" series, Tori Spelling was nominated for a Razzie Award for "Worst New Actress" in Scream 2. Arquette won Blockbuster Entertainment Awards in the "Favorite Actor – Horror" and "Favorite Actor – Horror" (Internet Only) categories for his role in Scream 2 and Scream 3, and also won Teen Choice Awards for his role in Scream 3 in the "Choice Chemistry" (along with Cox) respectively. Melissa Barrera was nominated at the Golden Scythe Horror Awards for Best Actress In a Leading Role for her amazing performance in Scream Vl (2023). Parker Posey's role as Jennifer Jolie received near unanimous praise from critics, with the New York Times Elvis Mitchell saying "[Posey] alone makes the picture worth seeing. Dizzy and nakedly – hilariously – ambitious, she's so flighty she seems to be levitating." So well received was her performance that she received an MTV Movie Award for Best Comedic Performance nomination in 2000 for the role but lost to Adam Sandler for Big Daddy (1999). Jenna Ortega won Most Frightened Performance at the MTV Movie & TV Awards for Scream (2022), which was also nominated for Best Movie. The film series itself has been the recipient of several awards, including Best Horror Film at the Saturn Awards and the MTV Movie Award for Best Movie for Scream (1996). Scream VI (2023) won for Best Movie (the second time a movie in the franchise has won Best Movie at the MTV Awards) and Best Fight (Courteney Cox vs Ghostface).

Year	Award	Category	Actor	Film	Result	Ref.
1996	Saturn Award	Best Actress	Neve Campbell	Scream	Won	
1996	Saturn Award	Best Supporting Actor	Skeet Ulrich	Scream	Nominated	
1996	Saturn Award	Best Supporting Actress	Drew Barrymore	Scream	Nominated	
1997	Fangoria Chainsaw Award	Best Actress	Neve Campbell	Scream	Won	
1997	Fangoria Chainsaw Award	Best Supporting Actor	Skeet Ulrich	Scream	Nominated	
1997	Fangoria Chainsaw Award	Best Supporting Actress	Drew Barrymore	Scream	Won	
1997	MTV Movie Award	Best Female Performance	Neve Campbell	Scream	Nominated	
1997	Razzie Award	Worst New Star	Tori Spelling	Scream 2	Nominated	
1998	Fangoria Chainsaw Award	Best Actress	Neve Campbell	Scream 2	Nominated	
1998	Fangoria Chainsaw Award	Best Supporting Actor	Liev Schreiber	Scream 2	Nominated	
1998	Fangoria Chainsaw Award	Best Supporting Actress	Courteney Cox	Scream 2	Won	
1998	Saturn Award	Best Actress	Neve Campbell	Scream 2	Nominated	
1998	Saturn Award	Best Supporting Actress	Courteney Cox	Scream 2	Nominated	
1998	MTV Movie Award	Best Female Performance	Neve Campbell	Scream 2	Won	
1998	Blockbuster Entertainment Award	Favorite Actor – Horror	David Arquette	Scream 2	Won	
1998	Blockbuster Entertainment Award	Favorite Actress – Horror	Neve Campbell	Scream 2	Won	
1998	Blockbuster Entertainment Award	Favorite Actress – Horror	Courteney Cox	Scream 2	Nominated	
1998	Blockbuster Entertainment Award	Favorite Supporting Actor – Horror	Jamie Kennedy	Scream 2	Won	
1998	Blockbuster Entertainment Award	Favorite Supporting Actress – Horror	Jada Pinkett-Smith	Scream 2	Nominated	
2000	MTV Movie Award	Best Comedic Performance	Parker Posey	Scream 3	Nominated	
2000	MTV Movie Award	Best Female Performance	Neve Campbell	Scream 3	Nominated	
2001	Blockbuster Entertainment Award	Favorite Actor – Horror	David Arquette	Scream 3	Won	
2001	Blockbuster Entertainment Award	Favorite Actress – Horror	Neve Campbell	Scream 3	Won	
2001	Blockbuster Entertainment Award	Favorite Actress – Horror	Courteney Cox	Scream 3	Nominated	
2001	Fangoria Chainsaw Award	Best Supporting Actress	Parker Posey	Scream 3	Won	
2011	Scream Awards	Best Horror Actress	Neve Campbell	Scream 4	Nominated	
2011	Scream Awards	Best Cameo	Kristen Bell; Anna Paquin	Scream 4	Nominated	
2011	Fright Meter Awards	Best Supporting Actress	Hayden Panettiere	Scream 4	Nominated	
2022	MTV Movie & TV Awards	Most Frightened Performance	Jenna Ortega	Scream	Won	
2023	MTV Movie & TV Awards	Best Fight	Courteney Cox vs. Ghostface	Scream VI	Won	
2023	Fangoria Chainsaw Award	Best Supporting Performance	Jenna Ortega	Scream	Nominated	
2023	Golden Scythe Horror Awards	Best Actress in a Leading Role	Melissa Barrera	Scream VI	Nominated	
2024	Critics' Choice Super Award	Best Actress in a Horror Movie	Jenna Ortega	Scream VI	Nominated	
