= Judy Rothman =

American screenwriter

- Born: Judy Rothman Rofé; September 17, 1962 (age 64)
- Occupations: Screenwriter, producer, lyricist, author
- Employer: The Disney Channel (formerly)
- Known for: The New Adventures of Madeline; Julie's Greenroom; Angelina Ballerina: The Next Steps; The Neurotic Parent blog and books
- Writing career
- Genres: Children's television, comedy, satire
- Notable awards: Daytime Emmy Award (2002); Humanitas Prize

Judy Rothman Rofé (born September 17, 1962) is an American screenwriter, producer, lyricist and author specializing in comedy and literary adaptations for children. She won the 2002 Emmy for Best Animated Program for The New Adventures of Madeline (based on the books by Ludwig Bemelmans), for which she was writer, lyricist, story editor and supervising producer on over 70 episodes. She was nominated for seven additional Emmys, and also won an Ace award and the Humanitas Prize. In 2016 Rothman created the preschool television series Julie's Greenroom with Julie Andrews and Emma Walton Hamilton. The show stars Julie Andrews, who is joined by her assistant Gus (Giullian Yao Gioiello) and the “Greenies,” a cast of original puppets built by The Jim Henson Company and premiered on Netflix on March 17, 2017.

Rothman was a previously an executive at the Disney Channel and has written and developed dozens of series and specials, including Arthur (PBS), Angelina Ballerina: The Next Steps (PBS), Rainbow Fish, "Big Bird Gets Lost", Bill and Ted's Excellent Adventures, Camp Candy, and the animated feature film Trumpet of the Swan. She and Alex Rockwell are currently showrunners and writers/executive producers/lyricists on Norman Picklestripes, a new 52-episode stop-motion comedy series in production at the Factory animation studio in Manchester, UK for Universal Kids, which was nominated for the 2020 Annie, Emmy, Kidscreen and Cynopsis awards.

Rothman's songs have been featured on many television programs and have been released on four Sony and Rhino CDs. She collaborated with Joe Raposo on the Madeline theme song and also wrote the lyrics for the theme song of the long-running Canadian series Mona the Vampire. She has worked on many songs with New York composer/songwriter/lyricist/pianist Jeffrey Zahn of JoJo's Circus, as well as with composer/pianist Andy Street on Madeline and Strawberry Shortcake. She was the head writer, lyricist and supervising producer with British composer/pianist Mark Sayer-Wade, composer/lyricist/songwriter/guitarist Mark Williamson, co-lyricist/songwriter Scott Erickson and songwriter Joseph K. Phillips of the PBS Kids animated series Angelina Ballerina: The Next Steps and lyricist with Alex Rockwell for Jim Henson's Pajanimals and "Jim Henson's Word Party." Rothman is also developing a 2D series for the Ontario-based Nelvana.

Rothman has also gained fame as the formerly anonymous The Neurotic Parent author, essayist and anonymous blogger, whose satiric guide to college admissions was published using the name J.D. Rothman in March 2012 by Prospect Park Books.

"I started the Neurotic Parent blog four years ago in 2008 as a lark when one of the moms from my son’s soccer team heard that I was going on a college trip with my son, and that we’d be visiting 12 schools in 9 days across 8 states. She thought logistically I’d have a lot to blog about, but when I saw how the parents and kids behave on these tours – and it was mind-blowing – I became a neurotic parent when I wasn’t neurotic before. The blog took off – it went viral just about the fifth day – and was discovered by an admissions officer from Kenyon College who published an excerpt. About two years later my current publisher, who was then a neurotic parent herself, discovered the blog and asked me to turn it into a book."

A previous portion of the blog was published anonymously in I'm Going to College, Not You, edited by Jennifer Delahunty, the dean of admissions of Kenyon College. The book, a Los Angeles Times bestseller, based on the blog is titled The Neurotic Parent's Guide to College Admissions.

== Screenwriting credits ==
=== Television ===
- Maxie's World (1987)
- Fantastic Max (1988–1990)
- ALF Tales (1989)
- Camp Candy (1989)
- Bill & Ted’s Excellent Adventures (1991)
- Captain Zed and the Zee Zone (1991, 1993)
- Super Dave: Daredevil for Hire (1992)
- Madeline (1993–2001)
- The Puzzle Place (1995)
- Strawberry Shortcake (2003)
- ToddWorld (2004)
- Happy Monster Band (2007–2008)
- Angelina Ballerina: The Next Steps (2009)
- Word Party (2016)
- Julie's Greenroom (2017)
- Norman Picklestripes (2019–2021)

=== Film ===
- Monster Mash (2000)
- The Trumpet of the Swan (2001)
