= Madeline (TV series) =

American animated television series

- Genre: Children's television series
- Based on: Madeline by Ludwig Bemelmans
- Developed by: Judy Rothman
- Directed by: Stan Phillips (seasons 1–2); Judy Reilly (season 3)
- Voices of: Tracey Lee Smythe; Andrea Libman; Stevie Vallance; French Tickner; Chantal Strand
- Narrated by: Christopher Plummer (specials, seasons 1–2); Christopher Gaze (season 3)
- Theme music composer: Joe Raposo
- Composer: Andy Street
- Countries of origin: United States (Note: Pilot and TV series); Canada (Note: Specials 2–6); France (Note: Specials 2–6)
- Original languages: English; French
- No. of seasons: 3
- No. of episodes: 59 (and 6 specials)

Production
- Executive producers: Andy Heyward; Michael Maliani (Seasons 2-3); Robby London; Saul Cooper; Pancho Kohner
- Producer: Stan Phillips (seasons 1–2)
- Running time: 22 minutes
- Production companies: DIC Entertainment, L.P.; CINAR Films (specials 2–6); France Animation (specials 2–6); Hi-Tops Video (specials)

Original release
- Network: HBO (pilot); Global Television Network (specials 2–6); Family Channel (specials 2–6); FR3 (specials 2–6); The Family Channel (season 1); ABC (season 2); Disney Channel (Playhouse Disney) (season 3)
- Release: September 12, 1993 – February 28, 2001

Madeline is an animated preschool television series produced by DIC Entertainment, L.P., as part of the Madeline media franchise. It began as a series of six television specials from 1988 to 1991, and then continued as Madeline and The New Adventures of Madeline from 1993 to 2001. The show is narrated by Christopher Plummer, and it features songs written by various songwriters, composers and lyricists.

== Background ==
In 1960, the Madeline stories were adapted to a one-hour color episode for the NBC series The Shirley Temple Show. Madeline was played by Gina Gillespie, child actor Michel Petit played Pepito, and Imogene Coca portrayed Miss Clavel. The episode, as Madeline's first appearance on television, has been released to DVD.

== Cast and characters ==
=== Main cast ===
- Madeline (voiced by Tracey-Lee Smyth in season 1 and Andrea Libman in seasons 2 & 3) is the central protagonist of the show. She is a kind, caring and adventurous redheaded French girl, and the bravest of her group—despite being the shortest. She lives in a girls' boarding school with eleven other girls and their instructor, Miss Clavel, in Paris, France.
- Miss Clavel (voiced by Louise Vallance) (Note: Credited under the name Louise Vallance for the first two seasons; and Stephanie Louise Vallance for the third season.) is an educator and headmistress that oversees the boarding school in which the girls live. She and her students say grace before every meal. She is seen as a caring and wise maternal figure to the girls, notably rushing Madeline to hospital in the middle of the night for an emergency appendix removal in the original episode.
- The Eleven Little Girls are Anne, Chloe, Danielle, Ellie, Janine, Lulu, Monique, Nicole, Nona, Sylvie and Yvette, all resident students at the boarding school with Madeline. In addition to their schooling, the girls join Madeline on many adventures and escapades. During the first few seasons and specials, only Chloe, Danielle and Nicole had significant roles; by the third season, all the girls became more vocal, active, and displayed their own respective personalities.
  - Chloe (voiced by Vanessa King in seasons 1 & 2 and Veronika Sztopa in season 3)
  - Danielle (voiced by Kelly Sheridan in season 1, Tracey-Lee Smyth in season 2 and Chantal Strand in season 3)
  - Nicole (voiced by Kristin Fairlie in season 1, Veronika Sztopa in season 2 and Britt Irvin in season 3)
- Pepito (voiced by A.J. Bond in season 1, David Morse in season 2, and Michael Heyward/Kyle Labine in season 3) is the young son of the Spanish ambassador to France whose family lives nextdoor to the girls' boarding school. Initially, he is seen as naughty, mean, and spoiled to Madeline and her friends; they soon become best friends.
- Genevieve (voiced by Louise Vallance) is the school's pet dog, once a stray. Madeline has the most affection for her, as Genevieve rescued her from drowning in the river Seine.
- Lord Cucuface (voiced by French Tickner) is the administrator of a chain of institutions that oversees the girls' school. He maintains a close friendship with Miss Clavel.
- The Narrator (voiced by Christopher Plummer in the specials, seasons 1 & 2 and Christopher Gaze in season 3) is present throughout each episode to describe each scenario, often reading passages from the books.

=== Additional voices ===
- Long John Baldry
- Kathleen Barr
- Nigel Bennett
- Susan Blu
- Jay Brazeau
- Jim Byrnes
- Garry Chalk
- Caroline Chan
- Brent Chapman
- Babz Chula
- Joely Collins
- Jennifer Copping
- Ian James Corlett
- Brenda Crichlow
- Deborah Demille
- Alex Doduk
- Michael Donovan
- Justin Escabedo
- Andrew Francis
- Merrilyn Gann
- Christopher Gaze
- MacKenzie Gray
- Adam Harrison
- Phil Hayes
- Kirosha Hemmings
- Paige Heuser
- Mark Hildreth
- Pam Hyatt
- Hailey Jenkins
- Andrew Kavadas
- Peter Kelamis
- Corrine Koslo
- Marilyn Lightstone
- Norma MacMillan
- Sam Mancuso
- Blu Mankuma
- Brenda McDonald
- Danny McKinnon
- Don McManus
- Scott McNeil
- Maxine Miller
- Chris Molineux
- Wezley Morris
- Kathy Morse
- Jane Mortifee
- Richard Newman
- Luke Palmer
- Jayne Paterson
- Taylor-Anne Reid
- Robert O. Smith
- Tabitha St. Germain
- Denis Thatcher
- Jane Thompson
- Kaitlin Turner
- Carolyn Tweedle
- Samuel Vincent
- Mark Weatherly
- Peter Wilds
- Alec Willows
- Dale Wilson

== Development ==
On November 7, 1988, HBO aired an animated television special titled Madeline. The teleplay was an adaptation of the first book written by Ludwig Bemelmans. The later series was written by Judy Rothman who would become a writer, story editor, and lyricist for nearly all subsequent Madeline animated projects. The special was produced by DIC Enterprises and CINAR (both now part of WildBrain). The special featured Christopher Plummer as the narrator, and featured original music and songs by veteran Sesame Street songwriter and composer Joe Raposo with lyrics by Rothman and Howard Ashman. The cast for all six specials is as follows:

- Marsha Moreau as Madeline
- Judith Orban as Miss Clavel
- Julian Bailey as Pepito
- Anik Matern as Chloe
- Liz MacRae as Danielle
- Sonja Ball as Nicole

The special was nominated for a Primetime Emmy Award for Outstanding Animated Program (One Hour or Less). In 1990, the special was released onto VHS by Hi-Tops Video. The success of the special led to CINAR and France Animation producing an additional five specials, all adapted by Rothman from the other five original books, for The Family Channel. The cast of the original special and Plummer all returned for the subsequent specials. These specials featured music by Jeffrey Zahn, who replaced Raposo after he died in 1989. The theme song from the original special, "I'm Madeline", was reprised in each of the subsequent specials. The specials were released on video by Golden Book Video and Cinar/Sony Wonder in Canada.

With the success of the specials, The Family Channel commissioned a television series by DIC, which had been involved in the first of the six specials. The first season aired a total of 20 produced episodes from 1993 to 1994. Christopher Plummer reprised his role as the narrator, but most of the voice actors from the specials were replaced. In addition, however, the series featured only one song per episode (a few of them with a reprise/finale) written by various legendary songwriters, composers, and lyricists, in addition to the opening theme "I'm Madeline".

In 1995, an additional 13 episodes were produced by DIC for ABC under the title The New Adventures of Madeline. A new theme song, called "Hats Off to Madeline", was used as the new opening theme, with the music by Andy Street and lyrics by Judy Rothman; some early airings of those episodes featured "I'm Madeline", but sung by the new voice cast. Most of the voices of the child characters were replaced, with Andrea Libman assuming the title role, while Plummer, Louise Vallance, and French Tickner returned from the voice cast.

Shortly after its airing on ABC, both the network and DIC were acquired by The Walt Disney Company. The 39 produced episodes and specials began to air in reruns on the Playhouse Disney block of Disney Channel. In April 1998, DIC launched a direct-to-video division that produced films for Disney and distributed worldwide through Buena Vista Home Entertainment. The first film produced for this division, Madeline: Lost in Paris, was released in August 1999. Most of the cast members from the 1995 iteration returned with Lauren Bacall and Jason Alexander also voicing new roles. DIC afterwards produced 26 new episodes for Playhouse Disney. Christopher Gaze replaced Plummer as the show's narrator due to DIC refusing to work with the AFTRA union. The show won a Daytime Emmy Award for Outstanding Children's Animated Program.

Two more films followed: My Fair Madeline, which aired on Nickelodeon in November 2002 as part of the DIC Movie Toons series, and Madeline in Tahiti in 2005.

Madeline has continued to be shown in syndication. In the 2006–2007 season, the series was shown on CBS' KOL Secret Slumber Party Saturday morning block. Qubo also aired reruns of the series from October 6, 2018 to February 22, 2021. The series was also included in the On-Demand section of Sprout from 2015 to 2017, when the channel was rebranded to Universal Kids. As of September 2019, all broadcast and home video rights of Madeline are owned by WildBrain.

== Episodes ==
Season	Episodes	Originally released		
Season	Episodes	First released	Last released	Network
Specials	6	November 7, 1988		HBO
Specials	6	November 22, 1990	October 9, 1991	Global / Family Channel / FR3
1	20	September 12, 1993	January 23, 1994	The Family Channel
2	13	September 9, 1995	December 2, 1995	ABC
3	26	September 8, 2000	February 28, 2001	Playhouse Disney
Films	3	August 3, 1999	June 6, 2007	Direct-to-video

=== Television specials (1988–1991) ===
No.	Title	Written by	Original release date
1	Madeline	Judy Rothman	November 7, 1988 (U.S.); January 4, 1992 (Can.)
2	Madeline's Christmas	Stephan Martiniere and Peter Landecker	November 22, 1990 (U.S.); December 21, 1990 (Can.)
3	Madeline and the Bad Hat	Stephan Martiniere and Peter Landecker	March 7, 1991 (U.S.); April 7, 1991 (Can.)
4	Madeline's Rescue	Stephan Martiniere and Peter Landecker	June 6, 1991 (U.S.); June 1, 1991 (Can.)
5	Madeline and the Gypsies	Stephan Martiniere and Peter Landecker	October 14, 1991 (U.S.); August 2, 1991 (Can.)
6	Madeline in London	Stephan Martiniere and Peter Landecker	November 28, 1991 (U.S.); October 9, 1991 (Can.)

=== Season 1 (1993–1994) ===
No. overall	No. in season	Title	Written by	Original release date
1	1	"Madeline and the Forty Thieves"	Martha Moran	September 19, 1993
2	2	"Madeline and the Dog Show"	Betty Birney	September 12, 1993
3	3	"Madeline and the Easter Bonnet"	Betty Birney	September 26, 1993
4	4	"Madeline and the New House"	Story by : Judy Rothman; Teleplay by : Martha Moran	October 3, 1993
5	5	"Madeline and the Soccer Star"	Sandra Ryan	October 10, 1993
6	6	"Madeline and the Toy Factory"	Janice Sonski	October 17, 1993
7	7	"Madeline at Cooking School"	Susan Amerikaner	October 24, 1993
8	8	"Madeline at the Ballet"	Betty Birney	October 31, 1993
9	9	"Madeline and the Singing Dog"	Shelly Bennett	November 7, 1993
10	10	"Madeline's Winter Vacation"	Susan Amerikaner	November 14, 1993
11	11	"Madeline in Hollywood"	Rowby Goren	November 21, 1993
12	12	"Madeline and the Pirates"	Betty Birney	November 28, 1993
13	13	"Madeline's Birthday at the Zoo"	Shelley Bennett	December 5, 1993
14	14	"Madeline at the Louvre"	Judy Rothman	December 12, 1993
15	15	"Madeline and the Missing Clown"	Katie Shelly	December 19, 1993
16	16	"Madeline and the Costume Party"	Martha Moran	December 26, 1993
17	17	"Madeline and the Old Violin"	Betty Birney	January 2, 1994
18	18	"Madeline and the Mean, Nasty, Horrible Hats"	Story by : Judy Rothman; Teleplay by : Shelley Bennett	January 9, 1994
19	19	"Madeline and the Talking Parrot"	Story by : Susan Amerikaner; Teleplay by : Katie Shelly	January 16, 1994
20	20	"Madeline in New York"	Judy Rothman	January 23, 1994

=== Season 2 (1995) ===
No. overall	No. in season	Title	Written by	Original release date
21	1	"Madeline and the Lost Crown"	Susan Amerikaner and Judy Rothman Rofé	September 9, 1995
22	2	"Madeline on the Orient Express"	Shelley Bennett and Judy Rothman Rofé	September 16, 1995
23	3	"Madeline and the Dinosaur Bone"	Judy Rothman Rofé	September 23, 1995
24	4	"Madeline and the Magic Carpet"	Katie Shelly	September 30, 1995
25	5	"Madeline and the Treasure Hunt"	Betty G. Birney	October 7, 1995
26	6	"Madeline and the Mummy"	Libby Hinson	October 14, 1995
27	7	"Madeline's Detective School"	Diane M. Fresco	October 21, 1995
28	8	"Madeline and The Hunchback of Notre Dame"	Judy Rothman Rofé and Shelley Bennett	October 28, 1995
29	9	"Madeline and the Big Cheese"	Story by : Judy Rothman Rofé; Teleplay by : Betty G. Birney	November 4, 1995
30	10	"Madeline and the Science Project"	Susan Amerikaner	November 11, 1995
31	11	"Madeline and the Haunted Castle"	Martha Moran	November 18, 1995
32	12	"Madeline and the Wild West"	Judy Rothman Rofé	November 25, 1995
33	13	"Madeline's Holiday with Mr. Grump"	Stan Phillips and Judy Rothman Rofé	December 2, 1995

=== Season 3 (2000–2001) ===
No. overall	No. in season	Title	Written by	Original release date
34	1	"Madeline at the Hotel Riche"	Betty G. Birney	September 8, 2000
35	2	"Madeline's Halloween"	Betty G. Birney	September 15, 2000
36	3	"Madeline and the Spider Lady"	Diane Fresco	September 22, 2000
37	4	"Madeline and the Can Can Cliques"	Shelley Zellman	September 29, 2000
38	5	"Madeline at Cannes"	Shelley Zellman	October 6, 2000
39	6	"Madeline and the Show Off"	Betty G. Birney	October 13, 2000
40	7	"Madeline and the Wedding"	Story by : Susan Amerikaner and Judy Rothman Rofé; Teleplay by : Susan Amerikaner	October 20, 2000
41	8	"Madeline on Safari"	Story by : Judy Rothman Rofé; Teleplay by : Judy Rothman Rofé and Betty G. Birney	October 27, 2000
42	9	"Madeline and the North Pole"	Story by : Judy Rothman Rofé; Teleplay by : Judy Rothman Rofé and Betty G. Birney	November 3, 2000
43	10	"Madeline and Santa"	Martha Moran	November 10, 2000
44	11	"Madeline and the New Girl"	Betty G. Birney	November 17, 2000
45	12	"Madeline at Versailles"	Shelley Zellman	November 24, 2000
46	13	"Madeline on Stage"	Betty G. Birney	December 1, 2000
47	14	"Madeline and the Marionettes"	Diane Fresco	December 8, 2000
48	15	"Madeline and the Ice Skates"	Martha Moran and Jim Ryan	December 15, 2000
49	16	"Madeline and the Giants"	Betty G. Birney	December 23, 2000
50	17	"Madeline and the Fashion Show"	Judy Rothman Rofé	December 30, 2000
51	18	"Madeline's Manners"	Susan Amerikaner	January 3, 2001
52	19	"Madeline and the Magic Show"	Story by : Anthony Kant and Sandy Kopitopoulos; Teleplay by : Anthony Kant, Sandy Kopitopoulos and Susan Amerikaner	January 10, 2001
53	20	"Madeline's Valentine"	Martha Moran	January 17, 2001
54	21	"Madeline and the Perfume Factory"	Shelley Zellman	January 24, 2001
55	22	"Madeline at the Eiffel Tower"	Shelley Zellman	January 31, 2001
56	23	"Madeline and the Tea Party"	Susan Amerikaner	February 7, 2001
57	24	"Madeline and the Dog Who Cried Wolf"	Susan Amerikaner	February 14, 2001
58	25	"Madeline and the White Lie"	Cambria Gordon	February 21, 2001
59	26	"Madeline at the Flea Market"	Story by : Diane Fresco; Teleplay by : Diane Fresco and Shelley Zellman	February 28, 2001

=== Films (1999–2007) ===
==== Madeline: Lost in Paris (1999) ====
On August 3, 1999, Buena Vista Home Video through Walt Disney Home Video released the feature-length film Madeline: Lost in Paris, featuring Madeline being drawn into a scam by her supposed "Uncle" Horst and finding the true meaning of the word "family". As with Season 2 and eventually Season 3 of the series, Andrea Libman reprised her role as Madeline.

The film was later re-released on DVD on April 3, 2010, by Shout! Factory.

==== My Fair Madeline (2002) ====
In 2002, as a part of the DIC Movie Toons series of television films, DIC produced a film, titled My Fair Madeline, where Madeline is falsely accused of misbehavior on a trip to the Louvre and is sent to a London Finishing School, while attempting to foil the plot of two thieves. The voice cast was almost entirely replaced for the film, with Chantal Strand voicing Madeline and Whoopi Goldberg as Miss Clavel.

The film was originally aired on November 17, 2002, on Nickelodeon and was later released onto VHS and DVD by MGM Home Entertainment, followed on with international airings on Disney Channel, Toon Disney and Playhouse Disney.

==== Madeline in Tahiti (2007) ====
In 2005, DIC produced another film, titled Madeline in Tahiti, which is the final Madeline production to have been created. The film features Madeline and her friends going on a vacation to Tahiti to stop Miss Clavel from retiring, with Pepito sneaking along, as well as stopping a villainous plot to erupt the Tahiti-nui volcano. Chantal Strand reprised her role as Madeline while other characters were recast or reprised their roles from My Fair Madeline; most notably, Ashleigh Ball voiced both Danielle and Nona.

The film was originally going to be released on DVD in the United States by Walt Disney Home Entertainment in 2006, but this release never saw the light of the day. It was, however, released on DVD in some regions in June 2007 through other distributors, and was eventually released in the United States on iTunes and Amazon Video in 2015 and YouTube in 2019.

== Home media releases ==
The 1993 series was originally released by Golden Book Video on all single VHS volumes, and Sony Wonder on both VHS and DVD. The DVD versions contained 2 episodes each, sometimes with the original specials. The 2000 series was released by Lions Gate Home Entertainment and Trimark Home Video in 2001 and 2002 on all VHS and DVD sets. In these DVD sets, the theme song was changed to a different song titled "Our Madeline" to match the Sing-a-Long versions. In 2008, 20th Century Fox Home Entertainment released 2 DVDs titled "Next Stop, America" and "Meet Me in Paris", each containing 3 episodes. In 2010, Shout! Factory released 5 single-disc collections of the series.

In September 2013, Mill Creek Entertainment released 3 single disc collections featuring content from the animated series as well as the original TV specials. "The New Adventures of Madeline - Adventures in Paris" contains 6 episodes from the 2000 series, while "Madeline's Merry Musical Melodies" features various musical interludes from the animated series. "Bonjour Madeline" contains all 6 original TV specials. Later in May 2014, Mill Creek re-released the three single disc collections together in one three-pack set, followed by "Madeline: The Complete Collection" on DVD in Region 1 for the first time in August 2015. This six-disc collection features all six original specials produced by DIC Entertainment and CINAR between 1988 and 1991, as well as all 59 episodes from the "Madeline" TV series (1993, 1995, 2000–2001).

DVD/VHS name	Episodes	Distributor	Release date
Madeline Manners	"Madeline's Manners" "Madeline and the Show Off" "Madeline's Sing-a-Long" (DVD only)	Lions Gate Home Entertainment; Trimark Home Video	September 25, 2001
Madeline's Halloween Spooktacular (VHS only)	"Madeline's Halloween" "Madeline and the Spider Lady"	Lions Gate Home Entertainment; Trimark Home Video	September 25, 2001
Madeline's Sing-a-Long (VHS only)	"Madeline's Sing-a-Long"	Lions Gate Home Entertainment; Trimark Home Video	September 25, 2001
Madeline at the North Pole	"Madeline at the North Pole" "Madeline and Santa" "Madeline and the Ice Skates" (DVD only)	Lions Gate Home Entertainment; Trimark Home Video	October 16, 2001
Madeline's Best Manners	"Madeline's Manners" "Madeline and the Show Off" "Madeline and the Ice Skates" "Madeline and the Tea Party"	Lions Gate Home Entertainment; Trimark Home Video	March 26, 2002
Madeline at the Eiffel Tower	"Madeline at the Eiffel Tower" "Madeline at Versailles" "Madeline and the White Lie" (DVD only)	Lions Gate Home Entertainment; Trimark Home Video	March 26, 2002
Sing-a-Long Around the World with Madeline	"Sing-a-Long Around the World with Madeline" "Madeline's Sing-a-Long" (DVD only)	Lions Gate Home Entertainment; Trimark Home Video	March 26, 2002
Madeline – Volume 1	"Madeline and the Ballet" "Madeline in New York"	Sony Wonder/Classic Media	May 28, 2002
Madeline – Volume 2	"Madeline and the 40 Thieves" "Madeline and the New House"	Sony Wonder/Classic Media	May 28, 2002
Madeline's Winter Vacation	"Madeline's Winter Vacation" "Madeline in London"	Sony Wonder/Classic Media	September 24, 2002
Madeline's Christmas	"Madeline's Christmas" "Madeline and the Toy Factory"	Sony Wonder/Classic Media	September 24, 2002
Madeline's Easter	"Madeline and the Easter Bonnet" "Madeline and the Bad Hat"	Sony Wonder/Classic Media	February 11, 2003
Madeline the Star	"Madeline in Hollywood" "Madeline and the Soccer Star"	Sony Wonder/Classic Media	February 11, 2003
Madeline's Dog Stories	"Madeline and the Dog Show" "Madeline's Rescue"	Sony Wonder/Classic Media	June 3, 2003
Madeline's Adventures	"Madeline and the Pirates" "Madeline and the Gypsies"	Sony Wonder/Classic Media	June 3, 2003
Madeline – Meet Me in Paris	"Madeline at the Eiffel Tower" "Madeline at the Louvre" "Madeline at Cannes"	20th Century Fox Home Entertainment	February 11, 2008
Madeline – Next Stop, America	"Madeline in New York" "Madeline in Hollywood" "Madeline in the Wild West"	20th Century Fox Home Entertainment	February 11, 2008
Madeline's Great Adventures	"Madeline and the Magic Carpet" "Madeline on Safari" "Madeline and the Lost Crown" "Madeline and the Gypsies" "Madeline and the Pirates" "Madeline and the Forty Thieves"	Shout! Factory	June 29, 2010
Madeline's Halloween and other Spooky Tales	"Madeline's Halloween" "Madeline and the Mean, Nasty, Horrible Hats" "Madeline and the Mummy" "Madeline And The Haunted Castle" "Madeline And The Spider Lady"	Shout! Factory	August 17, 2010
Madeline's Christmas and other Wintery Tales	"Madeline's Winter Vacation" "Madeline and Santa" "Madeline at the North Pole" "Madeline's Holiday with Mr. Grump" "Madeline and the Ice Skates"	Shout! Factory	October 19, 2010
Madeline on the Town	"Madeline and the Wedding" "Madeline on Stage" "Madeline and the Fashion Show" "Madeline at the Ballet" "Madeline at the Costume Party" "Madeline’s Birthday at the Zoo"	Shout! Factory	March 8, 2011
Madeline and her Friends	"Madeline and the Soccer Star" "Madeline and the Singing Dog" "Madeline and the Missing Clown" "Madeline and the Talking Parrot" "Madeline and the Big Cheese" "Madeline’s Rescue"	Shout! Factory	June 7, 2011
Bonjour Madeline – The Original Specials	"Madeline" "Madeline's Christmas" "Madeline's Rescue" "Madeline and the Bad Hat" "Madeline and the Gypsies" "Madeline in London"	Mill Creek Entertainment	September 10, 2013
The New Adventures of Madeline – Adventures in Paris	"Madeline and the Marionettes" "Madeline and the Ice Skates" "Madeline and the Can Can Cliques" "Madeline and the Fashion Show" "Madeline at the Eiffel Tower" "Madeline and the Perfume Factory"	Mill Creek Entertainment	September 10, 2013
Madeline's Merry Musical Melodies	"Sing-a-Long Around the World with Madeline" "Madeline's Sing-a-Long"	Mill Creek Entertainment	September 10, 2013
Madeline – The Complete Collection	All 59 episodes and 6 specials	Mill Creek Entertainment	August 4, 2015

=== Sing-a-Longs ===
In 2001, DIC produced two direct-to-video releases which featured songs and clips from season 3 of the television series akin to Disney's Sing-Along Songs series, which were titled "Sing-a-Long with Madeline and her Friends" and "Sing-a-Long Around the World with Madeline".

They were originally released by Lions Gate Home Entertainment and Trimark Home Video on September 25, 2001, and March 25, 2002, respectively, and later reissued together by Mill Creek Entertainment as "Madeline's Merry Musical Melodies" on September 10, 2013, as well as being available for digital download.
