= List of Strawberry Shortcake (TV series) episodes =

Strawberry Shortcake is an American children's direct-to-video animated series produced by DIC Entertainment and American Greetings based on the franchise of the same name that debuted in March 2003. The series consists of 45 episodes, plus one short and one film. Part of the series was broadcast on television including by CBS, HBO, and HBO Family, and in broadcast syndication. The entire cast is replaced with younger and lesser known voice actors compared to the 1980s Strawberry Shortcake animated specials.

Following the series' reboot in 2009, the 2003 series was succeeded by Strawberry Shortcake's Berry Bitty Adventures in 2010.

== Series overview ==
Season	Episodes	Originally released	
Season	Episodes	First released	Last released
1	4	March 11, 2003	October 14, 2003
2	6	August 31, 2004	October 18, 2005
3	5	February 7, 2006	October 2, 2007
4	7	March 4, 2008	March 6, 2012

== Episodes ==
=== Season 1 (2003) ===
All the episodes in this season are single 45-minute episodes. When the episodes are broadcast on television, they are either edited to 22 minutes or are presented as a two-parter.

The intro sequence uses clips from "Meet Strawberry Shortcake", as well as the "Knock Knock, Who's There" music video.

No. overall	No. in season	Title	Songs	Original release date
1	1	"Meet Strawberry Shortcake"	"The Cookie Song", "Friendship Grows", "A Berry Happy Birthday", "Strawberry Girl in a Strawberry World"	March 11, 2003
Strawberry Shortcake, Custard, and Pupcake set off on an adventure to find party supplies for Strawberry's little sister, Apple Dumplin's first birthday. Along the way, Strawberry meets some brand new friends, who present her with the gifts she needs.
2	2	"Berry Merry Christmas"	"Call Me Santa", "Holidayland (A Place Full of Joy)", "Hello-Ho-Ho", "The Gift of Friendship"	October 14, 2003
Strawberry Shortcake wants to do something special for her friends during the Christmas holidays. She and Honey Pie Pony venture to a magical place called Holiday Land, where Strawberry tries to find the perfect presents for her friends.
3	3	"Spring for Strawberry Shortcake"	"Springtime", "Work Together", "Jammin'", "I Put the Zing in Spring"	March 11, 2003
It is the first day of spring in Strawberryland, but it is still snowing outside, and does not feel like it is spring at all. Strawberry Shortcake, Ginger Snap, and Orange Blossom go on an adventure to see where Spring has gone. Meanwhile, Huckleberry Pie and Custard learn the importance of doing the jobs.
4	4	"Strawberry Shortcake's Get Well Adventure"	"Have a Good Trip", "That's Imagination", "The Gettin' Better Boogie Woogie", "It's All How You Look at It"	October 14, 2003
4	4	"Strawberry Shortcake's Horse Tales"	"Have a Good Trip", "That's Imagination", "The Gettin' Better Boogie Woogie", "It's All How You Look at It"	October 14, 2003
While going on her big adventure, Honey Pie Pony hurts her leg, so she has to stay at Strawberry's house until her leg is better, and is getting impatient. Strawberry and her friends start telling stories to pass the time and show her that being at home is not so bad.

=== Season 2 (2004–05) ===
Beginning with this season, two episodes are featured in a "compilation" format, in which Strawberry recounts the featured adventures using her "remembering book". Most TV airings, however, separate the segments as single 22-minute length episodes.

Anna Jordan replaces Sarah Koslosky as Custard the Cat's voice, while James Street replaces Daniel Canfield as Huckleberry Pie's voice.

The intro was also changed, which includes clips from "Best Pets Yet" and "Growing Better All the Time".

No. overall	No. in season	Title	Songs	Original release date
5	1	"Best Pets Yet"	"I Love Custard" and "That Doggone Dog" "The Best Pet Yet" and "You're My Berry Best Friend"	August 31, 2004
Here Comes Pupcake: Strawberry finds and cares for a stray puppy during a storm, who she names "Pupcake". Custard gets jealous of this new family addition as she expected that Strawberry would have her "Me and Custard" day and is afraid that now she won't have one because of it. When Strawberry is not looking, she attempts to chase away Pupcake, but they soon get lost. Custard soon realizes how useful Pupcake really is when he finds a way to help Strawberry and her friends know where they are. Peppermint's Pet Peeve: Strawberry holds a "Best Pets" competition for her friends' pets, and convinces Peppermint Fizz and her pet, Cola Chameleon to join. The two, however, end up resorting to cheating and winning every event, not knowing that the best part of a Pet competition is about having fun and not thinking about wanting to win.
6	2	"Adventures on Ice Cream Island"	"Prancing Paradise" and "Back Together" "My Gift Horse Gift" and "Festival of the Fillies"	August 31, 2004
Horse of a Different Color: Honey Pie Pony is sad because she gets left out of every game for having four legs. Strawberry and her friends take her to Ice Cream Island, a place where horses like Honey Pie can roam away without any issue. When Honey Pie considers staying on Ice Cream Island for good, Strawberry must convince her that Strawberryland is her true home. Festival of the Fillies: The Ponies on Ice Cream Island allow Honey Pie to take part in their annual Horse Festival. The festival is threatened when a traveling showman named Licorice Whip kidnaps Honey Pie for his show, and it is up to the kids and their new filly friends to stop him.
7	3	"Play Day Surprise"	"Fun for Fun's Sake" and "Be a Good Sport" "Waiting for the Fun" and "Giving It Your All"	February 15, 2005
Angel Cake in the Outfield: Angel Cake wants everything to go her way and gets upset whenever she loses at games, making her a bad sport. Apple Dumplin' shows her that she can be a good sport if she thinks more about the fun she can have when playing games. Win Some, Lose Some: It is the day of the nearly-once-a-yearly Strawberryland Games, and Peppermint Fizz is determined to cheat in every race so she can win them all. It is not until Apple Dumplin's carefree nature in enjoying the fun soon makes Peppermint regret her actions.
8	4	"Seaberry Beach Party"	"Seaberry Shore" and "Seaberry Shore and More" "It's Wonder Time" and "I'll Treasure You"	February 15, 2005
The Mystery of Seaberry Beach: Strawberry Shortcake, Blueberry Muffin, and Rainbow Sherbet visit Strawberry's friend, Coco Calypso. They help to solve a mystery when Coco's seaberries get stolen. Legend of the Lost Treasure: On a day at the Seaberry Shore, the girls, and their new friend Seaberry Delight imagine themselves as mermaids, going on a big adventure to find golden Sand Dollars which are Blueberry and Rainbow horde. When the girls encounter a greedy sea beast who also wants the treasure, Strawberry teaches them about sharing.
9	5	"Moonlight Mysteries"	"An Itty Bitty Scare" and "Scaredy Little Me" "Chasin' the Boos Away" and "Never Be Afraid to Make Friends"	August 30, 2005
Ginger Snap's No-Light Night of Fright: When Strawberry and her friends go camping to celebrate the end of summer, Ginger Snap is afraid to tell anyone that she is afraid of the dark, fearing that she might be the only one who is afraid. The Blueberry Beast: When Strawberry and her friends discover a spooky-looking house, they think about the things that could live there, and fear for their lives. They soon discover that something lives in the house but it is not at all scary and soon they find a new friend.
10	6	"Dress Up Days"	"If I Glittered" and "Beautiful You" "I Can Be" and "Not Like Me"	October 18, 2005
The Play's the Thing: When a rainy day leaves everyone inside Blueberry Muffin's house, Strawberry Shortcake and her friends decide to hold a play based on the tale of Cinderella. Strawberry gets uncertain about using her worn-out raincoat as a costume, unsure if her friends would think otherwise. The Costume Party: A new friend, Rainbow Sherbet, has moved into Strawberryland. Peppermint Fizz is uncomfortable about her differences, but Strawberry solves the issue by holding a costume party where everyone dresses in the same costumes, showcasing the message to Peppermint that being the same can be boring.

=== Season 3 (2006–07) ===
For the third season, the show transitions off to the "A World of Friends" format that the new toyline from Playmates Toys features.

Another new intro sequence is made, featuring clips from "World of Friends".

No. overall	No. in season	Title	Songs	Original release date
11	1	"World of Friends"	"Join the Club" and "My Friend, Mon Amie" "The Friendship Tour" and "How Do You Make a Friendship Cake?"	February 7, 2006
The Friendship Club: Strawberry, Custard, and Pupcake travel to Pearis and meet Crepes Suzette and her pet Eclaire after she receives one of Strawberry's friendship letters. Trouble then occurs when Pupcake accidentally trashed Crepe's fashion shop and all the pets run away. They have to get back Eclaire from an on-the-run Dog Catcher. A Festival of Friends: Strawberry holds a Great Friendship Festival in Strawberryland, but things do not go according to plan when Tea Blossom and Strawberry have trouble being honest about their differences and Angel Cake's rejection for any help causes her Friendship Cake to go wrong.
12	2	"Berry Fairy Tales"	"Merry Berry Fairy" and "That Makes You Beautiful" "Ev'rything I Touch" and "The Legend of Sherry Bobbleberry"	August 22, 2006
When the Berry Fairy Came to Stay: A fairy named Margalo takes advantage of Strawberry's kind and friendly nature, and becomes very lazy when she makes Strawberry do all her work. The Legend of Sherry Bobbleberry: Strawberry and her friend Ginger Snap help a Fairy named Sherry Bobbleberry, who wants to be promoted to the Fairy Princess First Class, but fears her clumsiness won't get her promoted.
13	3	"Cooking Up Fun"	"I'm Not Too Little" and "Big Like Me" "Recipe for Fame" and "The Right Ingredients"	November 14, 2006
Baby Takes the Cake: After causing a mess from cooking with Strawberry and her friends and not being allowed to help out for being too young, Apple Dumplin' has a dream where she is a big kid, but all her friends are babies like her. Piece of Cake: Ginger Snap invents a form of television called "Berryvision", and Honey Pie Pony suggests the idea that Strawberry and her friends should hold a Cooking Show. Orange Blossom, however, is too shy to be on camera, and when everybody leaves in anger after their dishes get ruined, Orange must find a way to keep the show moving forward.
14	4	"Berry Blossom Festival"	"Man Oh Man Oh Manners" and "Pass the Fun" "The Berry Blossom Festival" and "Make Some Noise"	May 1, 2007 (Note: First released theatrically as part of the Kidtoon Films program on March 13, 2007, and first released on DVD and VCD in Singapore and Malaysia in late-April 2007.)
Mind Your Manners: Strawberry Shortcake decides to hold a Berry Blossom Festival, yet Raspberry Torte dislikes the good manners that the girls are having while preparing for the Festival. Queen for a Day: In order to steal the Berry Blossom Festival Crown, the Purple Pieman fakes the answers in a quiz that pits Sour Grapes against Strawberry for the award of Berry Blossom Queen.
15	5	"Let's Dance"	"Get the Moves" and "Let's Dance" "Shortcake Swing" and "A True Friend"	October 2, 2007 (Note: First released theatrically as part of the Kidtoon Films program on September 1, 2007.)
Everybody Dance (Dancin' in Disguise): Sour Grapes distracts the girls with dance lessons while the Purple Pieman loots the strawberry fields, only for Sour to enjoy the girls' dancing and reconsider herself. Let's Dance (Meet Apricot): It is a snowy, cold day, and the pond freezes over. Strawberry and her friends decide to Ice Skate, but a new girl, Apricot, lies about being good at it. Note 1: Although produced as part of Season 3 and featuring the pre-2007 designs, it was released as part of the fourth season. The DVD was later reissued in the United States in 2008 to match the covers of the other Season 4 DVDs. Note 2: This episode takes place before the events of Big Country Fun.

=== Season 4 (2008–12) ===
Taking place after the events of Let's Dance, the fourth season gives out a change to the artwork style. The aging of the characters was changed to give the impression that the characters had become teenagers (or for Apple Dumplin', a child). The aging of the characters was further backed by the fact that Strawberry Shortcake is seen applying for a job and later driving a car in Big Country Fun and Berry Big Journeys.

Honey Pie and the other fillies were relegated to the role of background characters, with the character of Honey Pie Pony not having spoken since Let's Dance. She is implied to have moved to Ice Cream Island permanently in the book The Friendship Trip, which featured the Year 4 characters, explaining why she appeared less in the series for the season.

During this season, many of the separate 22-minute segments have aired earlier internationally than in the United States. The series was exclusively released direct-to-video in the country.

The intro sequence is changed yet again, this time featuring especially-made footage.

No. overall	No. in season	Title	Songs	Original release date
16	1	"Big Country Fun"	"Down on the Ranch" and "Giddy Up" "The Best Place Ever" and "Welcome to the Country Fair"	March 4, 2008
Back in the Saddle: Strawberry Shortcake and Angel Cake are hired to work at the dude ranch with some new friends, including the clumsy-prone Plum Puddin'. Things get a bit difficult when Strawberry and Angel Cake become competitive, making the whole job complicated indeed when everyone gets lost. Down on the Farm: Caramel Corn's farm is in trouble. Her animals are running away and she is close to going out of business. Strawberry comes to the rescue and finds out the Purple Pieman is behind the plot, by kidnapping the animals so he can purchase the farm and replace it with a theme park.
17	2	"Rockaberry Roll"	"Why Can't I?" and "All Together Now" "You Can't Not Try" and "Hope You Like It"	August 12, 2008 (Note: "It Takes Talent" and "Playing to Beat the Band" originally aired on Disney Channel Asia on January 7 to 8, 2008, respectively, and later on in Europe. The DVD was originally released in South Africa on March 10.)
It Takes Talent: Strawberry and her friends form a band called "Strawberry Jams", but they focus too much on their own instruments that it does not make something that sounds musical and the band almost drops out of the talent show. Playing to Beat the Band: When Ginger Snap is away, Peppermint Fizz decides to fill in for Strawberry Jams since she wants to become better friends with Strawberry Shortcake, but she is a beginner with the instrument she is playing and won't practice.
18	3	"Happily Ever After"	"Pretty on the Inside" and "If We Take the Time to Listen" "The Real Me" and "A Princess Like That"	February 9, 2009 (Note: The DVD was first released in South Africa in mid-2008. "Sleeping Beauty" and "A Princess named Rap" first aired on TV on Tiny Pop in the UK in August, and later on Disney Channel Asia on September 8 and 9, respectively.)
Sleeping Beauty: When the Brambleberry Fairy (Angel Cake) causes a problem that makes Princess Strawberry Rose (Strawberry Shortcake) fall asleep for hundreds of years, she realizes that she needs to find a way to reverse the problem. A Princess Named Rap: Princess Rapunzel (Rainbow Sherbet)'s parents hire a teacher named Professor Grapes (Sour Grapes) to teach her the traditional ways to be willing and royal, but she is not too pleased when Rap befriends two children (Maid Strawberry and Squire Huckleberry) who are willing to make her "Un-royal", so Professor Grapes plots revenge.
19	4	"Berry Big Journeys"	"A Little Bump in the Road" and "Getting There is All the Fun" "Sailing Toward Tomorrow" and "Home is Love"	March 31, 2009 (Note: "Strawberry's Big Journey" and "Around the Berry Big World" originally aired on Disney Channel Asia on March 14 to April 30, 2008, respectively. The DVD itself was first released in South Africa on April 2.)
Strawberry's Big Journey: Strawberry and her friends go on a journey in order to see a flower that only blooms every ten years. Along the way, they meet a new friend. Around the Berry Big World: Strawberry accepts a challenge from the Purple Pieman to go around the world in 80 days.
20	5	"Berrywood, Here We Come!"	"Me, Me, Me!" and "Everyone's a Star" "Let's Talk It Out" and "How Could I Ever Forget"	August 31, 2010 (Note: The DVD was first released in South Africa in mid-2008. "Hurray for Berrywood!" and "Lights... Camera..." first aired on TV on Tiny Pop in the UK in August, and later on Disney Channel Asia on September 10 to 11, respectively.)
Hooray for Berrywood: Strawberry and her friends travel to Berrywood to visit her old childhood friend Lime Light to help with her brand new movie. Lime Light, however, is a diva in the making and is so self-centred that she blames her own problems on others and won't accept her own responsibility. When the movie threatens to shut down production, Strawberry has to make Limelight see that it is not all about her and to think of others before it is too late. Lights... Camera...: Strawberry and her friends attempt to get a movie theatre back in business when it is on the brink of selling, but when the Purple Pieman, who wants to turn the building into a Pie Shop catches on, he plots another rotten scheme to ensure he gets the theatre instead. This almost causes victory when the plan results in Angel Cake and Blueberry Muffin falling out. Fortunately, Strawberry and Orange Blossom help the two friends get back together again and soon learn that the best way to work together and solve a problem is to talk it out sensibly, which they must use to finally show the Purple Pieman the error of his ways and get the theatre back up and running together. Note: This is the first and only episode where Caroline Iliff voices Blueberry Muffin replacing Bianca Heyward.
21	6	"Growing Up Dreams"	"A Step at a Time" and "Don't Stop Now" "The Thing You Want to Be" and "When We're All Grown Up"	August 30, 2011 (Note: The DVD was first released in South Africa on April 2, 2008. "One Small Step" and "The Good Mayor" first aired on TV on Disney Channel Asia on May 1st and 2nd the same year, respectively.)
One Small Step: While talking about their futures, Ginger Snap says she wants to be an astronaut and fly into space. Although the others do not believe she will achieve this dream, Strawberry, however, encourages Ginger Snap to dream big, which she does. The Good Mayor: During a Career Fair, Strawberry and her friends pretend to do the jobs they would like to do when they grow up. Peppermint Fizz becomes a mayor and ends up being very bossy indeed.
22	7	"Berry Brick Road"	"It's in There" and "Now's the Time" "Let's Keep the Green World Green" and "That One Little Word"	March 6, 2012 (Note: The DVD was first released in South Africa on May 20, 2008. "Toto's Tale" and "Where the Gem Berries Grow" first aired on TV on Tiny Pop in the UK in August, and later on Disney Channel Asia on September 6th and 7th the same year, respectively.)
Toto's Tale: Pupcake tells his own take on The Wizard of Oz. Strawberry has whisked away to the magical world of Oz, where she must avoid the Wicked Witch (Sour Grapes) and ask the Wizard to help her get home. Where the Gem Berries Grow: The Gem Berries are disappearing due to the Berrykins' unwise feelings, and the Wicked Witch is wanting to destroy them all. It is Strawberry and her friends to the rescue.

== Specials ==
=== Promotional video (2004) ===
A 5-minute promotional video titled "Growing Better All the Time" was released as a bonus feature with Sterling Entertainment's Care Bears: Daydreams DVD in February 2004. It appears to be produced sometime between Seasons 1-2, as the song from the promo appears on the first CD, Strawberry Jams, while scenes from the promo were used in the opening credits of the second series of the show.

Title	Song	Original release date
"Growing Better All the Time"	"Growing Better All the Time"	February 4, 2004
Strawberry Shortcake and her friends find a good place to start a new garden, but the crows keep ruining the flowers. With this, she and her friends build scarecrows.

=== Film (2006) ===
Title	Original release date
"The Sweet Dreams Movie"	October 7, 2006
While having a sleepover together, Strawberry and her friends travel to the Land of Dreams on a sea-plane like boat built by Ginger Snap, where they must help stop Purple Pieman from achieving his dreams before they can.
