= Waltman =

Waltman is a surname. Notable people with the surname include:

- Bob Waltman (1933–2010), American politician and businessman
- Danny Waltman (born 1981), American soccer player
- Kjell Waltman (1758–1799), Swedish actor
- Mary Waltman, American actress
- Michael Waltman (1946–2011), American actor
- Retief Waltman (born 1938/39), South African golfer and Christian missionary
- Royce Waltman (1942–2014), American college basketball coach
- Sean Waltman (born 1972), American podcaster and wrestler
