= Rainbow Fish (TV series) =

- Genre: Animated series
- Based on: The Rainbow Fish by Marcus Pfister
- Written by: Dean Stefan; Rowby Goren; Richard Stanley; Alan Swayze; Ian James Corlett; Brooks Wachtel; Shelley Zellman; Patti Carr; Lara Runnels; Francis Moss; S. M. Molitor; Kati Rocky; Sindy McKay; William Forrest Cluverius; Erika Strobel
- Directed by: Drew Edwards
- Voices of: Rhys Huber; Andrew Francis; Lee Tockar; Erin Fitzgerald; Chantal Strand; French Tickner; Alex Doduk; Colin Murdock; John Payne; Bill Switzer; Ellen Kennedy; Chiara Zanni; Christopher Gray; Kathleen Barr
- Theme music composer: Tom Armbruster; Charlie Brissette; Ed Mitchell; Dean Stefan
- Opening theme: "There's A Rainbow in the Water" performed by Blu Mankuma and Saffron Henderson
- Ending theme: "There's A Rainbow in the Water (Reprise)" (instrumental)
- Composer: Matthew McCauley
- Countries of origin: Canada; Germany; United States
- Original language: English
- No. of seasons: 1
- No. of episodes: 52

Production
- Executive producers: Steven DeNure; Loris Kramer; Neil Court; Franz Prinz von Auersperg
- Producer: Beth Stevenson
- Editor: Judy Kaling
- Running time: 15 minutes
- Production companies: Decode Entertainment; EM.TV & Merchandising AG; Sony Wonder

Original release
- Network: Teletoon (Canada); ZDF (Germany); HBO Family (US)
- Release: January 8 – December 24, 2000

Rainbow Fish is a children's animated television series adapted from the book of the same name by Marcus Pfister. However, the television series does not follow the plot of the book; instead, it takes the character and the setting to create new stories. For the show's purposes, some characters were added and others were expanded. In the series, the fish live in a place called Neptune Bay (named after Neptune, the god of the sea), and attend "The School of Fish". The series also features a location called "Shipwreck Park", resembling the wreck of the RMS Titanic.

The series was produced by Decode Entertainment and EM.TV & Merchandising AG for Sony Wonder. It originally aired for a single season of 52 episodes, from January 8 to December 24, 2000.

== Characters ==
- Rainbow Fish (also known simply as "Rainbow") (voiced by Rhys Huber) is a proud and feisty 9-year-old male fish with shiny scales, and the main character of the series. He lives with his parents, Sol and Aqua, and his 12-year-old sister, Ruby, in a cave near Shipwreck Park.
- Sea Filly the Seahorse (voiced by Chantal Strand) is a 9-year-old girl in the School of Fish. She is often seen reading books. She eventually becomes best friends with Rainbow Fish and Blue. She is friendly and has orange hair.
- Blue (voiced by Andrew Francis) is Rainbow Fish's best friend, a 9-year-old bluefish who is modest and contemplative. He has a baby sister named Turquoise. Blue is based on the small blue fish from the Rainbow Fish book series by Marcus Pfister.
- Ruby (voiced by Chiara Zanni) is Rainbow Fish's ruby-colored and bossy 12-year-old sister. She is often arrogant and self-centered. Although Ruby means well, she regularly gets Rainbow Fish into trouble because she occasionally gets jealous. Despite this, she loves him, just like their parents, Aqua and Sol.
- Aqua (voiced by Ellen Kennedy) is an aqua-colored fish and Rainbow's mother, while Sol (voiced by John Payne) is a purple-colored fish and Rainbow's father. They support their son and daughter in any way they can, always providing them with courage and love.
- Principal Gefilte (voiced by French Tickner) is the proud principal of the School of Fish, known for his strictness about behavior.
- Mrs. Chips (voiced by Ellen Kennedy) is the only teacher at the School of Fish, instructing students in art, history, mathematics, science, and literature.
- Wanda the Octopus (voiced by Kathleen Barr) is the wise owner of Neptune Bay's fast food restaurant. When Rainbow Fish and his friends are feeling down, she offers them sound advice. She is based on the Wise Octopus from the original book.
- Chomper (voiced by Christopher Gray) and Stingo (voiced by Bill Switzer) are two bullies at the School of Fish. While they don't physically harm others, they frequently bully and tease Rainbow Fish and his friends. Chomper is a shark, and Stingo is a stingray.
- Sherman Shrimp (voiced by Alex Doduk) is the smallest student at the School of Fish, and as a result, everything looks big to him.
- Sir Sword (voiced by Colin Murdock) is a local swordfish, upper-class, and somewhat of a busybody. He is sometimes grumpy, sometimes civil, and tends to think of himself as superior to others.
- Grandpa is Rainbow and Ruby's grandfather

== Episodes ==
No.	Title	Original US air date
1	"Rainbow Fish and the New Girl in School"	January 8, 2000
Sea Filly the seahorse joins the school, and Rainbow and his best friend, Blue, welcome her.
2	"Rainbow Fish Meets Wayne Grunion"	January 15, 2000
Rainbow is thrilled to meet his hero, renowned hockey star Wayne Grunion, when he comes to town.
3	"Rainbow Fish Plays the Conch Shell"	January 22, 2000
Mrs. Chips assigns Rainbow Fish the "conch shell", the hardest instrument in the band. Rainbow practices diligently in his cave, gradually improving and preparing for the school concert.
4	"Riptide"	January 29, 2000
When Rainbow Fish and his friends try a dangerous sport called "riptiding," Blue is swept away, and Sea Filly and Rainbow must find him before it's too late.
5	"Rainbow Gets an 'A'"	February 4, 2000
Rainbow Fish gets a "C" on his report card but accidentally spills a kelp gusher milkshake on it, making it look like an "A." He must prevent his parents from discovering the truth and faces consequences for lying and altering his grades.
6	"Grandpa's Fish Tales"	February 11, 2000
Rainbow initially dreads spending time with his grandpa but is captivated by an amazing story, learning that old people can be exciting.
7	"Rainbow's Dental Dilemma"	February 18, 2000
Rainbow fears visiting the dentist but learns it's not as bad as he thought.
8	"Rainbow Fish and the Pop Star"	February 25, 2000
Rainbow brags about knowing the famous pop star, Bruce Sturgeon, which leads him into trouble when he tries to make Bruce perform at school.
9	"Sherman Shrimp"	March 3, 2000
Rainbow Fish mistreats the new student, Sherman Shrimp, but after Sherman saves him from a shipwreck, Rainbow realizes he's been unfair.
10	"Lost in Crumbling Canyon"	March 10, 2000
Chomper, the school bully, and Rainbow Fish get lost in a canyon and must work together to find their way out.
11	"The Golf Lesson"	March 17, 2000
Rainbow breaks his father's golf club and scrambles to replace it before his father's big game with Sir Sword.
12	"Ruby's Adventures in Babysitting"	March 24, 2000
Ruby babysits the guppy Ferdie, claiming Rainbow is too irresponsible to help, but after Ferdie swims away, Rainbow finds him, and Ruby apologizes.
13	"Sir Sword Goes Back to School"	March 31, 2000
Sir Sword must finish third grade, so he attends Rainbow's school.
14	"Rainbow de Bergerac"	April 7, 2000
Blue is too shy to ask Goldie on a date, so Rainbow helps him by feeding him lines through a communicator, but Chomper and Stingo ruin the plan.
15	"A Big Fish on Campus"	April 14, 2000
Blue becomes a hall monitor but lets the power go to his head.
16	"A Sibling Rivalry"	April 21, 2000
Blue feels left out after getting a new baby sister who receives all the attention.
17	"One Fish's Treasure"	April 28, 2000
Rainbow lines a sea-monkey bowl with Ruby's magazine, ruining it.
18	"Project Rainbow Fish"	May 5, 2000
Rainbow learns a lesson about charity through a school project.
19	"Ruby Slips In"	May 12, 2000
Ruby starts spending time with Rainbow and his friends, and Rainbow suspects she's trying to steal his friends.
20	"A Working Fish"	May 19, 2000
Rainbow gets a job at the Candy Counter to earn money.
21	"Cecil B. de Rainbow"	May 26, 2000
Inspired by a new waterproof camera, Rainbow becomes a filmmaker and casts himself as director.
22	"Rainbow's Pen Pal"	June 2, 2000
Rainbow is excited about his pen pal's upcoming visit.
23	"Campus Current"	June 9, 2000
Sea Filly becomes the editor of the school newspaper but, in her enthusiasm, turns it into a gossip column. After publishing a false article, she learns the importance of journalistic integrity.
24	"Fish Alone"	June 16, 2000
While home alone, Rainbow watches TV, aware of burglars trying to break in. Rainbow foils their plan and becomes a hero.
25	"Rainbow Fish and the In Crowd"	June 23, 2000
Rainbow and Blue join a new clique, the High Tides, much to Sea Filly's dismay.
26	"The Knights of the Coral Table"	June 30, 2000
Sir Sword lends Rainbow a book that he becomes engrossed in and can't stop reading.
27	"Bad Luck, Ruby"	July 7, 2000
After a series of mishaps, Ruby believes she has been cursed.
28	"Father's Day"	July 14, 2000
Rainbow's class has Dads' Day at school and all students' fathers are invited to describe their own, personal jobs. Rainbow is worried, however, as he thinks his father has a boring job.
29	"A Prehistoric Pal"	July 21, 2000
Rainbow finds a hole in the ground that an extinct coelacanth called Carl swims out of. Carl spends most of his time in the modern world, trying to impress Ruby. This might be a reference to another Marcus Pfister book, called Dazzle the Dinosaur.
30	"May the Better Fish Win"	July 28, 2000
Rainbow and Blue compete for the role of class president. They both try to impress Sea Filly in order to get her vote.
31	"Blue's Fishy Catch"	August 4, 2000
Blue wins the clamball championship for his school, but only because no one sees him drop the ball anywhere.
32	"To Catch a Thief"	August 11, 2000
Rainbow is suspicious of his sister, Ruby, when she starts acting very strangely. It turns out that she is just making a surprise gift for their parents.
33	"Guess Who's Coming to Dinner"	August 18, 2000
Rainbow's mother, Aqua, invites his teacher, Mrs Chips, to dinner, and Rainbow Fish is worried that Mrs Chips herself will act just like a teacher.
34	"It's a Wonderful Fish"	August 25, 2000
One difficult day, a glowing guardian angel fish shows Rainbow Fish the value of his life.
35	"Moving Day"	September 1, 2000
Rainbow Fish fears that both his parents, Sol and Aqua, are planning to sell the cave to two fish called Ret and Snapper, and so his friends attempt to make his house as much of a wreck as possible to avoid it being sold. However, Rainbow then discovers his parents were planning to build a new recreation room.
36	"A Romantic Dinner"	September 8, 2000
Rainbow and Ruby prepare an anniversary dinner for their parents.
37	"The Bodyguard"	September 15, 2000
Rainbow saves a whale's life, and, in return, the whale becomes his bodyguard.
38	"Mom's Away"	September 22, 2000
Rainbow is not pleased when his mother, Aqua, gets a job in his school.
39	"How Sea Filly Got Her Groove Back"	September 29, 2000
After being teased by her classmates for not being feminine enough, Sea Filly decides to take up cheerleading, causing Blue and Rainbow to worry about her becoming a different person altogether.
40	"High Tide Noon"	October 6, 2000
Rainbow is embarrassed after failing to stand up to Rocko Rockfish, a bullying second-grader.
41	"A Game Girl"	October 13, 2000
After watching Rainbow and Blue play it in Shipwreck Park, Sea Filly becomes addicted to a computer game called "Clam Blaster" and hardly does anything else. When she brings the video game to the School Of Fish one day and plays it there during a difficult maths test with Mrs Chips, she soon discovers that the video game itself is "dumb, violent and intellectually worthless".
42	"There's No Business Like Show Business"	October 20, 2000
Rainbow, Blue, and Sea Filly hear the tale of two feuding crabs who were once song-and-dance partners, and then, they all set out to bring them back together, once and for all.
43	"Sea Filly Needs a Helping Fin"	October 27, 2000
Sea Filly gets a bad grade on a maths test at the School of Fish and worries greatly.
44	"Prince Blue"	November 3, 2000
When Blue looks at his book and mistakenly thinks that his ancestors were royalty, he starts acting like a prince.
45	"The Pool Shark"	November 10, 2000
When Chomper's cousin Slick, a pool-playing master, comes to Wanda's refreshment shop, he beats everyone in Pool by secretly cheating. Rainbow, unaware of this at first, is in awe, and decides to become his assistant, then discovers his secret. Rainbow then declares a match to determine that Chomper's relative is cheating. Rainbow then wins, and the other player leaves the shop forever.
46	"Halloween Under the H2O"	November 17, 2000
Rainbow tries to put Sea Filly in the Halloween spirit, but then has a haunting Halloween dream, and wakes up to find that Sea Filly has actually scared him in his sleep.
47	"An Eviction Notice"	November 24, 2000
Phineas T. Gronch is planning to permanently demolish the Mollusk Reef Villas as well as wipe out half of Neptune Bay to build a shopping mall in its place. Rainbow, Blue and Sea Filly have to stop him in time, or they'll all be for it.
48	"The Vacation"	December 1, 2000
Rainbow and his family go on a camping trip.
49	"Cave Mates"	December 8, 2000
Important friendship is tested when Blue comes to stay in Rainbow's cave.
50	"Chomper, Master Thespian"	December 15, 2000
Chomper is given the lead role in the school play, but he mistakenly believes that voice acting is for wimps.
51	"Rainbow's Hiccups"	December 22, 2000
Rainbow's love of kelp gusher drinks causes him to get a nasty case of hiccups. It's Wanda the Octopus who eventually finds the "wild" cure.
52	"Santa Sword Is Coming to Town"	December 24, 2000
Rainbow Fish helps Sir Sword dressed up as Santa Sword on Christmas Eve.

== Production ==
Before the series was announced in 1997, Sony Wonder, the kids & family entertainment label of Sony Music Entertainment (later Sony Pictures Home Entertainment), originally acquired the rights to Marcus Pfister's book The Rainbow Fish into a direct-to-video adaptation. But one year later in 1998, Sony Wonder announced it would adapt the book into a television series with Sony Wonder producing the upcoming series & handle international distribution and partnering with German entertainment company EM.TV & Merchandising to handle co-production for the upcoming series & handle European distribution.

In May 1999 when Sony Wonder had brought New York-based American animation studio Sunbow Entertainment one year prior in 1998 during the development of the adaptation of The Rainbow Fish, Sunbow Entertainment took over international distribution of the upcoming adaptation of The Rainbow Fish from its parent Sony Wonder while it retained North American distribution to the series. Later in that year, Canadian television studio Decode Entertainment joined the upcoming co-production series with them appointed Toronto-based Funbag Animation Studio to handle animation services for the series while HBO Family commissioned the series for the network.

Distribution to the series had taken to different owners when the series ended, Sony Wonder (now Sony Pictures Kids Zone) had sold its television arm including distribution rights to the series (excluding Europe) to German management & entertainment company TV-Loonland AG in October 2000, however Sony retained the North American home video and international audio rights to Rainbow Fish; Munich-based kids & family entertainment alum Made 4 Entertainment (m4e) would take over distribution to Rainbow Fish when they brought TV-Loonland's catalogue.

m4e's Belgian production studio & competitor Studio 100 under its distribution arm Studio 100 International currently hold distribution to the series for Europe when they had brought EM.Entertainment GmbH, the German kids & family entertainment arm of EM.Sport Media AG in May 2008, Studio 100 would soon take over worldwide distribution to the series when its distribution arm Studio 100 International (known as Studio 100 Media) had brought a majority stake in m4e ten years later in February 2017, that reunited the library of co-producer EM.Entertainment with the catalogue of Sony Wonder's television division.

== Broadcast ==
Internationally, the series aired on Rai 3 in Italy, on La 2 and Cartoon Network (Small World) in Spain, on ARD in Germany, on MTV3 in Finland, on HBO Family in the United States, on Tiny Pop in the United Kingdom, and on Disney Channel (Playhouse Disney) in Australia.
