= Satellite Sisters =

Podcast and radio program

The Satellite Sisters is an internet-based podcast that originated as a syndicated radio program broadcast on Public Radio International and ABC News & Talk (via ABC Radio Networks). The program first aired on Public Radio International in 2000; A year after its launch, it was syndicated on 70 radio stations. The show revolves around five real-life sisters living in different cities. Its premise is that the sisters "get together" via satellite to talk as if they were going to meet in person or talk on the phone. The sisters typically rotate hosting duties, and the show most often is co-hosted by three of the five sisters simultaneously.

The show received the Gracie Award for Outstanding Comedy in 2008 and for Outstanding Podcast in 2009, awarded by American Women in Radio and Television.

ABC Radio ceased its syndication of the show on November 9, 2008, and the show transformed into an internet-based podcast, with weekly episodes available on Spotify and Apple podcasts.

The Sisters have written a book called Uncommon Senses. Published by Riverhead Books in 2001, the book is a collection of short stories about the Dolan sisters' lives growing up in Fairfield, Connecticut. The sisters post the podcast readings. The Satellite Sisters released a second book called You're the Best: A Celebration of Friendship in October 2015, published by Prospect Park Books.

There is also an internet community radio station named BSIDE Radio in Vancouver, Canada, that hosts a radio program that is also hosted as a podcast called Satellite Sisters on Bside Radio. This program/podcast showcases "Bassmusic" tracks produced by women and plays a mixed set by a woman DJ in every episode.

== Members ==
=== Julie Dolan ===
Julie Dolan Smith is the oldest of the sisters. She is the one "true" satellite sister as she is a "trailing spouse". She has held the position of Dean of College Admissions. Until September 2006, Julie lived in Russia and broadcast the show from overseas. After a short stay in San Francisco, she and her husband moved to Steamboat Springs, Colorado, and then relocated to Dallas, Texas. She has two grown sons. She was also the first of the sisters to become a grandmother.

=== Liz Dolan ===
Liz Dolan is the second oldest of the sisters. Liz is a 1979 graduate of Brown University. She is a former corporate vice president at the Nike Corporation. She played a major role in the development of the Satellite Sisters show. In January 2009, she was named Chief Marketing Officer for "OWN", The Oprah Winfrey Network based in Burbank, California. She then worked at Fox International as the Chief Marketing Officer. Liz resides in Santa Monica, California, with her dog, Hooper.

=== Sheila Dolan ===
Sheila Dolan is the middle sister. She previously worked as a teacher and principal in New York City. Sheila is based in Santa Monica, California, in what she refers to as "The Cozy Cottage." She has one grown daughter, Ruthie. She is often the sister who assumes the "lead" on the radio program.

=== Monica Dolan ===
Monica Dolan is the second-youngest sister. She is based in Portland, Oregon and broadcasts from her home there. Prior to joining the show, Monica worked as a nurse. Monica has a segment that spotlights artists.

=== Lian Dolan ===
Lian Dolan is the youngest sister. Lian Dolan is a writer, producer and podcaster. In addition to hosting and producing Satellite Sisters, Lian is the author of three novels: The Sweeney Sisters, published by William Morrow/HarperCollins in April 2020, and two novels, Helen of Pasadena and Elizabeth the First Wife, both published by Prospect Park Books. She has written for Working Mother magazine, O, The Oprah Magazine and Pasadena Magazine. She graduated from Pomona College in Claremont, California, with a degree in Classics. She lives in Pasadena with her husband, two grown sons and one big German shepherd.

== Uncommon senses ==
Their book, Uncommon Senses, was published in 2001. People criticized it as "excessively navel-gazing". Publishers Weekly wrote that it may have worked better on the radio than on the page and found "nothing wildly entertaining or groundbreaking" in the book.
