= French Tickner =

Canadian voice actor (1930–2021)

- Born: French Alexis Tickner; August 26, 1930; Olney, Illinois, U.S.
- Died: August 26, 2021 (aged 91); Vancouver, British Columbia, Canada
- Citizenship: United States; Canada
- Occupation: Actor
- Years active: 1946–2016

French Alexis Tickner (August 26, 1930 – August 26, 2021) was an American–born Canadian voice, film and television actor, known for his work in Ocean Productions.

== Filmography ==
=== Anime/Animation ===
- Death Note - Quillish "Watari" Wammy
- Black Lagoon - Alfred
- Pucca - Santa
- Powerpuff Girls Z - Santa
- Hikaru no Go - Honinbo Kuwabara
- Transformers: Energon - Bulkhead
- Fantastic Four: World's Greatest Heroes - Grandmaster
- A Monkey's Tale - Korkonak
- Being Ian - Willy Willychuk, Snowy
- Class of the Titans - Poseidon
- Master Keaton - Klause, Greenpark, Libero
- Mega Man NT Warrior - Mayor Daryl
- Inuyasha - Kagome's Grandpa
- Krypto the Superdog - Kevin's Grandpa
- Firehouse Tales - Wiser
- Martha Speaks - Scientist
- He-Man and the Masters of the Universe - Sortech
- Mobile Suit Gundam - Dozle Zabi
- Dragon Ball Z - King Moai, Mr. Popo (Ocean Group dub)
- Nellie the Elephant - Narrator (US Dub)
- Madeline - Lord Cucuface
- Barbie in the Nutcracker - Grandfather Drosselmayer
- Fatal Fury 2: The New Battle - Jubei Yamada
- Rainbow Fish - Principal Gefilte, Lobster Bisque, Crab Cakes
- Hulk Vs. - Odin
- Bionicle 3: Web of Shadows - Norik
- Sabrina, the Animated Series - Additional Voices
- Monster Mash - Drac
- Ben Hur - Gaspar, Jewish Man, Doctor
- Robin and the Dreamweavers - Dr. Reedenhauer
- Jin-Roh: The Wolf Brigade - Isao Aniya
- Ranma ½ - Shinnosuke's Grandfather
- Gadget & the Gadgetinis - Additional Voices
- Salty's Lighthouse - Top Hat, Warrior, Grampus, Steamer, Scuttle Butt Pete
- Adventures of Sonic the Hedgehog - Professor Von Schlemmer
- Dragon Tales - Gamboli, Chilly the Snowman
- Capertown Cops
- Pocket Dragon Adventures - Additional Voices
- Mummies Alive! - Additional Voices
- Fat Dog Mendoza - Old Grandpappy Buddy
- Iron Man: Armored Adventures - Professor Zimmer
- In Search of Santa - Santa Claus
- Ultraviolet: Code 044 - King
- X-Men: Evolution - Professor
- Monster Rancher - Wondar Brother #2
- The Christmas Orange - Santa
- RoboCop: Alpha Commando - Additional Voices
- Action Man - Additional Voices
- Hurricanes - Additional Voices
- A Tale of Two Kitties - Grandpa
- Ricky Sprocket: Showbiz Boy
- Timothy Tweedle the First Christmas Elf - Nicholas
- The Little Prince - The Great Timekeeper
- Superbook - Isaac
- Beat Bugs - Christmas Beetle

=== Live-action ===
- Psych - Carl (S2, E10)
- Ernest Goes to School - Principal Procter
- The Death of the Incredible Hulk - George Tilmer
- The X-Files - Preacher
- Smallville - Jewelry Store Owner/Simon Westcott

=== Video games ===
- Mobile Suit Gundam: Encounters in Space - Dozle Zabi
- Dynasty Warriors Gundam 2 - Dozle Zabi
- Dynasty Warriors Gundam 3 - Dozle Zabi
