= Monster Mash (2000 film) =

- Italian DVD cover
- Directed by: Guido Manuli
- Written by: Guido Manuli; Judy Rothman Rofé
- Produced by: Andy Heyward; Robby London; Michael Maliani
- Starring: French Tickner; David Sobolov; Scott McNeil; Ian James Corlett; Janyse Jaud; Tabitha St. Germain
- Narrated by: Phil Trainer
- Edited by: Tom King; Ian Bartell
- Music by: John Carnochan
- Production companies: DIC Entertainment (Note: Animation outsourced to Phoenix Korea Animation.); RAI Radiotelevisione Italiana; Rai Fiction
- Distributed by: Universal Studios Home Video (North America); RAI Trade (Europe, EMEA, Asia)
- Release date: August 29, 2000
- Running time: 60 minutes
- Countries: Italy; United States
- Language: English
- Budget: $2 million

Monster Mash (Italian: Chi ha paura?) is a 2000 Italian-American direct-to-video animated musical comedy horror film co-produced by DIC Entertainment and Rai Fiction. It is an original story, based on the lore of Frankenstein's monster, the Wolfman, and Count Dracula.

== Plot ==
At Monster Mash Park, the skeletal dog Yorick talks about his owners Drac, Frank, and Wolf. They were the scariest monsters around and became an inspiration to monsters everywhere when they struck fear in the local mortals. As the years go by, they lose their ability to scare and become associated with fun, and were shown to have a heart when Frank did not scare a little girl during one of their scaring activities.

Upon Drac, Frank, and Wolf's activities getting discovered, they are visited by the troll public server Tribunal who reads them a summons to appear before the Superior Court of Horrors. Their court date was scheduled for just before Halloween, where they are represented by the mummy defense attorney Guslot who once got $1,000,000.00 for Mr. Hyde when he sued Dr. Jekyll for malpractice. The Grim Reaper Prosecutor gets a testimony from the monster dentist Dr. Decay who talks about Drac losing his fangs and now wearing false teeth. Then the Prosecutor gets a testimony from monster hair loss specialist Dr. Grogan who mentions about Wolf's different bald spots. As the Prosecutor's final exhibit, he brings in a human baby where Wolf fails to scare it and Frank shows a soft spot. Guslot constantly objects as the Judge briefly places his head on Guslot's body to get the verdict from the skeleton jury. Because the jury's written verdict is deadlocked, the judge declares that they have a hung jury. In exchange for Drac, Wolf, and Frank being released, the Judge states that they must prove that they are still scary by the end of 24 hours or they will be thrown out of the Ghoul Guild and sentenced to an eternity entertaining at children's parties. When the Prosecutor asks what family he has in mind, the Judge assigns the trio to scare the suburban Tinklemeister family consisting of Mr. Tinklemeister, Mrs. Tinklemeister, Stella Tinklemeister, and the mostly-whistling Spike Tinklemeister.

Upon bringing the Tinklemeisters to Transylvania, Drac, Wolf, and Frank try every attempt to scare them to no avail. The Prosecutor sends the three modern monsters Freddie de Spaghetti: King of Carbohydrates, the reality-warping Chicky: Doll of Destruction, and the Alien Eater to make sure that they all fail in their mission. Surrendering from the final attempt, the trio informs the Tinklemeisters their story. The Tinklemeisters decide to help them prove that they are still scary. When Freddie, Chickie, and the Alien Eater attack, Drac, Wolf, and Frank take refuge in a lab. Stella spins Drac around enough for his fangs to come out as Spike pours a formula on Drac's false fangs. Then Spike charges up Frank while Mr. Tinklemeister applies special shampoo to get rid of the gray hairs on Wolf. They managed to scare off Freddie, Chicky, and the Alien Eater.

At the Superior Court of Horrors, the Prosecutor states that Drac, Wolf, and Frank have failed as the Tinklemeisters see the court case on their television. To the dismay of the Prosecutor, the Judge states that Drac, Wolf, and Frank still did some scaring. The Superior Court of Horrors' surprise witness is Spike who finally speaks for the first time where he speaks in the defense of Drac, Wolf, and Frank. He admitted that the monsters from the horror comics he read made him too scared to speak, hence why he whistled all the time, much to the surprise of his family. Spike continues by stating that Freddie, Chicky, and the Alien Eater "turned to putty" when they met some "real monsters" in the form of Drac, Wolf, and Frank. Moved by Spike's speech and in accordance to Loophole #381B, the Judge reinstates Drac, Wolf, and Frank into the Ghoul Guild for eternity.

Back in the present, Yorick stated that Drac, Wolf, and Frank were inducted into the Monster Hall of Fame and the heart and souls of the Tinklemeister family forever. After opening an amusement park on the castle grounds, Drac, Wolf, and Frank's desire to haunt the public returned. At Monster Mash Park, the tourists ride a roller coaster where they dodge Freddie's attacks, throw tomatoes at the Alien Eater, control the channels that Chickie appears on, and get one last scare from Drac, Wolf, and Frank.

== Cast ==
=== Italian voices ===
- Mino Caprio as Drac, the king of vampires and leader of the group
- Renato Cortesi as Wolf, the howling rockstar of the group
- Mario Bombadieri as Frank, the stitched-up muscle of the group
- Gigi Proietti as Yorick, a talking skeleton dog who is the narrator of the story and the pet of Drac, Wolf, and Frank
- Flavio Aquilone as Spike Tinklemeister, the youngest and smartest of the family who only communicates through whistling and has read many horror comics
- Silvia Pepitone as Mrs. Tinklemeister, the matriarch of the family who is obsessed with cleaning up messes
- Ambrogio Colombo as Mr. Tinklemeister, the patriarch of the family who is a professional dog groomer
- Alida Milana as Stella Tinklemeister, Spike's fun-loving older sister
- Massimo Corvo as The Judge, the skeletal "ogre" (the monster community's word for "honor") of the Superior Court of Horrors who likes to play basketball with his own head
- Stefano De Sando as The Prosecutor, a Grim Reaper who wants to win the case against the main trio
- Roberto Stocchi as:
  - Tribunal, a troll public server
  - Dr. Frank Grogan, a monster hair loss specialist
  - Gargoyle
- Francesco Vairano as Dr. Decay, a monster dentist

=== English dub ===
- French Tickner as:
  - Drac
  - Dr. Decay
- Scott McNeil as:
  - Wolf
  - Dr. Frank Grogan
- David Sobolov as:
  - Frank
  - Alien Eater
- Janyse Jaud as:
  - Spike Tinklemeister
  - Mrs. Tinklemeister
- Robert O. Smith as
  - Mr. Tinklemeister
  - Yorick
    - Phil Trainer provides Yorick's singing voice
- Patricia Drake as:
  - Stella Tinklemeister
  - Airport Announcer
- Dave "Squatch" Ward as Freddie de Spaghetti: King of Carbohydrates
- Tabitha St. Germain as:
  - Chickie: Doll of Destruction
  - A baby
  - A screaming girl
- Phil Hayes as:
  - The Judge
  - Tribunal
  - Vulture
- Jim Byrnes as:
  - The Prosecutor
  - Wolf #1
- Ian James Corlett as:
  - Guslot
  - Wolf #2
  - Gargoyle
  - Baby Drac

== Production ==
The film was originally titled Who's Afraid?, until the then-Disney-owned DIC Entertainment picked up the project from RAI as part of a four-year on-and-off deal between both companies. The film's title was changed after DIC acquired the rights to the "Monster Mash" song, and brought along Judy Rothman Rofé to modify the script to suit American audiences. 20th Century Fox Home Entertainment was originally intended to distribute the film, but backed out of the deal, with PolyGram Video acquiring home video rights while Buena Vista Television held television distribution rights. The film was made on a $2 million budget.

Internationally, distribution was shared between Universal and RAI, with RAI Trade handling home video distribution sales in Europe, EMEA and Asian territories, while Universal Pictures Video picked up all remaining territories.

== Songs ==
- "Monster Mash" (Robert Pickett)
- "Waiting for Spike to Speak" (Matt McGuire) – Mom, Dad and Stella
- "The Heebe Jeebe" (McGuire, Karen Guthery)
- "When We Were Bad" (Sandy Howell, Geoff Levin) – Frank, Drac and Wolf
- "Monster Mash"
  - Funk Groove arrangement by David Pavlovitch
  - Country arrangement by Matt McGuire
  - Alternative Angst arrangement by Jason Michas

== Release ==
Monster Mash was released on VHS on August 29, 2000, in the United States and Canada by Universal Studios Home Video as part of the Haunted House of Fun promotion, alongside Alvin and the Chipmunks Meet the Wolfman and Archie's Weird Mysteries: Archie and the Riverdale Vampires.

The film saw a VHS and DVD release in Italy in October 2003 by Alfadedis Entertainment and Medusa Video.

In the United States and Canada, the feature was bundled alongside Alvin and the Chipmunks Meet Frankenstein, Alvin and the Chipmunks Meet the Wolfman and four episodes of Archie's Weird Mysteries as part of the Monster Bash Fun Pack DVD on September 7, 2004.

A standalone DVD was released by NCircle Entertainment in 2007. This release of the film removes a metafictional moment towards the end of the film as well as the "Monster Mash" music video due to copyright restrictions with the song cover.

== Reception ==
Bruno Ventavoli from La Stampa described the film as 'ingenious', 'sixty minutes of intelligence and irony on the meaning of fear' characterized by 'a soft and classy design, endless pleasant citations of horror b-movies that constitute the sentimental education of moviegoers, [and] ironic and wise reflections on the educational meaning of fright'.
