= List of Strawberry Shortcake's Berry Bitty Adventures episodes =

Strawberry Shortcake's Berry Bitty Adventures is the third incarnation of American Greetings' Strawberry Shortcake character. The first episode of the show is "A Berry Grand Opening" which aired on March 21, 2009. The show was created by Chris Nee, and was previewed on The Hub on October 10, 2010, and made its official premiere on October 11. It is also currently airing on Family Jr. in Canada and Discovery Kids in Latin America.

A fourth season aired on June 20, 2015 and ended on September 12 the same year.

== Series overview ==
Season	Episodes	Originally released	
Season	Episodes	First released	Last released
1	26	October 10, 2010	November 15, 2010
2	13	November 5, 2011	March 24, 2012
3	13	February 23, 2013	May 11, 2013
4	13	June 20, 2015	September 12, 2015

== Episodes ==
=== Season 1 (2010) ===
No. overall	No. in season	Title	Directed by	Written by	Storyboard by	Original release date
1	1	"Fish Out of Water"	Bob Hathcock	Karl Geurs and Lisa Melbye	Dan Fausett; Clint Taylor	October 10, 2010
While packing up picnic things, Orange Blossom adopts what she believes to be a fish, but soon discovers that it is a tadpole. Even as it grows and causes trouble, Orange is determined to keep it from everyone else's business.
2	2	"A Stitch in Time"	Bob Hathcock	Karl Geurs and Lisa Melbye	Gloria Jenkins; Carin Greco	October 11, 2010
Plum Pudding and her friends secretly work on Raspberry Torte's dress for Strawberry Shortcake's as Strawberry struggles to spot a shooting star in order to improve her poetry skills after Mr. Longface reads her poem.
3	3	"Vanishing Violets"	Bob Hathcock	Karl Geurs, Lisa Melbye and Jill Cozza-Turner	Fred Reyes; Thom Nesbitt	October 12, 2010
Lemon Meringue is growing violets for a flower festival, but when they suddenly disappear, she begins to suspect BerryKin Bloom of stealing them.
4	4	"Babysitter Blues"	Bob Hathcock	Karl Geurs and Lisa Melbye	Clay Christman; Mike West	October 13, 2010
Something strange has been going on in the Berry Works, and Strawberry, along with her friends, soon find out that a Baby Berrykin is causing all of the madness. Strawberry offers to take care of Baby Berrykin, but soon discovers that it is a difficult task.
5	5	"Hair Today, Gone Tomorrow"	Bob Hathcock	Karl Geurs and Lisa Melbye	Clint Taylor; Lyndon Ruddy	October 14, 2010
Lemon buys a machine to make hair-styling faster and better, but soon she feels left out and sad, and worries that her job might be over for good.
6	6	"Pop Goes the Garden"	Bob Hathcock	Karl Geurs, Lisa Melbye and Jill Cozza-Turner	Gloria Jenkins; Thom Nesbitt	October 18, 2010
Blueberry Muffin buys some daisy seeds, but when planted, they unexpectedly grow into explosive corn stalks. When she calls the Daisy Company, they send her a new packet of seeds, but she and the others must decide what to do with all of the giant ears of corn before somebody could get hurt.
7	7	"The Berry Best You Can Bee"	Bob Hathcock	Karl Geurs and Lisa Melbye	Samanta Palomino; Fred Reyes; Clay Christman	October 19, 2010
When a delivery bee is sick, Strawberry offers to help Postmaster Bumble-Bee deliver a special birthday package to Berry Bitty Dale.
8	8	"Strawberry's House Pest"	Bob Hathcock	Karl Geurs and Lisa Melbye	Paul Soeiro; Clint Taylor	October 20, 2010
Strawberry struggles to be the "berry" best hostess when she has the very worst house guest.
9	9	"Berry Bitty World Record"	Bob Hathcock	Karl Geurs and Lisa Melbye	Gloria Jenkins; Thom Nesbitt	October 21, 2010
Orange plans to win a holiday trip for Berrykin Bloom, so the others try and figure out a way as Mr. Longface worries that the girls have a crazy disease.
10	10	"Too Cool for Rules"	Bob Hathcock	Karl Geurs and Lisa Melbye	Fred Reyes; Samanta Palomino; Thom Nesbitt	October 22, 2010
Plum starts making up weird rules at her dance studio.
11	11	"Berry Best BerryFest Princess"	Bob Hathcock	Karl Geurs, Lisa Melbye and Jill Cozza-Turner	Phil Mosness; Clint Taylor	October 25, 2010
Berry Bitty City has an election for a temporary princess while Princess Berrykin is absent.
12	12	"Strawberry's Berry Big Parade"	Bob Hathcock	Karl Geurs and Lisa Melbye	Ken Laramay; Leah Waldron	October 26, 2010
Strawberry is put in charge of the BerryFest parade and looks to her friends for help with the chores.
13	13	"The Berry Best Choice"	Bob Hathcock	Karl Geurs and Lisa Melbye	Gloria Jenkins	October 27, 2010
Strawberry learns how to be a leader and face obstacles to make sure the BerryFest is a success as they search for the mysterious wonderberry.
14	14	"Nothing to Fear, but Berries Themselves"	Bob Hathcock	Karl Geurs and Lisa Melbye	Fred Reyes; Thom Nesbitt	October 28, 2010
Orange fears that the Galumpalots is real, and when there is a power cut in Lemon's salon, the girls act silly and think that it does exist.
15	15	"Where, Oh Where Has My Blueberry Gone?"	Bob Hathcock	Karl Geurs and Lisa Melbye	Peter Ferk; Holly Forsyth	October 29, 2010
Blueberry starts reading Patty Persimmon mystery novels, which make her forget about meetings or appointments with her friends.
16	16	"Manners Meltdown"	Bob Hathcock	Karl Geurs, Lisa Melbye and Jill Cozza-Turner	Gloria Jenkins	November 1, 2010
During the Berry Derby party, a formal event that has traditional etiquette rules, Blueberry embarrasses herself when she makes a bad impression in front of Princess BerryKin. Blueberry then tries as hard as she can — a bit too hard, in fact - to remain on her best behavior.
17	17	"Trading Sizes"	Bob Hathcock	Karl Geurs and Lisa Melbye	Fred Reyes; Gloria Jenkins; Clint Taylor	November 2, 2010
Raspberry finds a way to enlarge the Berrykins to the same size as Strawberry and her friends until a shrinking potion shrinks the girls in the process.
18	18	"Different Waltz for Different Faults"	Bob Hathcock	Karl Geurs and Lisa Melbye	Hank Tucker; Clint Taylor	November 3, 2010
During the Dance-Off, Plum tries to get her friends and the Berrykins to dance like a rival dance team to win the trophy.
19	19	"Happy First Frost"	Bob Hathcock	Karl Geurs and Lisa Melbye	Hank Tucker; Thom Nesbitt	November 4, 2010
Blueberry gives a First Frost Day gift that is more what she wants than the recipient as Strawberry searches for a rare flower for Mr. Longface.
20	20	"A Circle of Friends"	Bob Hathcock	Karl Geurs and Lisa Melbye	Daryll Kidder; Alex Mann	November 5, 2010
Raspberry gets upset when she suspects her friends of copying her lantern design for the Glimmerberry Gathering.
21	21	"GlimmerBerry Ball"	Bob Hathcock	Karl Geurs, Lisa Melbye and Jill Cozza-Turner	Peter Ferk; Holly Forsyth	November 8, 2010
Plum finds an ideal location for the Glimmerberry Ball, but two chipmunks keep crashing her party.
22	22	"Nice as Nails"	Bob Hathcock	Karl Geurs and Lisa Melbye	Fred Reyes; Thom Nesbitt	November 9, 2010
Lemon comes up with a clever idea on a new manicure called "The Glamicure". It starts out as fun and musical, but soon the embedded music and lights start to drive everyone crazy.
23	23	"How You Play the Game"	Bob Hathcock	Karl Geurs and Lisa Melbye	Gloria Jenkins; Nate Clesowich; Francisco Barrios; Kimberly Narsete	November 10, 2010
A new game comes to Berry Bitty City that starts to encroach on the town's other activities.
24	24	"Good Citizens Club"	Bob Hathcock	Karl Geurs, Lisa Melbye and Jill Cozza-Turner	Daryll Kidder; Clint Taylor	November 11, 2010
Sadiebug and Kadiebug create a new club as Plum would do anything to join the membership.
25	25	"Team for Two"	Bob Hathcock	Karl Geurs and Lisa Melbye	Gloria Jenkins	November 12, 2010
Lemon and Raspberry must work together to make a Day Care Center for the Baby Berrykins.
26	26	"Lost and Found"	Bob Hathcock	Karl Geurs and Lisa Melbye	Fred Reyes; Tim Maltby	November 15, 2010
Strawberry loses her pets and her friends help find them.

=== Season 2 (2011–12) ===
No. overall	No. in season	Title	Original release date
27	1	"The Berry Big Harvest"	November 5, 2011
Orange Blossom struggles to deal with an overflow of new products at her store.
28	2	"Room at the Top"	November 12, 2011
Strawberry Shortcake adds a new bedroom over her produce marketplace with her friends' help.
29	3	"Starlight, Star Bright"	November 19, 2011
Strawberry Shortcake's friends decide to surprise her by inviting her favorite singer, Cherry Jam, to Berry Bitty City to perform live at the grand opening of the new marketplace.
30	4	"Practice Makes Perfect"	November 26, 2011
Plum Pudding gets stage fright at one of Cherry Jam's recitals.
31	5	"Top Talent"	December 3, 2011
The girls prepare for a talent show, where Lemon Meringue insists that she does not need any assistance with her performance.
32	6	"A Star is Fashioned"	December 10, 2011
Raspberry Torte considers moving to the big city in order to work with top fashion designers.
33	7	"No Blueberry is an Island"	January 28, 2012
Blueberry Muffin mishears Strawberry Shortcake talking about a dream vacation and tells all of her friends.
34	8	"Where the Berry Breeze Blows"	February 11, 2012
Strawberry Shortcake and her friends plan on going on a dream vacation, but the resort gets cancelled and forces them to think outside the box.
35	9	"The Berry Best Vacation"	February 25, 2012
The girls' vacation is interrupted when a TV reporter stops by to interview Cherry Jam.
36	10	"The Berry Long Winter"	March 3, 2012
Early spring-like weather brings everyone's hopes down, but when the cold returns, the town must decide if they want to share their supplies.
37	11	"The Big Freeze"	March 10, 2012
Blueberry Muffin invents parasol-powered ice skates and gets to create her own musical commercial.
38	12	"On Ice"	March 17, 2012
Strawberry Shortcake helps Raspberry Torte and Berrykin Bruce compromise on planning a spring-theme event allowing them to combine their efforts.
39	13	"On the Road"	March 24, 2012
The girls train the Berrykins to run their businesses while they head out of town on a concert tour.

=== Season 3 (2013) ===
No. overall	No. in season	Title	Original release date
40	1	"A Boy and His Dogs"	February 23, 2013
Strawberry Shortcake and the girls help free a visitor and a bundle of stray puppies, and they all become good friends.
41	2	"Partners in Crime"	February 23, 2013
Blueberry Muffin invites Huckleberry Pie to team up and write a mystery story for an online magazine.
42	3	"The Mystery of the Disappearing Dog Show"	March 2, 2013
Strawberry Shortcake hosts a dog show, which becomes unexpectedly entertaining when Plum Pudding attempts to turn the competition into an extravagant performance.
43	4	"Snowberry and the Seven Berrykins"	March 9, 2013
When Plum Pudding directs a fairy tale play, it becomes too elaborate and turns into a comical disaster.
44	5	"Berryella and Prince Charming"	March 16, 2013
Huck is drafted by the girls to play Prince Berry Charming.
45	6	"The Littlest Berrykin"	March 23, 2013
While Blueberry Muffin and Huckleberry Pie narrate their new play, the girls imagine themselves as the princesses.
46	7	"The Berry Big Relay Race"	March 30, 2013
Strawberry Shortcake and the girls hold a relay race while waiting for the sparkleberry juice system to be fixed.
47	8	"The Berry Best Treasure"	April 6, 2013
Cherry Jam and the girls go on a treasure hunt to search for their missing puppies.
48	9	"The Berry Scary Fun Adventure"	April 13, 2013
While on a camping trip, the girls get worried and build a series of traps, and are surprised by what they catch.
49	10	"The Berry Lucky Day"	April 20, 2013
Huck discovers that the good luck charm he found belongs to Cherry Jam. Strawberry Shortcake, however, helps Huck and Cherry Jam realize where their luck really comes from.
50	11	"All Dogs Allowed"	April 27, 2013
While the girls are planning an afternoon tea party, something scares the puppies away and the girls have to solve the mystery before they can celebrate.
51	12	"A Basket of Blue Berries"	May 4, 2013
After inviting Huck to the Masquerade Ball, Blueberry Muffin becomes ill.
52	13	"The Berry Biggest, Berry Baddest Bakeoff"	May 11, 2013
The girls get competitive with each other while baking big cupcakes for Berrykin Bloom.

=== Season 4 (2015) ===
No. overall	No. in season	Title	Original release date
53	1	"Berry Double Trouble"	June 20, 2015
Raspberry Torte and Lemon Meringue enlist the help of twins to run Strawberry Shortcake's Cafe so that she can participate in an Internet fashion show.
54	2	"Berry Bitty Adventurer"	June 27, 2015
Strawberry Shortcake's world-traveling cousin Apple Dumplin visits Berry Bitty City, but brings trouble along with her.
55	3	"High Tech Drama"	July 4, 2015
Sweet Grapes and Sour Grapes have an argument, which everyone discovers on Berrynet.
56	4	"A Berry Merry Birthday"	July 11, 2015
Sweet Grapes and Sour Grapes decide to have separate birthdays, but begin to miss each other.
57	5	"Tell Tale Trio"	July 18, 2015
This episode is also called Tall Tale Trio. Everyone goes on a camping trip, but Orange Blossom, Plum Pudding and Cherry Jam have some trouble and tell tall tales.
58	6	"Berry Big Tale-Teller"	July 25, 2015
Sweet Grapes and Sour Grapes return from a big adventure and tell everyone about what happened.
59	7	"The Berry Bitty Great Race"	August 1, 2015
Apple Dumplin tells a story about competing in the Berry Bitty Great Race.
60	8	"The Berry Best Taste Test"	August 8, 2015
Strawberry Shortcake has a new business line, but then a bad food comes along.
61	9	"The Berry Best Biscuit"	August 15, 2015
Sour Grapes teases Apple Dumplin about eating a dog biscuit, and they both start a prank war.
62	10	"Hot Sauce Cook Off"	August 22, 2015
Berrykin Bloom competes again with his cousin Berrykin Bertman.
63	11	"The Berry Bitty Dance Disaster"	August 29, 2015
Apple Dumplin makes some dancing shoes to help her dance good, but it also brings trouble to everyone.
64	12	"The Doggie Dance No-Show"	September 5, 2015
Tom Tom is afraid to dance in front of everyone.
65	13	"Dance Puppy Dance"	September 12, 2015
Cherry Jam writes a new song, but it starts to annoy her. This episode is the series finale.

== North American DVD episode list ==
DVD name	Season	Episodes	Release date
The Berryfest Princess Movie	1	Berry Best BerryFest Princess; Strawberry's Berry Big Parade; The Berry Best Choice (edited together as a feature-length movie)	March 2, 2010
The Glimmerberry Ball Movie	1	Happy First Frost; A Circle of Friends; Glimmerberry Ball (edited together as a feature-length movie)	August 31, 2010
Puttin' on the Glitz	1	Hair Today, Gone Tomorrow; Too Cool for Rules; Nice as Nails	March 22, 2011
Bright Lights, Big Dreams	1	Strawberry's House Pest; Berry Bitty World Record; Different Waltz for Different Faults	November 1, 2011
Bloomin' Berry Garden	1	Pop Goes the Garden; Vanishing Violets; Trading Sizes	March 6, 2012
Jammin' with Cherry Jam	2	Starlight, Star Bright; Practice Makes Perfect; Top Talent; A Star is Fashioned	September 11, 2012
Berry Friends Forever	1	Manners Meltdown; Good Citizens Club; Team for Two; The Berry Best You Can Bee	March 5, 2013
Berry Bitty Mysteries	1	Nothing to Fear, but Berries Themselves; Where, Oh Where Has My Blueberry Gone? Lost and Found	September 24, 2013
Berry Big Help	1	Babysitter Blues; A Stitch in Time; Fish Out of Water	February 18, 2014
Fun Under the Sun	2	No Blueberry is an Island; Where the Berry Breeze Blows; The Berry Best Vacation	May 13, 2014
Berry Best Friends	2	The Berry Big Harvest; Room at the Top; On the Road	September 16, 2014
Snowberry Days	2	The Berry Long Winter; The Big Freeze; On Ice	February 10, 2015
Berry Best in Show	3	Partners in Crime; A Boy and His Dogs; The Mystery of the Disappearing Dog Show	May 12, 2015
Berry Tales	3	Snowberry and the Seven Berrykins; Berryella and Prince Charming; The Littlest Berrykin	August 11, 2015
Sweet Sunshine Adventures	3	The Berry Big Relay Race; The Berry Best Treasure; The Berry Scary Fun Adventure	March 1, 2016
Berry Bake Shop	3	The Berry, Biggest, Berry Baddest Bakeoff; The Berry Lucky Day; A Basket of Blue Berries	March 1, 2016
Campberry Stories	4	Tall Tale Trio; Berry Big Tale-Teller; The Berry Bitty Great Race	June 7, 2016
Berry Hi-Tech Fashion	4	Berry Double Trouble; Berry Bitty Adventurer; High Tech Drama	October 18, 2016
Berry Best Chef	4	The Berry Best Taste Test; The Berry Best Biscuit; Hot Sauce Cook Off	February 7, 2017
Dance Berry Dance	4	A Berry Merry Birthday; The Berry Bitty Dance Disaster; Doggie Dance No-Show; Dance Puppy Dance	May 30, 2017
