= The Trumpet of the Swan (film) =

2001 film by Richard Rich

- Theatrical release poster
- Directed by: Richard Rich; Terry L. Noss
- Screenplay by: Judy Rothman Rofé
- Based on: The Trumpet of the Swan by E.B. White
- Produced by: Paul J. Newman; Lin Oliver
- Starring: Jason Alexander; Mary Steenburgen; Reese Witherspoon; Seth Green; Carol Burnett; Joe Mantegna
- Edited by: Joe Campana
- Music by: Marcus Miller
- Production companies: TriStar Pictures; Nest Family Entertainment; RichCrest Animation Studios
- Distributed by: Sony Pictures Releasing
- Release date: May 11, 2001 (United States)
- Running time: 75 minutes
- Country: United States
- Language: English
- Box office: $628,387

The Trumpet of the Swan is a 2001 American animated drama film produced by Nest Family Entertainment and RichCrest Animation Studios, directed by Richard Rich and Terry L. Noss, starring Jason Alexander, Mary Steenburgen, Reese Witherspoon, Seth Green, Carol Burnett and Joe Mantegna, produced by TriStar Pictures, Nest Family Entertainment and RichCrest Animation Studios and distributed by Sony Pictures Releasing. The film had a limited release on May 11, 2001, before having a wide release on June 22, 2001. The film received negative reviews from critics and grossed $628,387.

== Plot ==
A father cob and a mother pen witness the birth of three of their cygnets, whom the former names Ella, Billie, and Louie. However, Louie is rendered mute and is unable to ko-hoh like all the other swans. Louie is ostracized by the other cygnets though he does befriend another female cygnet named Serena, and a human boy named Sam Beaver after he saves his sisters from a hungry fox. The swans migrate to Red Rock Lake in Montana, and the father cob, determined to find a voice for Louie, flies off to the nearby town of Billings in search of one. He breaks into a nearby music store and steals a trumpet in the process though he begins to feel guilty for his actions even though he did it for Louie.

Meanwhile, Louie, determined to find a way to communicate with his family and the other swans thanks to an idea from Sweets, a smooth-talking squirrel he befriended, reunites with Sam at his school and tells him that he wants to learn how to read and write. Sam manages to convince his teacher Mrs. Hammerbottom to teach Louie how to read and write after telling her that differences are important in life, and she reluctantly agrees. Over the seasons, Louie begins to learn how to read and write, and by the time he reaches adulthood, he becomes a natural. He returns to the lake to show off his newfound knowledge to all the swans, but they are still unable to understand him, causing Louie to swim away in heartbreak. The father cob gives Louie the trumpet and encourages him to use it to find his true voice from within. Despite a rocky start, Louie manages to get the hang of it.

One night, Louie overhears his father suffering from his guilt for stealing the trumpet from the music store back in Billings due to a nightmare he had where he was pursued by the authorities. Determined to help him regain his honor, Louie reunites with Sam at his camp and informs him of the theft that his father committed. Sam suggests to Louie that he get a job so that he can earn the money to pay for the trumpet and the damage to the music store, and as a result, Louie is hired as the camps bugler. Louie begins to spend time with the campers, and he is even hailed a hero after he saves fellow camper A.G. from a waterfall. Later, Sam gives Louie his salary and tells him that he must earn more money in bigger cities.

Louie flies to Boston and meets another squirrel named the Senator who offers his assistance to him. While searching for work, he attracts the attention of Monty, an entrepreneur who, impressed with his musical talent, offers to make him a star while secretly planning to exploit him for profit. Louie becomes a famous musician, and Monty even gets him a room at a hotel. One night, Louie is informed of a message via the internut that Serena and Boyd are getting married tomorrow after the former reluctantly accepted the latter’s marriage proposal at her father Maurice’s persuasion. Louie attempts to leave but is caught by Monty who attempts to clip his wings and render him flightless, still determined to use his musical talent for profit. The Senator and one of the squirrels incapacitate Monty, giving Louie the chance to escape.

After flying through dangerous obstacles in the sky, Louie manages to arrive just in time and professes his love to Serena. Boyd knocks the trumpet out of Louie’s hand and starts attacking him while attempting to chase him away from the lake, but Louie, using his newfound knowledge of reading and writing, manages to outsmart him, and Boyd ends up crashing into a rock wall. Afterwards, Louie and Serena share a romantic moment with each other.

Later, the father cob apologizes to Louie for thinking he was defective in the first place, and Louie gives him the bag of money that he can use to pay for the trumpet and the damage to the store, much to his delight. Seeing this as an opportunity to redeem himself and regain his honor, the father cob and Louie fly to Billings to deliver the money to the music store. The storekeeper, thinking that he’s here to steal from him again, attempts to shoot at him with a shotgun. Despite Louie trying to protect his father, he shoots the latter, and he seemingly "dies" from the gunshot wound. The storekeeper is chastised for his actions even after being given the money used to pay for the trumpet and the damage to the store, along with a note. Emergency services arrive to tend to the father cob, but it is soon revealed that he is alive, having fainted from the gunshot wound earlier (it is implied that the storekeeper might have missed his target). The storekeeper even offers to use the money to help protect the swans. The father cob and Louie then return to the lake and reunite with their loved ones. After monologuing about his apparent death for a long period of time, the father cob discovers to his surprise that Serena has laid eight eggs, indicating that she and Louie are going to start a family of their own real soon. The film ends with Louie and Serena welcoming three of their cygnets into the world.

== Cast ==
- Dee Bradley Baker as Louie
- Jason Alexander as Father
- Mary Steenburgen as Mother
- Reese Witherspoon as Serena
- Seth Green as Boyd
- Carol Burnett as Mrs. Hammerbotham
- Joe Mantegna as Monty
- Sam Gifaldi as Sam Beaver
- Melissa Disney as Billie
- Kath Soucie as Serena (cygnet) / Paramedic / Newscaster
- E. G. Daily as Ella
- Pamela Segall Adlon as A.G. Skinner
- Steve Vinovich as Maurice / Roger
- Gary Anthony Williams as Sweets
- Corey Burton as Senator
- Michael Winslow as Chief
- David Jeremiah as Squirrel / Hawk
- Julie Nathanson as Felicity
- Dana Daurey as Apathy
- Michael Kostroff as Waiter
- Lee Magnuson as Clerk
- Steve Franken as Bud
- Norman Parker as Policeman
- Jack Angel as Justice of the Geese

== Release ==
Originally intended for a direct-to-video release, Tri-Star Pictures announced in March 2001 that the film will receive a limited theatrical release so it can qualify for the newly introduced Academy Award for Best Animated Feature. The film was released on May 11, 2001 in 125 theaters.

== Reception ==
=== Critical response ===
On the review aggregator website Rotten Tomatoes, 13% of 40 critics' reviews are positive, with an average rating of 4.1/10. The website's consensus reads: "An uninspired E.B. White adaptation that's targeted at the very young." Metacritic, which uses a weighted average, assigned the film a score of 27 out of 100, based on 15 critics, indicating "generally unfavorable" reviews.

Roger Ebert of the Chicago Sun-Times gave the film half a star out of four, calling it "innocuous" and a "slow-going" effort. Jeremy Arnold of Variety called it a bland animated musical which offers little to charm audiences, being hampered by its lackluster execution. Stephen Holden of The New York Times noted the film's "conceptual confusion" and criticized the film's inability to cohere into a compelling dramatic whole despite it being a right-minded fable.

=== Box office ===
The film grossed $102,202 on its opening weekend. By the end of its run, The Trumpet of the Swan grossed a mere $628,387.

== Awards and nominations ==
In 2001, it was nominated by the Casting Society of America for best voice-casting in an animated film, but lost the award to Disney's The Emperor's New Groove.
