= Strawberry Shortcake (TV series) =

2003 TV series

- Genre: Animated series, preschool, E/I
- Created by: Those Characters From Cleveland; American Greetings
- Theme music composer: Judy Rothman Rofe (lyrics); Andy Street (music)
- Opening theme: "Straw Buh-buh-buh-buh-berry Shortcake" performed by Sandy Howell (uncredited)
- Ending theme: "Straw Buh-buh-buh-buh-berry Shortcake" (instrumental)
- Composers: Judy Rothman Rofe (lyrics); Andy Street; Nick Brown; Sandy Howell
- Country of origin: United States
- Original language: English
- No. of seasons: 4
- No. of episodes: 22 (40 segments) (list of episodes)

Production
- Executive producers: Andy Heyward; Michael Maliani; Kathy McConaughy; Mike Brown; Josef Mandelbaum; Jeffrey Conrad; Tamra Seldin; Jeff Weiss; David Polter
- Producer: Karren Brown
- Running time: 45 minutes
- Production companies: American Greetings; AG Properties; DIC Entertainment (Note: Animation outsourced to Hong Ying Universe Company Limited.)

Original release
- Release: March 11, 2003 – September 11, 2008

Related
- 1980s Strawberry Shortcake specials; Strawberry Shortcake's Berry Bitty Adventures (2009)

Strawberry Shortcake is an American children's musical preschool animated series produced by DIC Entertainment and American Greetings based on the franchise of the same name that premiered on March 11, 2003. The series consists of 45 episodes, plus one short and one feature film based on this incarnation. The series was broadcast on television by CBS, HBO, HBO Family, and in broadcast syndication. The entire cast is replaced with younger and lesser known voice actors compared to the 1980s Strawberry Shortcake animated specials.

Following the series' reboot in 2009, the 2003 series was succeeded by Strawberry Shortcake's Berry Bitty Adventures in 2010.

== Characters ==
=== Main ===
==== Humans ====
- Strawberry Shortcake (voiced by Sarah Heinke): The main protagonist of the series, she is a kind and sweet redhead who is always there for her friends and who often takes up a leader role.
- Angel Cake (voiced by Rachel Ware): A persnickety, blonde girl who can sometimes be a little bit perfectionist, wanting everything to be how she wants it, but still shows a good side.
- Ginger Snap (voiced by Samantha Triba): A talkative, clever inventor and baker (of unknown ethnicity), she can be quite quick and timid when her mood hits.
- Orange Blossom (voiced by DeJare Barfield): A happy and cheerful girl (of African-American ethnicity) who lives up to her name, although she can get a little shy and sensitive at times.
- Huckleberry Pie (voiced by Daniel Canfield (season 1) and James Street (seasons 2-4): An adventurous boy who enjoys skateboarding, but still makes sure his friends come first. By seasons 3-4, he switches to a recurring character. He wears a blue hat worn backward (seasons 1-3), and a red hat worn forward (season 4).

==== Pets ====
- Pupcake (vocal effects by Nils Haaland): Strawberry's pet dog, he is often very excited and playful, and can sometimes annoy Custard.
- Custard (voiced by Sarah Koslosky (season 1) and Anna Jordan (seasons 2-4): Strawberry's pet cat who has a snarky, sarcastic character. Unlike in past incarnations, she can speak and is able to translate Pupcake's barks into human language.

=== Recurring ===
==== Humans ====
- Apple Dumplin' (voiced by Katie Labosky): Strawberry's younger sister who wishes to be like her big sister, and hopes that she can do anything the older children do. By season 4, she ages up to a preteen.
- Blueberry Muffin (voiced by Bianca Heyward; Caroline lliff (in one episode of season 4)): A smart and creative girl who enjoys reading books and making up plays.
- Peppermint Fizz (voiced by Rebecca Noddle): A stubborn and highly-tempered girl who will do anything to get her way, but through it all, can still have a good heart and even feel remorseful for her accidents. By season 4, she becomes more light-hearted to Strawberry, wanting to be part of her group of friends.
- Seaberry Delight (voiced by Abby Leib): A shy ocean girl who lives in Seaberry Shore with Coco Calypso.
- Coco Calypso (voiced by Melissa Deni): A distant West Indian friend of Strawberry Shortcake who lives on Seaberry Island and likes to perform.
- Rainbow Sherbet (voiced by Laura Grimm): An adventurer and sailor who lives in a colorful boat dubbed the Rainbow Float, she earns a habit of speaking in a "sailor term" accent.
- Crepes Suzette (voiced by Caroline Iliff): Strawberry's friend from Pearis (fictional city in Europe) who is a fashion designer and is sometimes prone to being dramatic.
- Cherry Cuddler: Crepes' younger sister who only appeared in illustrations.
- Tea Blossom (voiced by Marissa Maliani): A quiet and reserved girl (of Asian ethnicity) from Plum Blossom Province who comes to visit Strawberryland, although she finds it difficult to adjust to their aesthetic.
- Tangerina Torta (voiced by Caroline lliff (season 3) and Dana Donlan (season 4)): An orange-haired Latin-American girl with a passion for nature. In season 4, she was redesigned and has a new accent.
- Frosty Puff (voiced by Samantha Triba): A winter-themed girl from a Nordic country called "Niceland".
- Raspberry Torte (voiced by Haley Hyden-Soffer): An active, athletic, and competitive girl who is not too fond of manners, but later starts to care about them. She is sometimes prone to having sarcastic remarks.
- Lemon Meringue (voiced by Mary Waltman): A sweet fashionista who can be a little ditzy at times and is usually seen with Raspberry Torte.
- Apricot: A new girl with low self-esteem, who lies about her upbringing in order to make friends.
- Banana Candy (voiced by Caroline Iliff): A workaholic from Banana Borough, who takes up many jobs alone as she is the only resident. She becomes good friends with Strawberry Shortcake after being invited on their trip.
- Watermelon Kiss: A new girl who likes all of the summer and riding horses.
- Plum Puddin' (voiced by Aubrey Fleming): A brainy, resourceful, and intelligent girl who is clumsy and has trouble finding her strengths, but can ultimately proves to be of great use to the team.
- Annie Oatmeal (voiced by Grace Bydalek): A cowgirl with a Southern accent who is also the owner of the Berry Prairie Dude Ranch. She is always looking for recruits who are also good friends.
- Caramel Corn (voiced by Anne Sundell): A resilient farm-girl with a passion for animals, who is trying to make ends meet so she does not have to sell her farm.
- Lime Light (voiced by Laurel Rothamel): A best-known superstar diva who likes to be in the center of attention, but never liked to listen to others. She finally tends to be less selfish and listen to others thanks to the title lead. Her director is voiced by Zoe Robb.

==== Pets ====
All the vocal effects for the pets aside from Cola's singing and Papaya are voiced by Nils Haaland.

- Vanilla Icing: Angel Cake's pet lamb.
- Chocolate Chipmunk: Ginger Snap's pet chipmunk.
- Marmalade: Orange Blossom's pet butterfly.
- Shoofly: Huckleberry Pie's pet frog.
- Apple Duckling: Apple Dumpling's pet duckling.
- Cheesecake: Blueberry Muffin's pet mouse.
- Cola Chameleon (singing voice by Mark Bennett): Peppermint Fizz's pet chameleon.
- Papaya Parrot (voiced by Susan Bear Collins): Coco Calypso's pet parrot.
- Kiwi: Seaberry Delight's pet sea turtle.
- Triple Ripple: Rainbow Sherbet's pet toucan.
- Eclair: Crepes Suzette's pet poodle.
- Gooseberry: Cherry Cuddler's pet goose.
- Freezer Pop: Frosty Puff's pet penguin.
- Marza Panda: Tea Blossom's pet panda.
- Banana Bongo: Tangerina Torta's pet monkey who is very funny.
- Rhubarb: Raspberry Torte's pet raccoon who only appears in merchandise.
- Sourball: Lemon Meringue's pet skunk.
- Hopsalot: Apricot's pet rabbit.
- Various Farm Animals: Cows, sheep, pigs, horses, hens and roosters owned by Annie Oatmeal and Caramel Corn.

==== Fillies and Dobbin ====
The 2003 series introduced a cast of fillies to the mix that the characters own.

- Honey Pie Pony (voiced by Hannah Koslosky): A horse from Ice Cream Island who is a good friend of the main characters and the leader of the fillies. She is the first and major filly to be introduced, and the only one of them who can speak human language. She likes all of adventures, but she also likes to ramble on about her greatest journeys and stories.
- Cookie Dough: Ginger Snap's filly, she enjoys eating cookies.
- Milkshake: Angel Cake's filly, she is shy and the fastest filly on the island.
- Orange Twist: Orange Blossom's filly.
- Cherry Vanilla: Peppermint Fizz's filly who only appears in merchandise. Compared to her more sour owner, Cherry Vanilla is more sweet-natured, akin to her name. She is sometimes paired with Strawberry Shortcake in some toy sets.
- Blueberry Sundae: Blueberry Muffin's filly who only appears in merchandise and made a brief cameo in the TV series.
- Huckleberry Hash: Huckleberry Pie's filly who only appeared in the toy range.
- Spumoni: Coco Calypso's filly who only appeared in the toy range.
- Pistachio: Seaberry Delight's filly who only appeared in the toy range.
- Butter Pecan: Rainbow Sherbet's who only appeared in the toy range.
- Lemon Ice: Lemon Meringue's filly who only appeared in the toy range.
- Raspberry Ripple: Raspberry Torte's filly who only appeared in the toy range.
- Ambrosia: A unicorn who only appeared in a picture book.
- Thunder: Plum Pudding's filly who appeared in the "Big Country Fun" segment/episode Back in the Saddle. They are a deep purple pony with a cropped lavender mane and tail and have been referred to as a male and a female throughout the episode.
- Dobbin: The equine, presumably a draft, who pulls the Purple Pieman's cart. Although not mentioned, it is implied that he is male.

==== Villains ====
- Licorice Whip (voiced by Jerry Longe): A rebellious and hot-headed circus worker and performer who steals Honey Pie Pony and the other fillies for his carnival's "big-top" show.
- Raven (voiced by Ryle Smith): Licorice Whip's sidekick, a usual black bird, although he soon turns against him and helps the girls save the fillies.
- Sea Serpent (voiced by Pam Carter): A sea serpent in a story who subjugate mermaids, but has a change of heart and makes up for her non-good deeds by the end of the story.
- Dog Catcher (voiced by Nils Haaland): An evil French man who attempts to capture Pupcake and Eclair, though it is unclear if he is really a villain, since he was just doing his job.
- Purple Pieman (voiced by Cork Ramer): An overly-ambitious and vicious baker who will do anything to get what he wants. During the last episode "Lights... Camera...", it is revealed that he is not fully cold-hearted and seems to show a much softer and helpful side when given the chance, ultimately leading him to reform.
- Sour Grapes (voiced by Bridget Robbins): Purple Pieman's sour and impassive sister who sometimes serves as a rational figure for her brother's mischief. She is also shown numerous times to be much more sympathetic and kind-hearted to the heroes.

==== Fairies ====
A series of Fairies appeared in "Berry Fairy Tales". The background fairies are voiced by Samantha Triba, Theresa Sindelar and Anna Jordan.

- Margalo B. Berryglow (voiced by Andrea Ware): A fairy who takes advantage of kindness.
- Sherry Bobbleberry (voiced by Laura Marr): A fairy who is doubtful of things but wishes to be seen as a hero.
- Periwinkle Pearblossom (voiced by Theresa Sindelar): Sherry's boss and the loyal fairy of the Queen, she is fair to the rules and can be quite anxious.
- Fairy Queen (voiced by Susie Baer Collins): The queen of the Strawberryland fairies, she is helpful and is happy to assist within any issues.

== Episodes ==
=== Game Boy Advance Video ===
Majesco has also released Strawberry Shortcake episodes as a Game Boy Advance Video cartridge:

Strawberry Shortcake Volume 1
- Meet Strawberry Shortcake
- Spring for Strawberry Shortcake
Note: The episodes released on Game Boy Advance Video are the 22-minute edited broadcast version of the episodes (some markets show these episodes as a two-part series without cutting off scenes instead), unlike the video versions which are 45 minutes in length each. Presumably this decision was made to keep the costs of producing the cartridges down (as the need for higher density memory chips would drive the cost of the cartridge up). As a result, two songs and a significant number of scenes from "Meet Strawberry Shortcake", as well as two songs and half of the scenes from "Spring for Strawberry Shortcake" were missing from the GBA Video release if compared to the other videos. Also notable is that the song Friendship Grows Like a Flower was shortened.

== Broadcast ==
=== United States ===
In the United States, although promoted as a direct-to-video series, the series did air on television as well.

In 2003, Season 1 gained one-off airings on HBO and its HBO Family.

In January 2006, shortened Season 1-2 episodes aired on Mondays within the Program B slot (which mainly aired on The CW affiliates) of the DIC Kids Network syndicated block. The series ran on the block until 2007, when it moved to KEWLopolis on CBS, with Season 3 episodes added in September 2008. In September 2009, it was removed from the block following its rebranding as Cookie Jar TV, but returned in April 2010 until September that year. Season 4 has never aired on television in the United States and remains exclusively on DVD and digital download.

=== Internationally ===
In international markets, DIC pre-sold the series to GMTV in the United Kingdom and Fox Kids Europe in some European territories in 2004. In 2008, DIC pre-sold the series to more broadcasters including M6, Canal J and TiJi in France, Tiny Pop in the United Kingdom, K-T.V. in South Africa, KiKa in Germany, Austria, Luxembourg and German-speaking Switzerland, Alter Channel in Greece and Mediaset in Italy. Season 1 episodes are broadcast as two parts instead of being shortened, doubling the episode count to eight. In Canada, the series aired on Treehouse TV.

From Season 2 onwards, the episodes are presented individually on the TV broadcasts rather than being compilations, although this depended on the broadcaster (e.g., Disney Channel Asia aired the first four episodes as two-parters).

Some networks, like GMTV and Minimax in CEE aired Season 1 uninterrupted as one, full-length part akin to the DVD releases, while Season 2 onwards are broadcast exactly like on the DVDs with the compilation format.

== Home media ==
20th Century Fox Home Entertainment began releasing the series direct-to-video in the United States starting in March 2003. The first few episodes were released on both VHS and DVD, and bundled with certain toys; later episodes were only released on DVD. They are also available on Video CD through various fourth-party licensees in Southeast Asia and in certain other markets. The first four videos contain only one story but run for twice the length of subsequent episodes.

From Season 2 onwards, the videotapes and DVDs are presented as "compilations" in which Strawberry recounts the featured adventures using her "remembering book" or for Season 4, showcases the featured stories as simple flashbacks.

22 Volumes (1 including the film) have been released for the series overall.

== Other media ==
A five-minute Strawberry Shortcake short, "Growing Better All the Time", is available exclusively in the Care Bears: Daydreams DVD (released on October 14, 2003) as a bonus feature. Numerous scenes from the short were used in the 2000s (decade) series' second opening sequence, and the song from the short was released on the "Strawberry Jams" CD. Additionally, a public service announcement for the ASPCA was produced and aired in the US. The PSA features Strawberry Shortcake talking about the basics of pet ownership.
