= Prospect Park Books =

Los Angeles-based independent publisher

- Founded: 2006
- Founder: Colleen Dunn Bates
- Country of origin: United States
- Headquarters location: Los Angeles, California
- Distribution: Consortium Book Sales & Distribution
- Key people: Colleen Dunn Bates, Patricia O'Sullivan
- Publication types: Books
- Fiction genres: Fiction, cookbooks, regional, humor
- Imprints: Prospect Park Books, Raymond Press, Spectrum Publications
- No. of employees: 4
- Official website: www.prospectparkbooks.com

Prospect Park Books was a Los Angeles–based independent publisher. Its titles are distributed by Consortium Book Sales & Distribution, a member of the Ingram Content Group. It is a member of the American Association of Publishers, Publishers Association of the West, the International Association of Culinary Professionals, and the Council of Literary Magazines and Presses. In January 2021, the company was acquired by Turner Publishing Company.

== Overview ==
Prospect Park Books was founded by Colleen Dunn Bates in 2006 with a focus on regional titles, including Hometown Pasadena and EAT: Los Angeles. both of which led to online magazines, Eat-LA.com and Hometown-Pasadena.com. In 2012, Prospect Park Books sold Hometown-Pasadena.com and greatly expanded its book line.

== Notable publications ==
Prospect Park Books' notable books include: Little Flower Baking by Christine Moore, the SCIBA Best Nonfiction title of 2016; Little Flower: Recipes from the Cafe, which was chosen as one of the best cookbooks of 2012 by Food52.com; After Abel & Other Stories by Michal Lemberger, a Sophie Brody Medal finalist and Jewish Book Council honoree; Sayonara Slam, Strawberry Yellow and Blood Hina by Naomi Hirahara, the fourth, fifth and sixth installments in the Mas Arai mystery series; Mark Twain's Guide to Diet, Exercise, Beauty, Fashion, Investment, Romance, Health and Happiness by journalist and Mark Twain scholar Mark Dawidziak; and Helen of Pasadena, a novel by Lian Dolan (one of the Satellite Sisters), which spent more than a year on the Los Angeles Times bestseller list.
