= Mary Waltman =

American actress

- Born: Mary Waltman
- Occupations: Voice and theatrical actress
- Notable credit: Lemon Meringue in Strawberry Shortcake

Mary Waltman is an American actress who is best known as the voice of the character Lemon Meringue in the series Strawberry Shortcake from 2003. She reprised the role in the film Strawberry Shortcake: The Sweet Dreams Movie in 2006. She has also done some voice work for the series Horseland. She currently resides in Los Angeles, California. Waltman currently attends the University of Alabama as a musical theatre major.
