= Marcus Pfister =

Swiss author

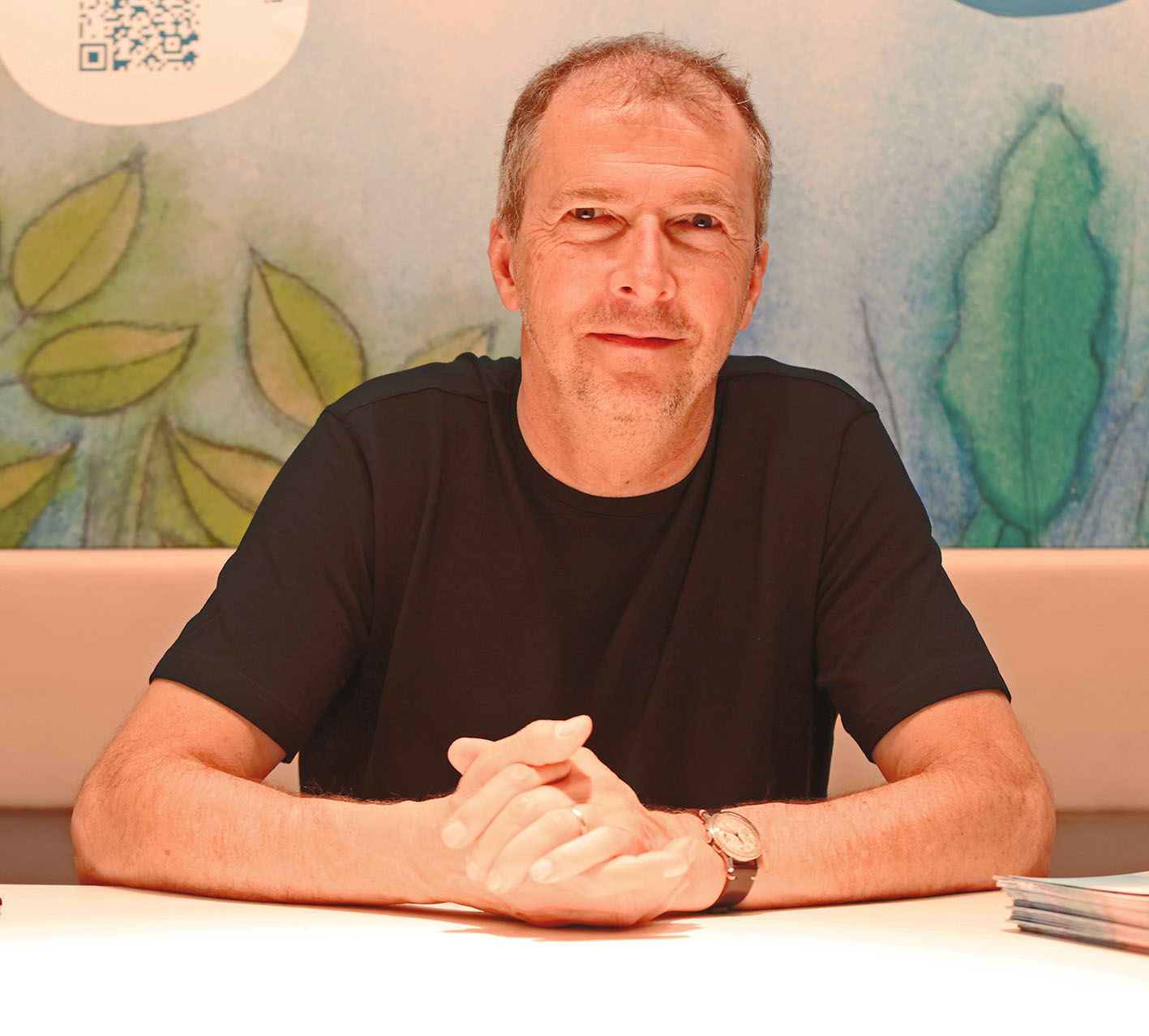
- Pfister at Frankfurter Buchmesse 2022
- Born: July 30, 1960 (age 65) Bern, Switzerland
- Occupation: Author, Illustrator
- Period: 1986–present
- Genre: Children’s Literature

Marcus Pfister (born 30 July 1960 in Bern, Switzerland) is a Swiss author and illustrator of children's picture books.

His Rainbow Fish series of children's picture books, published since 1992, has been a worldwide success. The books have been translated into over 60 languages and have sold over 30 million copies. Decode Entertainment turned the picture books into a 26-episode animated television series of the same name, which has aired on the HBO Family television channel in the United States since 2000.

Pfister uses watercolors to illustrate his children's books, beginning by stretching the watercolor paper over a wooden board. Next, Pfister copies his rough sketches onto the paper in pencil. He is then ready to begin painting. For his backgrounds and blended contours, Pfister uses wet paint on wet paper; this achieves a softer effect. For the finer details, he first lets the painting dry, and then he paints the final picture layer by layer. When the illustration is complete, Pfister cuts the paper from the wooden board.

In February 2017, Pfister was the featured speaker, author, and illustrator at Nepal’s first children's literature festival, Bal Sahitya Mahotsav, in Kathmandu.

Pfister lives with his wife, Debora, in Bern, Switzerland.

== Bibliography ==
- Wer ist mein Freund?, 1986
  - Who is My Friend?
- Die müde Eule, 1986
  - The Sleepy Owl
- Die vier Lichter des Hirten Simon, 1986
  - Four Candles for Simon
- Pinguin Pit, 1987
  - Penguin Pete
- Wie Sankt Nikolaus einen Gehilfen fand, 1987
  - Santa Claus and the Woodcutter
- Kamillas weiter Weg, 1987
  - Camomile Heads for Home
- Pits neue Freunde, 1988
  - Pete's New Friends
- Biber Boris, 1988
  - Boris Beaver
- Pit und Pat, 1989
  - Penguin Pete and Pat
- Mirjam's Geschenk, 1989
  - Miriam’s Gift
- Zottels Hundeleben, 1990
  - Shaggy
- Sonne und Mond, 1990
  - Sun and Moon
- Hoppel, 1991
  - Hopper
- Weißt du wieviel Sternlein stehen?, 1991
  - I See the Moon
- Hoppel findet einen Freund, 1992
  - Hopper Hunts for Spring
- Der Regenbogenfisch, 1992
  - Rainbow Fish
- Hoppel und der Osterhase, 1993
  - Hopper's Easter Surprise
- Pit ahoy!, 1993
  - Penguin Pete, Ahoy!
- Der Weihnachtsstern, 1993
  - The Christmas Star
- Papa Pit und Tim, 1994
  - Penguin Pete and Little Tim
- Till & Willy, 1994
  - Chris & Croc
- Der kleine Dino, 1994
  - Dazzle the Dinosaur
- Hoppel lernt schwimmen, 1995
  - Hang On, Hopper!
- Regenbogenfisch, komm hilf mir!, 1995
  - Rainbow Fish to the Rescue!
- Lieber Nikolaus, wann kommst du?, 1996
  - Wake Up, Santa Claus!
- Hoppel weiss sich zu helfen, 1997
  - Hopper’s Treetop Adventure
- Mats und die Wundersteine, 1997
  - Milo and the Magical Stones
- Wie Leo wieder König wurde, 1998
  - How Leo Learned to Be King
- Der Regenbogenfisch stiftet Frieden, 1998
  - Rainbow Fish and the Big Blue Whale
- Kleiner Bär ich wünsch dir was, 1999
  - Make a Wish, Honey Bear
- Der glückliche Mischka, 2000
  - The Happy Hedgehog
- Mats und die Streifenmäuse, 2000
  - Milo and the Mysterious Island
- Hallo Freund!!!, 2001
  - Just The Way You Are
- Der Regenbogenfisch hat keine Angst mehr, 2001
  - Rainbow Fish and the Sea Monster's Cave
- Der Regenbogenfisch lernt zählen, 2001
  - Rainbow Fish ABC
- Das Regenbogenfisch-Puzzlebuch, 2002
  - Rainbow Fish Puzzle Book
- Das magische Buch, 2003
  - The Magic Book
- Henri der Künstler, 2004
  - Henri, Egg Artiste
- Timo und Matto, 2006
  - Holey Moley
- Ein Glücksstern für Lukas, 2005
  - Aaron’s Secret Message
- Der Regenbogenfisch kehrt zurück, 2006
  - Rainbow Fish Finds His Way
- Charly im Zoo, 2007
  - Charlie at the Zoo
- Spiel mit Charly, 2008
  - Copycat Charlie
- Ab ins Bett, Nils!, 2008
  - Bertie at Bedtime
- Monster-Party, 2008
  - The Friendly Monsters
- Der Regenbogenfisch entdeckt die Tiefsee, 2009
  - Rainbow Fish Discovers the Deep Sea
- Wenn du mal groß bist, Nils!, 2009
  - Bertie: Just Like Daddy
- Himmlische Weihnachtsfahrt, 2009
- Happy Birthday, Nils!, 2010
  - Happy Birthday, Bertie!
- Der kleine Mondrabe, 2010
  - The Little Moonraven, 2014
- Was macht die Farben bunt?, 2011
- Questions, Questions
- Filu im Schnee, 2011
  - Snow Puppy
- Lisas Mohnblume, 2012
- Dr Samichlous under dr Duschi, 2012
- Jack im Regenwald, 2013
  - The Yellow Cab
- Mein kunterbuntes Tier ABC, 2013
  - Animal ABC'
- Weisst du, was Glück ist?, 2014
  - Happiness is...
- Tock! Tock! Darf ich bei dir schlafen?, 2014
- 1,2,3 - Wo sind die kleinen Küken?, 2014

== Awards ==
- 1988: Schweizer Jugendbuchpreis, Nominationlist
- 1992: Christopher Award
- 1993: Critici in Erba Prize
- 1993: 1. Prize Ulmer Bilderbuchspatz
- 1993: Prix spécial des Libraires religieux pour le livre d'enfant, Valence
- 1994: Prix de la Jeunesse, Cherbourg
- 1995: North Dakota Flicker Tale
- 1995: ABBY-Award
- 1995: North Carolina Children's Book Award
- 1996: Readers' Choice Award, Michigan Reading Association
- 1996: Children's Choices (IRA-CBC)
- 1997: Christopher Award
- 1997: Steirische Leseeule
- 1998: Storytelling World Award
