= Strawberry Shortcake's Berry Bitty Adventures =

Children's television series

- Based on: Characters by American Greetings
- Directed by: Bob Hathcock
- Voices of: Anna Cummer; Andrea Libman; Janyse Jaud; Britt McKillip; Ingrid Nilson; Ashleigh Ball; Shannon Chan-Kent; Aidan Drummond; Diana Kaarina; Rebecca Shoichet
- Theme music composer: Chip Whitewood; Ashley Saunig
- Composers: Marco Luciani; Chip Whitewood
- Country of origin: United States
- Original language: English
- No. of seasons: 4
- No. of episodes: 65 (list of episodes)

Production
- Executive producers: Jeffrey Conrad (seasons 1–3); Sarah Finn (seasons 1–3); David Polter (season 1); Sean Gorman (season 4); Ryan Wiesbrock (season 4)
- Producer: Ciara Anderson (seasons 3-4)
- Running time: 22 minutes
- Production company: American Greetings

Original release
- Network: Discovery Family (Note: Known as The Hub/Hub Network until October 13, 2014.)
- Release: October 10, 2010 – September 12, 2015

Related
- Strawberry Shortcake (2003); Strawberry Shortcake: Berry in the Big City

Strawberry Shortcake's Berry Bitty Adventures is an American animated children's television series based on the Strawberry Shortcake franchise and functions as the third iteration of the franchise overall, following the 1980s specials, and the second television series after its 2003 relaunch. Produced by American Greetings with animation provided by Splash Entertainment, (Note: Known as MoonScoop Entertainment for the first three seasons. Animation outsourced to GDC International.) the series follows the adventures of Strawberry Shortcake and her friends who live in the fictional land of Berry Bitty City, a tiny, miniature world located beneath a strawberry patch.

== Characters ==
=== Main ===
- Strawberry Shortcake (speaking voice by Anna Cummer and singing voice by Tracey Moore): The main protagonist of the series and the leader of the Berry girl group in pink and green, she is a chef and the owner of Berry Bitty Café, where she creates delightful dishes and drinks for her customers. She is always ready to lend a helping hand and tends to bring peace with the others in Berry Bitty City.
- Orange Blossom (voiced by Janyse Jaud): A store clerk and owner of the Orange Mart store, she is clever, brave, energetic, and athletic, but also tends to jump ahead without thinking things through and she is so extremely organized that she has a hard time accepting help at times.
- Lemon Meringue (voiced by Andrea Libman): A hairstylist and the owner of the Lemon Salon, she is creative, stylish, feminine, and loves to gossip. She is a quick thinker who can fix any hair problem, such as a bad hair day, although she can be very dramatic.
- Blueberry Muffin (voiced by Britt McKillip): A librarian, bookseller, and the owner of the Blueberry Books bookstore, she is smart, intelligent, diligent, and believes things should be done by the book. Despite her good manners, she can be obsessive, stubborn, bossy, and occasionally temperamental.
- Raspberry Torte (voiced by Ingrid Nilson): A fashion designer and the owner of the Fresh Fashions Boutique, she is fashionable, friendly, polite, and cares a lot about her fashions as much as her best friend Lemon.
- Plum Pudding (voiced by Ashleigh Ball): A dance instructor and the owner of the Sweet Beats Studio, she is active, charming, humorous, rowdy, kind-hearted, and believes that there is something to dance about. Her competitive nature, however, forces her to overcome her temper.
- Cherry Jam (speaking voice by Shannon Chan-Kent and singing voice by Victoria Duffield): A musician and singer who joins the cast in the second season. With Strawberry being her biggest fan, she decides to take a vacation to Berry Bitty City to escape from her superstar popularity, and eventually decides to stay instead of returning to Stardom. She likes to sing duets with the other girls.
- Huckleberry Pie (voiced by Aidan Drummond): A pet adopter who was introduced in the third season, he owns a pet adoption centre in Berry Big City, and travels to Berry Bitty City in his Pup Mobile, getting dogs adopted. Most of the girls have adopted their puppies from Huckleberry. He is very socially awkward but enjoys good mysteries like Blueberry.
- Sweet Grapes (voiced by Andrea Libman): Introduced in the fourth season with her older twin sister Sour Grapes, she is a chef who hails from a faraway place and was hired by Strawberry to work at the Berry Bitty Café. She has a kind personality and likes creating sweet goods.
- Sour Grapes (voiced by Diana Kaarina): Introduced in the fourth season with her younger twin sister Sweet Grapes, she is a chef who hails from a faraway place and was hired by Strawberry to work at the Berry Bitty Café. She has a tart, rude, competitive and sardonic personality who can erupt at any given moment, but she is ultimately a good friend, and prefers to make "spicy" goods. She often thinks her sister can be annoyingly pleasant at times.
- Apple Dumplin (voiced by Rebecca Shoichet): A world traveler and engineer from Strawberryland who arrives at Berry Bitty City to visit her older cousin Strawberry before deciding to stay there permanently. Though kind and willing to lend a helping hand, she can be boisterous and impulsive.

=== Recurring/Minor ===
==== Berrykins ====
- Princess Berrykin (speaking voice by Andrea Libman and singing voice by Shannon Chan-Kent): A Strawberry Berrykin who is the ruler of Berry Bitty City.
- Berrykin Bloom (voiced by Paul Dobson): A Strawberry Berrykin who is the oldest resident in all of Berry Bitty City. He likes attending gardens, growing fruit, and is not fussy over anything.
- Baby Berrykin (voiced by Andrea Libman): An infant Strawberry Berrykin who appears with other Baby Berrykins, he is usually curious about his surroundings. In one episode, he is seen to be quite troublesome and has the power to change colors.
- Berrykin Becky (voiced by Kathleen Barr): A Strawberry Berrykin who handles mechanical engineering and painting, she first appears in the series' second season.
- Berrykin Bill (voiced by Paul Dobson): A Plum Berrykin who handles construction work, he first appears in the series' second season.
- Berrykin Bruce (voiced by Sam Vincent): A Blueberry Berrykin who specializes in mechanism engineering, he first appears in the series' second season.
- Berrykin Bertram: A Plum Berrykin who works as Mavis Maraschino's assistant, although she treats him the same way as she does with everyone else.
- Berrykin Ed (voiced by Scott McNeil): A Plum Berrykin who specializes in mechanism engineering, carpentry and construction, he can be quite loud and confident.
- Berrykin Earl (voiced by Sam Vincent): A Blueberry Berrykin who always works with Berrykin Ed. Compared to him, he is quite cowardly and is also quite shy and hesitant.
- Berrykin Bonnie (voiced by Shannon Chan-Kent): A young Strawberry Berrykin who appears in two episodes of the third season.
- Berrykin Race Official (voiced by Diana Kaarina): A Lemon Berrykin who officiates the race told in Apple's story about the Berry Big Race. She only appears in one episode of the fourth season.
- Berrykin Bertram (voiced by Paul Dobson): A Blueberry Berrykin who is Berrykin Bloom's stuck-up and cheating cousin, who resorts to dirty tricks to win what he wants. He only appears in one episode of the fourth season.
- Queen of Berryvania (voiced by Kathleen Barr): A Plum Berrykin, she first appears in the series' fourth season.

==== Berry Bitty City residents ====
- Mr. Longface (voiced by Paul Dobson): A calm, carefree caterpillar who enjoys intricacies and art, and runs Berry Bitty City's golf course. His wise, knowledgeable personality can sometimes lead to problems. He knows words that only Blueberry can understand.
- Bosley Bookworm (voiced by Paul Dobson): A worm who works as an assistant at the Blueberry Bookstore and likes helping Blueberry get the books she needs.
- Jadeybug (voiced by Nicole Oliver): A ladybug who works as a clerk at the Post Office, she can be quite forgetful at times but still tries the best she can.
- Kadiebug (voiced by Ingrid Nilson) and Sadiebug (voiced by Janyse Jaud): Two ladybugs who are Jadeybug's younger twin cousins. Whenever they visit they are incredibly rude, mischievous and frequently get into arguments with each other over the pettiest things.
- Postmaster Bumblebee (voiced by Scott McNeil): A bumblebee who operates the Post Office and occasionally does mail duties himself.
- Doctor Hazel Nutby (voiced by Nicole Oliver): A squirrel who functions as the doctor of Berry Bitty City, she only appeared in one episode.
- Mavis Maraschino (voiced by Kathleen Barr): A pink ladybug introduced in the series' second season, who works as a fashion hostess. She is quite snobby, egotistical and prefers what she wants in fashion.

==== Pets ====
- Custard: Strawberry's pet cat, she is friendly, playful and point things out of what others have missed. She also loves helping out her owner with things. She can also be quite skittish at times.
- Pupcake (also known by his alter ego Butler Pupcake): Strawberry's pet puppy, he is a beagle who can be quite curious about his surroundings, energetic, and makes sure to be a good help, even if it is done unknowingly.
- Tom Tom: Huckleberry's pet puppy, he is a coonhound, and is the mature, responsible leader of the pups. He enjoys the company of other humans. He first appears in the series' third season, as with Huckleberry Pie.
- Marmalade: Orange's pet puppy, she is a long-haired orange dachshund who can be quite mischievous. She sometimes falls asleep like Cinnapup. She first appears in the series' third season.
- Henna: Lemon's pet puppy, she is a pigtailed yellow Cocker Spaniel who is quite delicate and scared, but loves being groomed by Lemon. She first appears in the series' third season.
- Scouty (also known by his alter ego Officer Scouty): Blueberry's pet puppy, he is a blue Border Collie who is quite playful and is always up for a challenge, but can get distracted sometimes. He first appears in the series' third season.
- Chiffon: Raspberry's pet puppy, she is a purple chihuahua who is timid and quiet, but enjoys being accessorized by Raspberry. She first appears in the series' third season.
- Pitterpatch (also known by his alter ego King Pitterpatch): Plum's pet puppy, he is a white and plum Parson Russell Terrier who likes to try out new tricks. He can sometimes get wound up. He is also Scouty's best friend. He first appears in the series' third season.
- Cinnapup (also known by her alter ego as Chef Cinnapup): Cherry's pet puppy, she is a pink dalmatian who is quite noisy and enjoys singing, just like her owner, though she may be more tomboyish than Cherry. She also likes falling asleep sometimes. She first appears in the series' third season.
- Teatime: Apple's pet turtle and best friend, he tends to look out for Apple and loves to help her out. He first appears in the series' fourth season, as with Apple.

== Episodes ==
Season	Episodes	Originally released	
Season	Episodes	First released	Last released
1	26	October 10, 2010	November 15, 2010
2	13	November 5, 2011	March 24, 2012
3	13	February 23, 2013	May 11, 2013
4	13	June 20, 2015	September 12, 2015

== Film ==
The Strawberry Shortcake Movie: Sky's the Limit is a 2009 film that began the series. It is also known as the pilot for the Berry Bitty Adventures series.

== Merchandise ==
To coincide with the relaunch of the franchise, a toy line was produced by Hasbro and later The Bridge Direct, which were both known simply as "Strawberry Shortcake".

== Broadcast ==
The series first premiered outside of the United States (as with The Twisted Whiskers Show). In February 2010, American Greetings pre-sold the series to Playhouse Disney and M6 in France, Cartoonito in the UK, Hop! Channel in Israel, and Playhouse Disney in Canada and Latin America.

In Latin America, the series aired first on Disney Junior (formerly "Playhouse Disney") from September 2010 until around 2013 and later on Discovery Kids from November 2014 until around 2017.

The series made its English debut on The Hub (currently known as Discovery Family) in 2010. It also aired in Spanish on Discovery Familia. The series was previously shown in Canada on Family Jr., but was removed from the channel's lineup in 2020.

Streaming-wise, it is available on Paramount+, and for free on places such as Pluto TV and Tubi.

== Home media ==
In the United States, as with the 2003 series, 20th Century Fox Home Entertainment also distributed DVDs of this series. Season 2 is the only season completely released on DVD, as the rest of the seasons are all missing an episode. Later DVDs also included digital download codes.

In France, M6 Video released the series onto DVD, including complete series boxsets.
