= The Rainbow Fish =

Swiss book and television series

- Original German cover
- Author: Marcus Pfister
- Illustrator: Marcus Pfister
- Language: German; English
- Genre: Children's book (illustrated)
- Publisher: NordSüd Verlag
- Publication date: 1992
- Publication place: Switzerland
- ISBN: 978-3314015441

The Rainbow Fish (German: Der Regenbogenfisch) is a children's picture book drawn and written by Swiss author and illustrator Marcus Pfister; it was translated into English by J. Alison James. The book is best known for the distinctive shiny foil scales of the Rainbow Fish. Decode Entertainment turned the story into an animated television series of the same name, which aired on the HBO Family television channel in the United States and Teletoon in Canada from 1999 until 2000.

The central message of the book is that a child who is fortunate must share with others to fit a social context. In the United States, although the book initially sold well, it has been criticized widely, leading the book to be removed by parents, for instance in Australia, based on its "toxic message".

== Plot ==
The story is about a small rainbowfish with shiny, multi-colored scales, unlike the other fish from his shoal. (However, besides his blue, green, violet/purple, and pink scales, he had shiny silver scales among them.) One day, a small bluefish (named Blue in the TV series) who envied the shiny scales asks the Rainbow Fish if he could have one of his silver scales. The Rainbow Fish responds and refuses in a rude manner. The small blue fish tells the other fish about the Rainbow Fish's harshness, and as a result, the other fish do not want to play with him anymore.

His only remaining friend, the starfish, tells him to go visit the wise octopus (named Wanda in the TV series) for advice. When he goes to the cave where she lives, she says she has been waiting for him and that the waves have told her his story. She then advises that the Rainbow Fish must share his scales with the other fish. She continues that if he shares his scales, he may no longer be the most beautiful fish, but he should "discover how to be happy". The Rainbow Fish tries to say that he cannot share his favorite scales, but Wanda disappears in a cloud of ink.

When he encounters the small blue fish again, the Rainbow Fish shares one of his precious silver scales and sees the little fish's joy. Though one of his shiny scales is gone, he immediately feels much better. Very soon, the Rainbow Fish is surrounded by the other fish requesting scales, and he shares one with each of them. Soon, everyone in the ocean has one shiny silver scale (including the Rainbow Fish). (All his scales were gone – all but one.) Even though he gave away all his silver scales and only had one left, the Rainbow Fish is finally happy.

== Theme ==
Its central theme is about the importance of sharing with others and how that leads to happiness. Publishers Weekly described the book as a "cautionary tale about selfishness and vanity". Alternatively, the central theme has been criticized for glorifying peer pressure and demanding that you give up all that makes you a unique individual in order to appease the envy of others. It is a cautionary tale about bullying, envy, and ostracism being used to selfishly take without due care for the individual being taken from. The book has been criticized by Reason magazine for "promoting socialism" and "collectivist" values in a children's book, with some saying that "...[the Rainbow Fish] only gets truly ostracized because he won't hand over his body parts on demand, in the name of equality."

== Origin ==
The Rainbow Fish was originally published in 1992 by Swiss book publisher NordSüd Verlag. At that time, Marcus Pfister suggested using holographic foil for the scales, a technique used in graphic design but not yet seen in children's books. Pfister said in an interview, "The expense was a big issue. Because of the foil, each copy of the book cost double the amount of the normal price of producing a book. With the cost, it was quite difficult for Davy [the editor] to decide whether to do the foil. So we decided that I’d get only 50% of my usual royalties for the book, and only that way was it possible to make it work."

The Rainbow Fish was developed from another book Pfister had previously illustrated, The Sleepy Owl. In an interview with Publishers Weekly, Pfister said, "Well, I had published some other books after The Sleepy Owl – there were some Christmas books and Penguin Pete – but Brigitte Sidjanski, founder of NordSüd, had always liked my first book, and suggested I do another book similar to that. So I thought that if a new book was to have something in common with that book, the character should resemble an owl. But I really didn’t want to draw another bird. Then one day, I had a copy of The Sleepy Owl by my desk, and I looked closely at that character, and I realized I could create a fish character that would be quite similar to the owl. So the feathers became scales. And then I began thinking about the story, and I came up with the idea of a colorful fish."

In an interview with Publishers Weekly, Marcus Pfister said "while I was at the Art School of Bern, I came to know about all the major Swiss children’s book illustrators. The other students and I would talk about how nice it would be to illustrate children’s books. At that point it was a dream, and only a few guys tried to realize this dream."

== Book series ==
There are at least eight sequels in The Rainbow Fish book series. In addition, there is a Spanish language edition of The Rainbow Fish, El Pez Arco Iris, as well as bilingual editions in English paired with Spanish, Arabic, Chinese, Japanese, Korean, French, German, Italian, Russian, and Vietnamese.

Five Rainbow Fish stories, The Rainbow Fish; Rainbow Fish and the Big Blue Whale; Rainbow Fish Discovers the Deep Sea; You Can’t Win Them All, Rainbow Fish; and Good Night, Little Rainbow Fish are featured in the collection, The Rainbow Fish and His Friends.

== Feature film ==
In June 2026 it was reported that an puppet feature based on the book was in development for a November release, in a collaboration between StudioCanal, Claussen+Putz Filmproduktion and Zodiac Pictures.

== Television series ==
The Rainbow Fish was adapted into a children's animated television series in 1999. However, the television series does not follow the plot of the book; rather it takes the character and the setting and creates a new story with them. Some characters were added and others embellished for the purposes of the show. In the series, the place where the fish live is called Neptune Bay (after Neptune, god of the sea). The fish attend school, which is aptly named "The School of Fish". There is a shipwreck called "Shipwreck Park" in the series that resembles the wreck of the RMS Titanic. It was produced by Canadian television studio Decode Entertainment, German children's entertainment group EM.TV & Merchandising and American company Sony Wonder. 26 episodes were produced.

== Reception ==
In the June 2019 issue of Reason magazine, libertarian journalist Matt Welch wrote an article titled "Don't Be Like the Rainbow Fish", in which he described the ways in which the Rainbow Fish in the book acted quite differently from that of the author of the book, Marcus Pfister, in Welch's view. Welch derides the process in which the Rainbow Fish in the book gave away its scales, and become "colorless", as contrasting starkly with the colorful methods and materials Pfister himself would have used in order to produce the actual book, which ultimately went on to sell millions of copies. Welch said, "Whereas Rainbow Fish achieves transcendence through literally becoming colorless, the exact opposite was the case for The Rainbow Fish. Using an expensive and novel combination of holographic foil stamping and watercolor, the Swiss-born Pfister and his publisher, NorthSouth Books, produced a striking visual package that proved irresistible.

Former conservative radio host Neal Boortz said that The Rainbow Fish in his view was, "...one of the biggest pieces of trash children's books ever published" for the similar reasons to that of Welch, as Welch states in the Reason article, "...[the Rainbow Fish] only gets truly ostracized because he won't hand over his body parts on demand, in the name of equality." In 2020, playwright Topher Payne released an alternate ending for the book, titled The Rainbow Fish Keeps His Scales, with art in the style of the original. In Payne's version, after being advised to give up his scales, the Rainbow Fish meets a catfish who advises him that, rather than "diminish[ing] himself to please others," he should "build up others with kindness." Payne subsequently explained that he discovered The Rainbow Fish as an adult, and was "repelled" by the octopus's advice: "I was a queer kid growing up in Mississippi (...) I was told you had to make yourself more palatable to others by making yourself less."

The Rainbow Fish has sold over 30 million copies internationally, and has been released in 50 languages (currently available in 37).

From Romper: "The Rainbow Fish follows a little fish in the ocean, but, as readers learn, this isn't just an average, everyday fish, it's “the most beautiful fish in the entire ocean.” Unlike ordinary fish, this one has gorgeous, sparkly scales in various shades of beautiful colors. The fish could keep all of his beauty to himself, but instead, he shares it with his friends and feels immense joy in doing so. This book is full of gorgeous artwork."

The late Ernest Borgnine read The Rainbow Fish as part of Storyline Online. Model Winnie Harlow read The Rainbow Fish as part of the #SavewithStories program led by Jennifer Garner.
