= Randy Meeks =

Fictional character in the Scream franchise

- Scream character
- Jamie Kennedy as Randy Meeks in Scream 2
- First appearance: Scream; (1996)
- Last appearance: Scream 3; (2000)
- Created by: Kevin Williamson
- Portrayed by: Jamie Kennedy

In-universe information
- Gender: Male
- Occupation: High school student (formerly); Video store clerk (formerly); College student
- Significant others: Karen Kolchak (one night stand); Sidney Prescott (crush)
- Relatives: Martha Meeks (sister); Mindy Meeks-Martin (niece); Chad Meeks-Martin (nephew)
- Location: Woodsboro, California, US; Windsor College, Ohio, US
- Status: Deceased

Randall "Randy" Meeks is a fictional character in the Scream franchise. Randy first appears in Scream (1996) as a high school student with a passion for the horror genre. He is portrayed by Jamie Kennedy. A self-professed "geek", Randy provides comic relief during his appearances throughout the franchise, using his in-depth knowledge of horror film plots and clichés to define the series of murders that occur in the franchise. Director Wes Craven fought for Kennedy's casting for the film, as the studio planned for a bigger name to take the role. Despite Kennedy's lack of experience, Craven got his way, citing that actor Johnny Depp was not a big name when cast in A Nightmare on Elm Street.

The character of Randy is known for breaking down the rules of surviving a horror film. In the first film, he lists the rules as being that you must never have sex, consume drugs or alcohol, or say "I'll be right back" when leaving a room. While Randy survives the events of the first Scream, he is killed off in its 1997 sequel, Scream 2, in a controversial decision that screenwriter Kevin Williamson would eventually admit regret over. Randy would make a cameo in Scream 3 in the form of a pre-recorded video message left for Sidney Prescott.

== Appearances ==
Randy appears in Scream in 1996 and Scream 2 in 1997. In the second film, the character is murdered by Nancy Loomis as Ghostface. He also makes a posthumous appearance in Scream 3 in the form of a videotape.

=== Scream ===
Randy made his cinematic debut in Scream on December 18, 1996. In the film, he is a high school student and a close friend of Sidney Prescott, Billy Loomis, Tatum Riley, and Stu Macher. Randy stands out as the only member of the group who is not in a romantic relationship, earning him the moniker of the "fifth wheel".

Following the murders of Steve Orth and Casey Becker by Ghostface, Randy tells Stu he believes Billy is the killer. After Stu tells him he thinks it is Sidney's father, Randy says everyone is a suspect before Billy reassures him that he isn't the murderer.

Randy attends a party thrown by Stu, where, while watching Halloween, he breaks down the rules to survive a horror film – those being that you must never have sex, never take drugs or drink alcohol, and never say "I'll be right back". After they hear about the murder of their school's principal, the majority of party guests leave, except Randy, who continues watching Halloween alone. A now-drunk Randy is then nearly murdered by Ghostface without realizing he is there. He leaves the house, only to be knocked out by Gale Weathers after unintentionally scaring her.

During the finale, Randy is accused by Stu of being the murderer before being shot in the shoulder by Billy, knocking him out. Randy later wakes up, having survived being shot, to see that Gale has shot Billy, who is now lying on the ground motionless. Randy warns Sidney and Gale that in horror movies, there is always a moment where the supposedly deceased killer inexplicably comes back to life for one more scare. Billy wakes up before Sidney shoots him in the head, killing him.

=== Scream 2 ===
Having survived the events of the previous film, Randy is now studying film at Windsor College, the same school Sidney attends, where he joined a new friend group consisting of himself, Sidney, Hallie McDaniel, and Derek Feldman – Sidney's new boyfriend. Randy and his classmates discuss the merit of sequels, where he argues that they are unnecessary. Randy later explains the rules of surviving a horror movie to Dewey Riley, this time in relation to a sequel – those being that more people will die, and that they will do so in more bloody ways, before being cut off by Dewey playfully accusing him as a suspect. Dewey and Randy meet up with Gale and Joel Martin. When Joel leaves, they receive a phone call with Ghostface on the other end. He teases Randy, telling him he will only ever be the geeky side character, before grabbing Randy when he walks in front of a van with no one noticing. Randy is stabbed to death by Ghostface, later revealed to be Nancy Loomis, with his body being discovered in the van by Dewey, Gale, and Joel.

=== Other appearances ===
In Scream 3, Randy leaves behind a video message for his younger sister Martha, explaining his belief that his recorded words will serve as his legacy in case he doesn't survive another killing spree. He warns that if another unexpected background emerges in a third spree, it would mark the culmination of a trilogy, where established rules would no longer apply. The killings would take on new, deceptive forms, and Sidney would confront her past in unexpected ways. Randy expresses his hope for Sidney's survival, despite the odds stacked against her according to the rules he outlines.

In the fourth Ghostface killing spree, committed by Jill Roberts and Charlie Walker, the then-unknown Ghostface accomplice, Walker tried to become the new generation's Randy Meeks. The horror buff character Robbie Mercer also resembles Randy.

When the third attack spree hits Woodsboro High School in Scream (2022), Randy's niece, Mindy Meeks-Martin, along with her twin brother Chad, suggests meeting at her place to discuss the events. In Mindy's home, there's a shrine dedicated to Randy, now inherited by Mindy. After the gathering, Mindy remains glued to the TV, watching Stab, the film that mirrors the events her uncle experienced. As the scene where Randy almost faces an attack plays out, Mindy realizes the chilling similarity as the killer approaches her in real life, just as they did with Randy. Unlike her uncle, Mindy reacts swiftly, turning in time to confront the impending danger. Despite being stabbed and losing consciousness, both she and Chad survive.

== Development ==
=== Conception ===
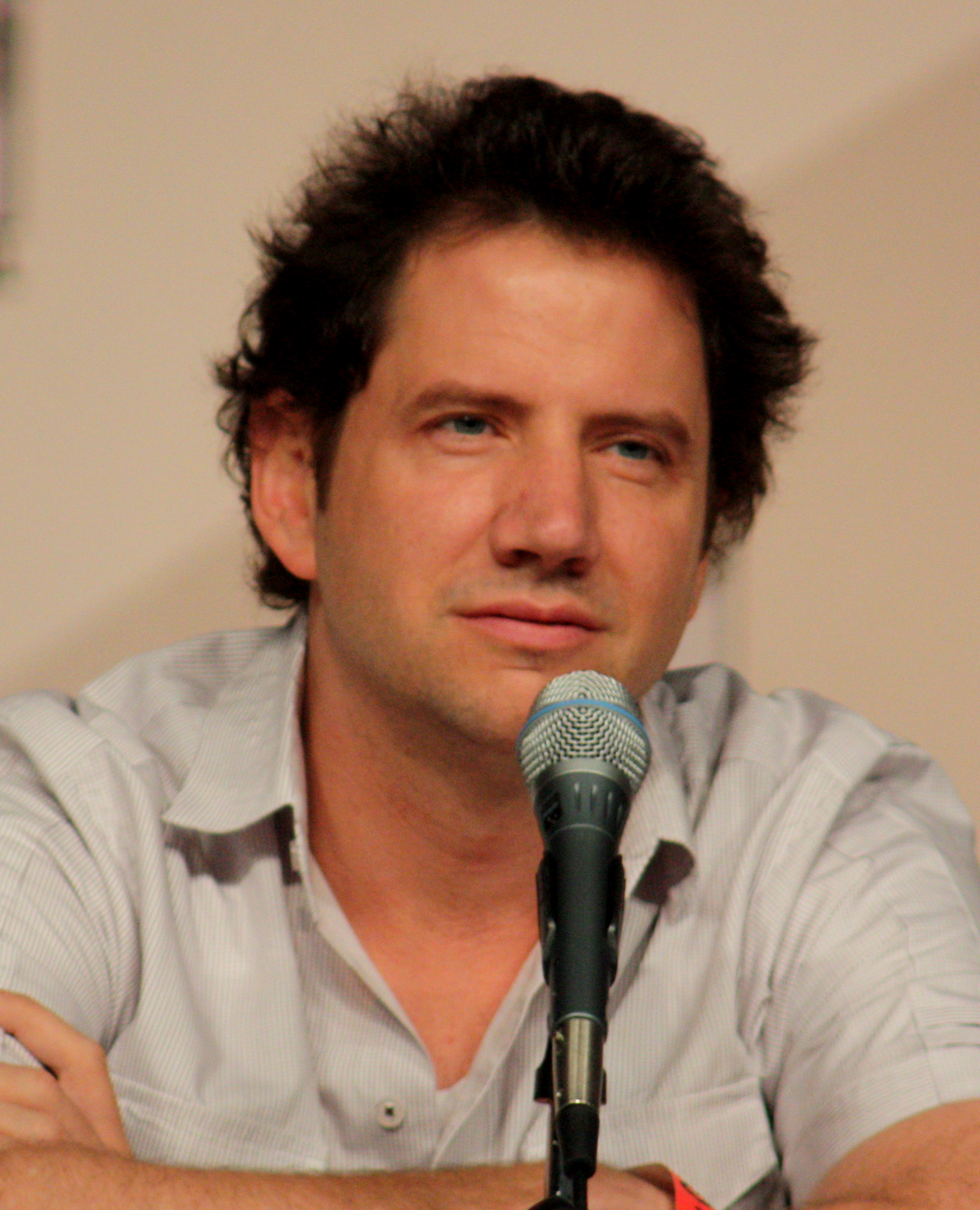
Actor and comedian Jamie Kennedy (pictured) portrayed Randy in Scream

In Kevin Williamson's original script for Scream (1996), Randy Meeks was going to have a more prominent role in the climax of the film. He was scripted to engage in a physical altercation with Stu Macher, one of the killers, ultimately defeating him by crashing a VCR onto his head before Sidney Prescott shoots him in the head. Additionally, the original script included a moment where Randy asks Sidney out on a date with her replying "Only if it's a nice Meg Ryan movie", However, these elements were ultimately omitted from the final film, as the focus shifted towards Sidney facing her attackers alone and, while Randy still has interest in Sidney in the final film, she does not reciprocate his feelings. Williamson stated that he never intended for Randy and Sidney to become a couple, envisioning their relationship as one of friendship with Randy harbouring a crush on Sidney.

When casting Randy, Dimension Films intended a bigger name to play the character, with actors like Jason Lee, Seth Green, and Breckin Meyer being considered, meaning that Jamie Kennedy was initially rejected from the part. Director Wes Craven fought for Kennedy to play the character, as he recognized Kennedy's potential and insisted on his casting, drawing a parallel to Johnny Depp's casting as Glen Lantz in A Nightmare on Elm Street (1984). This resulted in Kennedy securing the part. Costume designer Cynthia Bergstrom said that Randy was dressed in a "Perhaps, but they were also bright, bold..." "look at me, I want to be seen" characters".

=== Characterization ===
Randy Meeks epitomizes the archetype of the cinephile nerd. When actor Jamie Kennedy received the character breakdown, it said that Randy is "a lanky, gangly, opinionated fifth wheel who has a love and passion for movies and begins to dismantle these murders and start piecing things together". Kennedy quickly identified with the character. Despite his intelligence, Randy is characterized as somewhat goofy, done to add levity to the film's narrative. In the first Scream film, as a video store employee, Randy establishes the rules for surviving a horror movie, setting a precedent for the franchise. As the series progresses, Randy's expertise gains greater appreciation from the other characters, highlighting his evolution from a mere film geek to a crucial voice in the meta-dialogue of the movies.

Randy's hyper-awareness and self-aware nature make him a beloved outcast figure, with his unrequited crush on Sidney Prescott. His exaggerated anticipation of impending danger serves as a narrative tool, with Craven utilizing Randy as a surrogate character for the audience. Randy's role as the glue holding the first Scream film together is crucial, as he provides essential meta-commentary while navigating the horror narrative.

=== Death ===
When writing Scream 2 (1997), a significant character's demise was deemed necessary by Williamson to escalate the stakes. He chose to kill off Randy, despite being a beloved character among fans, to shock the audience and intensify their reaction towards the killer, saying "Everything is off the table. I knew we weren't going to kill Sidney; I knew we weren't going to kill Gale or Dewey. Those three characters, for Scream 2, were safe, and so I had to look to the secondary characters". However, Williamson later expressed regret over this decision, wishing he could have given Randy a larger role as a "legacy character". Despite plans to potentially bring Randy back in Scream 3 (2000), they could only incorporate him through posthumous cameo appearances, as his death scene in the first sequel was too conclusive to feasibly reverse.

== Popular culture ==
Randy is often credited with kickstarting a new generation of the "nerd" archetype in horror cinema, where beforehand throughout horror in the 1980s and early 1990s the characters would be portrayed as bullied outcasts with little competence, they began to be portrayed more as intelligent, witty, and central to the plot following the release of Scream. Through his character, audiences were introduced to the meta-narrative of postmodern self-awareness within horror cinema. His status as the archetypal nerd was not depicted as a stereotype but as a form of narrative disruption. His influenced subsequent portrayals of similar characters in fictional friend groups across various media.

Randy's character was directly spoofed in the 2000 film Scary Movie, a parody of '90s slasher films, particularly Scream, Scream 2, and I Know What You Did Last Summer. The character Shorty Meeks, played by Marlon Wayans, was based on Randy.

== Reception ==
Randy is generally considered a fan favorite and one of the most popular characters in the Scream franchise. In 2022, Collider ranked Randy as one of the 10 funniest supporting characters in the horror genre, with Amanda Guarragi writing "[Randy] is such a fun character because he plants particular seeds in the viewer's mind as to who the killer is and who is trustworthy". He also ranked among Collider's best cinephile characters, as in a 2023 ranking he placed 2nd, with Barry Estelhomme writing "Randy knows how to break down classic slasher films and his horror rules educate the audience and his peers on popular tropes to avoid to survive horror movies" and that his "stamp on pop culture is remarkable". Benjamin Hathaway of MovieWeb wrote that Randy is "One of Scream's most memorable characters" and the "king of self-awareness" in a 2023 ranking of movie characters who reference other films. It's not just his savvy that makes Randy memorable, as he's also a genuinely sweet person who wants the best for his peers". Jack Pooley of WhatCulture described Randy as "being hilarious" and that his role in the first two Scream films was "an endearing, sex-starved nerd who in many ways feels like the audience surrogate". In 2023, MovieWeb ranked Randy as the 4th best scream character – only behind Dewey Riley, Gale Weathers, and Sidney Prescott, with Olly Dyche writing "Randy is a plainly lovable character, had many brilliant character moments, and showed great intellect to help the rest of the film's characters" and also praised Jamie Kennedy's performance, writing that "Kennedy made the role his own, and helped Randy become one of the most beloved and relatable characters in horror history." Kartik Nair also praised Kennedy's performance, writing that it had a "charming insouciance". In 1998, Kennedy won the award for Favorite Supporting Actor under the Horror category at the 4th Annual Blockbuster Entertainment Awards.

Randy's death in Scream 2 received mixed reactions, with some believing the decision was necessary to increase stakes and others finding it disappointing for Randy's character arc. Mack Veltman of Horror Obsessive wrote that Randy "deserved a longer run in the franchise, and even though he made a posthumous cameo in Scream 3, his absence was felt" and that the franchise "never felt the same". Jack Pooley of WhatCulture named the character's death in Scream 2 as undeservedly brutal, writing that "everything about [the] scene was executed for maximum shock value and disgust". Padraig Cotter of Screen Rant argued that Randy's death was the best move for the franchise, saying "While it was no doubt a painful choice, slasher movies need to make viewers feel on edge and feel that nobody is safe".
