= Scream 2 =

1997 American slasher film

- Theatrical release poster
- Directed by: Wes Craven
- Written by: Kevin Williamson
- Based on: Characters by Kevin Williamson
- Produced by: Wes Craven; Cathy Konrad; Marianne Maddalena
- Starring: David Arquette; Neve Campbell; Courteney Cox; Sarah Michelle Gellar; Jamie Kennedy; Jerry O'Connell; Jada Pinkett; Liev Schreiber
- Cinematography: Peter Deming
- Edited by: Patrick Lussier
- Music by: Marco Beltrami
- Production companies: Konrad Pictures; Craven-Maddalena Films
- Distributed by: Dimension Films
- Release dates: December 10, 1997 (Hollywood); December 12, 1997 (United States)
- Running time: 120 minutes
- Country: United States
- Language: English
- Budget: $24 million
- Box office: $172 million

Scream 2 is a 1997 American slasher film directed by Wes Craven and written by Kevin Williamson. It stars David Arquette, Neve Campbell, Courteney Cox, Sarah Michelle Gellar, Jamie Kennedy, Laurie Metcalf, Jerry O'Connell, Jada Pinkett and Liev Schreiber. A sequel to Scream (1996), it is the second installment in the Scream film series. Scream 2 follows the character of Sidney Prescott (Campbell), and the other survivors of the Woodsboro massacre, at the fictional Windsor College in Ohio where they are targeted by a copycat killer using the identity of Ghostface. Like its predecessor, Scream 2 combines the violence of the slasher genre with elements of comedy, satire and "whodunit" mystery while satirizing the cliché of film sequels.

Williamson provided a five-page outline for a sequel to Scream when auctioning his original script, hoping to entice bidders with the potential of buying a franchise. Following a successful test screening of Scream and the film's financial and critical success, Dimension moved forward with the sequel while Scream was still in theaters, with the principal cast all returning to star, Craven to direct and Marco Beltrami to provide music. The film faced controversy following its significant issues with plot information leaking onto the Internet, revealing the identities of the killers. Combined with the film's rushed schedule, the script was rewritten often; pages were sometimes completed on the day of filming.

Scream 2 was released on December 12, 1997, by Dimension Films. The film earned $172 million at the box office, and received positive reviews from critics. Beltrami received positive critical reception for his score for evolving the musical themes of the characters created in Scream, although some critics claimed that the most memorable pieces from the film were created by composers Danny Elfman and Hans Zimmer. Elfman's contribution had been specially written for the film, but Zimmer's score for Broken Arrow (1996) was controversially used in the film, replacing Beltrami's own work. The film's soundtrack achieved moderate sales success, reaching number 50 on the Billboard 200. A sequel, Scream 3, was released in February 2000.

== Plot ==
Two Windsor College seniors, Maureen Evans and Phil Stevens, attend a sneak preview of Stab, a film based on the events of the Woodsboro massacre. (Note: As depicted in Scream (1996)) Briefly exiting the theater to use the restroom, Phil is killed by an individual donning a Ghostface costume, who proceeds to sit beside Maureen in Phil's place. The killer then stabs her repeatedly, unnoticed by the raucous crowd, leading her to climb up on stage in a cry for help, which the audience mistakes for a publicity stunt until she falls dead.

The news media, including local journalist Debbie Salt, descend on Windsor College where Sidney Prescott is a student alongside her roommate Hallie McDaniel, her new boyfriend Derek Feldman, fellow Woodsboro survivor Randy Meeks and Derek's friend Mickey Altieri. Two other Woodsboro survivors arrive: police deputy Dewey Riley to offer Sidney protection, and reporter Gale Weathers to cover the incident. Gale and her new cameraman, Joel Jones, unsuccessfully try to stage a confrontation between Sidney and Cotton Weary, who is attempting to gain fame from his exoneration for the rape and murder of Sidney's mother, Maureen Prescott.

That evening, Sidney and Hallie attend a party at the sorority house Delta Lambda Zeta. At Omega Beta Zeta, another nearby sorority house, Ghostface murders student Cici Cooper. After the partygoers leave to observe Cici's crime scene, Ghostface enters Delta Lambda Zeta and attacks Sidney. Ghostface injures Derek but flees when the police arrive. Later, after realizing that Cici is a diminutive for Casey, Gale theorizes that the new Ghostface is targeting students with similar names to the Woodsboro murder victims. Randy theorizes that the killer is likely someone Sidney already knows and is patterning the homicides after a movie sequel. Soon after, Ghostface calls Gale, Dewey, and Randy while they are together in daylight on the college campus. Despite their attempts to find him, Ghostface ultimately ambushes Randy and pulls him into Joel's media van, where he is murdered. Shortly after, Joel, fearing he will be targeted next, skips town.

As night falls over the campus, Dewey and Gale go to a building to review tapes of footage shot by Joel, hoping to spot the killer in the vicinity of the previous crime scenes, but Ghostface attacks them, stabbing Dewey. Two officers driving Sidney and Hallie to a safe house are murdered when Ghostface intercepts the vehicle. In the ensuing struggle, Ghostface is knocked unconscious, but recovers and kills Hallie. Drawn to music playing in the campus theater (Note: From the college's production of The Oresteia) while seeking safety, Sidney finds Derek in the auditorium tied to a cross from an earlier fraternity hazing ritual. Ghostface arrives, revealing himself as Mickey, and shoots Derek, killing him.

Mickey divulges his intent to kill Sidney and allow his arrest, in an effort to blame movie violence for the murders and become famous from the oncoming trial. Debbie arrives, holding Gale at gunpoint, and is revealed to be Mickey's accomplice, whom Sidney recognizes as Nancy Loomis, the mother of Woodsboro killer Billy Loomis. Nancy betrays Mickey and shoots him, affirming that she only used Mickey to frame him for their killing spree. Mickey fires his gun before collapsing, wounding Gale, who falls offstage. Nancy discloses she is seeking revenge against Sidney for killing Billy and that she murdered Randy in Joel's news van for slandering her son's name during their phone call. However, Sidney points out the hypocrisy of Nancy's motives, considering that her abandonment fueled Billy's psychotic tendencies. The pair fight until Cotton appears and holds them at gunpoint. Nancy attempts to manipulate Cotton into murdering Sidney, reminding him that her testimony got him arrested. Much to Nancy's shock, he instead chooses to shoot her in exchange for an interview with Sidney and Diane Sawyer. As Sidney, Cotton, and Gale glance over Nancy's body, Mickey suddenly resurfaces but is shot to death by Gale and Sidney. Sidney then shoots Nancy in the head to ensure her death.

When the police arrive, Dewey is revealed to be alive and Gale climbs into the ambulance with him rather than taking the opportunity to report with the returning Joel. Sidney then instructs the press to direct questions to Cotton to remove attention from herself and reward Cotton for helping her.

== Cast ==
- David Arquette as Dewey Riley
- Neve Campbell as Sidney Prescott
- Courteney Cox as Gale Weathers
- Sarah Michelle Gellar as Cici Cooper
- Jamie Kennedy as Randy Meeks
- Laurie Metcalf as Debbie Salt
- Elise Neal as Hallie McDaniel
- Jerry O'Connell as Derek Feldman
- Timothy Olyphant as Mickey Altieri
- Jada Pinkett as Maureen Evans
- Liev Schreiber as Cotton Weary
- Lewis Arquette as Louis Hartley
- Philip Pavel as Officer Andrews
- Christopher Doyle as Officer Richards
- Duane Martin as Joel
- Rebecca Gayheart as Lois
- Portia de Rossi as Murphy
- Omar Epps as Phil Stevens
- Heather Graham as herself as Casey Becker (character in the in-universe film Stab)
- Roger L. Jackson as the voice of Ghostface
- Josh Jackson as film class guy #1
- Marisol Nichols as Dawnie
- Nancy O'Dell as Tori's interviewer
- Tori Spelling as herself and as Sidney Prescott (character in the in-universe film Stab)
- Luke Wilson as himself as Billy Loomis (character in the in-universe film Stab)
- David Warner as Gus Gold

== Production ==
=== Writing and early stages ===
While writing the script for Scream, screenwriter Kevin Williamson also developed two five-page treatments for potential sequels, hoping to entice prospective buyers with the fact that they were not just buying a film but a franchise, and after a successful test screening for the original, at which Miramax executives were present, Craven was also given a contract to direct the two future films. Williamson's idea for a sequel was that Sidney Prescott would now be attending college and a copycat Ghostface killer would start a new series of murders.

Dimension Films considered pursuing development of a sequel in January 1997 after Scream grossed more than $50 million in the first month of its release, with production being greenlit in March 1997 and the provision of an increased budget of $24 million over Scream's $15 million. Williamson already had 42 pages of the plot developed by this point, which involved four different killers: Derek; Hallie; Cotton Weary; and Nancy Loomis, who is the mother of one of the previous film's killers.

Craven was hesitant about returning to direct the film, as he was worried about missing other opportunities, not wanting to be "trapped" by a Scream franchise, so Williamson and the other filmmakers talked with Robert Rodriguez about directing Scream 2, an offer he was willing to take. However, Craven ultimately felt unable to leave Scream 2 to someone else and agreed to direct it, so Rodriguez left to direct The Faculty.

=== Filming ===
Principal photography for Scream 2 took place over a nine-week period beginning in mid-June 1997 and on a budget of $24 million. Atlanta, Georgia, and Los Angeles were used to represent the state of Ohio, where the fictional Windsor College is situated in Scream 2, with filming taking place largely in Los Angeles and over four weeks in Atlanta. The opening scene featuring the premiere of the fictional Stab film was filmed over three days in the Vista Theater on Sunset Drive, Hollywood, with the exterior represented by the Rialto Theater in South Pasadena, California.

The sorority homes used by the character Cici Cooper and a nearby party were also filmed in Pasadena, east of Los Angeles. The fictional Stab film was filmed in Malibu, California. Agnes Scott College, just outside Atlanta, and UCLA in Los Angeles were used to represent the fictional Windsor College which appears in the film.

=== Plot leak and re-writes ===
After Williamson transferred his script to the production, it was leaked onto the Internet in full by one of the film's extras, revealing the identities of the killers and a large amount of the involved plot. This resulted in the production continuing to film with only a partial script while Williamson conducted extensive rewrites, changing much of the film's finale, the identities of the film's killers and drastically altering the roles of other characters such as Randy Meeks and Joel.

To avoid another such incident and prevent sensitive plot details being revealed through other means, the actors were not given the last pages of the script until weeks before shooting and the pages that revealed the killer's identity were only provided on the day the scene was shot and only to the actors involved. The short production schedule on Scream 2 and his work on other projects meant that Williamson's final script used for the film was detailed in some areas but lacking in others, with Craven forced to write and develop certain scenes as they were being filmed. Following the script's leak, security around the production was significantly increased, with a focus on closed film sets and strict restrictions on what personnel could be present during filming and have access to the script, with all present required to sign non-disclosure agreements. The script itself was reprinted on specialty paper to prevent photocopying and was often destroyed after use.

The incident was the first in which a film was significantly affected by an Internet leak. In 2017, Williamson claimed the leaked script was a "dummy draft" that was crafted specifically to avoid leaked details and that there had been three dummy endings written.

"They were worried the killer's identity would be leaked, so we wrote several endings. Three in all, if memory serves, and when actors and potential crew members asked to read the script, we would send the script with the dummy ending ... There was even a fake ending where Dewey was the killer. They existed as a decoy and nothing more. Extreme measures, but we really wanted to keep the killer's identity a secret!"

In an interview, Craven commented on the rushed six-month production schedule, with the film being expected ready for release on December 12, less than a year after the release of Scream, and Williamson forced to rewrite his script. Pages for scenes would often only be ready on the day of filming and others lacked significant detail, forcing Craven to develop them as the scenes took place. Various titles were considered for the sequel at different points in the film's production, including Scream Again, Scream Louder and Scream: The Sequel before the studio decided to simply use Scream 2.

=== Casting ===
Neve Campbell had been contracted to reprise her role as heroine Sidney Prescott in a potential sequel before filming had even begun on Scream, her character being the only one from the original film guaranteed to survive and lead a new film. Once production of a sequel was seen as inevitable, following the success of Scream, Dimension Films added sequel options for the actors whose characters had survived the previous film: Courteney Cox as ambitious news reporter Gale Weathers, David Arquette as retired deputy sheriff Dewey Riley, Jamie Kennedy as film-geek Randy Meeks and Liev Schreiber as Cotton Weary, the man exonerated for the murder of Sidney's mother. Roger L. Jackson also returned to voice the character of Ghostface.

Having finalized the returning principal cast from Scream, the production approached their casting for Scream 2 in a similar manner, seeking established and popular actors, largely sourcing from TV shows of the time. In interviews, the production staff of the film remarked that they found approaching and securing the talent they wanted significantly easier than it had been for Scream, considering the financial and critical success of the film but also believing the prior involvement of Drew Barrymore had lent the horror genre an element of credibility which made serious actors eager to become involved.

New cast included Sarah Michelle Gellar as sorority sister and film fan Cici Cooper, Elise Neal as Sidney's friend and roommate Hallie, Jerry O'Connell as Sidney's boyfriend Derek, Timothy Olyphant as Mickey and Laurie Metcalf as local reporter Debbie Salt. Early in development, Alicia Silverstone and Liv Tyler were approached to appear in the film's opening sequence, while Eric Mabius, Natasha Gregson Wagner and Paula Marshall all auditioned for unspecified roles. According to Jamie Kennedy, Tobey Maguire was offered the role of Mickey, but he turned it down. Many of the actors involved in the production, including Campbell, Cox, Gellar, and O'Connell were starring in their own television series at the time, allowing the production limited availability to schedule their involvement. Gellar in particular was in-between filming of Buffy the Vampire Slayer and had only recently finished work on another Williamson-penned film, I Know What You Did Last Summer (1997). Despite the hectic scheduling, Gellar admitted in an interview that she agreed to perform in Scream 2 without having read the script because of the success of Scream. Metcalf had only just finished her nine-year run on the popular sitcom Roseanne when she began work on Scream 2 and Craven was praising of her ability to portray the deranged Nancy Loomis. To obtain the role of Derek, O'Connell and other candidates had to audition by performing a scene from the film in which the character sings "I Think I Love You". Olyphant's involvement as Mickey was his first leading role in a feature film. Despite scheduling difficulties, Craven took their desire to participate in the film despite their workload as a compliment to the film's quality.

The cast was rounded out by Lewis Arquette, father of David Arquette, as a local Sheriff in charge of investigating the new murders, Duane Martin as Gale's cameraman Joel, Jada Pinkett and Omar Epps as Maureen Evans and Phil Stevens, patrons of the fictional "Stab" film who become the film's opening victims, and Portia de Rossi and Rebecca Gayheart as sorority sisters Murphy and Lois. Gayheart had auditioned for the role of Tatum Riley in Scream and auditioned multiple times for Scream 2 for the roles of Cici Cooper, Hallie and Maureen Evans before obtaining her eventual role. Minor roles were filled by Chris Doyle and Philip Pavel as Officer Richards and Officer Andrews, assigned to protect Sidney, veteran actor David Warner as Sidney's drama teacher, Joshua Jackson as an unnamed film student, and Nancy O'Dell as an unnamed reporter who would reprise the role in future installments of the series. Tori Spelling, Luke Wilson and Heather Graham played themselves as characters in the "Stab" films; credited as Stab Sidney, Stab Billy and Stab Casey respectively. Spelling was cast based on a sarcastic remark by Campbell's character in Scream that she would be played by Spelling in a movie based on her life. Craven remarked that she was a "good sport" about the joke and happy to take part.

=== Post-production ===
Craven had difficulties passing Scream through the film-rating body MPAA to receive an R-rating to help the film remain commercially viable, sending eight different cuts and requiring the direct intervention of Dimension Films founder Bob Weinstein to eventually obtain the necessary rating to release the film without significant cuts.

Eager to avoid the same experience on Scream 2, Craven attempted to manipulate the MPAA by sending them a version of the film that had been edited to focus on and enhance the gore and violence present beyond what they actually wanted in the film, including reusing a clip of Omar Epps' character Phil Stevens being stabbed in the ear three times, instead of only once as seen in the final film, and an extended scene of Randy Meeks' death that showed his throat being slashed. Craven's reasoning was that the parts of the film they wished to keep would be more acceptable when viewed with the enhanced violence and so the MPAA would force them to remove the footage they already did not want to keep while passing the content they did want. However, the MPAA granted Scream 2 an R-rating for the more violent cut, as they believed the underlying message of the film was significant enough to warrant the violence.

=== Music ===
Marco Beltrami returned to helm the score for Scream 2, though there would be a late inclusion by Danny Elfman in the form of the choral track "Cassandra Aria" which plays during a scene where Campbell's character performs in a play and again in the film's finale as "Cassandra Aria Reprise". Excerpts from the score of the 1996 film Broken Arrow by Hans Zimmer appeared in the film, in particular guitar work by Duane Eddy, for the character Dewey, replacing the tracks that had been developed for the character from the original Scream score. Beltrami would explain in an interview that the Zimmer piece was used as a placeholder for Beltrami's incomplete score during a test screening. The test audience reaction to it influenced the studio to keep the Zimmer piece, reducing "Dewey's Theme", which Beltrami had composed to fill its place, to minor use during more serious scenes involving the character. In 1998, Varèse Sarabande released a 30-minute album with music from Scream and Scream 2, and in 2016, Scream 2: The Deluxe Edition was released including the Elfman material and the complete Beltrami score.

== Release ==
Scream 2 held its premiere on December 10, 1997, at Grauman's Chinese Theater in Hollywood, followed by a general release on December 12, 1997, less than a year after the release of Scream. After the unexpected success of Scream, by late 1997, Scream 2 was considered such a potential box office success that the James Bond film Tomorrow Never Dies and James Cameron's future hit Titanic were moved from their release date of December 12 to 19, so as to not face the film as competition.

=== Home media ===
Scream 2 was released in US territories on VHS on December 1, 1998, by Disney's Buena Vista Home Entertainment (under the Dimension Home Video banner). It was distributed in Canada by Alliance Atlantis, who had a pre-existing Canadian distribution agreement with Dimension/Miramax. Scream 2 was released on DVD for the first time in the US on July 22, 1998 with a Collector's Edition following on September 26, 2000, in "The Ultimate Scream Collection" and a separate release on August 7, 2001. The Collector's Edition featured additional material including outtakes, deleted scenes, the film's theatrical trailer, music videos of songs featured in the film and director's commentary. Both releases were undertaken by Buena Vista Home Entertainment. Following the release of then series finale Scream 3, the three films were collected in "The Ultimate Scream Collection" by Dimension Films on September 26, 2000, in a box set containing Behind the Scream, a short documentary about the production of the three films and additional material including screen tests of actors involved in the films, outtakes and deleted scenes.

Scream 2 remained unreleased in foreign territories including Europe and Japan until February 26, 2001, when it was released simultaneously with Scream and Scream 3 by Buena Vista Home Entertainment. Each film contained the additional content found in the Collector's Edition version of the US release, including deleted scenes, outtakes, theatrical trailers, music videos and commentary from each respective film's crew. Additionally, the three films were collected together in a single pack as the "Scream Trilogy".

Scream 2 was released individually and in a collection with Scream and Scream 3 on Blu-ray on March 29, 2011, two weeks prior to the theatrical release of Scream 4, by Lionsgate Home Entertainment. In addition to the films, each release contained audio commentary, theatrical trailers and behind-the-scenes footage.

Paramount later included Scream 2 in a collection titled Paramount Scares, which included other horror films they owned, in addition to making Scream 2 available on their streaming service Paramount+. The film was released on 4K Ultra HD Blu-ray on October 4, 2022, by Paramount Home Entertainment. The 2022 home video reissue grossed $881,768 in sales.

== Reception ==
=== Box office ===
Scream 2 opened in 2,663 theaters and took $32.9 million on its opening weekend in box-office receipts, a $27 million increase over Scream. It went on to gross $101 million in the United States and $71 million in other territories with a worldwide lifetime gross of $172 million. Its debut set the December opening weekend record until December 2000, being replaced by What Women Want (2000). It also achieved the highest December weekend gross for two weeks until it was overtaken by Titanic. Scream 2 enjoyed financial success on par with Scream despite its rapid production time and issues with script rewrites, nearly matching the first film's total gross of $173 million. Scream 2 is currently the third highest-grossing film in the slasher genre, again behind Scream. Scream 2 was the 21st highest-grossing film of 1997 despite competition from blockbuster films such as Titanic and Men in Black.

=== Critical reception ===
On the review aggregator website Rotten Tomatoes, the film holds an approval rating of 83% based on 133 reviews, with an average rating of 6.9/10. The website's critical consensus reads: "As with the first film, Scream 2 is a gleeful takedown of scary movie conventions that manages to poke fun at terrible horror sequels without falling victim to the same fate." On Metacritic, the film received a weighted average score of 62 out of 100 based on 22 critics, indicating "generally favorable reviews". On CinemaScore, audiences gave the film an average grade of "B+" on an A+ to F scale.

Both Gene Siskel and The New York Times' Janet Maslin gave the sequel positive reviews despite their negative response to Scream; Maslin remarked: "Scream 2 almost works as straight satire. It's so sharp—pardon the expression—that no pretty young things absolutely had to die." Roger Ebert stated the film was "about as good as the original" but lamented that "[Scream 2] is gorier than the original, and that distracts from the witty screenplay." Time Out London was mixed in its response, calling the film superior to most other horror films, but poor in comparison to Scream, while Variety, scathing of Scream before its release, positively received the sequel, saying "[characters] ponder whether any sequel ever topped the original. Scream 2 is certainly worthy of being part of that debate." Empire's Kim Newman echoed this sentiment saying "Some great comic—and terrifying—moments, but suffers for not being as original as the original" remarking that though the film had the same elements that made Scream a success, they were no longer surprising for having been in Scream.

There was, however, criticism over the death of the character Randy Meeks played by Kennedy. John Muir, author of Wes Craven: The Art of Horror called the character's death the "most devastating moment of the sequel" and a "bad call", but praised the development of the other surviving characters from Scream, calling Cox, Arquette and Campbell's characters "beloved". In contrast, Muir criticized all of the new characters in Scream 2, believing they never attained the same depth of the Scream cast because of Scream 2's focus on increasing the body count and violence over the original, saying that the film's killer could literally be anyone, as the audience is never provided with enough information about the new characters to form an opinion about them. Ebert also commented upon this, saying "there is no way to guess who's doing the killing, and everyone who seems suspicious is (almost) sure to be innocent".

=== Accolades ===
Scream 2 won few awards compared to its predecessor, with Campbell again receiving the most nominations and wins, having won two awards for Scream. She received a Saturn Award for Best Actress nomination and went on to win a MTV Movie Award for Best Female Performance. Despite having only a brief cameo appearance as "Sidney Prescott" in the film within a film Stab shown in Scream 2, Tori Spelling became one of the nominees for a 1997 Golden Raspberry Award for Worst New Star, which was tied with her role in The House of Yes. The film also received Saturn Award nominations for Best Supporting Actress for Courteney Cox and Best Horror Film for Scream 2 itself.

Year	Award	Category	Work	Result
1998	Saturn Awards	Best Actress	Neve Campbell	Nominated
1998	Saturn Awards	Best Horror Film	Scream 2	Nominated
1998	Saturn Awards	Best Supporting Actress	Courteney Cox	Nominated
1998	MTV Movie Awards	Best Female Performance	Neve Campbell	Won

== See also ==
- List of films featuring fictional films
