= Scream (1996 film) =

American slasher film

- Theatrical release poster
- Directed by: Wes Craven
- Written by: Kevin Williamson
- Produced by: Cathy Konrad; Cary Woods
- Starring: David Arquette; Neve Campbell; Courteney Cox; Matthew Lillard; Rose McGowan; Skeet Ulrich; Drew Barrymore
- Cinematography: Mark Irwin
- Edited by: Patrick Lussier
- Music by: Marco Beltrami
- Production company: Woods Entertainment
- Distributed by: Dimension Films
- Release dates: December 18, 1996 (Los Angeles); December 20, 1996 (United States)
- Running time: 111 minutes
- Country: United States
- Language: English
- Budget: $14–15 million
- Box office: $173 million

Scream is a 1996 American slasher film directed by Wes Craven and written by Kevin Williamson. It stars David Arquette, Neve Campbell, Courteney Cox, Matthew Lillard, Rose McGowan, Skeet Ulrich, and Drew Barrymore. Set in the fictional town of Woodsboro, California, the plot follows high school student Sidney Prescott (Campbell) and her friends as they become the targets of a costumed serial killer on the anniversary of her mother's murder.

Williamson, who was struggling to get his projects off the ground, was inspired by reports of the Gainesville Ripper murders to write a screenplay that satirized the clichés of the slasher genre popularized by films such as Halloween (1978), Friday the 13th (1980), and Craven's own A Nightmare on Elm Street (1984). Developed under the title Scary Movie, the script became the subject of an intense bidding war among multiple studios before Miramax Films purchased the rights for its Dimension Films label. Although Craven initially declined the project several times, he agreed to direct after reading the script, hoping to re-establish himself following a series of career setbacks. The involvement of the well-known Barrymore and Cox helped secure additional studio support. Principal photography took place in California from April to June 1996 on a budget of $15 million. Craven also trimmed the film's violence following a dispute with the Motion Picture Association of America over securing an R rating.

Released on December 20, Scream was not expected to perform well because of concerns about releasing a slasher film during the Christmas season. However, strong word of mouth helped it gross approximately $173 million worldwide, making it an unexpected success and one of the year's highest-grossing films. Contemporary reviews were positive, with praise directed toward the film's self-aware humor and effectiveness as a slasher film, although some felt its meta approach was overly irreverent.

In the years since its release, Scream has been regarded as a cultural touchstone and one of the most influential horror films of the 1990s. It has been credited with revitalizing the slasher genre and popularizing a self-aware, metatextual approach to horror that influenced numerous later works. Its opening sequence, in which Barrymore's character is unexpectedly killed, became particularly noted for its tension and subversion of audience expectations. The film's success launched a franchise, which includes the sequels Scream 2 (1997), Scream 3 (2000), Scream 4 (2011), Scream (2022), Scream VI (2023), and Scream 7 (2026), as well as an anthology television series.

== Plot ==
In the small town of Woodsboro, California, high school student Casey Becker is home alone when she receives a phone call from an unknown person. Their conversation about horror films turns sadistic when the caller reveals that her boyfriend, Steve Orth, is tied up on the patio. He forces Casey to answer horror trivia to save Steve's life, but after she incorrectly answers a question about Friday the 13th, Steve is murdered. Casey attempts to escape, but is fatally stabbed by someone wearing a "Ghostface" costume, and her disemboweled corpse is then discovered hanging from a tree by her parents.

The following morning, the media descend on Woodsboro as police investigate the murders. Casey's classmate Sidney Prescott is struggling with the approaching first anniversary of the rape and murder of her mother, Maureen, for which Cotton Weary was convicted. The trauma has also prevented Sidney from consummating her relationship with her boyfriend, Billy Loomis. With her father, Neil, traveling for work, Sidney waits at home alone for her friend Tatum Riley. Sidney receives a taunting phone call referencing Maureen's death before Ghostface attacks her. The killer flees moments before Billy climbs through her bedroom window, but Sidney becomes suspicious after he drops a cellular phone. Billy is arrested by Deputy Sheriff Dewey, Tatum's older brother.

Outside the police station, Sidney confronts investigative journalist Gale Weathers, whose book claims Maureen had several extramarital affairs, including one with Cotton, whom Gale believes was misidentified as the killer by Sidney. Later, while staying at Tatum's house, Sidney receives another call from the killer, mocking her for incorrectly accusing Cotton and Billy. Police trace the calls to Neil's cellular phone, but are unable to locate him.

Following his release, Billy further alienates Sidney by comparing his mother's abandonment to Maureen's death. After classes are suspended in response to the murders, Principal Himbry is killed in his office. To celebrate the school's closure, Stu Macher, Tatum's boyfriend, invites her and Sidney to a party at his secluded home while Dewey and Gale monitor the gathering in case the killer appears. Ghostface isolates Tatum in the garage and crushes her neck in the automatic garage door. As fellow student Randy Meeks explains the "rules" of surviving a horror film, news arrives of Himbry's murder, prompting most of the partygoers to leave to see his hanging body. They nearly run over Dewey and Gale, inadvertently leading them to Neil's hidden car.

Billy arrives to reconcile with Sidney, and the two have sex. Shortly afterward, Ghostface attacks and apparently stabs Billy. Sidney escapes the house while the killer murders Gale's cameraman, Kenny, and stabs Dewey. Attempting to flee in her news van, Gale crashes and is knocked unconscious. Sidney locks herself inside the house, trapping Stu and Randy outside as they accuse each other of being the killer.

Billy suddenly reappears, seemingly wounded, and lets Randy inside before shooting him, revealing both himself and Stu as the killer. Billy explains that they murdered Maureen after discovering her affair with his father, which caused Billy's mother to abandon the family. The pair kidnapped Neil to frame him for the murders, and proceed to stab each other to make themselves appear to be the sole survivors. However, Gale unexpectedly returns and distracts them, allowing Sidney to incapacitate Billy and kill Stu by dropping a television set on his head. Billy attacks Sidney one final time, but Gale shoots him. After Randy warns that horror film killers always return for one last scare, Billy lunges at them, and Sidney shoots him in the head, killing him. As dawn breaks, Neil is rescued, Dewey is taken away by ambulance, and Gale reports on the night's events.

== Cast ==
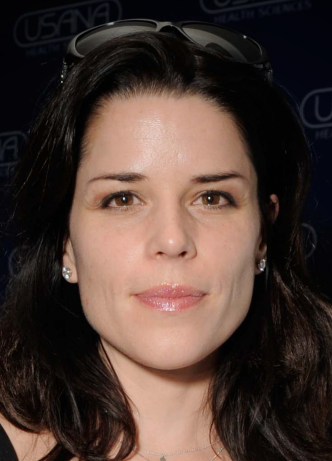
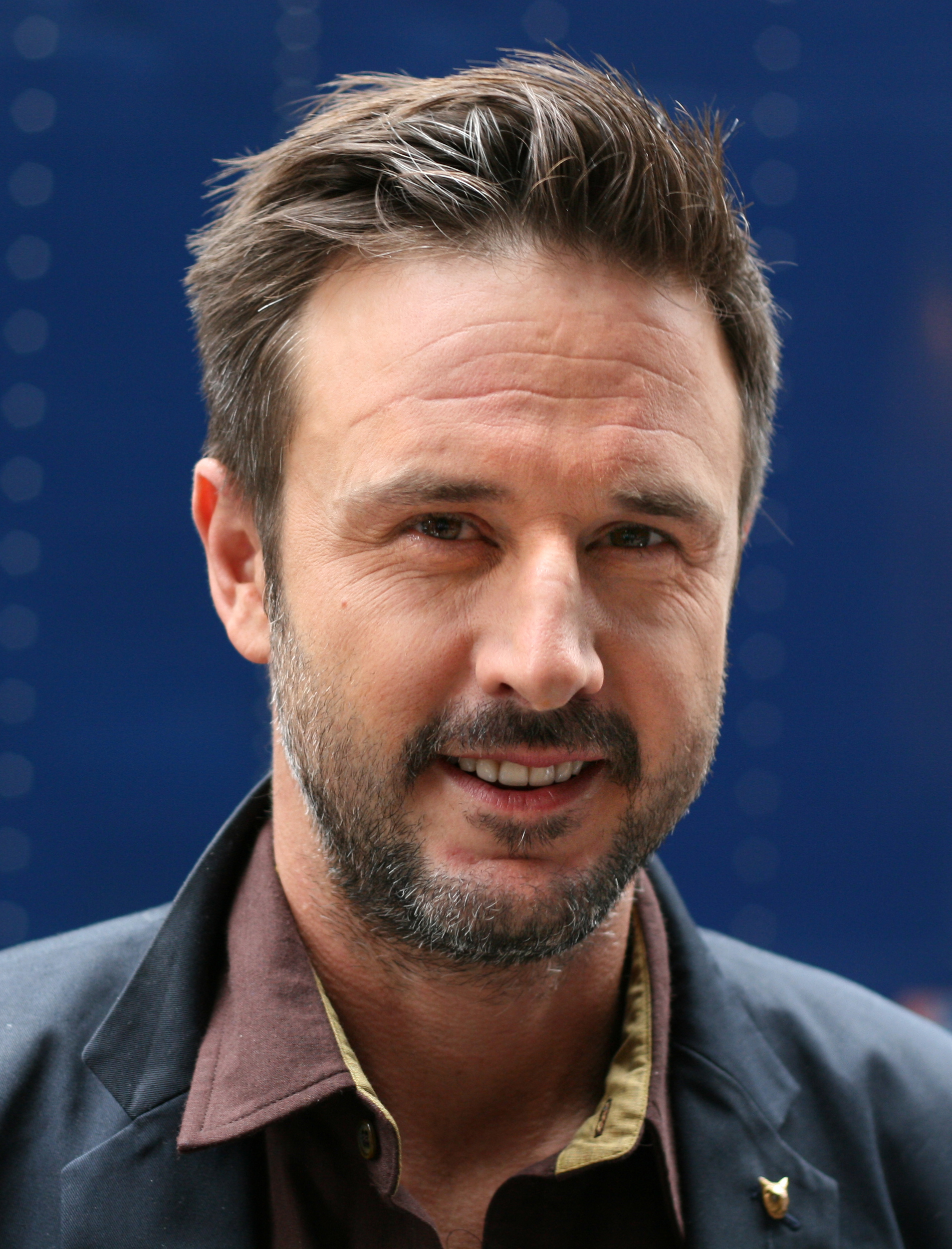
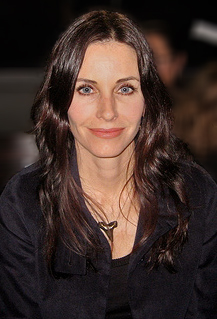
Neve Campbell (pictured in 2010), David Arquette, and Courteney Cox (2009)
- David Arquette as Dewey Riley: The goofy and hapless, but caring deputy sheriff
- Neve Campbell as Sidney Prescott: A high school student traumatized by her mother's murder
- Courteney Cox as Gale Weathers: A ruthless and ambitious investigative journalist
- Matthew Lillard as Stu Macher: The eccentric and clumsy boyfriend of Tatum, and Billy's best friend
- Rose McGowan as Tatum Riley: Sidney's spunky best friend and Dewey's younger sister
- Skeet Ulrich as Billy Loomis: Sidney's boyfriend, who has a passion for horror films
- Jamie Kennedy as Randy Meeks: A horror film enthusiast
- W. Earl Brown as Kenny: Gale's cameraman
- Joseph Whipp as Burke: The town sheriff
- Liev Schreiber as Cotton Weary: The man convicted of killing Sidney's mother
- Drew Barrymore as Casey Becker: A high school student

Scream also features Roger L. Jackson as the voice of Ghostface, and Kevin Patrick Walls as Steve Orth, Casey's boyfriend. Lawrence Hecht and Lynn McRee portray Sidney's parents, Neil and Maureen. C.W. Morgan appears as Billy's father Hank Loomis, Frances Lee McCain portrays Dewey and Tatum's mother Mrs. Riley, and David Booth and Carla Hatley appear as Casey's father and mother. Leonora Scelfo portrays a "bitchy" cheerleader in the school bathroom. Scream features several cameo appearances, including Henry Winkler as principal Arthur Himbry, Linda Blair as obnoxious reporter, casting director Lisa Beach as a reporter, and director Wes Craven as Fred the janitor, an homage to iconic horror character Freddy Krueger.

== Production ==
=== Writing ===
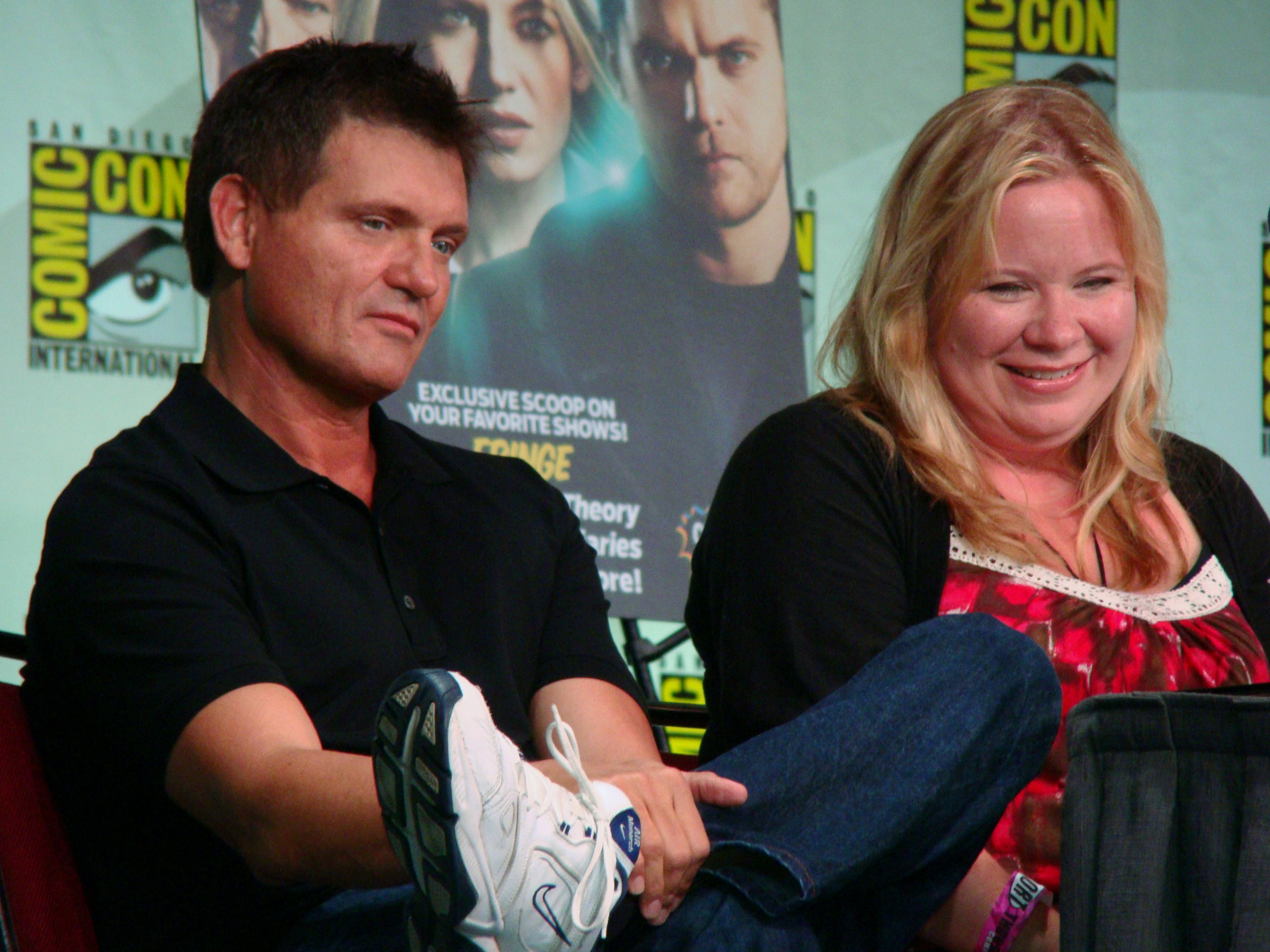
Screenwriter Kevin Williamson and director Wes Craven's assistant Julie Plec (pictured in 2011)

In 1994, Kevin Williamson was a financially struggling novice screenwriter who had recently sold his first script, Killing Mrs. Tingle (1999). (Note: Attributed to multiple references:) While house-sitting, he watched a Turning Point documentary about serial killer Danny Rolling, which left him unsettled. Later that night, Williamson noticed an open window, armed himself with a knife, and called a friend for reassurance. During the conversation, the pair discussed horror villains who had resonated with them, including Freddy Krueger and Jason Voorhees. The following morning, Williamson awoke from a nightmare and used the experience as inspiration for the opening home invasion sequence of Scream. He also drew from a one-act play he had written in college about an unknown caller tormenting a young woman.

Over the next three days, Williamson wrote a slasher screenplay titled Scary Movie while listening to the score to Halloween for inspiration. (Note: Attributed to multiple references:) He also drafted two five-page outlines for potential sequels. Much of the script was developed around the line, "movies don't create psychos, movies make psychos more creative", which Williamson described as his response to contemporary concerns about the influence of cinematic violence on audiences, and he just "thought it was a great line." The script drew heavily from his favorite horror films, including Halloween (1978), Friday the 13th, Prom Night (both 1980), and A Nightmare on Elm Street (1984). At the time, the successful slasher films of previous decades had largely fallen out of favor because of the declining reception to increasingly formulaic sequels in long-running horror franchises.

The characters in Scary Movie were intentionally written as knowledgeable about horror films and their conventions, allowing Williamson to create a killer who both understood and exploited genre clichés. Explaining his approach, he said, "I thought if you could expose the rules and play with them, then the audience doesn't know what they're going to get. Suddenly, they're on edge. I started playing with the tropes, and the 'rules' were part of that." The opening sequence depicting Casey Becker's death was inspired by the killing of Janet Leigh's character in Psycho (1960), eliminating an apparent main character early in the story. Williamson believed this would hook studio executives and leave audiences uncertain about how the narrative would progress. He set the script in his hometown of Bayboro, North Carolina, believing its quiet atmosphere would sharply contrast with the violence of a serial killer.

Williamson pursued Scary Movie because it resembled the type of horror film he had enjoyed as a child but believed were no longer being made. Even so, he doubted studios would produce it and instead hoped it would attract attention and lead to other work. His agent advised him to tone down the gore, removing descriptions such as "the insides are slowly rolling down her leg", because it would make the script more difficult to sell. Williamson refused to remove any dialogue, believing it distinguished the screenplay from similar films.

=== Development ===
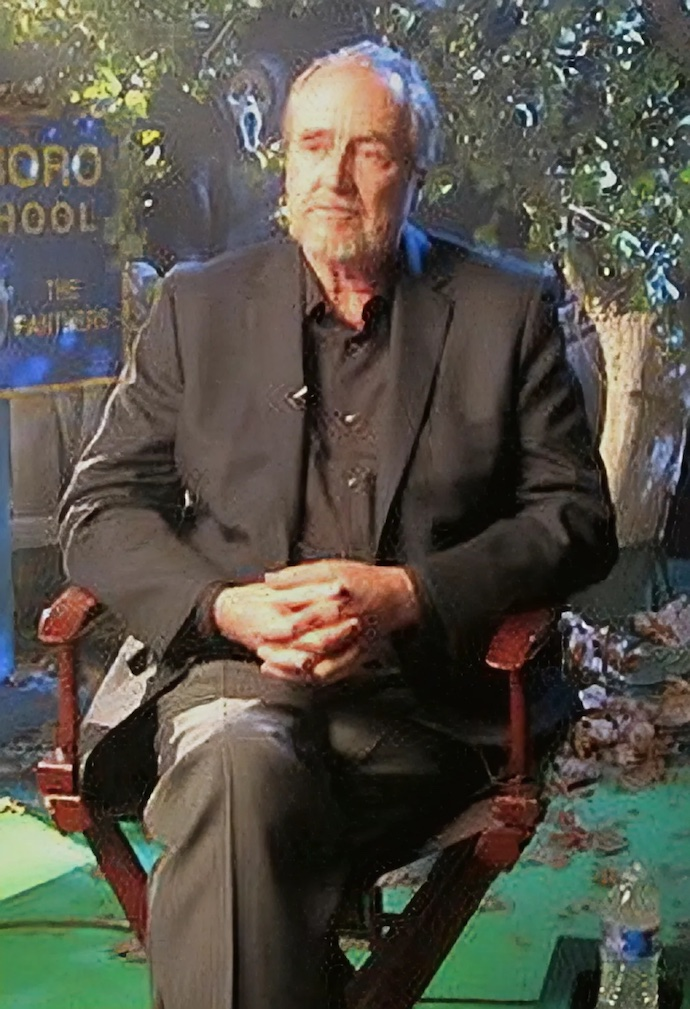
Director Wes Craven (pictured in 2010)

By 1995, several studios and filmmakers were competing to secure the rights to Scary Movie, including Morgan Creek Entertainment, Paramount Pictures, Universal Pictures, and filmmaker Oliver Stone. (Note: Attributed to multiple references:) The script came to the attention of producer Cathy Konrad of Woods Entertainment, which had a development deal with production studio Miramax Films. Konrad brought the screenplay to Richard Potter, director of development for Miramax's genre-focused subsidiary Dimension Films. Expecting a "stupid spoof", Potter instead became engrossed by the opening scene and recommended that Dimension chairman Bob Weinstein pursue the rights. Bob agreed, viewing the project as an opportunity for Dimension to produce films rather than merely distribute them. Although competing offers were reportedly higher, Williamson's lawyer advised him to accept Bob's offer—between $400,000 and $500,000—because Dimension intended to begin production immediately. (Note: Attributed to multiple references:)

Following the sale, Williamson revised the script based on studio feedback. Some of the gorier material, including exposed organs and severed limbs, was removed. At the same time, the murder of Principal Himbry was added after Bob felt there was too long a stretch without any deaths following the opening scene. The addition also solved Williamson's difficulty in explaining why most of the partygoers leave Stu's house during the finale, as they depart to view Himbry's corpse. Late in production, the title was changed from Scary Movie to Scream because Bob feared the original title would lead audiences to mistake the film for a comedy rather than a horror film. (Note: Attributed to multiple references:)

The search for a director proved lengthy. Danny Boyle, Tom McLoughlin, Sam Raimi, George A. Romero, Bryan Singer, Quentin Tarantino, Robert Rodriguez, and Anthony Waller were all considered, but no agreements were reached because many interpreted the screenplay as a broad comedy rather than a horror satire. (Note: Attributed to multiple references:) Although the studio initially dismissed Wes Craven because he lacked experience directing satire, he was repeatedly encouraged to read the script by his assistant Julie Plec and producer Marianne Maddalena.

Craven initially resisted the project because he wanted to move toward less graphic and more mainstream material, including a planned adaptation of the 1959 horror novel The Haunting of Hill House, partly because of the negative public perception of him because of his earlier films. (Note: Attributed to multiple references:) His interest in Scream was renewed after the Hill House adaptation collapsed and his horror comedy Vampire in Brooklyn (1995) disappointed both critically and commercially. After finally reading the screenplay, Plec recalled that Craven suggested the studio "'make him an offer he can't refuse.' And so Dimension did. And he took it." The deal also granted Craven first choice on future directing projects after Scream.

Williamson later met with Craven expecting major rewrites, but Craven's notes focused largely on typographical corrections, minor additions, restoring some of the removed gore, and refining the still-developing ending. (Note: Attributed to multiple references:) Williamson recalled: "The story stayed pretty much intact, but we added some scares, and shortened it. Wes reworked some of the action sequences, and we would argue and go back and forth, but there's a point where I had to realize that Wes is more experienced than I am." Craven described the script as forcing audiences to confront the reality behind the violence they usually found entertaining in slasher films, "like the Friday the 13th type of deaths where people have arrows through their heads and kids scream and laugh. But that suddenly starts happening in their actual lives."

=== Casting ===
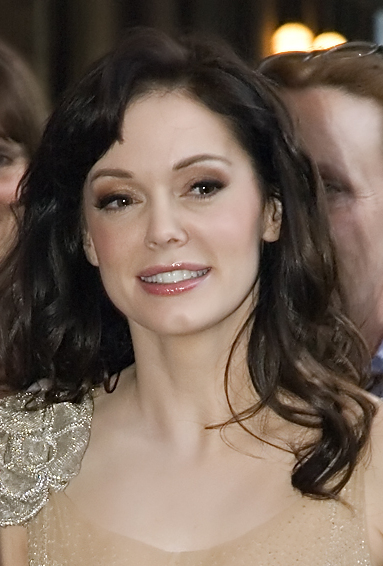
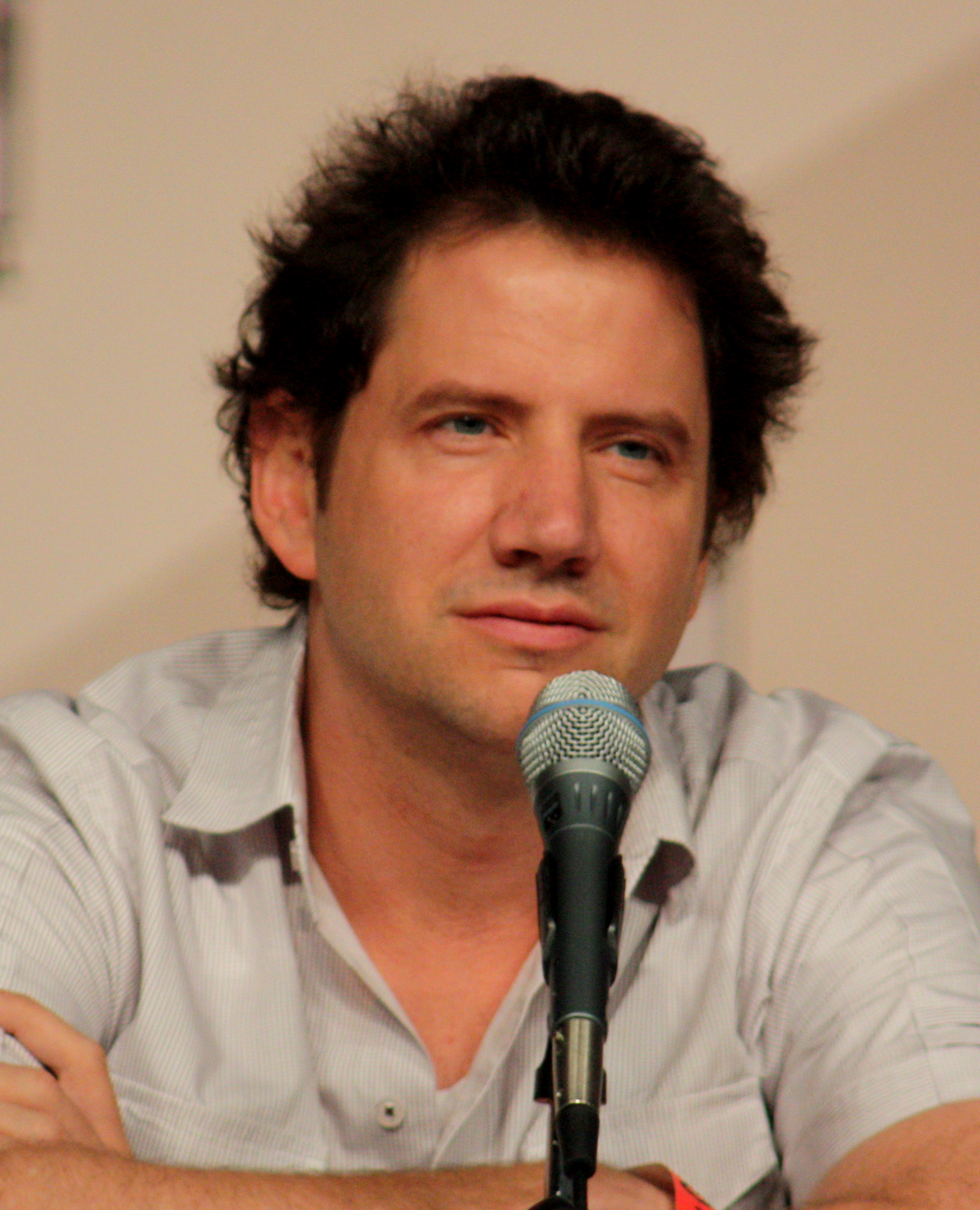
Rose McGowan (pictured in 2007) and Jamie Kennedy (2010)

Atypical for the horror genre of the period, Scream features a cast that combined established stars such as Drew Barrymore and Courteney Cox with relatively unknown younger actors. Executive producer Cary Woods used his friendship with Barrymore's agent to secure her for the lead role of Sidney Prescott, but Barrymore later requested the smaller role of Casey Becker instead. (Note: Attributed to multiple references:) Maddalena suggested Barrymore had wanted to leave the project entirely but accepted the smaller role to avoid disappointing Bob and his brother, Harvey Weinstein. The filmmakers embraced the change, believing that killing the character played by their most recognizable actor in the opening sequence would shock audiences and establish that no character was safe.

Vinessa Shaw and Reese Witherspoon were also considered for Sidney Prescott. Witherspoon was discounted because she looked too young compared to the other cast, and Williamson's choice, Molly Ringwald, believed she was too old for the part. The final choices came down to Alicia Witt, Brittany Murphy, and Neve Campbell. According to Williamson, Campbell swiftly emerged as the favored choice among the principal crew and, to improve her chances, they filmed her screen-test first, forcing the other contenders to compete against her performance. Konrad and Maddalena said Campbell brought athleticism from her dancing background with a combination of strength and vulnerability. Describing what attracted her to the role, Campbell said Sidney was "a fantastic character for any kind of movie" who transitions from "tormented, traumatized, insecure young woman to overwhelmingly empowered and strong".

Woods suggested Courteney Cox for the role of Gale Weathers because he believed casting her against type would be interesting following her personable performances in the television series Family Ties (1982–1989) and Friends (1994–2004). Craven initially doubted Cox could portray the manipulative reporter, prompting Cox to write him a letter insisting that "being 'a bitch' wouldn't be a stretch at all". Brooke Shields and Janeane Garofalo were also considered, although the filmmakers preferred a more established actress.

David Arquette auditioned for unspecified younger characters but became interested in playing Dewey because it allowed him to act opposite Cox. Although Dewey was written as a stereotypical "dumb jock", Arquette instead viewed him as "a position of authority getting no respect ... He wants to be John Wayne ... He wants to be this tough guy, but he's just got a heart of gold." Rose McGowan nearly lost the role of Tatum after her agent demanded a $250,000 salary instead of the offered $50,000—lower than the $100,000 received by some other principal actors—forcing her to audition twice for the part. McGowan also influenced aspects of the character's design, dyeing her hair blonde to avoid having two dark-haired female leads, removing an Indigo Girls poster from Tatum's bedroom because she felt the character would not listen to the older band, and replacing costume suggestions with outfits she purchased herself. Thora Birch and Natasha Lyonne also auditioned for the role, with Lyonne reportedly preferred, but because she was under 18, she could not join without parental consent.

Believing his popularity was rising, the studio favored Vince Vaughn for Billy Loomis, but illness prevented him from auditioning. Skeet Ulrich was unable to attend formal auditions because of scheduling conflicts, but casting director Lisa Beach personally went to meet with him after his girlfriend mentioned he was accompanying her to auditions. Ulrich enjoyed the opportunity to portray a serial killer after previously playing more innocent characters. To prepare for the role, he researched serial murders and psychological profiles and decorated one of his hotel rooms with punk rock posters and blacklights to help himself inhabit Billy's mindset. He said, "I was into punk music in my teens and really just trying to recapture that angst ... I would sit in there and read about serial killers and watch Faces of Death (1978)." Ulrich and Campbell had recently appeared together in The Craft (1996), which they believed helped create a natural chemistry between their characters.

Matthew Lillard initially auditioned for Billy, but casting directors felt he was unsuited to "make out with [Campbell]" and instead had him read for Stu. Craven offered him the role immediately. Seth Green, Jason Lee, and Breckin Meyer were among the preferred choices for Randy Meeks, the "lanky, gangly, opinionated fifth wheel, who really has a love and passion for movies", but Craven and Williamson favored Jamie Kennedy's mixture of innocence and comedy. Kennedy later credited Craven with supporting his casting.

W. Earl Brown, a friend of Craven's, was cast without auditioning, but did have to gain about 20 lb (9.1 kg) for the role. He had originally hoped to play Dewey. Roger L. Jackson was hired as the voice of Ghostface following his work on Mars Attacks! (1996). While other actors approached the role as a flamboyant "new Freddy Krueger", Jackson instead played Ghostface with a quieter charisma and seductive quality intended to keep victims engaged on the phone. Barrymore specifically requested an actor perform opposite her during the opening scene rather than having a crew member read the dialogue for dubbing later, and although the filmmakers initially planned to dub Jackson's performance with Tom Kane, Craven preferred Jackson's interpretation.

Henry Winkler appeared as Principal Himbry as a favor to Craven because they shared the same agent. Liev Schreiber accepted the role of Cotton Weary for $20,000 during an unrelated meeting with Bob. Lynn McCree, who portrayed Sidney's mother, was a Sonoma local who spent two hours taking photographs with Campbell for the role despite knowing little about the character's backstory. Many extras were recruited locally, including owners of restaurants frequented by the cast and crew.

=== Pre-production ===
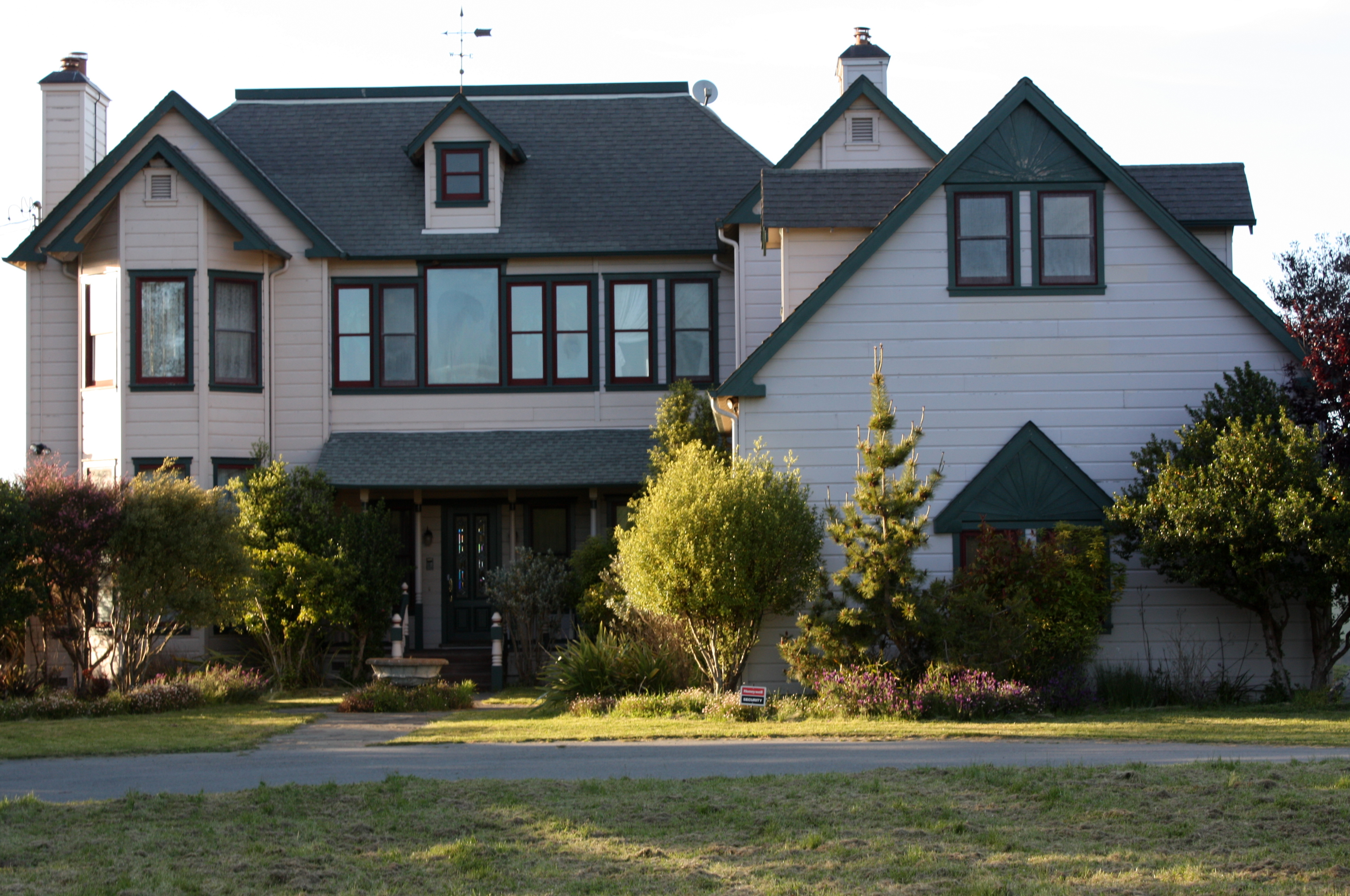
An isolated home in Tomales, California served as the location of Scream's finale.

It was determined early in production that Scream required too many interior and exterior locations to be filmed on sets. Production designer Bruce Miller said it was important to portray the characters as vulnerable within their homes, leading the filmmakers to avoid houses resembling "castles" in favor of properties where the characters appeared exposed and easily accessible to a stalker. This also made it essential to film both inside and outside the homes. Location scouts searched throughout the United States and Canada but struggled to find a suitable house for the opening scene, which required plentiful windows and strong exterior visibility. Craven initially considered Wilmington, North Carolina, but felt its architecture lacked the "very American-looking houses" he envisioned, describing many of the homes as unattractively dark or brick-built. Locations near Vancouver and in Napa County, California were rejected for similar reasons.

Santa Rosa in Sonoma County, California ultimately offered most of the features the filmmakers required, although the Weinsteins initially rejected the additional $1–2 million needed to film there. The filmmakers eventually convinced the studio that Craven's name would attract enough audiences to offset the higher cost. (Note: Attributed to multiple references:) The opening sequence was filmed at a house in Glen Ellen. Other Santa Rosa locations included Sidney's house at 1820 Calistoga Road, the interiors of Tatum's home at 824 McDonald Avenue, and the Bradley Video store where Randy works. The Healdsburg, California town square was used for Woodsboro Town Square, the fountain, and the exterior of the police station.

Stu's house was filmed at an unoccupied property in Tomales, chosen for its isolated and foreboding atmosphere. Cinematographer Mark Irwin opposed using the location because its hilltop position created logistical difficulties for transporting trailers and equipment. To compensate, Miller constructed barn facades near the property so trailers could be parked closer while remaining hidden from view. The art department heavily modified the house by adding Gothic architectural elements such as beams and stained-glass windows to create a haunted appearance, painting the walls red—they realized later this made the blood stand out less—and installing a white picket fence. The farmhouse's complex layout also provided a believable setting for multiple murders to occur without other characters immediately noticing.

Santa Rosa High School was selected to portray Woodsboro High School because of its gothic, castle-like appearance. Production intended to film there for up to ten days in early June in exchange for a $30,000–50,000 location fee, but the Santa Rosa school board ultimately denied permission in March 1996. The board cited concerns about disruption during school hours and final examinations, although some board members and residents also objected to the script's violent content. Hundreds of residents attended a public meeting to debate the production before the board voted against allowing filming.

The Sonoma Community Center ultimately served as a replacement location, requiring scenes to be rewritten and the former elementary school to be modified with larger desks and lockers to resemble a high school. Craven estimated that losing the original location and implementing the resulting production changes cost approximately $350,000, including the $27,000 paid to the community center for three days of filming. The disruption to filming by the school was not forgotten, with the film's credits stating: "No thanks whatsoever to the Santa Rosa city school district governing board."

Williamson's script described the killer only as wearing a "ghostly white mask". Special effects company KNB EFX Group was commissioned to design a mask, but the filmmakers disliked the resulting "gargoyle-ish", witch-like, and goblin-inspired concepts. During location scouting, Maddalena discovered what would become the Ghostface mask. The design, featuring a white shroud, had been created by Brigitte Sleiertin as the "Peanut-Eyed Ghost" for the novelty company Fun World in 1991, based on artwork by makeup artist Loren Gitthens. Craven and the studio initially sought ownership of the mask design and instructed KNB EFX to produce a legally distinct version with altered facial proportions, including an elongated nose and chin. Dissatisfied with the alternatives, Craven ultimately chose to use the original Fun World mask. The costume was completed with a black shroud intended to conceal the killer's body shape and movements, preventing audiences from identifying the character.

=== Filming ===
Principal photography began on April 15, 1996, with a budget of $14 million. (Note: The 1996 budget of $14 million is equivalent to $28.7 million in 2025.) The first week of filming focused on the Casey Becker scenes. To achieve the necessary emotional intensity, Barrymore recalled a sad story she had developed with Craven and deliberately hyperventilated. To further enhance her performance, Jackson was positioned outside the house during the phone-call scenes so he could see Barrymore while remaining unseen by her. Jackson was used similarly for the film's other Ghostface call sequences and never met the cast in person. He explained, "the scariest monsters are the monsters you don't see, but the monsters you make in your mind. So just having the voice to react to made it larger in their minds".

For safety reasons, stunt performers portrayed Ghostface in costume, although Craven himself performed as the killer in portions of the opening sequence. The first days of filming used a custom-designed mask created specifically for Scream, but Craven disliked the design and later reshot scenes using the Fun World mask before it was licensed. To create Casey's hanging corpse, effects artist Howard Berger rejected prosthetics in favor of a hollow mannequin that exposed the character's spine connecting the upper and lower halves of the body. Rubber and vinyl organs were added to complete the effect. For Steve Orth's death scene, KNB constructed an open-backed chair that allowed the actor to kneel behind a hollow anatomical torso filled with latex, rubber, and gelatin intestines.

After reviewing the dailies, Bob criticized Craven's footage as "workmanlike at best", believing it lacked tension and featured an inconsistent tone. He also disliked the Fun World mask, describing it as "flat" and insufficiently frightening, and ordered portions of the opening sequence re-filmed using alternative mask designs for comparison. Barrymore was similarly criticized for lacking sex appeal because of her chosen pageboy hairstyle. Williamson later recalled seeing Craven visibly deflated after receiving a call from the Weinsteins. The studio briefly considered replacing Craven and sent him dailies from films such as Nightwatch (1997) to demonstrate the tone they wanted for Scream. (Note: Attributed to multiple references:)

Konrad defended Craven to the Weinsteins, prompting Bob to dispatch Dimension executives Cary Granat and Andrew Rona to oversee the production directly. Craven, Konrad, Maddalena, and line producer Stuart M. Besser met with Granat, who requested the opening scene be reshot using each of the Weinsteins' preferred mask alternatives. Instead, the filmmakers proposed assembling the existing footage to demonstrate that the scene and mask were effective, and, if unsuccessful, the production would be cancelled. (Note: Attributed to multiple references:)

Editor Patrick Lussier worked with Craven to assemble most of the opening sequence using temporary music and sound effects. The Weinsteins barred Craven and the producers from attending the screening of the footage. Afterward, Bob reportedly told the filmmakers, "What do I know about dailies? Keep going", and approved additional financing for the production. The producers later speculated Bob had an "ulterior motive", wanting the footage completed in time for the upcoming Milan Film Festival, since edited material was typically not allowed to be screened until eight weeks after filming concluded.

The next major scene filmed featured the central cast gathered around a fountain. Ulrich later admitted he initially failed to understand that Scream combined horror with comedy and believed Lillard's and Kennedy's improvisational humor was "ruining the movie ... Like, 'This isn't funny. This isn't supposed to be funny.' And man, was I wrong." Craven encouraged improvisation throughout filming, particularly from Arquette and Lillard, while Williamson later acknowledged that many of Lillard's ad-libs improved the screenplay. (Note: Attributed to multiple references:)

=== The finale ===
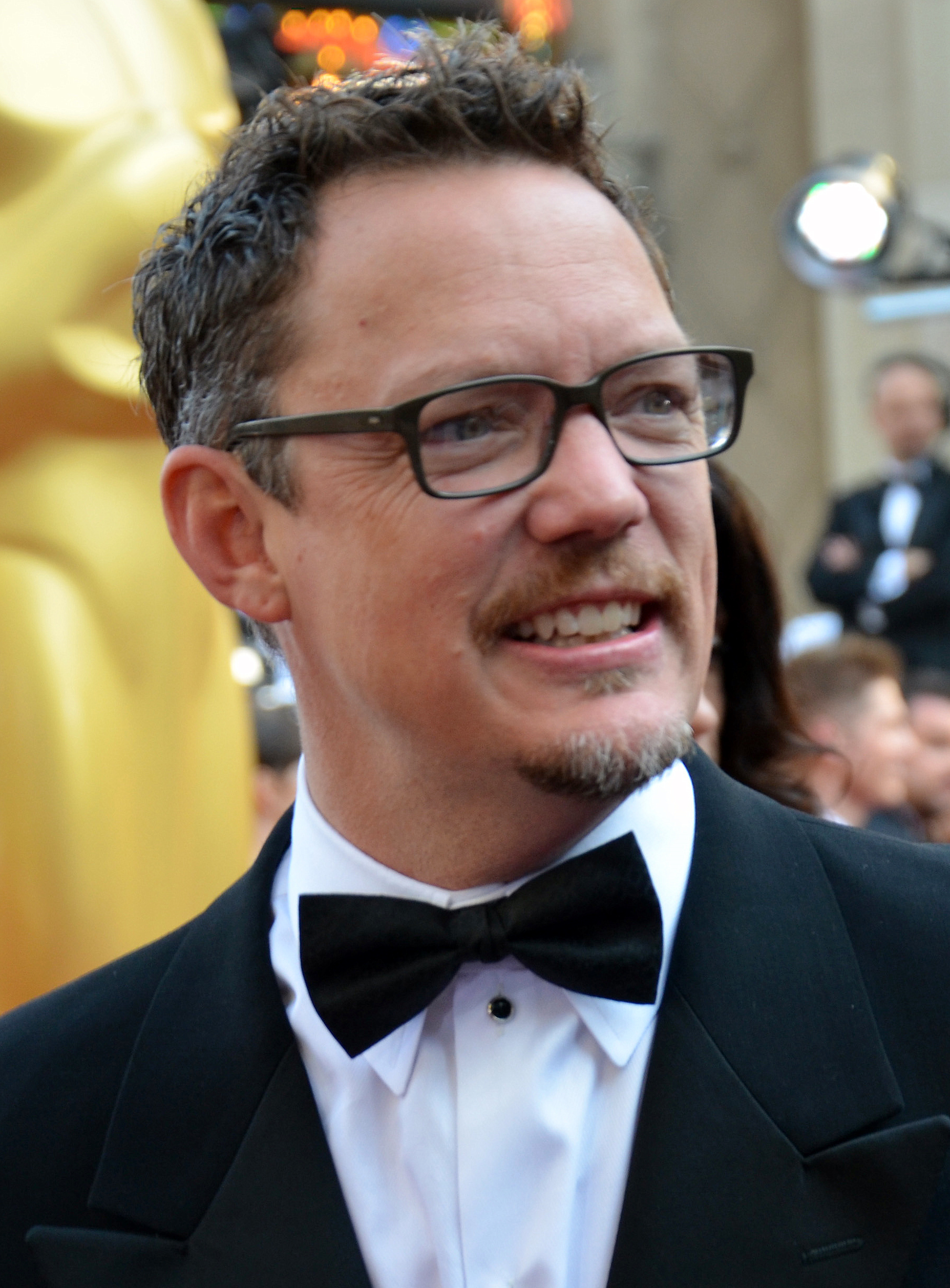
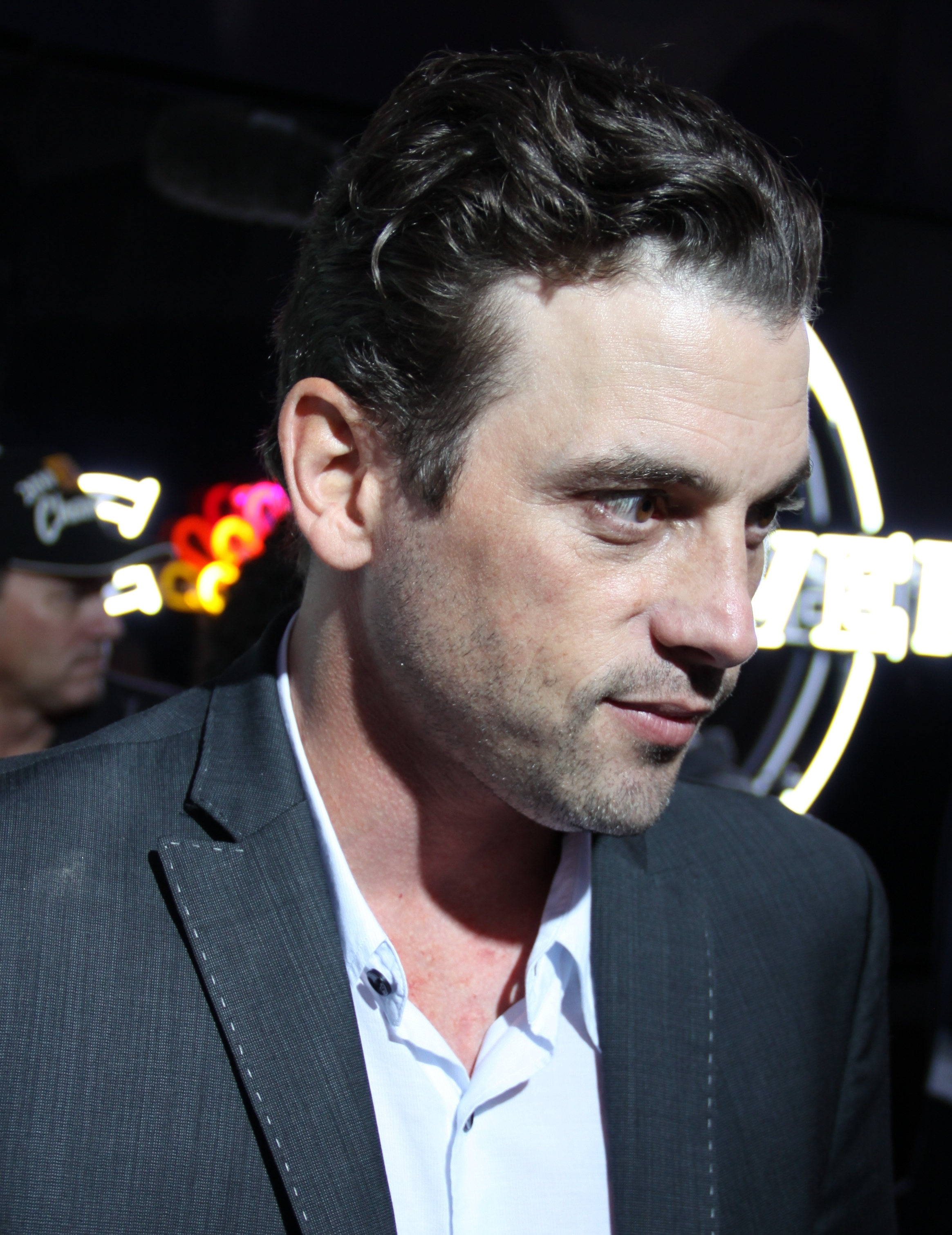
Matthew Lillard (pictured in 2012) and Skeet Ulrich (2010)

The film's 42-minute climax set at Stu's party was filmed at night over three weeks. Difficulties lighting the uneven hilltop location exacerbated tensions between Craven and cinematographer Mark Irwin over the quality of the footage. Scream was filmed using an anamorphic lens, which stretches and distorts the image to achieve a specific aspect ratio, although neither Craven nor Irwin had extensive experience with the format. Crew members, including Lussier, raised concerns about lens flares and out-of-focus shots, partly attributing the issue to the focus puller hired by Irwin. Lussier explained, "You can often tell your focus is supposed to be on somebody's eye usually, ... and the focus puller just hasn't moved with the actor". The inconsistent focus also limited editing options. Irwin later said he was informed that all of the footage was unusable and that 35 days of material needed to be reshot. Following an argument with Maddalena, he was dismissed and replaced by Peter Deming for the final three weeks of production. Irwin believed he had been made a scapegoat for the production falling behind schedule and jeopardizing Craven's salary, although Konrad denied this.

Kennedy's "rules" scene was initially filmed in a single take, but he requested additional takes because he believed he could improve the performance; Craven ultimately selected the third take. During Tatum's death scene, McGowan struggled to remain lodged in the pet door as the garage door rose, leading the crew to nail her shirt to the frame to hold her in place. Craven found the sequence difficult to balance tonally because he wanted to avoid trivializing Tatum's death while still paying homage to earlier horror films. McGowan improvised the character's screams for her mother to give the character more humanity. During the sequence in which Gale drives a van with Kenny's corpse on top, Brown was atop the vehicle while an unprepared stunt driver accelerated at full speed. When the driver suddenly braked, Brown fell off the side of the van and was only prevented from injury when the stunt coordinator grabbed his pants and ankle.

Five nights were spent filming the kitchen confrontation between Billy, Stu, and Sidney. By the time the production filmed Gale's return with a gun, Ulrich said he and Lillard were "roaming around like caged animals" to maintain the intensity of their performances, to the point that Craven asked them to calm down because they were frightening Cox. Lillard described sustaining that level of adrenaline as exhausting. Campbell, Kennedy, Lillard, and Ulrich spent multiple nights covered in fake blood, and the costumes could not be washed for continuity reasons, instead being dampened nightly to keep the blood looking fresh. When Ulrich stabbed a sofa during filming, the crew discovered it was filled with feathers, which stuck to the fake blood; Maddalena later described Craven as "nuts" for deciding to keep the feathers in the scene. Lillard improvised lines such as "My mom and dad are going to be so mad at me" and "You fucking hit me with the phone, you dick", the latter after Ulrich threw a phone near him as intended, only for the fake blood to cause it to slip and accidentally strike Lillard. Ulrich also suggested Billy crack his neck before trying to shoot Gale, with the sound effect later added in post-production. During filming, Campbell's stunt double accidentally stabbed Ulrich with the tip of an umbrella, missing his protective vest and striking the site of the open-heart surgery he had undergone as a child.

Filming concluded on June 14, 1996. The cast later recalled the production as having a "summer camp" atmosphere because of the camaraderie that developed during filming. Cast members and crew, including Craven, frequently gathered in the early mornings after filming to eat and socialize. Arquette's hotel room was converted into a makeshift nightclub where many of them congregated. Following complaints from other hotel residents, the gatherings were eventually moved to a nearby barn.

=== Post-production ===
The title Scary Movie remained in use late into production and appeared on gifts given to the cast and crew after filming concluded. Harvey suggested the replacement title Scream, inspired by the 1995 Michael and Janet Jackson song "Scream". Many cast and crew members were initially unhappy with the change. Sony Pictures later filed a lawsuit against Dimension and Miramax, claiming the title infringed on the copyright of Screamers (1995). The case was settled out of court, allowing Dimension to continue using the Scream title.

Although Dewey and Randy were killed in Williamson's script, alternate scenes were filmed in which the characters survived in case they proved popular with test screening audiences. Positive test screenings also led Miramax to ask Craven to direct two sequels.

Scream initially received an NC-17 rating from the Motion Picture Association of America, which restricted admission to viewers aged 17 and older and was considered "box-office suicide" by industry experts. The MPAA informed Craven that the film would never receive the more commercially viable R rating, which permitted younger viewers when accompanied by an adult. Craven later said, "I'm a director who can do something very well but am not allowed to put it on screen. And they ultimately get you, as they did on this one, on intensity. They say, 'it's not a specific shot, it's not blood, it's just too intense'". The filmmakers eventually persuaded the MPAA that Scream functioned as a spoof, believing they were too focused on the horror aspects.

Up to nine cuts were required to satisfy the MPAA's objections, including removing movement from Steve Orth's exposed organs, shortening Kenny's throat-slashing scene because his expression was considered too disturbing, moving Billy and Stu stabbing each other off-screen, and reducing shots of Casey's hanging corpse and Tatum's crushed head. Casey's slow-motion stabbing sequence was also considered excessive, although the MPAA ultimately allowed it with only a few frames removed because no alternate footage existed. The final cut runs for 111 minutes.

=== Music ===
Marco Beltrami – Sidney's Lament
The theme for the main character of Sidney Prescott by Marco Beltrami

Despite lacking experience in film scoring and having little interest in the horror genre, Marco Beltrami was recommended to Plec and Craven, who found his music samples more original than those of many contemporary composers. (Note: Attributed to multiple references:) Craven gave Beltrami a weekend to compose "The Cue from Hell", the score for the film's opening sequence, which secured his hiring. Beltrami approached the piece from Casey's perspective and employed an "operatic" style using instruments including piano and brass. He later described himself as "bumbling" through the scoring process because of his limited familiarity with horror music conventions. The score also incorporated influences from the western genre, particularly in Dewey's theme, as well as inspiration from composers including Elliot Goldenthal, Ennio Morricone, Eric Serra, Christopher Young, and Hans Zimmer.

Because of budget limitations, Beltrami worked with an orchestra of fewer than 50 performers. To compensate for the limited string section, he instructed the string players to whistle and recruited Craven, Lussier, Maddalena, and Woods to join in and increase the effect. Beltrami identified most strongly with Sidney Prescott and considered her theme, "Sidney's Lament", one of the score's central pieces. He deliberately avoided composing a distinctive motif for Ghostface to prevent audiences from associating the killer with a specific character.

Licensed music for Scream was provided by TVT Records and includes covers of "(Don't Fear) The Reaper" by Gus Black and "Birds Fly (Whisper to a Scream)" by Soho, as well as "School's Out" by Alice Cooper, "First Cool Hive" by Moby, and "Drop Dead Gorgeous" by Republica. Excerpts from the Halloween score are also used throughout the film.

== Release ==
=== Context ===
Over forty films were scheduled for release in late 1996, including Beavis and Butt-Head Do America, Jerry Maguire, Mars Attacks!, Ransom, Space Jam, and Star Trek: First Contact. Bob Weinstein opted to release Scream in December as counterprogramming, offering teenagers an alternative to more traditional holiday fare. The decision was unpopular with the cast and crew, with Williamson expecting the film to fail. Weinstein explained, "people said we were crazy to put out Scream over Christmas ... It was a thriller; it didn't have big stars; it couldn't compete. Well, after Beavis and Butt-Head, where is that audience going to go?"

The marketing for Scream positioned Barrymore as the lead character to intentionally shock the audience with her death. During a promotional interview, Ulrich inadvertently revealed he portrayed one of the killers and called his agent to get the story blocked.

=== Box office ===
The premiere of Scream took place on December 18, 1996, at the AVCO Theater in Westwood, Los Angeles. It was released in the United States and Canada on December 20. During its opening weekend, the film grossed $6.4 million across 1,413 theaters, making it the fourth-highest-grossing film of the weekend, behind 101 Dalmatians ($7 million), Jerry Maguire ($13.1 million), and the debut of Beavis and Butt-Head Do America ($20.1 million). Following its modest opening, some involved with the production feared Scream would be a commercial failure, with Maddalena later recalling that Variety had considered the film "DOA" ("dead on arrival"). Maddalena said that she and Craven observed a raucous audience for Beavis and Butt-Head Do America, while Scream had "maybe seven people in there. No one was laughing or screaming. We went away so dejected." However, Scream received positive audience word-of-mouth and exit-polling responses – receiving an average grade of B+ on an A+ to F scale from CinemaScore – leading the studio to increase its marketing and distribution budget. This contributed to improved performance in subsequent weeks.

Although it fell to fifth place in its second weekend, its gross increased to $9.1 million and rose again in its third weekend to $10 million, reaching third place. Scream remained in the top ten for nine weeks, becoming a surprise success and ultimately earning $103 million. This made it the 13th-highest-grossing film of 1996 and the highest-grossing slasher film of all time, until Halloween (2018). It was also Miramax's second film to gross $100 million in the United States and Canada, after Pulp Fiction (1994). The film performed most strongly among teenagers and audiences in their 20s.

Outside the United States and Canada, Scream is estimated to have earned an additional $70 million, making it the 21st-highest-grossing film. This included $13.5–$14 million in the United Kingdom, which made it the highest-grossing horror film released there at that time.

This gave the film a worldwide total of $173 million, making it the 14th-highest-grossing film of the year. (Note: The 1996 worldwide box office of $173 million is equivalent to $355 million in 2025.) After four weeks of release, it became the highest-grossing horror film in France, earning $6.2 million. In Japan, the release was postponed from May to August 1997 following the murder of a 14-year-old boy whose killer was reportedly obsessed with horror films.

Industry analysis indicated that many films released toward the end of the year underperformed, including both big-budget productions and a surge of films targeted at female audiences. Only a few were considered successful, including 101 Dalmatians, Beavis and Butt-Head Do America, Jerry Maguire, Ransom, Scream, and Star Trek: First Contact. The success of Scream triggered additional financial compensation for the principal cast and crew, tied to box office thresholds beginning at $40 million and increasing in $10 million increments up to $100 million. Kennedy noted that his first residual check was double his salary.

== Reception ==
=== Critical response ===
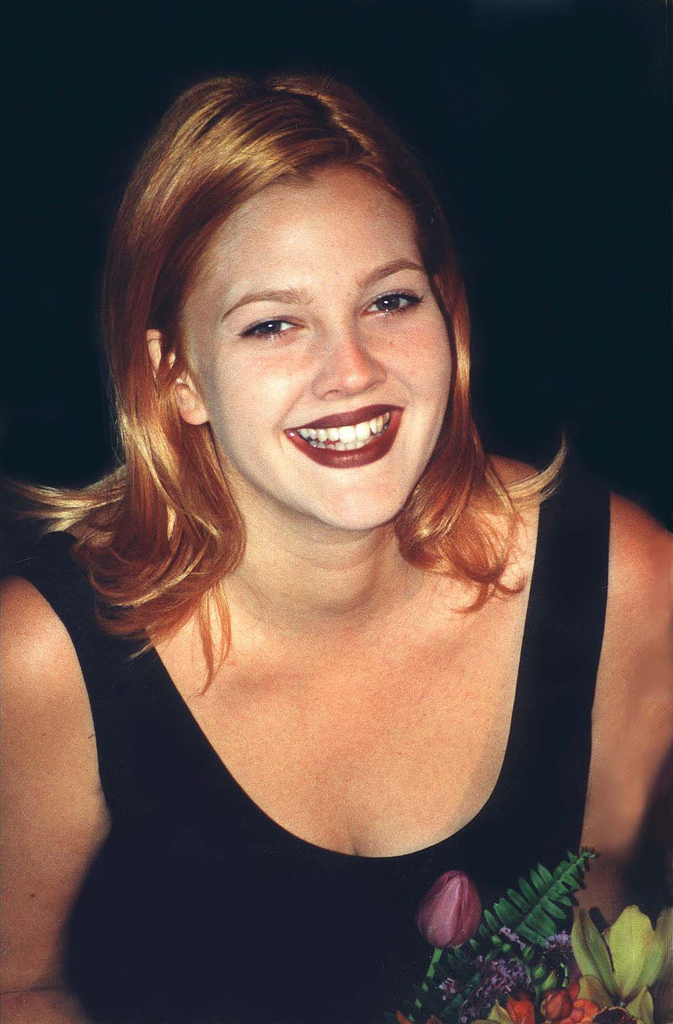
The opening scene, starring Drew Barrymore (pictured in 1997), received praise for its tension and subversion of genre expectations.

Scream received generally positive reviews, with critics highlighting its self-aware approach to the horror genre and its blend of satire and suspense. Roger Ebert, James Berardinelli, and Owen Gleiberman praised the film's awareness of horror conventions and its combination of humor and tension. Kevin Thomas and The Washington Post's Richard Harrington described it as a witty and effective send-up that remained engaging as a thriller. Marc Savlov called the film a "triumphant return to form" for Craven, while David Ansen wrote that it "puts some fun back into a very tired genre". Kim Newman wrote that the film "rigorously dissect[s]" the conventions of the slasher genre while maintaining both parody and scares. Ebert also observed that the film focused on characters shaped by their knowledge of horror films.

Other critics were more divided on how successfully the film balanced parody with horror. Berardinelli wrote that it was effective as both a spoof and a thriller, while Harrington said it mixed irony with genuine suspense. By contrast, Janet Maslin and The Seattle Times' John Hartl wrote that its emphasis on references and in-jokes became excessive, limiting its effectiveness as a horror narrative. Writing for Chicago Reader, Bill Stamets considered these references insightful, particularly the killers' motives, saying "killers without motives are far more scary." Reviews in the Chicago Tribune, Variety, the BBC and USA Today described the film as predictable, uneven, or overly self-referential, suggesting it did not fully escape the conventions it sought to critique. (Note: Attributed to multiple references:) Maslin wrote that the film's humor became "one-note", while the BBC review said that the comedic aspects disappeared by the end of the film. Some critics also said the film relied too heavily on its jokes and meta approach. Writing for The Philadelphia Inquirer, Desmond Ryan wrote that the film's blend of horror and self-referential humor was difficult to sustain, and that its final twist lacked shock value due to excessive narrative contrivance.

Reviewers were divided on how the film’s self-aware tone interacted with its violence. Ebert wrote that the irony partly offset the impact of its graphic content, though he questioned whether this diminished its disturbing effect. Maslin similarly argued that the film attempted to both mock and exploit horror violence, creating an uneasy balance between satire and brutality. Other critics suggested that this balance was not always successful, with some saying the film's humor and self-awareness reduced the effectiveness of its horror elements. At the same time, several reviewers observed that the film incorporated its violence into its satirical approach to the genre, combining gruesome imagery with humor and commentary.

Performances received generally positive attention, particularly for Neve Campbell in the lead role. Critics, including Peter Stack, Dave Kehr, and Kim Newman, highlighted her portrayal of Sidney Prescott as an effective central figure who avoids the "damsel in distress" archetype. Some critics also praised the strength of the young ensemble cast and the appeal of the characters. Cox's performance as an ambitious reporter drew mixed responses, with some critics praising her against-type performance while others found the role unconvincing. Hartl described Arquette as "goofily charming", while Thomas also offered a positive assessment. Lisa Alspector wrote that Ulrich was the only cast member to successfully balance characterization with the film's self-parody.

The film's opening sequence was frequently singled out for praise. Gleiberman and Harrington highlighted its tension and its subversion of genre expectations, while other reviewers described it as an effective and memorable opening. (Note: Attributed to multiple references:) Thomas credited the cinematography and editing for contributing to the film's pace and suspense.

=== Accolades ===
At the 23rd Saturn Awards in 1997, Scream won awards for Best Actress (Campbell), Best Writing (Williamson), and Best Horror Film. The film was named Best Movie at the MTV Movie Awards, and Campbell was nominated for Best Female Performance. Scream was named Best Film by the International Horror Guild. Craven also received the Grand Prize at the Gérardmer Film Festival.

== Post-release ==
=== Home media ===
The soundtrack of Scream was released in December 1996 by TVT Records; it sold poorly. Scream was released on VHS and LaserDisc on June 24, 1997. It was especially successful in the video rental market, becoming the second most rented film of 1997 in the United States.

In 2000, Scream was released as part of "The Ultimate Scream Collection", alongside its two sequels, Scream 2 (1997) and Scream 3 (2000). The release introduced special features including cast screen tests, outtakes, and a documentary about the making of the trilogy, featuring interviews with cast and crew. A director's cut release of Scream restored uncut sequences removed for the theatrical release.

The film was released on Blu-ray in 2011, including previously released special features. For the film's 25th anniversary in 2021, Scream was remastered and released on 4K Ultra HD Blu-ray in a steelbook case. Alongside the previously released special features, the remastered version included "A Bloody Legacy: Scream 25 Years Later", a documentary featuring new interviews with the cast and crew.

In 2022, Varèse Sarabande released the score in a limited-edition six-disc box CD set and digitally, alongside Beltrami's work on other installments, as well as unreleased music, demos, and alternate versions. A four-LP record set was released separately in a jacket that turns into a Ghostface mask.

=== Other media ===
A 2011 documentary, Still Screaming: The Ultimate Scary Movie Retrospective, documents the production of the original trilogy of Scream films and includes interviews with cast and crew from throughout the series. A book, It All Began With A Scream by Padraic Maroney, was also released that year, offering a similar look at the production of Scream and its three immediate sequels.

The popularity of Ghostface generated a variety of merchandise and licensed appearances. (Note: Attributed to multiple references:) The Billy and Stu Ghostface persona (voiced by Jackson) also appears as a playable character in Mortal Kombat 1 (2023).

== Thematic analysis ==
=== Themes ===
Scream is influenced by, and pays many homages to, the history of the horror genre, including a school janitor referencing Freddy Krueger, a cameo appearance by Linda Blair, famed for her appearance in The Exorcist (1973), and Randy admonishing the police for not watching Prom Night for advice. In a meta reference, Randy recounts the rules of the genre: to survive a horror film, characters cannot sin by drinking, taking drugs, or having sex, and they cannot say "'I'll be right back.' Because you won't be back". This self-reference is extended when Randy watches Halloween and yells at the lead character Laurie (Jamie Lee Curtis) to look behind her, oblivious to the killer approaching himself from behind, while cameraman Kenny futilely yells at Randy to do the same via a remote feed. The film also explores fandom and media consumption, with characters consciously referencing and responding to horror conventions, blurring the boundary between fiction and real-world violence.

When Sidney confronts Billy and Stu, she says, "You've seen one too many movies", to which Billy replies, "Movies don't create psychos, movies make psychos more creative." Writer Kate Gardener interpreted this dialogue as rejecting the idea that horror films inspire real-world violence. Editor Patrick Lussier said the MPAA objected to the line because "you can't speak that kind of truth".

Writers Adam White and Michelle Delgado described Scream as an exploration of the "exploitative" nature of the news media, using traumatic events as entertainment. The Independent argues that the film also satirizes modern celebrity culture, showing how violent crime and media exposure can transform individuals into public figures. The film's release coincided with growing discourse in the United States on the impact of on-screen violence and its potential consequences for society. During this time, the Clinton administration introduced the V-chip, a device designed to enable parents to block mature television content; however, news programs remained exempt from the ratings system, which Delgado said allowed them to continue exploiting violent incidents to captivate audiences.

Gale Weathers is portrayed as a relentless television reporter who uses Maureen Prescott's murder to advance her career and seeks to do the same with the Woodsboro killings. Although Gale advocates for the innocence of Cotton Weary, she does so both out of conviction and to secure a lucrative book deal. While her actions revolve around profiting from the suffering of others, she is depicted as a careerist antagonist to Sidney, who ultimately assists in stopping Billy and Stu. Gardener wrote that this reflects the commodification of crime and female trauma, noting that Scream acknowledges the audience's voyeuristic interest in violence and the monetary value placed on sensationalized crimes. Critics identified that the film not only critiques media exploitation, but implicates audiences in consuming and sustaining that demand for sensationalized violence. The film presents trauma as cyclical, repeatedly revisited and repackaged through media and public attention rather than fully resolved.

White described Williamson's script as emblematic of its time, featuring a "picture-perfect" mother raped and murdered in American suburbia and the stalking of her daughter one year later. He compared it to contemporary sensationalized cases such as the Murder trial of O. J. Simpson, Lorena Bobbitt's assault of her husband, the Long Island Lolita case, and the Gainesville Ripper. The Ripper's defence included his assertion of being influenced by films such as The Exorcist III (1990). Despite public concerns about violent media, instances of violent crime were decreasing when Scream was released, and studies failed to establish a clear causal link between violent media and real-life violence. Nonetheless, public fascination with such events contributed to the creation of a form of celebrity for victims and perpetrators, with their stories adapted into documentaries and films. In Scream, Sidney jokes that a film will be made about her experiences, a concept later realized through the in-universe Stab series.

=== Analysis ===
Author Padraic Maroney wrote that Scream was pro-feminist, depicting several final girls who actively resist the killer. He argued that the film's success demonstrated to studios that horror films, often marketed toward young male audiences, also had significant appeal to female viewers. Writer Aime Simon similarly noted that Sidney, like Craven's Nancy Thompson, is allowed to develop as a character across multiple films.

The Scream films frequently explore female trauma through characters such as Sidney and Gale, including the dangers posed by men who react violently to rejection. Gardener wrote that, whether intentional or not, the narrative conveys this theme through its portrayal of Billy and Stu, who enact violence primarily against women. Their victims include Casey Becker, who had rejected Stu, and Sidney's mother, Maureen, whom Billy blames for his parents' separation. Gardener argued that Billy's subsequent manipulation of Sidney reflects emotional abuse and that the killers represent a more grounded and realistic threat than many supernatural horror villains, deriving their horror from the danger posed by individuals within one's own community.

Scream has also been analyzed for homosexual or queer undertones, influenced by Williamson's own experiences as a gay man. He has stated that he identified with the "final girl" archetype, explaining that "as a gay kid, I related to the final girl and to her struggle because it's what one has to do to survive as a young gay kid... Subconsciously, I think the Scream movies are coded in gay survival." Several publications have highlighted the positive response from LGBTQ audiences to these themes.

Some writers, including Maroney, Brant Lewis, and Joe Lipsett, have discussed interpretations of Billy and Stu as having a homoerotic or potentially romantic dynamic. (Note: Attributed to multiple references:) Professor David Greven wrote that the pair reflect shifting notions of masculinity and underlying currents of queer desire in 1990s cinema. Physical interactions can be interpreted as queer-coded, such as Stu playfully touching Randy's earlobe or leaning on Billy during the climax before they stab each other with phallic weapons. Greven said that although it is easy to assign homosexuality to Stu because of his lack of motive to kill and apparent willingness to please his friend, Billy also features homoerotic characteristics such as the gay trope of fixating on his maternal relationship, similar to Norman Bates in Psycho, and Billy visually resembling actor James Dean, considered a queer icon.

Williamson loosely based the characters on Leopold and Loeb, who were reported to have had a homosexual relationship and committed murder to demonstrate their intellectual superiority. (Note: Attributed to multiple references:) In a 2022 interview, Williamson said he had been "very hesitant to present the gay side of me in [Scream]", describing any queerness in Billy and Stu as "a little coded and maybe accidental".

== Legacy ==
=== Cultural influence ===
In the years since its release, Scream has become a cultural touchstone. Publications such as Entertainment Weekly have described it as a cultural phenomenon. Critics at various outlets, including Variety, Vox, and Bloody Disgusting, credited Scream with popularizing self-aware, metatextual horror by openly acknowledging and subverting slasher-film conventions. (Note: Attributed to multiple references:) Randy Meeks's explanation of the "rules" of horror films became a lasting pop-culture reference.

Scream is credited with helping revitalize mainstream horror cinema after the genre had declined in popularity by the early 1990s and was considered stagnant, "dead", or "stuck in a rut" of derivative sequels. (Note: Attributed to multiple references:) The film's success contributed to a resurgence of teen-oriented horror films, influencing releases such as I Know What You Did Last Summer (1997) and Urban Legend (1998), (Note: Attributed to multiple references:) while established franchises including Halloween (Halloween H20: 20 Years Later, 1998) and Child's Play (Bride of Chucky, 1998) adopted elements of its self-aware style. (Note: Attributed to multiple references:) Critics have also credited it with paving the way for later genre-aware horror films such as Shaun of the Dead (2004) and The Cabin in the Woods (2011), while a subsequent backlash saw audiences turn away from meta-irony toward more serious subgenres such as found footage and "torture porn". Director Jordan Peele also cited Scream as an influence on his horror film Get Out (2017), particularly for its manipulation of audience expectations.

Scream is credited with launching or bolstering the careers of its principal cast, including Campbell, Lillard, and Arquette. The film's success made Williamson an in-demand screenwriter, leading to a $20-million contract with Miramax and enabling other projects such as I Know What You Did Last Summer and television series Dawson's Creek (1998–2003). Scream revitalized Craven's career and re-established him as a mainstream director. Editor Patrick Lussier credited his work on the film's opening with helping launch his directing career, beginning with Dracula 2000 (2000). Lillard described Scream as a "seminal" moment in his career.

Scream has also been cited as an influence in several violent crimes, with perpetrators sometimes adopting the Ghostface costume, including the 2006 murder of Cassie Jo Stoddart. (Note: Attributed to multiple references:) Following the Columbine High School massacre in 1999, increased scrutiny of violent media led the United States Senate Commerce Committee to review film marketing to youths. Scream's opening was cited as an example of potentially harmful content. Use of Caller ID – used to identify phone callers – also increased by 300% after the film's release.

The film has retained a large multigenerational fan base and remains widely referenced in popular culture. Ghostface has been identified as one of the franchise's most recognizable elements, and the costume remained a popular Halloween outfit decades after the film's release. The film is also the primary inspiration for the parody film Scary Movie (2000), which launched its own franchise. Variety and Entertainment Weekly wrote that the opening inquiry, "Do you like scary movies?", became one of the most famous lines in modern horror.

=== Retrospective and modern reception ===
Retrospective critics have described Scream as a modern horror classic and a "groundbreaking meta-slasher", praising its deconstruction of horror tropes and its role in revitalizing the genre. (Note: Attributed to multiple references:) The Ringer and The Hollywood Reporter credited the film's blend of satire, humor, and suspense with establishing a new benchmark for modern horror. (Note: Attributed to multiple references:) Scream spawned several sequels and a television series while remaining popular with audiences for decades. Publications including People, Fangoria, and Bloody Disgusting have described it as a cult classic and one of the most influential films in the horror genre.

Modern slashers such as Freaky (2020) and the Fear Street trilogy (2021) have been described as modernizing the formula established by Scream. Williamson believed Scream's success was due, in part, to fitting the contemporary zeitgeist when "everyone wanted to have scary and fun in their life ... If the movie had been released at any other time, I'm not sure that would've been the case". Campbell believed it connected with audiences because of its deft combination of humor, horror, and intelligence.

The film's prologue, depicting the death of Casey Becker (Barrymore), has been described as a "virtuoso" sequence, while the British Film Institute called it a "masterclass" in building tension. Casting Barrymore, then one of the film's most recognizable stars, and killing her in the opening scene subverted audience expectations and signalled that "anyone could die". According to film critic Adam Nayman and Vox, Sidney Prescott exemplifies the classic final girl: self-aware, resourceful, and attuned to the anxieties of a 1990s teen audience. Her portrayal, they argue, influenced the depiction of subsequent horror heroines in films like The Descent (2005) and Jennifer's Body (2009). The role of Sidney Prescott has been described as central to the film's legacy and enduring appeal.

The film's $173 million global gross laid the foundation for what later became a "horror franchise juggernaut". It remained the highest-grossing entry in the Scream film series until the release of Scream 7 (2026), not accounting for inflation. The franchise is also one of the highest-grossing horror franchises, alongside Halloween, Saw, and The Conjuring Universe.

On Rotten Tomatoes, the film holds an approval rating of 78% from the aggregated reviews of 130 critics. The consensus reads: "Horror icon Wes Craven's subversive deconstruction of the genre is sly, witty, and surprisingly effective as a slasher film itself, even if it's a little too cheeky for some". The film has a score of 66 out of 100 on Metacritic based on 25 critics, indicating "generally favorable" reviews. In 2008, Empire ranked the film number 482 on its list of "the 500 Greatest Movies of All Time".

== Sequels and television series ==
Due to the success of Scream, development of a sequel began while the original was still in theaters. Scream 2 (1997) achieved similar financial and critical success as Scream. Williamson was unavailable to write Scream 3 (2000) and was replaced by Ehren Kruger. Although commercially successful, the film received a weaker critical response than its predecessors and is often regarded as one of the franchise's most divisive entries.

Williamson returned to the series with Scream 4 (2011). While Scream 4 has been positively reassessed since its release, its modest box office and critical reception on its release, as well as Craven's death, placed the franchise on hold.

A television adaptation, Scream (2015–2019), ran for three seasons. The Weinsteins prohibited references to the films and refused to license the Fun World costume, decisions that proved controversial with fans. The series later faced backlash and low ratings before being canceled.

The film series was relaunched with Scream (2022), and its success led to immediate development of a sixth installment, Scream VI (2023). Both films are directed by Matt Bettinelli-Olpin and Tyler Gillett, and written by James Vanderbilt and Guy Busick. These films focus on a younger cast, including Melissa Barrera and Jenna Ortega, with Campbell, Cox, and Arquette appearing in supporting roles. Scream VI was the first film in the series not to feature Campbell, who declined to return following a dispute over pay, or Arquette. Williamson took over as director for Scream 7 (2026), with Campbell reprising her role in the absence of Barrera and Ortega. Marked by production controversy, it became the highest-grossing entry in the series but received generally negative reviews. An eighth film is in development.
