= Casey Becker =

Fictional character in the Scream film series

- Scream character
- Drew Barrymore as Casey Becker in Scream
- First appearance: Scream (1996)
- Last appearance: Scream 4 (2011)
- Created by: Kevin Williamson
- Portrayed by: Drew Barrymore (Scream); Heather Graham (Scream 2)
- Voiced by: Megumi Hayashibara (Scream Japanese dubbed version); Paola Valentini (Scream Italian dubbed version); Virginie Ledieu (Scream European French dubbed version); Christine Bellier (Scream Canadian French dubbed version); Nuria Mediavilla (Scream European Spanish dubbed version); Jessica Ortiz (Scream Latin American 2nd dubbed version); Claudia Lössl (Scream German dubbed version); Letícia Quinto (Scream Portuguese 1997 dubbed version); Silvia Suzy (Scream Portuguese 2011 dubbed version)

In-universe information
- Significant others: Steve Orth (deceased); Stu Macher (former; deceased)
- Relatives: Mr. and Mrs. Becker (parents)
- Location: Woodsboro, California, United States
- Status: Deceased

Casey Becker is a fictional character from the Scream franchise, first appearing in the 1996 film Scream, as its false protagonist. The character was created by Kevin Williamson and originated by American actress Drew Barrymore. Casey was subsequently played by Heather Graham in Scream 2 for its movie-within-a-movie scenes. Casey and Steve Orth, her boyfriend, are the first characters to be killed on-screen in the franchise, in what has been called "one of the most famous scenes of all time."

== Appearances ==
Casey Becker first appears in Scream for the initial twelve minutes of the film. In 1997's Scream 2, the second installment of the Scream franchise, the character appears in a film-within-a-film titled Stab. Archival footage of Heather Graham as Casey in Stab from Scream 2 is reused in Scream 4 as part of the viewing at a theme party. The character Casey also appears briefly in Scream VI in a recreation of the first Stab movie made by character Richie Kirsch.

=== Other appearances ===
In October 2020, Barrymore unofficially revived the character for a short video skit titled What if Casey Becker from Scream Lived? on The Drew Barrymore Show in which she gets texts from the killer on her cell phone, but ignores him.

== Casting and development ==
Screenwriter Kevin Williamson created the character when he started the script for Scream (1996). Initially, filmmakers did not think to cast a well-known actress for Casey's part, as the character dies in the opening of the film. Drew Barrymore was initially cast as lead character Sidney Prescott (eventually played by Neve Campbell), but opted to take the role of Casey instead to break the trope of high-profile actresses never dying in horror films. Barrymore stated:

"In the horror film genre, my biggest pet peeve was that I always knew the main character was going to be slugging through at the end, but was going to creak by and make it. What I wanted to do is to take that comfort zone away. I asked if I could be Casey Becker so we would establish this rule does not apply in this film."

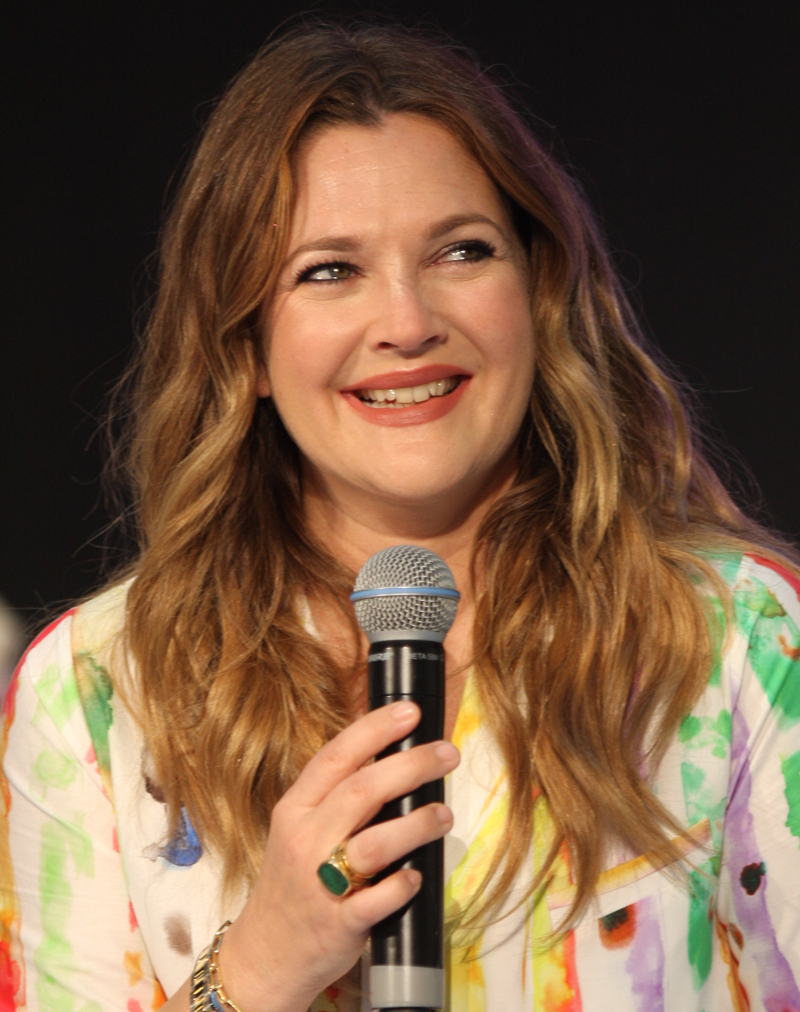
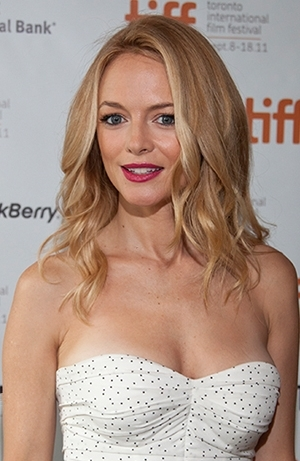
Actresses Drew Barrymore (left, pictured in 2014) and Heather Graham (right, pictured in 2011) have both portrayed the character

Casey's scenes were shot over five days, independent from the rest of the movie. At first, Dimension Films studio did not appreciate the dailies of this scene and almost fired director Wes Craven until they saw the footage cut together and were impressed.

In the Japanese dubbed version of the film, voice actress Megumi Hayashibara dubs Barrymore's lines. In Scream 2 (1997), the character Casey appears in Stab, in-universe film, played by Heather Graham.

== Fictional biography ==
Casey Becker is a 17-year-old Woodsboro teenager and the former girlfriend of Stu Macher, a main character in Scream. After receiving a taunting and threatening phone call, she is ordered to answer horror film trivia questions to save the life of her 18-year-old boyfriend, football player Steve Orth (portrayed by actor Kevin Patrick Walls). When Casey answers incorrectly, Steve is disemboweled on her porch and she is asked another question to save her own life. When she refuses to answer, Ghostface chases her down and kills her, leaving her disemboweled and hanged from a tree, where she is discovered by her mother Mrs. Becker.

== Reception ==
Since Barrymore was featured so heavily in promotional materials, the character being killed off was a "huge shocker that let the audience know that Scream was a film where all bets were off." WhatCulture stated Casey was "the tone-setter for Scream and for the larger Scream franchise."

In his 2017 book Scream, author Steven West dissects the character, the way she acts in the film, and her appearance, writing "Drew Barrymore's previously exploited sex appeal... is deemphasized [with an] unbecoming bob wig..."

Writing for Comic Book Resources in January 2022, Renaldo Matadeen stated Casey was "Screams most iconic victim". Collider's Robert Brian Taylor called the appearance of Casey and her killing as "the defining point of the franchise." The Nerd Stash named Casey's killing as their number one "best kill" of the series. Polygon ranked Casey as number 5 on their top 40 Scream characters list, behind Gale Weathers (1), Sidney Prescott (2), Randy Meeks (3), and Dewey Riley (4). As the Polygon list was released in 2019, it does not include characters from 2022's Scream or 2023's Scream VI.

=== Accolades for performances ===
Barrymore's performance as Casey earned her a nomination for Best Supporting Actress at the 1996 23rd Saturn Awards. She lost the award to Alice Krige who played the Borg Queen in Star Trek: First Contact.

While Graham's part in Scream 2 was a bit part, her performance received positive reviews. E! News considered her one of the best Scream franchise cameos, and Digital Spy called it a "prominent cameo". Giant Freakin Robot called Graham's performance one of her "memorable bit roles". The Guardian stated she "...upped her teen-cool stakes [with the] wink-wink role" and that "her talent outshone her co-stars." Parade stated along with Tori Spelling (who played Sidney) and Luke Wilson (who played Billy Loomis), Graham was "wickedly deadpan" in her performance.
