= Bergstrom =

Bergstrom or Bergström is a Swedish surname. It derives from the Swedish words berg meaning mountain and ström meaning stream and may refer to:

== Notable people ==
- Alexander Bergström (born 1986), Swedish professional ice hockeyer
- Alfred Bergström (1869–1930), Swedish artist and art professor
- Anders Bergström (cross-country skier) (born 1968), Swedish cross-country skier
- Anders Bergström (weightlifter) (born 1966), Swedish weightlifter
- Anna Bergström, Swedish curler
- Art Bergstrom (died 2006), American football player, coach, and collegiate athletic director
- Beata Bergström (1921–2016), Swedish photographer
- Bobo Bergström (born 1964), chef and restaurateur
- C. W. Bergstrom (born 1957), American professional wrestler
- Carl Bergstrom (born 1971), theoretical and evolutionary biologist and a professor
- Christian Bergström (born 1967), Swedish tennis player
- Cynthia Bergstrom, a costume designer
- Dana Bergstrom (born 1962), researcher at the Australian Antarctic Division
- Danelle Bergstrom (born 1957), Australian visual artist
- David Bergström (1858–1946), Swedish politician
- Dick Bergström (1886–1952), Swedish sailor who competed in the 1912 Summer Olympics
- Don Bergstrom (born 1945), American politician and educator
- E. Alexander Bergstrom (1919–1973), American ornithologist, editor, and conservationist
- Elaine Bergstrom, American author
- Emil Bergström (born 1993), Swedish footballer
- Erik Bergström (1886–1966), Swedish amateur football (soccer) player
- Fredrik Bergström (badminton) (born 1975), Swedish badminton player
- George Bergstrom (1876–1955), US architect
- Gösta Bergström (1903–1988), Swedish long-distance runner
- Gunilla Bergström (1942–2021), Swedish writer
- Gustaf Bergström (1884–1938), Swedish footballer
- Hans Bergström (born 1948), Swedish-American journalist and political scientist
- Harald Bergström (1908–2001), Swedish mathematician, specializing in probability theory
- Harry Bergström (1910–1989), Finnish pianist, conductor, and composer
- Helena Bergström (born 1964), Swedish actress
- Hjalmar Bergström (skier) (1907–2000), Swedish skier
- Hjalmar Bergström (writer) (1868–1914), Dutch writer
- James Bergstrom, American musician
- Jerri Bergström (born 1963), Swedish fencer
- Jonas Bergström, Swedish lawyer
- Kajsa Bergström (born 1981), Swedish curler
- Karl Bergström (1937–2018), Swedish welterweight boxer
- Katie Bergstrom, former New York City Ballet dancer
- Kris Bergstrom (born 1976), North American taiko player
- Kristian Bergström (born 1974), retired Swedish footballer
- Kurt Bergström (1891–1955), Swedish ice hockey coach
- Lars Bergström (ice hockey) (born 1956), Swedish ice hockey manager
- Lars Bergström (philosopher), Swedish philosopher
- Lars Bergström (physicist) (born 1952), Swedish professor of theoretical physics
- LaVonne Bergstrom (1928–2001), American otolaryngologist
- Lena Bergström (born 1961), Swedish textiles and glass designer
- Malin Bergström, child psychologist and scientist
- Micheal Bergstrom (born 1957), Oklahoma State Senator
- Niklas Bergström (born 1974), Swedish sport shooter
- Nils Bergström (athlete) (1898–1988), Swedish long-distance runner
- Nils Bergström (bandy), Swedish bandy and football player
- Nils Bergström (ice hockey) (born 1985), Swedish ice hockey player
- Olof Bergström (1919–1984), Swedish actor
- Oscar Bergström (1903–1961), Swedish boxer
- Rex Bergstrom (1925–2005), New Zealand econometrician
- Robert W. Bergstrom (1918–2006), lawyer
- Roland Bergström, a Swedish football manager and player
- Rune Bergström (1891–1964), Swedish football player
- Sheldon Bergstrom (died 2023), Canadian actor
- Stig Bergström (born 1935), Swedish-American paleontologist
- Stina Bergström (born 1958), Swedish politician
- Sune Bergström (1916–2004), Swedish biochemist
- Sven Bergström (born 1951), Swedish Centre Party politician
- Tony Bergstrom (born 1986), American footballer
- Torsten Bergström (1886–1948), Swedish director and actor
- Viktor Bergström (born 1986), Swedish speedway rider
- William Lee Bergstrom (1951–1985), American gambler

== Places ==
- Bergstrom Air Force Base, military base seven miles southeast of Austin, Texas
- Austin–Bergstrom International Airport, Class C international airport in Austin, Texas

== See also ==
- Bergstrom Nutrition, a United States dietary supplement manufacturer
- Stromberg
- People of Sweden
- Swedish language
