= Lars Bergström =

Lars Bergström may refer to:

- Lars Bergström (ice hockey) (born 1956), Swedish ice hockey manager
- Lars Bergström (philosopher), Swedish philosopher
- Lars Bergström (physicist) (born 1952), Swedish professor of theoretical physics
