= Grandma Got Run Over by a Reindeer (film) =

2000 film by Phil Roman

- DVD cover
- Genre: Christmas special Fantasy; Comedy drama Mystery; Musical
- Written by: Jim Fisher; Jim Staahl
- Story by: Fred A. Rappoport; Elmo Shropshire; Jim Fisher; Jim Staahl
- Directed by: Phil Roman
- Voices of: Elmo Shropshire; Michele Lee; Alex Doduk; Susan Blu; Cam Clarke; Christopher Gaze; Phil Hayes; Scott McNeil; Pauline Newstone; Maggie Blue O'Hara; Venus Terzo; Jim Fisher; Jim Staahl; Kathleen Barr
- Narrated by: Elmo Shropshire
- Composers: Nathan Wang; Randy Brooks
- Countries of origin: United States; Canada
- Original language: English

Production
- Executive producers: Fred A. Rappoport; Phil Roman
- Producers: Jim Fisher; Noel-Quinn Roman; Jim Staahl
- Running time: 51 minutes
- Production companies: The Fred Rappoport Company, Inc. Phil Roman Entertainment; Film Roman (uncredited)

Original release
- Network: The WB
- Release: October 31, 2000

Grandma Got Run Over by a Reindeer is a 2000 animated Christmas television special directed by Phil Roman. The special was first released on home video on October 31, 2000, and then aired on The WB network on December 21, 2001. The title and story are based on the 1979 novelty song of the same name.

The film subsequently airs on The CW (the successor to The WB) every year mainly in November. It has also aired on AMC, Cartoon Network, Boomerang, and Freeform.

== Plot ==
Jake Spankenheimer's grandmother owns a small general store in the large city of Cityville. The store happens to be the only piece of property not owned by Austin Bucks, the wealthiest man in town, whose corporation specializes in making Christmas easier and less involved for the town's busy residents. Grandma tells Austin that his method of trying to make Christmas easier is not really for the best and refuses to sell the store. The greedy Cousin Mel, who plans to sell the store anyway, sabotages Grandma's fruitcake by adding an ingredient with hopes that they won't sell.

Jake and his grandparents are the only ones in the family to believe in Santa Claus, further supported by them witnessing Grandma get run over by Santa's reindeer diving down on her on Christmas Eve. The following morning, Grandma is confirmed missing by police as an imprint of her is found in the snow, along with her belongings. Cousin Mel finds a letter that she quickly hides from the others.

Nine months pass without Grandma and the store's business drops. During this time, Cousin Mel comes up with a new plan to sell the store to Austin by tricking Grandpa into giving her his power of attorney. When Jake objects, Austin agrees to give him another week in order to find Grandma before going through with the deal. Adamant in his belief that Santa ran over her, Jake emails Santa and soon Quincy, Santa's head elf, comes to take Jake to the North Pole, explaining Santa took Grandma back to the North Pole for medical treatment but she developed amnesia from the accident and until receiving Jake's e-mail Santa had no idea of who she was. After Jake explains the situation, Santa, Quincy and Grandma agree to go with him to stop the deal.

When they arrive in Cityville, however, Cousin Mel and her attorney, I.M. Slime, quickly trick Grandma into accompanying them. After Santa explains to Austin what has happened, Jake and Quincy discover that Grandma has disappeared once again. Cousin Mel uses the chance to accuse Santa of being behind her disappearance and put him on trial for kidnapping, leaving the scene of an accident and "sleighicular negligence". Cousin Mel and I.M. Slime then plot to sue him, believing that someone who can pay for billions of presents must be incredibly wealthy.

Three months later, Jake's sister Daphne suspects that Cousin Mel may have been involved in Grandma's second disappearance and Jake and Quincy follow her to a cabin in the woods where she and I.M. Slime are keeping Grandma out of sight. They rescue Grandma and find Santa's letter explaining what happened, that Cousin Mel had found at the site of Grandma's accident and also what Cousin Mel had added to Grandma's fruitcake that Christmas Eve night, which had the effect of "reindeer-nip" irresistible to reindeer. They restore Grandma's memory by feeding her some of her own fruitcakes and, after filling her in on the situation, rush to the courthouse. Arriving just before the judge could rule Santa "guilty" for the charges leveled against him, Jake presents the judge and jury with the evidence vindicating Santa of his crimes and Grandma reunites with the family.

Confronted with the evidence, Cousin Mel is arrested for obstructing justice and "almost ruining Christmas", and the judge lets Santa go after the truth is uncovered. Meanwhile, Austin realizes how much the family cares about their business, so he offers to franchise Grandma's store throughout the country. Later, Grandma accidentally opens up Cousin Mel's reindeer nip spiked fruitcake, causing the reindeer to run her over again, though she comes out unharmed this time as Jake and Grandpa help her back to her feet while Santa and Mrs. Claus return home to the North Pole.

== Characters ==
- Grandma Spankenheimer (voiced by Susan Blu) – Jake, Cousin Mel and Daphne's loving grandmother and Frank's mother who loves Christmas. Grandma is the owner of a general store in Cityville. Merchandise at the store includes ornaments, toys, and Grandma's famous "Killer Fruitcake".
- Jake Spankenheimer (voiced by Alex Doduk) – Jake leads the search for Grandma when he witnesses Grandma being hit by Santa's sleigh. A firm believer in Santa Claus, Jake must use his spirit, smarts and determination to uncover the truth.
- Cousin Melanie "Mel" Spankenheimer (voiced by Michele Lee) – Cousin Mel is Jake and Daphne's Cousin, Frank and Rita's Niece and Grandma and Grandpa's Granddaughter. A greedy woman who only cares about money. She is out to sell the store to the wealthy Austin Bucks, and makes Santa Claus the fall guy in a lawsuit over Grandma's disappearance so she can get all his money. Her partner in crime is her lawyer, I.M. Slime, who is also in on Mel's scheme. Other than simply "a cousin" it's unclear as to her exact relationship within the family or even if she is a Spankenheimer.
- Grandpa Spankenheimer & The Narrator (both voiced by Elmo Shropshire) – Jake, Cousin Mel and Daphne's grandfather, Grandma's goofy husband, Frank's father and Rita's father-in-law. Grandpa accidentally gives Cousin Mel power of attorney, giving Cousin Mel the power to sell Spankenheimer's General Store to Austin Bucks. The narrator is established as an adult Jake telling the story.
- Austin Bucks (voiced by Cam Clarke) – A monopolizing store tycoon who wants to buy the store from the Spankenheimers, but is completely unaware of Cousin Mel's plots and gives Jake the opportunity to prove his story, despite his doubts.
- Santa Claus (voiced by Jim Staahl) – A jolly old man who delivers gifts around the world on Christmas Eve. Santa accidentally runs over Grandma with his reindeer-drawn sleigh, and takes her to his hospital at his North Pole workshop.
- Mrs. Claus (voiced by Kathleen Barr) – Her only appearances are reading an article in the newspaper about her husband getting arrested and standing by him in court and flying home with him after he is acquitted.
- Daphne Spankenheimer (voiced by Maggie Blue O'Hara) – Jake's teenage sister, Frank and Rita's daughter and Grandma and Grandpa's granddaughter. Daphne is skeptical over the existence of Santa and less apt to helping Grandma than Jake is, but is not as apathetic as Cousin Mel. Despite this, she figures out Mel is the suspect.
- Frank Spankenheimer (voiced by Scott McNeil) – Jake and Daphne's father, Cousin Mel's uncle and Grandma and Grandpa's son.
- Rita Spankenheimer (voiced by Kathleen Barr) – Jake and Daphne's mother, Cousin Mel's aunt and Grandma and Grandpa's daughter-in-law.
- I.M. Slime (voiced by Kathleen Barr) – Cousin Mel's money-loving attorney and accomplice.
- Officers (voiced by Jim Fisher and Kathleen Barr) – Two police officers who investigate Grandma's disappearance and later arrest Cousin Mel.
- Quincy (voiced by Philip Maurice Hayes) – Santa's head elf who acts as Santa's advisor and helps Jake find Grandma and clear Santa's name.
- The Judge (voiced by Pauline Newstone) – The judge preceding over Santa Claus's trial for the disappearance of Grandma Spankenheimer.

== Production ==
Elmo Shropshire initially pitched the adaptation of "Grandma Got Run Over by a Reindeer" as being more irreverent in nature and compared his initial vision for the special as being more in line with South Park or Family Guy when it came to humor and tone. The producers however hired additional rewrites to tone down Shropshire's premise and position it as something for a broader family audience. Shropshire felt the film would've been funnier had they gone further with the humor, but was ultimately satisfied with the result. While Shropshire appears in the special as the narrator and Grandpa, the majority of the songs Shropshire wrote for the special (including the titular song) were sung by Gary Chase the special's music orchestrator and not Shropshire himself. In 2015 interview, Shropshire said this came about from a disagreement between himself and one of the producers over merchandising royalties which led to Shropshire refusing to authorize usage of his recordings in the special.

== Songs ==
All tracks are written by Nathan Wang, Elmo Shropshire and Rita Abrams, except "Jingle Bells," written by James Lord Pierpont

| No. | Title | Performer(s) | Length |
|---|---|---|---|
| 1. | "Grandma Got Run Over by a Reindeer" | Gary Chase | 3:31 |
| 2. | "Grandpa's Gonna Sue The Pants Offa' Santa" | Michele Lee | 3:15 |
| 3. | "Feels Like Christmas" | Gary Chase | 2:50 |
| 4. | "Grandma's Spending Christmas With The Superstars" | Gary Chase | 2:42 |
| 5. | "Grandma's Killer Fruitcake" | Gary Chase | 2:25 |
| 6. | "Jingle Bells" | Gary Chase | 2:50 |

== Home media ==
Warner Home Video (owned by Time Warner Entertainment, the then-part owner of the WB network) released Grandma Got Run Over by a Reindeer to VHS on October 31, 2000, and to DVD on October 16, 2001.

== Reception ==
Writing for Animation World Network, Jerry Beck liked the film, writing that it's "obvious the writers, actors and crew did the best they could with the (low) budget… [it has] echoes of It's a Wonderful Life and Miracle on 34th Street", and concluded, "it may disappoint a few adults". Meanwhile, in a syndicated review of the film, Evan Levine gave the film a mixed rating, opining that the film's story was contrived and had "slightly garish" animation. Levine concluded that the original song's popularity did not guarantee a good film adaptation out of it.

== See also ==
- List of Christmas films
- Santa Claus in film
