= Tullinge Church =

Coordinates: 59°12′49″N 17°52′54″E

- Tullinge kyrka
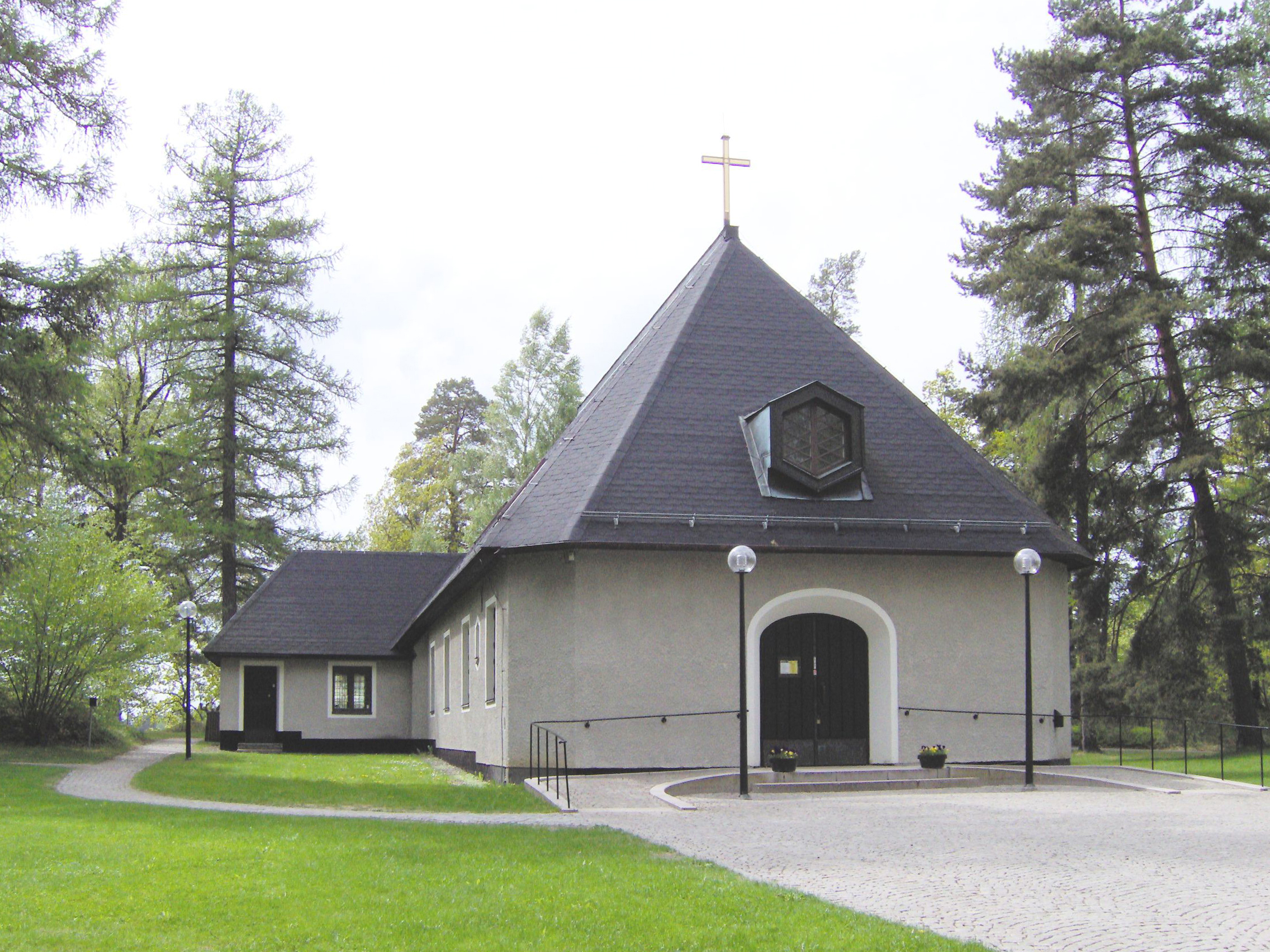
- Tullinge Church
- Country: Sweden
- Denomination: Church of Sweden

History
- Consecrated: 1958

Administration
- Diocese: Stockholm

Tullinge Church (Swedish: Tullinge kyrka) is a church building in Tullinge, Botkyrka, Sweden.

== See also ==
- Tumba Church
