= Alfred Bergström =

Swedish artist and art professor

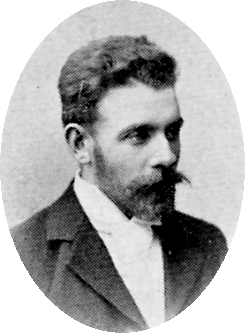
Alfred Bergström, from the Svenskt Porträttgalleri XX

Alfred Maurits Bergström (15 January 1869, Stockholm - 15 November 1930, Tullinge) was a Swedish artist and art professor at the Royal Swedish Academy of Fine Arts who worked as a painter, watercolorist and etcher.

== Biography ==
His father, Jan Alfred, was an engraver and, at the age of thirteen, he began studying in his father's workshop. He attended the Royal Academy from 1887 to 1891 and was awarded a gold medal upon graduating. From 1894 to 1895, he lived in France on a scholarship. He also visited North Africa and the Netherlands. In Sweden, he painted seascapes and landscapes en plein aire. Many of his later works involved cityscapes in and around Stockholm. Winter motifs were a special favorite of his.

From 1898 to 1901, he taught landscape painting at the Academy; becoming a member there in 1900. From 1910 until his death, he was a Professor there. He was Chairman of the Svenska konstnärernas förening (an artists' association) for the years 1911 to 1913. From 1900 to 1915, he served as one of a panel of experts that reviewed the statues at the Nationalmuseum. As a result of their recommendations, the entire collection was reorganized.

In 1908, a group of artists was commissioned to create new murals for the marble foyer of the Royal Dramatic Theatre. In addition to Bergström, this group included Carl Larsson, Gottfrid Kallstenius and Gustaf Cederström.

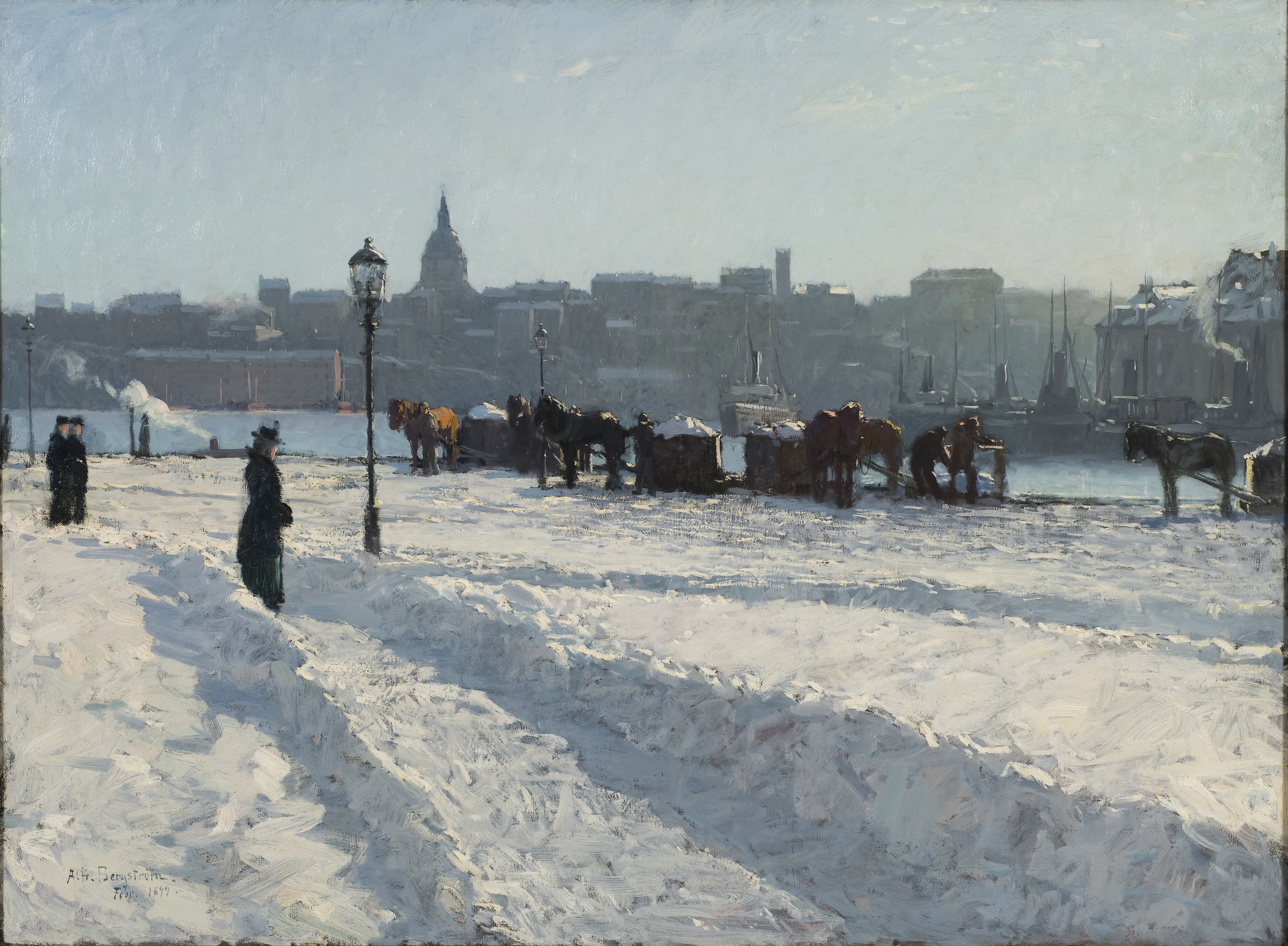
Winter Scene on the Stockholm Waterfront

The architect Gustaf Petterson designed a villa with a studio for Bergström in 1907, the year he married Augusta Gyllensvaan, an army officer's daughter.

His younger brother was the opera singer, Oscar Bergström.

== Sources ==
- Brief biography @ the Konstnärlexikonett Amanda
- Biography from Svensk konst och svenska konstnärer i nittonde århundradet @ Project Runeberg
- Biography @ the Svenskt biografiskt lexikon
- Biography from the Nordisk Familjebok (1904) @ Project Runeberg
