= Alex Doduk =

American actor

Alexander Doduk is an American voice actor and former child actor who is well known for his roles in the films: Barbie in the Nutcracker (2001), Scary Godmother (2003), The Impossible Elephant (2001) and in the animated series Brain Powered. He was the first voice of Lan Hikari for 14 episodes (1-5, 9–17) on the English version of Megaman NT Warrior before Brad Swaile became the voice for Lan. Doduk has voiced in other English dubs of anime, such as Inuyasha and the Ocean dub of Escaflowne. He was also José on Cybersix. He provided the voice of Vega Obscura in the English version of Zoids: New Century Zero. In 2000, Doduk voiced Jake Spankenheimer in Grandma Got Run Over by a Reindeer.

Doduk retired from acting in 2003. He became a police officer for the Edmonton Police Service as an adult. In November 2019, Doduk was arrested for punching and hitting a man with a police baton. The event was recorded through security footage. In June 2025, he was acquitted of all assault charges.

== Filmography ==
- Moment of Truth: A Child Too Many (1993) (Television film) as Aaron Jr.
- Dangerous Indiscretion (1995) as Matthew
- Brothers Destiny (1995) (Television film) as Martin
- Have You Seen My Son (1996) (Television film) as Ace Pritcher
- The Rainbow Fish (1997) (Direct-to-video) (Credited as Alex Doduck) as Fish with Gray & Purple fins (Line: "You bet we have")
- Dog's Best Friend (1997) (Television film) as Kid at School
- Melty Lancer (1999) (Direct-to-video) as Rufus (Voice) (English Dub Only)
- Grandma Got Run Over by a Reindeer (2000) as Jake Spankenheimer (Voice)
- Kong (2000)
- Head over Heels (2001) as Boy with Crutches
- The Impossible Elephant (2001) as Trout
- Barbie in the Nutcracker (2001) (Direct-to-video) as Tommy (Voice)
- Scary Godmother: Halloween Spooktakular (2003) (Credited as Alex Dodok) as Jimmy (Voice)

=== Television ===
- The X-Files (1994) as Young Samuel (Episode: Miracle Man)
- The New Adventures of Madeline (1995) Additional Voices (2000 only)
- The Vision of Escaflowne(1996) as Prince Chid (Voice) (English Dub, Bandai Entertainment dub)
- Brain Powerd (1998) as Yukio (Voice) (English Dub)
- Master Keaton (1998-1999) as Teen Charlie Chapman (Voice) (English Dub)
- RoboCop: Alpha Commando (1998-1999) Various Voices
- Cybersix (1999) as Jose (Voice)
- Mugen no Rivaiasu (1999) as Charlie (Episode: Good Turtleland III) (Voice) (English Dub)
- Rainbow Fish (2000) (Credited as Alex Duduk) as Sherman Shrimp
- Zoids (2001) as Vega Obscura (Voice) (English Dub)
- X-Men: Evolution (2002) as Friendly Kid (Voice) (Episode: X-Treme Measures)
- MegaMan NT Warrior (2003) as Lan Hikari (Voice) (English Dub)
- Inuyasha (2001-2003) as Kohaku (Voice) (6 Episodes)
- Gadget and the Gadgetinis (2003) Additional Voices (7 Episodes)
- Kong: The Animated Series (2001-2005) as Young Jason (Voice) (2 Episodes)
