= Järna, Södertälje Municipality =

Järna
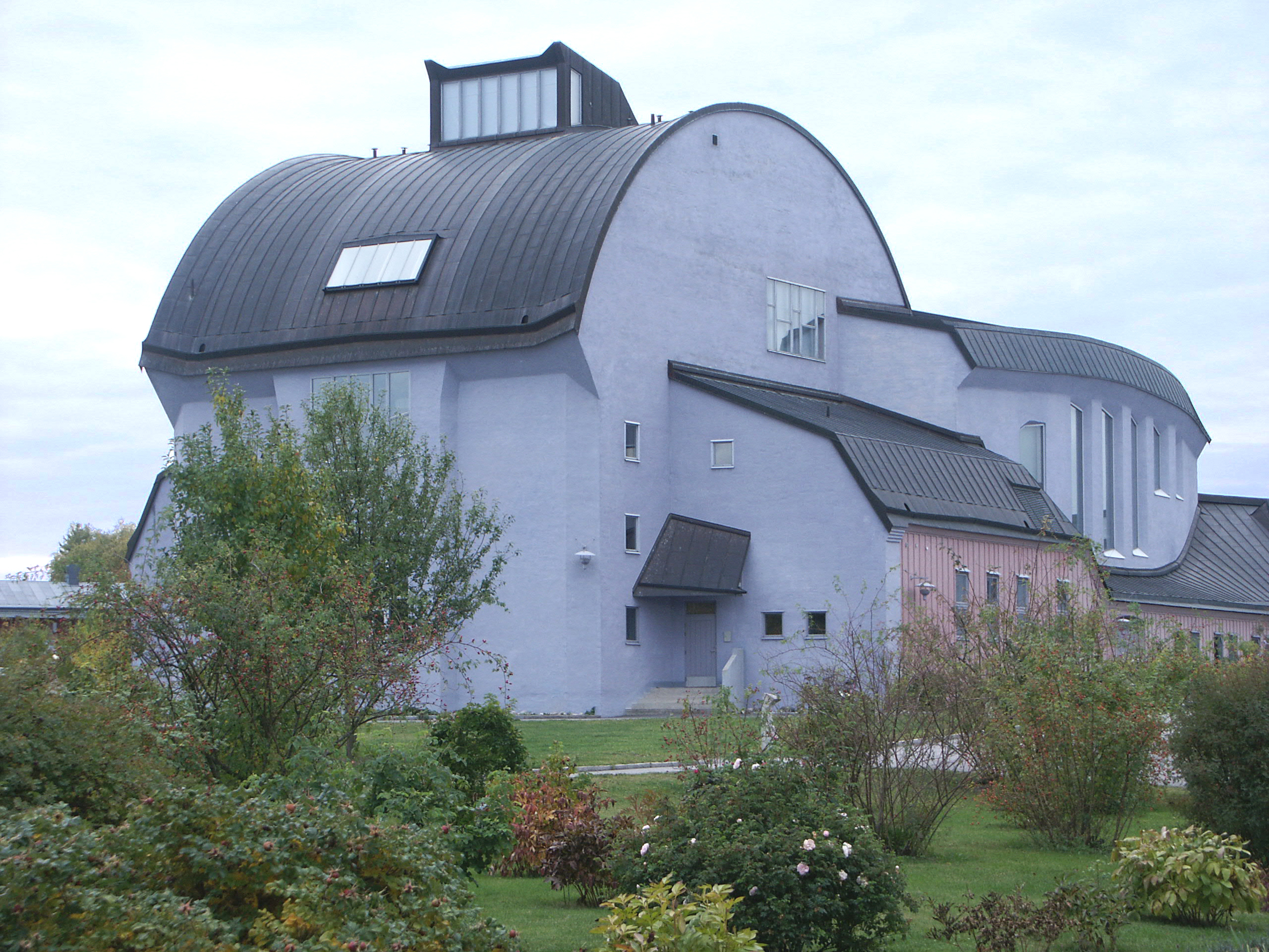
- Erik Asmussen's Cultural Centre in Ytterjärna. (Ytterjärna Kulturhus)

- Location within Stockholm Location within Sweden Location within European Union
- Coordinates: 59°05′N 17°34′E
- Country: Sweden
- Province: Södermanland
- County: Stockholm County
- Municipality: Södertälje Municipality

Area
  - Total: 3.93 km^{2} (1.52 sq mi)

Population (31 December 2020)
  - Total: 6,153
  - Density: 1,570/km^{2} (4,060/sq mi)
- Time zone: UTC+1 (CET)
  - Summer (DST): UTC+2 (CEST)

Järna is a locality situated in Södertälje Municipality, Stockholm County, Sweden with 6,377 inhabitants in 2010.

Järna has long been the centre of the anthroposophical movement in Sweden, and there is a private clinic, several schools and other institutions affiliated with the movement. A lot of the buildings, in the nearby village of Ytterjärna, are designed by the Danish-born anthroposophical architect Erik Asmussen (1913–1998), including the Cultural Centre in Ytterjärna, which in 2001 was voted the second best-liked modern building in Sweden.

Beata Bergström, photographer, resided here.

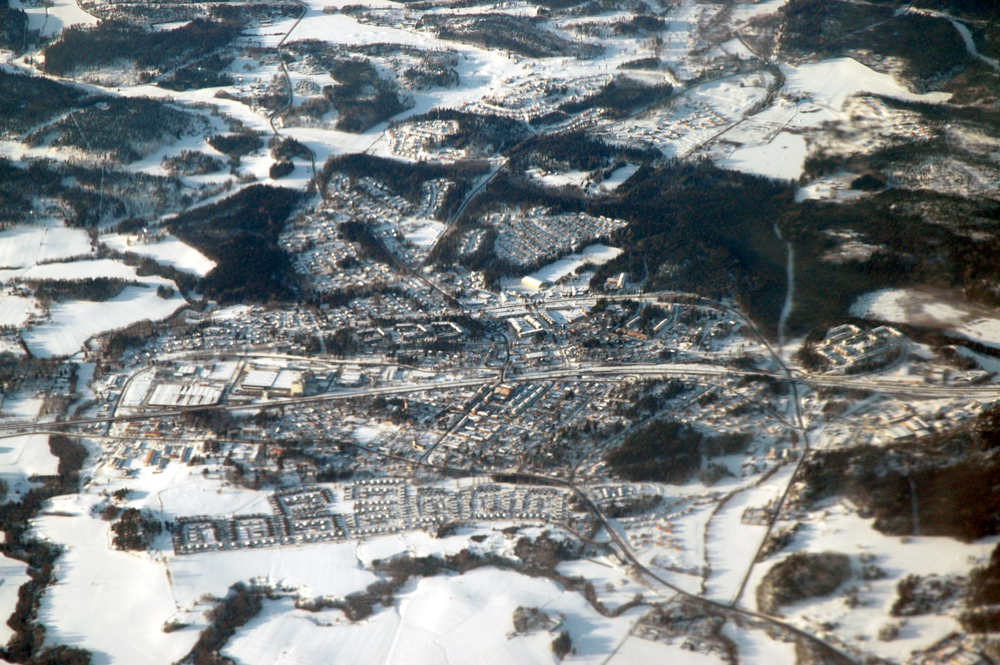
An aerial view of Järna – February 2007
