= Kong: The Animated Series =

Animated television series

- Genre: Action; Adventure; Science fiction; Fantasy; Animation
- Based on: King Kong by Merian C. Cooper; Edgar Wallace
- Developed by: Sean Catherine Derek; Romain Van Leimt
- Directed by: Marc Boreal
- Voices of: Kirby Morrow; Scott McNeil; Saffron Henderson; Daphne Goldrick; Kathy Morse; David Kaye; Paul Dobson; Pauline Newstone
- Countries of origin: United States; France; Germany
- Original languages: English; French; German
- No. of seasons: 2
- No. of episodes: 40

Production
- Executive producers: Allen Bohbot; Nadia Nardonnet; Robert Rea; Marie-Pierre Moulinjeune; Denis de Vallance
- Running time: 22 minutes
- Production companies: BKN International; Ellipsanime

Original release
- Network: M6; Fox Kids
- Release: May 26, 2001 – May 28, 2006

Kong: The Animated Series is an animated television series that follows King Kong, the title character based on the 1933 film of the same name. The series was a co-production between BKN International, Ellipsanime, and M6, and premiered in France on the latter network on May 2, 2001.

Kong: The Animated Series was the first show produced by BKN to not air in syndication.

== Plot ==
When King Kong fell to his death from the Empire State Building upon being shot down by biplanes in 1933, (Note: As depicted in King Kong (1933)) scientist Lorna Jenkins took DNA samples from him, which she used to recreate a clone counterpart of the original Kong with the help of the DNA of her grandson, Jason. Many years later, Jenkins sends an e-mail to her grandson where he and his friend, Eric "Tan" Tannenbaum IV, are invited to Kong's home on Kong Island. What they didn't know is that their university professor, Ramone De La Porta, had tampered with the e-mail, so he got invited as well. Upon meeting the native girl Lua, the group is taken to Jenkin's lab, where Ramone's true colors are shown. Upon getting access to the Cyber-Link technology, Ramone uses it to steal some of the Primal Stones in a plot to take over the world. The Primal Stones were used to keep the fire demon named Chiros in his prison. With the help of his Cyber-Link that can merge him with Kong, Jason and his friends must work to reclaim the Primal Stones from De La Porta and his followers while fighting off the forces of Chiros.

== Characters ==
=== Main ===
- Kong (vocal effects provided by Scott McNeil) is a genetically engineered clone of the original King Kong created by Lorna Jenkins by using the DNA of the deceased original Kong and from her grandson's DNA. Because of that, he has a younger brother relationship with Jason, signified by Jason calling Kong "Bro". He is known as the Protector, using his strength and the Primal Stones to protect the world from the demon Chiros. Through the use of the Cyber-Link, Jason can fuse with Kong and grow to twice his size. Both have strong wills so Kong can only stay in Jason, or vice versa, for a short period of time before causing each other harm.
- Jason Jenkins (voiced by Kirby Morrow as an adult, Alex Doduk as a young boy) is the orphaned grandson of Dr. Lorna Jenkins and is an "older brother" to Kong. With his DNA, Lorna was able to clone Kong after the original one died from falling to his death from the Empire State Building upon being taken down by planes. Jason is an archeology major at a university and best friend to classmate Tann. After being tricked by De La Porta and losing the Primal Stones, Jason, along with Tann, Lua and Kong searches for them all over the world while thwarting De La Porta's attempts of activating them for evil purposes. Jason primarily uses the Cyber-Link to fuse with Kong, but has occasionally fused with other animals as well. It is obvious Jason has feelings for Lua. In the final episode, Lua and Jason confess their feelings for each other and nearly kiss, but Kong splashes them before they can.
- Eric "Tann" Tannenbaum IV (voiced by Scott McNeil) is Jason's best friend and a fellow college student. Though he is very muscular, he is a kind person who will go out of the way to help his friends. Tann also takes martial arts and trains with Jason, but is not as good as Jason as he was not accepted into a martial arts tournament. His parents are very wealthy and he always likes to buy new gadgets which often become very useful later on. With the trust fund his grandfather left him, Tann is wealthier than his parents. He is an accomplished pilot, always seen flying a plane (or any other vehicle).
- Lua (voiced by Saffron Henderson) is a female native who serves as the shaman of Kong Island and the last of her people. She knows many secrets on Kong Island and helps Dr. Jenkins with her research as she knows Dr. Jenkins only wishes to help. Lua takes her position very seriously even though she is only at the beginning level, keeping the Island secrets from the group and several times risking her life. She also has a pet Smilodon named Chondar. Because she has lived on the island her entire life, Lua is quite naive about the outside world. It is obvious she has feelings for Jason as she always gets jealous when the mention of a past female friend of his comes up or another woman shows interest in him. In the final episode, Lua and Jason confess their feelings for each other and nearly kiss, but Kong splashes them with water before they can.
- Dr. Lorna Jenkins (voiced by Daphne Goldrick in earlier episodes, Kathy Morse in later episodes) is a scientist who is Jason's grandmother and the one who cloned Kong from the DNA of King Kong. She is in the midst of researching the different species on Kong Island as well as the Primal Stones when De La Porta steals them in the first episode. During the missions, Dr. Jenkins stays back on the island giving information from her research lab in a hidden cave. She is able to help the team with her vast amount of friends in the archeological world to get the information they need. Lorna is seen to be very attractive to her male friends as they often flirt with her when they chat.

=== Villains ===
- Professor Ramon De La Porta (voiced by David Kaye) is one of the main antagonists of the series. Porta is a man (apparently of Hispanic origin) who tried to steal the research of Lorna Jenkins alongside his men years ago. However, an encounter with Jason and Kong resulted in him accidentally getting his hand badly burned by hot chemicals when trying to reach for his gun. While he and his two henchmen managed to escape, Porta had lost his right hand and was forced to use a prosthesis. Twenty years later, Porta got a job as a professor at the university Jason and Tann attend, concealing his robotic hand with a pair of work gloves. When Lorna Jenkins sends an e-mail to her grandson, Porta hacks it so that it appears as if he'd been invited as well. Once on Kong Island, Porta reveals himself to Jenkins and steals one of the Cyber-Links to merge with Lua's pet Smilodon, Chondar, whom Kong manages to fend off and eventually forces Porta to flee. However, Porta succeeds in kidnapping Jenkins and forcing her to lead him to the location of the Primal Stones. Porta uses the Primal Stones for his own purposes in different locations, even modifying the Cyber-Links he stole to merge with anything that resembles an animal or combining himself with two animals at once. In the final episode, his life force is sucked out by Harpy as part of the ritual to free Chiros. While it is returned to him once Chiros is reimprisoned, his life force is nonetheless broken by the ritual and he is later hospitalized.
  - Omar (voiced by Scott McNeil) is a tall Black man and De La Porta's second-in-command.
  - Frazetti (voiced by Kirby Morrow) is a muscular Italian-American man with a blonde, cowlick hairstyle who works for De La Porta.
  - Giggles is a large, fat, unnamed man that works for De La Porta who earned his nickname from the fact he often giggles.
  - Tiger Lucy (voiced by Nicole Oliver) is an art dealer who once helped Tann's parents and seemed to have grown a crush on Tann, but later teams up with De La Porta and is complicit in many of his schemes, not caring what he wants to do as long as she gets paid. She primarily uses the Cyber-Link given to her by Roman to merge with her cat.
  - Rajeev is a one-time henchman of De La Porta who appeared in "Top of the World". He is of Indian descent and assisted Ramon in obtaining an ancient parchment from a Himalayan Monastery alongside hie allies. Rajeev uses the Cyber-Link that De La Porta gave him to merge with a giant Yeti that Kong befriended, though Kong manages to defeat Rajeev by freeing the Yeti from his control. Rajeev is arrested offscreen.
  - Wu-Chan (voiced by Scott McNeil) is a Chinese man and a one-time henchman of De La Porta who appears in "Curse of the Dragon". He aids De La Porta in kidnapping Jason and Lua in China when the former was invited to compete in a karate tournament. Wu-Chan and De La Porta force Jason into going into the Tomb of China's First Emperor near the Great Wall of China to retrieve a parchment that will reveal the secrets of the Primal Stone of Life and Death in exchange for Lua's safety. After the parchment is destroyed, Wu-Chan escapes with De La Porta.
  - Xepetotep is an Indian descendant of the Azteques along with his people. He is another one-time henchman of De La Porta, appeared in Quetzalcoatl. He works for Ramon because he promises him gold. During the fight between Ramon and Jason, he flees in the tunnels but he is finally arrested by his people whereas he tried to escape.
- Chiros (voiced by Paul Dobson) is a shaman who sought more power and tried to steal the Primal Stones, ultimately transforming into an ancient demon. He was sealed away by the original Kong and his shaman companion. After De La Porta steals some of the Primal Stones, Chiros is slowly released from his imprisonment. In the final episode, Chiros is freed and fights Kong himself, but is eventually defeated when Lua casts a spell and Kong throws him into the portal while re-imprisoning him.
  - Harpy (voiced by Pauline Newstone) is a gargoyle-like demon and Chiros' second-in-command. Unlike the rest of Chiros's gargoyle army, she appears more human and is able to think for herself, though she's completely devoted to Chrios' cause. In the final episode, Harpy is turned to stone after being thrown by Tann into the spell Lua recites.
  - Ominous is a demon who serves Chiros. He is the Chiros' most powerful warrior and is even able to match the likes of Kong in terms of strength. He is killed in the finale when Kong traps him in the moving sands.
- Rakhir (voiced by Ted Cole) is a poacher of Arab descent who travels to Africa to hunt gorillas. He and his men then capture Kong and Lua before Jason and Tann defeat him and arrest him then free their friends with the help of other jungle animals.
- Howling Jack Crockett (voiced by Richard Newman) is a film director and stuntman who'd disappeared from the public after some legal trouble involving some of his film stunts, making him a subject of a news program's "Where are they now" segment. He resurfaced some time later when he sees Kong and pilots a giant robot during Kong's fight with De La Porta and Omar. In the episode "DNA Land", Crockett captures Kong and Giggles for his new animal park. This plan is thwarted by Jason, who rescues Kong. In the episode "Interview with a Monkey", De La Porta arranges for footage to be given to Crockett for the special, but was ultimately thwarted by Kong. Taking pity on him, Kong offers Howling Jack a compromise, leading to the release of Crockett's latest film: Kong vs. the One-Eyed Critter from Saturn.
  - Giles is Crockett's butler.
- Andre (voiced by Ron Halder) is a firearms dealer who sells weapons to terrorists.

=== Other characters ===
- Chondar - Lua's Smilodon companion. In Kong: Return to the Jungle, Chondar is revealed to be female and has become the mother to a cub called Kipling (named for Rudyard Kipling).
- Soara - Lua's Pteranodon companion.

== Episodes ==
=== Series overview ===
Season	Episodes	Originally released	
Season	Episodes	First released	Last released
1	20	May 26, 2001	December 11, 2005
2	20	December 14, 2005	May 28, 2006

=== Season 1 (2001–2005) ===
No. overall	No. in season	Title	Directed by	Written by	Original release date	Prod. code
1	1	"The Return: Part 1"	Marc Boréal & Stéphane Roux	Sean Catherine Derek & Romain van Liemt	May 26, 2001	#101
18-year-old Jason and his best friend Tann journey to the mysterious Kong Island hidden in the heart of the Bermuda Triangle where many mysteries await them, but the biggest one will change their lives forever.
2	2	"The Return: Part 2"	Chuck Patton, Joe Pearson & Stéphane Roux	Sean Catherine Derek, Larry DiTillio & Romain van Liemt	June 2, 2001	#102
The evil Professor Ramon De La Porta arrives and aims to take the mystic Primal Stones, and Jason and Kong must find a way to defeat him.
3	3	"Primal Power"	Marc Boréal & Stéphane Roux	Richard Mueller & Romain van Liemt	June 9, 2001	#103
De La Porta succeeds in taking the Primal Stones, and now only Kong can stop him and restore peace to the island.
4	4	"Dragon Fire"	Marc Boréal & Stéphane Roux	Richard Mueller & Romain van Liemt	June 16, 2001	#106
A "sea monster" is stealing hi-tech weapons. Jason and his friends suspect that it's De La Porta using the Cyber-Link. While investigating, they uncover De La Porta's connection with Andre, a notorious underworld arms dealer. De La Porta attempts to double-cross Andre, but is taken prisoner in Andre's hideout in an offshore oil rig. Jason, Tann, Lua, and Kong attempt to free De La Porta and keep the Cyber-Link from falling into Andre's hands as De La Porta tricks him into merging with a Komodo dragon that Giggles previously merged with.
5	5	"Billy"	Marc Boréal & Stéphane Roux	Stéphane Piera	June 23, 2001	#116
On the deserted Manhattan docks, a young boy named Billy witnesses a titanic battle between Kong and Omar who merged with a rat. After the battle, Billy finds one of the Cyber-links. He uses it to merge with a cat, but the link was damaged and the merger creates a giant, formless, creature.
6	6	"Cobra God"	Chuck Patton, Joe Pearson & Stéphane Roux	Savin Yeatman-Eiffel	July 7, 2001	#126
Jason, Tann, and Lua are attending an exclusive auction of relics in N.Y. City. Tann outbids the evil Professor Ramon De La Porta for an ancient Atlantean stone tablet, paying ten million dollars. Afterwards Ramon's henchmen attack them as Omar merges with a stray dog. Jason merges with Kong to beat back the creature, but in the battle the stone tablet is broken. De La Porta takes the biggest piece and races off to India with the group hot in pursuit. They catch up with him in the legendary lost Palace of the Maharajah high in the mountains. Using the stone tablet and the Primal Stone of Fire, the Professor opens a Portal allowing the titanic Fire Cobra to arrive. Without the full tablet, De La Porta cannot control the monstrous creature and the out-of-control Cobra threatens to burn the world to ashes. Kong valiantly battles the monster allowing the group to destroy the Stone of Fire Portal and causing the Fire Cobra to vanish.
7	7	"The Giant Claw Robberies"	Chuck Patton, Joe Pearson & Stéphane Roux	John Semper & Romain van Liemt	July 14, 2001	#105
Jason, Tann, Lua, and Kong travel to New York City in an attempt to stop a series of robberies of ancient tablets connected to the Primal Stones. They discover that De La Porta is behind the thefts and is trying to learn how to unlock the power of the Stones. Kong and Jason are forced to battle two monstrous Cyber-Link creatures, BadKat and Slothbear, in order to stop De La Porta.
8	8	"Top of the World"	Marc Boréal & Stéphane Roux	Edouard Blanchot & Philippe Valériola	July 21, 2001	#114
Jason and company discover that De La Porta is on his way to an isolated Himalayan monastery to seize an ancient parchment revealing the use of the Primal Stones. De La Porta and his henchmen attack the monastery, which is defended by a yeti.
9	9	"Curse of the Dragon"	Marc Boréal & Stéphane Roux	Francis Nief	July 28, 2001	#121
Jason is really excited when he receives an invitation to a karate exhibition in the Chinese city of Xi An. Tann was not invited and now plans to give up karate. Jason and Lua fly to China, where they are kidnapped by Ramon De La Porta and taken to an area near the Great Wall. Buried in the nearby tomb of the first Emperor of China is a parchment that will reveal the secret of the Primal Stone of Life and Death. De La Porta threatens Lua, forcing Jason to enter the deadly tomb maze to recover the parchment. Tann merges with Kong and flies to his buddy's rescue. Together, Tann and Kong rescue Jason and retrieve the parchment from the booby trap-filled maze. Kong battles with a Cyber-Link-created Chinese Dragon while Jason and Tann defeat the Professor and rescue Lua. Jason wins the karate tournament and Tann is proud of his bud.
10	10	"Reborn"	Randy Littlejohn & Christy Marx	Paul Dobson, Daphne Goldrick & Saffron Henderson	August 4, 2001	#108
Kong, Jason, Tann and Lua investigate a temple in the Atlantean ruins of Shama-Ra on Kong Island. Tann and Lua are possessed by the ancient spirits of the Atlantean King and Queen. They take the Primal Stone of Lightning from Kong's Lair and use it in an attempt to destroy their old enemy Chiros. A massive battle takes place with Jason, Kong, and the Atlanteans fighting against Harpy, Ominous, and an army of Apbats. The minions of Chiros are defeated, but the temple is destroyed. Tann and Lua are released by the King and Queen who rejoin their ancestors.
11	11	"Indian Summer"	Marc Boréal & Stéphane Roux	Jean-Christophe Derrien	August 11, 2001	#118
Tiger Lucy and Giggles break into a sacred Indian cave/temple hidden in the Ozark Mountains and steal a mystical totem for De La Porta. The Professor attempts to use the totem to control the Earth Stone, but his N.Y. headquarters is attacked by vicious swarms of locusts.
12	12	"Blue Star"	Marc Boréal & Stéphane Roux	Edouard Blanchot & Philippe Valériola	August 18, 2001	#122
A meteorite glowing with blue energy approaches Earth. Dr. Jenkins deduces that it will collide with the Earth and is attracted by the power of the Primal Stones. Guided by Lua's visions, Jason, Tann, Lua and Kong journey to the lost city of Ultima Thule in the icy wastes of Greenland. En route, they rescue a pod of humpback whales from a gang of poachers under the command of the terrorist Andre. The group finds the lost city hidden beneath the ice pack. In its center is a giant Blue Crystal. Andre attacks using Jason's stolen Cyber-Link on a polar bear. Kong defeats the monster in a battle. Lua uses the Blue Crystal and the powers of the whales to activate the Primal Stones, sending a powerful beam of energy up to deflect the meteorite and save the Earth.
13	13	"Dangerous Melody"	Marc Boréal	Marc Chomont	August 25, 2001	#128
The group tracks De La Porta to the jungles of Burma and the fantastic Forgotten City. In a ruined temple, the Professor tries to activate the Primal Stone of Time. Jason, Tann, and Lua attempt to stop him but are transformed into children by the powers of the Primal Stone. They take the Stone and escape with Kong. The giant ape has his hands full dealing with the younger versions of his friends. De La Porta's henchmen attack, led by a horrible Cyber-link-created monstrosity Giggles/tarantula. Kong defeats the creature in a wild fight, but the children are recaptured along with the Stone. Kong attacks De La Porta and in the ensuing chaos, the Professor and his men are also turned into children. With some clever detective work, Jason and his friends figure out how to reverse the Stone's power and return everyone to their normal ages.
14	14	"Dark Forces Rising"	Marc Boréal & Stéphane Roux	Sean Catherine Derek & Romain Van Leimt	October 3, 2005	#104
The theft of the Primal Stones from Kong Island threatens to awaken the ancient demon Chiros. Lua journeys alone to Chiros' ruined temple in an attempt to imprison him. She is captured and brainwashed by Harpy.
15	15	"Mistress of the Game"	Marc Boréal & Stéphane Roux	Sean Catherine Derek & Jean-Christophe Derrien	October 24, 2005	#107
Jason, Kong, Tann, and Lua are forced down in Africa by engine trouble. Lua encounters an evil poacher named Rakhir who kidnaps her to use as bait for Kong. With his mercenary hunters, Rakhir ambushes and captures Kong. With the help of a baby gorilla whose father was captured by Rakhir, Jason and Tann defeat Rakhir and set Lua and Kong free. Jason merges with Kong, becoming Mega-Kong, and the hunters become the hunted.
16	16	"The Infinity Stone"	Marc Boréal & Stéphane Roux	Katherine Lawrence & Romain Van Liemt	November 7, 2005	#109
In England, De La Porta forces a Druid Priest named Dr. MacKay to agree to help him use ancient Druid ceremonies to unlock the powers of a Primal Stone. Kong and his friends travel to England to stop them. Merging with a wild boar, De La Porta dukes it out with Kong and forces a retreat. The battle resumes at Stonehenge where MacKay is unleashing the power of the Stone. Merging with Dr. MacKay's cat and a scorpion specimen to form a Manticore, De La Porta holds Kong at bay until the Stone opens up a vortex into Infinity. Kong is nearly sucked into the vortex, but Jason merges with him and becomes Mega-Kong, escaping the vortex and defeating De La Porta.
17	17	"Night of the Talons"	Marc Boréal & Stéphane Roux	Glenn Leopold & Romain Van Leimt	November 13, 2005	#110
De La Porta takes Tann's billionaire parents hostage in Paris with help from Omar merging with a lion and an eagle to form a Griffin, forcing Tann to agree to lead Lua into a trap. An unhappy and confused Tann sends Jason and Kong off on a false trail and takes Lua to a chateau outside Paris and into De La Porta's trap where they are captured by Omar and Frazetti. Jason shows up with Kong, surprising everybody. Kong battles Omar's Griffin form in a tremendous fight over the French countryside and Paris.
18	18	"Howling Jack"	Marc Boréal & Stéphane Roux	Len Wein & Romain Van Liemt	November 20, 2005	#111
Jason, Kong, Tann, and Lua travel to Los Angeles in an attempt to stop De La Porta from stealing a stone tablet on display at an L.A. museum that contains the secrets of the Primal Stones. Down-and-out director and stuntman Howling Jack Crockett spots Kong and becomes obsessed with getting footage of the giant ape.
19	19	"The Hidden Fears"	Marc Boréal & Stéphane Roux	Sean Catherine Derek & Romain Van Liemt	November 27, 2005	#112
Harpy takes Dr. Jenkins and Chon-Dar prisoner in an effort to find the Primal Stones. Jason, Tann, and Lua attempt to rescue them, but Harpy gasses Kong with giant spider venom knocking him unconscious. Lua merges with Kong's mind to try to bring him out of his coma.
20	20	"The Sleeping City"	Marc Boréal & Stéphane Roux	Larry DiTillio & Romain Van Liemt	December 11, 2005	#113
Kong and friends travel to Egypt to foil De La Porta's scheme to find the legendary Staff of Set, use it to activate a Primal Stone and resurrect Set, the ancient Egyptian God of Evil. Pursuing the Professor after Omar and Frazetti kidnap an archaeologist's daughter, Jason, Tann, Lua and Kong are forced to fight a giant Crocodile/Giggles Cyber-link-created monster on the way.

=== Season 2 (2005–2006) ===
No. overall	No. in season	Title	Directed by	Written by	Original release date	Prod. code
21	1	"Master of Souls"	Marc Boréal & Stéphane Roux	Eric Rondeaux	December 14, 2005	#115
An old friend of Tann's, Caroline Watson, has discovered the Primal Stone of the Soul and is being stalked by De La Porta and his men. Tann, Jason, Kong, and Lua fly to Guatemala to rescue her. In an ancient Mayan temple, the Professor captures Tann and Caroline and uses the Stone to seize control of their minds.
22	2	"Enlil's Wrath"	Marc Boréal & Stéphane Roux	Dominique Latil	December 14, 2005	#117
An old friend of Tann's, Caroline Watson, has discovered the Primal Stone of the Soul and is being stalked by De La Porta and his men. Tann, Jason, Kong, and Lua fly to Guatemala to rescue her. In an ancient Mayan temple, the Professor captures Tann and Caroline and uses the Stone to seize control of their minds.
23	3	"Welcome to Ramone's"	Marc Boréal & Stéphane Roux	Edouard Blanchot and Philippe Valeriola	December 14, 2005	#119
Ramon De La Porta makes a peace offer to Jason, inviting him to meet with him at an opening at his museum/headquarters in N.Y.. Jason cautiously accepts, but Tann and Lua come in disguise to provide backup with Kong. De La Porta wants Jason to join him in gaining all the Primal Stones to dominate the world together. Kong soon ends up fighting a robotic Minotaur with a centaur-like build made from Cyber-Link technology.
24	4	"DNA Land"	Marc Boréal & Stéphane Roux	Jean-Christophe Derrien	December 14, 2005	#120
Jason, Tann, Lua and Kong attempt to trap Professor De La Porta, but the trap turns into a running battle. While the group is distracted, Howling Jack stuns and captures Kong and Giggles (who merged with an eagle) with a powerful laser. He imprisons the giant ape in his DNA Land, a zoo-style compound for rare species. Kong begins working with the other captured animals to escape.
25	5	"Renewal"	Chuck Patton, Joe Pearson & Stéphane Roux	Jean-Christophe Derrien	January 22, 2006	#123
Dr. Jenkins, Jason and Tann host a surprise 15th birthday party for Kong complete with a giant birthday cake. That night, Lua leads Kong out into the jungle where she uses a Primal Stone to open a Portal into another dimension and takes Kong and herself into a parallel world version of Kong Island. Jason and Tann follow. Kong is forced by the other world's Shaman/Judge to undergo a series of tests to see if he is worthy to be the Protector of Kong Island. Kong encounters Ominous and an evil version of himself that attempt to enrage him and divert him from his quest. When his friends are threatened by a titanic tidal wave, Kong abandons his test to rescue them. The Shaman announces that Kong is worthy and returns them all to their own Kong Island.
26	6	"Chiros' Child"	Marc Boréal & Stéphane Roux	Stephane Piera	January 29, 2006	#124
Lua falls into a trap set by the demon Chiros and falls into a fissure deep into the earth. A mysterious young girl treats Lua's wounds and leads her to a cavern containing the secret Chamber of the Thirteen Shamans. Lua is attacked by Apbats, but is saved by the Shamanic powers of the girl. Reading the Chamber's ancient hieroglyphics, Lua becomes convinced that the young girl is Zara, the Child Shaman of Lua's ancestors. They are attacked by Chiros' lava men, but rescued by the arrival of Jason, Tann, and Kong. Escaping to the surface, Lua is determined to show Zara all the secrets of the Island Shamans. Lua is about to give her the Primal Lightning Stone, when Zara's disguise is pierced revealing herself to be Chiros' chief servant Harpy. Harpy uses the Stone's powers to batter Kong, but is defeated by Lua's Shaman powers.
27	7	"The Aquanauts"	Chuck Patton, Joe Pearson & Stéphane Roux	Jean-David Morvan	February 5, 2006	#125
Professor Ramon De La Porta travels to Loch Ness, Scotland and its sunken Atlantean ruins which hold the Primal Water Stone. Dr. Jenkins, Jason, Tann, Lua and Kong arrive to stop him. Ramon merges with the Loch Ness monster and attacks. Jason merges with Kong to fight the newly-created Cyber-monster, but Ramon/Nessie beats Kong unconscious. Underwater dwellers known as the Aquanauts rescue Kong/Jason and take them to their underwater Atlantean city and the Temple of Kong. Dr. Jenkins, Lua, and Tann arrive and join them in Tann's mini sub. The Aquanaut Queen falls in love with Jason. Ramon/Nessie attacks, aided by an army of Ramon's mini subs firing advanced weapons. Working together, the group and the valiant Aquanauts defeat Ramon and his minions, setting Nessie free. The Queen throws a big party. Kong and Nessie play.
28	8	"Windigo"	Marc Boréal & Stéphane Roux	Olivier Sicard	February 19, 2006	#127
De La Porta and his men travel by helicopter to an isolated Native Canadian village. They take the villagers hostage, forcing the tribe's Shaman Big Bear to take Ramon to the Natives' ancient Stone Circle. Using the Cosmic Primal Stone, the mad Professor raises the legendary Windigo.
29	9	"Green Fear"	Marc Boréal & Stéphane Roux	Claude Sacasso	March 5, 2006	#129
Jason, Tann, Lua, and Kong travel to the deep jungles of Central Africa to seek out the Gwake tribe. These isolated pygmies hold one of the secrets of the Primal Stones. While rescuing a Gwake child from a hungry black panther, Jason discovers a hollow tree filled with ancient hieroglyphics. The group is captured by the pygmies and brought before Ramon De La Porta, who has convinced the Gwake that he is the Protector. He drugs Jason and seizes control of his mind. After his plot is thwarted, De La Porta merges with a cockatoo and gets away.
30	10	"Twilight of the Gods"	Marc Boréal & Stéphane Roux	Philippe Daniau & Francois Gaschet	March 12, 2006	#130
A terrible electric storm rakes Kong Island activating the Primal Stones and creating a vortex that sends the group's seaplane onto an island in a different time and space. In the island's dense forests, ferocious Vikings attack them. After a brutal fight, Kong is lured into a deep pit. Jason, Tann, and Lua are captured and taken to the Viking village. Kong encounters an Ice Giant in the caverns.
31	11	"Framed"	Marc Boréal & Stéphane Roux	Dominique Latil	March 19, 2006	#131
Tiger Lucy and Omar raid a government arsenal and frame Jason and Tann for the crime. As Jason and Tann are arrested by the FBI agents, it's up to Lua and Kong to prove their innocence.
32	12	"The Invisible Threat"	Marc Boréal & Stéphane Roux	Francis Nief	March 26, 2006	#132
An invisible man lands on Kong Island and steals the Primal Stone of Antimatter. Jason and his friends trace the invisible man to the South American jungle where the tribe is fooled by De La Porta to give him the secret to their invisibility gem. Once that was done, De La Porta becomes invisible and merges with a spider monkey to fight Kong.
33	13	"Sir James Alex's Legacy"	Chuck Patton, Joe Pearson & Stéphane Roux	Stephane Piera	April 2, 2006	#133
Two giant mutant coyotes terrorizes a small village in central Mexico. Jason and his friends to Mexico where they find that Omar and Giggles are behind it as they have merged with the two coyotes.
34	14	"Lies"	Marc Boréal & Stéphane Roux	Annabelle Perrichon	April 9, 2006	#134
De La Porta impersonates Jason and dupes Lua into revealing the whereabouts of the Primal Stones.
35	15	"Return to the Redwoods"	Marc Boréal & Stéphane Roux	Eric Rondeaux	April 23, 2006	#135
De La Porta travels back in time to prevent Dr. Jenkins from completing the experiment that created Kong.
36	16	"Sacred Songs"	Marc Boréal	Joel Bassaget & Olivier Vannalle	April 20, 2006	#136
De La Porta's henchmen use radar dishes to drive animals wild in the Australian outback.
37	17	"Apocalypse"	Marc Boréal	Annabelle Perrichon	May 7, 2006	#137
With De La Porta in Harpy's possession, Jason, Lua, and Kong search for the last Primal Stone to prevent it from falling into enemy hands.
38	18	"Quetzalcoatl"	Marc Boréal	Olivier Sicard	May 14, 2006	#138
In Central Mexico, De La Porta is mining gold with the help from machinery, Quetzalcoatl, and the captive natives. Because of a device on De La Porta's arm, Jason can't undo the reverse-merge on Kong as it is discovered that the Quetzalcoatl helping De La Porta is actually Frazetti who has merged with a quetzal and a rattlesnake. Once De La Porta's device is destroyed, Kong faces off against Quetzalcoatl.
39	19	"The 13th Stone"	Marc Boréal	Eric Rondeaux	May 21, 2006	#139
Jason and his friends travel 6,000 years into the past to the lost continent of Atlantis.
40	20	"Interview With a Monkey"	Marc Boréal	Jean-Christophe Derrien	May 28, 2006	#140
Jason and his friends race to Los Angeles to prevent Howling Jack from revealing the truth about Kong as De La Porta plans to give the footage of Kong to him.

== Cast ==
- Paul Dobson as Chiros, Doctor (in "Billy")
- Daphne Goldrick as Dr. Lorna Jenkins (earlier episodes)
- Saffron Henderson as Lua
- David Kaye as Ramon De La Porta, News Anchor (in "The Giant Claws Robberies"), Lex (in "Dragon Fire").
- Scott McNeil as Kong, Eric "Tan" Tannenbaum IV, Omar, Naval Captain (in" Dragon Fire"), Silverback (in "Mistress Of The Game"), Wu-Chan (in "Curse of the Great Dragon")
- Kathy Morse as Dr. Lorna Jenkins (later episodes)
- Kirby Morrow as Jason Jenkins, Frazetti
- Pauline Newstone as Harpy

=== Additional ===
- Ted Cole as Rakhir (in "Mistress of the Game")
- Alex Doduk as Young Jason Jenkins (in "The Return" Pt. 1)
- Ron Halder as Andre
- Phil Hayes
- Ellen Kennedy as Billy's Mom (in "Billy")
- Richard Newman as Howling Jack Crockett, Giles (in "DNA Land")
- Nicole Oliver as Tiger Lucy
- Venus Terzo as Amina (in "The Sleeping City")
- Dale Wilson as Dr. Nagire (in "Top of the World")

== Movies ==
=== Kong: King of Atlantis (2005) ===
In 2005, BKN produced a film called Kong: King of Atlantis, which served as a continuation to the series in order to try and cash in on the 2005 King Kong remake. The film centres on Kong trying to protect the titular mythic island from a tyrannical human/snake hybridous queen Reptilla who plans on making Kong as ruler of Atlantis.

It's the 8th entry in the King Kong franchise.

The film was released on DVD in most regions by Warner Home Video.

=== Kong: Return to the Jungle (2006) ===
A stand-alone sequel, titled Kong: Return to the Jungle was produced in 2006, and was computer-animated, unlike the first film and the series. In the film, hunters capture Kong and other animals from his island for a special zoo.

The film was released on DVD by Genius Entertainment in the United States, Morningstar Entertainment in Canada, and BKN Home Entertainment in the United Kingdom.

It's the 10th entry in the King Kong franchise.

== Development ==
The series first began production in 1999, simply called Kong, being deemed as a "futuristic" version of the character.

== Broadcast ==
On April 4, 2001, the series was pre-sold in the US to air on Fox's Fox Kids block. The show later premiered on May 26 of that year, and was also confirmed that the series had been pre-sold to M6 in France as well. Fox Kids aired half of the series before taking it off air.

In March 2005, Super RTL acquired the German broadcast rights to the Kong: King of Atlantis movie.

In July 2005, Disney Channels Worldwide purchased the US cable rights to the series alongside Kong: King of Atlantis to air on Toon Disney's Jetix block in anticipation of the release of Peter Jackson's King Kong remake. The series began on Jetix on September 9 and aired the rest of the episodes that Fox didn't. The film aired on November 1 of that year.

In October 2005, Turner Broadcasting System Europe acquired the UK broadcast rights to the series to air on Toonami. Kong: King of Atlantis was also acquired for a November airing on the channel alongside Cartoon Network.

== Other media ==
=== Home media ===
==== United States ====
On March 20, 2007, Genius Entertainment released two two-disc volumes which make up the whole series. A boxset containing both volumes and the Kong: Return to the Jungle movie was later released.

=== Video games ===
Two video games were released based on the series, both on the Nintendo Game Boy Advance. The first, called simply Kong: The Animated Series, was released by Planet Interactive in 2002. The second was released by Majesco in 2005, and was based on the direct-to-video film Kong: King of Atlantis.
