= Filosofisk Tidskrift =

- Discipline: Philosophy
- Language: Swedish
- Edited by: Lars Bergström

Publication details
- History: 1980–present
- Publisher: Bokförlaget Thales (Sweden)
- Frequency: Quarterly

Standard abbreviations
- ISO 4: Filos. Tidskr.

Indexing
- ISSN: 0348-7482
- OCLC no.: 476444577

Links
- Journal homepage

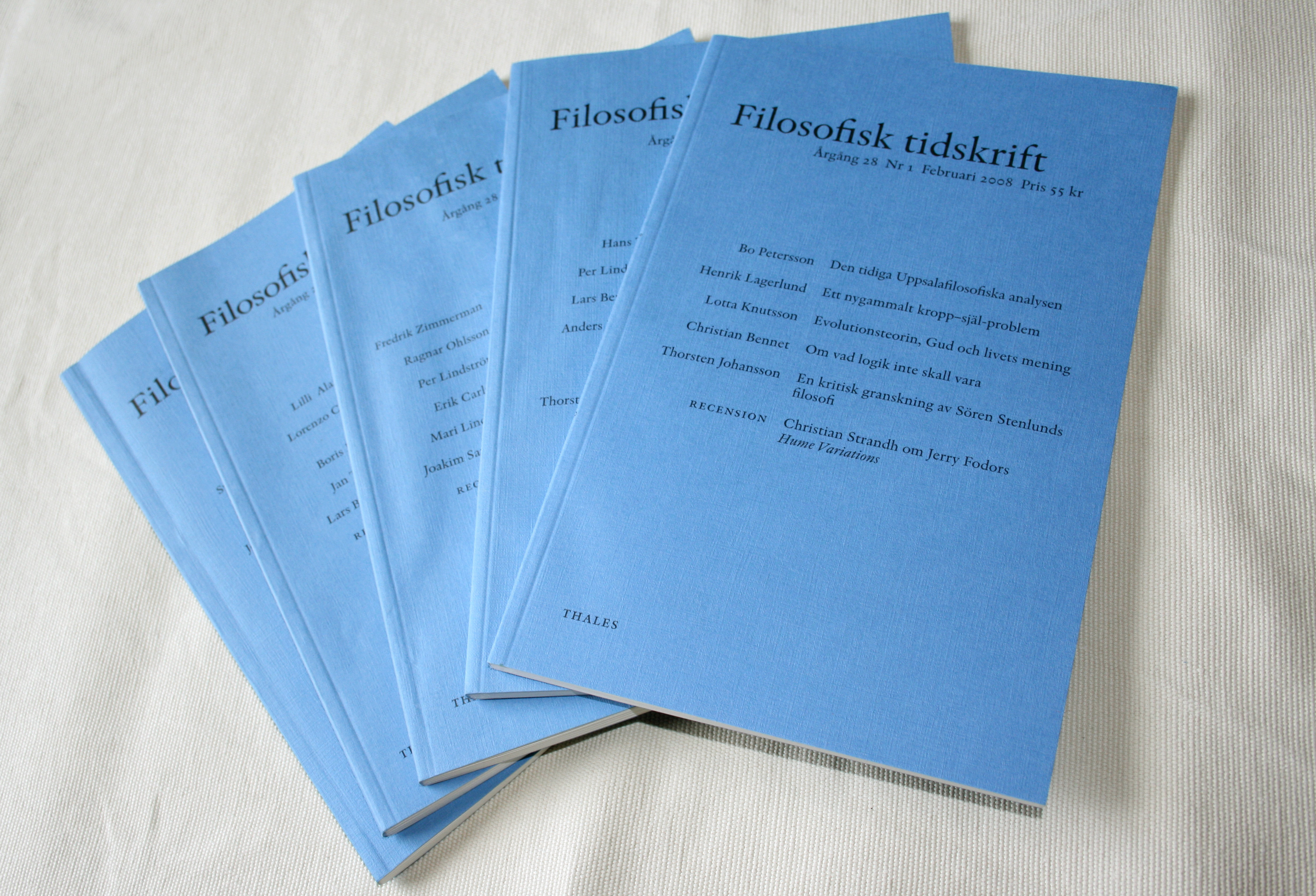

Filosofisk Tidskrift is a quarterly Swedish-language academic journal covering all areas of philosophy while avoiding contributions that require special technical prerequisites. It was established in 1980 and the editor-in-chief is Lars Bergström (Stockholm University).

== Abstracting and indexing ==
PhilPapers has abstracted 98 papers that appeared in the journal between 1980 and 2015.

== See also ==
- List of philosophy journals
