= The Impossible Elephant =

2001 film directed by Martin Wood

- Theatrical release poster
- Directed by: Martin Wood
- Written by: Robert C. Cooper
- Produced by: Leanne Arnott
- Cinematography: Michael Storey
- Edited by: Brad Rines
- Music by: Michael Richard Plowman
- Production company: Edge Entertainment
- Distributed by: Peace Arch Entertainment
- Release date: April 20, 2001 (Canada)
- Running time: 95 minutes
- Country: Canada
- Language: English

The Impossible Elephant is a 2001 Canadian adventure comedy film directed by Martin Wood and written by Robert C. Cooper. The film premiered at the Sprockets Toronto International Film Festival for Children on April 20, 2001 and was later released on home media by the distributor Peace Arch Entertainment.

== Synopsis ==
A boy named Daniel, whose mother has recently died, wishes upon a star for an elephant. His wish comes true when one appears in his clubhouse, much to the disapproval of his father. When they bring it to a zoo, they find out that the elephant is sick and will be shipped to San Diego to be taken care of. When attempting to help his adopted pet escape, with the help of his friend Gilbert, they realize the elephant possesses the ability to fly.

== Cast ==
- Mark Rendall as Daniel Harris
- Alex Doduk as Gilbert (Trout)
- Nicholas Lea as Steven Harris
- Mia Sara as Molly Connor
- Jordan Becker as "Butterbutt"
- Dwayne Brenna as Principal Duncan
- Sheldon Bergstrom as Jack

== Production ==
The production design was done by Kathleen Climie, and the movie was filmed in Saskatoon, Saskatchewan. The soundtrack was created by Michael Richard Plowman.

== Reception ==
Ken Eisner of Variety called the film a "more-than-serviceable kidpic that makes good use of real and mechanical pachyderms to whip up a boy's-own tale of a magical Dumbo loose in the ‘burbs."

=== Awards ===
The film won the Best Feature Film award at the Toronto Sprockets International Film Festival for Children in 2001, while director Wood and screenwriter Cooper were nominated at the Gemini Awards for "Best Direction in a Children's or Youth Program or Series" and "Best Writing in a Children's or Youth Program or Series" respectively.
