= Elmo Shropshire =

American singer (born 1936)

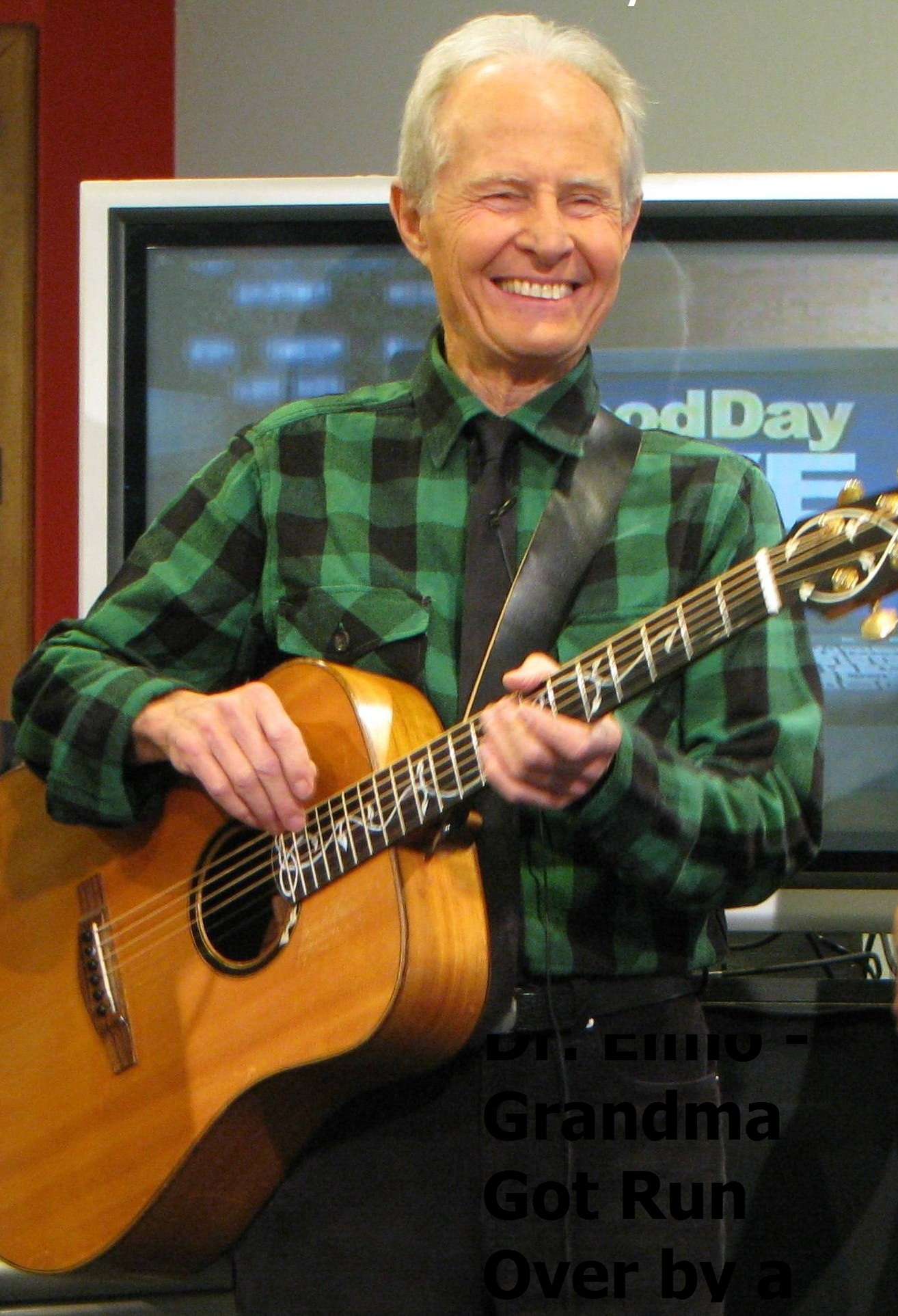
- Shropshire performing in New York in 2009

Background information
- Also known as: Dr. Elmo
- Born: October 26, 1936 (age 90); Richmond, Virginia, U.S.
- Genres: Christmas music, bluegrass
- Occupations: Musician, veterinarian
- Instruments: Vocals, 5-string banjo, guitar
- Years active: 1970–present
- Labels: Epic, SonyBMG, Sony, Time Life
- Formerly of: Elmo & Patsy
- Spouses: Patsy Trigg (div. 1985): Pam Wendell
- Website: www.facebook.com/Dr.Elmo.Shropshire

Elmo Earl Shropshire (born October 26, 1936) is an American veterinarian, competitive runner, and country music singer. Shropshire, who typically performs under the name "Dr. Elmo", is best known for his Christmas novelty song "Grandma Got Run Over by a Reindeer". He originally recorded the song in 1979 with his then-wife Patsy, then re-recorded it solo for the 1992 album Dr. Elmo's Twisted Christmas and again in 2000 for the album Up Your Chimney. He also has recorded other songs, released on albums including Dr. Elmo's Twisted Tunes (1993) and Love, Death & Taxes (2000).

== Personal life ==
Elmo Shropshire is a native of Lexington, Kentucky and has a Bachelors of Science in agriculture from the University of Florida where he was a member of the Alpha Gamma Rho fraternity. He then earned a Doctor of Veterinary Medicine from Auburn University in Alabama. He was racetrack veterinarian at Aqueduct and Belmont Park in New York before moving to San Francisco to open his own hospital, Arguello Pet Hospital. In San Francisco, Shropshire began playing banjo in a bluegrass band, and later became a competitive runner.

== Success with "Grandma Got Run Over by a Reindeer" ==
In 1979, Shropshire recorded "Grandma Got Run Over by a Reindeer" (written by his friend Randy Brooks). At the time, he was part of a double act with his then-wife Patsy Trigg; though he effectively recorded the song as a solo record without Trigg's help, they released the record credited as a duet, which he stated was "another story." With the record's release, Elmo & Patsy became regional superstars. They divorced in 1985; Shropshire then married Pam Wendell, a saleswoman who had helped promote the record to retailers. Since then, Shropshire settled a class action suit against Sony based upon the royalties paid from downloads and ringtone sales.

In 2000, he served as co-writer of an animated Christmas special based on the song. For this television special, he also provided the voices of Grandpa and the narrator. In 2007, Shropshire was sued by the Fred Rappaport Company, the producer of the show, over the right to use the song in show-related merchandise.

In 2009, Shropshire appeared on "Good Morning America", and in 2010 he appeared on Late Night with Jimmy Fallon.

On December 23, 2014, Shropshire performed "Grandma Got Run Over by a Reindeer" on The Meredith Vieira Show as part of a segment titled "Real or Fake".

On December 24, 2016, Shropshire performed on Fox News Channel's "FOX and Friends."

On December 26, 2019, Shropshire was featured in the Wall Street Journal article "What's Your Workout" by Jen Murphy.

== Later years ==
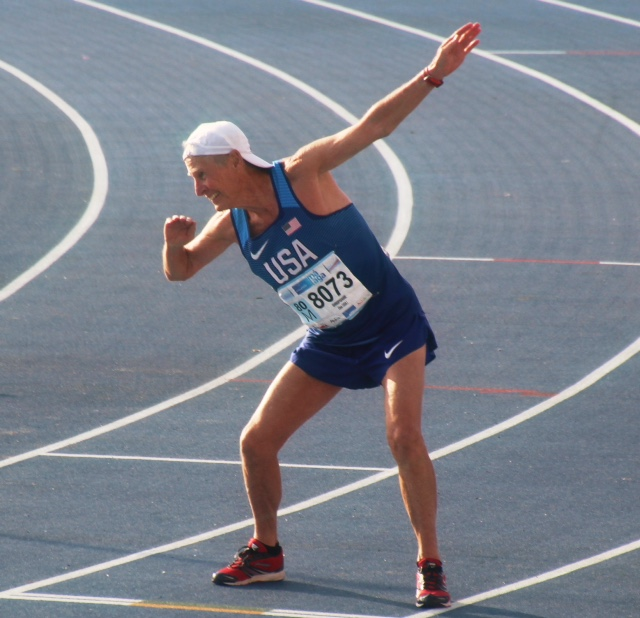
World Masters Championships 2018

Today, Shropshire lives in Novato, California with his wife, Pam Wendell. Wendell was a saleswoman and distributor for the "Grandma Got Run Over by a Reindeer" records before the song was picked up by a major label. Since 1992, he has recorded several solo albums under the name Dr. Elmo. He has been a competitive runner for 25 years.

On October 13, 2012, he won his age division in the United States National 5K Cross Country Championship in San Diego, California. On October 27, 2013, he won a gold medal in the World Master's Games as part of the USA 4×400 relay team in Porto Allegre, Brazil. In October 2019, Shropshire won the US National 5K Cross Country Championship in his age division.

2022 RACING: Ranked #1 in the World in the Mile & 5K in his age division. Elmo is the USATF National Outdoor Champion (Lexington, KY) in the 400, 800, and 1500M and ranked #1 in the US in those distances. He is the USATF 8K cross country champion. (San Diego, Ca) Shropshire is the 2022 National Senior Games Champion in the 800, 1500, and 5K. (Ft. Lauderdale, Fl)

== Discography ==
=== Elmo & Patsy ===
==== Albums ====
- Playin' Possum (as The Homestead Act) (1974)
- Elmo & Patsy (1974)
- Will You Be Ready? (1980)
- Grandma Got Run Over by a Reindeer (1982)

==== Singles ====
| Year | Single | Peak positions | | Album |
| Year | Single | US Country | US | Album |
|---|---|---|---|---|
| 1979 | "Grandma Got Run Over by a Reindeer" | — | — | —N/a |
| 1982 | "Grandma Got Run Over by a Reindeer" (re-recording) | 92 | — | Grandma Got Run Over by a Reindeer |
| 1992 | "Grandma Got Run Over by a Reindeer" (re-recording) | — | 112 | Grandma Got Run Over by a Reindeer |
| 1997 | "Grandma Got Run Over by a Reindeer" (re-recording) | 64 | 87 | Grandma Got Run Over by a Reindeer |
| 1999 | "Grandma Got Run Over by a Reindeer" (re-recording) | 48 | — | Grandma Got Run Over by a Reindeer |
"—" denotes releases that did not chart

=== Dr. Elmo ===
==== Albums ====
- Dr. Elmo's Twisted Christmas (1992)
- Dr. Elmo's Twisted Tunes (1993)
- Love, Death, and Taxes (2000)
- Up Your Chimney (2000)
- Dr. Elmo's MisceLOONYous Tunes (2000)
- Grandma Got Run Over by a Reindeer (2002)
- Christmas in the U.S.A. (2004)
- Dr. Elmo Sings the Boos (2005)
- Redneck Dracula (2006) (with the Halloween Ghouls)
- Redneck Santa (2007)
- Dr. Elmo Bluegrass Christmas (2010)
- Old Kentucky Home (2013)

== Filmography ==
- 2000 - Grandma Got Run Over by a Reindeer — Grandpa Spankenheimer, Adult Jake (Narrator)

=== Dr. Elmo music videos ===
- Grandma Got Run Over by a Reindeer
- Grandma Got Run Over by a Reindeer Rap Version
- Grandma's Killer Fruitcake
- Uncle Johnny's Glass Eye
- Christmas All Across the USA
- Blame it On El Nino
- The Witch and the Toad
- Christmas in the USA
- Prison Without Martha Stewart
- All I Want for Christmas is My Two Front Teeth
- Haunted Hoedown
- Pointy the Pyramid Pumpkin
- Redneck Dracula
- Doomsday Waltz
- The Fly
- The Scariest Thing I'll Ever Do
- What Scares You?
