= Tumba Church =

- Tumba kyrka
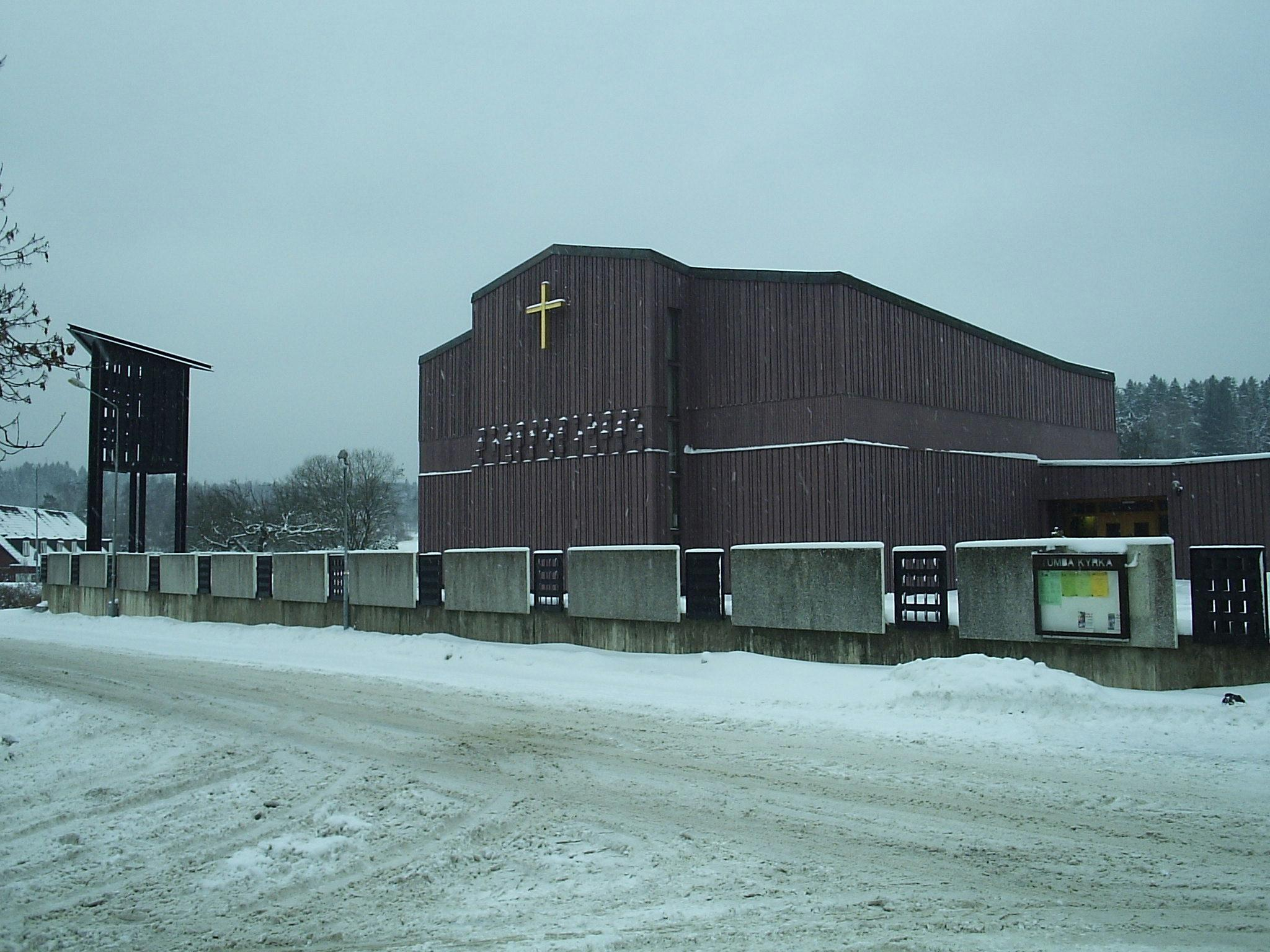
- Tumba Church in February 2006.
- Tumba Church
- Country: Sweden
- Denomination: Church of Sweden

History
- Consecrated: 1973

Administration
- Diocese: Stockholm

Tumba Church (Swedish: Tumba kyrka) is a church building in Tumba, Botkyrka, Sweden.

== See also ==
- Tullinge Church
