= Beata Bergström =

Swedish photographer (1921–2016)

- Born: Hedvig Beata Marianne Björkman; 13 August 1921; Uddevalla, Sweden
- Died: 12 October 2016 (aged 95)
- Occupation: Photographer
- Years active: 1953–2016
- Known for: Theatre photography and portraiture

Hedvig Beata Marianne Bergström (née Björkman) (13 August 1921 – 12 October 2016) was a Swedish photographer. She is known for her portraits and dance and theatre images taken at the Royal Dramatic Theatre, Royal Swedish Opera, Vasa Theatre and other Stockholm theatres.

== Career ==
Bergström studied at the Otte Sköld painting school in the late 1940s and then worked as a photography apprentice. She started her career as a theatre photographer in 1953 when she took photographs of the Cramer Ballet at the Chat Noir in Oslo.

At the same time, she photographed a rehearsal at the Royal Dramatic Theatre of Olof Molander's Oresteia for the Swedish newspaper Dagens Nyheter. This led to her working there for 30 years and a collaboration with Ingmar Bergman for about 10 years starting with Who's Afraid of Virginia Woolf?. She continued to work freelance at a number of theatres and dance companies including the Royal Swedish Opera, Gamla Stan Theatre, the Stockholm City Theatre, Vasateatern, Uppsala's Little Theatre, and Folkteatern. She also worked with the Swedish magazines Industria and Vi. She photographed numerous people in the Swedish theatrical scene including Ingmar Bergman, Anders Ek, Ernst-Hugo Järegård, Sif Ruud, Ulf Palme, Elsa-Marianne von Rosen, and Mimi Pollak.

== Style ==
Up until Bergström, theatrical photography was staged, whereby actors and sets were arranged in tableaux. Bergström changed this by having a more documentary approach, where she photographed actual rehearsals and performances.

== Personal life ==
Bergström had a son, Stefan, and lived until her death on 12 October 2016 in Järna, Sweden.

== Exhibitions ==
Bergman in Focus – Nobel Laureates Find a Director, 21 September 2008 to 18 January 2009, Photographers K.G. Kristoffersson, Lennart Nilsson, Beata Bergström, Bo-Erik Gyberg, Per Adolphson, Arne Carlsson and Bengt Wanselius.
Photo, 19 April 2013 to 6 January 2014, Beata Bergström, Music and Theatre Museum, Stockholm.

== Bibliography ==
Swedish Design, Denise Hagsromer, atelj'e bellander and Beata Bergström (photographs), Sweden, nordisk rotogravyr, 1958.
Ten Years with the Royal Dramatic Theatre (in Swedish), Beata Bergström, Stockholm, Nord. rotogravure, 1964, OCLC Number 16689310
Theater – Art of the Moment Captured in Photos (in Swedish), Beata Bergström, Stockholm, Natur & Kultur, 1976, ISBN 91-27-00716-2
The Dynamics of the Living (in Swedish), Beata Bergström, Stockholm, Kosmos, 1976, ISBN 9789186066307.
Beyond a broad ocean: Kristina (in Swedish), Beata Bergstro¨m, Jan Mark, Lars Rudolfsson, Joel Berg, Lund, Leander Malmsten, 1996, ISBN 91-88700-267.
