= Sheldon Bergstrom =

Canadian actor (1971–2023)

- Born: November 22, 1971; Prince Albert, Saskatchewan, Canada
- Died: June 18, 2023 (aged 51)
- Occupations: Film, television and stage actor
- Known for: Rob Ford: The Musical

Sheldon Bergstrom (November 22, 1971 – June 18, 2023) was a Canadian film, television and stage actor.

== Career ==
In 2014, it was announced that Bergstrom had been cast as Rob Ford in Factory Theatre's production of Rob Ford: The Musical. His roles have included Edna Turnblad in Hairspray, Franz in The Producers, Horton in Seussical and Mr. Bumble in Oliver, as well as guest appearances in episodes of Corner Gas and InSecurity. He was also a frequent host of Telemiracle telethons in Saskatchewan.

== Personal life and death ==
Originally from Prince Albert, Saskatchewan, he was based in Regina.

Sheldon died on June 18, 2023, at the age of 51.

== Filmography ==
=== Film ===
Year	Title	Role	Notes
1999	Held Up	Reservist	Uncredited
2001	The Incredible Elephant	Jack	
2001	Shot in the Face	Craig	
2016	A.R.C.H.I.E.	Sydney	
2017	The Humanity Bureau	Gas Jockey	
2018	Welcome to Nowhere	Bernie	
2018	A.R.C.H.I.E. 2: Mission Impawsible	Sydney	
2018	SuperGrid	Brezhnev	

=== Television ===
Year	Title	Role	Notes
2002	Body & Soul	Butch Goshen	Episode: "Saviors"
2002	I Downloaded a Ghost	Simon	Television film
2004	Corner Gas	Todd / Local Posseman	2 episodes
2006	Touch the Top of the World	Teacher	Television film
2011	InSecurity	Patient	Episode: "Spies on Ice"
