= Tullinge =

Suburb of Greater Stockholm, Sweden

- Location within Stockholm
- Coordinates: 59°12′N 17°54′E
- Country: Sweden
- County: Stockholm County

Population (2010)
  - Total: 16,000
- Time zone: UTC+1 (CET)
  - Summer (DST): UTC+2 (CEST)
- ISO 3166 code: SE
- Province: Södermanland
- Postcode: 146 XX
- Density is calculated using land area only.

Tullinge is a suburb of Greater Stockholm, Sweden. It is located in the eastern part of Botkyrka Municipality, on the border to the Flemingsberg part of Huddinge Municipality. It had approximately 20,000 inhabitants in 2011.

Tullinge has become known for the Airforce airfield (F18), now closed down and mostly turned into student apartments.

Tullinge is a part of Stockholm commuter rail, which was built in 1968.

== Climate ==
The weather station of Tullinge is located in a frost hollow outside the urban heat island of Stockholm at the old Airforce airfield and regularly sees significantly colder night temperatures compared to the other stations in Stockholm as a result of that. Tullinge has a humid continental climate (Dfb) with a high diurnal range, and a relatively low amount of precipitation as is typical of south-eastern Sweden.

Climate data for Tullinge (2002-2018)
Month	Jan	Feb	Mar	Apr	May	Jun	Jul	Aug	Sep	Oct	Nov	Dec	Year
Record high °C (°F)	10.9 (51.6)	11.4 (52.5)	18.1 (64.6)	24.0 (75.2)	27.8 (82.0)	29.5 (85.1)	31.6 (88.9)	31.1 (88.0)	24.9 (76.8)	19.2 (66.6)	13.7 (56.7)	12.2 (54.0)	31.6 (88.9)
Mean daily maximum °C (°F)	−0.7 (30.7)	−0.6 (30.9)	3.5 (38.3)	9.4 (48.9)	15.7 (60.3)	20.2 (68.4)	21.8 (71.2)	20.4 (68.7)	15.8 (60.4)	10.5 (50.9)	4.6 (40.3)	0.9 (33.6)	10.1 (50.2)
Daily mean °C (°F)	−4.0 (24.8)	−4.2 (24.4)	−1.1 (30.0)	4.8 (40.6)	9.5 (49.1)	14.3 (57.7)	15.9 (60.6)	14.9 (58.8)	10.7 (51.3)	6.5 (43.7)	1.6 (34.9)	−2.1 (28.2)	5.6 (42.0)
Mean daily minimum °C (°F)	−7.2 (19.0)	−7.8 (18.0)	−5.8 (21.6)	−2.2 (28.0)	3.4 (38.1)	8.3 (46.9)	10.0 (50.0)	9.4 (48.9)	5.6 (42.1)	2.6 (36.7)	−1.3 (29.7)	−5.0 (23.0)	0.8 (33.5)
Record low °C (°F)	−28.9 (−20.0)	−30.7 (−23.3)	−28.3 (−18.9)	−14.0 (6.8)	−8.6 (16.5)	−2.1 (28.2)	2.7 (36.9)	−2.2 (28.0)	−6.2 (20.8)	−12.0 (10.4)	−20.3 (−4.5)	−29.8 (−21.6)	−30.7 (−23.3)
Average precipitation mm (inches)	42 (1.7)	30 (1.2)	27 (1.1)	27 (1.1)	35 (1.4)	59 (2.3)	57 (2.2)	80 (3.1)	47 (1.9)	56 (2.2)	55 (2.2)	50 (2.0)	565 (22.4)
Source: SMHI Open Data

== History ==
Tullinge was first mentioned in connection with the literary peasant Clauus i þulunge, this happened on May 26, 1353 when he did a soil replacement in Botkyrka. This is mentioned in a legal document from the Svarta Löts ting.

The remains of two prehistoric hillforts are present near Tullingesjön: Skansberget and Örnberget. In the 19th century several artifacts from the Bronze Age and Iron Age were found, including one collection named Tullingeskatten (Tullinge treasure) which included two axes and a shard.

== Education ==
Tullinge has seven primary schools and two secondary schools.

Primary schools:

- Banslättsskolan (F-5)
- Eklidsskolan (F-5) (built 1947)
- Falkbergsskolan (6-9)
- Parkhemsskolan (F-5)
- Rikstens skola (F-9)
- Trädgårddsstadsskolan (F-9)
- Tullingebergsskolan (F-5)

Secondary schools:

- Tullinge gymnasium
- Gullvivan gymnasium

== Tullinge station ==
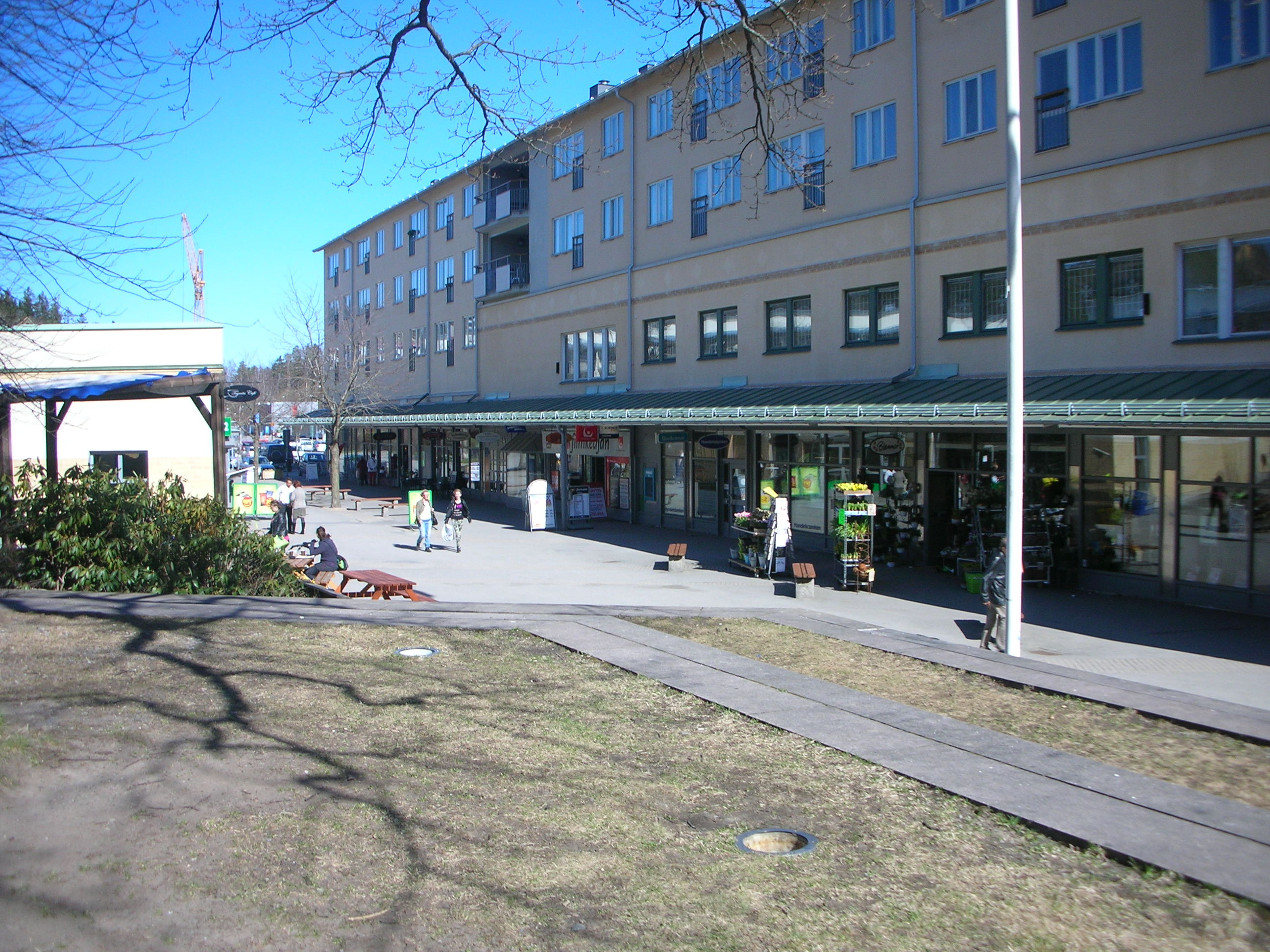
image

When western main line was drawn through Tullinge at the end of the 1800s there were no station Tullinge, but when they built the track to double in 1903, they also built a bus stop. 1917 was upgraded to the bus stop station. Tullinge station was moved 1.5 kilometers northeast associated with the building of the new center in Tullinge. The location of the new station was more accessible to residents, and the new location allowed more apartment buildings and townhouses could be built.

== Sports ==
Tullinge has a rich sporting life with many sports clubs. Tullinge also has sportgrounds BrantBrinks IP and Lida outdoor facility which is the hub of Tullinge Sport.

Sports Clubs in Tullinge.

- Tullinge SK (Orienteering, bike and skis)
- FBI Tullinge (Floorball)
- Tullinge TP FK (Football, Hockey)
- Tullinge Canoe Association (Canoe)
- Tullinge BK (Football)

== See also ==
- Tullinge torg
- Tullinge kyrka
