= Don Bergstrom =

American politician

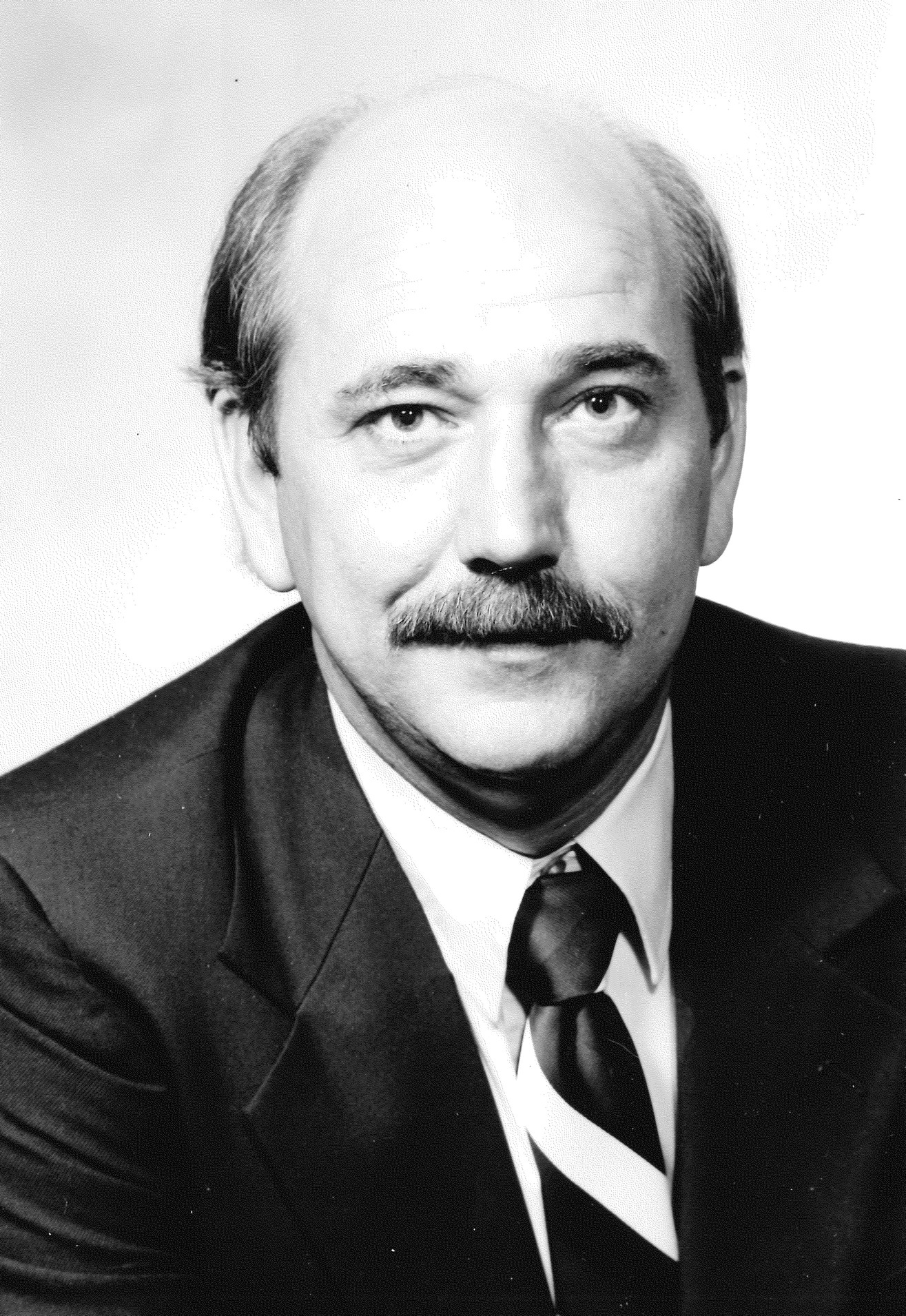
- Bergstrom c. 1983

Member of the Minnesota House of Representatives from the 18B District
- In office January 3, 1983 – January 6, 1985
- Governor: Rudy Perpich

Personal details
- Born: June 29, 1945 (age 81) Minnesota, U.S.
- Other political affiliations: Minnesota Democratic–Farmer–Labor Party
- Education: University of Minnesota (B.A.)

Don Bergstrom (born June 29, 1945) was an American politician and businessman.

Bergstrom was born in Minnesota and lived in Big Lake, Sherburne County, Minnesota with his wife and family. He went to the Northwestern Electronics Institute and received his bachelor's degree in vocational education from University of Minnesota. Bergstrom was the administrator of the Wright Vocational Cooperative Center. Bergstrom served in the Minnesota House of Representatives in 1983 and 1984 and was a Democrat.
