= Bergstrom Nutrition =

- Type: Private
- Industry: Dietary supplement
- Founded: 1988
- Fate: Acquired by Balchem Corporation
- Headquarters: Vancouver, Washington, United States
- Products: OptiMSM®, PurforMSM®
- Number of employees: < less than 50
- Website: bergstromnutrition.com

Bergstrom Nutrition is a United States dietary supplement manufacturer. As of June 2015, they are the only North American manufactures of Methylsulfonylmethane (MSM), an ingredient utilized in dietary supplement products.

Bergstrom Nutrition use proprietary technologies for the distillation and purification of MSM. This along with their extensive published safety data allowed their product to be self-affirmed as "Generally recognized as safe" (GRAS) receiving a letter of non-objection from the United States Food and Drug Administration.

== History ==
Bergstrom Nutrition (originally named Cardinal Associates) was founded in 1988 by George Bergstrom and Bob Cowan, chemical engineers who worked with dimethylsulfoxide (DMSO) and dimethyl sulfone (DMSO2)/methylsulfonylmethane (MSM). The founders were first to introduce MSM as a dietary supplement to both the animal and human markets.

In 1998, Bergstrom Nutrition built a manufacturing facility dedicated solely to the production of MSM in Vancouver, Washington that is ISO 9001:2008 registered, FSSC 22000:2010 certified and HACCP and cGMP compliant.

In August 2022, Bergstrom Nutrition was acquired by Balchem Corporation, an ingredients supplier.

== Products ==
Bergstrom Nutrition produces raw MSM material branded as OptiMSM (for the human market) and PurforMSM (for the animal market). OptiMSM is the only MSM designated as GRAS, receiving a Letter of Non-Objection from the FDA. OptiMSM based products are available in India in both oral(TOR™ Bright) and topical(OptiMIST WaterBody® Aqua) formats exclusively at CHOSEN® store, by special arrangement with Bergstrom Nutrition.

== See also ==
- Schiff Nutrition International
