= Grandma Got Run Over by a Reindeer =

- Picture sleeve of 1984 release by Epic (34-04703)

Single by Elmo & Patsy

from the album Grandma Got Run Over by a Reindeer
- B-side: "Christmas" (Elmo 'n' Patsy; Oink; Soundwaves); "Percy, the Puny Poinsettia" (Epic)
- Released: 1979 (Elmo 'n' Patsy); 1982 (Oink; Soundwaves); 1984 (Epic)
- Recorded: 1978
- Genre: Christmas, country, novelty, pop
- Length: 3:30 (Elmo 'n' Patsy; Oink; Soundwaves); 3:26 (Epic)
- Label: Elmo 'n' Patsy 2984; Oink 2984; Soundwaves 4658; Epic 34-04703
- Songwriter: Randy Brooks
- Producer: Gary Potterton

"Grandma Got Run Over by a Reindeer" is a novelty Christmas song. Written by Randy Brooks, the song was originally performed by Elmo Shropshire in 1979 under the brand of Elmo and Patsy, the double act Shropshire had with his then-wife Patsy Trigg.

== Lyrics ==
In the song's lyrics, the narrator describes their grandmother venturing into a snowstorm on Christmas Eve, while drunk on eggnog and off her medications. The following morning, her family discovers she has been being trampled by Santa Claus and his reindeer. The narrator's grandfather shows little concern over his wife's apparent demise, while the narrator declares to friends and neighbors that Santa is unfit to carry a driver's license. The music video has the grandmother coming down the chimney, revealing she survived the incident.

== Releases ==
According to Brooks, he came up with the idea for the song after observing a "tipsy relative" of his. Brooks's uncle, Foster Brooks, was a famous comedian well known for his act as a drunk. After his own band dissuaded him from recording the record himself, he sat in with Elmo and Patsy at the Hyatt Lake Tahoe in December 1978, and after the show he offered the song to the duo, who were instantly impressed and commissioned a cassette of the song for them to learn. Elmo claimed, after his divorce from Patsy, that Patsy never sang on the record (even as a backup vocalist) and was only credited because their established double act used both names, noting in the interview "that's another story." Under the terms of their partnership, Patsy's parents (who were established in the Southern gospel industry) earned the publishing rights to the record and would pay Brooks his due royalties, while Elmo would own the master recording and handle distribution; Elmo subsequently went on an aggressive marketing campaign to promote the song with the assistance of his future second wife, saleswoman Pam Wendell. A year later, they were selling 45s of the song from the stage, with Elmo himself appearing in drag on the album cover as "Grandma". Wendell and Shropshire opted to bypass the record stores when selling the records, fearing it would go unnoticed compared to bigger stars, instead opting to rack job the record at pharmacies that would sell the record as seasonal merchandise.

The song was originally self-released in San Francisco by the Shropshires in 1979 on their own record label (on "Elmo 'n' Patsy" #2984), with the B-side titled "Christmas". Initial copies appeared on a cream-colored label, with a sketch of a pig clearly visible, at left. Once initial copies had sold out, later-pressed #2984 cream-colored 45 label copies retained the same pig sketch, but decided to both move the sketch and add the word "Oink" to the top of the 45's label. Meanwhile, the duo's names were moved to the bottom of the label, below the song title. By the early 1980s, the song was becoming a seasonal hit, first on country stations and then on Top 40 stations. Oink Records, still based in Windsor, California, continued distribution of the 45 rpm record in the western U.S., with "Nationwide Sound Distributors" (NSD) of Nashville, Tennessee, pressing and distributing the song on its Soundwaves Records in the eastern U.S., peaking at #92 on the country singles charts. Shropshire credited KSFO in San Francisco, California with helping give the record major exposure. Not long after, the record was discovered by novelty music radio host Dr. Demento, who gave the record national exposure.

Following the Shropshires' divorce, Elmo re-recorded it solo in 1992 and again in 2000, both times largely faithful to his previous recording. Both recordings were done largely to regain control of his master recording rights after he had sold them to CBS Records (now Sony Music Entertainment) as part of the 1982 distribution deal; Shropshire noted that he had to be aggressive when others wanted to use the recording, often negotiating a lower fee than Sony offered for the recordings he sold.

== Covers ==
The song has been recorded in 1982 by The Irish Rovers, released on the album, It Was a Night Like This. Their signature version, produced by Jack Richardson, rose to #20 on the RPM charts within a week of its release. The single became a seasonal hit, first on country stations, then on Top 40 stations, and today remains a 'seasonal holiday anthem'.

== Reception ==
Edison Media Research and Pinnacle Media Worldwide independently surveyed radio listeners on which Christmas songs they like and dislike. In both surveys, results of which were reported in 2007, the only song that reached the top of both liked and disliked lists was "Grandma Got Run Over by a Reindeer."

A major Washington, D.C. radio station, WASH (97.1 FM), dropped the song from its playlist. "It was too polarizing," says Bill Hess, program director. "It wasn't strong, except with a few people, and it had a lot of negatives." The song also gained notoriety at Davenport, Iowa radio station WLLR in 1985 when a disc jockey played the song 27 times back-to-back during the morning show before station management was able to stop him. The disc jockey, who was suspended, was reportedly depressed and upset that a co-worker had left employment at the station to work out-of-state.

In an interview, Shropshire said the song is "a beloved holiday favorite" but also acknowledged a great deal of negative feedback, noting that for the first several years, he expected the song to lose its popularity and be forgotten, only to be astonished when it returned in popularity year after year. The song's music video was in frequent rotation on MTV during the holiday season, and has been licensed for usage in Christmas cards and musical toys. Shropshire notes:

"My royalties are four or five times what they were [20 years ago,] [...] A lot of younger people say it's not really Christmas until they hear it."

In 2024, a woman in Watertown, New York was hit by a deer during the city's turkey trot, which drew references from online commenters to the song.

== Television ==
In episode 1550 of The Tonight Show Starring Jimmy Fallon, Fallon tells a fictional story about the death of his grandmother, which is inspired by this song.

== Music video ==
The promotional music video for Elmo & Patsy's "Grandma Got Run Over by a Reindeer" was released in the mid-1980s, and aired on MTV for at least 18 years. The video could also be seen on VH1, CMT, TNN, GAC, and VH1 Classic during the holiday season, as well as on Spike's official website and YouTube. Elmo Shropshire played Grandpa and Grandma (in drag).

== Chart performance ==
Chart (1983)	Peak position
US Christmas Hits (Billboard)	1
Chart (1984)	Peak position
US Christmas Hits (Billboard)	1
US Hot Country Singles (Billboard)	92
Chart (1985)	Peak position
US Christmas Hits (Billboard)	1
Chart (1992)	Peak position
US Bubbling Under Hot 100 Singles (Billboard)	12
Chart (1997–1998)	Peak position
US Hot Country Singles & Tracks (Billboard)	64
US Billboard Hot 100	87
Chart (1999–2000)	Peak position
US Hot Country Singles & Tracks (Billboard)	48
Chart (2016)	Peak position
US Holiday 100 (Billboard)	96

== Certifications ==
Certifications for "Grandma Got Run Over by a Reindeer"
Region	Certification	Certified units/sales
United States (RIAA)	Gold	500,000^{^}
^{^} Shipments figures based on certification alone.
