= Cynthia Bergstrom =

American costume designer

Cynthia Bergstrom is a costume designer. She worked on the Wes Craven movie Scream and this then led to work on the TV series Buffy the Vampire Slayer from its second season.
