= Pauline Newstone =

Canadian voice actress (1943–2023)

- Born: August 13, 1943; Canada
- Died: May 5, 2023 (aged 79)
- Occupation: Voice actress
- Years active: 1973–2020
- Spouse: Martin Leo Mindell (1963–1964) (annulled)

Pauline Newstone (August 13, 1943 – May 5, 2023) was a Canadian voice actress best known as the voice of Airazor in the animated series Beast Wars and as Frieza in the English Ocean Productions and Westwood dubs of Dragon Ball Z. She died on May 5, 2023.

== Voice credits ==
- A Kind of Magic – Ferocia
- Adventures of Mowgli – White Cobra
- Adventures of Sonic the Hedgehog
- Beast Wars – Airazor (1996–1998)
- Being Ian – Elderly Gang Leader, Nurse Sturgeon
- Bitsy Bears – Shirley, Bramble
- Bratz: Desert Jewelz – Old Woman
- Bratz Kids: Fairy Tales – Witch
- Bucky O'Hare and the Toad Wars! – Lanelle
- Captain N: The Game Master – Additional Voices
- Captain Zed and the Zee Zone – Doris
- Cats & Dogs 3: Paws Unite! – Sis
- Class of the Titans – Campe, Medusa, Horror, Dread, Alarm
- The Cramp Twins – Lilly Parsons
- Dragon Ball Z – Frieza (1997–1998) (Ocean dub)
- Dragon Tales – Sage
- Fat Dog Mendoza – Ester
- Funky Fables – The Queen, The Witch
- Gintama° – Shop Lady
- Hamtaro - Kaitlin Endo
- Help! I'm a Fish – Aunt Anna
- InuYasha – Mistress Centipede
- Kong: The Animated Series – Harpy
- Lego Ninjago: Masters of Spinjitzu – Aspheera
- Maison Ikkoku – Yukari Godai
- Master Keaton – Ms. Belnine
- Monster Rancher – Mum Mew
- Mummies Alive! – Heka
- Ranma ½ – Sentaro's Grandmother
- Sitting Ducks – Additional Voices
- Ultimate Book of Spells
- X-Men: Evolution – Agatha Harkness
- Yvon of the Yukon – Yvonne Ducharme, Lillian Valentine (in "Valentines Day")
