= Robert W. Bergstrom =

American lawyer

Robert W. Bergstrom (1918 in Chicago, Illinois – June 4, 2006) was a lawyer, best known for defending Twentieth Century-Fox Film Corporation and its associates in a suit brought by Nathan Leopold, alleging that the film Compulsion used his court case for profit. Leopold and Richard Loeb had been sentenced to life in prison in a high-profile court case for the kidnap and murder of Robert Franks in 1924. Due to his work in this case, and the eventual decision in favor of the defendants, Bergstrom won the Preeminent Bar Rating from Martindale-Hubbell and has a Hollywood Walk of Fame star.
