= Lars Bergström (philosopher) =

Swedish philosopher

Lars Bergström is a Swedish philosopher and professor of practical philosophy at Stockholm University.

== Biography ==
Bergström received his PhD in 1966. His dissertation The Alternatives and Consequences of Actions attracted considerable international attention and sparked a lively and extensive discussion in professional philosophical journals. He served as a professor of practical philosophy at the University of Uppsala from 1974 until 1987, when he assumed his current position as a professor of practical philosophy at Stockholms University.

Bergström is a member of the Norwegian Academy of Science and Letters and The Royal Swedish Academy of Sciences. For many years he has also been the editor of the academic philosophy journal Filosofisk tidskrift. In 2017, he was awarded the Rettigska priset by the Royal Swedish Academy of Letters, History and Antiquities for his "internationally influential philosophical authorship and his valuable contributions to the philosophical discussion in Sweden".
