= Lars Bergström (ice hockey) =

Swedish ice hockey coach

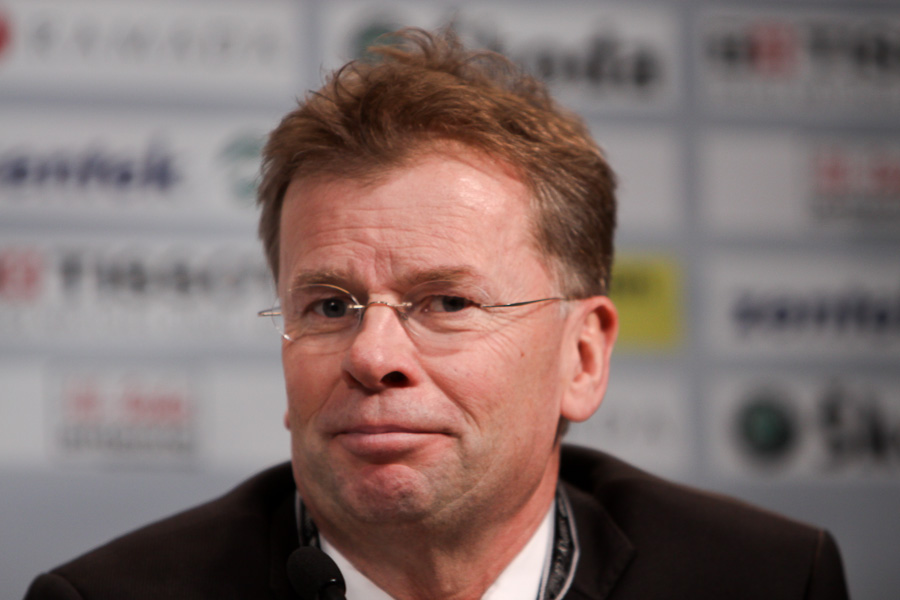
Lars "Osten" Bergström

Lars Bergström (born May 9, 1956) is a Swedish ice hockey manager. He used to be head coach of the Austria national ice hockey team.

Previously Bergström coached the Malmö Redhawks until November 2006, when he was fired with a 2–10–6 mid-season record and replaced by Canadian Dave King.
