= V/H/S (franchise) =

American horror anthology franchise

- Official franchise logo
- Created by: Brad Miska
- Original work: V/H/S (2012)
- Owners: Spooky Pictures; Image Nation Studios
- Years: 2012–present

Films and television
- Films: V/H/S (2012); V/H/S/2 (2013); V/H/S: Viral (2014); V/H/S/94 (2021); V/H/S/99 (2022); V/H/S/85 (2023); V/H/S/Beyond (2024); V/H/S/Halloween (2025); V/H/S/Mixtape (2026); V/H/S: SCP (2027)
- Television series: V/H/S: Video Horror Shorts (2018)

Miscellaneous
- Spin-off films: Siren (2016); Kids vs. Aliens (2022)

V/H/S is an American horror anthology franchise that includes nine found footage films, two spin-off films, and one short-form web miniseries. Based on an original concept by Brad Miska, the plot centers on a collection of increasingly disturbing recordings presented in various formats. Produced through collaborations between multiple filmmakers, the installments are largely standalone, though recurring elements suggest connections between some of the films.

The first spin-off film, Siren, serves as an expansion of one of the segments from the first film, and was met with a general positive critical reception. The Snapchat-released miniseries, titled V/H/S: Video Horror Shorts, received praise for its short-form format and expansion of the franchise to new media. The second spin-off film, Kids vs. Aliens, also served as an expansion of one of the segments from the second film, and was met with a mixed reception.

== Origin ==
Created in a collaboration between Brad Miska and various filmmakers, the producer developed the concept for the overall premise of V/H/S with horror producer Roxanne Benjamin, who ran the "Bloody Disgusting Selects" film distribution label at the time. As the co-founder of a horror-themed website, Bloody Disgusting, he used his connections to directors and writers and to further realize his creation. Miska described the process as a "trust fall" exercise, with the creatives developing the initial premise, which he designates as a "wrap-around" of each film; followed by the additional segments that feature as the horrific videotapes that the characters in the recurring wrap-around sequences discover. Calling the franchise "a 'fill-in-the-hole' type project", Miska encouraged creativity from the respective filmmakers, with each segment being distinct in style and story.

== Films ==
Film	U.S. release date	Segment	Director(s)	Screenwriter(s)	Story by	Concept by	Producer(s)
Main series
V/H/S	October 5, 2012	Tape 56	Adam Wingard	Simon Barrett	Simon Barrett	Brad Miska	Brad Miska, Gary Binkow, Roxanne Benjamin, Simon Barrett and Kim Sherman
V/H/S	October 5, 2012	Amateur Night	David Bruckner	David Bruckner & Nicholas Tecosky	David Bruckner & Nicholas Tecosky	Brad Miska	Brad Miska, Gary Binkow, Roxanne Benjamin, Linda Burns and David Bruckner
V/H/S	October 5, 2012	Second Honeymoon	Ti West	Ti West	Ti West	Brad Miska	Brad Miska, Gary Binkow, Roxanne Benjamin, Peter Phok and Ti West
V/H/S	October 5, 2012	Tuesday the 17th	Glenn McQuaid	Glenn McQuaid	Glenn McQuaid	Brad Miska	Brad Miska, Gary Binkow, Roxanne Benjamin, Glenn McQuaid, Lee Nussbaum and Alex Kuciw
V/H/S	October 5, 2012	The Sick Thing That Happened to Emily When She Was Younger	Joe Swanberg	Simon Barrett	Simon Barrett	Brad Miska	Brad Miska, Gary Binkow, Roxanne Benjamin, Simon Barrett and Joe Swanberg
V/H/S	October 5, 2012	10/31/98	Matt Bettinelli-Olpin, Tyler Gillett, Justin Martinez & Chad Villella			Brad Miska	Brad Miska, Gary Binkow, Roxanne Benjamin, Matt Bettinelli-Olpin, Tyler Gillett, Justin Martinez and Chad Villella
V/H/S/2	July 12, 2013	Tape 49	Simon Barrett	Simon Barrett	Simon Barrett	Brad Miska	Brad Miska, Gary Binkow, Roxanne Benjamin and Chris Harding
V/H/S/2	July 12, 2013	Phase I Clinical Trials	Adam Wingard	Simon Barrett	Simon Barrett	Brad Miska	Brad Miska, Gary Binkow, Roxanne Benjamin and Chris Harding
V/H/S/2	July 12, 2013	A Ride in the Park	Edúardo Sanchez & Gregg Hale	Jamie Nash	Jamie Nash	Brad Miska	Brad Miska, Gary Binkow, Roxanne Benjamin, Kyle D. Crosby and Jamie Nash
V/H/S/2	July 12, 2013	Safe Haven	Timo Tjahjanto & Gareth Evans	Timo Tjahjanto & Gareth Evans	Timo Tjahjanto	Brad Miska	Brad Miska, Gary Binkow, Roxanne Benjamin and Kimo Stamboel
V/H/S/2	July 12, 2013	Slumber Party Alien Abduction	Jason Eisener	Jason Eisener & John Davies	Jason Eisener & John Davies	Brad Miska	Brad Miska, Gary Binkow, Roxanne Benjamin and Rob Cotterill
V/H/S: Viral	November 21, 2014	Vicious Circles	Marcel Sarmiento	T.J. Cimfel, David White & Marcel Sarmiento	T.J. Cimfel, David White & Marcel Sarmiento	Brad Miska	Brad Miska, Gary Binkow, Adam Hendricks and John Lang
V/H/S: Viral	November 21, 2014	Dante the Great	Gregg Bishop	Gregg Bishop	Gregg Bishop	Brad Miska	Brad Miska, Gary Binkow, Gregg Bishop, Dan Caudill, Stephen Caudill and Nils Onsager
V/H/S: Viral	November 21, 2014	Parallel Monsters	Nacho Vigalondo	Nacho Vigalondo	Nacho Vigalondo	Brad Miska	Brad Miska, Gary Binkow, Nahikari Ipiña
V/H/S: Viral	November 21, 2014	Bonestorm	Justin Benson and Aaron Moorhead	Justin Benson	Justin Benson	Brad Miska	Brad Miska, Gary Binkow, David Lawson, Justin Benson, Aaron Moorhead and Theo Brooks
V/H/S: Viral	November 21, 2014	Gorgeous Vortex^{*}	Todd Lincoln	Todd Lincoln	Todd Lincoln	Brad Miska	Brad Miska and Gary Binkow
V/H/S/94	October 6, 2021	Holy Hell	Jennifer Reeder	Jennifer Reeder	Jennifer Reeder	Brad Miska & David Bruckner	Brad Miska, Gary Binkow, David Bruckner, Matt Bettinelli-Olpin, Tyler Gillett, Chad Villella, Josh Goldbloom and Parinda Patel
V/H/S/94	October 6, 2021	Storm Drain	Chloe Okuno	Chloe Okuno	Chloe Okuno	Brad Miska & David Bruckner	Brad Miska, Gary Binkow, David Bruckner, Matt Bettinelli-Olpin, Tyler Gillett, Chad Villella, Josh Goldbloom and Parinda Patel
V/H/S/94	October 6, 2021	The Veggie Masher^{†}	Steven Kostanski	Chloe Okuno	Chloe Okuno	Brad Miska & David Bruckner	Brad Miska, Gary Binkow, David Bruckner, Matt Bettinelli-Olpin, Tyler Gillett, Chad Villella, Josh Goldbloom and Parinda Patel
V/H/S/94	October 6, 2021	The Empty Wake	Simon Barrett	Simon Barrett	Simon Barrett	Brad Miska & David Bruckner	Brad Miska, Gary Binkow, David Bruckner, Matt Bettinelli-Olpin, Tyler Gillett, Chad Villella, Josh Goldbloom and Parinda Patel
V/H/S/94	October 6, 2021	The Subject	Timo Tjahjanto	Timo Tjahjanto	Timo Tjahjanto	Brad Miska & David Bruckner	Brad Miska, Gary Binkow, David Bruckner, Matt Bettinelli-Olpin, Tyler Gillett, Chad Villella, Josh Goldbloom and Parinda Patel
V/H/S/94	October 6, 2021	Terror	Ryan Prows	Ryan Prows	Ryan Prows	Brad Miska & David Bruckner	Brad Miska, Gary Binkow, David Bruckner, Matt Bettinelli-Olpin, Tyler Gillett, Chad Villella, Josh Goldbloom and Parinda Patel
V/H/S/99	October 20, 2022	Shredding	Maggie Levin	Maggie Levin	Maggie Levin	Brad Miska & David Bruckner	Brad Miska, David Bruckner, Matt Bettinelli-Olpin, Tyler Gillett, Chad Villella, Josh Goldbloom and James Harris
V/H/S/99	October 20, 2022	Suicide Bid	Johannes Roberts	Johannes Roberts	Johannes Roberts	Brad Miska & David Bruckner	Brad Miska, David Bruckner, Matt Bettinelli-Olpin, Tyler Gillett, Chad Villella, Josh Goldbloom and James Harris
V/H/S/99	October 20, 2022	Ozzy's Dungeon	Flying Lotus	Zoe Cooper & Flying Lotus	Zoe Cooper & Flying Lotus	Brad Miska & David Bruckner	Brad Miska, David Bruckner, Matt Bettinelli-Olpin, Tyler Gillett, Chad Villella, Josh Goldbloom and James Harris
V/H/S/99	October 20, 2022	The Gawkers	Tyler MacIntyre	Chris Lee Hill & Tyler MacIntyre	Chris Lee Hill & Tyler MacIntyre	Brad Miska & David Bruckner	Brad Miska, David Bruckner, Matt Bettinelli-Olpin, Tyler Gillett, Chad Villella, Josh Goldbloom, James Harris and John Negropontes
V/H/S/99	October 20, 2022	To Hell and Back	Vanessa Winter & Joseph Winter	Vanessa Winter & Joseph Winter	Vanessa Winter & Joseph Winter	Brad Miska & David Bruckner	Brad Miska, David Bruckner, Matt Bettinelli-Olpin, Tyler Gillett, Chad Villella, Josh Goldbloom, James Harris, Jared Cook, Joseph Winter and Vanessa Winter
V/H/S/85	October 6, 2023	Total Copy	David Bruckner	Evan Dickson	Evan Dickson	Brad Miska & David Bruckner	Brad Miska, Josh Goldbloom, David Bruckner, Chad Villella, Matt Bettinelli-Olpin, Tyler Gillett, and James Harris
V/H/S/85	October 6, 2023	No Wake	Mike P. Nelson	Mike P. Nelson	Mike P. Nelson	Brad Miska & David Bruckner	Brad Miska, Josh Goldbloom, David Bruckner, Chad Villella, Matt Bettinelli-Olpin, Tyler Gillett, and James Harris
V/H/S/85	October 6, 2023	God of Death	Gigi Saul Guerrero	Gigi Saul Guerrero	Gigi Saul Guerrero	Brad Miska & David Bruckner	Brad Miska, Josh Goldbloom, David Bruckner, Chad Villella, Matt Bettinelli-Olpin, Tyler Gillett, and James Harris
V/H/S/85	October 6, 2023	TKNOGD	Natasha Kermani	Zoe Cooper	Zoe Cooper	Brad Miska & David Bruckner	Brad Miska, Josh Goldbloom, David Bruckner, Chad Villella, Matt Bettinelli-Olpin, Tyler Gillett, and James Harris
V/H/S/85	October 6, 2023	Ambrosia	Mike P. Nelson	Mike P. Nelson	Mike P. Nelson	Brad Miska & David Bruckner	Brad Miska, Josh Goldbloom, David Bruckner, Chad Villella, Matt Bettinelli-Olpin, Tyler Gillett, and James Harris
V/H/S/85	October 6, 2023	Dreamkill	Scott Derrickson	Scott Derrickson & C. Robert Cargill	Scott Derrickson & C. Robert Cargill	Brad Miska & David Bruckner	Brad Miska, Josh Goldbloom, David Bruckner, Chad Villella, Matt Bettinelli-Olpin, Tyler Gillett, and James Harris
V/H/S/Beyond	October 4, 2024	Abduction/Adduction	Jay Cheel	Jay Cheel	Jay Cheel	Brad Miska	Brad Miska, Josh Goldbloom, James Harris, Michael Schreiber and Brian Robertson
V/H/S/Beyond	October 4, 2024	Stork	Jordan Downey	Jordan Downey & Kevin Stewart; Based on artwork by: Oleg Vdovenko		Brad Miska	Brad Miska, Josh Goldbloom, James Harris and Michael Schreiber
V/H/S/Beyond	October 4, 2024	Dream Girl	Virat Pal	Virat Pal & Evan Dickson	Virat Pal & Evan Dickson	Brad Miska	Brad Miska, Josh Goldbloom, James Harris, Michael Schreiber and Nehal Pal
V/H/S/Beyond	October 4, 2024	Live and Let Dive	Justin Martinez	Justin Martinez & Ben Turner	Justin Martinez & Ben Turner	Brad Miska	Brad Miska, Josh Goldbloom, James Harris and Michael Schreiber
V/H/S/Beyond	October 4, 2024	Fur Babies	Christian Long & Justin Long	Christian Long & Justin Long	Christian Long & Justin Long	Brad Miska	Brad Miska, Josh Goldbloom, James Harris and Michael Schreiber
V/H/S/Beyond	October 4, 2024	Stowaway	Kate Siegel	Mike Flanagan	Mike Flanagan	Brad Miska	Brad Miska, Josh Goldbloom, James Harris and Michael Schreiber
V/H/S/Halloween	October 3, 2025	Diet Phantasma	Bryan M. Ferguson	Bryan M. Ferguson	Bryan M. Ferguson	Brad Miska	Brad Miska, Josh Goldbloom, James Harris and Michael Schreiber
V/H/S/Halloween	October 3, 2025	Coochie Coochie Coo	Anna Zlokovic	Anna Zlokovic	Anna Zlokovic	Brad Miska	Brad Miska, Josh Goldbloom, James Harris and Michael Schreiber
V/H/S/Halloween	October 3, 2025	Ut Supra Sic Infra	Paco Plaza	Paco Plaza & Alberto Marini	Paco Plaza & Alberto Marini	Brad Miska	Brad Miska, Josh Goldbloom, James Harris and Michael Schreiber
V/H/S/Halloween	October 3, 2025	Fun Size	Casper Kelly	Casper Kelly	Casper Kelly	Brad Miska	Brad Miska, Josh Goldbloom, James Harris and Michael Schreiber
V/H/S/Halloween	October 3, 2025	Kidprint	Alex Ross Perry	Alex Ross Perry	Alex Ross Perry	Brad Miska	Brad Miska, Josh Goldbloom, James Harris and Michael Schreiber
V/H/S/Halloween	October 3, 2025	Home Haunt	Micheline Pitt-Norman & R.H. Norman	Micheline Pitt-Norman & R.H. Norman	Micheline Pitt-Norman & R.H. Norman	Brad Miska	Brad Miska, Josh Goldbloom, James Harris and Michael Schreiber
V/H/S/Mixtape	October 9, 2026	Gwar Is...	Flying Lotus	Flying Lotus	Flying Lotus	Brad Miska	Brad Miska, Josh Goldbloom, Roy Lee, Steven Schneider and Michael Schreiber
V/H/S/Mixtape	October 9, 2026	Dance, Dance, Dance, Dance	Renee Zhan	Zoe Cooper	Renee Zhan	Brad Miska	Brad Miska, Josh Goldbloom, Roy Lee, Steven Schneider and Michael Schreiber
V/H/S/Mixtape	October 9, 2026	Another Cabin**	Flying Lotus	Flying Lotus	Flying Lotus	Brad Miska	Brad Miska, Josh Goldbloom, Roy Lee, Steven Schneider and Michael Schreiber
V/H/S/Mixtape	October 9, 2026	Heartbeat	David Moreau	David Moreau	David Moreau	Brad Miska	Brad Miska, Josh Goldbloom, Roy Lee, Steven Schneider and Michael Schreiber
V/H/S/Mixtape	October 9, 2026	The Music of Mr. Sze	Ernest Dickerson	Ernest Dickerson	Ernest Dickerson	Brad Miska	Brad Miska, Josh Goldbloom, Roy Lee, Steven Schneider and Michael Schreiber
V/H/S/Mixtape	October 9, 2026	Premature Burial**	Tobias Forge	Tobias Forge	Tobias Forge	Brad Miska	Brad Miska, Josh Goldbloom, Roy Lee, Steven Schneider and Michael Schreiber
V/H/S/Mixtape	October 9, 2026	Death Tone	RZA	RZA & Matt Landsman	RZA & Matt Landsman	Brad Miska	Brad Miska, Josh Goldbloom, Roy Lee, Steven Schneider and Michael Schreiber
V/H/S: SCP	2027	TBA	TBA	TBA	TBA	Brad Miska	Josh Goldbloom, Roy Lee, Steven Schneider and Michael Schreiber
Spin-off films
Siren	December 2, 2016	—N/a	Gregg Bishop	Ben Collins and Luke Piotrowski	Ben Collins and Luke Piotrowski	—N/a	Brad Miska, Gary Binkow and Jude S. Walko
Kids vs. Aliens	January 20, 2023	—N/a	Jason Eisener	John Davies & Jason Eisener	John Davies & Jason Eisener	—N/a	Brad Miska, Rob Cotterill, Josh Goldbloom, Jason Levangie and Marc Tetreault

^{*}The "Gorgeous Vortex" segment was completed for the film, but was left out of the final cut.

^{†}Faux-TV commercial embedded in the middle of the "Storm Drain" segment.

^{**}Music video interludes presented during the "Gwar Is..." segment.

=== Main series ===
==== V/H/S (2012) ====
As a group of small time criminals record their crimes, they agree to a hire that asks them to break into a home to retrieve a specific VHS tape. As they commence their search they discover the home owner, an elderly man, has died while watching a series of tapes on his assortment of stacked televisions. As they continue to look for the requested video, each tape contains a sequence of terror recorded by home video camera. These recordings include: a group of boorish friends who plan to meet some women at a nightclub, only to be brutally attacked by a deadly siren; a young couple vacationing in the American southwest and the lethal burglary of their hotel room by a stalker; a group of friends who take a road trip to visit a secluded area in the woods and are faced with an unidentifiable murderous entity that appears as tracking errors on their camera; a video chat where a young woman contacts her med student boyfriend regarding an agitated bump on her arm, which is revealed to be the result of a tracking device placed within her by extraterrestrials who are conducting experiments on unknowing individuals; and a group of young men who attend a party on Halloween night only to arrive at the wrong house, and must face paranormal phenomena with poltergeists, and an exorcism conducted on a woman by a cult.

All the while unbeknownst to the thieves, one by one they begin to inexplicably disappear after each tape is viewed. Meanwhile, the deceased homeowner begins to reanimate and begins an attack on the remaining survivors.

==== V/H/S/2 (2013) ====
A mother hires a private investigator named Larry and his girlfriend Ayesha, to look for her college-age son named Kyle, who has inexplicably gone missing. As the pair break into his dorm, they discover a stack of VHS tapes in his room, alongside a laptop computer that is in the middle of recording footage. After watching a clip of Kyle's recording on his computer, where he discusses the strange nature of these tapes and their influence on their viewer, Ayesha is tasked with watching the recorded videos while Larry continues to search the home for more evidence. Each tape includes a sequence of horror including: a man who attains a prototype ocular implant from his ophthalmologist, and is told that he may experience some glitches, only to experience various encounters with ghosts; a cyclist's ride through a forested state park, who comes across a bloodied and ailing couple that reanimate after dying only to attack everyone around them, turning them into zombies; a documentary crew that visits an Indonesian cult to record their mysterious rituals, and finds themselves in the middle of a mass suicide all while a demon arrives to rule over its worshippers; and a group of friends who record their slumber party, only to be attacked by a number of aliens who seek to abduct the young boys.

As Ayesha watches the videos, an assortment of tapes that were first discovered by some thieves in an abandoned home, she becomes hypnotized before getting sick with a migraine headache. When her nose begins to bleed, Larry frantically looks for medication in the house. When he returns to help her, she has died. Another tape is left with an instructional message of "watch" written on it. As Larry presses play on the tape, a home video of Kyle and his mother relay that they want to make their own contribution to the series of videos. A figure from the shadows emerges revealing there is more to Kyle's disappearance than initially believed.

==== V/H/S: Viral (2014) ====
An amateur videographer named Kevin, continuously films the events of his life, including footage of his girlfriend named Iris. Though she is flattered by his encouraging compliments and his desire to document everything, she eventually grows concerned with his obsessive behavior. As the pair begin to argue, a news broadcast shows that a police chase involving an ice cream truck is taking place and about to go past their apartment. Kevin hurries outside to get some footage, hoping to create an online viral video, only to miss the car chase. Iris walks outside and into the road in a trance-like state before inexplicably disappearing. Kevin decides to pursue the ice cream truck, after disturbing images and video clips of a panicked Iris received on his cellphone, encourage him to do so. As his pursuit continues, other videos and images download to various people's phones, causing them to become insane and violent in nature. A series of the video recordings responsible for the chaos are revealed. The first video, interspersed with an investigative documentary detailing the rapid fame of Dante the Great prior to his disappearance, show that the magician rose to fame with the help of a cloak that once belonged to Harry Houdini, that is powered by paganistic sacrifices of innocent life to a demonic entity. In the second video clip, a man named Alfonso develops a device that opens a portal to a parallel dimension, and trades places with his exact duplicate to document the new reality, only to horrifically discover that the primary religion is Satanism, and the people who live there have fanged demonic faces in place of their genitalia. The last video details a group of young aspiring skateboarders who are coaxed into traveling to Tijuana to film more stunts, by a filmmaker that intends to shoot a snuff film. As the group encounters a cult in Mexico, they are pursued by the ritualists, monstrous creatures, skeletons, and a demonic entity.

As Kevin and the police continues to chase after the truck, onlookers attempt to film the pursuit only to fall victim to hypnotism caused by the videos that are appearing on their cellular devices, and operatic music that begins to play. Upon viewing these images and falling into a dazed state, their noses begin to bleed and they commit violent acts. When he finally comes across the abandoned ice cream truck, he is greeted inside by a number of stacked televisions that play a live video of Iris instructing him to push a button labeled "Upload" where all of the videos from the VHS tapes, originally discovered by some petty thieves in an abandoned home, will be submitted to the internet. Though he initially declines citing the disturbing acts of those who watch them, Iris begins to mutilate herself insisting that he complete the request. Deciding to save her life, Kevin uploads the videos only for the video of his girlfriend continuing to mock him. Having completed the desires of the unknown threat from the previous two films, he exits the truck, and finds that Iris is laying against it and has been dead for some time. Removing her phone from her mouth, his nose begins to bleed, after viewing the screen that displays the various videos. With the world now victim to viewing these clips, thousands are now committing horrific crimes, implying that all hope is lost.

Exclusive to home video release of the film, a post-credits scene that is not found-footage in style like the rest of the V/H/S segments, shows that a covert operation is investigating the serial killer who is perhaps responsible for the events of each film.

==== V/H/S/94 (2021) ====
At a warehouse where cultist activities have been occurring, a SWAT team raids the building searching for the drugs and the originator of mass-suicides by its followers. They discover prison-like cells, with stacks of televisions playing disturbing segments sourced from a number of VHS tapes. As the team searches each room, the horrific videos begin to play, including: a news report detailing the urban legend cryptid known as the "Rat Man" who lives in the sewers, only to be attacked by sewer-dwelling people who worship the humanoid and bring the news crew to it for sacrifice; a recording of a wake ceremony that is held for a man who committed suicide, only for his body to reanimate and attack memorial worker during an intense storm; an Indonesian crazed scientist who conducts experiments on unwilling subjects, with intent to create a mechanical-human hybrid race that serve as his troops under his command through brainwashing them, only for one of his experiments to turn on his other creations while the police investigate the laboratory; and a domestic terrorist group who believe they will rid America of its sin, use a vampire for its blood which explodes in the sun with plans to demolish a government building, only for the monster to break free and attack each of them. One of the team members in the video is revealed to be a part of the SWAT team raiding the building, who helped get weapons to the terrorists.

The two remaining members of the SWAT team, tie him up and rebuke him for supplying an extremist group with weapons of war. One of the women questions what to do with him, as the other women of the compound explain that they create snuff videos of animal cruelty, cannibalism, disturbing acts of violence, and other horrific segments.

==== V/H/S/99 (2022) ====
In September 2021, producers announced that work has begun on the story for the next installment, while stating that whether it is green-lit depends on the success of V/H/S/94. In April 2022, Freddy Rodriguez stated on his social media profiles that he would be starring in a Shudder Exclusive Film tentatively titled "V/H/S/85". Rodriguez later deleted his post.

By July 2022, a sequel was confirmed officially titled V/H/S/99. The overarching plot will reportedly center around the final days of analog and the introduction of DVD media, and the paranoia surrounding Y2K. The anthology film will feature segments directed individually by Johannes Roberts, Vanessa & Joseph Winter, Maggie Levin, Tyler MacIntyre, and Steven "Flying Lotus" Ellison. Josh Goldbloom, Brad Miska, David Bruckner, Chad Villella, Matt Bettinelli-Olpin, Tyler Gillett, and James Harris will serve as producers. The project was developed as a joint-venture production between Bloody Disgusting, Cinepocalypse Productions, Radio Silence Productions, Studio71, and Shudder Original Films. The film was released exclusively on Shudder via streaming.

V/H/S/99 premiered at the 2022 Toronto International Film Festival on September 16, 2022, and was released on October 20, 2022.

==== V/H/S/85 (2023) ====
In April 2022, Freddy Rodriguez announced through his social media pages that he will star in an upcoming film titled V/H/S/85. By October of the same year at the New York Comic Con, the project was officially announced to be in production. Taking place during 1985, the segments will be directed by David Bruckner, Scott Derrickson, Gigi Saul Guerrero, Natasha Kermani, and Mike P. Nelson, respectively; while Josh Goldbloom, Brad Miska, David Bruckner, Chad Villella, Matt Bettinelli-Olpin, Tyler Gillett, and James Harris will serve as producers. The project will be a joint-venture production between Bloody Disgusting Films, Radio Silence Productions, Studio71, Cinepocalypse, and Shudder Original Films.

V/H/S/85 had its world premiere at Fantastic Fest on September 22, 2023, and was released on October 6, 2023, via streaming exclusively on Shudder.

==== V/H/S/Beyond (2024) ====
In October 2023 at the New York Comic Con, it was announced that a seventh V/H/S was in development. Each of the anthology segments is sci-fi oriented in the vein of other horror franchise sequels set in outer space such as Jason X and Leprechaun 4: In Space. Josh Goldbloom, Brad Miska, and James Harris served as producers. The project is a joint-venture production between Shudder Original Films, Bloody Disgusting, Cinepocalypse, and Studio71.

In July 2024, Bloody Disgusting announced the film is officially titled V/H/S/Beyond. The directors for segments include: Jordan Downey, Christian & Justin Long, Justin Martinez, Virat Pal, Kate Siegel and Jay Cheel. Michael Schreiber was announced at this time as an additional producer on the project.

V/H/S/Beyond had its world premiere at Fantastic Fest on September 20, 2024, prior to releasing on October 4, 2024, via streaming exclusively on Shudder.

==== V/H/S/Halloween (2025) ====
In October 2024 at the New York Comic Con, it was announced that an eighth film titled V/H/S/8 was in development, set to come out in 2025.

In July 2025, it was revealed by Bloody Disgusting that the new installment in the long-running franchise will officially be titled V/H/S/Halloween. It will include six new Halloween-themed segments directed by Bryan M. Ferguson (Pumpkin Guts), Casper Kelly (Too Many Cooks), Micheline Pitt-Norman & R.H. Norman (Grummy), Alex Ross Perry (Her Smell), Paco Plaza (Rec), and Anna Zlokovic (Appendage).

V/H/S/Halloween had its world premiere at Fantastic Fest on September 19, 2025, before being released on October 3, 2025, via streaming exclusively on Shudder.

==== V/H/S/Mixtape (2026) ====
In August 2026, it was announced that a ninth film titled V/H/S/Mixtape is set to release on October 9, 2026. Shudder announced that the film's streaming premiere takes place on that date during their Season of Screams horror movie marathon. The movie's segments are directed by filmmakers Ernest Dickerson, Renee Zhan & David Moreau, rapper RZA, musician Flying Lotus, and Swedish musician Tobias Forge. Each segment explores the use of music, rhythm and audio as elements of horror.

V/H/S/Mixtape had its world premiere at Beyond Fest on September 30, 2026, and was released by Shudder on October 9, 2026.

==== V/H/S: SCP (2027) ====
In July 2026, it was announced that a tenth film titled V/H/S: SCP, was in development, set to release in 2027. Roy Lee, Steven Schneider, Josh Goldbloom and Michael Schreiber would serve as producers. The film will be an adaptation of the internet project SCP Foundation and will feature segments documenting encounters with various SCPs. The film was picked up for distribution by A24 in September 2026. The SCP Wiki subsequently released a statement that they had not been contacted about the film, nor had anyone involved in the project responded to any attempts at communication. The SCP project is released under CC BY-SA 3.0, a copyleft license which permits derivative works to be produced, but requires that such works attribute the original authors and not hinder nor disallow others from redistributing them. In an article for The A.V. Club, William Hughes noted that the license would permit others to freely reupload or redistribute V/H/S: SCP without permission from A24 on streaming sites or video sharing services such as YouTube. Despite this, a report in Deadline asserted that the company had "worldwide rights" to distribute the film, a notion the SCP Wiki disputed.

=== Spin-off films ===
==== Siren (2016) ====
A feature-length adaptation and continuation of the "Amateur Night" segment from V/H/S, the plot of the film includes:

Jonah and his groomsmen plan a wild night of debaucherously clubbing activities for his bachelor party, one week prior to his wedding day. Organized by his irresponsible brother, Mac, and their best friends, the group finds themselves at a rundown uneventful strip club. After finding that Jonah is not happy, Mac hears of an underground club. Convincing his brother to go, the group drives through the night for an extended amount of time. Upon arriving at the location, they are all unnerved by the events inside the building and its patrons. Just as they're about to leave, the owner greets them and promises them a night they'll never forget, allowing each of them their own room. Because Jonah doesn't want any sexual encounters, he is given a room with a mysterious woman dancer named Lilith, chained up and behind glass. In conversing with her, he is convinced that she is an enslaved sex worker, and determines to break her out of the establishment. Working with his brother and friends, they escape the advances of security and free the woman.

As they drive away, they begin to realize that Lilith is not the timid and frail woman she seemed to be, but is instead a terrifying creature from Greek mythology known as a siren, who will stop at nothing to claim her prey and take possession of Jonah.

==== Kids vs. Aliens (2022) ====
A feature-length adaptation of the "Slumber Party Alien Abduction" segment of V/H/S/2, that was directed and co-written and edited by Jason Eisener. The filmmaker once again served as director from a script he co-wrote once again with John Davies; while Brad Miska, Josh Goldbloom, Jason Levangie, Marc Tetreault, and Rob Cotterill serve as producers. The plot is similar to the original segment, following two siblings who must overcome their differences on Halloween night when aliens attack while their parents are absent.

The project is a joint venture between Bloody Disgusting, Cinepocalypse Productions, Studio71, and Shudder Original Films. RLJE Films and Shudder served as distributors. Kids vs. Aliens had its premiere at Fantastic Fest 2022 on September 23, 2022. It was released exclusively via streaming on Shudder, on January 20, 2023. Eisener stated that there are tentative plans to make a sequel.

== Television ==
Title	U.S. release date	Episode	Director(s)	Screenwriter(s)	Producer(s)	Executive producers
V/H/S: Video Horror Shorts	October 28, 2018	Stray Dog	L. Gustavo Cooper	Ben Powell	David Lawson Jr.	Michael Schreiber, Adam Boorstin, Anjuli Hinds and Grant Desimone
V/H/S: Video Horror Shorts	October 29, 2018	Rearview Window	L. Gustavo Cooper	Ben Powell	David Lawson Jr.	Michael Schreiber, Adam Boorstin, Anjuli Hinds and Grant Desimone
V/H/S: Video Horror Shorts	October 30, 2018	The Nest	Ben Franklin & Anthony Melton		Ben Franklin and Anthony Melton	Michael Schreiber, Adam Boorstin, Anjuli Hinds and Grant Desimone
V/H/S: Video Horror Shorts	October 31, 2018	First Kiss	Emily Hagins		Ben Hanks and John Michael Simpson	Michael Schreiber, Adam Boorstin, Anjuli Hinds and Grant Desimone

A social media miniseries distributed exclusively to Snapchat, titled V/H/S: Video Horror Shorts, was released on October 28, 2018. Each episode detailed a different segment, similar to the videos depicted within the films.

- Stray Dog: Casey Gustavo is throwing a slumber party with her friends Soon and Marta when they find a stray dog outside whom they name Drake. After convincing Casey's parents if they can keep him, they discover that he does not like bright lights and hides while also displaying glowing yellow eyes. Casey gives him a bath, where he suddenly attacks her before disappearing. Soon and Marta check on Casey who is non-responsive and proceeds to eat everything in the fridge. Casey's father checks on her where she mutates into a Thing-esque monster who proceeds to attack and kill her parents and her friends.
  - Cast: Chloe Gonzales as Casey, Maytlin Pezzo as Soon, Sarah Glassman as Marta, Andi Wagner as Mom, Ric Olivera as Dad
- Rearview Window: While her mom goes out to get pain medication, Jasmine rests in the backseat of her car with a broken leg. She watches various people passing by and comments on them until she sees a man forcibly kidnapping a woman and placing her in his van. Having been spotted, Jasmine begins to panic and is unsure if she is hallucinating from her medication. Eventually, her mother returns, but just as she calms down, she transforms into the kidnapper who blocks out the camera.
  - Cast: Sidney Nicole Rogers as Jasmine, Stephanie Collins as Mom, Braydon Szafranski as the Kidnapper, Ted Elrick as Homeless Man, Sarah Lind as the Kidnapper's Victim, Sam Eidson as Scooter Man, Billy Gaggins as Burrito Man, Ashley Smith as Fighting Girl, Arthur Hinson as Fighting Guy
- The Nest: Lily follows her brother Rob and new girlfriend Jenna into the woods to spy on them, as Rob is apparently cheating with her. Lily begins to find strange things littering the woods and comes across a domicile made of sticks. Upon entering, she sees Jenna feeding Rob a black liquid, claiming that someone is making her do it. Strange entities suddenly arrive and take Rob away for a supposed sacrifice. Jenna claims that he is supposed to be the last one as a way to prevent herself from turning into them. Lily suddenly finds herself surrounded by more entities as she is attacked, presumably, by a now transformed Jenna.
  - Cast: Imogen Gurney as Lily, Samuel Woodhams as Rob, Mei Bignall as Jenna, Malik Ibheis as Stone Monster
- First Kiss: In the only non-found footage short, Drew and Allie get away from a party to have their first kiss with one another. Drew begins to notice some kind of ghostly being watching them that prevents him from kissing her. After hearing numerous noises and close calls, he leaves the room to tell the rest of the party goers to not interfere with him. He reenters and finds Allie calmly sitting on the side of the bed. As he leans in to kiss her, Allie suddenly enters to apologize and the two realize that the Allie on the bed is the ghost who lunges at Drew.
  - Cast: Jon Michael Simpson as Drew, Luxy Banner as Allie, Emmilee Price as the Ghost

The series' short-form format received positive reception, and praise for expanding the V/H/S premise into new territory.

== Recurring cast ==
List indicators

This section includes characters who will appear or have appeared in two or more installments in the franchise.

- An empty grey cell indicates the character was not in the film, or that the character's official presence has not yet been confirmed.
- ^{A} indicates an appearance through archival footage or audio.
- ^{C} indicates a cameo role.

Actor	Film series											Web series	Related films	
Actor	Original trilogy			Prequel trilogy			Standalone sequels			Spin-offs		V/H/S: Video Horror Shorts	Black Phone series	
Actor	V/H/S	V/H/S/2	V/H/S: Viral	V/H/S/94	V/H/S/99	V/H/S/85	V/H/S/Beyond	V/H/S/Halloween	V/H/S/Mixtape	Siren	Kids vs. Aliens	V/H/S: Video Horror Shorts	The Black Phone	Black Phone 2
Actor	2012	2013	2014	2021	2022	2023	2024	2025	2026	2016	2023	2018	2022	2025
Calvin Reeder	Gary	Gary^{A}												
Lane Hughes	Zack	Zack^{A}												
Kentucker Audley	Rox	Rox^{A}												
Adam Wingard	Brad	Herman Middleton	Herman Middleton^{A}											
Simon Barrett	Steve	Steve												
Hannah Fierman	Lilith "Lily"		Lilith "Lily"^{A}							Lilith "Lily"				
Kate Lyn Sheil	Stalker		Stalker^{A}											
Helen Rogers	Emily		Emily^{A}											
Epy Kusnandar		Father Malik	Father Malik^{A}											
Justin Welborn			Dante the Great							Mr. Nyx				
Stephen Caudill			SWAT Leader							Sheriff Boone				
Randy McDowell			Harry Houdini							Elliot				
Blair Redford			Himself^{C}							Himself^{C}				
Conor Sweeney				Himself^{C}	Himself^{A}									
Dashiell Derrickson					Chris Carbonara	Gunther Blake							Jackass 1^{C}	
James Ransone						Bobby Blake							Max	Max
Mike Ferguson							Farmer		Scary Guy					

== Additional crew and production details ==
Film	Segment	Crew/Detail					
Film	Segment	Composer(s)	Cinematographer(s)	Editor(s)	Production companies	Distributing companies	Running time
V/H/S	Tape 56	Lucas Clyde	Adam Wingard, Andrew Droz Palermo & Michael J. Wilson	Adam Wingard	Bloody Disgusting, 8383 Productions, Studio71, The Collective Studios, Wasteland Pictures, (Note: This studio is credited as a production company only on Tape 56.); Landing Site Productions (Note: This studio is credited as a production company only on Tuesday the 17th.)	Magnet Releasing	1 hr 56 mins
V/H/S	Amateur Night	Dan Dixon & Hilary Yarbrough	Victoria K. Warren	David Bruckner	Bloody Disgusting, 8383 Productions, Studio71, The Collective Studios, Wasteland Pictures, Landing Site Productions	Magnet Releasing	1 hr 56 mins
V/H/S	Second Honeymoon	Graham Reznick	Ti West	Ti West	Bloody Disgusting, 8383 Productions, Studio71, The Collective Studios, Wasteland Pictures, Landing Site Productions	Magnet Releasing	1 hr 56 mins
V/H/S	Tuesday the 17th	Kevin Duval & Doug Johnson	Eric Branco	Glenn McQuaid	Bloody Disgusting, 8383 Productions, Studio71, The Collective Studios, Wasteland Pictures, Landing Site Productions	Magnet Releasing	1 hr 56 mins
V/H/S	The Sick Thing That Happened to Emily When She Was Younger	Joe Swanberg & Adam Wingard	Adam Wingard	Joe Swanberg	Bloody Disgusting, 8383 Productions, Studio71, The Collective Studios, Wasteland Pictures, Landing Site Productions	Magnet Releasing	1 hr 56 mins
V/H/S	10/31/98	Lucas Clyde	Tyler Gillett & Justin Martinez	Matt Bettinelli-Olpin & Tyler Gillett	Bloody Disgusting, 8383 Productions, Studio71, The Collective Studios, Wasteland Pictures, Landing Site Productions	Magnet Releasing	1 hr 56 mins
V/H/S/2	Tape 49	Canaan Triplett	Tarin Anderson	Adam Wingard & David Geis	Bloody Disgusting, 8383 Productions LLC, Studio71, The Collective Studios, Snoot Entertainment, (Note: This studio is a credited production company on Tape 49, and Phase I Clinical Trials.); Haxan Films, (Note: This studio is credited as a production company only on A Ride in the Park.); PictureShow Productions LLC, (Note: This studio is credited as a production company only on A Ride in the Park.); Yer Dead Productions (Note: This studio is credited as a production company only on Slumber Party Alien Abduction.)	Magnet Releasing	1 hr 32 mins
V/H/S/2	Phase I Clinical Trials	Steve Moore	Seamus Tierney	Adam Wingard	Bloody Disgusting, 8383 Productions LLC, Studio71, The Collective Studios, Snoot Entertainment, Haxan Films, PictureShow Productions LLC, Yer Dead Productions	Magnet Releasing	1 hr 32 mins
V/H/S/2	A Ride in the Park	James Guymon	Stephen Scott	Eduardo Sánchez & Bob Rose	Bloody Disgusting, 8383 Productions LLC, Studio71, The Collective Studios, Snoot Entertainment, Haxan Films, PictureShow Productions LLC, Yer Dead Productions	Magnet Releasing	1 hr 32 mins
V/H/S/2	Safe Haven	Fajar Yuskemal & Aria Prayogi	Abdul Dermawan Habir	Gareth Huw Evans	Bloody Disgusting, 8383 Productions LLC, Studio71, The Collective Studios, Snoot Entertainment, Haxan Films, PictureShow Productions LLC, Yer Dead Productions	Magnet Releasing	1 hr 32 mins
V/H/S/2	Slumber Party Alien Abduction	Lucas Clyde	Jeff Wheaton	Jason Eisener	Bloody Disgusting, 8383 Productions LLC, Studio71, The Collective Studios, Snoot Entertainment, Haxan Films, PictureShow Productions LLC, Yer Dead Productions	Magnet Releasing	1 hr 32 mins
V/H/S: Viral	Vicious Circles	Canaan Triplett and Phillip Blackford	Harris Charalambous	Phillip Blackford	Bloody Disgusting, 8383 Productions LLC, Studio71, The Collective Studios, Crafty Apes, (Note: This studio is credited as a production company only on Vicious Circles.); Bishop Studios, (Note: This studio is credited as a production company only on Dante the Great.); Sayaka Producciones SL, (Note: This studio is credited as a production company only on Parallel Monsters.); AM Films LLC (Note: This studio is credited as a production company only on Bonestorm.)	Magnet Releasing	1 hr 21 mins
V/H/S: Viral	Dante the Great	Kristopher Carter	George Feucht	Gregg Bishop & Justin Dombush	Bloody Disgusting, 8383 Productions LLC, Studio71, The Collective Studios, Crafty Apes, Bishop Studios, Sayaka Producciones SL, AM Films LLC	Magnet Releasing	1 hr 21 mins
V/H/S: Viral	Parallel Monsters	Manuel "Anntona" Sánchez	Jon D. Domínguez	Víctor Berlín	Bloody Disgusting, 8383 Productions LLC, Studio71, The Collective Studios, Crafty Apes, Bishop Studios, Sayaka Producciones SL, AM Films LLC	Magnet Releasing	1 hr 21 mins
V/H/S: Viral	Bonestorm	Garret Morris	Aaron Moorhead	Michael Felker, Justin Benson & Aaron Moorhead	Bloody Disgusting, 8383 Productions LLC, Studio71, The Collective Studios, Crafty Apes, Bishop Studios, Sayaka Producciones SL, AM Films LLC	Magnet Releasing	1 hr 21 mins
V/H/S: Viral	Gorgeous Vortex	Joseph Bishara	Morgan Susser	Todd Lincoln	Bloody Disgusting, 8383 Productions LLC, Studio71, The Collective Studios, Crafty Apes, Bishop Studios, Sayaka Producciones SL, AM Films LLC	Magnet Releasing	1 hr 21 mins
Siren		Kristopher Carter	George Feucht	Gregg Bishop	Bloody Disgusting, Studio71, The Collective Studios, Big Picture Casting, Blue Falcon Productions, Chiller Films, Digital Bytes, G2	Universal Pictures	1 hr 22 mins
V/H/S: Video Horror Shorts	Stray Dog	Jeremy William Smith	William Sampson	Billy Gaggins & L. Gustavo Cooper	Studio 71, Indigo Development & Entertainment Arts, Snapchat Originals	Snapchat	16 mins
V/H/S: Video Horror Shorts	Rearview Window	Jeremy William Smith	William Sampson	Billy Gaggins & L. Gustavo Cooper	Studio 71, Indigo Development & Entertainment Arts, Snapchat Originals	Snapchat	16 mins
V/H/S: Video Horror Shorts	The Nest	Jeremy William Smith	Jonny Franklin	Ben Franklin & Anthony Melton	Studio 71, Indigo Development & Entertainment Arts, Snapchat Originals	Snapchat	16 mins
V/H/S: Video Horror Shorts	First Kiss	Jeremy William Smith	Dustin Supencheck	Paul Ganfernsman	Studio 71, Indigo Development & Entertainment Arts, Snapchat Originals	Snapchat	16 mins
V/H/S/94	Holy Hell	Greg Anderson	Andrew Appelle	Thom Newell & James Vandewater	Bloody Disgusting, Radio Silence Productions, Cinepocalypse Productions, Studio71, Raven Banner Entertainment, Shudder Original Films	Shudder	1 hr 43 mins
V/H/S/94	Storm Drain	Greg Anderson	Andrew Appelle	Thom Newell & James Vandewater	Bloody Disgusting, Radio Silence Productions, Cinepocalypse Productions, Studio71, Raven Banner Entertainment, Shudder Original Films	Shudder	1 hr 43 mins
V/H/S/94	The Veggie Masher	Greg Anderson	Andrew Appelle	Thom Newell & James Vandewater	Bloody Disgusting, Radio Silence Productions, Cinepocalypse Productions, Studio71, Raven Banner Entertainment, Shudder Original Films	Shudder	1 hr 43 mins
V/H/S/94	The Empty Wake	Greg Anderson	Andrew Appelle	Thom Newell & James Vandewater	Bloody Disgusting, Radio Silence Productions, Cinepocalypse Productions, Studio71, Raven Banner Entertainment, Shudder Original Films	Shudder	1 hr 43 mins
V/H/S/94	The Subject	Greg Anderson	Andrew Appelle	Thom Newell & James Vandewater	Bloody Disgusting, Radio Silence Productions, Cinepocalypse Productions, Studio71, Raven Banner Entertainment, Shudder Original Films	Shudder	1 hr 43 mins
V/H/S/94	Terror	Greg Anderson	Benjamin Kitchens	Brett W. Bachman	Bloody Disgusting, Radio Silence Productions, Cinepocalypse Productions, Studio71, Raven Banner Entertainment, Shudder Original Films	Shudder	1 hr 43 mins
V/H/S/99	Shredding	Keeley Bumford Dresage	Alex Choonoo	Andy Holton	Bloody Disgusting, Radio Silence Productions, Cinepocalypse Productions, Studio71, Shudder Original Films, Cook Filmworks, (Note: This studio is credited as a production company only on To Hell and Back.); Winterspectre Entertainment (Note: This studio is credited as a production company only on To Hell and Back.)	Shudder	1 hr 49 mins
V/H/S/99	Suicide Bid	Stick Men	Alexander Chinnici	Thom Newell	Bloody Disgusting, Radio Silence Productions, Cinepocalypse Productions, Studio71, Shudder Original Films, Cook Filmworks, Winterspectre Entertainment	Shudder	1 hr 49 mins
V/H/S/99	Ozzy's Dungeon	Flying Lotus	Benjamin Kitchens	Thom Newell	Bloody Disgusting, Radio Silence Productions, Cinepocalypse Productions, Studio71, Shudder Original Films, Cook Filmworks, Winterspectre Entertainment	Shudder	1 hr 49 mins
V/H/S/99	The Gawkers	Oren Hadar & Russell L. Howard III	Nicholas Piatnik	Tyler MacIntyre	Bloody Disgusting, Radio Silence Productions, Cinepocalypse Productions, Studio71, Shudder Original Films, Cook Filmworks, Winterspectre Entertainment	Shudder	1 hr 49 mins
V/H/S/99	To Hell and Back	Matthew Wayne Hutchinson & Wilhelm Richard Wagner	Jared Cook	Joseph Winter & Vanessa Winter	Bloody Disgusting, Radio Silence Productions, Cinepocalypse Productions, Studio71, Shudder Original Films, Cook Filmworks, Winterspectre Entertainment	Shudder	1 hr 49 mins
Kids vs. Aliens		Andrew Gordon Macpherson	Mat Barkley	Jason Eisener	Bloody Disgusting, Yer Dead Productions, Shut Up & Colour Pictures, Cinepocalypse Productions, Studio71, Shudder Original Films	Shudder and RLJE Films	1 hr 15 mins
V/H/S/85	Total Copy	Stephen Lukach & Jeremy Zuckerman	Alexander Chinnici	Thom Newell	Bloody Disgusting, Radio Silence Productions, Cinepocalypse Productions, Studio71, Reserva Films, (Note: This studio is credited as a production company only on God of Death.); Shudder Original Films	Shudder	1 hr 51 mins
V/H/S/85	No Wake	Stephen Lukach & Jeremy Zuckerman	Nick Junkersfeld	Mike P. Nelson	Bloody Disgusting, Radio Silence Productions, Cinepocalypse Productions, Studio71, Reserva Films, Shudder Original Films	Shudder	1 hr 51 mins
V/H/S/85	God of Death	Blake Matthew	Luke Bramley	Gigi Saul Guerrero	Bloody Disgusting, Radio Silence Productions, Cinepocalypse Productions, Studio71, Reserva Films, Shudder Original Films	Shudder	1 hr 51 mins
V/H/S/85	TKNOGD	Stephen Lukach & Jeremy Zuckerman	Alexander Chinnici	Natasha Kermani	Bloody Disgusting, Radio Silence Productions, Cinepocalypse Productions, Studio71, Reserva Films, Shudder Original Films	Shudder	1 hr 51 mins
V/H/S/85	Ambrosia	Stephen Lukach & Jeremy Zuckerman	Nick Junkersfeld	Mike P. Nelson	Bloody Disgusting, Radio Silence Productions, Cinepocalypse Productions, Studio71, Reserva Films, Shudder Original Films	Shudder	1 hr 51 mins
V/H/S/85	Dreamkill	Atticus Derickson	Brett Jutkiewicz	Andy Holton	Bloody Disgusting, Radio Silence Productions, Cinepocalypse Productions, Studio71, Reserva Films, Shudder Original Films	Shudder	1 hr 51 mins
V/H/S/Beyond	Abduction/Adduction	Jay Cheel	Mike McLaughlin	Jay Cheel	Bloody Disgusting, Cinepocalypse Productions, Studio71, Image Nation Abu Dhabi, Spooky Pictures, Shudder Original Films	Shudder	1 hr 54 mins
V/H/S/Beyond	Stork	Nick Soole	Kevin Stewart	Jordan Downey	Bloody Disgusting, Cinepocalypse Productions, Studio71, Image Nation Abu Dhabi, Spooky Pictures, Shudder Original Films	Shudder	1 hr 54 mins
V/H/S/Beyond	Dream Girl	Prassanna Vishwanathan	Tapan Tashar Basu Isc	Tanya Chhabria	Bloody Disgusting, Cinepocalypse Productions, Studio71, Image Nation Abu Dhabi, Spooky Pictures, Shudder Original Films	Shudder	1 hr 54 mins
V/H/S/Beyond	Live and Let Dive	Tim Wright	Dan Marks	Ben Turner	Bloody Disgusting, Cinepocalypse Productions, Studio71, Image Nation Abu Dhabi, Spooky Pictures, Shudder Original Films	Shudder	1 hr 54 mins
V/H/S/Beyond	Fur Babies	Nnamdi Mbanugo	Alexander Chihnici	Thom Newell	Bloody Disgusting, Cinepocalypse Productions, Studio71, Image Nation Abu Dhabi, Spooky Pictures, Shudder Original Films	Shudder	1 hr 54 mins
V/H/S/Beyond	Stowaway	Jonathan Wales	Michael Fimognari	Emly Freund	Bloody Disgusting, Cinepocalypse Productions, Studio71, Image Nation Abu Dhabi, Spooky Pictures, Shudder Original Films	Shudder	1 hr 54 mins
V/H/S/Halloween	Diet Phantasma	Nick Chuba	Owen Laird	Bryan M. Ferguson	Bloody Disgusting, Cinepocalypse Productions, Studio71, Image Nation Abu Dhabi, Spooky Pictures, Speed Demon Productions, Shudder Original Films	Shudder	1 hr 55 mins
V/H/S/Halloween	Coochie Coochie Coo	Nick Chuba	Powell Robinson	Alex Familian	Bloody Disgusting, Cinepocalypse Productions, Studio71, Image Nation Abu Dhabi, Spooky Pictures, Speed Demon Productions, Shudder Original Films	Shudder	1 hr 55 mins
V/H/S/Halloween	Ut Supra Sic Infra	Nick Chuba	Adrián Hernández	David Gallart	Bloody Disgusting, Cinepocalypse Productions, Studio71, Image Nation Abu Dhabi, Spooky Pictures, Speed Demon Productions, Shudder Original Films	Shudder	1 hr 55 mins
V/H/S/Halloween	Fun Size	Nick Chuba	Daniel Marks	Phil Samson	Bloody Disgusting, Cinepocalypse Productions, Studio71, Image Nation Abu Dhabi, Spooky Pictures, Speed Demon Productions, Shudder Original Films	Shudder	1 hr 55 mins
V/H/S/Halloween	Kidprint	Nick Chuba	Robert Kolodny		Bloody Disgusting, Cinepocalypse Productions, Studio71, Image Nation Abu Dhabi, Spooky Pictures, Speed Demon Productions, Shudder Original Films	Shudder	1 hr 55 mins
V/H/S/Halloween	Home Haunt	Sean McDaniel	Robert Kolodny	R.H. Norman	Bloody Disgusting, Cinepocalypse Productions, Studio71, Image Nation Abu Dhabi, Spooky Pictures, Speed Demon Productions, Shudder Original Films	Shudder	1 hr 55 mins
V/H/S/Mixtape	Gwar is...	—N/a	—N/a	—N/a	Spooky Pictures, Image Nation Abu Dhabi, Be Afraid Media, Speed Demon Productions, Cinepocalypse Productions, Shudder Original Films	Shudder	1 hr 38 mins
V/H/S/Mixtape	Dance, Dance, Dance, Dance	Alex Geringas & Mike Himelstein	Kevin P. Stewart	Tom Newhel	Spooky Pictures, Image Nation Abu Dhabi, Be Afraid Media, Speed Demon Productions, Cinepocalypse Productions, Shudder Original Films	Shudder	1 hr 38 mins
V/H/S/Mixtape	Another Cabin	Flying Lotus	—N/a	—N/a	Spooky Pictures, Image Nation Abu Dhabi, Be Afraid Media, Speed Demon Productions, Cinepocalypse Productions, Shudder Original Films	Shudder	1 hr 38 mins
V/H/S/Mixtape	Heartbeat	Alex Geringas & Mike Himelstein	Kevin P. Stewart	Guillaume Houssais	Spooky Pictures, Image Nation Abu Dhabi, Be Afraid Media, Speed Demon Productions, Cinepocalypse Productions, Shudder Original Films	Shudder	1 hr 38 mins
V/H/S/Mixtape	The Music of Mr. Sze	Alex Geringas & Mike Himelstein	Patrick Murguia	Thom Newhell	Spooky Pictures, Image Nation Abu Dhabi, Be Afraid Media, Speed Demon Productions, Cinepocalypse Productions, Shudder Original Films	Shudder	1 hr 38 mins
V/H/S/Mixtape	Premature Burial	Tobias Forge	Crille Forsberg	Emil Klinta	Spooky Pictures, Image Nation Abu Dhabi, Be Afraid Media, Speed Demon Productions, Cinepocalypse Productions, Shudder Original Films	Shudder	1 hr 38 mins
V/H/S/Mixtape	Death Tone	Alex Geringas & Mike Himelstein	Sean McDaniel	Brad Besser	Spooky Pictures, Image Nation Abu Dhabi, Be Afraid Media, Speed Demon Productions, Cinepocalypse Productions, Shudder Original Films	Shudder	1 hr 38 mins

== Reception ==
=== Box office performance ===
Film	Box office gross			Ref.
Film	North America	Other territories	Worldwide	Ref.
V/H/S	$100,345	$1,843,942	$1,944,287	
V/H/S/2	$21,833	$783,741	$805,574	
V/H/S: Viral	$2,756	$79,653	$82,409	
Siren	Information not publicly available	—N/a	Information not publicly available	
V/H/S/94	—N/a	—N/a	—N/a	
V/H/S/99	—N/a	—N/a	—N/a	
Kids vs. Aliens	—N/a	—N/a	—N/a	
V/H/S/85	—N/a	—N/a	—N/a	
V/H/S/Beyond	—N/a	—N/a	—N/a	
V/H/S/Halloween	—N/a	—N/a	—N/a	
V/H/S/Mixtape	—N/a	—N/a	—N/a	
Totals	$124,934	$2,707,336	$2,832,270	

=== Critical and public response ===
The original film, V/H/S, received mixed reviews, but was praised for its implementation of found-footage filmmaking and diverse stories, and was a financial success. The next two films in the franchise were met with mixed to generally negative reviews, and were not as financially successful as the first. Though the second film, V/H/S/2, was a success with film critics, it did not earn as much at the box office as its predecessor. The third installment, V/H/S: Viral, was generally negatively received critically, and made even less at the box office than the previous film. Financial information has not been released for the remainder of the films in the franchise, but their critical reception has improved. The fourth film, V/H/S/94, received the most positive reviews of the franchise. The fifth film, V/H/S/99, received lower but still generally positive ratings. The sixth film, V/H/S/85, received generally positive reviews. The seventh film, V/H/S/Beyond, received generally positive reviews. The eighth film, V/H/S/Halloween, also received generally positive reviews. The ninth film, V/H/S/Mixtape, received mixed reviews.

Film	Rotten Tomatoes	Metacritic
V/H/S	56% (108 reviews)	54/100 (22 reviews)
V/H/S/2	71% (69 reviews)	49/100 (21 reviews)
V/H/S: Viral	34% (32 reviews)	38/100 (12 reviews)
Siren	65% (20 reviews)	54/100 (9 reviews)
V/H/S: Video Horror Shorts	—N/a	—N/a
V/H/S/94	90% (69 reviews)	63/100 (9 reviews)
V/H/S/99	75% (55 reviews)	58/100 (12 reviews)
Kids vs. Aliens	58% (40 reviews)	51/100 (8 reviews)
V/H/S/85	74% (53 reviews)	53/100 (5 reviews)
V/H/S/Beyond	90% (62 reviews)	65/100 (8 reviews)
V/H/S/Halloween	89% (64 reviews)	67/100 (12 reviews)
V/H/S/Mixtape	48% (31 reviews)	41/100 (7 reviews)
