= Steven Schneider =

American film producer

- Schneider in 2026
- Born: Steven Jay Schneider; January 25, 1974 (age 52); New York City, New York, U.S.
- Education: University of London
- Occupations: Film producer; author; critic

Steven Jay Schneider (born January 25, 1974) is an American film producer, author and former critic best known for his work in the horror genre. He is the founder of Room 101, Inc. and co-founded Spooky Pictures with Roy Lee. He is best known for his involvement in the Paranormal Activity and Insidious franchises, as well as producing the films Blair Witch (2016), Pet Sematary (2019), Watcher (2022), Late Night with the Devil (2023), Strange Darling (2023), The Plague (2025), The Long Walk (2025) and Hokum (2026).

== Education ==
Schneider went to Hunter College High School, and later received a master's degree in philosophy from the University of London.

== Career ==
Schneider gained prominence through his involvement in the Paranormal Activity franchise. Blumhouse Productions founder Jason Blum credits Schneider as the person who identified Paranormal Activity and brought the project to his attention. With Blum and Oren Peli, Schneider co-produced the horror film Insidious, which was made for $1.5 million and grossed over $100 million worldwide and spawned a franchise. Other films that Schneider produced include The Lords of Salem and Knock at the Cabin.

Schneider has focused on strategic production deals. In 2012, he partnered with co-producer Adi Shankar to sign a multi-year agreement with multinational entertainment company Entertainment One. In 2020, Schneider and Roy Lee co-founded the independent production company Spooky Pictures. Schneider later signed a multi-film production deal with Indian company Balaji Motion Pictures and genre label Dark Hell, focusing on Hindi-language thriller and horror projects.

Schneider has also authored several books specializing in horror cinema and film psychoanalysis.

== Filmography ==
Producer

- Insidious (2010)
- Paranormal Activity 3 (2011)
- The Bay (2012)
- Haunt (2013)
- Sx_Tape (2013)
- Wer (2013)
- Cooties (2014)
- The Houses October Built (2014)
- Acid Girls (2014)
- Lady of Csejte (2015)
- Intruders (2015)
- Blair Witch (2016)
- The Worthy (2016)
- The Tank (2017)
- The Houses October Built 2 (2017)
- Mara (2018)
- Pet Samatary (2019)
- Masquerade (2021)
- Watcher (2022)
- Late Night with the Devil (2023)
- Strange Darling (2023)
- Desert Road (2024)
- Ick (2024)
- The Plague (2025)
- The Long Walk (2025)
- V/H/S/Halloween (2025)
- The Vile (2025)
- Hokum (2026)
- The Liberation (2026)
- Company (2026)
- River (2026)
- What Happened to Doris? (2026)
- Pathetic Fallacy (2026)
- V/H/S/Mixtape (2026)
- Anything but Ghosts (2027)
- V/H/S: SCP (2027)
- The Shepherd (TBA)
- The Night House (TBA)
- The Punishing (TBA)
- Sundowning (TBA)
- Archangel (TBA)
- Menace (TBA)
- Watchful Eye (TBA)
- System (TBA)

Executive producer

- Paranormal Activity (2007)
- 100 Feet (2008)
- Paranormal Activity 2 (2010)
- Phase 7 (2010)
- The FP (2011)
- The Devil Inside (2012)
- The River (2012)
- The Tall Man (2012)
- The Lords of Salem (2012)
- Paranormal Activity 4 (2012)
- Pawn Shop Chronicles (2013)
- Insidious: Chapter 2 (2013)
- Paranormal Activity: The Marked Ones (2014)
- Flight 7500 (2014)
- Exeter (2015)
- Area 51 (2015)
- Insidious: Chapter 3 (2015)
- Visions (2015)
- Estranged (2015)
- The Visit (2015)
- Paranormal Activity: The Ghost Dimension (2015)
- The Unspoken (2015)
- Split (2016)
- Insidious: The Last Key (2018)
- Delirium (2018)
- Glass (2019)
- His House (2020)
- Old (2021)
- Paranormal Activity: Next of Kin (2021)
- Knock at the Cabin (2023)
- Insidious: The Red Door (2023)
- Dead Mail (2024)
- Trap (2024)
- V/H/S/Beyond (2024)
- Please Don't Feed the Children (2024)
- Em & Selma Go Griffin Hunting (2025)
- Undertone (2025)
- Dolly (2025)
- Silent Night, Deadly Night (2025)
- Violence (2025)
- Imposters (2026)
- Goody Goody (2026)
- Recluse (2026)
- Breeder (2026)
- Insidious: Out of the Further (2026)
- Subscriber (2026)
- Paranormal Activity (2027)
- Skeletons (2027)
- Blair Witch Project (2027)
- Halloween Store (TBA)
- Send a Scare (TBA)
- The Mannequin (TBA)

Documentary appearance

- Unknown Dimension: The Story of Paranormal Activity (2021)

== Bibliography ==
Year	Book title	Publisher
1994	1001 Movies You Must See Before You Die	Barron's Educational Series
2003	Underground U.S.A.: Filmmaking Beyond the Hollywood Canon (Alterimage)	WallFlower Press
2003	Fear Without Frontiers: Horror Cinema Across the Globe	Fab Pr
2003	Dark Thoughts: Philosophic Reflections on Cinematic Horror	Scarecrow Press
2004	Horror Film and Psychoanalysis: Freud's Worst Nightmare (Cambridge Studies in Film)	Cambridge University Press
2004	New Hollywood Violence (Inside Popular Film)	Manchester University Press
2005	Horror International (Contemporary Approaches to Film and Media Series)	Wayne State University Press
2005	Traditions in World Cinema	Edinburgh University Press
2005	1001 Movies: You Must See Before You Die	Cassell Illustrated
2005	1001 Movies You Must See Before You Die	B.E.S. Publishing
2007	501 Movie Directors: A Comprehensive Guide to the Greatest Filmmakers	B.E.S. Publishing
2007	501 Movie Stars: A Comprehensive Guide to the Greatest Screen Actors	B.E.S. Publishing
2008	501 Movie Stars	Cassell Illustrated
2008	Horror Cinema by Jonathan Penner	TASCHEN
2009	101 War Movies: You Must See Before You Die	Octopus Publishing Group
2009	101 Gangster Movies You Must See Before You Die	B.E.S. Publishing
2009	101 Horror Movies You Must See Before You Die	B.E.S. Publishing
2009	101 Science-Fiction Movies	Octopus Publishing Group
2009	Designing Fear: An Aesthetics of Cinematic Horror	Routledge
2010	101 Cult Movies You Must See Before You Die	B.E.S. Publishing
2010	101 Action Movies You Must See Before You Die	B.E.S. Publishing
2010	1001 Movies You Must See Before You Die 2010	Cassell Illustrated
2011	1001 Movies You Must See Before You Die 2011	Cassell Illustrated
2012	1001 Movies You Must See Before You Die 2012	Cassell Illustrated
2012	Horror Cinema by Jonathan Penner	TASCHEN
2013	101 Gangster Movies You Must See Before You Die (Chinese Edition)	Central Compilation & Translation Press
2013	101 Sci-Fi Movies You Must See Before You Die (Chinese Edition)	Central Compilation & Translation Press
2013	101 Horror Movies You Must See Before You Die (Chinese Edition)	Central Compilation & Translation Press
2013	101 Cult Movies You Must See Before You Die (Chinese Edition)	Central Compilation & Translation Press
2013	101 War Movies You Must See Before You Die (Chinese Edition)	Central Compilation & Translation Press
2013	101 Action Movies You Must See Before You Die (Chinese Edition)	Central Compilation & Translation Press
2014	1001 Movies You Must See Before You Die 2014	Cassell Illustrated
2015	1001 Movies You Must See Before You Die	B.E.S. Publishing
2016	101 Sci-Fi Movies You Must See Before You Die	Apple Press
2017	Horror Cinema	TASCHEN
2018	1001 Movies You Must See Before You Die	Pier 9
2019	1001 Movies You Must See Before You Die	B.E.S. Publishing
2019	100 European Horror Films (BFI Screen Guides)	British Film Institute
2019	1001 Movies You Must See Before You Die (Chinese Edition)	Central Compilation & Translation Press
2020	1001 Movies You Must See Before You Die (Updated for 2020)	B.E.S. Publishing
2021	1001 Movies You Must See Before You Die (Updated for 2021)	B.E.S. Publishing
