= Recluse (film) =

- Directed by: Henry Chaisson
- Written by: Henry Chaisson
- Produced by: Josh Lobo; Gillian Cooper; Alex Dandino; Henry Chaisson; Katharina Windemuth
- Starring: Sasha Frolova; Xander Berkeley
- Cinematography: Bryce Holden
- Edited by: Nik Voytas; Henry Chaisson
- Music by: Henry Chaisson
- Production companies: Spooky Pictures; Points North; Restricted Pictures
- Distributed by: Vertical
- Release date: June 4, 2026 (Tribeca Festival)
- Running time: 106 minutes
- Country: United States
- Language: English

Recluse is a 2026 American supernatural horror film written, directed, and co-edited by Henry Chaisson in his directorial debut. It stars Sasha Frolova and Xander Berkeley.

Recluse had its world premiere at the Tribeca Festival on June 4, 2026. The film is set to be released theatrically in the United States by Vertical.

== Premise ==
After being summoned back to her childhood home to care for her bedridden father, Joan must confront the unearthed demons of her family's past and contend with the home's dark, malevolent energy that is both unseen and, much to her horror, seen.

== Cast ==
- Sasha Frolova as Joan
- Xander Berkeley
- Toby Poser as Lydia
- Mia Vallet as Emily
- Kimball Farley
- Frankie Seratch

== Production ==
Principal photography had wrapped by June 2025, on a mystery horror thriller film titled Recluse by filmmaker Henry Chaisson. It starred Sasha Frolova, Xander Berkeley, Toby Poser, Mia Vallet, Kimball Farley, and Frankie Seratch. In April 2026, the first film was selected to screen at the Tribeca Festival. In May 2026, Steven Schneider joined the film as an executive producer under his Spooky Pictures banner prior to the film's festival premiere in June.

== Release ==
Recluse had its world premiere at the Tribeca Festival on June 4, 2026. The film is set to be released theatrically in the United States by Vertical.

== Reception ==
On the review aggregator website Rotten Tomatoes, 92% of 13 critics' reviews are positive, with an average rating of 7.0/10.
