= V/H/S/2 =

2013 film

- Theatrical release poster
- Directed by: Simon Barrett ("Tape 49"); Adam Wingard ("Phase I Clinical Trials"); Eduardo Sánchez and Gregg Hale ("A Ride in the Park"); Timo Tjahjanto and Gareth Huw Evans ("Safe Haven"); Jason Eisener ("Slumber Party Alien Abduction")
- Written by: Simon Barrett ("Tape 49" and "Phase I Clinical Trials"); Jamie Nash ("A Ride in the Park"); Timo Tjahjanto and Gareth Wuw Evans ("Safe Haven"); John Davies and Jason Eisener ("Slumber Party Alien Abduction")
- Produced by: Roxanne Benjamin; Gary Binkow; Brad Miska
- Starring: see below
- Cinematography: Tarin Anderson; Abdul Dermawan Habir; Stephen Scott; Seamus Tierney; Jeff Wheaton
- Edited by: Jason Eisener; Gareth Wuw Evans; David Geis; Bob Rose; Eduardo Sánchez; Adam Wingard
- Music by: James Guymon; Steve Moore; Aria Prayogi; Fajar Yuskemal
- Production companies: Bloody Disgusting; The Collective; Haxan Films
- Distributed by: Magnet Releasing
- Release dates: January 19, 2013 (Sundance); July 12, 2013 (United States)
- Running time: 92 minutes
- Countries: United States; Canada
- Languages: English; Indonesian
- Box office: $805,574

V/H/S/2 (originally titled S-VHS) is a 2013 found footage horror anthology film produced by Bloody Disgusting and Roxanne Benjamin. The sequel to V/H/S (2012) and the second installment in the V/H/S franchise, it comprises four found footage segments linked together by a fifth frame narrative. The film features a largely different group of directors: Jason Eisener, Gareth Huw Evans, Timo Tjahjanto, Eduardo Sánchez, and Gregg Hale, and franchise returnees Simon Barrett and Adam Wingard.

The film premiered at the 2013 Sundance Film Festival in January 2013, much like its predecessor, and was released on demand on June 6, 2013. It also made a limited theatrical release in the United States on July 12, 2013. A sequel, V/H/S: Viral, was released on October 23, 2014.

== Plot ==
The film is presented as an anthology of four short horror films, built into a frame narrative which acts as its own fifth short horror film. Each short film is linked together with the concept of found footage as each segment is from the VHS tapes that were found by Brad, Rox, Zak, and Gary. (Note: As depicted in V/H/S (2012).)

=== "Tape 49" (frame narrative) — Prologue ===
- Directed and written by Simon Barrett

The frame narrative focuses on private investigators Larry and Ayesha, who are requested, by the mother of college student Kyle, to investigate his recent disappearance. Upon entering Kyle's house, they find several televisions broadcasting white noise, several VHS tapes, and a laptop that contains footage of the criminal gang from the first film. There are also pictures on the wall of the old man from the previous film.

Ayesha discovers that the laptop is still recording as Larry tells her to watch the tapes, planning to inspect the house while she does so. Rewinding the laptop recording, Ayesha watches Kyle discuss the newest addition to his VHS tape collection, then puts a tape in the VCR to watch it, neglecting to notice a strange figure peering at her from the shadows.

=== "Phase I Clinical Trials" ===
- Directed by Adam Wingard
- Written by Simon Barrett

Herman Middleton is fitted with a cybernetic ocular implant after his right eye is lost in a car accident. The doctor informs Herman that he won't be able to turn the camera in the implant off because the company that constructed it is recording his data for research, and he may experience some "glitches" since the implant itself is still in its experimental stage. As Herman leaves the hospital, he notices a young woman staring at him intently.

After returning home, Herman plays video games, then goes to the kitchen for a cup of tea. He returns to find his game controller far from where he left it and his tea kettle suddenly drops to the floor. Herman also sees what appears to be a figure lying under his bed sheets; when he pulls the sheets back, the bed is empty. He looks up and comes face to face with a pale, bleeding man with a scowl on his face. Herman calls his doctor to address the problem until he sees the man again, this time with a similarly pale young girl.

After the pale people keep banging on his door, Herman is forced to sleep in the bathroom overnight. The next day, after observing the mess in his bedroom, the woman from the hospital visits him. She identifies herself as Clarissa and says that she is experiencing a similar situation. Once invited in, Clarissa explains to Herman that she was born deaf and had a cochlear implant installed in her ear, which gave her the ability to hear the frequencies of ghosts. Understanding what is been happening to him, Herman suggests removing his ocular implant, but Clarissa claims that doing so will only keep him from seeing the ghosts instead of getting rid of them.

Clarissa also explains that the ghosts will get more dangerous and powerful the longer one pays attention to them, just as an overweight, bloodied man appears behind her. Herman alerts her about his presence, but she already knows he is there and that he is her abusive uncle. Clarissa then has sex with Herman to divert his attention away from the ghosts. That night, Herman awakens to find the young girl in his bed and flees when she screams at him, before he witnesses Clarissa being dragged into the pool by an unseen force. She drowns despite his attempts to save her.

At his wit's end, Herman locks himself in the bathroom and uses a straight razor to cut out the ocular implant in a desperate attempt to escape from the ghosts. As Clarissa's ghost and her uncle appear behind him, Herman unwittingly runs into the now-invisible young girl and her father, who grabs the implant, still attached to the razor, and shoves it deep into Herman's throat, presumably killing him as the footage ends.

=== "Tape 49" — First interlude ===
Ayesha calls Larry into the room to discuss the tapes' legitimacy with him. He tells Ayesha to continue watching the tapes while Kyle's recording explains that the tapes must be watched in a proper order "to affect you". Ayesha fails to notice the figure in the hallway behind her as she puts another tape in the VCR.

=== "A Ride in the Park" ===
- Directed by Eduardo Sánchez and Gregg Hale
- Written by Jamie Nash

Shortly after answering a call from his girlfriend Amy, Mike Sullivan affixes a camera to his helmet and goes on a bike ride through the woods of a state park. He abruptly comes across a terrified, blood-covered woman who begs him to help her boyfriend before she begins vomiting blood. Mike sees several zombies approaching until the woman suddenly turns into a zombie herself. She tackles Mike and bites him on the throat before he bludgeons her to death with a rock.

Mike staggers through the woods, heavily bleeding, before he also vomits blood and dies, collapsing down a hill in the process. Two cyclists, a man and a woman, come across Mike's corpse and call emergency services, but Mike reanimates, kills the man, and bites the woman before she runs off into the woods. As Mike eats the man's body, the now-zombified woman returns and joins him until the man reanimates. The three zombies hear the noise of a young girl's birthday party and invade the festivities with the zombies that Mike saw earlier. They wind up killing several people, some of whom also reanimate.

Mike chases a father and his three daughters before he gets stabbed in the eye with a skewer by a guest, who barely manages to escape to his car just before Mike can attack him. As Mike sees his reflection in the car's window, appearing to lose his aggression, a man with a shotgun shoots him in the chest, managing to kill several more zombies before he is overwhelmed and eaten. Mike is then hit by a car and, as he falls, accidentally butt-dials Amy. Upon hearing her voice, Mike enters a semi-conscious state, then manages to regain his humanity. He takes the dead man's shotgun and takes his own life to avoid attacking and infecting anyone else. The camera flies off his head and lands next to his dead body as the footage ends.

=== "Tape 49" — Second interlude ===
Larry re-enters the room and finds Ayesha with a bloody nose, staring at the televisions in an apparently hypnotized state. When she is woken from her trance, she tells Larry that she has a migraine. Larry leaves to find some medicine as a seemingly-entranced Ayesha inserts another tape in the VCR, while the figure from earlier crawls out of the shadows and watches her.

=== "Safe Haven" ===
- Directed by Timo Tjahjanto and Gareth Huw Evans
- Written by Timo Tjahjanto and Gareth Huw Evans

A film crew—interviewer Malik, producer Lena (who is also Malik's fiancée), Malik's best friend Adam, and cameraman Joni—infiltrate Paradise Gates, a cult in Indonesia, to film a documentary about their mysterious activities with numerous hidden cameras. After persuading the cult's leader, a man referred to as "Father", to allow them access, they are invited inside the cult's compound by a woman known as "Madame". The crew finds the walls adorned with bizarre symbols, schoolchildren in classrooms, and women dressed in white garments.

During their interview with Father, Lena almost vomits and steps out. While he searches for a spare camera battery, Malik overhears a private conversation between Adam and Lena, in which the latter reveals that she is pregnant with Adam's child and has not told Malik. As Adam ditches Lena and explores the basement, he finds a woman strapped to a chair with her womb carved out. She awakens and begins screaming and convulsing, causing him to run away.

While Father is being interviewed by Joni, a bell chimes, to which the cult leader suddenly announces the "time of reckoning" over the intercom. After Joni repeatedly interrupts the announcement to ask what is happening, Father slits his throat with a box cutter, after which the cultists begin a mass suicide via poison and gunshots. Malik is apprehended and shot dead by the cultists and Lena is abducted by Madame and several women in surgical apparel. Adam follows them in an attempt to rescue Lena, until an explosion knocks him back. He watches a figure crawling across the ceiling and tries to enter the fiery room, only to be intercepted by Father, who is now covered in blood and has the cult's symbol inscribed on his body. Father tells him that "it has fulfilled" before exploding into a pile of blood and organs.

Adam finds Lena on an altar in the room ahead of him, with the same symbol carved into her skin. He kills Madame and the women holding Lena down, but is unable to save Lena herself before the demon the cult worships (which resembles Baphomet) tears its way out of her body. As he flees, Adam discovers that the cultists and schoolchildren, including Joni and Malik, have risen from the dead and turned into zombie-like ghouls, who proceed to attack Adam. Adam then fights his way through these ghouls, trying to escape while the demon chases after him along the way. He flees to the car and drives off, only to be rammed by the demon through the car's window and gravely injured.

Adam crawls out of the wreckage before the demon looks down on him. It calls him "Papa", revealing that it is actually his child. On hearing this revelation, Adam breaks down in hysterical laughter as the footage ends.

=== "Tape 49" — Third interlude ===
Larry returns with the medicine, only to discover that Ayesha is dead, having committed suicide with her gun. As he pleads for help, Larry finds a tape with the word "WATCH", written with lipstick, lying beside her. He nervously picks it up and puts it into the VCR.

=== "Slumber Party Alien Abduction" ===
- Directed by Jason Eisener
- Written by John Davies and Jason Eisener

Young brothers Gary and Randy attach a camera to their dog, Tank, to film videos at their large lakeside house. Their parents leave on a romantic getaway, so they invite their friends Shawn and Danny to harass their older sister Jen and her boyfriend Zack. While the quartet ambush Jen and Zack with urine-filled squirt guns at the lake, they fail to notice a grey alien hiding beneath the water.

That night, the quartet startle Jen and Zack during sex by blaring loud music and flashing lights. A deafening noise is heard, but no one notices it as Zack gives chase. In retaliation, Jen attaches another camera to Tank and sends him into the living room to catch Randy masturbating to a pornographic film. The deafening noise is heard again as the power goes out. Zack grabs Jen's father's shotgun after he sees figures outside the house, but is suddenly abducted by an alien, along with others of its kind.

The aliens attack the group and seal them in their sleeping bags, throwing them into the lake in an attempt to drown them. While Shawn and Danny are either abducted or drowned, Randy and Jen manage to resuscitate Gary and run into the woods with Tank. After Tank inadvertently alerts the aliens to their position through his barks, the group run toward what they believe to be a group of police sirens, which turns out to be a trap set by the aliens, who abduct Randy.

Gary, Jen, and Tank flee to a nearby barn, where Jen is also abducted as she helps Gary and Tank escape up a ladder. As the aliens close in on them, Gary is suddenly pulled into the air by the tractor beam of their ship. Unable to hold on to Tank's leash, Gary ends up abducted while the dog falls to the ground. Mortally injured and unable to move, Tank slowly dies as the footage ends.

=== "Tape 49" — Epilogue ===
The unnerved Larry watches the laptop recording, where Kyle explains that he and his mother want to make their own tape. Kyle then shoots himself in an on-camera suicide attempt, shattering his jaw but ultimately surviving, and runs off moments before Larry and Ayesha arrive. As Larry tries to leave, an undead Ayesha suddenly rises and attacks him.

In self-defense, Larry breaks her neck and rushes into another room while Ayesha chases after him on all fours. Larry hides in a closet and shoots Ayesha in the head when she finds him. Hearing a strange gurgling sound, Larry discovers that Kyle has been hiding in the same closet. Kyle promptly lunges at Larry and strangles him to death, giving a thumbs up to the camera before turning it off.

== Cast ==
=== "Tape 49" ===
- Lawrence Michael Levine as Larry
- Kelsy Abbott as Ayesha
- L.C. Holt as Kyle
- Simon Barrett as Steve
- Mindy Robinson as Tabitha

=== "Phase I Clinical Trials" ===
- Adam Wingard as Herman Middleton
- Hannah Hughes as Clarissa
- John T. Woods as Dr. Fleischer
- Corrie Lynn Fitzpatrick as Young Girl
- Brian Udovich as Bloody Man
- John Karyus as Uncle
- Casey Adams as Justin

=== "A Ride in the Park" ===
- Jay Saunders as Mike
- Bette Cassatt as Screaming Girl
- Dave Coyne as Good Samaritan Guy
- Wendy Donigian as Good Samaritan Girl
- Devon Brookshire as Amy

=== "Safe Haven" ===
- Fachri Albar as Adam
- Hannah Al Rashid as Lena
- Oka Antara as Malik
- Andrew Suleiman as Joni
- Epy Kusnandar as Father
- R.R. Pinurti as Ibu Sri

=== "Slumber Party Alien Abduction" ===
- Rylan Logan as Gary
- Samantha Gracie as Jen
- Cohen King as Randy
- Zach Ford as Shawn
- Josh Ingraham as Danny
- Jeremie Saunders as Zack
- Riley Eisener as Tank

== Production and release ==
For the first short, originally the part had been written with James Rolfe in mind, but had to decline due to working on Angry Video Game Nerd: The Movie. The film was rushed into production in late 2012, and premiered on January 19, 2013, at Park City's Library Center Theatre as part of the 2013 Sundance Film Festival, much like its predecessor.

The film was released via VOD on June 6, and theatrically on July 12. Dance punk band The Death Set recorded a song, "6 Different Ways To Die", for the film's credits.

== Reception ==
On the review aggregator website Rotten Tomatoes, 70% of 66 critics' reviews are positive, with an average rating of 6.2/10. The website's consensus reads: "It's as scattershot as its predecessor, but V/H/S/2 rounds up enough horror filmmaking talent to deliver a satisfyingly nasty — albeit uneven — dose of gore." Metacritic, which uses a weighted average, assigned the film a score of 49 out of 100, based on 21 critics, indicating "mixed or average" reviews.

Borys Kit of The Hollywood Reporter wrote, "The scares are as hit-or-miss as the filmmaking". Dennis Harvey of Variety called it "rip-roaring good time for genre fans".

On July 10, 2013, Rex Reed was the subject of controversy due to a scathing review, in which he admitted having walked out at the end of the first segment. His review criticizes parts of the film that happened after he supposedly walked out, but his references are imprecise. For example, he describes segment Slumber Party Alien Abduction as "a sleepover invaded by psycho kidnappers [as opposed to aliens] told from the perspective of a GoPro camera attached to the back of a dog" or summarizing segment A Ride in the Park as the tale of "a mountain biker pursued by flesh-eating zombies [rather than turned into one himself early on]".

== Sequel ==
A third installment in the series, titled V/H/S: Viral, was released in the United States on October 23, 2014.

== See also ==
- Kids vs. Aliens, a spin-off film of the Slumber Party Alien Abduction segment
- List of films featuring extraterrestrials
- List of ghost films
