= Strange Darling =

2023 American thriller film by JT Mollner

- Theatrical release poster
- Directed by: JT Mollner
- Written by: JT Mollner
- Produced by: Bill Block; Chris Ivan Cevic; Roy Lee; Giovanni Ribisi; Steven Schneider
- Starring: Willa Fitzgerald; Kyle Gallner; Madisen Beaty; Steven Michael Quezada; Ed Begley Jr.; Barbara Hershey
- Cinematography: Giovanni Ribisi
- Edited by: Christopher Robin Bell
- Music by: Craig DeLeon
- Production companies: Miramax; Spooky Pictures
- Distributed by: Magenta Light Studios
- Release dates: September 22, 2023 (Fantastic Fest); August 23, 2024 (United States)
- Running time: 96 minutes
- Country: United States
- Language: English
- Budget: $4–10 million
- Box office: $4.8 million

Strange Darling is a 2023 American psychological crime thriller film written and directed by JT Mollner. The film stars Willa Fitzgerald, Kyle Gallner, Madisen Beaty, Steven Michael Quezada, Ed Begley Jr., and Barbara Hershey. Set in rural Oregon, it follows a man (Gallner) and woman (Fitzgerald) who have a one-night stand that devolves into a cat-and-mouse game of murder. It is divided into six chapters in nonlinear order.

Principal photography began in Portland, Oregon on August 22, 2022, and concluded on October 1. The film marked the cinematographic debut of Giovanni Ribisi, who also served as one of the producers, and was shot on 35 mm film.

Strange Darling premiered at Fantastic Fest on September 22, 2023, and was theatrically released in the United States on August 23, 2024. The film received positive reviews from critics, with particular praise for the cinematography and the performances of the cast. Despite this, it was a box office failure, grossing $4.8 million against its $4–10 million production budget.

== Plot ==
The film's structure is non-linear, but this plot summary is written in a linear fashion. The order of the chapters as shown in the film is Chapter 3, 5, 1, 4, 2, 6, and then the Epilogue.

Chapter 1: "Mister Snuffle" — In rural Hood River County, Oregon, a woman ("the Lady") meets a man ("the Demon") and the two go to a local motel to have sex. Prior to renting a room, the Lady explains to the Demon the risks women take engaging in such behavior, and makes him answer whether or not he is a serial killer. After he says no, the Lady agrees to proceed, and asks that she and the Demon engage in hyper-realistic sadomasochistic roleplay in which he pretends to be a murderer, and she his victim.

Chapter 2: "Do You Like to Party?" — After hours of roleplaying, the Lady insists the two use cocaine before having sex, to which the Demon agrees. When the Lady begins acting cold and denies the Demon sex, she reveals that she has in fact dosed him with ketamine, which renders him severely sedated.

The Lady is revealed to be a prolific serial killer dubbed "the Electric Lady" by the media. She then carves the initials 'E.L.' into the Demon's chest. While rifling through his belongings, she discovers a law enforcement badge, revealing that he is a police officer. The Lady prepares to stab the Demon to death, but as he regains his faculties, he shoots her ear off with his concealed pistol (presumably retrieved while she was in the bathroom). The Lady flees the motel in a stolen car after stabbing the desk clerk to death, and is pursued by the Demon in his truck.

Chapter 3: "Can You Help Me? Please?" — On a rural stretch of road, he shoots at the vehicle, causing her to crash and flee on foot into the woods. The Lady stumbles upon the farmhouse of two eccentric hippie doomsday preppers, Frederick and Genevieve, who take her in.

Chapter 4: "The Mountain People" — While Genevieve goes to retrieve medicine for the Lady, Frederick attempts to phone the police, but the Lady stabs him to death and forces Genevieve outside. The Demon arrives on the property with his rifle. Genevieve seizes the opportunity to flee into the woods, while the Lady retreats back into the farmhouse and hides in a chest freezer.

Chapter 5: "Here, Kitty, Kitty ..." — The Demon begins searching the house, shooting into objects where he thinks the Lady might be hiding, tauntingly calling out "Here, Kitty, Kitty". He eventually finds her and shoots through the ice chest, wounding her arm.

Chapter 6: "Who's Gary Gilmore?" — The Demon handcuffs her to the chest before calling fellow sheriff Pete and his deputy, Gale, for backup. The Lady tells the Demon she had always hoped to die like Gary Gilmore, and tearfully confesses that, during their earlier sexual encounter, she felt a fleeting moment of true love for him. She then sprays him with a can of Genevieve's bear spray. A struggle ensues during which the Lady bites into the Demon's neck, tearing into his carotid artery, causing him to bleed to death. As he dies, she steals his concealed pistol.

Pete and Gale arrive at the house, and find the Lady lying handcuffed to the freezer with her pants pulled down. She claims the Demon, high on cocaine, kidnapped her and took her to the farmhouse to rape and murder her, unaware that the home was occupied. Pete is skeptical of the scene and insists that the homicide unit investigate before they free her, but Gale convinces him that the Lady should receive immediate medical attention. As the officers escort the Lady by car toward town, Genevieve appears along the road and flags them down, but the Lady shoots her before she can explain what happened. The Lady then confiscates both of their guns before ordering Gale out of the car.

Epilogue: "The Electric Lady" — Pete drives the Lady until she has him stop so she can consider her next move. When Pete asks her why she kills, she tells him that, "Sometimes, I don't see humans; I see devils." The Lady then kills Pete. The Lady stumbles farther down the road, when another woman driving a truck picks her up. Gazing at the sideview mirror, the Lady sees a brief flash of "a devil" in her own reflection. When the Lady draws her pistol, the driver quickly fires first, shooting the Lady. The driver calls police from her cell phone, explaining she just shot a stranger in self-defense and that she is en route to the local hospital. The Lady (who begins convulsing from the gunshot) looks on until she loses consciousness and dies.

== Cast ==
- Willa Fitzgerald as the Lady
- Kyle Gallner as the Demon
- Madisen Beaty as Gale
- Bianca Santos as Tanya
- Steven Michael Quezada as Pete
- Ed Begley Jr. as Frederick
- Barbara Hershey as Genevieve
- Denise Grayson as Libby
- Eugenia Kuzmina as Beth
- Sheri Foster Blake as the driver
- Andrew Segal as Steve
- Jason Patric as true crime narrator (voice)
- Giovanni Ribisi as Art Pallone (voice)

== Screenplay ==
Writer-director JT Mollner conceived of Strange Darling in 2021 as the film industry began to emerge from the COVID-19 pandemic. Within six months, he had completed the script and begun shooting, making it the fastest film production process he had ever experienced. Mollner described the writing process as the easiest he had encountered in his career. He explained that this screenplay "kind of wrote itself," attributing its fluidity to the extensive time he had spent conceptualizing the project prior to writing.

Elaborating on the concept, Mollner stated: "I was drawn to the image of this final girl running through the woods. And I kept seeing that, and I knew it was a trope, except the way I saw it was there was dressing on the image that I saw, that that made it unique to me, the scrubs and the music and the frame rate, the slow motion I wanted to shoot, and the lens. I had this very stylized image in my head, but I wanted to make sure, beyond just style, there was some story here, or a unique side of a character we could show that we hadn't seen in other films, not just horror films, but films about people who are being pursued or in distress."

Upon completion of the script, Mollner received three different offers from various companies. They met with Miramax first, where Mollner recalled, "In the room at Miramax, I was about three minutes into my pitch and Bill Block said, 'We're making it. It's done. Don't talk to anybody else.'" About three or four weeks later, the casting process commenced.

The film's chapterized structure was designed to captivate audiences and maintain intrigue. Mollner believed that this narrative approach would appeal not only to those familiar with the script but also to new viewers, as it encourages curiosity about the unfolding story: "The reveals of the chapterized structure immediately draw you in. I assume that it also had an appeal to a stranger who would pick up this script and say, 'I want to know what happens next.'"

The director has neither confirmed nor denied if the film is based on real events, saying "perhaps" it is. However, at the end of the credits there is the standard text: "The characters and events depicted in this photoplay are fictitious. Any similarity to actual persons, living or dead, is purely coincidental."

== Production ==
On September 27, 2022, Deadline Hollywood reported that the film was shooting in Portland, Oregon. The film was produced by Bill Block, Steve Schneider, and Roy Lee, with cinematography by Giovanni Ribisi (who made his feature-length cinematographic debut on this film). Ribisi is also credited as a producer (as he donated his own personal equipment to the film production) and has a cameo. He used 35 mm film for the shooting.

The production spanned 32 days and operated on a budget between $4–10 million, with some scenes shot in the Mount Hood National Forest.

The production faced significant challenges, shutting down two days into filming due to negative feedback from film executives, who stated “we hate everything about what you're sending us. We're not enjoying this at all. And we're not sure if this is going to work.” Executives also asked that Willa Fitzgerald be recast. Mollner described this experience as “traumatic,” fearing that a permanent shutdown would jeopardize his future prospects as a filmmaker. Producers Lee and Schneider argued that the financiers resume production, stressing that millions had already been spent and that “We're either going to do [the movie] this way or not do the movie at all.” Due to the almost week-long shutdown during filming and resulting budgetary constraints, a major river set piece was cut.

After filming wrapped, tensions continued over the film's non-linear narrative structure. Without Mollner's knowledge, Miramax hired another editor to recut the film as a linear story. Mollner told Miramax CEO Bill Block that he would have his name removed from the film if it were released in sequence and even went as far as to remove it during his own cut of the test screening. Tiffany Haddish, an acquaintance of Mollner, viewed an early cut of his version and also argued that Block accept Mollner's version.

In accordance with his contract, Mollner was granted a test screening of his cut. Following a highly successful audience response, Block ultimately granted Mollner the final cut and later apologized to Mollner for the difficult production.

== Release ==
The film had its world premiere on September 22, 2023, at Fantastic Fest held in Austin, Texas. In March 2024, Magenta Light Studios acquired North American distribution rights to the film.

An early access screening took place at select U.S. theaters on August 14, 2024, followed by an exclusive live-streamed Q&A session from the AMC Lincoln Square 13 Theater with writer-director Mollner, cinematographer Ribisi, and star Fitzgerald, moderated by Carla Gugino. The film opened in Australia on August 22, 2024, followed by a wide U.S. theatrical release on 1,133 screens on August 23, 2024.

Strange Darling was released on VOD on October 1, 2024, via STX Entertainment.

== Reception ==
=== Box office ===
As of January 18, 2025, the film has grossed $4.9 million worldwide. In the United States and Canada, it earned $1.1 million from 1,135 theaters in its opening weekend.

=== Critical response ===
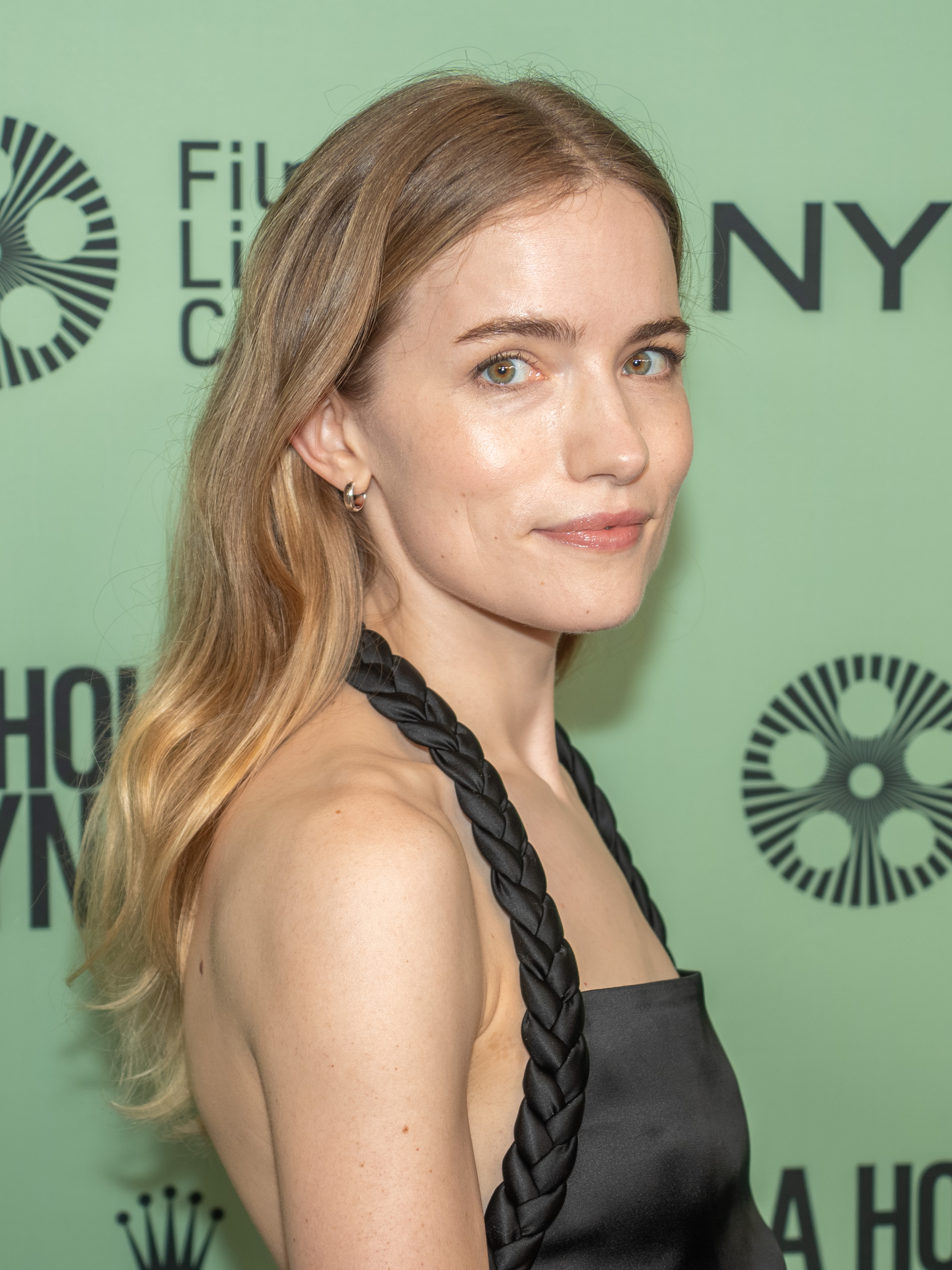
Willa Fitzgerald received widespread praise for her performance as "the Lady".

On the review aggregator website Rotten Tomatoes, 95% of 155 critics' reviews are positive, with an average rating of 8/10. The website's consensus reads: "JT Mollner delivers a thrillingly unexpected and electric ride with two breakout performances by Willa Fitzgerald and Kyle Gallner in Strange Darling." Metacritic, which uses a weighted average, assigned the film a score of 80 out of 100, based on 23 critics, indicating "generally favorable" reviews.

Thomas Floyd of The Washington Post praised the film's performances and Ribisi's cinematography. Jeannette Catsoulis of The New York Times similarly praised the film, writing:

Playing out in six, ingeniously scrambled chapters, this headlong thriller transforms a simple cat-and-mouse premise—and maybe even a toxic love story—into an impertinent rebuke to genre clichés and our own preprogrammed assumptions.

IndieWire's Alison Foreman awarded the film an A rating, concluding:

Electric and unforgettable, Strange Darling lives up to its maddening moniker. In a summer movie season that’s been middling at best, this is a must-see—a feat of filmmaking so extraordinary you’ll wonder if it could ever truly be spoiled.

American filmmaker J. J. Abrams stated:

Name a better movie this year. It’s terrifying, hilarious, heartbreaking, sexy, and wild. A true cinematic thriller masterpiece. I lost my mind for Strange Darling.

=== Accolades ===
Award	Date of ceremony	Category	Nominee(s)	Result	Ref.
Seattle Film Critics Society	December 16, 2024	Achievement in Pacific Northwest Filmmaking	Strange Darling	Nominated	
Saturn Awards	February 2, 2025	Best Thriller Film	Strange Darling	Won	
Saturn Awards	February 2, 2025	Best Film Direction	JT Mollner	Nominated	
Saturn Awards	February 2, 2025	Best Film Writing	JT Mollner	Nominated	
Saturn Awards	February 2, 2025	Best Actor in a Film	Kyle Gallner	Nominated	
Saturn Awards	February 2, 2025	Best Actress in a Film	Willa Fitzgerald	Nominated	
Saturn Awards	February 2, 2025	Best Supporting Actress in a Film	Barbara Hershey	Nominated	
Saturn Awards	February 2, 2025	Best Film Editing	Christopher Robin Bell	Nominated	
