= Kids vs. Aliens =

2022 film by Jason Eisener

- Theatrical release poster
- Directed by: Jason Eisener
- Written by: John Davies; Jason Eisener
- Produced by: Josh Goldbloom; Brad Miska; Jason Levangie; Marc Tetreault; Rob Cotterill
- Starring: Dominic Mariche; Phoebe Rex; Calem MacDonald; Asher Grayson
- Cinematography: Mat Barkley
- Edited by: Jason Eisener
- Music by: Andrew Gordon Macpherson
- Production companies: Cinepocalypse Productions; Bloody Disgusting; Shut Up & Colour Pictures; Yer Dead Productions; Studio71
- Distributed by: RLJE Films; Shudder
- Release dates: September 23, 2022 (Fantastic Fest); January 20, 2023 (United States)
- Running time: 75 minutes
- Country: United States
- Language: English

Kids vs. Aliens is a 2022 American science fiction horror film directed and edited by Jason Eisener and written by John Davies and Eisener. It is the second spin-off film in the V/H/S franchise and a feature-length adaptation of "Slumber Party Alien Abduction", the filmmaker's segment from the 2013 film V/H/S/2.

The film had its world premiere at Fantastic Fest on September 23, 2022, and was released in the United States on January 20, 2023, by RLJE Films and Shudder.

== Plot ==
Searching for a place to host a Halloween party, teenagers Billy, Dallas, and Trish bully young friends Gary, Jack, and Miles while the kids film a homemade fantasy movie with Gary's older sister Samantha in a barn. Billy only stops harassing the boys when he seemingly takes an interest in Sam, who becomes enamored with Billy. Gary breaks his arm while recording a wrestling scene for the movie. Due to Gary getting injured on her watch, the duo's rich parents ground Sam before leaving the siblings home alone.

Billy harasses the three friends once more when he comes to see Sam. Secretly wooing her so he can use the house for his party, Billy pretends to appreciate Sam's interests in action figures and wrestling. Sam and Billy start making out on her bed, but are interrupted by the boys when they burst in to harass Billy. The boys are then interrupted by a loud noise and lights outside, which Sam dismisses as another one of Gary's pranks. Sam calls her brother a loser and tells him to “grow up.” Billy convinces Sam to host a Halloween party while her parents are away by claiming he wants to show her off as his new girlfriend. While Gary, Jack, and Miles secretly spy on the festivities using a drone camera, Billy and his friends intentionally trash the house. Sam tries to kick out the disrespectful partygoers, which causes Billy to become physically threatening with her.

Gary, Jack, and Miles interrupt the party by hijacking the TV to broadcast a message calling out Sam for changing her personality to appeal to Billy. Billy, angered, grabs the boys from their hiding spot and brings them out to be beaten in front of everyone. Alien creatures (previously seen attacking three fishermen aboard a boat in the movie's intro) suddenly burst into the house. Partygoers flee while Gary, Jack, Miles, Billy, Dallas, and Trish are captured. Sam avoids capture by barricading herself in her bedroom.

Once the coast is clear, Sam dons a scuba suit that she uses to swim underwater to the alien spaceship submerged in the lake behind her house. After sneaking into the craft, Sam witnesses the aliens using a slime pit to melt Trish, which Gary later theorizes is how the aliens create fuel for their ship. Another type of slime mutates Dallas into a creature with bladed claws. Armed with an unusual sword she found, Sam slays several aliens to rescue her brother before he can be slimed. With Dallas pursuing him, Billy steals the scuba suit to save himself and return to the surface. Sam still escapes with the three boys by having everyone hold their breath before resurfacing.

Sam, Gary, Jack, and Miles return to the house to discover Billy locked himself safely inside. However, the now-mutated Dallas breaks through a window to resume his pursuit of Billy while Sam and the boys escape on their bicycles. In between more alien encounters, Gary and Sam reconcile. Sam, Gary, Jack, and Miles seek shelter in the barn where they had been filming their movie. Billy, who also went to the barn to hide, suddenly takes Sam hostage with her sword. The three boys attack Billy so Sam can get free, but Billy gravely wounds Jack by thrusting the sword through his stomach. While Miles tends to Jack, Dallas's sudden arrival scatters Billy, Sam, and Gary. Dallas ultimately kills Billy before the siblings finally defeat Dallas.

A tractor beam from the alien ship starts pulling Gary into the sky. Acting on a suggestion from Jack, Miles lights a fireworks rig that the friends built for their film's grand finale. The rig gets sucked into the sky too, and its subsequent explosion destroys the ship and saves Gary. With Jack barely clinging to life, Sam, Gary, and Miles start rushing him to safety until more aliens surround them. Armed soldiers from an unknown organization suddenly kill all of the creatures with automatic weapons. Unexpectedly, the soldiers then retrieve the sword, take the kids captive, and transport them to a secret location where they are put in stasis, until another spaceship arrives.

In a post-credits scene, another alien came into Sam and Gary's destroyed house until their parents came, with no knowledge of what really happened. The alien comes from behind and attacks them using the same slime that mutated Dallas.

== Cast ==
- Dominic Mariche as Gary
- Phoebe Rex as Samantha
- Calem MacDonald as Billy
- Asher Grayson as Jack
- Ben Tector as Miles
- Emma Vickers as Trish
- Isaiah Fortune as Dallas
- Jonathan Torrens as Dad
- Jessica Marie Brown as Mom

== Production ==
In December 2021, Bloody Disgusting announced Kids vs. Aliens with Jason Eisener directing with John Davies and Eisener writing the screenplay. It was also reported that Dominic Mariche, Calem MacDonald, Phoebe Rex, Asher Grayson, Ben Tector, Emma Vickers and Isaiah Fortune would all star in the film.

=== Filming ===
Principal photography on the film began in December 2021 in Nova Scotia.

== Release ==
Kids vs. Aliens premiered at Fantastic Fest on September 23, 2022, and was released by RLJE Films and Shudder on January 20, 2023.

== Music ==
Composer Andrew Gordon Macpherson wrote the music for the film and it was released digitally on his website.

== Reception ==
On the review aggregator website Rotten Tomatoes, 58% of 40 critics' reviews are positive, with an average rating of 5.4/10. The website's consensus reads: "Kids vs. Aliens occasionally comes close to offering the goofy fun promised by the title, although the end result is ultimately rather forgettable." Metacritic, which uses a weighted average, assigned the film a score of 51 out of 100, based on eight critics, indicating "mixed or average" reviews.

Noel Murray of the Los Angeles Times wrote, "while the script... is weak, there is an endearingly scruffy vibe here, goosed by some cool-looking costumes and effects. And there's a legitimate underdog edge, as Eisener and Davies capture how it feels to be underestimated and overmatched but full of can-do pluck." Katie Rife of RogerEbert.com gave it 2.5/4 stars, writing, "In keeping with our current 'poptimistic' age, Kids Vs. Aliens keeps the aggressive neon splatter, but loses the cynicism—a choice that, for all the F-bombs and fake blood, makes it a surprisingly pure film." /Film's Chris Evangelista gave it a score of 6/10, saying it "achieves what it sets out to do. Like the best junk food, it doesn't offer you anything nutritious, but you'll still enjoy the meal. You just might feel a little gross the next day, but hey, that's okay, too."

IGN's Matt Donato gave the film 5/10 stars, writing, "Kids vs. Aliens feels hurriedly unfinished, could-have-been-a-short underdeveloped, and gloopy as a distraction... Disappointingly, Kids vs. Aliens doesn't accentuate the promise of its title beyond juvenility in the form of cosmic defense thrills." Sandie Angulo Chen of Common Sense Media gave it 2/5 stars, saying it was "somewhat promising at first, but the dialogue is so reliant on coarse language that it stops being novel by the 50th use of "effing" in the first 15 minutes... Kids vs. Aliens does offer a few lighthearted laughs, but overall it's a movie that had more potential than substance. Even at just an hour and 15 minutes, it feels simultaneously unfinished and overlong."

== Future ==
In September 2022, Eisener expressed interest in developing additional Kids vs. Aliens movies, while confirming that their realization were dependent on the reception of the first film.
