= V/H/S/Halloween =

2025 American film

- Promotional release poster
- Directed by: Bryan M. Ferguson ("Diet Phantasma"); Anna Zlokovic ("Coochie Coochie Coo"); Paco Plaza ("Ut Supra Sic Infra"); Casper Kelly ("Fun Size"); Alex Ross Perry ("Kidprint"); Micheline Pitt-Norman ("Home Haunt"); R.H. Norman ("Home Haunt")
- Written by: Bryan M. Ferguson ("Diet Phantasma"); Anna Zlokovic ("Coochie Coochie Coo"); Paco Plaza ("Ut Supra Sic Infra"); Alberto Marini ("Ut Supra Sic Infra"); Casper Kelly ("Fun Size"); Alex Ross Perry ("Kidprint"); Micheline Pitt-Norman ("Home Haunt"); R.H. Norman ("Home Haunt")
- Produced by: Roy Lee; Steven Schneider; Derek Dauchy; Josh Goldbloom; Brad Miska; Michael Schreiber; Pavel Antonov
- Cinematography: Owen Laird ("Diet Phantasma"); Powell Robinson ("Coochie Coochie Coo"); Adrián Hernández ("Ut Supra Sic Infra"); Daniel Marks ("Fun Size"); Robert Kolodny ("Kidprint"); Sean McDaniel ("Home Haunt")
- Edited by: Bryan M. Ferguson ("Diet Phantasma"); Alex Familian ("Coochie Coochie Coo"); David Gallart ("Ut Supra Sic Infra"); Phil Samson ("Fun Size"); Robert Kolodny ("Kid Print"); R.H. Norman ("Home Haunt")
- Music by: Nick Chuba; Chat Pile (end credit song, "grimace_smoking_weed.jpeg")
- Production companies: Shudder Original Films; Bloody Disgusting; Cinepocalypse; Image Nation Abu Dhabi; Spooky Pictures; Studio71; Speed Demon Productions
- Distributed by: Shudder
- Release dates: September 19, 2025 (Fantastic Fest); October 3, 2025 (United States)
- Running time: 115 minutes
- Countries: United States; Spain
- Languages: English; Spanish

V/H/S/Halloween (stylized as V/H/S/Ha//oween in some of the marketing) is a 2025 American found footage horror anthology film produced by Bloody Disgusting. The sequel to V/H/S/Beyond (2024), it is the eighth installment in the V/H/S franchise. It is directed by Bryan M. Ferguson, Casper Kelly, Micheline Pitt-Norman, R.H. Norman, Alex Ross Perry, Paco Plaza, and Anna Zlokovic.

The film had its world premiere at Fantastic Fest on September 19, 2025, and was released by Shudder in the United States on October 3, 2025. A sequel, V/H/S/Mixtape, was released on October 9, 2026.

== Plot ==
The film is presented as an anthology of five films built into a narrative, which acts as its sixth film. Themed around Halloween, each short is linked together with the concept of footage as every segment is from various VHS tapes that depict different scenarios of horror stories.

=== "Diet Phantasma" (frame narrative) — Prologue ===
- Written and directed by Bryan M. Ferguson

The frame narrative focuses on a documented experiment series in 1982. The Octagon Company is planning to launch a new soda called "Diet Phantasma". They bring in multiple test subjects to try the formula before the beverage is put on shelves. The COO of the company, Dr. Rothschild, is also brought in to view the subject reviews. However, the subjects are unaware that the soda is made with the extract of vicious poltergeists. The first subject, a man designated 37, tries it; he soon begins to bleed from his eyes and face. The can then bust tendrils which attach to his face, tearing off his jaw. The body and the room are then cleaned up for the next subjects.

=== "Coochie Coochie Coo" ===
- Written and directed by Anna Zlokovic

Lacie and Kaleigh are high school students who decide to go out for one last night of trick-or-treating. They come across a trio of boys who tell them that "The Mommy" will get them because they are too old for trick-or-treating. The girls continue onward and begin to ruin other trick-or-treaters' nights by stealing their candy. Kaleigh mentions to Lacie that a girl their age dressed as a cheerleader disappeared last year, but Lacie ignores it. They soon come across a house that appears out of nowhere and is disregarded by other trick-or-treaters. They knock on the door and go inside, but discover that they are trapped by the Mommy, who leaves behind squirming fetuses and trails of milk.

Lacie and Kaleigh come across three other individuals, including the missing cheerleader, all of whom have infantile faces and act like babies. They also learn that the Mommy was once a woman who became pregnant as a result of rape. This woman hanged herself while pregnant to escape motherhood and now beckons victims into being her children. After breaking her ribs, the Mommy makes Lacie fall asleep with a lullaby and drags her away into the basement. Kaleigh chases after her and discovers that The Mommy has already converted Lacie into one of her children. Resigned to her fate, Kaleigh lies down with the other victims as the Mommy sings her lullaby again. After finishing her song, the Mommy bursts into laughter as the footage ends.

=== "Diet Phantasma" — First interlude ===
Two new subjects, a man and a woman known as 38 and 39, are brought in. The test does not go well; 38 can spray acid in his face, causing it to swell and the skin on his hands to tear off. 39s can move toward her as the tab flies off, enters her mouth, and exits through her throat, killing her.

=== "Ut Supra Sic Infra" ===
- Directed by Paco Plaza
- Written by Paco Plaza and Alberto Marini

An abandoned mansion in Madrid, allegedly home to a famous Italian medium in the past, is the scene of a bizarre mass murder during a Halloween party, in which all of the victims' eyeballs were removed and are nowhere to be found. Enric, the only survivor, is questioned by the police. The questioning is intercut with film of the party Enric attended. The film shows Enric and several of his friends entering the house and coming across an unconnected telephone in the center of the room, the walls covered in occult phrases and hieroglyphs. Enric discovers writing on the wall which says "Ut Supra Sic Infra" ("As Above, So Below") and reads it out loud three times. The phone rings, and Enric answers it. He begins to convulse as the feed cuts out.

The investigators take Enric back to the house for a crime reconstruction. He is reluctant to re-enter the room, but the attending psychiatrist tells him that it is all in his head. They enter the cupola, and Enric repeats the phrase, causing the phone to ring again. Despite Enric's pleas not to answer it, a police officer picks up the phone and hears nothing, but Enric once again convulses, possessed by some unknown force, then vomits the eyeballs of his friends before sending everyone in the room towards the ceiling, where they land on a pentagram. Enric enters through a door on the ground level and comes out of a door above, walking upside down on the ceiling. Enric then proceeds to pull everyone's eyeballs out of their heads before disappearing and returning gravity to normal, dropping their bodies back onto the floor as the footage ends.

=== "Diet Phantasma" — Second interlude ===
A young woman, Subject 40, is next. She takes a sip of her Diet Phantasma and claims that it smells awful, but tastes good. When instructed to drink the whole can, the poltergeist inside causes the subject's hands to break and twist before she vomits a black substance onto the table. Subject 40, now possessed, can see through the observation mirror, which she uses to interact with the scientists. The observers hit a button that causes the poltergeist to be sucked out of the subject and into a tube. She survives, but is taken away and burned alive with a flamethrower.

=== "Fun Size" ===
- Written and directed by Casper Kelly

Haley, Austin, Lauren, and Josh leave an adult Halloween party disappointed, as there was no candy. They decide to get candy by trick-or-treating. Lauren and Josh are celebrating their engagement, but she confides in Haley that she is having second thoughts. They come across a bowl of bizarrely named candies with a sign stating "one per person". They are confused by the names and baffled by a bar that looks like a phallus. They try searching online for information about the candy, but receive no results. When Austin reaches for a second piece of candy, a hand emerges and pulls him into the bowl, which then flies into the air and swallows the others.

The four find themselves inside a warehouse, in what appears to be a parallel reality. They are stalked and chased along blood-stained corridors by Fun Size, a humanoid being wearing a candy mascot costume, who demonstrates supernatural powers. Fun Size sends Austin into a machine where he is chopped up. His body parts are coated in caramel and chocolate, then turned into more of the strange candy bars. Haley has her face blown off with candies and then stumbles into the processing machine, where she incurs the same fate as her boyfriend. Lauren and Josh try to escape via an air shaft, which turns out to be another conveyor belt. Lauren admits that she does not want to marry Josh as he is killed. Lauren escapes outside of the factory and lands on an undistinguished exterior, possibly in the segment's original space and time frame. She attempts to remove her engagement ring, only for Fun Size to materialize in front of her and crush her skull, killing her.

A woman records her two children taking candy from Fun Size's bowl. The son claims to taste something metallic in his candy. The woman grabs the candy and sees that it is Lauren's finger, the metallic part being her engagement ring. The son admits that he took two candies, prompting the bowl to rise into the air and swallow them as the footage ends.

=== "Diet Phantasma" — Third interlude ===
The next subject is 41, a young boy, who tries a sample with a lower dosage of poltergeist extract. He says that he loves the soda and asks for another. The scientists comply, giving him a can with more extract. As 41 opens the can, he instantly explodes. The scientists proceed to clean up the room for the next test.

=== "Kidprint" ===
- Written and directed by Alex Ross Perry

In the fall of 1992, an American town is rocked by a series of disappearances of local children and teenagers, who are later found disfigured and murdered. Tim Kaplan runs a local video store where he films "Kidprints", documentary videos that can be used to identify and help search for missing children. Tim and his wife are haunted by the reports of children disappearing and showing up dead with extensive mutilations, and want to protect their two daughters.

During a sparsely attended Halloween gathering in the town square, Tim is told by a mother and a police officer that 17-year-old Olivia Hamel has gone missing. The officer asks Tim to return to the store and retrieve the backup for Olivia's Kidprint. At the closed store, he finds several monitors playing tapes of children either being tortured or begging for their lives. He discovers Olivia in the back, where his employee Bruce Dittman is terrorizing her.

Bruce has been using Tim's videos to locate and coerce children so he can torture and kill them in the store while it is closed on weekends. The psychological torture includes forcing the children to stand in front of the same board and height chart used for Kidprint videos, and filming them as they slowly realize their predicament and start screaming. The physical torture involves different forms of mutilation. One, the skinning of a boy named Drew Stackhouse, whom Bruce had lured to the store earlier, is shown. Bruce appears on tape talking to Drew, convincing him to visit the store to play video games, and later slicing skin off Drew's back and face.

Bruce ambushes Tim, beats him, and leaves him in the same room as Olivia and Drew, with the severed skin from Drew's face placed over Tim's face like a mask. Finding Tim, they assume he is as deranged as Bruce and kill him. They try to leave, only for Bruce to murder them. Bruce also films himself in front of the Kidprint board, wearing Drew's face and assuming a vulnerable, adult-fearing juvenile persona. Whether this is meant as a reenactment of trauma he endured while trick-or-treating as a child or as simple mockery of his victims is left unexplained.

Tim's body is found, and everyone believes he was the murderer. Bruce tells reporters that he will take over Kaplan Electronics and continue Kidprint, "for the sake of the children". The final scene shows a young girl screaming in front of the Kidprint board on November 4th, confirming that Bruce has continued his killing spree. The camera freezes and zooms in on the girl's face as the footage ends.

=== "Diet Phantasma" — Epilogue ===
The final test involves six subjects, five adults and a young girl. Linda warns Dr. Rothschild that the equipment is not engineered to handle this many subjects. However, he is furious that they are far behind schedule, so they proceed. As one subject opens her can, a video camera catches fire. A female subject is attacked by one of the cans, which grips her scalp and tears part of it off. Another subject's tongue is ripped out after the can crushes itself into his mouth, then becomes possessed. The possessed subject crushes another subject's head until his eyes pop out, and he vomits the same black substance as Subject 40 all over another subject.

All the poltergeists are extracted from the subjects, except for the little girl, 47, who remains possessed. Dr. Rothschild asks what her favorite soda is, and she replies, "Diet Phantasma". The other subjects, reanimated via possession, attempt to escape. With the knowledge that at least one person drank it and did not die, Dr. Rothschild orders his staff to manufacture and ship Diet Phantasma immediately, using the formula 47 drank. The remaining living subjects begin pounding on the glass, with all but Subject 47 being mauled to death by the possessed tongueless subject. The frame narrative suggests that the possessed subjects then broke through the observation window and killed the researchers.

=== "Home Haunt" ===
- Written and directed by Micheline Pitt-Norman & R.H. Norman

Keith loves setting up an elaborate haunted house with his wife Nancy (played by Sarah Nicklin) and son Zack in their home every Halloween, but the now-teenage Zack no longer wants to participate in the family tradition. Keith convinces Zack to go to the store to pick up some items for the house. Keith sneaks into the back and finds a record called "Halloween Horrors", which he steals. Keith opens his haunted house for the neighborhood, playing the record. The music from the record causes supernatural occurrences, including the record bursting into flames and the lights going out, making everyone panic and flee in terror.

The monsters from the decorations suddenly come to life, killing most of the attendees. Zack, Keith, and Nancy manage to survive and escape from the house, only for a witch to fly out and grab Zack's camera. The witch proceeds to massacre children who are out trick-or-treating. The entrance to the haunted house, which is shaped like a monster's jaws and hands, begins to come to life and break free from the building as the footage ends.

=== "Diet Phantasma" — Mid-credit scene ===
Subject 47 is seen in a commercial for Diet Phantasma. The commercial reveals that the soda is made from actual poltergeists. At first, 47 seems back to normal, but as she drinks from a can and recites the product's slogan, her voice deepens and her eyes go solid white.

== Cast ==
=== "Diet Phantasma" ===
- David Haydn as Blaine Rothschild
- Anna McKelvie as Linda
- Adam James Johnston as Larry
- Eddie MacKenzie as Lenny
- Joshua Haynes as Subject 37
- Alexander Cox as Subject 38
- Aisha Lawal as Subject 39
- Becca Murphy as Subject 40
- Ivor Navarrete Jack as Subject 41
- Yui Minari as Subject 42
- Tom Lowes as Subject 43
- Joshua Frate-Loughlin as Subject 44
- Daniel Kabanda as Subject 45
- Greer Montgomery as Subject 46
- Milana Ross as Subject 47
- Bryan M. Ferguson as Commercial Voiceover (voice)

=== "Coochie Coochie Coo" ===
- Samantha Cochran as Lacie
- Natalia Montgomery Fernandez as Kaleigh
- Elena Musser as The Mommy
- Adam Carr as Diaper Man
- Charlotte Mae Curtis as Cheerleader
- Rebekah Kennedy as Swaddled Woman
- Charlie Gehrt as Kid #1
- Samuel Charles as Kid #2
- Brayon Cutrer as Kid #3
- Jodi Fleisher as Mom #1
- Anna Zlokovic as Mom #2

=== "Ut Supra Sic Infra" ===
- Teo Planell as Enric
- María Romanillos as Vicky
- Ismael Martínez as Inspector
- Almudena Amor as Abogada
- Sonia Almarcha as Jueza
- Nestor Aguilera as Secretario Judicial
- Adrián Hernández as Operador
- Raúl Romanillos as Policía 1
- Ana Esteban as Policía 2
- Javier Vivar as Policía 3
- Andrés Ciro Martínez as Demonio
- Roberta Benítez as Demonia
- Sergio Argüeso Mercero as Chico Catrina
- María Sampedro as Muñeca
- Leo Rodríguez as Freddy
- Nicolás Martín as Zombie
- Sandra Escacena as Verónica
- Mateo Fernández as Surfero
- Chloe Carzola as Papá Noel

=== "Fun Size" ===
- Lawson Greyson as Lauren
- Riley Nottingham as Josh
- Jenna Hogan as Haley
- Jake Ellsworth as Austin
- Michael J. Sielaff as Fun Size
- Joey B as Fun Size's Assistant
- Eric Billitzer as Older Man
- Deborah Ramaglia as Older Woman
- Sami Nye as Mom
- Falcon Franco as Liam
- Sloan Lucas Muldown as Daughter

=== "Kidprint" ===
- Stephen Gurewitz as Tim Kaplan
- Carl William Garrison as Bruce Dittman
- Siobhan McGroarty as Olivia
- Harlo Cozzens as Drew Stackhouse
- Christian Paxton as Ashley
- Bailey Paulson as Lindsay
- Miles Emanuel as Miles
- Lily Speiser as Maria Comstock
- Sarah Nedwek as Emily Kaplan
- Nori Levitt as Michaela Kaplan
- Pepper Guerrieri as Charlotte Kaplan
- Shino Nakamichi as Alicia Kernson
- Evelyn Spahr as Nicole
- Sal Rendino as Local Cop
- Juliana Danielle Ferriera as Betsey
- Declan Foley as Ethan
- Kidprints
  - Calvin Wise
  - Cleo Kennedy
  - Maureen Abedin
  - Leo Mennella
  - Loa Moon
  - Lila Coopersmith
  - Ruby Dixon Fleming
  - Brandon Treloar
  - Sadie Peters
  - Aine Fortuna
  - Maisie Matthews
  - Cadence Degraaf
  - Mary Waugh

=== "Home Haunt" ===
- Jeff Harms as Keith
- Noah Diamond as Zack
  - Oliver Durante as young Zack
- Sarah Nicklin as Nancy
- Rick Baker as Rich
- Silamith Maclean as Judy
- Jennifer Jonassen as Antique Store Clerk
- Hallie Ruth Jacobs as Samantha
  - Iris Rich as Ballerina Girl Double
- Matt Dizon as Bumblebee Boy
- Sean Berube as The Executioner
- Layton Khan as Billy
- Manuel Rafael Lozano as Bumblebee Dad
- Monica Evans as Ashley
- Isabella Feliciana as Brittany
- Lize Johnston as Witch/Female Rotting Ghoul
- Witcheline as Flying Witch
- Ashley Thomson as Cat Girl's Mom
- Erich Edward as Male Rotting Ghoul
- Mikel Martin as Boy in Mummy Costume
- Bianca Thomson as Girl in Cat Costume

== Development ==
In October 2024 at the New York Comic Con 2024, it was announced that an eighth V/H/S film was in development. Josh Goldbloom, Brad Miska, and James Harris would serve as producers. The project would be a joint-venture production between Shudder Original Films and Bloody Disgusting.

In July 2025, Bloody Disgusting announced the film's directors as Bryan M. Ferguson, Casper Kelly, Micheline Pitt-Norman, R.H. Norman, Alex Ross Perry, Paco Plaza, and Anna Zlokovic, and announced the official title as V/H/S/Halloween.

In September 2025, Collider shared a behind-the-scenes preview of the segment "Home Haunt" — about a cursed antique that brings the several props of a home-made Halloween haunt to life — featuring various images of its monsters inspired by "Americana classic home haunt mazes".

== Release ==
V/H/S/Halloween had its world premiere at Fantastic Fest on September 19, 2025, and debuted as an exclusive release on Shudder on October 3, 2025.

== Reception ==
On the review aggregator website Rotten Tomatoes, 89% of 66 critics' reviews are positive, with an average rating of 7.2/10. The website's consensus reads: "Consistently unnerving as it cycles through a series of shorts that are more treat than trick, V/H/S Halloween is one of the most purely enjoyable cassettes in the franchise yet." Metacritic, which uses a weighted average, assigned the film a score of 68 out of 100, based on 11 critics, indicating "generally favorable" reviews.

Writing for RogerEbert.com, critic Brian Tallerico mentioned that the film "feels the most tonally consistent" of the franchise, having "maybe the best batting average," and awarding it 3 out of 4 stars. Similarly, Ryan Scott from /Film praised V/H/S/Halloween for being "darkly fun" and disturbing, highlighting the quality of the wraparound and also Perry's segment as "the darkest moment in 'V/H/S' history," scoring the film 8.5 out of 10.

In a positive review, The Austin Chronicle's Richard Whittaker wrote that the antagonist from Zlokovic's segment "may go down as one of the series’ creepiest monsters", while also praising the Normans' closing segment as "surprisingly epic" and the preceding short from Perry as "the closest a segment has come in years to the early, edgy, innovative shocks of the first two V/H/S movies." Slant Magazine rated the film 3 out of 4 stars, reporting that "[t]hough each segment has a slightly different stylistic flavor, they’re united by a devilish mean-spiritedness," also highlighting "the sadistic acts of torture carried out in 'Kidprint'".

In a more indifferent review, Britt Hayes of MovieWeb.com commented on the anthology's uneavenness as "a mixed bag of treats", criticising the first two segments as "a little long", but overall saying the film is "another mostly entertaining gore-fest with a few gnarly tricks up its sleeve." Similarly, Mike Boltz of JoBlo.com praised it as "perfect spooky season viewing for the initiated", comparing it to a modern Faces of Death, while criticizing the long running time, and giving the film a 7 out of 10.[1]

== Sequel ==
In August 2026, Bloody Disgusting has announced a ninth film, titled V/H/S/Mixtape, which was released by Shudder on October 9, 2026.

== See also ==
- List of ghost films
