= Spooky Pictures =

American film and television production company

- Type: Privately held company
- Industry: Film; Television
- Founded: March 2, 2020; 6 years ago
- Founder: Steven Schneider; Roy Lee
- Headquarters: Los Angeles, California, United States
- Key people: Steven Schneider; Roy Lee; Rami Yasin; Jakob Pollack; Simona Paparelli Wolf
- Divisions: Made By Spooky

Spooky Pictures is an American film and television production company, founded in 2020 by Steven Schneider and Roy Lee. The company is known for producing the films Watcher, Late Night with the Devil, Strange Darling, The Plague, Undertone and Hokum.

== Overview ==
On March 2, 2020, Steven Schneider and Roy Lee founded Spooky Pictures, with the company signing a first-look producing deal with Image Nation Studios. On June 12, 2023, Schneider partnered with Slash and his company Malkier Studios to produce a slate of horror films.

On June 6, 2025, it was reported by Deadline that a bidding war was underway for the rights for The Texas Chainsaw Massacre franchise, with many studios and creatives involved. In September 2025, A24 emerged as the front runner, with a film for Netflix also happening; the former acquired the film and television rights to the franchise in February 2026. On April 21, 2026, it was announced that Curry Barker is set to write and direct the film for A24. On September 24, 2025, the company signs a multi-year film deal with Fandomodo Films.

On January 30, 2026, the company and Image Nation Studios acquired the rights to the V/H/S franchise from Studio71. On October 20, 2026, the company and Image Nation Studios ink a multi-picture deal with Longevity Pictures. The following day, the company formed the horror label Made By Spooky with Image Nation Studios and Made By Us. The label would produce original short form, vertical serialized and longform IP revolving around digital native horror talent.

== Feature films ==
Release date	Title	Director(s)	Distributor
June 3, 2022	Watcher	Chloe Okuno	IFC Midnight; Shudder
March 22, 2024	Late Night with the Devil	Colin Cairnes; Cameron Cairnes	IFC Films; Shudder
August 23, 2024	Strange Darling	JT Mollner	Magenta Light Studios
October 4, 2024	V/H/S/Beyond	Jay Cheel; Jordan Downey; Virat Pal; Justin Martinez; Christian Long; Justin Long; Kate Siegel	Shudder
April 18, 2025	Dead Mail	Joe DeBoer; Kyle McConaghy	Shudder
October 3, 2025	V/H/S/Halloween	Bryan M. Ferguson; Anna Zlokovic; Paco Plaza; Casper Kelly; Alex Ross Perry; Micheline Pitt-Norman; R. H. Norman	Shudder
December 24, 2025	The Plague	Charlie Polinger	Independent Film Company
March 13, 2026	Undertone	Ian Tuason	A24
May 1, 2026	Hokum	Damian McCarthy	Neon
October 9, 2026	V/H/S/Mixtape	Flying Lotus; Renee Zhan; David Moreau; Ernest Dickerson; Tobias Forge; RZA	Shudder

=== Upcoming films ===
Release date	Title	Director(s)	Distributor	Ref.
November 20, 2026	The Vile	Majid Al Ansari	Dark Sky Films	
January 8, 2027	The Liberation	Guy Nattiv	Bleecker Street	
January 15, 2027	River	Joshua Giuliano	Universal Pictures	
May 7, 2027	Anything but Ghosts	Curry Barker	Focus Features	

=== Undated films ===
Title	Director(s)	Distributor	Ref.
4 X 4: The Event	Alexander Ullom	Neon	
Archangel	Bryan Edward Hill	—N/a	
Company	Casey Affleck	—N/a	
Desert Road	Shannon Triplett	Firebrand Media Group	
Imposters	Caleb Phillips	Brainstorm Media	
Menace	Randall Okita	Independent Film Company; Shudder	
Occupant	Joshua Giuliano	Focus Features	
Pathetic Fallacy	Adam Egypt Mortimer	—N/a	
The Punishing	Chris Sparling	—N/a	
Recluse	Henry Chaisson	Vertical	
The Shepherd	John Hyams	Magnolia Pictures	
Sundowning	Ian McDonald	—N/a	
System	Joachim Rønning	—N/a	
What Happened to Doris?	Nick Simon	GVN Releasing	

== Short films ==
Release date	Title	Director(s)	Ref.
January 26, 2025	Em & Selma Go Griffin Hunting	Alexander Thompson	
