= V/H/S/Beyond =

2024 film

- Promotional release poster
- Directed by: Jay Cheel ("Abduction/Adduction"); Jordan Downey ("Stork"); Virat Pal ("Dream Girl"); Justin Martinez ("Live And Let Dive"); Christian Long ("Fur Babies"); Justin Long ("Fur Babies”); Kate Siegel ("Stowaway”)
- Written by: Jordan Downey ("Stork"); Kevin Stewart ("Stork"); Christian Long ("Fur Babies"); Justin Long ("Fur Babies"); Justin Martinez ("Live and Let Dive"); Ben Turner ("Live and Let Dive"); Virat Pal ("Dream Girl"); Evan Dickson ("Dream Girl"); Mike Flanagan ("Stowaway"); Jay Cheel ("Abduction/Adduction")
- Produced by: Josh Goldbloom; Pavel Antonov; Brad Miska; James Harris; Michael Schreiber
- Starring: Dane DiLiegro ("Stork"); Alanah Pearce ("Stowaway"); Mitch Horowitz ("Abduction/Adduction")
- Cinematography: Tapan Basu ("Dream Girl"); Alexander Chinnici; Mike McLaughlin ("Abduction/Adduction"); Kevin Stewart
- Edited by: Jordan Downey ("Stork"); Jay Cheel ("Abduction/Adduction"); Tanya Chhabria; Thom Newell; Ben Turner
- Music by: Nick Soole ("Stork"); Jay Cheel ("Abduction/Adduction"); Holy Blade (end credit song, "Beyond")
- Production companies: Cinepocalypse; Image Nation Abu Dhabi; Spooky Pictures; Studio71
- Distributed by: Shudder; Bloody Disgusting
- Release dates: September 20, 2024 (Fantastic Fest); October 4, 2024 (United States)
- Running time: 114 minutes
- Countries: United States; India
- Languages: English; Hindi

V/H/S/Beyond is a 2024 found footage science fiction horror anthology film produced by Bloody Disgusting. The sequel to V/H/S/85 (2023), it is the seventh installment in the V/H/S franchise and features five found footage segments linked together by a sixth frame narrative. It was written and directed by Jay Cheel, Jordan Downey, Virat Pal, Justin Martinez, Christian and Justin Long, and Kate Siegel.

The film premiered at Fantastic Fest on September 20, 2024, and was released as a Shudder Original Film through the streaming service Shudder in the United States on October 4, 2024. A sequel, V/H/S/Halloween, was released October 3, 2025.

== Plot ==
The film is presented as an anthology of five short horror films themed around science fiction tropes, and built into a frame narrative which acts as its own sixth short horror film shot akin to a documentary, with interviews from ufologists.

=== "Abduction/Adduction" (frame narrative) — Prologue ===
- Written and directed by Jay Cheel

An anonymous Redditor buys a pair of video cassettes from a flea market supposedly containing evidence of an alien encounter. Director Jay Cheel receives an anonymous email with digitized footage. The footage follows the story of the "Farrington House", an urban legend in Canada. In the 2000s, a paranormal group led by Mitch Horowitz collected anecdotal evidence of a "gray form" reputed to be an alien.

=== "Stork" ===
- Directed by Jordan Downey
- Written by Jordan Downey and Kevin Stewart
- Based on artwork by Oleg Vdovenko

Police unit W.A.R.D.E.N. stumble upon a dilapidated house amidst a string of baby disappearances. Rookie Segura is tasked to film the entire mission while another member, E.T., is revealed to be the father of a missing baby. They spot and follow a shambling zombie-like person (Note: Dubbed a "Brooder" in the credits.) inside the house. They attract and kill several other Brooders, and after hearing a baby's cries, E.T. charges toward the noise.

The unit finds a cracked-open meteor on the second floor and infers that it is the cause of the incidents. While ascending the floors, the Brooders return to life. On the third floor, they find a tall creature holding a baby and singing a lullaby. They enter the attic and find several babies who have mutated to have beaks. Nearby, a large stork-like creature regurgitates E.T.'s corpse into the mouth of a newborn. E.T. reanimates and attacks Segura. The unit kills E.T. and the stork. Afterward, Segura, accepted into W.A.R.D.E.N., stomps on the stork's head. The unit takes a picture with the creature's body as the footage ends.

=== "Abduction/Adduction" — First interlude ===
A family of Chinese immigrants arrives in Toronto in the 1950s and purchase a home built in the late Victorian era. After the parents die, the eldest son begins experiencing night terrors. Believing the house to be haunted, he sets up two cameras. By the 1980s, he put the house up for sale before disappearing shortly after.

=== "Dream Girl" ===
- Directed by Virat Pal
- Written by Virat Pal and Evan Dickson

Mumbai paparazzi Arnab and Sonu are tasked to get footage of the latest Bollywood sensation Tara. They meet their contact, Gippy, who instructs them to go to Tara's trailer. They instead film one of Tara's shoots, which is interrupted by Tara's manager, who demands that she go on break. Afterward, Arnab sneaks into Tara's trailer and hides in the closet.

After witnessing an argument between Tara and her manager, Arnab accidentally reveals himself when he discovers Tara's face in a bowl. Arnab tells Tara that she does not need to be pushed around. Emboldened by his words, Tara reveals herself as a gynoid and rips her face off and attempts to take Arnab's to escape stardom. Tara goes on a rampage, killing her manager and the film's cast and crew. She then kills Gippy and Sonu before killing Arnab and wearing his face. She then walks outside and meets with a large group of paparazzi, proceeding to pounce on and slaughter them as the footage ends.

=== "Abduction/Adduction" — Second interlude ===
Horowitz explains that alien concepts trace back to Whitley Strieber's 1987 book Communion, as it popularized the idea of grey aliens. He explains that it led us to think that maybe we are not alone, and that they may be hostile.

=== "Live and Let Dive" ===
- Directed by Justin Martinez
- Written by Ben Turner and Justin Martinez

Zach celebrates his 30th birthday with his wife Jess and best friend Logan by skydiving. Before jumping, they spot a large unidentified flying object and several fighter jets. An alien boards the plane before it collides with the ship. Zach jumps and learns that Logan, who was strapped to him, was decapitated when the parachute opened. Zach searches for Jess before an alien suddenly attacks the group, killing Zach's friends one by one. He later finds Jess' corpse, prompting him to break down crying.

Zach escapes the attack and jumps into a farmer's truck, who demands that he leave. While being held at gunpoint, the alien attacks the farmer, causing him to shoot the gun, injuring Zach's right hand. Another alien appears and shoots a beam from its forehead that stuns Zach before disappearing. Zach drives away but is pulled into the air by the ship's tractor beam. Inside the ship, a horde of aliens rushes at Zach as the footage ends.

=== "Abduction/Adduction" — Third interlude ===
Horowitz explains his interest in alien sightings, but says that he does not have the expertise to analyze them. The segment cuts to Niko Pueringer and Sam Gorski of the YouTube channel Corridor Digital, known for analyzing digital effects. They explain that if an alien footage relies on the viewer not being able to clearly see it, then it loses credibility, but they do express their interest.

=== "Fur Babies" ===
- Directed and written by Christian Long and Justin Long

An animal rights activist group—Stuart, Angela, Miles, Pat, and Christina—investigate the house of Becky, a woman who runs a supposed dog daycare center and keeps taxidermies of her past dogs. Becky explains to Stuart and Angela that she keeps them because she does not have the heart to bury her dogs. They notice that one of the taxidermied dogs, Gary, is missing, and Becky explains that she has something planned for him, as he died defending Becky from a robber.

Becky takes Stuart and Angela to the basement. Becky states that other people asked her questions and her brother Bo captures Stuart and Angela to turn them into half-human, half-dog hybrids surgically. Miles, Pat, and Christina break into the house, but are caught by Becky, who unleashes two other hybrids, Gary and Abraham, to maul them to death.

Later, a porch pirate attempts to steal packages from Becky's front door, only to be killed by "Gary" as the footage ends.

=== "Abduction/Adduction" — Fourth interlude ===
Horowitz explains that, during the Cold War, the public saw aliens as "invaders" due to the popularity of Orson Welles' radio drama The War of the Worlds, which caused mass hysteria. Pueringer and Gorski then talk about their Boston Dynamics parody videos, which featured robots being abused by humans that were so convincing that people sent death threats to Boston Dynamics. Horowitz talks about how, even when something is debunked, some believers will not be dissuaded.

=== "Stowaway" ===
- Directed by Kate Siegel
- Written by Mike Flanagan

Recorded over footage from her daughter's birthday party, Hailey documents her findings of possible extraterrestrial encounters in the Mojave Desert. After investigating a light falling from the sky, she finds and enters an alien spaceship. While examining its interior, she cuts herself, and nanites come out to heal her. She discovers that this causes mutations due to the ship keeping animals in stasis and copying their DNA. After she hides from an alien, Hailey realizes that she has no escape. Hailey is mangled as the ship accelerates to light speed, trapping her in a cycle of mutilation and repair. Hailey sees the alligator keychain she gifted her daughter, whom she is heavily implied to have abandoned, floating just out of her mutated self's reach, leaving her to sob as the footage ends.

=== "Abduction/Adduction" — Epilogue ===
Horowitz, Pueringer, Gorski, and Brian Baker of The Superstitious Times watch the son's footage from the cameras to give their reactions and describe what is happening. The footage shows him asleep in bed as an alien creature enters his bedroom the alien took the egg from the son's body. The alien puts a camera inside of the son's throat as the footage ends.

== Cast ==
=== "Abduction/Adduction" ===
- Brian Baker
- Trevor Dow
- Gerry Eng
- Sam Gorski
- Mitch Horowitz
- Niko Pueringer
- Wren Weichman

=== "Stork" ===
- Thom Hallum as Broome
- James C. Burns as Aubert
- Jolene Andersen as Bennet
- Tyler Joseph Andrews as Ivy
- Vas Provatakis as E.T.
- Phillip Andre Botello as Segura
- Morgan L. Chancelien as Giant Brooder
- Dane DiLiegro as Stork
- Chris Page as Brooder
- Alan Maxson as Brooder
- Blaine McGee as Brooder
- Morgan McGee as Brooder
- Suzie Usaj as Radio DJ

=== "Dream Girl" ===
- Namrata Sheth as Tara
- Sayandeep Sangupta as Arnab
- Rohan Joshi as Sonu
- Ashwin Mushran as Manager
- Rikin Saigal as Gippy
- Farhan Syed as Director
- Swati Jain as Pari
- Virat Pal as Boss

=== "Live and Let Dive" ===
- Bobby Slaski as Zach
- Rhett Wellington as Logan
- Jerry Campisi as Noah
- Bix Krieger as Brittney
- Hannah McBride as Jess
- Skip Howland as Pilot Skip
- Jeff Turner as Skip's Nephew
- Dominique Star as Solo Jumper
- Jared Trevino as Jess's Instructor
- Matt Tramel as Injured Instructor
- Felipe Cortéz Muñoz as Tandem Instructor
- Nate Shane as Legless Guy
- Sebastian Redd as Dazed Instructor
- Mike Ferguson as Farmer

=== "Fur Babies" ===
- Libby Letlow as Becky
- Matthew Layton as Stuart
- Braedyn Bruner as Angela
- Kevin Bohleber as Miles
- Phillip Lundquist as Bo
- Trevor Wright as Abraham / Paleman
- Cameron Krugman as Pat
- Jenna McCarthy as Christina
- Sivan Genier as Sam
- William Granillo as Gary
- Justin Long as porch pirate

=== "Stowaway" ===
- Alanah Pearce as Halley
- Josh Goldbloom as Colorful Local
- Boomer Feith as Local #1
- Yuritzi Bojorquez as Local #2
- Ketzali Bjorquez as Daughter
- Theodora Flanagan as Halley's Daughter
- Joey Wilson as Alien Figure

== Production ==
In October 2023 at the New York Comic Con, it was announced that a seventh V/H/S was in development. Each of the anthology segments are sci-fi oriented in the vein of other horror franchise sequels set in outer space such as Jason X, Leprechaun 4: In Space, Hellraiser: Bloodline, Dracula 3000, and Amityville in Space, for a Shudder exclusive release. Josh Goldbloom, Brad Miska, and James Harris served as producers. The project is a joint-venture production between Shudder Original Films, Bloody Disgusting, Cinepocalypse, and Studio71.

In July 2024, Bloody Disgusting announced the film's directors as Jordan Downey, Christian and Justin Long, Justin Martinez, Virat Pal and Kate Siegel, with Michael Schreiber as an additional producer. Kate Siegel initially planned to do a segment that would have been a musical. After this was shot down, she suggested a short involving the Muppets and even wanted to get Brian Henson involved, but this idea was turned down too. She eventually spoke with Mike Flanagan and settled on the final version seen in the film.

== Release ==
V/H/S/Beyond premiered at Fantastic Fest on September 20, 2024, followed by an exclusive release on Shudder on October 4, 2024.

== Reception ==
On the review aggregator website Rotten Tomatoes, 90% of 62 critics' reviews are positive, with an average rating of 6.9/10. The website's consensus reads: "The V/H/S series shows no signs of the tape wearing out with this terrifying entry, boasting an assortment of shorts that'll sate the appetite of horror and sci-fi aficionados alike." Metacritic, which uses a weighted average, assigned the film a score of 65 out of 100, based on 8 critics, indicating "generally favorable" reviews.

Ryan Scott of /Film gave the film a 9/10 rating, writing "pound for pound, segment for segment, death for death, this is everything we could possibly want from a horror anthology". The Fort Worth Report described the series as "out-of-this-world fun", noting that "each of the six short films is exceptional", and The A.V. Club remarked that, "While other V/H/S installments have sometimes been scattershot, united by format and time period more than anything else, V/H/S/Beyond holds together almost perfectly as a thematic exploration of the things lurking just beyond our understanding."

Screen Rant noted that the series "has found quite a bit of success, and it's partly thanks to the huge number of talented actors who contributed to the project". Brian Tellerico of RogerEbert.com gave the film a middling review, awarding 2.5 stars out of 4.

== Sequel ==
At New York Comic Con 2024, an eighth film in the franchise was announced, titled V/H/S/8, targeting a 2025 release.

On July 23, 2025, it was revealed by Bloody Disgusting that the new installment in the long-running franchise will officially be titled V/H/S/Halloween and was released on October 3, 2025, on the streaming service Shudder.

== See also ==
- List of ghost films
