= Brad Miska =

American horror film producer

- Born: United States
- Other name: Mr. Disgusting
- Occupation: Film producer
- Known for: Founder of Bloody Disgusting
- Website: Bloody-Disgusting

Brad Miska is an American film producer and founder of Bloody Disgusting, a horror genre website known for covering horror films, video games, comics and music. His films include the V/H/S franchise, Under the Bed, A Horrible Way to Die and Southbound.

== Career ==
Miska founded Bloody Disgusting in 2001 (under the pseudonym "Mr. Disgusting") with co-founder Tom Owen. Together, they run the site along with Adam Dodd and Jonathan Barkan. By 2007, the site had 1.5 million unique visitors and 20 million page views each month. In September 2007 a minority stake was purchased by The Collective, a Beverly Hills–based management company. In 2011 Bloody Disgusting began distributing and producing films.

On 6 January 2026, it was announced that Brad Miska became the owner and editor-in-chief of Dread Central, a news website centered on horror fiction.

== Bloody Disgusting Selects ==
In 2011, Bloody Disgusting partnered with AMC Networks and The Collective to create a distribution company named Bloody Disgusting Selects, releasing genre films in AMC theaters and on DVD, Blu-ray and VOD platforms. Films distributed via Bloody Disgusting Selects films are:

- Alyce Kills
- Atrocious (Directed by Fernando Barreda Luna)
- Blood Runs Cold
- Chop
- Coldfish
- Crawl
- Delivery
- Exit Humanity
- Fever Night
- The Haunting of Helena
- Hellacious Acres
- Macabre
- Outcast
- The Pack
- Phase 7
- Rammbock
- Truth or Die
- The Woman (Directed by Lucky McKee, written by Jack Ketchum)
- Yellowbrickroad (winner best film at the 2010 New York City Horror Film Festival)

== Filmography ==
- His Name Was Jason: 30 Years of Friday the 13th (Documentary film; 2009) – himself (uncredited)
- A Horrible Way to Die (associate producer) – premiered at the 2010 Toronto International Film Festival. It also played at Fantastic Fest^{[3]} where it received three major awards: Best Screenplay for Simon Barrett, Best Actor for AJ Bowen and Best Actress for Amy Seimetz
- V/H/S (concept, producer) – premiered at the 2012 Sundance Film Festival
- Under the Bed (producer) – premiered at the 2012 Fantasia International Film Festival
- V/H/S/2 (concept, producer) – premiered at the 2013 Sundance Film Festival
- V/H/S: Viral (concept, producer) – premiered at the 2014 Fantastic Fest film festival
- Southbound (producer, actor) – premiered at the 2015 Toronto International Film Festival
- Siren (producer) – premiered at the 2016 Horror Channel FrightFest
- V/H/S/94 (concept, producer) – premiered at the 2021 Fantastic Fest film festival
- V/H/S/99 (producer) – premiered at the 2022 Toronto International Film Festival
- Kids vs. Aliens (producer) – premiered at the 2022 Fantastic Fest film festival
- V/H/S/85 (producer) – premiered at the 2023 Fantastic Fest film festival
- V/H/S/Beyond (producer) – premiered at the 2024 Fantastic Fest film festival
- V/H/S/Halloween (producer) – premiered at the 2025 Fantastic Fest film festival
