= Imposters (film) =

2026 film by Caleb Phillips

- Film poster
- Directed by: Caleb Phillips
- Written by: Caleb Phillips
- Produced by: Joe Bandelli; Sara Seligman
- Starring: Jessica Rothe; Charlie Barnett; Yul Vazquez
- Cinematography: Allie Schultz
- Edited by: Nick Landa
- Music by: Alex Winkler
- Production companies: Broken Pig Productions; Marylous' Boys; Spooky Pictures
- Distributed by: Brainstorm Media
- Release date: March 15, 2026 (SXSW)
- Running time: 99 minutes
- Country: United States
- Language: English

Imposters is a 2026 American science fiction horror film written and directed by Caleb Phillips in his directorial debut. It stars Jessica Rothe, Charlie Barnett, and Yul Vazquez.

Imposters had its premiere at the 2026 South by Southwest Film & TV Festival on March 15, 2026. It is set to be released in the United States by Brainstorm Media.

== Synopsis ==
When their baby boy is abducted, his mother Marie learns a method to rescue him. However, her husband Paul will grow increasingly concerned that the infant she brought back is not actually their son.

== Cast ==
- Jessica Rothe as Marie
- Charlie Barnett as Paul
- Yul Vazquez as Chief Ezra Reid
- Bates Wilder as Orson
  - Thomas Parobek as Young Orson
- Luisina Quarleri as Jacky
- Taylor Karin as Orson's mother
- Ian Lyons as Dad
- Lee Bennett
- Declan Bennett

== Release ==
In January 2026, UK-based distribution company Blue Finch Films acquired the movie's worldwide sales rights. It is Caleb Phillips' directorial debut. The film premiered at the 2026 South by Southwest Film & TV Festival on March 15, 2026. In November 2026, Brainstorm Media acquired the U.S. rights for a theatrical release.

== Reception ==
On the review aggregator website Rotten Tomatoes, 100% of 14 critics' reviews are positive, with an average rating of 7.6/10.

Imposters received positive reviews from Meagan Navarro of Bloody Disgusting and Kat Hughes of The Hollywood News, who gave the film four out of five stars. Writing for RogerEbert.com, Brian Tallerico gave Imposters a generally favorable review.

== External link ==
- Imposters at IMDb
