= Rob Cotterill =

Canadian film producer and assistant director

- Born: November 26, 1971 (age 54)
- Education: Concordia University
- Occupations: Producer, assistant director
- Years active: 1994-present
- Notable work: Hobo with a Shotgun

Rob Cotterill (born November 26, 1971) is a Canadian film producer and assistant director. As part of Yer Dead Productions with friend and director Jason Eisener, they created Treevenge (2008) and, along with John Davies, Hobo with a Shotgun (2011) after making a winning mock trailer for Grindhouse (2007). Cotterill has also done production work for Possessor (2020), Tin Can (2020), Kids vs. Aliens (2022), Infinity Pool (2023), and was the first assistant director for Heated Rivalry (2025).

== Early life and career ==
Cotterill was born on November 26, 1971. He graduated from Kennebecasis Valley High School in Quispamsis, New Brunswick and attended Concordia University in Montreal, where he studied film. His first works involved working as an assistant director, including in works such as Starhunter, where he served as third assistant director. For seven years, he worked on set of the Trailer Park Boys, where he met Nova Scotian director Jason Eisener, who brought up a mock trailer contest for the upcoming film Grindhouse. Cotterill, along with Eisener and John Davies, created their entry, Hobo with a Shotgun, with a production cost totalling $150. As part of the 2007 release of Grindhouse, their fake trailer won, beating over 300 other entries. The trailer was also uploaded on YouTube, where it generated over 730,000 views.

== Career ==
As a part of their production company Yer Dead Productions, Cotterill and Eisener created 2008 short film Treevenge. In 2011, Cotterill, Eisener and Davies adapted their once-fake trailer into the feature-length film, Hobo with a Shotgun, as a result from fan demand. Filming for the movie finished in mid-2010, being shot in Dartmouth and Halifax in Nova Scotia.

Cotterill has done further production work for the 2017 film The Crescent, 2020 films Possessor and Tin Can, 2022 film Kids vs. Aliens, and 2023 film Infinity Pool. He currently lives in Halifax, Nova Scotia.
