= Chad Villella =

American film actor and producer

- Villella at Lincoln Center, August 21, 2019.
- Born: February 12, 1977 (age 49); Pennsylvania, United States
- Occupations: Writer, Actor, Director
- Years active: 2007–present
- Website: Official Website

Chad Villella (born February 12, 1977) is an American producer, writer, director and actor. He is co-creator of Chad, Matt & Rob and Radio Silence. His films include V/H/S, Devil's Due, Southbound, Ready or Not, Scream, Scream VI and Abigail.

== Biography ==
Villella is originally from Punxsutawney, Pennsylvania and a graduate of Mercyhurst College. He is co-creator of the Center for Information Research Analysis And Training (CIRAT).

== Film ==
Villella is co-founder of the filmmaking collectives Chad, Matt & Rob and Radio Silence. In 2024, Villella left Radio Silence.

=== Chad, Matt & Rob ===
Chad Villella co-founded Chad, Matt & Rob with Matt Bettinelli-Olpin and Rob Polonsky in 2007. The group is known for their unique blend of comedy, adventure, sci-fi and horror. According to an interview in IndieWire, Bettinelli-Olpin worked in the mailroom and later as the office manager at New Line Cinema, where the group would sneak in after hours to use the offices as their sets. Among their numerous short films is the viral found footage style video Roommate Alien Prank Gone Bad and five installments of their first-of-its-kind series of Interactive Adventures. As of November 2013, their shorts have received near 70,000,000 views on the Chad, Matt & Rob YouTube channel.

=== Radio Silence ===
After the dissolution of Chad, Matt & Rob, Villella formed Radio Silence with Bettinelli-Olpin, Tyler Gillett and Justin Martinez. The group directed a segment in the feature film V/H/S," which premiered at the 2012 Sundance Film Festival and was acquired by Magnolia Pictures. Their segment of V/H/S is titled 10/31/98 and according to Ain't It Cool News the story is "set on Halloween as a group of friends go in search for a Halloween party."

The following year, they made Devil's Due for 20th Century Fox and their film Southbound premiered at the 2015 Toronto International Film Festival and was released theatrically by the Orchard on February 5, 2016.

On October 30, 2017, it was announced that the trio would adapt Bryce Moore's novel The Memory Thief for 20th Century Fox.

In March 2020, it was announced that Villella would executive produce the fifth installment of the Scream franchise, alongside Kevin Williamson with Bettinelli-Olpin and Gillett co-directing. The film was released on January 14, 2022.

In 2024, Villella left Radio Silence.

== Filmography ==
Film	Year	Actor	Writer	Producer	Director	Notes
Chad, Matt & Rob	2011	Yes	Yes	Yes	Yes	
V/H/S	2012	Yes	Yes	Yes	Yes	Segment "10/31/98"
Devil's Due	2014	No	No	Yes	No	
Southbound	2015	Yes	No	Yes	Yes	
Ready or Not	2019	No	No	Yes	No	
V/H/S/94	2021	No	No	Yes	No	
Scream	2022	No	No	Yes	No	
V/H/S/99	2022	No	No	Yes	No	
Scream VI	2023	No	No	Yes	No	
V/H/S/85	2023	No	No	Yes	No	
Abigail	2024	No	No	Yes	No	
Sweet Revenge	2025	No	No	Executive	No	Short film
Scream 7	2026	No	No	Executive	No	
Ready or Not 2: Here I Come	2026	No	No	Executive	No	
The Memory Thief	TBD	No	Yes	No	No	
