= Radio Silence Productions =

American filmmaking collective

- Type: Private
- Industry: Film; Television
- Predecessor: Chad, Matt & Rob
- Founded: 2011; 15 years ago
- Founders: Matt Bettinelli-Olpin; Tyler Gillett; Justin Martinez; Chad Villella
- Headquarters: Los Angeles, California, United States
- Key people: Matt Bettinelli-Olpin; Tyler Gillett
- Website: hiradiosilence.com

Radio Silence Productions is an American film and television production company, originally founded as a film collective in 2011 by Matt Bettinelli-Olpin, Tyler Gillett, Justin Martinez and Chad Villella. The group is known for the horror films Ready or Not, Scream, Scream VI and Abigail, as well as their previous work together as Chad, Matt & Rob.

== Members ==
Radio Silence was formed in 2011 by Matt Bettinelli-Olpin, Tyler Gillett, Justin Martinez and Chad Villella. The collective had worked together previously as Chad, Matt & Rob and were known for their blend of comedy, adventure, sci-fi and horror. Martinez and Villella later left the group.

- Matt Bettinelli-Olpin is originally from Oakland, California. He is the founding guitarist of punk band Link 80 and a graduate of the University of California, Santa Cruz.
- Tyler Gillett is originally from Flagstaff, Arizona, and a graduate of the University of Arizona.

== Film ==
=== V/H/S ===
The Radio Silence segment of V/H/S titled 10/31/98 is set on Halloween as a group of friends go in search for a Halloween party. According to an interview with Complex, Radio Silence was brought into the V/H/S fold after producer Brad Miska saw Mountain Devil Prank Fails Horribly. Their segment was shot over four days around Los Angeles in August 2011.

The film was purchased at the 2012 Sundance Film Festival by Magnolia Pictures for slightly over $1 million. Limited theatrical release began October 5, 2012 in the United States and November 1, 2012 in Argentina. It was released onto DVD, Blu-ray, and digital download on December 4, 2012, and a limited edition VHS version was released on February 5, 2013.

=== Devil's Due ===
In 2014, the group's horror film Devil's Due was released on January 17, 2014, by 20th Century Fox. Made for $7 million, the film went on to gross $36.9 million. Director Eli Roth was vocal in his support of the film and in a series of posts on his official Twitter account, wrote "Don't pre-judge Devil's Due because Rosemary's Baby is a 'holy grail' movie. It's so smart, creative, inventive, and fun. Very very scary. The guys at Radio Silence killed it. Devil's Due is a legit scary, smart, horror film. So many awesome scenes. I loved it." Scott Weinberg of Fearnet described the film as "a darkly passionate homage to Rosemary's Baby, the similarities are both intentional and affectionate."

=== Southbound ===
Southbound premiered at the 2015 Toronto International Film Festival and released theatrically by the Orchard on February 5, 2016. The New York Times' Neil Genzlinger gave the film a positive review and wrote "Its five segments do what they're supposed to do—unsettle you—but as a bonus, they also leave you wanting more. These are fragments more than complete stories, and the incompleteness is its own kind of creepiness. The filmmakers aren't after tidy tales, neatly connected and concluded. They know that the human mind finds loose ends unnerving." Richard Roeper of the Chicago Sun-Times, who wrote that "It's one of the smartest and scariest movies in recent memory" and Rolling Stone's David Ehrlich wrote that the movie was "Like episodes of Twilight Zone that a baked Rod Serling might have written after watching Carnival of Souls, these chapters are eerie to the extreme, and seedy enough to make you feel like you're watching something you were never meant to see. It gets under your skin because it knows there's nothing scarier than realizing that—no matter how far you drive—the evil in your rearview mirror is always closer than it appears."

=== Ready or Not ===
Ready or Not is a 2019 American black comedy horror film directed by Matt Bettinelli-Olpin and Tyler Gillett from a screenplay by Guy Busick and R. Christopher Murphy. The film stars Samara Weaving as a newlywed who becomes hunted by her spouse's family as part of their wedding night ritual. Mark O'Brien portrays her husband, with Adam Brody, Henry Czerny, and Andie MacDowell as members of his family. Ready or Not had its world premiere at the Fantasia International Film Festival on July 27, 2019, and was theatrically released on August 21, 2019 by Fox Searchlight Pictures. It grossed over $57 million against a $6 million budget, making just under 29 million both domestically and overseas. The film has received generally positive reviews from critics, for its blend of subversive humor and crowd pleasing thrills.

=== Phobias ===
Phobias is a 2021 anthology horror film which was executive produced by Radio Silence and was released on March 19, 2021 by Vertical Entertainment.

=== V/H/S/94 ===
In June 2020, it was announced that a reboot of the V/H/S franchise was in development, with a fourth installment titled V/H/S/94. The film had its world premiere at Fantastic Fest on September 26, 2021. The film was released on Shudder on October 6, 2021.

=== Scream (2022) ===
In March 2020, it was announced that Matt Bettinelli-Olpin and Tyler Gillett would direct and Chad Villella would executive produce the fifth installment of the Scream franchise and that the film was currently in development. In June 2020, Variety reported that the film was set to be distributed by Paramount Pictures. The film was released on January 14, 2022.

=== V/H/S/99 ===
V/H/S/99 is a 2022 anthology horror film which is co-produced by Radio Silence and was released on October 20, 2022 by Shudder.

=== Scream VI ===
Scream VI, a sequel to the 2022 film was released on March 10, 2023 by Paramount Pictures.

=== V/H/S/85 ===
V/H/S/85 is a 2023 anthology horror film which was produced by Radio Silence and was released on October 6, 2023 by Shudder.

== Digital ==
=== Chad, Matt & Rob ===
The group first worked together on a series of Interactive Adventures and a found footage short film called Mountain Devil Prank Fails Horribly for the Chad, Matt & Rob website.

=== The Crawl ===
On Halloween 2016, the trio premiered their first podcast titled The Crawl with Radio Silence described as "In-depth conversations with film and TV artists of all stripes for a behind-the-scenes look at some of the most interesting and overlooked careers in entertainment." The Crawl is co-hosted by Thom Newell, and recorded & edited by Anselm Kennedy.

== Feature films ==
=== Film ===
Release date	Film	Director(s)	Distributor(s)
October 5, 2012	V/H/S	Adam Wingard; David Bruckner; Ti West; Glenn McQuaid; Joe Swanberg; Radio Silence	Magnet Releasing
January 17, 2014	Devil's Due	Matt Bettinelli-Olpin; Tyler Gillett	20th Century Fox
February 5, 2016	Southbound	Roxanne Benjamin; David Bruckner; Patrick Horvath; Radio Silence	The Orchard
August 21, 2019	Ready or Not	Matt Bettinelli-Olpin; Tyler Gillett	Fox Searchlight Pictures
March 19, 2021	Phobias	Camilla Belle; Maritte Lee Go; Chris von Hoffmann; Joe Sill; Jess Varley	Vertical Entertainment
October 6, 2021	V/H/S/94	Jennifer Reeder; Chloe Okuno; Simon Barrett; Timo Tjahjanto; Ryan Prows; Steven Kostanski	Shudder
January 14, 2022	Scream	Matt Bettinelli-Olpin; Tyler Gillett	Paramount Pictures
October 20, 2022	V/H/S/99	Johannes Roberts; Vanessa Winter; Joseph Winter; Maggie Levin; Tyler MacIntyre; Flying Lotus	Shudder
March 10, 2023	Scream VI	Matt Bettinelli-Olpin; Tyler Gillett	Paramount Pictures
October 6, 2023	V/H/S/85	David Bruckner; Scott Derrickson; Gigi Saul Guerrero; Natasha Kermani; Mike P. Nelson	Shudder
April 19, 2024	Abigail	Matt Bettinelli-Olpin; Tyler Gillett	Universal Pictures
May 23, 2025	Fountain of Youth	Guy Ritchie	Apple TV+
June 20, 2025	Found Footage: The Making of the Patterson Project	Max Tzannes	Vertical
March 20, 2026	Ready or Not 2: Here I Come	Matt Bettinelli-Olpin; Tyler Gillett	Searchlight Pictures

=== Upcoming films ===
Release date	Film	Director(s)	Distributor(s)
October 15, 2027	The Mummy: Book of the Dead	Matt Bettinelli-Olpin; Tyler Gillett	Universal Pictures
—N/a	Loser	Colleen McGuinness	TBA
—N/a	Thud	Mali Elfman	TBA
—N/a	White Elephant	Eli Craig	TBA

=== In development ===
Film	Director(s)	Distributor(s)
Be Mine	Lauren Miller Rogen	TBA
Choose Your Own Adventure	Matt Bettinelli-Olpin; Tyler Gillett	20th Century Studios
Man Vs.	Justin Martinez	TBA
Reunion	TBA	Metro-Goldwyn-Mayer
The Robots Go Crazy	TBA	Amazon MGM Studios
Untitled Art Bell biopic	TBA	TBA

== Short films ==
Release date	Film	Director(s)	Distributor(s)
August 23, 2024	Full Moon Glory Hole	Thom Newell	Screambox

== Television series ==
=== In development ===
Year	Series	Creators(s)	Network(s)
TBA	The Butcher & the Wren	Jennifer Yale	TBA
TBA	Taylor Lautner: Werewolf Hunter	Daisy Gardner	Amazon Prime Video
