= Tyler Gillett =

American film director and cinematographer (born 1982)

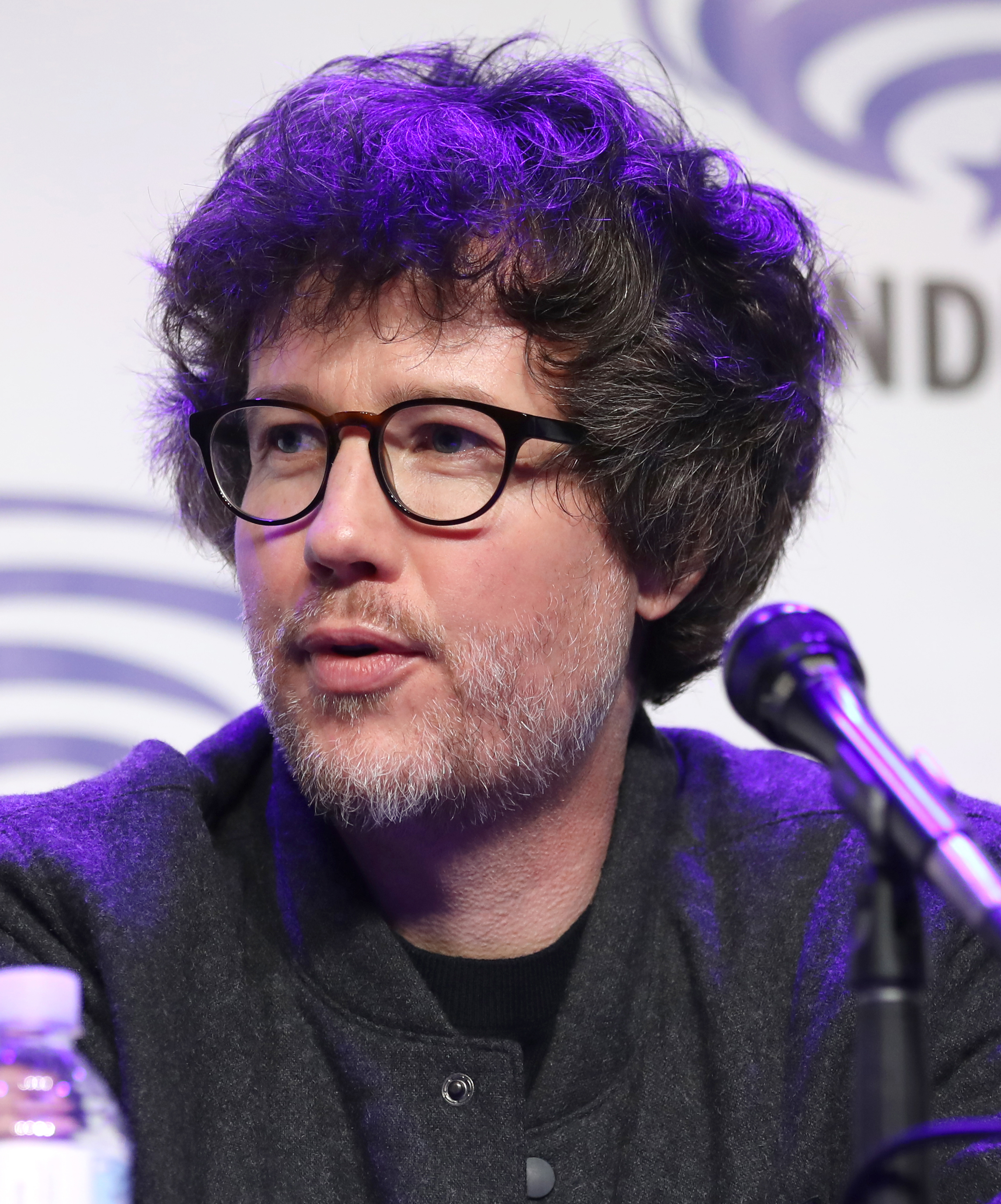
- Gillett at the 2024 WonderCon
- Born: March 6, 1982 (age 44); Flagstaff, Arizona, U.S.
- Occupations: Director; cinematographer; screenwriter; producer • actor
- Years active: 2009–present

Tyler Gillett (born March 6, 1982) is an American film director, cinematographer, actor, writer, and producer. A co-creator of the filmmaking collective Radio Silence, Gillett co-directed, with Matt Bettinelli-Olpin, the horror films Devil's Due (2014), Ready or Not (2019), Scream (2022), Scream VI (2023), and Abigail (2024). In 2026, Gillett was included on New York Magazine's list of The 100 Most Powerful Directors in Hollywood and The Hollywood Reporter's list Top Genre Filmmakers of 2026: From Curry Barker to Guillermo del Toro.

== Early life and education ==
Born and raised in Flagstaff, Arizona, Gillett earned dual BFAs in film production and studio art, photography, from the University of Arizona in 2004.

== Career ==
=== Film ===
Gillett began his film career in the camera department on the Will Ferrell film Semi-Pro. After working as a camera loader, operator and then DP, he began directing short films with comedians from The Groundlings and Upright Citizens Brigade Theatre, and later directed, produced and edited the series Domesticating, Funny in Love and Books, for Fremantle Media.

==== Chad, Matt & Rob ====
In 2009, Gillett began working with Matt Bettinelli-Olpin and Chad Villella as part of the collective Chad, Matt & Rob. Gillett co-directed, co-produced, co-wrote, co-edited and worked as cinematographer on three interactive adventure shorts – The Birthday Party, The Teleporter and The Treasure Hunt – as well as the found footage horror short Mountain Devil Prank Fails Horribly. The group became known for their signature style, which blended adventure, comedy, sci-fi and horror, and received nearly 100,000,000 views online.

==== Radio Silence ====
After the dissolution of Chad, Matt & Rob, Gillett formed Radio Silence with Bettinelli-Olpin, Villella and Justin Martinez. The group co-directed the "10/31/98" segment of the horror feature film V/H/S. V/H/S premiered at the 2012 Sundance Film Festival, where it was acquired by Magnolia Pictures, and released theatrically on October 5, 2012.

With Bettinelli-Olpin, Gillett directed Devil's Due, a 2014 horror feature film from Twentieth Century Fox and Davis Entertainment. Their film Southbound premiered at the 2015 Toronto International Film Festival and was released theatrically by the Orchard on February 5, 2016. Paul Thomas Anderson called the film "a hidden gem."

In 2019, Gillett co-directed the well-reviewed comedic thriller Ready or Not with Matt Bettinelli-Olpin for Fox Searchlight, starring Samara Weaving, Adam Brody, Andie MacDowell, and Mark O'Brien. The film was nominated for Best Horror Film at the 46th Saturn Awards.

In March 2020, it was announced that Gillett would co-direct Scream, the fifth installment of the Scream franchise, alongside Matt Bettinelli-Olpin, with Kevin Williamson serving as executive producer. The film was released on January 14, 2022. The film was nominated for Best Movie at the 2023 MTV Movie & TV Awards.

In 2022, Bettinelli-Olpin and Gillett directed Scream VI which was released on March 10, 2023, by Paramount Pictures. The film won Best Movie at the 2023 MTV Movie & TV Awards and ranked #3 on The Hollywood Reporter's list of "The Best Slasher Movies of the Decade".

In 2023, Bettinelli-Olpin and Gillett directed Abigail which was released on April 19, 2024, by Universal Pictures. The film was nominated for Best Wide Release Movie at the 2024 Fangoria Chainsaw Awards. and included on many best of 2024 lists including Variety's "The Best Horror Movies of 2024", Screen Rant's "10 Best Horror Movies Of 2024", Bloody Disgusting's "The 10 Best Horror Movies Released in the First Half of 2024", Time Out's "The Best Horror Movies of 2024" and SlashFilm's "The 19 Best Horror Movies Of 2024 So Far".

Gillett is also a producer on V/H/S, V/H/S/94, V/H/S/99 and V/H/S/85.

=== Reply All ===
Gillett appeared in a March 2020 episode of the podcast Reply All, "The Case of the Missing Hit", in which he asked the podcasts' hosts for help in identifying a song he had heard on mainstream radio in the 1990s, but of which there was barely any trace on the internet. In the episode, Reply All host P.J. Vogt goes to great lengths to try to identify the song, including interviewing a variety of music industry notables and hiring a group of musicians to record the song based on Gillett's recollection. The episode was both popular and critically acclaimed, with The Guardian calling it "perhaps the best-ever episode of any podcast".

== Filmography ==
Film	Year	Director	Writer	Cinematographer	Editor	Actor	Producer	Notes
Chad, Matt & Rob	2011	Yes	Yes	Yes	Yes	Yes	Yes	Role: Himself
V/H/S	2012	Yes	Yes	Yes	Yes	Yes	Yes	Segment "10/31/98", Role: Tyler
Devil's Due	2014	Yes	No	Yes	No	No	No	
Southbound	2015	Yes	No	Yes	Yes	No	Yes	
Ready or Not	2019	Yes	No	No	No	No	No	
Phobias	2021	No	No	No	No	No	Executive	
V/H/S/94	2021	No	No	No	No	No	Yes	
Scream	2022	Yes	No	No	No	No	No	
V/H/S/99	2022	No	No	No	No	No	Yes	
Scream VI	2023	Yes	No	No	No	No	No	
V/H/S/85	2023	No	No	No	No	No	Yes	
Abigail	2024	Yes	No	No	No	No	No	
Fountain of Youth	2025	No	No	No	No	No	Executive	
Scream 7	2026	No	No	No	No	No	Executive	
Ready or Not 2: Here I Come	2026	Yes	No	No	No	No	Executive	
The Mummy: Book of the Dead	2027	Yes	No	No	No	No	No	Filming
White Elephant	TBA	No	No	No	No	No	Yes	

== Awards and nominations ==
Year	Award	Category	Work	Result
2012	SXSW	Midnight Audience Award (shared with Ti West, Adam Wingard, et al.)	V/H/S	Nominated
2012	Sitges Film Festival	Best Motion Picture	V/H/S	Nominated
2012	Golden Schmoes Awards	Best Horror Movie	V/H/S	Nominated
2016	iHorror	Best Direct Release Horror(shared with David Bruckner, Roxanne Benjamin, et al.)	Southbound	Nominated
2019	Sitges Film Festival	Best Motion Picture	Ready or Not	Nominated
2019	Fright Meter Awards	Best Horror Movie	Ready or Not	Nominated
2019	Golden Schmoes Awards	Best Horror Movie	Ready or Not	Nominated
2019	Golden Schmoes Awards	Biggest Surprise of the Year	Ready or Not	Nominated
2019	IGN Summer Movie Awards	Best Horror Movie	Ready or Not	Nominated
2019	Fantasy Filmfest	Best 1st or 2nd Feature	Ready or Not	Nominated
2019	St. Louis Film Critics Association Awards	Best Horror Film	Ready or Not	Nominated
2020	Fangoria Chainsaw Awards	Best Wide Release	Ready or Not	Nominated
2020	Hollywood Critics Association Film Awards	Best Horror Film	Ready or Not	Nominated
2020	Hawaii Film Critics Society Awards	Best Horror Film	Ready or Not	Nominated
2020	Columbus Film Critics Association Awards	Best Overlooked Film	Ready or Not	2nd Place
2020	Music City Film Critics Association Awards	Best Horror Film	Ready or Not	Nominated
2021	Saturn Awards	Best Horror Film	Ready or Not	Nominated
2021	Academy of Science Fiction, Fantasy & Horror Films	Best Horror Film	Ready or Not	Nominated
2022	MTV Movie & TV Awards	Best Movie	Scream (2022)	Nominated
2022	People's Choice Awards	Best Movie	Scream (2022)	Nominated
2022	Hollywood Critics Association Midseason Film Awards	Best Horror	Scream (2022)	Nominated
2022	The Queerties	Best Studio Movie	Scream (2022)	Nominated
2022	St. Louis Film Critics Association Awards	Best Horror Film	Scream (2022)	Nominated
2022	GLAAD Media Awards	Outstanding Film Wide Theatrical Release	Scream (2022)	Nominated
2022	Saturn Awards	Best Horror Film	Scream (2022)	Nominated
2023	MTV Movie & TV Awards	Best Movie	Scream VI	Won
2023	Hollywood Critics Association Midseason Film Awards	Best Horror	Scream VI	Nominated
2023	Saturn Awards	Best Horror Film	Scream VI	Nominated
2023	MTV Millennial Awards	Best Movie	Scream VI	Nominated
2024	People's Choice Awards	The Drama Movie of the Year	Scream VI	Nominated
2024	Academy of Science Fiction, Fantasy & Horror Films	Best Horror Film	Scream VI	Nominated
2024	Critics' Choice Super Awards	Best Horror Movie	Scream VI	Nominated
2024	Golden Schmoes Awards	Best Horror Movie	Scream VI	Nominated
2024	Music City Film Critics' Association Awards	Best Horror Film	Scream VI	Nominated
2024	Astra Film Awards	Best Horror Feature	Scream VI	Nominated
2024	DiscussingFilm Critic Awards	Best Horror Film	Scream VI	Nominated
2024	Fangoria Chainsaw Awards	Best Wide Release	Abigail	Nominated
2024	7th Astra Midseason Movie Awards	Best Horror Movie	Abigail	Nominated
2025	Saturn Awards	Best Horror Movie	Abigail	Nominated
