= Justin Martinez (filmmaker) =

American film director (born 1980)

- Born: July 14, 1980 (age 46); Tucson, Arizona, U.S.
- Occupations: Film Director, Cinematographer, VFX Artist, Writer, Producer
- Years active: 2011–present

Justin Martinez (born July 14, 1980) is an American film director, cinematographer, visual effects artist, writer and producer. He is a co-creator of Radio Silence, known for their work on the films V/H/S, Devil's Due, and Southbound.

== Biography ==
=== Radio Silence ===
In 2011, Martinez formed Radio Silence with Tyler Gillett, Matt Bettinelli-Olpin and Chad Villella. The group co-directed and co-wrote the 10/31/98 segment of the feature film V/H/S. Radio Silence was brought on to direct a segment for V/H/S after producer Brad Miska saw Mountain Devil Prank Fails Horribly, a found footage short that Martinez created with the group Chad, Matt & Rob. V/H/S premiered at the 2012 Sundance Film Festival It was released theatrically by Magnolia Pictures in October 2012.

In 2013, Radio Silence made Devil's Due for 20th Century Fox. The movie was produced by John Davis and released theatrically in January 2014 to a worldwide audience. Martinez is credited as the Executive Producer, Cinematographer, and Visual Effects Supervisor on the movie.

In 2015, their film Southbound premiered at the Toronto International Film Festival. The movie was picked up for distribution by the Orchard for release in February 2016.

In 2020, Martinez co-produced the Facebook Watch animated series Woman in the Book, which was inspired by his 2016 short film of the same name. The original short was written and directed by him for CryptTV and produced by Allison Vanore.

In 2021, Martinez received a nomination for the 47th Daytime Emmy Awards in the category of Outstanding Main Title and Graphic Design for a Live-Action Program.

In July 2024, he was confirmed to direct a segment for V/H/S/Beyond, which was released exclusively on Shudder on October 4, 2024.

== Filmography ==
- V/H/S (2012)
- Devil's Due (2014)
- Southbound (2015)
- V/H/S/Beyond (2024) segment: Live and Let Dive
