= Chad, Matt & Rob =

American comedy troupe

Comedy career
- Years active: 2007–2011
- Genres: Comedy; horror; adventure; sci-fi
- Former members: Matt Bettinelli-Olpin; Tyler Gillett; Jonah Goldstein; Justin Martinez; Rob Polonsky; Chad Villella

YouTube information
- Channel: chadmattandrob
- Years active: 2007–present
- Genre: Entertainment
- Subscribers: 129 thousand
- Views: 69.3 million
- Last updated: October 14, 2024
- Website: Official Website

Chad, Matt & Rob was an American group of filmmakers based in Los Angeles known for their short films that blend comedy with horror, adventure, and sci-fi.

Their most notable works include a series of Prank Gone Wrong found footage videos and a collection of Choose Your Own Adventure-style films known as Chad, Matt & Rob's Interactive Adventures.

== History ==
Chad, Matt & Rob formed in early 2007 by Chad Villella, Matt Bettinelli-Olpin and Rob Polonsky.

Their breakout short, the found footage style Alien Roommate Prank Goes Bad, was released in February 2008 and has been viewed over 30,000,000 times.

In November 2008, the group began making a series of Choose Your Own Adventure-style films (they coined the term "Interactive Adventures" to describe the series). The Time Machine: An Interactive Adventure was the first interactive movie on YouTube and featured in The Wall Street Journal and on G4's "Attack of the Show."

Justin Martinez and Tyler Gillett joined in 2010 and, in 2011, Polonsky left the group. The remaining four changed their collective name to Radio Silence.

== Members ==
- Chad Villella is originally from Punxsutawney, Pennsylvania, and a graduate of Mercyhurst College and an original member of the Center for Information Research Analysis And Training (CIRAT).
- Matt Bettinelli-Olpin is originally from Oakland, California, and founding member of the punk band Link 80. He is a graduate of the University of California, Santa Cruz.
- Rob Polonsky is originally from Buffalo Grove, Illinois, and a graduate of Columbia College Chicago.
- Tyler Gillett is originally from Flagstaff, Arizona, and a graduate of the University of Arizona.
- Justin Martinez is originally from Tucson, Arizona, and a graduate of the University of Arizona.
- Jonah Goldstein is originally from New Jersey and currently runs the "Chattin' w/ Joni" blog on the Lonely Island website.

Recurring cast members include Tyler Tuione, Chester Tam and Kal Penn.

== Pranks Gone Wrong ==
The group are known for their popular found footage-style "Pranks Gone Wrong" series.

- Chad Hates Aliens (also known as Roommate Alien Prank Goes Bad) was released February 25, 2008 and was the group's first viral video. As of September 2021, it has over 34 million views, was featured on Attack of the Show and was accepted into the 2008 Comic-Con International Film Festival.
- Let's Go Meet Some Animals! (Prank Fails Horribly) was released September 9, 2008. The group goes to the Los Angeles Zoo and discovers a monster.
- Mountain Devil Prank Fails Horribly was released April 22, 2010. The short revolves around the Lone Pine Mountain Devil, a creature the group created for the film.

== Interactive Adventures ==
Chad, Matt & Rob coined the term "Interactive Adventure" to describe their 2008 film The Time Machine: An Interactive Adventure; the project was the first interactive movie of its kind. As of March 2012, Chad, Matt & Rob have produced five Interactive Adventures.

- The Time Machine (November 11, 2008) is the first narrative Choose Your Own Adventure-style film on the Internet. When deciding on a title for the finished film, they coined the term "Interactive Adventure." The series contains nine segments and follows the boys as they travel through the centuries in a time machine disguised as a trash can, all while running from government agents seeking to get the time machine back. At the end of each segment, the viewer is able to choose which video to go to next using YouTube's "annotation" feature. The series received over 1,000,000 views during its first week, was featured on Entertainment Weekly's The Must List and won the Best Multimedia Fiction Award at the 2009 Cinéma Tout Ecran International Film Festival in Geneva.
- The Murder (March 14, 2009) is the group's second Interactive Adventure. In The Murder, Chad, Matt & Rob witness a murder while they are filming a short and must decide how to proceed. The narrative expands on the single-story thread used for "The Time Machine" and allows the viewer to follow three unique story-lines. In all, the project contains over 30 separate segments.
- The Birthday Party (January 15, 2010) is the group's third Interactive Adventure. In The Birthday Party, the trio must run from a gang, battle zombies in a haunted hospital and save a kidnapped heiress from an urban militia, all while attempting to reach their boss's birthday party alive. The group shot the project around Los Angeles in four days, including the Linda Vista Community Hospital.
- The Teleporter (November 22, 2010) is the group's fourth Interactive Adventure. The project, in which Chad, Matt & Rob are on the run from an angry UFO that wants its teleporter back, represents the group's first foray into branded content; it was made in conjunction with Unilever to promote a line of AXE shampoo products. According to a Tubefilter interview, the group was wary of selling out their audience; "We've always been really wary on doing any sort of brand integration," said [Rob] Polonsky. "Viewers are always super sensitive when there's any sort of product placement involved. The last thing we wanted to do was to insult our audience. So we wrote something that we would want to make." As of March 2011, the film's 10 segments have a combined 1,000,000 views.
- The Treasure Hunt (January 26, 2011) is the group's fifth Interactive Adventure. The story follows the trio as they battle a menacing treasure hunter searching for a long lost treasure and co-stars Alfonso Arau (known for The Wild Bunch, Three Amigos and as the director of Like Water for Chocolate). A rough cut of the film screened at the 2010 Anaheim International Film Festival and the finish product premiered at the Prescott Film Festival in February 2011, where audience applause was used to choose which path the narrative would take.

== Filmography ==
- READY OR NOT Redband Trailer! - released August 19, 2019.
- SOUTHBOUND Trailer! - released February 10, 2016.
- A Big Thank You, A Quick Update & The V/H/S Trailer! - released August 2, 2012.
- The Treasure Hunt: An Interactive Adventure - released January 26, 2011. (9 segments & 2 Easter eggs)
- The Teleporter: An Interactive Adventure - released November 22, 2010. (10 segments total)
- The Teleporter: An Interactive Adventure (Trailer) - released November 12, 2010.
- The Treasure Hunt: An Interactive Adventure (Trailer) - released August 5, 2010.
- Mountain Devil Prank Fails Horribly - released April 22, 2010.
- How To Make An Interactive Adventure - released February 17, 2010.
- The Birthday Party: An Interactive Adventure - released January 15, 2010. (10 segments & 3 Easter eggs)
- The Birthday Party: Trailer #2 - released December 11, 2009.
- The Birthday Party: Trailer #1 - released December 9, 2009.
- Magic! - released August 20, 2009.
- The Murder: An Interactive Adventure - released March 14, 2009. (26 segments total)
- The Time Machine: An Interactive Adventure - released November 11, 2008. (9 segments total)
- Let's Go Meet Some Animals! - released September 9, 2008.
- The Alibuys: The Cheater - released August 9, 2008.
- The Alibuys: The Kidnapping - released August 1, 2008.
- The Alibuys: Drug Dealers Have Parents, Too - released August 1, 2008.
- "We're The Alibuys!" (public-access television cable TV Commercial) - released July 9, 2008.
- The Alibuys: Trailer #1 - released May 19, 2008.
- No Spoofs For Old Men - released May 9, 2008.
- Happy Birthday - released April 15, 2008.
- Chad Hates Aliens (also known as Roommate Alien Prank Goes Bad) - released February 25, 2008.
- The Danger Zone - released February 18, 2008.
- Prison Break - released January 10, 2008.
- Happy Halloween - released October 23, 2007.
- Cops & Robbers! - released September 22, 2007.
- Smoke Break - released September 3, 2007.
- Television Man - released September 3, 2007.
- I Believe I Can Fly - released July 21, 2007.
- Good Roommates - released July 16, 2007.
- A Terrible Place - released July 2007 (subsequently removed).
