= V/H/S =

2012 American film

- Theatrical release poster
- Directed by: Adam Wingard ("Tape 56"); David Bruckner ("Amateur Night"); Ti West ("Second Honeymoon"); Glenn McQuaid ("Tuesday the 17th"); Joe Swanberg ("The Sick Thing That Happened to Emily When She Was Younger"); Radio Silence ("10/31/98")
- Written by: Simon Barrett ("Tape 56"); David Bruckner ("Amateur Night"); Nicholas Tecosky; Ti West ("Second Honeymoon"); Glenn McQuaid ("Tuesday the 17th"); Matt Bettinelli-Olpin; Tyler Gillett; Justin Martinez; Chad Villella ("10/31/98")
- Produced by: Simon Barrett (segments "Tape 56", "The Sick Thing That Happened to Emily When She Was Younger"); Gary Binkow; Brad Miska; Roxanne Benjamin
- Starring: see below
- Cinematography: Adam Wingard; Glenn McQuaid; Radio Silence; Ti West; Victoria K. Warren; Andrew Droz Palermo
- Edited by: David Bruckner; Glenn McQuaid; Ti West; Simon Barrett; Matt Bettinelli-Olpin; Tyler Gillett
- Music by: Lucas Clyde
- Production companies: Bloody Disgusting; The Collective
- Distributed by: Magnet Releasing
- Release dates: January 22, 2012 (Sundance); October 5, 2012 (United States)
- Running time: 116 minutes
- Country: United States
- Language: English
- Box office: $1.9 million

V/H/S is a 2012 American found footage horror anthology film and the first installment in the V/H/S franchise created by Brad Miska and Bloody Disgusting, and produced by Miska and Roxanne Benjamin. It features a series of six found footage shorts written and directed by Adam Wingard, David Bruckner, Ti West, Glenn McQuaid, Joe Swanberg, and the filmmaking collective Radio Silence.

The film premiered at the 2012 Sundance Film Festival in January 2012, and was released on demand on August 31, 2012. It also made a limited theatrical release in the United States on October 5, 2012, and in the United Kingdom on January 18, 2013.

The franchise includes five sequels (V/H/S/2, V/H/S: Viral, V/H/S/Beyond, V/H/S/Halloween and V/H/S/Mixtape), three prequels (V/H/S/85, V/H/S/94 and V/H/S/99), two individual spin-off films, (Siren and Kids vs. Aliens), and a miniseries (V/H/S: Video Horror Shorts) on Snapchat's Snap Originals platform.

== Genesis ==
In an interview with IndieWire, producer Brad Miska revealed the process in which they developed V/H/S, which included a "trust-fall" style of filmmaking. All of the relationships came through the long history of Bloody Disgusting.

For "V/H/S", we went to people that I have a relationship with via Bloody Disgusting — a group of trusted filmmakers who we thought would want to take part in this. They pitched us their ideas, then came to us with treatments and scripts. It was like, "If you like this, go do your thing." In terms of the movie itself getting green lit — the storyline that runs through the whole movie was something that we had originally discussed. So we just went with the decided upon streamlined story and just let the filmmakers go do their thing. Which is kind of a reverse of how you're supposed to do a movie like this. You're supposed to do that last. It became a 'fill-in-the-hole' type project. What can we put here? What can we put there? You know, what would amp it up here? So it was a living project. A living film if you will.

== Plot ==
The film is presented as an anthology of five short horror films, built into a frame narrative which acts as its own sixth short horror film.

=== "Tape 56" (frame narrative) — Prologue ===
- Written by Adam Wingard and Simon Barrett
- Directed by Adam Wingard

The frame narrative focuses on Brad, Rox, Zak, and Gary, a criminal gang who film their acts, which range from vandalizing an empty house, to sexually assaulting a woman in a parking garage. An anonymous source hires them to break into the house of an old man and steal a VHS tape. The quartet accepts, eager to expand their criminal enterprises.

Inside the house, they find the corpse of the old man sitting in front of several televisions broadcasting white noise. While his friends roam the house, Brad stays with the old man's corpse to watch a tape left in the VCR.

=== "Amateur Night" ===
- Written by David Bruckner and Nicholas Tecosky
- Directed by David Bruckner

Three friends, Shane, Patrick, and Clint, rent a hotel room with the intention of inviting women for sexual intercourse. Clint wears glasses that have been outfitted with a hidden camera and microphone to allow the trio to turn their planned encounter into an amateur porn video.

While he and his friends are bar-hopping, Clint meets Lily, a mysterious young woman who appears unusually shy and only says "I like you" to him. In addition to Lily, the friends also convince another young woman, Lisa, to go to their room. Back at the motel, Shane attempts to initiate sex with Lisa, but she passes out in a drunken stupor, prompting Patrick to discourage him. Lily awkwardly seduces Clint until Shane comes on to her instead.

While Lily's clothes get forcefully taken off of her, Clint notices that her feet are clawed and scaly, but Shane and Patrick are oblivious. Lily pushes Shane onto his back and begins to undress Clint to apparently initiate a threesome. Overwhelmed, Clint goes to the bathroom. Patrick attempts to take Clint's place, but Lily makes it clear that she dislikes him. Moments later, Patrick bursts into the bathroom with a large wound on his hand, claiming that Lily bit him.

When Clint and Patrick confront her, Lily suddenly sprouts fangs and screams at them, attacking and killing Shane while Clint and Patrick retreat to the bathroom. Patrick, armed with a shower curtain rod, returns to the bedroom. Clint tries to wake Lisa while Patrick confronts Lily, but she easily kills him and tears off his genitalia. Clint runs out of the room, but falls down a staircase and breaks his wrist. Lily, her face now monstrous, catches up to Clint. She attempts to perform fellatio on Clint, but starts to cry and growl angrily when he remains unresponsive.

Clint flees the building and begs bystanders for help, until he is suddenly lifted into the sky by Lily - who has now transformed into a demonic winged creature. The video glasses fall off Clint's face and hit the ground as the footage ends.

=== "Tape 56" — First interlude ===
In the basement, Zak and Gary find hundreds of unmarked VHS tapes, and decide to collect them all to make sure they retrieve the correct one. Zak spots a glimpse of what appears to be a naked man wandering deeper into the basement, but Gary does not believe him.

Returning to the television room, Brad has mysteriously disappeared. Rox, not addressing this, puts another tape into the VCR.

=== "Second Honeymoon" ===
- Written and directed by Ti West

Married couple Sam and Stephanie travel through Route 66 for their second honeymoon in Arizona, documenting the trip using a camcorder. That night, they visit "Wild West Junction", a Wild West-themed attraction, where Stephanie receives a prediction from a mechanical fortune teller. The prediction claims that she will soon be reunited with a loved one. After returning to their motel room, a disagreement between the couple is interrupted by a knock at their door. Sam investigates off-camera, speaking with a young woman who asks if the pair can give her a ride the next day.

In the middle of the night, while the couple are asleep, an intruder breaks into the room, turns on the camcorder, and films themselves stroking Stephanie's buttocks with a switchblade. The intruder also steals money from Sam's wallet, and dips his toothbrush in the toilet.

The next day, en route to the Grand Canyon, Sam notices the missing money and accuses Stephanie of taking it, despite her assurance that she did not. That night, the intruder returns and repeatedly stabs Sam in the neck with the switchblade, filming him as he chokes to death on his blood. The camcorder then cuts to show that the intruder is the woman who approached the motel room the previous evening, wearing a plastic mask. The unnamed woman, referred to in credits only as "Girl", is revealed to be Stephanie's lover. The camcorder then cuts to the women driving away, with Stephanie asking her lover if she erased the tape as the footage ends.

=== "Tape 56" — Second interlude ===
Rox fails to notice that the old man's corpse behind him has disappeared, and places the next tape into the VCR. Meanwhile, in the basement, Zak and Gary discuss what might be on the tape they're looking for, and consider making copies of it to sell.

=== "Tuesday the 17th" ===
- Written and directed by Glenn McQuaid

Childhood friends Joey, Spider, and Samantha accompany their new friend, Wendy, on her annual trip to a lake in a nearby forest. As Wendy leads the way, she mentions an "accident" that took the lives of her old friends. Joey's digital camera pans to empty areas of the forest, prompting glitched images of mutilated bodies to appear in the captured footage, which Joey assumes is a hardware malfunction. After the group discovers the mutilated corpse of a pig, Wendy nonchalantly declares to Joey that everyone is going to die.

As the group smoke marijuana near the lake, Wendy explains that a group of people were murdered at the lake some years prior, but the group dismisses it as a joke. Spider and Samantha separate from the group until a knife is suddenly thrown through the back of Samantha's head, killing her. Spider attempts to run, but is stabbed multiple times in the forehead. The culprit is a glitched figure obscured by tracking errors (identified as "The Glitch" in the end credits).

Wendy quickly collects the camera, appearing to have witnessed the murders. Upon her return to the lake, Joey asks her where Samantha and Spider went, to which Wendy says that they left before suddenly propositioning him. When Joey guesses that she was telling the truth about the murders, she reveals that she is the only survivor of the incident after all of her friends were killed. She further reveals that she lured the group into the woods as bait, hoping to kill the murderer. The Glitch then approaches Joey from behind and slits his throat, inciting Wendy to flee. Wendy first lures the Glitch into a pit, then into a bear trap, which briefly halts it. She tries to film the Glitch up close, but it slashes her hand before she flees again.

After losing sight of the Glitch, Wendy tells anyone who finds the recording to stay away from the forest. She comes across Joey, wandering the forest as he bleeds to death, and the Glitch confronts her as he collapses. As it does so, a bed of spikes impales it. After Wendy gloats about finally beating the killer, she looks back to see that it has disappeared. It suddenly ambushes her, beats her to death with the camera, and disembowels her corpse. Once the Glitch leaves, Wendy's body spasms violently as the footage ends.

=== "Tape 56" — Third interlude ===
The old man's corpse has returned, but Rox has now disappeared. Zak and Gary return upstairs, becoming confused as to where their friends have gone. Gary leaves to search for them, while Zak remains in the room and places another tape into the VCR.

=== "The Sick Thing That Happened to Emily When She Was Younger" ===
- Written by Simon Barrett
- Directed by Joe Swanberg

This segment is framed partially as a screenlife film.

Through a series of video chats, aspiring doctor James is told by his girlfriend Emily about a strange bump on her arm, and how it reminds her of an accident she had when she was younger. After Emily shows James around her new apartment, she hears noises outside her door, prompting her to investigate. A ghostly child-like entity rushes into her room and slams the door, leading Emily to believe her apartment is haunted.

After another encounter with the entity, Emily tells James that she questioned her landlord, who claims that no children have ever lived in the complex, nor have any people ever died there. During their next chat, Emily attempts to cut into the bump on her arm to find out what it is. James urges her to stop before the wound becomes infected, promising to check it when he visits in a week.

The next night, Emily closes her eyes and carries her laptop to have James look for the entity. It appears with two more entities, which knock her unconscious as James enters the apartment. The entities are revealed to be aliens, who watch as James surgically removes a fetus from Emily's torso, having been using her as an incubator for human-alien hybrids. James asks the aliens how much longer they plan to use Emily, stating that she may not survive much more damage and has already noticed the tracking device in her arm. The aliens erase Emily's memory, while James breaks her arm so that the event looks like an accident.

In their next chat, a badly-injured Emily is under the impression that she sustained the injuries after wandering into traffic in a fugue state. She says that the doctor James recommended diagnosed her as schizoaffective and tearfully tells him that he deserves a better, more normal girlfriend. James assures Emily that she is the only person he wants to be with as their call ends. James then begins a new call with a different woman, who also has a bump on her arm and believes he is her boyfriend, revealing that the aliens are using multiple women as incubators as the footage ends.

=== "Tape 56" — Epilogue ===
Gary returns, finding that both Zak and the old man's corpse have disappeared. He searches upstairs and finds Zak's decapitated remains, before he is suddenly attacked by the old man's corpse, which is now zombified. Upon fleeing downstairs, Gary falls and twists his ankle. The zombie approaches and attacks him. In the television room, the VCR starts the last tape by itself.

=== "10/31/98" ===
- Written and directed by Radio Silence

On Halloween night, 1998, four friends — Tyler, Chad, Matt, and Paul (respectively dressed as a nanny cam, the Unabomber, a pirate, and a Marine) — head out to a Halloween party. They travel to an incorrect address, instead arriving at what appears to be an abandoned house. Believing they are merely the first to arrive, the friends sneak inside and begin to experience paranormal phenomena, which they dismiss as being haunted house attractions.

When they reach the attic, the group finds several men gathered around a crying woman suspended from the rafters, apparently reenacting an exorcism. The group joins in the men's chanting, which alerts them to their presence. The men angrily tell the group to leave before physically assaulting the woman, causing them to suddenly be pulled into the darkness by an unseen force. As more violent paranormal phenomena manifest, the four friends initially flee, but soon return to the house to rescue the woman.

The entire house comes to life with poltergeist activity as the group races to their car with the woman, driving away. The car abruptly stops and the woman disappears, reappearing in the street before them and walking away and disappearing once more. Realizing that the car has stopped on train tracks, the group tries to escape the vehicle as a train approaches, but is unable to start the engine or unlock the doors. The approaching train collides with the car as the footage ends.

==== Alternative joke ending ====
A joke ending to "10/31/98" was shot in one take by Radio Silence, in which the car's doors are unlocked and the friends escape before the train comes. The group walks away and talk about how much fun they had, and what a crazy night it was. Meanwhile, the train collides with the car and it explodes behind them.

== Cast ==
=== "Tape 56" ===
- Calvin Reeder as Gary
- Lane Hughes as Zak
- Kentucker Audley as Rox
- Adam Wingard as Brad
- Frank Stack as Old Man
- Sarah Byrne as Abbey
- Melissa Boatright as Tabitha
- Simon Barrett as Steve
- Andrew Droz Palermo as Fifth Thug

=== "Amateur Night" ===
- Hannah Fierman as Lily
- Mike Donlan as Shane
- Joe Sykes as Patrick
- Drew Sawyer as Clint
- Jasper Lewis as Lisa

=== "Second Honeymoon" ===
- Joe Swanberg as Sam
- Sophia Takal as Stephanie
- Kate Lyn Sheil as Girl

=== "Tuesday the 17th" ===
- Norma C. Quinones as Wendy
- Drew Moerlein as Joey Brenner
- Jeannine Yoder as Samantha
- Jason Yachanin as Spider
- Bryce Burke as The Glitch

=== "The Sick Thing That Happened to Emily When She Was Younger" ===
- Helen Rogers as Emily
- Daniel Kaufman as James
- Liz Harvey as The New Girl
- Corrie Fitzpatrick as Girl Alien
- Isaiah Hillman as Boy Alien
- Taliyah Hillman as Little Girl Alien

=== "10/31/98" ===
- Chad Villella as Chad
- Matt Bettinelli-Olpin as Matt
- Tyler Gillett as Tyler
- Paul Natonek as Paul
- Nicole Erb as The Girl
- John Walcutt as Cult Leader
- Eric Curtis as Roommate

== Release ==
Trevor Groth, a programmer of midnight movies at the Sundance Film Festival, said, "I give this all the credit in the world because conceptually it shouldn't have worked for me. Personally, I'm bored by found-footage horror films, which this is. And omnibus attempts rarely work. But this one does. It's terrifying, and very well executed." Horror-Movies.ca reported that two people fainted during the premiere at Sundance.

At the 2012 Sundance Film Festival, Magnolia Pictures purchased the North American rights to the film for slightly over $1 million. The first theatrical release began in Russia on September 7, 2012. Limited theatrical release began October 5, 2012, in the United States. The film was released onto DVD, Blu-ray, and digital download on December 4, 2012. It was released on the titular format of VHS on February 5, 2013.

== Reception ==
On the review aggregator website Rotten Tomatoes, 56% of 106 critics' reviews are positive, with an average rating of 5.6/10. The website's consensus reads: "An uneven collection of found-footage horror films, V/H/S has some inventive scares but its execution is hit-and-miss." Metacritic, which uses a weighted average, assigned the film a score of 54 out of 100, based on 22 critics, indicating "mixed or average" reviews.

Most reviewers said that they felt the film was too long. Variety noted that "the segments vary in quality and the whole overstays its welcome at nearly two hours. Some trimming (perhaps relegating a weaker episode to a DVD extra) would increase theatrical chances."

Empire gave the film four stars out of five, saying that "the biggest twist is its consistently high quality ... anything goes, and all of it works". The Hollywood Reporter gave the film a mildly positive review, stating "Refreshingly, V/H/S promises no more than it delivers, always a plus with genre fare." Fangoria praised the film while remarking that "the mystery of why/how some of this stuff is even on VHS tapes to begin with" was a bit of a leap.

Sean O'Connell of The Washington Post gave the film a scathing review, saying that although "on paper, it's a clever concept" and "probably sounded great in the pitch meeting", it "loses all luster through some shoddy execution". He went on to criticise the "unwatchable shaky-cam technique" and "rough and amateurish" acting, though he did identify Swanberg's segment as the best. Likewise, Roger Ebert was among the critics who felt the film was overlong, giving the film one star out of four and saying that "None of the segments is particularly compelling. Strung together, it's way too much of a muchness."

== Sequels and spin-offs ==
A sequel, titled V/H/S/2, premiered at the 2013 Sundance Film Festival in January 2013 and was released on demand on June 6, 2013. It also made a limited theatrical release in the United States on July 12, 2013.

A third installment in the series, titled V/H/S: Viral, was released on demand on October 23, 2014, and theatrically on November 21, 2014. A fourth installment, titled V/H/S/94, was released exclusively on Shudder on October 6, 2021.

A fifth installment, V/H/S/99, debuted in the Midnight Madness stream at the 2022 Toronto International Film Festival and was released on Shudder October 20, 2022. V/H/S/85, the sixth installment, was released on Shudder on October 6, 2023. The seventh installment, V/H/S/Beyond, was released exclusively on Shudder on October 4, 2024. The eighth installment, V/H/S/Halloween, was released exclusively on Shudder October 3, 2025.

== See also ==
- List of ghost films
