= Watcher (film) =

2022 film by Chloe Okuno

- Theatrical release poster
- Directed by: Chloe Okuno
- Screenplay by: Chloe Okuno
- Based on: Screenplay by Zack Ford
- Produced by: Roy Lee; Steven Schneider; Derek Dauchy; Mason Novick; John Finemore; Aaron Kaplan; Sean Perrone
- Starring: Maika Monroe; Karl Glusman; Burn Gorman
- Cinematography: Benjamin Kirk Nielsen
- Edited by: Michael Block
- Music by: Nathan Halpern
- Production companies: Image Nation Abu Dhabi; AGC International; Spooky Pictures; Lost City
- Distributed by: IFC Midnight (United States); Universal Pictures (International)
- Release dates: January 21, 2022 (Sundance); June 3, 2022 (United States)
- Running time: 96 minutes
- Countries: United Arab Emirates; United States; Romania
- Languages: English; Romanian
- Budget: $5 million
- Box office: $3.2 million

Watcher is a 2022 psychological thriller film written and directed by Chloe Okuno, based on an original screenplay by Zack Ford. The film stars Maika Monroe, Karl Glusman, and Burn Gorman.

Watcher had its world premiere at the Sundance Film Festival on January 21, 2022, where it was nominated for the Grand Jury Prize. The film was theatrically released in the United States on June 3, 2022, to positive reviews from critics.

== Plot ==
American couple Julia and Francis relocate to Bucharest, moving into an apartment building with a large picture window. While Francis works long hours, Julia grows unnerved by a man in the building across the street, who watches her on a daily basis. Her fears are heightened when she learns of a serial killer, dubbed "the Spider" by local media, who is decapitating young women. In the city one day, she senses a man following her to a theatre and a supermarket, but when Francis and Julia visit the market to review security footage, it proves inconclusive.

Julia befriends her neighbour, Irina, who shows Julia a pistol her boyfriend Cristian gave her for protection. Later that night, Julia waves at the man in the window as a test, and he waves back. Suspecting it's the same man who followed her, she calls the police. Francis accompanies an officer to the building opposite to speak with the man but later tells Julia that she is overreacting.

Soon after, Julia spots the man on the street and follows him to a strip club, where he works as a janitor. Irina, working as a dancer at the club, spots her. Julia questions Irina about the man, but she knows nothing. At home, Julia has a vivid dream about being attacked and strangled, and awakens to hear a scream and something breaking from Irina's apartment. She convinces the landlady to unlock the door to Irina's apartment, but they find no sign of Irina.

The next day, Cristian arrives searching for Irina. He and Julia try to confront the janitor at his apartment, but no one answers the door. After Cristian leaves, Julia works up the nerve to knock on the door herself, but it is answered by an elderly man. As she gets in the elevator to leave, she sees the janitor. That night, a police officer arrives at her apartment accompanied by the man, identified as Daniel Weber, who accuses Julia of stalking him. The officer calls the incident a misunderstanding and Daniel shakes Julia's hand. Francis later shows Julia a news report stating that the Spider has been apprehended.

Julia accompanies Francis to a company party and gleans that he has made jokes about her fears to his coworkers. She angrily leaves and boards the subway, where she notices Daniel in the near-empty car. When he attempts to explain why he watches her, that he lives an isolated, unexciting life caring for his father, Julia notices what appears to be the outline of a severed head in his shopping bag. She returns home and begins packing but is interrupted by music playing in Irina's apartment. Inside, she finds Irina's headless corpse before Daniel smothers her with a plastic bag.

When Julia regains consciousness, Daniel recounts how he killed Irina and hid with her body when Julia and the landlady entered the apartment. Julia hears Francis enter their apartment next door, but when she attempts to scream, Daniel slashes her throat. Francis calls Julia's cell phone, which he hears ringing inside Irina's apartment. He sees Daniel exiting and begins to walk toward him, but Julia, having feigned dying, suddenly kills Daniel with Irina's pistol. She steps out of Irina's apartment, covered in blood, and stares at Francis.

== Cast ==
- Maika Monroe as Julia
- Karl Glusman as Francis
- Burn Gorman as Daniel Weber
- Tudor Petruț as taxi driver
- Mădălina Anea as Irina
- Cristina Deleanu as Eleanora
- Daniel Nuță as Cristian
- Florian Ghimpu as Officer Radu
- Gabriela Butuc as Flavia
- Bogdan-Alexandru Ciubuciu as Young Man

== Production ==
In March 2021, it was announced that Maika Monroe, Karl Glusman and Burn Gorman would star in a film titled Watcher for Image Nation Abu Dhabi and Spooky Pictures.

Principal photography began on March 8, 2021, and concluded on April 16, 2021, in Bucharest, Romania. The film took approximately six weeks to make.

== Release ==
It premiered in the Sundance Film Festival on January 21, 2022, where it was nominated for the Grand Jury Prize. Afterwards, IFC Midnight and Shudder acquired the North American distribution rights to the film, while AGC International sold worldwide rights outside North America to Focus Features. It was theatrically released in the United States on June 3, 2022, and on-demand on June 21, 2022, by IFC Films. The film was released on Blu-ray in North America on October 4, 2022.

== Themes ==
Okuno and Monroe discussed how it is "a story about the importance of believing women when they think they are in danger." Okuno said,

A lot of my work writing on the script was about pulling in from my own experience about what it's like to be a woman in the world, what it's like to be confronted with people who are doubting you and just knowing that as women, unfortunately, we already know that we're going to be doubted. We already have to sort of police our own emotions and approach things very delicately, and that in and of itself can be very frustrating. So I feel like that's the journey that you see Julia on in this movie. ... [In Maika's performance] I saw her self-regulating and I saw the sort of quiet frustration in having to do that constantly.

Maika Monroe agreed, saying she

connected with this story just immediately. It's obviously a thriller and it's a heightened story, but the character is so grounded, and the story that is being told is so grounded, and it's believable. Because this sort of stuff happens. I mean, I've dealt with it. Even within relationships that I've had, that a person that I consider to be maybe one of the closest people in my life, when that person doesn't have my back or doesn't believe me, I think it's the most lonely that I have ever felt. And that's something that Julia experiences — this person that is supposed to be there for her isn't.

Julia feels lonely and isolated. Okuno explained how the character evolved when she reshaped Zack Ford's script. Originally,

it was split between Julia and Francis' point of view. [...] There was an earnest effort to keep making Francis less of a [dick], honestly. ... [E]arly on, I feel like he does try to be proactive and he does try to listen to her. But for me, Francis' fundamental failing isn't even that he's an ass — or dismissive, it's that he cannot actually empathize with what she's going through because he hasn't really been there himself. He just fundamentally doesn't understand what it's like to be a woman and to have an experience of being followed and to have that experience supported by a lifetime's worth of little moments that add up to just generally feeling unsafe or always having to look around and always being aware, always having this omnipresent gaze on the back of your head.

Entertainment Weekly wrote, "This is why the film ends not with Daniel's death, but with the withering look Julia offers to Francis, who consistently insisted that she's overreacting."

== Reception ==
=== Box office ===
Upon its theatrical release in June 2022 Deadline reported that Watcher had recorded the biggest opening weekend grosses ever for IFC Films and its IFC Midnight/Shudder label. The film opened on 764 U.S. screens and was one of the distributor's widest ever releases.

"Watcher is one of the best feature debuts we have ever screened out of Sundance and with it, Chloe Okuno has proven without a doubt that she is a leading new voice in horror," said IFC Film president Arianna Bocco. "We are thrilled to have been her partner on the release of Watcher and remain committed to finding the best new voices working in film today.”

Watcher grossed $2 million in the United States and Canada, and $1.2 million in other territories, for a total worldwide of $3.2 million, against a production budget of $5 million.

In the United States and Canada, the film earned $826,775 from 764 theaters in its opening weekend. It made $335,376 (a drop of 59%) in its second weekend; $87,155 (–74%) in its third; $21,843 (–74.9%) in its fourth; and $7,386 (–66.2%) in its fifth.

=== Critical response ===
On the review aggregator website Rotten Tomatoes, 88% of 149 critics' reviews are positive, with an average rating of 6.9/10. The website's consensus reads: "Although its story may lack surprises, Watcher benefits from director Chloe Okuno's chilling grip on the material – and Maika Monroe's terrific work in the leading role." Metacritic, which uses a weighted average, assigned the film a score of 72 out of 100, based on 27 critics, indicating "generally favorable" reviews.

Lena Wilson of The New York Times calls it "one of this century's most arresting tales of female anxiety." Filmmaker Anna Bogutskaya, in Time Out, awards the film 4 out of 5 stars, saying, "Monroe is fantastic at making Julia's swelling paranoia both the source of empathy and distrust. [...] Okuno's direction and Monroe's performance, together, create a simmering anxiety that never really relents."

In a 4-out-of-5 stars review, Mike McCahill of The Guardian locates the suspense in the movie's realism, comparing it with that of Alfred Hitchcock's films in "the wife's mounting fears compounded by frustration at a Rational Spouse seeking to explain them away as girly misunderstanding. [...] Okuno describes this gaslighting for what it is, and that permits us the rare privilege of a mainstream thriller heroine who actually errs on the side of caution throughout. As in 2014's It Follows, Monroe is no pushover, and her reward for persistence, amid the nicely unpredictable finale, is a 'told you so' moment for the ages." Also in The Guardian, Wendy Ide provides another 4 out of 5 stars, writing similarly, "The horror genre is littered with the bodies of female characters whose gut instincts were ignored, whose legitimate concerns were dismissed as hysteria. [...] But this classy debut feature from American director Chloe Okuno crafts a teasing, uneasy sense of uncertainty, both about the character – is she a target? Or an aggressor? The stalked or the stalker? – and the Bucharest backdrop, with its gloomily imposing eastern bloc architecture and flaking layers of neglect."
