= Abigail (2024 film) =

Film by Matt Bettinelli-Olpin and Tyler Gillett

- Theatrical release poster
- Directed by: Matt Bettinelli-Olpin; Tyler Gillett
- Written by: Stephen Shields; Guy Busick
- Produced by: William Sherak; James Vanderbilt; Paul Neinstein; Tripp Vinson; Chad Villella
- Starring: Melissa Barrera; Dan Stevens; Kathryn Newton; Will Catlett; Kevin Durand; Angus Cloud; Alisha Weir; Giancarlo Esposito
- Cinematography: Aaron Morton
- Edited by: Michael P. Shawver
- Music by: Brian Tyler
- Production companies: Project X Entertainment; Vinson Films; Radio Silence Productions
- Distributed by: Universal Pictures
- Release dates: April 7, 2024 (Overlook Film Festival); April 19, 2024 (United States)
- Running time: 109 minutes
- Country: United States
- Language: English
- Budget: $28 million
- Box office: $43 million

Abigail is a 2024 American horror comedy film directed by Matt Bettinelli-Olpin and Tyler Gillett, written by Stephen Shields and Guy Busick, and starring Alisha Weir as the title character, Melissa Barrera, Dan Stevens, Kathryn Newton, Will Catlett, Kevin Durand, Angus Cloud (posthumously), and Giancarlo Esposito. The film follows a motley group of hired criminals who kidnap the ballerina daughter of a powerful underworld boss and are told to hold on her for a ransom while unaware that she is actually a vampire.

Originally an adaptation of Dracula's Daughter (1936), the film was announced to be in development in April 2023, with Bettinelli-Olpin and Gillett attached as directors, and Shields and Busick hired to write the screenplay. It was also announced that the film would be a co-production between Bettinelli-Olpin, Gillett, and Chad Villella's Radio Silence Productions, James Vanderbilt, Paul Neinstein, and William Sherak's Project X Entertainment, and Tripp Vinson's Vinson Films.

Abigail had its world premiere at the Overlook Film Festival on April 7, 2024, and was theatrically released in the United States by Universal Pictures on April 19. The film received generally positive reviews from critics and grossed $43 million on a $28 million production budget.

== Plot ==
Abigail, a young ballet dancer, is kidnapped by six highly-recommended skilled criminals and taken to the secluded Wilhelm Manor. Their employer Lambert instructs them to guard Abigail for 24 hours, at which point each of them will receive $7 million from a $50 million ransom paid by her father. The group, using aliases to protect their identities, consists of "Joey", "Frank", "Sammy", "Rickles", "Peter", and "Dean".

Joey is reluctant to continue with the plan (as she was unaware Abigail was a child and has a son herself). Nevertheless, she is tasked with managing Abigail. Joey promises the girl that she will protect her. Abigail says her father does not care about her and will not pay the ransom, then ominously apologizes for what is "going to happen" to Joey. Perturbed by this, Frank violently confronts her, learning that her father is Kristof Lazaar, a powerful—almost mythical—crime lord.

While looking for a snack, Dean is ambushed and decapitated. Just as the group surmises that Lazaar's legendary violent enforcer Valdez is inside the house, a security system suddenly prevents them from leaving. Rickles is then found torn to pieces. When the group confronts Abigail for information, she transforms into a vampire. Frank shoots her in the head, but she heals instantly. Frank, Sammy, and Peter gather various folkloric items said to harm vampires, but they are revealed to have no effect on Abigail, who easily overwhelms them with her superior speed and agility. Joey is able to tranquilize the girl and cage her, but not before she bites Sammy.

Upon awakening, the centuries-old Abigail admits that Lambert works for her father; the "kidnapping" is merely a trap to dispose of Lazaar's enemies while being familiar with the group's histories. Joey deduces that Abigail kills for her father in hopes of winning his love. Abigail breaks out of her confines and attacks Frank, but Joey exposes her to sunlight, which explodes her hand. With just hours before sunset, the group split up to find an escape route. Sammy turns into a vampire and kills Peter by drinking his blood, before attacking Frank and Joey, who blow her up after reflecting sunlight with a silver tray.

Lambert lures Joey and Frank into a hidden safe room, where he reveals Abigail turned him into a vampire two years earlier as punishment for helping Frank. Lambert turns Frank into a vampire, making a deal to cooperate to kill Abigail and Lazaar, and take control of their empire - but Frank instead kills Lambert before beating Abigail down and drinking her blood, leaving her weakened. Cornered, Joey leaves a voice message for her son, apologizing for having been absent from his life for many years. Drunk on his new power, Frank tells Joey that he will turn her next and intends to have her kill her son. His bite fails to work, however, as he is too "young" to create puppet vampires, and Abigail teams up with Joey to kill him.

Abigail encourages Joey to leave and be part of her son's life, but Lazaar (Note: Lazaar suggests he has had many different names over many centuries, implying Lazaar is a contemporary name for Count Dracula.) arrives and threatens her. Abigail defends Joey for being present when she needed her, while Lazaar was not. Although her father angrily rebukes her, he relents for Abigail's sake and allows the bloodied, battered Joey to leave.

== Cast ==
- Melissa Barrera as Joey / Anna Lucia Cruz, a former Army medic and recovering addict
- Dan Stevens as Frank / Adam Barrett, a corrupt former New York City Police Department detective
- Alisha Weir as Abigail, a centuries-old vampire with the appearance of a 12-year-old girl
- Will Catlett as Rickles, a Marine sniper who lives by his own moral code
- Kathryn Newton as Sammy / Jessica Hurney, a thrill-seeking hacker from a wealthy upbringing
- Kevin Durand as Peter / Terrence Lacroix, a physically-imposing former mob enforcer of the Montreal Broussard family struggling with his conscience
- Angus Cloud as Dean, a talented and sociopathic getaway driver
- Giancarlo Esposito as Lambert, a criminal mastermind connected to Abigail's kidnapping
- Matthew Goode as Father / Kristof Lazaar, an ancient vampire, infamous crime lord, and Abigail's father

== Production ==
=== Development ===
In April 2023, it was reported that Radio Silence Productions was developing a monster thriller film for Universal Pictures, with Matt Bettinelli-Olpin and Tyler Gillett attached to direct, with Chad Villella serving as producer alongside William Sherak, Paul Neinstein and James Vanderbilt at Project X Entertainment, while Stephen Shields and Guy Busick would write the screenplay. The project was stated to be a modern-day adaptation of one of the Universal Classic Monsters characters similar in approach to The Invisible Man (2020) or Renfield (2023), with the synopsis being described as "a unique take on legendary monster lore and will represent a fresh, new direction for how to celebrate classic characters". Originally intended to be Bettinelli-Olpin and Gillett's next project following the release of the fifth Scream installment, the duo delayed its realization until after Scream VI.

The project was originally titled Dracula's Daughter, the same name as the 1936 film upon which it is based; with Universal restating that while they had considered a singular continuity with The Mummy (2017), each release will continue to be "rooted in the horror genre, with no restrictions on budget, rating or genre. They are not part of a shared interconnected universe, which allows each film to stand on its own. This new direction is filmmaker-driven, inviting innovative filmmakers with original, bold ideas for these characters to develop the stories and pitch them." The film was officially titled Abigail in January 2024. As an easter egg to previous Radio Silence films, a portrait of a distant ancestor of Ready or Not character Tony Le Domas is displayed in the mansion.

Bettinelli-Olpin and Gillett said they wanted to avoid mentioning Dracula as a way to set apart their work from other vampire movies. At one point, they considered having Abigail's father reveal he killed Dracula, but this line did not make it into the film.

=== Casting ===
In April 2023, Melissa Barrera was cast for one of the main roles of the film after previously appearing in the filmmaking duo's Scream films. The following month, Dan Stevens, Kevin Durand, Alisha Weir, Kathryn Newton, Angus Cloud, and Will Catlett joined the cast. In June 2023, it was announced that Giancarlo Esposito was cast in a supporting role. Weir, known for her role as Matilda Wormwood in the 2022 Netflix musical film, was said to be playing Dracula's daughter, although this connection is never made in the film.

=== Filming ===
Principal photography began May 15, 2023 in Dublin, Ireland, with the setting intending to stand in for Boston, though the city location is not made specific in the final film. The opening dance performance was filmed at Bord Gáis Energy Theatre in Dublin. Most of the filming took place at Glenmaroon House (aka The Guinness Manor), which is the ancestral home of the prominent Guinness Family, on the edge of Dublin's Phoenix Park. Filming was suspended July 14 due to the 2023 SAG-AFTRA strike. After the strike ended, filming resumed November 23 and wrapped December 14. Aaron Morton served as the cinematographer. Cloud finished filming his scenes prior to his death on July 31, 2023. Weir learned ballet for her role, incorporating it into her character's movements, and performed her own stunts. Filming wrapped on December 14 of the same year.

== Music ==
Brian Tyler composed the film's score; he collaborated with Bettinelli-Olpin and Gillett on prior projects. The directors commissioned Jean Dawson for an original song, "Burn My Tongue", which plays over the closing credits. The soundtrack album, featuring Tyler's score and "Burn My Tongue", was released on April 19.

=== Soundtrack ===
No.	Title	Writer(s)	Producer(s)	Length
1.	"Tchaikovsky: I. Scene – Swan Theme (Swan Lake Suite) OP.20a" (performed by Berliner Philharmoniker)	Pytor Tchaikovsky	Cord Garben	3:03
2.	"Glamorous Lifestyle" (performed by The Jacka feat. Andre Nickatina)	Andre Adams, Sultan Banks, Dominick Newton	Traxamillion	3:57
3.	"Goodbye, Good Luck, God Bless You" (performed by Buck Owens and the Buckaroos)	Buck Owens	Ken Nelson	2:16
4.	"Anyhow, I Love You" (performed by Guy Clark feat. Waylon Jennings & Emmylou Harris)	Guy Clark	Neil Wilburn	3:55
5.	"Smokestack Lightnin’" (performed by Howlin’ Wolf)	Chester Burnett	Leonard Chess, Phil Chess & Willie Dixon	3:08
6.	"Blood and Tears" (performed by Danzig)	Glenn Danzig	Rick Rubin	4:20
7.	"Burn My Tongue" (performed by Jean Dawson)	Jean Dawson	Jean Dawson, Hoskins, Biako, & Johnny May	3:07
Total length:				23:36

== Release ==
Abigail had its world premiere at the Overlook Film Festival on April 7, 2024, and was released by Universal Pictures in the United States on April 19, 2024. The film was released on premium video on demand by Universal Pictures Home Entertainment on May 7, 2024. The film was released on DVD and Blu-ray on July 9, 2024. The release includes four making-of documentaries, a feature-length audio commentary with Matt Bettinelli-Olpin, Tyler Gillett and editor Michael Shawver as well as deleted scenes and a gag reel.

== Reception ==
=== Box office ===
Abigail grossed $25.9 million in the United States and Canada and $17.1 million in other territories, for a worldwide total of $43 million.

In the United States and Canada, Abigail was released alongside The Ministry of Ungentlemanly Warfare and Spy × Family Code: White, and was projected to gross $12–15 million from 3,384 theaters in its opening weekend. The film made $4 million on its first day, including $1 million from Thursday night previews. It went on to debut to $10.2 million, finishing second at the box office behind holdover Civil War. The film then made $5.2 million (a drop of 49.5%) and $2.3 million in its second and third weekends, respectively, finishing in fifth, and then ninth.

=== Critical response ===
On the review aggregator website Rotten Tomatoes, 83% of 226 critics' reviews are positive, with an average rating of 6.8/10. The website's consensus reads: "Carrying off well-worn vampire tropes with a balletic flourish, Abigail dances around the familiarity of its premise with a game cast and slick style." Metacritic, which uses a weighted average, assigned the film a score of 62 out of 100, based on 38 critics, indicating "generally favorable" reviews. Audiences polled by CinemaScore gave the film an average grade of "B" on an A+ to F scale.

BJ Colangelo wrote in SlashFilm that "With a pitch-perfect ensemble cast, exquisitely timed laugh-out-loud moments of humor, a barrage of twists (or should I say pirouettes?), an unbelievable amount of blood, killer action set pieces, and a downright transcendent performance by one of the best child actors in the game — Abigail sets the bar as the most fun you can have with a horror movie of the year. In other words, Abigail is horror on pointe... Traditionally, films that are this delightfully raucous, bloody (and I mean BLOODY), and silly are relegated to B-movie schlock (not a bad thing, for the record), but Abigail still embraces the excessive and ornate gothic aesthetics of classic horror movies. The result is an old-school vampire movie with modern frisk and flair and an absolute blast of a movie to watch with a crowd. I'm sure there will be plenty who think I'm overhyping the film or exaggerating how good it is, but I honestly wouldn't change a thing. Abigail is a perfect horror movie and already one of the best films of 2024. I pinky promise."

Manohla Dargis wrote in The New York Times that "Abigail has been described as a take on Dracula's Daughter (1936), one of the horror films in Universal's vault, some of which it has resurrected in some fashion. The press notes for Abigail name-check a few vampire titles, but Daughter isn't among them, and for good reason because there's little to link these two. That's too bad; the earlier film is a true curiosity. It stars Gloria Holden as a countess who preys on men and women alike, and begs a doctor to help her with her 'ghastly' condition. With its lesbian overtones, the movie is a vexed and tasty text — censors urged the studio to avoid suggestions of 'perverse sexual desire' — and the countess a complex villain in a film that is very much worth a look".

David Fear of Rolling Stone wrote, "It's a gas, watching this ensemble bouncing off each other when the shit goes down and navigating the obstacle course that Bettinelli-Olpin and Gillett have set for them in the film's chaotic, mondo bloody back half. (We weren't joking about that whole exploding body thing.) Stevens has previously shown a knack for playing complicated douchebags, and that talent becomes refined here. Weir, who's a bit of a find in terms of playing a centuries-old fiend in the body of a tween, puts a sickly, sharp spin on a lot of her juicier lines. Cloud (R.I.P.) and Durand finds different ways of showcasing the dim-wittery of their characters, Newton once again reminds you that she's a first-rate pickpocket when it comes to stealing scenes, and Barrera steps into the role as steely scream queen extraordinaire in a way that makes you hope she really does have a long career in front of her instead of an aborted one already behind her."

The film has been included on many best of 2024 lists including Variety's "The Best Horror Movies of 2024", Screen Rant's "10 Best Horror Movies Of 2024", Bloody Disgusting's "The 10 Best Horror Movies Released in the First Half of 2024", Time Out's "The Best Horror Movies of 2024" and SlashFilm's "The 19 Best Horror Movies Of 2024 So Far".

On July 8, 2024, the film was nominated for five Fangoria Chainsaw Awards including three for Best Supporting Performance, Best MakeUp FX and Best Wide Release Movie.

=== Home media ===
After marketing for the film was commonly blamed for its lackluster box-office leading to headlines such as "'Abigail's Marketing Team Made a Huge Mistake," the film "finally found success" on home media platforms as "one of the most popular titles online" and was number one on Peacock when it was released where it "has become a hit on streaming."

=== Accolades ===
Award	Date of ceremony	Category	Recipient(s)	Result	Ref.
Astra Midseason Movie Awards	July 3, 2024	Best Horror Movie	Abigail	Nominated	
Fangoria Chainsaw Awards	October 2024	Best Wide Release	Abigail	Nominated	
Fangoria Chainsaw Awards	October 2024	Best Supporting Performance	Kathryn Newton	Nominated	
Fangoria Chainsaw Awards	October 2024	Best Supporting Performance	Dan Stevens	Nominated	
Fangoria Chainsaw Awards	October 2024	Best Supporting Performance	Alisha Weir	Nominated	
Fangoria Chainsaw Awards	October 2024	Best Makeup FX	Liz Byrne, Paul Byrne, and Matthew Smith	Nominated	
Saturn Awards	February 2, 2025	Best Horror Movie	Abigail	Nominated	
Saturn Awards	February 2, 2025	Best Younger Performer in a Film	Alisha Weir	Nominated	
Critics' Choice Movie Awards	February 7, 2025	Best Young Performer	Alisha Weir	Nominated	
IFTA Film & Drama Awards	February 14, 2025	Best Script	Stephen Shields	Nominated	
IFTA Film & Drama Awards	February 14, 2025	Best Lead Actress	Alisha Weir	Nominated	
IFTA Film & Drama Awards	February 14, 2025	Best Costume Design	Gwen Jeffares Hourie	Nominated	
IFTA Film & Drama Awards	February 14, 2025	Best Production Design	Susie Cullen	Won	
IFTA Film & Drama Awards	February 14, 2025	Best Sound	Hugh Fox	Nominated	
IFTA Film & Drama Awards	February 14, 2025	Best Hair & Makeup	Linda Gannon & Liz Byrne	Nominated	
