= White Elephant (upcoming film) =

- Directed by: Eli Craig
- Written by: JT Billings; Eli Craig
- Produced by: Spencer Berman; Nick Jonas; William Sherak; Paul Neinstein; James Vanderbilt; Tyler Gillett; Matt Bettinelli-Olpin
- Starring: Nick Jonas; Kathryn Newton; KJ Apa; Madeleine Arthur; Josh Brener; Ashley Park; Alexandra Shipp; Justice Smith
- Production companies: MRC; Radio Silence Productions; Project X Entertainment; Powered By Jonas
- Distributed by: Black Bear Pictures
- Country: United States
- Language: English

White Elephant is an upcoming American Christmas horror film directed and co-written by Eli Craig. It stars Nick Jonas, Kathryn Newton, KJ Apa, Madeleine Arthur, Josh Brener, Ashley Park, Alexandra Shipp, and Justice Smith.

== Cast ==
- Nick Jonas
- Kathryn Newton
- KJ Apa
- Madeleine Arthur
- Josh Brener
- Ashley Park
- Alexandra Shipp
- Justice Smith

== Production ==
In April 2026, it was reported that Eli Craig would be co-writing and directing a horror film starring Nick Jonas, Kathryn Newton, KJ Apa, Madeleine Arthur, Josh Brener, Ashley Park, Alexandra Shipp, and Justice Smith. In May, Black Bear Pictures acquired the international sales rights. Jonas, Tyler Gillett, and Matt Bettinelli-Olpin serve as producers.

Principal photography began on March 30, 2026, in Vancouver.
