= Kathryn Newton =

American actress (born 1997)

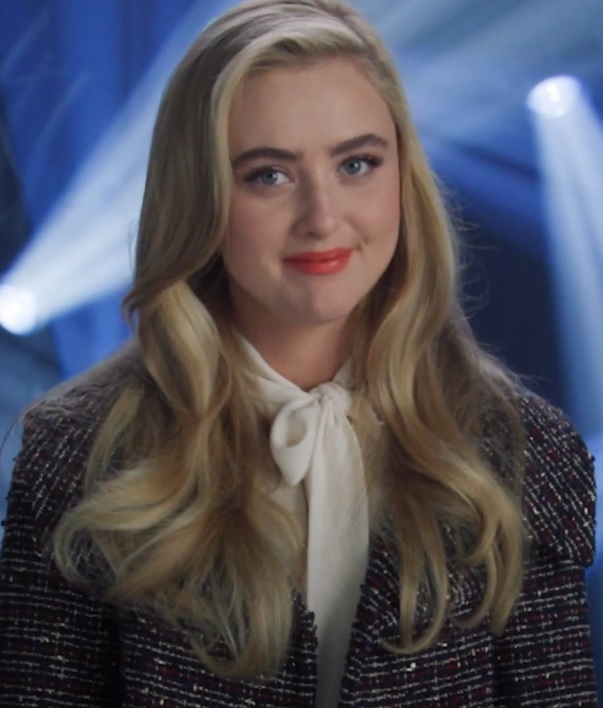
- Newton in 2023
- Born: Kathryn Love Newton; February 8, 1997 (age 29); Orlando, Florida, U.S.
- Occupation: Actress
- Years active: 2001–present

Kathryn Love Newton (born February 8, 1997) is an American actress. She is known for her starring roles as Louise Brooks in the CBS comedy series Gary Unmarried (2008–2010), Abigail Carlson in the HBO mystery drama series Big Little Lies (2017–2019), and Allie Pressman in the Netflix teen drama series The Society (2019). She is also known for portraying the older versions of Claire Novak in the CW dark fantasy series Supernatural (2014–2018) and Joanie Clark in the AMC period drama series Halt and Catch Fire (2016–2017).

Newton has appeared in various films, including Bad Teacher (2011), Three Billboards Outside Ebbing, Missouri (2017), Blockers (2018), Pokémon Detective Pikachu (2019), The Map of Tiny Perfect Things (2021), Ant-Man and the Wasp: Quantumania (2023), and The Devil's Mouth (2026).

For her roles in the horror films Paranormal Activity 4 (2012), for which she received the Young Artist Award for Best Leading Young Actress in a Feature Film, Freaky (2020), Lisa Frankenstein and Abigail (both 2024), and Ready or Not 2: Here I Come (2026), Newton has been dubbed as a scream queen.

== Early life and education ==
Newton was born on February 8, 1997, in Orlando, Florida, the only child of Robin and David Newton. She began playing golf tournaments at age eight.

Newton graduated from Notre Dame High School in 2015. She was a member of the Notre Dame High School girls golf team; she helped the school's golf team to win three league championships. She routinely shot in the 70s, and her lowest 18-hole score in a tournament was a 69.

She postponed college at University of Southern California (USC) to pursue her acting career. She considered trying out as a "walk-on" member of the women's golf team at USC.

== Career ==
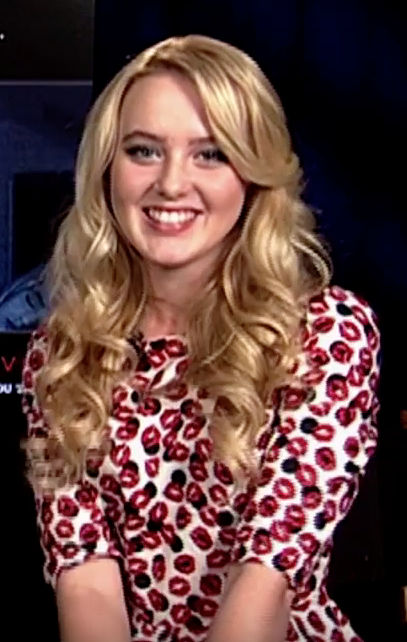
Newton in a 2012 interview for the film Paranormal Activity 4

Newton started her career at age four, making her television debut on the soap opera All My Children, playing Colby Marian Chandler from 2001 to 2004. Meanwhile, she also starred in two short films, Abbie Down East (2002) and Bun-Bun (2003). In 2008, Newton was cast in the role of Louise Brooks in the CBS television series Gary Unmarried. When she was twelve, her family moved to Los Angeles, where she attended the Notre Dame High School.

In 2010, Newton won two Young Artist Awards for "Best Performance in a TV Comedy Series" and "Best Performance in a TV series (Comedy or Drama)" for Gary Unmarried. Newton played the role of Chase Rubin-Rossi in the 2011 film Bad Teacher. She had the lead role, Alex, in the 2012 film Paranormal Activity 4, the fourth in the franchise, and won an award at the 34th Young Artist Awards for her performance in the film. Beginning in season 10, she had a recurring role as Claire Novak on Supernatural.

In 2017, Newton appeared in the HBO series Big Little Lies based on the Liane Moriarty novel of the same name. She also had major roles in the films Three Billboards Outside Ebbing, Missouri as Angela Hayes and Ben Is Back as Ivy Burns.

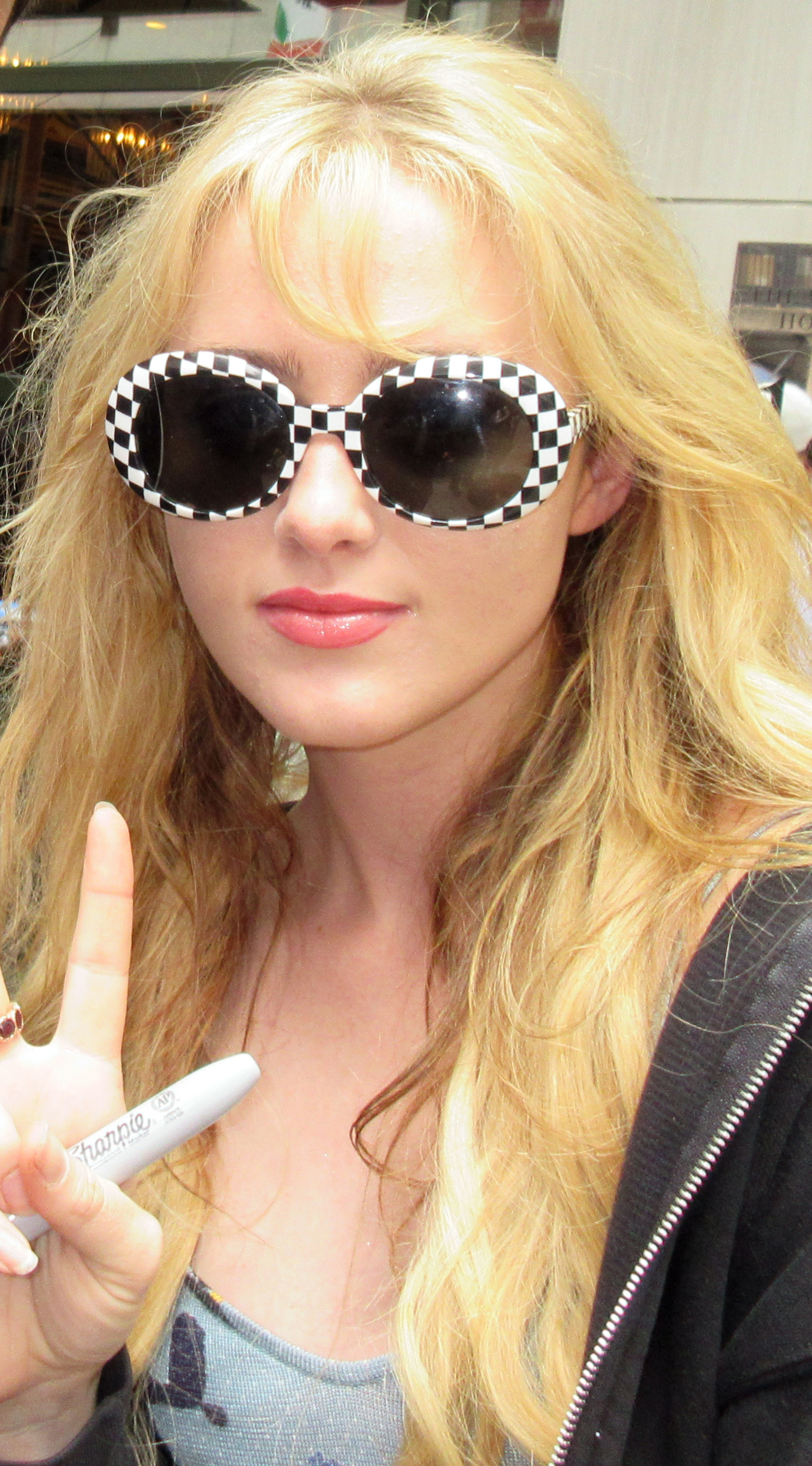
Newton in 2019

Newton plays Lucy in Pokémon Detective Pikachu, a 2019 live action film based on the video game of the same name. She also played the lead role of Allie in the Netflix mystery drama series The Society, which premiered on May 10, 2019. In 2020, she starred in the well-reviewed horror comedy film Freaky, directed by Christopher Landon, as a teenage girl who switches bodies with a serial killer. In 2021, she appeared in The Map of Tiny Perfect Things, directed by Ian Samuels. She portrays Cassie Lang in the Marvel Cinematic Universe film Ant-Man and the Wasp: Quantumania, replacing Emma Fuhrmann who played the character in Avengers: Endgame.

In 2024, Newton starred as Brittany Winner in Winner, a black-comedy about Reality Winner that premiered at the Sundance Film Festival on January 20. Newton played Lisa Swallows in the comedy-horror Lisa Frankenstein, a 1980s-teen-film retelling of Frankenstein; it was directed by Zelda Williams for her debut film and released on February 9. She played Sammy in Abigail, a vampire driven horror film which premiered at the Overlook Film Festival on April 7. Newton played the supporting role of Chloe in Griffin in Summer, an independent film which premiered at the Tribeca film festival on June 6, 2024.

In June 2026, it was announced Newton would star opposite Cooper Hoffman in Hulu's new drama pilot, Durango.

== Filmography ==
=== Film ===
Year	Title	Role	Notes	Ref.
2002	Abbie Down East	Mahala Burgess	Short	
2003	Bun-Bun	Chloe	Short	
2011	Bad Teacher	Chase Rubin-Rossi		
2012	Paranormal Activity 4	Alexandra "Alex" Nelson		
2015	The Martial Arts Kid	Rina		
2016	Mono	Katie		
2017	Lady Bird	Darlene Bell		
2017	Three Billboards Outside Ebbing, Missouri	Angela Hayes		
2018	Blockers	Julie Decker		
2018	Ben Is Back	Ivy Burns		
2019	Pokémon Detective Pikachu	Lucy Stevens		
2020	Freaky	Millie Kessler / the Blissfield Butcher		
2021	The Map of Tiny Perfect Things	Margaret		
2021	Unknown Dimension: The Story of Paranormal Activity	Herself	Documentary film	
2023	Ant-Man and the Wasp: Quantumania	Cassandra "Cassie" Lang		
2024	Winner	Brittany Winner		
2024	Lisa Frankenstein	Lisa Swallows		
2024	Abigail	Sammy / Jessica Hurney		
2024	Griffin in Summer	Chloe		
2026	Ready or Not 2: Here I Come	Faith MacCaullay		
2026	DreamQuil	Margo Case		
2026	The Devil's Mouth	Sara McKenna		
2026	Avengers: Doomsday †	Cassandra "Cassie" Lang	Post-production	
TBA	Samo Lives †		Post-production	
TBA	White Elephant †		Post-production; also executive producer	
TBA	Hot Year †		Post-production	
TBA	Old Friends New Friends †		Filming	[42]

=== Television ===
Year	Title	Role	Notes	Ref.
2002–2003	All My Children	Colby Marian Chandler	2 episodes	
2008–2010	Gary Unmarried	Louise Brooks	Main role	
2013	Mad Men	Mandy	Episode: "The Quality of Mercy"	
2013–2014	Dog with a Blog	Emily Adams	3 episodes	
2014–2018	Supernatural	Claire Novak	Recurring role, 6 episodes	
2016	A Housekeeper's Revenge	Laura Blackwell	Television film	
2016–2017	Halt and Catch Fire	Joanie Clark	Recurring role (seasons 3–4), 10 episodes	
2017	Little Women	Amy March	Miniseries	
2017–2019	Big Little Lies	Abigail Carlson	Main role	
2019	The Society	Allie Pressman	Main role	
2023	Marvel Studios: Assembled	Herself	Episode: "The Making of Ant-Man and the Wasp: Quantumania"	
2024	Hacks	Bella Donaldson	Episode: "Bulletproof"	
2025	Doctor Odyssey	Hannah	Episode: "Spring Break"	

=== Music video ===
- "Goodbyes" (2019) by Post Malone (feat. Young Thug), as Woman

== Awards and nominations ==
Year	Award	Category	Work	Result	Ref.
2009	30th Young Artist Awards	Best Performance in a TV Series (Comedy or Drama) – Supporting Young Actress	Gary Unmarried	Nominated	
2010	31st Young Artist Awards	Best Performance in a TV Series (Comedy or Drama) – Supporting Young Actress	Gary Unmarried	Won	
2011	32nd Young Artist Awards	Best Performance in a TV Series (Comedy or Drama) – Supporting Young Actress	Gary Unmarried	Nominated	
2013	34th Young Artist Awards	Best Performance in a Feature Film – Leading Young Actress	Paranormal Activity 4	Won	
2020	26th Screen Actors Guild Awards	Outstanding Performance by an Ensemble in a Drama Series	Big Little Lies	Nominated	
2020	1st Critics Choice Super Awards	Best Actress in a Horror Movie	Freaky	Nominated	
2020	1st Critics Choice Super Awards	Best Villain in a Movie	Freaky	Nominated	
2024	Fangoria Chainsaw Awards	Best Lead Performance	Lisa Frankenstein	Nominated	
2024	Fangoria Chainsaw Awards	Best Supporting Performance	Abigail	Nominated	
