= Devil's Due (film) =

2014 film by Matt Bettinelli-Olpin and Tyler Gillett

- Theatrical release poster
- Directed by: Matt Bettinelli-Olpin; Tyler Gillett
- Written by: Lindsay Devlin
- Produced by: John Davis
- Starring: Allison Miller; Zach Gilford
- Cinematography: Justin Martinez
- Edited by: Rod Dean
- Production companies: Davis Entertainment; Radio Silence Productions
- Distributed by: 20th Century Fox
- Release date: January 17, 2014
- Running time: 89 minutes
- Country: United States
- Language: English
- Budget: $7 million
- Box office: $36.9 million

Devil's Due is a 2014 American psychological supernatural horror film directed by Matt Bettinelli-Olpin and Tyler Gillett in their full-length feature directorial debut, and written by Lindsay Devlin. The film stars Allison Miller, Zach Gilford, and Sam Anderson. The film was released on January 17, 2014.

== Plot ==
Zach McCall and his fiancé, Sam, decide to begin a video diary the night before their wedding so that their future child will have a record of their family history. After their wedding, they travel to the Dominican Republic for their honeymoon. After attending Carnival, they stop to speak to a palm reader who tells Sam she was "born from death" and that "they have been waiting for her." Sam and Zach become frightened and leave.

They find themselves lost on an unfamiliar street and unable to return to their hotel. They eventually find a taxi driver, who offers to take them to a nightclub. They reluctantly accept his offer and, after taking various shots in the club, fall unconscious. Sam is seemingly brought to an underground chamber, where she is subjected to a satanic ritual and engulfed by an unseen force.

Zach and Sam awaken in their hotel the following day, unaware of the previous night. A couple of weeks after the honeymoon, Sam discovers she is pregnant despite claiming to have taken birth control pills "religiously" ever since the wedding. Though shocked, Zach and Samantha are overjoyed and share the news with their family and friends.

The couple later attends their first ultrasound scan, during which the doctor says that the baby looks healthy and that Sam is due by the end of March. At that moment, the ultrasound screen goes static but recovers after a moment.

Throughout her pregnancy, Sam begins to experience a series of abnormal symptoms: nosebleeds, stomach bruising, cravings for raw meat (despite being a vegetarian), superhuman strength, telekinetic abilities, and violent acts of rage whenever she or the baby appears to be threatened. Also, Zach and Sam keep seeing strange people watching their house from afar. Sam becomes convinced that something is seriously wrong with the baby and that they are being watched.

After a second visit to the doctor, a new doctor appears and performs an amniocentesis after Sam appears nauseous. He has no answer as to the whereabouts of their original doctor. Zach reveals Sam's parents were killed in a car accident when she was in utero, and she was removed via caesarean. Before the couple returns home, masked men set up hidden cameras to monitor her progress and make sure she does not hurt the baby.

When Sam is 8 months pregnant, the couple attends Holy Communion at their church. Their usually friendly niece is oddly scared of Sam, and the priest who officiated Zach and Sam's wedding looks at Sam during the service and violently coughs up blood.

Later, at home, Zach reviews the communion footage he filmed and sees the mysterious cab driver sitting in a pew. He also reviews the footage from their night at the club and notices strange symbols on the doors. He visits the priest in the hospital, who explains that the symbol is related to summoning the Antichrist.

Separate footage reveals three friends walking in the woods, where they find slaughtered deer. They suddenly discover Sam eating a deer's intestines. When they try to speak to her, Sam kills them telekinetically.

Zach investigates the symbol further and asks his sister, Suzie, to stay with Sam. He breaks into an apparently abandoned house at the end of his street, where he finds the CCTV footage of his house and the missing ultrasound. He is almost caught by the house's inhabitants, who appear to be performing a ritual. Zach barely manages to escape.

When he does, he sees their second doctor, the man who was watching their house, the cult leader, and the cab driver who picked him up among the worshipers performing the ritual.

Upon returning home, Zach finds the house surrounded by the masked men who have been watching them all along. Inside, he finds Suzie dead and hears Sam scream as the house is being destroyed by the beast within Sam, fighting to get out.

He finds Sam in the baby's nursery, standing in a trance-like state with a knife to her stomach. Zach screams for her to stop, but she presses the knife to her stomach anyway, and there is a violent blast of light.

When Zach recovers, he finds Sam lying in her blood with her stomach cut. She cries and wonders if the baby is all right before dying. Zach grieves before the cab driver and the second doctor appear.

Zach begs the intruders to leave them alone, but the doctor takes the baby. He is then arrested and interrogated by the police on the death of his wife and sister and the disappearance of his child.

The ending shows another young couple on their honeymoon in Paris, where the same cab driver offers a lift, implying that the cycle will start again.

== Cast ==
- Allison Miller as Samantha McCall
- Zach Gilford as Zach McCall
- Sam Anderson as Father Thomas
- Madison Wolfe as Brittany
- Aimee Carrero as Emily
- Vanessa Ray as Suzie
- Michael Papajohn as Police Officer
- Griff Furst as Keith
- Robert Belushi as Mason
- Donna Duplantier as Dr. Ludka

== Production ==
On December 18, 2012, Fox announced that Matt Bettinelli-Olpin and Tyler Gillett would be directing Devil's Due, based upon a script written by Lindsay Devlin. Fox had approached the two directors (who are part of the filmmaking collective Radio Silence) based upon their short 10/31/98 in the 2012 horror anthology V/H/S.

Bettinelli-Olpin and Gillett had been approached by several other companies for "haunted house projects" but chose to work on Devil's Due over the other projects because they felt that the script was a character based "creepy mood piece" that focused on the deteriorating relationship between its two main characters. In an interview, the directors said they "focused on Zach & Samantha's love story from day one and the horror of watching the person you love degenerate, and being left helpless beyond continuing to love them unconditionally."

The script had been pitched to them as "a found-footage take on Rosemary's Baby," but the directors wanted to find ways to make their movie different from the 1968 film that they both praise and consider a personal favorite. This included instilling "a fun energy throughout" and "a sense of humor into the script."

Along with Allison Miller, Zach Gilford was announced to be in the film, which was shot during April 2013 in the Dominican Republic, New Orleans and Paris.

Bettinelli-Olpin and Gillett chose to shoot the film primarily with a Sony PMW-EX3, which they chose so that the film's actors could carry it throughout the film. The Canon 5D, Canon Vixia HF G10 and an iPhone 5 were also used in the production.

== Promotion ==
Fox released its first trailer for the film on October 16, 2013, and a second trailer on December 5, 2013. Whereas the initial marketing campaign focused the intimate thriller aspects of the McCalls' love story, later marketing concentrated specifically on the larger horror facets of the film.

On January 14, prior to the release of the film, Fox promoted the movie by releasing a video of footage of an animatronic baby carriage and demon baby scaring passers-by in New York City. The video went viral shortly thereafter and has had over 20 million views as of January 17, 2014.

A collector's edition of the Blu-ray with cover art by Orlando Arocena was released in 2017 alongside 19 MGM and Fox horror films such as Carrie, Joy Ride and Black Swan.

== Reception ==
Critical reception of Devil's Due was negative. On Rotten Tomatoes the film holds a rating of 21% based on 57 reviews, with an average rating of 4/10. The film's consensus reads: "Derivative and mostly uninspired, Devil's Due adds little to either the found-footage or horror genres that it's content to mimic." On Metacritic, the film has a score of 34 out of 100, based on 18 critics, indicating "generally unfavorable" reviews. Audiences polled by CinemaScore gave the film an average grade of "D+" on an A+ to F scale.

Much of the film's criticism centered upon the film's similarity to other films such as Rosemary's Baby and Paranormal Activity, an element that Fearnet reviewer Scott Weinberg remarked was likely more due to decisions by the film's production company than anything else. Weinberg called the movie "a darkly passionate homage to Rosemary's Baby, the similarities are both intentional and affectionate," and Bloody Disgusting gave the film a favorable review, praising the acting of its lead characters, the sense of humor and drawing positive comparisons to the directors' earlier work on V/H/S.

Since its initial release, however, the film has found a cult following and director Eli Roth has been vocal in his support of the film and in a series of posts on his official Twitter account, wrote "Don't pre-judge Devil's Due because Rosemary's Baby is a 'holy grail' movie. It's so smart, creative, inventive, and fun. Very very scary. The guys at Radio Silence killed it. Devil's Due is a legit scary, smart, horror film. So many awesome scenes. I loved it."

=== Home media ===
The film was released by 20th Century Fox Home Entertainment on Blu-ray and DVD on April 29, 2014.

== Use of found footage ==
Common criticism is aimed at the film's use of the found footage technique and asks the question "who assembled this footage?". The film's directors claimed that this was a deliberate choice, stating that "Audiences are way too smart to have the 'this is real' found footage wool pulled over their eyes anymore" and that, much like Chronicle, "Devil's Due doesn't pretend to be footage that anyone has found or compiled, it's simply a story told through cameras that exists in that world. In that sense, it's a bit of an experiment that we were able to have fun with and as the character's [sic] lives spiral out of control, we're able to mirror that journey visually by shifting to different POVs. The movie begins very bright, very intimate and full of movement, but as the watchers close in our couple we shifted to a lot more of the static cameras that exist in the world, like the security cameras, with much wider frames. We hoped to use that distance and coldness to mirror the despair and hopelessness that was tearing the couple apart." The film intentionally breaks many found footage conventions throughout, including the deliberate absence of a framing device (such as "these tapes were found by the police"), the use of an animated opening quote, a recognizable cast, a non-chronological narrative structure, and a music cue becoming the end-credits song.

== Soundtrack ==
The film contains diegetic music from Elvis Presley, The Gaslight Anthem, Alkaline Trio, Brenton Wood, Berlin, General Public, and Laura Stevenson.

No.	Title	Writer(s)	Performer	Length
1.	"Once Upon a Time"	Robert Bradley	The Gaslight Anthem
2.	"I Belong to You"	Leon Silver	Mallory Sands
3.	"Bridal Chorus"	Richard Wilhelm Wagner
4.	"Love Me Tender"	Elvis Presley and Vera Matson	Jordan Rippe
5.	"No More Words"	John Crawford	Berlin
6.	"As You Were"	Daniel Andriano, Matt Skiba, Glenn Porter	Alkaline Trio
7.	"Tenderness"	Micky Billingham, Roger Charlery, Dave Wakeling	General Public
8.	"Be Mine"	Herb Alpert and Frank D'Amico	The McCall Twins
9.	"Quieren Brilla"	Manuel Ariel Ciprian	El Aria
10.	"The Oogum Boogum Song"	Alfred Smith	Brenton Wood
11.	"Devil's Alibaba"	Adolfo Guerrero and Aliosha Michelen	Edgar Molina
12.	"Devil's Batucada"	Adolfo Guerrero and Aliosha Michelen	Edgar Molina
13.	"Nadie Pone Pero"	Adolfo Guerrero and Aliosha Michelen	Adelobo
14.	"Melma"	Wilson Padilla Almonte	Di Angelo
15.	"Eres Tan Barrial"	Wilson Padilla Almonte	Di Angelo
16.	"Que Lio"	Risa Encarnacion	La Bambola Slow
17.	"Wakala"	Wilson Padilla Almonte	Di Angelo
18.	"Cuckoo"	L. Stuart	Buddy Stuart
19.	"Shakin' Hands"	Sera Cahoone	Sera Cahoone
20.	"Eastern Dawn"	Midori
21.	"Five Treasures"	Christopher Lewis, Gaynor O'Flynn and Sachidanand Rauniyar
22.	"Home on the Range"
23.	"Beets Untitled"	Laura Anne Stevenson	Laura Stevenson & The Cans
24.	"I Like the Way You Love Me"	Alfred Smith	Brenton Wood
25.	"Holy Holy Holy"
26.	"Across the Wide Missouri"		Cash McCall
27.	"Chocolat"	Graham D.H. Preskett

== See also ==
- Rosemary's Baby
- Inseminoid
- The Ward
