= Glenn McQuaid =

Irish film director

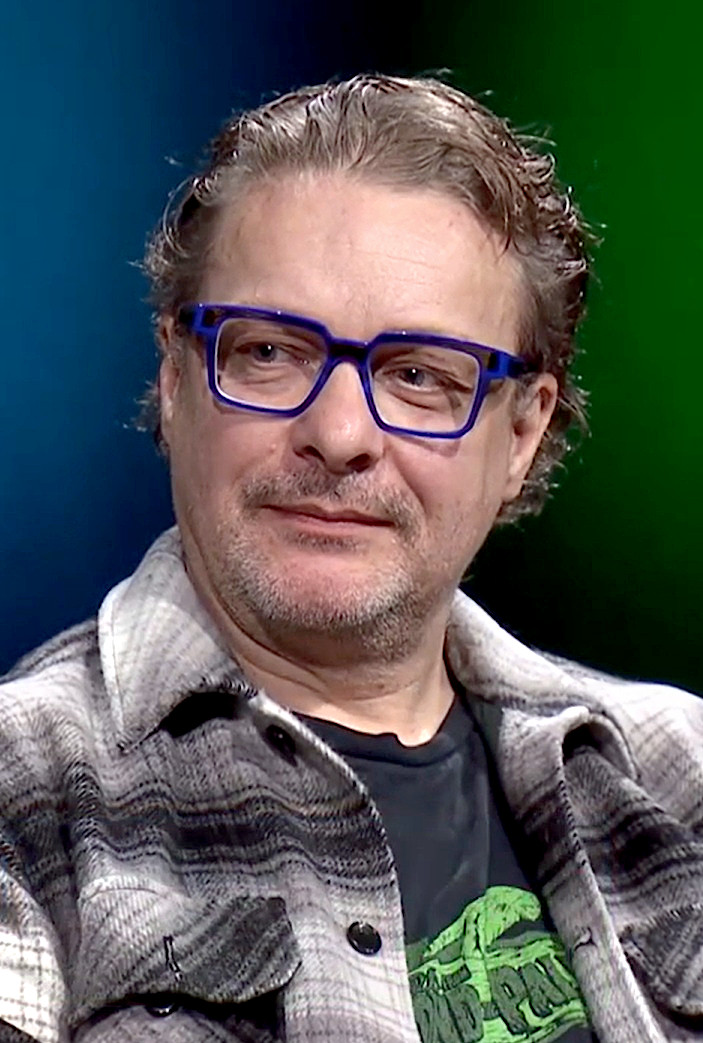
- McQuaid at DIFF 2026
- Born: 1972 or 1973 (age 52–53); Dublin, Ireland
- Occupations: Film director, screenwriter
- Years active: 2008–present
- Notable work: I Sell the Dead

Glenn McQuaid (born 1973) is an Irish film director. He is known for his feature film debut I Sell the Dead and for directing The Restoration at Grayson Manor (2025), as well as his involvement in the audio play anthology series Tales From Beyond the Pale, both of which were produced by frequent collaborator Larry Fessenden's Glass Eye Pix. He has also directed a segment of the anthology horror film V/H/S.

== Career ==
McQuaid began his career at Glass Eye Pix, where he performed visual effects on films such as The Roost (2005) and The Last Winter (2006). Inspired by the muted reception of one of his short films, he made his feature directorial debut with I Sell the Dead (2008), which took a more comedic approach. He has cited David Cronenberg as an influence. Rotten Tomatoes reports the film holds a 73% approval rating based on 44 reviews. After I Sell the Dead, he directed the segment Tuesday the 17th in V/H/S, a 2012 horror anthology film, drawing inspiration from early 1980s slasher films. In 2014, he directed The Trouble with Dad, a segment in Chilling Visions: 5 States of Fear, which was inspired by his father's Alzheimer's diagnosis and decline, interpreted through the lens of EC horror comics.

McQuaid later collaborated again with Larry Fessenden on the audio anthology series Tales From Beyond the Pale, which he co-created.

In 2025, McQuaid directed the feature film The Restoration at Grayson Manor, which he co-wrote with Clay McLeod Chapman. The film, a horror comedy, stars Alice Krige and Chris Colfer. McQuaid has described the film as a queer, melodramatic "house of horrors", citing The Lion in Winter and The Old Dark House as influences. Rotten Tomatoes reports the film holds a 100% approval rating based on 15 reviews.

In addition to filmmaking, McQuaid records music under the name Witchboard, with releases on Library of the Occult and Holy Mountain Printing. He also co-composed the score for The Restoration at Grayson Manor with Reuben Harvey.

== Personal life ==
McQuaid was born in Dublin, Ireland. He lived in New York City, New York for 20 years. In 2018 he returned to Dublin, Ireland. He is openly gay.

== Filmography ==
- I Sell the Dead (2008)
- V/H/S (2012), segment Tuesday the 17th
- Chilling Visions: 5 States of Fear (2014), segment The Trouble with Dad
- The Restoration at Grayson Manor (2025)
