= V/H/S/99 =

2022 American film

- Promotional release poster
- Directed by: Maggie Levin ("Shredding"); Johannes Roberts ("Suicide Bid"); Flying Lotus ("Ozzy's Dungeon"); Tyler MacIntyre ("The Gawkers"); Vanessa & Joseph Winter ("To Hell and Back")
- Written by: Maggie Levin ("Shredding"); Johannes Roberts ("Suicide Bid"); Zoe Cooper ("Ozzy's Dungeon"); Flying Lotus ("Ozzy's Dungeon"); Tyler MacIntyre ("The Gawkers"); Chris Lee Hill ("The Gawkers"); Vanessa & Joseph Winter ("To Hell and Back")
- Produced by: Josh Goldbloom; Brad Miska; David Bruckner; Radio Silence; Chad Villella
- Production companies: Studio71; Bloody Disgusting; Cinepocalypse Productions; Radio Silence Productions
- Distributed by: Shudder
- Release dates: September 16, 2022 (TIFF); October 20, 2022
- Running time: 109 minutes
- Country: United States
- Language: English

V/H/S/99 is a 2022 American found footage horror anthology film produced by Studio71 and Bloody Disgusting. The sequel to V/H/S/94 (2021), it is the fifth installment in the V/H/S franchise. Set in 1999, the film features five found footage segments written and directed by Maggie Levin, Johannes Roberts, Flying Lotus, Tyler MacIntyre, and Vanessa and Joseph Winter.

The film premiered at the 2022 Toronto International Film Festival on September 16, 2022, and was released as a Shudder Original Film through the streaming service Shudder in the United States on October 20, 2022. Upon its release, V/H/S/99 broke streaming records on the service, including becoming its most-viewed premiere—a title which was held by its predecessor, V/H/S/94. It grossed $682,078 in home sales. A sequel, V/H/S/85, was released on October 6, 2023.

== Plot ==
The film is presented as an anthology of five short horror films. Unlike the previous installments, V/H/S/99 does not have an overarching frame narrative in between each short. Instead, short stop-motion animations of toy soldiers—made by Brady from "The Gawkers"—serve as interludes.

=== "Shredding" ===
- Written and directed by Maggie Levin

Punk rock band R.A.C.K.—acronym for its members Rachel, Ankur, Chris, and Kaleb—regularly record their antics on a web show that they host. For their latest video, the quartet break into the Colony Underground, a former music venue that burned down three years prior in an electrical fire which killed all four members of another band, Bitch Cat, after being trampled during a stampede.

As the quartet explore the venue, Ankur warns Rachel about his fear of the bhoota, having heard that they possess any person who defiles their resting place. However, Rachel, Chris, and Kaleb trick Ankur into believing that they are being possessed. An unimpressed Ankur storms off and declares that he hopes the bhoota kills them. The three remaining members produce inflatable sex dolls filled with gelatin and stomp on them to re-enact the stampede that killed Bitch Cat.

Suddenly, Kaleb is snatched into the darkness and his bloody, pulverised remains fall from above. Rachel and Chris attempt to escape until the zombified bhoota of Bitch Cat appear and seize their camera. Bitch Cat film themselves as they dismember and decapitate Ankur, Rachel, and Chris. The tape glitches out to reveal the re-animated and crudely reassembled remains of R.A.C.K.—now possessed by Bitch Cat—performing the band's old song on-stage as the footage ends.

=== "Suicide Bid" ===
- Written and directed by Johannes Roberts

College freshman Lily attempts to join Beta Sigma Eta, the most prestigious sorority on her campus. She performs a "suicide bid" in which she only applies to one sorority as her recruitment choice. The effort pays off as Lily is invited by the Beta Sigma Eta sisters to a nearby graveyard where, as part of the hazing ritual, she is dared to spend the night buried inside a coffin.

The sisters' leader Annie explains that it is meant to re-create an urban legend where another freshman, Giltine, was dared to commit the same deed to enter the sorority twenty years earlier. Giltine was forgotten by her classmates for a week and was rumored to have crawled into the underworld when the empty coffin was unearthed.

Lily enters the coffin with a box—whose content she is told will provide reassurance if her resolve falters—and a camera to film her ordeal; she opens the box to discover it contains several spiders. Terrified, Lily demands to be let out, but the sisters laugh at her torment. A sudden rainstorm commences just as a police car arrives to investigate the noises. The sisters flee and agree to exhume Lily in the morning. The officers make an investigation but leave, unable to hear Lily's muffled cries for help.

As the storm continues, the coffin is partially flooded by rainwater. When the water stops rising, Giltine's ghoulish spirit punches through the lid of the coffin and attacks Lily. The next morning, the sisters find the grave full of water and the coffin mysteriously empty; they agree to never speak of the incident but, that night, the sisters awaken, buried in coffins.

Lily, now a ghoul herself, appears with Giltine in Annie's coffin and explains that she has made a deal with Giltine, offering the sisters to her as replacements victims in exchange for her soul being spared. A tarantula crawls out of Giltine's mouth. Both undead girls then attack Annie and the sisters, who scream as the footage ends.

=== "Ozzy's Dungeon" ===
- Directed by Flying Lotus
- Written by Zoe Cooper and Flying Lotus

Young contestant Donna participates in Ozzy's Dungeon, a children's game show where people engage in physical challenges for a chance to descend into the titular dungeon and meet Ozzy, who will allow the winner to be granted a wish. During an obstacle course, Donna—whose wish is to help her poverty-stricken family leave their run-down neighborhood—suffers a serious open fracture to her leg and loses after the host does not stop the game so her injury can be properly tended to.

Sometime later, after Ozzy's Dungeon was cancelled, the show's former host awakens, stripped in underwear and locked in a dog cage, in the basement of Donna's domineering mother Debra, who is gradually revealed to have groomed her daughter to win the show at all costs. With the help of her browbeaten husband Marcus, their son Brandon, and Donna—who was left permanently injured after the incident, her leg becoming gangrenous—, Debra has the host filmed while he is forced through several torturous versions of the challenges from the show, threatening to douse him with acid if he refuses to comply.

When the host fails to complete the final challenge, Debra attempts to inject him with a syringe full of acid, but the host offers to bring the family to Ozzy and have their wish granted. The group then drives to the empty studio where Ozzy's Dungeon was filmed and the host leads the family inside through the rear entrance. The door is opened by the host's former assistant and it leads to a cave. Inside, the family discovers Ozzy on an altar, being worshipped by the assistant and people dressed in the attire of the show's contestants. As Donna is brought before Ozzy to tell him her wish, Ozzy undergoes metamorphosis, with his outer body splitting open to reveal a vaguely humanoid, spindly creature.

Granting Donna's wish, Ozzy proceeds to fire an energy beam out of his eye to melt the faces of the host and her family, killing them all. The camera freezes on Donna's menacing smile to it as the footage ends.

=== "The Gawkers" ===
- Directed by Tyler MacIntyre
- Written by Tyler MacIntyre and Chris Lee Hill

Young teenager Brady films stop motion videos of toy soldiers—the animations depicted in-between the film's segments—with his older brother Dylan's camera. While Brady records his latest video, Dylan takes the camera, which he uses to film himself practicing pick-up lines with his friends Kurt, Mark, and Boner. The quartet exclude Brady from their activities, thinking him to be a hopeless loser, and go out to pull pranks on the neighborhood residents and perform tricks at the local skatepark.

After concealing the camera to get secret up-skirt photos, the quartet become fixated on Sandra, an attractive young woman who has moved into the house across the street and whose yard is decorated with several stone busts. Brady later meets and befriends Sandra, who invites him into her house while he attempts to roller-skate, much to Dylan's shock and jealousy. The quartet compliment Brady for his newfound relationship with Sandra and beg him for information. Brady explains that Sandra invited him to help set up a new webcam and is enlisted to install a spyware on her computer and hack into her webcam in hopes of seeing her nude.

Brady reluctantly agrees and goes to Sandra's house that night. He installs the spyware despite being wracked with guilt for betraying her trust. As Brady leaves the room, the quartet watch Sandra through the webcam while she undresses. They became horrified when Sandra rips off her scalp to uncover a hair made of snakes—revealing that she is actually a gorgon. She also notices what the quartet is doing and leaps from her window to their house.

Sandra breaks into Dylan's room and kills Kurt, Mark, and Boner while Dylan flees. Brady attempts to reason with Sandra but she does not accept his apology and turns him into stone, then proceeds to petrify Dylan as well. Now fully transformed, she slowly approaches the camera, stuck in Dylan's stony hand, as the footage ends.

=== "To Hell and Back" ===
- Written and directed by Vanessa and Joseph Winter

On New Year's Eve, videographer best friends Nate and Troy are hired by a coven of witches to film them performing a ritual where a woman named Kirsten volunteers to be offered as a vessel to a powerful demon known as Ukabon. Despite agreeing, Nate is skeptical of them and thinks that the ritual may be a prank. The witches tell the duo that they will not actually summon Ukabon until the stroke of midnight on the new millennium, when the veil between Earth and Hell is at its thinnest.

As the ritual begins, Furcas—an uninvited demon who has disrupted the witches' rituals before—makes its presence known. The witches attempt to cast it out, but Furcas grabs Nate and Troy and drags them underneath the witches' altar. As the camera glimpses Furcas retreating, Troy learns that he and Nate have been sent to Hell. The duo encounter bloodthirsty demons, hazardous traps, and mutilated bodies spread throughout the cavernous landscape. They also cross paths with Mabel, a damned soul who speaks in archaic terms and explains that they are irresistible to hungry demons due to their mortality.

Mabel decides to help the duo escape by leading them to Ukabon, whom she hates, in exchange for both writing her name in the witches' spell book. Since Ukabon is the only conduit through which the duo can return to Earth, they have only minutes to find him before midnight, or they are stuck in Hell for eternity. While trekking, Nate, Troy, and Mabel encounter more demons and eventually enter a cave where they find Ukabon, surrounded by a cult of masked demons, preparing to enter Kristen's body. The cultists attack the trio, but they manage to kill them.

As midnight rapidly approaches, the duo shout at Mabel to come with them to Earth, but she is fatally stabbed by Ukabon and reminds them to write her name in the book before dying. The duo jump inside Ukabon's cavernous stomach just as the witches' ritual commences. The duo successfully return to Earth, albeit with Nate possessing Kirsten's body; furious that their ritual has failed, the witches kill both Nate and Kirsten and argue about what went wrong. Troy attempts to flee, but is fatally wounded with a scythe. He uses his blood to write Mabel's name in the book, then succumbs to his injuries as the footage ends.

=== Epilogue ===
The tape returns to the previous segment; Dylan's and Brady's stone corpses are shown before the camera's battery dies. In the credits, the witches can be heard performing their ritual again, this time calling Mabel's name, a hint that she will return to Earth.

== Cast ==
=== "Shredding" ===
- Verona Blue as Deirdre
- Dashiell Derrickson as Chris Carbonara
- Tybee Diskin as RC
- Jackson Kelly as Kaleb
- Jesse LaTourette as Rachel
- Kelley Missal as Jessie
- Melissa Macedo as Jessie Deux
- Aminah Nieves as Charissa
- Keanush Tafreshi as Ankur

=== "Suicide Bid" ===
- Ally Ioannides as Lily
- Isabelle Hahn as Annie
- Brittany Gandy as Lucy
- Logan Riley as Hannah

=== "Ozzy's Dungeon" ===
- Steven Ogg as The Host
- Amelia Ann as Donna
- Sonya Eddy as Debra
- Jerry Boyd as Marcus
- Charles Lott Jr. as Brandon
- Stephanie Ray as Ozzy
- Lauren Powers as Bodybuilder

=== "The Gawkers" ===
- Luke Mullen as Dylan
- Emily Sweet as Sandra
- Tyler Lofton as Kurt
- Duncan Anderson as Boner
- Ethan Pogue as Brady
- Cree Kawa as Mark
- Janna Bossier as Mom
- Wallis Barton as Emma
- Hannah Kat Jones as Cassidy
- Danny Jolles as Delivery Guy

=== "To Hell and Back" ===
- Joseph Winter as Troy
- Archelaus Crisanto as Nate
- Melanie Stone as Mabel
- James C. Morris as Furcas
- Kim Abunuwara as Jane
- Ehab Abunuwara as Husband
- Vickie Hayden as Witch Vickie
- Perla Lacayo as Witch Alex
- Ariel Lee as Wormaid
- Tori Pence as Kirsten
- Dustin Watts as Ukoban
- Coe-Jane Weight as Grandma Great

== Production ==
In September 2021, producer Josh Goldbloom stated that a sequel would only be possible if V/H/S/94 proved successful with streaming audiences. Soon after its release via Shudder, V/H/S/94 broke viewership records for the streaming company, which prompted a rush to produce a sequel in time for the following year.

The film was believed to be titled V/H/S/85 following a deleted social media post by actor Freddy Rodriguez in April 2022. The streaming service Shudder was to handle distribution, as it did with the previous installment. However, official confirmation of the film, titled V/H/S/99, came in July 2022 from Bloody Disgusting, who co-produced the film alongside Studio71, Radio Silence Productions, and Cinepocalypse Productions. The film was described to take place in the "final punk rock analog days of VHS". Flying Lotus, Johannes Roberts, Vanessa and Joseph Winter, Maggie Levin, and Tyler MacIntyre were announced as directors, with Goldbloom, Brad Miska, David Bruckner, Chad Villella, Matt Bettinelli-Olpin, Tyler Gillett, and James Harris serving as producers. The apparent V/H/S/85 was instead another entry in the franchise, which was officially announced on October 8, 2022. David Bruckner, Scott Derrickson, Gigi Saul Guerrero, Natasha Kermani, and Mike P. Nelson were announced as directors, with a 2023 release window by Shudder.

Goldbloom revealed that the first pitch to Shudder by the producers was a film set during Christmas, tentatively titled V/H/Xmas, as well as a film set during medieval times. Shudder ultimately rejected these pitches in favor of V/H/S/99.

== Release ==
V/H/S/99 premiered on September 16, 2022 in the Midnight Madness category of the 2022 Toronto International Film Festival. Its US debut was at the 2022 Fantastic Fest on September 25, 2022. The film also screened at the 2022 Sitges Film Festival in Barcelona on October 12, 2022, and at the 2022 Brooklyn Horror Film Festival on October 14, 2022. The film was released on Shudder on October 20, 2022.

The film released on Blu-ray and DVD in May 2023. Then followed by a release on the titular VHS format on June 7, 2023 by Witter Entertainment.

== Reception ==
=== Audience viewership ===
Upon its release, V/H/S/99 broke streaming records for Shudder. Through its first four days of release, the film registered 28% more unique viewers than the previous record holder, V/H/S/94, which premiered on the platform in 2021. V/H/S/99 also accounted for nearly 22% of all on-demand streams on Shudder during the same time period and was AMC+’s #1 most watched movie of the weekend.

Craig Engler, GM of Shudder said “By every metric V/H/S/99 has been a wild success.”

=== Critical response ===
On the review aggregator website Rotten Tomatoes, 75% of 55 critics' reviews are positive, with an average rating of 6/10. The website's consensus reads: "Like most anthologies, V/H/S/99 has its ups and downs -- but more often than not, this collection of shorts continues the franchise's recent creative rebound." Metacritic, which uses a weighted average, assigned the film a score of 58 out of 100, based on 12 critics, indicating "mixed or average" reviews.

Matt Donato of IGN praised the film as "the biggest gamble in the V/H/S franchise yet," commending the use of practical effects and the depiction of common phobias, such as the fear of spiders or being buried alive, to generate anxiety and terror. He concluded by stating that "V/H/S/99 capitalizes on frenzied found-footage fun, howls with blitzkrieg chaos, and keeps exploding like a firecracker bundle that loves to watch you wince," and rating it 7/10.

Writing for Dread Central, Emily Gagne stated that the film "may be the simplest and most streamlined V/H/S sequel yet." She praised the production design and the nostalgia factor that is incorporated into the film, affirming that "[V/H/S/99] has the potential to become a slumber party touchstone," and rating it 3/5 stars. In a review for That Shelf, critic Victor Stiff praised the film, stating that "[V/H/S/99 is] one of the rare horror anthologies with solid movies across the board. All five shorts give audiences something meaty to feast on."

In a mixed review for Variety, critic Dennis Harvey wrote that "[t]he best episodes are merely good enough, and the worst just tiresome." Harvey praised the "amusing stop-motion animations of toy soldiers" that serve as the film's interludes between segments, but concluded that V/H/S/99 "provides a watchable but underwhelming franchise clock-punch with no memorable highpoints."

== Sequel ==
A sequel was officially announced on October 8, 2022 at a New York Comic Con discussion panel promoting V/H/S/99. Much like its predecessor, the film was released as a Shudder Original, with directors David Bruckner, Scott Derrickson, Gigi Saul Guerrero, Natasha Kermani, and Mike P. Nelson attached to the project. The film was secretly shot back-to-back alongside V/H/S/99. V/H/S/85 was released on October 6, 2023.

== See also ==
- List of ghost films
