= Chloe Okuno =

American film director

- Born: Chloe Alexandra Okuno; August 1, 1987 (age 39); Los Angeles, California
- Occupation: Filmmaker
- Years active: 2007–present
- Notable work: Watcher

Chloe Alexandra Okuno (born August 1, 1987) is an American filmmaker. She wrote and directed the segment "Storm Drain" for the 2021 horror anthology V/H/S/94. Her feature film directorial debut, Watcher, premiered at the 2022 Sundance Film Festival in the U.S Dramatic Competition. Okuno has also directed several short films, including Slut (2014), which won several awards including the Jury Prize for Best Short Film at the Las Vegas International Film Festival.

== Early life ==
Okuno was born in Los Angeles and graduated from the University of California, Berkeley before graduating from the American Film Institute in 2014.

== Career ==
In 2021, Netflix purchased Rodney & Sheryl, a drama directed by Okuno and based on a true story. In April 2022, it was announced that Netflix was no longer involved with the film, now renamed The Dating Game and financed by AGC Studios and Vertigo Entertainment, sold to international distributors at the Marché du Film by AGC. Okuno eventually left the project, which was picked up again by Netflix and renamed Woman of the Hour, directed by its star Anna Kendrick.

Her feature directorial debut, Watcher, premiered in the U.S Dramatic Competition category at the 2022 Sundance Film Festival. The film was acquired by IFC Films' horror film division IFC Midnight and horror streaming service Shudder for distribution in the United States, with AGC Studios later selling international distribution rights to Focus Features.

Her vampire film entitled Brides was acquired by Neon for North American regions began production in October 2025 and was still in post-production by November 2026.

== Filmography ==
Short film

Year	Title	Director	Writer	Notes
2013	Full Circle	Yes	Yes	
2014	The Dotcoms	Yes	Yes	
2014	Slut	Yes	No	
2021	Storm Drain	Yes	Yes	Segment of V/H/S/94
2021	The Veggie Masher	No	Yes	Segment of V/H/S/94

Feature film

Year	Title	Director	Writer	Notes
2022	Watcher	Yes	Yes	Directorial debut
2026	Girls Like Girls	No	Story	
TBA	Brides	Yes	Yes	Post-production

Television

Year	Title	Notes
2022	Let the Right One In	Episode "What's Done in the Dark"
2024	Teacup	2 episodes
