= V/H/S/94 =

- Promotional release poster
- Directed by: Jennifer Reeder ("Holy Hell"); Chloe Okuno ("Storm Drain"); Simon Barrett ("The Empty Wake"); Timo Tjahjanto ("The Subject"); Ryan Prows ("Terror"); Steven Kostanski ("The Veggie Masher")
- Written by: Jennifer Reeder ("Holy Hell"); Chloe Okuno ("Storm Drain" and "The Veggie Masher"); Simon Barrett ("The Empty Wake"); Timo Tjahjanto ("The Subject"); Ryan Prows ("Terror")
- Story by: David Bruckner (Note: Credited with "anthology concept by"); Brad Miska
- Produced by: Josh Goldbloom; Brad Miska; Kurtis David Harder; Pasha Patriki
- Production companies: Shudder Original Films; Studio71; Raven Banner Entertainment; Cinepocalypse Productions; Bloody Disgusting Films; Hangar 18 Media
- Distributed by: Shudder
- Release dates: September 26, 2021 (Fantastic Fest); October 6, 2021
- Running time: 104 minutes
- Country: United States
- Languages: English; Indonesian

V/H/S/94 is a 2021 American found footage horror anthology film written by David Bruckner, and Brad Miska. The sequel to V/H/S: Viral (2014), it is the fourth installment in the V/H/S franchise and a prequel to the first three installments. Set in 1994, it comprises four found footage segments linked together by a fifth frame narrative directed by franchise returnees Simon Barrett and Timo Tjahjanto, in addition to newcomers Jennifer Reeder, Ryan Prows, Chloe Okuno and Steven Kostanski. It is the first film in the franchise not to be distributed by Magnolia Pictures' Magnet Releasing label. It was released as a Shudder Original Film through the streaming service Shudder in the United States on October 6, 2021, making it to be the first film in the franchise to be released on Shudder. V/H/S/94 became the service's biggest film premiere ever, with "record-setting viewership numbers" until it was surpassed by its sequel, V/H/S/99, released on October 20, 2022.

== Plot ==
The film is presented as an anthology of four short horror films, built into a frame narrative which acts as its own fifth short horror film. Each short is linked together with the concept of found footage.

=== "Holy Hell" (frame narrative) — Prologue ===
- Written and directed by Jennifer Reeder

The frame narrative focuses on a SWAT team—Slater, Oursler, Sprayberry, Spivey, Petro, and Nash—with their cameraman Gary as they raid a warehouse during what is believed to be a drug bust.

Moments before, a white-dressed woman inhaled a vapour from a substance on her hands. She has her eyes gouged out and counts down from ten as another woman passes behind. As the team find a jet behind the warehouse, a distorted voice welcomes them and asks them to "track the signal".

The team discover several rooms with televisions displaying static and spot a corpse in one of them, with his eyes gouged out and the substance dripping onto the floor. The team encounter more corpses; Slater orders to search the upper floor as one of the televisions begins to play a newscast.

=== "Storm Drain" ===
- Written and directed by Chloe Okuno
- "The Veggie Masher" commercial directed by Steven Kostanski and written by Chloe Okuno.

Channel 6 reporter Holly Marciano and her cameraman Jeff are filming a story about the urban legend of the Rat Man. The duo descend into a sewer drain, where the creature supposedly lives, and find several encampments.

When a man covered in a black slime-like liquid approaches them, they attempt to flee but are captured by similar people, who take them deeper into the sewers. A minister, who Holly had interviewed earlier, appears and announces that a new order will soon begin. He then summons the Rat Man, which is revealed to be a creature dubbed "Raatma". It vomits the liquid, which the minister pours over Jeff's face, burning him to death. Holly is then brought before Raatma and screams.

After a brief commercial break, Holly's co-anchor explains that she was rescued from the drain and has returned to work at the Channel 6 station, though Jeff is still missing. When Holly gives her report, she begins inadvertently saying Raatma's name in the middle of sentences and then suddenly vomits the liquid on her co-anchor's face. The co-anchor rips off his burning flesh while Holly cheerfully finishes her report, signing off with a "Hail Raatma" as the footage ends.

=== "Holy Hell" — First interlude ===
Back in the frame narrative, the team go deeper in the warehouse and come across a church-like room, with a television at the front and mannequins in the seats. The television's screen suddenly begins to play footage from a funeral home.

=== "The Empty Wake" ===
- Written and directed by Simon Barrett

Funeral home worker Hailey is assigned to host a wake for the recently deceased Andrew Edwards, whose family has requested that the service be recorded during the night. Hailey's boss Ronald and another worker, Tim, leave the building as a thunderstorm commences outside and the power flickers.

Hailey hears strange noises from Andrew's coffin and calls Tim to say that Andrew may still be alive. Tim quells her worries and explains that the body is most likely releasing gases that are causing the noises. A man named Gustav arrives to the funeral home, during which Hailey allows him to pay his respects; he thanks her for the opportunity and leaves. Hailey then calls her friend Sharon and asks her to check in the local obituaries for Andrew's name.

Sharon reveals to Hailey that Andrew had died by suicide, having leapt from a church's roof while shouting gibberish. The power goes out and the coffin suddenly jerks in Hailey's direction. She attempts to flee, but discovers the doors are chained shut. When Hailey returns, she finds the coffin tipped over and empty. Andrew's corpse attacks her, but he cannot see her because the top of his head is missing. Hailey hides behind the coffin and finds the top of Andrew's head, whose eyes lock onto her.

While Andrew finds and attacks Hailey, the tornado strikes the funeral home, killing them both. When it departs, a possessed Hailey rises and crawls out the window as the footage ends.

=== "Holy Hell" — Second interlude ===
The team discover body parts strewn across the floor and upside-down crosses hanging from the ceiling. They plan to leave the warehouse until the television's screen begins to play footage from a laboratory.

=== "The Subject" ===
- Written and directed by Timo Tjahjanto

An unnamed man wakes up to find his body has been replaced with robotic spider-like legs. He falls from his restraints and catches fire, which is soon extinguished by deranged scientist James Suhendra. He carries out a lobotomy on a woman with the initials "S.A." and sedates a man—dubbed as "Subject 98"—after he wakes up early.

Subject 98 is equipped with blades instead of hands, and S.A. becomes a cyborg that only responds to speech. From S.A.'s point-of-view, James celebrates her success as a report states that a rash of disappearances are driving wedges between the police and the populace, with James as the principal suspect. S.A. wakes up during the procedure and attempts to undo her restraints, but James repeatedly beats her before a team of soldiers—accompanied by their cameraman Jono—arrive to arrest him.

James is shot dead and the soldiers search his laboratory for survivors. They find S.A., and argue over whether she should be killed or kept alive as she is not classified as human anymore, despite technically being a survivor. A blackout occurs and Jono witnesses S.A. leave, but does not say anything. When a soldier shoots a door lock, an explosion triggers; James' contingency plan begins as Subject 98 awakens and slaughters most of the soldiers.

Jono and the team's commander survive after the latter hurls a grenade at Subject 98. Meanwhile, S.A. falls through a hole into a room, where she finds blueprints for her parts and sees herself in a mirror for the first time. She fights her way through the laboratory and discovers Jono hidden behind a door. S.A. spares him after he begs for his life. Jono promises to help her out. When the commander attacks S.A., Jono shoots him dead before both are attacked by Subject 98.

S.A. uses the last of her strength to tear out Subject 98's brain; she collapses next to Jono and her battery dies. Sometime later, a security camera shows S.A. standing up on her own accord and escaping the lab as the footage ends.

=== "Holy Hell" — Third interlude ===
It is revealed that Nash and Petro have killed Gary and kidnapped Spivey. When Slater pages his teammates over his radio, Petro states that he should try not to "lose his head"; Slater collapses and enters in a trance in front of the television's screen, which begins to play footage from an enclosure.

=== "Terror" ===
- Written and directed by Ryan Prows

A white supremacist group—Greg, Bob, Chuck, Terry, Steve, Tom, Wayne, Reed, and Jimmy—plot to blow up a government building to "take back America". They live in a well-secured compound where a man is kept prisoner. He pleads for his life, and Greg shoots him at range, revealing that the prisoner is a vampire. The group then drive past the building which they plan to blow up.

Slater—from the "Holy Hell" frame narrative—arrives to supply them with guns and ammunition. It is revealed that Greg repeatedly shoots the vampire and siphons his blood as he resurrects each time. The group inject his blood into a rabbit, which later explodes when is exposed to sunlight. They plan to use the blood as a bomb and, later that night, drink heavily and party until an emergency bell alerts them the next morning; Greg berates Jimmy, who was supposed to be on duty guarding the compound.

Jimmy runs towards Terry's corpse behind a truck while the group hear a screech inside the compound and Reed's severed head is thrown out from within. Wayne fires a machine gun on the compound, accidentally killing Chuck in the process. The others yell at him to stop, but his frenzy continues so Tom is forced to shoot him dead. When Steve stumbles out of the compound, covered in the vampire's blood, the group warns him to stop, but he is exposed to sunlight and explodes.

The remaining members vow to kill the vampire and enter the compound, where they learn the vampire is hiding in the attic. He tears Tom's face off and Greg shoots wildly at him. The vampire then kills Jimmy and Bob, and opens the window to let in sunlight. It causes him to explode and the entire compound to be destroyed—which also kills Greg—as the footage ends.

=== "Holy Hell" — Epilogue ===
Slater is tied to a chair by Petro and Nash, with Ousler, Sprayberry, and Spivey dead and their eyes gouged out. Nash rebukes Slater for supplying the supremacist group with guns and explains that she and Petro are members of the cult that has been operating out of the warehouse, where they create and distribute VHS tapes depicting disturbing and violent acts. (Note: As depicted in V/H/S (2012), V/H/S/2 (2013), and V/H/S: Viral (2014).)

Nash reveals that Slater will be the final kill for their newest tape and bashes his head repeatedly with the camcorder. After pulling it out, Petro shows Slater's heavily disfigured head; they believe it will be their best tape yet but wonder what to call it.

== Cast ==
=== "Holy Hell" ===
- Kimmy Choi as Petro
- Nicolette Pearse as Nash
- Thomas Mitchell as Sprayberry
- Dru Viergever as Slater
- Rodrigo Fernandez-Stoll as Spivey
- Dax Ravina as Oursler
- Kevin P. Gabel as Cameraman Gary
- William Jordan as Tom Tucker

=== "Storm Drain" ===
- Anna Hopkins as Holly Marciano
- Christian Potenza as Cameraman Jeff
- Brian Paul as Pastor
- Tim Campbell as TV Anchor Mark
- Gina Philips as Camille
- Hume Baugh as Camo Guy
- Sean Sullivan as Hippie
- Thiago Dos Santos as Raatma
- Kyle Durack as Storm Dweller
- Demetri Kellesis as Storm Dweller
- Sean Dolan as Skateboarder
- Sophia Machula as Skateboarder
- Anthony Perpuse as Skateboarder

==== "The Veggie Masher" ====
- Conor Sweeney as Himself

=== "The Empty Wake" ===
- Kyal Legend as Hayley
- Devin Chin-Cheong as Andrew Edwards
- Daniel Matmor as Gustav
- Adam Kenneth Wilson as Ronald
- David Reale as Tim

=== "The Subject" ===
- Shania Sree Maharani as S.A.
- Shahabi Sakri as Male Subject
- Daniel Ekaputra as Male Subject Alpha
- Budi Ros as The Creator / James Suhendra
- Donny Alamsyah as Capt. Hassan
- Bio One as Jono
- Vincent Martin as Ali
- Novi Rahmat as Jaka
- Sekar Dewantari as Failed Subject
- Andhika Martsanda as Spider Subject
- Andini Effendi as Announcer

=== "Terror" ===
- Christian Lloyd as Greg
- Thomas Mitchell Barnet as Cameraman Bob
- Cameron Kneteman as Chuck
- Steven McCarthy as Jimmy
- Brendan McMurthey-Howlett as Prisoner
- Slavic Rogozine as Steve
- Daniel Williston as Wayne
- Dru Viergever as Slater

== Production ==
=== Development ===
In June 2020, it was announced that a fourth installment of the V/H/S franchise was in development, titled V/H/S/94, and written by David Bruckner. The film was said to take the franchise in a different direction, with each anthology short film converging for the first time into a unified narrative. The title refers to the year in which the film takes place, 1994. The project was a joint-venture production between Bloody Disgusting Films, Cinepocalypse Productions, Studio71, Raven Banner Entertainment, and Shudder Original Films. Hangar 18 Media was brought onboard as Canadian service production company, with Pasha Patriki serving as Canadian producer.

Bruckner, who directed fan favorite segment "Amateur Night" in the original V/H/S, was set to direct the wraparound but dropped out due to commitments to Hellraiser (2022). Likewise, filmmaking collective Radio Silence (who also directed a short in the original film, "10/31/98") was set to direct a segment, but also stepped down to focus on Scream (2022). Unlike the previous entries in the franchise, where each segment was shot simultaneously with different crews, the filming for V/H/S/94 was largely sequential, with four out of the five shorts (save for "The Subject") having been shot in Toronto, Canada with overlapping crews. Writers Bruckner and Simon Barrett had prepared preliminary scripts for the wraparound plot, but those stories were ultimately cut in favor of Jennifer Reeder's script.

=== Filming ===
Principal photography was completed during the COVID-19 pandemic. According to producer Josh Goldbloom, the production teams built sets in hotels and conference rooms, and "in the spirit of the series punk rock roots [they] even ventured underground into a sewer."

During a Comic-Con@Home discussion panel on the film, Goldbloom added that the filmmakers had gone "very era-authentic with this iteration of V/H/S", using older video equipment, physical tape transfers and digital effects to make each segment look like amateur video from the 1990s. The directors also detailed some of their influences on making each short film, citing the events and video footage of the Waco siege, O. J. Simpson's Bronco chase, the Nancy Kerrigan-Tonya Harding assault and the Heaven's Gate religious group. Directors Reeder and Timo Tjahjanto mentioned David Cronenberg's Videodrome and infamous mondo shockumentary Faces of Death as inspirations, respectively. Tjahjanto concluded that "ironically, the latest V/H/S will probably be the grungiest looking."

In an interview for The Daily Texan, Goldbloom and the filmmakers explained how some of the segments achieved the deteriorated VHS look. The filmmakers shot their segments at 29.97 frames per second to emulate the shot-on-video aesthetic. According to director Chloe Okuno, her segment "Storm Drain" — inspired by horror film [REC] and documentary Dark Days — was shot digitally and then converted to tape and played over multiple times to purposefully degrade the footage. Director Barrett explained how his short was inspired by the 1967 Soviet horror film Viy and his desire to direct a film with the premise of someone having to watch over a corpse.

=== Marketing ===
An "exclusive first look" of V/H/S/94 was uploaded to YouTube on the official Comic-Con International channel on June 27, 2021, after a roundtable interview with the producers and directors. The short clip featured a portion of the segment "Storm Drain" by Okuno.

The first official still image of the film was released via Bloody Disgusting on September 9, 2021, to promote its announced world premiere at Fantastic Fest 2021. A week later, IGN premiered an exclusive official trailer for the film, which was then shared by Shudder and Bloody Disgusting on their respective outlets. That same month, film critics and horror film influencers were sent a care package from Shudder celebrating its "61 Days of Halloween" programming. Included in the package was a promotional faux VHS cover for V/H/S/94, with a fake cassette containing Halloween-themed candy.

On October 4, 2021, Shudder released a small promotional clip from the segment "Storm Drain" in anticipation for the film's release.

== Release ==
The film had its world premiere at Fantastic Fest on September 26, 2021. The screening was followed by a Q&A session with producer Goldbloom and directors Reeder, Okuno, Barrett and Ryan Prows. On October 4, 2021, the film was screened at Beyond Fest on a double-bill with the original V/H/S. The screening was followed by a Q&A session with producers Goldbloom and Brad Miska, and directors Okuno, Barrett and Prows. The filmmakers showcased the practical monster costume used in making the "Raatma" creature from the segment "Storm Drain".

V/H/S/94 was released in North America, Australia, New Zealand, Ireland and the United Kingdom exclusively through Shudder, on October 6, 2021. The film was released to Blu-ray and DVD on April 22, 2022, followed by a release on the titular VHS format on April 26, 2022.

== Reception ==
On the review aggregator website Rotten Tomatoes, 90% of 69 critics' reviews are positive, with an average rating of 6.7/10. The website's consensus reads: "V/H/S/94 gets the franchise back on track with a gory buffet of shorts that should delight horror anthology fans." Metacritic, which uses a weighted average, assigned the film a score of 63 out of 100, based on nine critics, indicating "generally favorable" reviews.

Critics praised the film's gritty aesthetic, creature and make-up effects, and embrace of 1990s video culture. Writing for Dread Central, Drew Tinnin found that "There’s a great balance of technical artistry and funhouse fright that keep the momentum building through every story," summarizing that "V/H/S/94 hits the same high notes as the original entry and even has some new twists and turns of its own," and rating it 3.5/5.

In a positive review, Brian Tallerico of RogerEbert.com said that while the film is not impervious to the "unevenness that is common to anthology horror," it nonetheless delivers "more hits than misses, and a general air of unhinged joy for the genre that these films often lack", rating the film 2.5/4 stars.

Film critic Paul Le concluded that the film "proves the V/H/S movies are still in a class of their own when it comes to macabre, found-footage storytelling." Adam Patterson of Film Pulse stated that "The low-definition depravity of the visuals fit nicely into the underground tape-trading scene by which the film was certainly inspired". He also compared the quality of the film's segments to those of the franchise's previous entries, affirming that V/H/S/94 "is the most consistent of the bunch." Critic Nathaniel Muir praised the originality of each short film, as well as the blending of horror, science fiction and dark comedy, asserting that "V/H/S/94 is arguably the strongest entry yet" in the series.

Melissa Hannon of Horror Geek Life wrote that the wraparound story was "weak," but praised the other segments. She concluded that "V/H/S/94 delivers impressive moments of horror, insanity, and gore, with some fantastic plot twists. It is sure to satisfy fans of horror anthologies, as well as longtime fans of the V/H/S franchise," rating the film 4.1/5 stars.

Siddhant Adlakha of IGN was more critical, stating that "All five stories in V/H/S/94 feature a cult-like element, but only one of them feels like a true work of madness," rating it 6/10. The Hollywood News' Kat Hughes praised the film's look and special effects, but criticized the pacing of some segments. She thought that the film "doesn’t quite capture that same spark that the original V/H/S ignited, but does prove that there is still life in this anthology series," rating it 3/5.

== Sequel ==
During a roundtable interview with Dan Tabor of Cinapse News, Goldbloom revealed that the production team "already got ideas for the next [V/H/S]" and that a potential sequel ultimately depended on the reception of V/H/S/94. On April 21, 2022, ComicBook.com reported that actor Freddy Rodriguez had posted a since-deleted Instagram photo seemingly confirming his involvement in a Shudder-produced sequel. The post included the hashtag #VHS85, hinting that the film would be set in the 1980s.

On July 28, 2022, a sequel V/H/S/99 was officially announced. Set in the year 1999, it explores era-related themes such as the rise of DVD technology and Y2K hysteria. The film shows "the final punk rock analog days of VHS while taking one giant leap forward into the hellish new millennium." V/H/S/99 is the first sequel since V/H/S: Viral to include only newcomers to the franchise, with Johannes Roberts, Flying Lotus, Tyler MacIntyre, Maggie Levin, and Vanessa & Joseph Winter directing. It was released through Shudder on October 20, 2022. It opened to positive albeit less enthusiastic reception from critics and fans alike.

Another sequel, V/H/S/85, was officially announced later on October 7, 2022. The unintended leak from Rodriguez earlier that year was actually referring to that particular film, produced discreetly alongside V/H/S/99. V/H/S/85 premiered September 22, 2023, at Fantastic Fest and was met with positive reception. It was released on October 6, 2023, via Shudder.

== See also ==
- List of ghost films
