= List of Shudder original programming =

Shudder is an American over-the-top subscription video on demand service featuring horror, thriller and supernatural fiction titles, owned and operated by AMC Networks.

== Original programming ==
=== Drama ===
Title	Genre	Premiere	Seasons	Status
Missions	Science fiction drama	September 28, 2017	2 seasons, 20 episodes	Ended
Deadwax	Horror drama	November 15, 2018	1 season, 8 episodes	Ended
Creepshow	Horror anthology	September 26, 2019	4 seasons, 25 episodes	Ended
Blood Machines	Horror	May 21, 2020	1 season, 3 episodes	Ended
Deadhouse Dark	Horror anthology	April 29, 2021	1 season, 6 episodes	Ended
The Creep Tapes	Found footage horror	November 15, 2024	3 seasons, 18 episodes	Pending
Hell Motel	Horror anthology	June 17, 2025	1 season, 8 episodes	Renewed

=== Unscripted ===
==== Docuseries ====
Title	Subject	Premiere	Seasons	Status
Cursed Films	Film	April 2, 2020	2 seasons, 10 episodes	Ended
Behind the Monsters	Film	October 26, 2021	1 season, 6 episodes	Ended
The 101 Scariest Horror Movie Moments of All Time	Film	September 7, 2022	8 episodes	Miniseries
Queer for Fear: The History of Queer Horror	Film/LGBT culture	September 30, 2022	4 episodes	Miniseries
Horror's Greatest	Film	August 27, 2024	2 seasons, 10 episodes	Ended

==== Reality ====
Title	Genre	Premiere	Seasons	Status
The Boulet Brothers' Dragula: Titans	Reality competition	October 25, 2022	2 seasons, 19 episodes	Renewed
Guts & Glory	Reality competition	October 14, 2025	1 season, 6 episodes	Pending

==== Variety ====
Title	Genre	Premiere	Seasons	Status
The Core	Talk show	November 16, 2017	1 season, 9 episodes	Ended
The Last Drive-in with Joe Bob Briggs	Variety show	July 13, 2018	7 seasons, 72 episodes	Ended

=== Co-productions ===
Title	Genre	Partner/country	Premiere	Seasons	Status
The Dead Lands	Horror drama	TVNZ/New Zealand	January 23, 2020	1 season, 8 episodes	Ended

=== Continuations ===
Title	Genre	Prev. network(s)	Premiere	Seasons	Status
Slasher (seasons 4–5)	Horror anthology	Chiller (season 1); Netflix (seasons 2–3)	August 12, 2021	2 seasons, 16 episodes	Ended
The Boulet Brothers' Dragula (seasons 4–7)	Reality competition	Hey Qween! YouTube (season 1); Amazon Prime/OutTV (seasons 2–3)	October 19, 2021	4 seasons, 40 episodes	Season 7 ongoing Renewed

=== Specials ===
Title	Genre	Premiere
Joe Bob's Wicked Witchy Wingding	Film talk show	April 24, 2026
Joe Bob's Savage Summer	Film talk show	July 10, 2026
Joe Bob's Halloween House Party	Film talk show	October 23, 2026
Awaiting release
Joe Bob Conquers Christmas	Film talk show	December 6, 2026

=== Podcasts ===
Title	Genre	Year of release	Episodes	Status, notes
Darkest Night	Horror, science fiction	2016–2018	20	Ended
Deadly Manners	Dark comedy, murder mystery	2017	10	Ended
Video Palace	Analog horror	2018	10	Ended
Narrow Caves	Horror	2018	8	Ended; produced by Fangoria
Congeria	Horror	2018	10	Ended
She Kills	Non-fiction	2019	10	Ended

== Original films ==
=== Feature films ===
Title	Genre	Country	Premiere	Length
Revenge	Rape and revenge	France	September 13, 2018	1 h 48 min
Satan's Slaves	Horror	Indonesia	October 4, 2018	1 h 47 min
Terrified	Horror	Argentina	October 11, 2018	1 h 27 min
The Witch in the Window	Supernatural horror	United States	October 18, 2018	1 h 17 min
The Ranger	Slasher	United States	May 9, 2019	1 h 20 min
Party Hard, Die Young	Slasher	Germany	July 3, 2019	1 h 39 min
Deadtectives	Horror comedy	United States	July 18, 2019	1 h 32 min
Gwen	Folk horror	United Kingdom	August 16, 2019	1 h 26 min
Belzebuth	Horror	Mexico	August 29, 2019	1 h 54 min
The Wrath	Horror mystery	South Korea	September 5, 2019	1 h 34 min
Christmas Presence	Horror	United States	December 3, 2019	1 h 25 min
The Marshes	Supernatural horror	Australia	January 9, 2020	1 h 25 min
Dogs Don't Wear Pants	Erotic black comedy	Finland	February 8, 2020	1 h 45 min
Jessica Forever	Fantasy sci-fi drama	France	February 20, 2020	1 h 37 min
The Room	Thriller	France	March 12, 2020	1 h 40 min
0.0MHz	Supernatural horror	South Korea	April 23, 2020	1 h 41 min
Blood Quantum	Horror	Canada	April 28, 2020	1 h 38 min
Z	Horror	Canada	May 7, 2020	1 h 23 min
Monstrum	Period action horror	South Korea	May 14, 2020	1 h 45 min
Warning: Do Not Play	Horror mystery	South Korea	June 11, 2020	1 h 26 min
Scare Package	Horror comedy anthology	United States	June 18, 2020	1 h 47 min
Yummy	Horror comedy	Belgium	June 25, 2020	1 h 36 min
Metamorphosis	Supernatural horror	South Korea	July 2, 2020	1 h 53 min
The Beach House	Horror	United States	July 9, 2020	1 h 28 min
Lake of Death	Supernatural horror	Norway	July 16, 2020	1 h 34 min
Impetigore	Horror	Indonesia	July 23, 2020	1 h 46 min
Host	Supernatural horror	United Kingdom	July 30, 2020	56 min
La Llorona	Horror	Guatemala	August 6, 2020	1 h 36 min
Random Acts of Violence	Slasher	Canada/United States	August 20, 2020	1 h 20 min
Spiral	Horror thriller	Canada	September 17, 2020	1 h 30 min
Scare Me	Horror comedy	United States	October 1, 2020	1 h 44 min
The Cleansing Hour	Horror	United States	October 8, 2020	1 h 34 min
The Mortuary Collection	Anthology	United States	October 15, 2020	1 h 48 min
May the Devil Take You Too	Horror	Indonesia	October 29, 2020	1 h 50 min
Lingering	Supernatural horror	South Korea	November 12, 2020	1 h 41 min
Anything for Jackson	Supernatural horror	Canada	December 3, 2020	1 h 37 min
Hunted	Survival thriller	Belgium	January 14, 2021	1 h 36 min
The Queen of Black Magic	Supernatural horror	Indonesia	January 28, 2021	1 h 39 min
A Nightmare Wakes	Psychological thriller	United States	February 4, 2021	1 h 30 min
Shook	Horror	United States	February 18, 2021	1 h 24 min
Lucky	Horror	United States	March 4, 2021	1 h 23 min
Stay Out of the Attic	Horror	United States	March 11, 2021	1 h 20 min
Slaxx	Horror comedy	Canada	March 18, 2021	1 h 17 min
Violation	Horror	Canada	March 25, 2021	1 h 47 min
The Banishing	Horror	United Kingdom	April 15, 2021	1 h 37 min
Fried Barry	Horror comedy	South Africa	May 7, 2021	1 h 39 min
Skull: The Mask	Slasher	Brazil	May 27, 2021	1 h 30 min
Caveat	Horror	Ireland	June 3, 2021	1 h 28 min
Superdeep	Horror	Russia	June 17, 2021	1 h 55 min
An Unquiet Grave	Horror	United States	June 24, 2021	1 h 12 min
Vicious Fun	Horror comedy	Canada	June 29, 2021	1 h 41 min
Son	Horror thriller	Ireland/United States	July 8, 2021	1 h 38 min
Kandisha	Horror	France	July 22, 2021	1 h 25 min
The Boy Behind the Door	Horror thriller	United States	July 29, 2021	1 h 28 min
Teddy	Horror comedy	France	August 5, 2021	1 h 28 min
Bleed with Me	Horror	Canada	August 10, 2021	1 h 20 min
Superhost	Horror	Canada	September 2, 2021	1 h 24 min
Martyrs Lane	Horror	United Kingdom	September 9, 2021	1 h 36 min
V/H/S/94	Anthology	United States	October 6, 2021	1 h 40 min
Horror Noire	Anthology	United States	October 28, 2021	2 h 33 min
Dead & Beautiful	Horror drama	Netherlands/Taiwan	November 4, 2021	1 h 38 min
The Strings	Horror	Canada	November 23, 2021	1 h 34 min
The Advent Calendar	Horror thriller	France/Belgium	December 2, 2021	1 h 44 min
Death Valley	Action horror	Canada	December 9, 2021	1 h 31 min
The Last Thing Mary Saw	Folk horror	United States	January 20, 2022	1 h 29 min
Slapface	Horror	United States	February 3, 2022	1 h 25 min
All the Moons	Fantasy horror	Spain/France	February 10, 2022	1 h 42 min
They Live in the Grey	Supernatural horror	United States	February 17, 2022	2 h 3 min
Hellbender	Horror	United States	February 24, 2022	1 h 26 min
The Seed	Body horror	United Kingdom	March 10, 2022	1 h 31 min
Night's End	Horror	United States	March 31, 2022	1 h 21 min
The Cellar	Supernatural horror	Ireland	April 15, 2022	1 h 34 min
Virus:32	Horror	Argentina/Uruguay	April 21, 2022	1 h 30 min
The Twin	Psychological horror	Finland	May 6, 2022	1 h 49 min
The Sadness	Action horror	Taiwan	May 12, 2022	1 h 39 min
Mad God	Stop motion	United States	June 16, 2022	1 h 23 min
Revealer	Horror	United States	June 23, 2022	1 h 26 min
Good Madam	Horror	South Africa	July 14, 2022	1 h 32 min
Moloch	Folk horror	Netherlands	July 21, 2022	1 h 39 min
What Josiah Saw	Psychological horror	United States	August 4, 2022	2 h 0 min
Glorious	Horror comedy	United States	August 18, 2022	1 h 29 min
Who Invited Them	Horror	United States	September 1, 2022	1 h 21 min
Saloum	Horror thriller	Senegal	September 8, 2022	1 h 24 min
Speak No Evil	Psychological horror	Denmark/Netherlands	September 15, 2022	1 h 37 min
Raven's Hollow	Thriller	United Kingdom	September 22, 2022	1 h 38 min
Sissy	Psychological horror	Australia	September 29, 2022	1 h 42 min
Deadstream	Horror comedy	United States	October 6, 2022	1 h 27 min
Dark Glasses	Giallo	Italy/France	October 13, 2022	1 h 26 min
V/H/S/99	Anthology	United States	October 20, 2022	1 h 39 min
Satan's Slaves 2: Communion	Horror	Indonesia	November 4, 2022	1 h 59 min
Mandrake	Horror	United Kingdom	November 10, 2022	1 h 25 min
Blood Relatives	Horror comedy	United States	November 22, 2022	1 h 28 min
A Wounded Fawn	Horror	United States	December 1, 2022	1 h 31 min
Christmas Bloody Christmas	Slasher	United States	December 9, 2022	1 h 27 min
Scare Package II: Rad Chad's Revenge	Horror comedy anthology	United States	December 22, 2022	1 h 38 min
Sorry About the Demon	Horror comedy	United States	January 19, 2023	1 h 45 min
Skinamarink	Horror	Canada	February 2, 2023	1 h 40 min
Attachment	Romantic horror	Denmark	February 9, 2023	1 h 45 min
Spoonful of Sugar	Horror	United States	March 2, 2023	1 h 34 min
Leave	Horror	Norway	March 16, 2023	1 h 46 min
The Unheard	Horror	United States	March 31, 2023	2 h 05 min
From Black	Horror	United States	April 28, 2023	1 h 50 min
Influencer	Psychological horror	United States	May 26, 2023	1 h 32 min
Brooklyn 45	Supernatural thriller	United States	June 9, 2023	1 h 32 min
Quicksand	Survival thriller	Colombia	July 14, 2023	1 h 26 min
The Communion Girl	Horror	Spain	August 11, 2023	1 h 38 min
Bad Things	Horror thriller	United States	August 18, 2023	1 h 23 min
Perpetrator	Horror	United States/France	September 1, 2023	1 h 40 min
Blood Flower	Horror	Malaysia	September 8, 2023	1 h 42 min
Elevator Game	Horror	United States	September 15, 2023	1 h 34 min
Nightmare	Horror	Norway	September 29, 2023	1 h 40 min
V/H/S/85	Anthology	United States	October 6, 2023	1 h 50 min
The Puppetman	Horror thriller	United States	October 13, 2023	1 h 36 min
Night of the Hunted	Thriller	United States/France	October 20, 2023	1 h 36 min
When Evil Lurks	Supernatural horror	Argentina/United States	October 27, 2023	1 h 39 min
Birth/Rebirth	Psychological horror	United States	November 10, 2023	1 h 38 min
The Sacrifice Game	Horror	United States	December 8, 2023	1 h 30 min
Destroy All Neighbors	Horror comedy	United States	January 12, 2024	1 h 25 min
History of Evil	Thriller	United States	February 23, 2024	1 h 37 min
You'll Never Find Me	Horror	Australia	March 22, 2024	1 h 40 min
Late Night with the Devil	Supernatural horror	Australia/United States	April 19, 2024	1 h 33 min
Infested	Horror	France/United States	April 26, 2024	1 h 46 min
Nightwatch: Demons Are Forever	Horror	Denmark	May 17, 2024	1 h 50 min
Stopmotion	Psychological horror	United Kingdom	May 31, 2024	1 h 33 min
The Devil's Bath	Period drama	Austria/Germany	June 28, 2024	2 h 01 min
Hell Hole	Horror	United States	August 23, 2024	1 h 32 min
The Demon Disorder	Horror	Australia	September 6, 2024	1 h 25 min
In a Violent Nature	Slasher	Canada	September 13, 2024	1 h 34 min
Oddity	Supernatural horror	Ireland	September 27, 2024	1 h 38 min
V/H/S/Beyond	Anthology	United States	October 4, 2024	1 h 54 min
Daddy's Head	Horror	United Kingdom	October 11, 2024	1 h 32 min
Mads	Horror thriller	France	October 18, 2024	1 h 26 min
Azrael	Action horror	United States	October 25, 2024	1 h 25 min
Black Cab	Horror thriller	United States	November 8, 2024	1 h 28 min
Rita	Fantasy horror	Guatemala/United States	November 22, 2024	1 h 47 min
Grafted	Horror	New Zealand	January 24, 2025	1 h 36 min
Dark Match	Horror	Canada	January 31, 2025	1 h 34 min
The Dead Thing	Horror	United States	February 14, 2025	1 h 34 min
The Rule of Jenny Pen	Horror	New Zealand	March 28, 2025	1 h 43 min
825 Forest Road	Horror	United States	April 4, 2025	1 h 41 min
Shadow of God	Horror	Canada	April 11, 2025	1 h 27 min
Dead Mail	Horror	United States	April 18, 2025	1 h 46 min
Fréwaka	Horror	Ireland	April 25, 2025	1 h 43 min
The Ugly Stepsister	Horror	Norway	May 9, 2025	1 h 45 min
The Surrender	Horror	Canada/United States	May 23, 2025	1 h 30 min
Best Wishes to All	Horror	Japan	June 13, 2025	1 h 29 min
Push	Horror	United States	July 11, 2025	1 h 29 min
Night of the Reaper	Slasher	United States	September 19, 2025	1 h 33 min
V/H/S/Halloween	Anthology	United States	October 3, 2025	1 h 55 min
Other	Horror	France/Belgium	October 17, 2025	1 h 35 min
Hell House LLC: Lineage	Horror	United States	October 30, 2025	1 h 48 min
Good Boy	Horror	United States	November 21, 2025	1 h 12 min
Reflection in a Dead Diamond	Mystery thriller	Belgium/Luxembourg/Italy/France	December 5, 2025	1 h 27 min
Influencers	Horror thriller	United States/Canada	December 12, 2025	1 h 50 min
Mother of Flies	Horror	United States	January 23, 2026	1 h 32 min
Honey Bunch	Horror	Canada/United States	February 13, 2026	1 h 53 min
Crazy Old Lady	Horror	Argentina/Spain/United States	February 27, 2026	1 h 34 min
Bodycam	Horror	Canada	March 13, 2026	1 h 15 min
The Mortuary Assistant	Horror	United States	March 27, 2026	1 h 31 min
Dolly	Horror	United States	April 24, 2026	1 h 23 min
Smothered	Horror	Indonesia	May 29, 2026	1 h 33 min
Find Your Friends	Thriller	United States/Italy	June 12, 2026	1 h 29 min
The Voices of Our Mother	Horror	Canada	June 19, 2026	1 h 33 min
Forbidden Fruits	Horror comedy	United States	June 26, 2026	1 h 43 min
Faces of Death	Horror	United States	July 10, 2026	1 h 37 min
Saccharine	Horror	Australia	July 24, 2026	1 h 53 min
Nightborn	Fantasy horror	Finland	July 31, 2026	1 h 32 min
Hellcat	Horror	United States	August 14, 2026	1 h 31 min
Penny Lane Is Dead	Horror	Australia	August 28, 2026	1 h 28 min
Parasomnia	Horror	United States	September 4, 2026	1 h 25 min
Goody Goody	Thriller	United States	September 18, 2026	1 h 20 min
Bloody Tennis	Horror	Germany	September 25, 2026	1 h 25 min
Infirmary	Horror	United States	October 2, 2026	1 h 25 min
V/H/S/Mixtape	Anthology	United States	October 9, 2026	1 h 38 min
Hallowarrior	Horror thriller	United States	October 16, 2026	1 h 18 min
The Cycle	Horror	United Kingdom	October 23, 2026	1 h 51 min
New Group	Comedy horror	Japan	November 6, 2026	1 h 22 min
Awaiting release
The Holy Boy	Folk horror	Italy	November 27, 2026	2 h 2 min
Unholy Night	Horror comedy	United States	December 4, 2026	TBA
Red Snow	Horror fantasy	Finland	December 11, 2026	TBA

=== Documentaries ===
Title	Country	Premiere	Length
Horror Noire: A History of Black Horror	United States	February 7, 2019	1 h 23 min
The Boulet Brothers' Dragula: Resurrection	United States	October 20, 2020	2 h 04 min
Leap of Faith: William Friedkin on The Exorcist	United States	November 19, 2020	1 h 44 min
The Found Footage Phenomenon	United Kingdom	May 19, 2022	1 h 41 min
Sharksploitation	United States	July 21, 2023	1 h 46 min
Dario Argento Panico	Italy/United Kingdom	February 2, 2024	1 h 38 min
Doc of Chucky	United States	November 1, 2024	4 h 55 min
1000 Women in Horror	United States	March 20, 2026	1 h 36 min

== Upcoming programming ==
=== Feature films ===
Title	Genre	Country	Premiere	Length
Breeder	Horror thriller	Canada/United States	Late 2026	97 minutes
The Creep	Horror	United Kingdom	2026	TBA
