= Hell House LLC =

2015 film by Stephen Cognetti

- Theatrical release poster
- Directed by: Stephen Cognetti
- Written by: Stephen Cognetti
- Produced by: Joe Bandelli
- Starring: Danny Bellini; Ryan Jennifer Jones; Gore Abrams; Jared Hacker; Adam Schneider
- Cinematography: Brian C. Harnick
- Production companies: Cognetti Films; Marylous' Boys
- Distributed by: Terror Films
- Release dates: October 16, 2015 (Telluride Horror Show); October 29, 2026 (United States)
- Running time: 93 minutes
- Country: United States
- Language: English

Hell House LLC is a 2015 American independent found footage supernatural horror film written and directed by Stephen Cognetti. It is the first installment in the Hell House LLC franchise. Produced by Joe Bandelli, it stars Ryan Jennifer Jones, Danny Bellini, and Gore Abrams. The film, shot as a documentary, follows a group of Halloween haunted house creators as they prepare for the 2009 opening of their popular haunted attraction, Hell House. Tragedy strikes on opening night when an unknown "malfunction" causes the death of 15 tourgoers and staff. The film reveals the lead-up to the tragedy and what really went wrong that night, the details of which have remained a mystery to the public. It was released on a number of video on-demand platforms, including Amazon Video, Shudder, YouTube, Vudu, and iTunes, on November 1, 2016.

A sequel, Hell House LLC II: The Abaddon Hotel, was released on September 20, 2018. A second sequel, Hell House LLC III: Lake of Fire, was released in September 2019, and a fourth, Hell House LLC Origins: The Carmichael Manor, was released in October 2023. All were released exclusively on Shudder. A fifth film, Hell House LLC: Lineage, was released in August 2025.

== Plot ==
On October 8th, 2009, an unexplained tragedy occurred at "Hell House", a haunted house attraction in the fictional town of Abaddon in upstate New York. Fifteen people, including nearly all of the staff, died in what authorities declared a severe malfunction. An investigative documentary team consisting of leader Diane Graves, cameraman Jonathan Miller, and editor Mitchell Cavanaugh track down the sole survivor of the tragedy, former Hell House staff member Sara Havel. She provides them with video journals.

Sara's video documents Hell House's arrival at the dilapidated Hotel Abaddon in Rockland County. As they prepare for Halloween, CEO Alex planned the attraction's climax, a scene in the basement where a person would be sacrificed to a cult.

Melissa, one of the employed local scare actors, shares with Alex and cameraman Paul rumors of the hotel's haunting. It was originally constructed by alleged cultist Andrew Tully, who chose the location because the town shares its name with Abaddon, a demon guarding the gateway to hell. In 1989, a young mother and her daughter disappeared while staying at the hotel. Though Tully was cleared of any wrongdoings, the hotel's reputation was ruined, and Tully hanged himself shortly after.

The Hell House team experiences several supernatural events, including a clown mannequin moving on its own, shadowy figures, and Paul and Sara seemingly being possessed. Despite concerns, Alex insists on opening the attraction on schedule. As the hauntings escalate, Paul considers quitting. Later that night, he disappears after being assaulted by a spirit. The next day, the crew finds Paul in the basement in a fugue state. Tony, the staff technician, quits after Alex continues to push forward. However, Mack convinces him to stay for Alex's sake.

Hell House opens to a large turnout but quickly goes awry. In the basement scene, Melissa is suddenly and brutally killed by a shadowy ghost cultist, causing a stampede of guests. In the chaos, Tony is killed trying to save Melissa. Mack and Sara find each other in the panic and flee to the attic, where they find Alex hanged. Sara flees as Mack is surrounded and killed by shadowy ghost cultists.

In the present, Sara asks for a break and provides them with her room number, 2C. She also suggests that the crew enter the Abaddon Hotel. Soon after, Diane and Jonathan attempt to leave a message for Sara at the reception, but are informed that nobody named Sara checked in and that room 2C doesn't exist. Diane and Jonathan decide to visit the Abaddon Hotel site. Mitchell stays behind to catalogue Sara's footage. He discovers footage after Mack was killed, where a possessed Paul kills Sara before slitting his own throat.

Diane and Jonathan break in to see the aftermath of what unfolded that night, ignoring Mitchell's calls. They go to the second floor, where they see a room labeled '2C'. When they enter the room, they find Sara sitting with her back to them. Diane and Jonathan try to flee but are attacked by a ghoulish Sara and two other shadow cultists.

== Cast ==
- Danny Bellini as Alex Taylor
- Ryan Jennifer Jones as Sara Havel
- Gore Abrams as Paul O'Keefe
- Jared Hacker as Tony Prescott
- Adam Schneider as Andrew “Mac” McNamara
- Alice Bahlke as Diane Graves
- Jeb Kreager as Martin Cliver
- Lauren A. Kennedy as Melissa
- Theodore Bouloukos as Robert Lyons
- Michayla Dougherty as Tour Goer April
- Phil Hess as Joey Sheffler
- Bailey Moyer as Dead Girl
- Kristin Taylor as Tour Goer Kate
- Regina Dvorin as unknown
- Miranda Robbins as Miranda Kelly (uncredited)
- Stephen Cognetti as Tour Goer Cameraman (uncredited)
- Angela Moyer as Sam (uncredited)
- Mason E. Welch as Bystander (uncredited)
- Joe Bandelli as Jonathan Miller (uncredited)
- Matt DePaola as Mitchell Cavanaugh (uncredited)
- Natalie Gee as Hotel Clerk (uncredited)

== Reception ==
Review aggregator Rotten Tomatoes gives Hell House LLC a 75% positive rating based on 12 critic reviews, with an average rating of 6.50/10. Dread Central gave the film a positive review, awarding it a score of 3.4/5. Found Footage Critic praised the cast, premise, and cinematography, giving the film a rating of 7.8 of 10. The Horror Society gave a score of 8.75 out of 10 and saying the mystery and suspense works for this film. SlashFilm also gave the film a positive review writing that "Stephen Cognetti's Halloween chiller marries found footage with haunted attractions, channeling a popular and rational fear." Luke Rodriguez of Modern Horror was more critical of the film, saying that "it doesn't quite stick the landing", but otherwise enjoyed the film.

== Release ==
The film premiered at Telluride Horror Show on October 16, 2015, released in Shudder on November 1, 2016, and in other digital platforms like Vudu, Amazon Instant, YouTube, Xbox, PlayStation, Vimeo, Google Play and ITunes. In September 21, 2026, Terror Films and Iconic Events announced on Instagram that the film will come to theatres for the first time ever on October 29, 2026 in celebration of its 10th anniversary.

== Sequels ==
In an interview with Geeks of Doom, Cognetti has stated that he sees the Hell House LLC trilogy as "one movie just divided into three acts and each movie is its own act". He further commented that he found it easy to write the second and third parts, as he knew "where I wanted to go with it from the get-go".
