= Bloodthirsty (2020 film) =

2020 Canadian film directed by Amelia Moses

- Film poster
- Directed by: Amelia Moses
- Written by: Wendy Hill-Tout; Lowell Boland
- Produced by: Wendy Hill-Tout; Michael Peterson; Alan Bacchus; David Bond
- Starring: Lauren Beatty; Greg Bryk; Katharine King So
- Cinematography: Charles Hamilton
- Edited by: David Hiatt
- Music by: Michelle Osis; Lowell Boland
- Production companies: Voice Pictures; 775 Media Corp
- Distributed by: Raven Banner Entertainment; Brainstorm Media
- Release date: October 1, 2020 (Fantastic Fest)
- Running time: 84 minutes
- Country: Canada
- Language: English

Bloodthirsty is a Canadian horror film, directed by Amelia Moses and released in to festivals in 2020 and commercially in 2021. It stars Lauren Beatty as Grey, an indie singer-songwriter who begins to transform into a werewolf while working at a remote wilderness recording studio with producer Vaughn (Greg Bryk). The film premiered on October 1, 2020, at the Fantastic Fest in Austin, Texas, and was released on video-on-demand on April 23, 2021.

== Plot ==
Indie singer-songwriter Grey Kessler suffers anxiety over having released a successful album and feels pressure for a successful follow-up. She also takes medication to try to stop dreams of herself as a wolf, and she appears to have other medical issues too, though her doctor can find nothing physically wrong.

A reclusive music producer, Vaughn Daniels, once a famous boy-band singer in the '90s, invites Grey to his remote mansion to write and record her second album. Grey's girlfriend, a painter named Charlie, learns Vaughn was tried but not convicted for murdering a singer named Greta. Despite misgivings, Grey accepts Vaughn's offer, and Charlie accompanies her.

As the creative process continues, Grey becomes more obsessive and begins ignoring Charlie's concerns. Vaughn pushes Grey, urging her to dredge up her darkest impulses for her songwriting. He taunts Grey's veganism, gives her absinthe to drink, and pushes Grey to complete a song that he says his wife, who had died by suicide, had started. Grey begins to crave and eat meat, and she falls deeper into a personal abyss. But her songwriting and performing improve. Charlie, seeing the darkness overtaking Grey, wants them both to leave, but Grey refuses and Charlie leaves alone.

Grey finds herself transforming into a werewolf. Later Grey confronts Vaughn, who reveals that he too is a werewolf, and Grey is his daughter. He was not certain before this, because her mother, Greta, whom he had shot and killed in self-defense, had told Vaughn, who was gone for months at a time with his band, that their baby had died. Meanwhile, Charlie decides to return for Grey but gets stuck in snow.

Grey completes her album and tells Vaughn she is leaving, that she will not end up like him. Vaughn sends his housekeeper, Vera, to bring Grey back and locks her in the recording studio to complete her transformation. She wakes after blacking out back in the guest room, having showered off a lot of blood. Running out to the road, she finds Charlie dead.

Returning to the house, Grey gets the gun and aims it at Vaughn, accusing him of killing Charlie. Vaughn helps her see that it was she who killed Charlie, but he assures Grey they are far from alone in the world. Vaughn begins to transform into a werewolf and Grey kills him with the gun.

The scene returns to the office of Grey's doctor as he shuts her file and suggests that she has been hallucinating. Later, Grey sings her song "Bloodthirsty" on stage, but there is no audience. Grey remembers or imagines leaving the mansion, bloody from having savaged Vaughn.

== Cast ==
- Lauren Beatty as Grey Kessler
- Greg Bryk as Vaughn Daniels
- Katharine King So as Charlie
- Judith Buchan as Vera
- Michael Ironside as Dr. Swan
- Jesse Gervais as Reporter
- Jayce McKenzie as Hitchhiker

== Production ==
The film originated with producer Mike Peterson. As Montreal-based director Amelia Moses recalled, "I was finishing up my first feature [Bleed with Me], and I was looking for some friendly advice from a producer about distribution in Canada." She was put in touch with Peterson, who told her he was seeking a director for a project. "He checked out my previous work and sent me the script, and I assumed it was still in development. But instead, he's like, 'No, we're shooting in two months in Alberta.'" Moses met with screenwriter Wendy Hill-Tout, who wrote the script with daughter Lowell Boland, "and then it all just happened really quickly." Boland, a singer-songwriter who performs under the single name Lowell and had released the album We Loved Her Dearly by this time, said the film's story grew out of her own personal experiences and the pressures she felt to produce a good second album.

Lauren Beatty, who had worked with Moses on Bleed with Me, said Moses "came on to this project pretty late and reached out to me because, obviously, the main character's [a] queer singer-songwriter and [she] knew that I'm both those things in real life, so she approached me with it." After getting the part, "I think it was within five days [that] I had to leave to start shooting. So Lowell had sent me all of the songs that would be in the film. I [had] had to learn [the song] 'Bloodthirsty' for the audition, so I already knew that one. But I had to learn piano in those five days ... just the chords that you actually see Grey playing...."

Greg Bryk said he had been shooting a movie Hill-Tout was directing and Peterson producing, "and they approached me and asked if I was interested in being a part of it."

Bloodthirsty was shot in three weeks, primarily at an old mansion southwest of Edmonton, Alberta, with some studio and bedroom shots done elsewhere in that city. Director Moses said the home was "strange and very different than the typical kinds of houses you'd see in Edmonton and lots of other cities. It also had a lot of stuff to work with. When you're working on a low-budget film, you don't have a lot of budget for set decoration, so this house had so much stuff — the man who owns it is a collector. He had a lot of stuff we were able to utilize [to] fill the space."

The werewolf effects were achieved through practical effects — makeup and prosthetics — and not CGI. Beatty said,

The makeup that you see is what we had on. That was partially due to budget, obviously. But, for Amelia, there was a big appeal in seeing the monster and human exist at the same time. I would go to the bathroom when I had this makeup on and I would look at myself in the mirror and I could recognize myself. It was my face built out into this monster. There is something really special that happens when you can see the human emotions through the werewolf makeup. You can still see me emoting. There was a bit more of subtlety to it.

The film's poster and trailer were released on March 24, 2021.

== Release ==
The film premiered on October 1, 2020, at the Fantastic Fest in Austin, Texas, held virtually that year. It also screened at the Telluride Horror Show festival in Colorado in 2020, and at the Calgary Underground Film Festival in 2021.

In February 2021, Brainstorm Media acquired the U.S. rights to the film and planned to release it in theaters and on video-on-demand on April 23, 2021. On March 21, 2021, Raven Banner Releasing said it had acquired the Canadian rights and planned to release it in theaters and on demand also on April 23, 2021. However, while it was released and reviewed, Bloodthirsty did not play in theaters.

== Awards ==
The film received two Canadian Screen Award nominations at the 9th Canadian Screen Awards in 2021, for Best Original Score (Michelle Osis and Lowell Boland) and Best Original Song (Boland, Evan Bogart and Justin Gray for "Grey Singing in Auditorium").

== Reception ==
=== Critical response ===
On review aggregator website Rotten Tomatoes, the film reports an approval rating of 82% based on 49 reviews. The site's critics consensus says, "Offering a hauntingly lush style and plenty of gore, Bloodthirsty successfully captures the nightmarish darkness behind being hungry like the wolf in the quest for fame." According to Metacritic, which assigned a weighted average score of 63 out of 100 based on 5 critics, the film received "generally favorable reviews".

The alternative weekly Austin Chronicle called it a "symphony in moonlight and nightmares", and commented that, "What's daring and innovative within the genre is that Lowell's script...dares to question the connections between dark art and those who are drawn to create." The horror specialty website Bloody Disgusting said the movie "takes a psychological approach, resulting in a slow-burn tale that favors mood over showier lycanthrope elements" and "employs a surreal, dreamy quality." On the other hand, "The intent behind Charlie's character is clear, but there's no emotional investment behind it to make us care." The industry trade magazine Variety also called it "slow-burning" and said that because "the pressures of the music industry [are] integral to the story...that emphasis may disappoint horror fans who want more of the fanged action.... But within its modest boundaries, 'Bloodthirsty' does a creditable enough job.... It may be one big metaphor, but as they go, 'Recording a second album made me a monster' has the ring of truth." The horror magazine Rue Morgue said the film's "lack of exposition...comes across as a graceful embrace of ambiguity and trust in the audience" until "at the height of the horror, the plot hits the brakes and instead subjects us to a thorough, verbal explanation about what has happened and what will happen." Still, it called the movie "an overwhelmingly poetic and disturbing film about an artist's struggle with identity amidst creation. The music is incredible and Beatty's performance is deserving of laurels."

On the negative side, the large city newspaper the Detroit News called it "a horror hodgepodge that shows its fangs but doesn't bite deep enough to leave a mark," and that while director Moses "creates a tense, moody atmosphere," Beatty's lead character "never operates or fills the room like a pop star of any magnitude, and Vaughn doesn't have the swagger of even an aging boy-band member." The general-interest RogerEbert.com said the movie "isn't as relentless or as disturbing as its name advertises" and that it "barely gets inside its antiheroine's head. ... There's not much in this movie that isn't neatly explained or blatantly implied by the movie's all-caps dialogue and slow-burn plot." The LGBTQ newspaper the Philadelphia Gay News conceded that Moses "does create a sense of dread with bloody images, but too much of 'Bloodthirsty' feels slight. There is a strong emphasis on mood, which is appropriate for psychological horror, but the slow-burn plotting feels lazy." Yet the film, it said, deserves credit "for putting lesbian characters in the center of the story and not making any of the drama about their sexuality."
