= Infirmary =

Infirmary may refer to:

- historically, a hospital, especially a small hospital
- a first aid room in a school, prison, or other institution
- a dispensary (an office that dispenses medications)
- a clinic
- Infirmary (film), a 2026 American independent found-footage supernatural horror film directed by Nicholas Pineda
