= Stay Out of the Attic =

- Directed by: Jerren Lauder
- Written by: Jason Scott Goldberg; Jesse Federman; Jerren Lauder; Julie Auerbach
- Produced by: Gary Auerbach; Julie Auerbach; Todd Beck
- Cinematography: Brian Sowell
- Edited by: Raymund Delmar; Joel Petrie
- Production company: Top Dead Center Films
- Distributed by: Shudder
- Release dates: October 15, 2020 (Atlanta Horror Film Festival); March 11, 2021 (United States)
- Running time: 80 minutes
- Country: United States
- Language: English

Stay Out of the Attic, also referred to as Stay Out of the Fucking Attic, is a 2020 horror film and the directorial debut of Jerren Lauder.

== Synopsis ==
Ex-convicts Imani and Carlos work for Albert Schillinger, a fellow ex-con who runs a moving company. They have been hired to move the belongings of the elderly Vern Mueller, who is willing to pay extra if they can move everything in a single night, with the exception of the attic and basement. During their work, Carlos discovers that Schillinger was part of the Aryan Brotherhood while he was in jail, but has since disowned that part of his life. The group also discovers that Vern is apparently obsessed with continuing the work of Josef Mengele and before they can leave, Vern traps them in the mansion. He releases a feral mutant and kidnaps Imani, taking her to his basement laboratory where he removes one of her eyes to concoct a rejuvenation serum.

Schillinger and Carlos discover Anne, a mute girl who has been sewn to her sister Sarah. Both girls help lead them to Imani; however, before they can save her, the mutant appears. In the scuffle Vern shoots Schillinger while Carlos and the girls flee upstairs and hide in separate rooms. Carlos chooses to hide in a bathroom that Vern informs him is actually a chamber where he kills failed experiments with Zyklon B. Vern turns on the gas and leaves; however, Carlos manages to escape the bathroom and kill the mutant before it can attack the girls. Carlos then collapses, seemingly dead.

When Schillinger comes to in the basement, Vern reveals that he is actually Mengele, having survived using the serum. He can only create this serum from the optic nerves of people who have suffered greatly; however, in doing so, he has to flee once he has killed too many people in the surrounding area. Mengele informs Schillinger that he saved him because of his ties to the Aryan Brotherhood, pointing out an eagle tattoo on his chest was clearly not a jailhouse tattoo and shows that he was of high rank. This horrifies Imani, as it means that he was a member prior to jail. Schillinger manages to trick Mengele into releasing him under the guise that he still holds Nazi sympathies and he uses this opportunity to free Imani. Ultimately, Imani and the girls escape the house while Schillinger remains inside. He confronts Mengele and carves off his eagle tattoo before crushing Mengele's skull. The film ends with Albert preparing to battle several feral mutants released by a dying Mengele and a mid-credits scene shows Carlos waking up upstairs. An after-credits scene shows Schillinger, Imani, and Carlos arriving to a new area, having all survived the previous horrors of the house.

== Cast ==
- Ryan Francis as Albert Schillinger
- Morgan Alexandria as Imani
- Bryce Fernelius as Carlos
- Michael Flynn as Vern Mueller/Josef Mengele
- Brynne Hurlbutt as Anne
- Avery Pizzuto as Sarah
- Garrett McClellan as The Creeper

== Release ==
Stay Out of the Attic had its world premiere on October 15, 2020, at the Atlanta Horror Film Festival. The following year it premiered on Shudder as one of its original films on March 11, 2021.

== Reception ==
Critical reception has been negative and the movie holds a rating of 25% on Rotten Tomatoes, based on eight reviews.
