= Inside of Me =

Inside of Me may refer to:

- Inside of Me (film), a 2009 short film directed by Robert X. Golphin
- "Inside of Me" (Madonna song), 1994
- "Inside of Me" (Dead by Sunrise song), 2009
- "Inside of Me" (Vamps song), 2016
- "Inside of Me", a song by 3 Doors Down from Us and the Night, 2016
- "Inside of Me", a song by Benny Benassi from Hypnotica, 2003
- "Inside of Me", a song by Eric Clapton from Pilgrim, 1998
