= The Battery (film) =

- Official film poster
- Directed by: Jeremy Gardner
- Written by: Jeremy Gardner
- Produced by: Jeremy Gardner; Adam Cronheim; Douglas A. Plomitallo; Christian Stella
- Starring: Jeremy Gardner; Adam Cronheim; Niels Bolle; Alana O'Brien
- Cinematography: Christian Stella
- Edited by: Alicia Stella; Michael Katzman
- Music by: Ryan Winford
- Production company: O. hannah Films
- Distributed by: FilmBuff
- Release dates: October 13, 2012 (Telluride Horror Show); June 4, 2013 (United States)
- Running time: 101 minutes
- Country: United States
- Language: English
- Budget: $6,000

The Battery is a 2012 American drama horror film and the directorial debut of Jeremy Gardner. The film stars Gardner and co-producer Adam Cronheim as two former baseball players trying to survive a zombie apocalypse. The film premiered at the Telluride Horror Show in October 2012 and received a video-on-demand release June 4, 2013. It has won audience awards at several international film festivals.

== Plot ==
After a zombie apocalypse has overtaken the entire New England area, two former baseball players, Ben (Jeremy Gardner) and Mickey (Adam Cronheim), travel the backroads of Connecticut with no destination in mind. Their backstory reveals that they were trapped in a house in Massachusetts, along with Mickey's family, for three months. Mickey's father, mother, and brother were killed before they figured out how to escape. Since then, Ben opposes sleeping indoors, and the two have had many arguments regarding the matter. Ben has long adapted to their new lifestyle, which includes scavenging for supplies and constantly being on the move. Mickey, on the other hand, longs for a “normal” life. He refuses to learn basic survival skills and constantly isolates himself by listening to his CD player with headphones, burning through batteries.

At Mickey's girlfriend's now-abandoned house, Ben finds two walkie-talkies. As they test the walkie-talkies' range, they overhear a conversation between two survivors, Annie (Alana O'Brien) and Frank (Larry Fessenden), implying they belong to an organized group of survivors called the Orchard. Mickey eagerly contacts them and asks to join, only to be flatly refused. Despite Ben's advice, Mickey tries contacting them again several times, but no one replies.

The duo travels further and explores a house inside a forest, where Mickey proposes sleeping inside. Ben relents, presumably to ease his friend's frustration, but keeps Mickey's CD player for the night. That evening, Ben drinks, listens to music, and dances, while Mickey speaks on the walkie-talkie. Annie replies and this time firmly tells him to stay off the channel and stop contacting her group.

The following morning, Ben discovers a zombie tied up near the house and releases it in Mickey's room. He keeps the door shut while urging Mickey to kill it with the baseball bat he left in the room earlier. After the sound of the struggle stops, Ben opens the door, discovering his friend has successfully scored his first zombie kill. Mickey angrily attacks Ben and storms outside. As Ben tries to cheer him up, Mickey breaks down in tears, telling Ben of his conversation with Annie.

Killing his first zombie and getting turned down by a community seem to have changed Mickey. He starts heeding Ben's advice, learns to fish, and spends much less time with his headphones on. As the two stop by the road to inspect a car, a man (Niels Bolle) takes Mickey hostage with a knife and orders Ben to give him their car keys. Ben tricks the man into letting Mickey go, then shoots and kills him. Immediately after, two other survivors arrive. The woman explains that the man stole the car from them, and says Ben did the right thing. Her companion Egghead (Jamie Pantanella) refuels the abandoned car, and they prepare to leave. Mickey, recognizing Annie's voice from the walkie-talkie, calls her by name. Annie, not wanting them to follow her to her group, shoots Ben in the leg and throws their car keys into a large grassy area, then leaves with Egghead. As it is too dark to find the keys, Ben and Mickey decide to sleep in the car.

Their car soon becomes surrounded by zombies. As Ben cannot move fast due to his wound, the two are forced to spend an undetermined number of days inside the car. They finally decide that Mickey should get out via the sunroof and try to find the car keys. When he returns, Ben sees that Mickey was bitten on the hand. Although Mickey pleads with Ben to let him live, Ben is forced to shoot and kill Mickey, letting out a scream of anguish. The movie ends with Ben talking to the walkie-talkie, claiming he will come and kill Annie to avenge Mickey's death. The mid-credit scene shows Ben has escaped the car and is walking down the road, with a horde of zombies shambling behind him.

== Production ==
The film cost $6,000 to make and was shot in 15 days in Connecticut. The scenes were not planned in advance, and director Jeremy Gardner described it as "very seat-of-the pants."

== Release ==
The film premiered at the Telluride Horror Show, a horror/genre film festival in Telluride, Colorado, and was released through various video-on-demand services on June 4, 2013. The film was released on DVD in America on September 16, 2014.

== Reception ==
Lauren Taylor of Bloody Disgusting rated the film 4.5/5 stars and said it is "an excellent example of what can truly be considered horror." Brad McHargue of Dread Central rated it 4.5/5 stars and called it "a triumphant feat of dramatic horror." In a positive review, Scott Weinberg of Fearnet wrote that it's not a zombie film for all tastes, but "there's certainly a lot to like here." Kurt Halfyard wrote that the film "is a very welcome case for what can be done with capable screenwriting." Kier-La Janisse of Fangoria rated the film 3.5/4 stars and called the film "the most reinvigorating take on this overworn subgenre I’ve seen in ages." Jerome Cox-Strong, in a 4/5-star review, said that "The Battery really does feel like it subverts the zombie genre – the main reason behind this being that it isn’t really a zombie movie at all." The film has an 80% approval rating based on 10 critic reviews on Rotten Tomatoes. Albert Nowicki of Movies Room ranked it among the fifteen best overlooked 21st century indie films.

=== Awards ===
Festival awards
Festival	Award
Academy of Science Fiction, Fantasy and Horror Films	Best DVD or Blu-ray Release
Buenos Aires Rojo Sangre	Best Film
Imagine Film Festival	Audience Award
Dead by Dawn	Audience Award
Toronto After Dark Film Festival	Audience Award (Gold), Best Screenplay, Best Music, Best Poster
Festival Mauvais Genre	Audience Award
Fantaspoa	Best Zombie Film
Chainsaw Award	Best Limited Release Film
