= V/H/S/Mixtape =

2026 American film

- Promotional release poster
- Directed by: Flying Lotus ("Gwar Is..." and "Another Cabin"); Renee Zhan ("Dance, Dance, Dance, Dance"); David Moreau ("Heartbeat"); Ernest Dickerson ("The Music of Mr. Sze"); Tobias Forge ("Premature Burial"); RZA ("Death Tone")
- Written by: Zoe Copper ("Dance, Dance, Dance, Dance"); Flying Lotus ("Gwar Is..." and "Another Cabin"); David Moreau ("Heartbeat"); Ernest Dickerson ("The Music of Mr. Sze"); Tobias Forge ("Premature Burial"); RZA ("Death Tone"); Matt Landsman ("Death Tone")
- Produced by: Roy Lee; Steven Schneider; Josh Goldbloom; Brad Miska; Michael Schreiber
- Cinematography: Kevin P. Stewart ("Dance, Dance, Dance" and "Heartbeat"); Powell Robinson ("Coochie Coochie Coo"); Patrick Murguia ("The Music of Mr. Sze"); Crille Forsberg ("Premature Burial"); Sean McDaniel ("Death Tone")
- Edited by: Tom Newhel ("Dance, Dance, Dance, Dance"); Guillaume Houssais ("Heartbeat"); Thom Newell ("The Music of Mr. Sze"); Emil Klinta ("Premature Burial"); Brad Besser ("Death Tone")
- Music by: Flying Lotus; Tobias Forge; Alex Geringas; Mike Himelstein; Showing Teeth (end credit song, "Hellraiser")
- Production companies: Shudder Original Films; Cinepocalypse; Image Nation Abu Dhabi; Spooky Pictures
- Distributed by: Shudder
- Release dates: September 30, 2026 (Beyond Fest); October 9, 2026 (United States)
- Running time: 98 minutes
- Country: United States
- Language: English

V/H/S/Mixtape is a 2026 American found footage horror anthology film produced by Spooky Pictures. The sequel to V/H/S/Halloween (2025), it is the ninth installment in the V/H/S franchise. It was directed by Renee Zhan, Flying Lotus, David Moreau, Ernest Dickerson, Tobias Forge and RZA.

The film had its world premiere at Beyond Fest on September 30, 2026, and was released by Shudder in the United States on October 9, 2026. A sequel, V/H/S: SCP, is scheduled to release on 2027.

== Plot ==
The film is presented as an anthology of six horror films built into a narrative, which serves as its seventh film. Themed around music and audio, each segment is connected through found footage and music videos, with an animated segment in between.

=== "Gwar Is..." (frame narrative) – Prologue ===
- Written and directed by Flying Lotus

Instead of following a linear story, this framing segment focuses on the band Gwar performing a series of morbid skits.

Grodius Maximus enters his mother's bedroom with a camera to share a discovery: his childhood drawings come to life whenever he masturbates on them, which he demonstrates using a drawing of a hot dog. When he tries doing the same to a picture of himself, a second Grodius appears and is deemed evil. The duplicate then ejaculates on the original Grodius with his giant penis. As Grodius fights back with his own penis, they are interrupted by his mother, who is upset that they did not invite her to masturbate with them, prompting her to shoot herself in the head.

The scene cuts to the band's leader, Blöthar the Berserker, who invites the viewer to witness the horrors they are about to show. The band then inserts a tape into their VCR, transitioning to the first segment.

=== "Dance, Dance, Dance, Dance" ===
- Directed by Renee Zhan
- Written by Zoe Cooper
- Story by Renee Zhan

A clip from The Curious Chorus, an old children's puppet show, is shown. In it, the four main characters, Hemlock, Riptide, Skeeto, and Botulism, choose a child from their audience to sing a song with them about how death comes for everyone.

In the present, Vanessa, an uptight studio executive, arrives at the studio's puppet workshop with her producer, Chris, and her cameraperson and adoptive son, Sam. They are greeted by Daisy, an intern. Vanessa has been ordered by the studio that created the original series to turn the characters into CGI avatars for an animated reboot by digitally scanning the original puppets. This displeases George, the studio's puppeteer, who argues that the show does not need a reboot and refuses to let the puppets be scanned. However, he eventually relents when Vanessa reminds him that he does not own the puppets and threatens to take them by force. As Chris scans the puppets, their generated models appear far more monstrous than the original puppets.

While Chris tries to resolve the problem and Vanessa argues with George, Sam explores a restricted section of the workshop and discovers George's workstation. There, he finds a television playing the footage of The Curious Chorus shown earlier in the segment. The clip reveals that George was the child chosen to sing with the puppets. It then cuts to a bloodied set, where the young George stares at the camera with a smile and an injured shoulder as screams can be heard in the background.

George later tells Sam that the scans are complete. Before the visitors leave, however, he invites them and Daisy to record a promotional video with the original puppets. As everyone puts on a puppet and George begins recording, the puppets start moving on their own and singing their old song before brutally attacking their hosts. They rip off Vanessa's arm, suck Daisy's blood, and vomit acid onto Chris' face. Sam manages to escape the set but finds himself surrounded by dozens of other puppets and animatronics, all of which are animated and hostile. The Curious Chorus eventually captures Sam and slices his skull in half with a table saw, making his corpse resemble a puppet. The puppets then manipulate his severed head into singing their song as the footage ends.

=== "Gwar Is..." – First interlude ===
Maggot, who is inside a cage, puts a cassette tape into a radio and begins a series of gruesome exercise routines. These include using a prisoner's intestines as a jump rope and lifting a severed head with her vagina. Her activities are interrupted when an unseen assailant grabs her.

=== "Another Cabin" ===
- Directed by Flying Lotus

This is the first animated segment in the franchise.

A boy living in a cabin in a dark forest tries to feed his abusive grandmother some soup. When he looks out the window, he spots a giant monster with a long tongue emerging from the woods. The boy tries to save his grandmother from the creature, only for her to attempt to feed him to it instead. Eventually, the boy grows tired of his grandmother's abuse and kicks her away, allowing the monster to tear off and swallow her head.

The monster's face then changes into that of the grandmother as the boy attempts to escape the wrecked cabin. However, he is killed when the creature crushes him with its tongue. As its face transforms into that of the boy, the monster looks into the distance and spots another cabin to attack as the short ends.

=== "Gwar Is..." – Second interlude ===
Beefcake the Mighty and Balsac the Jaws O' Death attempt to repair a broken VHS tape, complaining about how complicated they are. After fixing it, they insert the tape into the VCR, starting the next segment.

=== "Heartbeat" ===
- Written and directed by David Moreau

Wes and Maya, a dating couple who run an urban exploration YouTube channel, gather footage for their latest video. They plan to explore a numbered bunker hidden in the mountains of Bulgaria, with no road leading to it. Their research indicates that the bunker is part of a Soviet military base that has been decommissioned for decades, which is confirmed when they discover an abandoned truck bearing a red star. Upon finding the military base itself, the pair begin exploring and discover Russian writing on the walls before coming across an anechoic chamber designed to block out all external sounds.

The two enter the chamber, which includes a warning sign stating that no one should remain inside for more than 15 minutes. Wes finds a tape recorder that begins playing Russian speech when he activates it. This causes the chamber door to close and lock, trapping them inside. As Wes searches for a way out, he and Maya discover that the sounds naturally produced by their bodies are amplified to ear-splitting volumes by the chamber's properties.

As time passes and he begins to lose his sanity, Wes attempts to puncture his eardrums with a screwdriver. Maya tries to stop him but accidentally drives the screwdriver into his throat, killing him. Shortly afterward, Maya suddenly hears a heartbeat coming from her stomach, revealing that she is pregnant with Wes' child.

Several days after they first became trapped, an increasingly distressed Maya realizes that she has nothing to feed the baby. At her wit's end, she crawls over to Wes' decaying corpse and begins eating him, crying as she does so. The tape recorder is heard playing again, followed by the sound of the chamber door opening as the footage ends.

=== "Gwar Is..." – Third interlude ===
Berserker attempts to order food but forgets his lines and begins complaining that he has not read the script and does not know what happens next. The scene then cuts to black-and-white footage of Balsac eating a dead body. It cuts again to Sawborg Destructo interviewing an entity that claims to be the Horror of the Cosmos. Destructo dismisses its claims, prompting the entity to spit black goo into his face and subject him to a series of hallucinations. The film then cuts to the next segment.

=== "The Music of Mr. Sze" ===
- Written and directed by Ernest Dickerson

This segment is a loose adaptation of H. P. Lovecraft's novella The Music of Erich Zann.

College student Philip Howard films a documentary about his life for a class project, documenting the boarding house he recently moved into. After one of his neighbors threatens him, he begins using video glasses to record footage more discreetly. He starts hearing violin music coming from above his room, which the landlady, Mrs. Blandi, explains belongs to Mr. Sze, a lonely and reclusive musician who has lived in the attic for a long time.

Intrigued by the music and seeing an opportunity for his documentary, Philip asks Mr. Sze if he can record him playing. Although Mr. Sze initially refuses, he changes his mind when Philip promises to preserve his music for future generations. In the attic, Mr. Sze plays for Philip, who enjoys the performance. However, Philip asks him to play the tune he heard the other night. When Philip attempts to repeat it, the house begins to rumble violently. Terrified, Mr. Sze begs Philip never to repeat the music and to relocate to an apartment on the first floor so he will no longer have to listen to it.

In the following days, Philip tries to understand why Mr. Sze is so paranoid about the music while noticing that the musician's hair is becoming longer and whiter. When he sneaks into the attic, he discovers a collection of occult papers and finds a red crystal near the desk. Through his video glasses, the crystal gives Philip an abstract vision revealing that a gigantic eldritch creature was sent to Earth by an alien planet. Mr. Sze uses the tune Philip heard to keep the creature at bay and prevent it from destroying the world.

Mr. Sze catches Philip in the attic just as the creature emerges from beneath a nearby church. The old musician claims that the creature can see him and furiously plays the occult tune in an attempt to lull it back to sleep. However, the creature manages to teleport into the house and kills him. Philip runs for his life as the creature pursues him, killing Mrs. Blandi and the other residents along the way. Although Philip manages to get outside, the creature destroys the house and lunges at him, presumably devouring him as the footage ends.

=== "Gwar Is..." – Fourth interlude ===
Beefcake the Mighty and Jizmak Da Gusha discuss how much they enjoyed the previous segment and express their appreciation for found footage films. They ask Testicles to bring them some footage, but he instead gives them severed feet. Angered by this, they rip his face off. The film then cuts to Berserker, who declares that the sound of human suffering is the most glorious thing in existence.

=== "Premature Burial" ===
- Directed by Tobias Forge

This segment is a music video for the song of the same name by the band Repugnant.

As a woman attends a man's funeral, a series of flashbacks reveals how she previously sneaked up on him and knocked him unconscious with an injection. She then disguised herself as a doctor and declared him dead, staging a fake autopsy to complete the deception. Back at the funeral, she places a sound monitor inside the man's casket. She later hears noises coming from it, revealing that the man has regained consciousness and realized that he has been buried alive.

Another flashback reveals that the woman's actions are part of an elaborate revenge plan against the man, revealed to be either her co-worker or superior at the hospital where she works, after he sexually assaulted her and punched her when she fought back. When the man manages to crawl out of his grave, the woman appears in the cemetery and kicks his head off, killing him for real. She then places his severed head back inside the grave as the video ends.

=== "Gwar Is..." – Epilogue ===
Bonesnapper the Cave Troll rips out a prisoner's guts and eats them. The film abruptly cuts to the final segment.

=== "Death Tone" ===
- Directed by RZA
- Written by RZA and Matt Landsman

Lydia Van Horn, the young daughter of a famous music producer who recently died, struggles to create a musical tribute to her father. While going through his belongings, Lydia discovers a cassette tape he left for her. In the recording, he instructs her to create the ultimate track, a melody that will allow them to be together forever. He also advises her to follow a series of lessons to create the track and document the process as it happens.

Initially, Lydia has no inspiration for the track. However, after taking drugs from her father's old stash, she finds inspiration in his advice about using "fresh, organic sounds" in his music.

For the first lesson, Lydia goes to a bar to meet a man named Tommy. She brings him back to her apartment and ties him to her bed, leading him to believe they are about to engage in sexual activity. However, Lydia uses a remote control to stretch his body until it tears in half, using the compression of his spine as percussion for her track. For the second lesson, Lydia convinces a bar musician named Mark to come to her apartment to record a song, only to bisect him with a chainsaw and use his screams for the track's vocals. In the third lesson, Lydia kidnaps a homeless woman named Alyssa, shoves a camera down her throat, and records the sounds of her being stabbed with a knife to create "ghost notes" for the track.

Police detective Sharpe later appears at Lydia's door and asks whether she has seen any of the missing individuals. Lydia pretends not to know anything and invites Sharpe inside, but he refuses. The fourth lesson is shown through a montage of Lydia killing and torturing several people so that she does not "hide behind the machines". Sharpe visits Lydia again, this time with footage of one of her victims that may implicate her in the case. He asks to search her apartment, but Lydia angrily refuses. For the fifth and final lesson, Lydia is instructed to "put herself into the work", although she initially lacks the courage to do so.

Suddenly, Sharpe returns with a search warrant and enters the apartment, discovering a large amount of bloody evidence proving Lydia's guilt. As he informs her that she is under arrest, Lydia activates her latest death trap, which impales her through the anus and out of her mouth with a drill. While a shaken Sharpe calls the forensic team, Lydia stumbles into the recording booth and publishes the track. As she dies, she tells her father that she has completed the perfect tribute. The camera then mysteriously pans around the booth as Lydia's track plays, followed by a montage of various moments from the segment as the footage ends.

=== "Dance, Dance, Dance, Dance" – Post-credits scene ===
George mops the floor after the massacre, having kept Sam's camera and showing it his "secret place". The vault where the Curious Chorus is kept has been transformed into an altar containing the bloodstained puppets and the bodies of their victims. The film ends with George remarking that he will have to hire another intern.

== Cast ==
=== "Gwar Is..." ===
- Michael Derks as Balsac the Jaws O' Death
- Casey Orr as Beefcake the Mighty
- Michael Bishop as Blöthar the Berserker
- Bob Gorman as Bonesnapper the Cave Troll
- Tommy Meehan as Glodious Maximus
- Brad Roberts as Jizmak Da Gusha
- Matt Maguire as Sawborg Destructo
- Margaret Rolicki as Maggot
- Scott Bryan as Testicles
- Bradley Parmer as Mr. Perfect
- Ryan Parrish as Torture Rack Victim
- Mike Manasewitsch as Frugal Boots

=== "Dance, Dance, Dance, Dance" ===
- Josh Willis as George
- Christopher Romero Rosa Sosa as Sam
- Barbara Crampton as Vanessa
- Erin Griff as Daisy
- Zach Jobe as Chris
- George Goby as young George
- Raymond Carr as Riptide
- Daniel Garza as Botulism
- Amanda Maddock as Hemlock
- Sarah Berman as Skeeto

=== "Heartbeat" ===
- Julie Clergerie as Maya
- Elie Kaempfen as Wes

=== "The Music of Mr. Sze" ===
- Jihad Brent as Philip Howard
- Alex Hsu as Mr. Sze
- Jaki Lauper as Mrs. Blandi
- Michael J. Sielaff as Strange Man
- Mike Ferguson as Scary Guy
- Anatol Rotman as The Horror
- Josh Goldbloom as Handyman Josh

=== "Premature Burial" ===
- Nour El-Refai as The Woman
- Gustaf Hammarstean as The Man

=== "Death Tone" ===
- Neela Jolene as Lydia
- Understanding Diggs as Detective Sharpe
- Grant Holleman as Tommy
- TJ Minor as Mark
- Taylor Danehower as Alyssa
- Omar Mustafa Adem as Chris
- Tony Nunes as Kevin
- Maisie de Krassel as Sarah
- John Malone as Ted

== Development ==
In August 2026, it was announced that a ninth V/H/S film was announced and scheduled to be released on October. The directors involved being the filmmakers Ernest Dickerson, Renee Zhan & David Moreau, rapper RZA, musician Flying Lotus, and Swedish musician Tobias Forge.

== Release ==
V/H/S/Mixtape had its world premiere at Beyond Fest on September 30, 2026, and debuted as an exclusive release on Shudder on October 9, 2026.

== Reception ==
On the review aggregator website Rotten Tomatoes, 48% of 31 critics' reviews are positive, with an average rating of 5.2/10. Metacritic, which uses a weighted average, assigned the film a score of 41 out of 100, based on 7 critics, indicating "mixed or average" reviews.

In a review for RogerEbert.com, critic Brian Tallerico criticized the film, calling the worst of the series since V/H/S: Viral, giving it 1 out 4 stars. In a more mixed review, Leslie Felperin from The Guardian, says that the segment of Renee Zhan "drags on a bit, but has a reasonable gags-to-gore ratio in its tale of murderous puppets taking revenge on visiting studio execs who would dare to "reimagine" some ageing IP best left dormant".

== Sequel ==
In July 2026, it was announced that a tenth film titled V/H/S: SCP, was in development, set to release in 2027.

In September 2026, the film was picked up for distribution by A24.

== See also ==
- List of ghost films
