= Robert X. Golphin =

American actor

- Robert at the 2008 Hollywood premiere of "Remember The Daze"
- Born: Robert X. Golphin; Philadelphia, Pennsylvania
- Occupations: Actor, Filmmaker, Screenwriter, Author, Journalist, Speaker
- Known for: The Great Debaters
- Website: www.RobertXGolphin.com

Robert X. Golphin (born Robert Bennett Xavier Golphin), is an American actor, writer/director, author, speaker and journalist from Philadelphia, Pennsylvania. He is best known for his role as Dunbar Reed in The Great Debaters.

== Education ==
Golphin holds an MFA in screenwriting from the Naslund-Mann Graduate School of Writing at Spalding University, a B.A. in theater and film (magna cum laude) from St. Augustine's University and a diploma in creative writing from the Philadelphia High School for the Creative and Performing Arts.

== Career ==
Golphin's film roles include Remember the Daze, "Rounding First", Punch Me, "The Underground Kings" and "Essential". His television and new media credits include the HBO series The Wire, the HBO miniseries John Adams (2008), and "The Counterparts". Among his theatrical credits are "The Storm: An Original Pop-Rock Musical" (2012), "Englewood Boys: A Play on Portraiture"(2015), and "Bessie Smith: Empress of the Blues" (2019).

In 2020, Golphin made his feature length directorial debut with "Freshman Friday", which was released on Amazon Prime Video. He has also written, produced, and/or directed several award-winning short films that have screened at national and international film festivals. During his final semester of undergraduate studies at St. Augustine's University, he directed and produced an authorized stage medley of Spike Lee's School Daze.

Golphin's journalism background includes a four-year stint as an on-air correspondent for Reelblack TV, and published credits in The Philadelphia Inquirer 'First Take' Newspaper, The Philadelphia Sunday Sun, SCOOP USA Newspaper, The Manning Times, The Campbell Times, and Teen People Magazine among others.

He is also the author of the novellas, "Cold Night In A Warm Season" (2021) and "Abandoning Adam: Confessions of an HBCU Scholar" (2006).

Golphin is the Founder/CEO of Robert X. Golphin Entertainment.

== Filmography ==
=== Acting (Film & TV) ===
Year	Title	Role	Notes
2004	Simply Untitled	Roland	
2004	The Wire	Crackhead (uncredited)	Episode: Back Burners
2005	Rounding First	Quick Mart Clerk	
2005	Track Marks	Markee Percy	
2006–09	Reelblack TV	On Air Correspondent	Various episodes
2007	Remember the Daze	Boy 2	Also known as "The Beautiful Ordinary"
2007	The Great Debaters	Dunbar Reed	
2008	John Adams	Male Slave	Episode: "Join or Die"
2008	Beautiful Man in the Buff	Devaun Cheri	Nominated-Best Actor In A Short, Downbeach Film Festival
2011	Un-Perfect	Douglas Jr.	
2011	Punch Me	Son	Nominated-Best Actor In A Short, Atlantic City CineFest
2014	The Underground Kings	Javier	Pilot Episode
2014	The Counterparts	Series Regular	Web Series
2017	Right Song, Wrong C(h)ord	Jay	
2019	#ThatMoment	Series Regular	Web Series
2019–present	RXG: Exclusives	Host	Web Series
2020	Essential	Shiloh Avery Sr.	Best Actor win and nomination at film festivals
2022	How To Tie A Tie	Darnell	Best Supporting Actor win on the film festival circuit
2023	Exuvia	J.R.	film festivals
2023	The Good of Man	Rodney	film festivals
2025	Chest Candy	Jace A. Collier	film festivals
2025	American Zealot	Moroccan Gang Member	(post-production)

=== Film/TV (Crew) ===
Year	Title	Role	Notes
1997	Stricken: Teens Face Aids	Writer-Producer-Director	Short Film
1999	Lit	Writer-Producer-Director	Short Film
2002	Say Cheese, Elohim	Writer-Producer-Director	Experimental Film
2002	Hack	Production Assistant (Set)	CBS Television/Big Ticket Productions
2004	Simply Untitled	Writer-Producer-Director	Short Film
2004	Acrimony	Director of Photography	Feature/Also known as "Vengeance"
2005	Track Marks	Writer-Producer	Short Film
2005	Private Jet	Writer-Producer-Director	Short Film
2005	Tilted	Writer-Producer-Director	Student Film
2005	White Men Can't Rap	2nd 2nd Assistant Director, Script Supervisor	Feature
2008	Beautiful Man in the Buff	Writer-Producer	Short Film
2009	The Bridge	Writer	Short Film
2009	Insecure	Writer-Producer-Director	Short Film
2009	Simply Untitled (Redux)	Writer-Director-Producer	Short Film
2009	Inside of Me	Writer-Producer-Director	Short Film
2011	Punch Me	Writer-Producer-Director	Short Film
2011	Romeo and His Juliet	Associate Producer, Script Supervisor	Short Film
2011	Un-Perfect	Writer-Producer-Director	Short Film
2012	I Am Man	Writer-Producer-Director	Short Film
2012	"Sabrina" - Calloway	1st Assistant Director	Music Video
2013	Pretentious: Skylar Avielle	Writer/Executive Producer	New Media
2013	African Genesis: The Journey of The Songhai People	Cinematographer	Feature Length Documentary
2014	The Counterparts	Writer, director, Co-Executive Producer	Web Series
2015	Under the Thumb	Writer, Co-Director, Producer	Short
2016-2018	Talking With Janet	Director, executive producer	Talk Show - Hosted by Emmy Award-Winning Journalist Janet Conner-Knox (digital series)
2017	La Douleur Exquise	Consulting Producer	Short
2019	Voice of Majesty	Writer, director, producer	Episodic
2019	The Things We Go Through	Cinematographer	Short
2019	Making Movie Magic	Director, producer	Documentary (short)
2019	Making Movie Magic: Part Deux	Director, producer	Documentary (short)
2019–Present	RXG: Exclusives	Director, executive producer	Talk Show (award-winning digital series)
2019	#ThatMoment	Director, executive producer	Digital Series
2020	Essential	Writer, director, producer	Short
2020	The New Virtual Normal	Writer, producer	Digital Series
2020	Freshman Friday	Director	Feature
2021	Back In The Flesh	Director, producer	Documentary (short)
2022	So Much Happy	Director, producer	Documentary (short)
2023	Still, And In The Moment	Director, Producer	Documentary (short)
2024	Reset: A Reel Journey with First State & RSCT	Director, Producer	Documentary (short)
2025	Synergy: Victor & Snookie	Director, Producer	Digital Docu-series
2025	Cinematic Chaos: An RSCT Film Camp Sneak Peek	Director, Producer	Documentary (short)
2025	Chest Candy	Director, Producer	Short

=== Theatre (Crew) ===
Year	Title	Role	Notes
1999	Sinners 7: Plane Ticket to Heaven	Writer-Producer-Director	Drama Ministry
2000	Sinners 7: Plane Ticket to Heaven	Writer-Producer-Director	Community Theatre
2005	My Breasts, My Hair	Writer-Producer-Director	One Act Play
2006	Spike Lee's School Daze	Director/Producer	An authorized stage medley
2011	Sinners 7: Plane Ticket to Heaven	Writer	Drama Ministry

== Books ==
- Golphin, Robert X. (2021). Cold Night in a Warm Season. Independent. ISBN 9798726551555.
- Golphin, Robert X. (2006). Abandoning Adam: Confessions of an HBCU Scholar. AuthorHouse. ISBN 978-1-4259-6025-4.

== Awards ==
=== Acting ===
Year	Presented by	Award	Category	Role	Result
2008	Downbeach Film Festival	Best Actor	In A Short	"Devaun Cheri" in Beautiful Man in the Buff	Nominated
2011	Atlantic City CineFest	Best Actor	In A Short	"Son" in Punch Me	Nominated
2020	Top Indie Film Awards	Best Actor	In A Short	"Shiloh Avery, Sr." in "Essential"	Nominated
2020	Screen Power Film Festival	Best Actor	In A Short	"Shiloh Avery, Sr." in "Essential"	Won
2021	Foreman Empire Productions International Film Festival	Best Actor		"Shiloh Avery, Sr." in "Essential"	Won
2022	Foreman Empire Productions TV & Movie Awards	Best TV Host		Host of "RXG Exclusives"	Nominated
2022	Foreman Empire Productions TV & Movie Awards	Best Supporting Actor		"Darnell" in "How To Tie A Tie"	Won
2023	East Coast Movie Awards	Best Actor In A Drama		"Shiloh Avery, Sr." in "Essential"	Won

=== Filmmaking ===
Year	Award	Category	Film	Result
1997	AALHOF: African American Legends Hall of Fame	Legends of Tomorrow	Stricken: Teens Face Aids	Won
1998	NAACP: National Association for The Advancement of Colored People	Act-So Competition, Film, 2nd Place	Stricken: Teens Face Aids	Won
1998	BEBASHI: Blacks Educating Blacks About Sexual Health Issues	Ujimaa Award (now the "John Allen Blue Award")	Stricken: Teens Face Aids	Won
1998	Philadelphia Please Touch Museum For Kids	Great Friend To Kids	Stricken: Teens Face Aids, LIT	Won
2003	ABC Entertainment Television Group	New Talent Development Program Finalist ("Recognition of Creative Excellence" Recipient)	A screenplay	(Finalist)
2007	Irene I. Parisi, Set In Philadelphia Screenplay Competition	Best Young Screenwriter	A Feature Length Screenplay	(2nd Place)
2008	Irene I. Parisi, Set In Philadelphia Screenplay Competition	Best Young Screenwriter	A Feature Length Screenplay	(Finalist)
2008	Downbeach Film Festival, New Jersey	Best Short Film	Beautiful Man in the Buff	Nominated
2009	Philafilm: Philadelphia International Film Festival & Marketplace	Best Short Subject	Beautiful Man in the Buff	(Honorable Mention)
2009	Los Angeles Reel Film Festival	Best Narrative Short	Inside of Me	(Honorable Mention)
2009	Indie Short Film Competition	Narrative Short	Inside of Me	(Finalist)
2009	Trail Dance Film Festival	Golden Drover Award for Best Short Drama	Inside of Me	Nominated
2010	The Accolade Competition	Award of Merit-Short Film	Inside of Me	Won
2010	The Accolade Competition	Award of Merit-Direction	Inside of Me	Won
2010	WorldFest-Houston	Remi Bronze Award - Film and Video Productions (Women's Issues)	Inside of Me	Won
2010	Philafilm: Philadelphia International Film Festival & Marketplace	Best "Short Subject - Honorable Mention	Inside of Me	Won
2010	Atlantic City Cinefest (Sponsored by Downbeach Film Festival)	Best Local Short	Inside of Me	Won
2011	Black Maria Film + Video Festival	Jury's Citation - 2nd Prize	Punch Me	Won
2011	Love Unlimited Film Festival and Art Exhibition	Honorable Mention	Punch Me	Won
2011	Philafilm: Philadelphia International Film Festival & Market	Silver Award for Best Short Subject	Punch Me	Won
2011	Los Angeles Reel Film Festival	Best Narrative Short - Honorable Mention	Un-Perfect	Won
2011	FilmOut San Diego	Best of LGBT Shorts	Punch Me	(Special Distinction)
2011	QBC: Queer Black Cinema Festival	Best Narrative Short - Honorable Mention	Punch Me	Won
2011	Atlantic City CineFest	Best Drama, Short	Punch Me	Nominated
2012	Los Angeles Movie Awards	Honorable Mention, Narrative Short	Punch Me	Won
2013	Set In Philadelphia Screenplay Competition	Prime Time Award	Original Teen Drama Television Pilot	(Finalist)
2013	Set In Philadelphia Screenplay Competition	Prime Time Award	Original Television Crime Drama Pilot	(Finalist)
2015	Philafilm: Philadelphia International Film Festival	"Under the Thumb"	Leigh Whipper Gold Award for Best Short Subject	Won
2019	Philafilm: Philadelphia International Film Festival	"Voice of Majesty"	Leigh Whipper Gold Award for Best Short Subject	Won
2020	Top Indie Film Awards	"Essential"	Best Director	Nominated
2020	Top Indie Film Awards	"Essential"	Best Message	Nominated
2020	Flight Deck Film Festival	"Essential"	Best Director	Won
2020	Flight Deck Film Festival	"Voice of Majesty"	Best Filmmaker	Won
2020	Direct Monthly Online Film Festival	"Essential"	Best Film of the Month	Won
2020	UK Seasonal Short Film Festival	"Essential"	Best Film of the Month	(Honorable Mention)
2020	ShortedFilms.com	"Essential"	Short of the Day	Nominated
2025	The People's Film Festival	"Chest Candy"	Best Short Film	(Honorable Mention)
2025	Black Indie Filmmakers Association Houston Film Festival	"Chest Candy"	Short Film	(Honorable Mention)
2025	Newark Independent Film Festival	"Chest Candy"	Spirit Award	Nominated
2025	Newark Independent Film Festival	"Chest Candy"	Committee's Choice Award	Nominated
