= Repugnant =

Swedish death metal band

- Origin: Norsborg, Stockholm, Sweden
- Genres: Death metal, thrash metal
- Years active: 1998–2004; 2010–2011
- Labels: To the Death; Soulseller
- Past members: Mary Goore; DD Sars (Adam Zaars); G. Grotesque; E. Forcas; Sid E. Burns (Johan Wallin); Carlos Sathanas (Gustaf Lindström); Karl Envall; Roy Morbidson (Joonas Ahonen); Tom Bones (Thomas Daun); Chris Piss (Chris Barkensjo)

Repugnant was a Swedish death/thrash band from Stockholm active from 1998 to 2004. The band has been cited as one of the first revivalists of the Swedish death metal movement, along with Kaamos. They recorded their only studio album Epitome of Darkness in 2002, but it was left unreleased when the band broke up in 2004, only being published in 2006. Vocalist and guitarist Mary Goore (real name Tobias Forge) recruited a new lineup of Repugnant to perform at the Hell's Pleasure festival in 2010, as well as several other shows, ending at the Maryland Deathfest in the United States on 29 May 2011. Following the break up of Repugnant, Forge went on to form and front the Swedish rock band Ghost, where he achieved a higher level of success and fame.

When Tobias Forge (Goore) received the 2019 Platinagitarren award from STIM for his musical accomplishments, jury member and journalist Ika Johannesson stated that "Old school death metal has rarely sounded as good as Repugnant." According to Swedish Death Metal author Daniel Ekeroth, Repugnant's "amazingly old school-sounding death metal is something you must hear to believe."

== Discography ==
- Spawn of Pure Malevolence (Demo, 1999)
- Hecatomb (EP, 1999)
- Draped in Cerecloth (Demo, 2001)
- Dunkel Besatthet (Split, 2002)
- Premature Burial (EP, 2004) - in 2026, a music video was made for the song, directed by Tobias Forge and released as part of the film V/H/S/Mixtape.
- Kaamos / Repugnant (Split, 2004)
- Epitome of Darkness (2006)
