= Hell House LLC (film series) =

Stephen Cognetti film series

- Official logo
- Based on: Concept developed by Stephen Cognetti
- Produced by: Joe Bandelli
- Cinematography: Brian C. Harnick; Joe Schufreider; Carlos Garcia de Dios; Josh Layton
- Edited by: Brad Geizler; Jon Shearburn
- Production companies: Cognetti Films; Marylous' Boys
- Distributed by: GoDigital; POV Horror; Premier Digital Services; Terror Films; Exponenta Film; Shudder
- Country: United States
- Language: English

Hell House LLC is an American found-footage horror film series created by Stephen Cognetti. The series consists of five films produced by Joe Bandelli, with various casts and cinematographers for each film. The story of the first three films revolves around the fictitious and abandoned haunted house attraction Hell House LLC, originally known as the Abaddon Hotel. The series details the backstory of the hotel's history along with Hell House LLC's staff.

== Films ==
Overview of Hell House LLC films
Film	U.S. release date	Director(s)	Writer(s)		Producers
Film	U.S. release date	Director(s)	Screenplay by	Story by	Producers
Hell House LLC	October 16, 2015	Stephen Cognetti	Stephen Cognetti	Stephen Cognetti	Joe Bandelli
Hell House LLC II: The Abaddon Hotel	September 20, 2018	Stephen Cognetti	Stephen Cognetti	Stephen Cognetti	Joe Bandelli
Hell House LLC III: Lake of Fire	September 19, 2019	Stephen Cognetti	Stephen Cognetti	Stephen Cognetti	Joe Bandelli
Hell House LLC Origins: The Carmichael Manor	October 30, 2023	Stephen Cognetti	Stephen Cognetti	Stephen Cognetti	Joe Bandelli
Hell House LLC: Lineage	August 20, 2025	Stephen Cognetti	Stephen Cognetti	Stephen Cognetti	Joe Bandelli

=== Hell House LLC (2015) ===
The film, shot as a documentary, follows a group of Halloween haunted house creators as they prepare for the 2009 opening of their popular haunted attraction, Hell House. Tragedy strikes on opening night when an unknown "malfunction" causes the death of 15 tour-goers and staff. The film reveals the lead-up to the tragedy and what really went wrong that night, the details of which have remained a mystery to the public. It was released on a number of video on-demand platforms, including Amazon Video, Shudder, YouTube, Vudu, and iTunes, on November 1, 2016.

=== Hell House LLC II: The Abaddon Hotel (2018) ===
Hell House LLC II: The Abaddon Hotel was released on Shudder on September 20, 2018. The plot centers around a group of journalists who have gathered to explore the Abaddon Hotel, which has once again been abandoned following the events of the prior film. The film further fleshes out the character of Andrew Tully, a character introduced in the first film, and his goal of opening a gate to hell. None of the journalists leave the abandoned hotel alive. The sole survivor found by the police is revealed to have been dead all along and sent out to intrigue people into visiting the hotel. Bloody Disgusting reviewed the film, criticizing it as a "well-intentioned misstep".

=== Hell House LLC III: Lake of Fire (2019) ===
Hell House LLC III: Lake of Fire was released as a Shudder exclusive on September 19, 2019. It is the third installment of the series. The film is styled as a documentary following Russell Wynn, a wealthy and mysterious entrepreneur who wants the Abaddon Hotel to serve as the location for an immersive theater experience called "Insomnia" based on Faust.

=== Hell House LLC Origins: The Carmichael Manor (2023) ===
The film serves as both a sequel and a prequel to Hell House LLC (2015) and is the fourth installment in the Hell House LLC franchise. It stars Bridget Rose Perrotta, Destiny Leilani Brown, James Liddell, Gideon Berger.

=== Hell House LLC: Lineage (2025) ===
The film is the fifth installment in the Hell House LLC franchise, written and directed by Stephen Cognetti.

In July 2024, Hell House LLC: Lineage was announced with a teaser trailer. Filming began on October 29, 2024, and was released in theaters in August 2025, followed by exclusively streaming through Shudder in October of the same year.

Cognetti has stated that the film is possibly set to be the final installment of the series.

== Main cast and characters ==
List indicators

This section includes characters who have appeared in the film poster's billing block or more than one film in the series.

- An empty grey cell indicates the character was not in the film.
- ^{U} indicates an uncredited appearance.

Character	Hell House LLC	Hell House LLC II: The Abaddon Hotel	Hell House LLC III: Lake of Fire	Hell House LLC Origins: The Carmichael Manor	Hell House LLC: Lineage
Character	2015	2018	2019	2023	2025
Hell House LLC Clown	Joe Bandelli	Joe Bandelli	Joe Bandelli	Joe Bandelli	Joe Bandelli
Sarah Havel	Ryan Jennifer Jones	Ryan Jennifer Jones	Ryan Jennifer Jones		
Alex Taylor	Danny Bellini	Danny Bellini	Danny Bellini		
Andrew “Mac” McNamara	Adam Schneider	Adam Schneider	Adam Schneider		
Diane Graves	Alice Bahlke	Alice Bahlke			
Melissa	Lauren A Kennedy	Lauren A Kennedy			
Paul O'Keefe	Gore Abrams		Gore Abrams		
Tony Prescott	Jared Hacker		Jared Hacker		
Robert Lyons	Theodore Bouloukos		Theodore Bouloukos		
Mitchell Cavanaugh	Matt DePaola^{U}	Vas Eli			Corey Kelly
Jessica Fox		Jillian Geurts	Jillian Geurts		
Molly Reynolds		Joy Shatz	Joy Shatz		
Andrew Tully		Brian David Tracy	Brian David Tracy	Mentioned	Mentioned
Russell Wynn			Gabriel Chytry		
Vanessa Shepherd			Elizabeth Vermilyea		Elizabeth Vermilyea
Jeff Stone			Sam Kazzi		
Margot Bentley				Bridget Rose Perrotta	Bridget Rose Perrotta
Rebecca Vickers				Destiny Brown	Destiny Brown
Chase Bentley				James Liddell	Mentioned
Alicia Cavalini				Searra Sawka	Searra Sawka
Catherine Carmichael				Cayla Berejikian	Cayla Berejikian Deirdre Koczur^{P}
Margaret Carmichael				Victoria Andrunik	Victoria Andrunik
Patrick Carmichael				Gideon Berger	Gideon Berger
Eleanor Carmichael				Marlene Williams^{P}	Marlene Williams
Arthur Carmichael				Robert Savakinus^{U}	Robert Savakinus
Father David Flannery					Mike Sutton
Donald Freddy Perkins					Michael Caprioli
Troy Hopewell					Kenneth Andrew
Tom Haskins					Matthew Dalton Lynch
Bobby Hopewell					Bo Bogle

== Crew and details ==
Title	Crew and details				
Title	Editor(s)	Cinematographer	Production companies	Distributing companies	Running time
Hell House LLC	–	Brian C. Harnick	Cognetti Films, Marylous' Boys	Terror Films, Shudder	1hr 33 mins
Hell House LLC II: The Abaddon Hotel	Jon Shearburn	Joe Schufreider	Cognetti Films, Marylous' Boys	Terror Films, Shudder	1hr 29 mins
Hell House LLC III: Lake of Fire	Brad Geizler, Jon Shearburn	Carlos Garcia de Dios	Cognetti Films, Marylous' Boys	Terror Films, Shudder	1hr 25 mins
Hell House LLC Origins: The Carmichael Manor	–	Josh Layton	Cognetti Films, Marylous' Boys	Terror Films, Shudder	1hr 38 mins
Hell House LLC: Lineage	–	Brian Keenan	Cognetti Films	Terror Films, Shudder	1hr 48 mins

== Reception ==
=== Critical and public response ===
Film	Rotten Tomatoes	Metacritic
Hell House LLC	75% (12 reviews)	–
Hell House LLC II: The Abaddon Hotel	–	–
Hell House LLC III: Lake of Fire	13% (8 reviews)	–
Hell House LLC Origins: The Carmichael Manor	83% (18 reviews)	–
Hell House LLC: Lineage	25% (24 reviews)	–
