= Hell House LLC: Lineage =

2025 film by Stephen Cognetti

- Theatrical release poster
- Directed by: Stephen Cognetti
- Screenplay by: Stephen Cognetti
- Based on: Characters by Stephen Cognetti
- Produced by: Joe Bandelli
- Starring: Elizabeth Vermilyea; Searra Sawka; Mike Sutton
- Cinematography: Brian Keenan
- Production companies: Cognetti Films; Shudder
- Distributed by: Terror Films; Iconic Events
- Release date: August 20, 2025
- Running time: 108 minutes
- Country: United States
- Language: English
- Box office: $650,656

Hell House LLC: Lineage is a 2025 American horror film written and directed by Stephen Cognetti. It serves as the fifth and final installment in the Hell House LLC franchise. Produced by Joe Bandelli, it stars Elizabeth Vermilyea, Searra Sawka, and Mike Sutton.

Hell House LLC: Lineage received a theatrical release in the United States on August 20, 2025, before being released on the streaming service Shudder on October 30, 2025. The film grossed $650,656 globally. It received negative reviews from critics, primarily directed toward its writing, with some deeming it an unsatisfying conclusion to the series.

== Plot ==
In 1989, the Carmichael family continue to grieve the loss of Margaret Carmichael, who died in a car accident. Patrick swears revenge on those who caused her death. 4 years later, a man named Troy Hopewell is attacked and killed by a figure wearing a clown costume.

In the present day, Vanessa, a former TV personality who documented Russell Wynn's production of Insomnia at the Abaddon Hotel, (Note: As depicted in Hell House LLC III: Lake of Fire (2019)) now owns a local bar. As a result of Andrew Tully's attack on the hotel, she has PTSD and visions of a dilapidated house. Her psychiatrist, Dr. Farrel, informs her that other individuals have experienced similar symptoms following the death of three investigators at Carmichael Manor. (Note: As depicted in Hell House LLC Origins: The Carmichael Manor (2023)) While leaving therapy, Vanessa encounters Bobby, a former employee and son of Troy Hopewell. Dr. Farrel informs Vanessa that Bobby was killed, having been murdered by the same clown who killed his father.

Vanessa later comes into contact with Alicia, a true crime author who had been working with Bobby. The two discover that Troy Hopewell and four of his friends were responsible for Margaret's car crash. Over several years, they, along with several of their family members, have all gone missing or died under unusual circumstances, with a red ball present at their final locations. Vanessa questions how she has become involved, as her only connection to Margaret's death is through her estranged husband. Vanessa wakes from a nightmare to find a red ball in her room.

Alicia approaches Father David about exorcizing Carmichael Manor. Aware that she may not survive, Alicia gives Vanessa a copy of her research on Abaddon and Andrew Tully. She and Father David meet the home's caretaker, Donald, to begin the exorcism. They are unable to exorcise the home and perish. Meanwhile, Vanessa has another dream about the home and realizes it is Tully's former house. Vanessa has another vision and learns that Donald is an associate of Tully, and the two influenced Patrick to help them build the Abaddon Hotel and start a cult, hoping to unlock immortality. Donald reveals to Vanessa that she is one of two children born to a woman whom Tully impregnated. Vanessa returns to reality, where she has been chasing a man she saw outside Carmichael Manor. She recognizes him as her twin brother, Mitchell, whom she had previously thought dead.

== Cast ==
- Elizabeth Vermilyea as Vanessa Shepherd
- Searra Sawka as Alicia Cavalini
- Mike Sutton as Father David Flannery
- Joe Bandelli as The Clowns
- Cayla Berejikian as Catherine Carmichael
- Victoria Andrunik as Margaret Carmichael
- Gideon Berger as Patrick Carmichael
- Bridget Rose Perrotta as Margot Bentley
- Destiny Leilani Brown as Rebecca Vickers
- Nicholas Stoesser as Max
- Emily Fan as Crystal
- Michael Caprioli as Donald/Freddy Perkins
- Felicia Curry as Doctor Farrell
- Kenneth Andrew as Troy Hopewell
- Matthew Dalton Lynch as Tom Haskins
- Bo Bogle as Bobby Hopewell
- Marlene Williams as Eleanor Carmichael
- Robert Savakinus as Arthur Carmichael
- Corey Kelly as Mitchell Cavanaugh
- Deirdre Koczur as Possessed Catherine Carmichael

== Production ==
In July 2024, a fifth installment titled Hell House LLC: Lineage was announced with a teaser trailer. Filming began on October 29, 2024. In an interview, Cognetti said that the film is a non-found footage film unlike to its predecessor. He said:

Yes, non-found footage, and I think it will be the scariest of them all.

He also added that the best way to experience the final chapter is to watch it in theaters.

=== Marketing ===
On June 3, 2025, another teaser trailer was released and revealing the returning characters from other installment in the franchise including the Carmichael siblings from Hell House LLC Origins: The Carmichael Manor as well as Elizabeth Vermilyea as Vanessa Shephard who was resurrected in Hell House LLC III: Lake of Fire.

== Release ==
The film was released theatrically in the United States in August 20, 2025, before releasing on Shudder in October 30, 2025.

== Reception ==
=== Box office ===
The film has a limited release to North America on August 20, 2025 and on Russia (CIS) on October 2, 2025. It also have a wide release to Australia and New Zealand on November 1, 2025, and earned $310,031 domestically and $340,625 in international box office.

=== Critical response ===
On the review aggregator website Rotten Tomatoes, 25% of 24 critics' reviews are positive.

Brian Tallerico of RogerEbert.com gave the film a rating of 1.5/4, saying, "The overwritten plotting drags down any attempt to care about what’s happening or to get lost in the terror."

Meagan Navarro of Bloody Disgusting rated the film 1.5 out of 5. "That it’s not scary at all means that there’s nothing to grab hold of for anyone except maybe the franchise’s most devoted fans."

Matt Donato of Daily Dead gave the film a rating of 2/5, and wrote that, "Lineage does the opposite of going out with a bang, instead opting to leave every door wide open—without the accompanying intrigue to explore further."

== Future ==
Stephen Cognetti said in a chat with Variety that there's a future story in the film he also said that making those films is impossible for where he is right now.
