= The Benefactor (2015 film) =

- Theatrical release poster
- Directed by: Andrew Renzi
- Written by: Andrew Renzi
- Produced by: Jason Michael Berman; Thomas B. Fore; Jay Schuminsky; Kevin Turen
- Starring: Richard Gere; Dakota Fanning; Theo James; Clarke Peters; Brian Anthony Wilson; Dylan Baker; Cheryl Hines; Tibor Feldman
- Cinematography: Joe Anderson
- Edited by: Dean C. Marcial; Matthew Rundell
- Music by: Danny Bensi; Saunder Jurriaans
- Production companies: Audax Films; Big Shoes Media; Magnolia Entertainment; Soaring Flight Productions; TideRock Media; Treehouse Pictures
- Distributed by: Samuel Goldwyn Films
- Release dates: April 17, 2015 (Tribeca Film Festival); January 15, 2016 (United States)
- Running time: 93 minutes
- Country: United States
- Language: English
- Box office: $2.1 million

The Benefactor (originally titled Franny) is a 2015 American drama film written and directed by Andrew Renzi. Starring Richard Gere, Dakota Fanning, Theo James, and Clarke Peters, the film premiered at the Tribeca Film Festival on April 17, 2015. It was released in the United States on January 15, 2016, in a limited release and through video on demand by Samuel Goldwyn Films.

== Synopsis ==
A wealthy man (Richard Gere) feels responsible for the deaths of two married friends, leading him to ingratiate himself into the lives of their daughter (Dakota Fanning) and her husband (Theo James). But their friendship takes a dark turn when he grows obsessed with the couple.

== Cast ==
- Richard Gere as Francis "Franny" Watts
- Dakota Fanning as Olivia
- Theo James as Luke
- Clarke Peters as Dr. Romano
- Brian Anthony Wilson as Jesse
- Dylan Baker as Bobby
- Cheryl Hines as Mia
- Dennisha Pratt as Sharon
- Lyssa Roberts as Molly
- Roy James Wilson as Charlie
- Tibor Feldman as Dr. Sam
- Matthew and Michael Daisher as Toby

== Production ==
Andrew Renzi developed the script at the 2013 Sundance Screenwriters Lab. In August 2013, it was announced that it would be produced by Treehouse Pictures, TideRock Media, and Big Shoes Media, with Richard Gere cast to portray the role of Franny, and Andrew Renzi directing. Treehouse Pictures had produced Gere's 2012 film Arbitrage.

In September 2013, it was announced that Dakota Fanning and Theo James had joined, portraying the roles of Olivia and Luke respectively.

Principal photography began on October 21, 2013, in Philadelphia.

== Release ==
The Benefactor premiered at the Tribeca Film Festival on April 17, 2015. On May 1, 2015, Samuel Goldwyn Films acquired American distribution rights. It went onto screen at the Champs-Élysées Film Festival on June 13, 2015. The film was released in Italy on December 23, 2015, under its original name Franny. It was released in the United States on January 15, 2016, in a limited release and through video on demand.

=== Critical reception ===
The film received negative reviews from critics. On Rotten Tomatoes it achieves a score of 26%, an average rating of 4.2/10, sampled from 54 reviews. The consensus states: "The Benefactor has Richard Gere and Dakota Fanning, but no clear idea of what to do with either of them, resulting in a drama that never comes anywhere near its intriguing potential." Metacritic, gives a rating of 39 out of 100, based on 16 reviews, indicating "generally unfavorable reviews".
