= Punch Me =

- Official One-Sheet
- Directed by: Robert X. Golphin
- Written by: Robert X. Golphin
- Produced by: Gail Y. Bennett; Lori M. Childress; Michael J. Panichelli, Jr. Elwood Idris Simon
- Starring: Robert X. Golphin; Brian Anthony Wilson; Elwood Idris Simon
- Cinematography: Steve Laramie
- Edited by: Christopher J. Montero
- Release date: February 20, 2011
- Country: United States
- Language: English

Punch Me is a 2011 short drama film about a young man who must embrace his identity or risk losing the two people he loves most. The film explores themes of identity, acceptance, and health awareness. It stars Robert X. Golphin and Brian Anthony Wilson. The film screened at several film festivals between 2010 and 2012.

== Cast ==
- Robert X. Golphin as Son
- Brian Anthony Wilson as Father
- Elwood Idris Simon as Boyfriend

== Awards ==
Year	Festival	Award	Category	Result
2012	Los Angeles Movie Awards	Honorable Mention	Narrative Short	Won
2011	Philafilm: Philadelphia International Film Festival & Market	Silver Award	Best Short Subject	Won
2011	Black Maria Film + Video Festival & Tour	Jury's Citation	2nd Prize	Won
2011	Love Unlimited Film Festival and Art Exhibition	Award	Honorable Mention	Won
2011	QBC: Queer Black Cinema	Award	Honorable Mention	Won
2011	Atlantic City CineFest	Best Drama, Short	(15 Minutes or Less)	Nominated
2011	Atlantic City CineFest	Best Actor (Robert X. Golphin)	In A Short	Nominated
2011	FilmOut San Diego	No Award; Special Distinction	Best of LGBT Shorts	—N/a

== Festival releases ==
Year	Festival	Location
2011	Marlon Riggs Film Festival	Dallas, Texas
2011	Atlantic City CineFest	Atlantic City, New Jersey
2011	Pink Sheep Film Festival	Wilmington, North Carolina
2011	St. Louis Black Pride	St. Louis, Missouri
2011	Edgemar Short Film Festival	Los Angeles, California
2011	Philafilm: Philadelphia International Film Festival & Market	Philadelphia, Pennsylvania
2011	Black Hollywood Education and Resource Center's 18th Annual African-American Film Marketplace and S.E. Manly Short Film Showcase	Los Angeles, California
2011	Black Maria Film + Video Festival And Tour	TBA Locations
2011	QBC (Queer Black Cinema) Film Festival	Brooklyn, New York
2011	Triangle Black Pride Expo & Film Festival	Raleigh, North Carolina
2011	Philadelphia QFest	Philadelphia, Pennsylvania
2011	NC Black Film Festival	Wilmington, North Carolina
2011	Love Unlimited Film Festival and Art Exhibition	Venice Beach, California
2011	Riverside International Film Festival	Riverside, California
2011	Louisville LGBT Film Festival	Louisville, Kentucky
2011	Bebashi: Transition To Hope	Philadelphia, Pennsylvania
2011	Nashville Black Pride LGBT Film and Cultural Fest	Nashville, Tennessee
2011	Philadelphia Black Gay Pride Midnight Movie Madness	Philadelphia, Pennsylvania
2011	FilmOut San Diego	San Diego, California
2011	SF2: SAG Foundation's Short Film Showcase	New York, NY
2011	Sizzle Miami	Miami, Florida
2010	Reelblack Presents (Sneak Preview)	Philadelphia, Pennsylvania
2010	Attic Youth Center (Sneak Preview)	Philadelphia, Pennsylvania
