= Michael Sutton (actor) =

American actor

- Born: Michael Sutton; June 18 1971 Age 55; Los Angeles, California, U.S.
- Education: Beverly Hills High School
- Alma mater: California State University, Northridge (BA)
- Occupation: Actor
- Years active: 1993–present

Michael Sutton is an American actor.

== Background ==
Sutton was born in Los Angeles, California the son of Joseph Sutton, publicist, manager & author. He graduated from Beverly Hills High School. He has a bachelor's degree in Film Production from Cal State University Northridge 1992. He was the president of Production Ardustry Entertainment in 2005 and a founding member of the Next Generation Council for the Motion Picture & Television Fund from 2003 to the present.

Sutton is best known for playing the HIV-positive teenager and AIDS victim Stone Cates on the daytime serial General Hospital. He was nominated for a Daytime Emmy Award for Outstanding Supporting Actor in a Drama Series in 1996 for that role. It was announced that he would return to General Hospital for two episodes in 2010 and again in August 2017.

== Filmography ==
Year	Film	Role	Notes
1993–1995, 2010, 2017	General Hospital	Michael "Stone" Cates	Nominated-Young Artist Award for Best Performance by a Youth Actor in a Daytime Series (1995); Nominated-Emmy for Outstanding Supporting Actor in a Drama Series (1996)
1997	Inventing the Abbotts	Steve	
1998	Error in Judgement	James	
1999	Dark Nova	Zed	
1999	Wanted	Jimmy Scrico	
1999	American Intellectuals		
2000	Dark Prince: The True Story of Dracula	Radu	
2002	Hyper Sonic	Kevin Irvine	
2002	Against All Evidence	Ben	
2025	825 Forest Road	Thomas	
2026	The Façade of Sunshine	Frank Croswell	
