= Brian Anthony Wilson =

American actor

- Born: February 22, 1960 (age 66); Philadelphia, Pennsylvania, U.S.
- Occupation: Actor
- Years active: 1997–present
- Spouse: Greer M. Richardson (m. 2005)

Brian Anthony Wilson (born February 22, 1960) is an American film and television actor. He first appeared in the 1997 film The Postman as Woody. Wilson was born in Philadelphia, Pennsylvania and is of African American heritage. He has been married to Greer M. Richardson since 2005.

== Filmography ==
=== Film ===
Year	Title	Role	Notes
1997	The Postman	Woody	
1998	Snake Eyes	Casino Security #2	
1998	Rounders	Derald	
1999	Cold Hearts	Spear	
2000	Animal Factory	Poncie	
2000	Keeping the Faith	T-Bone	
2000	Let's Talk	Audience Member #14	
2001	Diary of a City Priest	Loc	
2001	Prison Song	Prison C.O.	
2001	Down	Policeman #1	
2001	Killer Instinct	Carl	
2002	Crazy Little Thing	Phil	
2002	For da Love of Money	Kelvin	
2002	Ice Grill	Damon J	
2002	Casanova's Demise	Judge	
2003	The Good Thief	Louis	
2003	Bad Boys II	Tapia Muscle Crew	Uncredited
2003	Dirty Laundry (Air It Out)	Jerome	
2004	X, Y	Cox	
2004	The Amazing Floydini	Willy	
2005	White Men Can't Rap	Buck	
2006	The Good Student	Detective Dick Moon	
2006	Shadow: Dead Riot	Male Guard	
2007	Eye See Me	KC's Attorney	
2007	A Diamond in the Sky	Coach Michael Bailey	
2008	Leaf	Mr. Joel	
2008	Explicit Ills	Demetri's Dad	
2008	The Happening	Arguing Man in Crowd	
2009	Oral Fixation	Guard Jones	
2009	Law Abiding Citizen	Homeland Security Supervisor	
2009	The Mind	Big Daddy	
2009	After You're Gone	Morgenthau	
2010	6 Souls	Virgil	
2010	See You in September	Cop	
2010	The Best and the Brightest	Shareef	Uncredited
2010	The Bucks County Massacre	Bucks County Police Detective	
2011	Another Happy Day	Jason - EMT#1	
2011	Limitless	Detective	
2011	Close-Up	The NA Mentor	
2011	The Fields	Charlie	
2011	The Red Corvette	Agent Murray	
2011	Punch Me	Father	
2011	99 Percent Sure	Rufus	
2011	High Stakes	Trainer	
2011	Booted	Frank Castilleano	
2011	Bamboo Shark	Johnny X	
2012	Safe	Shelter Security 2	
2012	Changing the Game	McCormick	
2012	6 Degrees of Hell	Officer Hendricks	
2012	Silver Linings Playbook	Orderly	Uncredited
2012	We Made This Movie	Mr. James	
2012	9-Ball	Red	
2012	My Friends	Bookie Bob	
2013	The Golden Scallop	Wilson	
2013	All Around the World: Jermaine Jones	Music Executive #1	
2013	Dreams	Ben Hodda	
2014	Assumption of Risk	Thurgood Mitchell	
2014	Apocalypse Kiss	The Wizard	
2014	Myra's Angel	Detective Dutton	
2014	Jersey Justice	Jules	
2014	Time	Rick	
2015	ZK: Elephant's Graveyard	Doc	
2015	The Benefactor	Jesse	
2015	Swooped	The Narrator	
2015	A Place in Hell	Det. Wilson	
2015	Creed	James	
2015	Voiceless	Will Taylor	
2015	Battle	Tony Formann	
2016	Crooked & Narrow	Warren Mercer	
2016	Medicine Bow	Odell	
2016	Between the Devil and the Deep Blue Sea	Kelly	
2017	Title VII	Charles Watson	
2017	The Avenue	Antonio Butan	
2017	How to Get Girls	Mr. Diaz	
2017	Harvie and the Magic Museum	Grumpy	Voice
2017	Sinner City	Detective Parsons	
2017	The Mint	Russell	
2017	Jason's Letter	Mr. Willie	
2018	They Are Strangers	Terry	
2018	Ocean's 8	American Wing Guard	
2018	Zeroes	Fred	
2018	Without You	Mr. Davies	
2018	The Unholy Disciple	Houston Fox	
2019	Glass	Security Guard in Car	
2019	Offstage Elements	Ozzie Dietrick	
2019	Right Before Your Eyes	Ambrose	
2020	The Arrangement	Senator Milton Howard	
2020	The Jealous Mirror on My Wall	Larry	
2020	Mirror on My Wall	Larry	
2021	Love You Right: An R&B Musical	Will II	
2021	Room 9	Zion Miller	
2021	Shimmer	Captain Peter Rose	
2021	Twenty-Nine	Steven Anders	
2022	Nork	Jonah Ryan	
2022	Mulatto	Big Ron	
2022	Desert Dick	Bryan Dilkins	
2024	They Turned Us Into Killers	Zion Miller	
2025	825 Forest Road	Terrence	
TBA	Abused Again!	Big John Security Guard	

=== Television ===
Year	Title	Role	Notes
1999	Homicide: Life on the Street	Diener #1	Episode: "Identity Crisis"
2001	The Sopranos	Warren Dupree	Episode: "Fortunate Son"
2001	Proximity	Twin's father	Television film
2002	Hack	Raymond Henley	Episode: "Bad Choices"
2002–2008	The Wire	Vernon Holley	19 episodes
2003	As the World Turns	Crater	Episode #1.12162
2007, 2008	Law & Order: SVU	Det. Jawarski / Milton Sarlove	2 episodes
2009	Bleeder	Detective Gardner	2 episodes
2010	Outlaw	Pit Boss	Episode: "Pilot"
2010	Badges	Sarge	Television film
2011	Onion SportsDome	Pile Analyst #4	Episode #1.3
2011	Finders Keepers	Det. Grimes	Episode: "Thanks for Nothin' Grimes"
2011	Game Over	Doctor Watson	Episode: "Launch Party"
2011	Unforgettable	Bert	Episode: "Road Block"
2013	Do No Harm	Watts Sr.	Episode: "Six Feet Deep"
2013–2014	Atlantic City Chronicles	D.A. Garfield Armstrong	4 episodes
2014	Underground Kings	Ricardo 'Cuban' Martinez	4 episodes
2015	Broad City	Detective	Episode: "Mochalatta Chills"
2015	Allegiance	Maintenance Man	Episode: "Chasing Ghosts"
2016	Blue Bloods	Dino Mancini	Episode: "Back in the Day"
2016	Sell Out	Rick	Television film
2016	The Jim Gaffigan Show	Nick	Episode: "Ugly"
2017	Gotham	Harbor Master	Episode: "Heroes Rise: These Delicate and Dark Obsessions"
2017	Bloodline	Agent Kimball	Episode: "Part 33"
2018	Bull	Controller #3	Episode: "Keep Your Friends Close"
2018	Siren	Capt. Sean McClure	3 episodes
2018	Stages	Mayor Chad Warwick III	Miniseries
2018	Dietland	Bob the Builder	Episode: "Pilot"
2018	Cicatrix	Detective	Television film
2018	Land of Misfits	Sariel	Television film
2018	Green Piece	Detective B. Johnson	Television film
2019, 2021	Wu-Tang: An American Saga	Ron 'Fufu' Mott	2 episodes
2020	Dispatches from Elsewhere	Sal (Young) / Mr. Salazar	2 episodes
2020	Fluff	Cosmo	Television film
2021	FBI: Most Wanted	James Martin	Episode: "Anonymous"
2021	Mare of Easttown	Medic	Episode: "Poor Sisyphus"
2021	Phase 6	Charles Williams	4 episodes
2022	Servant	Exterminator	Episode: "Hive"
2022	American Masters	Orpheus Fisher	Episode: "Marian Anderson: The Whole World in Her Hands"
2022	We Own This City	Andre Davis	Episode: "Part Five"
2022	Interview with the Vampire	Andre Davis	Episode: "The Ruthless Pursuit of Blood with All a Child's Demanding"
2025	Tires	Customer #2	Episode: "Misery Has Company"

=== Narrative podcasts ===
Year	Title	Role	Notes	Ref(s)
2023	The Foxes of Hydesville	Father		
