= Stephen Cognetti =

American filmmaker

- Born: Pennsylvania
- Education: Temple University
- Occupations: Director; writer
- Years active: 2009–present
- Known for: Hell House LLC; Hell House LLC Origins: The Carmichael Manor; 825 Forest Road

Stephen Cognetti is an American director and writer known for the Hell House LLC franchise of found footage films.

== Early life ==
Cognetti was born in Scranton, Pennsylvania, and raised in Pennsylvania. He attended Temple University, where he studied film.

== Career ==
He released the first Hell House LLC film in 2015 with the intention of making a trilogy of movies, as he saw the initial three films as a single story split into three parts. Cognetti would later expand the original story with a fourth film that served as both a sequel and prequel, Hell House LLC Origins: The Carmichael Manor, in 2023. In 2025, Cognetti released his first non-found footage film, 825 Forest Road. A fifth and final entry in the series, Hell House LLC: Lineage, was released in 2025.

== Filmography ==
=== Films ===
Year	Title	Director	Writer/Screenplay	Producer
2015	Hell House LLC	Yes	Yes	No
2018	Hell House LLC II: The Abaddon Hotel	Yes	Yes	No
2019	Hell House LLC III: Lake of Fire	Yes	Yes	No
2023	Hell House LLC Origins: The Carmichael Manor	Yes	Yes	No
2025	825 Forest Road	Yes	Yes	No
2025	Hell House LLC: Lineage	Yes	Yes	No
2027	A Body in the Woods	Yes	Yes	No

=== Short films ===
Year	Title	Director	Writer/Screenplay	Producer
2009	Caravia Nights			
2009	Bernie Waldoff Investment Securities IOU Capital			
2011	Thomas Jefferson Lives			
