= The Demon Disorder =

2024 film by Steven Boyle

- Official poster
- Directed by: Steven Boyle
- Written by: Steven Boyle; Toby Osborne
- Produced by: Steven Boyle; Kyle Lema; Ari Harrison
- Starring: Charles Cottier; John Noble; Dirk Hunter; Amy Ingram
- Cinematography: Terry King
- Edited by: Danielle Culleton
- Music by: Peter Spierig
- Production company: Formation Pictures
- Distributed by: Provzglyad; Umbrella Entertainment; Shudder
- Release date: 15 August 2024
- Running time: 86 minutes
- Country: Australia
- Language: English
- Box office: $1,438

The Demon Disorder is a 2024 Australian supernatural horror film directed by Steven Boyle and written by Toby Osborne and Steven Boyle. The film stars Christian Willis, Charles Cottier, John Noble, and Amy Ingram. It explores themes of possession, psychological terror, and the battle between good and evil. The film had limited release in Australian cinemas on 15 August 2024, and premiered on American streaming service Shudder on 6 September 2024.

== Plot ==
Graham Reilly, a man who has retreated from life, lives in isolation in his garage workshop, having withdrawn from the world following the death of his father and his estrangement from his two brothers, Jake Reilly and Phillip Reilly. One day, his brother Jake unexpectedly contacts him and says he believes their younger brother, Phillip, is possessed by the spirit of their deceased father, George. It seems that George, now an evil spirit, is trying to seek revenge for his unnatural death.

== Cast ==
- Christian Willis as Graham Reilly
- Charles Cottier as Phillip Reilly
- Dirk Hunter as Jake Reilly
- John Noble as George Reilly
- Amy Ingram as Officer Peters
- Michael Tuahine as Officer Terry
- Liam Wallace as Young Graham
- Tobie Webster as Cole Nichols

== Production ==
=== Development ===
In March 2023, it was announced that Steven Boyle had begun filming his new movie under the banner of Boyle’s Formation, with Charles Cottier playing Phillip Reilly, Dirk Hunter playing Jake Reilly, and Christian Willis playing Graham Reilly. The primary filming took place in the rural community of Gleneagle, west of the Gold Coast, Queensland, throughout April 2023.

The film is directed by Steven Boyle, who is known for his work in independent horror and Star Wars: Episode II - Attack of the Clones, and produced by Kyle Lema. Executive Producers are Ally Muller, Michael, and Peter Spierig. Toby Osborne wrote the script in collaboration with Boyle. Boyle said about the film that it "combines elements of early David Cronenberg and body horror crafted through elaborate visual effects sequences".

=== Filming and visual effects ===
The film's production emphasises practical effects and atmosphere over CGI. Cinematography is led by Terry King, and Amanda Grillini is production designer on the film. Umbrella Entertainment is the distributor for Australia.

== Release ==
Umbrella Entertainment acquired distribution rights for Australia and it was released in three cinemas on 15 August 2024.

It was announced that the American streaming service Shudder, as well as AMC Networks, had purchased the rights to The Demon Disorder, to be screened from 6 September 2024.

The Demon Disorder was slated for a theatrical release in Australia in mid-2024, with international distribution expected to follow. The film generated buzz before its release due to its psychological depth and atmospheric horror elements.

== Reception ==
=== Box office ===
The Demon Disorder grossed over $1,345. The film debuted at number one during its opening weekend in Australia, securing the top spot at the box office.

=== Critical response ===
On the review aggregator website Rotten Tomatoes, 10% of 50 critics' reviews are positive, with an average rating of 4.8/10.

Culture Crypt wrote that For his first feature, Boyle does precisely what new directors on restricted budgets are usually supposed to do. Cynics might wrongly call the film "cheap" when what Boyle accomplishes is to keep his movie manageable. The synopsis might lead someone to mistake "The Demon Disorder" for yet another routine possession thriller, but the film only echoes common exorcism tropes when looked at reductively. With content constructed around a metaphor for dealing with figurative family demons, the movie doesn't tread into the typical territory of priests spraying holy water or black-eyed victims barfing up pea soup and religious obscenities in equal measure. The film also got a score of 60 out of 100.

Abbie Bernstein of Assignmentx praised The Demon Disorder, writing, "While there have been several other films using possession as a metaphor for more conventional deterioration, the mood and methods of The Demon Disorder make it unique and affecting enough to be worthy of attention. The film approaches demonic possession as if it were a hereditary physical disease, blending Cronenbergian body horror with a family drama that incorporates both tragic and darkly humorous elements." Bernstein also commended Boyle for maintaining a sense of reality amidst the film's surreal moments. She noted that the sets reflect the decay of environments neglected by people unable to care for them, which mirrors the characters' internal struggles. The brothers’ experiences and beliefs shape how they cope with their circumstances, and the palpable weight of their guilt creates a tense atmosphere throughout the film.

Louisa Moore of Screen Zealots wrote that while The Demon Disorder has a strong setup and effective allegorical undertones, the film falters in its narrative. She noted that the story doesn't bring much new to the table, revolving around the brothers confronting a demonic force representing their father’s anger and alcoholism—a plot that feels overly familiar. Moore described The Demon Disorder as a mixed bag, praising the film’s excellent performances, strong production values, and evocative sense of place, but ultimately feeling that the story falls short of fully realizing its potential. Karina Adelgaar of Heaven Of Horror wrote "While the practical effects seen in The Demon Disorder easily make the biggest impact, it all comes together and works as well as it does thanks to the cast. This is a perfectly cast horror movie and the combination of story, effects, and cast is brilliant". It all comes together perfectly from John Noble as the father to brothers portrayed by Charles Cottier, Christian Willis, and Dirk Hunter Even the smaller supporting roles are cast wonderfully with Tobie Webster as the mechanic Cole and Amy Ingram as a police officer.
