= 825 Forest Road =

2025 film by Stephen Cognetti

- Release poster
- Directed by: Stephen Cognetti
- Written by: Stephen Cognetti
- Produced by: Joe Bandelli; Dana Guerin; Cindi Rice
- Starring: Elizabeth Vermilyea; Kathryn Miller; Joe Bandelli; Joe Falcone; Madeleine Garcia; Brian Anthony Wilson
- Cinematography: David Gordon
- Edited by: Brian D. Lambert
- Music by: Karl Preusser
- Production companies: Cognetti Films; Epic Level Entertainment; Marylous' Boys
- Distributed by: Falcon Films; Shudder
- Release date: April 4, 2025
- Running time: 101 minutes
- Country: United States
- Language: English

825 Forest Road is a 2025 American supernatural horror film written and directed by Stephen Cognetti. It stars Elizabeth Vermilyea, Kathryn Miller, Joe Bandelli, Joe Falcone, Madeleine Garcia and Brian Anthony Wilson. The film marks Cognetti's departure from his found footage roots into traditional narrative storytelling.

The plot follows the Wilson family, Chuck, his wife Maria, and his little sister Isabelle, as they move into a new home in Ashland Falls. The film is separated into chapters and the first three depicts the family's first few days in their new home, from the perspective of each family member.

== Plot ==
Chuck Wilson, his wife Maria, and his little sister Isabelle have recently moved into a new home after the death of his mother in a car accident. The relationship between the siblings is strained, as prior to the accident, he typically distanced himself from his biological family. The accident left Isabelle with depression and mental health issues, as she was present when her mother died. Isabelle prefers therapy; however, Chuck pressures her to take medication like his wife, sparking a fight between the siblings.

Soon after they move into the home, Maria and Isabelle begin to experience strange supernatural occurrences. Chuck is approached by a neighbor, through which he learns that the town and his family is being haunted by the ghost of Helen Foster, who is known for particularly targeting mentally ill people and pushing them to suicide. Helen's harassment of Maria and Isabelle increases in severity, culminating in her attacking the two. She possesses Maria, which goes undetected by Isabelle and Chuck.

The siblings realize that the only way to stop Helen is to find and destroy her home on 825 Forest Road, which no one has been able to locate. With the help of Isabelle's friend Luke, they realize that the home lies outside the town, which shrank its borders over time. Maria is left at home with Luke while the siblings set out on their task. While they are gone, the family's realtor arrives to film a testimonial. During the filming, Helen speaks through Maria, revealing that she began targeting the town after her daughter died of suicide due to brutal bullying. Helen had attempted to stop the bullying by talking to the bully's parents and sending them letters, which only made things worse. Attempts to have the town and school intervene were similarly ignored, causing her to turn into a vengeful spirit when she also took her own life. Helen then attacks and kills Luke and the realtor. Meanwhile, at the home Chuck finds Helen's letters and realizes that 825 Forest Road was where the bully lived and that Helen's real home is the one he shares with his family. Before he can take any action, Helen arrives in her ghost form and attacks the siblings before the film cuts to black.

== Cast ==
- Joe Falcone as Chuck
- Elizabeth Vermilyea as Maria, Chuck's wife
- Kathryn Miller as Isabelle, Chuck's little sister
- Joe Bandelli as Julian
- Madeleine Garcia as Ashley
- Brian Anthony Wilson as Terrence
- Lorenzo Beronilla as Larry
- Jessica Albano as Natalie
- Darin F. Earl II as Luke
- Monica Fleurette as Bonnie
- Leyah Rose as Molly
- Lyndsey Bentham as Olivia
- Deirdre Koczur as Ally
- Claudia Langmaid as Mother
- Ray Acevedo as Carl
- Mike Sutton as Thomas
- Diomira Keane as Helen Foster
- Annabelle Lucas as Martha

== Production ==
In October 2024, Blue Finch Films has acquired worldwide rights of the film. The deal was ahead of the film's festival premiere planned for 2025, with Blue Finch set to launch sales at the American Film Market in November 2024. The film reunites Cognetti with "Hell House LLC" producer Joe Bandelli who produces alongside Dana Guerin and Cindi Rice for Epic Level Entertainment and John Frank Rosenblum serves as executive producer.

In February 2025, Shudder acquired the North American, UK-Ireland and Australia-New Zealand rights of the film from the UK's Blue Finch Films.

On March 13, 2025, Shudder announced the premiere date, release, trailer and poster of the film.

== Release ==
The film was released on April 4, 2025, via streaming on Shudder.

== Reception ==
On the review aggregator website Rotten Tomatoes, 36% of 14 critics' reviews are positive, with an average rating of 4.20/10.

Hannah Gearan of Screen Rant gave the film a rating of 3 over 10 and she wrote: “The sibling relationship works but there are too many repetitive scenes that don't add anything to the film“. Tyler Doupe' of Dread Central gave the film a rating of 2.0 and he said: “‘825 Forest Road’ is full of loose ends and lacks the kind of atmospheric tension a horror film needs to thrive.”

Brian Tallerico of RogerEbert.com gave the film a negative review and rating it a 1 star over 4 stars and wrote: “The shallow script might be forgivable if Cognetti produced some legitimate scares, but it feels like the found-footage genre suited his visual sensibilities more.”

Culture Crypt gave the film a review score of 70 over 100 and wrote: “The film is a solid 7/10 for those who appreciate the slow burn of psychological suspense, and is recommended for fans of movies made by indie artists who put sincere commitment into personal projects.”
