= Autopsy Torment =

Swedish death metal band

- Origin: Halmstad, Sweden
- Genres: Death metal, thrash metal
- Years active: 1989–present
- Members: The Demon; Thomas Karlsson; Daniel Nilssen
- Past members: Karl Vincent (Sexual Goat Licker); Onkel; Thomas Hedlund; Daniel Nilsen; Jimi "The Demon"; Patrik Borgkvist

Autopsy Torment is a Swedish death metal band formed in 1989. The band was started by Thomas Karlsson, Autopsy Torment's frontman and singer, with Onkel on guitars. In 1991, the band became a trio with drummer Karl Vincent (Sexual Goatlicker) and guitarist Daniel Nilsen. They wrote and recorded the demo Darkest Rituals that year. A period of constant personnel changes followed, with Thomas Karlsson and Karl Vincent as the core members.

In 1992, the band split up and Karlsson started black metal band Pagan Rites, later becoming the vocalist for doom band Tristitia. In 1999, the 1991 line-up reformed with The Demon on bass. Daniel and The Demon had been writing new songs, and after talking with Karlsson, they reformed Autopsy Torment to work on and release new material. The band released the album Orgy with the Dead on Miriquidi Productions in 2002, and the follow-up album Tormentorium on Painkiller Records in 2003. Karlsson actively works with his own project, Devil Lee Rot, and with Pagan Rites. Pulverized Records released an Autopsy Torment compilation album named 7th Ritual for the Darkest Soul of Hell in 2008 containing the demos Darkest Rituals, The Seventh Soul of Hell and Moonfog EP-sessions, all originally released in 1992.

The compilation album 7th Ritual for the Darkest Soul of Hell was mastered in Unisound Studio by Dan Swanö, founder of Swedish progressive death metal band Edge of Sanity and member of several other bands. The cover design for the album was created by Chris Moyen.

== Members ==
=== Current lineup ===
- Thomas Karlsson – vocals

(The rest of the line-up is currently unknown)

=== Former members ===
- The Demon – bass
- Daniel Nilsen – guitar
- David "Slaughter" Stranderud – guitar
- Karl Vincent (Sexual Goat Licker) – drums
- Onkel – guitars (first demo)
- Thomas Hedlund – drums

Thomas Hedlund is not the same person that plays in Cult of Luna.

== Discography ==
- Jason Lives (Demo, 1989)
- Splattered (Demo, 1990)
- Darkest Rituals (Demo, 1991)
- Moon Fog (EP, 1992)
- Advanced Tape (Demo, 1992)
- Nocturnal Blasphemy (Demo, 1992)
- The Seventh Soul Of Hell (Demo, 1992)
- Orgy with the Dead (LP, 2001)
- Darkest Rituals (EP, 2002)
- Premature Torment/Pagan From The Heat (Split with Devil Lee Rot, 2003)
- Tormentorium (LP/CD, 2003)
- Graveyard Creatures (LP, 2005)
- 7th Ritual for the Darkest Soul Of Hell (Digi-CD, 2008)
