= Bleed with Me =

2020 film directed by Amelia Moses

- Film poster
- Directed by: Amelia Moses
- Written by: Amelia Moses
- Produced by: Lee Marshall; Amelia Moses; Mariel Sharp
- Starring: Lee Marshall; Lauren Beatty; Aris Tyros
- Distributed by: Shudder
- Release date: August 26, 2020
- Running time: 80 minutes
- Country: Canada
- Language: English

Bleed with Me is a 2020 Canadian psychological horror drama film written and directed by Amelia Moses.

== Premise ==
A young woman named Rowan spends time in a remote cabin with her friend Emily and Emily's boyfriend Brendan. As time passes, Rowan begins to suspect that Emily is stealing her blood.

== Cast ==
- Lee Marshall as Rowan
- Lauren Beatty as Emily
- Aris Tyros as Brendan

== Release ==
Bleed with Me was released in Canada on August 26, 2020 at the Fantasia International Film Festival.

== Reception ==
On the review aggregator website Rotten Tomatoes, 83% of 23 critics' reviews are positive. The website's consensus reads: "An auspicious debut for writer-director Amelia Moses, the smartly restrained Bleed with Me taps a rich vein of psychological horror."

Leslie Felperin, writing for The Guardian, gave the film 3 stars out of 5, calling it "tautly constructed." Richard Whittaker of The Austin Chronicle gave the film a positive review, calling its narrative "lean and ambiguous", and commenting that Moses "keeps a deft grasp on her symbolism and imagery." Natalia Keogan of Paste commented that it is "efficacious" in its "sparse simplicity", "leaving ample room for carefully crafted ambiance and performances to arrest the viewer with mounting dread and anticipation."
