= Hell House LLC Origins: The Carmichael Manor =

2023 film by Stephen Cognetti

- Official release poster
- Directed by: Stephen Cognetti
- Screenplay by: Stephen Cognetti
- Based on: Characters by Stephen Cognetti
- Produced by: Joe Bandelli
- Starring: Bridget Rose Perrotta; Destiny Leilani Brown; James Liddell
- Cinematography: Josh Layton
- Production companies: Cognetti Films; Marylous' Boys
- Distributed by: Terror Films; Shudder
- Release date: October 30, 2023
- Running time: 98 minutes
- Country: United States
- Language: English

Hell House LLC Origins: The Carmichael Manor is a 2023 American direct-to-streaming found footage horror film written and directed by Stephen Cognetti. It simultaneously serves as a prequel to Hell House LLC (2015) and a sequel to both Hell House LLC II: The Abaddon Hotel (2018) and Hell House LLC III: Lake of Fire (2019), and is the fourth installment overall in the Hell House LLC franchise. Produced by Joe BandelliI, it stars Bridget Rose Perrotta, Destiny Leilani Brown, James Liddell.

== Plot ==
Filmmaker and paranormal investigator Margot, her girlfriend Rebecca, and her brother Chase travel to a remote manor house in Rockland County to document their investigation of the Carmichael family murders. They investigate the disappearance of the primary suspects: the family patriarch, Arthur Carmichael, and his son, Patrick. Margot recounts how her interest in the paranormal began after a man tried to abduct her at a carnival when she was a child. In the house, they find a locked storage room full of the Carmichael family's belongings, including three clown mannequins.

Margot and Rebecca examine artifacts from the Abaddon Hotel at a local antique store. Rebecca recognizes a grandfather clock from the hotel and discovers film reels, documents, and a cross pendant in its hidden compartment. At the manor, Chase is disturbed by the clowns' apparent movement and the presence of a masked woman. After Margot and Rebecca return, Chase convinces them that the manor is haunted.

The recovered film reels depict Catherine Carmichael before and after her sister Margaret's death, who was killed in a car crash that also left Patrick with a broken arm. Following the accident, Patrick became withdrawn and disturbed, to which Catherine gave him the pendant to protect him. Further footage reveals that Patrick joined a cult run by Andrew Tully in hopes of resurrecting Margaret. The cult members invade the manor, where Margaret's ghost kills Catherine.

In the present, Rebecca's presentation to a real estate partner is disrupted by Catherine's ghost. Rebecca convinces Margot to leave the manor in the morning, but Chase disappears overnight. Footage recorded by Chase reveals that he was stalked and killed by one of the clown mannequins. Margot and Rebecca attempt to leave the house, but are unable to because the car battery is dead. They try to walk to the nearest town, but are forced to flee back to the manor after being harassed by cult members.

Disturbing text messages from Chase drive the two women to flee into the car, but the cult members surround them. Returning to the manor again, Margot hears Chase calling for her, leaving Rebecca, who is killed by Catherine's ghost. Margot finds Chase's eyeless corpse before being stalked by the clown, who corners and attacks her. Patrick is identified as the clown and the one who tried to abduct Margot as a child. In old footage recorded by Patrick, he apologizes to the camera before yelling at an unseen man to be quiet, before departing into a red room.

A mid-credit scene features Alice mentioning that the fair is coming back to town. In the background, a clown peeks through a window.

== Cast ==
- Bridget Rose Perrotta as Margot Bentley
- Destiny Leilani Brown as Rebecca Vickers
- James Liddell as Chase Bentley
- Gideon Berger as Patrick Carmichael
- Cayla Berejikian as Catherine Carmichael
- Victoria Andrunik as Margaret Carmichael
- Darin F. Earl II as Bradley Moynahan
- Searra Sawka as Alicia Cavalini
- Michael Caprioli as Donald
- Thomas J. Cipriano as Tom Wheeler
- Dayna Michelle Kurtz as Linda
- Marlene Williams as Eleanor Carmichael
- Celeste Cicon as Antique Store Clerk
- Robert Savakinus as Arthur Carmichael (uncredited)
- Joe Bandelli as Hell House Clown (uncredited)

== Production ==
In October 2022, Terror Films announced that Stephen Cognetti would continue the Hell House LLC franchise with the prequel titled Hell House LLC Origins: The Carmichael Manor.

=== Filming ===
On April 15, 2023, Stephen Cognetti announced that filming had begun.

== Release ==
The film had its limited release on October 24, 2023, and was released on October 30, 2023, by Shudder.

== Reception ==
On the review aggregator website Rotten Tomatoes, 88% of 17 critics' reviews are positive, with an average rating of 6.80/10.

Phil Hoad of The Guardian rated the film 4 out of 5 stars and said: "It isn't just Cognetti's solid deployment of the backstory that impresses; he and cinematographer Josh Layton also show a devious command of camera mechanics, vital to the subjective found-footage experience." Maegan Navarro of Bloody Disgusting gave the film a rating of 3.5 out of 5 and wrote: "While the effective, goosebump-inducing scares and refreshing expansion of the story feel like a return to form for this franchise, The Carmichael Manor is hampered by its found footage format. The intrepid Margot makes the familiar missteps into found footage trope territory that seals her group's fate."

== Sequel ==
In July 2024, a fifth installment, titled Hell House LLC: Lineage, was announced with a teaser trailer. It was released in 2025.
