= Infirmary (film) =

2026 independent found-footage horror film

- Promotional release poster
- Directed by: Nicholas Pineda
- Written by: Katy Krauland; Nicholas Pineda
- Produced by: Nicholas Pineda; Katy Krauland
- Starring: Paul Syre Lee; Mark Anthony Williams; Danielle Kennedy; Corinna Wagner-Smith
- Cinematography: Donald Nam
- Edited by: Noah Kistler
- Production companies: Amalgam Films; Witchcraft Motion Picture Company
- Distributed by: ESC Films; Shudder
- Release dates: January 16, 2026 (DWF); October 2, 2026
- Running time: 85 minutes
- Country: United States
- Language: English

Infirmary is a 2026 American independent found-footage psychological horror film directed by Nicholas Pineda in his film directorial debut, and co-written by Pineda and Katy Krauland. The film developed as a guerrilla style due to its budget.

== Plot ==
A public service announcement screen from the FBI states that the following footage was recovered from bodycams and security cameras at Wilshire Infirmary in 2023.

Recently discharged ex-Marine Edward Yoon begins his first night shift as a security guard at an abandoned psychiatric hospital. The only other people in the building are Lester Wooley, a cynical former cop who acts as the senior security guard and Edward's boss, and Ms Downey, a kindly administrator who exhibits strange, catatonic behaviour when Edward leaves her office.

During a tour of the building, Lester locks Edward inside a mortuary refrigerator with a bloodied mannequin head as a hazing ritual. Lester explains the dark history of the hospital, including rumours of cruel medical experimentation on patients. He also shows Edward several patient documents, explaining that the patients don't care about privacy because they're all dead.

Upon returning to the surveillance room, the two men notice an intruder, who Lester refers to as a "tweaker" on the security monitors. Lester confronts the intruder over the tannoy system, causing her to panic and destroy the security camera. Lester and Edward set out to find her. During the search, they pass a dark corridor, which Lester instructs Edward to avoid at all costs. Eventually, they conclude that the intruder has fled through a broken window and return to the surveillance room again.

A power outage causes Lester to head to the basement to flip the breaker switch. He leaves Edward in the surveillance room, instructing him to watch the security monitors when the power comes back on. Over the radio, he informs Edward that the experiments carried out by the Wilshires attempted to transfer the minds of patients into mannequins.

Edward leaves to investigate a sound in the corridor. He finds a mannequin and attempts to return it to the chapel, where he had been shown they were stored. However he finds the room abandoned. Panicked, he attempts to radio Lester, who is unresponsive. As the power returns, Edward runs into Mrs Downey, who offers to take him to the basement to find Lester. She leads him down the forbidden corridor and disappears when they enter the basement.

Edward desperately searches for an exit from the basement. He finds documents confirming the mind transfer experiments and notices a strange, emaciated, mannequin-like creature stalking him around the basement. As he attempts to flee, he discovers Lester's bloodied, beaten corpse in the breaker room. He sees Ms Downey and demands answers from her; however, he shortly realises that this is also a mannequin, which he beats in frustration. The emaciated creatures enters the breaker room and attacks Edward.

A second FBI PSA states that Edward Yoon is missing and a person of interest in the deaths of Lester Wooley and Ambrosia Downey. It advises that "Edward Yoon" is likely an alias, as there is no documentation of his existence or his military service.

Back at the hospital, body camera footage shows what appears to be Edward in a catatonic, mannequin like state in the chapel.

== Cast ==
- Paul Syre Lee as Edward Yoon
- Mark Anthony Williams as Lester Wooley
- Danielle Kennedy as Ambrosia Downey
- Corinna Wagner-Smith as Tweaker

== Production ==
The film is directed by Nicholas Pineda, written by Pineda and Katy Krauland, cinematography by Donald Nam from the original score of Stephan Birch. The film is under Amalgam Films and Witchcraft Motion Picture Company banner. Raven Banner Entertainment acquired world sales rights of the film.

== Release ==
The film was premiered at the Dances With Films NY festival at Regal Union Square in New York City on January 16, 2026, and on FrightFest on August 30, 2026. It is scheduled to release on Shudder on October 2, 2026.

== Reception ==
On the review aggregator website Rotten Tomatoes, 50% of 20 critics' reviews are positive, with an average rating of 5.80/10.

Kat Hughes of The Hollywood News gave the film a positive review, a rating of 4 over 5 and she wrote: Some clever camera construction and an intensely oppressive atmosphere keep the audience on edge throughout as it throws well executed scares and an intriguing found-footage mystery onto the screen.

Received a positive feedback by Rebecca Sayce of FilmHounds, she gave the film a 3 over 5 rating and she said: Infirmary is a strong feature debut for Pineda which, despite its faults in terms of its script and narrative shortcomings, knows exactly how to strike fear in viewers.

Three over five was also given by Karina Adelgaard of Heaven of Horror and she said: ...efficient in its execution, even if the story itself is rather small. Then again, with a character-driven story, you can focus on a smaller story and let the character play a bigger role. It certainly works for Infirmary.

However, Chad Collins of Dread Central gave the film a negative feedback and a 1.5 over 5 rating and he wrote: Quite simply, Infirmary is never meaningfully scary. There are interludes hinting at enduring haunts and vicious experiments, but they never coalesce into anything beyond a barrage of loud noises and shrieking sound design.
