= Inside of Me (film) =

- Official One-Sheet
- Directed by: Robert X. Golphin
- Written by: Robert X. Golphin (screenplay)
- Produced by: Lori M. Childress; Gail Y. Bennett
- Starring: Lauren Jane Krystofolski; Tony Kates
- Cinematography: Steve Laramie
- Edited by: Steve Laramie Christopher J. Montero
- Release date: 2009
- Running time: 12 minutes
- Country: United States
- Language: English

Inside of Me is a 2009 short film directed by filmmaker Robert X. Golphin, about a woman who is told that she can't have children. She becomes convinced there's something growing within her. It's the psychological and physical exploration of how devastating news and mysterious happenings threaten to destroy the relationship and lives of a loving couple.

== Cast ==
- Lauren Jane Krystofolski as Sharon
- Tony Kates as Todd
- Lori M. Childress as Doctor

== Awards ==
| Year | Festival | Award | Category | Result |
|---|---|---|---|---|
| 2010 | Atlantic City Cinefest | Best | Local Short | Won |
| 2010 | Atlantic City Cinefest | Best Actress (Lauren Jane Krystofolski) | Short (Drama) | Nominated |
| 2010 | Philafilm: Philadelphia Int'l Film Festival | Best Short Subject Film | Honorable Mention | Won |
| 2010 | WorldFest Houston | Bronze Remi Award | Women's Issues | Won |
| 2010 | Accolade Award | Merit | Short Film | Won |
| 2010 | Accolade Award | Merit | Direction | Won |
| 2010 | Trail Dance Film Festival | Best | Narrative Short | Nominated |
| 2009 | Los Angeles Reel Film Festival | Best Narrative Short | Honorable Mention | Won |
| 2009 | Indie Short Film Competition | Best | Narrative Short | Finalist |
| 2009 | Los Angeles Reel Film Festival | Best Narrative Short | Actress (Lauren Jane Krystofolski) | Nominated |

== Exhibition ==
The film has screened at: Queens Int'l Film Fest, Reelblack Short Film Showcase, Los Angeles Reel Film Fest, Trail Dance Film Fest, New York Short Film Fest, New Filmmakers New York, Worldfest Houston Int'l Film Fest, Philadelphia Int'l Film Festival, Indie Short Film Competition And Atlantic City Cinefest.

It was announced that Inside of Me was selected to screen at a New York event called "Art in Motion" on Friday, June 15, 2012.
