= Telluride Horror Show =

Horror film festival

- Location: Telluride, Colorado, USA
- Founded: 2010
- Language: International
- Website: telluridehorrorshow.com

The Telluride Horror Show is a genre film festival that takes place in the mountain resort town of Telluride, Colorado.

Over a three day weekend each mid-October, the festival exhibits horror, dark fantasy films, sci-fi films, and thriller films from around the world and attendees from all over the United States.

The New York Times named it one of the "5 Halloween Festivals Worth Traveling For", Moviemaker Magazine included it in the "World's 50 Best Genre Festivals" in 2021, and Dread Central named it one of "The Best Horror Festivals in the World" in 2022.

== History ==
Founded in 2010, the Telluride Horror Show is Colorado's first and longest-running genre film festival.

Films are shown in three theaters: the Palm, the Nugget Theater, and the historic Sheridan Opera House.

Additional events include the Creepy Campfire Tales and book signing with an established author from the horror genre, the Pig Roast, the I Scream Social, the Killer Karaoke Party, and the Dread Central Horror Trivia competition.

Since its inception, the festival's pulp magazine-style posters have been created by cartoonist/illustrator Mark Zingarelli.

At the 2015 festival, writer/director producer Henry Selick settled the long-running debate that his 1993 classic The Nightmare Before Christmas is a Halloween movie, not a Christmas movie.

In 2018, the festival opened a brick and mortar horror merchandise store, Gargoyle's Gift Shop.

== Special Guests ==
2019

Kelly Link, Pulitzer Prize finalist and MacArthur genius grant winner

Joe Bob Briggs, film critic and performer

Eli Craig, director of Tucker & Dale vs. Evil

Joshua Hoffine, horror photographer

Meredith Borders, managing editor of Fangoria

Jeremy Robert Johnson, horror author

2018

Meredith Borders, managing editor of Fangoria

Stephen Chiodo, writer/director of Killer Klowns from Outer Space

Jeremy Robert Johnson, horror author

Paul G. Tremblay, horror author and editor

2017

Meredith Borders

Jon Davison, film producer

Jeremy Robert Johnson

Tyler MacIntyre, director of Tragedy Girls

Greg McLean, film director

Patrick Brice, film director

2016

Joe R. Lansdale, horror author

Sam Suchmann and Mattie Zufelt, writers/stars of Spring Break Zombie Massacre

2015

Henry Selick, writer/producer/director

John Carroll Lynch, actor/director

Stephen Cognetti, writer/director of Hell House LLC

== See also ==
- List of fantastic and horror film festivals
