= Shudder (streaming service) =

Online streaming service

- Website type: OTT platform
- Available in: English
- Founded: Mid-2015 (beta testing); October 2016; 10 years ago (official launch)
- Headquarters: United States
- Area served: Australia; Canada; Ireland; New Zealand; United Kingdom; United States
- Owner: AMC Global Media
- Services: Video on demand
- Parent: IFC Entertainment Group
- Website: shudder.com
- Registration: Monthly subscription through authorized distributor required to access content
- Users: 3 million (estimate)
- Current status: Active

Shudder is an American subscription video on-demand over-the-top streaming television service owned and operated by AMC Global Media.

It primarily distributes horror, thriller, and supernatural fiction titles, including original programming such as Creepshow (based on the 1982 film) and a variety of docuseries. The service's content are distributed on home video by RLJE Films under the platform's label.

== Distribution ==
Shudder began with an invite-only beta testing in the United States in mid-2015. By October 2016, Shudder was fully out of beta testing and had expanded to Canada, the United Kingdom, and Ireland. It was also one of VRV's partners to have a channel at VRV from its initial launch in late 2016 to mid 2019.

Shudder is available on Android and Apple mobile devices, Amazon Fire devices, Android TV, Apple TV, Roku, Xbox One, Xbox Series X/S, Chromecast as well as subscription via Amazon Video in monthly or annual subscriptions. Shudder was also available as part of the VRV combo pack from August 2017 through July 2019.

In the US, a monthly subscription currently runs at $6.99 each month, while in other countries the price is adjusted according to the local currency.

On August 16, 2020, Shudder extended its operations to Australia and New Zealand.

In October 2022, Shudder was included as part of a bundle package during the launch of the AMC+ streaming service in New Zealand.

== Content ==
In October 2016, Aja Romano writing for Vox noted that Shudder had over 500 horror films with their closest competitor, Screambox, carrying 400. Romano said Shudder had an "impressive selection of higher-quality films." Charlie Lyne, writing for The Guardian, notes that the UK version of Shudder carried around 200 films. Channel curators Sam Zimmerman and Colin Geddes offer categories like "Urban Decay", "Slashics", and "Not Your Ordinary Bloodsucker", which break the library down to specific sub-categories. Zimmerman previously worked for Fangoria and Shock Til You Drop while Geddes was previously a film programmer for the Toronto International Film Festival.

In late 2016, Shudder began carving out windows of exclusivity, premiering Rob Zombie's 31 two weeks before the DVD release and exclusively carrying the 4K restoration of Don Coscarelli's Phantasm. In another streaming exclusive, in March 2017, Shudder began carrying the full 109-minute unrated version of The Devils. This is the first time since the film's release in 1971 that the unrated cut of the film has been available in the United States. In June 2017, Shudder announced a full slate of original series in development, including Riprore, from director Patty Jenkins, and an adaptation of Emily Schultz's novel, The Blondes. In 2018, Shudder continued to release exclusive and original films and series, including Mayhem starring Steven Yeun and Samara Weaving, Downrange directed by Ryuhei Kitamura, Revenge, and the Syfy series Channel Zero and others.

In July 2018, Shudder hosted a 24-hour live event with legendary horror host Joe Bob Briggs titled The Last Drive-in with Joe Bob Briggs during which fans got to watch films such as Tourist Trap and Sleepaway Camp with Joe Bob's famous commentary included throughout. During the premiere, Shudder's servers crashed as a result of an overwhelming number of subscribers attempting to access the service's new Live Stream feature. Despite the server errors, the series received critical acclaim from critics and horror fans alike. Shortly after the marathon, Shudder announced that they were bringing Briggs back for additional events in 2018 and 2019. On July 20, Shudder announced on social media the series would be returning for a full 9-episode season. After success with season 1, a second season was confirmed on May 22, 2019.

Since January 23, 2020, Shudder has distributed The Dead Lands, a Māori–themed supernatural series set in pre-contact New Zealand, that was jointly produced by AMC and New Zealand public broadcaster TVNZ. Shudder distributes the series in the US, Canada, UK, and Ireland while TVNZ On Demand has distribution rights for New Zealand.

On July 20, 2021, the horror-genre film Rot was released on Shudder platform. Shudder acquired the distribution rights for the horror film You'll Never Find Me in North America, Ireland and the United Kingdom following its premiere at the 2023 Tribeca Festival.

Shudder annually airs a Halloween "Ghoul Log" (a Halloween-themed equivalent to the Yule Log).

== Exclusives and originals ==
Current Shudder exclusives
Title	Year	Country	Notes
Therapy	2016	France	
31	2016	United States	
The Corpse of Anna Fritz	2016	Spain	
Witching and Bitching	2016	Spain	
Shrew's Nest	2016	Spain	
Lake Bodom	2016	Finland	
Dearest Sister	2017	Laos	
Sadako vs. Kayako	2017	Japan	
We Go On	2017	United States	
Sweet, Sweet Lonely Girl	2017	United States	
Noroi: The Curse	2017	Japan	
Kuso	2017	United States	
Small Town Killers	2017	Denmark	
Found Footage 3D	2017	United States	Available in 2D and 3D
Can't Take It Back	2017	United States	
Spookers	2017	Australia/New Zealand	Documentary
Sam Was Here	2017	France/United States	
Don't Grow Up	2018	France/Spain	
Mayhem	2018	United States	
Dead Shack	2018	Canada	
Last Ones Out	2018	South Africa	
Cold Hell	2018	Germany	
Mon Mon Mon Monsters	2018	Taiwan	
Downrange	2018	United States	
The Noonday Witch	2018	Czech Republic	
Still/Born	2018	Canada	
Sequence Break	2018	United States	
Ruin Me	2018	United States	
Hell House LLC II: The Abaddon Hotel	2018	United States	
The Nightshifter	2019	Brazil	
Tigers Are Not Afraid	2019	Mexico	
Hell House LLC III: Lake of Fire	2019	United States	
Nightmare Cinema	2019	United States	
A Bluebird in My Heart	2019	Belgium/France	
Trivisa	2019	Hong Kong/China	
Boar	2019	Australia	
One Cut of the Dead	2019	Japan	
Incident in a Ghostland	2019	Canada/France	
Haunt	2019	United States	
Bliss	2020	United States	
Confessional	2020	United States	
In Search of Darkness	2020	United Kingdom/United States	Documentary
The Wind	2020	United States	
Verotika	2020	United States	
Beyond the Gates	2020	United States	
32 Malasana Street	2020	Spain	
Daniel Isn't Real	2020	United States	
Blood Vessel	2020	Australia	
The Pale Door	2021	United States	
The Dark and the Wicked	2021	United States	
The Power	2021	United Kingdom	
In Search of Darkness: Part II	2021	United Kingdom/United States	Documentary
Relic	2021	United States/Australia	
The Reckoning	2021	United Kingdom	
Psycho Goreman	2021	Canada	
The Amusement Park	2021	United States	Mid-length movie
Possessor	2021	Canada/United Kingdom	
The Toll	2021	Canada	
Jakob's Wife	2021	United States	
Mosquito State	2021	Poland/United States	
Seance	2021	United States/United Kingdom	
The Medium	2021	Thailand/South Korea	
The Night	2021	Iran/United States	
All the Creatures Were Stirring	2021	United States	
For the Sake of Vicious	2022	Canada	
Woodlands Dark and Days Bewitched: A History of Folk Horror	2022	United States	Documentary
Boris Karloff: The Man Behind the Monster	2022	United Kingdom	Documentary
The Scary of Sixty-First	2022	United States	
The Bunker Game	2022	Italy/France	
The Spine of Night	2022	United States	Animated movie
You Might Be the Killer	2022	United States	
A Banquet	2022	United Kingdom	
Offseason	2022	United States	
The Long Night	2022	United States	
This Is GWAR	2022	United States	Documentary
On the 3rd Day	2022	Argentina	
The Reef: Stalked	2022	Australia	
Allegoria	2022	United States	
The Innocents	2022	Norway	
So Vam	2022	Australia	
Watcher	2022	United States	
Resurrection	2022	United States	
She Will	2022	United Kingdom	
Flux Gourmet	2022	United Kingdom/United States	
Slash/Back	2022	Canada	
The Apology	2022	United States	
The Lair	2023	United Kingdom/United States/Hungary	
Nocebo	2023	Ireland/Philippines	
The Witch: Part 2. The Other One	2023	South Korea	
Kids vs. Aliens	2023	United States	
Huesera: The Bone Woman	2023	Mexico/Peru	
Consecration	2023	United States	
Unwelcome	2023	Ireland/United Kingdom	
Children of the Corn	2023	United States	
The Angry Black Girl and Her Monster	2023	United States	
Hell House LLC Origins: The Carmichael Manor	2023	United States	
It's a Wonderful Knife	2023	United States	
Suitable Flesh	2024	United States	
Skeletons in the Closet	2024	United States	
Satanic Hispanics	2024	United States	
Baghead	2024	Germany/United Kingdom	
Exhuma	2024	South Korea	
Arcadian	2024	United States/Ireland/Canada	
Humane	2024	Canada/United States	
Dancing Village: The Curse Begins	2024	Indonesia	
The Exorcism	2024	United States	
Out Come the Wolves	2024	Canada	
Last Straw	2024	United States	
Get Away	2025	United Kingdom	
Little Bites	2025	United States	
Bloody Axe Wound	2025	United States	
Starve Acre	2025	United Kingdom	
Ash	2025	United States	
Monster Island	2025	Singapore/Indonesia/Japan	
Clown in a Cornfield	2025	United States	
The Twin	2025	United States	
Dangerous Animals	2025	United States/Australia	
Perewangan	2025	Indonesia	
House on Eden	2025	United States	
Abraham's Boys	2025	United States	
Queens of the Dead	2025	United States	
The Jester 2	2025	United States	
Chain Reactions	2026	United States	Documentary
Beast of War	2026	Australia	
Deathstalker	2026	Canada/United States	
Somnium	2026	United States	
Night Patrol	2026	United States/United Kingdom	
Heresy	2026	Netherlands	
Whistle	2026	Canada/Ireland	
Something Is About to Happen	2026	Spain/Romania	
This Is Not A Test	2026	Canada/United States	
Touch Me	2026	United States	
Exit 8	2026	Japan	
The Yeti	2026	United States	
Buffet Infinity	2026	Canada	
Mārama	2026	New Zealand	
Big Baby	2026	United States	
Hunting Matthew Nichols	2026	Canada	
Tinsman Road	2026	United States	
Ice Cream Man	2026	United States	
