= Underemployed =

Underemployed may refer to:

- A person subject to underemployment
- Underemployed (TV series), a comedy-drama television series 2012–2013
