= Buckwild =

Buckwild may refer to:

- Buckwild (music producer), American hip hop producer
- Buckwild (TV series), an American reality television series
- Buck Wild, a 2013 comedy horror film
- "Buck Wild" (song), a 1989 song by Experience Unlimited
