= Amanda Baker =

American actress

- Occupation: Actress
- Years active: 2004–present

Amanda Baker is an American actress. She is best known for portraying Jolene Crowell on General Hospital: Night Shift in 2007 and Babe Carey Chandler on All My Children from 2007 to 2008. Baker reappeared on June 4 and 29, 2009 as a ghost on All My Children as Babe Chandler.

== Career ==
Baker starred as Jolene Crowell on General Hospital: Night Shift. She joined the cast of All My Children as the new Babe Carey Chandler on October 8, 2007. In an odd move, she debuted on the same day that actress Alexa Havins exited the role. When Babe hugged Krystal (the character's mother), it was Havins, but when the hug ceased, Amanda Baker was present. She departed from the role in October 2008. Baker reappeared on June 4 and 29, 2009 on All My Children as Babe's ghost.

== Filmography ==
- (2004): One Tree Hill as Charlotte
- (2004): The Dead Will Tell as Girl in Marsh
- (2005): Palmetto Pointe as Callah O'Connell
- (2005): Locusts as Gina
- (2006): Hello Sister, Goodbye Life as Betsy
- (2006): The Other Side as Waitress
- (2006): Surface as Wardrobe Girl
- (2007): Campus Ladies as Melanie
- (2007): General Hospital: Night Shift as Jolene Crowell
- (2007–09): All My Children as Arbella "Babe" Carey – Chandler (October 8, 2007 – October 31, 2008, June 4 and 29, 2009)
- (2010): Rules of Engagement as Meghan
- (2014): V/H/S: Viral as Houdini Girl #2 (segment "Dante the Great")
