= Atomica =

Atomica or Atomika may refer to:

- Atomica (character), a comic book character from DC Comics
- Atomica (film), 2017 American science-fiction thriller film directed by Dagen Merrill and starring Dominic Monaghan
- Atomika, comic book series by Andrew Dabb
- Atomika, fictional DJ in video game Burnout Paradise
- Atomica, a new beauty store format replacing some Priceline (Australia) stores
