= Zombie comedy =

Film and television genre

Zombie comedy, often called zom com or zomedy, is a film genre that aims to blend zombie horror motifs with slapstick comedy as well as morbid humor.

== History ==
The earliest roots of the genre can be found in Jean Yarbrough's King of the Zombies (1941) and Gordon Douglas's Zombies on Broadway (1945), though both of these films dealt with Haitian-style zombies. While not comedies, George A. Romero's Dawn of the Dead (1978) and Day of the Dead (1985) featured several comedic scenes and satirical commentary on society. An American Werewolf in London (1981) and the Return of the Living Dead series (1985) (especially the first two and the last of the series) can be considered some of the earliest examples of zombie-comedy using the modern zombie. Other early examples include Mr. Vampire (1985), C.H.U.D. II: Bud the C.H.U.D. (1989), Braindead (1992), and Bio Zombie (1998).

A popular modern zombie comedy is Edgar Wright's Shaun of the Dead (2004), a self-dubbed romantic zombie comedy, or RomZomCom, with many in-jokes and references to George A. Romero's earlier Dead films, especially Dawn of the Dead. Other popular zombie comedies include Gregg Bishop's Dance of the Dead (2008) and the 2009 film Zombieland.

Andrew Currie's Fido, Matthew Leutwyler's Dead & Breakfast, and Peter Jackson's Braindead are also examples of zombie comedies. Sam Raimi's Evil Dead II, although a more direct horror film, contains some lighthearted and dark comedy elements, and its sequel, Army of Darkness, is even more comedic. The Evil Dead franchise features evil spirits that possess dead and living bodies and even objects, however, rather than traditional-style zombies.

== List ==
Films that can be considered zombie comedies include:

- King of the Zombies (1941)
- Zombies on Broadway (1945)
- Mr. Vampire (1985)
- Re-Animator (1985)
- The Return of the Living Dead (1985)
- Redneck Zombies (1986)
- Night of the Creeps (1986)
- Return of the Living Dead Part II (1988)
- Dead Heat (1988)
- C.H.U.D. II: Bud the C.H.U.D. (1989)
- Bride of Re-Animator (1991)
- Army of Darkness (1992)
- Braindead (1992), New Zealand film released in the US as Dead Alive
- My Boyfriend's Back (1993)
- Return of the Living Dead 3 (1993)
- Bio Zombie (1998)
- Idle Hands (1999), starring Devon Sawa and Seth Green
- Stacy: Attack of the Schoolgirl Zombies (2001)
- Dead & Breakfast (2004)
- Shaun of the Dead (2004)
- SARS Wars (2004)
- Poultrygeist: Night of the Chicken Dead (2005)
- Tokyo Zombie (2005)
- Dead and Deader (2006)
- Fido (2006)
- Planet Terror (2007)
- Undead or Alive (2007)
- Dance of the Dead (2008)
- Zombie Strippers (2008)
- Dead Snow (2009)
- Zombieland (2009), starring Woody Harrelson, Jesse Eisenberg, Emma Stone and Abigail Breslin
- Juan de los Muertos (2010), Spanish-Cuban film released in the UK and US as Juan of the Dead
- Deadheads (2011)
- Remington and the Curse of the Zombadings (2011), also known as Zombadings 1: Patayin sa Shokot si Remington
- Cockneys vs Zombies (2012)
- Detention of the Dead (2012)
- ParaNorman (2012)
- Buck Wild (2013)
- Warm Bodies (2013)
- Go Goa Gone (2013)
- Zombie eXs (2013)
- Ang Huling Henya (2013)
- Burying the Ex (2014)
- Dead Snow 2: Red vs. Dead (2014)
- Life After Beth (2014)
- Stalled (2014)
- Scouts Guide to the Zombie Apocalypse (2015)
- Night of the Living Deb (2015)
- Pride and Prejudice and Zombies (2016)
- Oh My Zombie! (2016)
- One Cut of the Dead (2017), a low-budget Japanese film
- Anna and the Apocalypse (2017)
- Trip Ubusan: The Lolas vs. Zombies (2017)
- The Dead Don't Die (2019)
- The Odd Family: Zombie on Sale (2019), first South Korean zombie comedy film
- Eat, Brains, Love (2019)
- Zombieland: Double Tap (2019), sequel to Zombieland
- Little Monsters (2019)
- Zombie Reddy (2021)
- Aquarium of the Dead (2021)
- Izla (2021)
- Zombivli (2022)
- Zom 100: Bucket List of the Dead (2022), live-action adaptation of the manga of the same name
- My Zombabe (2024)
- Jombieland (2025)

== See also ==
- Cannibalism in popular culture
- Comedy horror
- List of comedy horror films
- Zombies in popular culture
