= Gregg Bishop =

American film director

- Writer, director, producer Gregg Bishop
- Born: Powder Springs, Georgia, United States
- Occupations: Screenwriter, film director, producer
- Website: greggbishop.com

Gregg Bishop is an American film director, producer and writer.

== Early life ==
Gregg Bishop grew up in Powder Springs, Georgia and started making movies with his father's Super 8 film cameras when he was 7 years old. He completed over 50 short films by age 16. Bishop attended McEachern High School where he wrote & directed his first full-length feature, a spy-thriller, at 17 years of age.

Bishop attended the USC School of Cinematic Arts in the Film Production Program. When he was a junior at the film school, he wrote and directed the multi-award winning short film Voodoo with his friend Ke Huy Quan producing and shooting. The short film won several awards including the Audience Award at the Slamdance Film Festival, and it is now screened at orientation for incoming USC film students along with the short films Electronic Labyrinth THX 1138 4EB by George Lucas and The Lift by Robert Zemeckis.

== Career ==
After graduating from the University of Southern California filmschool, Bishop took the profits he made from his short film Voodoo and financed his first feature film The Other Side himself with $15,000. The supernatural action/thriller starred Jaimie Alexander in her first leading role and premiered at the Slamdance Film Festival in Park City, Utah where it was picked up for a 2007 theatrical release. As of 2019 Bishop is currently developing the movie as a TV series.

In 2008, Bishop sold a TV series to Fox Television Studios and then directed and produced the feature film Dance of the Dead, starring Jared Kusnitz, Lucas Till, Blair Redford, Laura Slade Wiggins and Justin Welborn. The movie had its World Premiere at the SXSW Film Festival and was hand-picked by director Sam Raimi for distribution through Lions Gate Entertainment and Ghost House Pictures. Rob Tapert says “This was a movie that Sam Raimi and myself watched on a Sunday afternoon, we howled and we howled till Sam’s wife and kids started banging on his office door wondering if we were alright. I think I’ve watched it about five times so far.” Ain't It Cool News hailed the movie as "a cult classic" and Bloody-Disgusting called it "one of the best horror comedies ever made that will be remembered for years to come".

In 2011, Bishop wrote and directed the Webby award-winning short film The Birds of Anger starring Jaimie Alexander for NBCUniversal G4Films. The film was based on the best-selling mobile game, Rovio's Angry Birds, told in the style of the 1963 film The Birds by Alfred Hitchcock. In 2019, the film was selected by Robert Rodriguez to be featured on his El Rey Network.

Bishop wrote and directed a segment called "Dante The Great" for the third installment of the highly acclaimed V/H/S franchise called V/H/S: Viral which hit theaters November 21, 2014.

In 2016 Bishop directed the feature film Siren, which is an adaptation of the V/H/S segment "Amateur Night" by David Bruckner. It was released in theaters by Universal Pictures and stars Chase Williamson, Justin Welborn, and Hannah Fierman as Lily. Ain't It Cool News called it a "rock solid monster movie with a strong ensemble cast", Los Angeles Times hailed it a "clever and confident expansion of a terrific short", and Horror Freak News named SiREN as one of the "top horror movies of 2016".

Bishop sold his spec screenplay Lockdown at Franklin High in a bidding war to Sony Pictures with Michael Bay and Platinum Dunes attached to produce.

In 2020, it was announced on Deadline that Bishop would be directing the horror film The Sisters of Samhain with the producers of Final Destination.

== Filmography ==
- The Other Side (2006) – Director, writer, producer, editor
- Dance of the Dead (2008) – Director, producer, editor
- The Birds of Anger (2011) – Director, writer, producer, editor
- V/H/S: Viral (2014) – Director, writer, producer, editor, actor (segment "Dante the Great")
- Siren (2016) – Director, editor
- The Heretiks (2026) - Director, Producer, Editor
- The Sisters of Samhain (2028) – Director, producer
- Lockdown at Franklin High (2029) – Writer
