= Blair Redford =

American actor

- Born: David Blair Redford; 1982 or 1983 (age 43–44)
- Occupation: Actor
- Years active: 2004–present

David Blair Redford (born 1982 or 1983) is an American actor. He is known for his television roles such as Scotty Grainger on The Young and the Restless, Miguel Lopez-Fitzgerald on Passions, Ethan Whitehorse on The Lying Game, Tyler "Ty" Mendoza on Switched at Birth and Simon Waverly on Satisfaction and Thunderbird on The Gifted.

== Early life ==
Redford grew up in the suburb of Canton, Georgia and attended Sequoyah High School. He is of Irish, French, German and Native American descent. He worked for several summers in Georgia's Renaissance Festival performing and doing stunts, creating a pirate character named "Rusty Compass." He is an avid tennis player, and turned down scholarships upon graduating high school in order to act.

== Career ==
Redford got his start with a win in a Warner Bros. open call that granted him a seat as a team member of the WB Road Crew. After about a year and a half on the Road Crew, he moved to Los Angeles. After a short time there, he then landed the role of Scotty Grainger on the soap opera The Young and the Restless in July 2005, which he left in February 2006.

Redford later replaced Adrian Bellani in the role of the Latino character Miguel Lopez-Fitzgerald in the soap opera Passions from 2007 to 2008 when the show moved from NBC exclusively to DirectTV for its final season. Redford also landed the starring role of Nash Rambler in Gregg Bishop's horror-comedy film Dance of the Dead which was released by Sam Raimi's Ghost House Pictures and Lions Gate Entertainment.

Redford starred in The CW drama pilot Betwixt, which wasn't picked up to series, and also appeared in the third season of The CW's 90210 as a recurring character named Oscar. He played James, a Bumper Band member in the film Burlesque starring Cher and Christina Aguilera. In 2011, he appeared in five episodes of ABC Family's Switched at Birth as Tyler "Ty" Mendoza, then left the show to start filming for ABC Family's The Lying Game. He was in the series for two seasons before it was cancelled by the network. BuddyTV ranked him #17 on its list of "TV's Sexiest Men of 2011". He reprised his role in the second half of Switched at Birth's second season in summer 2013 and left to pursue other shows.

In September 2013, it was announced that Redford would guest star as Zach in the second season of Beauty & the Beast on The CW.

On March 19, 2014, it was reported that Redford had been cast in Satisfaction as Simon Waverly. The male escort drama series aired for two seasons on the USA Network. In 2017, he starred as John Proudstar / Thunderbird in the Marvel Studios series The Gifted. In July 2026, it was announced Redford would appear as a heavy recurring character on the 2027 reboot of the 1989 series, Baywatch.

== Filmography ==
=== Film ===
Year	Title	Role	Notes
2005	Slip	Peter	Short film
2006	The Other Side	Reaper #3	
2008	Dance of the Dead	Nash Rambler	
2008	The Day the Earth Stood Still	Army Fighter Pilot #1	
2010	Ugly, Strong and Dignified	The Duke	Short film
2010	Burlesque	James / Bumper Band Member	
2014	V/H/S: Viral	Himself	Segment: "Dante the Great"
2015	A Girl Like Grace	Billy	
2016	Siren	Drunk Guy	
2020	Goy	Paul Rosenberg	

=== Television ===
Year	Title	Role	Notes
2004	Blue Collar TV	Tim	Episode: "Vacations"
2005–2006	The Young and the Restless	Scotty Grainger	Regular cast, 39 episodes
2006	Voodoo Moon	Evil Young Man	Television film
2007	October Road	Ross St. Marie	Episode: "Tomorrow's So Far Away"
2007	Cane	Marcus	2 episodes
2007–2008	Passions	Miguel Lopez-Fitzgerald	Regular cast, 44 episodes
2008	Lincoln Heights	Miguel	Episode: "Prom Night"
2009	FlashForward	Joel	Episode: "No More Good Days"
2009	CSI: Miami	Troy Billings	Episode: "Bolt Action"
2010	Huge	Ryan Boone / Arturo	Episode: "Movie Night"
2010	90210	Oscar	Recurring role; 10 episodes
2010	Betwixt	Moth	Unsold television pilot
2011–2013	Switched at Birth	Tyler "Ty" Mendoza	Recurring role, 15 episodes
2011–2013	The Lying Game	Ethan Whitehorse	Main role, 30 episodes
2013	CSI: Crime Scene Investigation	Luke Holland	Episode: "Sheltered"
2013	Beauty & the Beast	Zach Hayes	Episode: "Reunion"
2014–2015	Satisfaction	Simon Waverly	Main role, 19 episodes
2015	The Red Road	Cody	2 episodes
2017–2019	The Gifted	John Proudstar / Thunderbird	Main cast
2024	Three Women	Will	Recurring role, 5 episodes

=== Video games ===
Year	Title	Role	Notes
2013	Beyond: Two Souls	Jay (voice)	
