= Jaimie Alexander =

American actress (born 1984)

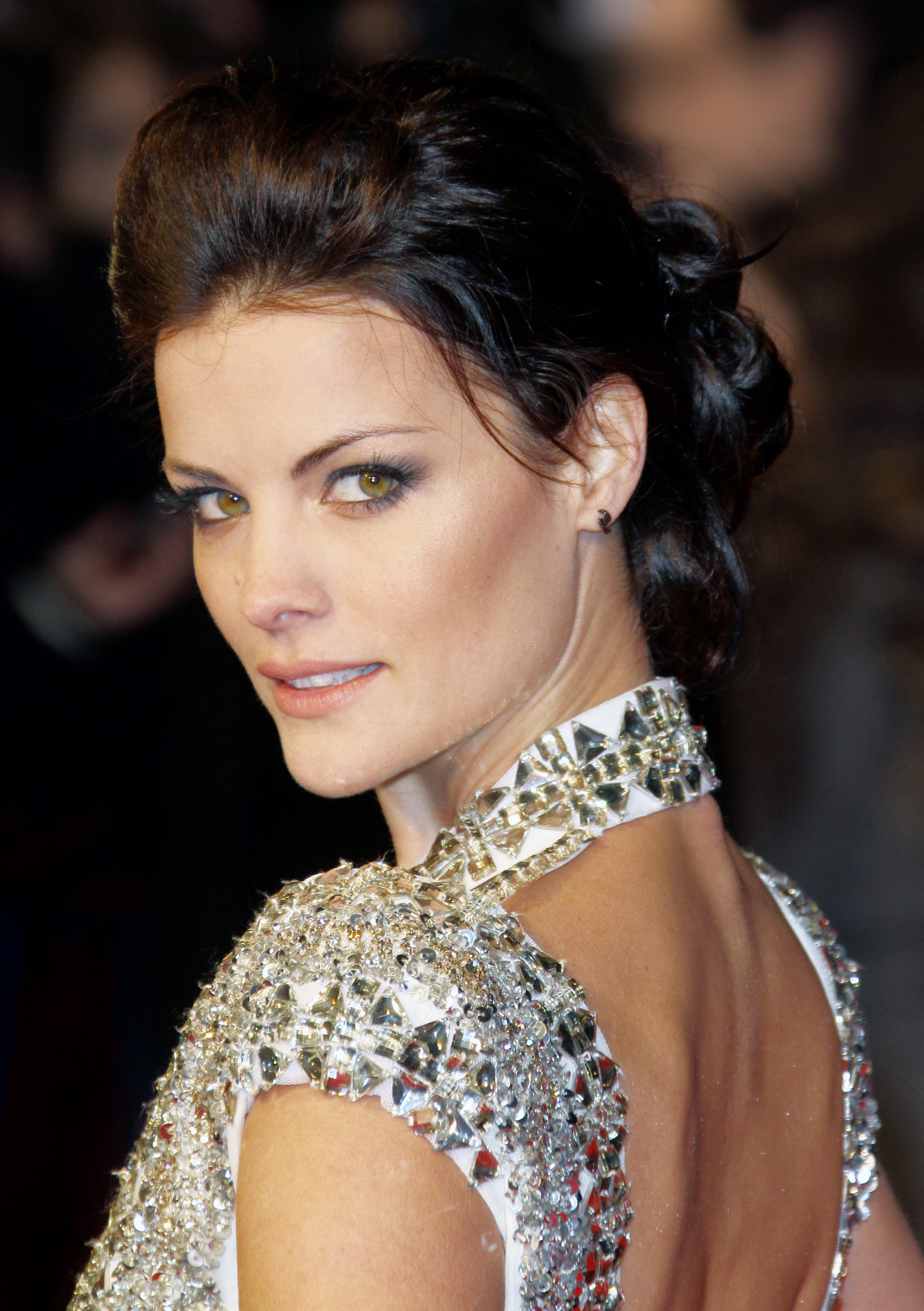
- Alexander in 2013
- Born: March 12, 1984 (age 42)
- Occupation: Actress
- Years active: 2003–present

Jaimie Alexander (born March 12, 1984), is an American actress. She is known for portraying Jessi on the TV series Kyle XY and Lady Sif in the Marvel Cinematic Universe films Thor (2011), Thor: The Dark World (2013), and Thor: Love and Thunder (2022), as well as the television series Agents of S.H.I.E.L.D. (2014–2015) and the Disney+ series Loki and What If?... (both 2021). From 2015 to 2020, she starred in the NBC series Blindspot.

== Early life ==
Jaimie Alexander has a brother. Alexander first got into acting in grade school, where she took theater for fun. Alexander stated that she was kicked out of theater when she was in high school because she could not sing, so she instead went into sports. When she was 17, she substituted for a friend at a meeting with a scouting agency and she met her manager, Randy James, who sent her some scripts. After her graduation from Colleyville Heritage High School, a year and a half later, she moved to Los Angeles to pursue her acting career.

== Career ==
Her career was launched in 2003, when she was cast in the leading role of Hanna Thompson in the low budget, award-winning film The Other Side. According to the movie's commentary, she was originally at the audition to help out by reading against the male actors, but the director Gregg Bishop decided to cast her in the leading role after hearing her perform the lines. Alexander's next role was in the movie Squirrel Trap where she played Sara, the love interest of the main character, David, who is a socially introverted genius portrayed by Keith Staley. This was soon followed by a guest appearance in It's Always Sunny in Philadelphia, where she portrayed a femme fatale in the role of Tammy, who through a combination of seduction and threats manipulates one of the main characters. She also has a small part in an episode of Standoff.

She appeared in the series Watch Over Me where she portrayed the character of Caitlin Porter. In 2006, she had her second lead role in the horror film Rest Stop where she portrayed Nicole Carrow, a girl who escapes from home and goes on a trip with her boyfriend, which is unexpectedly interrupted at a rest stop by a deranged serial killer. In 2007, she had her third lead role, also in a horror film. In Hallowed Ground she played Elizabeth Chambers, a girl stranded in a small town inhabited by a sect that plans to use her as a vessel for the rebirth of their founder.

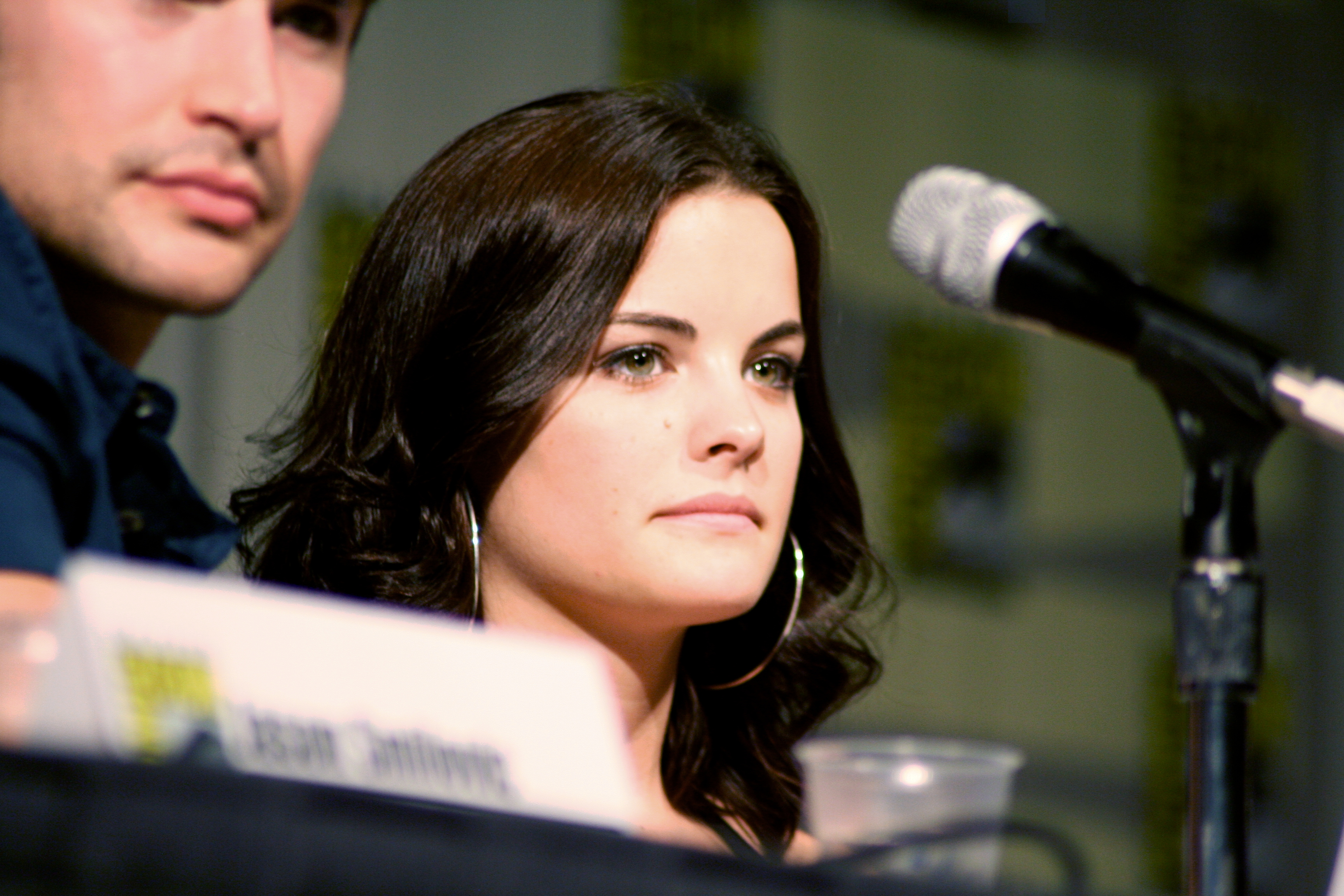
Alexander at the 2008 San Diego Comic Con

In 2007, she began starring in the ABC Family television show Kyle XY as Jessi, a troubled show-off with superhuman powers who is trying to find her way in the world, with increasing cooperation and eventual romance with her male counterpart Kyle. Her role generated a large fan base hoping to see a spin-off show for her character. She also has had guest roles on the show CSI: Miami where she played Jenna York, a flight attendant involved in a murder case; and in Bones where she played Molly Briggs, a student connected to the victim of the episode.

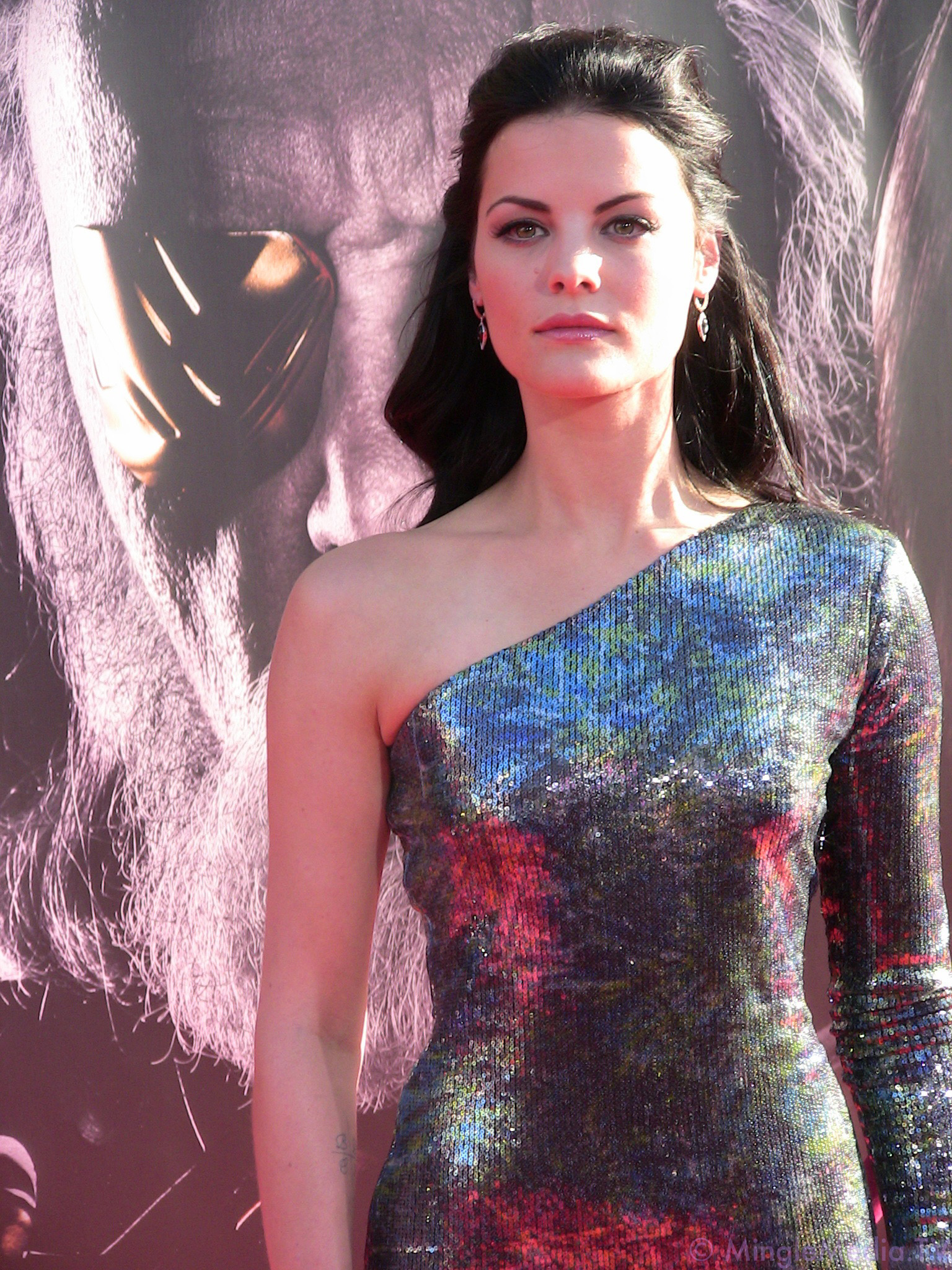
Alexander at the Thor premiere

In September 2009, Alexander was cast as Lady Sif in the live-action superhero film Thor, directed by Kenneth Branagh and released in May 2011. She reprised the role in the sequel Thor: The Dark World, released in November 2013. She reprised the role in two special crossover guest appearances in the TV series Agents of S.H.I.E.L.D., in episodes first aired on March 11, 2014, and March 10, 2015.

In July 2010, Alexander was cast in the independent comedy-drama film, Loosies co-starring Peter Facinelli and directed by Michael Corrente. In October 2010, Alexander joined the cast of Nurse Jackie in a sizeable story arc as Jackie's (Edie Falco) wild, immature sister-in-law, Tunie Peyton. In 2011, she joined the cast of Covert Affairs for three episodes of the second season.

Alexander appeared in the 2013 film Savannah directed by Annette Haywood-Carter, about Ward Allen (Jim Caviezel), a real-life early 1900s aristocrat who starts an unexpected partnership with Christmas Moultrie (Chiwetel Ejiofor), a freed slave. She portrayed deputy sheriff Sarah Torrance in The Last Stand, alongside Arnold Schwarzenegger.

In 2015, Alexander began starring as Jane Doe in the NBC series Blindspot. She made an uncredited cameo appearance as Sif in the TV series Loki in June 2021 and voiced the character in the TV series What If...?. She reprised the role in Thor: Love and Thunder (2022).

=== Other projects ===
She also appeared in a Matthew Perryman Jones music video of the song "Save You" released in September 2009.

In 2010, Alexander appeared in a web series for MSN entitled Ultradome produced by Milo Ventimiglia. In the series, Alexander portrayed Han Solo in battle against Indiana Jones for the title of best Harrison Ford character.

In 2011, Alexander reunited with writer/director Gregg Bishop for the film The Birds of Anger from NBCUniversal G4Films. The film was based on the best-selling mobile game, Rovio's Angry Birds, told in the style of the 1963 film The Birds by Alfred Hitchcock. In 2019, the film was selected by Robert Rodriguez to be featured on his El Rey Network.

== Personal life ==
Alexander began dating actor Peter Facinelli in 2012 after they met on the set of Loosies. They became engaged in March 2015. In February 2016, Alexander and Facinelli announced they had ended their engagement.

Also in 2012, Alexander suffered severe injuries when she slipped off a metal staircase during a rainy morning on the Thor: The Dark World set. The fall caused her to slip a disc in her thoracic spine and chip 11 of her vertebrae, as well as dislocate her left shoulder and tear a rhomboid on her right side. The injuries took her out of filming for a month.

Additionally, during the filming of Blindspot, Alexander experienced many injuries, including: ruptured C6 and C7 discs from being water boarded; herniated T3, T4, T8 and T9 discs; broken nose; dislocated right shoulder; broken right index finger; broken left foot; broken left two toes three times; broken right foot; broken right two toes; dislocated jaw; and other injuries that she was not allowed to disclose.

In March 2018, Alexander was hospitalized and underwent surgery after her appendix ruptured. She later recovered.

== Filmography ==
=== Film ===
Year	Title	Role	Notes
2004	Squirrel Trap	Sara	
2006	Rest Stop	Nicole Carrow	
2006	The Other Side	Hanna Thompson	
2007	Hallowed Ground	Liz Chambers	
2010	Love and Other Drugs	Carol	
2011	Thor	Sif	
2012	Loosies	Lucy	
2013	The Last Stand	Sarah Torrance	
2013	Collision	Taylor Dolan	
2013	Savannah	Lucy Stubbs	
2013	Thor: The Dark World	Sif	
2016	Broken Vows	Tara	
2018	London Fields	Hope	Filmed in 2013
2022	Last Seen Alive	Lisa Spann	
2022	Thor: Love and Thunder	Sif	Cameo
2022	The Minute You Wake Up Dead	Delaine Moore	

=== Television ===
Year	Title	Role	Notes
2005; 2025	It's Always Sunny in Philadelphia	Tammy	2 episodes
2006	Standoff	Barista	Episode: "Pilot"
2006–2007	Watch Over Me	Caitlin Porter	Main role
2007–2009	Kyle XY	Jessi XX	Main role (seasons 2–3)
2009	Bones	Molly Briggs	Episode: "The Beaver in the Otter"
2009	CSI: Miami	Jenna York	Episode: "Flight Risk"
2011	Nurse Jackie	Tunie Peyton	3 episodes
2011	Covert Affairs	Reva Kline	2 episodes
2011	The Birds of Anger	Annie	Short
2012	Perception	Nikki Atkins	Episode: "Messenger"
2014	Under the Gunn	Herself / judge	Episode: "Superhero Fashion"
2014–2015	Agents of S.H.I.E.L.D.	Lady Sif	2 episodes
2015–2020	Blindspot	Jane Doe / Remi Briggs / Alice Kruger	Main role
2015	The Brink	Gail Sweet	Recurring role
2017	Talking with Chris Hardwick	Herself	
2021	Loki	Lady Sif	Episode: "The Nexus Event"
2021	What If...?	Lady Sif	Voice; 2 episodes

=== Video game ===
Year	Title	Voice role
2011	Thor: God of Thunder	Lady Sif

== Awards and nominations ==
Year	Award	Category	Nominated work	Result
2008	Saturn Awards	Best Supporting Actress on Television	Kyle XY	Nominated
2011	Scream Awards	Best Supporting Actress	Thor	Nominated
2011	Scream Awards	Breakout Performance – Female	Thor	Nominated
2017	10th Action Icon Awards	Action Iconic Award	Blindspot	Won
