= Palmetto Pointe =

2005 television series

- Genre: Teen drama
- Created by: John Kearns Jr.
- Starring: Tim Woodward Jr.; Brent Lovell; Sarah Edwards; Madison Weidberg; Will Triplett; Amanda Baker
- Country of origin: United States
- Original language: English
- No. of seasons: 1
- No. of episodes: 7 (2 unaired)

Production
- Executive producer: John Kearns Jr.
- Editor: Justin Nathanson
- Production companies: Sky Entertainment Group; Kearns Entertainment

Original release
- Network: i: Independent Television
- Release: August 28 – October 16, 2005

Palmetto Pointe is an American teen drama television series that debuted during PAX-TV's transition to i: Independent Television. The series first aired on August 28, 2005, with its last episode airing on October 16, 2005. It was the first television series shot on location in Charleston, South Carolina, where the series was set.

The series was presented as a teen drama.

== Overview ==
The program had a sponsorship deal with Cheerwine, whose soft drinks were shown onscreen in every episode. It was cancelled due to viewership so low that it "barely registered".

Palmetto Pointe was a creative and financial failure, marred by poor production values. It was also derided by some of its few viewers as a clone of both Dawson's Creek and One Tree Hill, series which shot in Wilmington, North Carolina and established that city's reputation as a filming location. Seven episodes of the series were produced, but only five aired. It ended in bankruptcy, with the cast and crew failing to receive their final paychecks.

== Cast ==
- Timothy Woodward Jr. as Tristan Sutton (credited as Tim Woodward)
- Brent Lovell as Logan Jones
- Sarah Edwards as Millison Avery
- Madison Weidberg as Lacy Timberline
- Will Triplett as Josh Davidson
- Amanda Baker as Callah O'Connell
- John Wesley Shipp guest-starred on an episode, playing Michael Jones.

== Production ==
The show is Timothy Woodward Jr.'s debut in the industry.
