= V/H/S: Viral =

2014 American film

- Theatrical release poster
- Directed by: Marcel Sarmiento ("Vicious Circles"); Gregg Bishop ("Dante the Great"); Nacho Vigalondo ("Parallel Monsters"); Justin Benson and Aaron Moorhead ("Bonestorm"); Todd Lincoln ("Gorgeous Vortex") (Note: "Gorgeous Vortex", written and directed by Todd Lincoln, was cut from the final film, but included on the extras in the home release.)
- Written by: Marcel Sarmiento; T.J. Cimfel; David White; Gregg Bishop; Nacho Vigalondo; Justin Benson; Todd Lincoln
- Produced by: Gary Binkow; Brad Miska
- Production companies: Bloody Disgusting; The Collective; Haxan Films
- Distributed by: Magnet Releasing
- Release dates: October 23, 2014 (VOD); November 21, 2014 (US)
- Running time: 81 minutes
- Country: United States
- Languages: English; Spanish
- Box office: $82,409

V/H/S: Viral is a 2014 American found footage horror anthology film produced by Bloody Disgusting, The Collective and Haxan Films. The sequel to V/H/S/2 (2013), it is the third installment in the V/H/S franchise and features three found footage segments linked together by a fourth frame narrative written and directed by Nacho Vigalondo, Marcel Sarmiento, Gregg Bishop, Justin Benson and Aaron Scott Moorhead. An additional segment was filmed, written and directed by Todd Lincoln, but was cut since it did not fit with the overall theme of the film.

The film was released on demand on October 23, 2014, and made a limited theatrical release in the United States on November 21, 2014. It grossed $82,409 in box office and $295,389 in home sales. A fourth film, V/H/S/94, was released on September 26, 2021.

== Plot ==
The film is presented as an anthology of three short horror films, built into a frame narrative which acts as its own fourth short horror film. Each short film is linked together with the concept of found footage as each segment is from VHS tapes that went viral after being uploaded to social media from Kyle's laptop. (Note: As depicted in V/H/S/2 (2013).)

=== "Vicious Circles" (frame narrative) — Prologue ===
- Directed by Marcel Sarmiento
- Written by T.J. Cimfel, David White and Marcel Sarmiento

The frame narrative focuses on Kevin, an amateur videographer who constantly shoots footage of his girlfriend Iris to cope with his abusive grandmother. She claims to enjoy it, but Iris soon grows annoyed with Kevin's obsession with filming her.

That night, an ice cream truck in a high speed car chase arrives in the neighborhood, with Kevin witnessing the live broadcast on television. He sees the opportunity to create a viral video of the chase, but is too late to shoot footage as the truck speeds past his house. Iris then receives a mysterious video call and wanders outside in a daze. The truck runs over a police officer who had been telling Kevin to back away from the road.

Kevin notices that Iris has suddenly disappeared and chases after the truck when images of a panicking Iris are broadcast to his cell phone. Meanwhile, people in the neighborhood begin to receive the same images on their own phones, turning them violently insane.

=== "Dante the Great" ===
- Directed and written by Gregg Bishop

This segment is framed partially as an investigative documentary.

Trailer park resident and untalented illusionist John McMullen mysteriously discovers a cloak that was once owned by Harry Houdini. He learns that wearing the cloak grants him the power to perform actual magic and takes on the stage name "Dante the Great" to perform his newfound abilities in front of large audiences, becoming immensely famous.

When his power appears to fail one night, John learns that the cloak requires regular human sacrifices to work, and thus hires a series of assistants to feed the cloak, videotaping the deaths. He uses his powers to summon and kill Clay Bowland, the abusive boyfriend of his latest assistant, Scarlett Kay. She discovers John's tape collection in his dressing room, hidden inside a secret compartment disguised as a circuit breaker. After she alerts the police, a SWAT team enters John's theater while he is doing an interview with a documentary crew in order to arrest him. However, John uses his powers to escape custody and summon Scarlett from the police station where she's being interrogated. The documentary crew keep filming, and in the midst of their confrontation, the SWAT team re-enters the building and attempt to arrest John once again, but he manages to kill them all with his magic.

Scarlett and John duel over the cloak, but the former is overpowered. Before John can kill her, Scarlett uses a rope trick he taught her to immobilize him, prompting the cloak to devour him instead. After recovering from the ordeal, Scarlett burns the cloak, only to find it hanging on her closet door that night. As she investigates, a pair of giant, shadowed arms reach out from inside the cloak and grab her as the footage ends.

=== "Vicious Circles" — First interlude ===
Kevin and the police continue chasing the truck. Some teenagers attempt to film the chase from atop a nearby bridge, with one of them staring at his phone in a trance while his nose bleeds. Another teenager slips and falls from the bridge when he gets too close to the edge. He lands on the road and is killed when a vehicle runs over him.

Kevin is halted by a group of cyclists, but they end up helping him pursue the truck. During the chase, the lead cyclist gets caught on the truck's bumper, has his feet shredded to the bone, and is ultimately killed.

=== "Parallel Monsters" ===
- Directed and written by Nacho Vigalondo

Spanish inventor Alfonso works late on his newest project: a prototype interdimensional portal. When he activates it, the portal opens to reveal what appears to be his garage. Alfonso witnesses a copy of himself looking back at him, revealing that the portal has successfully opened a gateway to a parallel universe.

Overcome by curiosity, the two Alfonsos greet each other and discover that they appear to be completely identical. Both agree to trade places and cross through the portal with their own cameras to explore each other's universes for fifteen minutes. The original Alfonso explores his parallel house and meets the parallel copy of his wife Marta, who introduces him to two men both named Oriol. In the living room, a pornographic snuff film plays on the television and a sack of organs is displayed in the center.

When the parallel Marta prompts who she believes is her husband to perform a Satanic ritual with the Orioles, his confusion prompts the latter two to leave. When he is shocked by droning noises, Alfonso leaves the house and sees a large blimp with an inverted cross that blares demonic chanting flying above it, revealing that the two universes hold differing dominant religions. As he records the blimp, Alfonso is confronted by the Orioles. Their eyes and mouths turn bright red as they capture him, and one of them takes his pants off to reveal a fanged penis-like creature protruding from his crotch.

Meanwhile, in the original universe, the parallel Alfonso discovers the original Marta asleep and lustfully takes photos of her before unveiling his own monstruous genitalia, scaring Marta awake. In the parallel universe, the original Alfonso stabs one of the Orioles' penises with a screwdriver and flees back to the house. As she questions what happened, the parallel Marta grows aroused and takes off her robe to reveal that she has a similarly fanged vagina. Alfonso punches her out of fear and flees back to the portal, where the parallel Alfonso, covered in blood, stabs him and tries to returns to his universe.

The parallel Marta, mistaking her actual husband for the impostor, knocks him down and lets her vagina devour him to punish him for breaking the parallel universe's law on domestic violence, just as the original Alfonso closes the portal. A blood-covered Marta appears and, also mistakenly believing that her husband attacked her, furiously stabs Alfonso to death as the footage ends.

=== "Vicious Circles" — Second interlude ===
Kevin continues chasing the truck as it repeatedly circles the neighborhood, begging the police to help him save Iris. Meanwhile, a group of Hispanic gangbangers are holding a barbecue to celebrate one of their own being released from prison. One guest notices a police helicopter following the chase and incorrectly assumes that his girlfriend has turned him in.

Suddenly, as the radio abruptly changes frequency and begins playing opera music, the offended guest stabs the guest of honor's dog with a skewer. Enraged, the guest of honor proceeds to murder him and almost everyone else at the party by stabbing them with forks. As Kevin and the truck pass, a gas tank ruptures in the chaos and explodes, setting the neighborhood on fire.

=== "Bonestorm" ===
- Directed by Justin Benson and Aaron Scott Moorhead
- Written by Justin Benson

Los Angeles skateboarders Jason and Danny perform various stunts in the hopes of making an epic skateboard video. Their videographer Taylor pushes them into increasingly dangerous circumstances to injure or kill themselves so he can sell the aftermath as a snuff film. After getting kicked out of the local skate park for starting a fight, Taylor suggests that the duo continue filming in Tijuana, remembering that he heard about a prime skating location for them to finish their video. The duo call out to their friend Shaun, who joins them in their trip to Mexico by paying everything with his father's credit card.

After enjoying themselves with the local color and buying fireworks, the quartet subsequently become lost and run into a mysterious woman. Once they find an old flood control channel, Taylor encourages them to perform more stunts. When Danny injures himself and bleeds on a large pentagram drawn on the ground, his blood quickly boils as the woman they met earlier suddenly appears.

As Taylor introduces himself and offers to film her, the woman tears his arm off and a group of cloaked cultists, who were using the channel for demonic worship, attack the group for trespassing. In the ensuing fight, Shaun is fatally stabbed and bleeds out while Taylor is set on fire by exposure to the cultists' blood, which spontaneously ignites. When it appears that the cultists are all dead, a monstruous roar sounds and they rise as reanimated skeletons to mount a second attack. Jason and Danny manage to use the fireworks they bought earlier to destroy the skeletons.

Seeing an opportunity to escape, the duo proceed to skate back toward the border as the creature the cultists were summoning appears from a nearby storm drain, picking up the wounded Taylor and devouring him. His camera captures a view of the creature's throat as the footage ends.

=== "Vicious Circles" — Third interlude ===
At this point, a citywide warning is given on the news broadcasting the chase, warning people that several fires have broken out across Los Angeles and people have been killing each other after witnessing strange images on their phones. Kevin, still chasing the truck, tries to get a taxi to stop, but the driver refuses because he is helping his porn director friend film a striptease with a young woman in the backseat.

Suddenly, the woman pulls a gun on the director, revealing that he had previously been sold pornographic footage of her by her ex-boyfriend, and the exposure incidentally ruined her life. She forces him to strip by threatening to shoot his crotch until the director fights back. All three are killed when a police car flips through the air and crushes the taxi.

=== "Vicious Circles" — Epilogue ===
As dawn breaks, Kevin finally catches up to the truck, which sits inside the L.A. River, where he had been filming Iris near at the beginning of the film, body parts strewn on the ground around it. He rushes to the vehicle when he hears Iris' voice, but finds only a pair of disembodied hands duct taped to the steering wheel. When Kevin examines the back, he finds several televisions stacked atop each other and a laptop that is uploading the videos to social media.

Iris appears on one of the screens and demands that Kevin upload his footage of the chase to broadcasters everywhere. He refuses and tries to explain that the videos are driving people all over the city insane, but when Iris begins to brutally mutilate herself, Kevin relents and pushes a button to upload the footage. With the deed done, Iris' image taunts and laughs at him as he exits the truck, discovering that Iris has actually been dead the entire time after finding her corpse slumped against the truck, a phone stuck in her mouth.

Kevin retrieves the phone and finds that it is in selfie mode, mindlessly gazing at the screen as his nose starts to bleed. As Beethoven's Ninth Symphony's sounds, the closing shot of the film is a view of Los Angeles skyline with fires burning throughout the city, smoke billowing into the sky, lights flickering on and off, and news helicopters circling overhead, indicating that the uploaded videos have already driven thousands insane, thus fulfilling the grander threat introduced in the previous films, and the frame narrative finally ends as the whole city becomes haywire.

== Cast ==
=== "Vicious Circles" ===
- Patrick Lawrie as Kevin
- Emilia Ares as Iris
- Steve Berens as Cop
- Stephanie Silver as Eva
- Angela Garcia as Carolina
- Gary Sugarman as Lewis
- Celia K. Milius as Grandma
- Garrett Bales as Spooked Guy
- Val Vega as Gabriela
- Jorge Marquez as Carlos
- Chad Guernero as Uncle Alberto
- Noelle Ann Mabry as Lulu
- Kenny Burns as Taxi Driver

=== "Dante the Great" ===
- Justin Welborn as Dante the Great
- Emmy Argo as Scarlett Kay
- Dan Caudill as Detective Hughes
- Stephen Caudill as SWAT Leader
- Nathan Mobley as Theatrical Critic
- John Curran as Blackstone
- Susan Williams as Dante's Mom
- Gregg Bishop as Documentary Director
- Michael Aaron Milligan as Clay
- Matt Peevy as SWAT Officer
- Randy McDowell as Harry Houdini
- Carrie Keagan as herself
- Jessica Luza as Girl in Shower
- Greyson Chadwick as Houdini Girl #1
- Amanda Baker as Houdini Girl #2
- Amanda Hall as Magician Assistant #3
- Blair Redford as himself

=== "Parallel Monsters" ===
- Gustavo Salmerón as Alfonso
- Marian Álvarez as Martha
- Xavi Daura as Oriol (1)
- Esteban Navarro as Oriol (2)

=== "Bonestorm" ===
- Nick Blanco as Danny
- Chase Newton as Jason
- Shane Brady as Taylor
- Cristián Toledo as Shaun
- David Castro as Chanting Man
- Angel Sala-Belen as Skull Face
- Jawed El Berni as Skull Face
- Michael Flores as Skull Face
- Alexandra Besore as Dark Fairy Woman
- Natalia Ferreiro as Creepy Woman
- Jonez Jones as Bone Face
- Conrad K. Pratt as Bone Face
- John Oravec as Hobo in the Park

== Release ==
The film was released on demand on October 23, 2014, and was released in select theaters on November 21. The home-release on Blu-ray and DVD was on February 17, 2015, through Magnet Releasing, including an unused segment "Gorgeous Vortex" directed by Todd Lincoln. The film premiered on Netflix on March 20, 2015.

== Reception ==
On the review aggregator website Rotten Tomatoes, 33% of 33 critics' reviews are positive, with an average rating of 4.1/10. The website's consensus reads: "V/H/S: Viral is hardly a sensation as it cycles through the franchise's least frightening vignettes yet." Metacritic, which uses a weighted average, assigned the film a score of 38 out of 100, based on 12 critics, indicating "generally unfavorable" reviews.

Peter Debruge of Variety described the film as "three playful yet thoroughly disposable experiments in short-form p.o.v. cinema". Frank Scheck of The Hollywood Reporter wrote, "Lacking the originality of the first film and the superior entries of the second, V/H/S Viral spirals downwards towards the same sort of obsolescence as the home video format that provides its title." A. A. Dowd of The A.V. Club rated it D+ and called it "slapdash and ineffectual". Jordan Hoffman of The Guardian rated it 1/5 stars and wrote, "Besides one bright spot involving razor-sharp genitals, this horror compilation is bereft of thrills, scares or creativity."

Shawn Macomber of Fangoria rated it 3/4 stars and wrote that the change in tone from previous entries in the film series will alienate some fans but is a "welcome breather". Brad McHargue of Dread Central rated it 4/5 stars and wrote, "The shorts that comprise V/H/S Viral are inventive enough to make up for the blunder that is Sarmiento's wraparound, even if each one breaks the found footage 'rules' in egregious ways." Luke Owen of Flickering Myth writes “Dante the Great has some amazing visuals, a wickedly fun fight scene and an amazing style. Both Vigalondo's Parallel Monsters and Bishop's Dante the Great deserve to be in a much better anthology horror movie.”

== Prequel ==
In June 2020, it was announced that a fourth installment of the V/H/S franchise was in development, titled V/H/S/94 and written by David Bruckner. V/H/S/94 had its world premiere at Fantastic Fest on September 26, 2021, and opened to positive critical reviews, with the initial reactions being that it was a "return to form" for the series.

== See also ==
- List of ghost films
