= Sarah Habel =

American actress

- Education: Michigan State University (BA)
- Occupation: Actress
- Years active: 2007–present

Sarah Habel is an American actress. She is best known for playing the roles of Daphne Glover in the MTV television series Underemployed and Geraldine Grundy in The CW television series Riverdale.

== Early life ==
Habel attended Michigan State University where she received her Bachelor of Arts in Theater in 2004.

== Career ==
After graduating from university Habel pursued theater in London and New York City as well as performing with the Wild Swan Children's Theater. Habel made her movie debut in Drew Barrymore's Whip It alongside Elliot Page.

== Filmography ==
=== Film ===
Year	Title	Role	Notes
2007	Beginning of Grief	Emily	Short film
2009	The Butterfly Effect 3: Revelations	Elizabeth Brown	
2009	Whip It	Corbi	
2009	American Virgin	Becca Curtzman	
2010	Unrequited	Jessica Morgan	
2011	Red & Blue Marbles	Flight Attendant	
2011	Hostel: Part III	Kendra	
2013	Warren	Emma Monarch	
2015	Night of the Living Dead: Darkest Dawn	Judy	
2017	Atomica	Abby Dixon	

=== Television ===
Year	Title	Role	Notes
2009	The Beast	Lucy Platko	Season 1, Episode 1 & 2
2010	The Deep End	Erin Conway	Season 1, Episode 1
2010	CSI: NY	Sarah Cates	Season 6, Episode 16
2010	Cold Case	Felicia Grant	Season 7, Episode 21
2010	Party Down	Colette	Season 2, Episode 5
2012	Hawaii Five-0	Amanda Chase	Season 2, Episode 16
2012	Dark Wall	Chloe	Season 1, Episode 4
2012–2013	Underemployed	Daphne Glover	Main role
2014	Rush	Eve	Main role
2017, 2022–2023	Riverdale	Geraldine Grundy	Recurring role; 12 episodes
