= Buck Wild =

- Directed by: Tyler Glodt
- Written by: Matthew Albrecht; Tyler Glodt
- Produced by: Matthew Albrecht; Stacey Crawford; Tyler Glodt; Christian Sosa; Taylor Thompson
- Starring: Matthew Albrecht; Jarrod Pistilli; Dru Lockwood; Isaac Harrison; Meg Cionni; Joe Stevens
- Cinematography: Tod Campbell
- Edited by: Tyler Glodt; Lynel Moore
- Music by: Joel Thompson
- Production company: Conation Films
- Distributed by: Millennium Entertainment
- Release dates: April 2013 (Dallas Film Festival); March 18, 2014 (United States)
- Running time: 96 minutes
- Country: United States
- Language: English

Buck Wild is a zombie comedy horror film directed by Tyler Glodt, written by Glodt and producer Matthew Albrecht, and starring Albrecht, Jarrod Pistilli, Dru Lockwood, and Isaac Harrison as four friends who must face zombies on their hunting trip in rural Texas. It premiered at the Dallas International Film Festival in April 2013. The film was shot in 2011 in Goliad County, Texas, United States. Buck Wild won the Best of the Fest award at the Hill Country Film Festival in May 2013.

== Plot ==
When their originally planned outing is cancelled, four friends go on a hunting trip in Texas. They include Craig, a straitlaced man; Jerry, a mysterious relative of Craig's from New York; Tom, a nerd; and Lance, a hedonist. When they arrive, they discover that a chupacabra has bitten their guide Clyde, and, unknown to all, he has begun to slowly turn into a zombie. As Clyde shows the friends their cabin, Lance and Candy, Clyde's daughter, make out in the next room. Clyde warns them not to cross onto the property of Billy Ray, a local gangster, and, discovering Lance and Candy, angrily leaves with his daughter. Later that night, Craig reveals that he intends to marry his girlfriend, and Lance behaves strangely; Jerry tells Craig that Lance and Craig's girlfriend have been having an affair, but Craig refuses to believe it.

While out hunting, Craig is horrified when he accidentally shoots Clyde, but, after Clyde survives several attempts by Jerry to put him down, Jerry insists that Clyde has obviously become a zombie. Unconvinced, Craig insists they take Clyde back to town. Along the way, they are stopped by Officer Shipley, who demands to see the tags on their kill. As the others panic, Jerry knocks Shipley unconscious despite their objections, only to find that Clyde has disappeared when they check their truck. Tom leaves on his own, and the others return to their cabin. There, Candy seduces Lance in the shed. Once Lance realizes that she has turned into a zombie, he attempts to escape and is bitten. Jerry insists that they shoot Lance in the brain, but Craig once again refuses and locks Lance in the bathroom.

When they receive a desperate call for help from Tom, Jerry goes to rescue him from Billy Ray's gang, who have been sexually humiliating him for fun. Tom and Jerry bond over their attempts to escape from and defeat Billy Ray's gang and the zombie townspeople. Meanwhile, Lance escapes from the bathroom and attacks Craig; however, once Lance eats his cannabis-laced brownies, he becomes more mellow and attempts to help Craig work through his feelings of inferiority. Once the drug effects wear off, Lance reverts to his bestial nature, and Craig, now feeling more assertive, kills Lance with a shot to the head. Tom and Jerry arrive back at the cabin, and they attempt to work out a plan, as Jerry forgot to refill their truck's gas tank. Before they can escape, Jerry accidentally wounds Tom, who is then dragged off by the zombies and killed.

Craig and Jerry are about to give up when they hear Shipley arrive. Shipley, who does not understand their warnings, dies when zombies surround and eviscerate him. Craig and Jerry run to his cruiser, and a zombie Tom begs them not to leave without him. As Craig awkwardly apologizes to Tom, Jerry hotwires the car, and they escape. On their way, they strike a deer, and Jerry remarks that it was a clean kill. Having finally killed a deer, they agree that the hunting trip was a success.

== Cast ==
- Matthew Albrecht as Craig Thompson
- Jarrod Pistilli as Jerry
- Dru Lockwood as Tom Alexander
- Isaac Harrison as Lance
- Mark Ford as Billy Ray
- Meg Cionni as Candy
- Joe Stevens as Clyde
- Tyler Glodt as Officer Shipley
- Nolan keith (actor) Larry Moody

== Release ==
Buck Wild premiered at the Dallas International Film Festival in April 2013. It was released on home video on March 18, 2014.

== Reception ==
Lizzie Duncan of HorrorNews.Net wrote, "Whilst there were definitely some scenes that gave away the amateur status of this film, on the whole I thought that it was well made and well edited."
