= Surviving Suburbia =

- Genre: Sitcom
- Created by: Kevin Abbott
- Starring: Bob Saget; Cynthia Stevenson; G. Hannelius; Jared Kusnitz
- Composer: Adam Gorgoni
- Country of origin: United States
- Original language: English
- No. of seasons: 1
- No. of episodes: 13

Production
- Executive producers: Mindy Schultheis; Michael Hanel
- Camera setup: Multi-camera
- Running time: 30 minutes (20–22 min. without commercials)
- Production companies: Acme Productions; NestEgg Productions; Media Rights Capital

Original release
- Network: ABC
- Release: April 6 – August 7, 2009

Surviving Suburbia is an American sitcom television series starring Bob Saget and Cynthia Stevenson that aired on ABC from April 6 to August 7, 2009. The series originally aired at 9:30 PM Eastern/8:30 PM Central following Dancing with the Stars, before moving to Fridays at 8:30 PM Eastern/7:30 PM Central for its remaining episodes. It was the first program starring Saget to air on ABC since he left America's Funniest Home Videos in 1997.

On August 8, 2009, ABC Entertainment President Steve McPherson announced that Surviving Suburbia, along with The Goode Family, had officially been cancelled due to low ratings.

== Premise ==
A half-hour comedy dubbed a male version of Roseanne, Surviving Suburbia focused on a father named Steve Patterson (Bob Saget), his wife Anne (Cynthia Stevenson), and their two children, Henry and Courtney. The Pattersons lead ordinary, uneventful lives until their new next-door neighbors begin causing several problems, turning their suburban lifestyle upside-down.

== Cast ==
- Bob Saget as Steve Patterson
- Cynthia Stevenson as Anne Patterson
- Jared Kusnitz as Henry Patterson
- G. Hannelius as Courtney Patterson
- Jere Burns as Dr. Jim
- Dan Cortese as Onno
- Lyndsey Jolly as Jenna
- Lorna Scott as Monica
- Melissa Peterman as Mrs. Muncie

== Programming history ==
In 2008, The CW announced plans to air the comedy as part of their Sunday night programming block with Media Rights Capital or MRC. The series was set to air November 2, and 13 episodes were taped.

When the MRC block started, it faced very low ratings against other networks (especially with Fox's Animation Domination). After only a few weeks the CW pulled the entire block and announced that the status of Suburbia's air date was TBA. An additional factor in scheduling changes may have been the fact that Media Rights Capital had been unable to keep up with the set production schedule and had begun running out of episodes. CW never released any announcements concerning the series' air date.

On February 6, 2009, ABC, which had previously aired two shows with Bob Saget: Full House and America's Funniest Home Videos, announced that it would be airing Surviving Suburbia starting April 6.

When the first episode aired, it garnered 12.16 million viewers and 3.2/8 million viewers in the 18–49 demographics but ratings kept dropping and it lost a lot of the audience of its lead-in, Dancing with the Stars.

Surviving Suburbia returned to the 8:00PM Eastern/7:00PM Central slot on Friday, June 12 and finished its first and only season on Friday, August 7.

== Episodes ==
No.	Title	Directed by	Written by	Original release date	Prod. code
1	"Hero"	Emile Levisetti	Don Beck	April 6, 2009	002
Steve is forced to house sit for Onno and accidentally causes a fire. To cover up for his mistake, he claims to have stopped the fire. His daughter and neighbors praise him as being a hero, but his conscience ends up getting the best of him.
2	"Project Run Away"	Andrew D. Weyman	Danny Zuker	April 13, 2009	003
Steve challenges Courtney's teacher regarding a homework assignment. Anne must stand up for Steve when his parenting skills are questioned due to an inappropriate e-mail. Meanwhile, Henry makes it a mission to discover who is the father of Rhonda's children.
3	"DMV"	Robbie Countryman	Vince Calandra	April 20, 2009	004
Steve has a plan of using Monica's scooter to cut the line at the DMV, but his plan backfires. Meanwhile, Onno asks Anne to take Jenna to the gynecologist but when Jenna tells Anne her true reasons for going, Anne is put in a compromising position.
4	"40 Days"	Andrew D. Weyman	Claudia Lonow	April 27, 2009	005
After learning about a book which describes how intimacy can be achieved with 40 days of sex, Steve talks Anne into joining a book club so that she'll read it. His plan does not go accordingly when Anne admits she has no confidence in their current relationship. Meanwhile, Courtney loses an important gift from Jenna and must confess her mistake.
5	"Burn, Bougainvillea, Burn"	Andrew D. Weyman	Kevin Abbot	May 27, 2009	001
As Steve and Anne get to know their neighbors, things aren't as friendly as they seem. Note: Despite being aired as Episode 5, the plot of this episode (in which Steve and Anne first meet their new neighbors, Onno and his daughter Jenna) clearly indicates that it was intended to come before Episode 1 in the series.
6	"If the Shoe Fits, Steal It"	Andrew D. Weyman	Claudia Lonow	June 12, 2009	006
Steve falsely accuses a mother at school of stealing his daughter Courtney's shoes. Henry hides his SAT score from Anne.
7	"Dirty Stevie"	Andrew D. Weyman	Bob Myer	June 19, 2009	007
Onno gives Steve a handgun and Steve likes the power that comes with it. Anne on the other hand doesn't want that gun in her house, until Steve uses that power with Henry, she sees the new macho-man in Steve and she likes it. Meanwhile, Anne has to deal with Monica after she sends her a bill of the food that Henry has eaten at her house.
8	"The Game of Life"	Andrew D. Weyman	Vince Calandra & Claudia Lonow	June 26, 2009	008
Steve talks about his concerns for the economy during family game night.
9	"Nothing for Money"	Leonard R. Garner Jr.	Kevin Abbott & Pat Bullard	July 10, 2009	009
Steve asks Anne to get a real job instead of volunteering.
10	"School Council"	Robbie Countryman	Vince Calandra	July 17, 2009	010
Steve learns something about Henry life.
11	"Three End Tables"	Andrew D. Weyman	Vince Calandra	July 24, 2009	011
Anne and Steve have trouble about a table mistake. Courtney and Jenna have conflict about Henry.
12	"Desperate Housewife"	Robbie Countryman	Donald R. Beck	July 31, 2009	012
Steve admits that a neighbor, who is going through a divorce, flirted with him.
13	"No Reception"	Andrew D. Weyman	Pat Bullard	August 7, 2009	013
Steve tries to motivate Annie to break away from her manipulative mother after her parents abuse the new cell phones they give them; Henry is counseled after he reprimands Rhonda for glamorizing teen pregnancy in front of Courtney.

== Weekly ratings ==
#	Episode	18–49	Viewers (m)	Rating	Share
1	Hero	3.2/8	12.16	7.2	11
2	Project Run Away	2.8/7	10.69	6.3	10
3	DMV	2.6/6	10.86	6.6	10
4	40 Days	2.4/6	9.91	6.0	9
5	Burn, Bougainvillea, Burn	1.0/3	2.83	1.9	4
6	If the Shoe Fits, Steal It	0.6/3	2.87	1.3	3
7	Dirty Stevie	0.6/3	2.59	1.8	4
8	The Game of Life	0.7/3	2.76	1.7	4
9	Nothing for Money	0.5/2	2.23	1.8	4
10	School Council	0.7/3	2.62	1.7	4
11	Three End Tables	0.6/3	2.42	TBA	TBA
12	Desperate Housewife	0.6/3	2.60	1.6	4
13	No Reception	0.7/3	2.73	1.8	4

== International airings ==
The program premiered in October 2009 in Greece on Greece's Fox Life. In Portugal, it aired on Fox Life.
