= Doll Graveyard =

- DVD cover
- Directed by: Charles Band
- Screenplay by: August White
- Story by: Charles Band
- Produced by: Charles Band; Jeremy Gordon; Jethro Rothe-Kushel; Joe Dain
- Starring: Jared Kusnitz; Hannah Marks; Ken Lyle
- Cinematography: Tom Calloway
- Edited by: Danny Draven
- Music by: District 78
- Distributed by: Full Moon Entertainment
- Release date: October 11, 2005
- Running time: 71 minutes
- Language: English

Doll Graveyard is a 2005 horror film released by Full Moon Features and directed by Charles Band. It involves four haunted dolls that are possessed by the spirit of a young girl and come to life with murderous intentions.

== Plot ==
In 1911 a little girl, Sophia, is accidentally killed when her abusive father Cyril forces her to bury her beloved dolls, an African warrior, a German soldier, a porcelain girl, and a samurai, in their home's back yard. He hides the crime by burying her with the dolls, unaware that his gold pocket watch was buried along with her.

Decades later in 2005, the same house is now occupied by Lester Filbrook and his two children, Guy and Deedee. Guy uncovers the samurai doll while doing some yardwork. The pocket watch is found by Lester, who then leaves for a date. While Lester is gone, DeeDee throws a party that includes two of Guy's bullies. Upon arrival they tie up Guy and break one of his dolls, angering Sophia's spirit. She then possesses Samurai and digs up the other dolls. She then uses the dolls to terrorize the teens and kill both bullies before possessing Guy.

Lester arrives home just as a possessed Guy breaks a vase. This causes Lester to react as if he were in turn possessed by Cyril. He is broken out of his trance when the dolls all attack him and Lester calls out to Guy, seemingly breaking Sophia's hold on him. Guy insists that they must rebury the dolls to put Sophia's spirit at rest. The survivors do, however Guy later slips away behind a stone pillar. When the camera follows him around the corner a zombified Sophia is shown staring back at the viewer.

== Cast and characters ==
- Jared Kusnitz as Guy Fillbrook, a nerdy high school freshman who collects special edition action figures.
- Gabrielle Lynn as DeeDee Fillbrook, a few years older than Guy but still in high school.
- Anna Alicia Brock as Terri, DeeDee's newer friend, she is shy and shares an interest in Guy and his action figures.
- Kristyn Green as Olivia, DeeDee's promiscuous friend, she has previously hooked up with Rich.
- Brian Lloyd as Rich, a jock who bullies Guy.
- Scott Seymour as Tom, a jock who bullies Guy.
- Ken Lyle as Lester Fillbrook / Cyril. Lester is DeeDee & Guy's single father and Cyril is Sophia's abusive father, both characters are portrayed by Lyle.
- Hannah Marks as Sophia, a young girl who dies accidentally and is buried by Cyril, now a vengeful spirit.

=== Dolls ===
- Ooga Booga - possibly modeled after an African warrior, the character is a reference to the Zuni fetish doll from Trilogy of Terror and carries a sharp spear. The spin off film, Ooga Booga, stars Karen Black who, decades before, starred in the original Trilogy of Terror.
- German Soldier - carries a mini Luger pistol and has a helmet with a long metal spike on top of it.
- Porcelain Girl - her face is cracked open in a way that gives her an ear to ear grin of jagged porcelain (a Glasgow smile).
- Samurai - carries a mini katana.

== Production ==
Doll Graveyard was filmed at The Houdini Estate during a brief period when director Charles Band happened to own the property and lived there. The doll characters were controlled with rod puppets.

== Release ==
The film was initially released in October 2005 on DVD. It has since been included in several DVD collections of Full Moon films or other straight-to-DVD horrors. A remastered Blu-ray was released on September 10, 2024.

A black and white version of the film was released on May 26, 2025.

== Reception ==
DreadCentral.com gave the film a mostly negative review saying that while the dolls featured in the film are somewhat intriguing in their gimmicks but ultimately pale imitations of some of Band's previous puppet and doll creations. The reviewer, Jon Condit, also compared Doll Graveyard to Full Moon's other film released around the same time, The Gingerdead Man, but cites the latter film's supporting characters as being more interesting than those in the former. Condit awarded the film 2/5 knives (stars). Scott Weinberg reviewed the movie for DVD Talk, stating that it was a "small-but-noticeable step up for the earnestly resurgent Charles Band".

== Spin off ==
Ooga Booga, a film based on the African warrior doll, was released March 12, 2013. In the movie there is also Hambo, also known from Zombies vs. Strippers (2012) and the Evil Bong franchise.

== In popular culture ==
The doll Ooga Booga has appeared multiple times in the Evil Bong film series and in the Evil Bong spin-off film The Gingerweed Man, as a secondary protagonist.

== See also ==
- Killer toy
