= Underemployed (TV series) =

- Diego Boneta, Sarah Habel, Michelle Ang, Inbar Lavi and Jared Kusnitz (from left)
- Genre: Drama; Comedy
- Created by: Craig Wright
- Starring: Michelle Ang; Diego Boneta; Sarah Habel; Jared Kusnitz; Inbar Lavi
- Country of origin: United States
- Original language: English
- No. of seasons: 1
- No. of episodes: 12

Production
- Executive producers: Craig Wright; Justin Levy; Clay Spencer; Julie Schwachenwald
- Editor: Geofrey Hildrew
- Running time: 42 minutes (excluding commercials)
- Production companies: Pine City; MTV Production Development

Original release
- Network: MTV
- Release: October 16, 2012 – January 12, 2013

Underemployed is an American comedy-drama television series on MTV. The series premiered on October 16, 2012 and ended on January 12, 2013.

== Premise ==
The series evolves around a group of five fresh graduates who met and became close friends during college.

Initially, each had their big dreams and were very determined to make them happen: Lou wanted to pursue graduate school and eventually become an environmental lawyer; Raviva broke up with Lou to move to Los Angeles in the hope of making it in the music industry; Miles wanted to be a model and the face of Calvin Klein; Sophia wanted to become a writer; and Daphne just wanted to be successful.

Unfortunately, life doesn't always work out.

== Cast ==
=== Main ===
- Michelle Ang as Sophia Swanson
- Diego Boneta as Miles Gonzalez
- Sarah Habel as Daphne Glover
- Jared Kusnitz as Louis "Lou" Craft
- Inbar Lavi as Raviva

=== Recurring ===
- Julianna Guill as Bekah
- Rachel Cannon as Deb
- Daniel Johnson as Jamel
- Danny McCarthy as Paul
- Olesya Rulin as Pixie Dexter
- Bar Paly as Tatiana
- Charlie Weber as Todd
- Angel M. Wainwright as Laura

== Episodes ==
No.	Title	Original release date	U.S. viewers (millions)
1	"Pilot"	October 16, 2012	0.65
2	"The Crib"	October 23, 2012	0.65
Sophia gets into trouble and is arrested. Miles' girlfriend Tatiana tells everyone that she's going to move out. Daphne enjoys life with her new romance with Todd. Lou is surprising Raviva by making the house baby-friendly.
3	"The Roommate"	October 30, 2012	0.40
Todd feels evil and steals Daphne's idea. Miles comes to terms and realizes he can't handle living with a baby. Sophia thinks about Raviva's advice and agrees to follow it.
4	"The Days of Yore"	November 6, 2012	0.40
Raviva and Lou's relationship is at stake when a disagreement about money ends badly. Miles ends up being hired onto Daphne's campaign team. Sophia is joyful when her parents come to visit.
5	"The Trivial Pursuit"	November 13, 2012	0.38
Raviva and Lou are happy to receive news that they can have post-baby intercourse. The group gathers for a fun trivia night. Daphne and Miles try to ignore each other's drunken advances. Sophia attempts to get a promotion.
6	"The Tasting"	November 20, 2012	0.61
Daphne and Miles throw a party for their client. Sophia feels regretful after letting Laura purchase a new phone for her. Jamel and Bekah put Lou and Raviva in an uncomfortable situation.
7	"The Focus Group"	November 27, 2012	0.34
Sophia is unsure what to do when she comes up short on rent. Raviva is worried that Lou is separating from the group. Miles goes to get medical help for his problem.
8	"The Gig"	December 8, 2012	0.28
Raviva prepares for her first performance. Lou discovers that Jamel was involved. Daphne is worried about Todd being so controlling.
9	"The Confession"	December 22, 2012	0.28
Bekah ends up sending some explicit text messages. Sophia is worried about using her friends within her upcoming novel. Daphne wants Todd to be impressed by her classy party.
10	"The Kids"	December 29, 2012	0.23
Raviva is angry after Lou breaks a promise. Miles gets some saddening news from Daphne.
11	"The Message"	January 5, 2013	0.24
Sophia completes and publishes her book. A record label approaches Raviva about producing her song. Lou starts apply for school. Daphne chooses between Miles and Todd.
12	"The Heart"	January 12, 2013	0.34
Miles plans to pursue modeling abroad and invites Daphne along. Sophia throws a party for her brand-new, first published book. Lou tries to get Raviva back.

== Critical reception ==
On Metacritic, the series scored a 56 based on twelve critic reviews.

The Chicago Tribune said the show needs to offer a lot more than what was served in the first few episodes to compete on the level of Girls on HBO and Workaholics on Comedy Central. The New York Times said the show is a botched attempt at a dirty-sexy-funny show.
