= The Other Side (2006 film) =

- Official poster
- Directed by: Gregg Bishop
- Written by: Gregg Bishop
- Produced by: Gregg Bishop; Chad Eikoff
- Starring: Nathan Mobley; Jaimie Alexander; Cory Rouse; Poncho Hodges
- Cinematography: Sherman Johnson
- Edited by: Gregg Bishop
- Music by: Kristopher Carter
- Distributed by: Allumination Filmworks
- Release dates: January 2006 (Slamdance Film Festival); September 28, 2007 (United States)
- Running time: 95 minutes
- Country: United States
- Language: English

The Other Side is a 2007 film written and directed by Gregg Bishop, who also served as the film's editor, cinematographer and visual effects artist. The Other Side follows Samuel North (Nathan Mobley) who escapes from Hell to find the person who murdered him, but a team of invincible bounty hunters called Reapers are sent from the Netherworld to bring him back.

After graduating from the University of Southern California filmschool, Bishop took the profits he made from his short film Voodoo and financed his first feature film The Other Side himself with $15,000. The supernatural action/thriller starred Jaimie Alexander in her first leading role and premiered at the Slamdance Film Festival in Park City, Utah where it was acquired for a 2007 theatrical release for an undisclosed amount. In 2019, Bishop began developing the movie as a TV series.

== Plot ==
Samuel North has returned from college to reunite with his girlfriend Hanna Thompson. On the night he is to have a romantic dinner with her on the banks of a river she does not show up, and he is run into the river by a large white van. His soul goes to Hell, aka "The Pit," where he is tormented by the worst memories of his life, including being bullied, finding his parents murdered, and the regretful taxi ride to college, which took him from Hanna. However, he experiences only a moment of torment before being rescued by other souls who have found a way out. He escapes and wakes up along with the other escapees in a hospital, where he learns that Hanna did not return home the previous night, and he is a suspect for her disappearance. Before he can find out any more, three bounty hunters dispatched from hell to retrieve them appear. Only Sam and two others escape. The duo, Mally and Oz, have both escaped numerous times only to be caught and brought back. They explain that two of the three bounty hunters are "Switchers," who can switch from dead body to body when their host body is killed. However their leader, a "Changer," does not need to change unless into its native demonic form. They escape to a motel filled with escapees, all scarred by the Mark of the Damned, which is how the Reapers track them.

Mally and Oz originally plan to escape to Mexico; however, Sam is determined to find Hanna. Mally wants to flee to Mexico, but Oz decides to help Sam find Hanna, believing that helping him may be their ticket to Redemption and out of The Pit for good. Mally relents and the trio go to the bar where Hanna worked. Sam discovers that Hanna was being sexually harassed by a regular named Isaac, and that one of Hanna's friends had told Isaac that Hanna was reporting him to the police. The friend further explains that Isaac followed Hanna out to her car and didn't return home that night.

The trio find Hanna's car in the woods near the river and a dead body next to it. Sam's police friend, Peter, informs him the dead body was John Rice, who drove a white van. However, he was pulled over and stabbed to death and his white van was hijacked. Later that night, while picking up a few items from his brother, David, Sam is shot at by a man in the white van and his brother is injured. After dropping David off at the Emergency Room he breaks into Isaac's house and interrogates him, only to receive a truthful answer that Isaac left Hanna alone.

Sam returns to the motel just before it is attacked by the Reapers. Although many escapees are killed and sent back to The Pit, they succeed in sending one Switcher back to Hell. Mally and Oz, tired of fighting, decide to leave for Mexico. But before they can leave Sam reveals the sin for which he went to Hell: murder. Despite this, Oz and Mally leave Sam alone to fight the Reapers. Later on Sam is attacked by the Reapers, but manages to send another Switcher back to Hell. Meanwhile, Hanna's body is found in a river, and the search is called off.

David, meanwhile, is let out of the hospital, and Peter offers to drive him home. On the way he sees the white van and finds the driver has entered a motel. Before he can call in backup, David shoots and kills him and confronts the man in the white van. It is revealed that David hired the man to kill Hanna and Sam. He berates him for being careless and not burying the body and ditching the van. The man forces David to arrange a meeting at the Church between him and Sam. They meet, and it is revealed the man is William Cain, the man who murdered Sam's parents and who Sam—in revenge—killed as he was trying to escape. William also escaped from Hell and offered to kill Sam and Hanna so that David could claim the inheritance, because their parent's will left everything to Sam, and Sam's will left everything to Hanna. Before Will can kill Sam, the final Reaper—the Changer—arrives and attacks both of them and kills William, but not before he tells Sam that David hired him to kill him. Now in its natural form the Changer nearly kills Sam before being killed by Mally and Oz, who have returned. Oz confesses that Sam didn't escape by accident and was in fact broken out by Oz, who is a Guardian Angel. He offers to take Sam down to Mexico, but Sam stays to confront his brother. David admits not only to having Will kill Sam and Hanna but also having their parents murdered by Will because he was jealous of both his parents' treatment of Sam as well as the inheritance money. Following their argument, Sam is shot by David. In a brief struggle Sam gains the upper hand and spares his brother, only to be shot in the back as he is leaving. As the police arrive to arrest David, Sam has the opportunity to fire back at David; however, he instead spends his final moments staring at a picture of him and Hanna happily together. For this act Sam gains redemption for his previous sin. After he dies, he awakens in heaven with Hanna, where they spend the rest of eternity happily ever after.

== Cast ==
- Nathan Mobley as Samuel North
- Jaimie Alexander as Hanna Thompson
- Cory Rouse as Mally
- Poncho Hodges as Oz
- Shale Nelson as David North, Sam's brother
- Stephen Caudill as Pete, Sam's Police Friend
- Chris Burns as Isaac
- Vince Canlas as William Cain
- Blair Redford as Reaper #3
- Lucas Till as Young Sam North

== Production ==
After graduating from USC filmschool, writer/director Gregg Bishop financed The Other Side himself with $15,000, which were the profits made from his short film Voodoo. The movie was shot in Atlanta on Super 16mm with a skeleton crew using borrowed equipment and film gear.

== Reception ==
The film premiered to mostly positive reviews. Variety called "'The Other Side' a lean, propulsively paced supernatural thriller, packed with pulse pounding excitement” and Scott Weinberg of efilmcritic.com gave the movie a 4/5 and says the movie is "fast-paced, creative, and entertaining. It's like an equivalent of an overstuffed Halloween goody bag that's been spilled all over the carpet. It's colorfully kinetic, strangely engaging, and enjoyable throughout."

Chuck Wilson of LA Weekly says that "Bishop has chops; someone give this man a meeting!" and Steve Biodrowski called "'The Other Side' the El Mariachi of horror films" and hailed it as “one of the best films of the year.” David Walker of DVD Talk says the movie is "an incredibly impressive achievement in the world of indie cinema. For die-hard fans of micro-budget independent films, as well as aspiring and established filmmakers, The Other Side verges on being required viewing, standing out as movie that is entertaining, impressive, and most important, inspiring."
