= Jared Kusnitz =

American actor

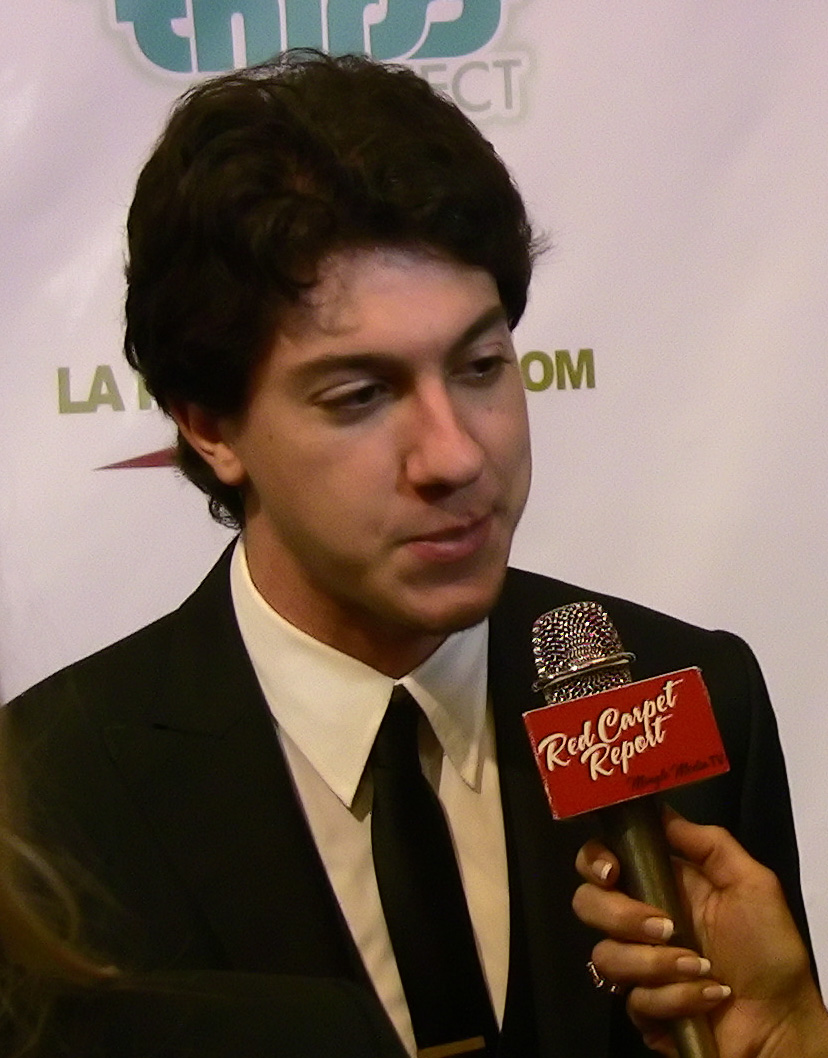
- Kusnitz in June 2011
- Born: Fort Lauderdale, Florida, U.S.
- Years active: 2005–present

Jared Kusnitz is an American actor. He has appeared in the films Doll Graveyard (2005), Dance of the Dead (2008), and Prom (2011), and television series such as The Secret Life of the American Teenager, Good Luck Charlie, and Underemployed.

== Early life ==
Kusnitz was born and raised in Fort Lauderdale, Florida. He is Jewish.

== Filmography ==
=== Film ===
Year	Title	Role	Notes
2005	Doll Graveyard	Guy Fillbrook	
2006	Three Strikes	James	Television film
2008	Otis	Reed Lawson	
2008	Dance of the Dead	Jimmy Dunn	
2008	The Taste of Summer	Will	
2009	Meanwhile, at the Plaza...	Noah	
2010	Continental Divide	Mitchell	
2011	Prom	Justin Wexler	

=== Television ===
Year	Title	Role	Notes
2005	Fatherhood	Bobby	Episode: "Birds, Bees and Bindlebeep"
2009	Phineas and Ferb	Marty	Voice; Episode: "Oh, There You Are, Perry/Swiss Family Phineas"
2009	Surviving Suburbia	Henry Patterson	13 episodes
2009	Private Practice	Ryan Crawford	1 episode
2010	Community	Mark	Episode: "The Art of Discourse"
2010	The Secret Life of the American Teenager	Toby	
2011	Good Luck Charlie	Grant	
2012	Underemployed	Louis "Lou" Craft	
2014	Castle	Adam Lane / Netslayer	1 episode
2017	Ballers	Byron	3 episodes
