= Atomica (film) =

- Directed by: Dagen Merrill
- Written by: Kevin Burke; Fred Fernandez-Armesto; Adam Gyngell
- Produced by: Jaime Burke; Vahan Paretchan
- Starring: Dominic Monaghan; Tom Sizemore; Sarah Habel
- Distributed by: Syfy Films
- Release dates: March 17, 2017 (Theatrical); March 21, 2017 (VOD)
- Country: United States
- Language: English

Atomica is an American science fiction thriller film directed by Dagen Merrill and starring Dominic Monaghan. The film was released theatrically on March 17, 2017, and was released on VOD on March 21, 2017.

== Plot ==
In the near future, the clash between oil and green energy conglomerates results in skyrocketing energy prices and global riots. Amidst this chaos, the corporation Auxilisun develops the tri-fission reactor, a device that not only produces abundant nuclear energy through atomic fission, but also converts nuclear waste into additional clean energy. The tri-fission reactor renders all other forms of energy production obsolete, and Auxilisun power plants are built around the world, providing an inexhaustible supply of cheap energy for all.

Decades later, on Christmas Day, Auxilisun technician Abby travels to Gibson Desert North, the flagship Auxilisun plant built over a nuclear waste storage facility deep within a radioactive "red zone", to restore a broken communications relay. She finds the plant poorly-maintained and seemingly deserted, with no sign of caretakers Dr. Zek and Robinson, but the latter appears brandishing a golf club and demands that she identify herself. He calms down when she complies, but when asked about Zek, he vaguely replies that the doctor is somewhere outside the plant conducting a survey.

As Abby attempts to repair the communications relay and Zek remains absent, she gradually discovers more serious problems affecting the plant's performance and becomes suspicious of the oddly-behaving Robinson, who displays a considerable ignorance of the workings of the machines he supposedly maintains. Abby eventually tracks Zek down in the red zone, but finds him unconscious. When she returns to the plant with Zek in tow, Robinson initially refuses them entry, but soon relents and explains he was following contamination protocol. Robinson also reveals that Zek had experienced a nervous breakdown on the night he left. With Zek moved to the medical bay to recover, a new crisis emerges: one of the plant's two main ventilation fans, ostensibly designed to function flawlessly for thousands of years, inexplicably fails, and volatile gases begin building up in the facility. Abby concludes that the fan had been sabotaged by a crazed Zek before her arrival, and handcuffs him to his bed.

Zek finally awakes, and despite treating Robinson with familiarity, he informs Abby that Robinson is an impostor. Days ago, the real Robinson had disappeared and Zek had gone out in search of him, but was knocked out by an unseen assailant, likely the impostor. Somehow, the false Robinson had made it past the red zone and was posing as Robinson for unknown reasons. Zek urges Abby to send a distress signal to Auxilisun HQ, but with comms still down, she has to venture back outside the plant and build a makeshift array while Robinson is occupied.

That night, as Abby tries to slip out of the plant with Zek to send the signal, Robinson catches them and angrily demands Zek tell Abby the truth about Gibson Desert North. Zek fends Robinson off and locks him and Abby in the medical bay. Robinson explains to Abby that Zek had rigged the entire plant into a bomb. As they search the plant separately for Zek, Abby discovers the real Robinson's body in a locker and realizes Zek had not lied. After Robinson incapacitates Zek, Abby turns against Robinson, but the latter overpowers her and amputates one of her fingers to unlock Deep Burial, the facility's nuclear waste repository. Abby confronts Zek with her findings that Gibson Desert North had been decaying for years despite Auxilisun's public assurances that the technology was failsafe, and that the red zone had expanded hundreds of miles into a town called Barrow Creek and was killing the residents. Zek confirms that Barrow Creek was being covered up to avoid a public relations disaster, as too much of the world was dependent on Auxilisun to allow its technology to be called into question. Disgusted, Abby leaves him to escape the plant on his own.

At Deep Burial, Abby corners Robinson, who unmasks himself as the sole survivor of Barrow Creek. Since he had already been fatally irradiated, he had walked through the red zone to Gibson Desert North to destroy it and avenge the death of his family. Robinson then ignites Deep Burial, setting off a catastrophic chain reaction. Abby makes it out of the imploding facility, but when the only transport craft leaves her stranded, she removes her protective suit's helmet and allows herself to succumb to the radiation. Sometime later, presumed Auxilisun employees secure evidence of the disaster, including Abby's corpse and the datapad containing her personal logs.

== Cast ==
- Sarah Habel as Abby Dixon
  - Sarah-Eve Gazitt as Young Abby Dixon
- Tom Sizemore as Darius Zek
- Dominic Monaghan as Robinson Scott

== Production ==
The film was written by Fred Fernandez-Armesto, Adam Gyngell and Kevin Burke. Dominic Monaghan, one of the film's cast members, is also credited as one of the film's executive producers. It is the second film to be produced under the Syfy Films label, after 400 Days, which was released in 2016.

== Release ==
The film was released in theaters on March 17, 2017, and on video-on-demand on March 21, 2017.
