= Joe Stevens =

American photographer (1938–2025)

- Born: Joseph Stevens Grady; July 25, 1938; New York City, U.S.
- Died: August 26, 2025 (aged 87); Concord, New Hampshire, U.S.
- Occupation: Photographer
- Known for: Photography of musicians

Joseph Stevens Grady (July 25, 1938 – August 26, 2025), working professionally Joe Stevens, was an American photographer best known for his photographs of musicians and bands such as David Bowie, the Sex Pistols, and The Clash. In 2012, his work was part of a major retrospective of rock photography at The Annenberg Space for Photography in Los Angeles. His photos continued to appear in the British magazine UNCUT and The New York Times.

== Early life ==
Joseph Stevens Grady was born in the Bronx on July 25, 1938. After his parents divorced, he grew up in Queens, where he was raised by his mother.

== Career ==
In the 1960s, Stevens managed the Playhouse, a Greenwich Village coffeehouse, where he began photographing the musicians who played there. He was encouraged by photographer Jim Marshall. Stevens did not have formal training in photography, but worked in the music business as road manager for Miriam Makeba and The Lovin' Spoonful.

After meeting Jim Marshall again at Woodstock, Stevens decided he "had an eye" for capturing images and would make photography his career. He considered becoming a war photographer and traveled to Ireland in 1971 to photograph the Troubles. In Belfast, he was mistaken for a terrorist and imprisoned for two months before being released.

Settling in England, Stevens took photos for the International Times, which were credited to "Captain Snaps" until he received a work permit. In 1972, Paul McCartney hired him on the recommendation of his wife Linda McCartney to photograph the Wings Over Europe Tour. Linda knew Stevens from her time as a photographer in New York City.

Stevens photographed for the New Musical Express in London for most of the 1970s, including a number of covers. Returning to New York City, he photographed the CBGB club scene, capturing early images of Debbie Harry and the Ramones.

Images that are typical of his informal style include Paul McCartney hiding his face in Linda McCartney's arms during their arrest for marijuana possession in Sweden; John Lennon wearing plastic bags on his hands while protesting the 1971 obscenity trial of Oz magazine; Peter Gabriel covered with soap bubbles in the bathtub of Stevens's London flat; and the fight between the Sex Pistols and their audience at London's Nashville Rooms in 1976.

In January 1978, Stevens photographed the Sex Pistols on their only American tour. When the group broke up in San Francisco, Stevens gave singer Johnny Rotten (John Lydon) airfare to New York City, and Rotten stayed with Stevens in his New York apartment before returning to London.

Stevens described himself as a chronicler of history. In 2015, Thurston Moore of Sonic Youth said Stevens "was really the bridge between New York and London. . . . He was really significant in the whole history that was developing in new music at that time." In 2018, his photographs appeared in the biography of Led Zeppelin guitarist Jimmy Page and autobiography of British-American media executive Les Hinton.

== Commercial use of work ==
Stevens' 1965 photograph of Johnny Cash and guitarist Luther Perkins backstage at Carnegie Hall was used in the 2019 public television series Country Music.

Stevens' photograph of blues musician B. B. King in London appeared in the 2024 biography of King's cousin Bukka White.

== Personal life and death ==
Both of Stevens' marriages ended in divorce.

Moving to New Hampshire in the 1980s, Stevens' lived in Portsmouth for many years and died in hospice in Concord, New Hampshire, on August 26, 2025. He was 87.
