= Kirby Reed =

Fictional character in the Scream film series

- Scream character
- Hayden Panettiere as Kirby Reed in Scream 4 (2011)
- First appearance: Scream 4 (2011)
- Last appearance: Scream VI (2023)
- Created by: Kevin Williamson
- Portrayed by: Hayden Panettiere

In-universe information
- Alias: Woodsboro Survivor
- Occupation: Woodsboro high senior (graduated); FBI special agent
- Significant others: Charlie Walker (former love interest; deceased)
- Location: Woodsboro (formerly); Atlanta (currently); New York (temporary, formerly)
- Status: Alive

Kirby Reed is a fictional character in the Scream film series, created by Kevin Williamson and portrayed by Hayden Panettiere. She first appeared in Scream 4 (2011) and returns in Scream VI (2023). The character is a target in the fourth killing spree committed by Ghostface, a mysterious, masked killer who wears a ghost mask and black cloak, to pursue her and her friends. In each film, the killer targets their victims with threatening phone calls and intimate knowledge of their target's lives before one or several of the alleged victims is revealed as a killer.

In Scream 4, Reed is introduced as the best friend of franchise protagonist Sidney Prescott's young cousin, Jill Roberts, a millennial target for a copycat anniversary serial killer wearing the infamous Ghostface costume. Since the original killings, no killer has targeted Woodsboro until 2011, making it the second Woodsboro massacre. Panettiere's character worries for her survival after not receiving a phone call like her best friends. The character is a horror genre savvy, trivia fanatic with a dry sense of humor who makes sarcastic quips. She shows subtle interest in fellow film geek Charlie Walker. Kirby reappears in Scream VI, now an FBI special agent based in Atlanta who travels to New York to assist in the investigation into the latest Ghostface knockoff mystery.

She is initially slotted into the "sidekick" archetype but outgrows this by the final act. She rises to heroine status by the end and is left near-fatally wounded. Being the only unconfirmed victim of the Woodsboro Remake, Kirby was confirmed alive through a photographic cameo in the fifth entry, making her the sole teenage survivor of the fourth film and a final girl.

Kirby has been described as a "fan-favorite" and the fourth film's breakout character.

== Appearances ==
=== Scream 4 (2011) ===
Kirby's first appearance is in Scream 4 (2011) as the 18-year-old high school senior from the fictional town of Woodsboro, in Northern California. The anniversary week of Billy Loomis (Skeet Ulrich) and Stu Macher (Matthew Lillard)'s original killing spree coincides with the murder of her classmates, Jenny Randall (Aimee Teegarden) and Marnie Cooper (Britt Robertson). She stays at her best friend, Jill Roberts (Emma Roberts)'s house, with her mother, Kate (Mary McDonnell) and Jill's celebrity cousin and heroine, Sidney Prescott (Neve Campbell), whom Kirby admires and looks up to. Kirby credits Sidney for her love of horror movies. They receive police protection from Dewey Riley (David Arquette) by Deputies Perkins (Anthony Anderson) and Hoss (Adam Brody). Kirby gets her first call, amid watching Shaun of the Dead with Jill. Ghostface claims to be in Jill's closet, but it turns out to be their other best friend, Olivia Morris (Marielle Jaffe)'s closet next door, whom they watch get savagely murdered. Kirby tends to Jill after she is slashed on the arm by Ghostface following Olivia's murder.

She attends film geeks Charlie Walker (Rory Culkin) and Robbie Mercer (Erik Knudsen)'s third annual Stab-A-Thon, a Friday night movie marathon celebrating all seven Stab films back-to-back. The venue takes place at an abandoned farm, where Gale Riley (Courteney Cox) is stabbed during the Casey Becker (Heather Graham) opening scene. The sheriff's wife being left in critical condition causes the teens to disperse. The exception to this is Jill, who was prohibited from attending the party by her mother. Kirby is contacted by a snuck-out Jill to pick her up due to her mother "driving [her] crazy", and they invite Robbie and Charlie to Kirby's for an afterparty. Trevor Sheldon (Nico Tortorella)—whom she had been suspicious of—shows up uninvited, much to her annoyance, and Charlie apologizes, being the last arrival. A drunken Kirby almost kisses Charlie, but Trevor barges in again, causing Charlie to storm off.

After Sidney arrives to warn Jill to leave, Ghostface has followed and launches at the three women at the front door after Robbie collapses to his death in front of them; the cousins run upstairs, while Kirby runs to another room in her main hallway. Kirby later reconvenes with Sidney again to say someone has smashed the router and the landline is dead; Sidney informs her she may have gotten in contact with the police. The two find Charlie outside her basement patio doors, where Sidney tells her not to let him in if she cannot trust him. Kirby cries, telling him she cannot open the door.

Ghostface arrives to attack him. Then the lights shut. When they re-open, Charlie is duct-taped and rope-tied to a chair, like Steven Orth (Kevin Patrick Walls) in the original film's opening scene. Kirby must save his life with horror trivia questions, a callback to Casey Becker (Drew Barrymore), also in the original scene, now taking place in the tentative climax. She mentions Psycho (1960) as starting the slasher craze, but the killer states it is Peeping Tom (1960), the first film to "put the audience in the killer's POV." She begs for one more question to save Charlie's life. After answering every remake she can think of, Ghostface goes silent, making her assume she has won the trivia game.

Kirby goes out to untie and release Charlie, and in doing so, he stabs her in the stomach, revealing he is one of the killers. He blames her for not noticing him sooner, and is tearful about having to kill her. He stabs her in the stomach again, leaving her to drop on the floor and bleed out, still motioning on the ground. Sidney later hears a noise from the basement before Charlie grabs her and takes her away to be confronted with the other killer, Kirby's best friend, Jill. With the other two accounted for in the main hallway, it is inferred that the noise comes from Kirby, who crawls in after being stabbed. Dewey, Judy Hicks (Marley Shelton) and the remaining cops arrive; the victim-acting Jill mistakes Sidney and Kirby, both stabbed in the stomach twice, as being dead. Being a family member, Dewey naively discloses to Jill that Sidney is alive; while Jill targets Sidney in her recovering hospital bed, Sidney is able to subdue and kill her psychotic cousin. Meanwhile, it is assumed Kirby was found in the basement by other law enforcement off-screen. Jill is falsely identified as a survivor, while Kirby, whose fate is in limbo, is the later-revealed true survivor and final girl.

=== Scream VI (2023) ===
Kirby appears again in Scream VI, now an FBI special agent and living in Atlanta. She works alongside Detective Bailey to investigate the latest attacks made by the Ghostface killer, acknowledging her previous attack by Charlie Walker in 2011. It is shown that Kirby and Samantha Carpenter are familiar with each other, both having attended Woodsboro High School together and have a friendly reunion at the NYPD station. Kirby accompanies Sam and her friends to the Ghostface shrine, where she is seen looking at items belonging to her former best friend and past killer, Jill Roberts along with evidence from her attack at the hands of Charlie Walker.

During the finale, Kirby helps Sam turn the shrine into a trap and reveals she is the only one of them that will be armed with a gun. Detective Bailey then contacts Sam to inform her that Kirby was fired from the FBI months prior due to mental instability from her previous attack. Once Bailey arrives at the scene, Kirby is shown to have been attacked again by another Ghostface killer, although Sam remains suspicious. Kirby quickly alerts Detective Bailey when she sees another Ghostface appear behind him, only to be shot twice by Bailey, who reveals himself to be one of the killers along with his children, Ethan Landry and Quinn.

Kirby is then shown to have worn a bulletproof vest and has survived her shooting, but is later stabbed once again by Ethan before killing him for good by dropping the TV that was used to kill Stu Macher on his head. She is then seen receiving medical attention for her attack, instructing Sam to call her anytime she needs.

=== Other appearances ===
Kirby has a small cameo appearance via photograph in the fifth Scream film, simply titled Scream (2022), confirming her survival. When Richie Kirsch (Jack Quaid) watches a YouTube video by Film Fails criticizing Stab 8, she is seen in a thumbnail still on the top video on the sidebar. The video titled "Interview with Woodsboro Survivor Kirby Reed!", uploaded by Bloody Disgusting three years prior when Kirby would have been 25 or 26 years old.

== Casting and development ==
=== Casting ===
Hayden Panettiere was announced as having been offered a role on Scream 4 (2011) on May 21, 2010, following the cancellation of Heroes (2006–2010). The character was described as fulfilling the "best friend" archetype to Jill Roberts (portrayed by Emma Roberts), the new heroine and the cousin of Sidney Prescott (portrayed by Neve Campbell). One week later, Panettiere and Rory Culkin were confirmed to star in the film.

=== Personality and creation ===
A very different character than I've ever played. She's kind of a tomboy. She's got that, that edge to her. That dry, sarcastic sense of humor which I loved playing. And underneath that, she's this horror movie buff that you don't expect from her. So she's very surprising.

— Panettiere on her character, Kirby in an April 2011 Scream 4 promotional interview.

The casting call for Kirby characterized her as "Cute and quirky, was a tomboy until a year ago, now she's alternative, cool and sexy. Jill's best friend. She's a pop culture and horror aficionado.". Panettiere responded to rumors that she was unsatisfied with her role during the press release for Scream 4: "I actually think my role is very, very, very fun. She's very sassy. She's very strong. It's a character I don't think I've ever played before. Her name is Kirby". She described portraying the character and taking direction from director Wes Craven as "a blast".

In an interview promoting the film, Craven praised Panettiere's performance as Kirby, working under a supporting cast member role and said, "Hayden is a real powerhouse. Tremendous technical ability. Able to bring enormous emotionalities to something very quickly. Smart. Just so full of life and laughter and fun. And, you know, played this really difficult role as Emma's best friend. And again, brought the picture up so much in her scenes. [...] she just re-affirmed that she is just a really great actress [...] packed into a very small package—but wow, what a powerhouse".

On Kirby's development off-screen between the fourth and sixth films, Panettiere stated, "She's come a long way. What happened to her has obviously impacted her life, and it sends her in a certain direction, but she's still the same old Kirby at the heart of it. She's just a little older, a little wiser, but just as spitfire-y, and snarky, and all that good stuff".

=== Fate ===
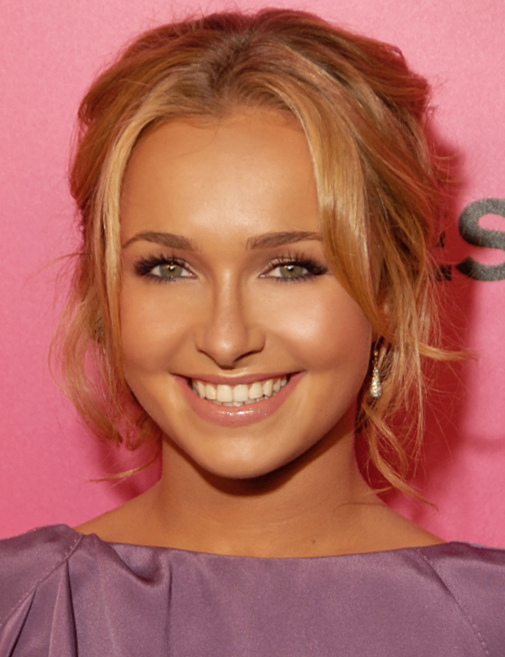
The uncertain fate of Panettiere's character in Scream 4 sparked discussion of her potential survival.

In an October 2011 interview, Craven discussed Kirby's uncertain fate following the film's release in April. He revealed actress Hayden Panettiere had a no-kill clause in her contract and further stated that she did not die on-screen, as she "kept moving on the ground", but also expressed uncertainty on the development of a fifth film. On January 14, 2012, a fan tweeted to Craven. He asked if Kirby died and Craven tweet-replied, "I don't think so. She was still moving when we cut away from her..." Craven died in August 2015 and the fate of the franchise went into limbo following the dissolution of The Weinstein Company after the sexual abuse cases against Harvey Weinstein came to light. The franchise rights were bought by Spyglass Media Group in November 2019.

In November 2019, Spyglass acquired the rights to make a new Scream film, then-unknown to be a direct Scream 4 sequel. In March 2020, it was announced that Matt Bettinelli-Olpin and Tyler Gillett would direct the fifth installment, with Kevin Williamson serving as an executive producer, and that the film had already entered official development.

Co-director Matt Bettinelli-Olpin spoke about answering Kirby's fate, stating, "Honestly, the only reason she wasn't in it is because we were so far down the road that it would have been an injustice to Kirby to sort of shoehorn her in," he said. "But we did know that we wanted to somehow answer that at some point". Co-director Tyler Gillett elaborated, "The perfect moment came when the crew was doing post production. They were looking at the YouTube page where she would ultimately make her appearance".

Originally, the "blink-and-miss" cameo appearance was the original stand-in for the YouTube video clip that Richie Kirsch (Jack Quaid) watches. Gillett said that the YouTube page was not going to be used and instead, "It was going to be an interview with Rian Johnson" (the film's movie-within-a-movie director, parodying the backlash to the eighth Star Wars film's backlash, of which Johnson directed) where Panettiere's character speaks about "how great" Stab 8 is. "When scheduling made the Rian Johnson thing not work out, we designed the YouTube page and the first thing we said was, 'This is where we can answer the Kirby thing. This is where we can let people know Kirby survived. We'll make this an Easter egg'. As soon as we did that, we're like, 'Oh, it's great. It's subtle'. But it answers the thing we all wanted to know: did she live or die?", Gillett stated. "We went back to that Wes Craven quote," Bettinelli-Olpin further shared. "And just thought, all right, let's see that through. We also just loved giving that piece of information in such a small way," he explained. "We know that the fans that really genuinely care about Kirby and are in the did Kirby live or die debate are watching things that closely."

== Reception ==
=== Reviews ===
For Tilt Magazine, Sarah Truesdale reviewed Scream 4 on its ten-year anniversary, and referred to Panettiere as Kirby being "easily the best part of the film,". She also expressed enthusiasm at the idea of Kirby reappearing in the franchise's future stating that after Panettiere spent "many years [...] post-Heroes and Scream in the very un-genre series Nashville [i]t would be nice to see her show back up in this realm again." Germain Lussier for Gizmodo retroactively praised the film in a retrospective review and singled out Panettiere saying, "the kids throughout are wonderful, especially Hayden Panettiere—who spent many years post-Heroes and Scream in the very un-genre series Nashville. It would be nice to see her show back up in this realm again." William Hughes for The A.V. Club also described Panettiere as "one of the best parts of Scream 4" when noting her Scream VI return.

In a 2021 Fangoria article, Julieann Stipidis noted the importance of Kirby, stating, "The epitome of effortlessly cool, the chic, quick-witted, middle finger-flipping secondary character chewed her way through the scenery, showcasing an abundance of horror knowledge and enthusiasm – and becoming a favorite among women horror fans who had never before quite seen themselves depicted in the mainstream." She further stated, "And exactly 10 years later to the day, we still haven’t really witnessed anything quite like a Kirby again", and noted the minimality of examples in similar characters introduced later in the 2010s.

Melanson for Fangoria in 2022 wrote about Kirby's return for the sixth installment stating, "And while we appreciated the confirmation (Kirby lives!) and nod to this fan-favorite, we are happy to see Kirby returning as more than an easter egg for astute eyeballs." Fans reacted to the news of Panettiere's return to the role 12 years later with excitement, but also fear that she would be killed off.
