= Ghostface (Scream) =

Antagonists in the Scream media franchise

- Scream character
- Ghostface costume display featured in behind-the-scenes material for Scream VI (2023)
- First appearance: Scream (1996)
- Created by: Kevin Williamson
- Portrayed by: Several actors: Skeet Ulrich and Matthew Lillard (1996); Timothy Olyphant and Laurie Metcalf (1997); Scott Foley (2000); Rory Culkin and Emma Roberts (2011); Amelia Rose Blaire and Amadeus Serafini (2015–2016); Alexander Calvert (2016); Giorgia Whigham and Tyga (2019); Mikey Madison and Jack Quaid (2022); Tony Revolori, Dermot Mulroney, Jack Champion, and Liana Liberato (2023); Kraig Dane, Ethan Embry, and Anna Camp (2026)
- Voiced by: Several actors: Roger L. Jackson; Mike Vaughn (2015–2016); Filip Ivanovic (Dead by Daylight); Matthew Lillard, Beth Toussaint, Neve Campbell, Liev Schreiber, Courteney Cox, David Arquette, Skeet Ulrich, Lynn McRee (2000) (Note: In Scream 3, Ghostface is also voiced by these actors when the character uses their voice changer to impersonate another character.); Matthew Lillard (2022) (Note: In Scream (2022), Lillard voices Ghostface in the film within a film Stab 8.)
- Stunt actors: Several actors: Lee Waddell (1996–1997); Dane Farwell (1996–1997, 2011); Tony Cecere (1996); Allen Robinson (1997); Chris Durand (1997); Chris Doyle (1997); TJ White (1997); Ted Barba (1997); Rick Barker (1997); Kurt Bryant (1997); Brian Avery (2000, 2015); Jeff Brockton (2000); Stanton Barrett (2015); Alec Rayme (2016); William Scharpf (2019); Keith Ward (2022); Paul Burke (2022); Max Laferriere (2023); Mathieu Coderre (2023); Jeremy Conner (2026); Paul O'Connor (2026)

In-universe information
- Aliases: The Voice; Father Death; The Icon of Halloween
- Nationality: American
- Pathology: Serial killer
- Signature weapon: Buck 120 knife
- M.O.: Taunting victims with phone calls, stabbing, throat slitting, disemboweling
- Notable adversary: Sidney Prescott; Gale Weathers; Dewey Riley; Kirby Reed; Sam Carpenter; Tara Carpenter; Chad and Mindy Meeks-Martin; Tatum Evans
- Location: United States (Note: Including: Woodsboro, California; Windsor College, Ohio; Hollywood, California; Atlanta, Georgia; New York, New York)

Ghostface (alternatively stylized as Ghost Face or GhostFace) is an identity that is adopted by the main antagonists of the Scream franchise. The figure was originally created by Kevin Williamson, and is primarily mute in person but voiced over the phone by Roger L. Jackson, regardless of who is behind the mask (as all killers use a voice changer utilizing that exact voice, starting in person with Scream). The disguise has been adopted by various characters in the movies and in the third season of the television series.

Ghostface debuted in Scream (1996) as a disguise used by teenagers Billy Loomis (Skeet Ulrich) and Stu Macher (Matthew Lillard), during their killing spree in the fictional town of Woodsboro, particularly targeting Sidney Prescott (Neve Campbell). The mask was a popular Halloween costume created and designed by Fun World costume company before being chosen by Marianne Maddalena and Craven for the film. The identity is used primarily as a disguise for the antagonists of each film to conceal their identities while conducting serial murders, and as such has been portrayed by several actors.

In the Scream universe, the costume is not unique and is easily obtainable, allowing others to wear a similar outfit. In the first movie, the costume is shown in packaging labeled "Father Death". Ghostface often calls their targets to taunt or threaten them, using a voice changer to hide their true identity. Later installments utilize modern technology of the time to taunt and pursue victims. Because the identity beneath the mask constantly shifts, Ghostface lacks a single, definitive motivation; their triggers range from revenge and fame-seeking to peer pressure. However, every iteration is a sadist whose thrill of the kill is fueled by a twisted obsession with horror movies and the ongoing continuity of the film series. The events of the first film provide worldwide fame and notoriety to the survivors, and the new Ghostface killers have motives that may sometimes be connected to the in-universe Stab film series, loose adaptations of the tell-all books about previous Ghostface killings by Gale Weathers (Courteney Cox). Sidney is often the main target for almost all the films, while Samantha "Sam" Carpenter (Melissa Barrera) and her half-sister, Tara (Jenna Ortega) are primarily targeted in the fifth and sixth films.

The Ghostface persona remains the same throughout the Scream film series, featuring a black hood and cloak with a jagged base and a white rubber mask resembling a ghost with an anguished expression. Though each iteration of Ghostface is human, they often exhibit extreme durability against physical harm, high levels of physical strength, and an almost supernatural stealth ability, able to appear and disappear in seemingly impossible situations.

In the 2015–2016 television series Scream, Ghostface was replaced by The Lakewood Slasher (created by the series' writers Jill Blotevogel, Dan Dworkin and Jay Beattie), who appeared in the series for the first two seasons, and by The Shallow Grove Slasher (created by Brian Sieve and Eoghan O'Donnell), who appeared in only the Halloween Special episodes of the second season; both are voiced by Mike Vaughn (who credited in the series' end credits as "The Voice"), due to licensing issues. The original Ghostface persona returned in Scream: Resurrection, once again voiced by Roger L. Jackson, replacing Vaughn. In the films, Ghostface has appeared in all entries to date, returning most recently in Scream 7, with Jackson reprising his role, also credited as "The Voice" in the film series' ending credits.

The character has become a popular culture icon since its inception, referenced in film and television as well as spawning a series of action figures and merchandise, as well as parodies and titular spoofs, most notably in the Scary Movie franchise, where Ghostface is voiced by Dave Sheridan.

== Appearances ==
=== Films ===
Stu Macher (left) and Billy Loomis, the original Ghostface killers

Ghostface first appears in the opening scene of Scream (1996). The character, voiced by Roger L. Jackson, calls and taunts teenager Casey Becker (Drew Barrymore) with horror clichés and trivia questions, before murdering her boyfriend Steve Orth (Kevin Patrick Walls) and then her. The identity has been adopted by the primary antagonists of each successive film to conceal their identities, prior to being revealed in each film's final act.

In the original Scream, the identity is used by a killer stalking the fictional town of Woodsboro, California. After the murder spree begins, Sidney Prescott (Neve Campbell) begins receiving taunting and threatening phone calls from Ghostface, who claims knowledge of her mother Maureen Prescott (Lynn McRee)'s brutal rape and murder, one year prior to the events of the film, a murder that was blamed on Cotton Weary (Liev Schreiber). The Ghostface disguise allows suspicion to fall on many people, including Sidney's boyfriend, Billy Loomis (Skeet Ulrich); her father, Neil Prescott (Lawrence Hecht); her friend, Randy Meeks (Jamie Kennedy); and her schoolmate, Stu Macher (Matthew Lillard). Ghostface is revealed in the finale as both Billy and Stu, who reveal that they murdered Sidney's mother and framed Cotton. Billy cites his motivation as abandonment by his mother, brought about by his father's affair with Maureen, while Stu initially claims he embarked on the spree for fun, but later ultimately cites "peer pressure". As the two killers reveal their plan to frame Sidney's father for their killing spree, reporter Gale Weathers (Courteney Cox) suddenly appears and attempts to shoot them with their gun, only for Billy to knock her out and prepare to kill her. However, he and Stu suddenly realize that while Gale was engaging them, Sidney managed to escape. Sidney ultimately turns the tables against Billy and Stu, temporarily adopting the Ghostface persona herself to taunt them with a phone call, revealing that she called the police on them and thus foiled their plan to get away with their killing spree, leaving the two killers shocked, horrified, and enraged. Briefly dressing up as Ghostface, Sidney attacks and knocks out Billy with an umbrella and then engages in a fight with Stu, ultimately killing him by dropping a television on his head. Gale shoots Billy to stop him from killing Sidney, who then finishes Billy off with a bullet to the head, citing the fact that "They ALWAYS come back", a common horror cliché, and one of the many tropes taught to her by Randy Meeks, who is obsessed with horror and openly listed these clichés earlier in the film during a party.

Ghostface's second appearance was in Scream 2 (1997) where it was again used as a disguise by the main antagonists. A series of murders occur at Windsor College, Sidney's current location, with the initial victims sharing names with Billy and Stu's victims from Scream. The killers again taunt Sidney and attempt to kill her, and later kill Randy. The Ghostface disguise allows suspicion to fall on several characters, including Cotton again, and Sidney's boyfriend Derek Feldman (Jerry O'Connell). However, Mickey Altieri (Timothy Olyphant), a friend of Derek, reveals himself as the killer, seeking fame for his prolific exploits. Mickey's accomplice is revealed to be Billy's mother (Laurie Metcalf), under the alias Debbie Salt, who is seeking revenge against Sidney for her son's death, while showing unwillingness to accept her own faults as a mother which included abandoning Billy, which Sidney points out during their confrontation. Mrs. Loomis shoots Mickey, claiming to have indulged his desire for fame only to enlist his help in enacting her revenge, and tries to kill Sidney, only for Sidney to fight back. Just as Mrs. Loomis ultimately prepares to kill Sidney, Cotton suddenly arrives, and Mrs. Loomis tries to manipulate him into letting her kill Sidney, but to her shock, she fails to do so and Cotton instead shoots Mrs. Loomis in the neck. Seconds later, Mickey springs to his feet screaming but is quickly shot to death by Gale and Sidney. Sidney then shoots Mrs. Loomis in the head, saying "just in case".

In Scream 3 (2000), a new Ghostface killer murders Cotton and his girlfriend Christine Hamilton (Kelly Rutherford) in an attempt to discover the now-hidden Sidney's location. The killer murders the cast of "Stab 3", the film within a film based on Sidney and her experiences with Ghostface, while leaving images of Maureen at the crime scenes to draw Sidney out of seclusion. Ghostface is later revealed as Sidney's half-brother, film director Roman Bridger (Scott Foley), born to their mother Maureen during a two-year period when she moved to Hollywood to become an actress under the name Rina Reynolds. After being gang-raped and impregnated at a party, she gave Roman up for adoption; Roman sought her out years later, only to be rejected, telling him that he's Rina's child. Roman began stalking Maureen and filming her relationships with other men, including Hank Loomis. He used this footage to reveal to Billy why his mother had abandoned him before convincing him to kill Maureen, sparking the chain of events in Scream and Scream 2. As Roman rants on his motive and desire to frame and kill Sidney for "stealing the life she took from him", Sidney shuts him up, saying that she's heard those rants before from other killers and that he simply kills people because he chose to, provoking an enraged Roman into fighting Sidney, which she eventually wins by outsmarting Roman and stabbing him in the back and chest, while Gale and Dewey Riley (David Arquette) arrive shortly after and discover his identity, ruining Roman's plans of framing Sidney for his crimes. A defeated Roman briefly connects with Sidney by holding her hand, but then attempts to attack once more. Dewey manages to ultimately kill Roman with Sidney's help, ending the series of murders based on his revenge against Maureen.

In the director's commentary, the Stab 3 "Sidney Prescott" actress Angelina Tyler (Emily Mortimer) is revealed to have been a second killer and Roman's lover, with the scenes revealing her survival and true allegiances after apparently being killed by Ghostface having been cut; Wes Craven elaborated that an earlier scene in the film where Sidney came across Angelina wearing Ghostface gear in her dressing room, which Angelina had passed off as still wearing due to just having come off of set, was Sidney unknowingly actually having caught Angelina in the act of changing into her Ghostface gear, furthermore leaving it ambiguous as to whether or not Angelina was actually dead or could return; in the subsequent Scream Trilogy box set booklet, Angelina is not listed among the deceased characters after the events of Scream 3. However, this is contradicted in a scene in Scream VI, listing Roman Bridger as the only Ghostface in the Hollywood killings. Ghostface is also voiced by Foley, Schreiber, Lynn McRee, Campbell, Cox, Arquette, Beth Toussaint, and Ulrich via a voice changer used to impersonate them.

In Scream 4 (2011), another Ghostface killer emerges in Woodsboro on the 15th anniversary of the massacre conducted by Billy and Stu; the new killer recreates events from the incident but also films the murders to create a snuff film. Ghostface kills several teenagers and police officers before being unmasked as Sidney's cousin Jill Roberts (Emma Roberts) and her friend Charlie Walker (Rory Culkin), who intend to kill Sidney, frame Jill's ex-boyfriend Trevor Sheldon (Nico Tortorella), and become the current generation's "Sidney Prescott" and "Randy Meeks" with the accompanying fame of being the "survivors" of the massacre, as Jill was jealous of Sidney's experiences with Ghostface. Jill betrays Charlie and fatally stabs him through the heart, wishing to become the sole survivor, and after admitting to Sidney that she really is a sick, evil woman who was willing to kill her own mother Kate (Mary McDonnell) to get what she wants, declaring that "sick is the new sane", she then seemingly kills Sidney before purposely injuring and stabbing herself to make herself appear a victim of Ghostface. After being taken to the hospital, Jill's plans end up backfiring when Dewey informs her that Sidney has survived. An enraged Jill makes a desperate attempt to kill Sidney, but is stalled by Dewey, Gale, and Judy Hicks (Marley Shelton) long enough for Sidney to electrocute her on the head with a defibrillator, saying that Jill forgot the first rule of remakes, "Don't fuck with the original". An injured Jill attempts to stab Sidney with a piece of broken glass in a last-ditch attempt to finish her off, but Sidney anticipates this and shoots Jill through the heart, finally killing her, while Jill's status as the "sole surviving hero" ultimately becomes short-lived.

In Scream (2022), 25 years after the original Woodsboro massacre, a new Ghostface killer strikes by attacking a young girl named Tara Carpenter (Jenna Ortega) at her house, leaving her hospitalized, while Tara's estranged sister, Sam Carpenter (Melissa Barrera), who is revealed to be the illegitimate daughter of one of the original Ghostface killers, Billy Loomis, arrives at Woodsboro to protect Tara. Immediately after Sam's arrival, Ghostface continues to attack and kill more people, with the initial victims being people related to Billy and Stu's original killing spree, and manages to ultimately kill Dewey, causing Sidney and Gale to join Sam and Tara as they attempt to put an end to the killings to avenge Dewey. Ghostface is later revealed to be both Sam's boyfriend Richie Kirsch (Jack Quaid) and Tara's friend Amber Freeman (Mikey Madison), who are revealed to be two obsessive and toxic fans of the in-universe horror film series Stab. Having been disappointed with recent installments (including one directed by Rian Johnson), they chose to commit a killing spree in the hopes of inspiring a real-life "requel" (half reboot, half sequel) of the franchise, believing they're "real fans" that can save the Stab franchise by "restoring" it to its normal formula, while intending to frame Sam for their crimes. In the ensuing confrontation, Amber fights against Sidney and Gale, who ultimately gain the upper hand, and Gale shoots Amber as she cowardly pleads for mercy, causing her to fall straight into a burning kitchen stove and be set on fire. As Richie pursues Sam while gloating that "villains like Sam die at the end", Sam introduces a new rule to Richie, "Never fuck with the daughter of a serial killer", and violently stabs Richie in the exact same manner of Ghostface stabbing a victim. As a wounded and frightened Richie pleads for his life and asks about "his ending", Sam fatally slashes his throat, and then shoots Richie in the head to make sure he does not "come back". A horribly-burnt Amber resurfaces to attack the group once more, but is ultimately shot in the head by Tara. It is later revealed in the next movie that even though Gale wrote a book about the recent events despite her promise not to, a film adaptation of the book is not set to be made, officially destroying Richie and Amber's plan.

In Scream VI (2023), one year later, a new Ghostface killer arrives in New York City, killing two film students, Jason Carvey (Tony Revolori) and his best friend Greg Bruckner (Thom Newell), just as they attempted to start their own Ghostface spree to finish "Richie's film". Ghostface then begins to specifically target Sam, who has moved to New York with Tara and their surviving friends and is currently ostracized in public due to an online rumor claiming that Sam was the mastermind of the recent Woodsboro killing spree, and also targets anyone else close to Sam and random civilians that interfere with the killer, while leaving other Ghostface masks at the crime scenes. Eventually, Sam and the group, including a survivor of the 2011 killing spree, Kirby Reed (Hayden Panettiere), lure Ghostface to an abandoned cinema containing various pieces of evidence in lockup from past Ghostface killings to make a Ghostface shrine, and in the ensuing confrontation, Ghostface is revealed to be three people: police detective Wayne Bailey (Dermot Mulroney) and two of the group's roommates, Ethan (Jack Champion) and Quinn (Liana Liberato). The three reveal themselves to be Richie's family, who desire to get revenge on the one who killed him, spreading rumors of Sam being the mastermind of the previous murders to assassinate her character, and then killing Sam after framing her for their crimes, while also having killed Jason and Greg to prevent their plans from interfering with their own. As the Bailey family corners Sam and Tara, Bailey angrily declares that anyone who was responsible for his son's death and "fucked with the Bailey family" must suffer and die, and tries to force Sam into putting on her father's mask so she can die as a killer like her father Billy. However, Sam and Tara ultimately gain the upper hand after Sam taunts them with the fact that Richie never managed to kill a lot of victims himself (Amber committed the majority of the murders), before having died cowardly and pleading for his life. In the ensuing fight, Tara seriously wounds Ethan by stabbing him in the mouth and Sam kills Quinn by shooting her in the head, while Bailey is knocked unconscious. When he wakes up, Bailey finds himself receiving a phone call from Ghostface, who taunts him over his motives and soon emerges to attack a now-frightened Bailey and stab him multiple times, before unmasking herself as Sam. Sam considers letting Wayne live, declaring to him that she's better than her father Billy as he was nothing but a selfish murderer, but then throws Bailey's motive onto him by reminding him that he "fucked with her family", and ultimately kills Bailey by stabbing him in the eye. Soon after, a wounded Ethan attempts to attack once more, only for Kirby to push a damaged TV (the same one that killed Stu Macher years ago) onto Ethan's head, killing him.

In Scream 7 (2026), a new Ghostface killer starts a new spree at Stu Macher's house, which has since been turned into a tourist attraction, killing tourists Scott (Jimmy Tatro) and Madison (Michelle Randolph) and destroying the house by setting it on fire. Ghostface then heads to Pine Grove, Indiana, where Sidney currently lives at with her daughter Tatum (Isabel May) and husband Mark Evans (Joel McHale), and embarks on another violent killing spree while specifically targeting Sidney, forgoing the use of taunting phone calls in favor of sending video messages of deceased original Ghostface killer Stu Macher (as well as other killers like Nancy Loomis and Roman Bridger, and her close friend Dewey Riley, at one point), created using highly realistic deepfake AI technology, and inspired by dozens of rumors that Stu survived the original killing spree. After dozens of murders, Ghostface captures Tatum and holds her and Mark hostage to draw Sidney out, and it is there that Ghostface is revealed to be Sidney's neighbor Jessica Bowden (Anna Camp), with her accomplice being Marco (Ethan Embry), a computer expert and employee of a mental institution, who is also revealed to have broken out an escaped murderer named Karl to attack Sidney and her family as Ghostface earlier, before being killed by being run over by a car driven by Gale Weathers, Mindy and Chad. Jessica reveals that she was inspired by Sidney's book to kill her husband, whom she claims was abusive, having grown to see Sidney as an unstoppable "final girl", but has now lost faith in Sidney due to her not helping to stop the Ghostface murders in New York. Now desiring to punish Sidney for being "past her prime", Jessica and Marco plan to kill Sidney and have Tatum replace her as the new "final girl", while hinting they might take Tatum for themselves, having killed Jessica's own son Lucas (Asa Germann), who Jessica cold-heartedly admits she killed because he reminded her of her husband. However, with the help of a wounded Mark, Tatum manages to escape from the killers' clutches, allowing Sidney to kill Marco by shooting him in the head and then pursue Jessica, engaging in a vicious fight with her. Sidney quickly destroys Jessica's delusions by getting the upper hand in the fight and stabbing her several times, while Tatum assists her mother by shooting Jessica down. With her delusions shattered, Jessica ragefully tries to kill the two in one last desperate attack, but is ultimately killed herself when both Sidney and Tatum shoot her multiple times in the head.

=== Television series ===
Ghostface appears with a different mask and under the name the Lakewood Slasher (voiced by Mike Vaughn) in the anthology television slasher series Scream. Emma Duvall (Willa Fitzgerald) and her friends are stalked and murdered by someone wearing the disguise. In the end, the killer is revealed to be Emma's half-sister, Piper (Amelia Rose Blaire), who was given up for adoption at birth by Emma's mother Maggie (Tracy Middendorf), and wanted revenge for Emma getting what she never had. Piper and Emma have a struggle before Piper gets the upper hand, but Audrey (Bex Taylor-Klaus), one of Emma's best friends, shoots Piper in the chest and she falls in the lake. She surfaces, only for Emma to finish her off with a bullet to the head.

Appearing in the second season, the new Lakewood Slasher killer begins harassing Audrey and Emma, and the survivors of the first massacre. In the end, he's revealed to be Kieran (Amadeus Serafini), Emma's boyfriend. A chase ends with Emma and Audrey getting the upper hand, but Emma decides to let him rot in prison instead of killing him. The police arrive and arrest Kieran. However, Kieran was murdered by an unknown killer. In the series' special Halloween episodes, a new killer named Shallow Grove Slasher (also voiced by Vaughn) and later revealed: Tom Martin (Alexander Calvert), who using his fake identity name as Alex Whitten, attempt to murder Emma and her friends who are on vacation at Shallow Grove Island. In the end, Emma kills Tom by falling off the balcony.

Ghostface appeared in the third and final season, titled Scream: Resurrection, premiered on VH1 on July 8, 2019, with Roger L. Jackson reprising his role. In this season, the killers wear the Fun World mask and are revealed in the episode "Endgame": Beth (Giorgia Whigham) and Jamal "Jay" Elliot (Tyga), who is the older half-brother of main character Marcus Elliot (RJ Cyler).

=== Video games ===
Ghostface, under the alias the "Ghost Face", appears as a killer in the asymmetrical multiplayer survival horror game, Dead by Daylight, voiced by Filip Ivanovic. He was added via the Ghost Face DLC released on June 18, 2019. This version is Danny Johnson, also known by the pseudonym Jed Olsen, a narcissistic freelance newspaper journalist from the fictional town of Roseville, Florida, who covers the Ghostface murders by day and commits them by night. Johnson was created for the game because the developers were only able to acquire the license for the mask, which is separate from the one for the character, as the films used a pre-existing mask. Players can access different styles of the mask for Ghostface as well.

Ghostface appears as a playable operator in Season Six of Call of Duty: Black Ops Cold War and Call of Duty: Warzone, voiced again by Roger L. Jackson.

In April 2022, Ghostface was added in an update as a free playable skin for a limited time in the online multiplayer social deduction game Among Us.

In July 2024, it was announced that Ghostface would appear as a playable character in Mortal Kombat 1 via the "Khaos Reigns" DLC, coming with Roger L. Jackson reprising his role. His inclusion has inspired numerous internet memes, with users humorously highlighting the improbability of Ghostface standing a real chance in a fight against the roster of Mortal Kombat characters and fellow guest fighters featured in the game and its predecessors.

Ghostface is a usable skin in the online game Hunt: Showdown as of October 24, 2024, under the title of the DLC package named "Ghost Face Rampage".

On October 10th 2025, Ghostface came to the online game Fortnite as a purchasable skin from the shop as part of 2025's version of "Fortnitemares", the game's annual Halloween event. For a limited time, players can receive an in-game "Last Call" weapon, consisting of a 90s payphone and Ghostface's iconic knife. The item also transforms the player wielding it into Ghostface himself, allowing them to stalk other players as a reference to the killer's identity being assumed by different people. Roger L. Jackson reprises his role for all spoken Ghostface lines.

=== Music videos ===
Jackson reprised his role as Ghostface through archival audio recordings from Scream in Creed's "What If" which is set at Sunrise Studios where Dewey, once again played by David Arquette, works late night security until Ghostface calls him at 11:36 pm and a female survivor telling him someone's coming for her which in turn leads to Dewey searching around the studio lot to find Ghostface. However after arriving at the scene towards the end of the video, Dewey discovers that the alleged Ghostface sighting was the band's prank while the real killer jumps from above to attack him.

Jackson once again reprised his role as Ghostface in the second part of the music video "Twisting the Knife" by Ice Nine Kills featuring the song's guest artist and star of Scream 7, Mckenna Grace and original Scream actor David Arquette appears as the video's fictional director. After completing on set for the shooting of the song's music video, Ghostface kills Arquette and Francis Rizzowitz (Johnny Brennan), before Ghostface unmasked as the character named the Silence and the video ends with the caption "To be continued ...".

== Concept and creation ==
An original mold for the Ghostface mask based on Fun World's design but with significant differences, including more pronounced features, in order to avoid copyright issues

The Ghostface costume is the outfit worn by the main antagonists of the Scream franchise, consisting of a rubber white mask with black eyes, nose, and mouth and black, cloth-like material; a hooded robe, with faux-tatters draping from the arms; and a spiked trim to the base of the outfit. In the movie, the costume is considered common and easily purchasable, making identifying the buyers difficult and creating the possibility for anyone to be the killer.

The Ghostface mask was first developed for novelty stores during the Halloween season between 1991 and 1992 by Fun World, as part of a series entitled "Fantastic Faces", the mask itself known as "The Peanut-Eyed Ghost", with the final design approved by Fun World vice-president Allan Geller; the design was adapted from a "wailer" ghost mask created by Alterian, Inc. artist Loren Gitthens in 1990 and 1991. Craven claimed to have originally found the mask but later clarified that he had misremembered the event and that it was producer Marianne Maddalena who discovered it. She found it while inside a house during location scouting for the film and brought it to the attention of Craven, who set about trying to obtain the rights to use it. Fun World licensing director R.J. Torbert joined Fun World in 1996 and was given the task of naming the mask prior to its film debut, deciding on "GhostFace" with the blessing of Fun World owners Stanley and Allan Geller. Torbert felt it looked like a "ghost in pain", believing it to be a unique design. The Ghostface design and title are owned by Fun World.

The design of the mask bears reference to Edvard Munch's painting The Scream, the film poster to Pink Floyd's The Wall, the ghostly characters that appeared in the 1930s Betty Boop cartoons, and Season 1 Scooby-Doo, Where Are You! ghosts in the episode "A Night Of Fright Is No Delight". The mask is stark white and depicts a caricature of someone screaming and crying at the same time. Designer Sleiertin stated that the mask displayed different emotions, "It's a horrible look, it's a sorry look, it's a frantic look" and has specified that it was not inspired by The Scream. Since the appearance of Ghostface in Scream, the costume has become the most worn and sold costume for Halloween in the United States.

The initial script labeled the main antagonist as "masked killer" with no specifications to its appearance, forcing Craven and his staff to produce the costume eventually worn by Ghostface as they were shooting. Craven asked Greg Nicotero and Howard Berger of design company KNB Effects to produce a mask specifically for the film based on the Fun World design, but did not like the final result. After Fun World and Dimension Films were able to complete an agreement for the use of the Ghostface mask, Craven was able to use the original design as he wanted. The custom mask made by KNB Effects still appears in the scenes involving the murders of Casey Becker and Principal Himbry, as filming of these scenes completed prior to the finalization of the deal between Fun World and Dimension Films.

We came with an assortment of masks that had the Ghostface look. Of the entire assortment, that face was the strongest one. The design definitely had something that made it outstanding from the others.

— Brigitte Sleiertin on choosing the final design for what became Ghostface

The Ghostface masks as seen in (top left-bottom right) Scream, Scream 2, Scream 3 and Scream 4

The 1991–92 "Fantastic Faces" edition of the mask used in Scream is made of thin, white rubber with blackened eyes, nose, and mouth. Despite being fictionally a character in the movie cast, in the first, second, and fourth films, the costume was most often worn by stunt performer Dane Farwell, who gave the character specific characteristics such as cleaning the knife after killing, also giving the stature and a unique movement to the character. In the first film, Craven wore the costume during the opening murder scene, where the character is struck by a phone, and by Ulrich only once during a finale scene, where the character prepares to murder Randy. Despite Stu wearing the costume in the film, actor Lillard never actually wore the outfit. Scream 2 features a slightly redesigned version of the mask from the "Fearsome Faces" line, possessing slightly altered eyes and an indented chin. Following Scream 2, the Ghostface mask became part of the "Ghostface" line of masks featuring several variations of the design including glow-in-the-dark models. The plain, white version of the Ghostface line mask is used in Scream 3 by Bridger. Another edition of the mask was developed for use by Ghostface in Scream 4, dubbed "The Deluxe Edition Mask"; again, similar to the original Ghostface design, but constructed of thicker rubber with a pearlescent finish.

Following the description in Williamson's script of a "ghost mask", Craven and designers had originally intended to use a white motif, creating a white cloak and hood for the killer's costume. It was the intervention of Maddalena, who felt that the cloak would be scarier if it was black, that resulted in the dark costume shown on screen. The cloak itself had to be custom-made for the film, as the "Father Death" outfit identified in Scream as that of the killers did not really exist; the Fun World mask was sold only as a stand-alone item. The cloak entered into retail markets only following the release of Scream. Each cloak was estimated to cost $700 to hand-produce by a seamstress and was made of a heavy, thick, black material, with reflective threads woven throughout, creating a subtle glimmer. The cloak was created to help conceal the identity of the killers by covering most of their visible bodies, as it was believed that otherwise audiences would be able to guess which character was involved by his or her clothing and body-shape.

The knife used by Ghostface in the films is a custom prop knife based on the Buck 120 Hunting Knife. The knife blades are made of aluminum or chrome-paint-coated plastic with a rubber handle, depending on the scenario for which they are needed. The handle is black with a silver metallic appearance for the tip. The Buck 120 knife was chosen as the model for the Ghostface weapon because of the large blade it features.

== Characterization ==
Ghostface is rarely depicted as speaking while physically on screen in order to aid in concealing the identity of the character behind the mask. Exceptions to this are grunts and groans when injured, which are dubbed into the film during the editing phase by Jackson. Ghostface only speaks physically on-screen on four occasions in the series; on the first two occasions, it is just before his true identity is revealed; the third occasion is the hospital scene in Scream (2022); the fourth occasion is the opening sequence in Scream VI. The voice given to the character, provided by Jackson, is used when talking to another character over the phone or to display the use of the voice changer when the killer reveals himself. Despite being portrayed by different characters in each film, Ghostface displays similar personality and physical attributes regardless of who is wearing the costume or speaking to a target, such as taunting his victims over the telephone, the ritualistic cleaning of his knife after a kill, slashing the throat of his victims before killing them by stabbing, almost superhuman strength and durability, and grunts and groans when injured.

Ghostface is first referred to by that name in the first movie, when character Tatum Riley, played by Rose McGowan, calls the masked killer "Mr. Ghostface", prior to her death.

I can't imagine Scream without Ghostface... Roger Jackson's voice is very remarkable, it's got an evil sophistication.

— Wes Craven on returning to Scream 4

Ghostface is often shown to taunt his targets, initially representing himself as charming and even flirtatious when speaking. His conversations turn confrontational and intimidating, using his knowledge of other characters or graphically describing his intentions before appearing to the target physically. Craven considers Jackson's voice performance as Ghostface to have "evil sophistication". When confronting his intended victim, Ghostface is portrayed in varying ways, sometimes quick and efficient and other times clumsy, falling, or colliding with objects that hinder his pursuit, a characteristic that varies based upon who is wearing the costume. Whoever inhabits the costume, Ghostface taunts its victims and prolongs a kill when it appears to have an advantage. The Billy/Stu Ghostface would gut its victims after killing them; this was not performed on Tatum Riley who was killed in a mechanical garage door. This Ghostface, in particular, would ask its victim questions about horror films and employ the tropes of the genre in its attacks, displaying a detachment from reality and aligned with the same self-awareness of the film itself which toys with the expectations of the horror genre. The second Ghostface, created by Mickey and Mrs. Loomis, would repeatedly stab its victim to death but often in a public place or with witnesses. The third Ghostface, created by Roman, preferred more clean kills with precise stabbings, and used theatricality and movie props to attack his victims, using a voice changer that allowed him to sound like many other people, casting suspicion and doubt on other characters. In addition, he would use images and the synthesized voice of Maureen to specifically taunt Sidney, even shrouding himself in a bloodied, crime scene cover, alluding to the murder of Maureen, to fool Sidney into believing that she was losing her sanity. The fourth Ghostface, created by Jill and Charlie, filmed each murder on web cameras hidden around the environment and spy cameras in its mask. Charlie mostly repeatedly stabbed his victims to death in a more vicious and brutal fashion and would go further and gut them if he wanted, while Jill mostly stabbed only once. The two killers also made some of the murders public to gain the attention of the world press. The fifth Ghostface, created by Richie and Amber, mainly focused on brutally attacking and injuring victims in Amber's case, while killing most of them in a swift manner, usually by a neck stab, in Richie's. The sixth Ghostface, created by Richie's family, committed violent murders and attacks on either the ones close to Sam Carpenter or anyone standing in the way, while leaving the masks of previous Ghostface killers at the scene of the crime afterwards. The seventh Ghostface, created by Jessica and her accomplice Marco, while still embarking on a violent spree like previous killers, focuses less on phone calls and uses AI recreations of past killers, mainly Stu Macher, to taunt Sidney in video messages.

The motivations for Ghostface's killing vary in each film and are respective to each killer wearing the costume. Billy claimed to have been driven to insanity by his mother's abandonment, an incident he blamed on Maureen, and after taking his revenge on her chose to continue his spree, leading towards her daughter Sidney, while Stu lists peer pressure as his motivation. In Scream 2, Mrs. Loomis cites her motivation as simple revenge against the person she holds responsible for her son's death, while Mickey desires the fame that his involvement in the killings will garner when he is caught. In Scream 3, Roman seeks revenge for what he sees as his mother's rejection and abandonment by engineering Maureen's death and trying to kill Sidney, seeing her as having the family-life he was denied. In Scream 4, Jill, jealous of Sidney, wished to obtain similar fame as the sole survivor of a new massacre, while Charlie aided her both for those reasons and his love for Jill. In Scream (2022), Richie and Amber, who are shown to be extremely toxic fans of the Stab franchise, start a huge killing spree in an effort to inspire a ninth Stab film that goes back to the franchise's old formula, having hated the eighth film (which was written and directed by Rian Johnson) for its new storytelling elements that stepped away from the old formula. In Scream VI, Detective Wayne Bailey and his son and daughter, Ethan and Quinn, who are revealed to be Richie's family, desire to get revenge on the one who killed Richie by assassinating her character and framing her for a new killing spree. In Scream 7, Jessica and Marco, believing that Sidney has lost her status as a "final girl", desire to punish her by killing her and having her daughter Tatum take her place as the "final girl", while hinting at taking her for themselves to raise her as a "Sidney 2.0".

In costume, the Ghostfaces share a ritualistic mannerism of gripping the blade of its knife between thumb and forefinger and wiping it clean of any blood following a murder by drawing its hand from handle to the tip of the knife. This characteristic was given to the character by stuntman Dane Farwell who wore the costume for many of its scenes in Scream. Each killer is depicted as possessing effective physical abilities, such as the capabilities of nearly flawless stealth, prowling without being detected, moving silently, and efficiently vanishing from its targets' defense. Additionally, the killer tends to display sufficient strength that allows them to overpower victims, such as in Scream 2, in regards to defeating two trained detectives single-handedly. Ghostface is shown to be able to sustain and even ignore severe levels of physical damage, surviving blunt trauma, stabbing wounds and gunshots. While Stu, Mrs. Loomis, Charlie, Richie, Quinn, Wayne, and Marco were all killed instantly in one blow, Billy, Mickey, Roman, Jill, Amber, Ethan, and Jessica, despite having sustained severe injuries prior, all survived to make one final, desperate attack before finally being killed by the heroes.

== Legacy and cultural impact ==
2011 Ghostface figurine by NECA toys for Scream 4, displaying the full-length robe worn by the character

McFarlane Toys produced a 6-inch figurine of Ghostface in 1999 for the "Movie Maniacs II" series of horror and science fiction inspired line of character models. A series of figures were produced by NECA for Scream 4 featuring the standard mask and black cowl plus variations such as "Zombie Ghostface" with a decayed appearance on the mask and "Scarecrow Ghostface" with brown, burlap material used for the mask and clothing.

Ghostface has been parodied and referenced numerous times in media following his appearance in the Scream franchise, most prominently in the parody film Scary Movie (2000) where a killer dressed as Ghostface commits a series of murders. However, unlike the original film, the killer is revealed to be a single person, Doofy Gilmore, who is played by Dave Sheridan, who also provides Ghostface's voice. Sheridan would reprise his role in the self-titled sixth film in 2026. This parodic version of Ghostface later appears in the June 1, 2016 Erma comic strip, named "Prank Call", wherein the character is making prank calls whilst quoting Scream, alongside the series' titular character. In the parody film Shriek If You Know What I Did Last Friday the 13th (2000), a killer wearing a Jason Voorhees-style hockey mask is set on fire, his mask melting to resemble that of Ghostface. The film Jay and Silent Bob Strike Back (2001) features Ghostface, as Shannen Doherty and Craven provide cameos as themselves making the then non-existent Scream 4, but Doherty objects when Ghostface turns out to be played by the orangutan, Suzann.

As in film, Ghostface has been referenced repeatedly in various television programs and commercials. In the same year as the release of Scream 3, the mask made an appearance on Beverly Hills, 90210 and the Nickelodeon series Cousin Skeeter. It was also used as an ornament in the bedroom of Dawson Leery in Dawson's Creek, a show created by Scream writer, Williamson. The character appears in a 1999 episode of Celebrity Deathmatch entitled "The Unknown Murderer", where he threatens to kill a scream queen every round, murdering Barrymore, Jamie Lee Curtis, and Jennifer Love Hewitt before planting his cell phone on a platypus to frame him, causing Campbell and Sarah Michelle Gellar to fight it. The mask was later used in The Sopranos episode "Fortunate Son" (2001) where it is worn by the character Christopher Moltisanti to commit a robbery.

The costume is referenced in an episode of the television series Boomtown entitled "All Hallow's Eve" (2002) where a police officer uses the costume to frighten a bully who has been terrorizing other kids. In the Japanese anime FLCL episode "Marquis de Cabras" (2003), protagonist Naota's face changes to resemble that of Ghostface frequently during a scene where he and his family are eating spicy curry. The character makes a cameo appearance in Tripping the Rift in the episode "The Devil and a Guy Named Webster" (2004) as the judge when Chode sells his soul to the devil and finds a way to sue him. He also appears in a 2004 advert for Trivial Pursuit: '90s edition; representing iconic characters of the 1990s alongside Dennis Rodman and the character Rose from the 1997 film Titanic. A parody of Ghostface appears in the television series All Grown Up! episode "Interview with a Campfire" (2004) where Lil DeVille is taunted by phone and stalked by a character wearing an Easter Bunny mask.

The character appears briefly in The Simpsons episode "Home Away from Homer" (2005) where Homer Simpson suggests him as a babysitter for his daughter Maggie Simpson. Roger L. Jackson lends his voice to Ghostface in the Robot Chicken episode "That Hurts Me" (2005) alongside other famous film killers in a show that parodies Big Brother, launching a prank war against Pinhead and Freddy Krueger before giving a speech to save himself from elimination from the show. He is referenced by Kenny Powers, the main character of Eastbound & Down who requests to wear the mask while having sex. In Scream XXX: A porn parody, a new Ghostface (wearing a clown variant of the Father Death mask) begins murdering the cast and crew of an in-production pornographic parody of the Stab series. The gay pornography film Moan, features a parody of Ghostface that does not wear a mask. Instead, he has a hood and facepaint that resembles the mask.

In his book Going to Pieces: The Rise and Fall of the Slasher Film, Adam Rockoff opined that Ghostface's mask was a "striking, surreal and downright terrifying presence". Calling the mask a "hyperbolic rendering" of Edvard Munch's The Scream, Rockoff wrote that the face is "twisted in an exaggerated, almost mocking grin, as if reflecting the look of terror and surprise on his victims' faces." Tony Magistrale also discussed the similarities between Ghostface's mask and The Scream in his book Abject Terrors: Surveying the Modern and Postmodern Horror Film, stating that the painting, "an apt representation of the degree of alienation from other people, inspires the killers' murderous agenda".
