= Samantha Carpenter =

Fictional character in the Scream franchise

Sam Carpenter
- Scream character
- Melissa Barrera as Sam Carpenter in Scream VI (2023)
- First appearance: Scream (2022)
- Last appearance: Scream VI (2023)
- Created by: James Vanderbilt; Guy Busick
- Portrayed by: Melissa Barrera
- Last mentioned: Scream 7 (2026) (Note: Sam is mentioned by Mindy Meeks-Martin indirectly as Billy Loomis' love child in Scream 7.)
- Birth date: May 19, 1997 (Note: Sam is the daughter of Billy Loomis and was born after his death, meaning she would have been born in 1997.)

In-universe information
- Full name: Samantha Carpenter
- Nicknames: Sam; New Girl (by Gale); Rookie (by Gale)
- Occupation: Babysitter; Bowling alley employee Ghostface (briefly)
- Family: Billy Loomis (father); Christina Carpenter (mother); Mr. Carpenter (legal father); Tara Carpenter (half-sister)
- Significant others: Danny Brackett (boyfriend)
- Relatives: Paternal: Nancy Loomis (grandmother); Hank Loomis (grandfather)
- Nationality: American
- Location: Carpenter Residence, Woodsboro, California (formerly); Modesto, California (formerly); New York City, NY
- Status: Alive

Samantha "Sam" Carpenter is a fictional character and antihero from the Scream franchise. The character was created by James Vanderbilt and Guy Busick and portrayed by Mexican actress Melissa Barrera. She first appeared in Scream (2022) as the protagonist and returned for Scream VI (2023). Introduced as the half-sister of the fifth film's cold open survivor, Samantha is later revealed to be the secret daughter of Billy Loomis, the villain of the first Scream film.

The character is depicted as a protective, resilient young woman who gradually becomes more brutal over the course of the series as she attempts to overcome her lineage and the threats around her.

== Appearances ==
Samantha Carpenter first appeared in Scream (2022) and was retconned to have been born sometime after Scream (1996) and had been present, in which she made her unseen presence in Scream 4 (2011) as a student at Woodsboro High, though she did not appear on screen. She is mentioned indirectly by Mindy Meeks-Martin in Scream 7 as Billy Loomis' ''love child''.

=== Films ===
Sam first appears outside the bowling alley she works at with her boyfriend Richie Kirsch. She gets a call from Wes Hicks, who tells her her half-sister Tara has been attacked by a new Ghostface in Woodsboro. Sam and Richie travel from Modesto, to meet Tara at the hospital. Sam reveals a dark secret to Tara: Sam is the daughter of Billy Loomis, the original Ghostface. She discovered this years earlier and is why she left Tara and home. Tara is angered with her sister. Meanwhile, the new Ghostface continues killing and even attacks Sam. She teams up with Dewey Riley to stop them.

At the hospital, Ghostface kills a guard and attacks Tara. Sam and Dewey show up to help and escape with Tara and Richie, but Dewey stays behind to fight and dies at the hands of Ghostface. The next day, they meet Gale and Sidney. The trio leave that evening, but have to return when Tara leaves her inhaler. They travel to her best friend Amber's, who is having a party. Ghostface reveals themselves as Amber and attacks the group, as Sam realizes she is at Stu Macher's house. Amber is known to have an accomplice. Sidney and Gale show up and Sidney fights Ghostface over a railing, where they are knocked windless. They both crawl towards the gun but Sam reaches it first. Richie makes it to Sam and suddenly stabs her, revealing himself as the accomplice. Ghostface unmasks as Amber and the two of them take everyone to the kitchen to recreate the original events. Richie is a Stab (an in-universe movie about the events) and dated Sam to get close to her, after Amber discovered she was Billy's daughter. They plan to frame her, so they can make a new movie. Sam manages to fight Richie, while Gale and Sidney take on Amber. They shoot and burn Amber, presumably killing her. Sam then gets the upper hand on Richie and her father Billy (whom she has hallucinated throughout the film) guides her to murder him through a hallucination. She brutally murders him. As she, Gale and Sidney embrace, Amber attacks them, but Tara shoots her dead.

A year later in Scream VI, all four of the younger survivors have moved to New York for college. Sam and Tara are roommates with Quinn Bailey, the daughter of a cop, whose brother was killed. Sam is in therapy for what happened. A new Ghostface shows up and begins targeting them. In the ending, Ghostface is revealed as Quinn's father Wayne, Quinn and fellow student Ethan Landry. The truth is, they are all Kirschs, Richie's father and two siblings. They blame Sam for his death and want to frame her for those murders and the current ones. Sam kills Quinn, while Tara stabs Ethan. Alone with Wayne, Sam suits up in Billy's costume and calls him as Ghostface. She then brutally murders him. Tara stops her and they embrace. Ethan tries to kill them again, but Kirby Reed kills him. As the daylight comes, Sam and Tara leave the crime scene and Sam leaves behind Billy's mask.

== Character overview ==
=== Personality ===
The character is depicted as a deeply protective and resilient young woman who possesses a "ferocious" survival instinct. Unlike traditional final girls, Sam is characterized by her internal conflict regarding her lineage as the biological daughter of Billy Loomis. This "dark passenger" element makes her a more morally complex protagonist, as she often utilizes her inherited violent tendencies to protect her sister, Tara Carpenter.

Throughout the series, Sam evolves from a guilt-ridden runaway to a "ruthless" and "efficient" fighter. The Hollywood Reporter noted that her character arc is defined by a "grounded vulnerability" that gradually gives way to a "vicious" protective streak. Her personality is defined by her hyper-vigilance and her willingness to "go further" than past survivors to ensure the safety of her family, eventually embracing her heritage as a means of survival. Some also perceived her as a less empathetic protagonist, pointing to her colder character because of her mental state, compared to the more sensual Sidney Prescott, while others liked her coolness and brash dynamics.

=== Writing ===
Born in 1997, Sam is revealed in Scream (2022) to be the illegitimate daughter of Billy Loomis (Skeet Ulrich), the original Woodsboro killer, following an affair with her mother, Christina Carpenter. This revelation serves as the catalyst for the "requel" trilogy's plot, mirroring Sidney's own discovery of her mother's secret past in the original trilogy. Co-screenwriter James Vanderbilt stated that Sam was designed to be a "reflection of the franchise's history," struggling with a darkness that Sidney Prescott never had to face.

The fifth film establishes Sam's backstory through her estrangement from her family and her half-sister, Tara Carpenter (Jenna Ortega). The scripts for Scream (2022) and Scream VI (2023) utilize Sam's hallucinations of her father, Billy Loomis, as a narrative device to explore her internal struggle between her heroic instincts and her violent heritage. Directing duo Radio Silence noted that these visions were intended to differentiate her from Sidney by making her a more "morally complex" protagonist.

In Scream VI, the writing shifts Sam's character arc toward the "Core Four" dynamic, a term used in the script to describe the bond between Sam, Tara, and the Meeks-Martin twins. The film explores Sam's protective nature, which screenwriters Guy Busick and Vanderbilt described as "aggressive survivalism." The climax of the sixth film, set in a "Ghostface Shrine," provides visual confirmation of her status as the new series anchor when she dons her father's original mask to defeat the killers, a move the directors described as Sam "reclaiming her legacy" rather than being a victim of it.

Following Melissa Barrera's departure from the franchise in 2023, the planned conclusion to Sam's arc in Scream 7 (2026) was reportedly scrapped. Original drafts for the seventh film were intended to further explore the relationship between Sam and her mother, Christina, who remained an unseen character throughout Sam's two-film tenure as the lead. According to Ulrich, Sam was intended to be become Ghostface in a third film, planned as part of a trilogy. These claims have not been confirmed by any other sources involved in the film.

=== Casting ===
Melissa Barrera was one of the first actors cast for the 2022 relaunch of the franchise. Directors Matt Bettinelli-Olpin and Tyler Gillett (collectively known as Radio Silence) offered her the role of Sam Carpenter without a formal audition after seeing her performance in the Starz series Vida. According to an interview with The Hollywood Reporter, the directors felt Barrera possessed a "grounded vulnerability" necessary for a protagonist with a dark lineage.

The character was developed as a "retconned" addition to the Woodsboro legacy. While she first appeared on-screen in 2022, the script for Scream VI established her as a Woodsboro High School freshman during the events of Scream 4 (2011). In a scene with Kirby Reed (played by Hayden Panettiere), Sam confirms their shared history: "We went to the same high school. She was a senior when I was a freshman". This dialogue, paired with her established birth date of May 19, 1997, confirms her "unseen" presence in the town during the 2011 massacre.

In November 2023, it was widely reported by Variety that Spyglass Media Group had dismissed Barrera from the upcoming Scream 7. The studio cited her social media posts regarding the Israeli–Palestinian conflict as the reason for the termination. This decision led to a significant shift in the franchise's direction, including the subsequent departure of co-star Jenna Ortega.

== Reception ==
Some viewers and reviewers criticized Barrera's acting in the fifth film, but praised her in the sixth, noting the more elaborate script and the development of Sam as a character. Following her debut, the character of Sam Carpenter was credited with "modernizing" the franchise's Final Girl trope by introducing a protagonist with a "villainous" lineage. Her relationship with her sister, Tara Carpenter, became the central emotional pillar of the "Core Four," a term coined by fans and later adopted by the films' marketing. In November 2023, Spyglass Media Group dismissed Melissa Barrera from the upcoming Scream 7 due to her social media posts regarding the Gaza war.

The studio's decision sparked significant industry debate and led to a major restructuring of the franchise's future. According to The Hollywood Reporter, Barrera's exit prompted the subsequent departure of co-star Jenna Ortega and director Christopher Landon, resulting in the return of original lead Neve Campbell. Despite her abrupt exit, the character of Sam is cited by Rolling Stone as a "game-changing" figure in 21st-century horror for her complex moral ambiguity and "visceral" combat style.

== See also ==
- Sidney Prescott
- Final girl
- Laurie Strode
