= Tara Carpenter =

Fictional character in the Scream franchise

- Scream character
- Jenna Ortega as Tara Carpenter in Scream VI
- First appearance: Scream (2022)
- Last appearance: Scream VI (2023)
- Created by: James Vanderbilt; Guy Busick
- Portrayed by: Jenna Ortega

In-universe information
- Full name: Tara Carpenter
- Occupation: Student
- Family: Christina Carpenter (mother); Mr. Carpenter (father); Sam Carpenter (half-sister) Chad (Boyfriend)
- Nationality: American
- Location: Carpenter Residence, Woodsboro, California (formerly); New York City, NY
- Status: Alive

Tara Carpenter is a fictional character in the Scream franchise. She first appears in Scream (2022) and returns in Scream VI (2023). Tara is introduced as the target of the film's cold open attack but survives unlike the respective cold opens in most Scream sequels. She is the half-sister of Sam Carpenter and is used as live bait to draw Sam back, during which their family connection is revealed. She was created by James Vanderbilt and Guy Busick and is portrayed by Jenna Ortega.

== Appearances ==
In Scream (2022), Tara Carpenter is first seen at home in Woodsboro when she receives a phone call from Ghostface. The caller quizzes her on horror films before attacking her. Tara survives the assault despite multiple stab wounds and is hospitalised, prompting her estranged half-sister Sam Carpenter to return to town with her boyfriend Richie Kirsch. As the killings continue, Tara becomes a target again while recovering in the hospital. Ghostface murders a guard and attacks her, but Sam and Dewey Riley intervene. Dewey stays behind to confront the killer and is killed. Later, Tara attends a party at the former home of Stu Macher, where Ghostface reveals themself as Amber Freeman, with Richie as her accomplice. The pair attempt to frame Sam for the murders. During the final struggle, Tara overpowers Amber and shoots her, helping end the killing spree.

In Scream VI (2023), Tara moves to New York City to attend college alongside Chad and Mindy Meeks-Martin. Sam follows to stay close to her. Tara attempts to live a normal life and distance herself from the trauma of Woodsboro, though tensions arise between her and Sam over Sam's protective behaviour. The group finds an abandoned theater that has been set up as a shrine with memorabilia from previous Ghostface killings. The killers are revealed to be Wayne Bailey and his children, who want revenge for Richie's death. In the final battle, Tara stabs Ethan Landry to stop him, and she and Sam survive the attacks and leave the scene together.

== Character overview ==
The character is portrayed as independent and determined, particularly in Scream VI (2023), where she attempts to distance herself from the trauma of the Woodsboro attacks and pursue a normal college life.

In Scream (2022), she survives the film's opening attack and resists her assailant, drawing on her knowledge of horror film conventions during the confrontation. The film establishes her as a fan of The Babadook (2014), a detail introduced in the opening sequence and later referenced as a recurring joke following her encounter with Ghostface. Throughout Scream VI, Tara expresses frustration with her sister Sam's overprotective behaviour and seeks greater autonomy in her decisions.

In interviews promoting Scream VI, Jenna Ortega discussed her own interest in horror cinema, citing the slasher Prom Night (1980) and recommending films associated with Italian director Dario Argento.

=== Casting ===
Ortega was cast as Tara Carpenter for Scream (2022), the relaunch of the franchise. She reprised the role in Scream VI. In November 2023, it was reported that Ortega would not return for Scream 7 (2026) due to scheduling conflicts with her Netflix show Wednesday (2022-present), where she portrays the titular character.

== Reception ==
Writing for Dread Central, Mike Snoonian said that Tara in Scream VI shows a modern take on a survivor coping with trauma. Andrew Dominguez and Zoe Dumas of MovieWeb called Tara a standout character in Scream (2022) and praised Ortega's performance. Gaby Shedwick of Collider noted that Tara surviving the cold open helped refresh the franchise's usual formula.

Ortega won Most Frightened Performance at the MTV Movie & TV Awards for Scream (2022), which was also nominated for Best Movie.
