= Scream (2022 film) =

American slasher film

- Theatrical release poster
- Directed by: Matt Bettinelli-Olpin; Tyler Gillett
- Written by: James Vanderbilt; Guy Busick
- Based on: Characters by Kevin Williamson
- Produced by: William Sherak; James Vanderbilt; Paul Neinstein
- Starring: Melissa Barrera; Mason Gooding; Jenna Ortega; Jack Quaid; Marley Shelton; Courteney Cox; David Arquette; Neve Campbell
- Cinematography: Brett Jutkiewicz
- Edited by: Michel Aller
- Music by: Brian Tyler
- Production companies: Spyglass Media Group; Project X Entertainment; Radio Silence Productions
- Distributed by: Paramount Pictures
- Release date: January 14, 2022
- Running time: 114 minutes
- Country: United States
- Language: English
- Budget: $24 million
- Box office: $138 million

Scream is a 2022 American slasher film directed by Matt Bettinelli-Olpin and Tyler Gillett, and written by James Vanderbilt and Guy Busick. It is a sequel to Scream 4 (2011), the fifth installment in the Scream film series, and the first in the series not directed by Wes Craven, who died in 2015 and to whom the film is dedicated. It is also the first film in the franchise not to be produced by Dimension Films after it was shut down in 2018, and the first film to be distributed by Paramount Pictures, who took over the franchise rights after their stake in Miramax. The film stars Melissa Barrera, Mason Gooding, Jenna Ortega, and Jack Quaid, with Marley Shelton, Courteney Cox, David Arquette, and Neve Campbell reprising their roles from previous installments. The plot takes place twenty-five years after the original Woodsboro murders from Scream (1996), when yet another Ghostface appears and begins targeting a group of teenagers who are each somehow linked to the original killings.

Although fifth and sixth Scream installments were discussed after the release of Scream 4 in 2011, Craven, writer Kevin Williamson, and executive producer Harvey Weinstein had doubts about proceeding with more films following the less-than-expected box office performance of the fourth film. After the 2017 sexual assault allegations against Weinstein and the closure of the Weinstein Company, the rights to the Scream franchise were obtained by Spyglass Media Group in November 2019, who confirmed a new film would later be made. The following year, Williamson, who was returning as an executive producer, confirmed the film would not be a reboot and that Bettinelli-Olpin and Gillett had been hired in March 2020 to direct the film. Campbell and Arquette were confirmed to be returning later that month, with Cox and the new cast members joining throughout the middle of the year. Filming took place between September and November 2020 in North Carolina. To avoid any plot leaks, numerous versions of the screenplay were produced, and several additional scenes were filmed. Brian Tyler, a frequent collaborator of Bettinelli-Olpin and Gillett, was hired to compose and conduct the film's score, replacing Marco Beltrami, the composer of the previous four films.

Scream was released in the United States on January 14, 2022, by Paramount Pictures. The film received generally positive reviews from critics, who praised the direction, performances and tribute to Craven, with some calling it the best Scream sequel. It was also a box-office success, grossing $138 million against a production budget of $24 million. A sequel, Scream VI, was released in March 2023.

== Plot ==
Twenty-five years after Billy Loomis and Stu Macher's killing spree in Woodsboro, (Note: As depicted in Scream (1996)) high school student Tara Carpenter is home alone when she is attacked by Ghostface and left hospitalized.

In Modesto, Tara's estranged older half-sister Sam Carpenter is informed about the attack. She returns to Woodsboro with her boyfriend Richie Kirsch to visit Tara at the hospital. There, Sam is reunited with Tara's friend group: Wes Hicks, Liv McKenzie, Amber Freeman, and twins Chad and Mindy Meeks-Martin. That night, Vince Schneider—Stu's nephew and Liv's ex-boyfriend—is killed by Ghostface. After an encounter with Ghostface at the hospital, Sam reveals to Tara that she has been dealing with hallucinations of Billy, who had an affair with their mother in high school and whom she discovered as a teenager was her biological father. Sam's discovery of her true parentage led to their parents' divorce and is the primary reason for her estrangement from Tara.

Sam and Richie seek help from Dewey Riley, who is now divorced from Gale Weathers. Dewey contacts Gale and Sidney Prescott to warn them about the return of Ghostface. He joins Sam and Richie at the Meeks twins' home, where he briefly reunites with their mother, Martha Meeks, Randy Meeks' sister. Mindy deduces that the killer is creating a "requel", targeting Tara and her friends as the new generation while using Sam's connection to Billy to lure the legacy survivors. Ghostface murders Wes and his mother, Sheriff Judy Hicks, a survivor of the 2011 murders, (Note: As depicted in Scream 4 (2011)) at their home. Dewey reunites with Gale, who has returned to town to cover the story. At the hospital, Tara and Richie are attacked by Ghostface but are saved by Dewey and Sam. The Carpenter sisters and Richie escape, but Dewey is killed when he attempts to finish off Ghostface.

Sidney arrives in town after learning of Dewey's death and meets Gale and Sam at the hospital. Sidney asks Sam to help stop Ghostface, but Sam declines, choosing to leave town with Richie and Tara. Sidney and Gale follow the trio to Amber's house, revealed to be Stu's former home, where the original Woodsboro massacre took place. During a party in Wes' honor, the Meeks twins are attacked by Ghostface. As the friend group gathers, Amber pulls out Dewey's gun and shoots Liv dead, revealing herself as Ghostface. Sidney and Gale arrive, and Richie is revealed to be Amber's accomplice. He stabs Sam, and together, he and Amber take Sam, Sidney, and Gale into the kitchen where Sidney first confronted Billy and Stu.

Richie and Amber explain that they are fans of the Stab film series who met online. Disappointed with the direction of the most recent Stab 8, they initiated a new killing spree to inspire a fresh installment based on true events and planned to frame Sam as the culprit. Sam attacks Richie, while Tara attacks Amber but is incapacitated. Sidney and Gale fight Amber, ending with Gale shooting Amber, causing her to fall onto a lit stove and catch fire. Richie chases Sam, who sees a hallucination of Billy that guides her to Amber's abandoned knife. Embracing her paternal legacy, Sam repeatedly stabs Richie and slits his throat before shooting him to ensure he is dead. A horribly burned Amber attempts to attack the group again, but is fatally shot by Tara.

Tara and the Meeks twins are taken to the hospital, while Sam thanks Sidney and Gale for their help. Gale decides not to write a book about the new murders to avoid giving the killers notoriety, opting instead to write a tribute to Dewey. Sam joins Tara in the ambulance as the night's events are reported on the news.

== Cast ==
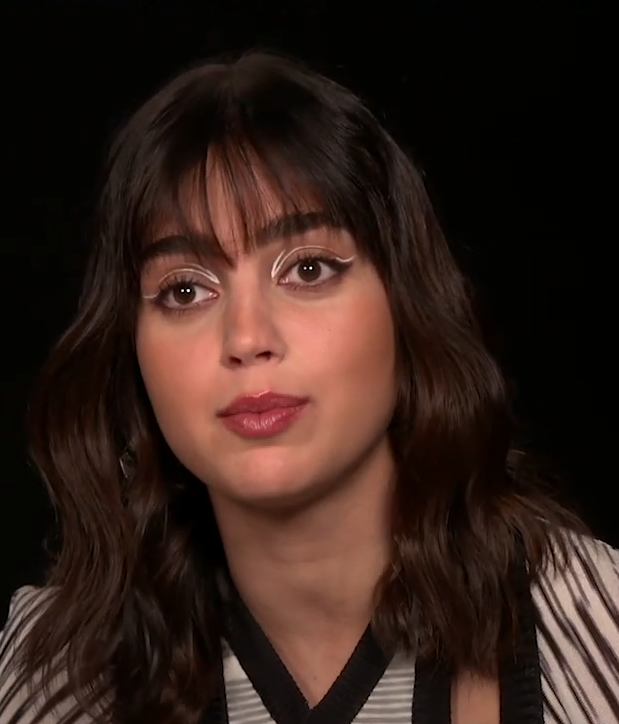
Melissa Barrera was introduced as Sam Carpenter, daughter of Billy Loomis, one of the original killers of Scream (1996).

- Neve Campbell as Sidney Prescott, Ghostface's main target and a survivor of several Ghostface murder sprees who is now married and lives outside of Woodsboro
- Courteney Cox as Gale Weathers, a talk show host, Dewey's ex-wife, and survivor of several Ghostface murder sprees
- David Arquette as Dewey Riley, a former sheriff, Gale's ex-husband and survivor of several Ghostface murder sprees
- Melissa Barrera as Sam Carpenter, Tara's older half-sister, Billy Loomis's daughter and Ghostface's new main target
- Jenna Ortega as Tara Carpenter, Sam's young half-sister who is attacked by Ghostface
- Jack Quaid as Richie Kirsch, Sam's boyfriend
- Mikey Madison as Amber Freeman, Tara's friend
- Dylan Minnette as Wes Hicks, Judy's son
- Jasmin Savoy Brown as Mindy Meeks-Martin, Tara's friend, a film guru, Chad's twin sister and Randy Meeks' niece
- Mason Gooding as Chad Meeks-Martin, Tara's friend, Mindy's twin brother and Randy Meeks' nephew
- Sonia Ammar as Liv McKenzie, Chad's girlfriend
- Marley Shelton as Judy Hicks, sheriff at Woodsboro, survivor of the Ghostface killings in 2011 and Wes's mother
- Skeet Ulrich as Billy Loomis, one of the original Ghostface killers and Sam's father who appears in her visions
- Kyle Gallner as Vince Schneider, Stu Macher's nephew
- Chester Tam as Vinson
- Reggie Conquest as Farney, a Woodsboro police officer
- Heather Matarazzo as Martha Meeks, Randy's younger sister and mother of Chad and Mindy
- Roger L. Jackson as the voice of Ghostface

Previous Scream actors Matthew Lillard (Stu Macher), Drew Barrymore (Casey Becker), Jamie Kennedy (Randy Meeks), Hayden Panettiere (Kirby Reed), Henry Winkler (Arthur Himbry), and Adam Brody (Ross Hoss) provide voiceovers for partygoers who participate in a toast for Wes, which doubles as a tribute for Wes Craven. Additional voice overs in the toast are provided by directors Matt Bettinelli-Olpin and Tyler Gillett, Craven's widow Iya Labunka, previous Scream screenwriter Kevin Williamson, previous composer Marco Beltrami, previous editor Patrick Lussier, previous co-producer Julie Plec, and filmmaker Rian Johnson. Lillard also voices Ghostface in Stab 8 and Barrymore voices a school principal. Jamie Kennedy provided the production with unreleased photographs of his younger self to be used by his Scream (1996), Scream 2 (1997) and Scream 3 (2000) character Randy Meeks for a shrine in Martha, Chad and Mindy's living room, while an image of Panettiere as her Scream 4 (2011) character Kirby Reed is briefly shown, retroactively revealing the character to have survived the events of the film. Footage of Scream 3 star Scott Foley and Scream 2 star Joshua Jackson is briefly shown in a Stab film within a film, using footage of the duo taken from the Dawson's Creek episode "The Scare".

James A. Janisse and Chelsea Rebecca of the YouTube channel Dead Meat appear as the hosts of the fictional YouTube channel Film Fails. Christopher Speed portrays Randy Meeks in the film within a film Stab.

== Production ==
=== Development ===
In 2011, Wes Craven confirmed he was contracted to work on a fifth and sixth installment of the Scream franchise, to be made if the fourth film achieved a successful release and reception. Following difficulties with script rewrites on Scream 2, Scream 3, and Scream 4, often with pages only being ready on the day of filming, and the related stress of the situation, Craven stated that he would need to see a finalized version of a script for Scream 5 before committing to the production. Kevin Williamson also confirmed he had contractual obligations for scripts for Scream 4 and Scream 5, having submitted concepts for three films leading up to Scream 6, though his contract for the sixth film had not yet been finalized. Williamson indicated that if a Scream 5 were to be made, it would be a continuation of the story of the characters who lived through Scream 4 but that Scream 4 would not include any cliffhangers that led into the potential sequel.

Before the release of Scream 4, actor David Arquette also supported a potential future of the franchise, stating "[the ending] definitely leaves it open," before adding that he would welcome the opportunity to play the character of Dewey in future installments. In May 2011, executive producer Harvey Weinstein confirmed that a sequel was possible, saying that despite Scream 4 performing below the Weinstein Company's financial expectations, he was still happy with its box office gross. In February 2012, when asked about the potential for making Scream 5, Williamson stated at the time that he did not know if it would be made, saying "I'm not doing it."

On September 30, 2013, Harvey Weinstein expressed his interest in a fifth installment, stating, "I'm begging [Bob Weinstein] to do the movie and just end it. We've milked that cow." In July 2014, Williamson expressed doubt on a fifth film happening, saying, "I guess Scream 4 never took off in a way they hoped". He also elaborated on his departure from the series as Craven and his team were "done with him". Williamson later detailed his plans where a proposed Scream 5 would follow Jill being stalked on a college campus, while Scream 6 would feature Gale in the lead and focus on her relationship with Dewey. On June 25, 2015, The Wall Street Journal conducted an interview with Bob Weinstein. When asked about the possibility of a film continuation after Scream 4, Weinstein firmly denied the possibility of a fifth installment or any further continuation of the film franchise, citing the MTV television series as the right place for the franchise to find new life. "It's like putting an art-house movie in an art-house theater," Weinstein said. "Where the teens reside is MTV."

Following the closure of the Weinstein Company in the wake of numerous sexual misconduct allegations against Harvey Weinstein, the fate of the Scream franchise was in limbo. In early 2019, reports began to circulate that Blumhouse Productions, which specializes in horror-themed films, was interested in reviving the series, and that studio head Jason Blum was working on making such Scream installments happen. These reports were confirmed to be false. In November 2019, Spyglass Media Group acquired the rights to make a new Scream film. It was unknown at the time if it would be a sequel, reboot, or remake. It was also unknown if Williamson would return. The next month, it was announced that the film would feature a new cast but could possibly feature appearances from previous main cast members. On November 18, 2020, Kevin Williamson revealed that the film's official title is Scream. The title Scream Forever was first considered and used on the initial draft of the script.

=== Directors and casting ===
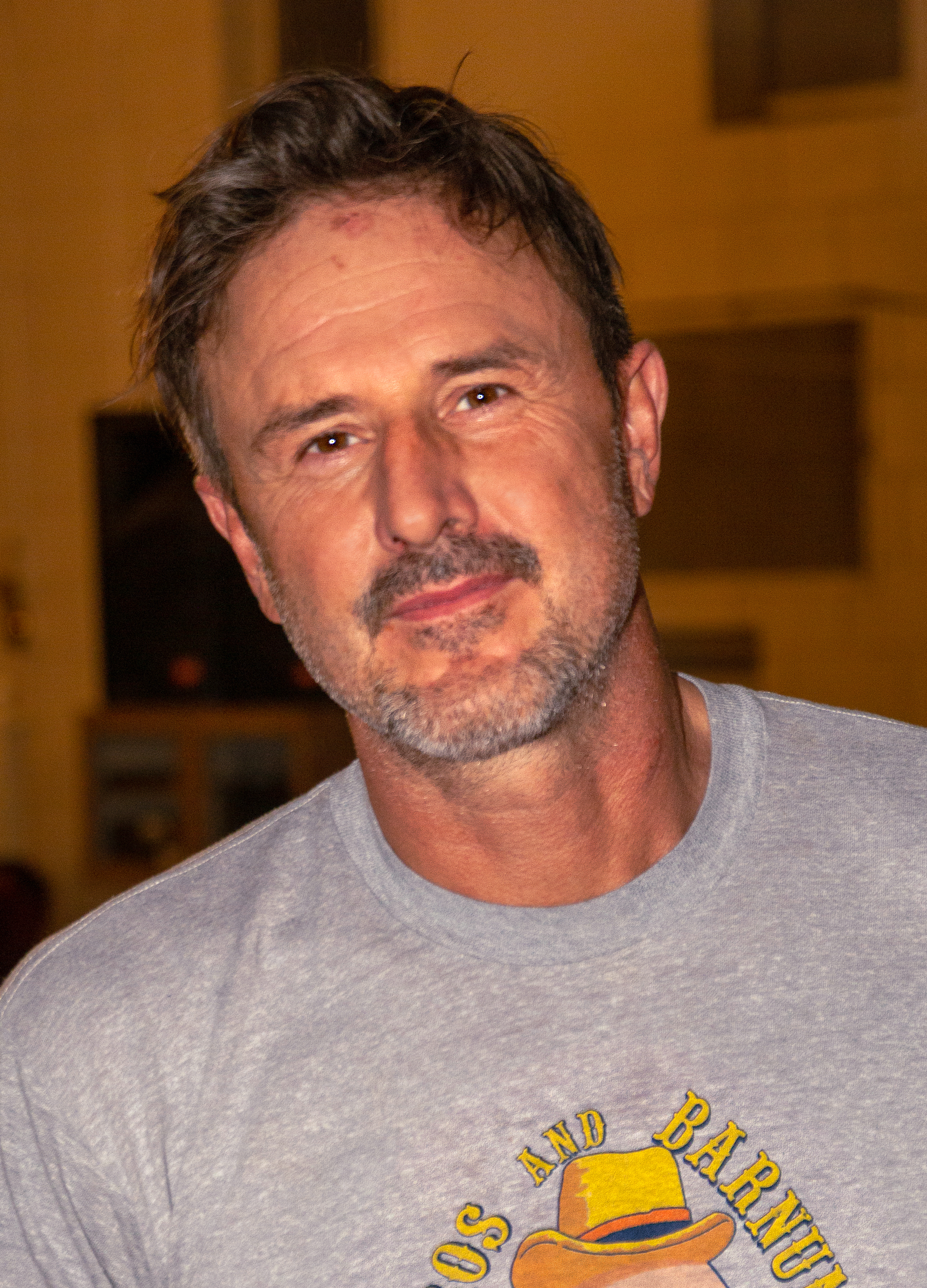
David Arquette was the first "legacy actor" who was set to star in the film, once again reprising his long-running role of Dewey Riley.

In March 2020, it was announced that Radio Silence's Matt Bettinelli-Olpin and Tyler Gillett would direct the fifth installment, with Kevin Williamson serving as an executive producer, and that the film had already entered official development, with filming planned to begin in May 2020. The filmmakers were in the midst of developing Cocaine Bear when the producers approached them to direct the film. In May 2020, it was announced that Neve Campbell was in talks to reprise her role as Sidney Prescott in the film. That same month, it was announced David Arquette would be reprising his role of Dewey Riley; James Vanderbilt and Guy Busick were announced as screenwriters. It was also confirmed that the film would begin production later in the year in Wilmington, North Carolina, when safety protocols to deal with the COVID-19 pandemic were in place. When writer/producer James Vanderbilt first presented the script to Williamson and asked him to be a part of the film, he turned the offer down, claiming he didn't want to be involved in a Scream project without Wes Craven. Williamson eventually contacted Vanderbilt later on, agreeing to join the film under the condition that the film be dedicated to Craven.

In June 2020, Variety reported that the film was set to be distributed by Paramount Pictures and was initially aiming for a 2021 release, which would be 25 years since the first film was released in 1996. Variety also noted that it was still not known if Courteney Cox or Campbell, or any other legacy actors other than Arquette, would reprise their roles. On July 31, 2020, Cox posted a video to her official Instagram account, confirming her return to the franchise for the fifth installment. The news was then confirmed by various other outlets.

In August 2020, Paramount Pictures announced that the film was scheduled to be released on January 14, 2022, having been delayed from its original 2021 tentative release due to the COVID-19 pandemic. In August 2020, Melissa Barrera and Jenna Ortega were cast in undisclosed roles. In an interview with Nightmare on Film Street on September 11, 2020, Ortega was confirmed as playing a lead role by The Babysitter: Killer Queen director McG. Also in September 2020, Jack Quaid joined the cast in an undisclosed role. In the same month, it was confirmed that Neve Campbell, Marley Shelton, and Roger L. Jackson would return to reprise their roles, with Dylan Minnette, Mason Gooding, Kyle Gallner, Jasmin Savoy Brown, Mikey Madison, and Sonia Ben Ammar joining the cast. Gallner auditioned for the part of Richie but was not cast in that role; he was subsequently offered the role of Vince. Skeet Ulrich reprised his role as Billy Loomis for the first time since Scream (1996). Ulrich shot his scenes in one day with Barrera in front of a green screen. Rian Johnson was meant to make a cameo appearance as himself, but his commitments to Glass Onion: A Knives Out Mystery prevented him from doing so. Instead, Johnson is mentioned in passing as the director of the fictional film Stab 8.

=== Filming ===
Principal photography was originally scheduled to begin in Wilmington, North Carolina, in May 2020, but was delayed due to the COVID-19 pandemic. Filming instead began on September 23, 2020, under the working title Parkside. Filming took place across several avenues in Wilmington, including exterior shots of Williston Middle School and interior shots of Cardinal Lanes Shipyard and 10th Street (between Ann and Castle streets). The film was awarded $7 million in rebates by the North Carolina Film Office. In the midst of production, the studio got cold feet on killing off the character of Dewey and requested that the directors film an alternate scene showing his survival. Bettinelli-Olpin and Gillett shot a brief scene with Campbell and Cox, with "no intention of ever fucking using it". Filming was completed on November 17, 2020. The existence of not only multiple versions of the film's screenplay but also multiple filmed scenes, to avoid details of the actual storyline being leaked before the film's release, was confirmed in April 2021. During the post-production stage, Michel Aller served as the primary editor for the film. Editor Patrick Lussier had provided feedback on an early cut of the film. Post-production on the film was completed by July 7, 2021.

=== Music ===
On May 12, 2021, it was confirmed that Brian Tyler would score the soundtrack for the film. Tyler had previously worked with Matt Bettinelli-Olpin and Tyler Gillett on Ready or Not, and would be replacing Marco Beltrami, who composed the score for the previous four films. The soundtrack album was released on January 7, 2022, by Varèse Sarabande.

== Release ==
=== Theatrical ===
Scream was released on January 14, 2022, by Paramount Pictures. The film's red carpet premiere was scheduled for January 11, 2022, but was canceled due to the extended COVID-19 pandemic and rise of the Omicron variant.

=== Home media ===
In the United States, Scream was released digitally on March 1, 2022. It was released on Ultra HD Blu-ray, Blu-ray and DVD on April 5, 2022, by Paramount Home Entertainment. The film grossed $5.1 million in home sales.

Scream and its sequel, Scream VI (2023), became available in a two-movie digital collection on April 25, 2023. A six-disc DVD box set collection including the first six movies of the Scream franchise became available at Amazon, Walmart, and Best Buy in 2023.

== Reception ==
=== Box office ===
Scream grossed $82 million in the United States and Canada, and $56 million in other territories, for a worldwide total of $138 million. Deadline Hollywood estimated the net profit of the film to be $56.7 million, when factoring together all expenses and revenues.

In the United States and Canada, Scream was projected to gross at least $20 million from 3,661 theaters over its four-day opening weekend, which included the Martin Luther King Jr. Day holiday. Some estimates were higher: Variety and Comscore both predicted a $25–30 million opening while Boxoffice Pro projected a $28–39 million four-day opening, factoring in positive word-of-mouth, young viewers being part of the target audience, theatrical exclusivity, ticket pre-sales and social media buzz, and the film serving as a revival to a well-known franchise. The film earned $13.3 million on its first day, including $3.5 million from Thursday night previews. It went on to debut to $30 million (and $33.8 million over the four days), becoming the first film to dethrone Spider-Man: No Way Home at the box office. Men made up 53% of the audience during its opening, with those in the age range of 18–34 comprising 67% of ticket sales and those above 25 comprising 58%. The ethnic breakdown of the audience showed that 46% were Caucasian, 33% Hispanic or Latino, 11% African American, and 5% Asian or other ethnicities. The film fell 58.7% in its sophomore weekend to $12.2 million, finishing second behind No Way Home. The film earned $7.2 million in its third weekend, $4.8 million in its fourth, $3 million in its fifth, and $2 million in its sixth, $1.3 million in its seventh, $575,787 in its eighth, and $469,394 in its ninth. The film dropped out of the box office top ten in its tenth weekend, finishing thirteenth with $237,315.

Outside the U.S. and Canada, the film earned $17.9 million in its opening weekend from 50 markets. The film made $10.2 million from 54 markets in its second weekend, $6.5 million from 55 markets in its third, and $4.3 million from 59 markets in its fourth.

=== Critical response ===
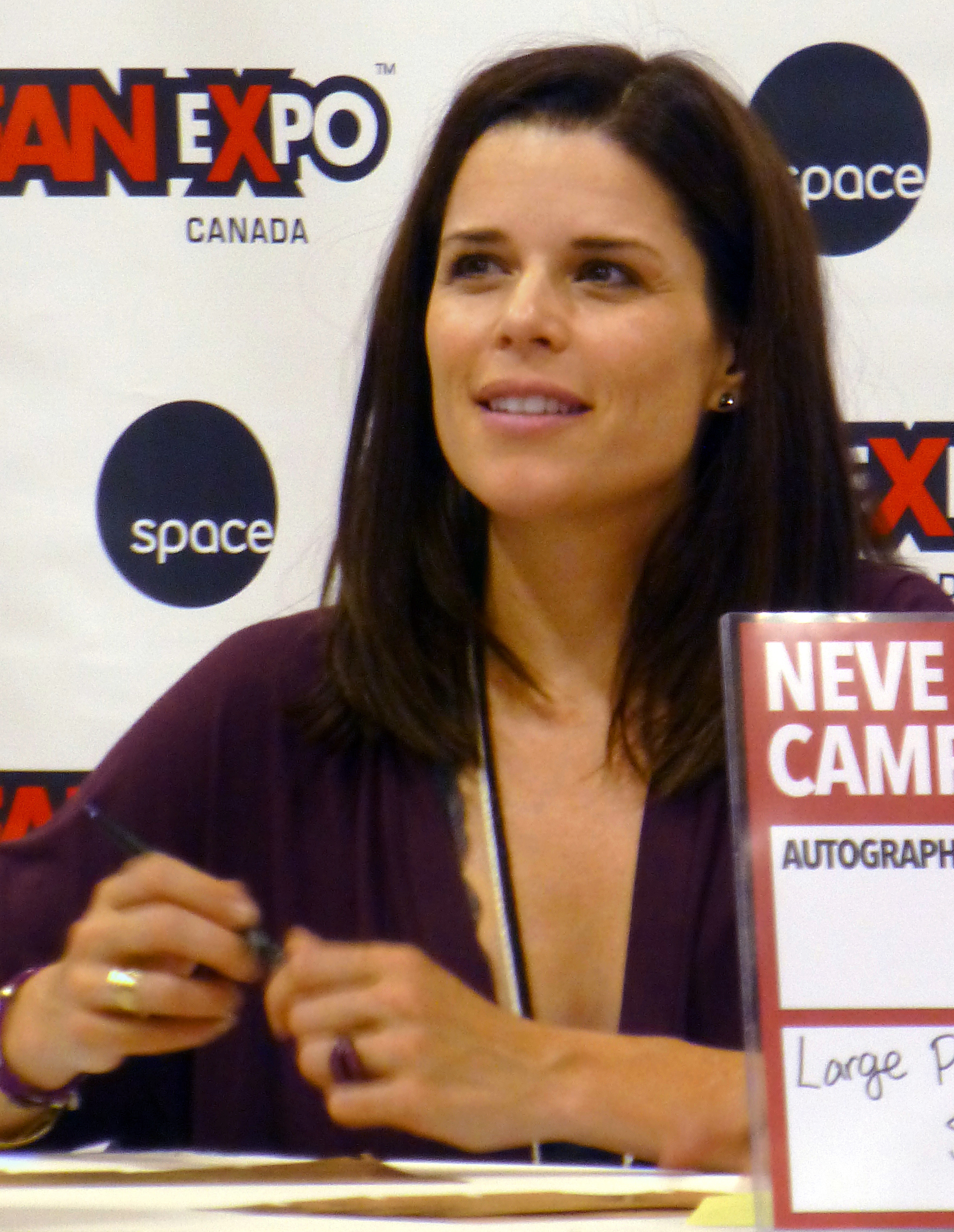
The performances of the cast, especially Neve Campbell's (pictured), were praised by critics.

On the review aggregator website Rotten Tomatoes, the film holds an approval rating of 76% based on 300 reviews, and an average rating of 6.6/10. The site's critical consensus reads, "The fifth Scream finds the franchise working harder than ever to maintain its meta edge – and succeeding surprisingly often." On Metacritic, the film has a weighted average score of 60 out of 100, based on 49 critics, indicating "mixed or average" reviews. Audiences polled by CinemaScore gave the film an average grade of B+ on an A+ to F scale, while those at PostTrak gave it an overall 79% positive score, with 61% saying they would definitely recommend it.

Aedan Juvet of Screen Rant called the entry an excellent modern slasher and wrote, "Though the franchise has always been a distinguished property with pure perfection, the recent return to Scream raises the bar for aspiring slashers, once again setting a standard for modern horror – just as it did 25 years ago." Michael Phillips of the Chicago Tribune wrote: "If we were to make a franchise-reboot comparison: Scream lands about halfway between the pretty-good 2018 Halloween and the turgid follow-up Halloween Kills." Peter Bradshaw of The Guardian gave the film 3 out of 5 stars, writing "But it's still capable of delivering some piercing high-pitched decibels." Wenlei Ma of News.com.au rated the film 3 out of 5 and felt that "Scream 5 lacks the spark Bettinelli-Olpin and Gillett brought to their previous endeavour. Scream 5 is certainly funny and irreverent, but where it falls over is that it's rarely scary." Writing for The New York Times, Jeannette Catsoulis gave the film a negative review, criticizing the fan service. She stated, "Wearyingly repetitive and entirely fright-free, Scream teaches us mainly that planting Easter eggs is no substitute for seeding ideas."

The performances of the cast were particularly praised. Campbell was acclaimed for her performance, and was noted for her "fresh" take on the role of Prescott. The Hollywood Reporter wrote that "it's a pleasure to see Campbell again in fine form as Sidney, striding back into Woodsboro to take care of unfinished business". Elle magazine named Campbell the "Reigning Queen of Scream" and stated that "Sidney might not have that impact on people were it not for Campbell's portrayal, rife with vulnerability, intelligence, and a palatable dose of humor."

On the July 22, 2022, episode of The Ringer's The Big Picture podcast, director Jordan Peele called out the movie when asked "What was the last great thing you've seen?", describing it as "clever" and "fun", and noting "the performances are great".

=== Accolades ===
Year	Award	Category	Nominee(s)	Result	Ref.
2022	Hollywood Critics Association Midseason Film Awards	Best Horror	Scream	Nominated	
2022	MTV Movie & TV Awards	Best Movie	Scream	Nominated	
2022	MTV Movie & TV Awards	Most Frightened Performance	Jenna Ortega	Won	
2022	People's Choice Awards	The Drama Movie of 2022	Scream	Nominated	
2022	The Queerties	Studio Movie	Scream	Nominated	
2022	Saturn Awards	Best Horror Film	Scream	Nominated	
2022	Saturn Awards	Best Writing	James Vanderbilt and Guy Busick	Nominated	
2023	Fangoria Chainsaw Awards	Best Supporting Performance	Jenna Ortega	Nominated	
2023	GLAAD Media Awards	Outstanding Film – Wide Theatrical Release	Scream	Nominated	

== Sequel ==
In January 2022, Neve Campbell and the film's directors expressed interest in making future films in the series. A sixth film was officially green-lit on February 3, 2022, with the same creative team returning. Courteney Cox confirmed her involvement that March.

In May 2022, it was announced that Melissa Barrera, Jasmin Savoy Brown, Mason Gooding, and Jenna Ortega would also return for the sixth film. The following day, it was also announced that Hayden Panettiere would reprise her role of Kirby Reed from the fourth film.

On June 6, Neve Campbell announced she would not be reprising her role as Sidney for the sixth film, saying "I felt the offer that was presented to me did not equate to the value I have brought to the franchise", but added, "To all my Scream fans, I love you. You've always been so incredibly supportive to me. I'm forever grateful to you and to what this franchise has given me over the past 25 years."

Scream VI was theatrically released in the United States in March 2023 by Paramount Pictures.
