= Scream VI =

2023 American slasher film

- Theatrical release poster
- Directed by: Matt Bettinelli-Olpin; Tyler Gillett
- Written by: James Vanderbilt; Guy Busick
- Based on: Characters by Kevin Williamson
- Produced by: William Sherak; James Vanderbilt; Paul Neinstein
- Starring: Melissa Barrera; Jasmin Savoy Brown; Jack Champion; Henry Czerny; Mason Gooding; Liana Liberato; Dermot Mulroney; Devyn Nekoda; Jenna Ortega; Tony Revolori; Josh Segarra; Samara Weaving; Hayden Panettiere; Courteney Cox
- Cinematography: Brett Jutkiewicz
- Edited by: Jay Prychidny
- Music by: Brian Tyler; Sven Faulconer
- Production companies: Spyglass Media Group; Project X Entertainment; Radio Silence Productions
- Distributed by: Paramount Pictures
- Release dates: March 6, 2023 (AMC Lincoln Square Theater); March 10, 2023 (United States)
- Running time: 122 minutes
- Country: United States
- Language: English
- Budget: $33–35 million
- Box office: $167 million

Scream VI is a 2023 American slasher film directed by Matt Bettinelli-Olpin and Tyler Gillett, and written by James Vanderbilt and Guy Busick. It is a sequel to Scream (2022) and the sixth installment in the Scream film series. The film stars Melissa Barrera, Jasmin Savoy Brown, Mason Gooding, Roger L. Jackson, Jenna Ortega, Skeet Ulrich, Hayden Panettiere, and Courteney Cox, all reprising their roles from previous installments, with Jack Champion, Henry Czerny, Liana Liberato, Dermot Mulroney, Devyn Nekoda, Tony Revolori, Josh Segarra, and Samara Weaving joining the ensemble cast. The plot follows a new Ghostface killer, who begins targeting the survivors of the Woodsboro murders in New York City.

A sixth Scream film was announced just weeks after the successful debut of Scream (2022). Much of the cast signed on to reprise their roles, with Bettinelli-Olpin, Gillett, Vanderbilt, and Busick also returning. Filming took place in Montreal, Canada, from June to late August 2022. Neve Campbell did not reprise her role as Sidney Prescott due to a pay dispute, making this the only Scream film not to feature her. Brian Tyler, who had scored the fifth film, returned to compose and conduct the score, with Sven Faulconer joining Tyler as a co-composer.

Scream VI premiered at the AMC Lincoln Square Theater in Manhattan on March 6, 2023, and was theatrically released in the United States on March 10 by Paramount Pictures. The film received generally positive reviews from critics, who praised the fresh setting for the franchise, the increased violence, and the performances of the cast. It grossed $167 million worldwide, becoming the first installment in the franchise to earn over $100 million at the domestic US box office since Scream 2 (1997). It won Best Movie at the 2023 MTV Movie & TV Awards and ranked #3 on The Hollywood Reporter's list of "The Best Slasher Movies of the Decade". A sequel, Scream 7, was released in February 2026.

== Plot ==
One year after the Woodsboro killings orchestrated by Richie Kirsch and Amber Freeman, (Note: As depicted in Scream (2022)) Blackmore University professor Laura Crane is catfished and murdered by her student Jason Carvey wearing a Ghostface costume. Jason plots with his roommate, Greg Bruckner, to kill sisters Sam and Tara Carpenter to finish the "movie" that Richie and Amber wanted to make. However, Jason receives a call from a different Ghostface, who has killed Greg and subsequently stabs Jason to death.

The Carpenter sisters now reside in New York City, with Tara attending Blackmore University alongside fellow survivors and twins Chad Meeks-Martin and Mindy Meeks-Martin; their roommate, Quinn Bailey; Mindy's girlfriend, Anika Kayoko; and Chad's roommate, Ethan Landry. Sam attends therapy with Dr. Christopher Stone, and has become a public pariah because of an online conspiracy theory that she was the true mastermind behind the recent killings. Quinn's father, Detective Wayne Bailey, calls Sam in for questioning as her ID was found at the scene of Jason's murder, along with a Ghostface mask worn by Richie and Amber. Ghostface calls Sam from Richie's number, then attacks Tara, kills multiple bystanders in a bodega, and leaves behind another Ghostface mask worn in the 2011 Woodsboro killings. (Note: As depicted in Scream 4 (2011))

At the NYPD police station, the Carpenter sisters meet with FBI special agent Kirby Reed, a survivor of the 2011 killings, and reporter Gale Weathers. Gale informs them that Sidney Prescott has gone into hiding to protect her family. Dr. Stone is murdered by Ghostface, who steals Sam's file and leaves behind a mask worn in the Hollywood killings. (Note: As depicted in Scream 3 (2000)) Mindy theorizes that the killer is following the rules of film franchises, specifically the rule that anyone can die while the franchise will still continue. From his window, Sam's boyfriend Danny witnesses Ghostface stabbing Quinn in the Carpenter sisters' apartment before attacking the group and killing Anika, leaving behind a mask worn in the Windsor College killings. (Note: As depicted in Scream 2 (1997)) Gale takes the group to an abandoned theater she found while investigating, which has been set up as a shrine to the Ghostface killers, featuring many items of evidence related to previous massacres now displayed like film props.

Ghostface calls Gale at her apartment and torments her about Dewey Riley's death before killing her boyfriend and attacking her. The Carpenter sisters arrive just in time to stop Ghostface from killing Gale, who is taken to the hospital. The group agrees to meet Kirby at the theater to trap Ghostface. Mindy and Ethan are separated from the group and while hopping onto another train, Mindy is stabbed by Ghostface on board. At the theater, Sam sees a hallucination of her biological father, Billy Loomis. Taking his knife from the original murders, (Note: As depicted in Scream (1996)) she realizes they have been locked inside. Two Ghostfaces appear and stab Chad. Wayne and Kirby both arrive with guns drawn and he shoots her, revealing himself as a third Ghostface and the mastermind. His accomplices are his children, revealed to be Ethan and a still-alive Quinn, who faked her death to shift suspicion. They reveal their motive is to take revenge on Sam for killing Richie, who was their brother and Wayne's first-born son. The trio were also responsible for the online smear campaign against Sam, having infiltrated her life with the intent of killing her. The Carpenter sisters ultimately gain the upper hand and fight them off, with Tara stabbing Ethan in the mouth and Sam killing Quinn with a shot to the head while briefly rendering Wayne unconscious. Sam then dons her father's Ghostface costume, taunts Wayne with a phone call, and stabs him to death. Ethan resurfaces, but Kirby kills him by smashing the television set that killed Stu Macher over his head.

Sam agrees to let Tara live her life more independently, and Tara agrees to go to therapy. As Kirby and the Meeks twins are taken to the hospital, Sam stares at her father's Ghostface mask before discarding it and following Tara and Danny into the city.

In a short post-credit scene, Mindy, during the scene where she was explaining the rules of a franchise from earlier in the film, informs her friends that "not every movie needs a post-credit scene".

== Cast ==
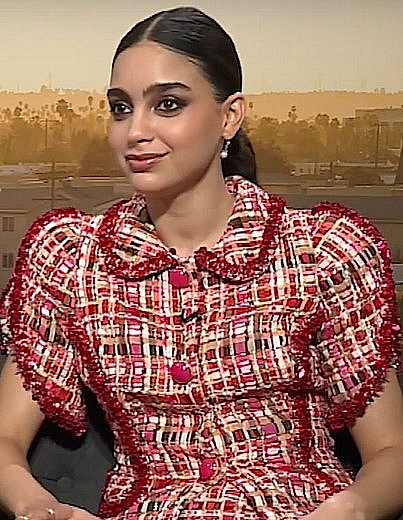
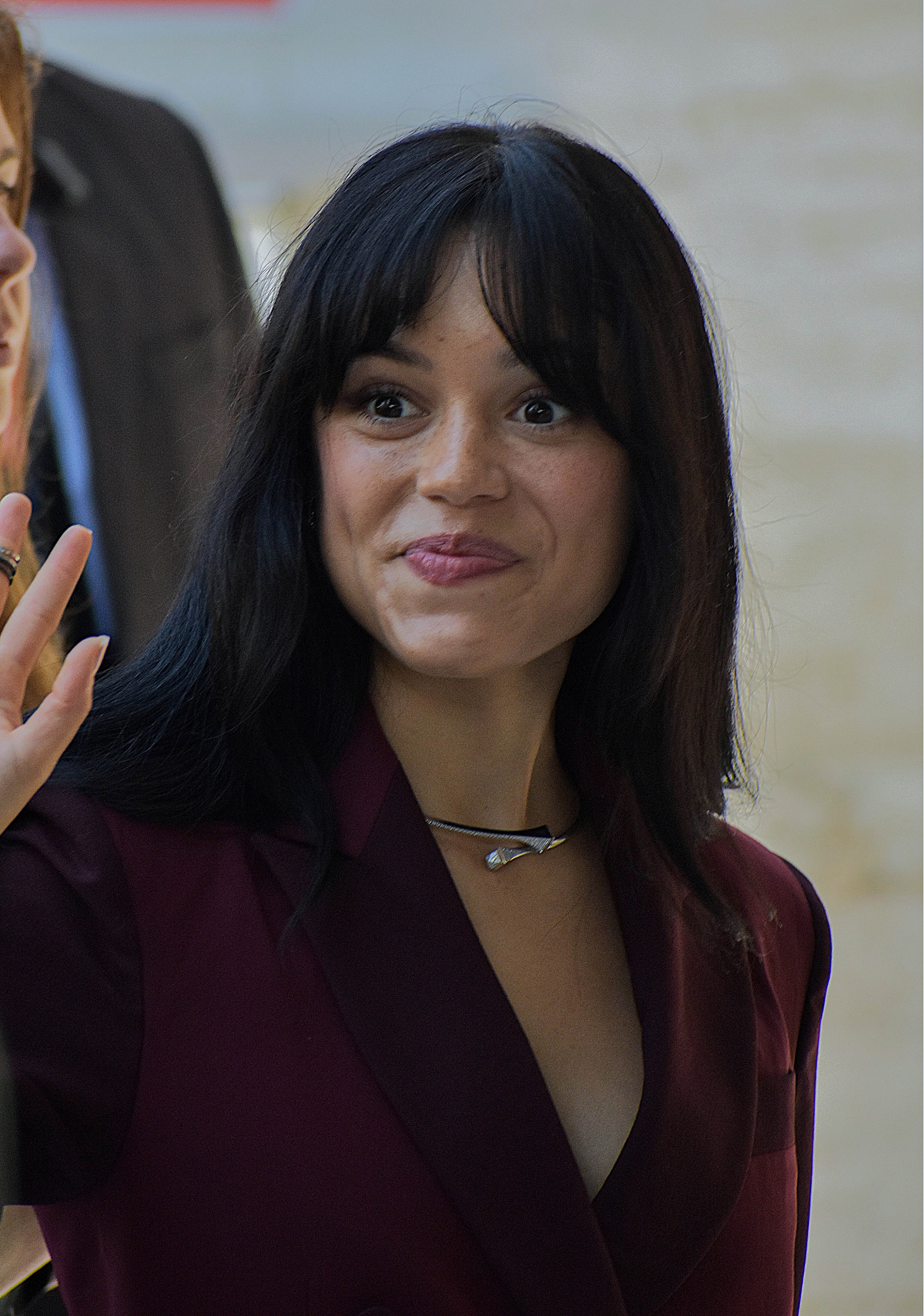
Melissa Barrera and Jenna Ortega play Sam and Tara Carpenter respectively.
- Melissa Barrera as Sam Carpenter, the daughter of Billy Loomis and survivor of the Woodsboro murders
- Jasmin Savoy Brown as Mindy Meeks-Martin, Chad's twin and a survivor of the Woodsboro murders who is often suspicious of Ethan
- Jack Champion as Ethan Landry, a student at Blackmore University and Chad's roommate
- Henry Czerny as Christopher Stone, Sam's therapist
- Mason Gooding as Chad Meeks-Martin, Mindy's twin, Tara's boyfriend, and a survivor of the Woodsboro killings
- Roger L. Jackson as the voice of Ghostface
- Liana Liberato as Quinn Bailey, a student at Blackmore University, Sam and Tara's roommate, and Wayne's daughter
- Dermot Mulroney as Wayne Bailey, a detective and Quinn's father
- Devyn Nekoda as Anika Kayoko, a student at Blackmore University and Mindy's girlfriend
- Jenna Ortega as Tara Carpenter, Sam's half-sister, Chad's girlfriend and survivor of the Woodsboro killings who longs for a normal life
- Tony Revolori as Jason Carvey, a film student at Blackmore University
- Josh Segarra as Danny Brackett, Sam, Tara and Quinn's neighbor, and Sam's secret boyfriend
- Skeet Ulrich as Billy Loomis, one of the original Ghostface killers and Sam's father who appears in her visions
- Samara Weaving as Laura Crane, a film professor at Blackmore University
- Hayden Panettiere as Kirby Reed, a survivor of the Woodsboro murders in 2011 who is now an FBI agent
- Courteney Cox as Gale Weathers, a talk show host, survivor of the previous murder sprees, and author, whose books form the basis of the biographically fictionalized Stab film series about the Ghostfaces.

Additionally, Jack Quaid reprises his role as Richie Kirsch in an uncredited video cameo. Thom Newell appears as Greg Bruckner, a film student at Blackmore University and Jason's roommate. Tim Robinson voiced Paul 2.0, Quinn's lover, who was killed off-screen, while Matthew Giuffrida portrayed his body. Directors Matt Bettinelli-Olpin and Tyler Gillett can be seen in the subway scene.

== Production ==
=== Development ===
Prior to the release of Scream 4 (2011), series creator Kevin Williamson claimed he had already "mapped out" Scream 5 and Scream 6, but would wait to see the box office success of the fourth installment before signing on for any more films. In July 2014, Williamson revealed that Scream 4 was intended to kick off a new trilogy of films, but the film "never took off in a way they hoped". Williamson also said that he would likely not be involved in any further entries, as the series director Wes Craven and his team were "done" with him. In Williamson's initial pitch, Scream 5 saw Jill Roberts being stalked by a killer at her college campus, while Scream 6 would feature Gale Weathers as the main character and deal with her relationship with Dewey Riley.

In January 2022, Neve Campbell, David Arquette, Matt Bettinelli-Olpin, and Tyler Gillett expressed interest in making future films in the series. Courteney Cox would later express an interest in a sequel while doing publicity for Shining Vale. A sixth film was officially green-lit on February 3, 2022, by Spyglass Media Group. Olpin and Gillett of Radio Silence would return to direct while James Vanderbilt and Guy Busick would write the script once again. By the end of the month, Campbell was approached to return for the film. The following month, Cox had received the script and was courted to reprise her role. Also in March, the sixth film's release date was set for March 31, 2023. A few weeks later, plot details emerged, setting the film outside of Woodsboro. By June, it was announced the film would take place in New York City. Ortega said the film would feature a more "aggressive and violent" Ghostface than in previous entries.

=== Casting ===
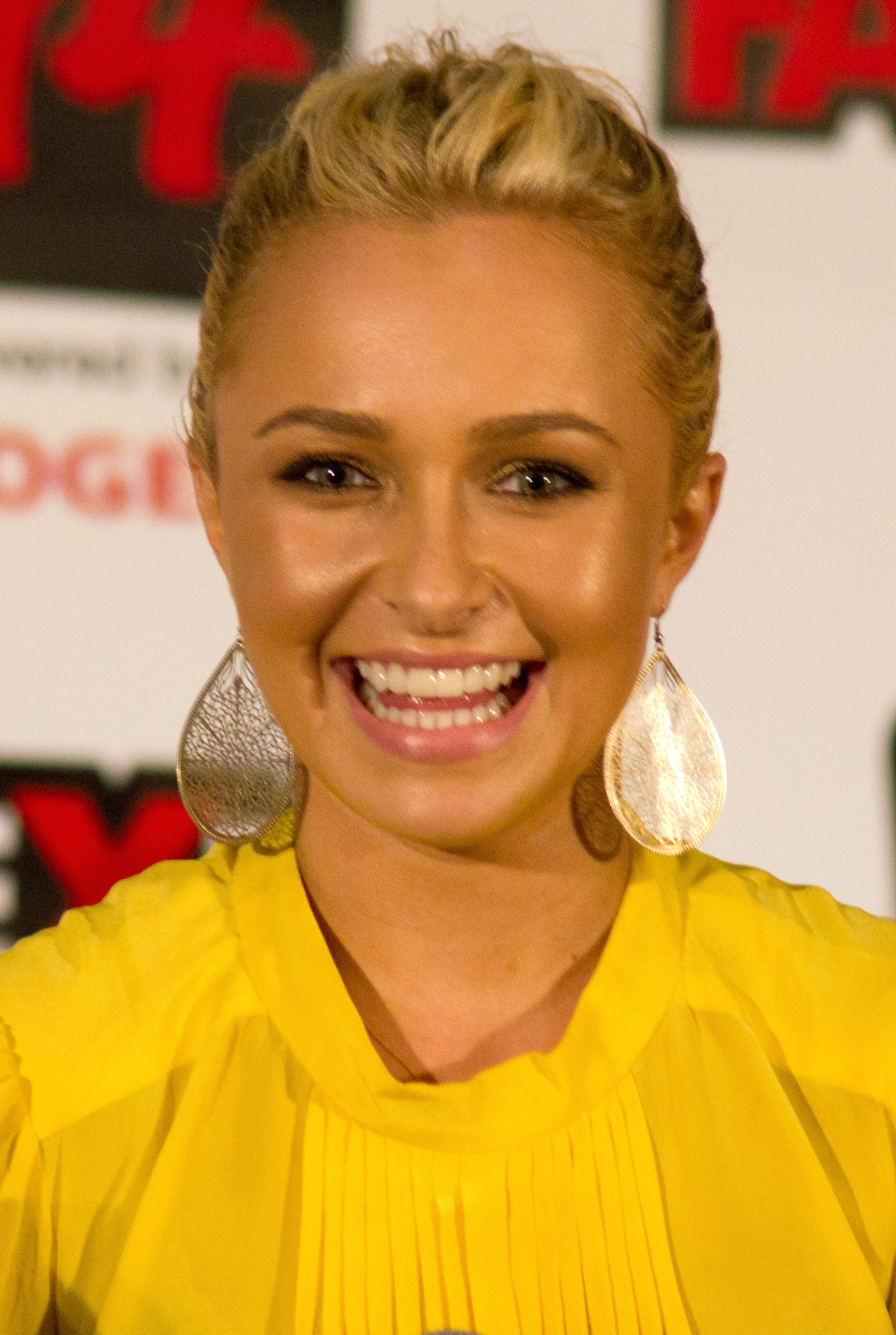
Hayden Panettiere reprised her role as Kirby Reed.

In May 2022, it was announced that Melissa Barrera, Jasmin Savoy Brown, Mason Gooding, and Jenna Ortega would all return for the sixth film. The following day, it was announced that Hayden Panettiere would reprise her role of Kirby Reed from the fourth film. When asked about her involvement in the film, Cox claimed that her contract was not yet completed. Also in June, it was announced that Dermot Mulroney had joined the cast, playing a police officer, and Cox officially confirmed her involvement with the film. On June 16, Jack Champion, Liana Liberato, Devyn Nekoda and Josh Segarra joined the cast, followed by Henry Czerny on June 23. Samara Weaving and Tony Revolori were both announced as cast members on July 14.

==== Neve Campbell's involvement ====
On June 6, 2022, it was announced Neve Campbell would not be returning as Sidney Prescott for the sixth film. The actress made a statement about how her contract and salary negotiations had stalled with Paramount Pictures:

"As a woman I have had to work extremely hard in my career to establish my value, especially when it comes to Scream. I felt the offer that was presented to me did not equate to the value I have brought to the franchise. It's been a very difficult decision to move on. To all my Scream fans, I love you. You've always been so incredibly supportive to me. I'm forever grateful to you and to what this franchise has given me over the past 25 years."

Campbell expanded on her statement a few weeks later, saying she could not bear "walking on set and feeling undervalued" and that the offer would have been different had she been a man.

IndieWire noted Campbell had spent 26 years acting in the franchise and announced it was "the end of an era". David Arquette stated, "I'd love for her to be a part of it. A Scream movie without Sidney is kind of unfortunate, but I understand her decision. It's all a business in a way, they have to balance all these elements to fit a budget and produce a film." Jasmin Savoy Brown and Melissa Barrera – as well as former Scream co-stars Emma Roberts, Sarah Michelle Gellar, Matthew Lillard, and Jamie Kennedy – also expressed their support for Campbell's decision and praised her contributions to the series. In March 2023, Courteney Cox told Variety that she missed working with Campbell on the movie but was going to "support whatever she feels is right". Even though she would not be in the film, it was said the script still contained references to and was "protective" of the Sidney character.

In December 2022, Radio Silence Productions commented on Campbell's absence, saying her absence affected the script "greatly." However, in March 2023, the pair said the script had changed "very little" since Campbell had exited "early enough in the process". In both instances, they said they decided to use the change as an opportunity to focus more on other characters, particularly the four young survivors from the previous film. They also mentioned how much they love both Campbell and the Sidney character and that she could return in future installments.

=== Filming ===
Principal photography began on June 9, 2022, in Montreal, Canada. Vanderbilt, Paul Neinstein and William Sherak produced under Project X Entertainment, while Chad Villella, Cathy Konrad, Marianne Maddalena and Williamson served as executive producers. Hayden Panettiere posed for a set photo on August 6, along with Jasmin Savoy Brown, that was picked up by various media outlets given her return to the franchise. Courteney Cox revealed she had finished filming her part as of August 14. Filming ended in late August.

The subway scene was done without a green screen, largely relying on practical effects. According to director of photography Brett Jutkiewicz, "The special effects team was actually able to tow the car into and out of our subway platform set. So, there's some brief moments when you can see the car stopping at a station. That's actually practical. It's being pulled from a black fabric tunnel onto our subway platform set and you can actually see it pulling in." However, Jutkiewicz did originally protest the subway train flicker effects: "I definitely said to the directors, 'Is that too much? It's not totally realistic that it would flicker that much.' And they were like, 'No, we love it. It works.' And I think that's the whole thing about this film: we're creating this heightened naturalism where, even if something isn't super true to reality, we wanted it to be true enough to make you feel like you are in these environments while we heighten the experience and lean into the tension and the emotional experience the characters are going through."

The film's climax features a projection of a fictional movie made by the character Richie Kirsch. Some of the footage shown is actually from actor Jack Quaid's real-life home videos, interspliced with footage for the film, with voiceovers also provided by Quaid. The film features many homages and items from previous films inside the theater museum. The items used were not actually the original props from previous films but rather were recreated by the film's art and costume departments.

== Music ==
The film is scored by Brian Tyler, returning from the previous installment. Sven Faulconer co-scored the film with Tyler. American singer Demi Lovato released "Still Alive" on March 3, 2023, by Island Records as the lead single of the film's soundtrack. Mike Shinoda from Linkin Park released a solo song as part of the Scream VI soundtrack, "In My Head", on March 10, featuring Kailee Morgue. The film's soundtrack score album was released on March 10 by Paramount Music.

== Release ==
Scream VI had its world premiere at AMC Lincoln Square Theater on March 6, 2023. The film was released in the United States on March 10, 2023, by Paramount Pictures. It was originally set for release on March 31, 2023. The film was released in conventional theaters alongside RealD 3D (the first and so-far only 3D release), 4DX and Dolby Cinema formats.

=== Marketing ===
In several cities, a viral marketing stunt occurred, as the studio's marketing firm sent individuals wearing a Ghostface costume and mask to stand motionless in front of cameras and walk around the streets, resulting in multiple 911 calls from unsettled residents. The marketing campaign also included the launch of a website that allowed American users to receive personalized phone calls from Ghostface, Scream-themed meals in different Chain pop-up dinners and an immersive walk-through featuring props and reconstructed sets from the franchise in California; the walk-throughs included appearances by directors and producers Radio Silence Productions, along with actors Mason Gooding, Dermot Mulroney and Tony Revolori.

=== Home media ===
Scream VI was released digitally on April 25, 2023, in the US, where it also began streaming on Paramount+ and various other regions. It was released on VOD on May 9, 2023, in other regions, such as the UK and Ireland. Its DVD, Blu-ray and Ultra HD Blu-ray would be released in the US and some regions on July 11, 2023, and later a Blu-ray 3D release by German distributor Turbine on February 8, 2025, one year ahead of the next film's release. Upon its release, the film debuted at #1 on the UK Official Film Chart Top 40. The film grossed $5.8 million in home media sales.

Scream (2022) and Scream VI became available in a two-movie digital collection on April 25, 2023.

== Reception ==
=== Box office ===
Scream VI grossed $108.4 million in the United States and Canada, and $58.2 million in other territories, for a worldwide total of $166.6 million. Deadline Hollywood calculated the net profit of the film to be $60 million, when factoring together all expenses and revenues.

In the United States and Canada, Scream VI was projected to gross $35–40 million from 3,675 theaters in its opening weekend. The film made $19.3 million on its first day, including $5.7 million from Thursday night previews. It went on to debut to $44.4 million, marking the highest opening weekend of the franchise and finishing first at the box office. Of the opening weekend audience, 71 percent of the audience was between the ages of 18 and 34 (with 42 percent being between 18 and 24), while 51 percent were male. It made $17.5 million in its second weekend, finishing second behind newcomer Shazam! Fury of the Gods, and then $8.4 million in its third weekend, finishing fourth. The film crossed the $100 million mark on April 5, becoming the first of the franchise to do so domestically since Scream 2 (1997). It became the highest-grossing film in the franchise at the United States and Canada box office in unadjusted dollars.

=== Critical response ===
On the review aggregator website Rotten Tomatoes, 77% of 316 critics' reviews are positive, with an average rating of 6.7/10. The website's consensus reads: "Certain aspects of horror's most murderously meta franchise may be going stale, but a change of setting and some inventive set pieces help keep Scream VI reasonably sharp." Metacritic, which uses a weighted average, assigned the film a score of 61 out of 100, based on 53 critics, indicating "generally favorable" reviews. Audiences polled by CinemaScore gave the film an average grade of B+ on an A+ to F scale, while those at PostTrak gave it an overall 87% positive score, with 74% saying they would definitely recommend it.

Chicago Sun-Times's Richard Roeper gave the film three out of four stars, writing "Nevertheless, off we go on another aggressively gruesome, wickedly funny and at times cleverly staged Scream-fest that cheerfully defies logic while hitting all the right notes we've come to expect from the franchise." He praised the performances of Barrera, Ortega and Brown and felt the film's ending was "the most outlandish and spectacularly brutal ending of all". Owen Gleiberman, writing for Variety, gave the film a positive review despite finding it "too long", noting that it "is a pretty good thriller [...] [and] a gory homicidal shell game that's clever in all the right ways, staged and shot more forcefully than the previous film, eager to take advantage of its more sprawling but enclosed cosmopolitan setting".

Benjamin Lee from The Guardian gave the film a four-star rating out of five, describing it as gorier and a smarter follow-up to Scream (2022). Simon Thompson from The Playlist gave the film an A and described Panettiere as "the active ingredient here, the bolt from the blue, and she revels in the role, delivering a real treat for die-hard fans". Bleeding Cool writer Aedan Juvet described the sixth entry as a "perfect" genre film, praising Panettiere's return to the franchise. In a review rated four out of five stars, Clarisse Loughrey of The Independent called the film "bloody, satisfying and ridiculously fun" and similarly praised the performance of Panettiere, who "plays the role with a sly wit". Cox was also praised for her performance, being considered a "highlight" by many critics, with particular accolades for her chase scene.

Olly Richards, reviewing the film for Empire, gave it three out of five stars, opining that it was "still far more inventive and entertaining than most horror franchises of a similar vintage", yet "one of the sillier series entries in terms of plot, but still scary enough and funny enough to leave you hoping Ghostface might yet kill again". Jeffrey Anderson, writing for Common Sense Media, wrote "While this slasher sequel is bogged down by complicated lore and is far more brutal than it is actually scary, the strong characters and an effective mystery come together to make it a cut above. Fans of the franchise will likely want to rewatch the previous five movies before tackling Scream VI, as it has many, many references to them." Frank Scheck of The Hollywood Reporter gave it a mixed review, believing the film to be a satisfying addition to the franchise by blending nostalgia with a fresh take, but concluded that it was "not exactly cutting-edge anymore".

Among the most critical was Slash Film's Jack Hawkins, who named Scream VI one of the most disappointing horror films of 2023. "Unfortunately, no amount of NYC establishing shots can distract you from just how rinsed this franchise has become," Hawkins added.

=== Accolades ===
Accolades received by Scream VI
Award	Date of ceremony	Category	Nominee(s)	Result	Ref.
Golden Scythe Horror Awards	December 8, 2023	Best Actress in a Leading Role	Melissa Barrera	Nominated	
Hollywood Critics Association Midseason Film Awards	June 30, 2023	Best Horror	Scream VI	Nominated	
MTV Movie & TV Awards	May 7, 2023	Best Fight	Courteney Cox (as Gale Weathers) vs. Ghostface	Won	
MTV Movie & TV Awards	May 7, 2023	Best Movie	Scream VI	Won	
MTV Movie & TV Awards	May 7, 2023	Best Song	Demi Lovato for "Still Alive"	Nominated	
Saturn Awards	February 4, 2024	Best Horror Film Release	Scream VI	Nominated	
People's Choice Awards	February 18, 2024	The Drama Movie of the Year	Scream VI	Nominated	
People's Choice Awards	February 18, 2024	The Drama Movie Star of the Year	Jenna Ortega	Won	
People's Choice Awards	February 18, 2024	The Female Movie Star of the Year	Jenna Ortega	Nominated	
Critics' Choice Super Awards	April 4, 2024	Best Actress in a Horror Movie	Jenna Ortega	Nominated	
Critics' Choice Super Awards	April 4, 2024	Best Horror Movie	Scream VI	Nominated	

== Sequel ==
In March 2023, Bettinelli-Olpin and Gillett were "hopeful" for a seventh film in the series and said they would like to continue to see more films in the franchise "whether we're involved or not". They also stated that they wanted Campbell to return in future installments, saying "we'd love to be able to make another movie with her, and we're not giving up".

In August, Christopher Landon was announced as the director of the seventh film. Production had been slowed by the 2023 Writers Guild of America and SAG-AFTRA strikes; plans were pushed back again on November 21, when Barrera was fired from the film for social media posts in support of Palestine during the Gaza war which were interpreted as antisemitic by producers.

It was also reported that screenwriters Vanderbilt and Busick were now tasked with "starting from scratch". On December 23, Landon announced that he was no longer associated with the sequel, saying: "I guess now is as good a time as any to announce I formally exited Scream 7 weeks ago. It was a dream job that turned into a nightmare. And my heart did break for everyone involved. Everyone. But it's time to move on."

In March 2024, Campbell wrote on her Instagram that she would return as Sidney. She also confirmed that Kevin Williamson, the writer and producer of several previous Scream films, would direct from a script by Busick, with Radio Silence returning as executive producers. Cox, Arquette, Gooding and Brown will also reprise their respective roles as Gale Weathers, Dewey Riley and twins Chad and Mindy Meeks-Martin.

Scream 7 was theatrically released in the United States in February 2026 by Paramount Pictures.
