= Judy Hicks =

Fictional character in the Scream film series

- Scream character
- Marley Shelton as Judy Hicks in Scream 4
- First appearance: Scream 4 (2011)
- Last appearance: Scream (2022)
- Created by: Kevin Williamson
- Portrayed by: Marley Shelton

In-universe information
- Occupation: Deputy sheriff (formerly); Sheriff of Woodsboro, California
- Family: Wes Hicks (son; deceased)
- Nationality: American
- Status: Deceased

Judy Hicks is a fictional character in the Scream franchise. She first appears in Scream 4 (2011) as a deputy sheriff in Woodsboro, and returns in Scream (2022) as the town's sheriff. The character was created by Kevin Williamson and portrayed by Marley Shelton.

Judy works hard as a deputy and respects Dewey Riley. She makes lemon squares for her coworkers and helps with police work whenever needed. In Scream (2022), she is the sheriff and takes care of her teenage son Wes Hicks, on her own. She runs the police department while staying friendly and handling her duties as a mother. Her son, named after filmmaker Wes Craven, was given the name as a tribute to the director of the Scream films.

== Appearances ==
In Scream 4 (2011), Judy Hicks is a deputy sheriff in Woodsboro. She looks up to sheriff Dewey Riley and often makes lemon squares for her coworkers. She also helps with police work whenever it is needed. Judy meets Sidney Prescott, a classmate from high school, though Sidney does not remember her. She watches over the Robert family home during the Ghostface attacks and helps Dewey and Gale Weathers during the investigation. In the final fight with Jill Roberts, she takes cover behind a hospital bed. Jill shoots her in the chest, but she survives by wearing a bulletproof vest. Afterward, she faints from exhaustion.

In Scream (2022), Judy is the promoted sheriff of Woodsboro and cares for her son Wes Hicks. When Ghostface returns, she tries to keep Wes and his friends safe. She is caught off guard at home by Amber Freeman and is killed.

== Characterization and casting ==
Judy Hicks was created by Kevin Williamson for Scream 4 (2011) as a deputy sheriff and a red herring. She caused some tension between Dewey Riley and Gale Weathers but stayed loyal and capable. Her habits, like baking lemon squares and being cheerful, made her a memorable supporting character. More than ten years later, by the time of Scream (2022), Judy has become the sheriff. She is a protective mother, focused on keeping her son Wes safe while running the town's police department.

The character was portrayed by Marley Shelton. Shelton described returning to Woodsboro after a decade as a unique experience, noting that her portrayal of Judy had to reflect both professional growth and her development as a mother. Shelton said the filmmakers kept the franchise's mix of humor and horror while giving the character more depth.

== Reception ==
Judy Hicks is a memorable supporting character in the Scream franchise. Samuel R. Murrian of Collider noted her role as a mother, showing how it adds emotion as Ghostface targets her son, Wes Hicks. Patrick Cavanaugh of ComicBook.com said Judy's promotion to sheriff and her protective instincts show her growth since Scream 4.

Heather Wixson of Daily Dead commended Shelton captured Judy's quirky but capable personality, mixing humor with the tension of a horror scenario. Rotem Rusak of Nerdist wrote that Judy's rise from deputy to sheriff is a good example of a secondary character getting a bigger role. Grace Magee of CBR said Judy's death at the hands of Ghostface was shocking and sad, making her one of the franchise's most memorable supporting characters.
