= Guy Busick =

American film and television screenwriter

- Born: United States
- Occupations: Film screenwriter; Television writer
- Years active: 2016–present
- Notable work: Scream; Ready or Not; Scream VI; Final Destination Bloodlines

Guy Busick is an American film and television screenwriter best known for his collaborations with directors Matt Bettinelli-Olpin and Tyler Gillett, including Ready or Not (2019), Scream (2022), Scream VI (2023), and Abigail (2024).

== Career ==
In 2016, Busick began his writing career by drafting the story for the thriller film Urge. He transitioned to television by writing episodes of Stan Against Evil and Castle Rock. In 2019, he began his series of collaborations with directors Matt Bettinelli-Olpin and Tyler Gillett by drafting the screenplay for the horror film Ready or Not. In 2020, he continued his collaborations with Bettinelli-Olpin and Gillett with the horror film Reunion, though the film has yet to begin production.

The following year, he gained notability from writing the script for the slasher revival film Scream (2022), and would also write the sequels Scream VI (2023) and Scream 7 (2026). In October 2024, it was announced that he would write a sequel to Ready or Not. He also co-wrote the sixth film of the Final Destination series, Final Destination Bloodlines.

== Filmography ==
Year	Title	Notes
2016	Urge	Story only
2016–18	Stan Against Evil	Episodes: "Life Orr Death", "Curse of the Werepony", and "Demon Who Came in From the Heat"
2019	Ready or Not	Also actor; with R. Christopher Murphy
2019	Castle Rock	Episodes: "Restore Hope" and "The Word"
2022	Scream	with James Vanderbilt
2023	Scream VI	with James Vanderbilt
2024	Abigail	with Stephen Shields
2025	Final Destination Bloodlines	with Lori Evans Taylor and co-wrote the story with Jon Watts and Lori Evans Taylor
2026	Scream 7	with Kevin Williamson; co-wrote story with James Vanderbilt; also executive producer
2026	Ready or Not 2: Here I Come	with R. Christopher Murphy; also executive producer

== Nominations ==
His work on Ready or Not was nominated for best screenplay at the 2020 Fangoria Chainsaw Awards. For his work on Scream, he was nominated at the 47th Saturn Awards for Best Writing.
