= Jack Quaid =

American actor (born 1992)

- Quaid at Dragon Con in 2026
- Born: Jack Henry Quaid; April 24, 1992 (age 34); Los Angeles, California, U.S.
- Education: Crossroads School; NYU Tisch
- Occupation: Actor
- Years active: 2012–present
- Spouse: Claudia Doumit (m. 2026)
- Parents: Dennis Quaid (father); Meg Ryan (mother)
- Relatives: Randy Quaid (paternal uncle); Andrew Hyra (maternal uncle); Gene Autry (first cousin three times removed)

Jack Henry Quaid (born April 24, 1992) is an American actor. The son of actors Meg Ryan and Dennis Quaid, he is also the nephew of character actor Randy Quaid. He made his acting debut with a minor role in the dystopian film The Hunger Games (2012). Quaid was part of the main cast of the drama series Vinyl (2016) and had a supporting role in the film Logan Lucky (2017). His breakout role was as vigilante Hughie Campbell in the satirical superhero series The Boys (2019–2026).

Quaid has voiced Bradward "Brad" Boimler in the series Star Trek: Lower Decks (2020–2024) and Superman in My Adventures with Superman (2023–present). He played Richie Kirsch in the slasher film Scream (2022) and physicist Richard Feynman in Oppenheimer (2023) and has since taken on starring roles in the films Companion and Novocaine (both 2025).

== Early life ==
Quaid was born in Los Angeles on April 24, 1992, the only child of Meg Ryan and Dennis Quaid. He was president of the Bad Movie Club at Crossroads School for Arts & Sciences in Santa Monica, California, and attended New York University Tisch School of the Arts for three years.

== Career ==
In 2012, Quaid made his film debut as Marvel in the film The Hunger Games. In 2013, he reprised Marvel for a flashback scene in The Hunger Games: Catching Fire in a cameo appearance. Following his involvement with the Hunger Games franchise, Quaid took part in a series of independent films, including his own film Roadies, which was funded through donations on the crowdsourcing website Indiegogo. During this time, he was part of the sketch comedy troop Sasquatch Sketch, which was active from 2013 to 2017, produced dozens of comedy videos, and performed live in the Los Angeles area. Quaid also acted in other comedic webseries and shorts.

Quaid appeared in the main cast of the short-lived 2016 television series Vinyl. In 2017, he appeared in Steven Soderbergh’s heist comedy Logan Lucky, and starred as Jordan Welch in the horror comedy film Tragedy Girls.

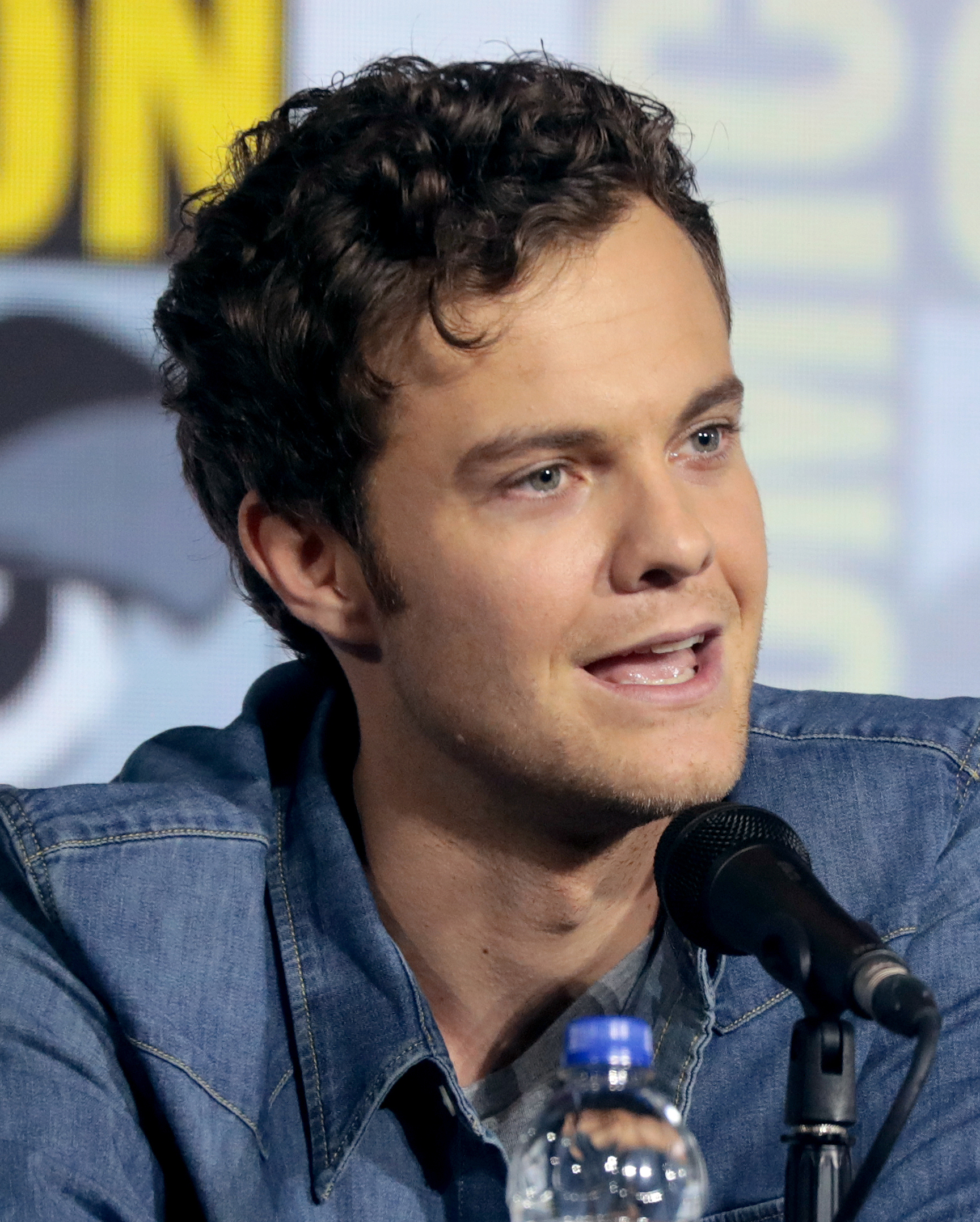
Quaid at the 2019 San Diego Comic Con

From 2019 to 2026, Quaid played Hugh "Hughie" Campbell, the lead role of The Boys. Quaid and his fellow The Boys co-star Erin Moriarty both appeared in the 2018 music video for Creedence Clearwater Revival's song "Have You Ever Seen the Rain?".

Quaid voiced the role of Ensign Bradward "Brad" Boimler in the CBS All Access Paramount Plus animated series Star Trek: Lower Decks (2020–2024). This follows his voice acting role on the animated series Harvey Girls Forever! Quaid also starred in 2019's romantic-comedy Plus One and appeared in the 2022 Scream self-titled sequel.

In 2023, Quaid played a live action version of Ensign Bradward "Brad" Boimler in a crossover with Star Trek: Strange New Worlds called "Those Old Scientists." Quaid played a supporting role in Christopher Nolan's historical epic Oppenheimer (2023) as the physicist Richard Feynman. In 2024 he appeared as Nick Plinkett in the online series Half in the Bag as well as an episode of Best of the Worst.

In 2025, Quaid starred in Companion as Josh, boyfriend of the titular companion robot Iris and also had a main role in Novocaine as Nathan Caine.

== Personal life ==
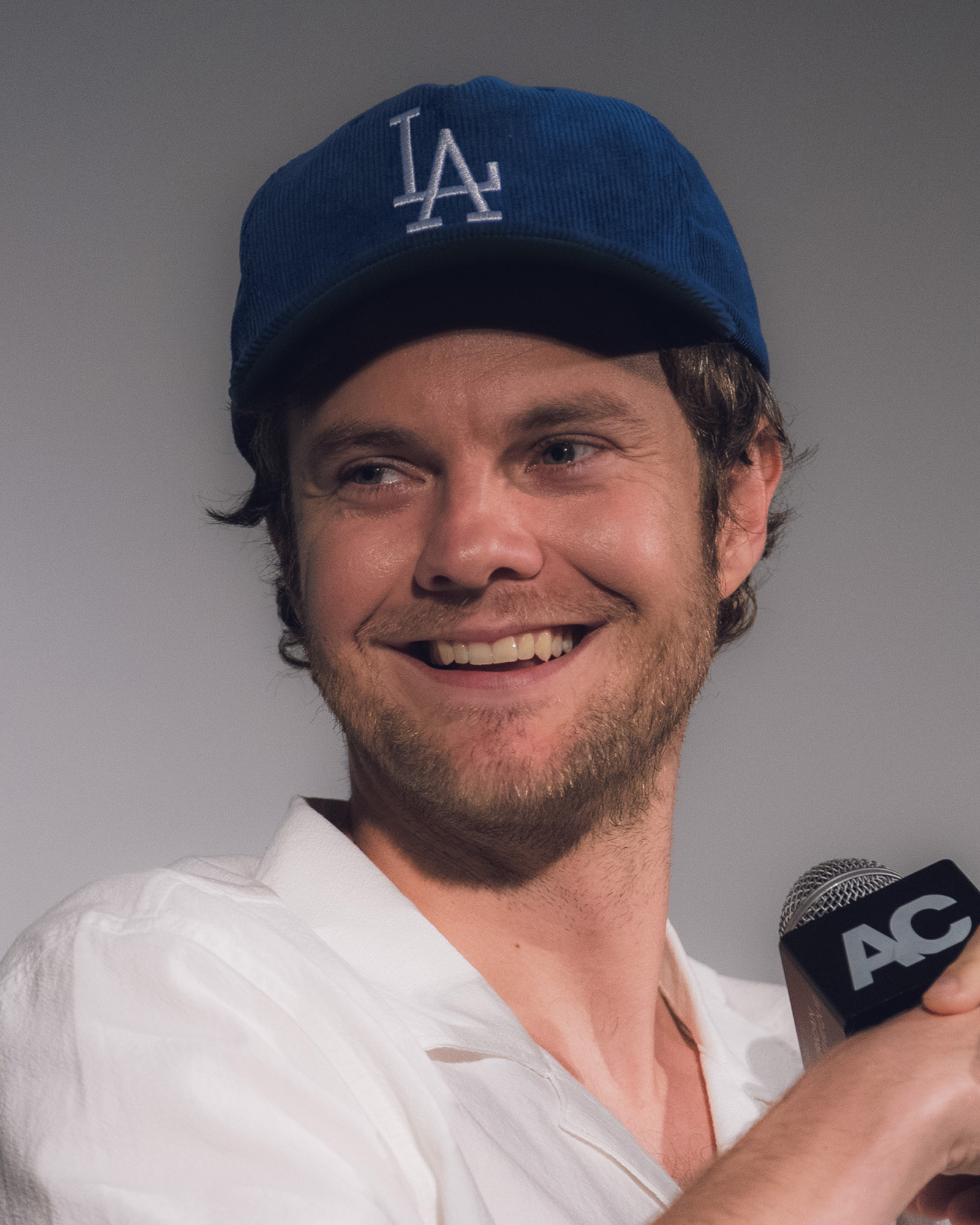
Quaid in 2025

Quaid dated actress Lizzy McGroder from 2016 to 2021. In February 2024, Quaid confirmed he was dating Australian actress and The Boys co-star Claudia Doumit. The pair had been romantically linked since 2022 after being spotted holding hands during The Boys season 3 press-tour in Sydney. Quaid and Doumit were married at Mona Farm in Braidwood, New South Wales, Australia in a private ceremony on April 18, 2026.

== Filmography ==
=== Film ===
Year	Title	Role	Notes	Reference(s)
2012	The Hunger Games	Marvel		
2012	The World is Watching: Making the Hunger Games	Himself	Documentary	
2012	Just 45 Minutes from Broadway	Danny		
2013	The Hunger Games: Catching Fire	Marvel	Cameo	
2014	Just Before I Go	Dylan		
2015	Running Wild	Eric		
2015	Ithaca	Marcus Macauley		
2016	Aberrant	Cole	Formerly known as Vineland	
2017	Logan Lucky	Fish Bang		
2017	Tragedy Girls	Jordan Welch		
2018	Rampage	Connor		
2018	Smallfoot	Pilot	Voice role	
2019	Plus One	Ben King		
2021	Batman: The Long Halloween: Part One	Alberto Falcone	Voice role, direct-to-video	
2022	Scream	Richard "Richie" Kirsch		
2023	Scream VI	Richard "Richie" Kirsch	Uncredited cameo	
2023	Spider-Man: Across the Spider-Verse	Earth-65 Peter Parker / Lizard	Voice role	
2023	Oppenheimer	Richard Feynman		
2025	Companion	Josh		
2025	Novocaine	Nathan Caine		
2025	Neighborhood Watch	Simon McNally		
2025	Heads of State	Marty Comer		
2026	Close Personal Friends †	TBA	Post-production	

Key
†	Denotes films that have not yet been released

=== Television ===
Year	Title	Role	Notes	Reference(s)
2013	Mrs.	Jack	Episode: "The Blind Date"	
2016	Vinyl	Clark Morelle	10 episodes; Main role	
2017	Workaholics	Clark	Episode: "Party Gawds"	
2017	The Tap	Warren Michaels	Episode: "Pilot"	
2019–2026	The Boys	Hugh "Hughie" Campbell	40 episodes, lead role	
2019–2020	Harvey Girls Forever!	Richie Rich	Voice, main role (27 episodes)	
2020–2024	Star Trek: Lower Decks	Bradward "Brad" Boimler	Voice, main role (50 episodes)	
2020–2024	The Ready Room	Himself	6 episodes; Aftershow	
2020	Aunty Donna's Big Ol' House of Fun	Clyde Whittings	Episode: "'Lympics"	
2021	Solos	Zen	Voice, episode: "SASHA"	
2021–2024	Solar Opposites	Tanner, Travis, Tomblr Crundle	Voice, 3 episodes	
2023–present	My Adventures with Superman	Kal-El / Clark Kent / Superman, Bizarro	Voice, main role (20 episodes)	
2023	Star Trek: Strange New Worlds	Ensign Bradward "Brad" Boimler	Episode: "Those Old Scientists"	
2024	Family Guy	Cool Kid #2	Voice, episode: "Teacher's Heavy Pet"	
2027	Invincible	Chris / Gravitator	Voice, season 5	

=== Video games ===
Year	Title	Role	Notes	Reference(s)
2014	Middle-earth: Shadow of Mordor	Dirhael	Voice role and motion capture performance	
2017	Middle-earth: Shadow of War	Dirhael	Voice role and motion capture performance	
2026	God of War Sons of Sparta	Eis	Voice	
2027	God of War Laufey	Phranque	Voice role and motion capture performance	

=== Web series ===
Year	Title	Role	Notes	Reference(s)
2021	Vought News Network: Seven on 7 with Cameron Coleman	Hughie Campbell	Episode: "January 2022"	
2021-2022	Star Trek: Lower Decks Logs	Ensign Bradward "Brad" Boimler	Voice, 3 episodes	
2022-2026	Best of the Worst	Himself	3 episodes	
2023	5-Second Films	Himself	4 episodes	
2024	The Re-Slayer's Take	Sweeny	Voice, episode: "The Timberblight of Dead Man's Table"	
2024	Half in the Bag	Nick Plinkett	Top 10 Horror Movies (2024) Part 1	
2024	re:View	Himself	Galaxy Quest Review	
2024	The Footy with Broden Kelly	Himself	Episode: "Jack Quaid Loves The Footy"	

=== Music videos ===
Year	Title	Artist	Role	Ref.
2018	"Have You Ever Seen the Rain?"	Creedence Clearwater Revival	Evan	
2022	"Goddammit"	Jasmin Savoy Brown	Cis Man	

== Awards and nominations ==
Year	Award	Category	Work	Result	Ref.
2019	IGN Summer Movie Awards	Best TV Ensemble (Note: Shared with Karl Urban, Antony Starr, Erin Moriarty, Dominique McElligott, Jessie T. Usher, Laz Alonso, Chace Crawford, Tomer Capone, Karen Fukuhara, Nathan Mitchell and Elisabeth Shue)	The Boys	Nominated	
2020	IGN Summer Movie Awards	Best TV Ensemble (Note: Shared with Karl Urban, Antony Starr, Erin Moriarty, Dominique McElligott, Jessie T. Usher, Laz Alonso, Chace Crawford, Tomer Capone, Karen Fukuhara, Nathan Mitchell and Colby Minifie)	The Boys	Nominated	
2021	Critics' Choice Super Awards	Best Voice Actor in an Animated Series	Star Trek: Lower Decks	Nominated	
2021	MTV Movie & TV Awards	Best Hero	The Boys	Nominated	
2021	Pena de Prata	Best Ensemble in a Limited Series or Anthology Series or TV Special (Note: Shared with Morgan Freeman, Anne Hathaway, Uzo Aduba, Anthony Mackie, Dan Stevens, Helen Mirren, Constance Wu, Nicole Beharie and Sanaa Lathan)	Solos	Nominated	
2025	Astra TV Awards	Best Supporting Voice-Over Performance	Star Trek: Lower Decks	Won	
2025	Critics' Choice Super Awards	Best Actor in an Action Movie	Novocaine	Nominated	
2025	Critics' Choice Super Awards	Best Actor in a Science Fiction/Fantasy Movie	Companion	Nominated	
