= Joey Bustos =

American musician

- Born: Joseph Michael Bustos
- Genres: Punk rock, Alternative Rock, Rock, Ska Punk, Garage Rock
- Occupations: Musician, Drummer
- Instruments: Drums, Vocals
- Years active: 1993–present
- Label: Asian Man Records Capitol Records

Joey Bustos is an American musician.

== Biography ==
Bustos was born in San Francisco and raised in Richmond, California.

== Music ==
=== 1993–2004 ===
Joey Bustos was the drummer and a founding member of the influential punk band Link 80. The members later changed the musical direction of the band, and in 2002, changed the name of the band to Desa. Bustos left Desa after the release of their 2003 album Year in a Red Room.

=== 2005–present ===
He played drums in Street To Nowhere from 2005 to 2008 and currently plays drums in the San Francisco-based rock and roll/soul band The Soft White Sixties, who composed the 2013 album Get Right.

In 2016, Bustos participated in a Link 80 reunion for the Asian Man Records 20th anniversary. On June 17 and 18, the band played two sold-out shows at San Francisco's Bottom of the Hill. The lineup also included singer Ryan Noble, guitarists Matt Bettinelli-Olpin and Adam Davis, bassists Adam Pereria and Barry Krippene, and horn players Aaron Nagel, Steve Borth and Jason Lechner. Prior to the shows, a video tribute to Nick Traina was shown; the band released the video online on June 20, 2016.

On May 21, 2021, a Link 80 cover of Rancid's "Junkie Man" was released from Lavasock Records' upcoming 25th anniversary tribute to Rancid's punk rock classic ...And Out Come the Wolves featuring Bustos on drums.

== Discography ==
- The Link 80 & Wet Nap Split (1995)
- Remember How It Used To Be EP (1995)
- Rumble At The Tracks EP (1996)
- 17 Reasons (1996)
- Killing Katie (1997)
