= Aaron Nagel =

American painter and musician

- Born: California, United States
- Occupations: Musician, Artist
- Years active: 1994–present
- Notable work: The Calming
- Website: Two Twenty Two Design Studio

Aaron Nagel is an American painter and the original trumpet player for punk rock/ska core act Link 80, born and raised in Berkeley, California.

He later played guitar in the band DESA with other former Link 80 members Ryan Noble, Adam Davis, and Barry Krippine.

He currently runs Two Twenty Two Design Studio and is an artist whose work has adorned two Rx Bandits albums (his paintings "Predictable" and "Look Left ...And The Battle Begun" are the covers of The Resignation and ...And the Battle Begun respectively) as well as DESA's split EP with Howards Alias and their latest album "Arriving Alive".

His paintings have been shown solo and in group shows across the country since 2005.

In 2016, Nagel participated in a Link 80 reunion for the Asian Man Records 20th Anniversary. On June 17 and 18, the band played two sold-out shows at the San Francisco's Bottom of the Hill. The lineup included singer Ryan Noble, guitarists Matt Bettinelli-Olpin and Adam Davis, drummer Joey Bustos, bassists Adam Pereria and Barry Krippene, and horn players Steve Borth and Jason Lechner. Prior to the shows, a video tribute to Nick Traina was shown that the band released the video online on June 20, 2016.

Nagel is vegan straight edge.

== Discography ==
- The Link 80 & Wet Nap Split (1995)
- Remember How It Used To Be EP (1995)
- Rumble At The Tracks EP (1996)
- 17 Reasons (1996)
- Killing Katie (1997)
