= Link 80 =

American punk rock band

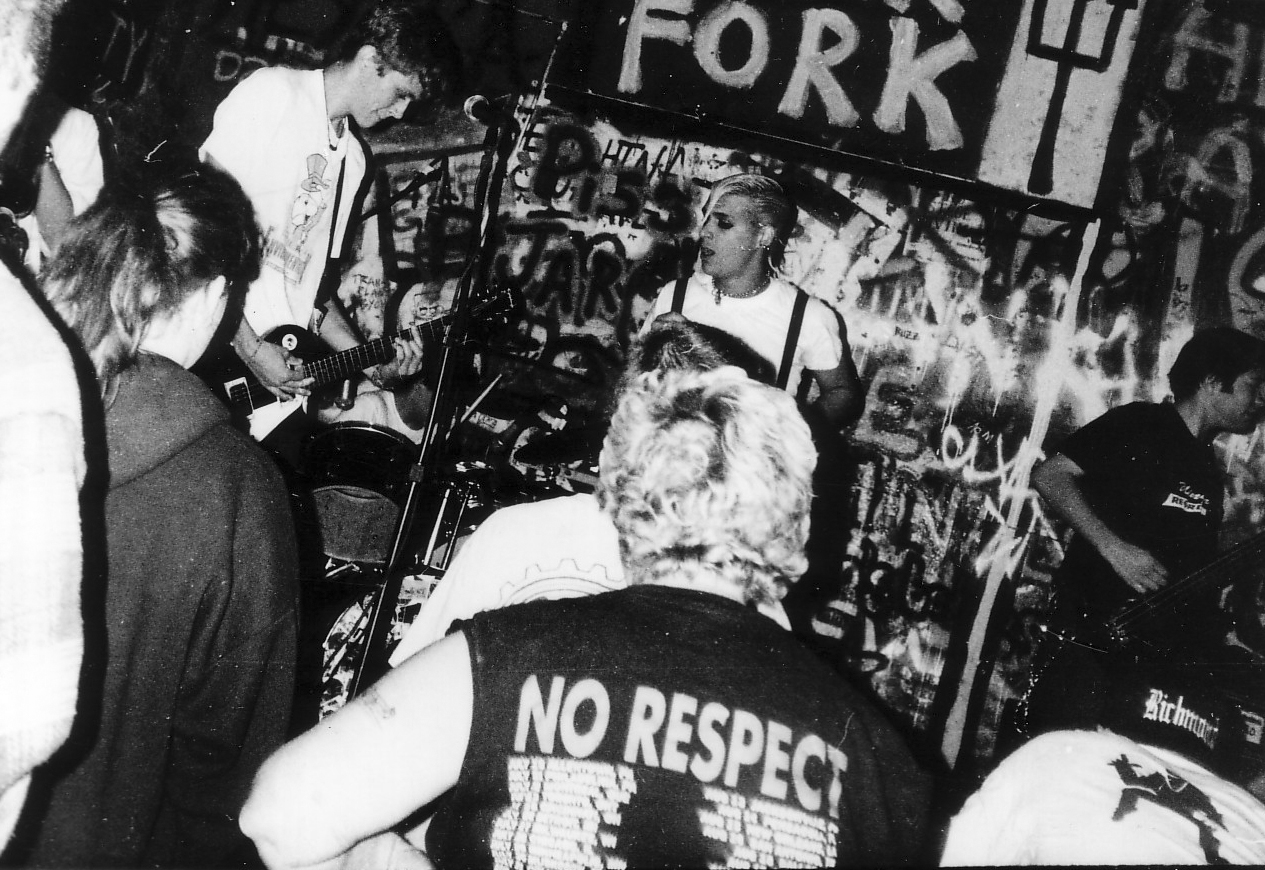
- Matt Bettinelli-Olpin, Nick Traina and Adam Pereira. 924 Gilman Street, 1996.

Background information
- Origin: Bay Area, U.S.
- Genres: Punk rock, pop punk, ska punk, hardcore, skacore
- Years active: 1993–2002, 2016
- Label: Asian Man Records
- Past members: Nick Traina; Matt Bettinelli-Olpin; Aaron Nagel; Joey Bustos; Adam Pereira; Adam Davis; Jason Lechner; Seth Blankenship; Ryan Noble; Barry Krippene; Steve Borth; Brian Beggs; Stoney Moak; Noah Enelow; Matt Croda

Link 80 was an American punk rock/ska punk band from the East Bay, California.

== Band history ==
Link 80 started in the summer 1993 in the East Bay of California. In the beginning, original members (guitarist Matt Bettinelli-Olpin, drummer Joey Bustos, bassist Adam Pereira and singer Jeff Acree) played around the Easy Bay as Drano and The Rag-Tags before settling on Link 80.

The name came from the interstate highway I-80 which they used to get to the drummer's garage for band practice and connected the band members' homes: members lived in Oakland, Berkeley and Richmond.

In May 1995, Nick Traina joined the band after meeting Adam at a show in San Francisco's Mission District. Nick's passion and voice combined with the rest of the band to make them different from most ska bands and gave Link 80 the "against the rest" attitude they display throughout their lyrics. Far more punk than ska and with an energy and a sense of immediacy lacking in pop-oriented ska bands, Link 80 was able to avoid the clichés of ska-punk characterized by their peers. As Asian Man Records describes them, they are an energetic blend of ska, punk rock, and hardcore.

The band's lyrics, audio samples and album artwork are notable for their diverse use of film and television references including The Twilight Zone, The Usual Suspects, American Me, Happy Gilmore, Stand by Me, Pretty In Pink and I Walked with a Zombie.

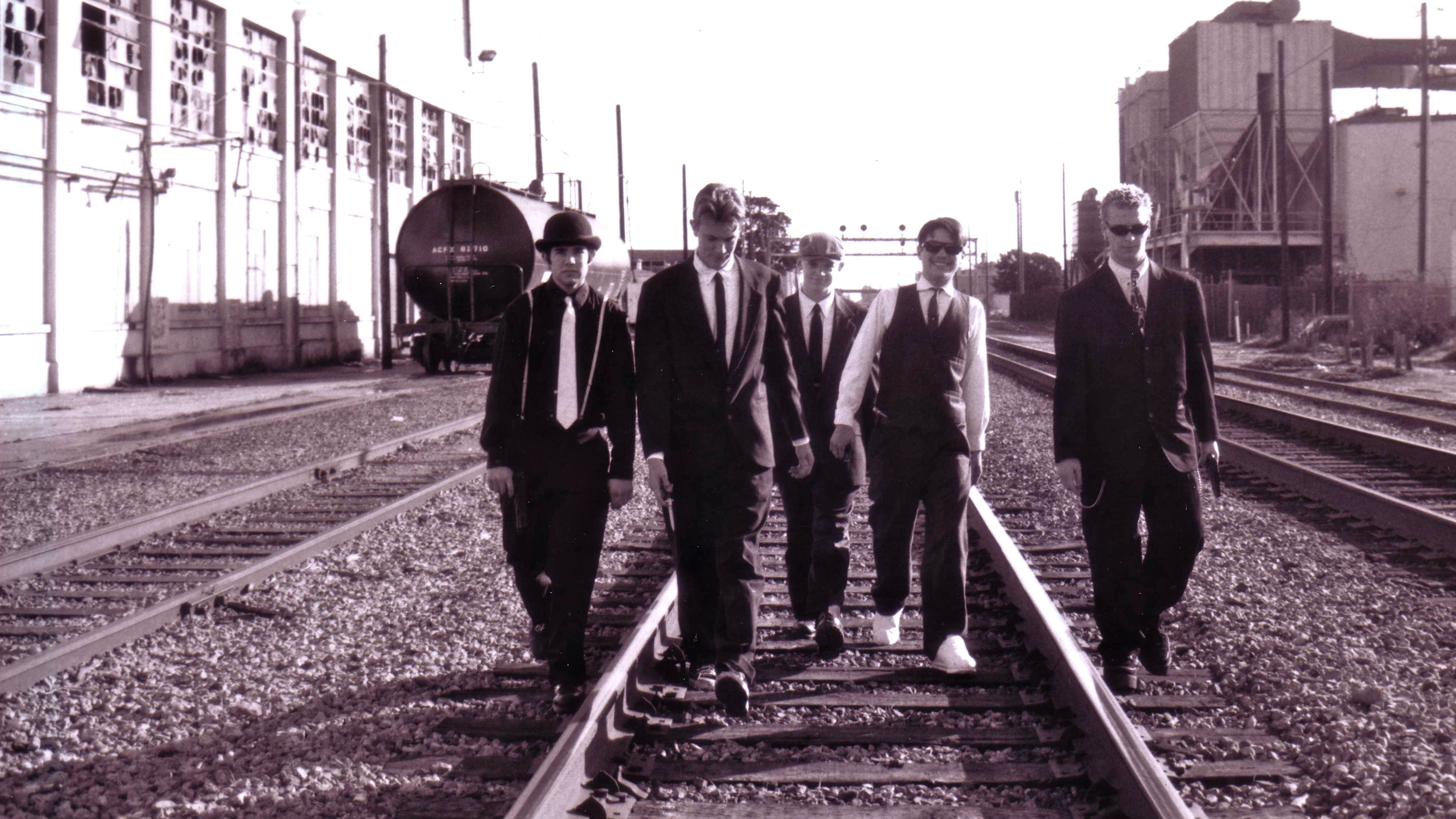
Link 80. 1996. Adam Pereria, Matt Bettinelli-Olpin, Aaron Nagel, Joey Bustos, Nick Traina. Berkeley, California.

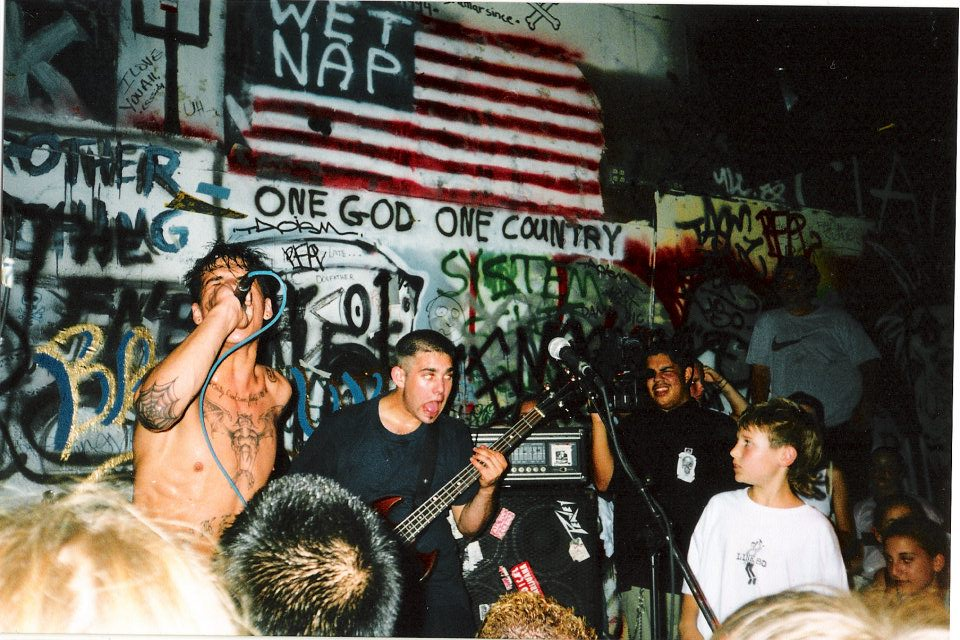
Nick Traina and Adam Pereria at 924 Gilman Street, 1997.

Before recording their first album, the band released three 7"'s, The Link 80 & Wet Nap Split, Remember How It Used To Be, and Rumble at the Tracks.

=== 17 Reasons ===
Recorded in 1996, Link 80 had released their first full-length album titled 17 Reasons, in early 1997. The album consisted of 17 fast and energetic punk rock and skacore songs (and one hidden track, a cover of "Who Killed Marilyn?" by Misfits). It was also the first album recorded for Asian Man Records (AMR1-AMR4 were originally released on Dill Records).

The album title and a song title ("Turn It Around") come from two of the band's favorite local Bay Area punk rock compilations: Turn It Around! and 17 Reasons: The Mission District. Their only official music video was off this album for the song "Verbal Kint." The video was partially filmed at 924 Gilman Street and directed by Scott Pourroy.

In 1996, with all the members still in high school, the band left for their first U.S. tour. On this tour, the band created their own "crew," known as ATRC, or Against the Rest Crew.

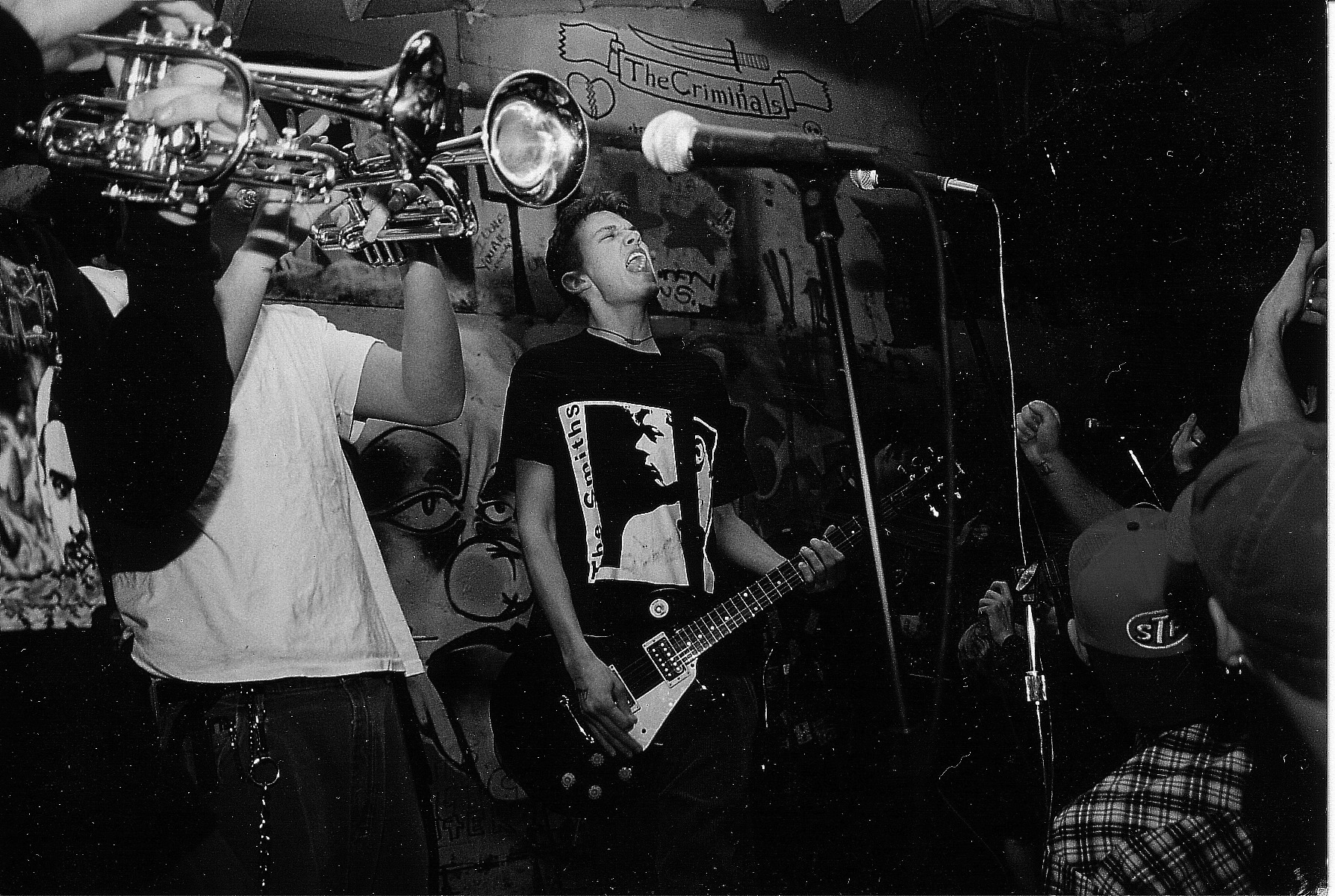
Matt Bettinelli-Olpin at 924 Gilman Street, 1997.

The core line-up for these definitive years was Nick Traina (vocals), Joey Bustos (drums), Matt Bettinelli-Olpin (guitar, vocals), Adam Pereira (bass, vocals) and Aaron Nagel (trumpet). Though he was not present on the recording of 17 Reasons, Jason Lechner (saxophone) joined the band in time to support it at shows and on tour. This line-up would release the first and second of their three albums.

Unlike many bands, each member of Link 80 were an integral part of the songwriting team. With Aaron in charge of the horn lines, Joey, Adam and Matt were behind most songs' core-music, while Nick and Matt were responsible for the lyrics. In addition, everyone participated in background vocals, occasionally even singing lead. For example, Adam sings a majority of "Termination" and "Slap," while Matt provides the lead vocals on "Turn It Around."

The following year Link 80 was on to its second US tour. Beginning in Oregon on June 14, the tour was cut short after a show at the Globe in Milwaukee, Wisconsin on August 1. The following morning the band went their separate ways, with some members flying home, some driving, and some taking a train.

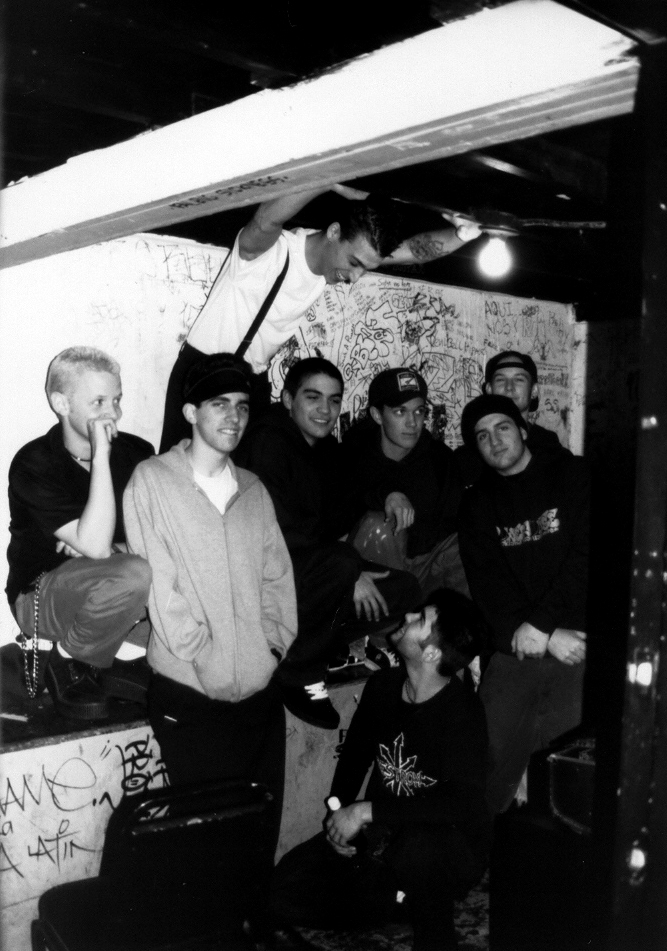
Aaron Nagel, Brian Beggs, Nick Traina, Joey Bustos, Matt Bettinelli-Olpin, Adam Pereira (seated), Kramer Croda, Jason Lechner. Berkeley Square, 1997

=== Killing Katie ===
Link 80's last album with Nick, Matt and Seth Blankenship, Killing Katie, was released August 26, 1997, less than one month before Nick's death. The album contains 8 studio tracks and 3 hidden live songs, including the long-time crowd pleaser "Blank Mind" (of which there is no studio version). Of the four hidden tracks, the first is a cover of Buffalo Springfield's "For What It's Worth," referred to as "Everybody Look What's Going Down" by the band.

After Link 80, Nick started a new band, Knowledge, and immediately began playing shows and recording. Shortly thereafter, on September 20, 1997, Nick, who suffered from bipolar disorder, overdosed on his fourth suicide attempt, and was found dead by his caretaker at his home.

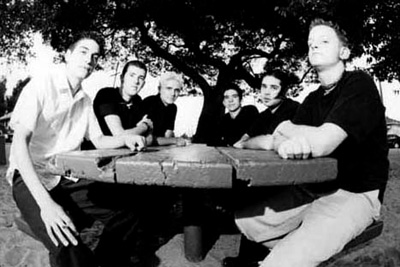
Link 80 in 2000. Joey Bustos, Ryan Nobel, Adam Davis, Steve Borth, Adam Pereria, Aaron Nagel.

=== The Struggle Continues ===
With Nick gone, Link 80 needed someone to fill in on vocals.

After recruiting a man named Stoney Moak to fill in for vocals temporarily for their shows, Ryan Noble from the Blast Bandits was chosen to pick up permanently where Nick had left off. Along with Ryan and Adam Davis, who took over for Matt, came a new sound and lyrics, while still maintaining the "against the rest" attitude. Link 80 began to lead more towards a hardcore/ska sound rather than a punk/ska sound. With Ryan, Link 80 recorded the album The Struggle Continues as well as some b-sides that appeared on various compilations in 1999 and toured numerous times with such bands as Capdown and MU330.

The last track on The Struggle Continues, "Unbroken", was written by ex-guitarist Matt for Nick after his death.

=== Reunion ===
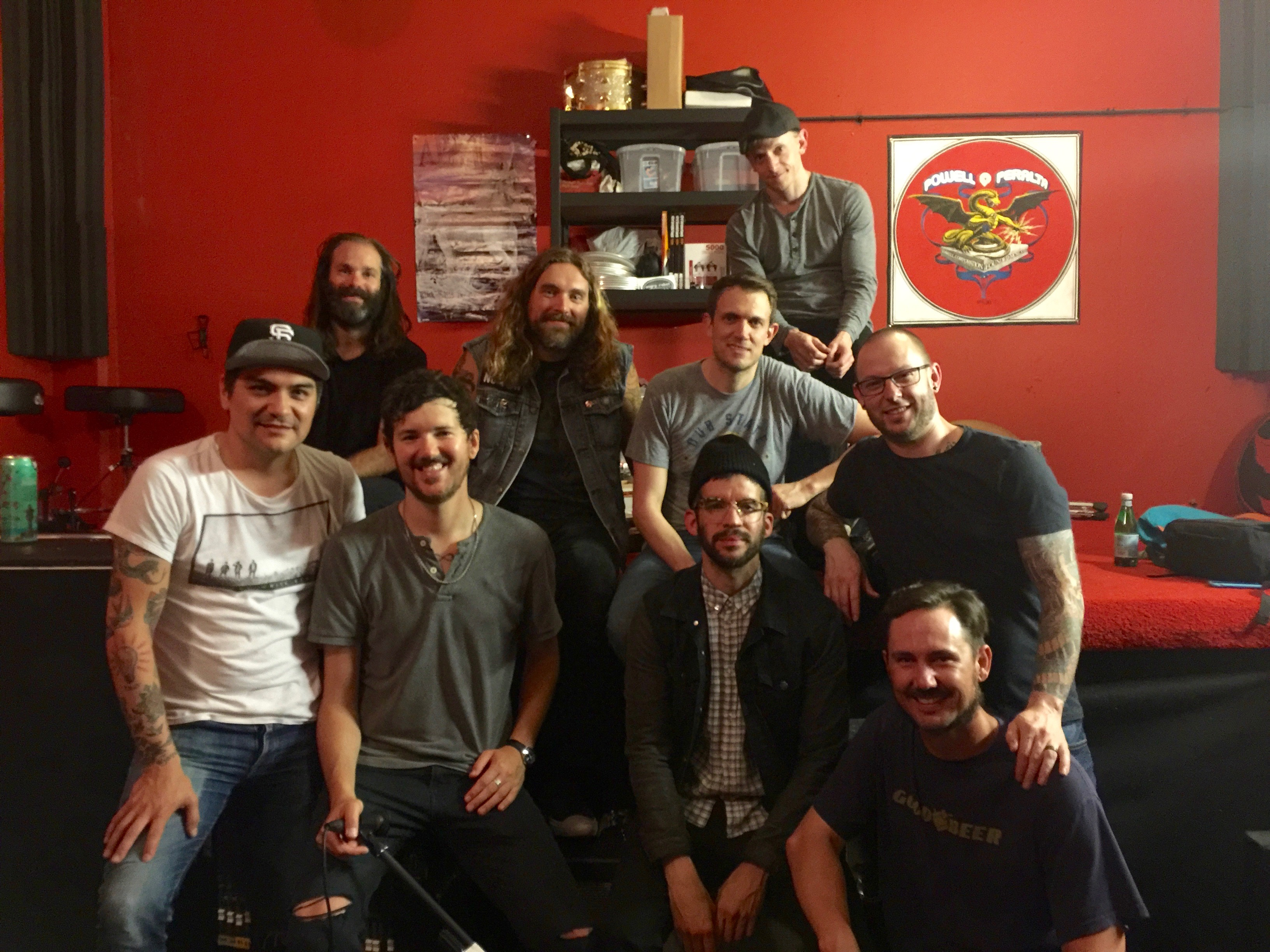
Top Row: Aaron Nagel. Middle Row: Adam Pereria, Adam Davis, Matt Bettinelli-Olpin, Jason Lechner. Bottom Row: Joey Bustos, Ryan Noble, Steve Borth, Barry Krippene.

After a few partial reunions over the years, the band's first official reunion was for the Asian Man Records 20th Anniversary shows on June 17 and 18, 2016. Both shows (at the San Francisco's Bottom of the Hill) were sold out.

The lineup included singer Ryan Noble, guitarists Matt Bettinelli-Olpin and Adam Davis, drummer Joey Bustos, bassists Adam Pereria and Barry Krippene, and horn players Aaron Nagel, Steve Borth and Jason Lechner.

Prior to the shows, a video tribute to Nick Traina was shown with Social Distortion's "When the Angels Sing" playing over the video. The band released the video online on June 20, 2016.

On May 21, 2021, a Link 80 cover of Rancid's "Junkie Man" was released from Lavasock Records' upcoming tribute to Rancid's punk rock classic ...And Out Come the Wolves titled ...And Out Come the Lawsuits. The newly recorded Link 80 song includes members Adam Davis, Barry Krippene, Joey Bustos, Matt Bettinelli-Olpin, Steve Borth and Ryan Noble.

On October 17, 2023, Mike Park announced that Asian Man Records would reissue 17 Reasons and The Struggle Continues on vinyl, as well as reprinting the band's first official shirt.

== Related bands and projects ==
In 2002, the band consisting of Seth Blankenship, Adam Davis, Aaron Nagel, Steve Borth, Joey Bustos, Barry Krippene, and singer Ryan Noble went on hiatus. Steve Borth would join Rx Bandits, before forming his own band Satori in 2006. The remaining Link 80 members would form DESA. They have since maintained that Link 80 would return, but for now they are focused on their respective projects.

Joey and Ryan are currently in The Soft White Sixties (playing drums and bass, respectively). Matt formed a band called Dolores (with Nick's brother Todd Traina) that released on 7" on Johann's Face Records, founded the filmmaking collectives Chad, Matt & Rob and Radio Silence and directed the films V/H/S, Southbound, and Ready or Not (all of which feature Link 80 and other Asian Man Records artists including Alkaline Trio, MU330, Laura Stevenson and the Cans and The Atom Age). Aaron is now a successful artist who runs Two Twenty Two Design Studio and whose work has been feature in galleries around the world and can be seen on the covers of The Resignation and ...And the Battle Begun. Adam Davis is currently in Gnarboots which has released their album A.L.B.U.M. on Asian Man Records. Barry is in a band called Terrible Timing with a former member of the Blast Bandits. Adam Pereria played with Thought Crime after leaving Link 80. Nick Traina started Knowledge before his death in 1997. Their album, A Gift Before I Go, was subsequently released by Asian Man Records. As of 2019, Steve Borth and Adam Davis are a part of a new ska/punk project, Omnigone which released an album on Bad Time Records in 2019. The band also features current and former members of RX Bandits, Link 80, Skatune Network and We Are The Union. Adam Davis stated: "The idea behind OMNIGONE: I want to play ska, punk & hardcore. Playing with Link 80 in 2016 was bittersweet. I miss playing music with my ex-bandmates, but there was too much involved to expect us to play shows again. This allows different configurations of my close friends to come together & play the music we grew up playing."

== Members ==
- Nick Traina – lead vocals (1995–1997)
- Matt Bettinelli-Olpin – guitars, vocals (1993–1998, 2016)
- Joey Bustos – drums, backing vocals (1993–2002, 2016)
- Aaron Nagel – trumpet, backing vocals (1994–2002, 2016)
- Adam Pereira – bass, vocals (1993–2000, 2016)
- Adam Davis – guitars, vocals (1997–2002, 2016)
- Ryan Noble – lead vocals (1998–2002, 2016)
- Jason Lechner – saxophone (1997–1998, 2016)
- Seth Blankenship – saxophone (1997–1999, 2016)
- Barry Krippene – bass (2000–2002, 2016)
- Steve Borth – saxophone, backing vocals (1998–2002, 2016)
- Stoney Moak – lead vocals (1998)

Timeline

== Discography ==
=== LPs ===
- 17 Reasons (1997, Asian Man Records) Recorded in 1996
- Killing Katie (1997, Asian Man Records)
- The Struggle Continues (2000, Asian Man Records)

=== EPs ===
- The Link 80 & Wet Nap Split 7" w/ Wet-Nap (1995, Wannabe Brothers Records)
- Remember How It Used to Be 7" (1995, Switchblade Records)
- Rumble at the Tracks Split 7" w/ Subincision (1996, Switchblade Records)
- Nothing Lasts Forever Split 7" w/ Punishment Park (1998, Dream Circle Records) Given away for free at shows in Germany.
- Lifestyles, Textiles & X-Files Split 7" w/ Lesdystics (Tomato Head Records)
- Split CDEP/7" w/ Capdown (Householdname Records)

=== Compilations ===
- Skank for Brains (1995, Beach Records)
- What Are You Looking At? (1996, Switchblade Records)
- This Aren't Two Tone (1997, Too Hep Records)
- Cinema Beer Nuts (1997, Hopeless Records)
- Misfits of Ska II (1997, Asian Man Records)
- 23 Reasons (1997, Tachyon Records) This contains the first two albums on one CD, only available in Japan.
- The Mongolian Wild Turkey.... Volume 4 (1997, Bad Stain Records)
- It Takes a Dummy to Know a Dummy (1997, Dumb Ass Records)
- Punk Goes Ska (1997, Stiff Dog Records)
- Punk 'til Ya Poop (1997, Bad Stain Records)
- Ramen Core Volume 1 (1997, Burnt Ramen Records)
- Dillinquents (1997, Dill Records)
- Unrealism (Function Productions, 1997)
- Puro Eskanol Volume 2 (1998, Aztlan Records)
- Ska Sucks (1998, Liberation Records)
- Mailorder Is Fun! (1998, Asian Man Records)
- Puro Eskanol, Vol. 2: Rice & Beans (1998, Aztlan Records)
- Skank for Brains: Saturday Matinee (1998, Beach Records)
- Waiting for Punk? (1998, Twisted Records)
- Ska: The Third Wave Checkered Box Set (1998, Beloved Records)
- Ska: The Third Wave, Vol. 4: Punk It Up (1998, Beloved Records)
- Hey Brother...Can You Spare Some Ska? (1999, Vegas Records)
- Mailorder Is Still Fun! (1999, Asian Man Records)
- Mission Control Presents: Dr. Strange Vs. Asian Man, Vol. 1 (1999, Asian Man/Dr. Strange Records)
- Punker Than Your Mother (1999, Sour/Soda Jerk Records)
- To Protect and Serve - Chapter 13 (1999, Chapter 13 Records)
- Coffee, Cigarettes and Nuclear War (1999, Absolute Zero Records)
- Punk Goes Metal (2000, Fearless Records)
- Plea for Peace (2000, Asian Man Records)
- Just Not Punk Enough (2000, Orchard Records)
- Here We Are Nowhere (2000, Substandard Records)
- Punked Up Love (2000, VMS Records)
- Taken from a High School Journal (2000, Deafinit Records)
- Have You Heard (2001, New School Punk Records)
- Ten Minutes to Ogikubo Station (2001, Asian Man Records)
- Shut the Punk Up, Vol. 1 (2001, Orchard Records)
- Dropping Food on Their Heads Is Not Enough: Benefit for RAWA (2002, Geykido Comet Records)
- Mailorder for the Masses! (2002, Asian Man Records)
- Lessons for Today (2003, Almost Good Music)
- The Great Soup Opera (Wormhole/Atomic Records)
