= James Vanderbilt =

American filmmaker (born 1975)

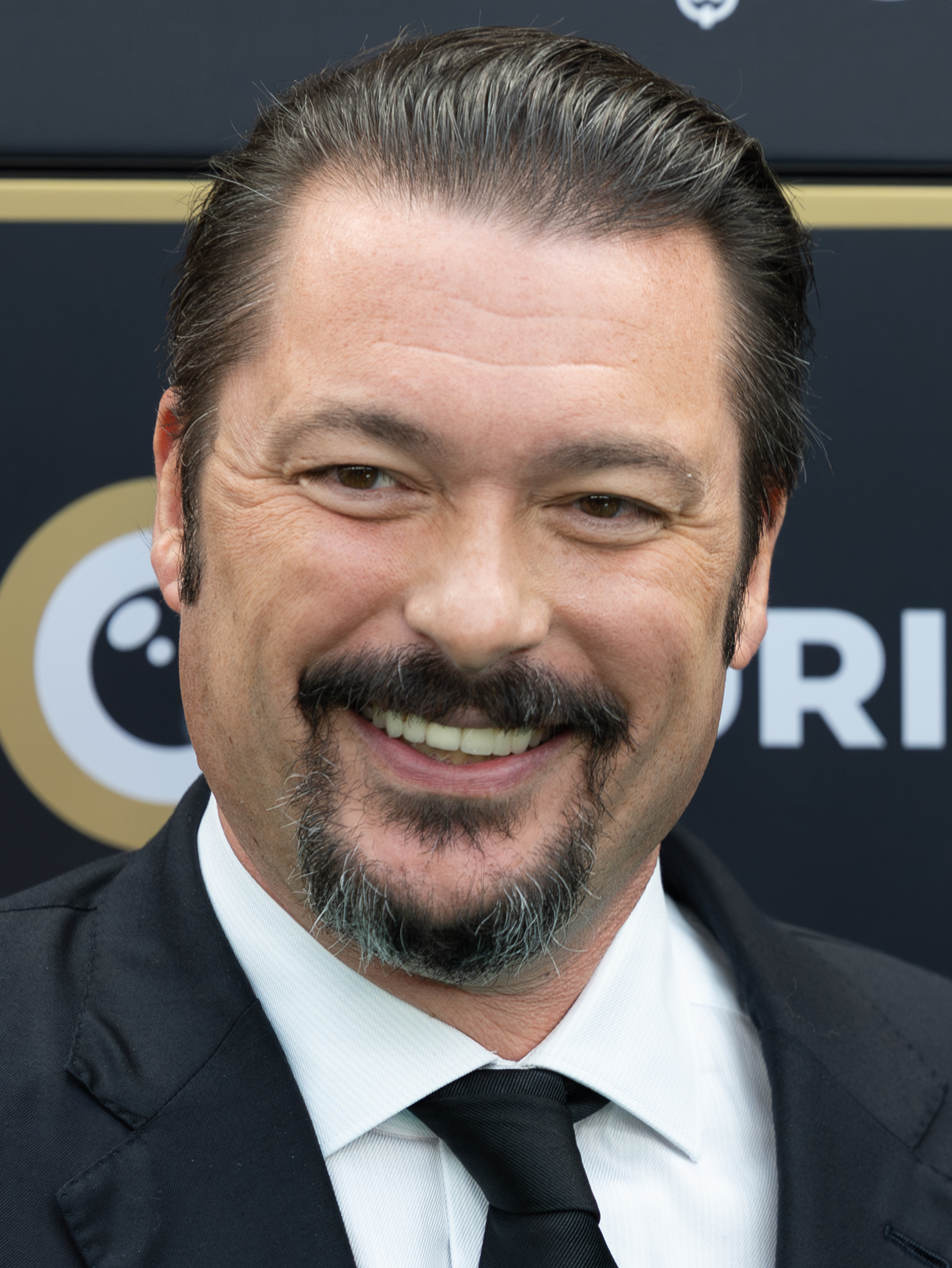
- Vanderbilt at the 2025 Zurich Film Festival
- Born: James Platten Vanderbilt; November 17, 1975 (age 50)
- Education: University of Southern California
- Occupations: Screenwriter; director; producer
- Spouse: Amber Freeman (m. 2005)
- Children: 2
- Father: Alfred Gwynne Vanderbilt III
- Relatives: Vanderbilt family

James Platten Vanderbilt (born November 17, 1975) is an American film director, screenwriter, and producer. He is best known for writing the films Zodiac (2007), The Amazing Spider-Man (2012) and its sequel The Amazing Spider-Man 2 (2014), and Independence Day: Resurgence (2016). He co-wrote, produced, and co-storied Scream (2022), Scream VI (2023) and Scream 7 (2026). Vanderbilt produced several films, including The House with a Clock in Its Walls (2018), Ready or Not (2019) and Ready or Not 2: Here I Come (2026). He also wrote, directed, and co-produced Truth (2015) and Nuremberg (2025).

== Early life and education ==
A sixth-generation member of the Vanderbilt family of New York, James is the son of Alison Campbell (née Platten) and Alfred Gwynne Vanderbilt III. His paternal great-grandfather Alfred Gwynne Vanderbilt Sr. died on the RMS Lusitania in the 1915 sinking, his paternal grandfather, Alfred Gwynne Vanderbilt Jr., once chaired the New York Racing Association, and his maternal grandfather, Donald Campbell Platten, was the chief executive and chairman of Chemical Bank. Journalist Anderson Cooper is his second cousin through Cooper's mother, Gloria Vanderbilt.

Vanderbilt was raised in Norwalk, Connecticut, and attended school at New Canaan Country School. He is a graduate of St. Paul's School and the University of Southern California.

== Career ==
His production company, Mythology Entertainment, started in 2011. It was reincorporated as Project X Entertainment in 2019.

In May 2016, Mythology acquired intellectual property rights to Slender Man from the character's creator Eric Knudsen. Vanderbilt produced the film Slender Man in 2018.

In 2020, Vanderbilt co-wrote the script for Scream, the fifth installment of the Scream franchise. The film was released on January 14, 2022. Vanderbilt's most recent project, Nuremberg, is about the Nuremberg trials and was released on November 7, 2025.

== Personal life ==
In May 2005 Vanderbilt married Amber Freeman, daughter of Air Force Pilot Allan Freeman and actress Gunilla Hutton. Amber Vanderbilt is the Board Chair and Founder of the Malibu Education Foundation.

The couple have three sons.

== Filmography ==
Year	Title	Writer	Producer	Director	Notes
2003	Darkness Falls	Yes	No	Jonathan Liebesman	
2003	Basic	Yes	Yes	John McTiernan	
2003	The Rundown	Yes	No	Peter Berg	
2007	Zodiac	Yes	Yes	David Fincher	
2010	The Losers	Yes	No	Sylvain White	
2012	The Amazing Spider-Man	Yes	No	Marc Webb	
2013	White House Down	Yes	Yes	Roland Emmerich	
2014	The Amazing Spider-Man 2	Story	No	Marc Webb	
2015	Truth	Yes	Yes	Himself	Directorial debut
2016	Independence Day: Resurgence	Yes	No	Roland Emmerich	
2018	Slender Man	No	Yes	Sylvain White	
2018	The House with a Clock in Its Walls	No	Yes	Eli Roth	
2019	Murder Mystery	Yes	Yes	Kyle Newacheck	
2019	Ready or Not	No	Yes	Matt Bettinelli-Olpin; Tyler Gillett	Cameo, Mr. Le Bail
2022	Scream	Yes	Yes	Matt Bettinelli-Olpin; Tyler Gillett	
2022	Ambulance	No	Yes	Michael Bay	
2022	Bed Rest	No	Yes	Lori Evans Taylor	
2023	Scream VI	Yes	Yes	Matt Bettinelli-Olpin; Tyler Gillett	
2023	Murder Mystery 2	Yes	Yes	Jeremy Garelick	
2024	Abigail	No	Yes	Matt Bettinelli-Olpin; Tyler Gillett	
2025	Fountain of Youth	Yes	Yes	Guy Ritchie	
2025	Nuremberg	Yes	Yes	Himself	
2026	Scream 7	Story	Yes	Kevin Williamson	
2026	Ready or Not 2: Here I Come	No	Yes	Matt Bettinelli-Olpin; Tyler Gillett	Cameo, Mr. Le Bail
2027	The Mummy: Book of the Dead	No	Yes	Matt Bettinelli-Olpin; Tyler Gillett	
TBA	White Elephant	No	Yes	Eli Craig	

Executive producer

- Altered Carbon (2018)
- Suspiria (2018)
- American Dream/American Knightmare (2018)
- The Night Agent (2023)
- Ghost Soldier (2026)
