= Murder Mystery 2 =

2023 film by Jeremy Garelick

- Release poster
- Directed by: Jeremy Garelick
- Written by: James Vanderbilt
- Based on: Characters by James Vanderbilt
- Produced by: Adam Sandler; Allen Covert; Tripp Vinson; Jennifer Aniston; James Vanderbilt; James D. Stern
- Starring: Adam Sandler; Jennifer Aniston; Mark Strong; Mélanie Laurent; Jodie Turner-Smith; John Kani
- Cinematography: Bojan Bazelli
- Edited by: Tom Costain; Brian Robinson
- Music by: Rupert Gregson-Williams
- Production companies: Happy Madison Productions; Echo Films; Endgame Entertainment; Mythology Entertainment; Vinson Films
- Distributed by: Netflix
- Release date: March 31, 2023
- Running time: 89 minutes
- Country: United States
- Language: English

Murder Mystery 2 is a 2023 American action comedy mystery film directed by Jeremy Garelick and written by James Vanderbilt. It is a sequel to the 2019 film Murder Mystery, and it stars Adam Sandler and Jennifer Aniston with Mark Strong, Mélanie Laurent, Jodie Turner-Smith, and John Kani.

Murder Mystery 2 was released on Netflix on March 31, 2023. Like its predecessor, the film received mixed reviews from critics.

== Plot ==
Nick and Audrey Spitz work as full-time private detectives, although their agency falls on hard times after a few bad cases. One night, while arguing about which direction to take their careers, the Spitzes receive a call from their friend, the Maharajah Vikram, who invites them to his wedding on his private island.

At the ceremony, Audrey notices a cloaked figure following Vik's elephant. A dead body falls from the elephant and turns out to be Lou, the bodyguard. Nick rightly suspects that it is a diversion but cannot prevent Vik's abduction by a mysterious figure who leaves the island on a boat. The couple determines that at least two perpetrators must have been involved: one to create the diversion and the other to kidnap Vik. The next morning, the group is joined by a team of professional detectives, led by former MI6 hostage negotiator Connor Miller. The kidnapper calls and demands a ransom of $70 million in exchange for Vik, arranging a meeting at the Arc de Triomphe.

Traveling to Paris, Miller takes Nick and Audrey to the exchange point. The kidnappers force the couple into a van at gunpoint. A fight ensues and the van crashes. The kidnappers frame Nick and Audrey for Vik's abduction and Miller is seemingly killed when his car explodes after taking back the briefcase of money. A mysterious figure retrieves the briefcase but is immediately run down by a second assailant in a garbage truck, who takes the briefcase and speeds off.

With the assistance of Inspector Delacroix, Nick and Audrey trace the truck to a countryside château where they are ambushed by Vikram's ex-fiancée Sekou and her submissive friend Imani, who, while admitting to trying to steal the money, insist they are not the kidnappers. Sekou shoots Imani and attempts to kill the couple by knocking over a candle to ignite the room, but is shot dead by a dying Imani. Nick and Audrey escape and call Delacroix and the others, requesting Vik be brought to the Le Jules Verne restaurant at the Eiffel Tower. Vik appears at the rendezvous, strapped into a bomb vest. Nick reasons that the killer would never jeopardize the ransom. The bomb's countdown is suspended, and Miller, the mastermind of the abduction, appears; he had faked his death by hiding in a bomb-proof titanium chamber within the car. He attempts to kill the group, but Audrey clings to his harness and is pulled to the top floor.

Nick pursues them, subdues Miller's men, and destroys the detonator to the bomb vest. Miller throws Audrey, who is still connected to his harness, off the tower. The two men engage in hand-to-hand combat, culminating with Nick opening the briefcase and dispersing the money into the wind. Audrey reappears and Nick helps her tie Miller's harness to the tower's elevator mechanism, throwing him into the rotor blades of his getaway helicopter, which explodes and crashes into the Seine.

Returning to the restaurant, Audrey mistakes Vikram's sister Saira's darkened arm for blood, but Saira insists that her henna smeared during the commotion. Audrey remarks that once dried, henna does not smear. She recalls that Saira was not present when Vik's elephant was ushered into the reception ceremony, and realizes that the clothes of the cloaked figure who killed Lou were stained by wet henna, not blood. This reveals Saira as the second conspirator, as well as the one who had previously made an attempt on Vik’s life in Mumbai, out of anger that he was made heir to their parents’ company over her. Exposed, Saira attempts to shoot Vik, but he is shielded by Ulenga, who takes the bullet. Claudette then knocks her out with the briefcase.

With the commotion concluded, Vik and Claudette decide to elope and later give Nick and Audrey $10 million and the use of Vik's helicopter. On a honeymoon in Greece, they are held at gunpoint by their supposedly European helicopter pilot, who turns out to be American; he steals the money and jumps out of the helicopter, leaving them scrambling for the controls.

== Cast ==
- Adam Sandler as Nick Spitz
- Jennifer Aniston as Audrey Spitz
- Mark Strong as Connor Miller
- Mélanie Laurent as Claudette Joubert
- Jodie Turner-Smith as Countess Sekou
- John Kani as Colonel Charles Ulenga
- Dany Boon as Inspector Laurent Delacroix
- Adeel Akhtar as Vikram Shivan Govindan, the Maharajah
- Kuhoo Verma as Saira, Vikram's Sister
- Enrique Arce as Francisco Perez
- Zurin Villanueva as Imani
- Jillian Bell as Susan
- Tony Goldwyn as Ron Silverfox
- Annie Mumolo as Mrs. Silverfox
- Myo Leong as Mr. Lou
- Carlos Ponce as Shitz helicopter pilot

== Production ==
=== Development ===
In October 2019, it was announced that a sequel to Murder Mystery was in development with Adam Sandler and Jennifer Aniston reprising their roles. In August 2021, Jeremy Garelick was hired as director, from a script by James Vanderbilt, with the filming of the sequel to take place in Paris and in the Caribbean. Sandler and Aniston had confirmed their returns during the September 2021 Tudum Global Fan Event.

In January 2022, it was reported that Adeel Akhtar and John Kani would be reprising their roles from the first film, with Mark Strong, Mélanie Laurent, Jodie Turner-Smith, Kuhoo Verma, Enrique Arce, Tony Goldwyn, Annie Mumolo, and Zurin Villanueva joining the film as newcomers.

=== Filming ===
Principal photography began in January 2022 in Hawaii and ended on April 8, 2022 in Paris, France.

The top three levels of the Eiffel Tower were recreated for the movie, but some stunts were actually shot on the tower itself. The Indian wedding dance scene was shot in Paris and choreographed by Mahina Khanum.

== Release ==
Murder Mystery 2 was released by Netflix on March 31, 2023. It reached Netflix's top 10 in over 90 countries.

Between its release and June 2023, the film totaled 173.6 million hours watched (equal to 117 million views).

== Reception ==
On the review aggregator website Rotten Tomatoes, 45% of 95 critics' reviews are positive, with an average rating of 4.9/10. The website's consensus reads: "A genially mediocre sequel to its similarly middling predecessor, Murder Mystery 2 could have been much better... and a whole lot worse." Metacritic, which uses a weighted average, assigned the film a score of 44 out of 100, based on 29 critics, indicating "mixed or average" reviews.

=== Accolades ===
Adam Sandler won the award for Best Comedic Performance at the 2023 MTV Movie & TV Awards.

== Audience viewership ==
According to U.S. streaming data published by Media Play News using PlumResearch figures, Murder Mystery 2 registered 13.3 million unique viewers and an average time spent of 73 minutes during the week ending April 2, 2023.
