= Murder Mystery (film) =

2019 film by Kyle Newacheck

- Release poster
- Directed by: Kyle Newacheck
- Written by: James Vanderbilt
- Produced by: Adam Sandler; Allen Covert; Tripp Vinson; James D. Stern; James Vanderbilt; A.J. Dix
- Starring: Adam Sandler; Jennifer Aniston; Luke Evans; Terence Stamp; Gemma Arterton; David Walliams; Dany Boon; John Kani
- Cinematography: Amir Mokri
- Edited by: Tom Costain
- Music by: Rupert Gregson-Williams
- Production companies: Happy Madison Productions; Endgame Entertainment; Vinson Films; Tower Hill Entertainment; Mythology Entertainment; Denver and Delilah Productions
- Distributed by: Netflix
- Release date: June 14, 2019
- Running time: 97 minutes
- Country: United States
- Language: English

Murder Mystery is a 2019 American comedy mystery film directed by Kyle Newacheck and written by James Vanderbilt. The film stars Adam Sandler, Jennifer Aniston, and Luke Evans, and follows a married couple who are caught up in a murder investigation on a billionaire's yacht. It was released on Netflix on June 14, 2019. It received mixed reviews from critics. A sequel, Murder Mystery 2, was released on Netflix on March 31, 2023.

== Plot ==
Nick Spitz is an NYPD officer married to Audrey, a hairdresser. She wants to visit Europe, as he had promised at their wedding, but thinks they never will. After their 15th-anniversary dinner, Audrey confronts Nick, who tells her he has in fact booked the trip, and they set off to Europe. On the plane, Nick and Audrey meet billionaire Charles Cavendish, who invites them to join him on his family yacht for a party celebrating his elderly uncle's wedding to Charles's former fiancée.

Aboard the yacht, Nick and Audrey meet Cavendish's ex-fiancée Suzi Nakamura, Quince's son Tobey, actress Grace Ballard, Colonel Ulenga, his bodyguard Sergei, Maharajah Vikram, and race car driver Juan Carlos, and, later that night, their host Malcolm Quince, Cavendish's uncle, arrives. Quince announces that Suzi will be his sole heir, crudely disowning everyone else. Before he can sign his new will, the lights go out, and when they are back on, they find Quince stabbed through his heart.

Nick orders the room locked, and the guests return to their rooms. Later that night, Tobey is found dead from apparent suicide. Upon arriving in Monte Carlo, everyone is questioned by Inspector Delacroix, who believes that "the Americans" committed the murders.

At the Monaco Grand Prix, Nick and Audrey question the guests. That night, Sergei summons them to his room and reveals Quince had married the Colonel's fiancée while he was in a coma after saving Quince's life, which ended with her dying while giving birth. The couple hide when someone knocks, and come out to find Sergei has been shot. They climb out the window and edge along the ledge. In the process, they see the Colonel flossing his teeth, and the Maharajah and Grace kissing. Audrey is furious to learn from a news broadcast that Nick is not actually a detective and that he lied about booking the trip in advance, and she leaves with Cavendish.

All of them go to Lake Como, where Nick and Audrey realize Cavendish and Suzi are still in love and perhaps the murderers planning to split the inheritance. The couple are forced to flee from a hidden gunman and run into Carlos. They soon are confronted by Suzi, who is killed by a masked person with a blow dart. Nick and Carlos try to chase the killer, but they fail. Nick and Audrey go to Quince's mansion to confront Cavendish, but find him dead by poison.

The couple summons Delacroix and the remaining guests, who all have alibis. Nick and Audrey deduce that Grace is the murderer; she convinced Tobey to kill his father, before killing him and has been picking off the other heirs. Grace reveals that she is actually Quince and the Colonel's wife's child, but due to Quince's sexism, he disowned her and pretended that she is dead. She states that his money truly belongs to her and is shot by Nick in the arm while trying to escape.

While celebrating, Nick and Audrey realize Grace's alibi still stands after Vikram points out that he and Grace were having drinks during the time Sergei was killed, so there must be another conspirator who could have killed Sergei. They deduce that Carlos is the second murderer, who was avenging his father who had lost both of his legs because of Quince. Holding Delacroix hostage, Carlos leads Nick and Audrey in a car chase, but they force Carlos to crash and rescue Delacroix. Carlos holds them all at gunpoint, but is run over by Nick and Audrey's chaotic tour bus that they never boarded.

Delacroix thanks the couple and offers to help get Nick promoted to detective back home. Nick and Audrey continue their vacation aboard the fabled Orient Express courtesy of Interpol.

== Cast ==
- Adam Sandler as Nick Spitz, a New York City police officer and Audrey's husband
- Jennifer Aniston as Audrey Spitz, a hairdresser, murder mystery novel enthusiast and Nick's wife
- Luke Evans as Charles Cavendish, an aristocrat
- Terence Stamp as Malcolm Quince, an elderly billionaire and Charles' uncle
- Gemma Arterton as Grace Ballard, an actress
- David Walliams as Tobey Quince, Malcolm's only son
- Dany Boon as Inspector Laurent Delacroix, the investigating officer
- John Kani as Colonel Charles Ulenga, a former bodyguard of Malcolm
- Adeel Akhtar as Vikram Shivan Govindan, the Maharajah of Mumbai
- Ólafur Darri Ólafsson as Sergei Radienko, a bodyguard to Malcolm and the Colonel
- Luis Gerardo Méndez as Juan Carlos Rivera, a Formula One driver
- Shioli Kutsuna as Suzi Nakamura, Malcolm's fiancée and Charles' ex
- Erik Griffin as Jimmy Stern, a colleague of Nick's
- Sufe Bradshaw as Holly
- Allen Covert as a tourist dad
- Nicole Randall Johnson as Marisol
- Andrea Bendewald as client number 2

== Production ==
In June 2012, it was reported that Charlize Theron had signed on to star in Murder Mystery, a mystery-comedy then set to be directed by John Madden, from James Vanderbilt's screenplay. Before the announcement, the project had been set up at Walt Disney Studios with Kevin McDonald set to direct. In April 2013, it was reported that Colin Firth, Adam Sandler and Emily Blunt had joined the cast - although, representatives for Firth and Blunt denied that they were boarding the film. In September 2013, it was reported that both Theron and Madden had left the project and that Anne Fletcher was now set to direct for TWC-Dimension; Theron eventually received an executive producer credit on the film, along with her studio, Denver and Delilah Productions, listed in the film.

In March 2018, it was announced that Sandler and Jennifer Aniston had signed to star, reuniting them after Just Go with It, their 2011 film. Kyle Newacheck directed, still with Vanderbilt's script, and the film premiered on Netflix as part of Sandler's distribution deal. In June 2018, it was announced that Luke Evans, Gemma Arterton, David Walliams, Erik Griffin, John Kani, Shioli Kutsuna, Luis Gerardo Méndez, Adeel Akhtar, Ólafur Darri Ólafsson, Dany Boon and Terence Stamp had joined the cast.

Principal photography on the film began on June 14, 2018, in Montréal. In late July 2018, filming began in Italy at locations including Santa Margherita Ligure, Lake Como, and Milan (where most of the scenes set in Monaco were actually shot) also using vehicles and uniforms of the Carabinieri.

== Release ==
Murder Mystery was released on Netflix on June 14, 2019.

On June 18, 2019, Netflix reported that 30.9 million households watched the film in the first 72 hours, the biggest opening weekend for a film in the company's history. In July 2019, Netflix reported that the film was viewed by 73 million households in its first four weeks of release, based on a viewing metric of at least 70% of the film watched, making it Sandler's most successful film on the streaming platform. Viewership numbers were adjusted up to 83 million accounts worldwide based on Netflix's new metric of at least 2 minutes of the film watched, making it the fifth most-watched original film on Netflix. Updated hourly figures state the movie was watched for 169.59 million hours in the first 28 days of release.

== Reception ==
=== Critical response ===
On the website Rotten Tomatoes, the film holds an approval rating of 43% based on 69 reviews, with an average rating of 4.7/10. The website's critics consensus reads, "Murder Mystery reunites Jennifer Aniston and Adam Sandler for a lightweight comedy that's content to settle for merely mediocre." Metacritic assigned the film a weighted average score of 38 out of 100, based on 19 critics, indicating "generally unfavorable" reviews.

Amy Nicholson of Variety wrote, "Murder Mystery feels as shamelessly gaudy as paste jewelry — a trinket for nights that aspire to nothing more exotic than a pizza — but Aniston sparkles like the real deal." John DeFore of The Hollywood Reporter called it "A tale as generic, and as dull, as its title."

=== Accolades ===
Association	Year	Category	Recipient	Results	Ref.
People's Choice Awards	2019	Favorite Comedic Movie	Murder Mystery	Won	
People's Choice Awards	2019	Favorite Male Movie Star	Adam Sandler	Nominated	
People's Choice Awards	2019	Favorite Female Movie Star	Jennifer Aniston	Nominated	
People's Choice Awards	2019	Favorite Comedy Movie Star	Adam Sandler	Nominated	
Teen Choice Awards	2019	Choice Summer Movie	Murder Mystery	Nominated	
Teen Choice Awards	2019	Choice Summer Movie Actor	Adam Sandler	Nominated	
Teen Choice Awards	2019	Choice Summer Movie Actress	Jennifer Aniston	Nominated	
