= Killing Katie =

Studio album by Link 80
- Released: August 27, 1997
- Recorded: April 1997 at Fantasy Studios, Berkeley, California.
- Genre: Punk rock, ska punk, hardcore punk
- Label: Asian Man
- Producer: Link 80, Steve Fontano

Link 80 chronology
17 Reasons (1997)	Killing Katie (1997)	The Struggle Continues (2000)

Killing Katie is the second album by the punk band Link 80. It was released on CD and 10" vinyl by Asian Man Records in 1997.

It was recorded with Steve Fontano at Fantasy Studios in Berkeley, California between 18–20 April 1997. The album was the last Link 80 recording to feature lead singer Nick Traina and guitarist Matt Bettinelli-Olpin.

It was released less than a month before Nick Traina's suicide.

== Track listing ==
1. "Better Than Shit"
2. "Packing Up"
3. "No Such Thing"
4. "Kind Of..."
5. "The Truth Of It"
6. "El Stupido (No Quiero Vomitar)"
7. "Nothing Left"
8. "For What It's Worth" (originally recorded by Buffalo Springfield)
9. "Termination (Live at 924 Gilman Street)"
10. "Blank Mind (Live at 924 Gilman Street)"
11. "Teenage Fuck Up (Live at 924 Gilman Street)"

== Sampled material ==
- "Better Than Shit" samples the opening line from N.W.A.'s "Straight Outta Compton".
- "El Stupido" samples dialogue from American Me.
- "For What It's Worth" uses a quote from Christopher McDonald as Shooter McGavin in Happy Gilmore.
- The album cover features an altered still image from the 1943 film I Walked with a Zombie.

== Band manifesto ==
Reacting to turmoil in the Bay Area music scene, the band wrote a call to action that was included in the album's lyric sheet: "We are the new school, its up to us to change the way things are, to make things better. Fuck separatism, we have to unite at all costs. Unconditional acceptance of people into our lives and scenes is the only way. Race, age, sex, religion, what you wear, what music you like, who you fuck...none of it matters. The adult society infested with snobbery and violence should bear no reflection on our underground. Instead of turning our backs to the new kids wanting to learn about our scenes, we should teach them how it should be. Nobody was born cool and nobody is better than the rest. We can do it, all we have to do is try...otherwise the cycle will continue and we too will get caught in it, just like so many of those who came before us. There are too many boundaries, too many walls, too many locked hearts, and too many closed minds. It's up to us to cross the boundaries, to break the walls, to unlock the hearts, and to open the minds."

== Personnel ==
- Nick Traina – lead vocals
- Matt Bettinelli-Olpin – guitar, vocals (bridge vocals on "Better Than Shit")
- Adam Pereira – bass, vocals (outro vocals on "Packing Up")
- Aaron Nagel – trumpet
- Joey Bustos – drums
- Seth Blankenship – saxophone
- Jason Lechner – saxophone
- Matthew "Kramer" Croda – trumpet
