= Tripp Vinson =

American film and television producer

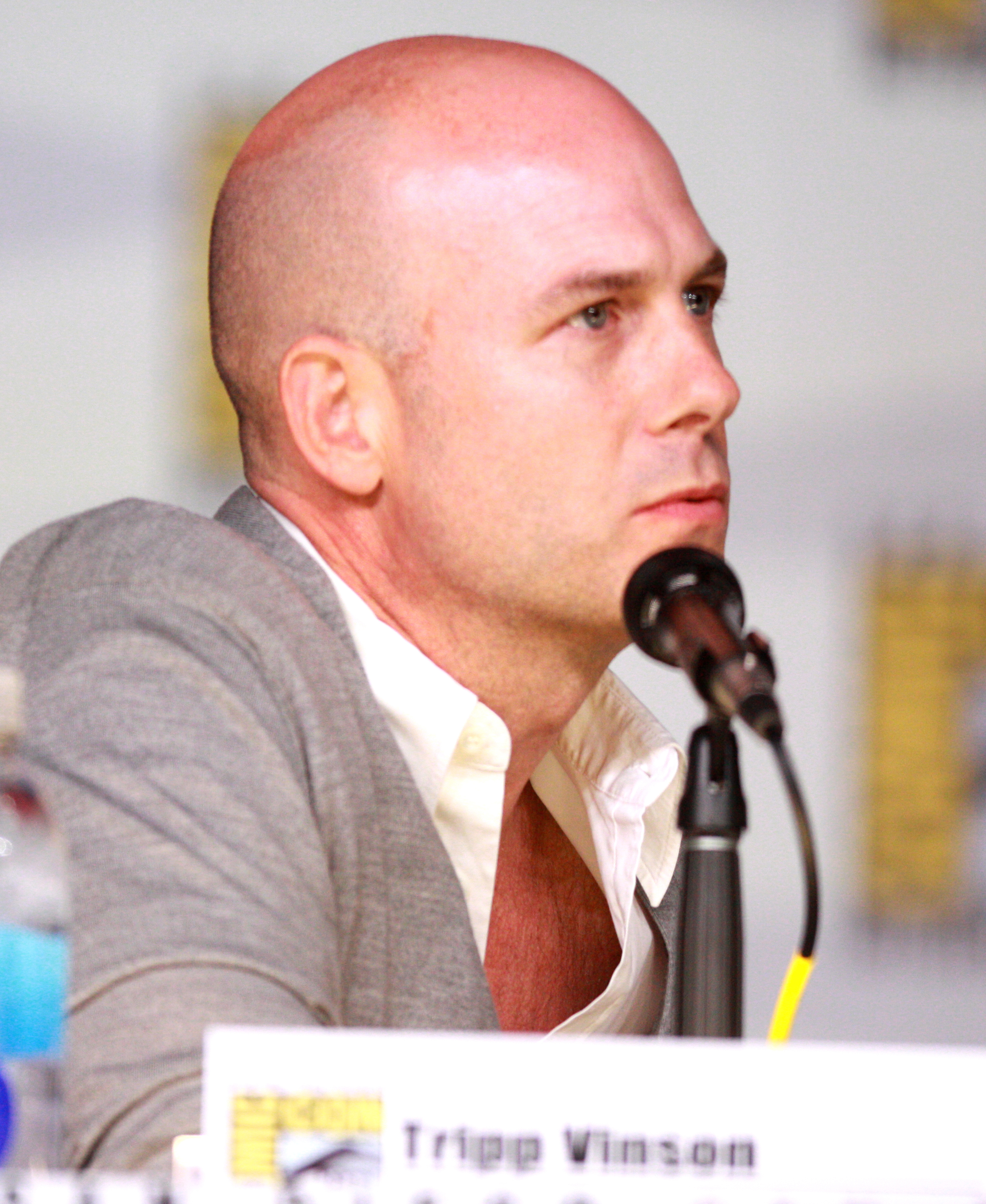
- Vinson in July 2013
- Occupation: Film producer
- Spouse: Adriana Alberghetti

Tripp Vinson is an American film producer. He is best known for producing the films Baywatch, San Andreas, Journey 2: The Mysterious Island, The Guardian, The Number 23, Red Dawn, and Hansel & Gretel: Witch Hunters.

Vinson has been described by The New York Times as a "journeyman producer who specializes in popcorn flicks" and is good at getting films produced while quickly adapting to shifting trends. His films have collectively grossed over $1.5 billion at the box office.

== Career ==
Vinson was the producing partner of Beau Flynn until they split in June 2011 after a decade of working together.

In 2012, it was announced that a film called Cryptozoologists was in the works at New Line Cinema with Vinson and Beau Flynn producing the film. The film was based on David Gilcreast's spec script with the same name and it was also announced that Greg Erb and Jason Oremland will be rewriting the script.

In 2015, it was announced that Vinson was producing a live-action prequel to Aladdin, titled Genies.

In 2016, it was announced that Vinson was set to produce a spin-off of Snow White and the Seven Dwarfs titled Rose Red.

== Personal life ==
Vinson is married to Adriana Alberghetti, a talent agent for WME. His bachelor party in Las Vegas was revealed to have indirectly been the basis for the plot of the comedy film The Hangover. In 2022, the couple purchased a home in the Studio City neighborhood of Los Angeles for $5 million at an auction.

== Filmography ==
Producer

- After the Sunset (2004)
- The Exorcism of Emily Rose (2005)
- The Guardian (2006)
- The Number 23 (2007)
- Choke (2008)
- The Rite (2011)
- What's Your Number? (2011)
- Journey 2: The Mysterious Island (2012)
- Red Dawn (2012)
- Battle of the Year (2013)
- Solace (2015)
- Eloise (2016)
- The Prodigy (2019)
- Ready or Not (2019)
- Murder Mystery (2019)
- Murder Mystery 2 (2023)
- Abigail (2024)
- Fountain of Youth (2025)
- Ready or Not 2: Here I Come (2026)

Executive producer

- 11:14 (2003)
- Journey to the Center of the Earth (2008)
- Hansel & Gretel: Witch Hunters (2013)
- Intelligence (2014) (TV series)
- San Andreas (2015)
