= 17 Reasons =

Studio album by Link 80
- Released: 1997
- Recorded: 1996
- Studio: Art of Ears, Hayward, California; Fantasy Studios, Berkeley, California
- Genre: punk rock, ska punk, hardcore punk
- Label: Asian Man Records
- Producer: Link 80, Andy Ernst

Link 80 chronology
| Rumble at the Tracks (1996) | 17 Reasons (1997) | Killing Katie (1997) |

Professional ratings
Review scores
| Source | Rating |
|---|---|
| Punknews.org | 5/5 stars |

17 Reasons is the first full-length album by the ska punk band Link 80. It was recorded in 1996 and released on CD and 12" vinyl by Asian Man Records in 1997. The record was the first original release for Asian Man Records (the previous four releases had initially been released on Dill Records).

It was recorded during two sessions: one at Fantasy Studios in Berkeley, CA with Steve Fontano and one at Art of Ears with Andy Ernst. The album title and a song title ("Turn It Around") come from two of the band's favorite local Bay Area punk rock compilations: Turn It Around! and 17 Reasons: The Mission District. The cover photo was taken March 17, 1996 at Ann Kong's Bleach Bottle Pig Farm in Berkeley, California, located at 2072 San Pablo Ave.

On October 17, 2023, Mike Park announced that Asian Man Records would reissue 17 Reasons and The Struggle Continues on vinyl, as well as reprinting the band's first official shirt. The reissue includes new vinyl mastering and a new insert to replicate the original 1997 pressing.

== Track listing ==
1. "Verbal Kint"
2. "Nothing Left"
3. "Enough"
4. "Pretty Girls"
5. "Jeff Acree"
6. "Screwed"
7. "Termination"
8. "Turn It Around"
9. "What Can I Do?"
10. "Up To The Top"
11. "Dimestore Hoods"
12. "Slap"
13. "Dance Floor"
14. "Looking Back"
15. "Nowhere Fast"
16. "Jenifer's Cafe"
17. "Burning Down"
18. "Who Killed Marilyn? (Hidden Track)" This track starts exactly 8 minutes after the end of Burning Down.

"Those Days" is included instead of "Jenifer's Cafe" on all 12" releases.

== Sampled material ==
- "Burning Down" samples Pretty in Pink at the song's end.
- The sample before "What Can I Do?" is New Kids on the Block.
- The bridge during "Dime Store Hoods" is partially from an Earth Crisis song.
- "Jeff Acree" is cover of "Teenage Fuckup" by Ratt Patrol (originally released on the Cometbus compilation, "Lest We Forget").

== Music videos ==
The band shot their only official music video for "Verbal Kint" (a song is about the character in The Usual Suspects). Directed by Scott Pourroy, the video was shot at two consecutive Link 80 shows; January 17, 1997 at 924 Gilman Street and January 18th, 1997 at the Arcata Community Center. Filming at the Gilman Street Project resulted in the band being temporarily banned from performing at the establishment and they didn't play there again until June 6, 1997; it would be the last time they ever played at the Gilman Street Project with Nick Traina as lead vocalist.

== Reception ==
Maximumrocknroll gave the album a great review stating that "after a couple of splits, finally a full length from these teenage Gilman faves. These youngsters, the oldest is only 18, obviously listened to Operation Ivy because they have a similar heavy ska punk sound. Yet, unlike lots of skacore stuff, Link 80 have enough energy and edge to pull it off. Congratulations."

Aaron Carnes of BrooklynVegan praised the album citing "their incredible horn section and Bustos’ crazy good drumming" and goes on to describe their place in the 90s ska scene. Conversely, AllMusic's Ari Wiznitzer panned the album, stating that Link 80 mimicked other bands but with considerably less talent. Wrote the fanzine Teenage Warning, Link 80 played with higher speed and less melody than other contemporary ska punk bands. "It doesn't suck but you'll have to get accustomed to their whirlwind approach". The same was noted by the German zine Skin Up, whose review underlined the "hectic" mood, the "turbo guitars", the "Oi! compatible choruses" and the "unfortunately too thin horns".

== Personnel ==
- Nick Traina – lead vocals
- Matt Bettinelli-Olpin – guitar, vocals (lead vocals on "Turn It Around")
- Adam Pereira – bass, vocals (lead vocals on "Slap" and "Termination")
- Aaron Nagel – trumpet, organ
- Joey Bustos – drums
- Brian Beggs – trombone
- Paul McCarthy – saxophone
