= Ready or Not 2: Here I Come =

2026 film by Matt Bettinelli-Olpin and Tyler Gillett

- Theatrical release poster
- Directed by: Matt Bettinelli-Olpin; Tyler Gillett
- Written by: Guy Busick; R. Christopher Murphy
- Based on: Characters by Guy Busick & R. Christopher Murphy
- Produced by: Tripp Vinson; James Vanderbilt; William Sherak; Bradley J. Fischer
- Starring: Samara Weaving; Kathryn Newton; Sarah Michelle Gellar; Shawn Hatosy; David Cronenberg; Elijah Wood
- Cinematography: Brett Jutkiewicz
- Edited by: Jay Prychidny
- Music by: Sven Faulconer (Note: Original themes by Brian Tyler.)
- Production companies: Vinson Films; Mythology Entertainment; Radio Silence
- Distributed by: Searchlight Pictures
- Release dates: March 13, 2026 (SXSW); March 20, 2026 (United States)
- Running time: 108 minutes
- Country: United States
- Language: English
- Budget: $14 million
- Box office: $43 million

Ready or Not 2: Here I Come (titled on-screen as Ready or Not: Here I Come) is a 2026 American comedy horror film directed by Matt Bettinelli-Olpin and Tyler Gillett, and written by Guy Busick and R. Christopher Murphy. It serves as a sequel to Ready or Not (2019), with Samara Weaving reprising her role as Grace MacCaullay. The film also stars Kathryn Newton, Sarah Michelle Gellar, Shawn Hatosy, David Cronenberg, and Elijah Wood. Set immediately after the events of Ready or Not, it follows Grace (Weaving) as she must protect her estranged sister (Newton) while being hunted by four elite families in a high-stakes ritual to claim a seat of ultimate power.

Ready or Not 2: Here I Come premiered at the South by Southwest Film & TV Festival on March 13, 2026, and was released theatrically in the United States by Searchlight Pictures on March 20. The film received generally positive reviews from critics and became a moderate success after grossing $43 million against a $14 million budget.

== Plot ==
After surviving the Le Domases' attempted sacrificial ritual, (Note: As depicted in Ready or Not (2019)) Grace MacCaullay collapses outside the property and is taken to a hospital. She reunites with her younger sister Faith, whom she has been estranged from since college.

Meanwhile, the Council—led by the twins Ursula and Titus Danforth, Wan Chen Xing, Viraj Rajan, Ignacio El Caido, and Bill Wilkinson—is notified of the Le Domas' deaths and prepares to meet at the Danforth complex for another game. At his request, Ursula and Titus kill their father who is the Council's leader, Chester, so that they can take his place in the game. Bill attempts to kill Grace at the hospital, but explodes due to failing to wait for the game's official commencement. Grace and Faith are knocked out and taken to Danforth. They awaken to Le Bail's representative, the "Lawyer", explaining that whichever Council family kills Grace before dawn will acquire the High Seat, alongside a ring granting them infinite worldwide power. Grace refuses to participate, but agrees when Faith's life is put at stake. The eldest members sign a blood oath, commencing the game.

Grace and Faith are handcuffed together and begin on a golf course. After evading attempts from different families, the sisters manage to kill Viraj. Chen Xing reveals to them that if Grace marries one of the Council's family members, the game immediately ends, granting her spouse the High Seat and sparing their lives. Grace refuses to do so, and they are interrupted by Ignacio, who is unintentionally killed by Chen Xing. The Wans explode into blood as Ignacio's daughter and Alex Le Domas' ex-fiancée Francesca prepares to enter the game. Faith criticizes Grace's refusal of the opportunity.

Viraj's death allows his brother Madhu to enter the game, but he forfeits head status to his wife Martina. Instead of playing, she drives off from the hunt and destroys the gate in the process. Ursula nearly kills Grace, but Faith saves her and the sisters flee. Grace lambasts Faith's return and wishes they had never reunited, leading a heartbroken Faith to leave. Titus attacks Faith and kidnaps her while Francesca targets Grace, though the latter eventually acquires a shotgun and kills her. Through an intercom, Titus taunts Grace and forces her to the main lounge where Faith is held captive.

Grace storms into the lounge but is cornered by the surviving players. Using Chen Xing's loophole, Grace agrees to marry Titus to ensure her and Faith's safety, handing over the High Seat to the Danforths and concluding the game despite Faith begging her not to. Before the wedding, Ursula privately warns Grace about Titus' psychopathy and her fears of what could transpire under his order. Ursula suggests that she and Grace work together to control Titus after the marriage. Titus, having overheard, kills Ursula, as there is no rule against killing family members. At an underground altar, the marriage ensues before a crowd of Satanic cult members.

After they sign their intertwined familial blood pacts, Grace stabs Titus in the neck with a fountain pen, snatches his ring while throwing his "no rule against killing family members" statement back at him, and Faith kicks him into an open circular pit full of sacrificed goats where he is impaled by a goat horn, killing him. Now holding ownership of the High Seat, Grace announces her removal from the organization and throws the ring into the pit. Since the High Seat now belongs to whoever is wearing the ring at dawn, the wedding guests all jump into the pit for a chance at acquisition, murdering each other as they do so. No one succeeds before dawn and the entire Council, excluding the Lawyer, erupts into a torrential blood explosion within the pit. Madhu, who had hidden and believes he has survived because he gave up his seat, explodes while rejoicing.

Le Bail's spirit briefly appears and nods to both Grace and Faith as they are finally free. The sisters leave the premises alongside the Council's sacrificial goat they freed, and Grace promises never to leave Faith again.

== Cast ==
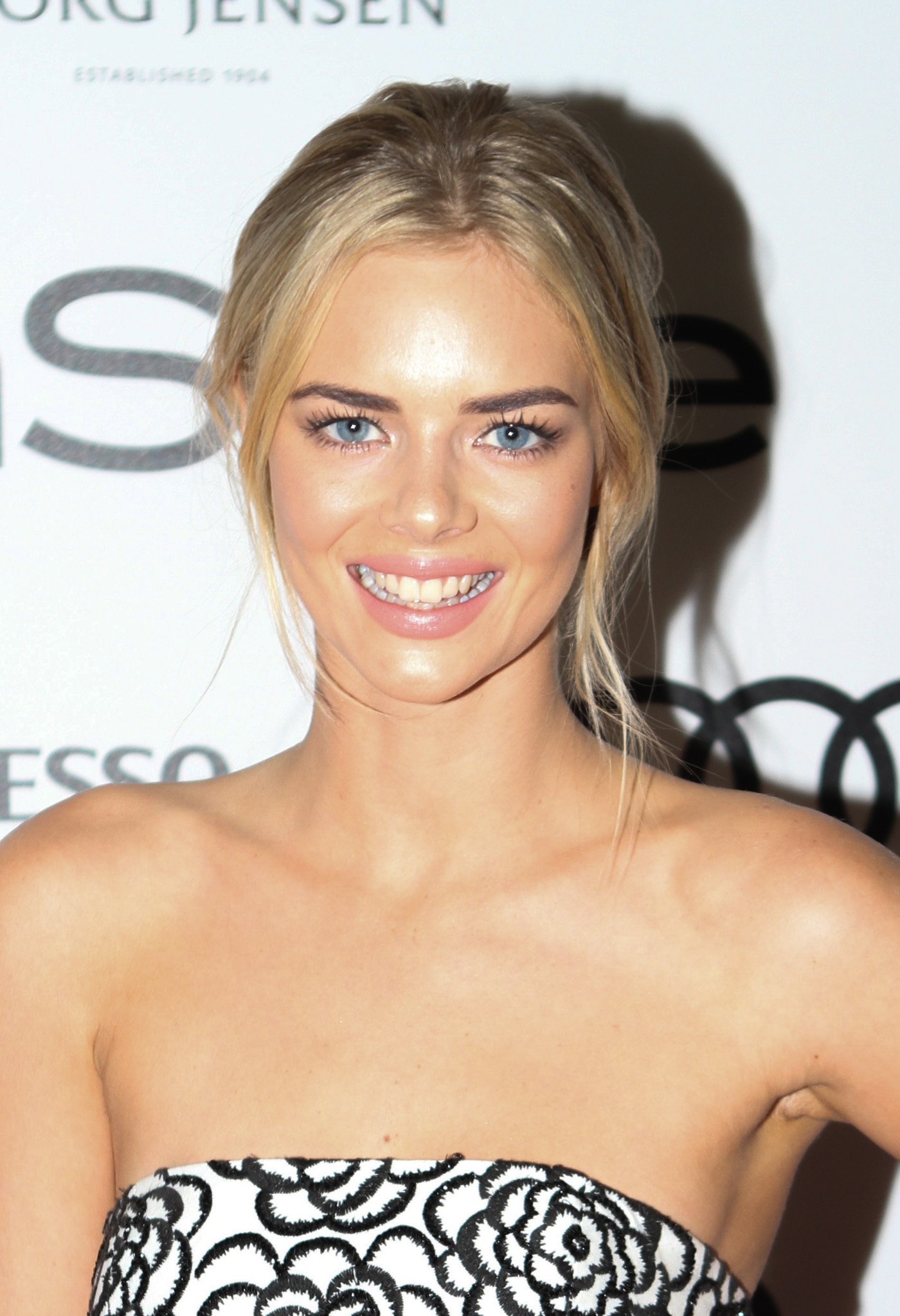
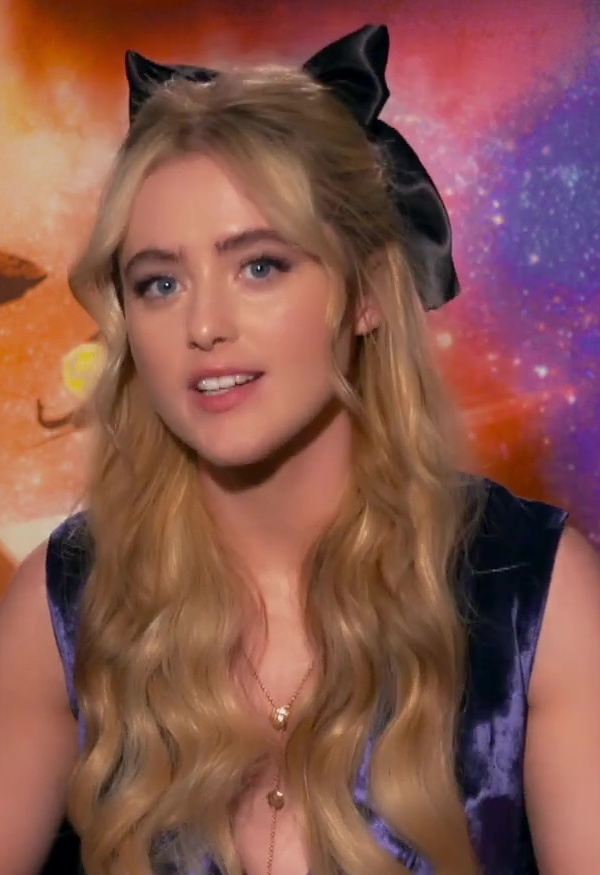
L–R: Samara Weaving reprises her role as Grace, while Kathryn Newton plays Grace's sister Faith.
- Samara Weaving as Grace MacCaullay, the former daughter-in-law of the Le Domas family and the winner of hide-and-seek game
- Kathryn Newton as Faith MacCaullay, Grace's estranged younger sister who she abandoned when Faith was 15
- Sarah Michelle Gellar as Ursula Danforth, the eldest daughter of the Danforth family
- Shawn Hatosy as Titus Danforth, Ursula's fraternal twin brother
- David Cronenberg as Chester Danforth, the head of the Danforth family
- Elijah Wood as the "Lawyer", a representative of Le Bail
- Néstor Carbonell as Ignacio El Caido, the head of the El Caido family
- Kevin Durand as Bill Wilkinson, the head of the Wilkinson family
- Olivia Cheng as Wan Chen Xing, the head of the Wan family
- Nadeem Umar-Khitab as Viraj Rajan, the head of the Rajan family
- Varun Saranga as Madhu Rajan, Viraj's brother
- Juan Pablo Romero as Felipe El Caido, Ignacio's son
- Masa Lizdek as Martina Rajan, Madhu's wife
- Maia Jae as Francesca El Caido, Ignacio's daughter and Alex Le Domas' ex-fiancée
- Dan Beirne as Kip Danforth, Ursula and Titus' cousin
- Antony Hall as Wan Cheng Fu, Chen Xing's son
- James Vanderbilt as Mr. "Le Bail" (uncredited)

== Production ==
Matt Bettinelli-Olpin and Tyler Gillett were developing an original film about sisters for Kathryn Newton and Samara Weaving to star in. When Searchlight Pictures asked Bettinelli-Olpin and Gillett to direct the sequel to Ready or Not, they offered to adapt their original sister story into the Ready or Not universe, and Searchlight agreed. Prior to Bettinelli-Olpin & Gillett's return, Adam Robitel and Timo Tjahjanto had been in talks to direct a possible sequel. On October 12, 2024, at a special screening of Ready or Not, Searchlight officially announced a sequel with Radio Silence Productions. Weaving reprised her role from the original film. Also returning were writers Guy Busick and R. Christopher Murphy and the original producing team. Newton's role was announced in March 2025.

Principal photography began in Toronto on April 21, 2025, with the cast including Sarah Michelle Gellar, Elijah Wood, Kevin Durand, David Cronenberg, Shawn Hatosy, Néstor Carbonell, and Olivia Cheng. Filming concluded by June 2, 2025. Sven Faulconer, who previously worked with the directors on Scream VI, composed the film's score, released by Hollywood Records on March 18, 2026. Brian Tyler, the composer of the 2019 film, returned to provide the sequel's original themes and served as the project's score producer. Faulconer's approach for the sequel utilized a "baroque-meets-slaughter" style, incorporating the viola da gamba to reflect the expanded, wealthy mythology of the High Council. The score features a central cello motif representing the "satanic theme" alongside emotional themes for the main characters. The soundtrack includes a cover of The Shirelles's "Will You Love Me Tomorrow" produced by Suzy Chinn and performed by Brian Fallon and Madi Diaz. Ice Nine Kills made the track "Hell or High Slaughter", performing as the fictional 1980s band Grave Diggler, although the track is not featured in the soundtrack.

== Release ==
Ready or Not 2: Here I Come premiered at the South by Southwest Film & TV Festival on March 13, 2026, and was released on March 20, 2026. It was originally scheduled for April 10, 2026, and March 27, 2026. The film was released on VOD on May 5, 2026, and on DVD and Blu-ray on June 16, 2026. On streaming, the film debuted at number one on both iTunes and Amazon in the US, UK, and various other countries.

== Reception ==
=== Box office ===
Ready or Not 2: Here I Come grossed $23 million in the United States and Canada, and $20 million in other territories, for a worldwide total of $43 million.

In the United States and Canada, Ready or Not 2: Here I Come was released alongside Project Hail Mary and The Pout-Pout Fish, and was projected to gross around $11 million in its opening weekend. The film earned $1.2 million from Thursday night previews. It went on to debut to $9.1 million, finishing in fourth. In its second weekend, the film dropped 56%, earning $4 million.

The film's underperformance on the opening weekend caused Deadline's Anthony D'Alessandro to write, "Frankly, I'm shocked. For all that is hip in Ready or Not 2's casting with Sarah Michelle Gellar, Elijah Wood and Kathryn Newton, the Buffy headlines, the cult appeal of Radio Silence, and the SXSW world premiere of it all, you'd think that Ready or Not 2 would break out and become a spring event movie. It could be as simple as the sequel's core 18–34 audience are buying tickets to Project Hail Mary first."

=== Critical response ===
Metacritic review
breakdown (unweighted)

Positive
15 (44%)
Mixed
17 (50%)
Negative
2 (6%)

On the review aggregator website Rotten Tomatoes, 75% of 227 critics' reviews are positive, with an average rating of 6.4/10. The website's consensus reads: "Tempting fate by picking up where it left off after an extended absence, Ready or Not 2 cheats the sequel curse thanks in large part to Samara Weaving's ferocious commitment to the bloody bit." Metacritic, which uses a weighted average, assigned the film a score of 58 out of 100, based on 34 critics, indicating "mixed or average" reviews. Audiences polled by CinemaScore gave the film an average grade of "B+" on an A+ to F scale.

Deadline's Glenn Garner called the film "a bloody good time", and wrote, "This action-packed, blood-soaked sequel is just what fans have been waiting for the past seven years, hopefully paving the way for a trilogy in this sinister world Radio Silence has created." Meagan Navarro of Bloody Disgusting gave the film a 3 and a half stars out of 5, and wrote, "More is more in Ready or Not 2. Bigger stakes, larger playing field, a higher (and more gruesome) body count, and even double the protagonists. All designed to deliver maximum crowd-pleasing fun. It more than delivers on that front, even if it loses some of the original magic in the process." BJ Colangelo of /Film wrote, "Ready Or Not 2 goes double or nothing and plays for keeps. Either you get on board with the way the world is changing, or you die. It's really that simple." Brian Tallerico of RogerEbert.com gave the film 3 out of 4 stars and wrote, "In a year when news stories have proliferated about the unchecked evil at the core of so many business and seats of power around the world, there's something almost comforting about watching an ordinary woman and her sister fight the system right down to the bowels of Hell. We could all use a few more fighters like Grace."

Variety's Owen Gleiberman gave a more mixed review, saying that the film will satisfy the fans of the first film, while further stating, "If there's ever a Ready or Not 3 it would be good to see the elites in it do something that's as interesting as it is brutal."
