= Ready or Not (2019 film) =

Film by Matt Bettinelli-Olpin and Tyler Gillett

- Theatrical release poster
- Directed by: Matt Bettinelli-Olpin; Tyler Gillett
- Written by: Guy Busick; R. Christopher Murphy
- Produced by: Tripp Vinson; James Vanderbilt; William Sherak; Bradley J. Fischer
- Starring: Samara Weaving; Adam Brody; Mark O'Brien; Elyse Levesque; Nicky Guadagni; Henry Czerny; Andie MacDowell
- Cinematography: Brett Jutkiewicz
- Edited by: Terel Gibson
- Music by: Brian Tyler
- Production companies: Mythology Entertainment; Vinson Films; Radio Silence Productions
- Distributed by: Fox Searchlight Pictures
- Release dates: July 27, 2019 (Fantasia); August 21, 2019 (United States)
- Running time: 95 minutes
- Country: United States
- Language: English
- Budget: $6 million
- Box office: $57.6 million

Ready or Not is a 2019 American comedy horror film directed by Matt Bettinelli-Olpin and Tyler Gillett, and written by Guy Busick and R. Christopher Murphy. It stars Samara Weaving, Adam Brody, Mark O'Brien, Elyse Levesque, Nicky Guadagni, Henry Czerny, and Andie MacDowell. It follows a young bride who is hunted by her spouse's wealthy family as part of a wedding night ritual.

Preparations began in November 2017 when Bettinelli-Olpin and Gillett, members of the filmmaking collective Radio Silence, were hired as directors, with Busick and Murphy attached to write the screenplay. After setting an initial release date, casting occurred from August to October 2018. Principal photography began later that month and concluded in November, in locations in and around Toronto, Canada and the surrounding Ontario area. Brian Tyler was hired to compose and conduct the film's score, marking his first collaboration with Bettinelli-Olpin and Gillett.

Ready or Not premiered at the Fantasia International Film Festival on July 27, 2019, and was theatrically released in the United States on August 21, 2019, by Fox Searchlight Pictures. It received positive reviews from critics and grossed $57.6 million worldwide against a $6 million budget. It was nominated for Best Horror Film at the 46th Saturn Awards. A sequel, Ready or Not 2: Here I Come, was released in 2026.

== Plot ==
As a child, Daniel Le Domas is confronted in his family's mansion by Charles, a wounded man who begs him for help. Instead, Daniel alerts his family, who arrive in ceremonial masks and robes. Despite his bride Helene's pleas, Charles is shot with a speargun and dragged away into a locked room.

Thirty years later, Daniel's brother, Alex, the estranged son of the owners of the successful Le Domas Family Games company, is set to marry Grace MacCaullay, a former foster child. On Alex and Grace's wedding night, she meets the Le Domases: Daniel and his wife Charity; Alex's cocaine-addicted sister Emilie, her husband Fitch, and their young sons Georgie and Gabe; Alex's Aunt Helene, and his parents Tony and Becky. Before the game, Tony explains that his great-grandfather Victor Le Domas made a deal with someone named "Le Bail" to build the Le Domas fortune in exchange for the family observing a tradition: at midnight on their wedding day every new member draws a game card from Le Bail's puzzle box. Grace draws "Hide-and-Seek". Believing it to be a harmless game, Grace hides herself as the Le Domases each receive a weapon. Alex finds Grace, who witnesses Emilie accidentally kill a maid whom she mistakes for Grace.

Alex reveals that his family is cursed: if the new member draws the Hide-and-Seek card, the rest must find and ritually sacrifice them before dawn, or they die instead. The card was last drawn by Helene's husband, Charles, who was then found and murdered. With the mansion locked down, Alex disables the security system to allow Grace to escape. She is discovered by Daniel, who is disillusioned with his family, and gives her a head start before alerting the others; Emilie accidentally kills another maid in the chaos. Grace's escape is blocked by the family butler Stevens. She, in turn, splatters boiling tea onto his face and runs away. Daniel and Tony restrain Alex after he attacks the latter. Grace is seen by a third maid who accidentally crushes herself in a dumbwaiter while alerting the family to Grace's presence.

Grace runs to the goat shed, where Georgie shoots her in the hand. She knocks him out but is startled by a goat and falls into a pit filled with the remains of the Le Domases' previous sacrifices, including that of Charles. She escapes, makes it through the front gate, but is captured by Stevens. As he is driving her back to the house, she awakens and attacks him, causing the car to crash and kill him. Near the crash, Daniel detains Grace after realizing that his father is watching.

The Le Domases prepare to complete the ritual sacrifice. However, they are incapacitated as Daniel had poisoned them with a non-lethal dose of hydrochloric acid in the ritual cup. Charity shoots Daniel in the neck, leaving him to bleed to death as Grace runs away. In the ongoing chaos, the mansion is set ablaze, and Grace is attacked by Charity, who she knocks out with her empty gun.

Alex escapes his restraints to find Grace killed his mother Becky with Le Bail's box. Grace pulls away from Alex, who, realizing that she will never trust him and will leave him once she escapes, subdues her to complete the ritual. Grace breaks free just as the sun rises. At first, nothing happens, convincing the family that Le Bail is nothing but a myth. However, Helene still decides to kill Grace, believing it will please Le Bail. But as soon as Helene attempts to kill her with an axe, she explodes into pieces, revealing the curse to actually be true. The remaining members of the family explode one by one, leaving only Alex, who tries to convince Grace to forgive him. She refuses and tosses her ring back, declaring she wants a divorce; Alex then succumbs to the curse and explodes. Le Bail briefly shows himself to Grace and nods at her.

The sole survivor of the night, a blood-covered Grace, walks out of the burning manor just as the police arrive. She sits down in front of the burning building for a smoke; when asked what has happened to her, she simply replies, "In-laws."

== Cast ==
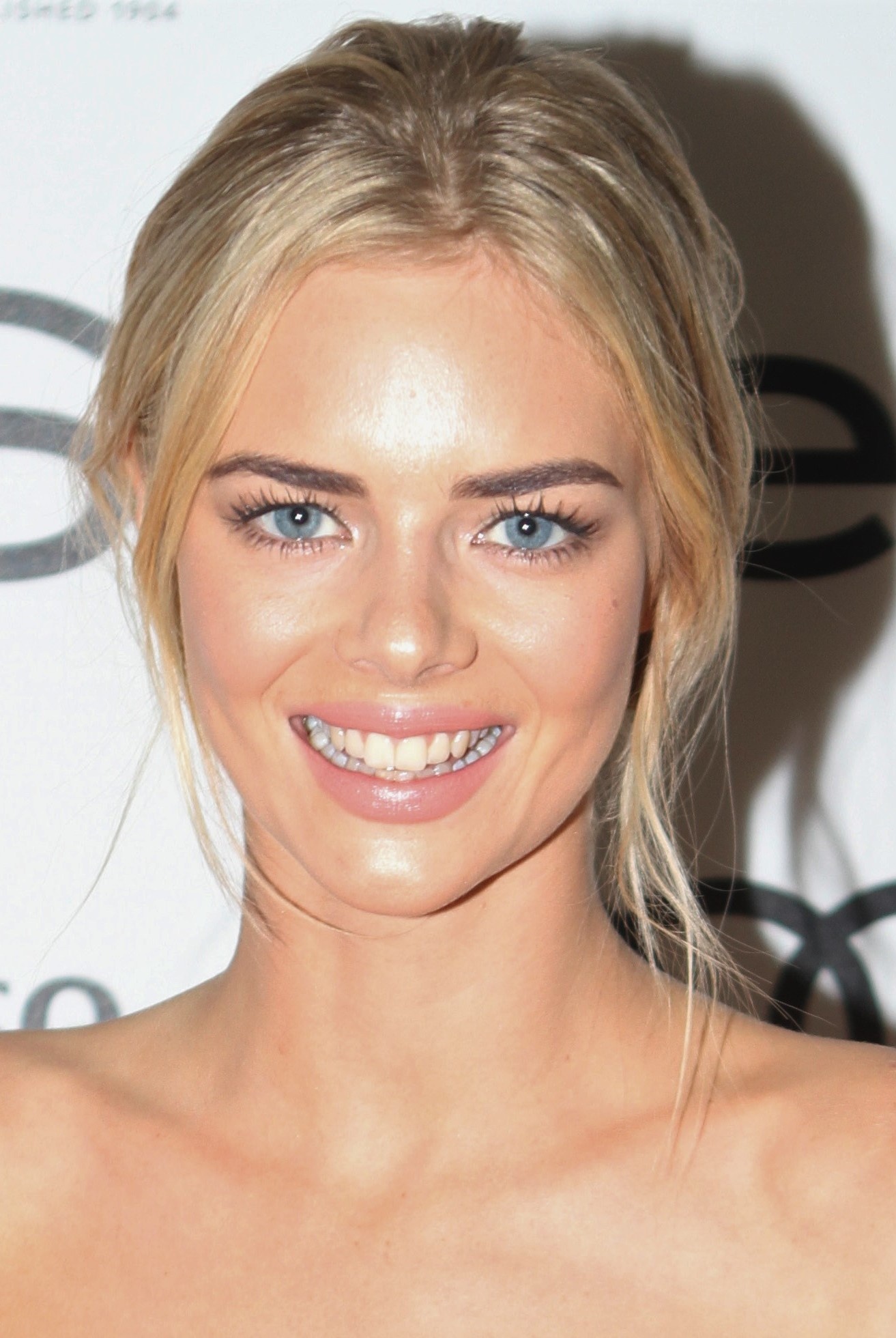
Samara Weaving stars as the lead character Grace

- Samara Weaving as Grace
- Adam Brody as Daniel
- Mark O'Brien as Alex
- Henry Czerny as Tony
- Andie MacDowell as Becky
- Melanie Scrofano as Emilie
- Kristian Bruun as Fitch
- Elyse Levesque as Charity
- Nicky Guadagni as Aunt Helene
- John Ralston as Stevens
- Liam McDonald as Georgie
- Ethan Tavares as Gabe
- Hanneke Talbot as Clara
- Celine Tsai as Tina
- Daniela Barbosa as Dora
- Chase Churchill as young Alex
- Etienne Kellici as young Daniel
- Andrew Anthony as Charles
- Elana Dunkelman as young Helene
- Kate Ziegler as young Becky
- James Eddy as Masked Family Member #1
- Adam Winlove-Smith as Masked Family Member #2
- Alicia Richardson as Police Officer
- Nat Faxon as Justin
- James Vanderbilt as Mr. "Le Bail" (uncredited)

== Production ==
=== Development ===
In November 2017, it was announced that Matt Bettinelli-Olpin and Tyler Gillett would direct the film, from a screenplay by Guy Busick and R. Christopher Murphy. Ready or Not was produced by Tripp Vinson, James Vanderbilt, William Sherak and Bradley J. Fischer. Tara Farney, Tracey Nyberg and Chad Villella executive-produced, under their Mythology Entertainment and Vinson Films production banners, respectively. From August to October 2018, Samara Weaving, Andie MacDowell, Adam Brody, Mark O'Brien, Melanie Scrofano, Henry Czerny and Elyse Levesque were cast.

=== Filming ===
Principal photography was from October 15, 2018, to November 19, 2018, at locations in the Toronto area, including Casa Loma, Sunnybrook Park, the Claireville Conservation Area, and the Parkwood Estate in Oshawa, Ontario.

== Release ==
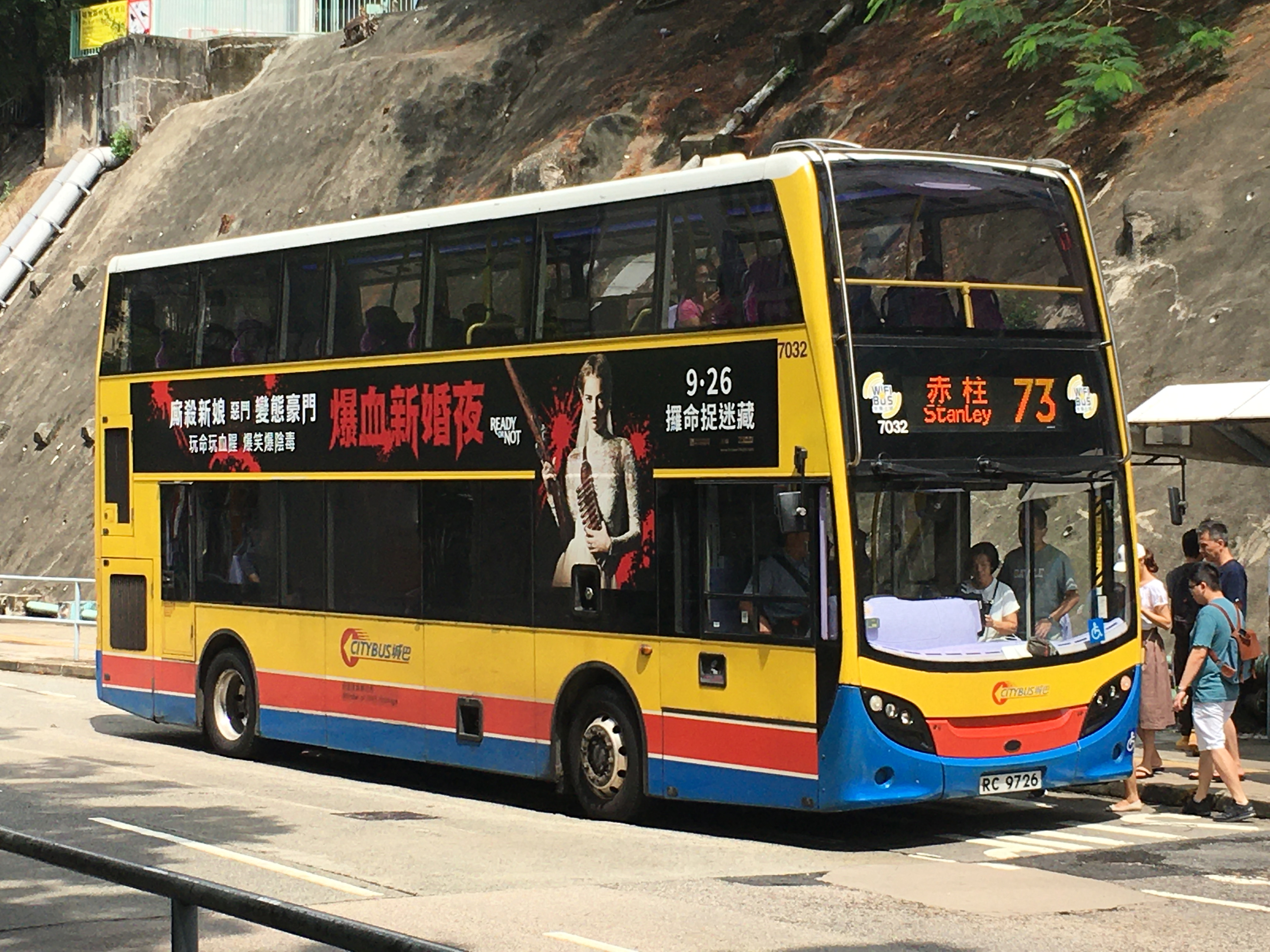
Ready or Not advertisement on the side of a bus in Wah Fu, Hong Kong

The film had its world premiere at the Fantasia International Film Festival on July 27, 2019, and was theatrically released in the United States on August 21, 2019.

=== Home media ===
Ready or Not was released on Digital HD on November 26, 2019, and on DVD and Blu-ray on December 3. The release includes a 42-minute making-of documentary, an audio commentary with star Samara Weaving, directors Matt Bettinelli-Olpin and Tyler Gillett, and executive producer Chad Villella, as well as a photo gallery and a gag reel. The film found new audiences in November 2024 when it was released on the streaming service Netflix where it was on the top ten charts in over 60 countries for weeks. According to viewing data released by Netflix, "during its first week, it gathered 5.3 million views, which roughly translates into 8.6 million hours viewed."

== Reception ==
=== Box office ===
Ready or Not grossed $28.7 million in the United States and Canada, and $28.9 million in other territories, for a worldwide total of $57.6 million

In the United States and Canada, the film was projected to gross around $6.5 million in its opening weekend and $8–12 million over its five-day opening frame. Playing at 2,818 theaters, it was the widest release in Fox Searchlight's history. It made $1.9 million on its first day, Wednesday, including $730,000 from Tuesday night previews, and $1.1 million on its second. The film went on to debut to $8 million during its opening weekend (and $11 million over its first five days), finishing second on its first two days and sixth for the weekend. It fell just 26% in its second weekend to $5.9 million, finishing fifth.

=== Critical response ===
On the review aggregator website Rotten Tomatoes, 89% of 324 critics' reviews are positive, with an average rating of 7.2/10. The website's consensus reads: "Smart, subversive, and darkly funny, Ready or Not is a crowd-pleasing horror film with giddily entertaining bite." Metacritic, which uses a weighted average, assigned the film a score of 64 out of 100, based on 39 critics, indicating "generally favorable" reviews. Audiences polled by CinemaScore gave the film an average grade of "B+" on an A+ to F scale, while those at PostTrak gave it an overall positive score of 71% (including an average 3.5 out of 5 stars) and a 50% "definite recommend".

Peter Debruge wrote in Variety that "This deliciously diabolical sophomore feature, which hails from the resourceful low-budget trio known as Radio Silence, represents a departure for indie distributor Fox Searchlight, which has a real winner on its hands—that rare Get Out–like horror movie capable of delivering superficial diversion alongside deep cultural critique." Peter Travers of Rolling Stone called the film "a decadent blast to watch a comic takedown of the rich done with the rude energy of a horror thriller and the courage of its own manic anti-marriage convictions."

Writing for IndieWire, David Ehrlich describes the film as "wickedly entertaining from start to finish, and painted with enough fresh personality to resolve into something more than the sum of its parts." Leah Greenblatt wrote in Entertainment Weekly, "Come for the crossbows, etc., and to watch Weaving's star be born in real time; stay for the socio-economic lessons and sweet, sweet revenge." David Sims of The Atlantic wrote, "The real fun in Ready or Not comes from the ways it subverts its time-tested story, balancing wry commentary and straightforward horror in its portrait of fumbling arrogance and curdled privilege." Bobby LePire rated the film 10/10 and wrote in Film Threat that "The acting is incredible, the directing striking and intense, and the screenplay is unbelievably brilliant and funny. I adore every scary and funny second of this movie and highly recommend it to everyone else."

=== Accolades ===
Award	Year	Category	Recipient(s)	Result	Ref.
CAFTCAD Awards	2020	Best Costume Design in Film Contemporary	Avery Plewes; Heather Crepp; Joey Watson; Alex Kavanagh	Won	
Clio Entertainment Awards	2019	Theatrical: Trailers	Ready or Not	Won	
Columbus Film Critics Association Awards	2020	Best Overlooked Film	Ready or Not	2nd Place	
Directors Guild of Canada Awards	2020	Outstanding Achievement in Sound Editing – Feature Film	Adam Stein; Joe Bracciale; Kevin Banks; Rose Gregoris	Nominated	
Fangoria Chainsaw Awards	2020	Best Wide Release	Ready or Not	Nominated	
Fangoria Chainsaw Awards	2020	Best Actress	Samara Weaving	Nominated	
Fangoria Chainsaw Awards	2020	Best Screenplay	Guy Busick; R. Christopher Murphy	Nominated	
Fright Meter Awards	2019	Best Horror Movie	Ready or Not	Nominated	
Fright Meter Awards	2019	Best Actress	Samara Weaving	Won	
Fright Meter Awards	2019	Best Supporting Actor	Adam Brody	Nominated	
Fright Meter Awards	2019	Best Supporting Actress	Andie MacDowell	Nominated	
Fright Meter Awards	2019	Best Screenplay	Guy Busick; R. Christopher Murphy	Won	
Fright Meter Awards	2019	Best Score	Brian Tyler	Nominated	
Fright Meter Awards	2019	Best Costume Design	Avery Plewes	Nominated	
Golden Schmoes Awards	2019	Best Horror Movie of the Year	Ready or Not	Nominated	
Golden Schmoes Awards	2019	Biggest Surprise of the Year	Ready or Not	Nominated	
Golden Schmoes Awards	2019	Best T&A of the Year	Samara Weaving	Nominated	
Golden Trailer Awards	2021	Most Original Trailer	Ready or Not	Nominated	
Golden Trailer Awards	2021	Best Horror/Thriller TrailerByte for a Feature Film	Ready or Not	Nominated	
Golden Trailer Awards	2021	Best BTS/EPK for a Feature Film (Under 2 minutes)	Ready or Not	Nominated	
Hollywood Critics Association Awards	2020	Best Horror Film	Ready or Not	Nominated	
Hawaii Film Critics Society Awards	2020	Best Horror Film	Ready or Not	Nominated	
IGN Summer Movie Awards	2019	Best Lead Performer in a Movie	Samara Weaving	Nominated	
IGN Summer Movie Awards	2019	Best Horror Movie	Ready or Not	Nominated	
Music City Film Critics Association Awards	2020	Best Horror Film	Ready or Not	Nominated	
Saturn Awards	2021	Best Horror Film	Ready or Not	Nominated	
St. Louis Gateway Film Critics Association Awards	2019	Best Horror Film	Ready or Not	Nominated	

== Sequel ==
In March 2024, it was reported that a sequel was in development with Adam Robitel in early negotiations to serve as director. By September, Weaving confirmed ongoing discussions for her to reprise the lead role in a sequel. In October, the sequel was officially in development, with Weaving on board to star and Bettinelli-Olpin and Gillett returning to direct. In March 2025, Kathryn Newton joined the cast. In April 2025, the rest of the cast was announced, as was the title: Ready or Not 2: Here I Come. In June 2025, it was announced that the film would be released on April 10, 2026. In December 2025, the film was moved up to March 27, 2026. In January 2026, the film was moved up to March 20, 2026.

== See also ==
- Final girl
