= Aztlan Records =

Independent record label

- Founded: 1986
- Defunct: 2000
- Genre: Indie rock
- Country of origin: United States
- Location: San Francisco, California

Aztlan Records was an independent record label based in San Francisco, California, first established in 1986. The label released music in the genres of Latin indie rock, swing, and ska. It was described as the first label in the country "to devote itself exclusively to U.S.-bred rock en español." The label had a small staff, limited budget, and no mainstream radio support. It serviced the notably small rock en español scene of northern California, which was comparatively smaller than that of southern California.

The first album the label released was Señor Cementerio by Los Angeles-based Ley de Hielo in 1995. It merged out when joining another Latin independent label Grita! Records in 1999. The last album release credited to the record label was Sonero de Cuba by Septeto Nacional de Ignacio Piñeiro. The label was described as defunct in a November 2000 issue of Billboard.

Fernando Ramirez, lead singer of Latin rock band Maria Fatal, recognized the label's importance in the scene, stating "if it weren't for Aztlan Records, I don't know where we'd be." In an article for ColorLines, Hua Hsu noted that "labels like Aztlan, Xicano, Grita!, and Pinche Flojo [fought] to carve out space for Latinos in genres like ska, punk, and indie."
