= Fountain of Youth (film) =

2025 film by Guy Ritchie

- Release poster
- Directed by: Guy Ritchie
- Written by: James Vanderbilt
- Produced by: David Ellison; Dana Goldberg; Don Granger; Guy Ritchie; Ivan Atkinson; Tripp Vinson; Jake Myers; James Vanderbilt; William Sherak; Paul Neinstien
- Starring: John Krasinski; Natalie Portman; Eiza González; Domhnall Gleeson; Arian Moayed; Laz Alonso; Carmen Ejogo; Stanley Tucci
- Cinematography: Ed Wild
- Edited by: James Herbert
- Music by: Christopher Benstead
- Production companies: Apple Studios; Skydance Media; Vinson Films; Project X Entertainment; Toff Guy Films; Radio Silence Productions
- Distributed by: Apple TV+
- Release date: May 23, 2025
- Running time: 125 minutes
- Country: United States
- Language: English
- Budget: $180 million

Fountain of Youth is a 2025 American heist action adventure film directed by Guy Ritchie and written by James Vanderbilt. It stars John Krasinski, Natalie Portman, Eiza González, and Domhnall Gleeson, with Arian Moayed, Laz Alonso, Carmen Ejogo, and Stanley Tucci in supporting roles. Krasinski and Portman play estranged siblings who team up to embark on a journey to find the famed Fountain of Youth.

Fountain of Youth was released May 23, 2025, on Apple TV+, and received mixed reviews from critics.

== Plot ==
Disgraced archaeologist Luke Purdue steals a painting from criminals in Thailand and foils the mysterious Esme and her henchmen, who attempt to seize the painting themselves. In London, Luke surprises his sister Charlotte, a museum curator who is divorcing her unfaithful husband Harold. Stealing another painting from the museum, Luke baits Charlotte into fleeing with him and his partners Murphy and Deb, revealing that he has continued their late father's legacy of treasure-hunting.

Questioned by Interpol Inspector Jamal Abbas, Charlotte is fired and confronts Luke at his hideout, where she is introduced to Owen Carver, a wealthy corporate raider with terminal cancer who is financing Luke and his team's search for the fabled Fountain of Youth. Owen entices Charlotte to join the team with the promise of giving her a powerful lawyer to gain custody of her son. Their father's notes reveal that a secret society known as the "Protectors of the Path" has concealed the Fountain for centuries, but a faction who disagreed with the Path's mission hid clues in six historic paintings Luke has stolen, including Rembrandt's Head of Christ from the museum. Charlotte admits that the Head of Christ is a duplicate, and reluctantly joins her brother's quest.

The real painting was lost in the sinking of the Lusitania, and the team raises the first-class section of the ship to the surface. Recovering the painting from Alfred Gwynne Vanderbilt's safe, Luke and Charlotte are held at gunpoint by Esme and her fellow Protectors, but escape the sinking wreckage with the painting. The team returns to London and the paintings' clues point them to the Wicked Bible, but their hideout is raided by Abbas before they are all ambushed by the Thai gangsters. Provoking a shootout, Luke escapes with his team.

Harold accepts a job overseas, leading Charlotte to bring their son Thomas with the team to Vienna. Examining the Wicked Bible at the Austrian National Library, Luke is again ambushed by Esme, who warns that the Fountain hides a terrible power he does not understand. He and his team steal the Bible, but Charlotte refuses to further endanger her son and storms off. Thomas convinces her to return, having deduced that the code hidden in the Bible is musical notes, which the team identify as an ancient song honoring the Seven Wonders and realize the Fountain is located in a newly discovered secret passage beneath the Great Pyramid of Giza thanks to muography.

Esme meets with the Elder of the Protectors of the Path in the Vatican City, who reminds her that she must do whatever is necessary to keep the Fountain from being unearthed, for humanity's own protection. In Cairo, Carver secures the pyramid with his heavily armed mercenaries, forcing Luke, Charlotte, and Thomas to unlock the secret passage. Abbas arrives with a convoy of Interpol agents, only to be outgunned by the mercenaries, and Deb is wounded as she and Murphy try to intervene. Esme and her fellow Protectors overpower Carver's men, and she and Abbas join forces, pursuing the others into the passage.

In the depths of the pyramid, Luke and the others discover the Fountain. Charlotte realizes Carver is not sick and simply wants to hoard the Fountain's power for himself, but Carver shoots Luke in the arm, demanding he drink from the Fountain to test its effects. A drop of Luke's blood causes the mystical waters to tempt him with a vision of eternal life, at the cost of Charlotte and Thomas' own lives, and he realizes the curse of the Fountain: whatever energy he is granted will be transferred from those he loves most. Luke refuses to drink, and his wounds are instantly healed.

Abbas and Esme reach the chamber just as Carver drinks the water but, as he cares only about himself, he is drained of his own life force. Esme uses a key from the Elder to seal the chamber, trapping the rapidly aging Carver inside as the others escape. Charlotte convinces Abbas to blame Carver for their crimes, and Esme kisses Luke, warning that their paths will cross again if he continues to search for forbidden treasures. Luke reunites with his team, and Charlotte and Thomas suggest their next adventure.

== Cast ==
- John Krasinski as Luke Purdue, Charlotte's older brother
- Natalie Portman as Charlotte Purdue, Luke's younger sister
- Eiza González as Esme
- Domhnall Gleeson as Owen Carver
- Arian Moayed as Inspector Jamal Abbas
- Laz Alonso as Patrick Murphy
- Carmen Ejogo as Deb McCall
- Stanley Tucci as the Elder
- Benjamin Chivers as Thomas
- Michael Epp as Praeger
- Daniel de Bourg as Harold Cross
- Steve Tran as Kasem

== Production ==
It was announced in March 2023 that Dexter Fletcher was set to direct the film, with a screenplay by James Vanderbilt.

In January 2024, Fletcher had since departed the project, with Guy Ritchie now set to direct, with John Krasinski and Natalie Portman cast to star. Principal photography was expected to begin in early 2024. Domhnall Gleeson and Eiza González also joined the cast that month, with Laz Alonso joining in February. Arian Moayed and Carmen Ejogo would be added in March.

Filming took place at Warner Bros. Studios, Leavesden in Hertfordshire, England. It began in Bangkok in February 2024, followed by Vienna in March, and Liverpool in May, and finally in Cairo in July 2024. The movie was officially wrapped in October 2024.

== Release ==
Fountain of Youth released on Apple TV+ on May 23, 2025.

== Reception ==
On the review aggregator website Rotten Tomatoes, 35% of 116 critics' reviews are positive, with an average rating of 4.6/10. The website's consensus reads: "Despite its glossy production and some impressive set pieces, Fountain of Youth can't overcome a derivative and uninspired story that fails to capture the creativity of the countless action-adventure flicks it cribs from." Metacritic, which uses a weighted average, assigned the film a score of 41 out of 100, based on 24 critics, indicating "mixed or average" reviews.

Reviewing the film for The Guardian, Ryan Gibley awarded it two stars out of a possible five, describing it, as a "soulless business-class yarn" and a "hodgepodge of plundered elements (which) adds up to nothing more than Indiana Bourne and the Thomas Crown Da Vinci Code", and summarising it as "derivative and uninspired".

=== Accolades ===
Portman was nominated for a 46th Golden Raspberry Awards for Worst Actress but lost to Rebel Wilson for Bride Hard.
