= Matt Bettinelli-Olpin =

American film director (born 1978)

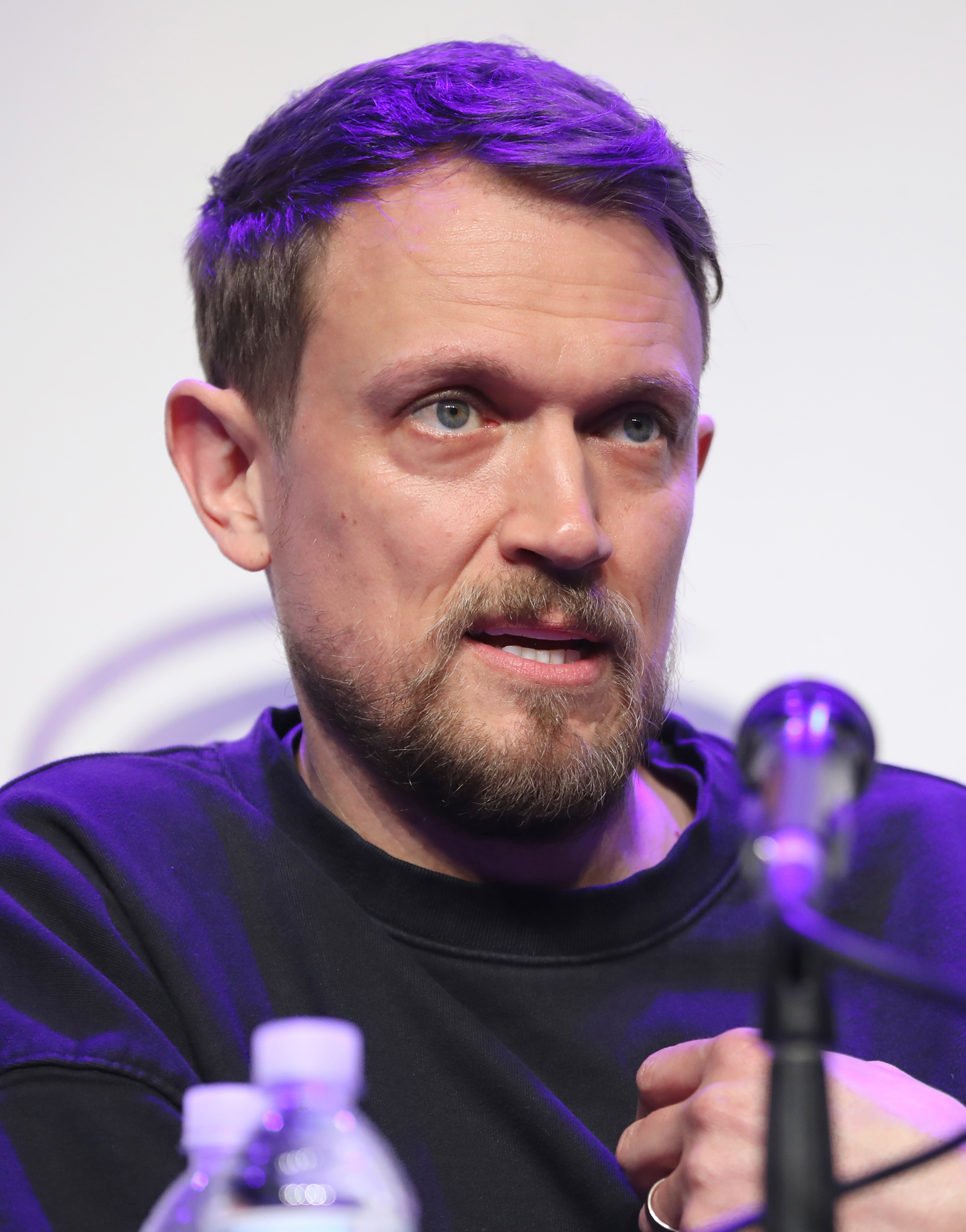
- Bettinelli-Olpin at the 2024 WonderCon
- Born: February 19, 1978 (age 48); Oakland, California, U.S.
- Occupations: Film director; screenwriter; actor; musician
- Years active: 1993–present
- Musical career
- Genre: Punk rock
- Instruments: Guitar; vocals
- Label: Asian Man
- Formerly of: Link 80
- Website: Radio Silence

Matt Bettinelli-Olpin (born February 19, 1978) is an American director, writer, actor, and musician. He is a founding member of the East Bay punk band Link 80 and co-creator of the filmmaking collectives Chad, Matt & Rob and Radio Silence. He is best known for his work in horror films, including V/H/S, Ready or Not, Scream, Scream VI, Abigail and Ready or Not 2: Here I Come. In 2026, Bettinelli-Olpin was included on New York Magazine's list of The 100 Most Powerful Directors in Hollywood and The Hollywood Reporter's list Top Genre Filmmakers of 2026: From Curry Barker to Guillermo del Toro.

== Early life ==
Raised in Oakland, California, Bettinelli-Olpin attended Chabot Elementary, Claremont Middle School and Bishop O'Dowd High School. He attended college at the University of California, Santa Cruz.

== Career ==
=== Music ===
Bettinelli-Olpin formed the Bay Area punk band Link 80 in 1993. On the band's first two albums, 17 Reasons and Killing Katie, Bettinelli-Olpin played guitar, sang backing vocals and co-wrote the lyrics with singer Nick Traina. After leaving Link 80, Bettinelli-Olpin worked as a music journalist and interviewed bands including Alkaline Trio, Dropkick Murphy's, Lawrence Arms, Avail, Blur, Violent Femmes, the Breeders, the Mars Volta and the Psychedelic Furs.

In 2016, Bettinelli-Olpin played guitar in a Link 80 reunion for the Asian Man Records 20th Anniversary. On June 17 and 18, the band played two sold-out shows at the San Francisco's Bottom of the Hill. Before the shows, a video tribute to singer Nick Traina was shown. In 2021, a Link 80 cover of Rancid's "Junkie Man" was released on Lavasock Records' 25th anniversary tribute to Rancid's punk rock classic ...And Out Come the Wolves featuring Bettinelli-Olpin on vocals.

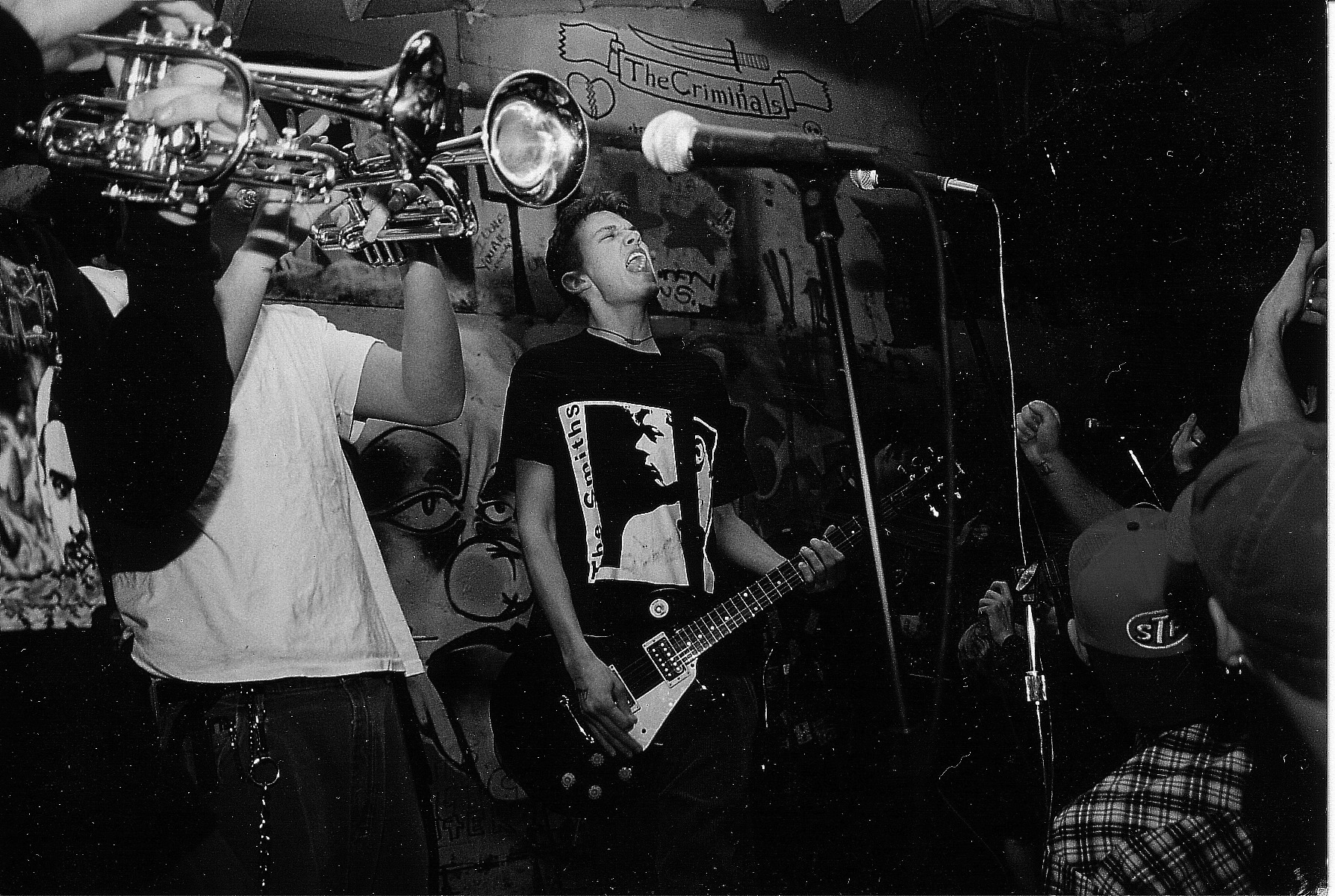
Matt Bettinelli-Olpin at 924 Gilman Street, 1997

=== Film ===
In 1999, Bettinelli-Olpin directed Alkaline Trio's first music video ("Goodbye Forever") while attending the University of California, Santa Cruz. In the early 2000s, he was roommates with The Lonely Island and in addition to appearing in many of their early shorts, Jorma Taccone said it was Bettinelli-Olpin's Roland BR-8 that the group used to record their first songs, saying "I made a bunch of beats on our roommate Matt’s BR-8 digital eight track and we would sample songs from records and loop stuff and then we would make four track beats and we’d stay up till 6:00 in the morning drinking and making songs". While working in the mailroom at New Line Cinema, he formed the filmmaking collective Chad, Matt & Rob in 2007 and Radio Silence in 2011.

==== Chad, Matt & Rob ====
Bettinelli-Olpin co-founded Chad, Matt & Rob with Chad Villella and Rob Polonsky in 2007. The group is known for their unique blend of comedy, adventure, sci-fi and horror. According to an interview in IndieWire, Bettinelli-Olpin worked in the mailroom and later as the office manager at New Line Cinema, where the group would sneak in after hours to use the offices as their sets. Among their numerous short films is the viral found footage style video Roommate Alien Prank Gone Bad and five installments of their first-of-its-kind series of Interactive Adventures. Their work online has over 100,000,000 views.

==== Radio Silence ====
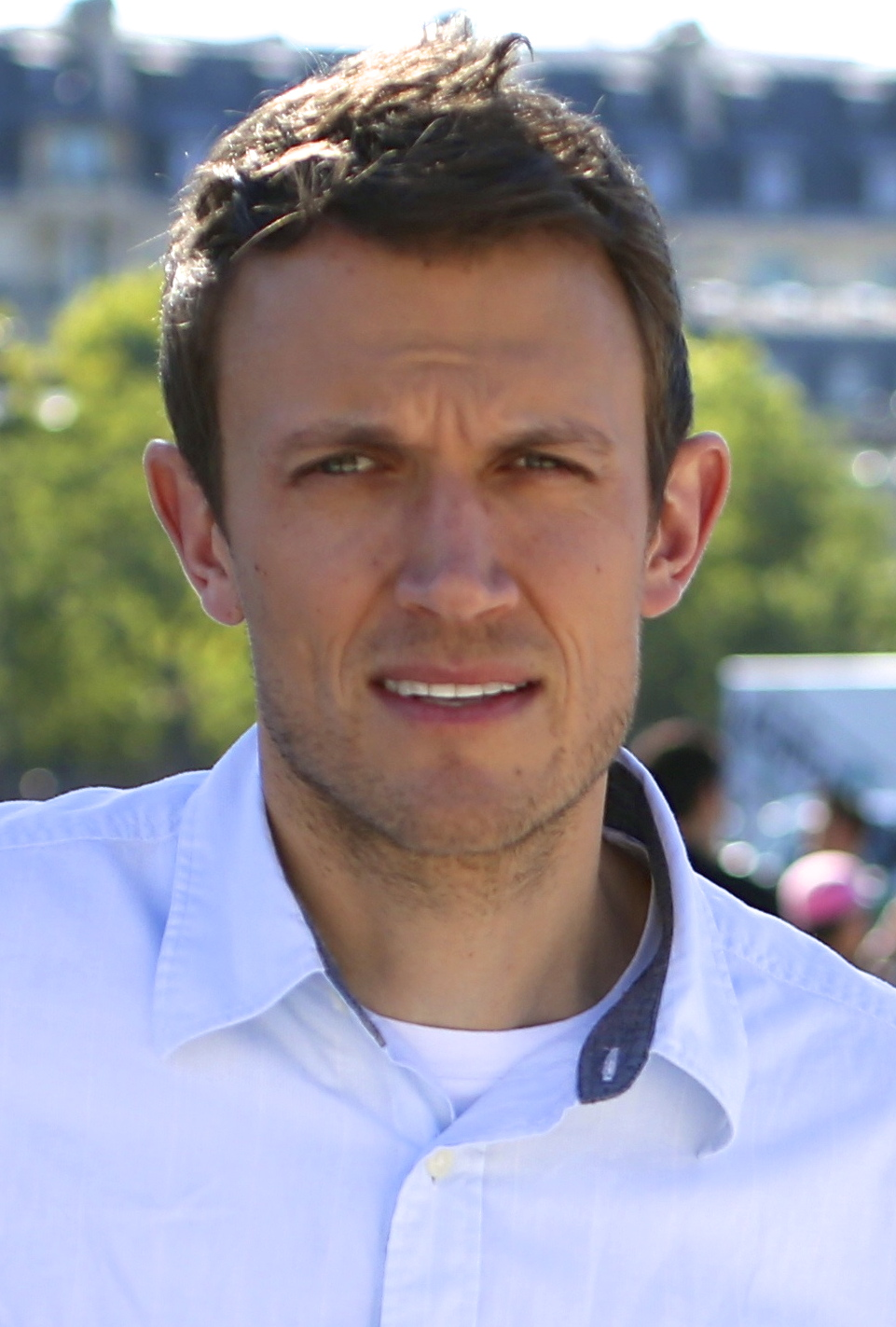
Bettinelli-Olpin in 2013

After the dissolution of Chad, Matt & Rob, Bettinelli-Olpin formed Radio Silence with Tyler Gillett, Justin Martinez and Chad Villella. The group co-directed the 10/31/98 segment of the feature film V/H/S. The film premiered at the 2012 Sundance Film Festival and was released theatrically by Magnolia Pictures in October 2012. The following year, they made Devil's Due for 20th Century Fox and in 2015, their film Southbound premiered at the Toronto International Film Festival. It was released theatrically by the Orchard on February 5, 2016. Paul Thomas Anderson called the film "a hidden gem."

In 2019, Bettinelli-Olpin co-directed the well-reviewed comedic thriller Ready or Not with Tyler Gillett for Fox Searchlight. The film stars Samara Weaving, Adam Brody, Andie MacDowell, and Mark O'Brien. The film was nominated for Best Horror Film at the 46th Saturn Awards.

In March 2020, it was announced that Bettinelli-Olpin would co-direct the fifth installment of the Scream franchise, alongside Tyler Gillett, with Kevin Williamson serving as executive producer. The film was released on January 14, 2022. The film was nominated for Best Movie at the 2023 MTV Movie & TV Awards.

In 2022, Bettinelli-Olpin and Gillett directed Scream VI which was released on March 10, 2023, by Paramount Pictures. The film won Best Movie at the 2023 MTV Movie & TV Awards and ranked #3 on The Hollywood Reporter's list of "The Best Slasher Movies of the Decade".

In 2023, Bettinelli-Olpin and Gillett directed Abigail which was released on April 19, 2024, by Universal Pictures. The film was nominated for Best Wide Release Movie at the 2024 Fangoria Chainsaw Awards. and included on many best of 2024 lists including Variety's "The Best Horror Movies of 2024", Screen Rant's "10 Best Horror Movies Of 2024", Bloody Disgusting's "The 10 Best Horror Movies Released in the First Half of 2024", Time Out's "The Best Horror Movies of 2024" and SlashFilm's "The 19 Best Horror Movies Of 2024 So Far".

Filmed in Toronto during the spring of 2025 and released on March 20, 2026, by Fox Searchlight, Ready or Not 2: Here I Come stars Samara Weaving, Kathryn Newton, Sarah Michelle Gellar, Shawn Hatosy, David Cronenberg, and Elijah Wood. The film premiered at the South by Southwest Film & TV Festival on March 13, 2026, received generally positive reviews from critics and has grossed $41 million against a $14 million budget.

In almost all of their films, Bettinelli-Olpin and Gillett have used music from Asian Man Records artists including Alkaline Trio, Link 80, MU330 and Laura Stevenson and the Cans as well as music from the Bay Area including Too Short, The Atom Age, Link 80, The Jacka, Kamaiyah and P-Lo.

Bettinelli-Olpin portrays Michael Myers in Scream in the film within a film Stab 8 and Ghostface on the TV news segment in Scream VI.

Bettinelli-Olpin is also a producer on V/H/S, V/H/S/94, V/H/S/99 and V/H/S/85.

== Discography ==
- The Link 80 & Wet Nap Split (1995)
- Remember How It Used To Be EP (1995)
- Rumble At The Tracks EP (1996)
- 17 Reasons (1996)
- Killing Katie (1997)

== Filmography ==
Film	Year	Director	Writer	Actor	Editor	Producer	Notes
V/H/S	2012	Yes	Yes	Yes	Yes	Yes	Segment "10/31/98", Role: Matt
Devil's Due	2014	Yes	No	No	No	No	
Southbound	2015	Yes	Yes	Yes	Yes	Yes	Role: Jack
Ready or Not	2019	Yes	No	No	No	No	
Phobias	2021	No	No	No	No	Executive	
V/H/S/94	2021	No	No	No	No	Yes	
Scream	2022	Yes	No	No	No	No	(Note: Bettinelli-Olpin additionally makes an uncredited cameo appearance as Halloween antagonist Michael Myers in a film within the film within a film Stab 8.)
V/H/S/99	2022	No	No	No	No	Yes	
Scream VI	2023	Yes	No	No	No	No	
V/H/S/85	2023	No	No	No	No	Yes	
Abigail	2024	Yes	No	No	No	No	
Fountain of Youth	2025	No	No	No	No	Executive	
Scream 7	2026	No	No	No	No	Executive	
Ready or Not 2: Here I Come	2026	Yes	No	No	No	Executive	
The Mummy: Book of the Dead	2027	Yes	No	No	No	No	Filming
White Elephant	TBA	No	No	No	No	Yes	

== Awards and nominations ==
Year	Award	Category	Work	Result
2012	SXSW	Midnight Audience Award (shared with Ti West, Adam Wingard, et al.)	V/H/S	Nominated
2012	Sitges Film Festival	Best Motion Picture	V/H/S	Nominated
2012	Golden Schmoes Awards	Best Horror Movie	V/H/S	Nominated
2016	iHorror	Best Direct Release Horror(shared with David Bruckner, Roxanne Benjamin, et al.)	Southbound	Nominated
2019	Sitges Film Festival	Best Motion Picture	Ready or Not	Nominated
2019	Fright Meter Awards	Best Horror Movie	Ready or Not	Nominated
2019	Golden Schmoes Awards	Best Horror Movie	Ready or Not	Nominated
2019	Golden Schmoes Awards	Biggest Surprise of the Year	Ready or Not	Nominated
2019	IGN Summer Movie Awards	Best Horror Movie	Ready or Not	Nominated
2019	Fantasy Filmfest	Best 1st or 2nd Feature	Ready or Not	Nominated
2019	St. Louis Film Critics Association Awards	Best Horror Film	Ready or Not	Nominated
2020	Fangoria Chainsaw Awards	Best Wide Release	Ready or Not	Nominated
2020	Hollywood Critics Association Film Awards	Best Horror Film	Ready or Not	Nominated
2020	Hawaii Film Critics Society Awards	Best Horror Film	Ready or Not	Nominated
2020	Columbus Film Critics Association Awards	Best Overlooked Film	Ready or Not	2nd Place
2020	Music City Film Critics Association Awards	Best Horror Film	Ready or Not	Nominated
2021	Saturn Awards	Best Horror Film	Ready or Not	Nominated
2021	Academy of Science Fiction, Fantasy & Horror Films	Best Horror Film	Ready or Not	Nominated
2022	MTV Movie & TV Awards	Best Movie	Scream (2022)	Nominated
2022	People's Choice Awards	Best Movie	Scream (2022)	Nominated
2022	Hollywood Critics Association Midseason Film Awards	Best Horror	Scream (2022)	Nominated
2022	The Queerties	Best Studio Movie	Scream (2022)	Nominated
2022	St. Louis Film Critics Association Awards	Best Horror Film	Scream (2022)	Nominated
2022	GLAAD Media Awards	Outstanding Film Wide Theatrical Release	Scream (2022)	Nominated
2022	Saturn Awards	Best Horror Film	Scream (2022)	Nominated
2023	MTV Movie & TV Awards	Best Movie	Scream VI	Won
2023	Hollywood Critics Association Midseason Film Awards	Best Horror	Scream VI	Nominated
2023	Saturn Awards	Best Horror Film	Scream VI	Nominated
2023	MTV Millennial Awards	Best Movie	Scream VI	Nominated
2024	People's Choice Awards	The Drama Movie of the Year	Scream VI	Nominated
2024	Academy of Science Fiction, Fantasy & Horror Films	Best Horror Film	Scream VI	Nominated
2024	Critics' Choice Super Awards	Best Horror Movie	Scream VI	Nominated
2024	Golden Schmoes Awards	Best Horror Movie	Scream VI	Nominated
2024	Music City Film Critics' Association Awards	Best Horror Film	Scream VI	Nominated
2024	Astra Film Awards	Best Horror Feature	Scream VI	Nominated
2024	DiscussingFilm Critic Awards	Best Horror Film	Scream VI	Nominated
2024	Fangoria Chainsaw Awards	Best Wide Release	Abigail	Nominated
2024	7th Astra Midseason Movie Awards	Best Horror Movie	Abigail	Nominated
2025	Saturn Awards	Best Horror Movie	Abigail	Nominated
2026	South by Southwest	Headliner Audience Award	Ready or Not 2: Here I Come	Nominated
