= Nick Traina =

American singer

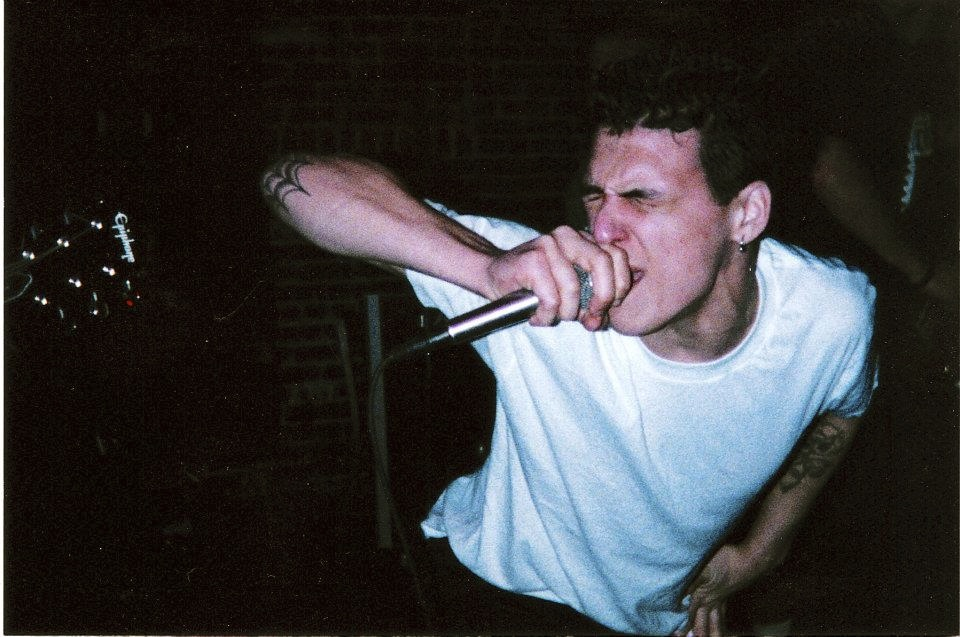

Background information
- Born: Nicholas John Steel Toth; May 1, 1978
- Died: September 20, 1997 (aged 19)
- Genres: Punk rock
- Occupation: Singer-songwriter
- Instrument: Vocals
- Label: Asian Man
- Formerly of: Link 80; Knowledge

Nick Traina (born Nicholas John Steel Toth; May 1, 1978 – September 20, 1997) was an American singer who was the lead singer for the punk band Link 80.

== Life ==
Traina was the son of Danielle Steel and William George Toth.

Traina struggled with mental health issues throughout his life. He was initially diagnosed with attention deficit disorder, then with bipolar disorder, and placed on lithium, which significantly improved his mood and functioning. For five years before his death, Traina was under the care of Julie Campbell, former director of the adolescent program at Newbridge Foundation in Berkeley. Traina lived in a cottage in Campbell's home.

Traina was found dead of a drug overdose in Campbell's home on September 20, 1997. Traina attempted suicide three times before his final, completed attempt. Campbell herself sunk into a depression after his death, and committed suicide three years later.

== Career ==
Traina started his first band, Shanker, at age 13 with Max Leavitt. He joined Link 80 at age 16 and played with them for three years, touring extensively. After leaving Link 80 in August 1997, Traina formed a new band called Knowledge and recorded a demo with them that has since been released on Asian Man Records. A song titled "Gnat" was included on the release; the song was recorded years earlier with Leavitt.

== Discography ==
With Link 80:

- Remember How It Used To Be EP (1995)
- Rumble At The Tracks EP (1996)
- 17 Reasons (1996)
- Killing Katie (1997)

With Knowledge:

- A Gift Before I Go (1998)
