= List of Scream (film series) cast members =

From left to right; Courteney Cox, Neve Campbell and David Arquette, three principal cast members in the Scream films, in a promotional image for Scream 4.

Scream is an American meta horror slasher film series created in 1996 by Kevin Williamson. Each of the films features a large ensemble of actors and actresses. The leading role of the series is Sidney Prescott, portrayed by Canadian actress Neve Campbell, who is accompanied by ambitious news reporter Gale Weathers, played by Courteney Cox, and the police officer Dewey Riley, played by David Arquette, who appear in all five Scream films. Other major recurring characters include film-geek Randy Meeks, played by Jamie Kennedy, and falsely accused opportunist Cotton Weary, played by Liev Schreiber, in the first three films. The series consists of seven films: Scream (1996), Scream 2 (1997), Scream 3 (2000), Scream 4 (2011), Scream (2022), Scream VI (2023), and Scream 7 (2026). The first four films were directed by Wes Craven and scored by Marco Beltrami, who later composed again the seventh film. Kevin Williamson wrote Scream, Scream 2 and Scream 4, but scheduling commitments meant he could provide only notes for Scream 3, with writing duties instead helmed by Ehren Kruger.

The Weinstein Company stated that the success of Scream 4 could lead to potential sequels and a new Scream trilogy, with Arquette, Craven and Williamson all having been contracted or expressed interest in appearing in future installments. However, it was eventually announced the franchise would continue through Scream, a television production that debuted on MTV in 2015. In 2019, Spyglass Media Group acquired the rights to the series. Scream (2022) was announced in 2019, with Matt Bettinelli-Olpin and Tyler Gillett signed on to direct. Campbell, Cox, and Arquette all signed on to return for the film.

The series is notable in the horror genre for casting established and popular actors which, before Scream (1996), was uncommon and difficult, the genre not taken seriously by mainstream actors. In particular, its cast of famous female actresses such as Drew Barrymore and Courteney Cox in prominent, strong roles was considered to give the genre credibility and allow future Scream and other horror films to attract big name actors with greater ease.

== Cast ==
List indicators

This section includes characters who will appear or have appeared in more than two films in the series.

- An empty grey cell indicates the character was not in the film, or that the character's official presence has not yet been confirmed.
- ^{A} indicates an appearance through archival footage or audio.
- ^{C} indicates a cameo role.
- ^{M} indicates an appearance in onscreen movie footage.
- ^{P} indicates an appearance in onscreen photographs.
- ^{S} indicates an appearance through use of special effects.
- ^{U} indicates an uncredited appearance.

Character	Film						
Character	Scream (1996)	Scream 2 (1997)	Scream 3 (2000)	Scream 4 (2011)	Scream (2022)	Scream VI (2023)	Scream 7 (2026)
=== Main/recurring characters ===
Ghostface	Roger L. Jackson^{V}	Roger L. Jackson^{V}	Roger L. Jackson^{V}	Roger L. Jackson^{V}	Roger L. Jackson^{V}	Roger L. Jackson^{V}	Roger L. Jackson^{V}
Sidney Prescott	Neve Campbell	Neve Campbell	Neve Campbell	Neve Campbell	Neve Campbell		Neve Campbell
Gale Weathers	Courteney Cox	Courteney Cox	Courteney Cox	Courteney Cox	Courteney Cox	Courteney Cox	Courteney Cox
Dewey Riley	David Arquette	David Arquette	David Arquette	David Arquette	David Arquette	David Arquette^{P}	David Arquette^{C}
Randy Meeks	Jamie Kennedy	Jamie Kennedy	Jamie Kennedy^{M}		Jamie Kennedy^{P} (Note: Kennedy also voices a partygoer and is credited with "special thanks".)		
Cotton Weary	Liev Schreiber^{M}	Liev Schreiber	Liev Schreiber				
Billy Loomis	Skeet Ulrich				Skeet Ulrich^{S}	Skeet Ulrich^{S}	
Stu Macher	Matthew Lillard (Note: Matthew Lillard has uncredited cameo appearances as extras at parties in Scream 2, and Scream (2022), He was originally intended to be a still-alive Stu in Kevin Williamson's treatment for Scream 3, but the plans were changed when Williamson couldn't write the movie and another screenwriter, Ehren Kruger, was brought on board.)						Matthew Lillard^{C}
Debbie Salt / Mrs. Loomis		Laurie Metcalf					Laurie Metcalf^{C}
Roman Bridger			Scott Foley		Scott Foley (Note: Foley and Jackson appear briefly as their characters in Scream (2022) in archive footage of television series Dawson's Creek 1998 episode "The Scare", which is presented as an in-universe parody of Stab.)		Scott Foley^{C}
Martha Meeks			Heather Matarazzo		Heather Matarazzo^{C}		
Kirby Reed				Hayden Panettiere	Hayden Panettiere^{P} (Note: Panettiere also voices a partygoer and is credited with "special thanks".)	Hayden Panettiere	
Judy Hicks				Marley Shelton	Marley Shelton		
Sam Carpenter					Melissa Barrera	Melissa Barrera	
Tara Carpenter					Jenna Ortega	Jenna Ortega	
Chad Meeks-Martin					Mason Gooding	Mason Gooding	Mason Gooding
Mindy Meeks-Martin					Jasmin Savoy Brown	Jasmin Savoy Brown	Jasmin Savoy Brown
Tatum Evans							Isabel May
=== Supporting main characters ===
Tatum Riley	Rose McGowan						
Casey Becker	Drew Barrymore						
Maureen Prescott	Lynn McRee (Note: McRee is used as the image of Maureen Prescott in Scream (1996) via photograph, but only appears in person in Scream 3. The photograph with Sidney, seen in the first film, is seen again in Scream 2, but her presence is blocked by camera framing.)		Lynn McRee				
Mickey Altieri		Timothy Olyphant					
Derek Feldman		Jerry O'Connell					
Hallie McDaniel		Elise Neal					
Cici Cooper		Sarah Michelle Gellar					
Maureen Evans		Jada Pinkett					
Mark Kincaid			Patrick Dempsey				
Jennifer Jolie			Parker Posey		Parker Posey (Note: Photographs of Spelling, Schwimmer, Posey, Vaughn, Wilson, Silverstone and Graham appear briefly as part of an IMDb cast page in Scream (2022), listing them as the cast of the first in-universe Stab film.)		
Angelina Tyler			Emily Mortimer				
Sarah Darling			Jenny McCarthy				
Tom Prinze			Matt Keeslar				
Steven Stone			Patrick Warburton				
John Milton			Lance Henriksen				
Tyson Fox			Deon Richmond				
Jill Roberts				Emma Roberts			
Charlie Walker				Rory Culkin			
Robbie Mercer				Erik Knudsen			
Trevor Sheldon				Nico Tortorella			
Rebecca Walters				Alison Brie			
Kate Roberts				Mary McDonnell			
Richie Kirsch					Jack Quaid	Jack Quaid^{M}	
Amber Freeman					Mikey Madison		
Liv McKenzie					Sonia Ben Ammar		
Wes Hicks					Dylan Minnette		
Ethan Landry						Jack Champion	
Quinn Bailey						Liana Liberato	
Wayne Bailey						Dermot Mulroney	
Anika Kayoko						Devyn Nekoda	
Danny Brackett						Josh Segarra	
=== Supporting minor characters ===
Principal Arthur Himbry	Henry Winkler						
Kenny Brown	W. Earl Brown						
Sheriff Burke	Joseph Whipp						
Steve Orth	Kevin Patrick Walls						
Neil Prescott	Lawrence Hecht		Lawrence Hecht				
Hank Loomis	C. W. Morgan		C. W. Morgan^{M}				
Reporter		Nancy O'Dell	Nancy O'Dell	Nancy O'Dell			
Guy at Party		Matthew Lillard^{C}			Matthew Lillard^{C}		
Chief Louis Hartley		Lewis Arquette					
Joel		Duane Martin					
Lois		Rebecca Gayheart					
Murphy		Portia de Rossi					
Phil Stevens		Omar Epps					
Joshua Jackson		Joshua Jackson			Joshua Jackson		
Dawnie		Marisol Nichols					
Gus Gold		David Warner					
Officer Andrews		Philip Pavel					
Officer Richards		Chris Doyle					
Christine Hamilton			Kelly Rutherford				
Detective Wallace			Josh Pais				
Bianca Burnette			Carrie Fisher				
Ross Hoss				Adam Brody	Adam Brody^{C}^{U}		
Anthony Perkins				Anthony Anderson			
Olivia Morris				Marielle Jaffe			
Marnie Cooper				Britt Robertson			
Jenny Randall				Aimee Teegarden			
Sherrie (Note: This character only appears in the Stab in-universe films.)				Lucy Hale			
Trudie				Shenae Grimes			
Rachel				Anna Paquin			
Chloe				Kristen Bell			
Vince Schneider					Kyle Gallner		
Deputy Farney					Reggie Conquest		
Deputy Vinson					Chester Tam		
Christopher Stone						Henry Czerny	
Jason Carvey						Tony Revolori	
Laura Crane						Samara Weaving	
=== Stab characters ===
Sidney Prescott		Tori Spelling					Tori Spelling^{P}
Dewey Riley		David Schwimmer					
Gale Weathers			Jennifer Jolie (Parker Posey)		Jennifer Jolie (Parker Posey)		
Billy Loomis		Luke Wilson					
Casey Becker		Heather Graham		Heather Graham^{A}	Drew Barrymore (Note: In Scream (2022), Barrymore appears briefly as the in-universe Stab adaptation of her character, in archive audio of the opening scene of Scream (1996).)		
Sherrie				Lucy Hale			
Trudie				Shenae Grimes			
Rachel				Anna Paquin			
Chloe				Kristen Bell			
Ghostface					Matthew Lillard^{V}		
Stu Macher					Vince Vaughn		
Tatum Riley					Alicia Silverstone		
Randy Meeks					Christopher Speed		
Principal Himbry					Ron Howard		

== Awards and nominations ==
The cast of the Scream series have won, or been nominated for, several awards, most notably Campbell who has received the most wins and nominations of the cast for her role as Sidney Prescott, including the Saturn Award for Best Actress and MTV Movie Award for Best Performance. For Scream (1996) Skeet Ulrich and Drew Barrymore received Saturn Award nominations for Best Supporting Actor. Cox received a Saturn Award for Best Supporting Actress nomination for her role in Scream 2 but lost to Gloria Stuart for Titanic (1997). Despite her brief cameo appearance as "Sidney Prescott" in the film within a film "Stab" series, Tori Spelling was nominated for a Razzie Award for "Worst New Actress" in Scream 2. Campbell and Arquette won Blockbuster Entertainment Awards in the "Favorite Actress – Horror" and "Favorite Actor – Horror" categories for their roles in Scream 2, respectively. Arquette also won Teen Choice Awards and Blockbuster Entertainment Award for his role in Scream 3 in the "Choice Chemistry" (along with Cox) and "Favorite Actor – Horror" (Internet Only) categories, respectively.

Parker Posey's role as Jennifer Jolie received near unanimous praise from critics, with The New York Times' Elvis Mitchell saying "[Posey] alone makes the picture worth seeing. Dizzy and nakedly – hilariously – ambitious, she's so flighty she seems to be levitating." So well received was her performance that she received an MTV Movie Award for Best Comedic Performance nomination in 2000 for the role but lost to Adam Sandler for Big Daddy (1999).

Year	Ceremony	Category	Nominee(s)	Associated film	Result	Ref.
1996	23rd Saturn Awards	Best Actress	Neve Campbell	Scream	Won	
1996	23rd Saturn Awards	Best Supporting Actor	Skeet Ulrich	Scream	Nominated	
1996	23rd Saturn Awards	Best Supporting Actress	Drew Barrymore	Scream	Nominated	
1997	6th MTV Movie Awards	Best Female Performance	Neve Campbell	Scream	Nominated	
1997	18th Golden Raspberry Awards	Worst New Star	Tori Spelling	Scream 2	Nominated	
1998	24th Saturn Awards	Best Actress	Neve Campbell	Scream 2	Nominated	
1998	24th Saturn Awards	Best Supporting Actress	Courteney Cox	Scream 2	Nominated	
1998	7th MTV Movie Awards	Best Female Performance	Neve Campbell	Scream 2	Won	
1998	4th Blockbuster Entertainment Awards	Favorite Actor – Horror	David Arquette	Scream 2	Won	
1998	4th Blockbuster Entertainment Awards	Favorite Actress – Horror	Neve Campbell	Scream 2	Won	
1998	4th Blockbuster Entertainment Awards	Favorite Actress – Horror	Courteney Cox	Scream 2	Nominated	
1998	4th Blockbuster Entertainment Awards	Favorite Supporting Actor – Horror	Jamie Kennedy	Scream 2	Won	
1998	4th Blockbuster Entertainment Awards	Favorite Supporting Actress – Horror	Jada Pinkett-Smith	Scream 2	Nominated	
2000	9th MTV Movie Awards	Best Comedic Performance	Parker Posey	Scream 3	Nominated	
2000	9th MTV Movie Awards	Best Female Performance	Neve Campbell	Scream 3	Nominated	
2001	7th Blockbuster Entertainment Awards	Favorite Actor – Horror	David Arquette	Scream 3	Won	
2001	7th Blockbuster Entertainment Awards	Favorite Actress – Horror	Neve Campbell	Scream 3	Won	
2001	7th Blockbuster Entertainment Awards	Favorite Actress – Horror	Courteney Cox	Scream 3	Nominated	
2011	6th Scream Awards	Best Horror Actress	Neve Campbell	Scream 4	Nominated	
2011	6th Scream Awards	Best Cameo	Kristen Bell and Anna Paquin	Scream 4	Nominated	
2011	Fright Meter Awards	Best Supporting Actress	Hayden Panettiere	Scream 4	Nominated	
2022	30th MTV Movie & TV Awards	Most Frightened Performance	Jenna Ortega	Scream	Won	
2023	Golden Scythe Horror Awards	Best Actress in a Leading Role	Melissa Barrera	Scream VI	Nominated	
2023	31st MTV Movie & TV Awards	Best Fight	Courteney Cox (Gale Weathers) vs. Ghostface	Scream VI	Won	
2024	4th Critics' Choice Super Awards	Best Actress in a Horror Movie	Jenna Ortega	Scream VI	Nominated	
