= Lists of horror film characters =

Lists of horror film characters includes:

== By character type ==
- List of horror film villains
- List of final girls

== By series or franchise ==
- List of Alien (film series) characters
- List of The Texas Chainsaw Massacre characters
- List of Child's Play characters
- List of Evil Dead characters
- List of Final Destination characters
- List of Friday the 13th characters
- List of From Dusk till Dawn characters
- List of The Grudge characters
- List of Halloween (franchise) characters
- List of Hellraiser characters
- List of Let the Right One In characters
- List of The Mummy (film series) characters
- List of A Nightmare on Elm Street characters
- List of Predator (film series) characters
- List of Puppet Master characters
- List of Resident Evil film characters
- List of Ring characters
- List of Saw characters
- List of Scream (film series) characters
- List of Underworld characters

== See also ==
- List of Scream (film series) cast members
- List of cast members of the A Nightmare on Elm Street film series
- List of Hellraiser cast members
- Lists of characters in a fictional work
