= Dewey Riley =

Fictional character from the Scream franchise

- Scream character
- David Arquette as Dewey Riley in Scream (2022)
- First appearance: Scream (1996)
- Last appearance: Scream 7 (2026)
- Created by: Kevin Williamson
- Portrayed by: David Arquette

In-universe information
- Full name: Dwight Riley
- Gender: Male
- Occupation: Police officer; Technical advisor; Deputy sheriff
- Weapon: Gun
- Spouse: Gale Weathers (m. 2001; div. 2015)
- Significant others: Jennifer Jolie (former love interest; deceased)
- Relatives: Tatum Riley (sister; deceased)
- Nationality: American
- Location: Woodsboro, California; Windsor, Ohio; Los Angeles, California; New York City
- Status: Deceased

Dwight "Dewey" Riley is a fictional character in the Scream franchise. Dewey first appears in Scream (1996) as a bumbling police deputy doing his best to deal with the first Woodsboro massacre. He was created by Kevin Williamson and portrayed by David Arquette. A comic relief character of sorts, Dewey is known for his affable personality, his bravery, and his resourcefulness. Arquette was initially called in to audition for the role of Billy Loomis but requested to director Wes Craven that he play Dewey instead, which Craven agreed to.

Initially written to die in the first Scream, Dewey was kept alive in a last-minute decision that Wes Craven considered "The best decision [they] ever made". Despite his clumsiness and initial lack of experience, Dewey demonstrates a genuine dedication to solving the murders that plague Woodsboro, often working side-by-side with love interest Gale Weathers (Courteney Cox). He later became a brother figure to Sidney Prescott (Neve Campbell). The character was a fan favorite and appeared in every Scream movie until his murder was depicted in Scream (2022). Despite this, he appears again in the seventh film.

== Appearances ==
Dewey appears in Scream in 1996, Scream 2 in 1997, Scream 3 in 2000, Scream 4 in 2011, and Scream in 2022, in which the character is murdered by one of the Ghostface killers. During the events of Scream VI, Dewey is mentioned several times. He also makes a posthumous cameo appearance in Scream 7.

=== Film series ===
Dewey as he appears in Scream (1996)

Dewey made his cinematic debut in Scream (1996). In the film, he is a police officer and the older brother of Tatum Riley, the best friend of protagonist Sidney Prescott. Following the murders of Steve Orth and Casey Becker, Dewey questions the students at Woodsboro High School to narrow down suspects. After Sidney is attacked by Ghostface and calls the police, Dewey arrives with the other officers at her house and arrests Billy Loomis. At the police station, Dewey tries to help Sidney contact her father, Neil, to no avail. The following day, Dewey meets Gale Weathers outside the school. The two flirt before a loudspeaker announces that school is being closed due to the recent murders and attacks and that there is a 9 pm curfew set to begin in Woodsboro. That night, Dewey drops Sidney and Tatum off at a house party thrown by Stu Macher and catches Gale and Kenny outside. He tells Gale that he is keeping an eye out in case anything goes awry. Gale says she wants to come inside with Dewey when he goes to check the party out. Dewey and Gale leave after secretly hiding a camera in the party to monitor what happens. They wander down a road, chatting flirtatiously, with Dewey revealing that his real name is Dwight and that Dewey is just a nickname he got stuck with at a young age. They are nearly run over but jump out of the way in time, landing on top of each other and sharing a kiss. Gale notices Neil Prescott's car nearby and alerts Dewey. They run back to the house, with Dewey going inside to investigate. He is stabbed in the back by Ghostface and collapses. After the film's climax, it is confirmed that Dewey survived the stab the next morning.

Dewey's second appearance was Scream 2. Now paralyzed in one leg due to a nerve severed when he was stabbed, Dewey has flown out to Windsor College, Ohio to keep an eye on Sidney. He meets Gale but is upset with her because Gale wrote about him in an unflattering manner in a book she published. Dewey then reintroduces himself to Sidney, who is happy to see him and likens him to an older sibling. When three murders occur – Phil Stevens, Maureen Evans, and Cici Cooper – Dewey, Gale, and Sidney meet with Police Chief Hartley and determine that this is a copycat killing of the 1996 Woodsboro massacre. In a café, Randy Meeks breaks down the rules of horror sequels to Dewey and they then discuss the murders and potential suspects, both playfully accusing each other. Later, while with Randy and Gale, Randy receives a call from Ghostface, and Gale and Dewey unsuccessfully check everyone with a phone to see if it is Ghostface. The two do not notice Randy's disappearance but later find his body in the back of a van. Gale finally wins Dewey back after expressing that she no longer cares about publicity and only wants to stop the murders. They skim through Gale's new cameraman, Joel’s footage to find clues, but are distracted and start making out. They are then attacked by Ghostface, who repeatedly stabs Dewey in the back again. At the end of the movie, it is confirmed once again that Dewey survived the stab, with Gale helping him into an ambulance.

After a romantic relationship between himself and Gale did not work out, Dewey returns in Scream 3. Dewey accepts a job on the set of Stab 3, an in-universe film loosely based on the events of Scream and Scream 2, as a technical advisor and flies out to Los Angeles. One day, Gale arrives on the set to be given the cold shoulder by Dewey before she is kicked off. At a café, Dewey and Gale catch up, Dewey is still upset that she left Woodsboro to chase opportunities after the events of Scream 2, which led to the breakup. Jennifer Jolie invites Dewey to hers, where she is sad about the deaths of Sarah Darling and Cotton Weary. Dewey puts together that the actors are being murdered in the order their characters die in Stab, however since Stab was written with three different endings, it is impossible to predict who will be next. Gale shows Dewey photos of Maureen Prescott and the two notice that she has been to the studio where they are filming Stab. Dewey saves Gale from being stabbed by Ghostface by shooting at him, leading to the two making up. Sidney arrives in Los Angeles and reunites with Dewey and Gale. They go to the place where the photos of Sidney's mother were taken and meet Martha Meeks, sister of Randy, who has a pre-recorded tape Randy made for them. Dewey, Gale, and Jennifer go to confront John Milton about Maureen's involvement with the studio. John says that she became addicted to drugs and lost her career that way. Dewey and Gale go to a party later that night and find a voice changer which Ghostface has been using to mask his identity. They witness Jennifer being stabbed by Ghostface before Gale is abducted and Dewey is knocked out. They are rescued by Sidney who shoots Ghostface. They catch up later after Sidney has taken down Ghostface and when Roman Bridger gets up to attack Sidney, Dewey shoots him, killing him. Back home, Dewey proposes to Gale, who accepts.

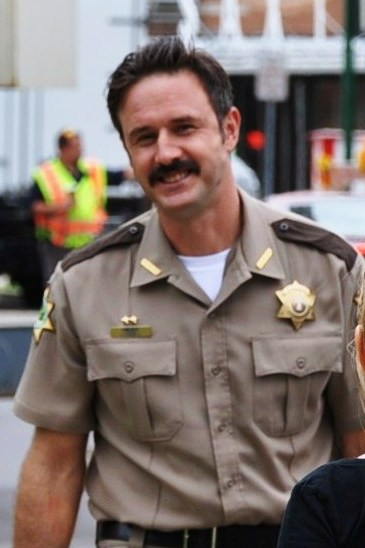
David Arquette on the set of Scream 4

Dewey's fourth appearance was in Scream 4. After the murders of Marnie Cooper and Jenny Randall, Dewey, who now resides in Woodsboro with Gale and works as the town's sheriff, visits Sidney at her book signing, as a phone used in the murders has been tracked there. After questioning Jill Roberts, a cousin of Sidney, and her friends Kirby Reed and Olivia Morris, Dewey praises Sidney for her success since the events of Scream 3. Later at a Stab watch party, Gale calls Dewey to come to her location in case she needs help and when he arrives, he finds her being stabbed by Ghostface, he shoots Ghostface, and yells "firearm" to make everyone leave the party. He then calls an ambulance for her. Dewey later receives a call from Sidney, telling him that she is in danger, and when Dewey arrives Sidney and Jill are badly injured while Charlie Walker and Robbie Mercer are dead. When Jill wakes up in the hospital, Dewey reveals that Sidney survived the attack, with Jill comparing her wounds to Gale's. When Dewey visits Gale, who is also in the hospital, he puts together that Jill should not know about Gale's stab wounds if she were innocent. He rushes back to protect Sidney but is stopped by Jill, who beats him with a bedpan and knocks him out. When he wakes up, he finds out that Sidney and Gale managed to kill Jill and calls for backup.

Dewey's fifth appearance was in Scream (2022). Now a divorced and retired recluse who lives alone in a trailer, he is visited by Sam Carpenter and Richie Kirsch, only letting them in after Sam says her father is Billy Loomis. They ask him for help tackling a Ghostface attack as Sam's sister Tara recently experienced one. He tells them never to trust a love interest, that the killer always has a motive that is connected to the past, and to concentrate their search within Tara's friend group. They ask him to come with them to help solve the case, but Dewey declines and sends them out. He calls Sidney and texts Gale about the new attacks, deciding that he will help after all. He follows Sam and Richie to Chad and Mindy's – nephew and niece of Randy Meeks – house, joined by the remainder of Tara's circle. Later, Dewey reunites with Gale at a crime scene, where it is explained that they broke up as Dewey couldn't bring himself to leave Woodsboro. That night, Tara and Richie are attacked by Ghostface in the hospital, but Dewey and Sam make it in time and Dewey interferes, managing to temporarily neutralize Ghostface during the fight. He rescues them all and evacuates them to safety in an elevator, but recalling previous experiences, decides to go back to finish off Ghostace with a shot to the head. However, he is further brutally stabbed to death by Ghostface (Amber Freeman), who takes his gun. His gun would later be used by Gale to shoot Amber.

=== Other appearances ===
In Stab, the fictional film within a film based on the Ghostface murders, and again in Stab 3, Dewey is portrayed by David Schwimmer and fictional actor Tom Prinze, respectively. David Arquette also reprised his role as Dewey in Creed's "What If" music video from the Scream 3 soundtrack.

In Scream VI, during the New York Murders, Gale tried to interview Sam, who responded unfavorably because Gale had written a book about the 2022 Woodsboro Murders, questioning what Dewey's opinion would be. Subsequently, Gale stumbled upon a shrine utilized by the current Ghostface killers. Upon entering the shrine, she found photographs and sketches of Dewey, along with his badges and firearm. During Sam's conversation with Gale about the loss of loved ones, Dewey's theme is also used. Ghostface subsequently phoned Gale and taunts her about Dewey, prompting Gale to become upset.

In Scream 7, Dewey appears as a highly realistic deepfake created via AI manipulation by one of the Ghostface killers (Marco Davis) to taunt Sidney, blaming her for his death. In it, "Dewey" directly addresses Sidney, reminding her of his death and of all the close ones who died protecting her. All of this makes Sidney lose her temper and demand where her daughter Tatum is.

== Development ==
=== Conception and characterization ===
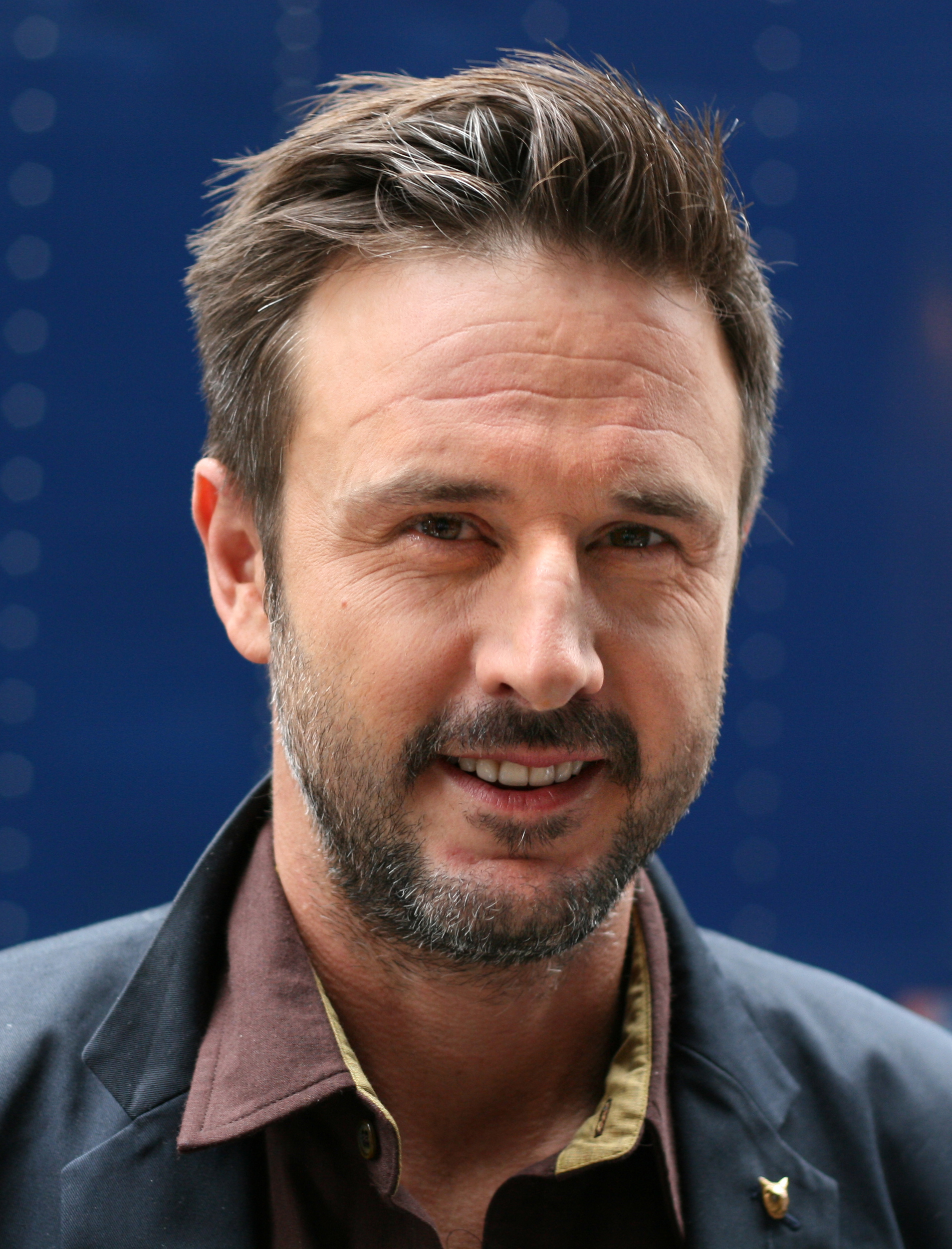
David Arquette (pictured) portrayed Dewey

In Kevin Williamson's original script for Scream, Dewey Riley was planned to die in the film's climax, but a last-minute decision from director Wes Craven changed things, going back to film an ending where Dewey is shown giving a thumbs up when being lifted into the ambulance, in case test audiences reacted positively to the character. The decision was rationalized by Craven, who credited David Arquette's performance as the deciding factor on which ending to go with. He said, "During the course of the movie we realized how his performance was just so witty. Also, we loved him. He played it with such heart, such commitment and everyone kept thinking that". Scream 2 (1997) also featured an alternate ending where both Gale Weathers and Dewey are killed, this time by Cotton Weary, who had snapped in that moment. Arquette was originally brought in to audition for the role of Billy Loomis in Scream, but preferred the character of Dewey and requested to audition for that instead. Despite resistance from the production team, who were concerned that the role was described as "hunky", rather than the younger, goofier approach of Arquette, Craven appreciated the idea and cast him in the role. Dewey is known for his willingness to put his life on the line for others, his loveable, dim-witted personality, and his near-death experiences. Arquette believed that Dewey had the potential of a real hero, like Clint Eastwood's characters. The main theme music of the character, borrowed from Broken Arrow (1996), also resembles the works of Ennio Morricone for westerns — Marco Beltrami, the composer of several films of the franchise, deliberately drew such a musical analogy.

=== Death ===
In Scream (2022), Dewey's death is depicted. Directors Tyler Gillett and Matt Bettinelli-Olpin and executive producer Chad Villella decided to ultimately kill him off for plot purposes, as it was the only way that the character of Sidney Prescott would return to Woodsboro a way to deepen the film's impact, and the team felt it was a necessary sacrifice for the franchise to move forward. When asked about the decision a year later, Bettinelli-Olphin and Gillett believed the decision paid off as they felt Scream VI (2023) was more compelling as so many characters had been impacted by it. Upon reading James Vanderbilt's and Guy Busick's script, David Arquette felt emotional, stating about his script, "I put it down. I took a deep breath. It was sad," he also commented that the decision "cut deep" as he had become attached to the character of Dewey through portraying him for over 25 years.

In spite of his death, Dewey was confirmed to appear in Scream 7 (2026), with David Arquette reprising his role. Arquette was surprised that the news of his return got out, as his appearance in the film was meant to be a surprise.

== Popular culture ==
Dewey's character was directly spoofed in the 2000 film Scary Movie, a parody of '90s slasher films, particularly Scream, Scream 2, and I Know What You Did Last Summer. The character Doofy Gilmore, played by Dave Sheridan, was based on Dewey. He also appears in the sequel Scary Movie (2026).

== Reception ==
Dewey is generally considered one of the most popular characters in the Scream franchise. In a 2023 ranking of the best characters in the Scream franchise, Dewey ranked third, only behind Sidney Prescott and Gale Weathers, with Olly Dyche of MovieWeb writing "Dewey is the hero we all need in our lives". Screen Rant ranked Dewey as one of the 10 best Scream characters, with Aya Tsintziras writing "Dewey is never afraid to be sensitive or share something personal and emotional, and he looks out for everyone who he has helped along the way". Dewey in Scream 5 was ranked as the number 1 horror character that deserved to live by MovieWeb, with Dara Drapkin-Grossi writing "The character served as comedic relief, and always showed up for those he cared about". Dewey ranked among the ten best "final guys" in horror in a 2020 WhatCulture ranking, with Madison Rennie writing that the character is "loveable" and "dim-witted".

The romance between Dewey and Gale Weathers is generally praised for the convincing chemistry between Arquette and Courteney Cox. Ashley Amber of Collider praised the couple's development across the series, writing, "What started as innocent flirting between the two characters quickly blossomed into something much more serious, with the romance of the couple evolving amid the chaos of the Ghostface killings". The couple was ranked 2nd in a 2023 CBR ranking, with Jordan Payeur writing "Their love story is wholesome and realistic, showing them struggling with their differences and remaining protective of one another even when their romance fails". Their storyline was ranked 8th in a Screen Rant ranking of the best love stories in horror films, with Adrienne Tyler writing that the couple "stole the show". Screen Rant also listed the relationship as "relationship goals" in 2019, with Tegan Hall writing "In spite of their vastly different personalities and all their arguments, they would both die and live for each other". They were listed as one of the eight best horror movie couples by Haunt Tonight, writing: "The chemistry between the two characters has made them a standout couple in the horror genre". For Scream 3, Cox and Arquette received the Teen Choice Award for Film – Choice Chemistry.

His death scene proved to be polarizing among fans, with many questioning the likelihood of Amber being capable of taking down Dewey in the way she did, and many feeling the death was unnecessary for the story; some compared it to the death of Glenn in The Walking Dead's Season 7 premiere, with a fan favorite character being killed off and negative backlash against the decision. Neve Campbell, who played Sidney Prescott, admitted that she is unsure about the decision to kill Dewey's character, saying "I still question whether it was the right choice, because from what I'm hearing, there are a lot of fans who are really upset". Courteney Cox also admitted that she opposed the decision. In a 2023 ranking of the most tragic Scream deaths, Jonah Rice of MovieWeb ranked Dewey's as number 1, writing that it is "undoubtedly the most heartbreaking death featured in the Scream franchise". Maddie Davis of CBR criticized the scene, writing, "While it's not impossible for a tiny woman to be a brutal slasher, it's not very likely". Dara Drapkin-Grossi of MovieWeb called the death scene "the stab felt round the world for horror fans". James Egan of WhatCulture called the decision to kill off Dewey "stupid" and criticized the execution of the scene, writing that "Dewey's death made him come across as foolish, not heroic". Hannah Wales of Digital Spy defended the decision to have a legacy character die, believing it helped to distinguish it from the previous sequels and that Dewey was the strongest pick of himself, Gale and Sidney, writing "It had to happen to legitimise the movie and prove that it's not a dumb and lazy repeat of the previous four" and that "Dewey's death might be painful for fans to witness, but it makes logical sense, honours his journey over the past 25 years and does the character justice". Dewey's death scene was voted as the "most tragic horror moment" of 2022 by Dread Central.
