= Scream 7 =

2026 American slasher film

- Theatrical release poster
- Directed by: Kevin Williamson
- Screenplay by: Kevin Williamson; Guy Busick
- Story by: James Vanderbilt; Guy Busick
- Based on: Characters by Kevin Williamson
- Produced by: William Sherak; James Vanderbilt; Paul Neinstein
- Starring: Neve Campbell; Isabel May; Jasmin Savoy Brown; Mason Gooding; Anna Camp; David Arquette; Michelle Randolph; Jimmy Tatro; Mckenna Grace; Asa Germann; Celeste O'Connor; Sam Rechner; Mark Consuelos; Tim Simons; Matthew Lillard; Joel McHale; Courteney Cox
- Cinematography: Ramsey Nickell
- Edited by: Jim Page
- Music by: Marco Beltrami
- Production companies: Spyglass Media Group; Project X Entertainment
- Distributed by: Paramount Pictures
- Release dates: February 25, 2026 (Paramount Pictures lot); February 27, 2026 (United States)
- Running time: 114 minutes
- Country: United States
- Language: English
- Budget: $45 million
- Box office: $213.8 million

Scream 7 is a 2026 American slasher film directed by Kevin Williamson and written by Williamson and Guy Busick. It is the sequel to Scream VI (2023) and the seventh installment in the Scream film series. The film stars Neve Campbell, Jasmin Savoy Brown, Mason Gooding, David Arquette, Matthew Lillard, and Courteney Cox reprising their roles from the previous films, with Isabel May, Anna Camp, Michelle Randolph, Jimmy Tatro, Mckenna Grace, Asa Germann, Celeste O'Connor, Sam Rechner, Mark Consuelos, Tim Simons, and Joel McHale also starring. The film follows Sidney Prescott, whose daughter Tatum is targeted by a new Ghostface killer.

Following the exit of Scream (2022) and Scream VI directors Matt Bettinelli-Olpin and Tyler Gillett in August 2023, Christopher Landon was hired to direct the seventh Scream film. However, the film went through a creative retooling after Spyglass Media Group fired star Melissa Barrera in late 2023, with Jenna Ortega and Landon departing soon after. In March 2024, Campbell confirmed her return to the franchise after being absent from Scream VI, with Williamson hired to direct Scream 7 after serving as writer and producer of the early films in the series. Filming began in January 2025 and concluded that March.

Scream 7 premiered at the Paramount Pictures studio lot on February 25, 2026, and was released in the United States on February 27, by Paramount Pictures. The film received generally negative reviews from critics but became the highest-grossing film of the series and the second highest-grossing slasher film in unadjusted dollars, grossing $213.8 million worldwide against a production budget of $45 million.

== Plot ==
In Woodsboro, Stab fan Scott and his girlfriend Madison visit Stu Macher's house after hearing rumors that he might have survived having a television dropped on his head. (Note: As depicted in Scream (1996)) They are killed by Ghostface, who sets the house on fire.

In Pine Grove, Indiana, Sidney Prescott has built a new life for herself. She is married to police chief Mark Evans, runs a coffeehouse, and raises her children, including her teenage daughter Tatum, named after Sidney's late best friend Tatum Riley. Sidney receives a call from Ghostface, who requests a videocall and reveals himself as an aged and scarred Stu. Stu announces he is going after Tatum and is outside the theater where she is rehearsing. Sidney arrives with the police as Ghostface flees after killing Tatum's friends Hannah and Aaron.

Later that night, Ghostface emerges from Sidney's attic and knocks Mark unconscious. Sidney takes Tatum to a safe room to evade Ghostface and uses the room's alternate exit to leave the house. Ghostface tries to stab Sidney and Tatum through the wall but is eventually fatally run over by Gale Weathers and her assistants Mindy and Chad Meeks-Martin. Once unmasked, Sidney recognizes the killer as Karl Gibbs, a murderer who escaped from a nearby mental institution and bought coffee from her earlier. Sidney visits the institution, where supervisor Marco Davis recognizes Stu as a recently released "John Doe" that had no memory from before he was in Woodsboro and lived in the room next to Karl.

While Sidney agrees to be interviewed by Gale on live television to lure Stu, Tatum meets her boyfriend Ben, her friends Chloe and Lucas, and the Meeks twins at a tavern. Unbeknownst to them, Mark is ambushed and repeatedly stabbed by Ghostface at home. When the interview ends, Stu calls Sidney and warns that he is outside the tavern. Tatum becomes suspicious of Ben when she finds a laptop in his car running a test to deepfake his face into Stu; she knocks him out and runs away. Ghostface injures the Meeks twins and kills Chloe and Lucas before chasing Tatum through the streets. Ben finds her, but Ghostface kills him, and Tatum flees to Sidney's coffeehouse. Following Sidney's call instructions, Tatum retrieves a gun from her office and shoots Ghostface from behind a wall but finds a second Ghostface at the front door.

Stu calls Sidney and reveals Tatum is now being held captive at home. Sidney finds a televised message from Stu, who then proceeds to change his appearance into previous Ghostface killers Nancy Loomis and Roman Bridger, as well as Gale's late ex-husband Dewey Riley, to tell Sidney he is returning to how the original Woodsboro killings started: a person being forced to watch a captive beloved at home. (Note: Referencing the death of Casey Becker and her boyfriend Steve Orth in the opening scene of Scream (1996)) Sidney finds Tatum tied to a chair while Ghostface holds her at knifepoint. Ghostface reveals himself as Marco, who explains he used his previous experience in information technology to create "Stu". He then drags in a wounded Mark as the second Ghostface unmasks to reveal Sidney's neighbor Jessica Bowden. She explains that after reading Sidney's autobiography, she came to the conclusion that Sidney succeeded because she killed those who tormented her, prompting Jessica to murder her abusive husband, as well as her son Lucas, whom she considered very similar to her husband.

When Sidney disappeared from public life and was not present during the New York City killings, (Note: As depicted in Scream VI (2023)) Jessica was disappointed and spent time at the mental institution where she met Marco after discovering where Sidney had moved to. Jessica also explains she will turn Tatum into the new Sidney by repeating the traumatic events that turned Sidney into a final girl. Mark cuts Tatum free, and she attacks Jessica as Sidney shoots Marco dead. Jessica flees, and Sidney chases her before they fight, only stopping once Tatum shoots Jessica. When Jessica attacks again, both Sidney and Tatum repeatedly shoot her in the head.

In the aftermath, Mark is taken to the hospital, and Sidney thanks Gale for having her back and tells Tatum about her namesake. With Gale's blessing, Mindy provides an impromptu news report about the night's events.

== Cast ==
- Neve Campbell as Sidney Evans, Ghostface's main target, having survived several Ghostface killing sprees
- Isabel May as Tatum Evans, Sidney's daughter and Ghostface's new main target
- Jasmin Savoy Brown as Mindy Meeks-Martin, Chad's twin sister, Randy Meeks' niece and a survivor of the two most recent murder sprees
- Mason Gooding as Chad Meeks-Martin, Mindy's twin brother, Randy Meeks' nephew, and a survivor of the two most recent murder sprees
- Anna Camp as Jessica Bowden, Sidney's neighbor and Lucas's mother
- David Arquette as Dewey Riley, a survivor of several previous murder sprees, Gale's ex-husband and a Ghostface victim
- Laurie Metcalf as Nancy Loomis, a past Ghostface killer and Billy Loomis's mother
- Scott Foley as Roman Bridger, a past Ghostface killer and Sidney's half-brother
- Roger L. Jackson as the voice of Ghostface
- Michelle Randolph as Madison, Scott's girlfriend
- Jimmy Tatro as Scott, a fan of the Stab series
- Mckenna Grace as Hannah Thurman, one of Tatum's best friends who is starring in a school play
- Asa Germann as Lucas Bowden, Tatum's friend who is obsessed with the Woodsboro killings
- Celeste O'Connor as Chloe Parker, one of Tatum's best friends whose parents own a tavern
- Sam Rechner as Ben Brown, Tatum's boyfriend who Sidney distrusts
- Ethan Embry as Marco Davis, a supervisor at a mental institution
- Tim Simons as George Willis, the drama teacher at Pine Grove High
- Mark Consuelos as Robbie Rivers, a television host
- Matthew Lillard as Stu Macher, one of the first two Ghostface killers
- Joel McHale as Mark Evans, the police chief of Pine Grove and Sidney's husband
- Courteney Cox as Gale Weathers, a reporter, friend of Sidney and survivor of several Ghostface massacres

Additionally, Kraig Dane portrays Karl Gibbs, a murderer who escaped from the mental institution. Cyle Winters portrays Aaron, a classmate of Tatum's assisting in a theater play. Victor Turpin and Amy Louise Pemberton portray Deputy Meadows and Deputy Cooke, respectively. Maggie and Annabelle Toomey portray Emma and Rebecca Evans, Sidney and Mark's daughters and Tatum's younger sisters, respectively.

== Production ==
=== Development ===
During the premiere of Scream VI (2023), co-director Matt Bettinelli-Olpin said: "We want to be watching Scream movies whether we're involved or not for the rest of our lives". Both Bettinelli-Olpin and co-director Tyler Gillett previously expressed interest in December 2022 in bringing Neve Campbell's character Sidney Prescott back in future sequels, after Campbell declined to return in Scream VI due to a pay dispute with the film's producers. The budget was $45 million (before prints and advertising), which was co-financed 50/50 by Spyglass Media Group and Paramount Pictures.

In August 2023, Bettinelli-Olpin and Gillett exited the project due to scheduling conflicts with their film Abigail (2024). Christopher Landon was hired in their place. That same month, pre-production was suspended due to the 2023 SAG-AFTRA strike. On November 21, 2023, it was reported that Melissa Barrera, who starred as Sam Carpenter in Scream (2022) and Scream VI, had been fired from the seventh film due to pro-Palestinian social media posts about the Gaza war, in which Barrera accused the Israeli government of manipulating The Holocaust to "boost the Israeli arms industry." Spyglass claimed Barrera's posts were antisemitic, which Barrera denied. The following day, Deadline Hollywood reported that Jenna Ortega would not reprise the role of Tara Carpenter due to scheduling conflicts with her starring role as Wednesday Addams in the second season of the Netflix television series Wednesday (2025). Ortega later refuted this, stating in an April 2025 interview that she left due to the changes in the creative team and cast, stating, "The Melissa stuff was happening, and it was all kind of falling apart. If Scream VII wasn't going to be with that team of directors and those people I fell in love with, then it didn't seem like the right move for me in my career at the time".

It was then reported that the film would go through a creative retooling, with the intention of bringing back other actors from the franchise, like Campbell, along with Patrick Dempsey, who portrayed Mark Kincaid in Scream 3 (2000). In December 2023, Landon announced that he had officially exited the film weeks prior. He later explained he felt without Barrera the film he had signed on to direct no longer existed, and therefore there was no reason for him to continue. Despite the fact that Landon was not involved in the studio's actions, he faced backlash and harassment from some Barrera fans online, to the point of having threats leveled against him and his family: "People were threatening to kill me and my family, to the point where the FBI was getting involved. I got messages saying, 'I'm going to find your kids, and I'm going to kill them because you support child murder.' The head of security at various studios and the FBI had to examine the threats."

The writing changes cost the production around $500,000 in rewrites. Those changes happened alongside production changes; Skydance Media, led by David Ellison, reached a deal to merge with Paramount Global in July 2024, with the deal completed shortly after production wrapped, in August 2025. Paramount Pictures also changed leadership during production, with Dana Goldberg and Josh Greenstein installed as new co-chairs and Josh Goldstine as head of marketing. The success of the film after its rocky start was considered a win for the new executive team, as it was the first film distributed and marketed by the new team.

=== Casting ===
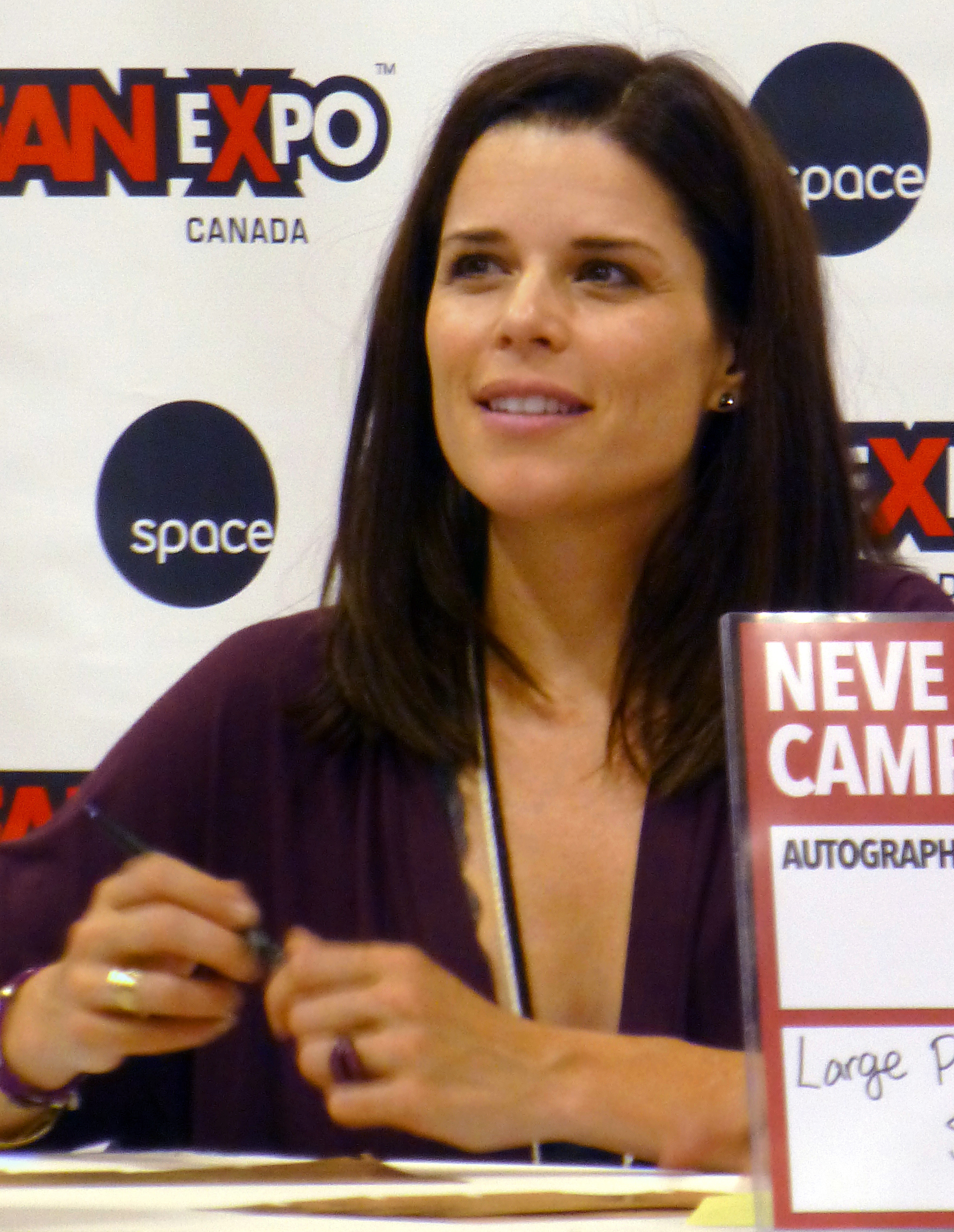
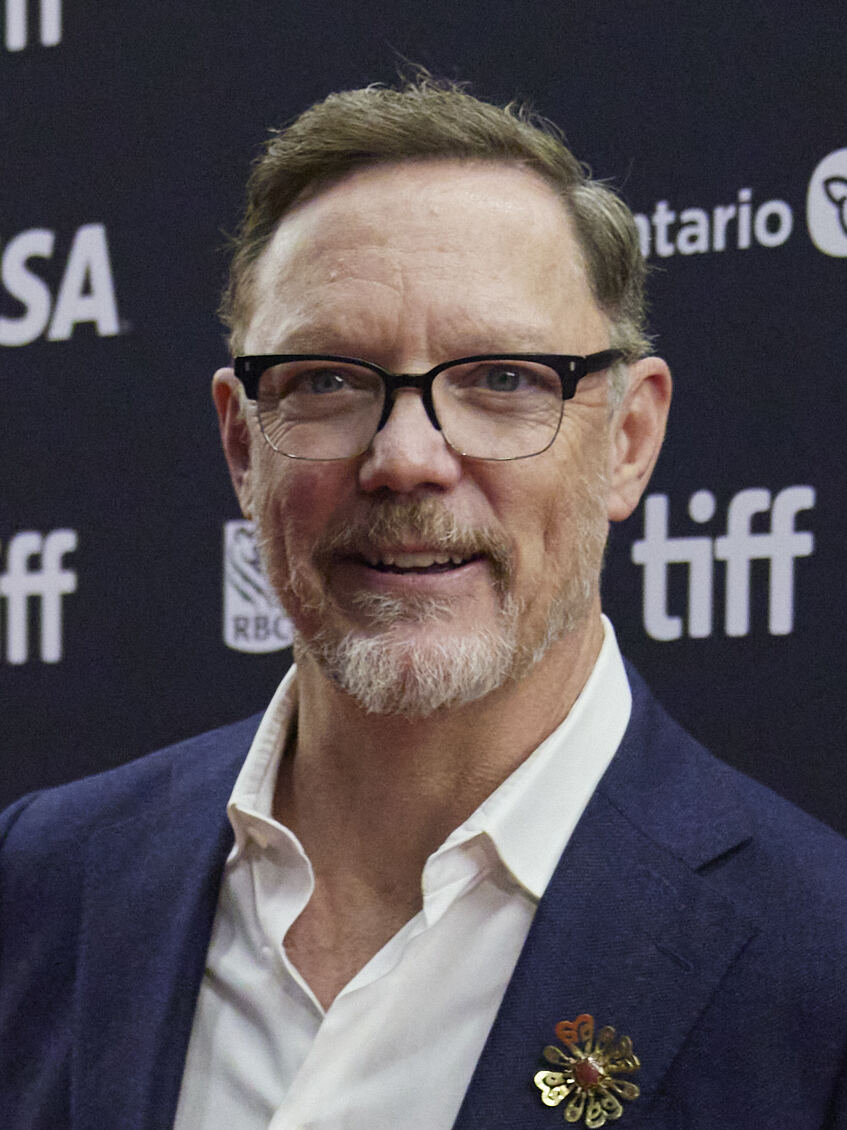
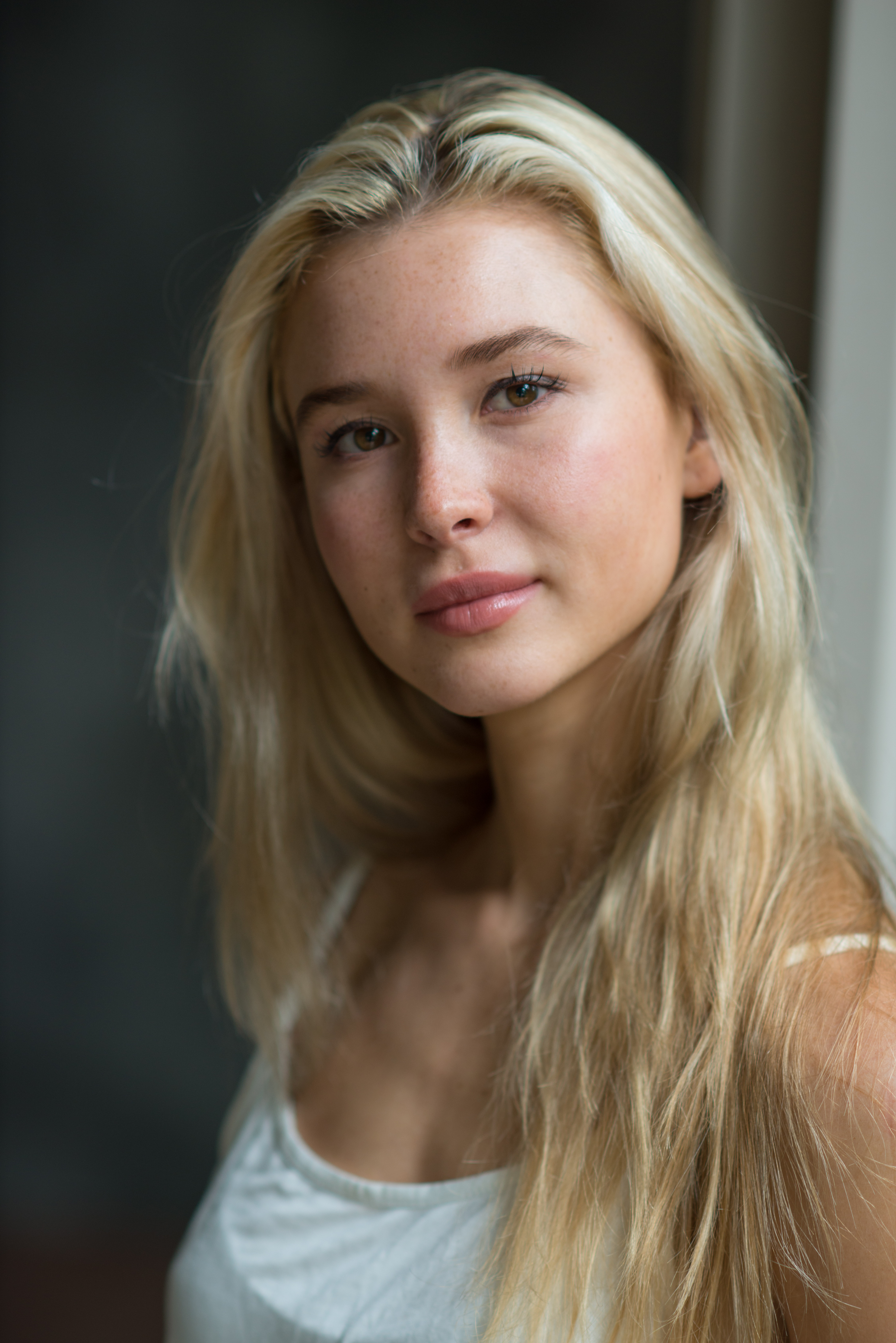
Neve Campbell and Matthew Lillard reprise their roles as Sidney Prescott and Stu Macher respectively, while Isabel May plays Sidney's daughter Tatum.

In March 2024, Campbell posted on her Instagram account that she would return as Sidney. She also confirmed that Kevin Williamson, writer and producer of previous Scream films, would direct from a script by Guy Busick, based on a story by Busick and James Vanderbilt. Campbell's return was supported by many of her movie colleagues, including David Arquette. Later that month, Courteney Cox and Dempsey were in talks to reprise their respective roles as Gale Weathers and Kincaid. It was reported that Campbell was paid $7 million and Cox $2 million.

In November, Isabel May was cast to portray Sidney's daughter. In December, Celeste O'Connor, Asa Germann, Mckenna Grace, Sam Rechner, and Anna Camp joined the cast in undisclosed roles. That same month, Mason Gooding and Cox signed on to reprise their roles from the previous films. Dempsey said scheduling conflicts and the California wildfires prevented him from joining the film. In January 2025, it was announced that Roger L. Jackson would return as the voice of Ghostface and Jasmin Savoy Brown would reprise her role from the previous two films, with Joel McHale cast as Sidney's husband, and Mark Consuelos joining in an undisclosed role. Matthew Lillard and Scott Foley were also cast in the film, who previously portrayed Stu Macher and Roman Bridger in Scream (1996) and Scream 3, respectively. In February, Ethan Embry joined the cast.

In March 2025, David Arquette was confirmed to reprise his role as Dewey Riley, a character killed in Scream (2022), alongside Michelle Randolph and Jimmy Tatro in undisclosed roles. Arquette was surprised the news about his return leaked, as his reprisal was meant to be a surprise and not a spoiler. Tim Simons was revealed as part of the cast in October 2025. In December 2025, Skeet Ulrich revealed that he was originally supposed to return as Billy Loomis in the original version of Scream 7 as part of a three-film arc, but following Barrera's firing and the film's creative retooling, he confirmed he was no longer set to appear in the film.

Mckenna Grace revealed that she originally auditioned for the role of Sidney's daughter Tatum, but she ended up getting the role of Hannah instead.

=== Filming ===
Principal photography began in Atlanta, Georgia, on January 7, 2025, and concluded on March 12. According to Campbell, filming was scheduled to begin in September 2024 and was then delayed until December 2024 due to scheduling issues.

=== Alternate ending ===
Kevin Williamson revealed that the film originally had an alternate ending shown to test audiences that was ultimately cut out, revealing the Stu Macher character was actually still alive.

== Music ==
The film was scored by Marco Beltrami, returning from the first four installments. In late August 2025, Beltrami divulged on his Instagram account that he, alongside an orchestra, had completed work on the score in Budapest. He additionally released snippets, which included new compositions titled "What's in a Name" and "School Drama". Other excerpts featured the franchise's classic piece "Sidney's Lament", as well as an orchestral reinvention of the theme called "Mrs. Evans Lament". The film also features five original songs, including "Twisting the Knife" by Ice Nine Kills (featuring Mckenna Grace), "Rearranging Scars" by Sueco, "Criminal" by Jessie Murph, "The Kill" by Stella Lefty and "Creepin" by Don Toliver.

== Release ==
Scream 7 premiered at the Paramount Pictures studio lot in Los Angeles on February 25, 2026, and was released in the United States on February 27, including in IMAX, a first for the series.

=== Home media ===
Scream 7 was released for digital rental and purchase on March 31, 2026, including over 40 minutes of bonus content such as deleted scenes and behind-the-scenes material. It was then released on DVD, 4K Ultra HD, and Blu-ray on June 16, 2026.

== Reception ==
=== Box office ===
Scream 7 grossed $121.9 million in the United States and Canada, and $91.9 million in other territories, for a worldwide total of $213.8 million. It was the highest-grossing launch ever for a horror movie released in February.

On February 5, 2026, Deadline Hollywood reported that the film was on track for a mid-$30 million domestic opening weekend, which would place it second behind Scream VI's $44.4 million domestic opening weekend. By the week of its release, estimates were raised to $40 million. The film made $7.8 million from Thursday night previews, a franchise record, and revising weekend estimates to $59 million. It opened to $63.6 million, topping Scream VI as the largest for the franchise, though below Scream 2 and Scream 3 when adjusted for ticket price inflation. In its second weekend, the film dropped 74%, and made $17.3 million.

=== Critical response ===
Metacritic review
breakdown (unweighted)

Positive
3 (7%)
Mixed
22 (52%)
Negative
17 (40%)

On the review aggregator website Rotten Tomatoes, 29% of 228 critics' reviews are positive, with an average rating of 4.7/10. The website's consensus reads: "Less a return to Scream's roots than a disappointing creative regression, this seventh entry draws little blood with its dull knife of a script." Metacritic, which uses a weighted average, assigned the film a score of 35 out of 100, based on 43 critics, indicating "generally unfavorable" reviews. Audiences polled by CinemaScore gave the film an average grade of B− on an A+ to F scale, tied with Scream 4 for the lowest of the series, while 61% of those surveyed by PostTrak said they would definitely recommend it.

The Guardian's Benjamin Lee gave the film a three out of five stars, and called it "a scrappy, passably entertaining new chapter that limps to the screen with wounds on show." William Bibbiani of TheWrap wrote, "It's not that Scream 7 is a bad Scream movie. There are no bad Scream movies (yet). Even the worst one is kind of alright, and this is the worst one. It just never seems like there was a story that needed to be told, or a point that needed to be made. There's hardly even a horror trend to explore, let alone explode."

In a negative review for RogerEbert.com, Brian Tallerico wrote, "Every aspect of Scream 7 feels rushed and shallow. It's visually atrocious, suffering from the low-lighting choice that afflicts so many modern movies, and it's cut together with halting, stilted rhythms."

== Controversies ==
=== Boycott ===
Following Melissa Barrera's firing in November 2023 from the film's production due to her pro-Palestinian comments, calls to boycott the film began to circulate on social media. Initially organized by grassroots Scream fans, the boycott has been supported by the Boycott, Divestment and Sanctions movement, Film Workers for Palestine, CodePink, the Democratic Socialists of America, and other organizations. In December 2023, Sad13 released a song titled "Boycott Scream 7".

The film's premiere in Los Angeles was protested by pro-Palestinian demonstrators organized by Entertainment Labor for Palestine, CodePink LA and the Los Angeles chapter of Jewish Voice for Peace. Variety estimated there were about 25 protestors, while TheWrap reported that there were "dozens".

=== Lawsuit ===
Ahead of the film's release, Paramount Pictures and Spyglass filed a lawsuit against Alterian Ghost Factory, who had threatened to initiate litigation over rights to the Ghostface mask after claiming ownership of the mask. In May 2026, Paramount and Alterian resolved their dispute and dismissed their lawsuits against each other.

== Future ==
By the film's release, an eighth film was reportedly in development. Campbell also expressed interest in making an eighth film. On March 31, 2026, it was announced that Lilla Zuckerman and Nora Zuckerman would be penning the script to Scream 8, with the film being confirmed to already be in development through Paramount and Spyglass.
