= Jennifer Jolie =

Fictional character in the Scream film series

- Scream character
- Parker Posey as Jennifer Jolie in Scream 3
- First appearance: Scream 3 (2000)
- Last appearance: Scream 3 (2000)
- Created by: Ehren Kruger
- Portrayed by: Parker Posey

In-universe information
- Full name: Judy Jurgenstern
- Occupation: Actress
- Nationality: American
- Classification: Fictional actress; Portrays Gale Weathers in Stab 3
- Status: Deceased

Jennifer Jolie (born Judy Jurgenstern) is a fictional character in the Scream franchise, and only appears in Scream 3 (2000). Jennifer is an actress cast to play Gale Weathers in Stab 3, the third film in the fictional series Stab based on the Ghostface killings. The character was created by screenwriter Ehren Kruger and portrayed by Parker Posey.

Jennifer is introduced as a career-focused actress who studies Gale to perform her role. She studies Gale's behavior and mannerisms and copies the way she acts, using humor and bold reactions to get what she wants. She is also strategic, especially in her scenes with Dewey Riley, where she tries to use other people's weaknesses. Posey said the role was fun to play and gave her the chance to use exaggerated comedy. Posey was nominated in 2000 for an MTV Movie Award for Best Comedic Performance for her role as Jennifer Jolie, losing to Adam Sandler, who won it for his performance in Big Daddy (1999).

== Appearances ==
Only appeared in Scream 3 (2000), Jennifer Jolie is introduced during the filming of Stab 3. She plays Gale Weathers in the movie within the movie. When a new series of murders begins, Jennifer becomes concerned and hires protection. Steven Stone is hired as her bodyguard, and Dewey Riley also helps provide security.

After the killings continue, the remaining cast members meet at Jennifer's house. Jennifer and Dewey grow closer, which upsets Gale. During a power outage, the killer reveals that he is targeting the actors. Steven Stone is killed, and the group receives pages of the Stab 3 script that hint at the next victim. Soon after, Tom Prinze is killed in an explosion, and Jennifer's house is destroyed.

Jennifer later spends more time with Gale and Dewey for protection, since she no longer has a house or a bodyguard. She explains that if the killer reaches them, he will target Gale first, not her. Together, the group investigates the connection to Maureen Prescott, the mother of Sidney Prescott, and learns that Maureen lived in Hollywood for a time and appeared in several films by horror producer John Milton. Jennifer, Gale, and Dewey confront Milton about this.

While visiting Milton's house to celebrate Roman Bridger's birthday, the killer attacks again. Jennifer is initially with Gale and Dewey but becomes separated after rolling into a hidden room. She tries to outsmart the killer, but when she enters a hall with a one-way mirror, the killer finds her again. She tries to survive, but she is stabbed by Ghostface and killed.

== Development ==
=== Characterization ===
Jennifer Jolie was created by Ehren Kruger for Scream 3 (2000), with the character's last name is a homage to actress Angelina Jolie. The character was written to poke fun at the horror genre while still being part of it. Jennifer is an actress who is cast to play Gale Weathers in Stab 3, the film being made in the story. Jennifer studies how Gale moves and talks, and she pays attention to her expressions and speech so she can imitate them. She tends to act in an over-the-top way, using humor to get what she wants or to influence other people. In some scenes, she also tries to get help from Dewey Riley.

Jennifer is shown as a very dramatic actress, which leads to both funny and tense moments in the film. One of her most remembered scenes is her death behind a one-way mirror, where the killer appears on the other side.

=== Casting ===
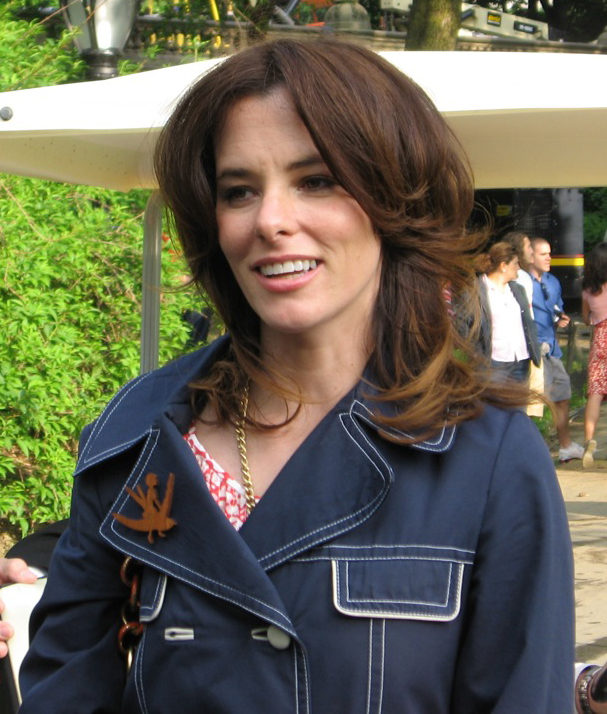
Parker Posey was cast as Jennifer Jolie, who appeared only in Scream 3 (2000).

Parker Posey was cast as Jennifer Jolie. She described the role as "fun", noting that it allowed her to exaggerate and play comedic moments while also parodying a character type in the franchise. Posey later revealed she pitched ways for Jennifer to return in future installments, pointing out that her death was never fully confirmed. The role gave Posey the chance to use self-aware humor and show her comedic timing within a horror film. She balanced the comedy and the serious moments, which helped the character fit well into the film.

== Reception ==
Jennifer Jolie is one of the most notable characters in the Scream franchise, and her scenes with Gale Weathers show humor and clever, self-aware moments that critics appreciated. Joe George of Den of Geek called her performance pitch-perfect, adding humor and personality to the film. Vanessa Maki of The Mary Sue noted Jennifer's outfits, mannerisms, and her interactions with Gale, saying her early death left fans wanting more.

Trace Thurman of Bloody Disgusting wrote that the scenes between Jennifer and Gale were some of the best in the sequences. Perri Nemiroff of Collider said her death behind a two-way mirror combined comedy and horror effectively. In 2000, Posey received a nomination for the MTV Movie Award for Best Comedic Performance for her role as Jennifer Jolie.
