= Gale Weathers =

Fictional character in the Scream film series

- Scream character
- Courteney Cox as Gale Weathers in Scream 4
- First appearance: Scream (1996)
- Created by: Kevin Williamson
- Portrayed by: Courteney Cox

In-universe information
- Aliases: Gale Riley; Gale Weathers Riley; Miss Weathers; Mrs. Riley
- Occupation: News reporter Television personality Author; Television host
- Family: Tatum Riley (sister-in-law; deceased); Mrs. Riley (mother-in-law)
- Spouse: Dewey Riley (m. 2001; div. 2015)
- Significant others: Brooks (former boyfriend; deceased)
- Location: Woodsboro, California, US; Windsor College, Ohio; Hollywood, California; New York City
- Status: Alive

Gale Weathers is a fictional character of the Scream film series, created by Kevin Williamson and portrayed by Courteney Cox. The character first appeared in Scream (1996), followed by six sequels: Scream 2 (1997), Scream 3 (2000), Scream 4 (2011), Scream (2022), Scream VI (2023) and Scream 7 (2026). She is the only character who has appeared in every film in the series. For playing Gale, Cox also holds the record of being the only actress to appear in seven consecutive films of a horror franchise. At the MTV Movie & TV Awards, Scream VI (2023) won Best Fight (Courteney Cox vs Ghostface) for the scene where Ghostface attacks the character, the first time in the franchise where the killer and the character interacted over the phone.

Gale Weathers appears in the Scream films as an ambitious, strong-willed journalist and writer who is initially built up as an antihero, but ultimately joins forces with Sidney Prescott (Neve Campbell) and Dewey Riley (David Arquette), the latter of whom she eventually falls in love with and marries, in order to investigate and stop the Ghostface murders. As a recurring gag, she gets punched by several characters who're affected by the murders after angering them while they're being interviewed.

In the movie-within-a-movie Stab universe, Gale Weathers is originally portrayed by actress Judy Jurgenstern under the stage name Jennifer Jolie (portrayed by Parker Posey in real-life) in the first two Stab films. During the production of the original Stab 3 known as Stab 3: Return to Woodsboro, Jurgenstern is murdered by Roman Bridger (Scott Foley), Sidney (Campbell)'s half-brother. Scream 4 reveals Stab 3 was eventually re-made based on the events of the studio murders, implying Jurgenstern was recast for the third movie-within-a-movie.

== Appearances ==
=== Scream (1996) ===
Gale Weathers' first cinematic appearance was in Scream (1996) as the fame-seeking reporter who has written a novel on Maureen Prescott's death, explaining how she thinks Cotton Weary has been falsely identified as the murderer. When she arrives in Woodsboro with her cameraman, she is rude, bossy and goes to great lengths to get a good story (such as videotaping unsuspecting teens at a house party). Gale has chemistry throughout the film with Deputy Dewey Riley as they investigate the murders. When she finds her cameraman dead near Stu's house, she enters the house and helps Sidney Prescott by shooting one of the serial killers, Billy Loomis.

=== Scream 2 (1997) ===
Gale Weathers' second appearance was in Scream 2. She has written a successful book on the events that took place in the first film called The Woodsboro Murders that has turned into a film called Stab. Sidney, although grateful she saved her life, refuses to do an interview with Cotton Weary, who is also seeking fame at the campus. Gale and Dewey's relationship, although strained at first, eventually turns heated. The killer pursues Gale after repeatedly stabbing Dewey, who is left for dead. In the climax, Gale is brought in by Mrs. Loomis, known as Debbie Salt throughout the movie, to the school theater. Mickey shoots Gale after Mrs. Loomis shoots him and she falls off the stage. However, the bullet bounces off Gale's ribs, allowing her to survive. Once the whole ordeal is over, Mickey suddenly springs to life and is shot to death by Sidney and Gale. During the end of the film, Gale finds out that Dewey is not dead and goes with him to the hospital to recover.

=== Scream 3 (2000) ===
Gale's third appearance occurred in Scream 3. Unlike the first two films, Gale has no intention of getting a good story or seeking fame. Instead, she merely wants conclusion over the mysterious past of Maureen Prescott, whom she wrote a successful book about. After writing another book on the copycat killings that took place in Windsor College, she is informed that Cotton Weary has been murdered and immediately visits the set of Stab 3: Return to Woodsboro, based on Sidney and her experiences. Gale is reunited with Dewey after meeting the actress who portrays her, Jennifer Jolie. Gale and Dewey's relationship has been broken since the events of the second film, and they often argue. However, near the film's end, they reconcile their relationship. Gale is attacked by Ghostface, but is saved by Dewey. She survives the climax in the Hollywood home of John Milton. At the end, Dewey asks Gale to marry him, which she accepts.

=== Scream 4 (2011) ===
Gale's fourth appearance is in Scream 4. Now married for ten years and having taken on her husband's name, Gale tries to reinvent herself by writing fiction but struggles with writer's block. The murders reoccurring in Woodsboro are a major opportunity for her as a writer. Dewey, however, doesn't agree with her being a part of the investigation. Gale decides to work alone and goes undercover at a Stab-a-thon party, where she believes the killer will strike next. Gale's plan to catch the killer fails when she is attacked. Although Dewey arrives in time to save her, the killer manages to stab Gale in the shoulder before escaping. Having been in a critical condition, she recovers at the hospital and with Dewey manages to put the pieces together that Jill Roberts is the true killer. Gale distracts Jill in the final confrontation long enough for Sidney to shock Jill with a defibrillator before shooting her in the heart.

=== Scream (2022) ===
Gale's fifth appearance is in Scream (2022). She and Dewey are revealed to have gotten a divorce following a move to New York City. Gale's successful career put a strain on their marriage causing Dewey to return to Woodsboro where he found solace in the mornings watching Gale cover the news. Following the resurfacing of Ghostface, Dewey calls Sidney Prescott warning her to stay away from Woodsboro but alerts Gale via a text message. Unfortunately, the news station sends Gale to Woodsboro to cover the news where she meets Sam Carpenter, the illegitimate daughter of Billy Loomis. Sheriff Judy Hicks and her son Wes have been murdered and Gale meets with Sam and, when learning that she knew Wes and used to get in trouble a lot with Judy, Gale consoles her. When seeing that she is with Dewey, she approaches him to demand to know why he chose to cover this alone. She is shocked to learn that Dewey, following his inability to properly protect the citizens of Woodsboro, had been asked to resign from his position as Sheriff. Gale and Dewey have an emotional heart-to-heart where she admits that she came back out of concern for him. Dewey, still skeptical of Gale's intentions, suspects she is doing this for publicity but their argument comes to a peaceful resolve when they acknowledge why they didn't work out. When Sam's half-sister Tara is revealed to have been left alone at the hospital, Dewey takes Sam there where they manage to save Tara but Dewey, while trying to finish off Ghostface, is killed. Gale is devastated and informs Sidney, who returns to Woodsboro after being filled in on the issue. Sidney and Gale both try to convince Sam to help them take down Ghostface but Sam decides to take Tara and leave Woodsboro with Richie. Sidney reveals that she put a tracker on Sam's car before they left. While following the trio, Gale laments writing the book on original Woodsboro killings, claiming that if she hadn't, Dewey would still be alive. Sidney advises Gale not to blame herself. The two are shocked when they discover that the trio have stopped at Amber's house to get an extra inhaler for Tara. Amber had actually moved into Stu Macher's old house. They warn Sam to leave as soon as possible. When they arrive, Amber is revealed to be the killer when she feigns an injury. When her ruse doesn't sell, she shoots Gale in the abdomen, with Gale telling Sidney to finish her off for Dewey. Richie is revealed to be the mastermind behind the killings, being a huge fan of the Stab franchise, yet disappointed with the trajectory of the films, initiating the killings to provide source material for the new Stab movies. Gale and Sidney help Sam and Tara fight back against Amber and Richie. Gale and Amber fight with Gale shooting Amber, causing her to fall onto the kitchen stove and get lit aflame. Sam kills Richie and shoots him in the head. A badly-burnt Amber tries to attack Sidney, Gale, and Sam but is shot dead by Tara. When paramedics, police, and news reporters arrive, Sam thanks Sidney and Gale before heading to the hospital with Tara. Gale decides to let Amber and Richie die in anonymity and instead write a book about Dewey and what a good man he was.

=== Scream VI (2023) ===
Scream VI picks up around a year later and reveals that Gale has gone back on her word and written a book about the events that took place in Scream (2022), causing Samantha and Tara Carpenter to resent her, although Gale is shown to not feel good about doing so. A new Ghostface appears in New York City and commits several murders before Gale is then reunited with the Carpenter sisters, the Meeks-Martin twins and fellow Woodsboro survivor Kirby Reed. Gale manages to use her investigative skills to locate an abandoned theatre which has been turned into a shrine, memorializing all past Ghostface victims and killers. Gale is later seen in her apartment, where she is revealed to have a new boyfriend, who is quickly murdered by Ghostface. A chase then ensues, with Gale being attacked and stabbed numerous times. Before Ghostface can deliver a final stab, Samantha and Tara arrive with paramedics who are able to tend to Gale, who instructs the girls to tell Sidney Prescott that “he never got her” before passing out. The paramedics then reveal Gale has a very weak pulse and is taken to hospital for medical attention, and it is later revealed at the end of the movie that Gale has survived her attack.

=== Scream 7 (2026) ===
In Scream 7 Gale first appears after hitting one of the Ghostface killers with her car, killing them. It is then shown that she has recruited Chad & Mindy Meeks-Martin as her interns after her morning show was cancelled and she attempts to rebrand herself as a true crime reporter. After reuniting with Sidney, Gale is shown to have nerve damage in her hand after her attack in New York City, as depicted in Scream VI, and she still grieves the loss of Dewey. She interviews Sidney in order to try to draw out the killer, and later reunites with Sidney after the Ghostfaces are both defeated.

== Casting and development ==
The production wanted a recognizable face for the role of news reporter Gale Weathers, offering it to both Brooke Shields and Janeane Garofalo. Courteney Cox, who was starring in the highly successful NBC sitcom Friends (1994-2004) at the time, was not considered due to her history of playing softer, kinder characters. Cox, however, lobbied hard for the role for that reason, wishing to play a "bitch" character that contrasted her role as Monica Geller in Friends, her efforts ultimately succeeding when she was cast.

Cox's casting in the film series marked a new trend in casting established and popular actors and actresses in horror films. Director Wes Craven opined that her presence, like Neve Campbell's as Sidney Prescott, helped raise the profile of Scream (1996) and attract a large female audience.

== Reception ==
Cox's performance in the series earned critical acclaim and wide recognition. The character became well known for her "snappy remarks and being brilliantly bossy".

Cox was nominated for numerous accolades for her performances as Gale Weathers. For Scream 2, she received the Fangoria Chainsaw Award for Best Supporting Actress and earned a nomination for the Saturn Award for Best Supporting Actress. For Scream 3, Cox and Arquette received the Teen Choice Award for Film – Choice Chemistry.

== Popular culture ==
The character of Gale Weathers was directly spoofed in the 2000 film Scary Movie, a parody of '90s slasher films, particularly Scream (1996), Scream 2, and I Know What You Did Last Summer. The character Gail Hailstorm, played by Cheri Oteri, was a parody of Courteney Cox's character. Gail also appeared in the 2026 sequel also titled Scary Movie.
