= Jill Roberts (Scream) =

Fictional character in the Scream film series

- Scream character
- Emma Roberts as Jill Roberts in Scream 4
- First appearance: Scream 4 (2011)
- Last appearance: Scream 4 (2011) (Note: Also mentioned through a photograph in Scream VI (2023))
- Created by: Kevin Williamson
- Portrayed by: Emma Roberts

In-universe information
- Occupation: High school student
- Family: Kate Roberts (mother, deceased); Sidney Prescott (cousin); Roman Bridger (cousin, deceased); Maureen Prescott (aunt, deceased)
- Nationality: American
- Location: Roberts Residence, Woodsboro, California
- Classification: Mastermind serial killer; A seventh Ghostface killer
- Status: Deceased

Jill Roberts is a fictional character and main antagonist from the Scream franchise. The character was created by Kevin Williamson and portrayed by actress Emma Roberts. She only appeared in Scream 4 (2011) as one of the main killers, and appears in a photograph in Scream VI (2023).

Jill is introduced as the cousin of Sidney Prescott and Roman Bridger, and as a friend of Kirby Reed. At first, Jill appears to be an ordinary high school student in Woodsboro, California. Later, it is revealed that she is one of the killers. She envies Sidney and wants to be the only one left alive so she can gain attention.

== Appearances ==
Jill Roberts appears only in Scream 4 (2011), which takes place fifteen years after the original Woodsboro murders. She is the daughter of Kate Roberts and the cousin of Sidney Prescott. At first, Jill is shown as a normal high school student living in Woodsboro with her friends Kirby Reed, Olivia Morris, and Charlie Walker. When a new series of Ghostface killings begins during the 15th anniversary of the earlier murders, Jill appears to be one of the possible targets. Sidney returns to Woodsboro to promote her book, and the murders soon begin to affect people close to Jill. Her friend Olivia is killed, and suspicion spreads among the group of teenagers while Dewey Riley, now the town's sheriff, investigates the case with help from his deputies and Gale Weathers. Jill reveals that she and Charlie Walker were behind the murders. She explains that she is jealous of Sidney and the attention Sidney received after surviving the earlier killings. Jill wants to become famous as the lone survivor of a new massacre. To achieve this, she kills Charlie and frames her ex-boyfriend Trevor Sheldon as the other killer by injuring herself. Jill goes to the Intensive care unit (ICU) and tries to attack Sidney. Dewey arrives, but Jill knocks him out. When Gale and Deputy Judy Hicks show up, Jill shoots Judy. As she moves to attack Gale, Sidney wakes up and shocks Jill with defibrillator pads. Jill makes one last attempt with a broken glass shard, but Sidney shoots her in the chest, finally ending her killing spree.

=== Other appearances ===
In Scream VI (2023), Jill is mentioned by Kirby while she and Wayne Bailey are going over the timeline of Ghostface's killings. At the shrine that Richie created, Kirby looks with teary eyes at the shirt Jill wore during the final scene of the previous movie.

== Development ==
=== Conception and characterization ===
Jill Roberts was created by screenwriter Kevin Williamson as the primary antagonist of Scream 4 (2011). Williamson originally planned for Jill to survive the events of Scream 4 and carry on as the new face of the franchise. He recently described this plan [Jill] as a chaotic, meta fever dream. In an abandoned concept for the fifth Scream film, Jill would have gone to college while continuing her role as the mastermind behind the killings, maintaining her position as a cunning and dangerous figure in the series.

Jill was designed as a subversion of the traditional "final girl" archetype. She combines charm, intelligence and cruelty, making her both a believable high school student and a calculating killer. Her goal of becoming famous by surviving the killings distinguishes her from earlier characters in the franchise.

=== Casting ===
Emma Roberts was cast as Jill after auditioning for the part. She said she was "shocked and excited" when she landed the role. According to Roberts, her hair was short and blonde during the audition, but director Wes Craven required her to dye [to black] it to match Neve Campbell's look after she was cast. Ashley Greene was originally considered for the role of Jill before Roberts was eventually cast. Craven praised her for being able to play a character who seemed innocent but was secretly planning murders. Her scenes with Hayden Panettiere, especially the window scream, were memorable and showed her skill in mixing fear with a dark sense of fun. In 2023, Scream VI (2023) directors Matt Bettinelli-Olpin and Tyler Gillett spoke about Jill's fate, with Gillett saying "I think everybody can come back".

== Reception ==
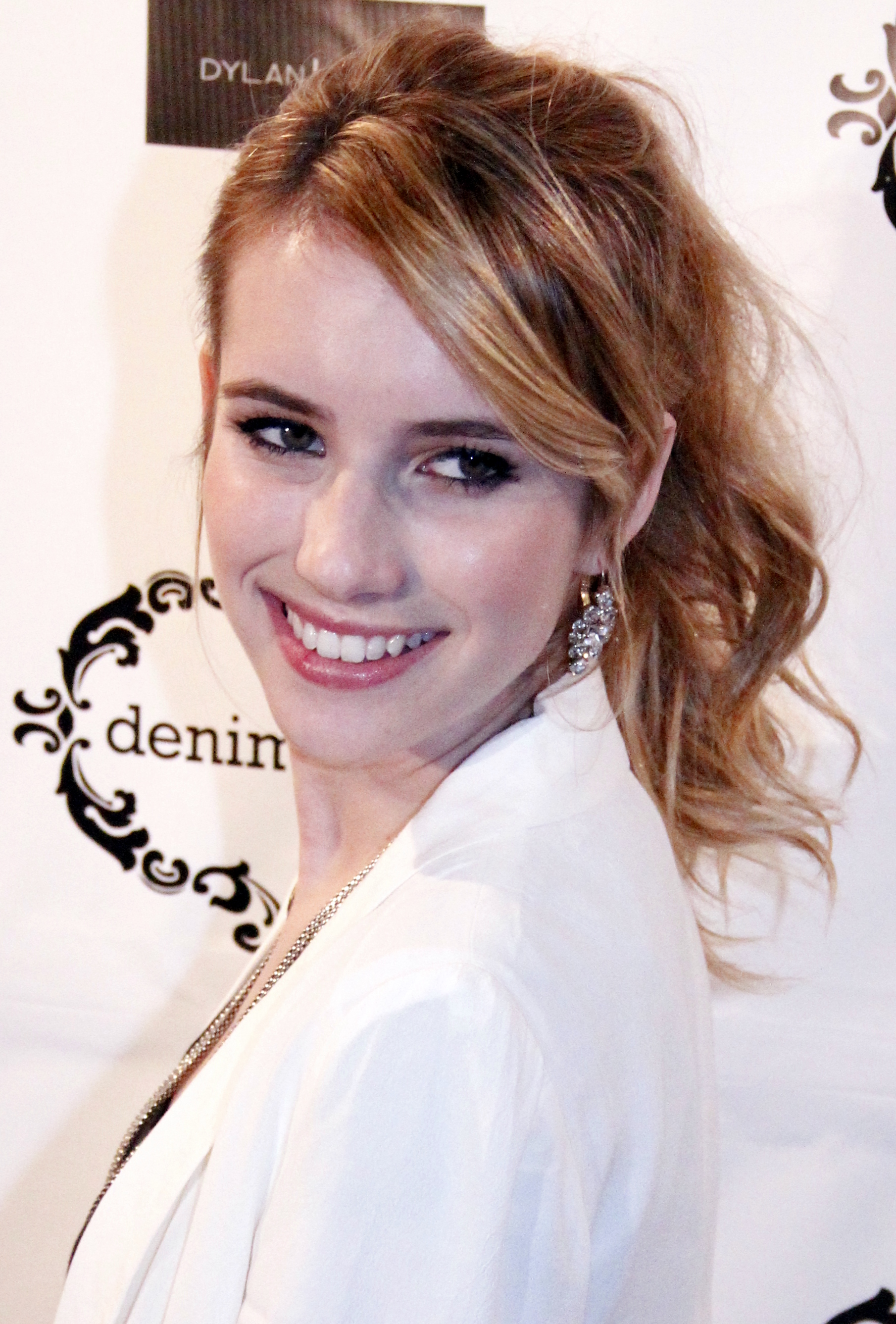
Emma Roberts' performance as Jill was praised by critics.

Jill Roberts has been considered one of the franchise's most notable Ghostface killers, alongside Billy Loomis and Stu Macher from Scream (1996). IGN placed her second in their ranking, with Eric Goldman discussing her reveal, mentioning her line "I don't need friends, I need fans!" and describing how she framed others while making herself appear as the victim. Trace Thurman of Bloody Disgusting called Jill one of the franchise's best killers, and her motive (to simply be famous) is brilliant.

Catherine Delgado of ComicBook.com described Jill as a "full package" villain due to her intelligence, cruelty, and strategic thinking. Zofia Wijaszka of Nerdist noted Jill brings a fresh and unexpected element that stands out from the usual pattern.
