= Sidney Prescott =

Fictional character in the Scream franchise

- Scream character
- Neve Campbell as Sidney Prescott in Scream
- First appearance: Scream (1996)
- Created by: Kevin Williamson
- Portrayed by: Neve Campbell Others: Stab (movie-within-a-movie): Tori Spelling (Scream 2); Emily Mortimer as Angelina Tyler (Scream 3)
- Birth date: March 13, 1979

In-universe information
- Aliases: Cassandra (play role); Laura (in hiding); Angel of Death; Sidney Prescott-Evans (married name)
- Nickname: Sid
- Occupation: High school student (graduated); College student (graduated); Crisis counselor (formerly); Self-help author (currently) Coffee shop owner
- Family: Neil Prescott (father); Maureen Prescott (mother, deceased); Tatum Evans (eldest daughter, born 2009); Emma Evans (middle daughter, born 2014); Rebecca Evans (youngest daughter, born 2019)
- Spouse: Mark Evans (husband)
- Significant others: Billy Loomis (original film); Derek Feldman (second film); Detective Mark Kincaid (third film)
- Relatives: Roman Bridger (older maternal half-brother, deceased); Kate Roberts (maternal aunt, deceased); Jill Roberts (maternal cousin, deceased)
- Nationality: American
- Location: 34 Elm Street, Woodsboro, California (childhood home); Windsor College, Ohio (formerly); Monterey, California (temporarily); Pine Grove, Indiana
- Status: Alive

Sidney Prescott is a fictional character and the protagonist of the Scream franchise. The character was created by Kevin Williamson and is portrayed by Canadian actress Neve Campbell. She first appeared in Scream (1996), followed by five sequels: Scream 2 (1997), Scream 3 (2000), Scream 4 (2011), Scream (2022), and Scream 7 (2026). With the exception of Scream VI (2023), in which she is only mentioned, her character had appeared in each successive film in the series, her role initially that of the victim but growing into a heroine where she personally confronts each killer and defeats them.

The character appears in the Scream films as the target of a series of killers who adopt the Ghostface persona, a ghost mask and black cloak, to pursue her. In each film, the Ghostface killers often murder people close to Sidney and taunt her by phone with threats and intimate knowledge of her life or the murder of her mother, leading to a final confrontation where the true killer is revealed. The killers that target Sidney have varying motivations ranging from revenge in Scream, Scream 2, and Scream 3 to the fame that will come from killing her in Scream 4, due to the fame she herself has obtained as a survivor of the murder spree in the original 3 films. She first becomes the focus of her boyfriend Billy Loomis (Skeet Ulrich) and his friend Stu Macher (Matthew Lillard), Billy seeking revenge for his mother's abandonment following his father's affair with Sidney's mother, Maureen Prescott (Lynn McRee). Scream 3 later reveals that Billy learned of this affair through Roman Bridger (Scott Foley), Sidney's half-brother, himself seeking revenge for his abandonment and rejection by Maureen, sparking the chain of events that permeate each film.

Drew Barrymore was cast as Sidney Prescott but scheduling conflicts led to her taking a smaller role as Casey Becker, with the lead being offered instead to Campbell, who at the time was starring in the television series Party of Five. Campbell was hesitant to take another horror role after finishing work on The Craft (1996), but took the opportunity as it would be her first leading role in a feature film. Campbell reprised the role in Scream 2 and Scream 3 though her own scheduling conflicts meant she could only film for a short period of time while the third film was in production. This resulted in her character's role being reduced significantly from prior installments and focus was shifted onto the series' other lead characters, Gale Weathers (Courteney Cox) and Dewey Riley (David Arquette). Campbell initially refused requests to return for Scream 4, with scripts written with her character's absence in mind, but ultimately agreed to return.

The character is depicted as an intelligent, resourceful young woman who gradually becomes stronger over the course of the series as she attempts to overcome the threats and deaths around her. Neve Campbell's role as Sidney Prescott has received significant critical praise throughout the series, earning her the title of scream queen in the 1990s, and won her the Saturn Award for Best Actress in 1997 for Scream and the MTV Award for Best Female Performance in 1998 for her role in Scream 2.

== Appearances ==
Sidney Prescott first appeared in the 1996 film Scream as a teenager attending the fictional Woodsboro High School. After a series of brutal murders occur on the anniversary of her mother's death, the killer begins targeting Sidney herself with attacks and taunting phone calls. She has appeared in the first five and the seventh film in all of the seven Scream films to date and is mentioned in the sixth.

=== Films ===
Sidney Prescott's first cinematic appearance was in the film Scream (1996) as a 17-year-old high school senior in the fictional town of Woodsboro, California. During a spree of grisly murders, she begins to receive taunting and threatening phone calls from Ghostface, who claims to have knowledge of the brutal rape and murder of Maureen Prescott (Lynn McRee), Sidney's mother, which occurred one year prior to the events of the film, a murder that is blamed on Cotton Weary (Liev Schreiber). Suspicion falls on several characters before her boyfriend Billy Loomis (Skeet Ulrich) and his friend Stu Macher (Matthew Lillard) are revealed to both be the killers. Billy states his motivation as revenge following his mother abandoning him over his father's affair with Maureen. With help from Gale Weathers (Courteney Cox), Sidney is able to fight back against Stu and Billy, even using the killer's own tricks against them, and manages to kill them both and survive the events of the film.

Scream 2 (1997) picks up two (Note: The film was released less than a year after the previous film, but takes place two years later according to the film's dialogue.) years later. In her second appearance, Sidney is a student at the fictional Windsor College where a copycat series of Ghostface murders occur. The killers again taunt 19-year-old Sidney and murder her friends including fellow Woodsboro survivor, Randy Meeks before her friend Mickey (Timothy Olyphant) reveals himself as the killer and murders her new boyfriend, Derek (Jerry O'Connell), in front of her. Mickey states his motivation as the infamy that will come from his exploits including the murder of Sidney. He is the accomplice to Mrs. Loomis (Laurie Metcalf), seeking revenge against Sidney for the death of her son Billy. Mrs. Loomis also admits to Sidney on how she killed Randy Meeks for badmouthing her son Billy. However, Mrs. Loomis betrays and seemingly kills Mickey, intending to disappear without trace after killing Sidney, but before she can enact her plan, Cotton intervenes and shoots her, saving Sidney. Then Mickey jumps up to do one last scare, and Sidney and Gale shoot him multiple times, finally killing him. Sidney then shoots Mrs. Loomis in the head just in case.

The third appearance of Sidney occurs in Scream 3 (2000), set two years after the events of Scream 2. Another murder spree begins in Hollywood, with the killer leaving photos of a young Maureen Prescott at the crime scenes. Sidney, now a reclusive crisis counselor for women, has been in hiding following the events of Scream and Scream 2 but is drawn to the set of Stab 3, the film within a film based on Sidney and her experiences, after the new Ghostface discovers her location. Ghostface claims responsibility for the murder of Maureen Prescott and is unmasked as the thirty-year-old director of Stab 3, Roman Bridger, Sidney's previously unknown half-brother. Roman reveals that their mother was gang raped and impregnated with him during a two-year period where she moved to Hollywood to become an actress, before she met Sidney's father, Neil Prescott (Lawrence Hecht). After being given up for adoption, an adult Roman sought her out over four years ago, only for her to reject him. Roman began stalking Maureen, filming her adulterous liaisons with other men, including the father of Billy Loomis, and used this footage to convince Billy to murder Maureen, unknowingly setting in motion the events of Scream and Scream 2. Sidney denounces Roman for his actions and manages to outwit and defeat him after a vicious fight, while Dewey Riley (David Arquette) ultimately shoots and kills Roman, and finally moves on with her life.

Sidney's fourth appearance is in Scream 4 (2011), set eleven (Note: The sequel reveals it occurs in its release year.) years after the events of Scream 3. After returning to the town of Woodsboro to publicize her new book, Out of Darkness—a self-help book about overcoming the events of her life—new Ghostface killings begin in the town and evidence is left in Sidney's car. Becoming a suspect in the murders, the 32-year-old survivor stays in town with her young teenage cousin Jill Roberts (Emma Roberts) and maternal aunt Kate (Mary McDonnell), but the family becomes embroiled in the Ghostface murder spree. Sidney tries to rescue Jill, who is staying at her best friend, Kirby Reed (Hayden Panettiere)'s house for an afterparty, but is attacked only to discover that Jill herself is the killer. Jill's accomplice is her secret boyfriend, Charlie Walker (Rory Culkin), having left Kirby to bleed out. Envious of her cousin's fame, Jill explains how she has remade and outdone the events of Billy and Stu's murder spree to make herself the Sidney of a "new generation" with all the associated fame, including the act of filming her own killings. Jill betrays and kills Charlie, and stabs Sidney, before brutalizing herself to appear as the "sole survivor", but after arriving at the hospital, she discovers Sidney has narrowly survived, having received treatment in the ICU. When Jill attempts to finally kill her cousin, Sidney manages to outsmart her deranged cousin and eventually shoot her in the heart, killing her, while declaring that Jill forgot the first rule of horror remakes, which was never to mess with the original.

Sidney features again in the fifth film, simply titled Scream (2022). Set twenty-five years after the conclusion of the original film, Sidney is a 42-year-old married mother of three. She is revealed to have returned to her life away from Woodsboro and is now married with kids. She is phoned by Dewey and warned to stay away from Woodsboro following the return of Ghostface yet again—now targeting relatives of Billy Loomis and Stu Macher. Despite this, she returns to her hometown after hearing about Dewey’s murder, and consoles Gale in the hospital. Billy's daughter Sam Carpenter (Melissa Barrera) rejects their offer for help to bring down the killer once and for all, but a skeptical Sidney nonetheless places a tracking device on the car of Sam's boyfriend Richie Kirsch (Jack Quaid), leading her and Gale to the former home of Stu, now housed by Amber Freeman (Mikey Madison). They are met by a distressed Amber who reveals herself as one of the killers after an unsuccessful attempt to disguise herself as a stab victim. Sidney enters the house alone to find Amber and is taunted by the other killer, though she isn't fazed at all by the taunting phone call and hangs up on him; the other killer is later revealed to be Richie. Following a confrontation with the killers, Sidney is stabbed by Amber. However, with the help of an injured Gale, the pair subdue and light Amber on fire, before she is shot in the head by Tara (Jenna Ortega), Sam's teenage half-sister. After Sam kills Richie, Sidney provides mental reassurance for her, as Sidney and Gale wait for the ambulance transportation to the hospital for her injuries.

Sidney Prescott (now Sidney Prescott-Evans) returns in Scream 7 (2026), she now lives in the small town of Pine Grove with her husband Mark and daughter Tatum. When "Stu"—who she killed in 1996—suddenly contacts her via video message, she realizes that she needs to protect both herself and her family in a final confrontation with the Ghostface killer. After interviewing Gale in order to draw out the AI "Stu", Tatum is kidnapped by Ghostface. Sidney confronts the killers at her home, learning that they are her neighbor Jessica (Anna Camp) and mental hospital supervisor Marco (Ethan Embry). She learns that Jessica masterminded the spree as she was absent during the New York killings. Sidney is able to kill Marco with a gunshot to the head and fights Jessica, gaining the upper hand before finishing her off with Tatum's help.

=== Other appearances ===
Sidney does not appear in Scream VI (2023), which features new Ghostface killings in New York; Gale explicitly states that Sidney and her family, who live somewhere else, have gone into hiding in response to the killings. Later, Ghostface stabs Gale several times before running away after being interrupted by Sam and Tara. Before Gale passes out, she asks Sam and Tara to tell Sidney that Ghostface never got her.

== Character overview ==
=== Personality ===
In a 2022 interview promoting the fifth Scream film, Campbell described Sidney as a symbol of strength and a person who refuses to be a victim. When asked about Sidney's cultural impact, she inferred that the character offered significant meaning to fans. She identified the fans who related to Sidney as being people who felt "misunderstood" and "shut down some way in their life [and] had to push a glass ceiling", or been subjected to bullying. She expressed appreciation for the character's role as a symbol of resilience and hope for anyone who struggles with bullying, especially in their youth and that her actions in the films give fans and audience goers the "confidence that they can overcome".

Like with Dawson's Creek, Sidney's character was partly rooted in writer Kevin Williamson's own experiences. Referring to her trust issues, Williamson in a 2021 interview stated, “One of the things I’ve wrestled with is trust, and Sidney trusted no one,” he explains. “Did she really know her mother? Is her boyfriend who he says he is? In the end she wasn’t even trusting herself.” He further commented on an LGBT allegory for the character, stating the final girl trope spoke to Williamson's own sexuality. He stated, “As a gay kid, I related to the final girl and to her struggle because it’s what one has to do to survive as a young gay kid, too. You’re watching this girl survive the night and survive the trauma she’s enduring. Subconsciously, I think the Scream movies are coded in gay survival.”

=== Writing ===
Born in 1979, Sidney grows up an only child, though Scream 3 depicts a revelation that she is actually the secondborn child of Maureen Prescott (née Roberts) following Roman Bridger (Scott Foley) nine years prior. Sidney's residence in the fictional town of Woodsboro is known as 34 Elm Street, a nod to Scream director Wes Craven's previously directed horror film A Nightmare on Elm Street (1984).

The name of Sidney's childhood home—34 Elm—was given dialogue and visual confirmation in the fifth film, Scream (2022); co-director Matt Bettinelli-Olpin stated that the first reference to this is Tara Carpenter (Jenna Ortega)'s namecalling the address when referring to the Stab movie-within-a-movie version of the character (portrayed by Tori Spelling) in Scream 2), and later an additional scene in the fifth film depicts two characters driving down by the block as they enter Woodsboro. Originally, a scene scripted by Williamson and filmed by Craven in the original 1996 film cut this reference due to time constraints. In the cut scene, Sidney is shown typing out the address in writing during her distress call to the online 911 system.

The third film, penned by Ehren Kruger introduces a future, long-term romance character for Sidney, a homicide detective named Mark Kincaid (portrayed by Patrick Dempsey). He narrowly survives the third act saving Sidney from being stabbed after serving as a red herring in the film. While initially intended to be brought back for Scream 4, scheduling conflicts prevented this, and thus the Sidney character was single in the film. In a 2012 interview, Campbell referred to the relationship as "sort of pseudo-love interests" after working with Dempsey again. In the fifth film, Sidney's husband also has the name Mark, and it was assumed to be the character portrayed by Dempsey two films prior. This was confirmed by Bettinelli-Olpin in a January 2022 interview. Campbell admitted to being unaware that the husband named Mark was actually Dempsey's character.

The fifth film reveals Sidney became a mother of three children between the events of the fourth and fifth films, set ten years apart. Her children with Dempsey's character include a newborn or toddler in a baby stroller, as well as two school-aged daughters that Sidney plans to take to school after she goes for an exercise run. In 2022, the directors released the first draft written on March 2, 2020, six months before filming began, which describes the two daughters being aged six- and eight-years old. In the first draft, Mark and the children make an appearance. Her third child, however, is absent from this first draft. In the seventh film, a new character was introduced Mark Evans (portrayed by Joel McHale) as a replacement of Mark Kincaid and the husband of Sidney. Also, Sidney's daughter Tatum Evans (Isabel May), named after the original film's character Tatum Riley.

=== Casting ===
The role of Sidney Prescott was initially given to actress Drew Barrymore after Barrymore herself approached the production, having read the script, to request the role and was signed to the film before a director had even been found. Wes Craven, after being hired as director, commented that he was able to have bigger actors in the film than his budget allowed because of Barrymore's desire to be involved, which he believed helped attract other big names to the production. While early development on the film took place, however, Barrymore's schedule commitments meant she was no longer able to remain in the demanding leading role, but still wishing to take part she volunteered to play the smaller role of Casey Becker, who dies early in the film, with her scene being filmed in five days. Following Barrymore's abdication of the role, actresses Melissa Joan Hart, Alicia Witt and Brittany Murphy auditioned for the part. The production also offered the role to Reese Witherspoon although she ultimately never auditioned. Molly Ringwald and Tori Spelling were also considered for the role. It was Canadian actress Neve Campbell who was given the lead of Sidney Prescott after Craven saw her in the television series Party of Five, believing she could best embody a character who was "innocent" but also able to handle herself while dealing with the demanding physicality and emotions of the role. Campbell herself was reluctant to undertake a role in another horror film so soon after taking part in The Craft (1996), but agreed to Scream as it would be her first leading role and she "adored" the character saying "She's a fantastic character for any kind of movie." Campbell and her on-screen boyfriend Skeet Ulrich had previously starred together in The Craft which they believed helped make their performance of the relationship between Sidney and Ulrich's character, Billy Loomis, more natural.

On how she approached the leading role in the series, Campbell stated:

I remember feeling insecure on the first film, everybody around me was being goofy and funny and had all these great one-liners, and I seemed so stoic in some ways. But I came to realize that if the audience couldn't see the movie through my eyes, then they wouldn't see me at all. They weren't going to feel it and weren't going to care. So it was very important for me to remain reality-based within the film, because there had to be some source of reality for it to be good. It was the same thing on the sequel.

Kevin Williamson had submitted treatments for two possible sequels to Scream before the film was even released and so Campbell had been contracted for Scream 2 when she signed on to the original film as she played the only character guaranteed to survive the film. However, scheduling became an issue for Campbell and the production as, at the time, she was still starring in Party of Five.

For Scream 3, Craven insisted that convincing Campbell and the other principal cast to return was not a problem, but scheduling Campbell's availability with the film's production again became an issue, with Campbell starring not only in Party of Five but three other feature films. Her availability was limited enough that she was only available for 20 days of filming which resulted in a significantly reduced role for her character and a shift in focus to Cox and Arquette's characters of Gale Weathers and Dewey Riley respectively.

When production of Scream 4 was announced, nearly ten years after the last installment of the series, Campbell initially refused offers to reprise her role as Sidney, forcing early script drafts to be written in consideration of her absence while again shifting focus on to Cox and Arquette's roles. However, by September 2009, Campbell was confirmed as reprising her role in the film. Early versions of Williamson's Scream 4 script involved Campbell's character being attacked in the opening, a key point of contention for Bob Weinstein, head of Scream developer Dimension Films, who had it removed.

In September 2020, it was confirmed that Campbell would be reprising her role as Sidney Prescott for the fifth Scream film, directed by Matt Bettinelli-Olpin and Tyler Gillett. She was initially "apprehensive" and hesitant to take the role given the death of Wes Craven; however, she was convinced to join once "the new directors came to me with this beautiful letter saying that they've become directors and love film because of these films, and because of Wes, and they really want to be true to his story and his journey with these films, so I was really happy to hear that." The film was released on January 14, 2022, and earned widespread acclaim. Campbell was lauded for her performance once more, and she was particularly praised for her "fresh" take on the role of Prescott. The Hollywood Reporter wrote that "... it's a pleasure to see Campbell again in fine form as Sidney, striding back into Woodsboro to take care of unfinished business." Elle magazine named her the "Reigning Queen of Scream" and stated that "Sidney might not have that impact on people were it not for Campbell's portrayal, rife with vulnerability, intelligence, and a palatable dose of humor."

On June 6, 2022, Campbell stated she would not be returning for Scream VI after contract and salary negotiations had stalled with Paramount Pictures; she stated, "As a woman I have had to work extremely hard in my career to establish my value, especially when it comes to Scream. I felt the offer that was presented to me did not equate to the value I have brought to the franchise." Campbell expanded on her statement a few weeks later, saying she could not bear "walking on set and feeling undervalued" and that the offer would have been different had she been a man.

== Reception ==
On her character of Sidney Prescott, Neve Campbell spoke positively, saying she "adored" the character and "She's a fantastic character for any kind of movie." In 1997, the Scream role won Campbell the Saturn Award for Best Actress and an MTV Movie Award for Best Female Performance nomination. The following year, she went on to win the 1998 Best Female Performance for Scream 2 and received a second Best Actress nomination from the Saturn Awards, losing to Jodie Foster for Contact (1997). She received a third and final Best Female Performance nomination from MTV in 2000 for the character in Scream 3 but lost to fellow Scream alum Sarah Michelle Gellar for Cruel Intentions (1999).

John Muir, author of Wes Craven: The Art of Horror, praised the development of Sidney Prescott in Scream 2 labeling her character, amongst others, "beloved".

Roger Ebert, heavily critical of the cast and film of Scream 3, singled out Campbell's role for praise saying "The camera loves her. She could become a really big star and then giggle at clips from this film at her AFI tribute". Harry Knowles of Ain't It Cool News was considerably less complimentary of Campbell, saying "She adds ZERO coolness. Zero talent. And Zero charisma to [Scream 3]."

Bryan Enk and Adam Swiderski of UGO ranked Neve Campbell as the 8th greatest Scream Queen for her role as Sidney Prescott, saying "in the 1990s, Neve was pretty much the number-one scream queen around."

In its review of the fifth film, Elle magazine said that "Sidney might not have that impact on people were it not for Campbell's portrayal, rife with vulnerability, intelligence, and a palatable dose of humor."

== See also ==
- Laurie Strode
- Nancy Thompson (A Nightmare on Elm Street)
- Final girl
