= Lynn McRee =

American actress (born 1952)

- Born: May 31, 1952 (age 73); New York, United States
- Occupation: Actress
- Years active: 1989–2010

Lynn McRee (born May 31, 1952) is an American actress known for her role as Maureen Prescott in the Scream film series.

== Filmography ==
Year	Title	Role	Note	Ref(s)
1989	Dragon Fight	Air Hostess		
1989	Witchtrap	Q.T. Secretary		
1996	Scream	Maureen Roberts / Prescott	Uncredited role (photos only)	
1997	Scream 2	Maureen Roberts / Prescott	Uncredited role (photos only)	
2000	Scream 3	Maureen Roberts / Prescott		
2008	Milk	Moscone's Secretary		
2010	The Violent Kind	Linda		
