= Scream 3 =

2000 American slasher film

- Theatrical release poster
- Directed by: Wes Craven
- Written by: Ehren Kruger
- Based on: Characters by Kevin Williamson
- Produced by: Cathy Konrad; Kevin Williamson; Marianne Maddalena
- Starring: David Arquette; Neve Campbell; Courteney Cox Arquette; Patrick Dempsey; Scott Foley; Lance Henriksen; Matt Keeslar; Jenny McCarthy; Emily Mortimer; Parker Posey; Deon Richmond; Patrick Warburton
- Cinematography: Peter Deming
- Edited by: Patrick Lussier
- Music by: Marco Beltrami
- Production companies: Konrad Pictures; Craven/Maddalena Films
- Distributed by: Dimension Films
- Release dates: February 3, 2000 (Westwood); February 4, 2000 (United States)
- Running time: 117 minutes
- Country: United States
- Language: English
- Budget: $40 million
- Box office: $162 million

Scream 3 is a 2000 American slasher film directed by Wes Craven and written by Ehren Kruger. It stars David Arquette, Neve Campbell, Courteney Cox Arquette, Parker Posey, Patrick Dempsey, Scott Foley, Lance Henriksen, Matt Keeslar, Jenny McCarthy, Emily Mortimer, Deon Richmond, and Patrick Warburton. It is a sequel to Scream 2 (1997) and the third installment in the Scream film series. The film's story follows Sidney Prescott (Campbell), who has gone into self-imposed isolation following the events of the previous two films but is drawn to Hollywood after a new Ghostface begins killing the cast of the film within a film Stab 3. Scream 3 combines the violence of the slasher genre with comedy and "whodunit" mystery, while satirizing the cliché of film trilogies. Unlike the previous Scream films, there was an increased emphasis on comedic elements in this installment; the violence and horror were reduced in response to increased public scrutiny about violence in media, following the Columbine High School massacre.

Scream (1996) screenwriter Kevin Williamson provided a five-page outline for two sequels to Scream when auctioning his original script, hoping to entice bidders with the potential of buying a franchise. Williamson's commitments to other projects meant he was unable to develop a complete script for Scream 3, so writing duties were undertaken by Kruger, who discarded many of Williamson's notes. Craven and Marco Beltrami returned to direct and score the film, respectively. Production was troubled, including script rewrites, occasions when pages were only ready on the day of filming, and scheduling difficulties with the main cast. Principal photography took place from July to September 1999, and the ending was re-filmed in January 2000.

Scream 3 premiered on February 3, 2000, in Westwood, Los Angeles, and was theatrically released by Dimension Films the following day, grossing $162 million worldwide on a budget of $40 million. The film received mixed reviews but has been reappraised in recent years in the wake of the MeToo movement. Scream 3 was originally intended to be the final installment of the series until the franchise was revived with a sequel, Scream 4, released on April 15, 2011.

== Plot ==
Cotton Weary, now a successful talk show host, is contacted by Ghostface, who demands to know the whereabouts of Sidney Prescott. When Cotton refuses to cooperate, Ghostface murders him and his girlfriend Christine. Detective Mark Kincaid contacts Gale Weathers to discuss Cotton's murder, prompting her to travel to Hollywood. She finds Dewey Riley working as an adviser on the set of Stab 3: Return to Woodsboro, the third film in the series based on the Ghostface murders where he is now dating Jennifer Jolie who plays Gale in Stab 3.

Ghostface kills Stab 3 actress Sarah Darling, halting the film's production to the frustration of director Roman Bridger. The remaining cast, along with Dewey and Gale, gather at Jennifer's home, where Ghostface stabs Jennifer's bodyguard to death and causes a gas explosion, killing co-star Tom Prinze, who plays Dewey.

Elsewhere, Sidney is living in seclusion under an alias, fearing another killer may strike, and works as a crisis counselor for an abused women's hotline. Having uncovered her location, the killer begins taunting Sidney using a voice changer to sound like her deceased mother Maureen Prescott. Sidney travels to Hollywood, realizing she is no longer safe. Gale and Jennifer learn that Maureen briefly worked as an actress in the 1970s under the stage name "Rina Reynolds" and had been raped at a party held by Stab 3 producer John Milton.

Martha Meeks, the sister of Sidney's murdered friend Randy, (Note: As depicted in Scream 2 (1997)) visits Sidney and the others to deliver a videotape that Randy made before his death. Randy posthumously warns them the rules of a horror film do not apply in the third film of a trilogy and that any of them could die. Sidney is later attacked by Ghostface on the Stab 3 set, forcing the police to hold her for protection.

Dewey, Gale, Jennifer, and the remaining cast, Angelina Tyler, who plays Sidney Prescott, and Tyson Fox who plays Rickey, attend a birthday party for Roman at Milton's mansion. While exploring the house, Gale and Jennifer find Roman apparently dead. Ghostface then attacks the group, killing Angelina, Tyson, and Jennifer while taking Gale and Dewey hostage. Ghostface contacts Sidney, and she travels to the mansion. Kincaid follows but is knocked unconscious by Ghostface. Sidney is lured to a secret screening room where Ghostface appears and reveals himself to be Roman, having faked his death.

Roman explains that he is Sidney's half-brother and the product of Maureen's sexual assault. Four years prior, he tracked Maureen down, only for her to reject him. Roman began stalking her and filming the men she philandered with. He showed Billy Loomis footage of his father with Maureen, setting off the string of murders in Woodsboro. (Note: As depicted in Scream (1996)) When he discovered the fame Sidney attracted due to those events, Roman snapped and lured her out of hiding, planning to kill her and frame her for his murders. After Roman reveals a bound Milton and slits his throat, Sidney furiously denounces his explanation as nothing more than deflection to hide his selfish motivations. Roman suffers a mental breakdown and attacks, and after a ferocious fight, Sidney ultimately outsmarts Roman and repeatedly stabs him. As Dewey and Gale arrive, Roman rises and tries to attack them once more but is finally killed when Dewey shoots him in the head.

Later at Sidney's house, Dewey proposes to Gale, who accepts. Sidney returns from a walk and leaves her previously alarmed front gates open. As she joins Gale, Dewey and Kincaid to watch a movie, a wind blows her front door open, but she ignores it.

== Cast ==
- David Arquette as Dewey Riley, a technical advisor for Stab 3 who attempts to solve the recent murders
- Neve Campbell as Sidney Prescott, a crisis counselor who is living in hiding and is targeted by another masked killer
- Courteney Cox Arquette as Gale Weathers, a successful author and news anchor
- Patrick Dempsey as Mark Kincaid
- Scott Foley as Roman Bridger, the director of Stab 3
- Lance Henriksen as John Milton
- Matt Keeslar as Tom Prinze
- Jenny McCarthy as Sarah Darling
- Emily Mortimer as Angelina Tyler
- Parker Posey as Jennifer Jolie
- Deon Richmond as Tyson Fox
- Liev Schreiber as Cotton Weary
- Kelly Rutherford as Christine Hamilton
- Patrick Warburton as Steven Stone
- Roger L. Jackson as the voice of Ghostface
- Lynn McRee as Maureen Prescott
- Josh Pais as Detective Wallace
- Heather Matarazzo as Martha Meeks
- Jamie Kennedy as Randy Meeks
- Jason Mewes and Kevin Smith as Jay and Silent Bob
- Carrie Fisher as Bianca Burnette

== Production ==
=== Development ===
Scream 3 was released over two years after Scream 2, with a budget of $40 million, a significant increase over the budgets of Scream at $15 million and Scream 2 at $24 million. Williamson's involvement had been contracted while selling his Scream script, to which he had attached two five-page outlines for potential sequels, which would become Scream 2 and Scream 3, hoping to entice buyers with the prospect of purchasing a franchise rather than a single script. Craven too had been contracted for two potential sequels following a successful test screening of Scream and he returned to direct the third installment. Shortly before production began on the film, Eric Harris and Dylan Klebold killed 12 students, a teacher, and themselves at their school, in what became known as the Columbine High School massacre. In the aftermath of the incident, many parties began looking for rationales for their actions and this led to an increased scrutiny on the role of the media in society, including video games and film, and the influence it could have on an audience. With the production of Scream 3 not yet underway, there were considerations about whether the film should be made at that time, aware of the potential for negative attention but the studio decided to press forward, albeit with changes. The studio remained much more apprehensive concerning violence and gore in Scream 3 than with previous installments, pressing for a greater emphasis on the series' satiric humor while scaling back on the violence. At one point in the production, the studio went as far as demanding that the film feature no blood or on-screen violence at all, a drastic departure for the series, but Craven directly intervened. According to Kruger, "[Craven ...] said 'Be serious, guys. Either we make a Scream movie or we make a movie and call it something else. But if it's a Scream movie, it's going to have certain standards.'"

=== Writing ===
Bob and Harvey Weinstein approached Williamson in early 1999 to pursue a full script for a third installment to the Scream franchise, Scream 3. However, following his successes with the Scream series and other projects such as I Know What You Did Last Summer, Williamson had become involved in multiple projects including the development of the short-lived TV series Wasteland and directing his self-penned film Teaching Mrs. Tingle (1999) which Williamson had written prior to Scream and which had languished in development hell since. Unable to develop a full script for the production, Williamson instead wrote a 20–30 page draft outline for the film that involved the return of Ghostface to the fictional town of Woodsboro where the "Stab" series, a fictional series of films within a film that exist within the Scream universe and are based on the events of Scream, would be filmed. The Weinsteins hired Arlington Road scribe Ehren Kruger to replace Williamson and helm writing duties, developing a script based on Williamson's notes.

The environment for Scream 3's development had become more complicated than with previous films. There was increased scrutiny on the effects of violence in media and the effect it could have on the public in the aftermath of the Columbine High School massacre which occurred shortly before production would begin on the film. In addition, since the release of the original Scream films, various acts of violence had taken place which had gained notoriety and media attention when they were linked to, or blamed on, the films. Eager to avoid further criticism or connection to such incidents, Williamson's notes were largely discarded as the studio insisted that the script should focus on the comedic elements of the series while significantly reducing the violence. The setting of the film was changed from Woodsboro to Hollywood upon which Kruger commented that he believed the characters should be moving to "bigger" places from high school, to college, to the city of Hollywood. Behind the scenes however, the move away from Woodsboro was mandated as it was considered that a film containing violent acts of murder in and around the small town of Woodsboro and the associated school would attract significant negative criticism and attention that could be detrimental to the production and studio, with the film set for release less than a year following the Columbine incident.

Kruger agreed to develop the script for Scream 3 primarily to work with Craven and the executives under Miramax; he said of his decision to take on writing duties on the film:

When you're doing a rewrite script, it's never totally coming from you. It's never the same as writing an original. So often, what you look for is, "Well who am I going to be working with?" and "Who am I going to be learning from?" The [answers to those] questions give you a lot of motivation for pursuing a project like this.

To help in developing the script, Kruger read copies of Williamson's scripts for Scream and Scream 2, as well as watched the earlier films to better understand the characters and tone. In an interview, Kruger admitted that his lack of involvement with the development of the principal cast of Scream hampered his ability to portray them true to their previous characterization. Early scripts for Scream 3 had the character of Sidney Prescott much like "Linda Hamilton in Terminator 2: Judgment Day" – a more action-orientated heroine – at which point Craven would intervene and correct the script to bring the characters closer to their previous appearances. Kruger admitted that despite not receiving any writing credit, Craven had a significant hand in developing the script for Scream 3. Like Scream 2, the script for Scream 3 was subject to repeated alterations with pages sometimes completed only on the day on which they were to be filmed. Multiple scenes were rewritten to include previously absent characters or change elements of the plot when it was decided that they were not connecting with other scenes. In a 2013 interview, Williamson further detailed his original script, which would have seen the killers be a "Stab" fan club of Woodsboro kids. All the members of the club would have been involved in the killings and the final twist "of the movie was when Sidney walked into the house after Ghostface had killed everyone ... and they all rose up. None of them were actually dead and they'd planned the whole thing." Williamson later adapted this story for his 2013 TV series The Following.

=== Casting ===
Neve Campbell, Courteney Cox, David Arquette, and Liev Schreiber all returned to their roles as Sidney Prescott and news reporter Gale Weathers, Dewey Riley, and Cotton Weary, now host of a TV show, respectively for Scream 3, their characters being the only central roles to survive the events of the previous two films. In an interview, Craven stated that convincing the central cast to return to film a new Scream film was not difficult but as with Scream 2, their burgeoning fame and busy schedules made arranging their availability with the film's production period difficult. The consequence of Campbell's commitments in particular meant she was only available to film her role for 20 days, forcing the script to reduce the series' main character to a smaller role while focusing on the other characters played by Cox and Arquette. Lynn McRee finally makes a physical appearance in the series as Maureen Prescott (though only through a hallucination of Sidney), and Sidney now is a crisis counselor. Roger L. Jackson again returned to voice the antagonist Ghostface and Jamie Kennedy reprised his role as Randy Meeks in spite of the character's death in Scream 2. Negative feedback following the death of Randy had the production consider methods to have had his character survive to appear in Scream 3 including having the character's family hide him away for safety while recuperating from his injuries, but it was deemed too unbelievable and the idea was replaced with the character appearing in a minor role via a pre-recorded video message.

Many of the supporting cast played fictitious actors taking part in the film within a film Stab 3 including Emily Mortimer as Angelina Tyler, Parker Posey as Jennifer Jolie, Matt Keeslar as Tom Prinze, Jenny McCarthy as Sarah Darling, and Deon Richmond as Tyson Fox with Scott Foley as the film's director, Roman Bridger. Additional cast included Lance Henriksen as film producer John Milton, Patrick Dempsey as detective Mark Kincaid, Patrick Warburton as bodyguard Steven Stone, and Kelly Rutherford as Christine Hamilton, girlfriend to Cotton Weary. Rutherford was cast after filming had begun as the production was undergoing constant rewrites and the opening scene evolved from requiring only a female corpse to needing a live actress with whom Schreiber could interact. Shortly after being cast, Mortimer was found to lack the necessary work permit to allow her involvement in the film, requiring her to be flown to Vancouver to obtain one. Scream 3 also featured the first live on-screen appearance of Sidney Prescott's mother Maureen Prescott, played by Lynn McRee, the actress previously having represented the character in photographs during the previous films.

Lawrence Hecht and C.W. Morgan appeared in minor roles reprising their characters of Sidney's father Neil Prescott and Hank Loomis respectively. Nancy O'Dell appeared as an unnamed reporter, having previously appeared in Scream 2 and would go on to appear in Scream 4 in the same role. Scream 3 featured several cameo appearances including the fictional characters of Jay and Silent Bob from the 1994 film Clerks and sequels played by Jason Mewes and Kevin Smith, and director Roger Corman as an on-set studio executive. Carrie Fisher made a cameo in the film as former actress Bianca Burnette at the suggestion of Bob Weinstein; Fisher helped to write her character, who makes reference to having almost been cast as Princess Leia.

In a 2009 interview, Matthew Lillard, who played Stu Macher in Scream, said that he had been contracted to reprise his role in Scream 3 as the primary antagonist, having survived his apparent death, orchestrating new Ghostface attacks from prison on high school students and ultimately targeting Sidney. Following the Columbine High School massacre shortly before production began, the script was scrapped and re-written without his character and this plot to avoid development of a film which associated violence and murder with a high school setting.

=== Filming ===
Principal photography for Scream 3 began on July 6, 1999, in and around Hollywood, Los Angeles on a budget of $40 million and finished on September 29, 1999, after twelve weeks. Filming took place largely in the areas of San Fernando Valley, Macarthur Park, Beverly Hills, Hollywood Hills and Silver Lake with the isolated home of Campbell's character situated in Topanga Canyon. The opening scene involves Cotton Weary (Schreiber) driving before arriving home where he is murdered by the Ghostface character. For the driving scene, the production filmed on Hollywood Boulevard but the following scene in Cotton's apartment was changed frequently, requiring alterations to the driving scene to maintain continuity, modifying who speaks to Cotton by phone and what the conversation entailed. Unable to return to Hollywood Boulevard, the scene was reshot on a street outside of the production studio in San Fernando Valley and intermixed with footage taken on the Boulevard. The opening attack scene was filmed partially at the exterior and interior of Harper House in West Hollywood but changes were made to the scene including introducing a live girlfriend for Cotton instead of her being dead when Cotton arrives. It was later decided that the confrontation between Cotton and Ghostface, featuring Cotton physically dominating the character and attempting to escape by skylight, was unrealistic and made Ghostface appear weak and this scene was reshot. Again however, they were unable to return to Harper House to conduct filming and resorted to constructing a replica of the apartment interior to produce the necessary footage which had the Ghostface character appear more dominant and completely excised the attempted skylight escape. Cox's character is introduced during a seminar which takes place within a classroom at UCLA, a location previously used in Scream 2 to represent the fictional Windsor College. The film studio where the fictional Stab 3 is filmed is represented by the CBS Studio Center in Studio City, San Fernando Valley while scenes at the home of Posey's character were filmed in the Hollywood Hills at Runyon Ranch in Runyon Canyon Park. The finale, featuring the final attacks of the film and confrontation between the antagonist and Sidney, was filmed at the Canfield-Moreno Estate, a mansion in Silverlake.

A scene in the film involved Campbell being pursued by Ghostface through filmset replicas of locations from the original Scream including her character's home. The scene was not present in the script itself, but Craven paid to have the sets constructed, knowing he wanted to revisit the original film in some manner. After the construction of the sets, the scene was then written around the resulting areas producing the scene in the final film. The script underwent changes repeatedly as filming was conducted with pages regularly only available on the day of filming. Additionally, if the production decided to change a scene this sometimes meant refilming other scenes to maintain continuity requiring further rewrites. The production team purposely filmed large amounts of footage containing different variations of each scene based on the different script developments in order that, should the script further change, they would ideally have a scene they could use without having to film new ones at a later date, requiring them to obtain access to locations or build sets. Additionally, a three-minute scene featuring the character of Randy Meeks had over two hours of footage filmed. The script for the film was so in flux that the epilogue scene was filmed with three variants of Patrick Dempsey's character – one with him absent, one where his arm is bandaged and one with him in a normal condition – as the production were not certain what his ultimate fate would be following the finalization of the film.

=== Post-production ===
In January 2000, three months after completing principal photography for Scream 3, the ending was refilmed when it was decided to be an inadequate conclusion. Originally the ending consisted of Sidney (Campbell) easily defeating Roman (Scott Foley) which led into an early morning scene of police arriving and then into the final scene of Sidney in her home. The production considered that this amounted to essentially three endings, damaging the pacing of the film and there was also consideration that, being the concluding chapter of the trilogy, the audience needed to believe that Sidney could lose and die, something her easy victory did not achieve. To create the alternate ending, the fight scene between Sidney and Roman was extended and an addition involved Roman shooting Sidney, seemingly to death where previously she had simply hidden from the character. A major addition was the presence of the character Mark Kincaid (Patrick Dempsey), who had previously been completely absent from the finale after the production realized that his character simply disappeared from the plot and his story arc went nowhere.

As with the production of Scream, Craven encountered repeated conflicts over censorship with the MPAA regarding violence, and the director stated in an interview that the issues made him consider leaving the horror genre.

=== Music ===
Marco Beltrami returned to score Scream 3, having scored the previous two films in the series. For the film, Beltrami employed seven orchestrators to aid in scoring the extensive orchestral accompaniment featured in the film's score. He experimented with new styles of sound production by recording instruments in abnormal circumstances such as inserting objects into a piano and recording at various velocities to create a distorted, unnatural sound and modifying the results electronically. Beltrami continued to incorporate a heavy vocal orchestra throughout the score as he had with the previous films. There was consideration that Beltrami was forced to hire multiple orchestrators to complete the score to meet the film's deadline. Beltrami took inspiration from other composers for the score, again incorporating excerpts of the score to Broken Arrow by Hans Zimmer in the track "Sid Wears a Dress".

== Reception ==
Scream 3 held its premiere on February 3, 2000, at the AMC Avco theater in Westwood, Los Angeles, California and was theatrically released the following day on February 4.

=== Box office ===
The film set a record for the widest opening ever in the United States and Canada, being released on 3,467 screens.

The film grossed $34.7 million during its opening weekend, ranking number one at the US box office. It broke The Empire Strikes Back: Special Edition's record for the highest weekend debut in February. It also beat Scream 2's record for the highest weekend debut for a horror film and also for a Miramax film. It went on to gross $89 million in the United States and Canada, and $73 million in other territories, for a world lifetime gross of $162 million.

=== Critical response ===
On Rotten Tomatoes, the film holds an approval rating of 45% based on 164 reviews and an average rating of 5.3/10. The website's critical consensus reads, "Despite some surprising twists, Scream 3 sees the franchise falling back on the same old horror formulas and cliches it once hacked and slashed with postmodern abandon." On Metacritic, the film has a weighted average score of 56 out of 100, based on 32 critics, indicating "mixed or average reviews". On CinemaScore, audiences gave the film an average grade of B on an A+ to F scale.

Time Out London was particularly critical of the film, calling the film's metafiction commentary a poor imitation of Craven's own horror film Wes Craven's New Nightmare (1994). Of the characters, Roger Ebert said "[the characters] are so thin, they're transparent" but praised Campbell's appearance saying, "The camera loves her. She could become a really big star and then giggle at clips from this film at her AFI tribute."

In a positive review, the Los Angeles Times called the film, "Genuinely scary and also highly amusing", and the BBC stated that "as the conclusion to the trilogy it works more effectively than anyone had a right to expect". Variety also praised the film as the end of the Scream trilogy, saying "Aficionados will be the best able to appreciate how wittily Craven has brought down the curtain on his much-imitated, genre-reviving series" while Empire called it "satisfying" though believed the premise of the series had worn thin.

==== Post-2017 re-evaluation ====
In the wake of the scandal involving the Scream films' executive producer Harvey Weinstein, several publications noted the parallels between Weinstein's behavior and the themes of abuse featured in the film, particularly those involving Maureen Prescott, the late mother of the film series' protagonist, Sidney. In 2017, Kristen Yoonsoo Kim noted the scene in which John Milton, portrayed by Lance Henriksen, discusses taking advantage of aspiring actresses. In 2019, the film's editor, Patrick Lussier, discussed those particular themes and Wes Craven's approach to them, saying of Henriksen's character: "Wes, I think, was very interested in that character as not necessarily the villain—he certainly is a villain—but as a catalyst for the villain's motivation. He's really the spark for the events, or retconned that he is the spark for the events, in the entire series."

In 2020, Adam White wrote that the film was "an angry indictment of sexual misconduct in Hollywood, predatory men and the casting couch". He noted several instances of "transactional sex" within the film, including the characters Jennifer and Angelina both making references to having sex with filmmakers in order to secure roles in the fictional Stab film, and Carrie Fisher in a cameo role (as a lookalike of Fisher herself) who claims that the role of Princess Leia in the Star Wars franchise was won by "the one who [slept] with George Lucas". White also noted that Rose McGowan, who appeared in the first Scream film, later accused Weinstein of raping her in a hotel room a year after the film was released. McGowan revealed in 2017 that she received a $100,000 settlement as a result of this attack.

Writing for SyFy Wire, Emma Fraser commented that throughout the series, the late Maureen is "slut-shamed" and "victim-blamed". Fraser also lamented the film's lack of exploration of these themes, stating that the film "could have been a fascinating look at the crimes of this industry and the relationship horror has with sex".

=== Home media ===
Scream 3 was released in US territories on VHS and on DVD on July 4, 2000, by Buena Vista Home Entertainment (under the Dimension Home Video label). The video was later released as a bonus edition on October 24, 2000. The DVD version was only released as a collector's edition featuring deleted scenes, outtakes, bloopers, audio commentary, music videos of songs featured in the film, trailers for the film, and biographies of the cast and crew involved in the film's production. Following the release of Scream 3 as what was then the concluding chapter of the series, Collector's Editions of Scream, Scream 2, and Scream 3 were packaged in "The Ultimate Scream Collection" DVD boxset by Dimension Films on September 26, 2000, which included "Behind the Scream", a short documentary about the production of the films, outtakes, deleted scenes, screentests of actors involved in the films and other miscellaneous materials related to the series. In 2001, the DVD release of Scream 3 was nominated for a Saturn Award for Best Home Video Release, but lost to the anime film Princess Mononoke (1997), another release Dimension/Miramax were involved with.

Scream 3 remained unreleased in foreign territories including Europe and Japan until 2001 where it was simultaneously released with Scream and Scream 2 on February 26 by Buena Vista Home Entertainment. Each film contained the additional content found in the collector's edition version of their US release including deleted scenes, outtakes, theatrical trailers, music videos, and commentary from each respective film's crew. Additionally, the three films were collected together in a single pack, again released on February 26 and released as Scream Trilogy.

Scream 3 was released on the Blu-ray Disc format on March 29, 2011, alongside Scream, and Scream 2, two weeks prior to the release of Scream 4, by Lionsgate Home Entertainment, hosting the films in 1080p high definition and including audio commentary, theatrical trailers and behind-the-scenes footage for each respective film.

Paramount later included Scream 3 on a collection titled Paramount Scares, which included other horror films they owned, in addition to making Scream 3 available on their streaming service Paramount+.

The film was released on 4K Ultra HD Blu-ray on October 3, 2023, by Paramount Pictures. The film grossed $1.5 million in Blu-ray home sales.
