= Cotton Weary =

Fictional character in the Scream film series

- Scream character
- Liev Schreiber as Cotton Weary in Scream 2
- First appearance: Scream (1996)
- Last appearance: Scream 3 (2000)
- Created by: Kevin Williamson
- Portrayed by: Liev Schreiber

In-universe information
- Gender: Male
- Occupation: Talk show host
- Significant others: Christine Hamilton (girlfriend; deceased)
- Nationality: American
- Classification: Wrongfully accused murder suspect in the killing of Sidney Prescott's mother Maureen Prescott
- Status: Deceased

Cotton Weary is a fictional character in the Scream franchise, portrayed by Liev Schreiber. Cotton first appears in Scream (1996) as a man jailed for the murder of Maureen Prescott, the mother of Sidney Prescott. He is wrongly framed for the crime, and after the real killers are revealed, he is released from prison and takes part in later events related to the Ghostface murders.

Cotton reappears in Scream 2 (1997) and makes his final appearance in Scream 3 (2000). The character was created by Kevin Williamson.

== Appearances ==
=== Scream (1996) ===
Cotton Weary first appears in Scream (1996). He is mentioned throughout the film as the man convicted of the rape and murder of Maureen Prescott, the mother of Sidney Prescott. Cotton is shown briefly in television news footage during his arrest. Sidney had earlier identified him as the attacker, which led to his conviction, although the real killers are later revealed to be Billy Loomis and Stu Macher. After their deaths, it becomes clear that Cotton had been wrongly imprisoned for the crime.

=== Scream 2 (1997) ===
Cotton returns in Scream 2 (1997) after being released from prison. Hoping to restore his reputation and gain public attention, he tries to persuade Sidney to appear with him in a televised interview. Reporter Gale Weathers also attempts to stage a confrontation between the two. Sidney refuses to help him, still uneasy about their past. Sidney is confronted by the killers Mickey Altieri and Mrs. Loomis. Cotton arrives and interrupts them. Mrs. Loomis tries to convince him to kill Sidney, promising fame and money, but Cotton instead shoots Mrs. Loomis after Sidney agrees to give him the interview he wants. The killers are ultimately defeated, and Sidney later tells reporters to focus their attention on Cotton, giving him the publicity he had been seeking.

=== Scream 3 (2000) ===
In Scream 3 (2000), Cotton has become the host of a successful talk show. One night he receives a phone call from Ghostface, who demands to know Sidney's location. Cotton refuses to reveal it. Ghostface then attacks Cotton and his girlfriend Christine Hamilton at their home. After killing Christine, the killer murders Cotton when he continues to refuse to give Sidney's whereabouts. His death becomes the opening murder of the film.

== Development ==
=== Creation and characterization ===
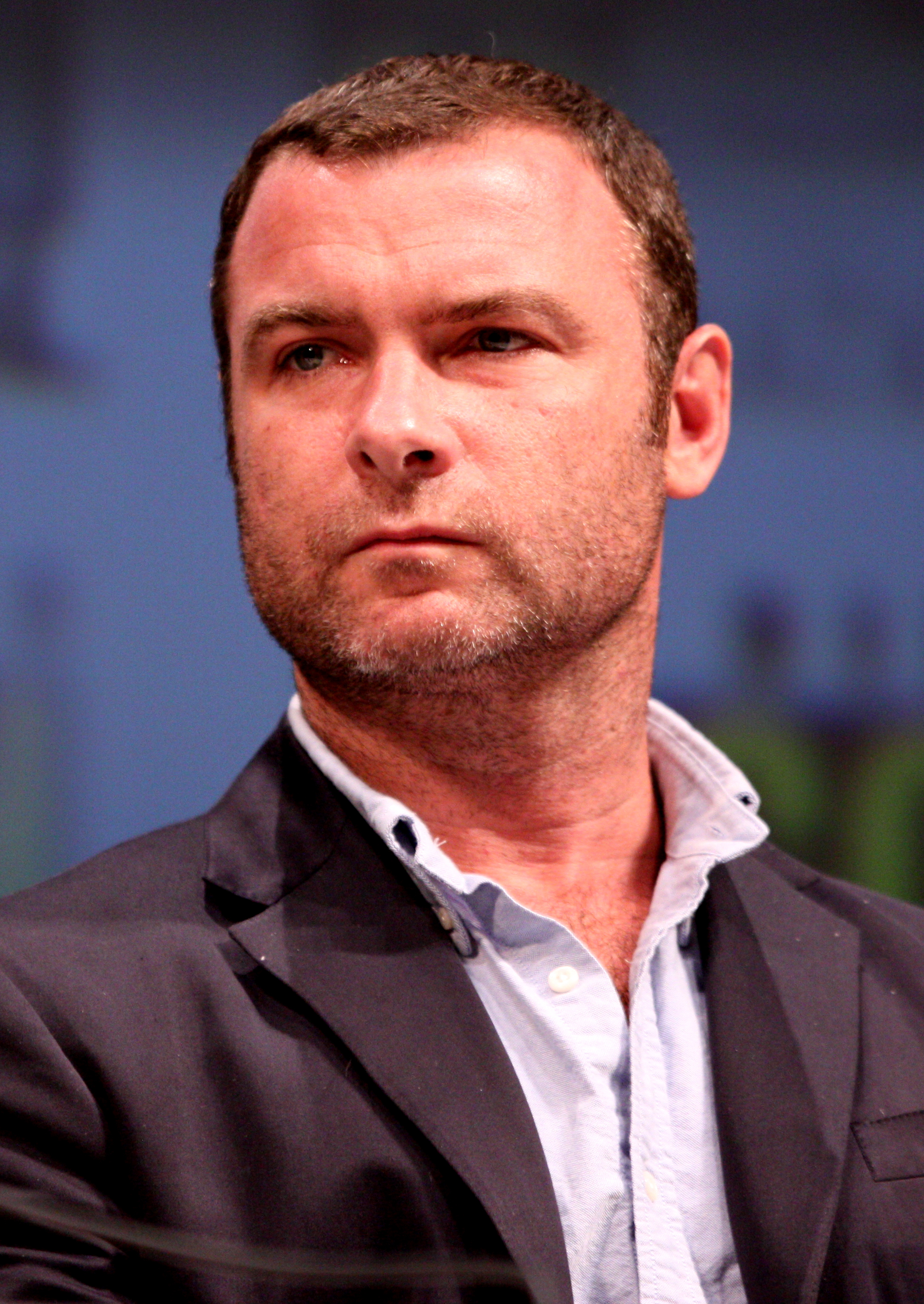
Liev Schreiber made a cameo appearance in the first film and reprised his role fully in Scream 2 and Scream 3.

Cotton Weary was created by screenwriter Kevin Williamson for the original Scream film (1996). In the first film, he appears briefly as the man wrongly convicted of murdering Maureen Prescott. The role was expanded in Scream 2 (1997), where actor Liev Schreiber received more screen time and the character became more involved in the story. During the writing of the sequel, Williamson recalled that studio executives suggested making Cotton appear more suspicious as a possible killer. Williamson and Schreiber both resisted some of those suggestions.

Cotton is portrayed as a man who often ends up in the wrong place at the wrong time. In Scream 3 (2000), he has become a minor celebrity and talk show host. He has a professional relationship with Gale Weathers, who helped prove his innocence, with his past notoriety and connection to Maureen Prescott making him a target.

=== Death in Scream 3 ===
Cotton's death in Scream 3 was partly suggested by Schreiber himself. He proposed that the character should be killed off in the cold open, following the tradition of each film in the series, except the fifth film's cold open, beginning with a shocking murder. Schreiber later said he regretted the decision and felt that he did not fully understand the long-term value of remaining in a film franchise at the time.

== Reception ==
Cotton Weary has been described as an unusual supporting character in the franchise because of his story arc, which moves from a wrongly convicted prisoner to a public figure seeking fame. Comic Book Resources noted that the character plays an important role in Scream 2, where he ultimately saves Sidney Prescott during the film's final confrontation.

Michael Busani of Collider wrote that Cotton's death in Scream 3 is notable because he is the first major returning character in the franchise to be killed in the opening scene. Trace Thurman of Bloody Disgusting also commented that the scene was memorable within the series' opening sequences. Tyler Doupe of Dread Central wrote that Cotton, having survived the first two Scream films, later hosts his own talk show, 100% Cotton, before being killed in Scream 3. Doupe described the character as "enterprising" for turning his brief notoriety into a career.
