= Mist (disambiguation) =

Mist is a weather phenomenon similar to fog.

Mist, MIST or The Mist may also refer to:

== Arts and entertainment ==
=== Fiction ===
- Mist (novel), a 1914 novel by Spanish author Miguel de Unamuno
- The Mist (novella), a 1980 horror novella by American author Stephen King
- Mist (Guardians of Ga'Hoole), featured in the fantasy book series
- Mist (comics), a supervillain of Starman comics
- Mist (valkyrie), a valkyrie in Norse mythology

=== Film and television ===
- Mist (1967 film), South Korean film
- The Mist (1980 film), the Indian thriller Moodu Pani
- Mist (1988 film), a Turkish film
- Mist: The Tale of a Sheepdog Puppy, 2006 British television film
- The Mist (film), 2007 film based on The Mist by Stephen King
- The Mist (TV series), 2017 US TV series based on the 2007 film

=== Games ===
- MIST (MUD), a public-access Multi-user Dungeon (MUD) computer game
- Mist (Legend of Legaia), a feature of the PlayStation video game

== Education ==
- Masdar Institute of Science and Technology, an ecologically focused university in Masdar City, UAE
- Mbeya Institute of Science and Technology, Tanzania
- Military Institute of Science and Technology, an engineering institute in Bangladesh
- Master of Information Science and Technology, a postgraduate degree
- Musashi International School Tokyo, Mitaka, Tokyo

== Places ==
- Mist, Oregon, an unincorporated community in Columbia County, Oregon, US
- Mist, California, the former name of the former town Bailey Flats, California, US

== Sports ==
- Mist BC, basketball club based in Miami, Florida

== Other uses ==
- Muslim Interscholastic Tournament, a tournament for high-school students in the United States, Canada and the UK
- MIST (satellite), planned Swedish satellite
- USS Mist, several United States Navy ships
- Mist (rapper) (born 1992), musician from Birmingham, UK
- Magnetosphere Ionosphere and Solar-Terrestrial group, a physical sciences community based in the U.K. associated with the Royal Astronomical Society
- Minimum intelligent signal test, a method to optimize the performance of artificial intelligence systems intended to imitate human responses
- Mists (Xenakis), 1980 piano composition

== See also ==
- Myst, a graphic adventure/puzzle video game
- Mister (disambiguation)
- Misty (disambiguation)
