= Lowry Solutions =

- Type: Private
- Industry: Computer hardware
- Founded: 1974
- Founder: Richard Lowry
- Headquarters: Brighton, Michigan, US
- Area served: United States-wide
- Key people: Mike Lowry; Owner
- Products: RFID printers/encoders, barcode printers, mobile printers, automatic label applicators, software, custom labels, ribbons and supplies
- Number of employees: 50-100

Lowry Solutions is an American software technology company. It provides RFID, barcode and wireless networking services and equipment as well as automatic label applicators and supplies. Headquartered in Brighton, Michigan, it is partnered with companies such as Zebra Technologies, Honeywell, Motion Computing, Panasonic and Paragon Labeling.

== History ==
Richard Lowry founded Lowry & Associates in 1974. The original company served as a manufacturers representatives firm that sold Intel products, holding exclusive regional rights. Some of the items in its portfolio included: single board computers, memory cards, power supplies, analog to digital I/O and Intel development systems.

Spartan Stores in Grand Rapids, MI, was Lowry's first bar code sale.At the time, Lowry & Associates was reselling Printronix printers.

Between the years 1994 and 1996, Lowry grew from a regional company to national sales coverage by acquiring 4 regional VAR companies; two of those VAR Company's also had label conversion manufacturing capability. In 1996, Lowry consolidated all manufacturing operations into their 40,000 square foot plant in White Bear Lake, Minnesota.

In 1996, Lowry began manufacturing a line of label applicators and automated print & apply systems, which is currently under the Paragon Brand name. Lowry offered its customers a choice between Zebra, Sato and Datamax print engines.

In January 2014, Lowry Computers became Lowry Solutions.

In May 2015, Lowry Solutions was awarded the AIT-V Contract. It was one of three companies provided automatic identification technology data communications, software, hardware, documentation and associated services under a $181 million indefinite-delivery/indefinite-quantity contract.
