= Mister (disambiguation) =

Mister, abbreviated as Mr., is a common English language honorific used to address men.

Mister may also refer to:

- "Mister" (song), by South Korean girl group Kara
- "Mr." (song), by Japanese duo Yoasobi
- Mister (2017 film), a Telugu film
- Mister (2027 film), an upcoming American action comedy film
- Mr. (artist) (born 1969), Japanese contemporary artist
- Mr. (band), Hong Kong pop rock band, or their 2008 EP, Mister
- MiSTer, a collaborative open source project to implement various retro video games systems on a FPGA
- A misting system, a type of evaporative cooler

== See also ==
- Mr. Mister (disambiguation)
- Meister
- Master (disambiguation)
- Mist (disambiguation)
- MR (disambiguation)
- Mista (disambiguation)
