= Xplore =

Xplore may refer to:

== Science and technology ==
- IEEE Xplore, an online database of IEEE research publications
- XploRe, a statistical software environment
- Xplore Technologies, designer, marketer and manufacturer of rugged tablet computers
- Xplore (space exploration company), a satellite manufacturer and operator
- Xplore!, a science centre in Wrexham, Wales
- Xplore, a series of PDAs by Group Sense PDA

== Other uses ==
- Xplore Dundee, a bus operator based in Dundee, Scotland

== See also ==
- Explorer (disambiguation)
- Exploration
