= MR =

MR, Mr, mr, or mR may refer to:

- Mr., an honorific title before any man's name

== Arts, entertainment, and media ==
- MR (Marina and Rainer), a 1989, one-act, multilingual opera libretto by Nikolai Korndorf
- Mr. (band), a Hong Kong pop-rock band
- Magyar Rádió, a Hungarian radio station
- Mixed reality, the merging of real and virtual worlds in digital visualisation
- Model Railroader, an American hobby magazine
- Meta Runner, an Australian web series

== Businesses and organisations ==
- Chief Maqoma Regiment, an infantry regiment of the South African Army
- Mineral Resources, Australian mining company
- Mouvement radical (Radical Movement), a French political party
- Mouvement Réformateur (Reformist Movement), a Belgian political party
- Martin Research, a defunct American computer company

== Education ==
- mr., an academic degree, equivalent to Master of Laws, meester in de rechten, in Belgium and the Netherlands
- Menntaskólinn í Reykjavík, a Gymnasium in Iceland

== Identification codes ==
- Air Mauritanie (by IATA code)
- Marathi language (by ISO 639-1)
- Martinique (World Meteorological Organization country code)
- Mauritania (ISO 3166-1 alpha-2 and FIPS 10-4 country codes)
  - .mr, the top-level Internet domain for Mauritania
- Morocco (Library of Congress MARC country code)

== Law ==
- Master of the Rolls, the President of the Court of Appeal of England and Wales, Civil Division, and Head of Civil Justice
- mr., an academic degree, equivalent to Master of Laws, meester in de rechten, in Belgium and the Netherlands

== Medicine ==
- Magnetic resonance imaging
- Mental retardation, generalised learning or intellectual disability, in now obsolete jargon
- Mineralocorticoid receptor, a human protein
- Mitral regurgitation of blood flow in the heart
- Modified release

== Science ==
- Magnetoresistance, change in electrical resistance due to a magnetic field
- Mendelian randomization, a way of using genetic information to estimate causal effects
- Merge request in software development
- Millirem, a unit of radiation dose
- Molecular replacement, a method of solving the phase problem in X-ray crystallography
- Relative molecular mass, mass of a given molecule, M_{r}

== Transport ==
- M.R. (automobile), a microcar model built in 1945
- Air Mauritanie (by IATA code)
- Midland Railway, a United Kingdom railway
- Nissan MR engine
- Rear mid-engine, rear-wheel-drive layout, an automotive layout
- Mary (vehicle registration suffix MR)

== See also ==
- Magnetic resonance (disambiguation)
- McCune–Reischauer, a romanization system for the Korean language
- Mister (disambiguation)
- Multirole combat aircraft, aircraft intended to perform different roles in combat
