= LIA-UFSCar =

The Advanced Interaction Laboratory (Portuguese: Laboratório de Interação Avançada) is a Human-Computer Interaction (HCI) research lab in the Department of Computer Science at UFSCar founded in 2003. Its mission is to research innovative information and communication technologies (ICTs) approaches for designing, developing, and using ICT aiming to overcome the challenges faced in the adoption of ICT considering social, professional, economical, political and cultural context of use.

One of LIA's main projects is Open Mind Common Sense in Brazil (OMCS-Br). The project started in 2005 in partnership with Media Lab from MIT. It is an approach for developing culture-sensitive interactive systems, which relies on using common sense knowledge for developing such systems. That is because individuals communicate with each other by assigning meaning to their messages based on their prior beliefs, attitudes, and values, i.e. based on their common sense. Previous researches developed at the Lab have shown that common sense expresses cultural knowledge. So, providing this kind of knowledge for computers is a way of allowing the development of culture-sensitive computer applications (Anacleto et al., 2006).

Main research areas:

- Natural Interactions
- Culture
- Context Awareness
- Social Networking
- Education
- Sensitive Design
- Common Sense Reasoning
- Games
- Emotions

LIA researchers objectives are on research and development of new concepts and methodologies focused on multidisciplinary issues and the creation of open source tools geared to the promotion, development and sharing of knowledge through the adoption of ICTs.
