= Mista =

Mista may refer to

== People ==
- Mista (footballer) (born 1978), Spanish footballer
- Aleksander Miśta (born 1983), Polish chess player
- Guido Mista, a side protagonist from JoJo's Bizarre Adventure: Golden Wind
- Mista Savona, reggae, dancehall and hip-hop producer
- Mista Silva, British-Ghanaian musician
- Mista Mo, host of the Canadian TV series Buzz

== Arts and entertainment ==
- Mista (band), an American R&B group featuring Bobby Valentino
  - Mista (album), the 1996 debut album by the group
- Mista (dance), a Croatian folk dance
- "Mista Mista", a song by the Fugees from their 1996 album The Score

== See also ==
- Miista, a fashion brand
- Mister (disambiguation)
