= ScholarChip =

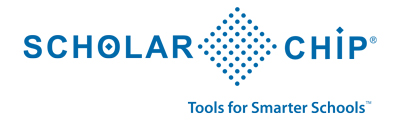
- Founded: 2000
- Founder: Dr. Maged Atiya
- Headquarters: Hicksville, New York, United States
- Website: www.scholarchip.com

ScholarChip is a company that produces multifunctional ID cards and services for contactless campus environments. Its cards are NFC-enabled and can be used to take attendance, monitor entry and exit, make payments, and monitor student activity. Dr. Maged Atiya founded ScholarChip in 2000. The company is headquartered in Hicksville, Town of Oyster Bay, New York and has additional offices in New York City, Philadelphia, Portland, and Baltimore.

== History ==
Dr. Maged Atiya founded ScholarChip in 2000. He now serves as the company's CTO and CEO.

In March 2012, ScholarChip released its first School Safety and Operations platform compatible with NFC-enabled mobile phones. The NFC technology makes it possible for the ScholarChip's ID cards to exchange data with smartphones through a contactless swipe or tap. Students can use the cards to check in when they enter their school or sign into class, just by tapping their card against an NFC-enabled phone or kiosk. Previously, these cards could only be read at permanent kiosks equipped with OMNIKEY RFID readers.

Also in 2012, ScholarChip partnered with the Philadelphia public transportation system to launch a transit payment system for students. The initiative will let students pay their transit fare via their contactless ID cards. Schools will also be able to reduce truancy by tracking student IDs with NFC and mobile apps. The system creates a real-time interface between the ID cards, the school attendance platform, and the contactless public transport readers. In 2013, ScholarChip partnered with Fairfax County Public Schools to manage visitor databases to screen for registered sex offenders. In February 2014, ScholarChip announced a partnership with Baltimore County Public Schools to provide smart ID cards for its staff and students.

In 2014, ScholarChip partnered Shuttle Computer Group to monitor student and staff school attendance. In 2016, the company formed a partnership with Zebra Technologies and ARMET Group, to create the Affordable Smart Card ID Initiative which subsidizes prices for school districts implementing smart ID cards.

== Product ==
ScholarChip offers a one-card solution for contactless campuses. Schools can also pick and choose services based on individual needs. For example, the Westbury School District on Long Island, New York uses the ScholarChip system to take school attendance for its 4,600 students.

== Awards and recognition ==
In 2012, ScholarChip was a finalist for the “Emerging Technology Solution” award from EdTech Digest. The site highlighted ScholarChip's aesthetic and modern app design and its comprehensive services.
