= Jenna Ortega =

American actress (born 2002)

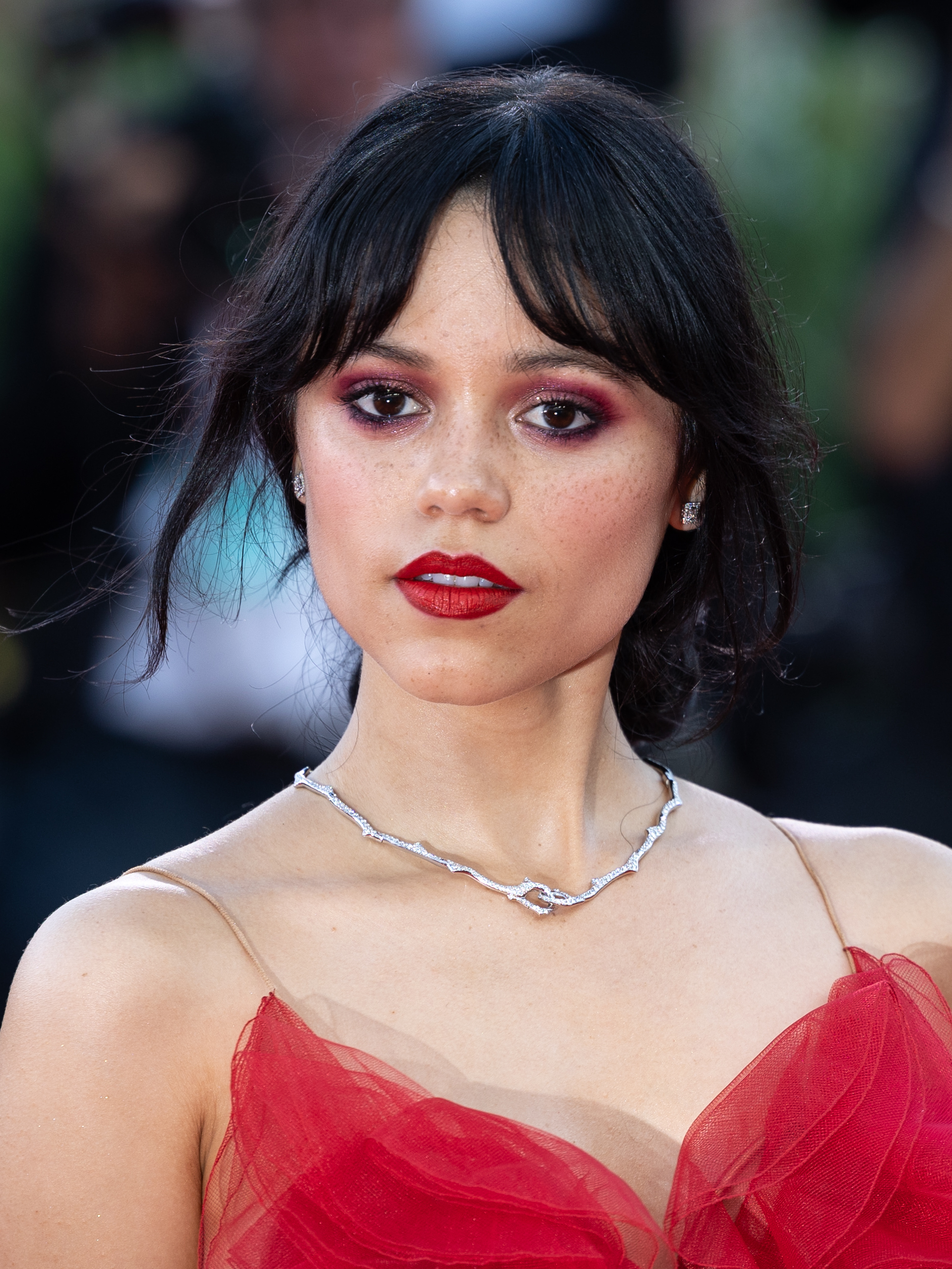
- Ortega in 2024
- Born: Jenna Marie Ortega; September 27, 2002 (age 24); Rancho Mirage, California, U.S.
- Occupation: Actress
- Years active: 2012–present

- Jenna Ortega's voice On how she made the 2022 version of Wednesday appeal to fans of the 1991 film Recorded December 2022

Jenna Marie Ortega (born September 27, 2002) is an American actress. Known for her work in horror, Ortega has been called "Gen Z's scream queen" by media publications. (Note: Attributed to multiple references:) She was featured on The Hollywood Reporter's Power 100 list in 2023 and the Forbes 30 Under 30 list in 2024.

Ortega began acting professionally at age nine, appearing in television commercials and national campaigns. She made her acting debut in the sitcom Rob (2012) and received recognition for her role as a younger version of Jane in The CW comedy-drama series Jane the Virgin (2014–2019). From 2016 to 2018, she had a leading role as Harley Diaz in the Disney Channel series Stuck in the Middle, for which she won an Imagen Award. She expanded into more mature projects afterward, playing Ellie Alves in the thriller series You (2019) and co-starring in the horror-comedy film The Babysitter: Killer Queen (2020), both for Netflix. She received praise for her performance as a traumatized high school student in the drama film The Fallout (2021).

Ortega rose to wider prominence as a scream queen after co-starring in the slasher films Scream (2022), X (2022), and Scream VI (2023). She gained international recognition and critical plaudits for her portrayal of Wednesday Addams in the Netflix horror comedy series Wednesday (2022–present), for which she received nominations at the Golden Globe, Primetime Emmy, and Screen Actors Guild awards. After starring in the commercially successful blockbuster fantasy Beetlejuice Beetlejuice (2024), she played a troubled young woman in the thriller Hurry Up Tomorrow (2025) and the titular android in the science fiction film Klara and the Sun (2026). Aside from acting, Ortega has been noted for her goth glam style and her support of various charitable causes.

== Early life ==
Jenna Marie Ortega was born on September 27, 2002, in Rancho Mirage, California. Her father, Edward Ortega, who is of Mexican descent, is a former sheriff who works at a California district attorney's office; her mother, Natalie Ortega, is an emergency room nurse of Mexican and Puerto Rican descent. She is the fourth of their six children. Ortega's maternal great-grandmother was an undocumented immigrant from Sinaloa, Mexico, and her maternal grandfather relocated from Puerto Rico to the Bronx, New York, before moving to the Western United States. Ortega grew up in La Quinta, California, and has called her childhood self "loud and extroverted".

Ortega wanted to act from the age of six after watching Dakota Fanning in the 2004 thriller film Man on Fire. Ortega was unable to understand how a young child could perform in a way that could scare her so much; she analyzed the film several times and decided she wanted to be "the Puerto Rican version of" Fanning. Ortega later said that acting served as an escape from the pressure she placed on herself as a "very existential" and anxious child. She begged her mother for three years to let her pursue that career path. Her mother attempted to distract her with activities such as soccer and schoolwork; soccer almost convinced Ortega to quit pursuing acting. Ortega's mother bought her a monologue book when she was nine and posted a video of her performing online. A casting director saw it and signed her to an agency.

Ortega's mother began driving her to Los Angeles as often as five days per week for auditions, a journey that could take six hours round trip. She struggled to land roles, because few parts existed for Latinas. Such rejection challenged her self-esteem. She considered dyeing her hair blonde in an attempt to book more roles. For the first year, with no connections in the film industry, Ortega auditioned only for television commercials. She managed to secure parts in 12 national campaigns, including three for McDonald's. During the week, she would act in Los Angeles for a few days and return home to attend school. She attended public school, including Amelia Earhart Elementary School and John Glenn Middle School. She stopped attending public school during eighth grade to act in Disney productions and got an apartment in Los Angeles after booking a role in Stuck in the Middle. During that time, Ortega acted in Los Angeles during the workweek and returned home on weekends. She has said her early teenage years were "full of tension and fear" of making mistakes while working.

== Career ==
=== 2012–2017: Early acting roles and Disney ===
Ortega made her acting debut in the sitcom Rob (2012). In 2013, she made her film debut in an uncredited role as the vice president's daughter in the superhero film Iron Man 3. That same year, Ortega played a supporting role in the horror film Insidious: Chapter 2. From 2014 to 2019, Ortega had a recurring role on The CW comedy-drama television series Jane the Virgin as a younger version of Jane Villanueva, who is portrayed by Gina Rodriguez as an adult. Declan Gallagher of Entertainment Weekly commended Ortega's performance, writing that she avoided "the trappings of a typical child actor". She also starred in the direct-to-video comedy film The Little Rascals Save the Day (2014) and the Netflix sitcom Richie Rich (2015). Ortega appeared in the comedy-drama film After Words (2015) as Anna Chapa, the daughter of a male escort. The Los Angeles Times praised her as "adorable", whereas The Arizona Republic found her "horribly cloying".

From 2016 to 2018, Ortega led the Disney Channel sitcom Stuck in the Middle as Harley Diaz, an aspiring inventor who is the middle child of seven siblings. Ortega drew inspiration from her own family and relationships with her siblings; she felt her experience starring on the show was akin to reality television. Common Sense Media said that Ortega "commands this role, pleading her case as a long-suffering middle kid while finding the humor in the many calamities that befall her efforts to shine". Her performance garnered three Imagen Award nominations for Best Young Actor – Television, including a win in 2018. She also voiced Princess Isabel in Elena and the Secret of Avalor (2016) and Elena of Avalor (2016–2020).

=== 2018–2021: Transition to mature roles ===
In 2018, Ortega starred in the film Saving Flora in the lead role of Dawn, a circus owner's daughter. After Stuck in the Middle ended in 2018, she aimed to act in more mature projects but found people assumed Disney roles were "all you can do, or all you were meant for". She considered quitting acting several times; she said that she "was too old for the young roles and too young for the older roles" and that she did not want to "prove [her]self" to casting directors unfamiliar with her. However, she was cast as Ellie Alves in the second season of the Netflix thriller series You and decided to continue acting due to enjoying the experience. Released in late 2019, the season received positive reviews; The Hollywood Reporter's Robyn Bahr noted Ortega as "a standout performer". Ortega was slated to return for the third and fourth seasons but was unable to do so due to scheduling conflicts.

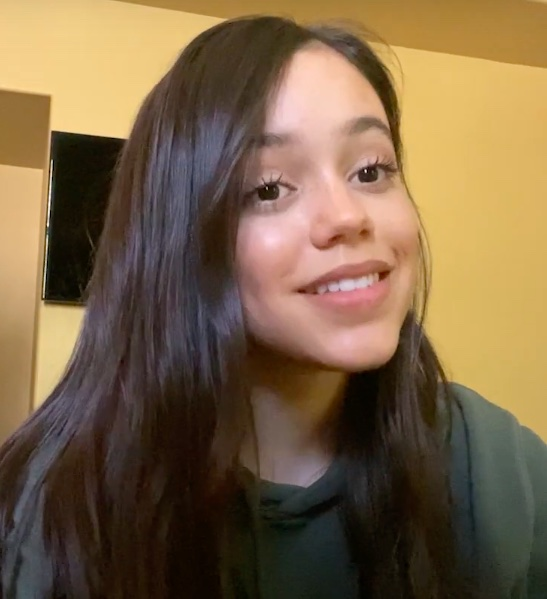
Ortega in 2020

Ortega played Phoebe, the love interest of Judah Lewis's character, in Netflix's horror-comedy film The Babysitter: Killer Queen, which was released in September 2020 to negative critical reviews. She also voiced a travel vlogger named Brooklynn in the Netflix animated show Jurassic World Camp Cretaceous (2020–2022). In 2021, she made her writing debut with the book It's All Love: Reflections for Your Heart & Soul, which contains a series of quotes and statements regarding faith and love. She starred in the Netflix comedy movie Yes Day (2021), portraying a stubborn teenager who wants more independence from her parents. It was released in March 2021 to mixed reviews. IndieWire and the Associated Press described Ortega as "very capable" and "impressively poised", respectively.

Ortega had a leading role in the high-school drama film The Fallout, starring as a student navigating emotional trauma after a school shooting. To prepare for the role, she looked at photographs and watched videos and interviews about school shootings; processing such events afterward "kind of came naturally". She also participated in the March for Our Lives movement, which led demonstrations in support of U.S. gun control legislation. The Fallout premiered at South by Southwest on March 17, 2021, and was released on HBO Max on January 27, 2022. It was well-received by critics, and Ortega's acting was applauded. Richard Roeper of the Chicago Sun-Times called her performance "grounded and deeply moving", and The Hollywood Reporter wrote that her "beautifully nuanced turn understands the nothing-to-look-at-here façade and the chinks in the armor".

=== 2022–2023: Mainstream breakthrough ===
In the slasher film Scream (2022)—the fifth film in the Scream franchise—Ortega played Tara Carpenter, of which she said: "I don't even think there are words in the English language to correctly express how happy, excited, and nervous I am for this journey". Directors Matt Bettinelli-Olpin and Tyler Gillett cast Ortega because of her ability to play both horror and comic tones, and for the sound of her scream. She felt nervous about joining a well-known franchise, wanting to respect its legacy while avoiding derivation. Scream was a critical and commercial success. According to The A.V. Club, Ortega demonstrated "incredible" resilience and resolve in her role. She also won the MTV Movie Award for Most Frightened Performance.

Ortega later appeared in the Foo Fighters–led horror film Studio 666 (2022), in which reviewers said she was underused. She then starred in the slasher film X (2022), which was directed and written by Ti West, who said Ortega was "fearless in her commitment". She signed onto the project because of its script, calling it "the most outrageous thing I've ever read", and the opportunity to work with West. X became Ortega's best-reviewed film on the review aggregator Rotten Tomatoes; The Australian dubbed her and co-star Mia Goth "scene-stealers". The comedy-horror American Carnage was Ortega's final film release of 2022. The A.V. Club said she was continuing "her streak as the new it-girl of horror with a stubborn punk persona that masks her care for other people", while IGN lauded her "no-shits-given shell".

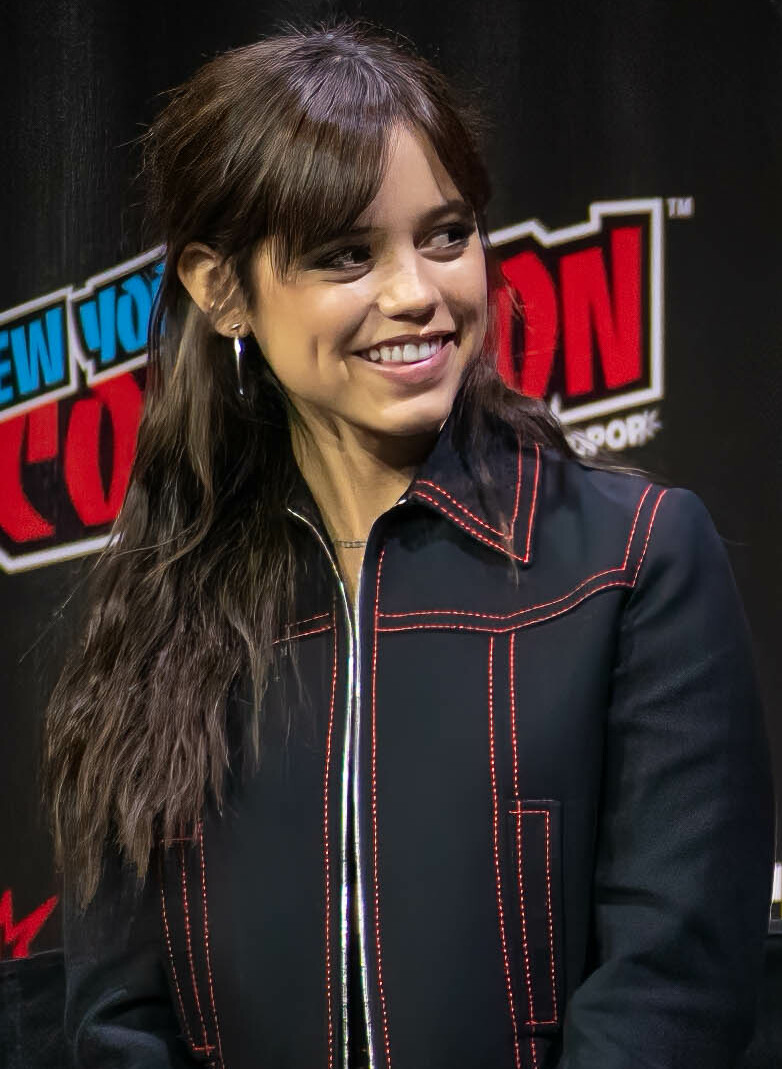
Ortega promoting Wednesday in 2022

In May 2021, Ortega was cast as Wednesday Addams in the Netflix comedy-horror series Wednesday, which she called a "new chapter" in her career. She auditioned on a Zoom call with director Tim Burton, during which she read a four-page monologue. The casting team felt her portrayal gave the character the necessary empathy. She was initially hesitant to accept the part because she wanted to focus on film acting and feared working on another TV series would prevent her from booking the roles she wanted. To prepare for the role, Ortega underwent "the most physical transformation [she had] ever done", cutting her hair and dyeing it black and altering her mannerisms, speaking style, and facial expressions. She also learned to play cello and speak German, read the original Addams Family comic, and watched the 1960s television adaptation. Ortega called the production of Wednesday's first season her "most overwhelming job" and said she was in a constant state of confusion and stress over the direction of the series and character. She said she had never "had to put my foot down on a set in the way that [she] had to on Wednesday", believing that the initial writing was nonsensical from a character standpoint and did not suit Wednesday's personality. While filming some scenes, Ortega changed her lines without informing the crew.

Upon Wednesday's release, critics widely praised Ortega's performance; CNN said she set the series apart from similar spin-offs, being "relentlessly strange, a portrait in unblinking intensity and oddly endearing all at once". The role garnered Ortega international recognition, and Wednesday became one of Netflix's most-watched shows, receiving over a billion viewing hours within a month. Ortega was nominated for a Golden Globe Award, a Screen Actors Guild Award, and the Primetime Emmy Award for Outstanding Lead Actress in a Comedy Series; she became the second-youngest Outstanding Comedy Actress nominee at the Emmys. She later spoke about her discomfort with becoming well known for her work on the show, having had a creatively unpleasant experience filming it.

In March 2023, Ortega hosted an episode of NBC's sketch comedy series Saturday Night Live. She reprised her role as Tara Carpenter in Scream VI. The film was released in March 2023 and grossed over $169 million on a budget of $33–35 million. Deadline Hollywood attributed its box-office success partially to Ortega's star power. In Variety, Owen Gleiberman praised her "surly spunk", and Slant Magazine said she "fantastically embodies the role". In November 2023, Ortega exited the Scream franchise after her co-star Melissa Barrera was fired for her pro-Palestinian comments on the Gaza war; she said a subsequent film did not appear to be the "right move" due to the changing cast and crew. Earlier reports suggested that Ortega left the franchise because of scheduling conflicts with the filming of Wednesday's second season and an unsuccessful request for seven-figure pay. In the crime thriller film Finestkind (2023), Ortega played Mabel, a drug dealer's daughter seeking her own path in life. The film premiered at the Toronto International Film Festival to negative reviews. Many journalists said Ortega had been miscast.

=== 2024–present: Continued film roles ===
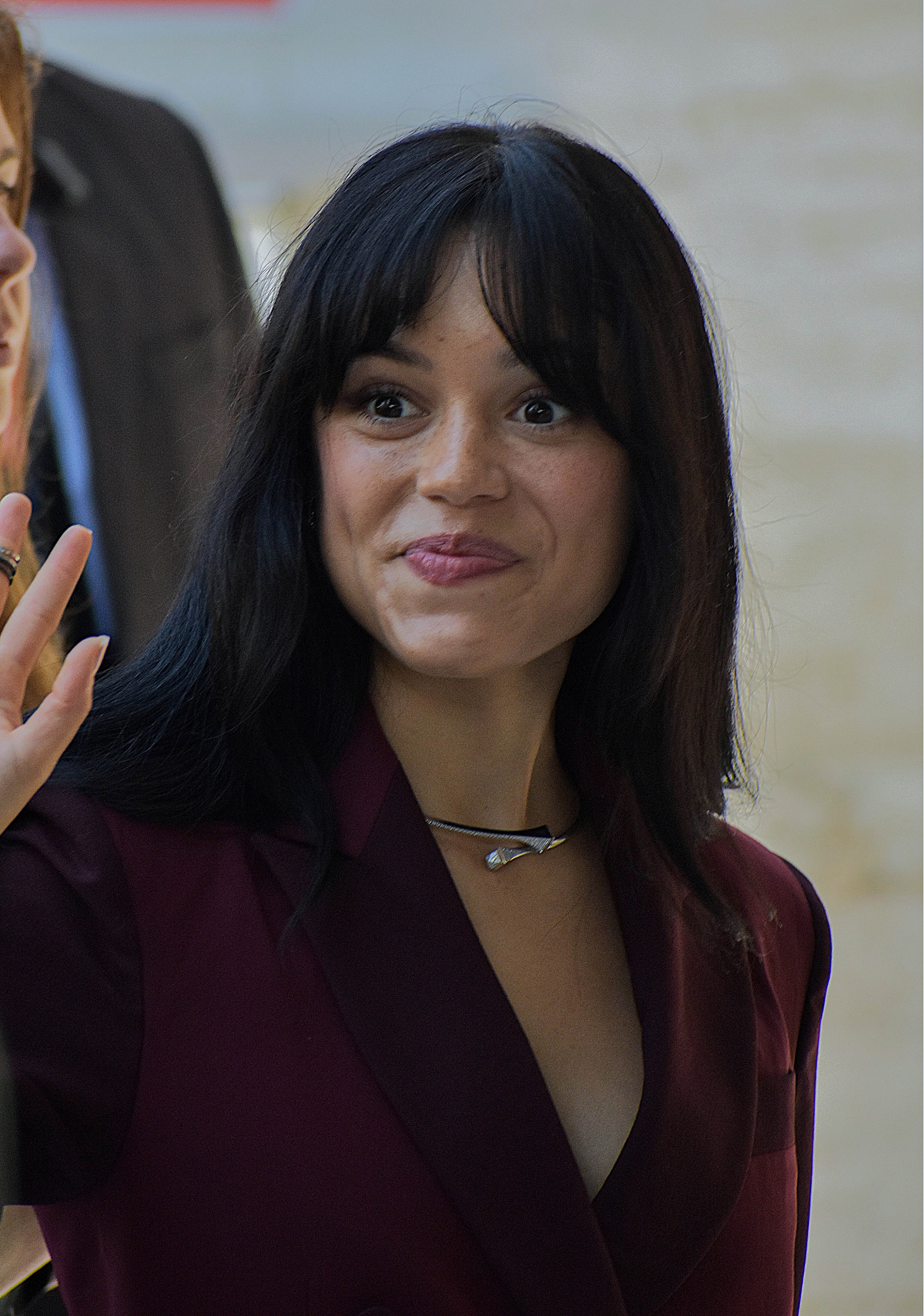
Ortega at the Beetlejuice Beetlejuice film premiere at the 2024 Venice International Film Festival

Ortega began 2024 with a starring role in the drama Miller's Girl, opposite Martin Freeman. The film tells the story of Cairo Sweet (Ortega), a high-school student whose writing ability captures her teacher's interest, which leads to a complicated relationship between them. In 2022, she called her character "the most complex character that I've ever played" and considered the material risky since she thought it would provoke discussions on topics people might find disturbing. RogerEbert.com's Christy Lemire found Ortega "magnetic enough" to maintain the viewer's interest, although she thought the character's motives were predictable and illogical; Mark Kennedy of the Associated Press called the film "a pointless, awkward turn" in her career. She later appeared in the romantic drama Winter Spring Summer or Fall and the video for Sabrina Carpenter's song "Taste".

Ortega starred in Burton's fantasy film Beetlejuice Beetlejuice (2024)—a sequel to Beetlejuice (1988)—playing Astrid Deetz, the cynical teenage daughter of Lydia Deetz. It opened the 81st Venice International Film Festival and received generally positive reviews. Rolling Stone called Ortega an "unimpeachable" casting choice and commended the emotions she conveyed using a "world-class deadpan stare". In a less favorable review, The Independent wrote that she "can't help but seem a little bland and strait-laced" acting opposite Michael Keaton as Betelgeuse. The film grossed $451 million worldwide; publications such as Boxoffice Pro and TheWrap credited Ortega for attracting younger audiences, particularly members of Generation Z.

In the dark comedy Death of a Unicorn (2025), Paul Rudd and Ortega starred as a father and daughter who accidentally kill a unicorn, leading to brutal consequences. Ortega said she was drawn to the project because of its script, deeming it original and unique. The film received mixed reviews. Peter Travers of ABC News said Ortega brought energy to the story despite its perceived shortcomings. A review in IGN called her portrayal a "wonderfully lived-in performance" of a withdrawn youth, praising her ability to "inject great thought and subtext into any scenario". She next featured in Trey Edward Shults's thriller film Hurry Up Tomorrow, co-starring with Abel Tesfaye and Barry Keoghan. Ortega played a troubled young woman who pulls Tesfaye's character into an existential odyssey. Critics panned the film. Clint Worthington of RogerEbert.com felt Ortega did "her best to uplift her half of the movie", while Frank Scheck of The Hollywood Reporter commended her "intense" energy. On the other hand, IndieWire's Charles Bramesco called her performance "imitative and hollow".

In August 2025, Ortega reprised her role as Wednesday in the second season of Wednesday. She became a producer, which she called a "natural progression" due to the first season's collaborative nature, though she said her new role made her feel "more empowered to speak [her] mind". Ortega was involved with writing, design, and casting; she discussed scripts, oversaw prosthetics, and observed auditions and chemistry reads. She said the experience was "a great education" where she sought to immerse herself and absorb as much as possible. Ortega's performance in the second season received positive reviews. RogerEbert.com called it "expertly calibrated between menacing and inquisitive", and The Guardian said her "charisma could power a thousand hearses". She also received her second Golden Globe and Actor Award (Note: Known as the Screen Actors Guild Awards before a November 2025 name change to the Actor Awards) nominations.

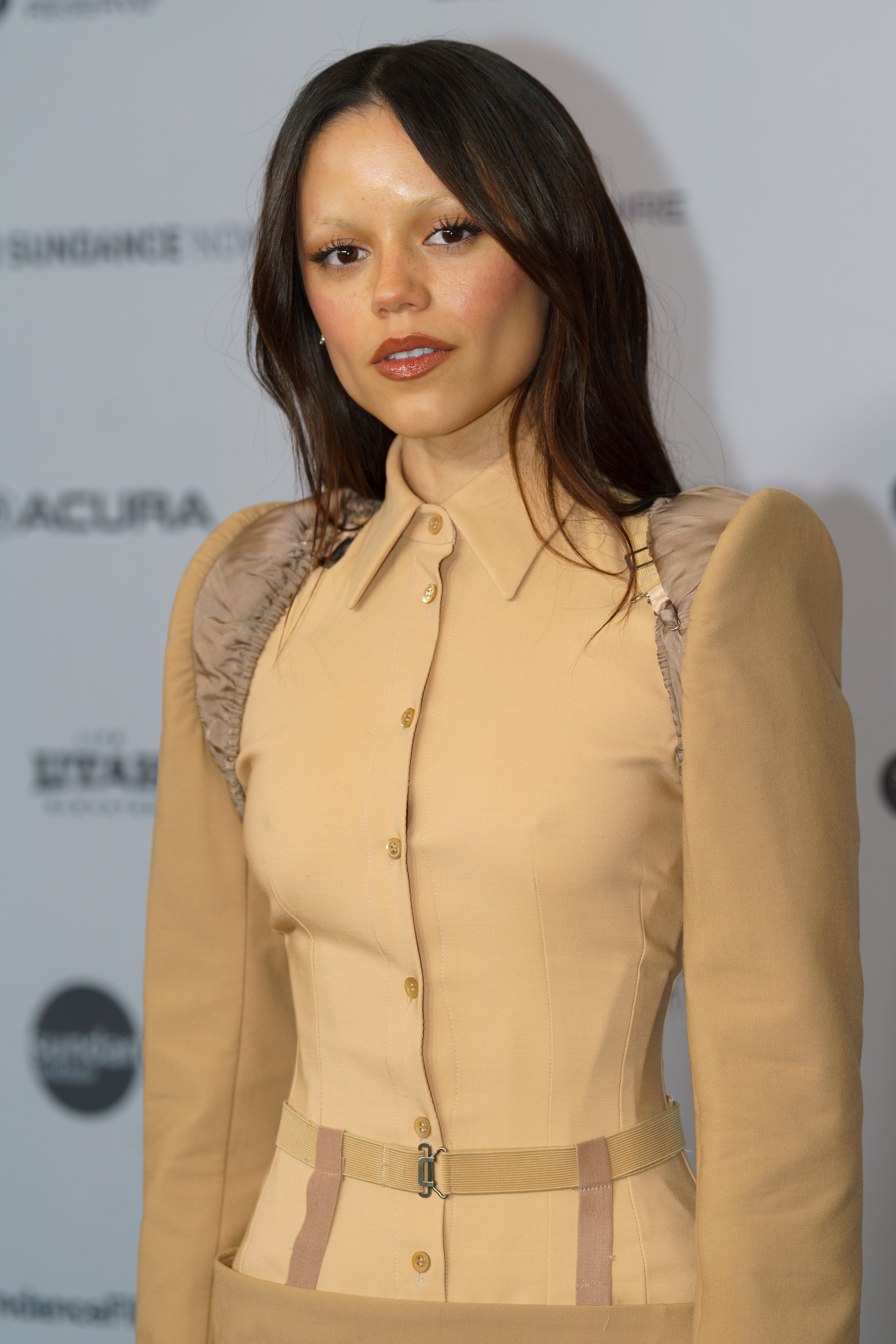
Ortega at the 2026 Sundance Film Festival

In 2026, she co-starred opposite Natalie Portman in the dark comedy The Gallerist. The Guardian and The Hollywood Reporter thought that the film's direction and writing hindered Ortega's acting. Her next project was the Taika Waititi–directed Klara and the Sun (2026), based on the novel by Kazuo Ishiguro. She played Klara, an artificial friend to a lonely, ailing teenage girl; she called the character her "happiest" yet. Waititi cast Ortega for her "young and hip and cool and weird" qualities. The film bombed at the box office and received negative reviews, with David Rooney of The Hollywood Reporter writing that while Ortega "brings such a spirited edge to darker material like Wednesday or Beetlejuice Beetlejuice ... (she) is at sea here trying to find some kind of feeling." The Globe and Mail's Barry Hertz similarly concluded that Ortega's "committed" portrayal was "lost amidst the wreckage".

==== Upcoming projects ====
Ortega is slated to co-star in J. J. Abrams's science fiction-fantasy film The Great Beyond (2027), for which she was given creative control over her character's appearance, and to return in the third season of Wednesday.

== Other ventures ==
=== Activism and philanthropy ===
Ortega has used her platform to support various causes, including Pride Over Prejudice—a DoSomething campaign that advocates for immigrants and refugees—the National Bullying Prevention Center, the AIDS Healthcare Foundation, the Geena Davis Institute on Gender in Media, Planned Parenthood, and the Joint United Nations Programme on HIV and AIDS. She has also advocated for immigration and women's rights and spoken about wanting to increase Latino representation in the entertainment industry.

In 2016, Ortega organized a meet-and-greet event for fans to raise money for a young girl with cancer. At the 2018 Radio Disney Music Awards, Ortega wore a jacket displaying the words "I Do Care and U Should Too" in response to the clothing First Lady of the United States Melania Trump wore on a visit to see immigrant children who were being housed without their parents. Trump's jacket read, "I Really Don't Care, Do U?". Ortega's protest gained significant media coverage; she told the Associated Press that Trump's apparel displayed poor judgment and that as First Lady, she ought to show concern for migrant children. Ortega later said: "We should all care about each other and our country ... we are one country under God". In 2019, she appeared at numerous We Day benefit concerts in the U.S. and Canada to raise funds for WE Charity.

In 2023, as part of Artists4Ceasefire, Ortega signed a letter urging the United States Congress and President Joe Biden to call for an immediate ceasefire in the Gaza Strip during the Israeli–Palestinian conflict. She later condemned the Tel al-Sultan attack and emphasized the need for a ceasefire. In 2026, she denounced the United States Immigration and Customs Enforcement (ICE) following the killings of Renée Good and Alex Pretti.

=== Endorsements ===
In 2020, Ortega was named a brand ambassador for the cosmetics manufacturer Neutrogena and was the face of its "My Quinceañera Journey" campaign. In 2023, she became an ambassador for the sportswear company Adidas and the luxury fashion brand Dior. She was the face of Adidas Sportswear, the company's first new line in 50 years, as well as one of the faces of the #DareInGrisDior campaign. In 2025, she was announced as a global beauty ambassador for Dior. Ortega starred alongside Danny Ramirez, Olivia Negron, and Patricia Mauceri in an advertisement for Doritos that aired during Super Bowl LVIII in February 2024.

== Media image and artistry ==
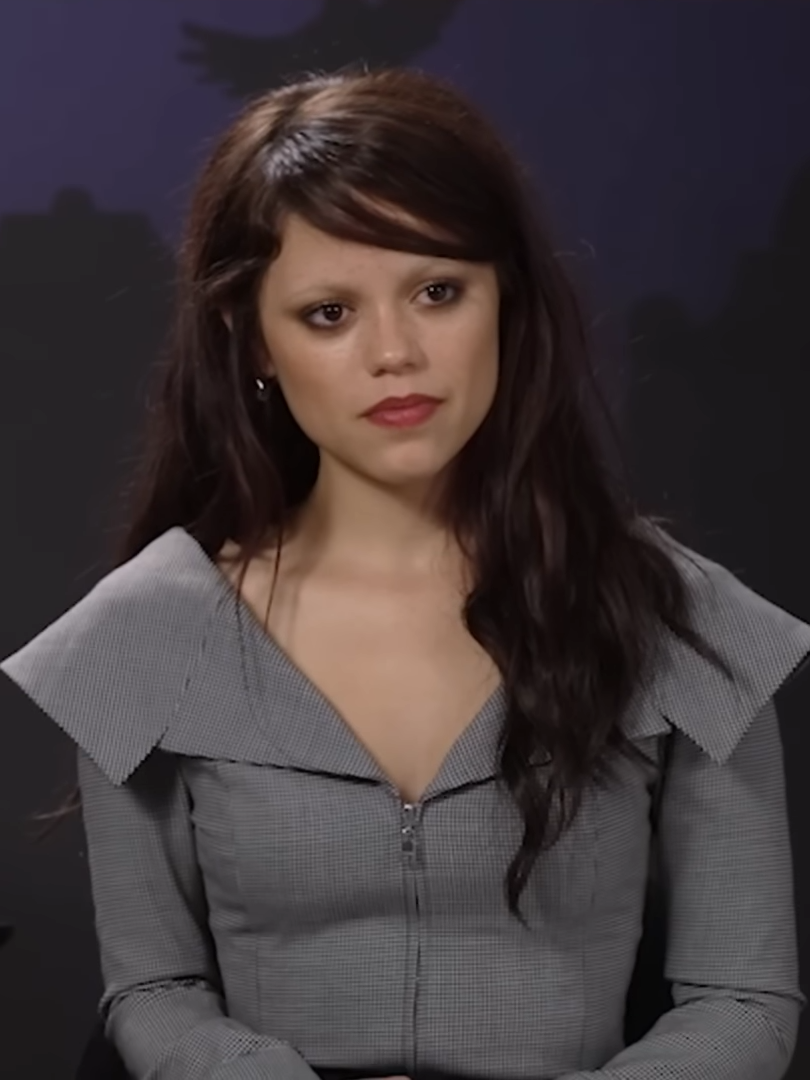
Media publications have described Ortega's style as goth glam.

Of Ortega's off-screen persona, Who What Wear wrote in 2022 that she is "poised, mature, and wise beyond her years" while providing "an essence of relatability". A 2023 Harper's Bazaar story described her as "quiet and contemplative". She is known for her deadpan personality; according to Vanity Fair, she has a "black-hole persona", though she is "much warmer and more cheerful" in real life. Ortega said her public image is inaccurate and that she can feel "incredibly misunderstood". She is active on Instagram but has described social media overall as a "comparing game" and "very manipulative". She said she became afraid her comments on social media would be misinterpreted after Wednesday was released, since her sarcasm and dry humor are easily misconstrued. As a minor, Ortega was sent explicit AI-generated images of herself, which led to her deleting her Twitter account.

Burton compared Ortega's acting style to silent film acting, saying she expresses emotion through her eyes without words. Megan Park, who directed Ortega in The Fallout, noted her ability to understand when she should "give her all" or restrain herself while acting. Ortega said she tries not to be more prepared than necessary for a scene due to the unpredictability of one's reactions in real life. She finds it natural for actors to assimilate into their characters' environment, for instance using sarcasm and rewatching films in preparation for Wednesday. The Beetlejuice Beetlejuice producer Tommy Harper described Ortega as "very professional" and "a student of film and television"; he stated that she observes the set between the setups and compared her interest to that of an assistant director. When discussing her role choices, Ortega said that she looks for projects that will have a "forever effect" for her, such as The Fallout, and that she feels most comfortable in horror works, calling them "very therapeutic". The South China Morning Post observed that her horror projects, such as Scream and American Carnage, often contain "ironic" aspects, while Complex stated that she is known for her "quirky, darkly comic roles". Media publications have dubbed Ortega "Gen Z's scream queen", and the Hollywood Foreign Press Association called her the "scream queen for the 21st century". In 2024, People listed her amongst the most iconic scream queens of all time.

Entertainment Weekly described Ortega as "one of the preeminent faces of her generation" and attributed her popularity with audiences to her "moody, thoughtful screen presence". In 2018, The Hollywood Reporter named Ortega one of the top stars under age 18. In 2023, she appeared on Variety's "Young Hollywood Impact Report" (breakthrough performers), The Hollywood Reporter's Power 100 (the most powerful women in entertainment), and TheWrap's "Latino Power List" (Latino trailblazers in entertainment and media). Complex also listed her among the best actors in their 20s from 2023 to 2026. Forbes included her on the 2024 edition of its 30 Under 30 in the Hollywood & Entertainment category. In 2026, Ortega was invited to join the Academy of Motion Picture Arts and Sciences.

Ortega has also been called a style icon by Harper's Bazaar. Her initial red-carpet style featured bright colors, patterned clothing, and many accessories. Enrique Melendez, her stylist, dressed Ortega in RED Valentino and Thom Browne, wanting her wardrobe to be age-appropriate, fashionable, and stylistically interesting. They later tried to move away from the "feminine and flirty and frilly" style of other Disney actresses. After her role in You, Ortega began wearing heavier makeup and darker clothing. Media publications said her later style borrowed from Wednesday's while incorporating high fashion and called it "goth glam". (Note: Sources drawing comparisons to Wednesday's style: Sources describing Ortega's style as goth glam:) During the press tour for the second season of Wednesday, Vogue and Harper's Bazaar highlighted her choice of Miista boots as part of that aesthetic. Ortega said that playing Wednesday "changed [her] taste a lot" and that she had "a hard time getting her off of [her], at least clothing-wise". The New York Observer and Harper's Bazaar credited her with popularizing "Wednesdaycore", a high-fashion interpretation of gothic style. In 2025, Vogue listed her among the best dressed of the year; the magazine wrote that she is noted for leading "the goth resurgence in dramatic silhouettes, strange textures, monochromatic palettes, bleached brows, and smudgy, undone glam". In November 2026, Ortega was featured on the cover of Vogue magazine with a featured story titled "Wednesday's Child".

== Personal life ==
Ortega has said she would like to be a "private person" and not discuss her romantic life publicly, believing that it distracts audiences from her work. She has called the concept of celebrity "absolutely ridiculous". Ortega has said that her friends and family give her a sense of safety that helps her deal with the more challenging parts of her career, and that growing up in an industry dominated by adults forced her to mature faster than normal. In 2025, Ortega said she has anxiety and obsessive–compulsive disorder.

== Bibliography ==
- Ortega, Jenna (January 5, 2021). It's All Love: Reflections for Your Heart & Soul. Random House Books for Young Readers. ISBN 978-0593174562. OCLC 1394000413.
