= Misty =

Misty may refer to:

== Music ==
- "Misty" (song), by Erroll Garner
- Misty (Ray Stevens album), an album by Ray Stevens featuring the above song
- Misty (Richard "Groove" Holmes album), an album by Richard "Groove" Holmes featuring the above song
- Misty (Eddie "Lockjaw" Davis album), an album by Eddie "Lockjaw" Davis and Shirley Scott featuring the above song
- Misty (Harold Mabern album), an album by Harold Mabern featuring the above song
- Misty (Dexter Gordon album), an album by Dexter Gordon featuring the above song
- Misty, a 1975 album by American jazz singer Chris Connor
- "Misty", a song by Kate Bush from the album 50 Words for Snow
- "Misty", a bonus song by MiSaMo from the album "Haute Couture (EP)"

== Fictional characters ==
- Lizard Misty, in the manga series Saint Seiya
- Misty (Pokémon), in the Pokémon franchise
- Misty Brightdawn, in the television series My Little Pony: Make Your Mark
- Misty Day, in the television season American Horror Story: Coven
- Misty Fey, in the video game series Ace Attorney
- Misty Knight, in the Marvel Universe
- Misty, in TV snow Super Doll Licca-chan
- Misty Quigley, in the television series Yellowjackets (TV series)

== Other uses ==
- Misty (satellite program), reportedly a classified United States satellite program
- Misty (comics), a British comic published from 1978 to 1980
- Misty (film), a 1961 adaptation of the book Misty of Chincoteague
- Misty (TV series), a 2018 South Korean television series

== See also ==
- Mist (disambiguation)
- Misti (disambiguation)
- Misty Blue (disambiguation)
- MISTY1, a cryptographic algorithm
