= Misti (disambiguation) =

Misti is a dormant volcano in Peru.

Misti may also refer to:

- Misti Norris, American chef
- Misti Traya, American actor
- Misti (horse), a racehorse owned by Guillaume d'Ornano

== See also ==
- Misty (disambiguation)
