= Catherine Havasi =

American AI scientist

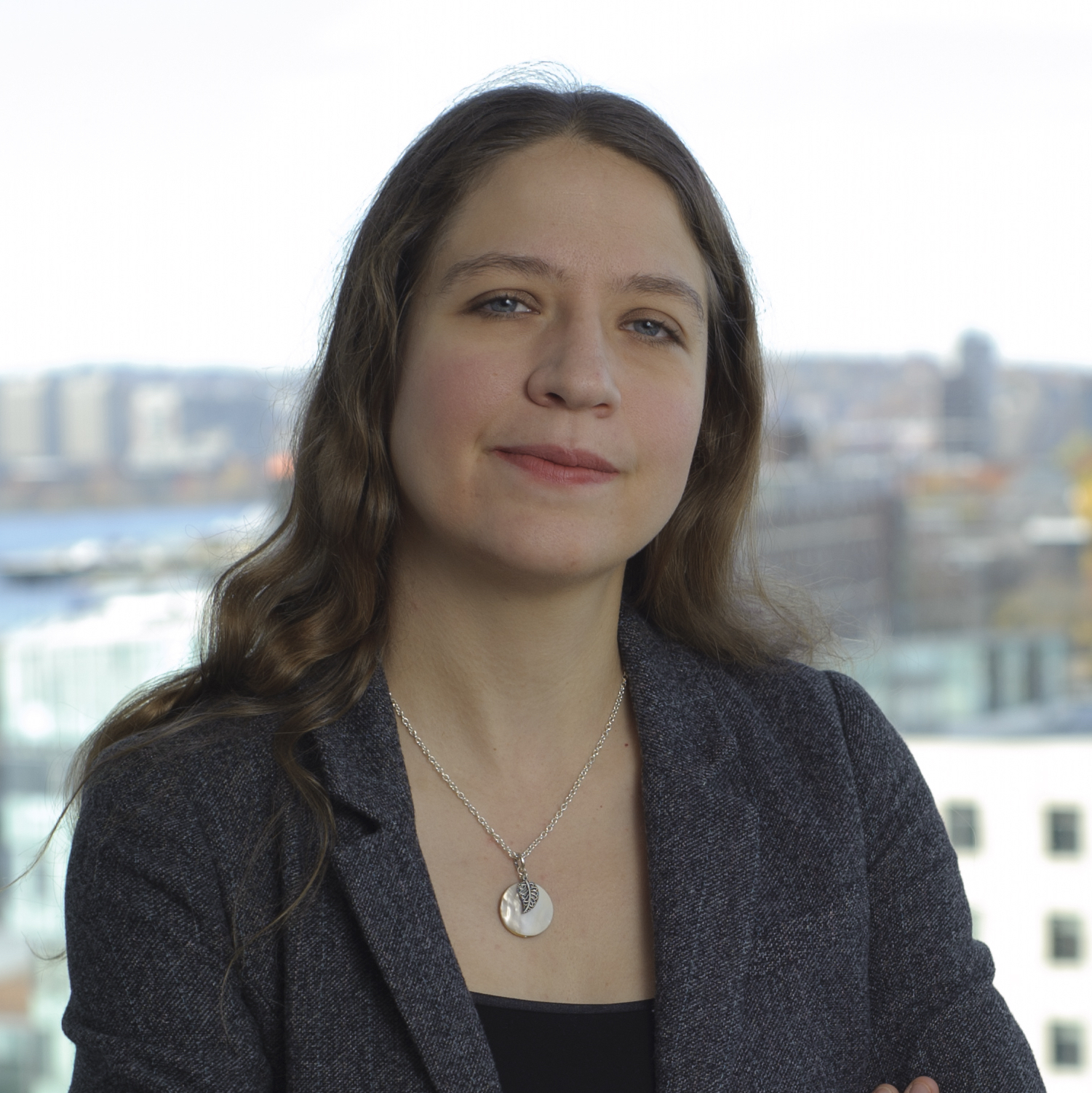
- Born: 1981 (age 44–45); Pittsburgh, Pennsylvania
- Education: Massachusetts Institute of Technology (MIT) (S.B., 2003) (M.Eng, 2004); Brandeis University (Ph.D, 2009)
- Known for: Artificial intelligence; Luminoso
- Scientific career
- Fields: Artificial intelligence
- Thesis: Discovering Semantic Relations Using Singular Value Decomposition (2009)
- Doctoral advisor: James Pustejovsky

Catherine Havasi (born 1981) is an American scientist who specializes in artificial intelligence (AI) at MIT Media Lab. She co-founded and was CEO of AI company, Luminoso for 8 years. Havasi was a member of the MIT group engaged in the Open Mind Common Sense (also known as OMCS) AI project that created the natural language AI program ConceptNet. Havasi is currently the Chief of Innovation and Technology Strategy at Babel Street, AI-enabled data-to-knowledge platform.

== Early life and education ==
Havasi grew up in Pittsburgh and became interested in artificial intelligence from reading Marvin Minsky's 1986 book The Society of Mind. She attended the Massachusetts Institute of Technology, where she became involved in the MIT Media Lab and studied under Minsky. Havasi is an alumnus of the Science Talent Search 1999 as well as the International Science and Engineering Fair 1996, 1998, and 1999. She received a S.B. and M.Eng from MIT and a PhD in computer science from Brandeis University.

== Career ==
In the 1990s, Catherine Havasi invented crowd sourcing for artificial intelligence. In 1999, she became involved in the MIT project Open Mind Common Sense with Minsky and Push Singh, and was part of a team that created ConceptNet, an open-source semantic network based on the information in the OMCS database.

In 2010, Havasi was among the team that founded Luminoso, a text analytics software company building on the work of ConceptNet.

Havasi was named among Boston Business Journal's "40 Under 40", of business and civic leaders making a major impact in their respective fields in 2014. Fast Company included her in its "100 Most Creative People in Business 2015" listing.

In 2019, the U.S Embassy invited Dr. Catherine to Portugal to give a series of lectures on "Practical Natural Language Processing" due to her work at MIT, expanding the fields of transfer and meta learning, educational outreach, natural language understanding, and computational creativity.

She is co-author of 7 peer-reviewed journal articles on AI and language, and many peer-reviewed major conference presentations.

== Selected publications ==
=== Most cited publication ===
- Cambria, Erik, Bjorn Schuller, Yunqing Xia, and Catherine Havasi. "New avenues in opinion mining and sentiment analysis." IEEE Journal of Intelligent Systems 28, no. 2 (2013): 15-21. (cited 701 times according to Google Scholar as of 24 September 2018)
- Havasi, Catherine, Robert Speer, and Jason Alonso. "ConceptNet 3: a flexible, multilingual semantic network for common sense knowledge." In Recent advances in natural language processing, Borovets, Bulgaria, September 2007. pp. 27-29.Philadelphia, PA: John Benjamins, 2007. (cited 341 times according to Google Scholar as of 24 September 2018)
- Speer, Robert, and Catherine Havasi. "Representing General Relational Knowledge in ConceptNet 5."In LREC, pp. 3679–3686. 2012. (cited 227 times according to Google Scholar as of 24 September 2018)

=== Other publications ===
- Catherine Havasi, Robert Speer, James Pustejovsky, and Henry Lieberman.'Digital Intuition: Applying Common Sense Using Dimensionality Reduction. IEEE Journal of Intelligent Systems, 24(4) July 2009. (cited 97 times according to Google Scholar as of 24 September 2018)
- Robert Speer, Catherine Havasi, and Henry Lieberman.AnalogySpace: Reducing the dimensionality of common sense knowledge. Proceedings of AAAI vol. 8, pp. 548–553.2008, July 2008. (cited 193 times according to Google Scholar as of 24 September 2018)
