= Mindpixel =

Artificial intelligence project

The Mindpixel logo

Mindpixel was a web-based collaborative artificial intelligence project which aimed to create a knowledgebase of millions of human validated true/false statements, or probabilistic propositions. It ran from 2000 to 2005.

== Description ==
Participants in the project created one-line statements which aimed to be objectively true or false to 20 other anonymous participants. In order to submit their statement they had first to check the true/false validity of 20 such statements submitted by others. Participants whose replies were consistently out of step with the majority had their status downgraded and were eventually excluded. Likewise, participants who made contributions which others could not agree were objectively true or false had their status downgraded. A validated true/false statement is called a mindpixel.

The project enlisted the efforts of thousands of participants and claimed to be "the planet's largest artificial intelligence effort".

The project was conceived by Chris McKinstry, a computer scientist and former Very Large Telescope operator for the European Southern Observatory in Chile, as MISTIC (Minimum Intelligent Signal Test Item Corpus) in 1996. Mindpixel was developed out of this program, and started in 2000 and had 1.4 million mindpixels in January 2004. The database and its software is known as GAC, which stands for "Generic Artificial Consciousness" and is pronounced Jak.

McKinstry believed that the Mindpixel database could be used in conjunction with a neural net to produce a body of human "common sense" knowledge which would have market value. Participants in the project were promised shares in any future value according to the number of mindpixels they had successfully created.

On 20 September 2005 Mindpixel lost its free server and is no longer operational. It was being rewritten by Chris McKinstry as Mindpixel 2 and was intended to appear on a new server in France.

Chris McKinstry died of suicide on 23 January 2006 and the future of the project and the integrity of the data is uncertain.

Some Mindpixel data have been utilized by Michael Spivey of Cornell University and Rick Dale of The University of Memphis to study theories of high-level reasoning and continuous temporal dynamics of thought. McKinstry, along with Dale and Spivey, designed an experiment that has now been published in Psychological Science in its January, 2008 issue. In this paper, McKinstry (as posthumous first author), Dale, and Spivey use a very small and carefully selected set of Mindpixel statements to show that even high-level thought processes like decision making can be revealed in the nonlinear dynamics of bodily action.

Other similar AI-driven knowledge acquisition projects are Never-Ending Language Learning and Open Mind Common Sense (run by MIT), the latter being also hampered when its director died of suicide.

== See also ==
- Never-Ending Language Learning
- Cyc
