= LaserBand =

US patient identification company

- Type: Limited Liability Company
- Industry: Healthcare
- Founded: St. Louis, Missouri
- Headquarters: St. Louis, Missouri; United States
- Area served: Worldwide
- Products: Patient identification, emergency response tags
- Website: LaserBand

LaserBand LLC was a provider of patient identification products to hospitals and emergency services and headquartered in St. Louis, Missouri. Zebra Technologies acquired LaserBand in 2012. Prior to the acquisition, LaserBand reported sales of $24 million.

== History ==
LaserBand was founded by James Riley in 1999. The company initially patented a self-laminating, laser-printable patient wristband and later developed other laser and thermal wristbands and ancillary products, including emergency response tags.

LaserBand was awarded contracts and established partnerships with several healthcare industry companies and organizations including, but not limited to:

- Cambio (2005)
- National Health Service of the United Kingdom (2008)
- HealthTrust Purchasing Group (2009)
- Novation (2011)
- Access (2011)

As of 2012, LaserBand products were used more than 200 million times per year by hospitals around the world.

== Acquisition ==
In July 2012, Zebra Technologies acquired LaserBand LLC for an undisclosed amount. Effective at the close of the acquisition, LaserBand's operations became a subsidiary of Zebra.

With the acquisition, Zebra widened its product and patent portfolio, particularly in the healthcare market. Zebra continues to market products acquired through LaserBand with the LaserBand brand name.
