= Luminoso =

Text analysis and artificial intelligence company

- Type: Privately held company
- Industry: Natural language understanding
- Founded: 2010
- Headquarters: Cambridge, Massachusetts, United States
- Key people: CEO: Mark Zides, Founders: Catherine Havasi, Dennis Clark, Jason Alonso, Robyn Speer
- Products: Luminoso Daylight; Luminoso Compass
- Number of employees: 50–100
- Website: www.luminoso.com

Luminoso is a Cambridge, MA-based text analytics and artificial intelligence company. It spun out of the MIT Media Lab and its crowd-sourced Open Mind Common Sense (OMCS) project.

The company has raised $20.6 million in financing, and its clients include Sony, Autodesk, Scotts Miracle-Gro, and GlaxoSmithKline.

== History ==
Luminoso was co-founded in 2010 by Dennis Clark, Jason Alonso, Robyn Speer, and Catherine Havasi, a research scientist at MIT in artificial intelligence and computational linguistics. The company builds on the knowledge base of MIT’s Open Mind Common Sense (OMCS) project, co-founded in 1999 by Havasi, who continues to serve as its director. The OCMS knowledge base has since been combined with knowledge from other crowdsourced resources to become ConceptNet. ConceptNet consists of approximately 28 million statements in 304 languages, with full support for 10 languages and moderate support for 77 languages. ConceptNet is a resource for making an AI that understands the meanings of the words people use.

During the World Cup in June 2014, the company provided a widely reported real-time sentiment analysis of the U.S. vs. Germany match, analyzing 900,000 posts on Twitter, Facebook and Google+.

== Applications ==
The company uses artificial intelligence, natural language processing, and machine learning to derive insights from unstructured data such as contact center interactions, chatbot and live chat transcripts, product reviews, open-ended survey responses, and email. Luminoso's software identifies and quantifies patterns and relationships in text-based data, including domain-specific or creative language. Rather than human-powered keyword searches of data, the software automates taxonomy creation around concepts, allowing related words and phrases to be dynamically generated and tracked.

Commercial applications include analyzing, prioritizing, and routing contact center interactions; identifying consumer complaints before they begin to trend; and tracking sentiment during product launches. The software natively analyzes text in fourteen languages, as well as emoji.

== Products ==
Luminoso's technology can be accessed via two products: Luminoso Daylight and Luminoso Compass. Luminoso Daylight enables a deep-dive analysis into batch or real-time data, whereas Luminoso Compass automates the categorization of real-time data. Both products offer a user interface as well as an API. Luminoso's products can be implemented through either a cloud-based or an on-premise solution.

== Research ==
Luminoso continues to actively conduct research in natural language processing and word embeddings and regularly participates in evaluations such as SemEval. At SemEval 2017, Luminoso participated in Task 2, measuring the semantic similarity of word pairs within and across five languages. Its solution outperformed all competing systems in every language pair tested, with the exception of Persian.

== Recognition ==
Luminoso has been listed as a "Cool Vendor in AI for Marketing" by Gartner, and has also been named a "Boston Artificial Intelligence Startup to Watch" by BostInno.

In May 2017, Luminoso was recognized as having the Best Application for AI in the Enterprise by AI Business, and was also shortlisted as the Best AI Breakthrough and Best Innovation in NLP.

== Competitors ==
Major competitors include Clarabridge and Lexalytics.

== Investors ==
The company raised $1.5 million from angel investors led by Basis Technology in 2012. Its first institutional funding round of $6.5 was completed in July 2014, led by Acadia Woods with participation from Japan’s Digital Garage. The company followed that with a $10M series B funding round in December 2018, led by DVI Equity Partners, with participation from Liberty Global Ventures, DF Enterprises, Raptor Holdco, Acadia Woods Partners, and Accord Ventures, among others.
