= Martin Research =

American computer company (1974–1986)

Qwint Systems, Inc.
- Formerly: Martin Research Ltd. (1974–1980)
- Founded: 1974; 52 years ago in Northbrook, Illinois
- Founder: Donald Paul Martin
- Defunct: 1986; 40 years ago
- Fate: Acquired by Zebra Technologies
- Products: Mike 1; Mike 2; Mike 3; Mike 8
- Number of employees: 130 (1984)

Martin Research Ltd., later Qwint Systems, Inc., was an American computer company founded by Donald Paul Martin in Northbrook, Illinois, United States. The company released their Mike family of modular kit microcomputers starting in 1975. These computers, spanning several models based on the Intel 8008, 8080, and Zilog Z80 microprocessors, proved very popular among hobbyists who wanted an inexpensive trainer computer.

== Foundation (1974–1975) ==
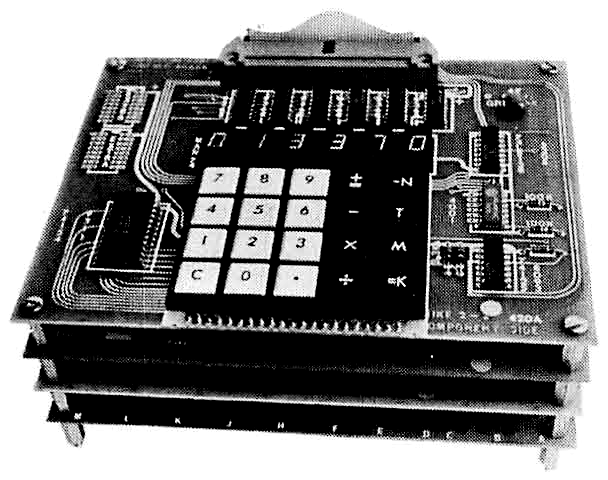
A Martin Research Mike 2

External videos
- Examination of a Martin Research Mike 3 on YouTube (by Tech Time Traveller)

Donald Paul Martin (1940 – August 27, 2019) founded Martin Research in Northbrook, Illinois, in around late 1974. Before starting his company, Martin graduated with a degree in electrical engineering from the Massachusetts Institute of Technology. Martin was also a co-founder of the Chicago Area Computer Hobbyists' Exchange (CACHE), a Chicago-based computer club, established around the same time of Martin Research's incorporation. Early in the company's existence, Martin had aspirations of having a wide swath of industrial buyers who needed programmable controllers in factory environments. Instead, Martin Research's products became popular among hobbyists, who used their microcomputers as trainer platforms. The company soon embraced this demographic, designing products for buyers desperate to get their hands on a microcomputer in the burgeoning market.

The company's first two products was a microcomputer, the Mike 1, and a book, Microcomputer Design (1975). The Mike 1 was a modular microcomputer running an Intel 8008 microprocessor. The book meanwhile catered to hobbyists wanting to design their own microcomputers based on the Intel 8008 and 8080 microprocessors. Book reviewers recommended Microcomputer Design for readers who had familiarity with digital circuit design and transistor–transistor logic. For an additional US$25 on the price of the $75 book, Martin shipped it with an 8008 chip. John Gilchrist praised Microcomputer Design in a review in the third issue of Byte magazine: "The book is an excellent reference for the hardware microcomputer designer ... It is obvious the author has designed, debugged and used everything about which he writes. Whew! After reading this book he has my utmost professional respect."

== Mike family (1975–1980) ==
The Mike family of microcomputers were sold as kits or as fully-assembled units and were designed around a stack of circuit boards, each measuring 5.5 by 7 inches (14 by 18 cm), separated by spacers. Each board carries a common bus through which each board can intercommunicate; the boards are connected via a common ribbon cable. Such a physical configuration was common among the more advanced minicomputers of its day. The systems allowed any order of circuit boards on the bus, although the most common order was the Console Board first, the CPU Board second, the PROM/RAM Board third, and any order of circuit boards thereafter. The Console Board sports a six-digit, seven-segment LED display and a twenty-key calculator-esque keypad. Users enter instructions into the computer in octal form using the keypads, with the display updating in real-time to show the input as it is being typed. Users can address and manipulate any location in memory and show the contents therein on the display.

The 8008-based Mike 1 was short-lived before being replaced by the Mike 2, a redesign of its predecessor also featuring an 8008 processor, at the end of the first quarter of 1975. The Mike 2 was built around the 2-20 Console Board; the 2-1 CPU Board, which aside from the 8008 chip also contained a crystal oscillator and timing-control circuits; and the 2-3 PROM/RAM board, holding 1 KB of RAM and 2 KB of PROM. The Mike 3 was released in the second quarter of 1975. It swapped out the Intel 8008 microprocessor for its successor the 8080 and bumped the maximum amount of RAM to 4 KB. Besides these two changes, the bus remained the same, and users could replace the CPU Board of the Mike 2 with that of the Mike 3 if they so desired. The Mike 2 continued to be sold alongside the Mike 3 after the release of the latter. Both systems proved quite popular in 1975, with Kilobaud Microcomputing editor John Craig writing in the magazine's charter issue that the computers were only second in popularity to the Altair 8800.

In early 1977, the company released the three-board Mike 8, based on the Zilog Z80 microprocessor. The Mike 8 features 4 KB of RAM and a 1-KB memory monitor program in ROM. Said memory monitor program also provides RAM testing, single-stepping, and interrupt-setting functionalities. The Mike 8 shipped with a blank Intel 2708 EPROM, onto which programs can be burned using the programmer located on the PROM/RAM Board. An ultra-violet light also came shipped with the Mike 8 for easy erasure and reuse of the included blank EPROM. The Mike 8 was the first in the Mike family to be offered with an optional enclosure, so called the "black-box", to facilitate industrial applications and advanced hobbyist use of the computer.

== Restructuring (1980–1985) ==
Around the turn of the 1980s, the company pivoted toward the business, industrial, and medical markets. In the process it discontinued its kit computers, changed its name to Qwint Research, and moved its headquarters down the road from its original Commercial Avenue location in Northbrook. Instead of leaning into the rapidly developing personal computer market, however, Qwint decided to sell teletypes and printing terminals. In 1977, Martin Research's vice president of marketing Kerry Berland had professed that the "ultimate market" for personal computers would "be a packaged, high-volume, low-cost consumer product", and that while his company would "like some of that market ... we have serious doubts that anyone who doesn't control the semiconductor process will make it there." In Datamation, Philip H. Dorn attributed the fall of Martin Research's kit computer operations to the IBM Personal Computer becoming a commodity after its release in 1981, leading to the maturation of the microcomputer market where many pioneering companies, with their hobbyist-centric products, had difficulty competing.

Qwint sold its first trio of products under the new brand in April 1981, with the KSR-743 transmit-and-receive printing terminal, the KSR-744 teletype, and the receive-only RO-743. In 1982, the company expanded the KSR-744 teletype with two successor models, both supporting word processor-esque editing features by expanding its RAM. The more expensive of the two added support for accessing early email providers. The following year, the company introduced the 780 series of teleprinters, which supported graphics. The new business proved lucrative enough for Qwint to employ 130 in 1984; the same year, the company moved into a 46,907-square-foot facility in Lincolnshire, Illinois. Zebra Technologies acquired Qwint in 1986.
