= Misty Blue (disambiguation) =

"Misty Blue" is a song written by Bob Montgomery and made popular by Dorothy Moore.

Misty Blue may also refer to:

- Misty Blue (album), a 1968 album by Ella Fitzgerald
- Misty Blue, a 1976 album by Dorothy Moore which contains the title track hit version
- Misty Blue (video game), a Japan-exclusive video game published by Enix
- Misty Blue Simmes, an American former professional wrestler
