= Mr.Mr. =

Mr.Mr., Mr. Mister or Mister Mister may refer to:

- Mr. Mister, a sinister character in 1937 musical The Cradle Will Rock
- Mr.Mr. (EP), by Girls' Generation
  - "Mr.Mr." (song), by Girls' Generation
- Mr.Mr (band), a South Korean band
- Mr. Mister, an American band
- "Mista Mista", a song from the CD version of The Score (Fugees album)
