= Motion Computing =

Former tablet computer manufacturer

Motion Computing, Inc.
- Type: Private
- Industry: Technology
- Founded: 2001
- Headquarters: Austin, Texas
- Owner: Xplore Technologies
- Website: www.xploretech.com

Motion Computing, Inc., was a developer of slate Tablet PC computers located in Austin, Texas. Motion Computing focused on vertical markets such as healthcare government, public safety, and construction. It was the first company to introduce Gorilla Glass, Bonded displays, built-in array microphones, and UV light-based disinfection stations for clinical environments.

== History ==
Motion Computing was founded in 2001 by a team of former Dell executives including David Altounian and Scott Eckert, who served as CEO of Motion. In 2002, it launched its first product, the Motion M1200, a tablet designed as a successor of pen slates from the 1990s. The M1200 was the first slate tablet available in a 12-inch size. That same year, Motion raised $6.5 million in funding. Its second funding round in 2003 raised $11.2 million, and the 2004 Series C round raised $25 million. In 2003, Motion launched the M1300, which was the first 1 GHz tablet using Intel Centrino mobile technology. The M1400, released in 2004, was the first 12-inch slate tablet to have a View Anywhere display.

Through its independent software vendor partnership program, Motion paired with companies including Active Ink and Mi-Co to advance the development of tablet PC applications. In 2007, Motion released the first mobile clinical assistant (MCA), the C5, at UCSF Medical Center.

Through a Series D funding round in 2008, the company closed $6 million. In 2009, Motion secured $5.6 million in a round of financing from eight investors. That same year, Motion announced that its C5 and F5 tablets would be the first rugged tablet PCs to use Corning's Gorilla Glass.

In February 2011, Motion introduced ReadyDock, the first chemical-free disinfection stations using ultraviolet technology, for the C5 tablet. In 2011, Motion Computing announced the Intel Atom "Oak Trail"-powered CL900 running Windows 7, a fully rugged 10" screen ultra-light Tablet PC, weighing 2.1 pounds. The company then announced the CL910 tablet in July 2012 and the CL920 in October 2014. Motion also released the LINCWorks RDA (Remote Data Access) series.

In April 2015, Xplore Technologies Corp. purchased Motion Computing Inc. for $16 million. At the time, Motion was the world's second-leading provider of rugged tablet PCs.

== Products ==
- F5m, 2015
- C5m
- R12, 2014
- CL920, 2014
- F5te, 2013
- J3600, 2013
- C5v, 2011
- F5v, 2011
- J3500, 2011
- CL900, 2011
- J3400, 2009
- F5, 2008
- LE1700, 2007
- C5, 2007
- LE1600TS (Touch Screen), 2006
- LS800, 2005
- LE1600, 2005
- M1400, 2004
- M1300, 2003
- M1200, 2002
- All devices listed can be used as digital art tablets. However, only the J3600 and prior devices feature Wacom active digitizer pen technology. This offers a high degree of pressure sensitivity thus mimicking the feel and nuance of pen and paper.
