= Xplore Technologies =

Rugged tablet computer brand

Xplore Technologies Corp.
- Company type: Public
- Traded as: Nasdaq: XPLR
- Industry: Technology
- Founded: 1996; 30 years ago in Ontario, Canada
- Headquarters: 14000 Summit Dr. Suite 900, Austin, Texas, United States
- Key people: Philip S Sassower (CEO, Chairman); Mark Holleran (COO, President); Tom Wilkinson (CFO)
- Products: Rugged tablets
- Revenue: ▲US$100.5 million (2015)
- Operating income: ▲US$1.05 million (2015)
- Net income: ▲US$362 thousand (2015)
- Total assets: ▲US$53.1 million (2015)
- Website: www.xploretech.com

Xplore Technologies was a publicly traded, designer, marketer and manufacturer of rugged tablets. The company was founded in 1996 and is based in Austin, Texas. In 2015, Xplore Technologies purchased assets of Motion Computing making it one of the top companies in the rugged tablet PC market. The company's products were primarily used by field service personnel, factory workers and military personnel. Xplore Technologies products were built to satisfy MIL-STD-810G and HAZLOC compliant ATEX standards, as well as Ingress Protection (IP) ratings. In 2018, Xplore was acquired by Zebra Technologies.

== History ==
Xplore Technologies was founded in Ontario, Canada in 1996 and began selling devices in 1998. The company was listed on the Toronto Stock Exchange in June 1998. In 2003, Xplore Technologies announced that it was relocating its corporate headquarters to Austin, Texas. The company filed to change its jurisdiction from Canada to Delaware in 2006. In July 2012, after being traded over-the-counter since leaving the TSX, the company filed for an IPO with the SEC and was listed on the Nasdaq stock exchange. In March 2015, Xplore Technologies raised $12 million when it sold an additional 2 million shares of common stock. In April 2015, the company bought assets of Motion Computing Inc. for $16 million. On July 5, 2018, Zebra Technologies announced its intent to acquire Xplore Technologies for roughly $90 million.
