= MIST (satellite) =

Swedish nanosatellite

The M.I.S.T. satellite (Miniature Student Satellite) is a satellite currently under development at the K.T.H. Royal Institute of Technology in Stockholm, Sweden. It is expected to be launched in 2024.

The satellite is a 3U CubeSat, primarily built by students working in small teams. The project was defined in 2014, and the work started on 28 January 2015. The project is led by Sven Grahn, an experienced satellite project manager.

Seven technical and scientific experiments are included in the K.T.H. student satellite M.I.S.T. The experiments have been proposed from inside K.T.H., from two Swedish companies and from the Swedish Institute of Space Physics in Kiruna, Sweden.
