= Zebra Technologies =

American technology company

Zebra Technologies Corporation

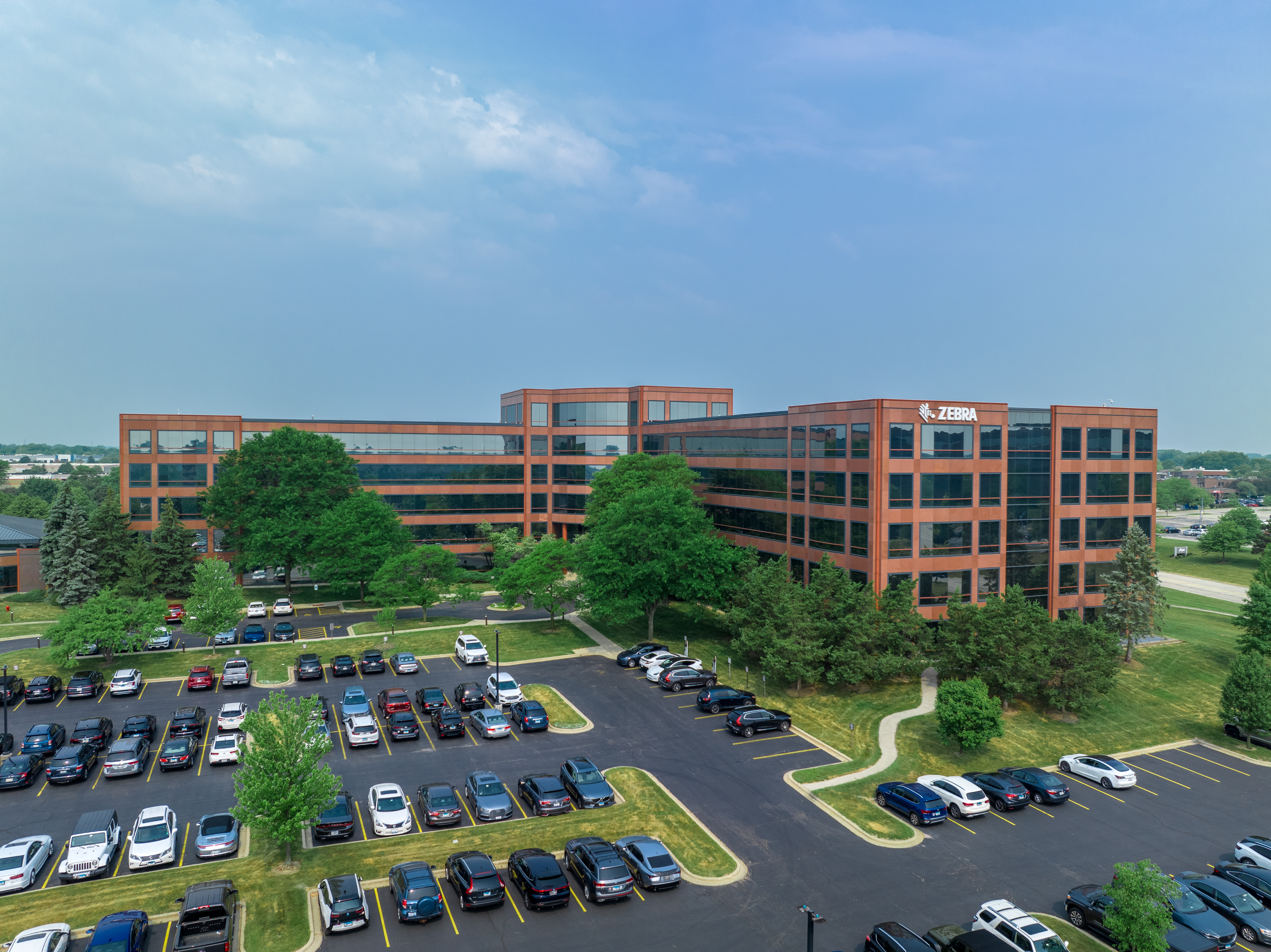
- Headquarters in Lincolnshire, Illinois
- Type: Public
- Traded as: Nasdaq: ZBRA (Class A); S&P 500 component
- ISIN: US9892071054
- Industry: Computer hardware, Manufacturing, Retail, Health care, Transportation and logistics
- Founded: June 5, 1969; 57 years ago
- Founders: Ed Kaplan; Gerhard Cless
- Headquarters: Lincolnshire, Illinois, U.S.
- Area served: Worldwide
- Key people: Anders Gustafsson (chair); William Burns (CEO)
- Products: RFID printers/encoders, barcode printers, mobile printers, card imaging printers, kiosk printers, real-time locating systems, UWB and related supplies and services, rugged mobile computers and tablets, scanners, software
- Revenue: ▲US$5.40 billion (2025)
- Operating income: ▼US$700 million (2025)
- Net income: ▼US$419 million (2025)
- Total assets: ▲US$8.50 billion (2025)
- Total equity: ▲US$3.59 billion (2025)
- Number of employees: 10,700 (2025)
- Website: zebra.com

Zebra Technologies Corporation (ZBR), commonly known as Zebra, is an American multinational technology conglomerate corporation, specializing in smart data capture systems.

As of 2025, Zebra holds nearly 8,000 patents and patent applications worldwide. Zebra (ZBRA) stock has been listed on the NASDAQ since its initial public offering (IPO) in 1991.

== History ==
=== 20th century ===
Zebra was incorporated in 1969 as Data Specialties Incorporated, a manufacturer of high-speed electromechanical products. The company changed its focus to specialty on-demand labeling and ticketing systems in 1982 and became Zebra Technologies Corporation in 1986. Zebra became a publicly traded company on the NASDAQ stock exchange in 1991.

In 1986, Zebra (then Data Specialties Incorporated) acquired Qwint Systems.

In 1998, Zebra Technologies merged with Eltron International, Inc.

=== 21st century ===
In 2000, Comtec Information Systems was acquired by Zebra Technologies, followed in 2003 by the acquisition of Atlantek, Inc., which was a manufacturer of photo ID printers.

In 2004, the company expanded into RFID smart label manufacturing. In the following years, Zebra also acquired Swecoin, WhereNet Corp, Proveo AG, and Navis Holdings (later divested in 2011).

The company bought the Enterprise Solutions Group (ESG) in 2008 and renamed the group Zebra Enterprise Solutions in 2009. In the same year, Multispectral Solutions, Inc. was acquired. In 2012, the companies LaserBand, and StepOne Systems were purchased with a cash price of $1.5 million.

In 2013, the company acquired Hart Systems for $94 million in cash from the private equity firm Topspin Partners LBO.

In 2014, Zebra acquired Motorola Solutions' Enterprise Division in a $3.45 billion transaction, providing mobile computing and advanced data capture communications technologies and services. Zebra's acquisition of the Enterprise Division included the Symbol Technologies and Psion product lines. Also in 2014, Zebra provided its real-time location system (RTLS) in NFL stadiums to track players and officials and provide location-based data for the NFL's Next Gen Stats program. Zebra’s partnership with the NFL extends through the 2025 football season.

In 2018, the company acquired Xplore Technologies, a maker of ruggedized tablets and other hard-wearing hardware.

In 2019, Zebra acquired Temptime Corporation, a provider of temperature monitoring devices to the healthcare industry. That same year, Zebra also acquired Profitect, a retail software company that developed a product line used for tracking and identifying inventory losses.

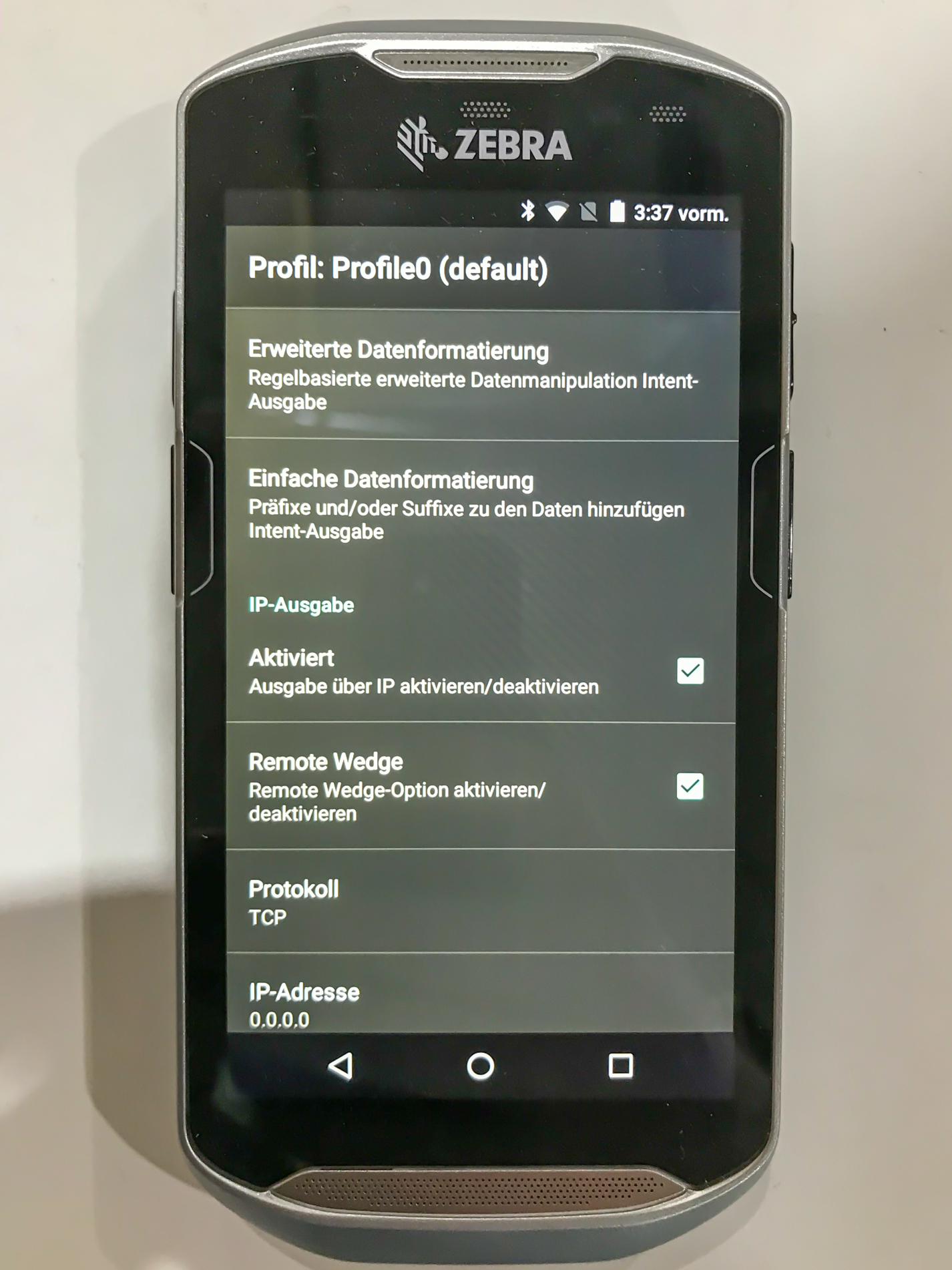
Zebra TC56 touchscreen handheld device configured in German

In 2020, Zebra acquired Reflexis Systems, a provider of workforce scheduling and task management software to the retail, food service, hospitality, and banking industries for $575 Million.

In 2021, Zebra acquired Adaptive Vision (provider of graphical Machine Vision software), Fetch Robotics (manufacturer of autonomous mobile robots) and Antuit.ai (provider of AI-powered SaaS solutions specific to forecasting and merchandising for the retail and CPG industries).

In 2022, Zebra acquired Matrox Imaging, a developer of machine vision components and systems.

In December 2023, Zebra partnered with Verizon Business to create a software package that will allow for a faster private 5G network. Zebra tablets and computers will work on Verizon's private network, allowing for more network capacity and fast communication.

In 2023, Zebra unveiled Zebra Workcloud - its purpose-built suite of enterprise software applications, primarily serving in retail, banking and healthcare industries. Zebra also introduced the WS50 powered by Workcloud, the first wearable Android touch computer.

In August 2025, Zebra announced a $1.3 billion all-cash acquisition of Elo Touch Solutions, a touch screen technology maker.
