= Miista =

British fashion brand

- Type: Private
- Industry: Fashion
- Founded: 2010
- Founder: Laura Villasenin
- Headquarters: London, England
- Products: footwear ready-to-wear accessories
- Website: https://www.miista.com

Miista is a fashion brand that makes footwear, accessories, and ready-to-wear, manufactured in Europe. The company was founded in the United Kingdom in 2010 as Miista Limited.

== History ==
Miista was founded in 2010 by Spanish designer Laura Villasenin, who had moved to the United Kingdom to study fashion design and shoemaking. For the first ten years, the brand concentrated on shoes and accessories, establishing manufacturing partnerships in Spain and Portugal.

In 2021, Miista launched a clothing line and began producing garments in-house in Spain. This move was part of a broader trend among accessories-led brands seeking to expand into ready-to-wear. By entering the ready-to-wear market, the company shifted apparel production in-house.

Miista presented a ready-to-wear collection during New York Fashion Week for the Spring/Summer 2026 season. The presentation incorporated choreographed performance elements developed in collaboration with choreographer and creative director Zoï Tatopoulos. Tatopoulos, known for her work in music videos and contemporary performance, created choreography that interacted with the brand’s clothing and footwear during the show.

During the same period, the brand became the subject of broader public discussion following appearances of its footwear in high-profile cultural and political contexts. In 2025 and 2026, Miista boots were worn at public events promoting the television series Wednesday and the inauguration of New York City Mayor Zohran Mamdani.

== Operations ==
Miista produces footwear, accessories, and ready-to-wear collections. Its apparel offering includes denim, dresses, knitwear, swimwear, and tops.

Manufacturing is based in Europe, primarily in Spain and Portugal. The company operates a clothing factory in Galicia, Spain, and sources textiles from southern Europe. In 2025, Vogue reported that the company was building its second factory in A Coruña, Galicia, as part of an effort to increase in-house production and maintain closer oversight of labour conditions. Industry publications have described the expansion of in-house production in Galicia as a long-term operational strategy aimed at reinforcing regional manufacturing capacity and responding to supply chain volatility affecting the global fashion industry in the 2020s.

By the mid-2020s, direct-to-consumer sales accounted for the majority of Miista's revenue. The United States is its largest market, generating over 40 percent of total revenue. In response to tariff uncertainty, the company expanded its US warehousing and fulfilment operations.

It sells primarily through its own website and stores, as well as through wholesale distribution. In March 2022, the brand opened a month-long pop-up in Paris, with further activations planned in Barcelona and New York City, alongside a styling event in London.

In addition to its fashion collections, Miista has produced editorial projects. In 2022, the brand released the first issue of a printed publication titled Their Gaze, which accompanied a seasonal retail activation and directed its proceeds to organizations supporting humanitarian aid for Ukraine.
